= 2010–11 UCI America Tour =

- Seventh edition of the UCI America Tour

Details
- Dates: 17 October 2010–17 September 2011
- Location: North America and South America
- Races: 32

Champions
- Individual champion: Miguel Ubeto (VEN)
- Teams' champion: EPM–UNE
- Nations' champion: Colombia

The 2010–11 UCI America Tour was the seventh season for the UCI America Tour. The season began on 17 October 2010 with the Volta de São Paulo and ended on 17 September 2011 with the Univest Grand Prix.

The points leader, based on the cumulative results of previous races, wears the UCI America Tour cycling jersey. Gregorio Ladino of Colombia was the defending champion of the 2009–10 UCI America Tour. Miguel Ubeto of Venezuela was crowned as the 2010–11 UCI America Tour champion.

Throughout the season, points are awarded to the top finishers of stages within stage races and the final general classification standings of each of the stages races and one-day events. The quality and complexity of a race also determines how many points are awarded to the top finishers, the higher the UCI rating of a race, the more points are awarded.

The UCI ratings from highest to lowest are as follows:

- Multi-day events: 2.HC, 2.1 and 2.2
- One-day events: 1.HC, 1.1 and 1.2

== Events ==
=== 2010 ===
Date	Race name	Location	UCI Rating	Winner	Team
17–24 October	Volta de São Paulo	Brazil	2.2	Gregolry Panizo (BRA)	Clube DataRo de Ciclismo
20–31 October	Vuelta a Guatemala	Guatemala	2.2	Giovanny Báez (COL)	EPM–UNE
7–14 November	Vuelta a Bolivia	Bolivia	2.2	Óscar Soliz (BOL)	EBSA
19–22 November	Vuelta a Ecuador	Ecuador	2.2	Byron Guamá (ECU)	Concentración Deportiva de Pichincha
2–5 December	Vuelta a Paraguay	Paraguay	2.2	Luis Alberto Martínez (URU)	Equipo Porongos
17–29 December	Vuelta a Costa Rica	Costa Rica	2.2	Juan Carlos Rojas (CRC)	JPS–Giant

=== 2011 ===
Date	Race name	Location	UCI Rating	Winner	Team
12–23 January	Vuelta al Táchira	Venezuela	2.2	Manuel Medina (VEN)	Gobernación del Zulia
17–23 January	Tour de San Luis	Argentina	2.1	Marco Arriagada (CHI)	Chile (national team)
27 January – 6 February	Vuelta de Chile	Chile	2.2	Marco Arriagada (CHI)	T Banc-Skechers
20–27 February	Vuelta a la Independencia Nacional	Dominican Republic	2.2	Tomás Gil (VEN)	Venezuela (national team)
8–13 March	Rutas de América	Uruguay	2.2	Jorge Soto (URU)	Club Porongos
15–19 March	Giro do Interior de São Paulo	Brazil	2.2	Flavio Reblin (BRA)	Memorial-Prefeitura De Santos-Giant
13–17 April	Volta de Gravatai	Brazil	2.2	Renato Seabra (BRA)	Clube DataRo de Ciclismo-Foz do Iguaçu
15–24 April	Vuelta al Uruguay	Uruguay	2.2	Iván Casas (COL)	Boyacá Orgullo de America
6 May	Pan American Cycling Championships – Time Trial	Colombia	CC	Leandro Messineo (ARG)	Argentina (national team)
8 May	Pan American Cycling Championships – Road Race	Colombia	CC	Gregolry Panizo (BRA)	Brazil (national team)
14 May	Clásico Federación Venezolana de Ciclismo	Venezuela	1.2	Ángel Pulgar (VEN)	Lara-Fúndela
15 May	Copa Federación Venezolana de Ciclismo	Venezuela	1.2	Miguel Ubeto (VEN)	Lotería del Táchira
15–22 May	Tour of California	United States	2.HC	Chris Horner (USA)	Team RadioShack
2–5 June	Coupe des Nations Ville Saguenay	Canada	2.Ncup	Christopher Juul Jensen (DEN)	Denmark (national team)
5 June	TD Bank International Championship	United States	1.HC	Alex Rasmussen (DEN)	HTC–Highroad
11–19 June	Tour de Beauce	Canada	2.2	Francisco Mancebo (ESP)	Realcyclist.com Cycling Team
12–26 June	Vuelta a Colombia	Colombia	2.2	Félix Cárdenas (COL)	GW–Shimano
9 July	Prova Ciclística 9 de Julho	Brazil	1.2	Roberto Pinheiro (BRA)	Funvic–Pindamonhangaba
9–17 July	Tour de Martinique	France	2.2	Guillaume Malle (FRA)	Veranda Rideau Sarthe
13–24 July	Vuelta a Venezuela	Venezuela	2.2	Pedro Gutiérrez (VEN)	Gobernación del Zulia
27–31 July	Tour do Rio	Brazil	2.2	Juan Pablo Suárez (COL)	EPM–UNE
5–7 August	Tour of Elk Grove	United States	2.2	Luis Amarán (CUB)	Jamis–Sutter Home
5–14 August	Tour de Guadeloupe	France	2.2	Boris Carène (FRA)	Gwada Bikers 118
9–14 August	Tour of Utah	United States	2.1	Levi Leipheimer (USA)	Team RadioShack
22–28 August	USA Pro Cycling Challenge	United States	2.1	Levi Leipheimer (USA)	Team RadioShack
17 September	Univest Grand Prix	United States	1.2	Ryan Roth (CAN)	SpiderTech–C10

== Final standings ==
=== Individual classification ===
Rank	Name	Team	Points
1	Miguel Ubeto (VEN)		180
2	Gregolry Panizo (BRA)	Clube Dataro de Ciclismo-Foz do Iguaçu	179
3	Sergio Henao (COL)	Gobernación de Antioquia	151
4	Manuel Medina (VEN)		144
5	Juan Pablo Suárez (COL)	EPM–UNE	135
6	Gonzalo Garrido (CHI)		131
7	Renato Seabra (BRA)	Clube Dataro de Ciclismo-Foz do Iguaçu	123
8	Jorge Soto (URY)		110
9	Juan Carlos Rojas (CRC)		109
10	Marco Arriagada (CHI)		108

=== Team classification ===
Rank	Team	Points
1	EPM–UNE	371
2	Clube Dataro de Ciclismo-Foz do Iguaçu	360
3	Movistar Continental	354
4	Funvic–Pindamonhangaba	309
5	Gobernación de Antioquia	286
6	SpiderTech–C10	213
7	UnitedHealthcare	153
8	Androni Giocattoli	153
9	Jamis–Sutter Home	144
10	Chipotle–Garmin Development Team	121

=== Nation classification ===
Rank	Nation	Points
1	Colombia	1808.2
2	Venezuela	914.2
3	Brazil	696
4	Argentina	598.67
5	Canada	571.25
6	United States	477
7	Uruguay	422
8	Chile	416
9	Cuba	281
10	Costa Rica	248

=== Nation under-23 classification ===
Rank	Nation under-23	Points
1	Venezuela	374
2	United States	358
3	Colombia	172
4	Argentina	120.67
5	Canada	67
6	Netherlands Antilles	66
7	Belize	60
8	Brazil	50
9	Antigua and Barbuda	40
10	El Salvador	36
