= 2009–10 UCI America Tour =

- Sixth edition of the UCI America Tour

Details
- Dates: 4 October 2009–12 September 2010
- Location: North America and South America
- Races: 35

Champions
- Individual champion: Gregorio Ladino (COL) (Boyacá Orgullo de America)
- Teams' champion: Funvic–Pindamonhangaba
- Nations' champion: Colombia

The 2009–10 UCI America Tour was the sixth season for the UCI America Tour. The season began on 4 October 2009 with the Vuelta Chihuahua and ended on 12 September 2010 with the Univest Grand Prix.

The points leader, based on the cumulative results of previous races, wears the UCI America Tour cycling jersey. Gregorio Ladino of Colombia was the defending champion of the 2008–09 UCI America Tour and was crowned as the 2009–10 UCI America Tour champion.

Throughout the season, points are awarded to the top finishers of stages within stage races and the final general classification standings of each of the stages races and one-day events. The quality and complexity of a race also determines how many points are awarded to the top finishers, the higher the UCI rating of a race, the more points are awarded.

The UCI ratings from highest to lowest are as follows:

- Multi-day events: 2.HC, 2.1 and 2.2
- One-day events: 1.HC, 1.1 and 1.2

== Events ==
=== 2009 ===
Date	Race name	Location	UCI Rating	Winner	Team
4–10 October	Vuelta Chihuahua	Mexico	2.1	Óscar Sevilla (ESP)	Rock Racing
17 October	Clasica Cancún	Mexico	1.2	Alberto Contador (ESP)	Astana
20 October–1 November	Vuelta a Guatemala	Guatemala	2.2	Juan Carlos Rojas (CRC)	Café Quetzal
1–8 November	Vuelta a Bolivia	Bolivia	2.2	Gregorio Ladino (COL)	Tecos-Trek
21–29 November	Vuelta a Ecuador	Ecuador	2.2	Fernando Camargo (COL)	Boyacá Orgullo de America
24–29 November	Vuelta Ciclista Chiapas	Mexico	2.2	Libardo Niño (COL)	EBSA-Empresa de Energía de Boyacá
16–28 December	Vuelta a Costa Rica	Costa Rica	2.2	Janier Acevedo (COL)	GreatWall–Indeportes

=== 2010 ===
Date	Race name	Location	UCI Rating	Winner	Team
13–24 January	Vuelta al Táchira	Venezuela	2.2	José Rujano (VEN)	Gobernación del Zulia
18–24 January	Tour de San Luis	Argentina	2.1	Vincenzo Nibali (ITA)	Liquigas–Doimo
9–21 February	Vuelta a Cuba	Cuba	2.2	Arnold Alcolea (CUB)	Cuba (national team)
16–21 February	Rutas de América	Uruguay	2.2	Hernán Cline (URU)	Alas Rojas
22–28 February	Vuelta a la Independencia Nacional	Dominican Republic	2.2	Augusto Sánchez (DOM)	Aro & Pedal
14–18 March	Giro do Interior de São Paulo	Brazil	2.2	Renato Seabra (BRA)	Clube Dataro de Ciclismo
26 March–4 April	Vuelta al Uruguay	Uruguay	2.2	Richard Mascarañas (URU)	Alas Rojas Santa Lucia
14–18 April	Volta de Gravatai	Brazil	2.2	Jaime Castañeda (COL)	EPM–UNE
18 April	Tour of the Battenkill	United States	1.2	Caleb Fairly (USA)	Holowesko Partners U23
18–25 April	Vuelta Mexico	Mexico	2.2	Óscar Sevilla (ESP)	Rock Racing
21–25 April	Tour de Santa Catarina	Brazil	2.2	Edwar Ortiz (COL)	EPM–UNE
8 May	Pan American Cycling Championships – Time Trial	Mexico	CC	Iván Casas (COL)	Colombia (national team)
9 May	Pan American Cycling Championships – Road Race	Mexico	CC	Carlos Oyarzun (CHI)	Chile (national team)
12–16 May	Doble Sucre Potosí GP Cemento Fancesa	Bolivia	2.2	Óscar Soliz (BOL)	EBSA
16–23 May	Tour of California	United States	2.HC	Michael Rogers (AUS)	Team HTC–Columbia
2–6 June	Volta do Paraná	Brazil	2.2	Marco Arriagada (CHI)	Funvic-Pindamonhangaba
3–6 June	Coupe des nations Ville Saguenay	Canada	2.Ncup	Luka Mezgec (SLO)	Slovenia (national team)
6 June	San Antonio de Padua Classic	Puerto Rico	1.2	Alexander González (COL)	Triple-S
6 June	Philadelphia International Championship	United States	1.HC	Matthew Goss (AUS)	Team HTC–Columbia
12 June	Chrono de Gatineau	Canada	1.2	Ben Day (AUS)	Fly V Australia
15–20 June	Tour de Beauce	Canada	2.2	Ben Day (AUS)	Fly V Australia
30 June–11 July	Vuelta a Venezuela	Venezuela	2.2	Tomás Gil (VEN)	Lotería del Táchira
9 July	Prova Ciclística 9 de Julho	Brazil	1.2	Francisco Chamorro (ARG)	Scott–Marcondes Cesar–São José dos Campos
10–18 July	Tour de Martinique	France	2.2	Miyataka Shimizu (JPN)	Bridgestone–Anchor
28 July–1 August	Tour do Rio	Brazil	2.2	Tomas Alberio (ITA)	U.C. Trevigiani–Dynamon–Bottoli
1–15 August	Vuelta a Colombia	Colombia	2.2	Sergio Henao (COL)	Indeportes Antioquia
6–15 August	Tour de Guadeloupe	France	2.2	Francisco Mancebo (ESP)	Heraklion Kastro-Murcia
11–12 September	Univest Grand Prix	United States	1.2	Jonas Ahlstrand (SWE)	Team Cykelcity

== Final standings ==
=== Individual classification ===
Rank	Name	Points
1	Gregorio Ladino (COL)	239
2	Óscar Sevilla (ESP)	186
3	Arnold Alcolea (CUB)	176
4	José Alarcón (VEN)	160
5	Óscar Soliz (BOL)	138
6	Libardo Niño (COL)	136
7	Richard Mascarañas (URY)	136
8	Francisco Mancebo (ESP)	132
9	José Alirio Contreras (VEN)	119
10	Carlos Oyarzún (CHI)	116

=== Team classification ===
Rank	Team	Points
1	Funvic–Pindamonhangaba	347
2	SpiderTech–Planet Energy	316
3	EPM–UNE	268
4	Androni Giocattoli	212
5	Heraklion Kastro-Murcia	198
6	Fly V Australia	190
7	Burgos 2016-Castilla y León	145.66
8	Team Type 1	134
9	Scott–Marcondes Cesar	131
10	UnitedHealthcare–Maxxis	121

=== Nation classification ===
Rank	Nation	Points
1	Colombia	1455.06
2	Venezuela	1068.6
3	United States	846.5
4	Canada	681
5	Brazil	487
6	Argentina	434
7	Costa Rica	415.3
8	Uruguay	369
9	Cuba	307
10	Chile	264

=== Nation under-23 classification ===
Rank	Nation under-23	Points
1	Venezuela	416
2	United States	352.66
3	Colombia	345
4	Costa Rica	166.64
5	Canada	159
6	Netherlands Antilles	118
7	Brazil	76
8	Argentina	75
9	Belize	56
10	Uruguay	52
