= 2010 Vuelta a Colombia =

2009–10 UCI America Tour

Race details
- Dates: August 1–15, 2010
- Stages: 14
- Distance: 2,057.2 km (1,278 mi)
- Winning time: 53h 48' 21"

Results
Jersey awarded to the overall winner	Winner	Sergio Luis Henao (COL)	(Indeportes Antioquia-IDEA-FLA-Lotería de Medellín)
	Second	Óscar Sevilla (ESP)	(Indeportes Antioquia-IDEA-FLA-Lotería de Medellín)
	Third	José Rujano (VEN)	(Lotería de Boyacá)
	Points	Sergio Luis Henao (COL)	(Indeportes Antioquia-IDEA-FLA-Lotería de Medellín)
	Mountains	José Rujano (VEN)	(Lotería de Boyacá)
	Sprints	Juan Alejandro García (COL)	(GW Shimano-CHEC-Edec-Envia)
	Team	Indeportes Antioquia-IDEA-FLA-Lotería de Medellín	

The 60th edition of the Vuelta a Colombia was held from August 1 to August 15, 2010.

== Stages ==
=== 2010-08-01: La Ceja — Rionegro (20 km) ===
Place	Stage 1 (Team Time Trial)		General Classification	
Place	Name	Time	Name	Time
1.	Indeportes Antioquia-IDEA-FLA-Lotería de Medellín	00:23.24	Sergio Luis Henao (COL)	00:23.24
2.	Colombia es Pasión-472-Café de Colombia	+0.29	Julian Atehortua (COL)	—
3.	GW Shimano-CHEC-Edec-Envia	+0.36	Juan Carlos Lopez (COL)	—

=== 2010-08-02: Rionegro — Puerto Boyacá (164 km) ===
Place	Stage 2		General Classification	
Place	Name	Time	Name	Time
1.	Jaime Castañeda (COL)	03:59.55	Óscar Sevilla (ESP)	04:23.11
2.	Óscar Sevilla (ESP)	—	Sergio Luis Henao (COL)	+0.08
3.	Marlon Perez (COL)	—	Janier Acevedo (COL)	+0.08

=== 2010-08-03: Puerto Boyacá — Barrancabermeja (191 km) ===
Place	Stage 3		General Classification	
Place	Name	Time	Name	Time
1.	Jairo Pérez (COL)	04:42.47	Jairo Pérez (COL)	09:06.44
2.	Wilson Zambrano (COL)	+0.11	Dalivier Ospina (COL)	+0.22
3.	Dalivier Ospina (COL)	+0.14	Óscar Sevilla (ESP)	+1.23

=== 2010-08-04: Barrancabermeja — Bucaramanga (117 km) ===
Place	Stage 4		General Classification	
Place	Name	Time	Name	Time
1.	Sergio Luis Henao (COL)	02:59.15	Óscar Sevilla (ESP)	12:07.16
2.	Óscar Sevilla (ESP)	—	Dalivier Ospina (COL)	—
3.	Félix Cárdenas (COL)	+0.33	Sergio Luis Henao (COL)	+0.04

=== 2010-08-05: Bucaramanga — San Gil-Socorro (117 km) ===
Place	Stage 5		General Classification	
Place	Name	Time	Name	Time
1.	Fabio Duarte (COL)	03:02.08	Óscar Sevilla (ESP)	15:09.18
2.	Óscar Sevilla (ESP)	—	Dalivier Ospina (COL)	+0.08
3.	Félix Cárdenas (COL)	+0.01	Sergio Luis Henao (COL)	+0.11

=== 2010-08-06: Socorro — Tunja (165.2 km) ===
Place	Stage 6		General Classification	
Place	Name	Time	Name	Time
1.	Luis Felipe Laverde (COL)	04:31.36	Óscar Sevilla (ESP)	19:41.02
2.	José Alarcón (VEN)	+0.05	Sergio Luis Henao (COL)	+0.11
3.	Fabio Duarte (COL)	+0.08	Dalivier Ospina (COL)	+0.35

=== 2010-08-07: Boyacá Tunja — Duitama (147 km) ===
Place	Stage 7		General Classification	
Place	Name	Time	Name	Time
1.	Freddy Gonzalez (COL)	03:22.44	Óscar Sevilla (ESP)	23:05.45
2.	Fernando Camargo (COL)	+0.03	Sergio Luis Henao (COL)	+0.11
3.	Samuel Cabrera (COL)	+0.06	Dalivier Ospina (COL)	+0.35

=== 2010-08-08: Duitama-Briceño — La Calera-Bogotá (147 km) ===
Place	Stage 8		General Classification	
Place	Name	Time	Name	Time
1.	Diego Calderón (COL)	05:08.45	Óscar Sevilla (ESP)	28:19.28
2.	Freddy Piamonte (COL)	+1.43	Sergio Luis Henao (COL)	+0.11
3.	Gregorio Ladino (COL)	+3.34	Dalivier Ospina (COL)	+0.35

=== 2010-08-09: Bogotá La Vega — Libano (229 km) ===
Place	Stage 9		General Classification	
Place	Name	Time	Name	Time
1.	José Rujano (VEN)	05:54.57	Sergio Luis Henao (COL)	34:14.38
2.	Sergio Luis Henao (COL)	+1.28	Óscar Sevilla (ESP)	+0.43
3.	Fabio Duarte (COL)	+1.56	Darwin Atapuma (COL)	+3.02

=== 2010-08-10: Armero — La Tebaida (203 km) ===
Place	Stage 10		General Classification	
Place	Name	Time	Name	Time
1.	Sergio Luis Henao (COL)	05:33.03	Sergio Luis Henao (COL)	39:48.31
2.	Juan Pablo Suarez (COL)	—	Francisco Colorado (COL)	+3.29
3.	José Rujano (VEN)	—	Óscar Sevilla (ESP)	+3.31

=== 2010-08-12: Yumbo — Pereira (204 km) ===
Place	Stage 11		General Classification	
Place	Name	Time	Name	Time
1.	Jaime Vergara (COL)	04:36.00	Sergio Luis Henao (COL)	44.24.54
2.	Juan Pablo Villegas (COL)	—	Francisco Colorado (COL)	+3.29
3.	Carlos Betancur (COL)	+0.01	Óscar Sevilla (ESP)	+3.31

=== 2010-08-13: Pereira — Manizales (117 km) ===
Place	Stage 12		General Classification	
Place	Name	Time	Name	Time
1.	Fabio Duarte (COL)	03:00.13	Sergio Luis Henao (COL)	47.25.44
2.	Óscar Sevilla (ESP)	+0.02	Óscar Sevilla (ESP)	+2.30
3.	José Rujano (VEN)	+0.04	José Rujano (VEN)	+2.50

=== 2010-08-14: Manizales — Alto de Palmas (206 km) ===
Place	Stage 13		General Classification	
Place	Name	Time	Name	Time
1.	Javier Gonzalez (COL)	05:39.14	Sergio Luis Henao (COL)	53:05.02
2.	Darwin Atapuma (COL)	+0.05	Óscar Sevilla (ESP)	+3.12
3.	Sergio Luis Henao (COL)	+0.08	José Rujano (VEN)	+3.21

=== 2010-08-15: Medellín — Medellín (34 km) ===
Place	Stage 14 (Individual Time Trial)		General Classification	
Place	Name	Time	Name	Time
1.	Óscar Sevilla (ESP)	00:41.56	Sergio Luis Henao (COL)	53:48.49
2.	Marlon Perez (COL)	+1.03	Óscar Sevilla (ESP)	+1.49
3.	José Rujano (VEN)	+1.04	José Rujano (VEN)	+3.02

== Jersey progression ==
Stage	Winner	General classification	Points classification	Mountains classification	Sprints classification	Team classification
1	Indeportes Antioquia-IDEA-FLA-Lotería de Medellín	Sergio Henao	no award	no award	no award	Indeportes Antioquia-IDEA-FLA-Lotería de Medellín
2	Jaime Castañeda	Óscar Sevilla	Jaime Castañeda	Jaime Vergara	Camilo Gómez	Indeportes Antioquia-IDEA-FLA-Lotería de Medellín
3	Jairo Pérez	Jairo Pérez	Jaime Castañeda	Jaime Vergara	Julián López	Indeportes Antioquia-IDEA-FLA-Lotería de Medellín
4	Sergio Henao	Óscar Sevilla	Óscar Sevilla	Jaime Vergara	Julián López	Indeportes Antioquia-IDEA-FLA-Lotería de Medellín
5	Fabio Duarte	Óscar Sevilla	Óscar Sevilla	Jaime Vergara	Julián López	Indeportes Antioquia-IDEA-FLA-Lotería de Medellín
6	Luis Felipe Laverde	Óscar Sevilla	Óscar Sevilla	Jaime Vergara	Jaime Suaza	Indeportes Antioquia-IDEA-FLA-Lotería de Medellín
7	Freddy González	Óscar Sevilla	Óscar Sevilla	Jaime Vergara	Camilo Gómez	Colombia es Pasión-472-Café de Colombia
8	Diego Calderón	Óscar Sevilla	Óscar Sevilla	Óscar Soliz	Juan Alejandro García	Indeportes Antioquia-IDEA-FLA-Lotería de Medellín
9	José Rujano	Sergio Henao	Sergio Henao	Óscar Soliz	Juan Alejandro García	Indeportes Antioquia-IDEA-FLA-Lotería de Medellín
10	Sergio Henao	Sergio Henao	Sergio Henao	Óscar Soliz	Juan Alejandro García	EPM–UNE
11	Jaime Vergara	Sergio Henao	Sergio Henao	Óscar Soliz	Juan Alejandro García	EPM–UNE
12	Fabio Duarte	Sergio Henao	Sergio Henao	Óscar Soliz	Juan Alejandro García	Colombia es Pasión-472-Café de Colombia
13	Javier González	Sergio Henao	Sergio Henao	José Rujano	Juan Alejandro García	EPM–UNE
14	Óscar Sevilla	Sergio Henao	Sergio Henao	José Rujano	Juan Alejandro García	Indeportes Antioquia-IDEA-FLA-Lotería de Medellín

== Final classification ==
RANK	NAME	TEAM	TIME
1.	Sergio Luis Henao (COL)	Indeportes Antioquia-IDEA-FLA-Lotería de Medellín	53:48.21
2.	Óscar Sevilla (ESP)	Indeportes Antioquia-IDEA-FLA-Lotería de Medellín	+ 1.49
3.	José Rujano (VEN)	Lotería de Boyacá	+ 3.02
4.	Francisco Colorado (COL)	EPM–UNE	+ 4.52
5.	Juan Pablo Suárez (COL)	EPM–UNE	+ 5.17
6.	Darwin Atapuma (COL)	Colombia es Pasión-472-Café de Colombia	+ 6.12
7.	Freddy Montaña (COL)	Boyacá Orgullo de America	+ 7.45
8.	Alex Cano (COL)	Colombia es Pasión-472-Café de Colombia	+ 10.39
9.	Javier González (COL)	EPM–UNE	+ 12.18
10.	Diego Calderón (COL)	Néctar de Cundinamarca-Pinturas Bler	+ 14.51
11.	Iván Parra (COL)	GW Shimano-CHEC-Edec-Envia	+ 15.01
12.	Jair Perez (COL)	Empresa de Energia de Boyacá Ebsa	+ 20.55
13.	Dalivier Ospina (COL)	Colombia es Pasión-472-Café de Colombia	+ 26.56
14.	Janier Acevedo (COL)	Indeportes Antioquia-IDEA-FLA-Lotería de Medellín	+ 33.50
15.	Rodolfo Torres (COL)	Boyacá Orgullo de America	+ 37.07

== Teams ==
Lotería de Boyacá

1. (Venezuela) José Rujano
2. (Colombia) Daniel Rincon
3. (Venezuela) Manuel Medina
4. (Colombia) Mauricio Neisa
5. (Venezuela) José Alarcón
6. (Colombia) Graciano Fonseca
7. (Venezuela) Jhonathan Camargo
8. (Colombia) Aldo Valero
9. (Venezuela) Noel Vasquez
10. (Colombia) Edgar Fonseca
- Director Deportivo: Hernan Aleman

EPM–UNE

11. (Colombia) Mauricio Ortega
12. (Colombia) Giovanny Báez
13. (Colombia) Javier Gonzalez
14. (Colombia) Rafael Infantino
15. (Colombia) Stiber Ortiz
16. (Colombia) Fredy Piamonte
17. (Colombia) Juan Pablo Suarez
18. (Colombia) Francisco Colorado
19. (Colombia) Jaime Castañeda
20. (Colombia) Jorge Martinez
- Director Deportivo: Raul Mesa Orozco

Néctar de Cundinamarca-Pinturas Bler

21. (Colombia) José Castelblanco
22. (Colombia) Fredy González
23. (Colombia) Fabio Montenegro
24. (Colombia) Víctor Hugo González
25. (Colombia) Diego Quintero
26. (Colombia) Wilson Marentes
27. (Colombia) Diego Calderón
28. (Colombia) Álvaro Gómez
29. (Colombia) Alexander Roa
30. (Colombia) Giovanni Balsero
- Director Deportivo: Raul Gomez

Indeportes Antioquia-IDEA-FLA-Lotería de Medellín

31. (Spain) Óscar Sevilla
32. (Colombia) Sergio Luis Henao
33. (Colombia) Juan Carlos Lopez
34. (Colombia) Janier Acevedo
35. (Colombia) Julian Atehortua
36. (Colombia) Rafael Montiel
37. (Colombia) Julián Rodas
38. (Colombia) John Freddy Parra
39. (Colombia) Alejandro Ramírez
40. (Colombia) Carlos Betancur
- Director Deportivo: Rafael Antonio Niño

Boyacá Orgullo de America

41. (Colombia) Freddy Montaña
42. (Colombia) Fernando Camargo
43. (Colombia) Gregorio Ladino
44. (Colombia) Israel Ochoa
45. (Colombia) Edwin Parra
46. (Colombia) Mauricio Casas
47. (Colombia) Rodolfo Torres
48. (Colombia) Uberlino Mesa
49. (Colombia) Michael Rodríguez
50. (Colombia) Emiro Matta
- Director Deportivo: Angel Yesid Camargo

GW Shimano-CHEC-Edec-Envia

51. (Colombia) Félix Cárdenas
52. (Colombia) Iván Parra
53. (Colombia) Marlon Pérez
54. (Colombia) Juan Pablo Villegas
55. (Colombia) Camilo Gómez
56. (Colombia) Jaime Vergara
57. (Colombia) Juan Alejandro Garcia
58. (Colombia) Geovanny Chacon
59. (Colombia) Edwin Orozco
60. (Colombia) Jaime Suaza
- Director Deportivo: Luis Alfonso Cely

Colombia es Pasión-472-Café de Colombia

61. (Colombia) Fabio Duarte
62. (Colombia) Luis Felipe Laverde
63. (Colombia) Alex Caño
64. (Colombia) Darwin Atapuma
65. (Colombia) Juan Pablo Forero
66. (Colombia) Víctor Hugo Peña
67. (Colombia) John Martinez
68. (Colombia) Robinson Chalapud
69. (Colombia) Dalivier Ospina
70. (Colombia) William Munoz
- Director Deportivo: Fernando Saldarriaga

Empresa de Energia de Boyacá EBSA

71. (Colombia) Libardo Niño
72. (Bolivia) Óscar Soliz
73. (Colombia) Victor Niño
74. (Colombia) Wilson Cepeda
75. (Colombia) Jairo Pérez
76. (Colombia) Santiago Ojeda
77. (Colombia) Miguel Niño
78. (Colombia) Jair Perez
79. (Colombia) Alexis Camacho (SUB)
- Director Deportivo: Carlos Mario Jamallo

Super Giros

81. (Colombia) Juan Diego Ramirez
82. (Colombia) Hebert Gutierrez
83. (Colombia) Alexander González
84. (Colombia) Carlos Alzate
85. (Colombia) Alvaro Montoya
86. (Colombia) Nestor Bernal
87. (Colombia) Argiro Zapata
88. (Colombia) Edwin Sanchez
89. (Colombia) Armando Cardenas
- Director Deportivo: William Palacio

Fuerzas Armadas-Ejercito Nacional

91. (Colombia) Willinton Bustamante
92. (Colombia) Leonardo Rodriguez
93. (Colombia) Wilson Lopez
94. (Colombia) Deivis Rubio
95. (Colombia) Gustavo Ramirez
96. (Colombia) Jorge Gómez
97. (Colombia) Jorge Agudelo
98. (Colombia) Richard Velandia
- Director Deportivo: Raúl Gómez

IMRD Cota-Flejes Bonelo

101. (Colombia) Samuel Cabrera
102. (Colombia) Daniel Balsero
103. (Colombia) Gerardo Rodriguez
104. (Colombia) Jose David Romero
105. (Colombia) Andres Pantano
106. (Colombia) Edwin Lancheros
107. (Colombia) Felipe Galvis
108. (Colombia) Yerson Sanchez
109. (Colombia) Ricardo Alfonso
110. (Colombia) Fabio Paez
- Director Deportivo: Jose Bonelo

Formesan-Panachi-Inder Santander

111. (Colombia) Hernán Buenahora
112. (Colombia) Alejandro Serna
113. (Colombia) Elder Herrera
114. (Colombia) Jorge Duarte
115. (Colombia) Olmedo Capacho
116. (Colombia) Wilson Zambrano
117. (Colombia) Lorenzo Arguello
118. (Colombia) Alexander Rojas
119. (Colombia) Remberto Jaramillo
120. (Colombia) Jhonatan Jiminez
- Director Deportivo: Federico Muñoz

== See also ==
- Clásico RCN
