= Róbigzon Oyola =

Colombian cyclist (born 1988)

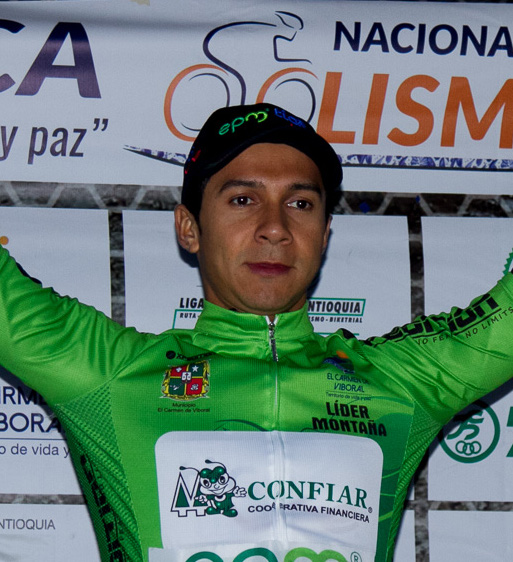
- Oyola in 2016

Personal information
- Full name: Róbigzon Leandro Oyola Oyola
- Born: 10 August 1988 (age 38) Villahermosa, Tolima Department, Colombia

Cycling career
- Sport: Cycling
- Current team: Team Medellín–EPM
- Discipline: Road
- Role: Rider

Amateur teams
- 2009: UNE–EPM
- 2014: EPM–UNE–Área Metropolitana

Professional teams
- 2010–2013: EPM–UNE
- 2015–2016: EPM–UNE–Área Metropolitana
- 2017–: Medellín–Inder

Róbigzon Leandro Oyola Oyola (born 10 August 1988) is a Colombian cyclist, who currently rides for UCI Continental team Team Medellín–EPM.

== Major results ==
2011
6th Overall Tour do Rio
2012
2nd Overall Vuelta a la Independencia Nacional
7th Overall Tour do Rio
2013
5th Time trial, National Road Championships
2014
1st Stage 8 Vuelta a Guatemala
1st Stage 1 (TTT) Vuelta a Colombia
5th Road race, National Road Championships
2015
1st Overall Vuelta a la Independencia Nacional
1st Stage 1 (TTT) Vuelta a Colombia
4th Time trial, National Road Championships
2016
1st Team time trial, National Road Championships
2017
7th Overall Tour of Ankara
2018
6th Gran Premio Comité Olímpico Nacional
7th Gran Premio FECOCI
7th Overall Vuelta Internacional Ciclista Michoacan
2019
6th Overall Vuelta del Uruguay
6th Overall Tour of Qinghai Lake

1st Stage 1 (TTT)

2020
Clásico RCN

1st Stages 1 (TTT) & 4

2022
4th Overall Vuelta a Formosa Internacional
10th Maryland Cycling Classic
2023
10th Overall Vuelta Bantrab

1st Stage 2
