= 2008–09 UCI America Tour =

- Fifth edition of the UCI America Tour

Details
- Dates: 5 October 2008–12 September 2009
- Location: North America and South America
- Races: 35

Champions
- Individual champion: Gregorio Ladino (COL) (Tecos Trek UAG)
- Teams' champion: Diquigiovanni–Androni
- Nations' champion: Colombia

The 2008–09 UCI America Tour was the fifth season for the UCI America Tour. The season began on 5 October 2008 with the Vuelta Chihuahua Internacional and ended on 12 September 2009 with the Univest Grand Prix.

The points leader, based on the cumulative results of previous races, wears the UCI America Tour cycling jersey. Manuel Medina of Venezuela was the defending champion of the 2007–08 UCI America Tour. Gregorio Ladino of Colombia was crowned as the 2008–09 UCI America Tour champion.

Throughout the season, points are awarded to the top finishers of stages within stage races and the final general classification standings of each of the stages races and one-day events. The quality and complexity of a race also determines how many points are awarded to the top finishers, the higher the UCI rating of a race, the more points are awarded.

The UCI ratings from highest to lowest are as follows:

- Multi-day events: 2.HC, 2.1 and 2.2
- One-day events: 1.HC, 1.1 and 1.2

== Events ==
=== 2008 ===
Date	Race name	Location	UCI Rating	Winner	Team
5–12 October	Vuelta Chihuahua Internacional	Mexico	2.2	Francisco Mancebo (ESP)	Fercase–Rota dos Moveis
5–15 October	Clasico Ciclistico Banfoandes	Venezuela	2.2	José Serpa (COL)	Diquigiovanni–Androni
20 October–1 November	Vuelta a Guatemala	Guatemala	2.2	Manuel Medina (VEN)	Café Quetzal Sello Verde
2–9 November	Vuelta a Bolivia	Bolivia	2.2	Fernando Camargo (COL)	Boyacá Colombia
22–30 November	Vuelta a Ecuador	Ecuador	2.2	Byron Guamá (ECU)	EMAAP
25–30 November	Vuelta Ciclista Chiapas	Mexico	2.2	Gregorio Ladino (COL)	Tecos de la Universidad
14–28 December	Vuelta a Costa Rica	Costa Rica	2.2	Gregory Brenes (CRC)	BCR–Pizza Hut

=== 2009 ===
Date	Race name	Location	UCI Rating	Winner	Team
6–17 January	Vuelta al Táchira	Venezuela	2.2	Rónald González (VEN)	Lotería del Táchira
16–17 January	Giro del Sol San Juan	Argentina	2.2	Emanuel Saldaño (ARG)	Forjar Salud–UOM
19–25 January	Tour de San Luis	Argentina	2.1	Alfredo Lucero (ARG)	Argentina (national team)
10–22 February	Vuelta a Cuba	Cuba	2.2	Arnold Alcolea (CUB)	Cuba (national team)
15–22 February	Tour of California	United States	2.HC	Levi Leipheimer (USA)	Astana
22 February–1 March	Vuelta a la Independencia Nacional	Dominican Republic	2.2	Luis Fernando Sepúlveda (CHI)	Aro & Pedal–Inteja
24 February–1 March	Rutas de América	Uruguay	2.2	Hernán Cline (URU)	C.C. Alas Rojas
1–8 March	Vuelta Mexico	Mexico	2.2	Jackson Rodríguez (VEN)	Diquigiovanni–Androni
26–29 March	Volta de Gravatai	Brazil	2.2	Ramiro Cabrera (URU)	Avai de Florianópolis
2–11 April	Vuelta del Uruguay	Uruguay	2.2	Scott Zwizanski (USA)	Kelly Benefit Strategies
22–26 April	Tour de Santa Catarina	Brazil	2.2	Alex Correia Diniz (BRA)	Sejelp–Fapi–Sundown–JKS
13–17 May	Doble Sucre Potosí GP Cemento Fancesa	Bolivia	2.2	Ferney Bello (COL)	Orbea America Pro Cycling
31 May	U.S. Air Force Cycling Classic	United States	1.2	Shawn Milne (USA)	Team Type 1
3–7 June	Volta Ciclística Internacional do Paraná	Brazil	2.2	Raul Cançado (BRA)	Cesc–Sundown–N Caixa–Calypso
4–7 June	Coupe des nations Ville Saguenay	Canada	2.Ncup	Johan Le Bon (FRA)	France (national team)
7 June	Philadelphia International Championship	United States	1.HC	André Greipel (GER)	Team Columbia–High Road
7–21 June	Vuelta a Colombia	Colombia	2.2	José Rujano (VEN)	Gobernación del Zulia
16–21 June	Tour de Beauce	Canada	2.2	Scott Zwizanski (USA)	Kelly Benefit Strategies
24 June–13 July	Vuelta a Venezuela	Venezuela	2.2	José Rujano (VEN)	Gobernación del Zulia
4–13 July	Tour de Martinique	France	2.2	Thimotee Lefrançois (FRA)	Team UC Nantes Atlantique
9 July	Prova Ciclística 9 de Julho	Brazil	1.2	Bruno Tabanez (BRA)	São Lucas Saúde–UAC
23 July	Pan American Cycling Championships – Time Trial	Mexico	CC	Juan Carlos Lopez (COL)	Colombia (national team)
24 July	Pan American Cycling Championships – Road Race	Mexico	CC	Gregorio Ladino (COL)	Colombia (national team)
7–9 August	Volta de Campos	Brazil	2.2	Breno França Sidoti (BRA)	Scott–Marcondes Cesar–Fadenp–SJC
7–16 August	Tour de Guadeloupe	France	2.2	Nicolas Dumont (FRA)	Only USL
23–30 August	Volta de São Paulo	Brazil	2.2	Sérgio Ribeiro (POR)	Barbot–Siper
7–13 September	Tour of Missouri	United States	2.HC	David Zabriskie (USA)	Garmin–Slipstream
11–12 September	Univest Grand Prix	United States	2.2	Volodymyr Starchyk (UKR)	Amore & Vita–McDonald's

== Final standings ==
=== Individual classification ===
Rank	Name	Points
1	Gregorio Ladino (COL)	238
2	José Rujano (VEN)	198
3	Arnold Alcolea (CUB)	186
4	Luis Fernando Sepúlveda (CHI)	161
5	José Serpa (COL)	148
6	Scott Zwizanski (USA)	136
7	Manuel Medina (VEN)	132
8	Thor Hushovd (NOR)	127
9	Gregory Brenes (CRC)	123
10	Alfredo Lucero (ARG)	118

=== Team classification ===
Rank	Team	Points
1	Diquigiovanni–Androni	440
2	Tecos Trek UAG	365
3	Kelly Benefit Strategies	228
4	Planet Energy	225
5	Rock Racing	209
6	Cervélo TestTeam	153
7	Barbot–Siper	144
8	Colombia es Pasion	142
9	Colavita–Sutter Home	140
10	Amore & Vita–McDonald's	125.3

=== Nation classification ===
Rank	Nation	Points
1	Colombia	1466.3
2	Venezuela	989.69
3	United States	779.2
4	Argentina	580
5	Brazil	555
6	Canada	484
7	Cuba	403
8	Uruguay	374
9	Mexico	269
10	Costa Rica	263.6

=== Nation under-23 classification ===
Rank	Nation under-23	Points
1	Colombia	522
2	United States	421.18
3	Venezuela	145
4	Costa Rica	128.8
5	Canada	124
6	Uruguay	96
7	Brazil	83
8	Cuba	64
9	Ecuador	57
10	Mexico	43
