= Edwar Ortiz =

Colombian bicycle racer

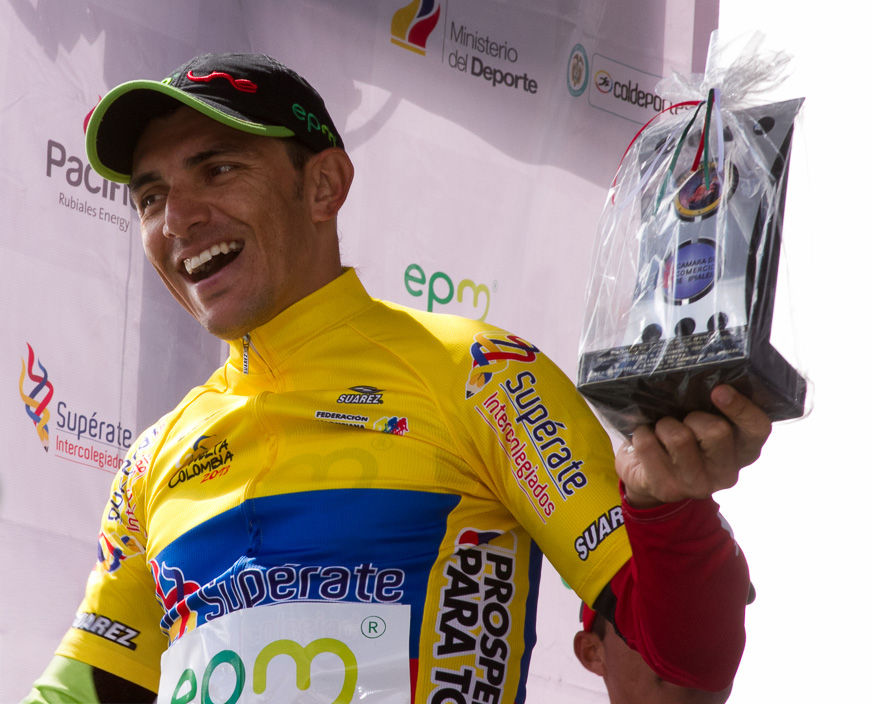
- Ortiz in 2013

Personal information
- Full name: Edwar Stíber Ortiz Caro
- Born: 12 August 1980 (age 46)

Cycling career
- Sport: Cycling
- Discipline: Road
- Role: Rider
- Rider type: Sprinter

Amateur teams
- 2007–2009: GW–Shimano
- 2014: EPM–UNE–Área Metropolitana
- 2017: Movistar Team América
- 2018: Orgullo Paisa

Professional teams
- 2010–2011: EPM–UNE
- 2012: Coldeportes–Comcel
- 2013: EPM–UNE
- 2015: EPM–UNE–Área Metropolitana
- 2016: Movistar Team América
- 2019–2020: Orgullo Paisa

Edwar Stíber Ortiz Caro (born 12 August 1980) is a Colombian cyclist, who most recently rode for UCI Continental team Equipe Continental Orgullo Paisa.

== Major results ==
2009
1st Overall Vuelta a Chiriquí
1st Stage 1 (TTT) Vuelta a Colombia
1st Stage 3 Vuelta a Bolivia
2010
1st Overall Tour de Santa Catarina

1st Stage 2

Vuelta a Chiriquí

1st Stages 8 & 10

3rd Road race, National Road Championships
9th Overall Volta Ciclística Internacional de Gravataí
2011
Vuelta a Chiriquí

1st Stages 2 & 6

2012
3rd Overall Vuelta Mexico Telmex
7th Overall Vuelta a Bolivia

1st Stages 3 (TTT), 6 & 10

2013
1st Stage 1 Vuelta a Colombia
3rd Overall Tour do Rio
2014
1st Stage 1 (TTT) Vuelta a Colombia
1st Stage 7 Vuelta a Chiriquí
2015
1st Stage 1 (TTT) Vuelta a Colombia
1st Stage 7 Clásico RCN
1st Stage 1 (TTT) Vuelta a Chiriquí
2nd Overall Vuelta a la Independencia Nacional
