= 2016 Vuelta a Colombia =

2016 UCI America Tour
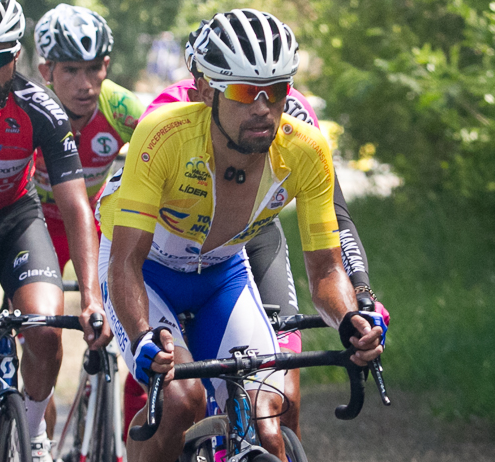
- Mauricio Ortega, the eventual winner, during Stage 8 of the 2016 Vuelta a Colombia

Race details
- Dates: 13–26 June 2016
- Stages: 13
- Winning time: 41h 44' 00"

Results
	Winner	Mauricio Ortega (COL)
	Second	Óscar Sevilla (ESP)
	Third	Alex Cano (COL)
	Points	Óscar Sevilla (ESP)
	Mountains	Mauricio Ortega (COL)
	Youth	Aldemar Reyes (COL)
	Sprints	Steven Cuesta (COL)
	Team	Coldeportes–Claro

The 2016 Vuelta a Colombia was the 66th edition of the Vuelta a Colombia cycle race, held from 13 to 26 June 2016. The race started in Cartagena and finished in Bogotá. The race was won by Mauricio Ortega.

== Route ==
Stage characteristics and winners
Stage	Date	Course	Distance	Type	Stage winner
1	June 13	Cartagena	10.5 km (6.5 mi)	Individual time trial	Óscar Sevilla (ESP)
2	June 14	Cartagena to Montes de Maria	128.6 km (79.9 mi)	Medium mountain stage	Fabio Montenegro (COL)
3	June 15	Sincelejo to Montería	126.8 km (78.8 mi)	Flat stage	Lucas Sebastián Haedo (ARG)
4	June 16	Montería to Caucasia	118.8 km (73.8 mi)	Flat stage	Juan Sebastián Molano (COL)
5	June 17	Yarumal to Bello	113.5 km (70.5 mi)	Flat stage	Lucas Sebastián Haedo (ARG)
6	June 18	Medellín to Alto de Las Palmas	17.5 km (10.9 mi)	Individual time trial	Mauricio Ortega (COL)
7	June 19	Caldas to Manizales	177.9 km (110.5 mi)	Mountain stage	Mauricio Ortega (COL)
	June 20			Rest day	
8	June 21	Manizales to El Tambo	124.9 km (77.6 mi)	Medium mountain stage	Frank Osorio (COL)
9	June 22	Pereira to Cali	214.8 km (133.5 mi)	Flat stage	Jairo Salas (COL)
10	June 23	Buga to Salento	135.5 km (84.2 mi)	Medium mountain stage	Cristhian Montoya (COL)
11	June 24	Salento to Ibagué	138.9 km (86.3 mi)	Medium mountain stage	Alexis Camacho (COL)
12	June 25	Ibagué to Bogotá	212.5 km (132.0 mi)	Flat stage	Juan Pablo Suárez (COL)
13	June 26	Bogotá to Bogotá	95.2 km (59.2 mi)	Mountain stage	Wilson Marentes (COL)

== General classification ==
Final general classification

Rank	Rider	Team	Time
1	Mauricio Ortega (COL)	Supergiros–Redetrans	41h 44' 00"
2	Óscar Sevilla (ESP)	EPM–UNE–Área Metropolitana	+ 2"
3	Alex Cano (COL)	Aguardiente Antioqueño–Lotería de Medellín–Idea Indeportes Antioquia	+ 1' 05"
4	Fabio Duarte (COL)	EPM–UNE–Área Metropolitana	+ 3' 20"
5	Alejandro Ramírez (COL)	Coldeportes–Claro	+ 3' 47"
6	Luis Felipe Laverde (COL)	Coldeportes–Claro	+ 4' 08"
7	Óscar Rivera (COL)	EBSA–Empresa de Energía Boyacá	+ 4' 33"
8	Alexis Camacho (COL)	GW–Shimano	+ 4' 39"
9	Camilo Gómez (COL)	Coldeportes–Claro	+ 6' 40"
10	Aldemar Reyes (COL)	Team Manzana Postobón	+ 11' 54"
