= Jaime Castañeda =

Colombian road bicycle racer

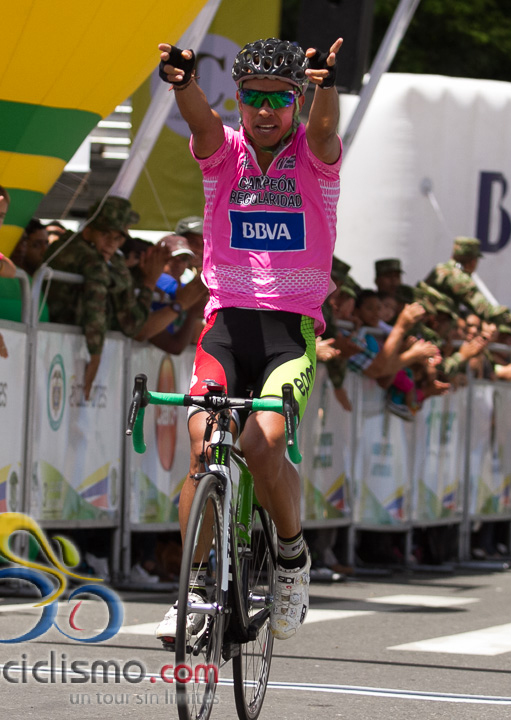

Personal information
- Full name: Jaime Alberto Castañeda Ortega
- Nickname: El Bananero
- Born: 29 October 1986 (age 39) Chigorodo, Colombia
- Height: 1.71 m (5 ft 7 in)
- Weight: 60 kg (130 lb)

Cycling career
- Sport: Cycling
- Discipline: Road
- Role: Rider

Amateur teams
- 2008: UNE
- 2014: EPM–UNE–Área Metropolitana
- 2017: Movistar Team América

Professional teams
- 2006–2007: Lampre–Fondital
- 2010–2011: EPM–UNE
- 2012: Coldeportes–Comcel
- 2013: EPM–UNE
- 2015: EPM–UNE–Área Metropolitana
- 2016: Movistar Team América
- 2018: Orgullo Paisa
- 2019: EPM
Medal record
Men's para-cycling
Representing Colombia
Pan American Track Championships
Gold medal – first place	2022 Maringá	1 km time trial B
Gold medal – first place	2022 Maringá	Individual pursuit B
Gold medal – first place	2022 Maringá	Sprint B
Pan American Road Championships
Gold medal – first place	2022 Maringá	Road race B
Gold medal – first place	2022 Maringá	Time trial B

Jaime Alberto Castañeda Ortega (born 29 October 1986) is a Colombian professional road bicycle racer, who last rode for UCI Continental team EPM. He now rides as a para-cycling sighted guide for tandem events.

== Major results ==
2003
National Junior Track Championships

1st Madison
1st Scratch

7th Road race, Pan American Junior Road Championships
2006
1st Road race, National Under-23 Road Championships
2007
1st Stage 4 Vuelta a los Santanderes
2008
1st Stage 4 Vuelta a Colombia U23
1st Stage 5 Clásica Ciudad de Girardot
2009
1st Stage 3 Clásica Ciudad de Girardot
1st Prologue Clasica Marinilla
1st Stage 2 Clásico RCN
2010
1st Overall Volta Ciclística Internacional do Rio Grande do Sul
1st Stage 2 Vuelta a Colombia
1st Stage 2 Vuelta a Cuba
2011
Vuelta a la Independencia Nacional

1st Stages 7 & 8

2nd Overall Tour do Rio
2013
1st Stage 2 Clásico RCN
3rd Vuelta al Mundo Maya
2014
1st Stage 1 (TTT) Vuelta a Colombia
2015
1st Stage 1 (TTT) Vuelta a Colombia
4th Overall Vuelta a la Independencia Nacional

1st Points classification
1st Stages 2 & 6

2017
1st Stage 9 Clásico RCN
