= Rafael Infantino =

Dominican-born Colombian bicycle racer

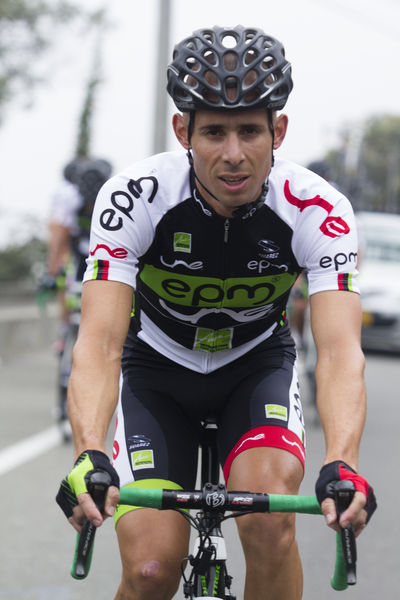
- Infantino in 2014

Personal information
- Full name: Rafael Aníbal Infantino Abreu
- Born: August 28, 1984 (age 42) La Vega Province, Dominican Republic

Cycling career
- Sport: Cycling
- Current team: Retired
- Discipline: Road
- Role: Rider
- Rider type: Time-trialist

Amateur teams
- 2013: Aguardiente Antioqueño–Lotería de Medellín–IDEA
- 2014: EPM–UNE–Área Metropolitana

Professional teams
- 2009: Amica Chips–Knauf
- 2010–2012: EPM–UNE
- 2015: EPM–UNE–Área Metropolitana

Rafael Aníbal Infantino Abreu (born August 28, 1984, in La Vega Province) is a Dominican-born Colombian former professional cyclist.

== Major results ==
2002
5th Time trial, UCI Junior Road World Championships
2004
1st Time trial, Pan American Under-23 Road Championships
2nd Overall Vuelta a Colombia U23
3rd Vuelta a la Independencia Nacional
2007
1st Trofeo Matteotti U23
6th Overall Giro della Valle d'Aosta

1st Stages 4 & 5

8th Overall Giro del Friuli-Venezia Giulia

1st Mountains classification
1st Stage 5

2009
Clásico RCN

1st Stages 1 (TTT) & 7

Bolivarian Games

2nd Time trial
3rd Road race

2010
2nd Time trial, National Road Championships
2011
1st Overall Clásico RCN

1st Stages 7, 8 & 9

1st Stage 6a Vuelta a la Independencia Nacional
6th Overall USA Pro Cycling Challenge
10th Overall Tour do Rio
2012
3rd Overall Clásico RCN
2013
Vuelta a Colombia

1st Stages 3, 8 & 14 (ITT)

2015
Vuelta a Colombia

1st Stages 1 (TTT) & 8 (ITT)

2nd Time trial, National Road Championships
