= 2001 Vuelta a Burgos =

Race details
- Dates: 20–24 August 2001
- Stages: 5
- Distance: 782 km (485.9 mi)
- Winning time: 18h 50' 04"

Results
	Winner	Juan Miguel Mercado (ESP)	(iBanesto.com)
	Second	José Luis Rubiera (ESP)	(U.S. Postal Service)
	Third	Eladio Jiménez (ESP)	(iBanesto.com)

The 2001 Vuelta a Burgos was the 23rd edition of the Vuelta a Burgos road cycling stage race, which was held from 20 August to 24 August 2001. The race started and finished in Burgos. The race was won by Juan Miguel Mercado of the iBanesto.com team.

== General classification ==
Final general classification

Rank	Rider	Team	Time
1	Juan Miguel Mercado (ESP)	iBanesto.com	18h 50' 04"
2	José Luis Rubiera (ESP)	U.S. Postal Service	+ 17"
3	Eladio Jiménez (ESP)	iBanesto.com	+ 18"
4	Óscar Sevilla (ESP)	Kelme–Costa Blanca	+ 25"
5	Fernando Escartín (ESP)	Team Coast–Buffalo	+ 50"
6	Levi Leipheimer (USA)	U.S. Postal Service	+ 57"
7	Rafael Cárdenas (COL)	Kelme–Costa Blanca	+ 1' 07"
8	Félix García Casas (ESP)	Festina	+ 1' 17"
9	Carlos Sastre (ESP)	ONCE–Eroski	+ 1' 22"
10	Gerhard Trampusch (AUT)	Team Telekom	+ 1' 29"
