= Óscar Sevilla =

Spanish cyclist (born 1976)

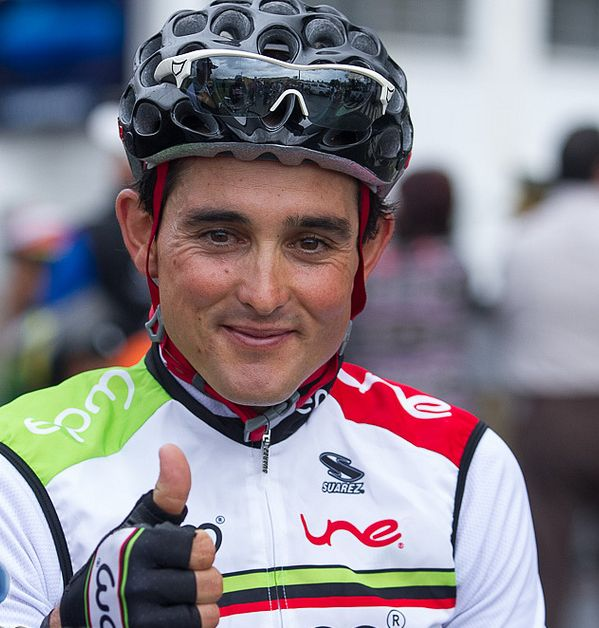
- Sevilla in 2013

Personal information
- Full name: Óscar Miguel Sevilla Rivera
- Nickname: El Niño
- Born: 29 September 1976 (age 50) Ossa de Montiel, Spain
- Height: 1.75 m (5 ft 9 in)
- Weight: 62 kg (137 lb; 9 st 11 lb)

Cycling career
- Sport: Cycling
- Current team: Team Medellín–EPM
- Discipline: Road
- Role: Rider
- Rider type: Climbing specialist

Amateur teams
- 2010: Indeportes Antioquia
- 2012: Empacadora San Marcos
- 2012: Formesan–IDRD–Pinturas Bler
- 2014: EPM–UNE–Área Metropolitana

Professional teams
- 1998–2003: Kelme–Costa Blanca
- 2004: Phonak
- 2005–2006: T-Mobile Team
- 2007: Relax–GAM
- 2008–2010: Rock Racing
- 2011: Gobernación de Antioquia–Indeportes Antioquia
- 2013: EPM–UNE
- 2015–2016: EPM–UNE–Área Metropolitana
- 2017–: Medellín–Inder

Major wins
- Stage races Tour of Hainan (2023) Vuelta a Asturias (2006)

Óscar Miguel Sevilla Rivera (born 29 September 1976), nicknamed El Niño, is a Spanish-Colombian professional road bicycle racer, who currently rides for UCI Continental team Team Medellín–EPM. He is a climber with a pedigree in stage races, having finished in the top ten of the Tour de France and Vuelta a España several times.

== Biography ==
=== Kelme–Costa Blanca (1998–2003) ===
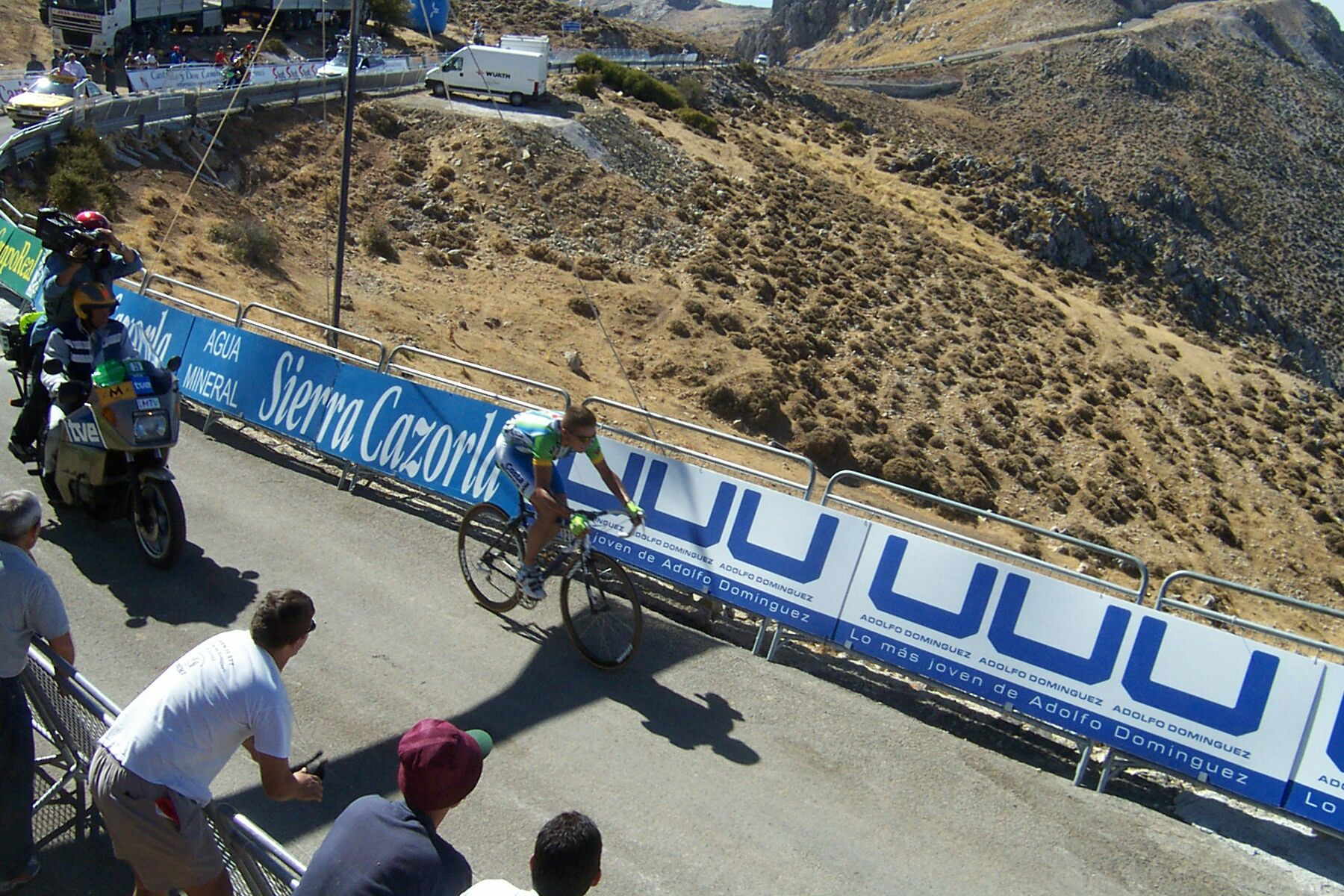
Sevilla riding for Kelme in 2002

Born in Ossa de Montiel, Albacete Province, Sevilla turned professional in 1998 for Spanish team Kelme–Costa Blanca, and his big breakthrough came in the 2001 Tour de France. Here, he showed himself as a great climber, ranking 7th in the overall General classification, and winning the young rider classification as the rider of 25 years of age or younger with the highest position in the general classification. After the Tour de France, he continued his great form in the 2001 Vuelta a España. He wore the leader's jersey until the final uphill time trial stage in Madrid, which he lost to winner Ángel Casero.

In the 2002 Vuelta a España, intra-team rivalry with Aitor González saw him finish fourth in the General classification, despite the team's initial assurances that he would be the only leader. González's racing in the very difficult Angliru mountain stage saw Sevilla lose valuable time that he was not able to recover in the later stages of the race, and Gonzalez took over the lead on the final stage, overtaking previous leader Roberto Heras. After a lacklustre 2003 season, Sevilla was injured in the 2003 UCI Road World Championships in a crash, resulting in a serious back injury.

=== Phonak (2004) ===
The 2004 season saw Sevilla start with the Swiss team Phonak in support of Tyler Hamilton's bid for the 2004 Tour de France. As Hamilton sustained an injury, Sevilla assumed the leader's mantle, although without good results. He then switched to T-Mobile Team for the 2005 season.

=== T-Mobile (2005–06) ===
Sevilla switched to T-Mobile Team for the 2005 season, but fought to achieve the same results as he initially rode as a domestique for Jan Ullrich in the 2005 Tour de France. Here, he helped Ullrich finish 3rd overall, and Sevilla's climbing improved, as well as his morale. He rode the 2005 Vuelta a España as team captain and ranked 7th overall.

He was linked to Operación Puerto doping case. After he was initially named in the investigation, Sevilla was still able to ride and won the Vuelta a Asturias. On the day before the 2006 Tour de France, Ullrich and Sevilla were explicitly linked to the investigation and not allowed to start the race. On 20 July 2006, Sevilla was fired from T-Mobile in relation to the aforementioned accusations.

=== Relax–GAM and Rock Racing (2007–10) ===
He rode for Relax–GAM for the 2007 season and Rock Racing–Murcia between 2008 and 2010.

=== Colombian teams (2011–present) ===
He rode for Gobernación de Antioquía in the 2011 Tour of Utah. Sevilla renewed his contract with the Colombian Medellín team, with whom he had been racing since 2017, for another season in November 2019.

== Personal life ==
He currently lives in Colombia, having married a Colombian woman with whom he has two daughters, and became a Colombian citizen in 2012.

== Major results ==
1999
6th Overall Tour du Limousin
7th Overall Tour de Romandie

1st Stage 4

2000
1st Trofeo Luis Ocaña
1st Memorial Manuel Galera
2nd Overall Volta a Catalunya
2nd Overall Vuelta a Burgos
6th Circuito de Getxo
6th Subida a Urkiola
2001
2nd Overall Vuelta a España
2nd Subida al Naranco
3rd Overall Escalada a Montjuïc

1st Stage 1b (ITT)

3rd Clásica a los Puertos de Guadarrama
4th Overall Tour de Romandie
4th Overall Vuelta a Burgos
5th Overall Volta a Catalunya
7th Overall Tour de France

1st Young rider classification

2002
1st Stage 1b Escalada a Montjuïc
2nd Classique des Alpes
3rd Subida al Naranco
3rd Clásica a los Puertos de Guadarrama
4th Overall Vuelta a España
4th Coppa Ugo Agostoni
6th Overall Vuelta a Castilla y León
2004
3rd Overall Critérium du Dauphiné Libéré
6th Classique des Alpes
9th Overall Escalada a Montjuïc
2005
6th Overall Escalada a Montjuïc
7th Overall Vuelta a España
2006
1st Overall Vuelta a Asturias

1st Points classification
1st Stage 2

2007
1st Overall Route du Sud

1st Stage 2

5th Overall Volta a Catalunya

1st Stage 4

5th Overall Vuelta a Castilla y León
5th Overall Escalada a Montjuïc
6th Overall Tour of Austria
7th Overall Vuelta a Asturias
8th Overall Euskal Bizikleta
9th Overall Volta a Portugal
2008
1st Overall Clásico RCN
1st Reading Classic
2nd Road race, Spanish National Road Championships
5th Overall Tour of Qinghai Lake
6th Overall Tour de Georgia
9th Overall Vuelta a Colombia

1st Stage 9

2009
1st Overall Vuelta a Chihuahua
1st Overall Cascade Cycling Classic
1st Stage 2 Vuelta a Asturias
4th Overall Vuelta a la Comunidad de Madrid

1st Mountains classification

4th Vuelta a La Rioja
2010
1st Overall Vuelta Mexico Telmex
1st Overall Vuelta a Antioquia
1st Overall Clásica Nacional Marco Fidel Suárez

1st Stage 1

2nd Overall Vuelta a Colombia

1st Stages 1 (TTT) & 14 (ITT)

2011
1st Overall GP Internacional de Café

1st Prologue & Stage 1

1st Overall Vuelta a Antioquia
1st Prologue Vuelta al Valle del Cauca
1st Prologue Vuelta al Tolima
4th Overall Tour of Utah
5th Overall Vuelta a Colombia

1st Stages 3 (TTT), 8 & 9

2012
1st Overall Vuelta Mexico Telmex

1st Stage 2

1st Overall Vuelta a Boyacá

1st Stages 2 & 5

1st Overall Clásico RCN

1st Points classification
1st Prologue, Stages 3 & 9

1st Overall Vuelta a Chiriquí

1st Stage 6

2nd Overall Clásica Nacional Ciudad de Anapoima
2nd Overall Vuelta al Tolima
4th Overall Vuelta a Cundinamarca

1st Stage 3

2013
1st Overall Vuelta a Colombia

1st Stage 4

1st Overall Tour do Rio

1st Stage 4

1st Overall Clásica Rionegro con Futuro-Aguas de Rionegro

1st Prologue, Stages 1 & 2

1st Overall Clásica Nacional Ciudad de Anapoima

1st Stages 2 & 3

1st Overall Vuelta al Tolima

1st Prologue & Stage 2

1st Overall Vuelta a Antioquia

1st Stages 1 & 3

1st Stage 10 Clásico RCN
2nd Overall Clásica de Fusagasugá

1st Stage 1

2014
1st Overall Vuelta a Colombia

1st Points classification
1st Stages 1 (TTT) & 5

1st Overall Tour do Rio

1st Stage 1

1st Overall Vuelta al Tolima

1st Prologue, Stages 3 & 4

1st Overall Clásica Nacional Ciudad de Anapoima

1st Stages 2 & 3

1st Overall Vuelta al Valle del Cauca

1st Stage 3

1st Overall Clásica Rionegro con Futuro-Aguas de Rionegro

1st Stage 1

1st Overall Clásica de Fusagasugá

1st Stage 3

1st Stage 3 Clásica Club Deportivo Boyacá
1st Stage 3 Clásico RCN
Vuelta a Chiriquí

1st Stages 1 & 5

2nd 2013–14 UCI America Tour
3rd Overall Vuelta a Guatemala

1st Stages 1a (ITT) & 5

4th Overall Volta de Ciclismo Internacional do Estado de São Paulo
4th Overall Vuelta a Antioquia
2015
1st Overall Vuelta a Colombia

1st Points classification
1st Stages 1 (TTT), 9 & 13 (ITT)

1st Overall Clásica Nacional Ciudad de Anapoima

1st Stage 2

1st Overall Vuelta a Antioquia

1st Stage 1

1st Overall Vuelta a Chiriquí

1st Stages 3 & 9

1st Overall Vuelta al Valle del Cauca

1st Stage 3

1st Tocancipá
1st Stage 2 Clásica Nacional Marco Fidel Suárez
1st Stage 2 Clásica Rionegro con Futuro-Aguas de Rionegro
2nd Overall Vuelta Mexico Telmex
2nd Overall Circuito Internacional Baja California Sur
6th Overall Tour do Rio

1st Stage 1

2016
1st Team time trial, Colombian National Road Championships
1st Overall Vuelta al Valle del Cauca

1st Stages 4 & 5

1st Overall Clásica Nacional Ciudad de Anapoima

1st Stages 1 & 3

1st Overall Vuelta a Antioquia

1st Stage 3

1st Overall Vuelta a Santander

1st Stage 1

1st Overall Clásico RCN

1st Stage 2

Vuelta a Chiriquí

1st Stages 2 (TTT), 5 & 8

2nd Overall Vuelta a Colombia

1st Points classification
1st Stage 1 (ITT)

3rd Overall Clasico El Colombiano
4th Overall Clásica Ramón Emilio Arcila
5th Overall Clásica Club Deportivo Boyacá

1st Stage 2

2017
1st Overall Vuelta a la Comunidad de Madrid
1st Overall Vuelta al Valle del Cauca

1st Stages 2 & 3

1st Overall Clásica Nacional Ciudad de Anapoima

1st Stages 1 & 3

1st Stage 7 Clásico RCN
2nd Overall Vuelta a San Juan
2nd Overall Tour of Ankara

1st Points classification
1st Stage 4

2nd Overall Vuelta a Asturias

1st Points classification
1st Stage 3

4th Winston-Salem Cycling Classic
6th Overall Vuelta a Castilla y León
8th Overall Vuelta a Colombia
2018
1st Overall Vuelta a San Juan

1st Stage 5

1st Overall Vuelta al Ecuador

1st Stage 1

2nd Gran Premio FECOCI
3rd Overall Vuelta a Colombia
4th Overall Clásico RCN

1st Points classification
1st Stage 5

2019
1st Overall Vuelta Ciclista de Chile

1st Prologue, Stages 2 & 4 (ITT)

1st Overall Clásico RCN

1st Points classification
1st Stage 2

1st Overall Vuelta a Chiloé

1st Prologue & Stages 2 & 4

1st Sprints classification, Tour Colombia
2nd Overall Vuelta a la Independencia Nacional

1st Stage 6

2nd Overall Tour of the Gila
2nd Overall Tour of Qinghai Lake

1st Stage 1 (TTT)

3rd Overall Vuelta a San Juan
3rd Overall Vuelta a Colombia

1st Prologue & Stage 10

8th Overall Tour of Taihu Lake
2020
2nd Overall Vuelta a Colombia

1st Stage 7

2nd Overall Clásico RCN

1st Points classification
1st Stages 1 (TTT) & 5

2nd Gran Premio de la Patagonia
3rd Overall Vuelta a San Juan
2021
1st Stage 1 (TTT) Vuelta a Antioquia
2nd Overall Vuelta al Táchira

1st Stage 4 (ITT)

2nd Overall Clásico RCN

1st Stage 1 (TTT)

3rd Overall Joe Martin Stage Race
3rd Overall Clásica de Guayaquil

1st Stage 1

8th Overall Vuelta a Colombia

1st Prologue

8th Overall Tour du Rwanda
2022
1st Overall Clásica de Guayaquil
1st Mountains classification, Vuelta del Porvenir San Luis
1st Sprints classification, Tour of South Florida
2023
1st Overall Tour of Hainan
1st Overall Vuelta Bantrab

1st Stage 1

1st Overall Clásica de Rionegro

1st Stage 1 (TTT)

1st Overall Tour de Panamá

1st Mountains classification
1st Stage 1 (TTT)

1st Stage 5 Clásico RCN
2nd Overall Vuelta a Formosa Internacional

1st Stage 4a (ITT)

2nd Overall Tour of the Gila

1st Stage 5

3rd Clásica de Villeta
6th Overall Vuelta a Colombia
7th Overall Joe Martin Stage Race
8th Overall Tour de Catamarca
10th Overall Tour of Qinghai Lake
2024
1st Stage 1 Vuelta al Ecuador
1st Stage 1 (ITT) Clásico RCN
3rd Overall Tour do Rio
6th Overall Tour of the Gila
2025
1st Overall Vuelta a la Independencia Nacional
3rd Overall Tour de Beauce
8th Overall Vuelta al Tolima
10th Overall Tour of Hainan
1st Doglocy classic
2nd Overall Tour de Panamá

1st Stage 1

2026
1st Stage 1 (TTT) Clásica de Rionegro
7th Overall Tour de Beauce

=== Grand Tour general classification results timeline ===
Grand Tour	1998	1999	2000	2001	2002	2003	2004	2005
Giro d'Italia	DNF	13	16	—	—	—	—	—
Tour de France	—	—	—	7	DNF	—	24	18
Vuelta a España	—	—	14	2	4	12	22	7

Legend
—	Did not compete
DNF	Did not finish
