= 2007 Vuelta a Asturias =

Race details
- Dates: 3–7 May 2007
- Stages: 5
- Distance: 807 km (501.4 mi)
- Winning time: 19h 41' 56"

Results
Jersey awarded to the overall winner	Winner	Koldo Gil (ESP)	(Saunier Duval–Prodir)
	Second	Alberto Fernández de la Puebla (ESP)	(Saunier Duval–Prodir)
	Third	John-Lee Augustyn (RSA)	(Barloworld)

The 2007 Vuelta a Asturias was the 51st edition of the Vuelta a Asturias road cycling stage race, which was held from 3 May to 7 May 2007. The race started and finished in Oviedo. The race was won by Koldo Gil of the Saunier Duval–Prodir team.

== General classification ==
Final general classification

Rank	Rider	Team	Time
1	Koldo Gil (ESP)	Saunier Duval–Prodir	19h 41' 56"
2	Alberto Fernández de la Puebla (ESP)	Saunier Duval–Prodir	+ 11"
3	John-Lee Augustyn (RSA)	Barloworld	+ 50"
4	Francisco Mancebo (ESP)	Relax–GAM	+ 53"
5	David Bernabeu (ESP)	Fuerteventura–Canarias	+ 57"
6	Danail Petrov (BUL)	Benfica	+ 1' 12"
7	Óscar Sevilla (ESP)	Relax–GAM	+ 1' 19"
8	David Muñoz (ESP)	Fuerteventura–Canarias	+ 1' 29"
9	Jorge Ferrío (ESP)	Andalucía–Cajasur	+ 1' 35"
10	Jaume Rovira (ESP)	Viña Magna–Cropu	+ 1' 38"
