= 2006 Vuelta a Asturias =

Race details
- Dates: 16–20 June 2006
- Stages: 5
- Distance: 851 km (528.8 mi)
- Winning time: 20h 34' 54"

Results
Jersey awarded to the overall winner	Winner	Óscar Sevilla (ESP)	(T-Mobile Team)
	Second	Eladio Jiménez (ESP)	(Comunidad Valenciana)
	Third	Luca Mazzanti (ITA)	(Ceramica Panaria–Navigare)

The 2006 Vuelta a Asturias was the 50th edition of the Vuelta a Asturias road cycling stage race, which was held from 16 June to 20 June 2006. The race started and finished in Oviedo. The race was won by Óscar Sevilla of the T-Mobile Team team.

== General classification ==
Final general classification

Rank	Rider	Team	Time
1	Óscar Sevilla (ESP)	T-Mobile Team	20h 34' 54"
2	Eladio Jiménez (ESP)	Comunidad Valenciana	+ 1' 20"
3	Luca Mazzanti (ITA)	Ceramica Panaria–Navigare	+ 1' 43"
4	Adolfo García Quesada (ESP)	Andalucía–Paul Versan	+ 2' 36"
5	Rubén Plaza (ESP)	Comunidad Valenciana	+ 3' 27"
6	Andrea Tonti (ITA)	Acqua & Sapone	+ 3' 28"
7	Jesus Ramirez Torres (ESP)	Extremadura–Spiuk	+ 3' 35"
8	Daniel Moreno (ESP)	Relax–GAM	+ 4' 02"
9	Amets Txurruka (ESP)	Barloworld	+ 5' 07"
10	Jesus Tendero Marcos (ESP)	Viña Magna–Cropu	+ 6' 24"
