= Nu Colombia =

Colombian cycling team

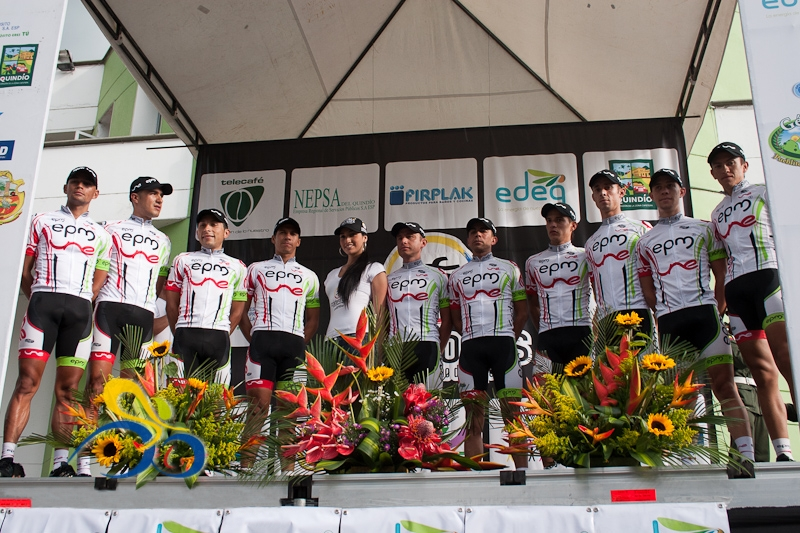

Team information
- UCI code: TNC
- Registered: Colombia
- Founded: 1999
- Discipline: Road
- Status: Club (1999–2000, 2002, 2004–2006, 2008–2009, 2014, 2021–2023); Trade Team III (2001); Trade Team II (2003); UCI Continental (2007, 2010–2013, 2015–2020, 2024–)
- Bicycles: Trek

Key personnel
- General manager: Raúl Mesa
- Team manager: Gabriel Jaime Mesa

Team name history
- 1999–2005 2006 2007 2008 2009 2010–2013 2014–2016 2017–2019 2020–2023 2024–: 05 Orbitel; Orbitel–EPM; UNE–Orbitel; UNE; UNE–EPM; EPM–UNE; EPM–UNE–Área Metropolitana; EPM; EPM–Scott; Nu Colombia

Nu Colombia, formerly known as EPM, is a Colombian professional cycling team. In 2012, the team participated in the UCI America Tour.

== Team roster ==
As of 22 January 2024.

Rider	Date of birth
Anderson Arboleda (COL)	5 July 2001 (age 25)
Andrés Camilo Ardila (COL)	2 June 1999 (age 27)
Jhonatan Stiven Chaves (COL)	13 February 2001 (age 25)
Rodrigo Contreras (COL)	2 June 1994 (age 32)
Heberth Alejandro Gutiérrez (COL)	17 September 1999 (age 26)
Sergio Henao (COL)	10 December 1987 (age 38)
Manuel David Herrera (COL)	22 April 2002 (age 24)

Rider	Date of birth
Daniel Méndez (COL)	2 June 2000 (age 26)
Mateo Mondragon (COL)	10 April 2002 (age 24)
Cristian Camilo Muñoz (COL)	20 March 1996 (age 30)
Daniel Muñoz (COL)	21 November 1996 (age 29)
Rafael Steven Pineda (COL)	22 April 1999 (age 27)
Óscar Quiroz (COL)	3 July 1994 (age 32)

== Doping ==
On 28 November 2017 news broke that Edward Díaz had tested positive for CERA at the 2017 Vuelta a Colombia.

== Major wins ==
2007
Colombia Road Race Championships, Fidel Chacón
Colombia Time Trial Championships, Santiago Botero
Overall Vuelta a Colombia, Santiago Botero

Prologue, Stages 6 & 14, Santiago Botero

2008
Overall Vuelta a Colombia, Giovanny Báez

Stage 2, Jhon García

2009
Stage 11 Vuelta a Colombia, Giovanny Báez
2010
Stage 2 Vuelta a Cuba, Jaime Castañeda
Overall Volta de Gravatai, Jaime Castañeda

Stage 1, Julian Muñoz
Stage 2, Juan Pablo Suárez

Overall Tour de Santa Catarina, Edwar Ortiz

Stage 2, Edwar Ortiz
Stage 5, Giovanny Báez

Stage 2 Vuelta a Colombia, Jaime Castañeda
Stage 13 Vuelta a Colombia, Javier Alberto González
Overall Vuelta a Guatemala, Giovanny Báez

Stages 2 & 3, Juan Pablo Suárez
Stages 7 & 9, Giovanny Báez

2011
Stage 6a Vuelta a la Independencia Nacional, Rafael Infantino
Stages 7 & 8 Vuelta a la Independencia Nacional, Jaime Castañeda
Stage 3 Vuelta a la Comunidad de Madrid, Giovanny Báez
Stage 1 Vuelta a Colombia, Walter Pedraza
Overall Tour do Rio, Juan Pablo Suárez

Stage 3, Juan Pablo Suárez

2012
Stage 9 Vuelta a la Independencia Nacional, Jaime Vergara
Overall Vuelta a Guatemala, Ramiro Rincón

Stage 3, Freddy Piamonte
Stage 5, Isaac Bolivár
Stage 6, Javier Eduardo Gomez
Stage 7, Oscar Rivera

Overall Vuelta al Mundo Maya, Giovanny Báez

Stage 5, Giovanny Báez

2013
Colombia Road Race Championships, Walter Pedraza
Overall Vuelta a Colombia, Óscar Sevilla

Stage 1, Edwar Ortiz
Stage 4, Óscar Sevilla

Overall Tour do Rio, Óscar Sevilla

Stage 1, Weimar Roldán
Stage 3, Camilo Castiblanco
Stage 4, Óscar Sevilla

2014
Stage 7 Tour do Brasil, Walter Pedraza
Overall Vuelta a Colombia, Óscar Sevilla

Stage 1, Team time trial
Stage 3, Weimar Roldán
Stage 5, Óscar Sevilla

Overall Tour do Rio, Óscar Sevilla

Stage 1, Óscar Sevilla

2015
Overall Vuelta a la Independencia Nacional, Róbigzon Oyola

Stages 2 & 6, Jaime Castañeda

Overall Vuelta a Colombia, Óscar Sevilla

Stage 1, Team time trial
Stage 8, Rafael Infantino
Stages 9 & 13 (ITT), Óscar Sevilla
Stage 11, Juan Pablo Suárez

Stage 1 Tour do Rio, Óscar Sevilla
Stage 3 Tour do Rio, Weimar Roldán
2016
Colombia Team Time Trial Championships (Note: The riders that competed were Weimar Roldán, Óscar Sevilla, Fabio Duarte, Róbigzon Oyola, Juan Pablo Suárez, Óscar Álvarez.)
Stage 1 (ITT) Vuelta a Colombia, Óscar Sevilla
Stage 12 Vuelta a Colombia, Juan Pablo Suárez
2017
Stage 1 Vuelta a Colombia, Team time trial
Stage 4 Vuelta a Colombia, Juan Pablo Suárez
2021
Stage 5 Vuelta a Colombia, Aldemar Reyes

== National champions ==
2007
Colombian Time Trial, Santiago Botero
Colombian Road Race, Fidel Chacón
2013
Colombian Road Race, Walter Pedraza
2016
Colombian Team Time Trial
