= Mauricio Ortega (cyclist) =

Colombian racing cyclist

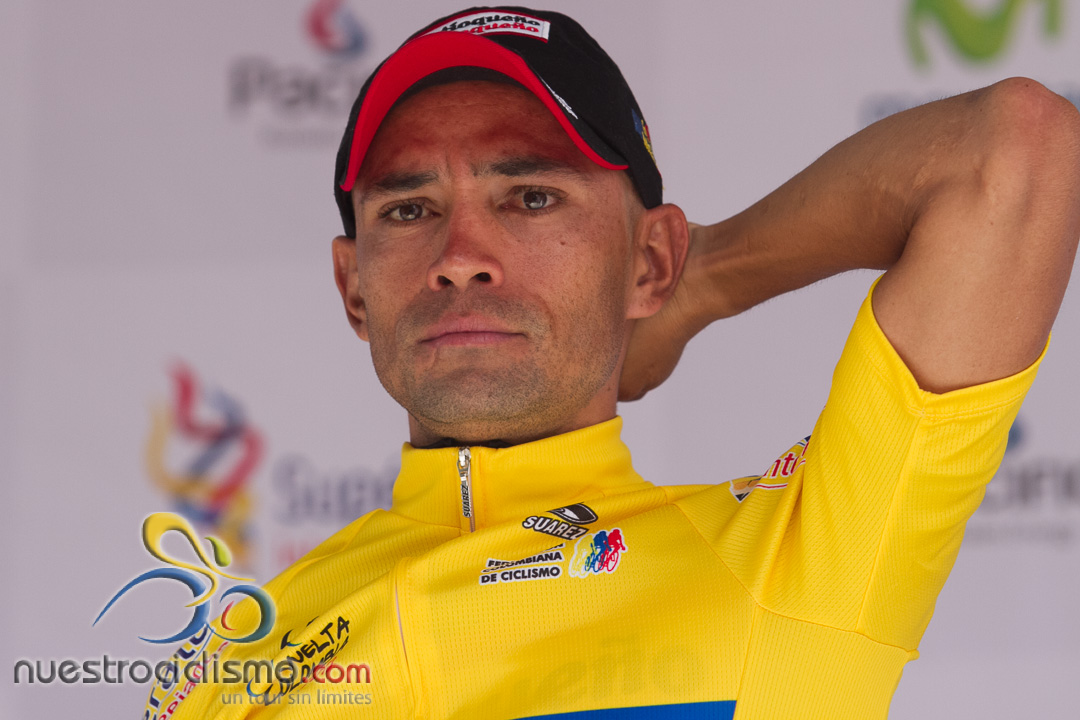
- Ortega at the 2013 Vuelta a Colombia.

Personal information
- Full name: Mauricio Alberto Ortega Ramírez
- Born: October 22, 1980 (age 45) Salgar, Antioquia, Colombia

Cycling career
- Sport: Cycling
- Discipline: Road
- Role: Rider
- Rider type: All-rounder

Amateur teams
- 2003: EPM.net
- 2004: Salamanca Patrimonio de la Humanidad
- 2005: Castilla Caja La Mancha
- 2006: Atom Azpiru puis Drapeau
- 2007: GW Bicicletas Shimano29
- 2008: UNE30
- 2009: UNE–EPM
- 2013: Aguardiente Antioqueño–Lotería de Medellín–IDEA
- 2016: Supergiros–Redetrans
- 2018: Supergiros

Professional teams
- 2009–2012: UNE–EPM
- 2015: Orgullo Antioqueño
- 2016–2017: RTS–Santic Racing Team
- 2018: Ningxia Sports Lottery–Livall Cycling Team

Major wins
- Clásico RCN (2009)

Mauricio Alberto Ortega Ramírez (born October 22, 1980) is a Colombian professional road racing cyclist, who last rode for the Ningxia Sports Lottery–Livall Cycling Team.

== Major results ==
2002
1st Time trial, Pan American Under-23 Road Championships
2003
1st Young rider classification Vuelta a Colombia
3rd Overall Vuelta a Guatemala

1st Stage 5

7th Overall Clásico RCN
2004
3rd Overall Vuelta a la Comunidad de Madrid
2006
1st Stage 4 Clásico RCN
2007
5th Overall Vuelta a Colombia
2008
2nd Overall Clásico RCN

1st Stage 5

3rd Overall Vuelta a Colombia
2009
1st Overall Clásico RCN
4th Overall Vuelta a Colombia
2011
1st Stage 4 Clásico RCN
2012
1st Mountains classification Vuelta a la Comunidad de Madrid
2013
3rd Overall Vuelta a Colombia

1st Stage 7

2014
4th Overall Vuelta a Colombia
6th Overall Vuelta a Guatemala
2015
1st Mountains classification Tour de Beauce
2nd Overall Vuelta a Colombia
2016
1st Overall Vuelta a Colombia

1st Mountains classification
1st Stages 6 (ITT) & 7

1st Mountains classification Tour of Qinghai Lake
3rd Overall Tour of China I
5th Overall Tour of Hainan
6th Overall Tour of Taihu Lake
7th Overall Tour of Fuzhou
2017
1st Mountains classification Tour of China I
2nd Overall Tour of Qinghai Lake

1st Mountains classification

3rd Overall Tour of China II
6th Overall Tour de Taiwan
