= Alex Cano =

Colombian cyclist (born 1983)

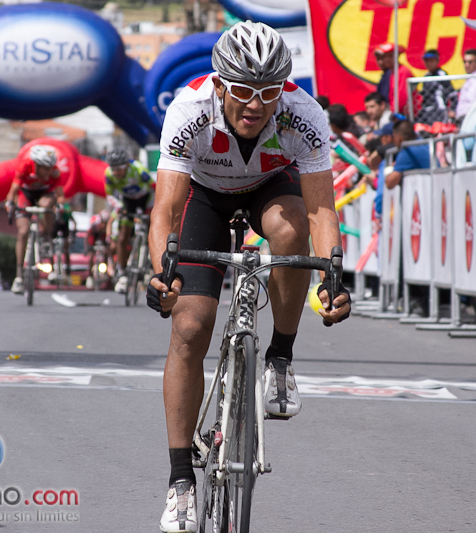
- Cano at the 2012 Clásico RCN.

Personal information
- Full name: Alex Alberto Cano Ardila
- Born: 13 March 1983 (age 43) Yarumal, Antioquia, Colombia

Cycling career
- Sport: Cycling
- Current team: Suspended
- Discipline: Road
- Role: Rider
- Rider type: Climbing specialist

Amateur teams
- 2006: Maltinti Lampadari Salgomma
- 2007: Unidelta Arvedi Bottoli
- 2013–2014: Aguardiente Antioqueño–Lotería de Medellín–IDEA

Professional teams
- 2009–2011: Colombia es Pasión–Coldeportes
- 2012: Gobernación de Antioquia–Indeportes Antioquia
- 2015: Colombia
- 2017–2019: Coldeportes–Zenú

Alex Alberto Cano Ardila (born March 13, 1983) is a Colombian road racing cyclist, who is currently suspended from the sport, after a biological passport violation. He was named in the start list for the 2015 Vuelta a España.

== Major results ==
2003
3rd Overall Vuelta a Uraba
2006
1st Coppa Penna
1st Stage 9 Girobio
2007
1st Overall Giro della Valle d'Aosta

1st Mountains classification
1st Stages 3 & 6

2nd Overall Giro delle Valli Cuneesi

1st Stage 4

5th Trofeo Gianfranco Bianchin
10th Giro del Belvedere
2008
2nd Overall Clasica Marinilla

1st Stage 3

10th Overall Clásico RCN

1st Stage 6

2009
1st Stage 4 Vuelta a Antioquia
10th Prueba Villafranca de Ordizia
2010
7th Overall Vuelta a Asturias
8th Overall Vuelta a Colombia
2012
1st Overall Vuelta a Antioquia
1st Stage 7 Vuelta Internacional de Higuito
2nd Overall Clásico RCN
6th Overall Vuelta Mexico Telmex

1st Mountains classification
1st Stages 4 & 7 (ITT)

7th Overall Vuelta a Colombia
2013
2nd Overall Vuelta a Colombia
2014
1st Overall Vuelta a Guatemala

1st Stages 3 & 4

1st Stage 8 Clásico RCN
2015
4th Overall Tour of Turkey
9th Time trial, Pan American Games
2016
~~3rd Overall Vuelta a Colombia~~
2017
2nd Overall Vuelta a Colombia

1st Stages 5 & 8 (ITT)

2018
1st Overall Clásico RCN

=== Grand Tour general classification results timeline ===
Grand Tour	2015
Giro d'Italia	—
Tour de France	—
Vuelta a España	~~53~~

Legend
—	Did not compete
DNF	Did not finish
~~No.~~	Results expunged

=== Other major stage races ===
Race	2011	2012	2013	2014	2015
Tirreno–Adriatico	—	—	—	—	28
Volta a Catalunya	57	—	—	—	27
Paris–Nice	Has not contested during his career
Tour of the Basque Country	Has not contested during his career
Tour de Romandie	Has not contested during his career
Critérium du Dauphiné	Has not contested during his career
Tour de Suisse	Has not contested during his career
