= 2011 Vuelta a Colombia =

2010–11 UCI America Tour

Race details
- Dates: 12–26 June 2011
- Stages: 13
- Distance: 2,056.8 km (1,278.0 mi)
- Winning time: 49h 36' 49"

Results
Jersey awarded to the overall winner	Winner	Félix Cárdenas (COL)
	Second	Giovanni Báez (COL)
	Third	Freddy Montaña (COL)

The 61st edition of the Vuelta a Colombia was held from 12 to 26 June 2011. It was won by Colombian cyclist Félix Cárdenas.
