= Dalivier Ospina =

Colombian bicycle racer

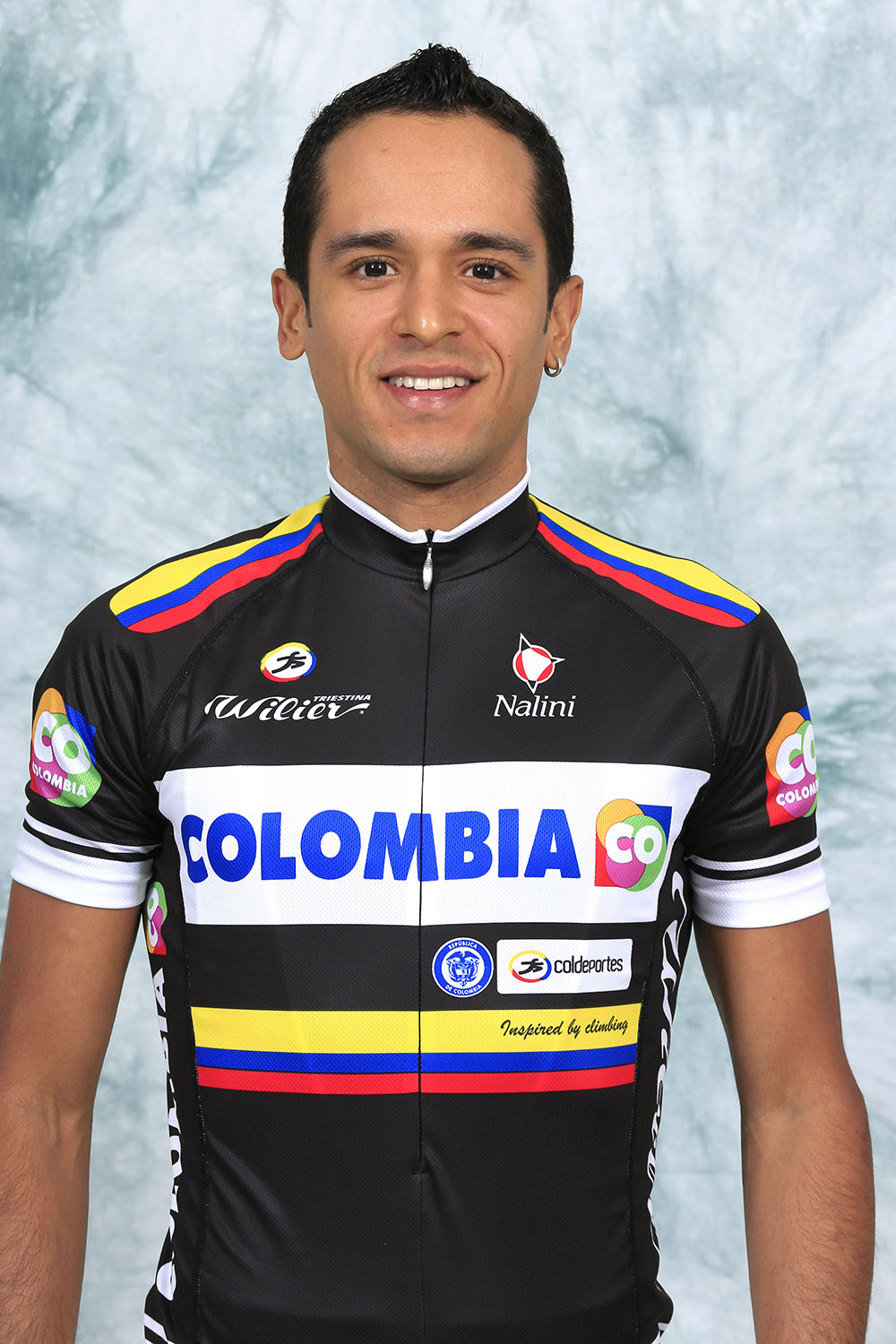
- Ospina in 2013

Personal information
- Full name: Dalivier Ospina Navarro
- Born: October 9, 1985 (age 41) Palmira, Colombia

Cycling career
- Sport: Cycling
- Discipline: Road
- Role: Rider

Amateur teams
- 2008: AVC Aix-en-Provence
- 2014–2015: Supergiros–Blanco del Valle–Redetrans
- 2016: Coldeportes–Claro

Professional teams
- 2010–2011: Café de Colombia–Colombia es Pasión
- 2012–2013: Colombia–Coldeportes
- 2017–2018: Coldeportes–Zenú

Dalivier Ospina Navarro (born October 9, 1985) is a Colombian cyclist, who last rode for UCI Continental team Coldeportes–Zenú–Sello Rojo. He rode in the 2013 Giro d'Italia.

== Major results ==
2005
1st Time trial, National Under-23 Road Championships
2006
1st Prix des Vins Valloton
1st Sierre-Loye
2007
3rd Overall Tour des Pays de Savoie
2009
7th Overall Mi-Août en Bretagne
2010
8th Subida al Naranco
2012
8th Coppa Sabatini
