= Juan Pablo Suárez (cyclist) =

Colombian bicycle racer (born 1985)

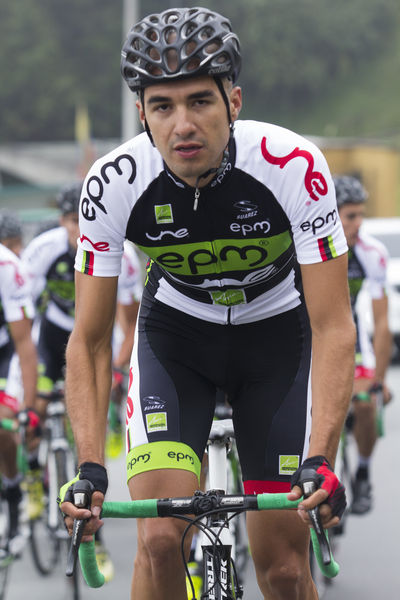
- Suárez in 2014.

Personal information
- Full name: Juan Pablo Suárez Suárez
- Born: May 30, 1985 (age 41) Medellín, Colombia

Cycling career
- Sport: Cycling
- Current team: Team Petrolike
- Discipline: Road
- Role: Rider

Amateur teams
- 2006: S.C. Etruria Team Ciaponi Edilizia
- 2007: Aguardiente Antioqueño–IDEA
- 2008: Indeportes–Antioquia
- 2009: UNE–EPM
- 2014: EPM–UNE–Área Metropolitana
- 2021–2022: EPM–Scott
- 2023–: Team Petrolike

Professional teams
- 2010–2011: EPM–UNE
- 2012–2013: Colombia–Coldeportes
- 2015–2018: EPM–UNE–Área Metropolitana
- 2019: GW–Shimano
- 2020: EPM–Scott
Medal record
Men's road bicycle racing
Representing Colombia
Pan American Championships
Bronze medal – third place	2014 Puebla	Road race

Juan Pablo Suárez (born May 30, 1985) is a Colombian cyclist, who currently rides for Mexican amateur team, Team Petrolike. In 2011 he won the Tour do Rio with his teammates finishing in 2nd, 3rd, 4th and 6th places.

== Major results ==
2003
1st Time trial, Pan American Junior Road Championships
2009
1st Stage 1 (TTT) Clásico RCN
2010
1st Stage 9 Clásico RCN
2nd Overall Volta Ciclística Internacional de Gravataí

1st Stage 2

2nd Overall Vuelta a Guatemala

1st Stages 2 & 3

4th Overall Tour de Santa Catarina
5th Overall Vuelta a Colombia
9th Overall Vuelta a Cuba
2011
1st Overall Tour do Rio

1st Stage 3

2nd Vuelta a La Rioja
5th Gran Premio de Llodio
6th Overall Vuelta a Castilla y León
7th Overall Vuelta a Asturias
10th Overall Vuelta a la Independencia Nacional
2014
Pan American Road Championships

3rd Road race
4th Time trial

3rd Road race, National Road Championships
7th Overall Tour do Rio
8th Overall Vuelta a Colombia

1st Stage 1 (TTT)

10th Overall Vuelta a Guatemala
2015
Vuelta a Colombia

1st Stages 1 (TTT) & 11

9th Overall Vuelta a la Independencia Nacional
10th Overall Tour do Rio
2016
1st Team time trial, National Road Championships
1st Stage 12 Vuelta a Colombia
2017
1st Road race, Bolivarian Games
1st Overall Clásico RCN
3rd Overall Vuelta a Colombia

1st Stages 1 (TTT) & 4

2018
2nd Overall Vuelta a Colombia

1st Stage 5

3rd Road race, South American Games
2021
5th Road race, National Road Championships
6th Overall Vuelta a Colombia
2023
7th Overall Vuelta Bantrab
