= Vuelta del Paraguay =

Race details
- Date: December
- Region: Paraguay
- English name: Tour of Paraguay
- Local name: Vuelta a Paraguay (in Spanish)
- Discipline: Road
- Competition: UCI America Tour
- Type: Stage race

History
- First edition: 1993
- Editions: 10 (as of 2014)
- First winner: Walter Castellasi (PAR)
- Most recent: Alcides Vieira (BRA)

The Vuelta del Paraguay is the most important road bicycle race in the State of Paraguay. The first edition of the race was held in 1993. It was organized as a 2.2 event on the UCI America Tour in 2010. The race has not been held since 2014.

== Winners ==
| Year | Country | Rider | Team |
|---|---|---|---|
| 1993 | Paraguay | Walter Castellasi | |
| 1994 | Paraguay | Ademir Scalon | |
| 1995 | Argentina | Luis Moyano | |
| 1996 | Paraguay | Robertson Figueiro | |
| 1997 | Uruguay | Primo Santi | |
| 1998 | Uruguay | Gustavo Figueredo | Club Nacional de Football |
| 1999 | Uruguay | Ricardo Guedes | |
| 2000 | No race | | |
| 2001 | Brazil | Eber Moreno | |
| 2002; 2009 | No race | | |
| 2010 | Uruguay | Luis Alberto Martínez | Equipo Porongos |
| 2011; 2013 | No race | | |
| 2014 | Brazil | Alcides Vieira | |
