= Sergio Henao =

Colombian racing cyclist

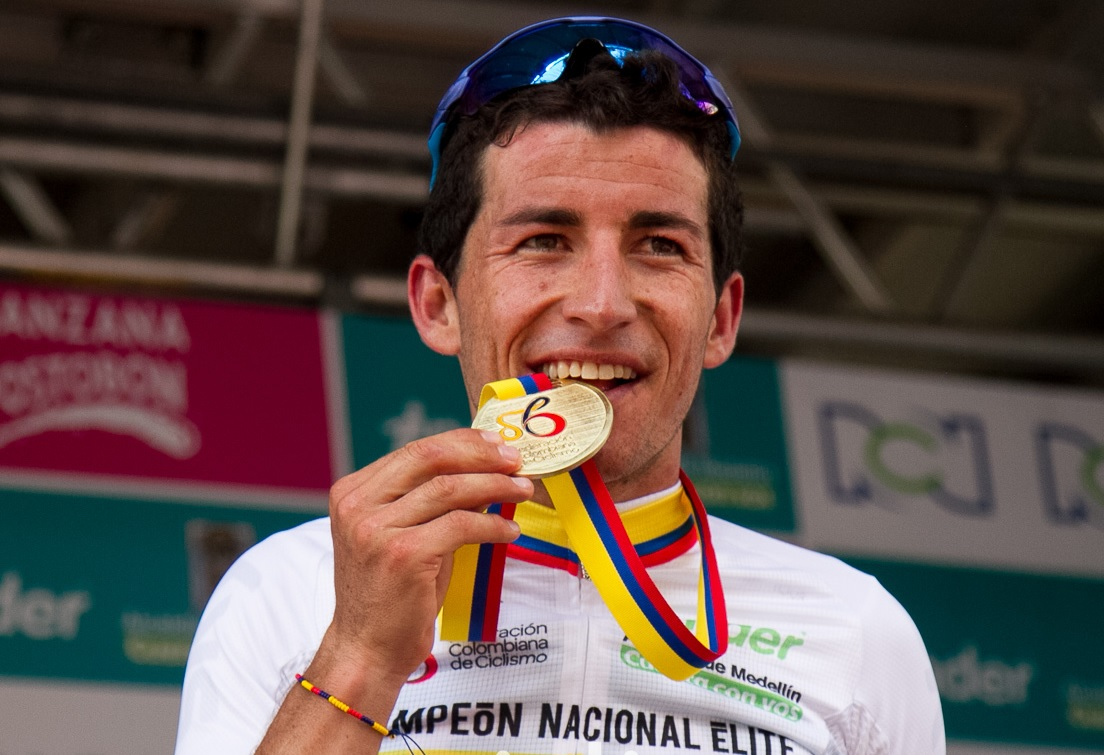
- Henao in 2018

Personal information
- Full name: Sergio Luis Henao Montoya
- Nickname: El Venao
- Born: 10 December 1987 (age 38) Rionegro, Colombia
- Height: 1.70 m (5 ft 7 in)
- Weight: 61 kg (134 lb; 9 st 8 lb)

Cycling career
- Sport: Cycling
- Current team: Nu Colombia
- Discipline: Road
- Role: Rider
- Rider type: Climbing specialist

Amateur teams
- 2005–2006: Aguardiente Antioqueño–Lotería de Medellín
- 2007–2009: Colombia es Pasión
- 2010–2011: Indeportes Antioquia

Professional teams
- 2012–2018: Team Sky
- 2019–2020: UAE Team Emirates
- 2021: Team Qhubeka Assos
- 2023: Denver Disruptors
- 2024–: Nu Colombia

Major wins
- Grand Tours Giro d'Italia 1 TTT stage (2013) Stage races Paris–Nice (2017) One-day races and Classics National Road Race Championships (2017, 2018)

Sergio Luis Henao Montoya (born 10 December 1987) is a Colombian racing cyclist, who rides for UCI Continental team Nu Colombia. He previously competed for Team Sky, UAE Team Emirates and Team Qhubeka NextHash.

== Early life ==
Henao was born in Rionegro in 1987, the same year that the Colombian rider Luis Herrera won the Vuelta a España.

== Career ==
=== Early years ===
In 2005 Henao won two stages of the Junior Vuelta del Porvenir, and finished second overall behind Rigoberto Urán. He also finished second in the junior Vuelta a Venezuela. Throughout 2006 he picked up numerous general classification podiums and won the Clasic Norte de Santander. For 2007, he joined the Colombia es Pasión team and started to ride outside of his native South America. He recorded 15th overall in the Vuelta a la Comunidad de Madrid, two stages of the Venezuelan Clasico Ciclistico Banfoandes race, and a second overall in the Norte de Sandander followed. Still just 20 years old he then finished third overall at the Vuelta a Antioquia, his home race, and third in the Colombian National Championships time trial for under-23 riders.

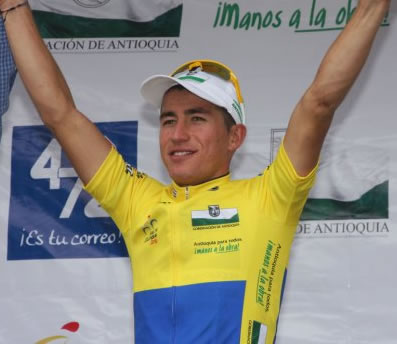
Henao wearing the leader's jersey at the 2010 Vuelta a Colombia

In 2008 he won the under-23 version of the Vuelta a Colombia, picking up two stages along the way; two years later he repeated the feat in the main race, winning two stages and the general classification. In 2011, in one of his last races before moving to Europe, he won the opening prologue of the Tour of Utah, and then extended his lead on the first stage when he was involved in a five-man break with riders including Levi Leipheimer.

=== 2012 ===
In 2012 he made his professional debut, joining compatriot and friend Rigoberto Urán at Team Sky after signing a two-year contract. Henao finished 13th overall in the Vuelta al Pais Vasco in April, and also rode the Ardennes Classics, recording 21st place in Amstel Gold, 14th place in La Flèche Wallonne and 29th in Liège–Bastogne–Liège.

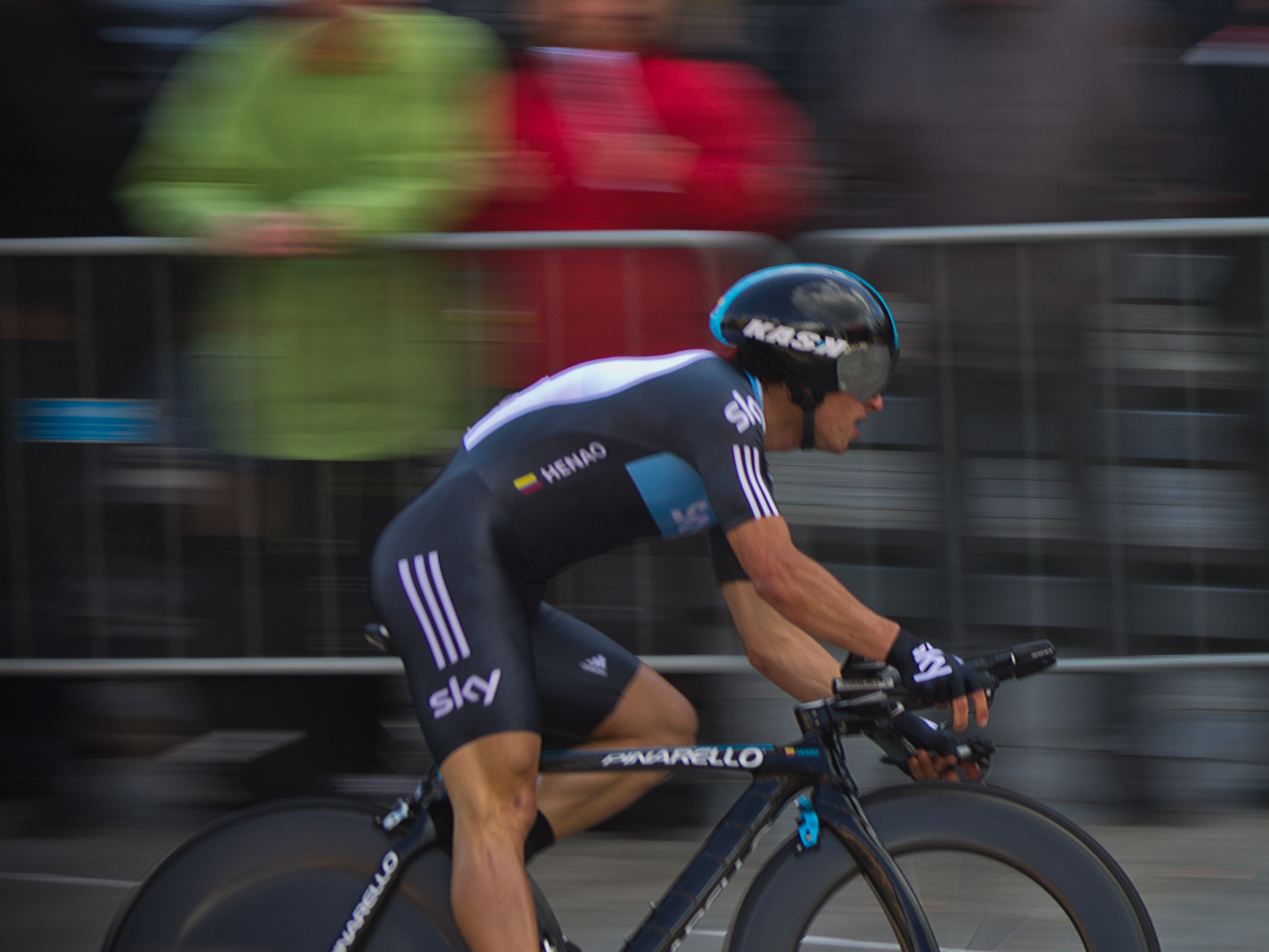
Henao in the opening time trial of the 2012 Giro d'Italia

In May, Henao was selected to be part of Team Sky's Giro d'Italia squad. He performed strongly in his first grand tour, with two top ten stage finishes (4th on Stage 15, 9th on Stage 20), he also wore the White Jersey of the best young rider for two days, taking the jersey over from, and relinquishing it to teammate and eventual classification winner Urán. Henao performed strongly in the final time trial moving up two places on the overall classification to finish ninth, and second in the young rider classification. Following the Giro, Henao rode the Tour de Pologne, where he finished third overall after finishing second on Stage 6. He represented Colombia in the Olympic Road Race and finished 16th. He then went on to finish second overall in the Vuelta a Burgos. Henao also rode then Vuelta a España in support of Chris Froome, and finished 14th overall. He then participated in the UCI Road World Race Championships, finishing ninth in the Road Race. Henao rounded off an impressive season with fifth place in the Giro di Lombardia.

=== 2013 ===
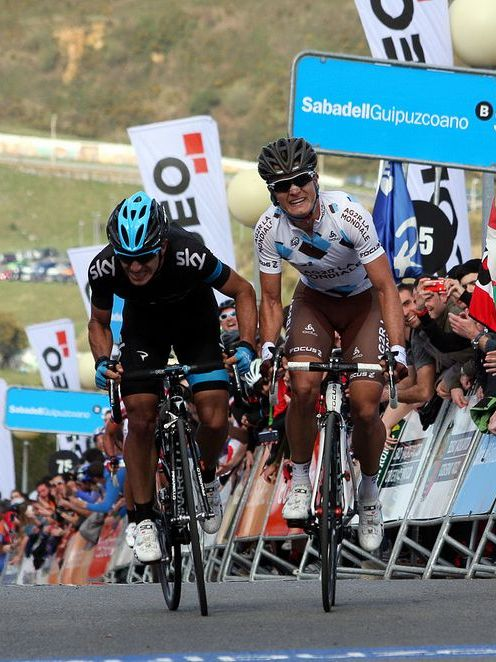
Henao outsprinted Carlos Betancur to win the third stage of the Tour of the Basque Country.

Henao's 2013 season began at the Mallorca Challenge races, where he placed second in the Trofeo Serra de Tramuntana and ninth in the Trofeo Platja de Muro. He then rode the Volta ao Algarve, and won stage 3 to finally take his first victory in Sky colours. Henao also won the third stage of the Tour of the Basque Country. The victory put Henao into the lead of both the general classification and points classification. Henao could not, however, hold his lead through the final time trial stage, but managed to confirm his place on the podium in third place overall, behind fellow Colombian cyclist Nairo Quintana of the Movistar Team, and teammate Richie Porte.

=== 2014 ===
For the 2014 season Henao was joined at Team Sky by his cousin Sebastián Henao.

In March 2014 Team Sky announced that they would remove Henao from the team's race schedule for eight weeks after they raised questions about the results of out-of-competition tests Henao undertook after he returned to Rionegro in October 2013 for the winter. Team Sky principal Dave Brailsford noted that the team's ability to interpret Henao's results was hampered by a lack of research into the physiology of "altitude natives" who grew up in high-altitude environments and that the team would commission independent research to shed light on the situation. Subsequently, in June 2014 the team announced that the research programme, conducted by researchers at the University of Sheffield with the cooperation of Colombian anti-doping agency, had been completed, the findings had been sent to WADA, the UCI and the Colombian Anti-Doping Federation, and that Henao would return to competition at the 2014 Tour de Suisse. However, whilst reconnoitering the time trial course with teammates, Henao was hit by a car, suffering a fractured knee cap and ruling him out for the rest of the 2014 season.

=== 2015 ===
Henao made his comeback at the Settimana Internazionale di Coppi e Bartali, where he helped teammate Ben Swift finish second overall. He then rode the Tour of the Basque Country where he finished second on Stage 3 to take the race lead. He held the lead until the final time trial on Stage 6, where his fourth place was not enough to deny Joaquim Rodríguez overall victory by 13 seconds over Henao.

=== 2016 ===
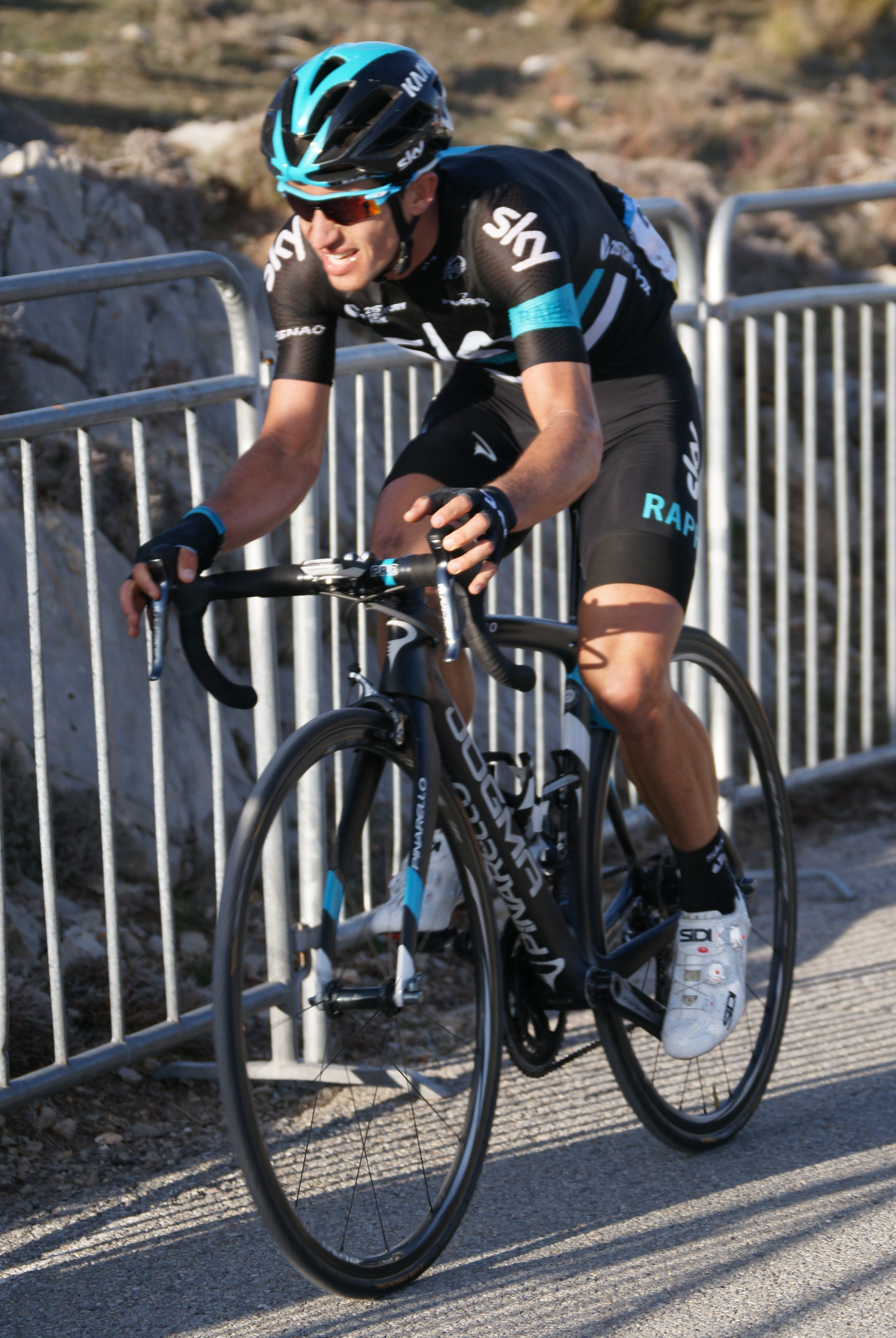
Henao at the 2016 Paris-Nice

Henao started his 2016 season at the Tour Down Under, where he finished third overall and won the mountains classification, going on to finish as runner up in the Colombian National Road Race Championships. His first European race of the year was Paris–Nice in March, where he finished sixth in the general classification and played a crucial role in successfully defending teammate Geraint Thomas' lead on the final stage by closing down several attacks by Alberto Contador. He continued his good form into April, where he was runner up at the GP Miguel Induráin and at the Tour of the Basque Country, where he also topped the points classification.

On 20 April, it was announced that Henao had been withdrawn from racing after the UCI opened a biological passport investigation against him, relating to the same readings as had caused his withdrawal in 2014. Henao himself said that he was "calm and confident that this [would] be resolved soon", while Dave Brailsford stated that "We believe in Sergio." He noted that the UCI's investigation so far had been anonymous and hoped that the UCI investigation would reach the same conclusions as the team had from the 2014 research. He was named in the start list for the Tour de France. Henao was one of Chris Froome's key mountain domestiques as he won the race for the third time.

Henao represented Colombia in the Olympic Road Race. Henao formed part of a six-man attack on the first of three Vista Chinesa Circuit loops, and on the final climb broke clear with Vincenzo Nibali and Rafał Majka. However, Henao and Nibali crashed out of the race on the final descent, suffering a broken collarbone.

=== 2017 ===
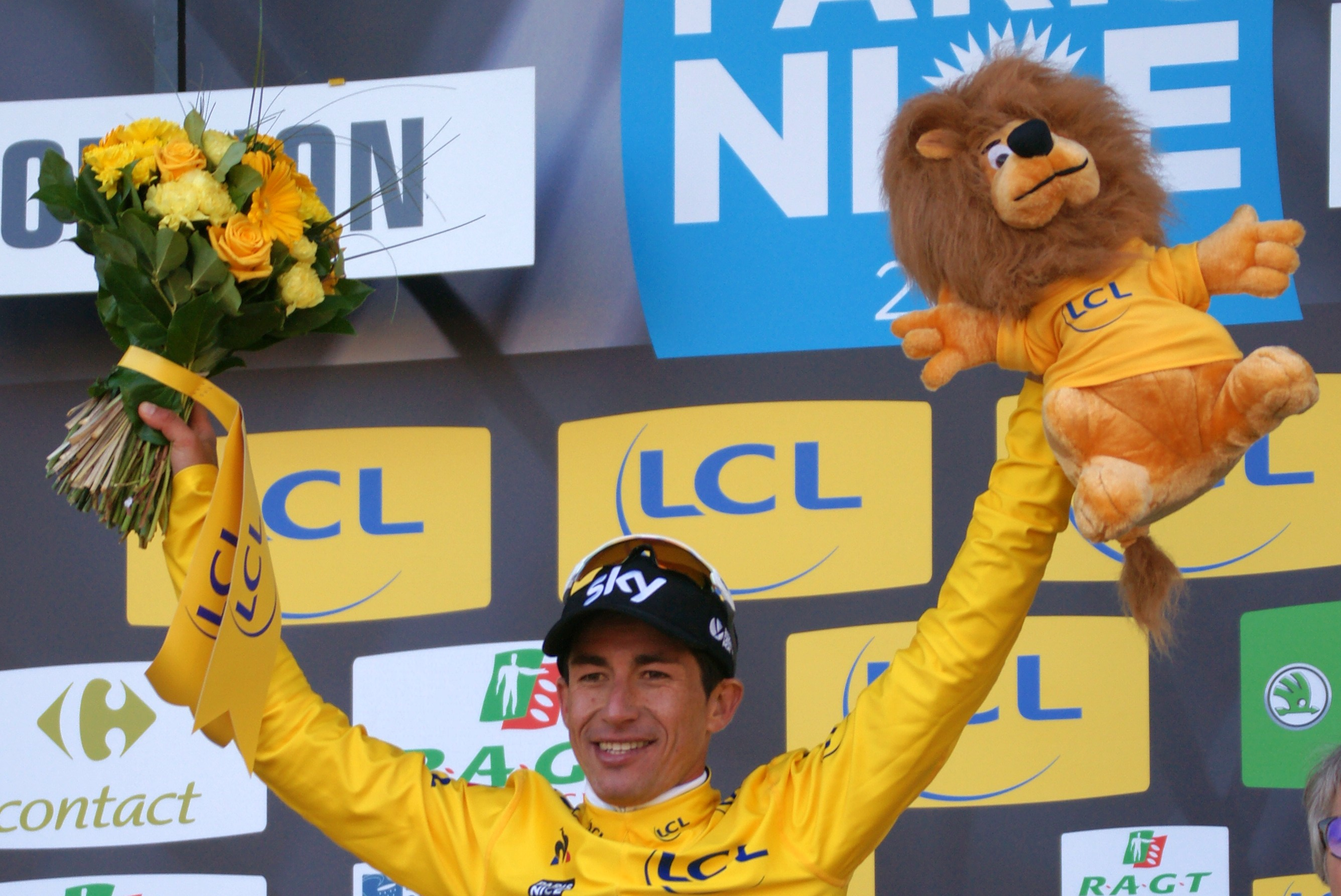
Henao at the 2017 Paris–Nice, a race where he won the general classification by two seconds.

Henao started the year by winning the Colombian National Road Race Championships. In March he won the Paris–Nice race by a gap of two seconds after managing to fend off a final-day attack from Trek–Segafredo's Alberto Contador. Contador had trailed by 31 seconds overnight, but had gone clear with Quick-Step Floors rider David de la Cruz and Marc Soler of the Movistar Team; after taking a couple of seconds at an intermediate sprint, Contador was beaten to the line in Nice by de la Cruz, which cost him four bonus seconds and decided the race in favour of Henao.

== Major results ==
2007
1st Overall Clásico Ciclístico Banfoandes

1st Stages 4 & 6

3rd Time trial, National Under-23 Road Championships
3rd Overall Vuelta a Antioquia

1st Stage 3

2008
1st Overall Vuelta a Colombia Under-23

1st Stages 2 & 5

2009
1st Overall Grand Prix du Portugal

1st Stage 3

1st Overall Cinturón a Mallorca

1st Stage 4

2nd Overall Tour de Beauce
3rd Overall Coupe des nations Ville Saguenay

1st Stage 3

2010
1st Overall Vuelta a Colombia

1st Points classification
1st Stages 1 (TTT), 4 & 10

2nd Overall Clásico RCN

1st Stage 7

2nd Overall Vuelta a Antioguia

1st Prologue (TTT) & Stage 3

5th Overall Vuelta a Guatemala
2011
1st Stage 2 Clásico RCN
2nd Overall Tour of Utah

1st Prologue & Stage 5

2nd Overall Vuelta a Antioquia

1st Stage 2

4th Overall Vuelta a Colombia

1st Stage 2a (TTT)

2012
2nd Overall Vuelta a Burgos
3rd Overall Tour de Pologne
3rd Trofeo Deià
4th Gran Piemonte
5th Giro di Lombardia
9th Road race, UCI Road World Championships
9th Overall Giro d'Italia

Held after Stages 16–17

2013
1st Stage 3 Volta ao Algarve
1st Stage 2 (TTT) Giro d'Italia
2nd La Flèche Wallonne
2nd Trofeo Serra de Tramuntana
3rd Overall Tour of the Basque Country

1st Stage 3

5th Overall Tour de Pologne
6th Amstel Gold Race
9th Trofeo Platja de Muro
2014
7th Overall Tour of Oman
10th Trofeo Serra de Tramuntana
2015
2nd Overall Tour of the Basque Country
3rd Overall Tour of California
7th La Flèche Wallonne
7th Liège–Bastogne–Liège
8th Overall Tour de Pologne

1st Stage 6

9th Giro di Lombardia
2016
2nd Overall Tour of the Basque Country

1st Points classification

2nd Road race, National Road Championships
2nd GP Miguel Induráin
3rd Overall Tour Down Under

1st Mountains classification

6th Overall Paris–Nice
2017
1st Road race, National Road Championships
1st Overall Paris–Nice
3rd GP Miguel Induráin
4th La Flèche Wallonne
6th Amstel Gold Race
8th Overall Tour of the Basque Country
2018
1st Road race, National Road Championships
4th Overall Colombia Oro y Paz
9th Liège–Bastogne–Liège
2019
8th Overall Tour Colombia
Combativity award Stage 7 Vuelta a España
2020
10th Overall Tour Colombia
2021
8th Overall Settimana Internazionale di Coppi e Bartali
2022
4th Overall Joe Martin Stage Race

=== General classification results timeline ===
Grand Tour general classification results
Grand Tour	2012	2013	2014	2015	2016	2017	2018	2019	2020	2021
Giro d'Italia	9	16	—	—	—	—	13	—	—	—
Tour de France	—	—	—	—	12	28	—	47	—	21
Vuelta a España	14	28	—	22	—	—	28	45	15	DNF
Major stage race general classification results
Major stage race	2012	2013	2014	2015	2016	2017	2018	2019	2020	2021
Paris–Nice	—	—	—	—	6	1	12	31	—	19
Tirreno–Adriatico	—	12	—	—	—	—	—	—	22	—
Volta a Catalunya	—	—	—	—	—	—	29	—	NH	—
Tour of the Basque Country	13	3	—	2	2	8	—	14	NH	—
Tour de Romandie	—	—	—	—	—	—	—	—	NH	51
Critérium du Dauphiné	—	—	—	—	13	—	—	—	—	—
Tour de Suisse	—	—	DNF	11	—	—	—	13	NH	—

=== Classics results timeline ===
Monument	2012	2013	2014	2015	2016	2017	2018	2019	2020	2021
Milan–San Remo	Has not contested during his career									
Tour of Flanders	Has not contested during his career									
Paris–Roubaix	Has not contested during his career									
Liège–Bastogne–Liège	29	16	—	7	—	13	9	20	42	77
Giro di Lombardia	5	DNF	—	9	—	73	52	—	—	—
Classic	2012	2013	2014	2015	2016	2017	2018	2019	2020	2021
Amstel Gold Race	21	6	—	33	28	6	18	29	NH	30
La Flèche Wallonne	14	2	—	7	DNS	4	11	20	76	28
Clásica de San Sebastián	20	—	—	—	—	16	—	—	NH	—
Gran Piemonte	4	Not held		—	—	—	—	—	—	—

Legend
—	Did not compete
DNS	Did not start
DNF	Did not finish
DSQ	Disqualified
IP	In progress
NH	Not held
