= Vuelta Ciclista Chiapas =

Race details
- Date: November
- Region: Chiapas, Mexico
- Discipline: Road race
- Competition: UCI America Tour
- Type: Stage race

History
- First edition: 2008
- Editions: 4
- Final edition: 2011
- First winner: Gregorio Ladino (COL)
- Most wins: No repeat winners
- Final winner: Iván Casas (COL)

Vuelta Ciclista Chiapas was a cycling race held annually in Mexico. It was part of the UCI America Tour in category 2.2.

== Winners ==
Year	Country	Rider	Team
2008	Colombia	Gregorio Ladino	
2009	Colombia	Libardo Niño	
2010	Colombia	Mauricio Neisa	
2011	Colombia	Iván Casas	
