= 2015 Vuelta a Colombia =

2015 UCI America Tour
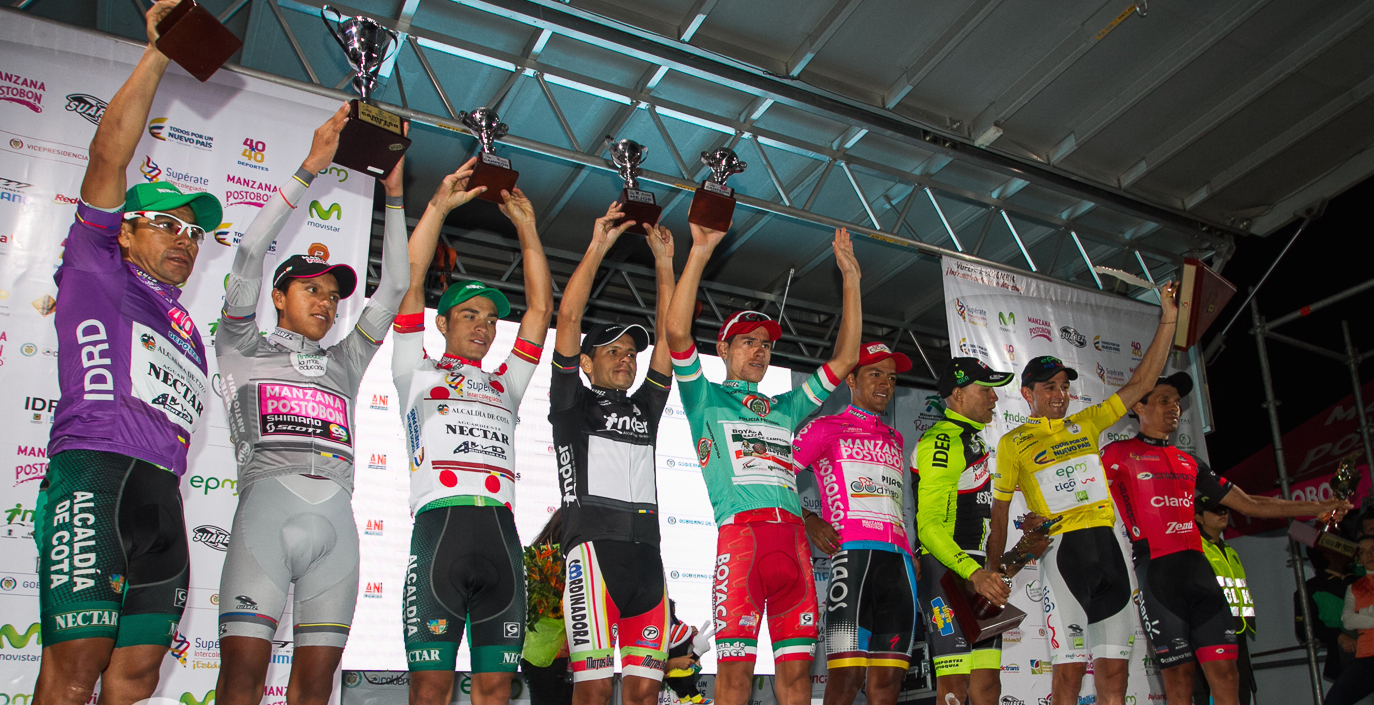

Race details
- Dates: August 2–15, 2015
- Stages: 13
- Winning time: 43h 25' 26"

Results
	Winner	Óscar Sevilla (ESP)
	Second	Mauricio Ortega (COL)
	Third	Luis Felipe Laverde (COL)
	Points	Óscar Sevilla (ESP)
	Mountains	Álvaro Duarte Sandoval (COL)
	Youth	Hernán Aguirre (COL)
	Sprints	Flober Peña (COL)
	Team	Coldeportes–Claro

The 65th edition of the Vuelta a Colombia was held from 2 to 15 August 2015. The race was won by Óscar Sevilla.

== Teams ==
Eighteen teams entered the race. Each team had a maximum of ten riders.

== Route ==
Stage characteristics and winners
Stage	Date	Course	Distance	Type	Stage winner
1	August 2	Bogotá	24.1 km (15.0 mi)	Team time trial	EPM–UNE–Área Metropolitana
2	August 3	Bogotá to Paipa	174.6 km (108.5 mi)	Hilly stage	Wilmer Darío Rodríguez (COL)
3	August 4	Paipa to Cota	172.1 km (106.9 mi)	Hilly stage	José de Jesús Jaimes (COL)
4	August 5	Guaduas to Guaduas	203.8 km (126.6 mi)	Flat stage	Edwin Sánchez (COL)
5	August 6	Mariquita to Ibagué	172.5 km (107.2 mi)	Flat stage	Paul Betancourt (CRC)
6	August 7	Ibagué to Salento	136.6 km (84.9 mi)	Mountain stage	Alejandro Serna (COL)
7	August 8	Armenia to Riosucio	156.7 km (97.4 mi)	Hilly stage	Camilo Gómez (COL)
8	August 9	Viterbo to La Virginia	23.8 km (14.8 mi)	Individual time trial	Rafael Infantino (COL)
	August 10	Rest day			
9	August 11	Cartago to El Tambo	157.1 km (97.6 mi)	Hilly stage	Óscar Sevilla (ESP)
10	August 12	Villamaría to La Pintada	158.6 km (98.5 mi)	Medium mountain stage	Óscar Javier Rivera (COL)
11	August 13	Don Matías to Ituango	146.6 km (91.1 mi)	Hilly stage	Juan Pablo Suárez (COL)
12	August 14	Ituango to Bello	153.1 km (95.1 mi)	Medium mountain stage	Luis Felipe Laverde (COL)
13	August 15	Medellín to Medellín	17.5 km (10.9 mi)	Individual time trial	Óscar Sevilla (ESP)
