= Orgullo Paisa =

Colombian cycling team

Team information
- Registered: Colombia
- Founded: 1993
- Discipline: Road
- Status: UCI Continental
- Bicycles: Giant
- Website: [orgullopaisa.co Team home page]

Key personnel
- Team manager: Alex Cano Ardila

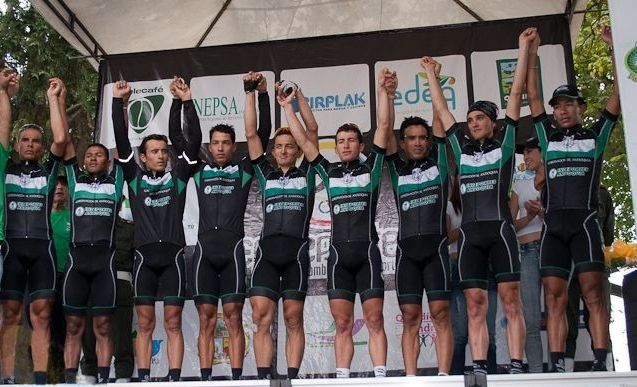
Equipo Continental Orgullo Paisa

Orgullo Paisa is a Colombian UCI Continental cycling team established in 1993, supported by the Antioquia Department government.

== Team roster ==
As of 7 February 2024.

| Rider | Date of birth |
|---|---|
| Juan Manuel Barboza (COL) | 27 September 2000 (age 25) |
| Johan Colón (COL) | 26 August 1995 (age 31) |
| Santiago Escudero (COL) | 5 February 2002 (age 24) |
| Alexander Gil (COL) | 25 September 1992 (age 33) |
| José Tito Hernández (COL) | 8 May 1994 (age 32) |
| Danny Osorio (COL) | 24 June 1988 (age 38) |

| Rider | Date of birth |
|---|---|
| Juan Felipe Osorio (COL) | 30 January 1995 (age 31) |
| Cesar Paulo Pantoja (COL) | 2 January 2003 (age 23) |
| Pablo Paredes (COL) | 15 February 2003 (age 23) |
| Santiago Ramírez (COL) | 8 August 2001 (age 25) |
| Juan Tito Rendón (COL) | 7 April 2000 (age 26) |
| Mateo Sanchez (COL) | 20 December 2001 (age 24) |

== Major wins ==
2011
Stage 2a Vuelta a Colombia, Team time trial
Stage 8 Vuelta a Colombia, Óscar Sevilla
Stage 9 Vuelta a Colombia, Óscar Sevilla
Prologue & Stage 5 Tour of Utah, Sergio Henao
Stage 4 Tour of Utah, Janier Acevedo
2012
Overall Vuelta Mexico Telmex, Julián Rodas

Stage 2, Julián Rodas
Stages 4 & 7 (ITT), Alex Cano

2013
Stages 3, 8 & 14 Vuelta a Colombia, Rafael Infantino
Stage 5 Vuelta a Colombia, Rafael Montiel
Stage 7 Vuelta a Colombia, Mauricio Ortega
2014
Colombia U23 National Time Trial Championships, Carlos Ramirez
Stage 11 Vuelta a Colombia, Jairo Salas
Overall Vuelta a Guatemala, Alex Cano

Stage 1b, Óscar Álvarez
Stages 3 & 4, Alex Cano

2015
Colombia National Road Race Championships, Robinson Chalapud
Stage 1 Tour of the Gila, Rafael Montiel
2016
Colombia National Time Trial Championships, Walter Vargas
Stage 9 Vuelta a Colombia, Jairo Salas
Stage 10 Vuelta a Colombia, Cristian Montoya Giraldo
2022
Stage 1 Vuelta al Táchira, Johan Colon
Stage 4 Vuelta al Táchira, Marco Tulio Suesca

== National champions ==
2013
Colombian U23 Time Trial, Carlos Ramirez
2015
Colombian Road Race, Robinson Chalapud
2016
Colombian Time Trial, Walter Vargas
