= 2013 Vuelta a Colombia =

2012–13 UCI America Tour

Race details
- Dates: 9–23 June 2013
- Stages: 14
- Distance: 2,142 km (1,331 mi)
- Winning time: 51h 36' 18"

Results
Jersey awarded to the overall winner	Winner	Óscar Sevilla (ESP)
	Second	Alex Cano (COL)
	Third	Mauricio Ortega (COL)

The 63rd edition of the Vuelta a Colombia was held from 9 to 23 June 2013. It was won by the Spanish cyclist Óscar Sevilla.
