= Giovanny Báez =

Colombian racing cyclist (born 1981)

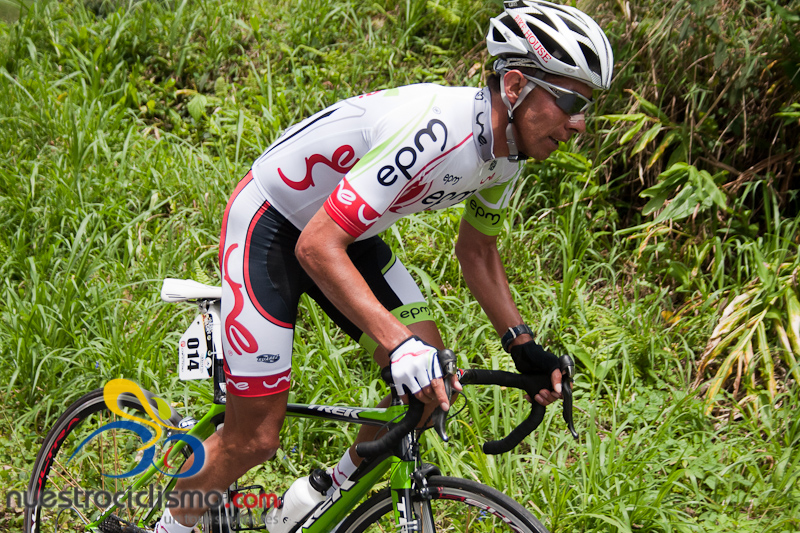

Personal information
- Full name: Giovanny Manuel Báez Álvarez
- Born: 9 April 1981 (age 45) Nobsa, Boyacá, Colombia

Cycling career
- Sport: Cycling
- Current team: Suspended
- Discipline: Road
- Role: Rider
- Rider type: Climber

Amateur teams
- 2003: Lotería de Boyacá
- 2004–2005: Gobernación del Zulia–Alcaldía de Cabimas
- 2005: Viña Magna–Cropusa
- 2008–2009: UNE
- 2014–2015: EBSA–Indeportes Boyacá
- 2016: Union Sportive Lamentinoise

Professional teams
- 2006: Atom
- 2007: UNE–Orbitel
- 2010–2013: EPM–UNE

Major wins
- Vuelta a Colombia (2008)

Giovanny Manuel Báez Álvarez (born 9 April 1981 in Nobsa) is a Colombian professional road racing cyclist, who is currently suspended from the sport after a positive drugs test for a continuous erythropoietin receptor activator.

== Major results ==
2004
1st Stage 11 Vuelta a Venezuela
2005
1st Stage 1 (TTT) Vuelta a León
2009
1st Stage 11 Vuelta a Colombia
2010
1st Stage 5 Tour de Santa Catarina
2011
1st Overall Vuelta a Guatemala

1st Stages 7 & 9

3rd Overall Vuelta a La Rioja
2012
3rd Overall Tour of Qinghai Lake
