= Gregorio Ladino =

Colombian racing cyclist

Personal information
- Full name: Gregorio Ladino Vega
- Nickname: Grego
- Born: January 18, 1973 (age 53) San Mateo, Boyacá, Colombia

Cycling career
- Sport: Cycling
- Discipline: Road
- Role: Rider
- Rider type: Climbing specialist

Amateur team
- 2011: Canel's Turbo

Professional teams
- 1996: Manzana–Postobón
- 2006–2009: Tecos de la Universidad Autónoma de Guadalajara
- 2010: Boyacá Orgullo de América

Major wins
- UCI America Tour (2009), (2010); Vuelta Chihuahua Internacional; Vuelta a Colombia (1 Stage); Vuelta Ciclista a Costa Rica (2001, 1997) (1 Stage); Vuelta a Guatemala (2001); 1995 Vuelta a Colombia (Best Young Rider); Mexican Road Race Championships (2011)
Medal record
Men's road bicycle racing
Representing Colombia
Pan American Championships
Gold medal – first place	2009 Hidalgo	Road race

Gregorio Ladino Vega (born January 18, 1973) is a Colombian former professional road cyclist. Since 2011, he holds a Mexican citizenship.

== Major results ==
1995
1st Young rider classification Vuelta a Colombia
1997
1st Overall Vuelta a Costa Rica
1st Stage 12 Vuelta a Colombia
2001
1st Overall Vuelta a Costa Rica
1st Overall Vuelta a Guatemala
1st Stage 3 Vuelta a Colombia
2002
2nd Overall Vuelta a Costa Rica
2003
1st Overall Vuelta a la Independencia Nacional
1st Stage 9 Vuelta a Chiriquí
1st Stage 4 Vuelta a Costa Rica
2005
2nd Overall Clásico Ciclístico Banfoandes

1st Stage 3

8th Overall Tour of the Gila
2006
1st Overall Vuelta Sonora
1st Overall Vuelta a El Salvador
2nd Overall UCI America Tour
3rd Overall Clásico Ciclístico Banfoandes
6th Overall Vuelta a Chihuahua
7th Overall Vuelta Oaxaca
7th Overall Tour de Beauce
7th Univest Grand Prix
2007
1st Mountains classification Vuelta a Chihuahua
4th Overall Tour de Beauce

1st Mountains classification

6th Overall Doble Sucre Potosí GP Cemento Fancesa
9th Overall Vuelta a El Salvador

1st Stage 5

2008
1st Overall Tour of the Gila

1st Stage 1

1st Overall Vuelta Ciclista Chiapas

1st Stages 1a & 6

1st Stage 8 Vuelta a Cuba
1st Mountains classification Vuelta Mexico Telmex
2nd Overall Vuelta a Chihuahua

1st Stage 2

2nd Overall Doble Sucre Potosí GP Cemento Fancesa

1st Stage 5

2009
1st (gold) Road race, Pan American Cycling Championships
1st Overall Vuelta a Bolivia
2nd Overall Doble Sucre Potosí GP Cemento Fancesa

1st Stages 2 & 5

2010
3rd Overall Vuelta Mexico Telmex
4th Overall Vuelta a Venezuela
5th Overall Vuelta a Bolivia
2011
Mexican National Road Championships

1st Road race
2nd Time trial

8th Overall Vuelta Ciclista Chiapas

1st Mountains classification
1st Stage 3
