= Tour do Rio =

Brazilian multi-day road cycling race

Race details
- Date: Early November
- Region: Brazil
- Discipline: Road
- Competition: UCI America Tour
- Type: Stage race
- Web site: tourdorio.com.br

History
- First edition: 2000
- Editions: 13 (as of 2024)
- First winner: André Grizante (BRA)
- Most wins: Márcio May (BRA); Óscar Sevilla (ESP); (2 wins)
- Most recent: Sergio Henao (COL)

Tour do Rio is a road cycling stage race held in Brazil. The race is classified as a 2.2 event in the UCI America Tour.

== Name of the race ==
- 2000 : Volta do Rio de Janeiro
- 2002 : Giro do Rio
- 2003, 2004, 2007 : Volta do Rio de Janeiro
- 2009 : Volta de Campos
- 2010–2015, 2024– : Tour do Rio

== Past winners ==
Year	Country	Rider	Team
2000	Brazil	André Grizante	
2001	No race		
2002	Brazil	Márcio May	
2003	Colombia	Heberth Gutiérrez	Orbitel 05-Colombia
2004	Brazil	Márcio May	Memorial-Santos
2005–2006	No race		
2007	Argentina	Matías Médici	Scott–Marcondes Cesar–São José dos Campos
2008	No race		
2009	Brazil	Breno Sidoti	Scott–Marcondes Cesar–São José dos Campos
2010	Italy	Tomas Alberio	U.C. Trevigiani–Dynamon–Bottoli
2011	Colombia	Juan Pablo Suárez	EPM–UNE
2012	Brazil	Kleber Silva	Real Cycling Team
2013	Spain	Óscar Sevilla	EPM–UNE
2014	Spain	Óscar Sevilla	EPM–UNE–Área Metropolitana
2015	Spain	Gustavo César	W52–Quinta da Lixa
2016–2023	No race		
2024	Colombia	Sergio Henao	Nu Colombia
