= List of teams and cyclists in the 2017 Vuelta a España =

List of cyclists

The 2017 Vuelta a España is the 72nd edition of the race. It was the last of cycling's three Grand Tours to take place during the 2017 road cycling season. The race started in Nîmes, France on 19 August and finished in Madrid on 10 September. All 18 UCI World Tour teams were automatically entitled to start the race.

== Teams ==
The 18 UCI WorldTeams were automatically invited to participate in the Vuelta. In addition, the race organisers, invited four wildcard teams. These included Caja Rural–Seguros RGA, the only Spanish-registered UCI Professional Continental team. Also invited were the French team Cofidis, Irish team Aqua Blue Sport and Colombian team Team Manzana Postobón.

UCI WorldTeams

- AG2R La Mondiale (riders)
- Astana (riders)
- Bahrain–Merida (riders)
- BMC Racing Team (riders)
- Bora–Hansgrohe (riders)
- Cannondale–Drapac (riders)
- Team Dimension Data (riders)
- FDJ (riders)
- Team Katusha–Alpecin (riders)
- LottoNL–Jumbo (riders)
- Lotto–Soudal (riders)
- Movistar Team (riders)
- Orica–Scott (riders)
- Quick-Step Floors (riders)
- Team Sky (riders)
- Team Sunweb (riders)
- Trek–Segafredo (riders)
- UAE Team Emirates (riders)

UCI Professional Continental teams

- Aqua Blue Sport (riders)
- Caja Rural–Seguros RGA (riders)
- Cofidis (riders)
- Team Manzana Postobón (riders)

== Cyclists ==
Legend
No.	Starting number worn by the rider during the Vuelta
Pos.	Position in the general classification
Time	Deficit to the winner of the general classification
General classification	Denotes the winner of the general classification
Points classification	Denotes the winner of the points classification
Mountains classification	Denotes the winner of the mountains classification
Combination classification	Denotes the winner of the combination classification
DNS	Denotes a rider who did not start, followed by the stage before which he withdrew
DNF	Denotes a rider who did not finish, followed by the stage in which he withdrew
DSQ	Denotes a rider who was disqualified from the race, followed by the stage in which this occurred
Age correct as of 19 August 2017, the date on which the Vuelta begins

=== By starting number ===
The following teams and cyclists took part in the 2017 Vuelta a España:

No.	Name	Nationality	Team	Age	Pos.	Time	Ref.
1	Alberto Contador	Spain	Trek–Segafredo	34	5	+ 3' 18"	
2	Edward Theuns	Belgium	Trek–Segafredo	26	91	+ 3h 33' 03"	
3	Markel Irizar	Spain	Trek–Segafredo	37	119	+ 4h 07' 16"	
4	Julien Bernard	France	Trek–Segafredo	25	85	+ 3h 22' 16"	
5	Jesús Hernández	Spain	Trek–Segafredo	35	64	+ 2h 45' 39"	
6	Jarlinson Pantano	Colombia	Trek–Segafredo	28	33	+ 1h 39' 27"	
7	John Degenkolb	Germany	Trek–Segafredo	28	DNS-5	–	
8	Koen De Kort	Netherlands	Trek–Segafredo	34	77	+ 3h 09' 17"	
9	Peter Stetina	United States	Trek–Segafredo	30	31	+ 1h 36' 35"	
11	David de la Cruz	Spain	Quick-Step Floors	28	DNF-20	–	
12	Julian Alaphilippe	France	Quick-Step Floors	25	68	+ 2h 59' 11"	
13	Eros Capecchi	Italy	Quick-Step Floors	31	104	+ 3h 52' 20"	
14	Tim Declercq	Belgium	Quick-Step Floors	28	129	+ 4h 21' 20"	
15	Bob Jungels	Luxembourg	Quick-Step Floors	24	42	+ 1h 58' 17"	
16	Enric Mas	Spain	Quick-Step Floors	22	71	+ 3h 02' 34"	
17	Yves Lampaert	Belgium	Quick-Step Floors	26	136	+ 4h 32' 02"	
18	Niki Terpstra	Netherlands	Quick-Step Floors	33	130	+ 4h 23' 54"	
19	Matteo Trentin	Italy	Quick-Step Floors	28	84	+ 3h 18' 41"	
21	Chris Froome	Great Britain	Team Sky	32	1	82h 30' 02"	
22	Christian Knees	Germany	Team Sky	36	124	+ 4h 13' 46"	
23	Salvatore Puccio	Italy	Team Sky	27	78	+ 3h 09' 44"	
24	David López	Spain	Team Sky	36	66	+ 2h 58' 17"	
25	Gianni Moscon	Italy	Team Sky	23	27	+ 1h 21' 17"	
26	Mikel Nieve	Spain	Team Sky	33	16	+ 28' 00"	
27	Wout Poels	Netherlands	Team Sky	29	6	+ 6' 59"	
28	Diego Rosa	Italy	Team Sky	28	53	+ 2h 31' 16"	
29	Ian Stannard	Great Britain	Team Sky	30	148	+ 4h 47' 00"	
31	Damiano Caruso	Italy	BMC Racing Team	29	109	+ 3h 54' 23"	
32	Alessandro De Marchi	Italy	BMC Racing Team	31	70	+ 3h 00' 15"	
33	Rohan Dennis	Australia	BMC Racing Team	27	DNS-16	–	
34	Kilian Frankiny	Switzerland	BMC Racing Team	23	DNS-16	–	
35	Daniel Oss	Italy	BMC Racing Team	30	DNS-17	–	
36	Nicolas Roche	Ireland	BMC Racing Team	33	14	+ 22' 00"	
37	Loïc Vliegen	Belgium	BMC Racing Team	23	112	+ 3h 56' 01"	
38	Tejay Van Garderen	United States	BMC Racing Team	29	10	+ 15' 50"	
39	Francisco Ventoso	Spain	BMC Racing Team	35	92	+ 3h 33' 37"	
41	Esteban Chaves	Colombia	Orica–Scott	26	11	+ 16' 46"	
42	Sam Bewley	New Zealand	Orica–Scott	30	143	+ 4h 43' 27"	
43	Jack Haig	Australia	Orica–Scott	23	21	+ 1h 04' 48"	
44	Magnus Cort	Denmark	Orica–Scott	24	126	+ 4h 17' 37"	
45	Christopher Juul-Jensen	Denmark	Orica–Scott	28	107	+ 3h 53' 31"	
46	Svein Tuft	Canada	Orica–Scott	40	DNS-16	–	
47	Carlos Verona	Spain	Orica–Scott	24	73	+ 3h 07' 12"	
48	Adam Yates	Great Britain	Orica–Scott	25	34	+ 1h 39' 51"	
49	Simon Yates	Great Britain	Orica–Scott	25	44	+ 2h 02' 43"	
51	Jorge Arcas	Spain	Movistar Team	25	DNF-12	–	
52	Carlos Betancur	Colombia	Movistar Team	27	DNS-7	–	
53	Richard Carapaz	Ecuador	Movistar Team	24	36	+ 1h 43' 59"	
54	Rubén Fernández	Spain	Movistar Team	26	DNF-15	–	
55	Daniel Moreno	Spain	Movistar Team	35	18	+ 42' 16"	
56	Nélson Oliveira	Portugal	Movistar Team	28	47	+ 2h 16' 03"	
57	Antonio Pedrero	Spain	Movistar Team	25	51	+ 2h 27' 03"	
58	José Joaquín Rojas	Spain	Movistar Team	32	22	+ 1h 05' 02"	
59	Marc Soler	Spain	Movistar Team	23	48	+ 2h 19' 27"	
61	Wilco Kelderman	Netherlands	Team Sunweb	26	4	+ 3' 15"	
62	Warren Barguil	France	Team Sunweb	25	DNS-8	–	
63	Johannes Fröhlinger	Germany	Team Sunweb	32	120	+ 4h 08' 43"	
64	Chad Haga	United States	Team Sunweb	28	98	+ 3h 44' 08"	
65	Chris Hamilton	Australia	Team Sunweb	22	121	+ 4h 12' 42"	
66	Lennard Hofstede	Netherlands	Team Sunweb	22	DNF-12	–	
67	Lennard Kämna	Germany	Team Sunweb	20	DNS-17	–	
68	Søren Kragh Andersen	Denmark	Team Sunweb	23	106	+ 3h 52' 58"	
69	Sam Oomen	Netherlands	Team Sunweb	22	DNF-14	–	
71	Rafał Majka	Poland	Bora–Hansgrohe	27	39	+ 1h 53' 59"	
72	Emanuel Buchmann	Germany	Bora–Hansgrohe	25	65	+ 2h 57' 29"	
73	Michael Kolář	Slovakia	Bora–Hansgrohe	24	DNF-2	–	
74	Cesare Benedetti	Italy	Bora–Hansgrohe	30	DNF-8	–	
75	Patrick Konrad	Austria	Bora–Hansgrohe	25	96	+ 3h 37' 18"	
76	Christoph Pfingsten	Germany	Bora–Hansgrohe	29	142	+ 4h 41' 29"	
77	Paweł Poljański	Poland	Bora–Hansgrohe	27	67	+ 2h 58' 35"	
78	Andreas Schillinger	Germany	Bora–Hansgrohe	34	144	+ 4h 44' 03"	
79	Michael Schwarzmann	Germany	Bora–Hansgrohe	26	154	+ 4h 57' 10"	
81	Romain Bardet	France	AG2R La Mondiale	26	17	+ 31' 21"	
82	Clément Chevrier	France	AG2R La Mondiale	25	61	+ 2h 42' 41"	
83	Nico Denz	Germany	AG2R La Mondiale	23	DNS-16	–	
84	Axel Domont	France	AG2R La Mondiale	27	DNS-14	–	
85	Julien Duval	France	AG2R La Mondiale	27	108	+ 3h 54' 03"	
86	Alexandre Geniez	France	AG2R La Mondiale	29	DNS-16	–	
87	Alexis Gougeard	France	AG2R La Mondiale	24	99	+ 3h 46' 38"	
88	Hugo Houle	Canada	AG2R La Mondiale	26	115	+ 4h 03' 18"	
89	Domenico Pozzovivo	Italy	AG2R La Mondiale	34	DNF-11	–	
91	Michael Woods	Canada	Cannondale–Drapac	30	7	+ 8' 27"	
92	Brendan Canty	Australia	Cannondale–Drapac	25	113	+ 3h 57' 55"	
93	Simon Clarke	Australia	Cannondale–Drapac	31	74	+ 3h 07' 58"	
94	Joe Dombrowski	United States	Cannondale–Drapac	26	101	+ 3h 47' 58"	
95	Thomas Scully	New Zealand	Cannondale–Drapac	27	153	+ 4h 56' 59"	
96	Toms Skujiņš	Latvia	Cannondale–Drapac	26	123	+ 4h 13' 16"	
97	Will Clarke	Australia	Cannondale–Drapac	32	157	+ 5h 03' 10"	
98	Davide Villella	Italy	Cannondale–Drapac	26	97	+ 3h 37' 57"	
99	Tom Van Asbroeck	Belgium	Cannondale–Drapac	27	133	+ 4h 29' 59"	
101	Ilnur Zakarin	Russia	Team Katusha–Alpecin	27	3	+ 2' 51"	
102	Maxim Belkov	Russia	Team Katusha–Alpecin	32	134	+ 4h 30' 01"	
103	Sven Erik Bystrøm	Norway	Team Katusha–Alpecin	25	DNS-8	–	
104	José Gonçalves	Portugal	Team Katusha–Alpecin	28	DNF-6	–	
105	Marco Haller	Austria	Team Katusha–Alpecin	26	118	+ 4h 06' 31"	
106	Alberto Losada	Spain	Team Katusha–Alpecin	35	72	+ 3h 06' 59"	
107	Michael Mørkøv	Denmark	Team Katusha–Alpecin	32	137	+ 4h 33' 01"	
108	Matvey Mamykin	Russia	Team Katusha–Alpecin	22	DNF-19	–	
109	Rein Taaramäe	Estonia	Team Katusha–Alpecin	30	147	+ 4h 46' 21"	
111	Steven Kruijswijk	Netherlands	LottoNL–Jumbo	30	9	+ 11' 18"	
112	George Bennett	New Zealand	LottoNL–Jumbo	27	DNS-12	–	
113	Antwan Tolhoek	Netherlands	LottoNL–Jumbo	23	28	+ 1h 21' 46"	
114	Koen Bouwman	Netherlands	LottoNL–Jumbo	23	41	+ 1h 55' 00"	
115	Stef Clement	Netherlands	LottoNL–Jumbo	34	29	+ 1h 26' 13"	
116	Floris De Tier	Belgium	LottoNL–Jumbo	25	62	+ 2h 44' 41"	
117	Bert-Jan Lindeman	Netherlands	LottoNL–Jumbo	28	110	+ 3h 55' 09"	
118	Juan José Lobato	Spain	LottoNL–Jumbo	28	114	+ 4h 02' 01"	
119	Daan Olivier	Netherlands	LottoNL–Jumbo	24	60	+ 2h 42' 35"	
121	Rui Costa	Portugal	UAE Team Emirates	30	43	+ 1h 58' 46"	
122	Darwin Atapuma	Colombia	UAE Team Emirates	29	20	+ 1h 02' 58"	
123	Anass Ait El Abdia	Morocco	UAE Team Emirates	24	DNF-2	–	
124	Louis Meintjes	South Africa	UAE Team Emirates	25	12	+ 17' 41"	
125	Sacha Modolo	Italy	UAE Team Emirates	30	131	+ 4h 27' 08"	
126	Matej Mohorič	Slovenia	UAE Team Emirates	22	30	+ 1h 31' 24"	
127	Przemysław Niemiec	Poland	UAE Team Emirates	37	86	+ 3h 25' 48"	
128	Jan Polanc	Slovenia	UAE Team Emirates	25	38	+ 1h 52' 14"	
129	Federico Zurlo	Italy	UAE Team Emirates	23	149	+ 4h 47' 04"	
131	Fabio Aru	Italy	Astana	27	13	+ 21' 41"	
132	Pello Bilbao	Spain	Astana	27	23	+ 1h 06' 22"	
133	Sergey Chernetskiy	Russia	Astana	27	94	+ 3h 35' 00"	
134	Laurens De Vreese	Belgium	Astana	28	122	+ 4h 12' 46"	
135	Jesper Hansen	Denmark	Astana	26	DNF-8	–	
136	Miguel Ángel López	Colombia	Astana	23	8	+ 9' 13"	
137	Alexey Lutsenko	Kazakhstan	Astana	24	75	+ 3h 08' 08"	
138	Luis León Sánchez	Spain	Astana	33	32	+ 1h 36' 50"	
139	Nikita Stalnov	Kazakhstan	Astana	25	145	+ 4h 44' 07"	
141	Sander Armée	Belgium	Lotto–Soudal	31	19	+ 59' 01"	
142	Bart De Clercq	Belgium	Lotto–Soudal	30	40	+ 1h 54' 19"	
143	Thomas De Gendt	Belgium	Lotto–Soudal	30	57	+ 2h 39' 53"	
144	Jens Debusschere	Belgium	Lotto–Soudal	27	DNF-9	–	
145	Tomasz Marczyński	Poland	Lotto–Soudal	33	55	+ 2h 34' 33"	
146	Remy Mertz	Belgium	Lotto–Soudal	22	150	+ 4h 49' 50"	
147	Maxime Monfort	Belgium	Lotto–Soudal	34	DNS-18	–	
148	Jelle Wallays	Belgium	Lotto–Soudal	28	151	+ 4h 53' 38"	
149	Adam Hansen	Australia	Lotto–Soudal	36	95	+ 3h 37' 11"	
151	Vincenzo Nibali	Italy	Bahrain–Merida	32	2	+ 2' 15"	
152	Valerio Agnoli	Italy	Bahrain–Merida	32	79	+ 3h 09' 53"	
153	Manuele Boaro	Italy	Bahrain–Merida	30	116	+ 4h 03' 24"	
154	Iván García	Spain	Bahrain–Merida	21	100	+ 3h 47' 27"	
155	Javier Moreno	Spain	Bahrain–Merida	33	DNF-2	–	
156	Antonio Nibali	Italy	Bahrain–Merida	24	102	+ 3h 50' 02"	
157	Domen Novak	Slovenia	Bahrain–Merida	22	105	+ 3h 52' 56"	
158	Franco Pellizotti	Italy	Bahrain–Merida	39	25	+ 1h 13' 36"	
159	Giovanni Visconti	Italy	Bahrain–Merida	34	46	+ 2h 11' 10"	
161	Arnaud Courteille	France	FDJ	28	103	+ 3h 50' 13"	
162	Marc Fournier	France	FDJ	22	DNF-3	–	
163	Daniel Hoelgaard	Norway	FDJ	24	125	+ 4h 17' 04"	
164	Johan Le Bon	France	FDJ	26	DNF-9	–	
165	Tobias Ludvigsson	Sweden	FDJ	26	59	+ 2h 42' 20"	
166	Jérémy Maison	France	FDJ	24	63	+ 2h 45' 01"	
167	Lorenzo Manzin	France	FDJ	23	156	+ 5h 01' 29"	
168	Anthony Roux	France	FDJ	30	52	+ 2h 28' 01"	
169	Odd Christian Eiking	Norway	FDJ	22	DNS-21	–	
171	Igor Antón	Spain	Team Dimension Data	34	35	+ 1h 42' 33"	
172	Nick Dougall	South Africa	Team Dimension Data	24	DNF-6	–	
173	Youcef Reguigui	Algeria	Team Dimension Data	27	DNF-5	–	
174	Omar Fraile	Spain	Team Dimension Data	27	DNF-13	–	
175	Jacques Janse Van Rensburg	South Africa	Team Dimension Data	29	82	+ 3h 18' 23"	
176	Benjamin King	United States	Team Dimension Data	28	DNS-3	–	
177	Merhawi Kudus	Eritrea	Team Dimension Data	23	DNF-7	–	
178	Lachlan Morton	Australia	Team Dimension Data	25	90	+ 3h 32' 57"	
179	Serge Pauwels	Belgium	Team Dimension Data	33	DNS-12	–	
181	Guillaume Bonnafond	France	Cofidis	30	88	+ 3h 28' 17"	
182	Luis Ángel Maté	Spain	Cofidis	33	24	+ 1h 13' 27"	
183	Daniel Navarro	Spain	Cofidis	34	81	+ 3h 17' 49"	
184	Anthony Perez	France	Cofidis	26	80	+ 3h 13' 46"	
185	Stéphane Rossetto	France	Cofidis	30	54	+ 2h 33' 53"	
186	Anthony Turgis	France	Cofidis	23	117	+ 4h 06' 21"	
187	Jimmy Turgis	France	Cofidis	26	DNF-15	–	
188	Jonas Van Genechten	Belgium	Cofidis	30	DNF-7	–	
189	Kenneth Vanbilsen	Belgium	Cofidis	27	146	+ 4h 44' 33"	
191	Sergio Pardilla	Spain	Caja Rural–Seguros RGA	33	15	+ 22' 59"	
192	David Arroyo	Spain	Caja Rural–Seguros RGA	37	89	+ 3h 32' 34"	
193	Fabricio Ferrari	Uruguay	Caja Rural–Seguros RGA	32	56	+ 2h 39' 52"	
194	Lluis Mas	Spain	Caja Rural–Seguros RGA	27	83	+ 3h 18' 29"	
195	Rafael Reis	Portugal	Caja Rural–Seguros RGA	25	132	+ 4h 27' 14"	
196	Jaime Rosón	Spain	Caja Rural–Seguros RGA	24	26	+ 1h 17' 12"	
197	Diego Rubio	Spain	Caja Rural–Seguros RGA	26	127	+ 4h 19' 46"	
198	Héctor Saez	Spain	Caja Rural–Seguros RGA	23	76	+ 3h 09' 06"	
199	Nick Schultz	Australia	Caja Rural–Seguros RGA	22	111	+ 3h 55' 40"	
201	Adam Blythe	Great Britain	Aqua Blue Sport	27	155	+ 4h 58' 28"	
202	Mark Christian	Great Britain	Aqua Blue Sport	26	138	+ 4h 36' 26"	
203	Stefan Denifl	Austria	Aqua Blue Sport	29	58	+ 2h 41' 15"	
204	Aaron Gate	New Zealand	Aqua Blue Sport	26	140	+ 4h 40' 07"	
205	Lasse Norman Hansen	Denmark	Aqua Blue Sport	25	139	+ 4h 38' 56"	
206	Michel Kreder	Netherlands	Aqua Blue Sport	30	128	+ 4h 21' 18"	
207	Larry Warbasse	United States	Aqua Blue Sport	27	DNF-7	–	
208	Peter Koning	Netherlands	Aqua Blue Sport	26	141	+ 4h 41' 00"	
209	Conor Dunne	Ireland	Aqua Blue Sport	25	158	+ 5h 16' 23"	
211	Aldemar Reyes	Colombia	Team Manzana Postobón	22	45	+ 2h 03' 25"	
212	Hernán Aguirre	Colombia	Team Manzana Postobón	21	37	+ 1h 49' 26"	
213	Hernando Bohórquez	Colombia	Team Manzana Postobón	25	93	+ 3h 33' 54"	
214	Fernando Orjuela	Colombia	Team Manzana Postobón	25	135	+ 4h 31' 44"	
215	Juan Felipe Osorio	Colombia	Team Manzana Postobón	22	87	+ 3h 27' 41"	
216	Juan Sebastián Molano	Colombia	Team Manzana Postobón	22	152	+ 4h 54' 27"	
217	Bernardo Suaza	Colombia	Team Manzana Postobón	24	49	+ 2h 23' 21"	
218	Ricardo Vilela	Portugal	Team Manzana Postobón	29	50	+ 2h 25' 21"	
219	Jetse Bol	Netherlands	Team Manzana Postobón	27	69	+ 2h 59' 17"	

=== By team ===
Trek–Segafredo (TFS)
No.	Rider	Pos.
1	Alberto Contador (ESP)	5
2	Edward Theuns (BEL)	91
3	Markel Irizar (ESP)	119
4	Julien Bernard (FRA)	85
5	Jesús Hernández (ESP)	64
6	Jarlinson Pantano (COL)	33
7	John Degenkolb (GER)	DNS-5
8	Koen De Kort (NED)	77
9	Peter Stetina (USA)	31
Directeur sportif: Steven De Jongh/Dirk Demol

Quick-Step Floors (QST)
No.	Rider	Pos.
11	David de la Cruz (ESP)	DNF-20
12	Julian Alaphilippe (FRA)	68
13	Eros Capecchi (ITA)	104
14	Tim Declercq (BEL)	129
15	Bob Jungels (LUX)	42
16	Enric Mas (ESP)	71
17	Yves Lampaert (BEL)	136
18	Niki Terpstra (NED)	130
19	Matteo Trentin (ITA)	84
Directeur sportif: Rik Van Slycke/Geert Van Bondt

Team Sky (SKY)
No.	Rider	Pos.
21	Chris Froome (GBR)	1
22	Christian Knees (GER)	124
23	Salvatore Puccio (ITA)	78
24	David López (ESP)	66
25	Gianni Moscon (ITA)	27
26	Mikel Nieve (ESP)	16
27	Wout Poels (NED)	6
28	Diego Rosa (ITA)	53
29	Ian Stannard (GBR)	148
Directeur sportif: Nicolas Portal/Gabriel Rasch

BMC Racing Team (BMC)
No.	Rider	Pos.
31	Damiano Caruso (ITA)	109
32	Alessandro de Marchi (ITA)	70
33	Rohan Dennis (AUS)	DNS-16
34	Kilian Frankiny (SUI)	DNS-16
35	Daniel Oss (ITA)	DNS-17
36	Nicolas Roche (IRL)	14
37	Loïc Vliegen (BEL)	112
38	Tejay Van Garderen (USA)	10
39	Francisco Ventoso (ESP)	92
Directeur sportif: Yvon Ledanois/Maximilian Sciandri

Orica–Scott (ORS)
No.	Rider	Pos.
41	Esteban Chaves (COL)	11
42	Sam Bewley (NZL)	143
43	Jack Haig (AUS)	21
44	Magnus Cort (DEN)	126
45	Christopher Juul-Jensen (DEN)	107
46	Svein Tuft (CAN)	DNS-16
47	Carlos Verona (ESP)	73
48	Adam Yates (GBR)	34
49	Simon Yates (GBR)	44
Directeur sportif: Neil Stephens/David McPartland

Movistar Team (MOV)
No.	Rider	Pos.
51	Jorge Arcas (ESP)	DNF-12
52	Carlos Betancur (COL)	DNS-7
53	Richard Carapaz (ECU)	36
54	Rubén Fernández (ESP)	DNF-15
55	Daniel Moreno (ESP)	18
56	Nélson Oliveira (POR)	47
57	Antonio Pedrero (ESP)	51
58	José Joaquín Rojas (ESP)	22
59	Marc Soler (ESP)	48
Directeur sportif: José Luis Arrieta/José Vicente García

Team Sunweb (SUN)
No.	Rider	Pos.
61	Wilco Kelderman (NED)	4
62	Warren Barguil (FRA)	DNS-8
63	Johannes Fröhlinger (GER)	120
64	Chad Haga (USA)	98
65	Chris Hamilton (AUS)	121
66	Lennard Hofstede (NED)	DNF-12
67	Lennard Kämna (GER)	DNS-17
68	Søren Kragh Andersen (DEN)	106
69	Sam Oomen (NED)	DNF-14
Directeur sportif: Marc Reef/Arthur van Dongen

Bora–Hansgrohe (BOH)
No.	Rider	Pos.
71	Rafał Majka (POL)	39
72	Emanuel Buchmann (GER)	65
73	Michael Kolář (SVK)	DNF-2
74	Cesare Benedetti (ITA)	DNF-8
75	Patrick Konrad (AUT)	96
76	Christoph Pfingsten (GER)	142
77	Paweł Poljański (POL)	67
78	Andreas Schillinger (GER)	144
79	Michael Schwarzmann (GER)	154
Directeur sportif: Steffen Radochla/André Schulze

AG2R La Mondiale (ALM)
No.	Rider	Pos.
81	Romain Bardet (FRA)	17
82	Clément Chevrier (FRA)	61
83	Nico Denz (GER)	DNS-16
84	Axel Domont (FRA)	DNS-14
85	Julien Duval (FRA)	108
86	Alexandre Geniez (FRA)	DNS-16
87	Alexis Gougeard (FRA)	99
88	Hugo Houle (CAN)	115
89	Domenico Pozzovivo (ITA)	DNF-11
Directeur sportif: Julien Jurdie/Didier Jannel

Cannondale–Drapac (CDT)
No.	Rider	Pos.
91	Michael Woods (CAN)	7
92	Brendan Canty (AUS)	113
93	Simon Clarke (AUS)	74
94	Joe Dombrowski (USA)	101
95	Thomas Scully (NZL)	153
96	Toms Skujiņš (LAT)	123
97	Will Clarke (AUS)	157
98	Davide Villella (ITA)	97
99	Tom Van Asbroeck (BEL)	133
Directeur sportif: Juan Manuel Gárate/Tom Southam

Team Katusha–Alpecin (KAT)
No.	Rider	Pos.
101	Ilnur Zakarin (RUS)	3
102	Maxim Belkov (RUS)	134
103	Sven Erik Bystrøm (NOR)	DNS-8
104	José Gonçalves (POR)	DNF-6
105	Marco Haller (AUT)	118
106	Alberto Losada (ESP)	72
107	Michael Mørkøv (DEN)	137
108	Matvey Mamykin (RUS)	DNF-19
109	Rein Taaramäe (EST)	147
Directeur sportif: Dmitri Konyshev/Xavier Florencio

LottoNL–Jumbo (TLJ)
No.	Rider	Pos.
111	Steven Kruijswijk (NED)	9
112	George Bennett (NZL)	DNS-12
113	Antwan Tolhoek (NED)	28
114	Koen Bouwman (NED)	41
115	Stef Clement (NED)	29
116	Floris De Tier (BEL)	62
117	Bert-Jan Lindeman (NED)	110
118	Juan José Lobato (ESP)	114
119	Daan Olivier (NED)	60
Directeur sportif: Grischa Niermann

UAE Team Emirates (UAD)
No.	Rider	Pos.
121	Rui Costa (POR)	43
122	Darwin Atapuma (COL)	20
123	Anass Ait El Abdia (MAR)	DNF-2
124	Louis Meintjes (RSA)	12
125	Sacha Modolo (ITA)	131
126	Matej Mohorič (SLO)	30
127	Przemysław Niemiec (POL)	86
128	Jan Polanc (SLO)	38
129	Federico Zurlo (ITA)	149
Directeur sportif: Simone Pedrazzini/Bruno Vicino

Astana (AST)
No.	Rider	Pos.
131	Fabio Aru (ITA)	13
132	Pello Bilbao (ESP)	23
133	Sergey Chernetskiy (RUS)	94
134	Laurens De Vreese (BEL)	122
135	Jesper Hansen (DEN)	DNF-8
136	Miguel Ángel López (COL)	8
137	Alexey Lutsenko (KAZ)	75
138	Luis León Sánchez (ESP)	32
139	Nikita Stalnov (KAZ)	145
Directeur sportif: Alexander Shefer/Dmitri Sedoun

Lotto–Soudal (LTS)
No.	Rider	Pos.
141	Sander Armée (BEL)	19
142	Bart De Clercq (BEL)	40
143	Thomas De Gendt (BEL)	57
144	Jens Debusschere (BEL)	DNF-9
145	Tomasz Marczyński (POL)	55
146	Remy Mertz (BEL)	150
147	Maxime Monfort (BEL)	DNS-18
148	Jelle Wallays (BEL)	151
149	Adam Hansen (AUS)	95
Directeur sportif: Mario Aerts/Marc Wauters

Bahrain–Merida (TBM)
No.	Rider	Pos.
151	Vincenzo Nibali (ITA)	2
152	Valerio Agnoli (ITA)	79
153	Manuele Boaro (ITA)	116
154	Iván García (ESP)	100
155	Javier Moreno (ESP)	DNF-2
156	Antonio Nibali (ITA)	102
157	Domen Novak (SLO)	105
158	Franco Pellizotti (ITA)	25
159	Giovanni Visconti (ITA)	46
Directeur sportif: Alberto Volpi/Gorazd Štangelj

FDJ (FDJ)
No.	Rider	Pos.
161	Arnaud Courteille (FRA)	103
162	Marc Fournier (FRA)	DNF-3
163	Daniel Hoelgaard (NOR)	125
164	Johan Le Bon (FRA)	DNF-9
165	Tobias Ludvigsson (SWE)	59
166	Jérémy Maison (FRA)	63
167	Lorenzo Manzin (FRA)	156
168	Anthony Roux (FRA)	52
169	Odd Christian Eiking (NOR)	DNS-21
Directeur sportif: Thierry Bricaud/Franck Pineau

Team Dimension Data (DDD)
No.	Rider	Pos.
171	Igor Antón (ESP)	35
172	Nick Dougall (RSA)	DNF-6
173	Youcef Reguigui (ALG)	DNF-5
174	Omar Fraile (ESP)	DNF-13
175	Jacques Janse Van Rensburg (RSA)	82
176	Benjamin King (USA)	DNS-3
177	Merhawi Kudus (ERI)	DNF-7
178	Lachlan Morton (AUS)	90
179	Serge Pauwels (BEL)	DNS-12
Directeur sportif: Alex Sans Vega/Bingen Fernández

Cofidis (COF)
No.	Rider	Pos.
181	Guillaume Bonnafond (FRA)	88
182	Luis Ángel Maté (ESP)	24
183	Daniel Navarro (ESP)	81
184	Anthony Perez (FRA)	80
185	Stéphane Rossetto (FRA)	54
186	Anthony Turgis (FRA)	117
187	Jimmy Turgis (FRA)	DNF-15
188	Jonas Van Genechten (BEL)	DNF-7
189	Kenneth Vanbilsen (BEL)	146
Directeur sportif: Christian Guiberteau/Jean-Luc Jonrond

Caja Rural–Seguros RGA (CJR)
No.	Rider	Pos.
191	Sergio Pardilla (ESP)	15
192	David Arroyo (ESP)	89
193	Fabricio Ferrari (URU)	56
194	Lluis Mas (ESP)	83
195	Rafael Reis (POR)	132
196	Jaime Rosón (ESP)	26
197	Diego Rubio (ESP)	127
198	Héctor Saez (ESP)	76
199	Nick Schultz (AUS)	111
Directeur sportif: Eugenio Goikoetxea/Jose Miguel Fernandez

Aqua Blue Sport (ABS)
No.	Rider	Pos.
201	Adam Blythe (GBR)	155
202	Mark Christian (GBR)	138
203	Stefan Denifl (AUT)	58
204	Aaron Gate (NZL)	140
205	Lasse Norman Hansen (DEN)	139
206	Michel Kreder (NED)	128
207	Larry Warbasse (USA)	DNF-7
208	Peter Koning (NED)	141
209	Conor Dunne (IRL)	158
Directeur sportif: Nicki Sörensen/Tim Barry

Team Manzana Postobón (MZN)
No.	Rider	Pos.
211	Aldemar Reyes (COL)	45
212	Hernán Aguirre (COL)	37
213	Hernando Bohórquez (COL)	93
214	Fernando Orjuela (COL)	135
215	Juan Felipe Osorio (COL)	87
216	Juan Sebastián Molano (COL)	152
217	Bernardo Suaza (COL)	49
218	Ricardo Vilela (POR)	50
219	Jetse Bol (NED)	69
Directeur sportif: Luis Fernando Saldarriaga/Oscar de Jesús Vargas

=== By nationality ===
The 198 riders that are competing in the 2017 Vuelta a España originated from 33 different countries.

Country	No. of riders	Finishers	Stage wins
Algeria	1	0	
Australia	9	8	
Austria	3	3	1 (Stefan Denifl)
Belgium	17	13	3 (Yves Lampaert, Sander Armée, Thomas De Gendt)
Canada	3	2	
Colombia	12	11	2 (Miguel Ángel López x2)
Denmark	6	5	
Ecuador	1	1	
Eritrea	1	0	
Estonia	1	1	
France	20	14	1 (Julian Alaphilippe)
Germany	9	6	
Great Britain	6	6	2 (Chris Froome x2)
Ireland	2	2	
Italy	20	17	5 (Vincenzo Nibali, Matteo Trentin x4)
Kazakhstan	2	2	1 (Alexey Lutsenko)
Latvia	1	1	
Luxembourg	1	1	
Morocco	1	0	
Netherlands	15	13	
New Zealand	4	3	
Norway	3	1	
Poland	4	4	3 (Tomasz Marczyński x2, Rafał Majka)
Portugal	5	4	
Russia	4	3	
Slovakia	1	0	
Slovenia	3	3	1 (Matej Mohorič)
South Africa	3	2	
Spain	31	26	1 (Alberto Contador)
Sweden	1	1	
Switzerland	1	0	
United States	6	4	
Uruguay	1	1	
Total	198	158	20
