= 2017 Vuelta a España, Stage 1 to Stage 11 =

Long-distance bicycle race stages

The 2017 Vuelta a España began on 19 August, with Stage 21 scheduled for 10 September. The 2017 edition of the cycle race began with the only team time trial stage of the race.

== Classification standings ==
Legend (Note: Jerseys appearing in the table on the left of the page indicate those worn by the cyclist during the particular stage, while those appearing in the table on the right of the page indicate those awarded to the cyclist after the stage.)
| Red jersey | Denotes the leader of the general classification | Green jersey | Denotes the leader of the points classification |
| Blue polka dot jersey | Denotes the leader of the mountains classification | White jersey | Denotes the leader of the combination rider classification |

== Stage 1 ==
19 August 2017 — Nîmes, 13.7 km (8.5 mi), team time trial (TTT)

Result of Stage 1
| Rank | Team | Time |
|---|---|---|
| 1 | BMC Racing Team | 15' 58" |
| 2 | Quick-Step Floors | + 6" |
| 3 | Team Sunweb | + 6" |
| 4 | Team Sky | + 9" |
| 5 | Orica–Scott | + 17" |
| 6 | Bora–Hansgrohe | + 21" |
| 7 | Lotto–Soudal | + 24" |
| 8 | Movistar Team | + 24" |
| 9 | Bahrain–Merida | + 31" |
| 10 | Team Katusha–Alpecin | + 33" |

General classification after Stage 1
| Rank | Rider | Team | Time |
|---|---|---|---|
| 1 | Rohan Dennis (AUS) | BMC Racing Team | 23' 21" |
| 2 | Daniel Oss (ITA) | BMC Racing Team | + 0" |
| 3 | Nicolas Roche (IRL) | BMC Racing Team | + 0" |
| 4 | Alessandro De Marchi (ITA) | BMC Racing Team | + 0" |
| 5 | Damiano Caruso (ITA) | BMC Racing Team | + 0" |
| 6 | Tejay van Garderen (USA) | BMC Racing Team | + 0" |
| 7 | Yves Lampaert (BEL) | Quick-Step Floors | + 6" |
| 8 | David de la Cruz (ESP) | Quick-Step Floors | + 6" |
| 9 | Bob Jungels (LUX) | Quick-Step Floors | + 6" |
| 10 | Julian Alaphilippe (FRA) | Quick-Step Floors | + 6" |

== Stage 2 ==
20 August 2017 — Nîmes – Gruissan, 203.4 km (126.4 mi)

Stage 2 result
| Rank | Rider | Team | Time |
|---|---|---|---|
| 1 | Yves Lampaert (BEL) | Quick-Step Floors | 4h 36' 13" |
| 2 | Matteo Trentin (ITA) | Quick-Step Floors | + 0" |
| 3 | Adam Blythe (GBR) | Aqua Blue Sport | + 0" |
| 4 | Edward Theuns (BEL) | Trek–Segafredo | + 0" |
| 5 | Sacha Modolo (ITA) | UAE Team Emirates | + 0" |
| 6 | Michael Schwarzmann (GER) | Bora–Hansgrohe | + 0" |
| 7 | Tom Van Asbroeck (BEL) | Cannondale–Drapac | + 0" |
| 8 | Daniel Oss (ITA) | BMC Racing Team | + 0" |
| 9 | Patrick Konrad (AUT) | Bora–Hansgrohe | + 0" |
| 10 | Vincenzo Nibali (ITA) | Bahrain–Merida | + 0" |

General classification after Stage 2
| Rank | Rider | Team | Time |
|---|---|---|---|
| 1 | Yves Lampaert (BEL) | Quick-Step Floors | 4h 52' 17" |
| 2 | Matteo Trentin (ITA) | Quick-Step Floors | + 1" |
| 3 | Daniel Oss (ITA) | BMC Racing Team | + 3" |
| 4 | Tejay van Garderen (USA) | BMC Racing Team | + 17" |
| 5 | Nicolas Roche (IRL) | BMC Racing Team | + 17" |
| 6 | Rohan Dennis (AUS) | BMC Racing Team | + 17" |
| 7 | Julian Alaphilippe (FRA) | Quick-Step Floors | + 18" |
| 8 | Wilco Kelderman (NED) | Team Sunweb | + 18" |
| 9 | Chris Froome (GBR) | Team Sky | + 21" |
| 10 | Wout Poels (NED) | Team Sky | + 21" |

== Stage 3 ==
21 August 2017 — Prades Conflent Canigó – Andorra, 158.5 km (98.5 mi)

Stage 3 result
| Rank | Rider | Team | Time |
|---|---|---|---|
| 1 | Vincenzo Nibali (ITA) | Bahrain–Merida | 4h 01' 22" |
| 2 | David de la Cruz (ESP) | Quick-Step Floors | + 0" |
| 3 | Chris Froome (GBR) | Team Sky | + 0" |
| 4 | Romain Bardet (FRA) | AG2R La Mondiale | + 0" |
| 5 | Esteban Chaves (COL) | Orica–Scott | + 0" |
| 6 | Fabio Aru (ITA) | Astana | + 0" |
| 7 | Nicolas Roche (IRL) | BMC Racing Team | + 0" |
| 8 | Tejay van Garderen (USA) | BMC Racing Team | + 0" |
| 9 | Domenico Pozzovivo (ITA) | AG2R La Mondiale | + 0" |
| 10 | Michael Woods (CAN) | Cannondale–Drapac | + 25" |

General classification after Stage 3
| Rank | Rider | Team | Time |
|---|---|---|---|
| 1 | Chris Froome (GBR) | Team Sky | 8h 53' 44" |
| 2 | David de la Cruz (ESP) | Quick-Step Floors | + 2" |
| 3 | Nicolas Roche (IRL) | BMC Racing Team | + 2" |
| 4 | Tejay van Garderen (USA) | BMC Racing Team | + 2" |
| 5 | Vincenzo Nibali (ITA) | Bahrain–Merida | + 10" |
| 6 | Esteban Chaves (COL) | Orica–Scott | + 11" |
| 7 | Fabio Aru (ITA) | Astana | + 38" |
| 8 | Adam Yates (GBR) | Orica–Scott | + 39" |
| 9 | Domenico Pozzovivo (ITA) | AG2R La Mondiale | + 43" |
| 10 | Romain Bardet (FRA) | AG2R La Mondiale | + 48" |

== Stage 4 ==
22 August 2017 — Escaldes-Engordany – Tarragona, 198.2 km (123.2 mi)

Stage 4 result
| Rank | Rider | Team | Time |
|---|---|---|---|
| 1 | Matteo Trentin (ITA) | Quick-Step Floors | 4h 43' 57" |
| 2 | Juan José Lobato (ESP) | LottoNL–Jumbo | + 0" |
| 3 | Tom Van Asbroeck (BEL) | Cannondale–Drapac | + 0" |
| 4 | Edward Theuns (BEL) | Trek–Segafredo | + 0" |
| 5 | Jens Debusschere (BEL) | Lotto–Soudal | + 0" |
| 6 | Sacha Modolo (ITA) | UAE Team Emirates | + 0" |
| 7 | Lorenzo Manzin (FRA) | FDJ | + 0" |
| 8 | Søren Kragh Andersen (DEN) | Team Sunweb | + 0" |
| 9 | Youcef Reguigui (ALG) | Team Dimension Data | + 0" |
| 10 | Jetse Bol (NED) | Team Manzana Postobón | + 0" |

General classification after Stage 4
| Rank | Rider | Team | Time |
|---|---|---|---|
| 1 | Chris Froome (GBR) | Team Sky | 13h 37' 41" |
| 2 | David de la Cruz (ESP) | Quick-Step Floors | + 2" |
| 3 | Nicolas Roche (IRL) | BMC Racing Team | + 2" |
| 4 | Tejay van Garderen (USA) | BMC Racing Team | + 2" |
| 5 | Vincenzo Nibali (ITA) | Bahrain–Merida | + 10" |
| 6 | Esteban Chaves (COL) | Orica–Scott | + 11" |
| 7 | Fabio Aru (ITA) | Astana | + 38" |
| 8 | Adam Yates (GBR) | Orica–Scott | + 39" |
| 9 | Romain Bardet (FRA) | AG2R La Mondiale | + 48" |
| 10 | Simon Yates (GBR) | Orica–Scott | + 48" |

== Stage 5 ==
23 August 2017 — Benicàssim – Alcossebre, 175.7 km (109.2 mi)

Stage 5 result
| Rank | Rider | Team | Time |
|---|---|---|---|
| 1 | Alexey Lutsenko (KAZ) | Astana | 4h 24' 58" |
| 2 | Merhawi Kudus (ERI) | Team Dimension Data | + 42" |
| 3 | Marc Soler (ESP) | Movistar Team | + 56" |
| 4 | Matej Mohorič (SLO) | UAE Team Emirates | + 1' 11" |
| 5 | Alexis Gougeard (FRA) | AG2R La Mondiale | + 1' 24" |
| 6 | Marco Haller (AUT) | Team Katusha–Alpecin | + 1' 37" |
| 7 | Julian Alaphilippe (FRA) | Quick-Step Floors | + 1' 40" |
| 8 | Jetse Bol (NED) | Team Manzana Postobón | + 2' 04" |
| 9 | Matvey Mamykin (RUS) | Team Katusha–Alpecin | + 2' 18" |
| 10 | Jérémy Maison (FRA) | FDJ | + 2' 31" |

General classification after Stage 5
| Rank | Rider | Team | Time |
|---|---|---|---|
| 1 | Chris Froome (GBR) | Team Sky | 18h 07' 10" |
| 2 | Tejay van Garderen (USA) | BMC Racing Team | + 10" |
| 3 | Esteban Chaves (COL) | Orica–Scott | + 11" |
| 4 | Nicolas Roche (IRL) | BMC Racing Team | + 13" |
| 5 | David de la Cruz (ESP) | Quick-Step Floors | + 23" |
| 6 | Vincenzo Nibali (ITA) | Bahrain–Merida | + 36" |
| 7 | Fabio Aru (ITA) | Astana | + 49" |
| 8 | Adam Yates (GBR) | Orica–Scott | + 50" |
| 9 | Simon Yates (GBR) | Orica–Scott | + 1' 09" |
| 10 | Michael Woods (CAN) | Cannondale–Drapac | + 1' 13" |

== Stage 6 ==
24 August 2017 — Villarreal – Sagunto, 204.4 km (127.0 mi)

Stage 6 result
| Rank | Rider | Team | Time |
|---|---|---|---|
| 1 | Tomasz Marczyński (POL) | Lotto–Soudal | 4h 47' 02" |
| 2 | Paweł Poljański (POL) | Bora–Hansgrohe | + 0" |
| 3 | Enric Mas (ESP) | Quick-Step Floors | + 0" |
| 4 | Luis León Sánchez (ESP) | Astana | + 8" |
| 5 | Jan Polanc (SLO) | UAE Team Emirates | + 8" |
| 6 | Warren Barguil (FRA) | Team Sunweb | + 26" |
| 7 | Giovanni Visconti (ITA) | Bahrain–Merida | + 26" |
| 8 | Chris Froome (GBR) | Team Sky | + 26" |
| 9 | Fabio Aru (ITA) | Astana | + 26" |
| 10 | Jack Haig (AUS) | Orica–Scott | + 26" |

General classification after Stage 6
| Rank | Rider | Team | Time |
|---|---|---|---|
| 1 | Chris Froome (GBR) | Team Sky | 22h 54' 38" |
| 2 | Esteban Chaves (COL) | Orica–Scott | + 11" |
| 3 | Nicolas Roche (IRL) | BMC Racing Team | + 13" |
| 4 | Tejay van Garderen (USA) | BMC Racing Team | + 30" |
| 5 | Vincenzo Nibali (ITA) | Bahrain–Merida | + 36" |
| 6 | David de la Cruz (ESP) | Quick-Step Floors | + 40" |
| 7 | Fabio Aru (ITA) | Astana | + 49" |
| 8 | Adam Yates (GBR) | Orica–Scott | + 50" |
| 9 | Michael Woods (CAN) | Cannondale–Drapac | + 1' 13" |
| 10 | Simon Yates (GBR) | Orica–Scott | + 1' 26" |

== Stage 7 ==
25 August 2017 — Llíria – Cuenca, 207 km (128.6 mi)

Stage 7 result
| Rank | Rider | Team | Time |
|---|---|---|---|
| 1 | Matej Mohorič (SLO) | UAE Team Emirates | 4h 43' 35" |
| 2 | Paweł Poljański (POL) | Bora–Hansgrohe | + 16" |
| 3 | José Joaquín Rojas (ESP) | Movistar Team | + 16" |
| 4 | Thomas De Gendt (BEL) | Lotto–Soudal | + 16" |
| 5 | Alessandro De Marchi (ITA) | BMC Racing Team | + 27" |
| 6 | Floris De Tier (BEL) | LottoNL–Jumbo | + 27" |
| 7 | Jetse Bol (NED) | Team Manzana Postobón | + 27" |
| 8 | Luis Ángel Maté (ESP) | Cofidis | + 1' 21" |
| 9 | Anthony Perez (FRA) | Cofidis | + 1' 32" |
| 10 | Arnaud Courteille (FRA) | FDJ | + 1' 32" |

General classification after Stage 7
| Rank | Rider | Team | Time |
|---|---|---|---|
| 1 | Chris Froome (GBR) | Team Sky | 27h 46' 51" |
| 2 | Esteban Chaves (COL) | Orica–Scott | + 11" |
| 3 | Nicolas Roche (IRL) | BMC Racing Team | + 13" |
| 4 | Tejay van Garderen (USA) | BMC Racing Team | + 30" |
| 5 | Vincenzo Nibali (ITA) | Bahrain–Merida | + 36" |
| 6 | David de la Cruz (ESP) | Quick-Step Floors | + 40" |
| 7 | Jetse Bol (NED) | Team Manzana Postobón | + 46" |
| 8 | Fabio Aru (ITA) | Astana | + 49" |
| 9 | Adam Yates (GBR) | Orica–Scott | + 50" |
| 10 | Michael Woods (CAN) | Cannondale–Drapac | + 1' 13" |

== Stage 8 ==
26 August 2017 — Hellín – Xorret de Catí, 199.5 km (124.0 mi)

Stage 8 result
| Rank | Rider | Team | Time |
|---|---|---|---|
| 1 | Julian Alaphilippe (FRA) | Quick-Step Floors | 4h 37' 55" |
| 2 | Jan Polanc (SLO) | UAE Team Emirates | + 2" |
| 3 | Rafał Majka (POL) | Bora–Hansgrohe | + 2" |
| 4 | Serge Pauwels (BEL) | Team Dimension Data | + 26" |
| 5 | Nelson Oliveira (POR) | Movistar Team | + 28" |
| 6 | Michel Kreder (NED) | Aqua Blue Sport | + 32" |
| 7 | Maxime Monfort (BEL) | Lotto–Soudal | + 32" |
| 8 | Bart De Clercq (BEL) | Lotto–Soudal | + 34" |
| 9 | Alberto Losada (ESP) | Team Katusha–Alpecin | + 37" |
| 10 | Emanuel Buchmann (GER) | Bora–Hansgrohe | + 1' 04" |

General classification after Stage 8
| Rank | Rider | Team | Time |
|---|---|---|---|
| 1 | Chris Froome (GBR) | Team Sky | 32h 26' 13" |
| 2 | Esteban Chaves (COL) | Orica–Scott | + 28" |
| 3 | Nicolas Roche (IRL) | BMC Racing Team | + 41" |
| 4 | Vincenzo Nibali (ITA) | Bahrain–Merida | + 53" |
| 5 | Tejay van Garderen (USA) | BMC Racing Team | + 58" |
| 6 | Fabio Aru (ITA) | Astana | + 1' 06" |
| 7 | David de la Cruz (ESP) | Quick-Step Floors | + 1' 08" |
| 8 | Adam Yates (GBR) | Orica–Scott | + 1' 18" |
| 9 | Michael Woods (CAN) | Cannondale–Drapac | + 1' 41" |
| 10 | Ilnur Zakarin (RUS) | Team Katusha–Alpecin | + 1' 57" |

== Stage 9 ==
27 August 2017 — Orihuela – Cumbre del Sol, El Poble Nou de Benitatxell, 174 km (108.1 mi)

Stage 9 result
| Rank | Rider | Team | Time |
|---|---|---|---|
| 1 | Chris Froome (GBR) | Team Sky | 4h 07' 13" |
| 2 | Esteban Chaves (COL) | Orica–Scott | + 4" |
| 3 | Michael Woods (CAN) | Cannondale–Drapac | + 5" |
| 4 | Wilco Kelderman (NED) | Team Sunweb | + 8" |
| 5 | Ilnur Zakarin (RUS) | Team Katusha–Alpecin | + 8" |
| 6 | Alberto Contador (ESP) | Trek–Segafredo | + 12" |
| 7 | David de la Cruz (ESP) | Quick-Step Floors | + 12" |
| 8 | Sam Oomen (NED) | Team Sunweb | + 12" |
| 9 | Nicolas Roche (IRL) | BMC Racing Team | + 14" |
| 10 | Vincenzo Nibali (ITA) | Bahrain–Merida | + 14" |

General classification after Stage 9
| Rank | Rider | Team | Time |
|---|---|---|---|
| 1 | Chris Froome (GBR) | Team Sky | 36h 33' 16" |
| 2 | Esteban Chaves (COL) | Orica–Scott | + 36" |
| 3 | Nicolas Roche (IRL) | BMC Racing Team | + 1' 05" |
| 4 | Vincenzo Nibali (ITA) | Bahrain–Merida | + 1' 17" |
| 5 | Tejay van Garderen (USA) | BMC Racing Team | + 1' 27" |
| 6 | David de la Cruz (ESP) | Quick-Step Floors | + 1' 30" |
| 7 | Fabio Aru (ITA) | Astana | + 1' 33" |
| 8 | Michael Woods (CAN) | Cannondale–Drapac | + 1' 52" |
| 9 | Adam Yates (GBR) | Orica–Scott | + 1' 55" |
| 10 | Ilnur Zakarin (RUS) | Team Katusha–Alpecin | + 2' 15" |

== Rest day ==
28 August 2017 — Province of Alicante

== Stage 10 ==
29 August 2017 — Caravaca de la Cruz – ElPozo Alimentación, Alhama de Murcia, 164.8 km (102.4 mi)

Stage 10 result
| Rank | Rider | Team | Time |
|---|---|---|---|
| 1 | Matteo Trentin (ITA) | Quick-Step Floors | 3h 34' 56" |
| 2 | José Joaquín Rojas (ESP) | Movistar Team | + 1" |
| 3 | Jaime Rosón (ESP) | Caja Rural–Seguros RGA | + 19" |
| 4 | Jacques Janse Van Rensburg (RSA) | Team Dimension Data | + 21" |
| 5 | Alexandre Geniez (FRA) | AG2R La Mondiale | + 56" |
| 6 | Marc Soler (ESP) | Movistar Team | + 59" |
| 7 | Luis León Sánchez (ESP) | Astana | + 2' 22" |
| 8 | Alessandro De Marchi (ITA) | BMC Racing Team | + 2' 22" |
| 9 | Arnaud Courteille (FRA) | FDJ | + 2' 40" |
| 10 | Rafael Reis (POR) | Caja Rural–Seguros RGA | + 3' 05" |

General classification after Stage 10
| Rank | Rider | Team | Time |
|---|---|---|---|
| 1 | Chris Froome (GBR) | Team Sky | 40h 12' 44" |
| 2 | Esteban Chaves (COL) | Orica–Scott | + 36" |
| 3 | Nicolas Roche (IRL) | BMC Racing Team | + 36" |
| 4 | Vincenzo Nibali (ITA) | Bahrain–Merida | + 1' 17" |
| 5 | Tejay van Garderen (USA) | BMC Racing Team | + 1' 27" |
| 6 | David de la Cruz (ESP) | Quick-Step Floors | + 1' 30" |
| 7 | Fabio Aru (ITA) | Astana | + 1' 33" |
| 8 | Michael Woods (CAN) | Cannondale–Drapac | + 1' 52" |
| 9 | Adam Yates (GBR) | Orica–Scott | + 1' 55" |
| 10 | Ilnur Zakarin (RUS) | Team Katusha–Alpecin | + 2' 15" |

== Stage 11 ==
30 August 2017 — Lorca – Calar Alto, 187.5 km (116.5 mi)

Stage 11 result
| Rank | Rider | Team | Time |
|---|---|---|---|
| 1 | Miguel Ángel López (COL) | Astana | 5h 05' 09" |
| 2 | Chris Froome (GBR) | Team Sky | + 14" |
| 3 | Vincenzo Nibali (ITA) | Bahrain–Merida | + 14" |
| 4 | Wilco Kelderman (NED) | Team Sunweb | + 14" |
| 5 | Romain Bardet (FRA) | AG2R La Mondiale | + 31" |
| 6 | Alberto Contador (ESP) | Trek–Segafredo | + 31" |
| 7 | Ilnur Zakarin (RUS) | Team Katusha–Alpecin | + 31" |
| 8 | Mikel Nieve (ESP) | Team Sky | + 31" |
| 9 | Darwin Atapuma (COL) | UAE Team Emirates | + 1' 02" |
| 10 | David de la Cruz (ESP) | Quick-Step Floors | + 1' 14" |

General classification after Stage 11
| Rank | Rider | Team | Time |
|---|---|---|---|
| 1 | Chris Froome (GBR) | Team Sky | 45h 18' 01" |
| 2 | Vincenzo Nibali (ITA) | Bahrain–Merida | + 1' 19" |
| 3 | Esteban Chaves (COL) | Orica–Scott | + 2' 33" |
| 4 | David de la Cruz (ESP) | Quick-Step Floors | + 2' 36" |
| 5 | Wilco Kelderman (NED) | Team Sunweb | + 2' 37" |
| 6 | Ilnur Zakarin (RUS) | Team Katusha–Alpecin | + 2' 38" |
| 7 | Fabio Aru (ITA) | Astana | + 2' 57" |
| 8 | Michael Woods (CAN) | Cannondale–Drapac | + 3' 01" |
| 9 | Alberto Contador (ESP) | Trek–Segafredo | + 3' 55" |
| 10 | Miguel Ángel López (COL) | Astana | + 4' 11" |
