= 2017 Vuelta a España, Stage 12 to Stage 21 =

Long-distance bicycle race stages

The 2017 Vuelta a España began on 19 August, with Stage 21 scheduled for 10 September. The 2017 edition of the cycle race began with the only team time trial stage of the race.

== Classification standings ==
Legend (Note: Jerseys appearing in the table on the left of the page indicate those worn by the cyclist during the particular stage, while those appearing in the table on the right of the page indicate those awarded to the cyclist after the stage.)
Red jersey	Denotes the leader of the general classification	Green jersey	Denotes the leader of the points classification
Blue polka dot jersey	Denotes the leader of the mountains classification	White jersey	Denotes the leader of the combination rider classification

== Stage 12 ==
31 August 2017 — Motril – Antequera, 160.1 km (99.5 mi)

Stage 12 result
Rank	Rider	Team	Time
1	Tomasz Marczyński (POL)	Lotto–Soudal	3h 56' 45"
2	Omar Fraile (ESP)	Team Dimension Data	+ 52"
3	José Joaquín Rojas (ESP)	Movistar Team	+ 52"
4	Paweł Poljański (POL)	Bora–Hansgrohe	+ 52"
5	Stef Clement (NED)	LottoNL–Jumbo	+ 52"
6	Brendan Canty (AUS)	Cannondale–Drapac	+ 1' 42"
7	Anthony Perez (FRA)	Cofidis	+ 2' 50"
8	Jan Polanc (SVN)	UAE Team Emirates	+ 2' 50"
9	Andreas Schillinger (GER)	Bora–Hansgrohe	+ 2' 50"
10	David Arroyo (ESP)	Caja Rural–Seguros RGA	+ 3' 00"

General classification after Stage 12
Rank	Rider	Team	Time
1	Chris Froome (GBR)	Team Sky	49h 22' 53"
2	Vincenzo Nibali (ITA)	Bahrain–Merida	+ 59"
3	Esteban Chaves (COL)	Orica–Scott	+ 2' 13"
4	David de la Cruz (ESP)	Quick-Step Floors	+ 2' 16"
5	Wilco Kelderman (NED)	Team Sunweb	+ 2' 17"
6	Ilnur Zakarin (RUS)	Team Katusha–Alpecin	+ 2' 18"
7	Fabio Aru (ITA)	Astana	+ 2' 37"
8	Michael Woods (CAN)	Cannondale–Drapac	+ 2' 41"
9	Alberto Contador (ESP)	Trek–Segafredo	+ 3' 13"
10	Miguel Ángel López (COL)	Astana	+ 3' 51"

== Stage 13 ==
1 September 2017 — Coín – Tomares, 198.4 km (123.3 mi)

Stage 13 result
Rank	Rider	Team	Time
1	Matteo Trentin (ITA)	Quick-Step Floors	4h 25' 13"
2	Gianni Moscon (ITA)	Team Sky	+ 0"
3	Søren Kragh Andersen (DEN)	Team Sunweb	+ 0"
4	Michael Schwarzmann (GER)	Bora–Hansgrohe	+ 0"
5	Tom Van Asbroeck (BEL)	Cannondale–Drapac	+ 0"
6	Vincenzo Nibali (ITA)	Bahrain–Merida	+ 0"
7	Chris Froome (GBR)	Team Sky	+ 0"
8	Wilco Kelderman (NED)	Team Sunweb	+ 0"
9	Alberto Contador (ESP)	Trek–Segafredo	+ 0"
10	Nicolas Roche (IRL)	BMC Racing Team	+ 0"

General classification after Stage 13
Rank	Rider	Team	Time
1	Chris Froome (GBR)	Team Sky	53h 48' 07"
2	Vincenzo Nibali (ITA)	Bahrain–Merida	+ 59"
3	Esteban Chaves (COL)	Orica–Scott	+ 2' 13"
4	Wilco Kelderman (NED)	Team Sunweb	+ 2' 17"
5	David de la Cruz (ESP)	Quick-Step Floors	+ 2' 23"
6	Ilnur Zakarin (RUS)	Team Katusha–Alpecin	+ 2' 25"
7	Fabio Aru (ITA)	Astana	+ 2' 37"
8	Michael Woods (CAN)	Cannondale–Drapac	+ 2' 41"
9	Alberto Contador (ESP)	Trek–Segafredo	+ 3' 13"
10	Miguel Ángel López (COL)	Astana	+ 3' 58"

== Stage 14 ==
2 September 2017 — Écija – Sierra de La Pandera, 175 km (108.7 mi)

Stage 14 result
Rank	Rider	Team	Time
1	Rafał Majka (POL)	Bora–Hansgrohe	4h 42' 10"
2	Miguel Ángel López (COL)	Astana	+ 27"
3	Vincenzo Nibali (ITA)	Bahrain–Merida	+ 31"
4	Chris Froome (GBR)	Team Sky	+ 31"
5	Ilnur Zakarin (RUS)	Team Katusha–Alpecin	+ 31"
6	Wilco Kelderman (NED)	Team Sunweb	+ 31"
7	Alberto Contador (ESP)	Trek–Segafredo	+ 37"
8	Wout Poels (NED)	Team Sky	+ 46"
9	Esteban Chaves (COL)	Orica–Scott	+ 57"
10	Fabio Aru (ITA)	Astana	+ 1' 03"

General classification after Stage 14
Rank	Rider	Team	Time
1	Chris Froome (GBR)	Team Sky	58h 30' 47"
2	Vincenzo Nibali (ITA)	Bahrain–Merida	+ 55"
3	Wilco Kelderman (NED)	Team Sunweb	+ 2' 17"
4	Ilnur Zakarin (RUS)	Team Katusha–Alpecin	+ 2' 25"
5	Esteban Chaves (COL)	Orica–Scott	+ 2' 39"
6	Fabio Aru (ITA)	Astana	+ 3' 09"
7	David de la Cruz (ESP)	Quick-Step Floors	+ 3' 11"
8	Alberto Contador (ESP)	Trek–Segafredo	+ 3' 19"
9	Michael Woods (CAN)	Cannondale–Drapac	+ 3' 23"
10	Miguel Ángel López (COL)	Astana	+ 3' 48"

== Stage 15 ==
3 September 2017 — Alcalá la Real – Alto Hoya de la Mora, Sierra Nevada, 129.4 km (80.4 mi)

Stage 15 result
Rank	Rider	Team	Time
1	Miguel Ángel López (COL)	Astana	3h 34' 51"
2	Ilnur Zakarin (RUS)	Team Katusha–Alpecin	+ 36"
3	Wilco Kelderman (NED)	Team Sunweb	+ 45"
4	Esteban Chaves (COL)	Orica–Scott	+ 47"
5	Chris Froome (GBR)	Team Sky	+ 47"
6	Michael Woods (CAN)	Cannondale–Drapac	+ 50"
7	Vincenzo Nibali (ITA)	Bahrain–Merida	+ 53"
8	Wout Poels (NED)	Team Sky	+ 53"
9	Louis Meintjes (RSA)	UAE Team Emirates	+ 53"
10	Pello Bilbao (ESP)	Astana	+ 1' 02"

General classification after Stage 15
Rank	Rider	Team	Time
1	Chris Froome (GBR)	Team Sky	62h 06' 25"
2	Vincenzo Nibali (ITA)	Bahrain–Merida	+ 1' 01"
3	Ilnur Zakarin (RUS)	Team Katusha–Alpecin	+ 2' 08"
4	Wilco Kelderman (NED)	Team Sunweb	+ 2' 11"
5	Esteban Chaves (COL)	Orica–Scott	+ 2' 39"
6	Miguel Ángel López (COL)	Astana	+ 2' 51"
7	Fabio Aru (ITA)	Astana	+ 3' 24"
8	Michael Woods (CAN)	Cannondale–Drapac	+ 3' 26"
9	Alberto Contador (ESP)	Trek–Segafredo	+ 3' 59"
10	Wout Poels (NED)	Team Sky	+ 5' 22"

== Rest day ==
4 September 2017 — Logroño

== Stage 16 ==
5 September 2017 — Circuito de Navarra – Logroño, 40.2 km (25.0 mi), individual time trial (ITT)

Stage 16 result
Rank	Rider	Team	Time
1	Chris Froome (GBR)	Team Sky	47' 00"
2	Wilco Kelderman (NED)	Team Sunweb	+ 29"
3	Vincenzo Nibali (ITA)	Bahrain–Merida	+ 57"
4	Ilnur Zakarin (RUS)	Team Katusha–Alpecin	+ 59"
5	Alberto Contador (ESP)	Trek–Segafredo	+ 59"
6	Tobias Ludvigsson (SWE)	FDJ	+ 1' 07"
7	Wout Poels (NED)	Team Sky	+ 1' 11"
8	Lennard Kämna (GER)	Team Sunweb	+ 1' 30"
9	Daniel Oss (ITA)	BMC Racing Team	+ 1' 49"
10	Alexis Gougeard (FRA)	AG2R La Mondiale	+ 1' 55"

General classification after Stage 16
Rank	Rider	Team	Time
1	Chris Froome (GBR)	Team Sky	62h 53' 25"
2	Vincenzo Nibali (ITA)	Bahrain–Merida	+ 1' 58"
3	Wilco Kelderman (NED)	Team Sunweb	+ 2' 40"
4	Ilnur Zakarin (RUS)	Team Katusha–Alpecin	+ 3' 07"
5	Alberto Contador (ESP)	Trek–Segafredo	+ 4' 58"
6	Miguel Ángel López (COL)	Astana	+ 5' 25"
7	Fabio Aru (ITA)	Astana	+ 6' 27"
8	Wout Poels (NED)	Team Sky	+ 6' 33"
9	Esteban Chaves (COL)	Orica–Scott	+ 6' 40"
10	Michael Woods (CAN)	Cannondale–Drapac	+ 7' 06"

== Stage 17 ==
6 September 2017 — Villadiego – Los Machucos, Monumento Vaca Pasiega, 180.5 km (112.2 mi)

Stage 17 result
Rank	Rider	Team	Time
DSQ	~~Stefan Denifl~~ (AUT)	~~Aqua Blue Sport~~	~~4h 48' 52"~~
2	Alberto Contador (ESP)	Trek–Segafredo	+ 28"
3	Miguel Ángel López (COL)	Astana	+ 1' 04"
4	Vincenzo Nibali (ITA)	Bahrain–Merida	+ 1' 04"
5	Ilnur Zakarin (RUS)	Team Katusha–Alpecin	+ 1' 04"
6	Rafał Majka (POL)	Bora–Hansgrohe	+ 1' 04"
7	Michael Woods (CAN)	Cannondale–Drapac	+ 1' 13"
8	Daniel Moreno (ESP)	Movistar Team	+ 1' 17"
9	Wilco Kelderman (NED)	Team Sunweb	+ 1' 19"
10	David de la Cruz (ESP)	Quick-Step Floors	+ 1' 42"

General classification after Stage 17
Rank	Rider	Team	Time
1	Chris Froome (GBR)	Team Sky	67h 44' 03"
2	Vincenzo Nibali (ITA)	Bahrain–Merida	+ 1' 16"
3	Wilco Kelderman (NED)	Team Sunweb	+ 2' 13"
4	Ilnur Zakarin (RUS)	Team Katusha–Alpecin	+ 2' 25"
5	Alberto Contador (ESP)	Trek–Segafredo	+ 3' 34"
6	Miguel Ángel López (COL)	Astana	+ 4' 39"
7	Michael Woods (CAN)	Cannondale–Drapac	+ 6' 33"
8	Wout Poels (NED)	Team Sky	+ 6' 40"
9	Fabio Aru (ITA)	Astana	+ 6' 45"
10	David de la Cruz (ESP)	Quick-Step Floors	+ 10' 10"

== Stage 18 ==
7 September 2017 — Suances – Santo Toribio de Liébana, 169 km (105.0 mi)

Stage 18 result
Rank	Rider	Team	Time
1	Sander Armée (BEL)	Lotto–Soudal	4h 09' 39"
2	Alexey Lutsenko (KAZ)	Astana	+ 31"
3	Giovanni Visconti (ITA)	Bahrain–Merida	+ 46"
4	Alexis Gougeard (FRA)	AG2R La Mondiale	+ 1' 02"
5	José Joaquín Rojas (ESP)	Movistar Team	+ 1' 06"
6	Alessandro De Marchi (ITA)	BMC Racing Team	+ 1' 19"
7	Matteo Trentin (ITA)	Quick-Step Floors	+ 1' 21"
8	Sergio Pardilla (ESP)	Caja Rural–Seguros RGA	+ 1' 21"
9	Antwan Tolhoek (NED)	LottoNL–Jumbo	+ 1' 38"
10	Anthony Roux (FRA)	FDJ	+ 1' 42"

General classification after Stage 18
Rank	Rider	Team	Time
1	Chris Froome (GBR)	Team Sky	72h 03' 50"
2	Vincenzo Nibali (ITA)	Bahrain–Merida	+ 1' 37"
3	Wilco Kelderman (NED)	Team Sunweb	+ 2' 17"
4	Ilnur Zakarin (RUS)	Team Katusha–Alpecin	+ 2' 29"
5	Alberto Contador (ESP)	Trek–Segafredo	+ 3' 34"
6	Miguel Ángel López (COL)	Astana	+ 5' 16"
7	Michael Woods (CAN)	Cannondale–Drapac	+ 6' 33"
8	Fabio Aru (ITA)	Astana	+ 6' 33"
9	Wout Poels (NED)	Team Sky	+ 6' 47"
10	Steven Kruijswijk (NED)	LottoNL–Jumbo	+ 10' 26"

== Stage 19 ==
8 September 2017 — Caso, Redes Natural Park – Gijón, 149.7 km (93.0 mi)

Stage 19 result
Rank	Rider	Team	Time
1	Thomas De Gendt (BEL)	Lotto–Soudal	3h 35' 46"
2	Jarlinson Pantano (COL)	Trek–Segafredo	+ 0"
3	Iván García (ESP)	Bahrain–Merida	+ 0"
4	Rui Costa (POR)	UAE Team Emirates	+ 0"
5	Floris De Tier (BEL)	LottoNL–Jumbo	+ 0"
6	Bob Jungels (LUX)	Quick-Step Floors	+ 0"
7	Romain Bardet (FRA)	AG2R La Mondiale	+ 0"
8	Nicolas Roche (IRL)	BMC Racing Team	+ 0"
9	Daniel Navarro (ESP)	Cofidis	+ 0"
10	Koen Bouwman (NED)	LottoNL–Jumbo	+ 0"

General classification after Stage 19
Rank	Rider	Team	Time
1	Chris Froome (GBR)	Team Sky	75h 51' 51"
2	Vincenzo Nibali (ITA)	Bahrain–Merida	+ 1' 37"
3	Wilco Kelderman (NED)	Team Sunweb	+ 2' 17"
4	Ilnur Zakarin (RUS)	Team Katusha–Alpecin	+ 2' 29"
5	Alberto Contador (ESP)	Trek–Segafredo	+ 3' 34"
6	Miguel Ángel López (COL)	Astana	+ 5' 16"
7	Michael Woods (CAN)	Cannondale–Drapac	+ 6' 33"
8	Fabio Aru (ITA)	Astana	+ 6' 33"
9	Wout Poels (NED)	Team Sky	+ 6' 47"
10	Steven Kruijswijk (NED)	LottoNL–Jumbo	+ 10' 26"

== Stage 20 ==
9 September 2017 — Corvera de Asturias – Alto de l'Angliru, 117.5 km (73.0 mi)

Stage 20 result
Rank	Rider	Team	Time
1	Alberto Contador (ESP)	Trek–Segafredo	3h 31' 33"
2	Wout Poels (NED)	Team Sky	+ 17"
3	Chris Froome (GBR)	Team Sky	+ 17"
4	Ilnur Zakarin (RUS)	Team Katusha–Alpecin	+ 35"
5	Franco Pellizotti (ITA)	Bahrain–Merida	+ 51"
6	Vincenzo Nibali (ITA)	Bahrain–Merida	+ 51"
7	Steven Kruijswijk (NED)	LottoNL–Jumbo	+ 51"
8	Wilco Kelderman (NED)	Team Sunweb	+ 1' 11"
9	Romain Bardet (FRA)	AG2R La Mondiale	+ 1' 25"
10	Michael Woods (CAN)	Cannondale–Drapac	+ 1' 36"

General classification after Stage 20
Rank	Rider	Team	Time
1	Chris Froome (GBR)	Team Sky	79h 23' 37"
2	Vincenzo Nibali (ITA)	Bahrain–Merida	+ 2' 15"
3	Ilnur Zakarin (RUS)	Team Katusha–Alpecin	+ 2' 51"
4	Alberto Contador (ESP)	Trek–Segafredo	+ 3' 11"
5	Wilco Kelderman (NED)	Team Sunweb	+ 3' 15"
6	Wout Poels (NED)	Team Sky	+ 6' 45"
7	Michael Woods (CAN)	Cannondale–Drapac	+ 7' 56"
8	Miguel Ángel López (COL)	Astana	+ 8' 59"
9	Steven Kruijswijk (NED)	LottoNL–Jumbo	+ 11' 04"
10	Tejay van Garderen (USA)	BMC Racing Team	+ 15' 36"

== Stage 21 ==
10 September 2017 — Arroyomolinos – Madrid, 117.6 km (73.1 mi)

Stage 21 result
Rank	Rider	Team	Time
1	Matteo Trentin (ITA)	Quick-Step Floors	3h 06' 25"
2	Lorenzo Manzin (FRA)	FDJ	+ 0"
3	Søren Kragh Andersen (DEN)	Team Sunweb	+ 0"
4	Tom Van Asbroeck (BEL)	Cannondale–Drapac	+ 0"
5	Iván García (ESP)	Bahrain–Merida	+ 0"
6	Magnus Cort (DEN)	Orica–Scott	+ 0"
7	Kenneth Vanbilsen (BEL)	Cofidis	+ 0"
8	Sacha Modolo (ITA)	UAE Team Emirates	+ 0"
9	Michael Schwarzmann (GER)	Bora–Hansgrohe	+ 0"
10	Daniel Hoelgaard (NOR)	FDJ	+ 0"

General classification after Stage 21
Rank	Rider	Team	Time
1	Chris Froome (GBR)	Team Sky	82h 30' 02"
2	Vincenzo Nibali (ITA)	Bahrain–Merida	+ 2' 15"
3	Ilnur Zakarin (RUS)	Team Katusha–Alpecin	+ 2' 51"
4	Wilco Kelderman (NED)	Team Sunweb	+ 3' 15"
5	Alberto Contador (ESP)	Trek–Segafredo	+ 3' 18"
6	Wout Poels (NED)	Team Sky	+ 6' 59"
7	Michael Woods (CAN)	Cannondale–Drapac	+ 8' 27"
8	Miguel Ángel López (COL)	Astana	+ 9' 13"
9	Steven Kruijswijk (NED)	LottoNL–Jumbo	+ 11' 18"
10	Tejay van Garderen (USA)	BMC Racing Team	+ 15' 50"
