= 2017 Vuelta a España =

72nd edition of the Vuelta a España

2017 UCI World Tour, race 30 of 37

Race details
- Dates: 19 August – 10 September
- Stages: 21
- Distance: 3,324.1 km (2,065.5 mi)
- Winning time: 82h 30' 02"

Results
Jersey awarded to the overall winner	Winner	Chris Froome (GBR)	(Team Sky)
	Second	Vincenzo Nibali (ITA)	(Bahrain–Merida)
	Third	Ilnur Zakarin (RUS)	(Team Katusha–Alpecin)
Jersey awarded to the points classification winner	Points	Chris Froome (GBR)	(Team Sky)
Jersey awarded to the mountains classification winner	Mountains	Davide Villella (ITA)	(Cannondale–Drapac)
Jersey awarded to the young rider classification winner	Young rider	Miguel Ángel López (COL)	(Astana)
Jersey awarded to the combination classification winner	Combination	Chris Froome (GBR)	(Team Sky)
Jersey awarded to the combativity classification winner	Combativity	Alberto Contador (ESP)	(Trek–Segafredo)
	Team	(Kazakhstan) Astana	

The 2017 Vuelta a España was a three-week Grand Tour cycling stage race that took place in Spain between 19 August and 10 September 2017. The race was the 72nd edition of the Vuelta a España and the final Grand Tour of the 2017 cycling season. The race started in Nîmes, France, and finished in Madrid. It was the first time the race has started in France and only the third time it has started outside Spain, after 1997 (Portugal) and 2009 (Netherlands).

The general classification was won by 2017 Tour de France champion Chris Froome from Team Sky, ahead of Vincenzo Nibali of Bahrain–Merida. Froome became the third rider to win the Tour-Vuelta double after Jacques Anquetil (1963) and Bernard Hinault (1978), and the first to do so since the Vuelta was moved to its current calendar position. Froome also won the points and combination classifications, becoming the first rider to win three jerseys in a single Vuelta since Denis Menchov in 2007. The mountains classification was won by Cannondale–Drapac rider Davide Villella, while Trek–Segafredo's Alberto Contador won the combativity award in his final Grand Tour, as well as the final mountain stage atop the iconic Angliru. Astana took the team award.

== Teams ==
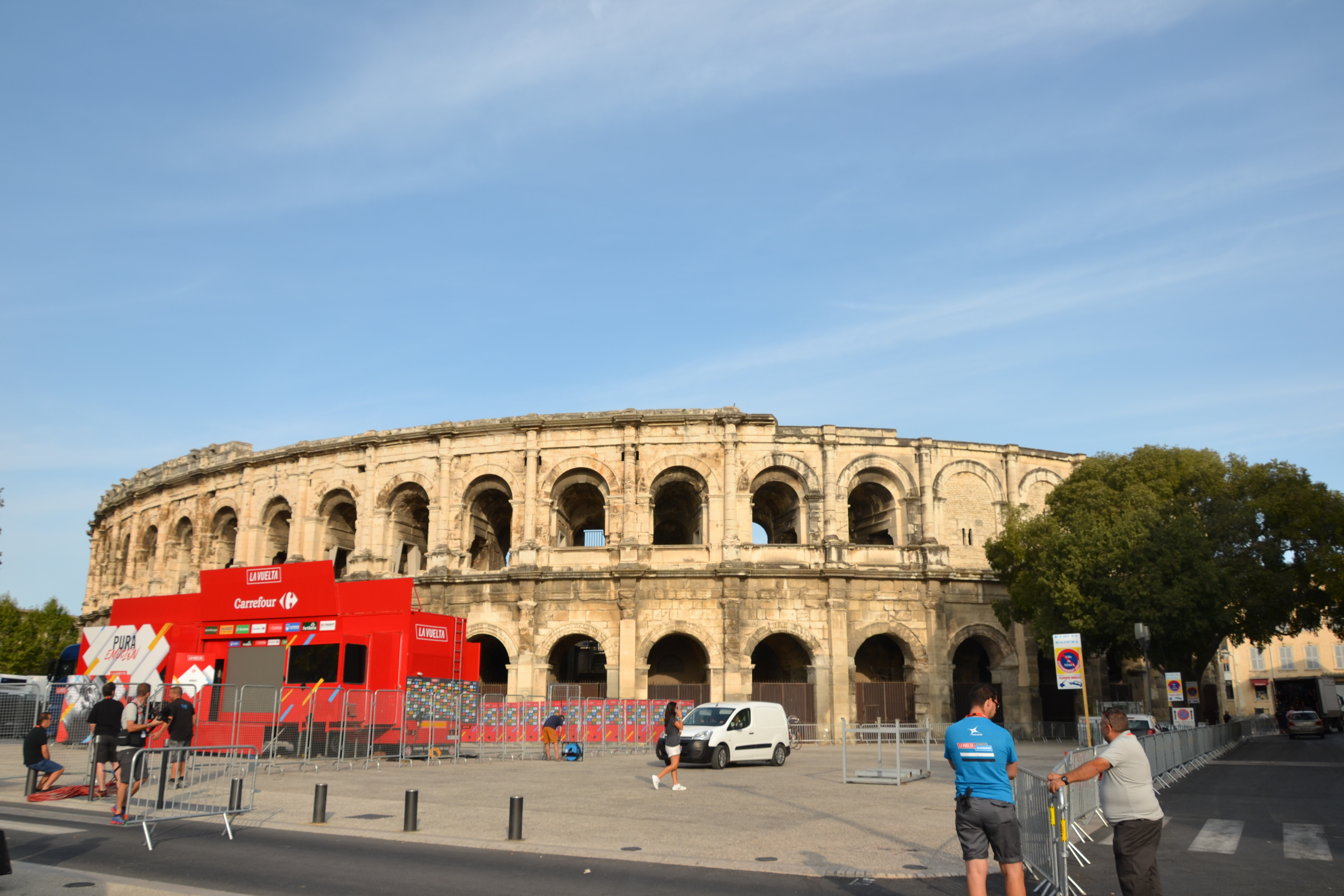
The Arena of Nîmes in Nîmes, France, hosted the team presentation ceremony on 19 August.

The 2017 edition of the Vuelta a España consisted of 22 teams. All eighteen UCI WorldTeams were entitled, and obliged, to enter the race. On 27 March 2017, the organiser of the Vuelta, Unipublic, announced the four second-tier UCI Professional Continental teams given wildcard invitations. The presentation of the teams – where the members of each team's roster are introduced in front of the media and local dignitaries – took place inside the Arena of Nîmes in Nîmes, France, on 19 August, before the start of stage one, held in the city.

Each squad was allowed a maximum of nine riders, resulting in a start list total of 198 riders. Of these, 75 were competing in their first Vuelta a España. The total number of riders that finished the race was 158. The riders came from 33 countries. Six countries had more than 10 riders in the race: Spain (31), France (20), Italy (20), Belgium (17), the Netherlands (15), and Colombia (12). The average age of riders in the race was 27.6 years, ranging from the 20-year-old Lennard Kämna (Team Sunweb) to the 40-year-old Svein Tuft (Orica–Scott). Team Manzana Postobón had the youngest average age while Trek–Segafredo had the oldest.

The teams entering the race were:

UCI WorldTeams

- AG2R La Mondiale
- Astana
- Bahrain–Merida
- BMC Racing Team
- Bora–Hansgrohe
- Cannondale–Drapac
- Team Dimension Data
- FDJ
- Team Katusha–Alpecin
- LottoNL–Jumbo
- Lotto–Soudal
- Movistar Team
- Orica–Scott
- Quick-Step Floors
- Team Sky
- Team Sunweb
- Trek–Segafredo
- UAE Team Emirates

Professional Continental teams

- Aqua Blue Sport
- Caja Rural–Seguros RGA
- Cofidis
- Team Manzana Postobón

== Pre-race favourites ==
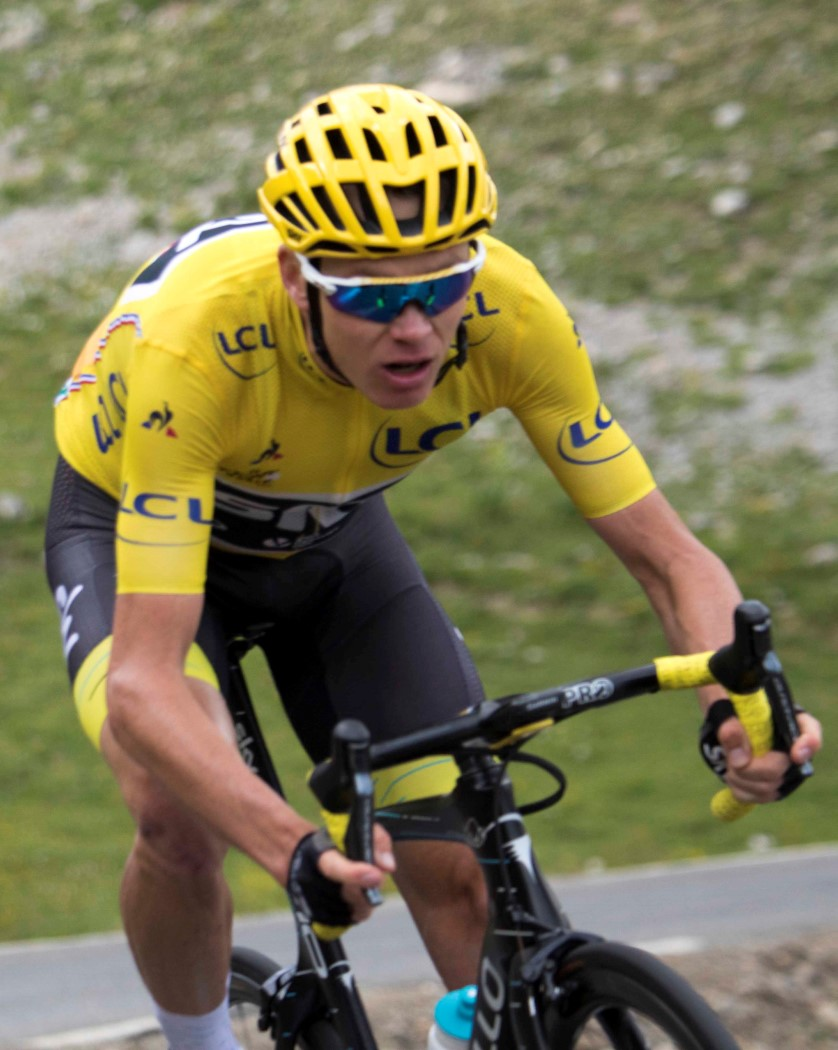
The 2017 Tour de France winner Chris Froome (Team Sky) was seen by many as the leading pre-race favourite.

Reigning Vuelta champion Nairo Quintana (Movistar Team) chose not to defend his title, after having competed in both the Giro d'Italia and the Tour de France earlier in the season. Chris Froome (Team Sky), who arrived at the Vuelta having won his fourth Tour de France the month before, was considered the favourite by most commentators and bookmakers. Froome had previously finished second at the Vuelta on three occasions. A victory in Spain would make him only the third rider after Jacques Anquetil (in 1963) and Bernard Hinault (in 1978) to win both the Tour and the Vuelta in the same season, and the first rider to do so since the race was moved in the calendar from spring to late summer. It would also make him the first British rider to win the race.

In Quintana's absence, bib number one was handed to three-time winner Alberto Contador (Trek–Segafredo), who announced in early August that he would retire from cycling after the race. Contador was considered to be among the favourites, although his performances in recent Grand Tours had cast doubt upon his potential. 2010 winner Vincenzo Nibali (Bahrain–Merida) was considered to be Froome's closest rival for overall victory, having skipped the Tour de France. Fabio Aru (Astana), winner of the 2015 edition, started the race as a favourite as well after he performed well to finish fifth overall at the Tour de France.

The previous year's third-placed finisher, Esteban Chaves (Orica–Scott), was also given chances to win the race overall. Other riders mentioned to potentially finish high in the general classification were Steven Kruijswijk (LottoNL–Jumbo) and Rafał Majka (Bora–Hansgrohe), third in 2015. Potential favourites to make their debut at the Vuelta were Ilnur Zakarin (Team Katusha–Alpecin), who had finished fifth at the Giro d'Italia in May, as well as both Adam and Simon Yates (both Orica–Scott).

== Route ==
The route of the 2017 Vuelta a España was revealed by Unipublic on 12 January 2017. Keeping with the tradition of the past few years, the race started off with a team time trial. However, the race started in France, just the third time in history that the Spanish Grand Tour began outside of its home country.

The third stage saw the race leave France, with a mountain stage to Andorra la Vella. The first uphill finale was on stage 5, with a summit finish atop the Ermita de Santa Lucía. The queen stage of the 2017 Vuelta was stage 20, which featured a summit finish atop the Alto de l'Angliru. Finally, the race ended with a customary circuit race in Madrid.

Stage characteristics and winners
Stage	Date	Course	Distance	Type	Winner
1	19 August	Nîmes (France)	13.7 km (9 mi)	Team time trial	(United States) BMC Racing Team
2	20 August	Nîmes (France) to Gruissan, Grand Narbonne (France)	203.4 km (126 mi)	Flat stage	Yves Lampaert (BEL)
3	21 August	Prades (France) to Andorra la Vella (Andorra)	158.5 km (98 mi)	Mountain stage	Vincenzo Nibali (ITA)
4	22 August	Escaldes-Engordany to Tarragona	198.2 km (123 mi)	Flat stage	Matteo Trentin (ITA)
5	23 August	Benicàssim to Alcossebre	175.7 km (109 mi)	Hilly stage	Alexey Lutsenko (KAZ)
6	24 August	Villarreal to Sagunto	204.4 km (127 mi)	Hilly stage	Tomasz Marczyński (POL)
7	25 August	Llíria to Cuenca	207 km (129 mi)	Flat stage	Matej Mohorič (SLO)
8	26 August	Hellín to Xorret de Catí	199.5 km (124 mi)	Hilly stage	Julian Alaphilippe (FRA)
9	27 August	Orihuela to Benitachell / El Poble Nou de Benitatxell	174 km (108 mi)	Hilly stage	Chris Froome (GBR)
	28 August	Province of Alicante	Rest day		
10	29 August	Caravaca de la Cruz to ElPozo Alimentación, Alhama de Murcia	164.8 km (102 mi)	Hilly stage	Matteo Trentin (ITA)
11	30 August	Lorca to Calar Alto Observatory	187.5 km (117 mi)	Mountain stage	Miguel Ángel López (COL)
12	31 August	Motril to Antequera	160.1 km (99 mi)	Hilly stage	Tomasz Marczyński (POL)
13	1 September	Coín to Tomares	198.4 km (123 mi)	Flat stage	Matteo Trentin (ITA)
14	2 September	Écija to Sierra de La Pandera	175 km (109 mi)	Mountain stage	Rafał Majka (POL)
15	3 September	Alcalá la Real to Alto Hoya de la Mora, Sierra Nevada	129.4 km (80 mi)	Mountain stage	Miguel Ángel López (COL)
	4 September	Logroño	Rest day		
16	5 September	Circuito de Navarra to Logroño	40.2 km (25 mi)	Individual time trial	Chris Froome (GBR)
17	6 September	Villadiego to Alto de Los Machucos	180.5 km (112 mi)	Mountain stage	~~Stefan Denifl (AUT)~~; Alberto Contador (ESP)
18	7 September	Suances to Santo Toribio de Liébana	169 km (105 mi)	Hilly stage	Sander Armée (BEL)
19	8 September	Caso, Redes Natural Park to Gijón	149.7 km (93 mi)	Hilly stage	Thomas De Gendt (BEL)
20	9 September	Corvera de Asturias to Alto de l'Angliru	117.5 km (73 mi)	Mountain stage	Alberto Contador (ESP)
21	10 September	Arroyomolinos to Madrid	117.6 km (73 mi)	Flat stage	Matteo Trentin (ITA)
Total			3,324.1 km (2,065 mi)		

== Classification leadership ==
The Vuelta a España had three individual classifications, for which jerseys were awarded daily to the leading rider, as well as a team competition. The primary classification was the general classification, which was calculated by adding each rider's finishing times on each stage. Time bonuses were awarded at the end of every stage apart from the two individual time trials. The rider with the lowest cumulative time was the leader of the general classification, and wears the red jersey. The leader of the general classification at the end of the race was considered the overall winner of the Vuelta a España.

The second classification was the points classification. Riders received points for finishing among the highest placed in a stage finish, or in intermediate sprints during the stage. The points available for each stage finish were determined by the stage's type. The leader was identified by a green jersey.

Mountains classification points
Category	1st	2nd	3rd	4th	5th	6th
Cima Alberto Fernández	20	15	10	6	4	2
Special-category	15	10	6	4	2	
First-category	10	6	4	2	1	
Second-category	5	3	1			
Third-category	3	2	1			

The next classification was the mountains classification. Points were awarded to the riders that reached the summit of the most difficult climbs first. The climbs were categorized, in order of increasing difficulty, third-, second-, and first- and special-category. The leader wore a white jersey with blue polka dots.

The final of the individual classifications was the combination classification. A rider's ranking in the combination classification was determined by tallying up his positions in the general, points, and mountains classifications. The leader wore a white jersey. If no rider was classified in all three classifications, riders classified in two would have been considered, and if that was tied the general classification will decide the winner.

There was also the team classification. After each stage, the times of the three highest finishers of each team are added together. The victory was awarded to the team with the lowest cumulative time at the end of the event.

In addition, there were two individual awards: the combativity award and the young rider award. The combativity award was given after each stage to the rider "who displayed the most generous effort and best sporting spirit." The daily winner wore a green number bib the following stage. At the end of the Vuelta, a jury decides the top three riders for the "Most Combative Rider of La Vuelta", with a public vote deciding the victor. The young rider award is calculated the same way as the general classification, but the classification was restricted to riders who were born on or after 1 January 1992. The leader wore a red number bib.

A total of €1,120,230 will be awarded in cash prizes in the race. The overall winner of the general classification will receive €150,000, with the second and third placed riders getting €57,000 and €30,000 respectively. All finishers in the top 20 were awarded with money. The holders of the four individual classifications benefited on each stage they led. The final winners of the points and combined were given €11,000, while the mountains classification got €23,100 and the most combative rider got €3,000. The team classification winners were given €12,500. €11,000 was given to the winners of each stage of the race, with smaller amounts given to places 2–20. There was also a special award with a prize of €1,000, the Cima Alberto Fernández, given to first rider (Miguel Ángel López) to reach the summit of the Alto Hoya de la Mora at the finish of stage fifteen.

Classification leadership by stage
Stage	Winner	General classification	Points classification	Mountains classification	Combination classification	Team classification	Combativity award	Young rider award
1	BMC Racing Team	Rohan Dennis	not awarded (Note: Although Rohan Dennis received the jersey on the podium in Nîmes, no points were on offer during the stage. Alessandro De Marchi wore the jersey in stage two.)	Nicolas Roche	Daniel Oss	BMC Racing Team	not awarded	Bob Jungels
2	Yves Lampaert	Yves Lampaert	Yves Lampaert (Note: In stage three, Matteo Trentin, who was second in the points classification, wore the green jersey, because first-placed Yves Lampaert wore the red jersey as leader of the general classification.)	Nicolas Roche	Daniel Oss	Quick-Step Floors	Markel Irizar	Julian Alaphilippe
3	Vincenzo Nibali	Chris Froome	Vincenzo Nibali	Davide Villella	Chris Froome (Note: In stages four to eight and ten to fourteen, Esteban Chaves, who was second in the combination classification, wore the white jersey, because first-placed Chris Froome wore the red jersey as leader of the general classification. In stage nine, Jan Polanc wore the white jersey for the same reason, as did Vincenzo Nibali in stage fifteen, Miguel Ángel López in stages sixteen to twenty and Alberto Contador in stage twenty-one.)	Orica–Scott	Alexandre Geniez	Adam Yates
4	Matteo Trentin	Chris Froome	Matteo Trentin	Davide Villella	Chris Froome	Orica–Scott	Diego Rubio	Adam Yates
5	Alexey Lutsenko	Chris Froome	Matteo Trentin	Davide Villella	Chris Froome	Astana	Alexey Lutsenko	Adam Yates
6	Tomasz Marczyński	Chris Froome	Matteo Trentin	Davide Villella	Chris Froome	Astana	Enric Mas	Adam Yates
7	Matej Mohorič	Chris Froome	Matteo Trentin	Davide Villella	Chris Froome	Movistar Team	Luis Ángel Maté	Adam Yates
8	Julian Alaphilippe	Chris Froome	Matteo Trentin	Davide Villella	Chris Froome	Movistar Team	Przemysław Niemiec	Adam Yates
9	Chris Froome	Chris Froome	Chris Froome (Note: In stages ten, sixteen, seventeen, nineteen and twenty, Matteo Trentin, who was second in the points classification, wore the green jersey, because first-placed Chris Froome wore the red jersey as leader of the general classification. In stages eighteen and twenty-one, Vincenzo Nibali wore the green jersey for the same reason.)	Davide Villella	Chris Froome	Movistar Team	Marc Soler	Adam Yates
10	Matteo Trentin	Chris Froome	Matteo Trentin	Davide Villella	Chris Froome	Movistar Team	Matteo Trentin	Adam Yates
11	Miguel Ángel López	Chris Froome	Matteo Trentin	Davide Villella	Chris Froome	Movistar Team	Romain Bardet	Miguel Ángel López
12	Tomasz Marczyński	Chris Froome	Matteo Trentin	Davide Villella	Chris Froome	Movistar Team	Omar Fraile	Miguel Ángel López
13	Matteo Trentin	Chris Froome	Matteo Trentin	Davide Villella	Chris Froome	Astana	Thomas De Gendt	Miguel Ángel López
14	Rafał Majka	Chris Froome	Matteo Trentin	Davide Villella	Chris Froome	Astana	Luis Ángel Maté	Miguel Ángel López
15	Miguel Ángel López	Chris Froome	Chris Froome	Davide Villella	Chris Froome	Astana	Sander Armée	Miguel Ángel López
16	Chris Froome	Chris Froome	Chris Froome	Davide Villella	Chris Froome	Astana	Chris Froome	Miguel Ángel López
17	~~Stefan Denifl~~	Chris Froome	Chris Froome	Davide Villella	Chris Froome	Astana	Daniel Moreno	Miguel Ángel López
18	Sander Armée	Chris Froome	Chris Froome	Davide Villella	Chris Froome	Astana	José Joaquín Rojas	Miguel Ángel López
19	Thomas De Gendt	Chris Froome	Chris Froome	Davide Villella	Chris Froome	Astana	Daniel Navarro	Miguel Ángel López
20	Alberto Contador	Chris Froome	Chris Froome	Davide Villella	Chris Froome	Astana	Enric Mas	Miguel Ángel López
21	Matteo Trentin	Chris Froome	Chris Froome	Davide Villella	Chris Froome	Astana	not awarded	Miguel Ángel López
Final		Chris Froome	Chris Froome	Davide Villella	Chris Froome	Astana	Alberto Contador	Miguel Ángel López

== Final standings ==
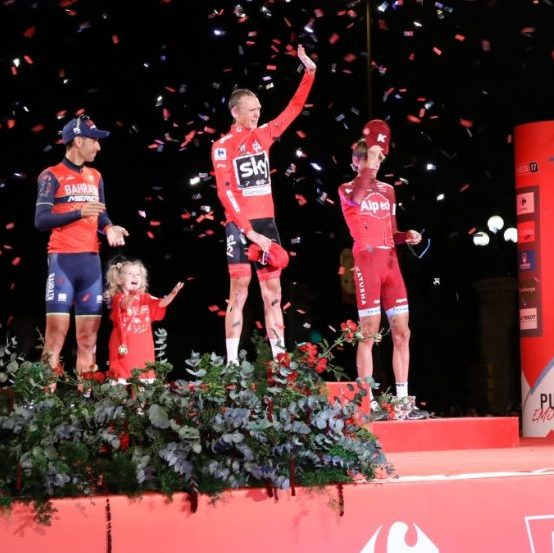
Final podium of the 2017 Vuelta a España.

Legend
General classification	Denotes the leader of the general classification	Points classification	Denotes the leader of the points classification
Mountains classification	Denotes the leader of the mountains classification	Combination classification	Denotes the leader of the combination classification
A white jersey with a green number bib.	Denotes the winner of the combativity award	A white jersey with a red number bib.	Denotes the winner of the young rider award

=== General classification ===
Final general classification (1–10)
Rank	Rider	Team	Time
1	Chris Froome (GBR)	Team Sky	82h 30' 02"
2	Vincenzo Nibali (ITA)	Bahrain–Merida	+ 2' 15"
3	Ilnur Zakarin (RUS)	Team Katusha–Alpecin	+ 2' 51"
4	Wilco Kelderman (NED)	Team Sunweb	+ 3' 15"
5	Alberto Contador (ESP)	Trek–Segafredo	+ 3' 18"
6	Wout Poels (NED)	Team Sky	+ 6' 59"
7	Michael Woods (CAN)	Cannondale–Drapac	+ 8' 27"
8	Miguel Ángel López (COL)	Astana	+ 9' 13"
9	Steven Kruijswijk (NED)	LottoNL–Jumbo	+ 11' 18"
10	Tejay van Garderen (USA)	BMC Racing Team	+ 15' 50"

Final general classification (11–158)
Rank	Rider	Team	Time
11	Esteban Chaves (COL)	Orica–Scott	+ 16' 46"
12	Louis Meintjes (RSA)	UAE Team Emirates	+ 17' 41"
13	Fabio Aru (ITA)	Astana	+ 21' 41"
14	Nicolas Roche (IRL)	BMC Racing Team	+ 22' 00"
15	Sergio Pardilla (ESP)	Caja Rural–Seguros RGA	+ 22' 59"
16	Mikel Nieve (ESP)	Team Sky	+ 28' 00"
17	Romain Bardet (FRA)	AG2R La Mondiale	+ 31' 21"
18	Daniel Moreno (ESP)	Movistar Team	+ 42' 16"
19	Sander Armée (BEL)	Lotto–Soudal	+ 59' 01"
20	Darwin Atapuma (COL)	UAE Team Emirates	+ 1h 02' 58"
21	Jack Haig (AUS)	Orica–Scott	+ 1h 04' 48"
22	José Joaquín Rojas (ESP)	Movistar Team	+ 1h 05' 02"
23	Pello Bilbao (ESP)	Astana	+ 1h 06' 22"
24	Luis Ángel Maté (ESP)	Cofidis	+ 1h 13' 27"
25	Franco Pellizotti (ITA)	Bahrain–Merida	+ 1h 13' 36"
26	Jaime Rosón (ESP)	Caja Rural–Seguros RGA	+ 1h 17' 12"
27	Gianni Moscon (ITA)	Team Sky	+ 1h 21' 17"
28	Antwan Tolhoek (NED)	LottoNL–Jumbo	+ 1h 21' 46"
29	Stef Clement (NED)	LottoNL–Jumbo	+ 1h 26' 13"
30	Matej Mohorič (SLO)	UAE Team Emirates	+ 1h 31' 24"
31	Peter Stetina (USA)	Trek–Segafredo	+ 1h 36' 35"
32	Luis León Sánchez (ESP)	Astana	+ 1h 36' 50"
33	Jarlinson Pantano (COL)	Trek–Segafredo	+ 1h 39' 27"
34	Adam Yates (GBR)	Orica–Scott	+ 1h 39' 51"
35	Igor Antón (ESP)	Team Dimension Data	+ 1h 42' 33"
36	Richard Carapaz (ECU)	Movistar Team	+ 1h 43' 59"
37	Hernán Aguirre (COL)	Team Manzana Postobón	+ 1h 49' 26"
38	Jan Polanc (SLO)	UAE Team Emirates	+ 1h 52' 14"
39	Rafał Majka (POL)	Bora–Hansgrohe	+ 1h 53' 59"
40	Bart De Clercq (BEL)	Lotto–Soudal	+ 1h 54' 19"
41	Koen Bouwman (NED)	LottoNL–Jumbo	+ 1h 55' 00"
42	Bob Jungels (LUX)	Quick-Step Floors	+ 1h 58' 17"
43	Rui Costa (POR)	UAE Team Emirates	+ 1h 58' 46"
44	Simon Yates (GBR)	Orica–Scott	+ 2h 02' 43"
45	Aldemar Reyes (COL)	Team Manzana Postobón	+ 2h 03' 25"
46	Giovanni Visconti (ITA)	Bahrain–Merida	+ 2h 11' 10"
47	Nelson Oliveira (POR)	Movistar Team	+ 2h 16' 03"
48	Marc Soler (ESP)	Movistar Team	+ 2h 19' 27"
49	Bernardo Suaza (COL)	Team Manzana Postobón	+ 2h 23' 21"
50	Ricardo Vilela (POR)	Team Manzana Postobón	+ 2h 25' 21"
51	Antonio Pedrero (ESP)	Movistar Team	+ 2h 27' 03"
52	Anthony Roux (FRA)	FDJ	+ 2h 28' 01"
53	Diego Rosa (ITA)	Team Sky	+ 2h 31' 16"
54	Stéphane Rossetto (FRA)	Cofidis	+ 2h 33' 53"
55	Tomasz Marczyński (POL)	Lotto–Soudal	+ 2h 34' 33"
56	Fabricio Ferrari (URU)	Caja Rural–Seguros RGA	+ 2h 39' 52"
57	Thomas De Gendt (BEL)	Lotto–Soudal	+ 2h 39' 53"
58	Stefan Denifl (AUT)	Aqua Blue Sport	+ 2h 41' 15"
59	Tobias Ludvigsson (SWE)	FDJ	+ 2h 42' 20"
60	Daan Olivier (NED)	LottoNL–Jumbo	+ 2h 42' 35"
61	Clément Chevrier (FRA)	AG2R La Mondiale	+ 2h 42' 41"
62	Floris De Tier (BEL)	LottoNL–Jumbo	+ 2h 44' 41"
63	Jérémy Maison (FRA)	FDJ	+ 2h 45' 01"
64	Jesús Hernández (ESP)	Trek–Segafredo	+ 2h 45' 39"
65	Emanuel Buchmann (GER)	Bora–Hansgrohe	+ 2h 57' 29"
66	David López (ESP)	Team Sky	+ 2h 58' 17"
67	Paweł Poljański (POL)	Bora–Hansgrohe	+ 2h 58' 35"
68	Julian Alaphilippe (FRA)	Quick-Step Floors	+ 2h 59' 11"
69	Jetse Bol (NED)	Team Manzana Postobón	+ 2h 59' 17"
70	Alessandro De Marchi (ITA)	BMC Racing Team	+ 3h 00' 15"
71	Enric Mas (ESP)	Quick-Step Floors	+ 3h 02' 34"
72	Alberto Losada (ESP)	Team Katusha–Alpecin	+ 3h 06' 59"
73	Carlos Verona (ESP)	Orica–Scott	+ 3h 07' 12"
74	Simon Clarke (AUS)	Cannondale–Drapac	+ 3h 07' 58"
75	Alexey Lutsenko (KAZ)	Astana	+ 3h 08' 08"
76	Héctor Sáez (ESP)	Caja Rural–Seguros RGA	+ 3h 09' 06"
77	Koen de Kort (NED)	Trek–Segafredo	+ 3h 09' 17"
78	Salvatore Puccio (ITA)	Team Sky	+ 3h 09' 44"
79	Valerio Agnoli (ITA)	Bahrain–Merida	+ 3h 09' 53"
80	Anthony Perez (FRA)	Cofidis	+ 3h 13' 46"
81	Daniel Navarro (ESP)	Cofidis	+ 3h 17' 49"
82	Jacques Janse van Rensburg (RSA)	Team Dimension Data	+ 3h 18' 23"
83	Lluís Mas (ESP)	Caja Rural–Seguros RGA	+ 3h 18' 29"
84	Matteo Trentin (ITA)	Quick-Step Floors	+ 3h 18' 41"
85	Julien Bernard (FRA)	Trek–Segafredo	+ 3h 22' 16"
86	Przemysław Niemiec (POL)	UAE Team Emirates	+ 3h 25' 48"
87	Juan Felipe Osorio (COL)	Team Manzana Postobón	+ 3h 27' 41"
88	Guillaume Bonnafond (FRA)	Cofidis	+ 3h 28' 17"
89	David Arroyo (ESP)	Caja Rural–Seguros RGA	+ 3h 32' 34"
90	Lachlan Morton (AUS)	Team Dimension Data	+ 3h 32' 57"
91	Edward Theuns (BEL)	Trek–Segafredo	+ 3h 33' 03"
92	Francisco Ventoso (ESP)	BMC Racing Team	+ 3h 33' 37"
93	Fernando Orjuela (COL)	Team Manzana Postobón	+ 3h 33' 54"
94	Sergey Chernetskiy (RUS)	Astana	+ 3h 35' 00"
95	Adam Hansen (AUS)	Lotto–Soudal	+ 3h 37' 11"
96	Patrick Konrad (AUT)	Bora–Hansgrohe	+ 3h 37' 18"
97	Davide Villella (ITA)	Cannondale–Drapac	+ 3h 37' 57"
98	Chad Haga (USA)	Team Sunweb	+ 3h 44' 08"
99	Alexis Gougeard (FRA)	AG2R La Mondiale	+ 3h 46' 38"
100	Iván García (ESP)	Bahrain–Merida	+ 3h 47' 27"
101	Joe Dombrowski (USA)	Cannondale–Drapac	+ 3h 47' 58"
102	Antonio Nibali (ITA)	Bahrain–Merida	+ 3h 50' 02"
103	Arnaud Courteille (FRA)	FDJ	+ 3h 50' 13"
104	Eros Capecchi (ITA)	Quick-Step Floors	+ 3h 52' 20"
105	Domen Novak (SLO)	Bahrain–Merida	+ 3h 52' 56"
106	Søren Kragh Andersen (DEN)	Team Sunweb	+ 3h 52' 58"
107	Christopher Juul-Jensen (DEN)	Orica–Scott	+ 3h 53' 31"
108	Julien Duval (FRA)	AG2R La Mondiale	+ 3h 54' 03"
109	Damiano Caruso (ITA)	BMC Racing Team	+ 3h 54' 23"
110	Bert-Jan Lindeman (NED)	LottoNL–Jumbo	+ 3h 55' 09"
111	Nick Schultz (AUS)	Caja Rural–Seguros RGA	+ 3h 55' 40"
112	Loïc Vliegen (BEL)	BMC Racing Team	+ 3h 56' 01"
113	Brendan Canty (AUS)	Cannondale–Drapac	+ 3h 57' 55"
114	Juan José Lobato (ESP)	LottoNL–Jumbo	+ 4h 02' 01"
115	Hugo Houle (CAN)	AG2R La Mondiale	+ 4h 03' 18"
116	Manuele Boaro (ITA)	Bahrain–Merida	+ 4h 03' 24"
117	Anthony Turgis (FRA)	Cofidis	+ 4h 06' 21"
118	Marco Haller (AUT)	Team Katusha–Alpecin	+ 4h 06' 31"
119	Markel Irizar (ESP)	Trek–Segafredo	+ 4h 07' 16"
120	Johannes Fröhlinger (GER)	Team Sunweb	+ 4h 08' 43"
121	Chris Hamilton (AUS)	Team Sunweb	+ 4h 12' 42"
122	Laurens De Vreese (BEL)	Astana	+ 4h 12' 46"
123	Toms Skujiņš (LAT)	Cannondale–Drapac	+ 4h 13' 16"
124	Christian Knees (GER)	Team Sky	+ 4h 13' 46"
125	Daniel Hoelgaard (NOR)	FDJ	+ 4h 17' 04"
126	Magnus Cort (DEN)	Orica–Scott	+ 4h 17' 37"
127	Diego Rubio (ESP)	Caja Rural–Seguros RGA	+ 4h 19' 46"
128	Michel Kreder (NED)	Aqua Blue Sport	+ 4h 21' 18"
129	Tim Declercq (BEL)	Quick-Step Floors	+ 4h 21' 20"
130	Niki Terpstra (NED)	Quick-Step Floors	+ 4h 23' 54"
131	Sacha Modolo (ITA)	UAE Team Emirates	+ 4h 27' 08"
132	Rafael Reis (POR)	Caja Rural–Seguros RGA	+ 4h 27' 14"
133	Tom Van Asbroeck (BEL)	Cannondale–Drapac	+ 4h 29' 59"
134	Maxim Belkov (RUS)	Team Katusha–Alpecin	+ 4h 30' 01"
135	Hernando Bohórquez (COL)	Team Manzana Postobón	+ 4h 31' 44"
136	Yves Lampaert (BEL)	Quick-Step Floors	+ 4h 32' 02"
137	Michael Mørkøv (DEN)	Team Katusha–Alpecin	+ 4h 33' 01"
138	Mark Christian (GBR)	Aqua Blue Sport	+ 4h 36' 26"
139	Lasse Norman Hansen (DEN)	Aqua Blue Sport	+ 4h 38' 56"
140	Aaron Gate (NZL)	Aqua Blue Sport	+ 4h 40' 07"
141	Peter Koning (NED)	Aqua Blue Sport	+ 4h 41' 00"
142	Christoph Pfingsten (GER)	Bora–Hansgrohe	+ 4h 41' 29"
143	Sam Bewley (NZL)	Orica–Scott	+ 4h 43' 27"
144	Andreas Schillinger (GER)	Bora–Hansgrohe	+ 4h 44' 03"
145	Nikita Stalnov (KAZ)	Astana	+ 4h 44' 07"
146	Kenneth Vanbilsen (BEL)	Cofidis	+ 4h 44' 33"
147	Rein Taaramäe (EST)	Team Katusha–Alpecin	+ 4h 46' 21"
148	Ian Stannard (GBR)	Team Sky	+ 4h 47' 00"
149	Federico Zurlo (ITA)	UAE Team Emirates	+ 4h 47' 04"
150	Rémy Mertz (BEL)	Lotto–Soudal	+ 4h 49' 50"
151	Jelle Wallays (BEL)	Lotto–Soudal	+ 4h 53' 38"
152	Juan Sebastián Molano (COL)	Team Manzana Postobón	+ 4h 54' 27"
153	Thomas Scully (NZL)	Cannondale–Drapac	+ 4h 56' 59"
154	Michael Schwarzmann (GER)	Bora–Hansgrohe	+ 4h 57' 10"
155	Adam Blythe (GBR)	Aqua Blue Sport	+ 4h 58' 28"
156	Lorrenzo Manzin (FRA)	FDJ	+ 5h 01' 29"
157	William Clarke (AUS)	Cannondale–Drapac	+ 5h 03' 10"
158	Conor Dunne (IRL)	Aqua Blue Sport	+ 5h 16' 23"

=== Points classification ===
Final points classification (1–10)
Rank	Rider	Team	Points
1	Chris Froome (GBR)	Team Sky	158
2	Matteo Trentin (ITA)	Quick-Step Floors	156
3	Vincenzo Nibali (ITA)	Bahrain–Merida	128
4	Alberto Contador (ESP)	Trek–Segafredo	105
5	Wilco Kelderman (NED)	Team Sunweb	97
6	Ilnur Zakarin (RUS)	Team Katusha–Alpecin	93
7	Miguel Ángel López (COL)	Astana	90
8	José Joaquín Rojas (ESP)	Movistar Team	70
9	Michael Woods (CAN)	Cannondale–Drapac	61
10	Esteban Chaves (COL)	Orica–Scott	61

=== Mountains classification ===
Final mountains classification (1–10)
Rank	Rider	Team	Points
1	Davide Villella (ITA)	Cannondale–Drapac	67
2	Miguel Ángel López (COL)	Astana	47
3	Chris Froome (GBR)	Team Sky	35
4	José Joaquín Rojas (ESP)	Movistar Team	33
5	Thomas De Gendt (BEL)	Lotto–Soudal	30
6	Tomasz Marczyński (POL)	Lotto–Soudal	28
7	Rafał Majka (POL)	Bora–Hansgrohe	28
DSQ	~~Stefan Denifl (AUT)~~	Aqua Blue Sport	28
9	Alberto Contador (ESP)	Trek–Segafredo	27
10	Romain Bardet (FRA)	AG2R La Mondiale	25

=== Combination classification ===
Final combination classification (1–10)
Rank	Rider	Team	Points
1	Chris Froome (GBR)	Team Sky	5
2	Miguel Ángel López (COL)	Astana	17
3	Alberto Contador (ESP)	Trek–Segafredo	18
4	Ilnur Zakarin (RUS)	Team Katusha–Alpecin	20
5	Vincenzo Nibali (ITA)	Bahrain–Merida	22
6	Wilco Kelderman (NED)	Team Sunweb	27
7	José Joaquín Rojas (ESP)	Movistar Team	34
8	Esteban Chaves (COL)	Orica–Scott	37
9	Wout Poels (NED)	Team Sky	40
10	Romain Bardet (FRA)	AG2R La Mondiale	45

=== Team classification ===
Final team classification (1–10)
Rank	Team	Time
1	(Kazakhstan) Astana	247h 16' 21"
2	(Spain) Movistar Team	+ 6' 16"
3	(United Kingdom) Team Sky	+ 8' 12"
4	(United Arab Emirates) UAE Team Emirates	+ 49' 02"
5	(Netherlands) LottoNL–Jumbo	+ 1h 07' 28"
6	(Australia) Orica–Scott	+ 1h 35' 21"
7	Bahrain–Merida	+ 2h 02' 09"
8	(Spain) Caja Rural–Seguros RGA	+ 2h 07' 45"
9	(United States) BMC Racing Team	+ 2h 10' 38"
10	(Belgium) Quick-Step Floors	+ 2h 28' 01"

== UCI rankings ==
The race was the 25th of the 38 events in the UCI World Tour, with riders from the WorldTeams competing for individually and for their teams for points that contributed towards the rankings. Riders from both the WorldTeams and Professional Continental teams also competed individually and for their nations for points that contributed towards the UCI World Ranking, which included all UCI races. The points accrued by Chris Froome moved him up to second from tenth in the World Tour and rose to third from sixth in the World Ranking. Greg Van Avermaet (BMC Racing Team) held the lead of both individual rankings. Team Sky took the lead of the World Tour team ranking and Belgium remained top of the World Ranking nation ranking.

UCI World Tour individual ranking on 10 September 2017 (1–10)
Rank	Prev.	Name	Team	Points
1	1	Greg Van Avermaet (BEL)	BMC Racing Team	3582
2	10	Chris Froome (GBR)	Team Sky	3452
3	2	Tom Dumoulin (NED)	Team Sunweb	2545
4	3	Peter Sagan (SVK)	Bora–Hansgrohe	2544
5	4	Michał Kwiatkowski (POL)	Team Sky	2171
6	5	Alejandro Valverde (ESP)	Movistar Team	2105
7	7	Michael Matthews (AUS)	Team Sunweb	2049
8	6	Dan Martin (IRL)	Quick-Step Floors	2040
9	13	Alberto Contador (ESP)	Trek–Segafredo	1987
10	8	Richie Porte (AUS)	BMC Racing Team	1882

UCI World Ranking individual ranking on 11 September 2017 (1–10)
Rank	Prev.	Name	Team	Points
1	1	Greg Van Avermaet (BEL)	BMC Racing Team	4323.25
2	2	Peter Sagan (SVK)	Bora–Hansgrohe	3720
3	6	Chris Froome (GBR)	Team Sky	3492
4	4	Alejandro Valverde (ESP)	Movistar Team	2823
5	5	Tom Dumoulin (NED)	Team Sunweb	2711
6	7	Alexander Kristoff (NOR)	Team Katusha–Alpecin	2637
7	9	Michał Kwiatkowski (POL)	Team Sky	2445
8	8	Michael Matthews (AUS)	Team Sunweb	2409
9	10	Philippe Gilbert (BEL)	Quick-Step Floors	2396
10	14	Alberto Contador (ESP)	Trek–Segafredo	2242

== Adverse analytical finding ==
On 13 December 2017, it was announced by Team Sky that Chris Froome was found with 2000 ng/ml of Salbutamol in a sample collected on 7 September, after the finish of stage 18. Froome, who has asthma, is allowed a dose of 1000 ng/ml. If the UCI had found this to be a doping violation, he could have lost his Vuelta title and faced a potential ban from competitive cycling. On 2 July 2018, the UCI, with the cooperation of WADA, ruled that upon review of the submitted evidence that there was no wrongdoing and closed the case, exonerating Froome and allowing his 2017 Vuelta win to stand.

== See also ==
- 2017 in men's road cycling
- 2017 in sports

== Notes and references ==
=== Sources ===
- Race regulations (PDF). Madrid: Unipublic. 2017. Archived (PDF) from the original on 29 August 2017.
