= Aldemar Reyes =

Colombian cyclist (born 1995)

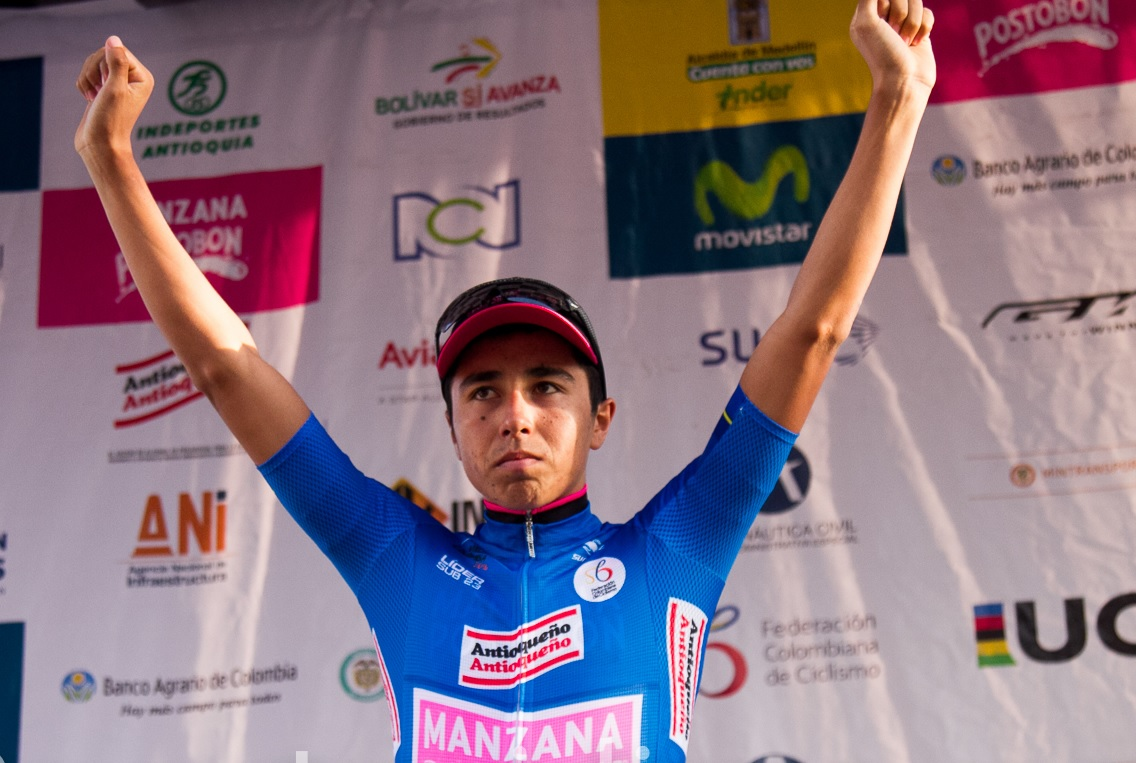
- Reyes in 2016.

Personal information
- Full name: Aldemar Reyes Ortega
- Born: 22 April 1995 (age 31) Ramiriquí, Colombia
- Height: 1.70 m (5 ft 7 in)
- Weight: 55 kg (121 lb)

Cycling career
- Sport: Cycling
- Current team: Retired
- Discipline: Road
- Role: Rider
- Rider type: Climber

Amateur team
- 2014–2015: GW–Chaoyang–Kixx–Envia–Gatorade

Professional teams
- 2016–2019: Team Manzana Postobón
- 2019: GW–Shimano
- 2020: EPM–Scott
- 2022–2023: Team Medellín–EPM
- 2024: Team Banco Guayaquil–Bianchi
- 2024: Team Medellín–EPM

Aldemar Reyes Ortega (born 22 April 1995) is a Colombian former professional racing cyclist. Professional from 2016 to 2024, he competed in the 2017 Vuelta a España and won the 2023 Clásico RCN.

== Major results ==
2014
1st Young rider classification, Vuelta a Colombia
2016
4th Overall Giro della Valle d'Aosta
5th Overall Ronde de l'Isard
6th Overall Tour Alsace
10th Overall Vuelta a Colombia

1st Young rider classification

10th Overall Grande Prémio Internacional de Torres Vedras

1st Young rider classification

2017
1st Mountains classification Volta ao Alentejo
6th Circuito de Getxo
7th Overall Vuelta a la Comunidad de Madrid

1st Mountains classification

2020
1st Overall Vuelta al Tolima

1st Stage 1

2021
7th Overall Vuelta a Colombia

1st Points classification
1st Stage 5

2022
1st Road race, Bolivarian Games
1st Overall Clásico RCN

1st Stages 2 & 4

3rd Overall Vuelta del Porvenir San Luis
Vuelta a Colombia

1st Points classification
1st Stage 8

2023
1st Overall Clásico RCN

1st Stage 9 (ITT)

2nd Gran Premio Guatemala
3rd Gran Premio Chapin
4th Overall Vuelta a Colombia
7th Overall Vuelta a Formosa
9th Overall Tour de Catamarca
2024
1st Stage 1 (TTT) Clásico RCN
6th Overall Vuelta a Guatemala

=== Grand Tour general classification results timeline ===
Grand Tour	2017
Giro d'Italia	—
Tour de France	—
Vuelta a España	45

Legend
—	Did not compete
DNF	Did not finish
