= Jérémy Maison =

French road cyclist

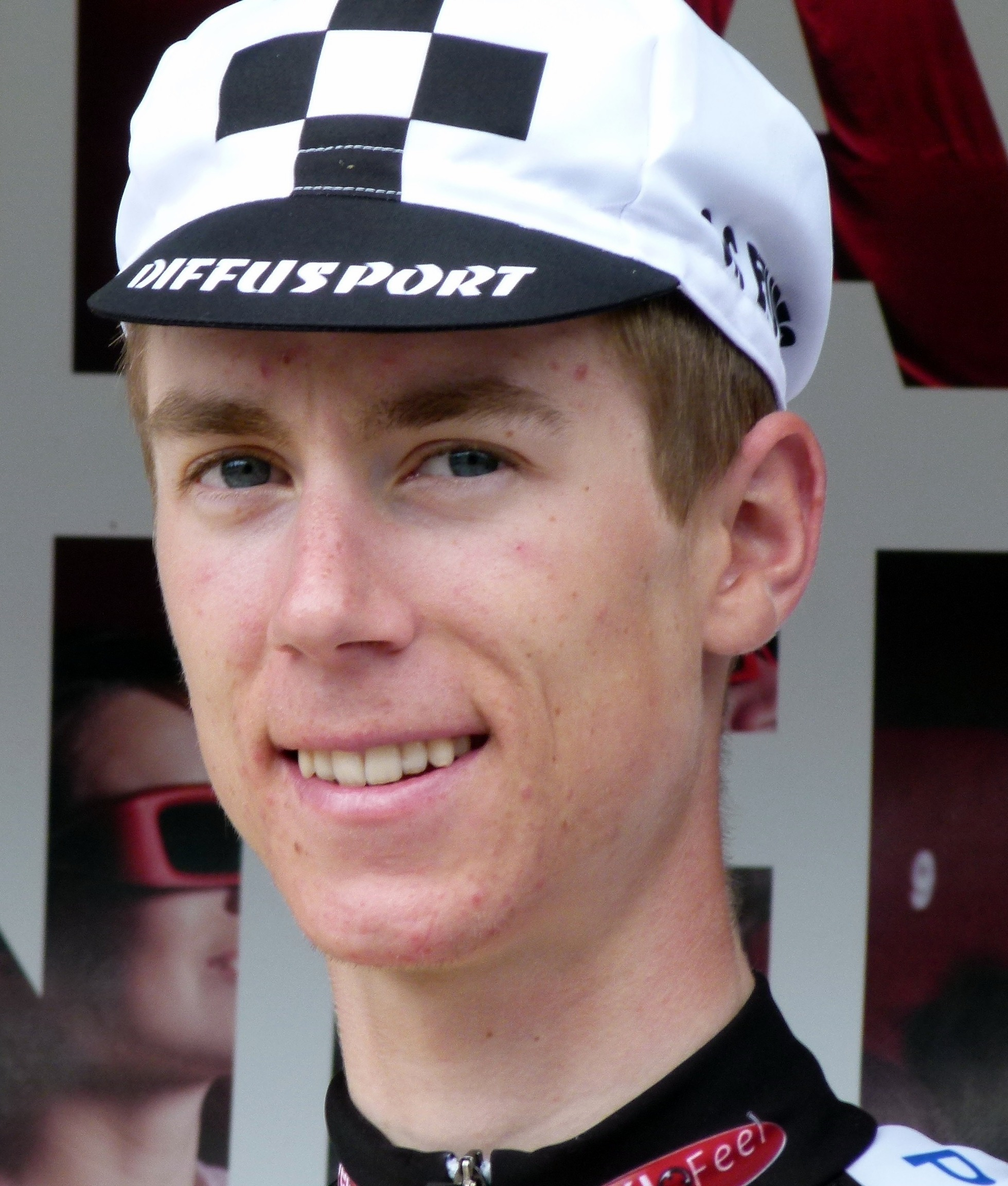
- Maison in 2014.

Personal information
- Full name: Jérémy Maison
- Born: 21 July 1993 (age 33) Auxerre, France
- Height: 1.80 m (5 ft 11 in)
- Weight: 61 kg (134 lb)

Cycling career
- Sport: Cycling
- Current team: Retired
- Discipline: Road
- Role: Rider

Amateur teams
- 2007–2014: VC Toucy
- 2015: CC Étupes

Professional teams
- 2016–2017: FDJ
- 2018–2019: Fortuneo–Samsic

Jérémy Maison (born 21 July 1993) is a French former professional road cyclist, who competed professionally between 2016 and 2019 for the FDJ and Arkéa–Samsic teams. He was named in the startlist for the 2017 Vuelta a España.

== Major results ==
2014
1st Tour du Lot-et-Garonne
1st Paris–Auxerre
1st Tour de Côte d'Or
8th Paris–Troyes
9th Overall Tour de l'Avenir
2015
1st Stage 4 Tour du Jura
3rd Overall Ronde de l'Isard

1st Stage 2

4th Overall Tour des Pays de Savoie
7th Coppa dei Laghi-Trofeo Almar
2018
3rd Overall Tour de Savoie Mont-Blanc

=== Grand Tour general classification results timeline ===
Grand Tour	2017
Giro d'Italia	—
Tour de France	—
Vuelta a España	63

Legend
—	Did not compete
DNF	Did not finish
