= Arnaud Courteille =

French road cyclist

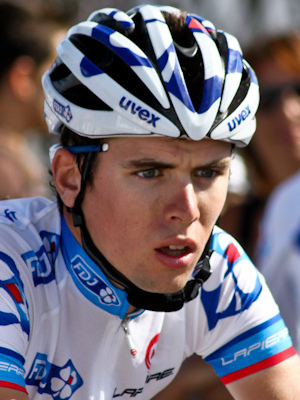
- Courteille at the 2011 Tour de l'Ain

Personal information
- Full name: Arnaud Courteille
- Born: 13 March 1989 (age 37) Saint-Hilaire-du-Harcouët, France
- Height: 1.76 m (5 ft 9 1/2 in)
- Weight: 62 kg (137 lb)

Cycling career
- Sport: Cycling
- Current team: Retired
- Discipline: Road
- Role: Rider
- Rider type: All-rounder

Amateur teams
- 2008–2010: Team UC Nantes Atlantique
- 2009: Française des Jeux (stagiaire)

Professional teams
- 2011–2017: FDJ
- 2018–2020: Vital Concept

Arnaud Courteille (born 13 March 1989) is a French former professional road cyclist, who rode professionally between 2011 and 2020, for the FDJ and B&B Hotels–Vital Concept teams.

== Major results ==
2007
1st Overall Ronde des Vallées

1st Stage 1a (ITT)

2008
1st Road race, National Under-23 Road Championships
2010
4th Overall Coupe des nations Ville Saguenay
10th Overall Grand Prix du Portugal

1st Stage 2

2011
10th Overall Thüringen Rundfahrt der U23
2012
1st Mountains classification Circuit de la Sarthe
2014
9th Cholet-Pays de Loire
10th Polynormande
2018
9th Overall Tour de Savoie Mont-Blanc
2019
1st Mountains classification Tour de Yorkshire

=== Grand Tour general classification results timeline ===
Grand Tour	2012	2013	2014	2015	2016	2017
Giro d'Italia	—	—	DNF	124	136	—
Tour de France	Did not contest during his career					
Vuelta a España	154	132	—	DNF	—	103

Legend
—	Did not compete
DNF	Did not finish
