= Michael Schwarzmann =

German cyclist (born 1991)

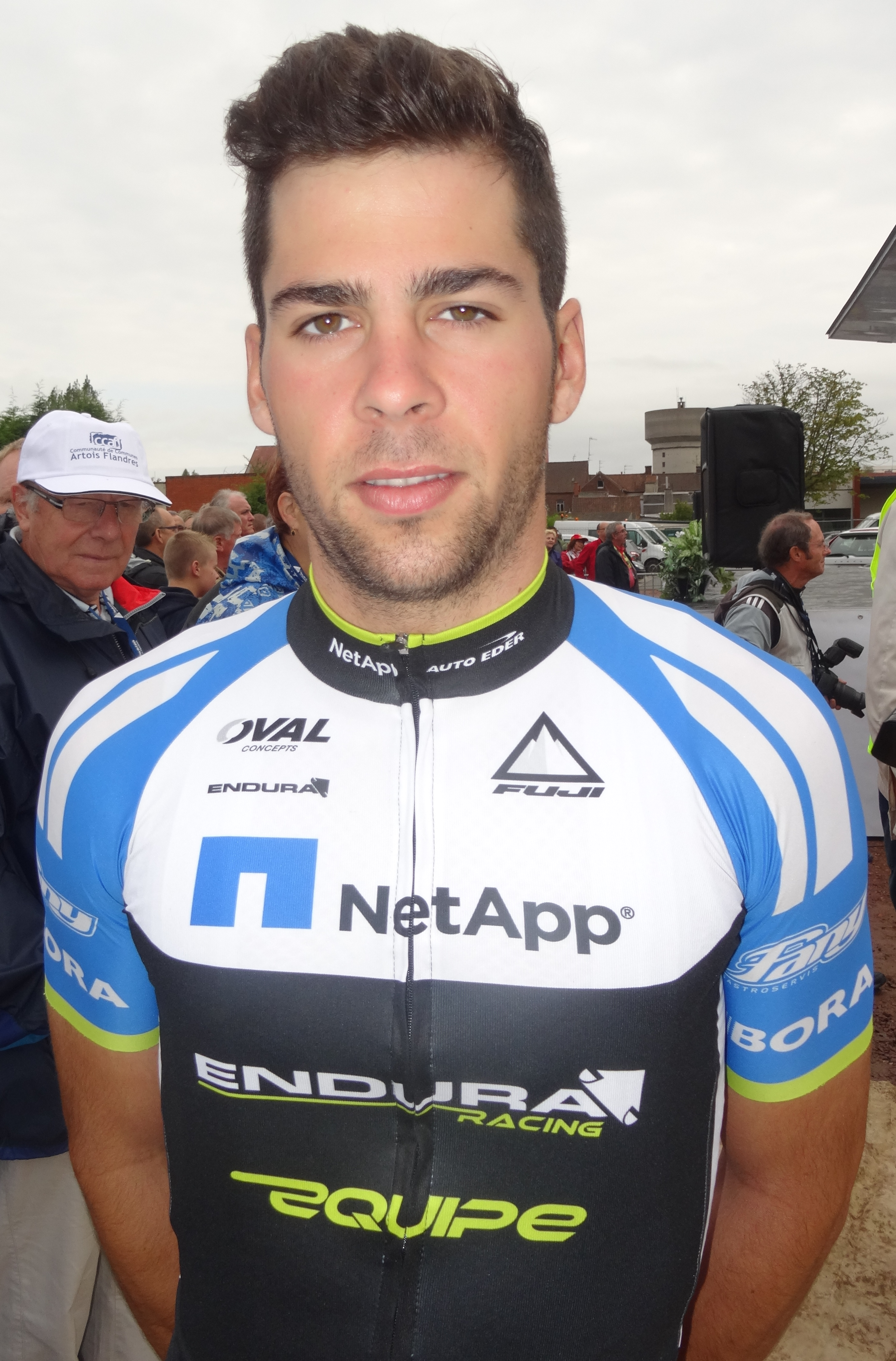
- Schwarzmann in 2014.

Personal information
- Full name: Michael Schwarzmann
- Born: 7 January 1991 (age 35) Kempten, Bavaria, Germany
- Height: 1.74 m (5 ft 9 in)
- Weight: 69 kg (152 lb)

Cycling career
- Sport: Cycling
- Current team: NSN Cycling Team
- Discipline: Road
- Role: Rider
- Rider type: Sprinter

Professional teams
- 2010–2021: Team NetApp
- 2022–2023: Lotto–Soudal
- 2024–: Israel–Premier Tech

Michael Schwarzmann (born 7 January 1991 in Kempten) is a German cyclist, who currently rides for UCI ProTeam NSN Cycling Team. He was named in the start list for the 2016 Vuelta a España. In May 2019, he was named in the startlist for the 2019 Giro d'Italia.

== Major results ==
2009
1st Stage 4 Regio-Tour Juniors
2016 (1 pro win)
1st Stage 5 Tour d'Azerbaïdjan
2019
4th Grand Prix of Aargau Canton
2020
10th Druivenkoers Overijse

=== Grand Tour general classification results timeline ===
Grand Tour	2016	2017	2018	2019	2020	2021	2022
Giro d'Italia	—	—	—	114	—	—	133
Tour de France	—	—	—	—	—	—	—
Vuelta a España	157	154	150	—	122	—	—

Legend
—	Did not compete
DNF	Did not finish
