= Combination classification in the Vuelta a España =

Secondary classification in the Spanish cycling grand tour

White jersey
- Sport: Road Cycling
- Competition: Vuelta a España
- Awarded for: Winner combination classification
- Local name: Jersey Blanco (Spain)

History
- First award: 1970
- Editions: 31 (as of 2018)
- Final award: 2018
- First winner: Guido Reybrouck (BEL)
- Most wins: Alejandro Valverde (ESP) (3 wins)
- Most recent: Simon Yates (GBR)

The combination classification was one of the primary awards in the Vuelta a España cycling stage race. This classification was calculated by adding the numeral ranks of each cyclist in the general, points, and mountains classifications (a rider must have had a score in all classifications possible to qualify for the combination classification), with the lowest cumulative total signifying the leader of this competition.

From 2006 to 2018, the leader of the classification wore a white jersey; in 2005 it was a golden-green jersey.

The award strongly favoured top riders in the competition. Since its re-introduction in 2002, it was only won by someone other than the race's overall winner four times: in 2002, 2003, 2012, and 2015. On all four of those occasions, the winning cyclist was placed either second or third in the overall classification.

The combination classification was discontinued in 2019. Now, the white jersey is worn by the best young rider.

The Vuelta was the last major race to feature a combination classification.

== Winners ==
- 1970 Guido Reybrouck (BEL)
- 1971 Cyrille Guimard (FRA)
- 1972 José Manuel Fuente (ESP)
- 1973 Eddy Merckx (BEL)
- 1974 José Luis Abilleira (ESP)
- 1985 Robert Millar (GBR)
- 1986 Sean Kelly (IRL)
- 1987 Laurent Fignon (FRA)
- 1988 Sean Kelly (IRL)
- 1989 Oscar Vargas (COL)
- 1990 Federico Echave (ESP)
- 1991 Federico Echave (ESP)
- 1992 Tony Rominger (SUI)
- 1993 Jesús Montoya (ESP)
- 2002 Roberto Heras (ESP)
- 2003 Alejandro Valverde (ESP)
- 2004 Roberto Heras (ESP)
- 2005 Denis Menchov (RUS)
- 2006 Alexander Vinokourov (KAZ)
- 2007 Denis Menchov (RUS)
- 2008 Alberto Contador (ESP)
- 2009 Alejandro Valverde (ESP)
- 2010 Vincenzo Nibali (ITA)
- 2011 Chris Froome (GBR)
- 2012 Alejandro Valverde (ESP)
- 2013 Chris Horner (USA)
- 2014 Alberto Contador (ESP)
- 2015 Joaquim Rodríguez (ESP)
- 2016 Nairo Quintana (COL)
- 2017 Chris Froome (GBR)
- 2018 Simon Yates (GBR)

=== Most wins ===
Rank	Cyclist	Total	Years
1	Alejandro Valverde (ESP)	3	2003, 2009, 2012
2	Alberto Contador (ESP)	2	2008, 2014
2	Federico Echave (ESP)	2	1990, 1991
2	Chris Froome (GBR)	2	2011, 2017
2	Roberto Heras (ESP)	2	2002, 2004
2	Sean Kelly (IRL)	2	1986, 1988
2	Denis Menchov (RUS)	2	2005, 2007
