= Floris De Tier =

Belgian cyclist

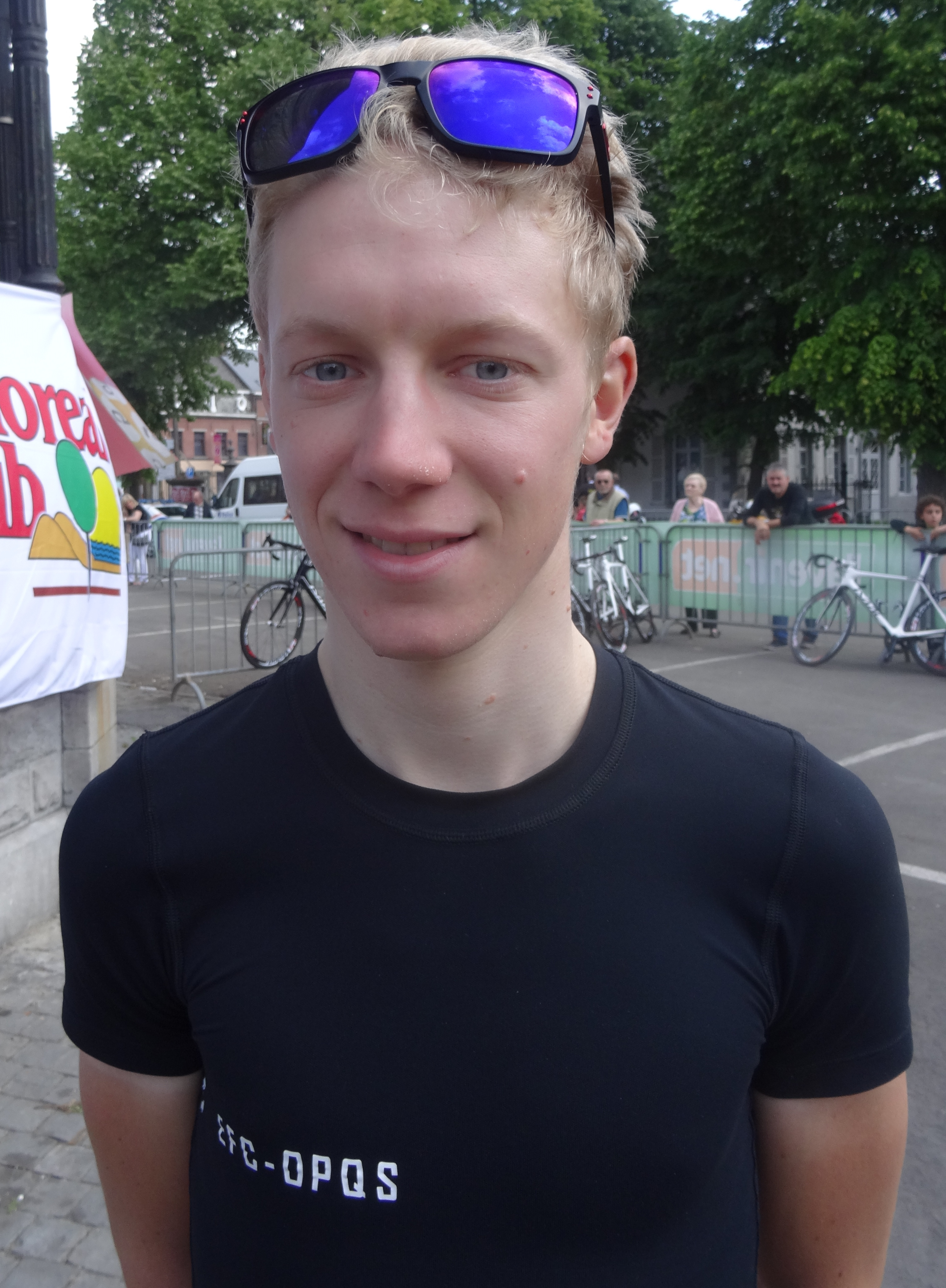
- Floris De Tier in 2014

Personal information
- Born: 20 January 1992 (age 34) Gavere, Belgium
- Height: 1.72 m (5 ft 8 in)
- Weight: 59 kg (130 lb)

Cycling career
- Sport: Cycling
- Current team: Wagner Bazin WB
- Discipline: Road
- Role: Rider

Amateur team
- 2014: EFC–Omega Pharma–Quick-Step

Professional teams
- 2015–2016: Topsport Vlaanderen–Baloise
- 2017–2019: LottoNL–Jumbo
- 2020–2022: Alpecin–Fenix
- 2023–: Bingoal WB

Floris De Tier (born 20 January 1992) is a Belgian professional racing cyclist, who currently rides for UCI ProTeam Wagner Bazin WB. He was named in the startlist for the 2017 Vuelta a España.

== Major results ==
2010
4th Gent–Menen
8th Ronde van Vlaanderen Juniores
2013
5th Paris–Tours Espoirs
9th Grand Prix des Marbriers
2014
3rd Circuit de Wallonie
7th Overall Kreiz Breizh Elites
8th Liège–Bastogne–Liège Espoirs
8th Grand Prix de la Ville de Lillers
9th Ronde Van Vlaanderen Beloften
10th Overall Giro della Valle d'Aosta
2015
9th Vuelta a Murcia
2016
6th Overall Tour de Wallonie
2020
1st Mountains classification, Vuelta a Andalucía
2023
10th Overall Tour of Austria
2024
9th Overall Arctic Race of Norway
10th Giro della Toscana

=== Grand Tour general classification results timeline ===
Grand Tour	2017	2018	2019	2020	2021
Giro d'Italia	—	—	—	—	—
Tour de France	—	—	—	—	—
Vuelta a España	62	41	—	—	48

Legend
—	Did not compete
DNF	Did not finish
