= Paweł Poljański =

Polish racing cyclist

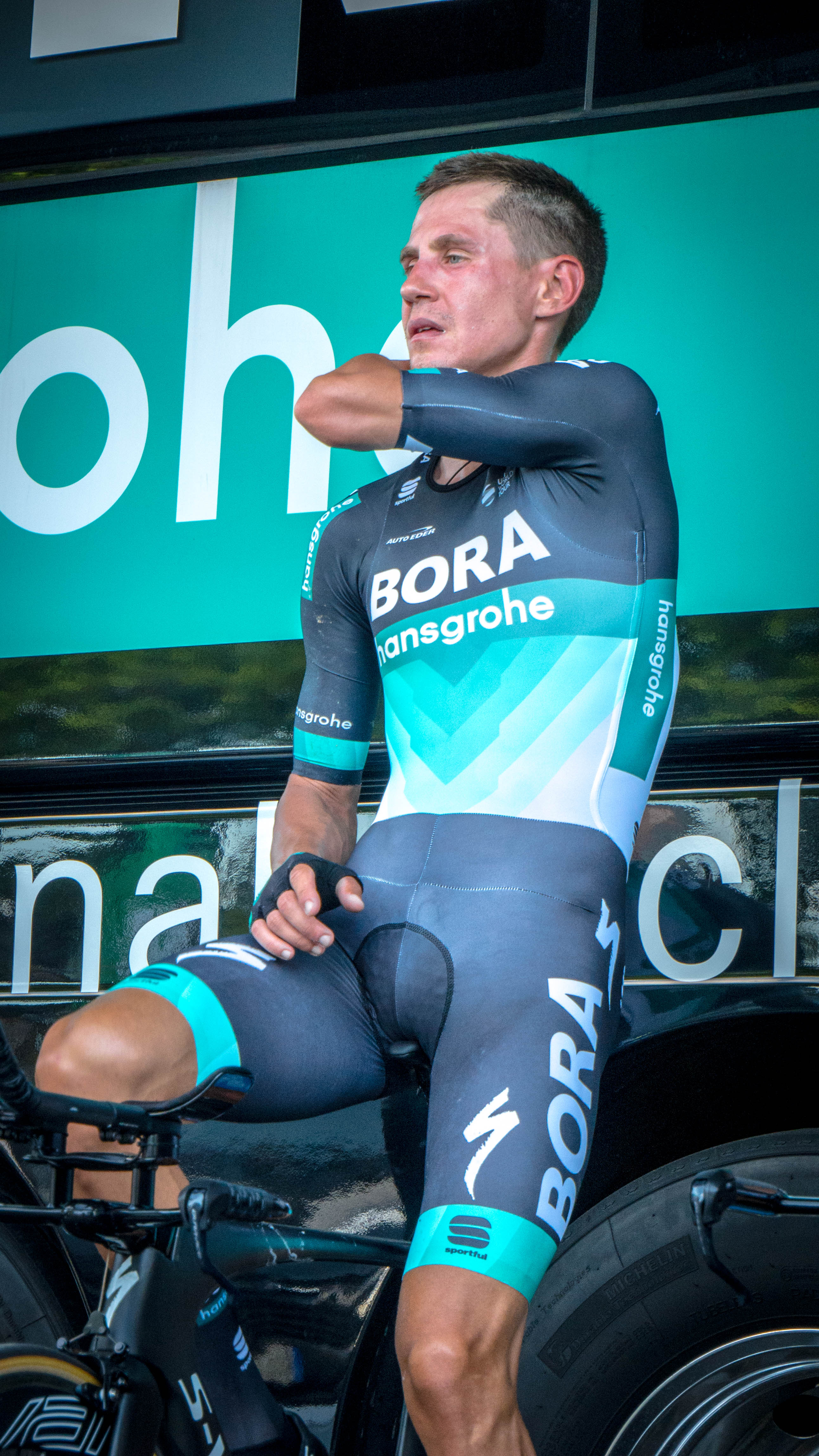
- Poljański at the 2018 Tour de France

Personal information
- Full name: Paweł Poljański
- Born: 6 May 1990 (age 36)

Cycling career
- Sport: Cycling
- Current team: Retired
- Discipline: Road
- Role: Rider
- Rider type: Rouleur

Amateur teams
- 2011: GS Campi Bisenzio
- 2012: Ciclistica Sestese
- 2013: Acqua & Sapone Team Mocaiana
- 2013: Saxo–Tinkoff (stagiaire)

Professional teams
- 2014–2016: Tinkoff–Saxo
- 2017–2020: Bora–Hansgrohe

Major wins
- One-day races and Classics National Under-23 Road Race Championships (2012)

Paweł Poljański (born 6 May 1990) is a Polish former professional racing cyclist, who rode professionally between 2014 and 2020, for the Tinkoff and Bora–Hansgrohe teams. He rode in the 2014 Giro d'Italia. He was named in the start list for the 2015 Vuelta a España. In June 2017, he was named in the startlist for the 2017 Tour de France.

== Major results ==
2008
3rd Overall Giro della Lunigiana

1st Points classification

5th Overall Tour d'Istrie
2011
2nd Overall Carpathia Couriers Paths

1st Stage 3

2012
1st Road race, National Road Championships
2nd Coppa della Pace
2015
9th Overall Tour of Austria
Combativity award Stage 13 Vuelta a España

=== Grand Tour general classification results timeline ===
Grand Tour	2014	2015	2016	2017	2018	2019	2020
Giro d'Italia	50	—	35	—	—	89	67
Tour de France	—	—	—	80	94	—	—
Vuelta a España	—	35	—	67	—	57	—

Legend
—	Did not compete
DNF	Did not finish
