= Colombian National Road Race Championships =

National road cycling championship in Colombia

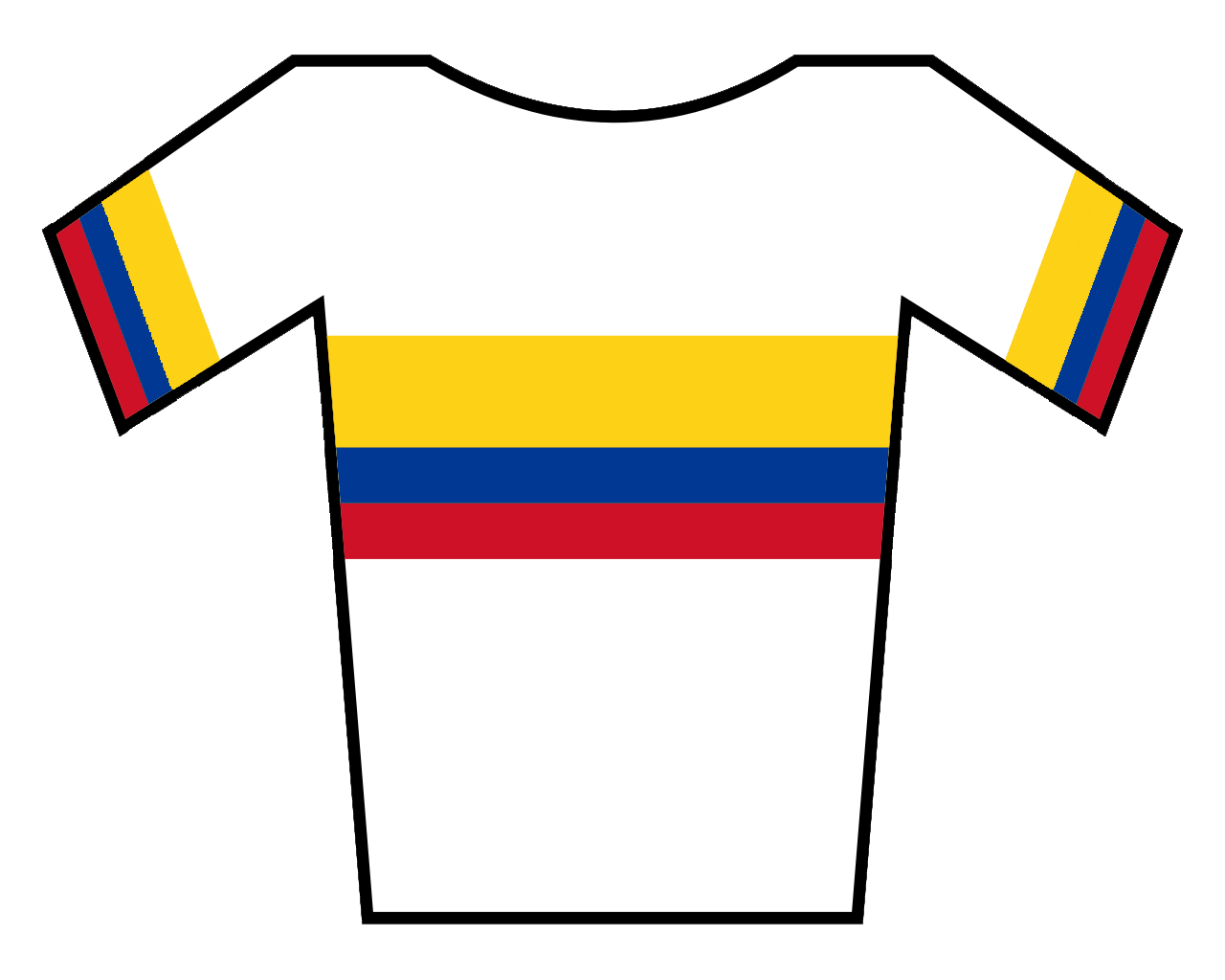
The champion's jersey

The Colombian National Road Race Championship is a road bicycle race that takes place inside the Colombian National Cycling Championship, and decides the best cyclist in this type of race. The first edition took place in 1946. The first race winner of the road race championship was Jaime Gómez. Efraín Forero holds the record for the most wins in the men's championship with 4. Egan Bernal is the current champion.

== Men ==
=== Elite ===
Colombian National Road Race Championships – Men's elite race
Race details
- Region: Colombia
- Discipline: Road bicycle racing
- Type: One-day

History
- First edition: 1946
- First winner: Jaime Gómez
- Most wins: Efraín Forero (4 wins)
- Most recent: Alejandro Osorio

Year	Gold	Silver	Bronze
1946	Jaime Gómez		
1947	Óscar Salinas	Alfonso González	Luis Ortíz
1948	Luis Galo Chiriboga	Óscar Salinas	Benjamín Jiménez
1949	Not held		
1950	Efraín Forero	Efraín Rozo	Gilberto Cuevas
1951	Not held		
1952	Ernesto Gallego	Efraín Forero	Octavio Echeverry
1953	Efraín Forero (2)	Fabio León	Pedro Bernal
1954	Efraín Forero (3)	Benjamín Jiménez	Héctor Mesa
1955	Jorge Luque	Carlos Gil	Efraín Forero
1956	Fabio León Calle	Pablo Hurtado	Jaime Villegas
1957	Hernán Medina	Héctor Mesa Monsalve	Carlos Montoya
1958	Efraín Forero (4)	Diego Calero	Humberto Gravina
1959	Antonio Ambrosio	Octavio Olarte	Rubén Darío Gómez
1960	Aureliano Gallón	Mario Escobar	Hernán Herrón
1961	Mario Escobar	Aureliano Gallón	Hernán Herrón
1962	Antonio Ambrosio (2)	Roberto Buitrago	Martin Emilio Rodríguez
1963	Gabriel Halaixt	Carlos Siabatto	Mario Escobar
1964	Pablo Hernández	Gustavo Rincón	Antonio Forero
1965	Martín Emilio Rodríguez	Pablo Hernández	Severo Hernández
1966	Aníbal Ricardo	Jaime Galeano	Severo Hernández
1967	Luis Alfonso Galvis	Álvaro Pachón	Miguel Samacá
1968	Jairo Grijalba	Miguel Samacá	Luis Hernán Díaz
1969	Augusto Estrada	Álvaro Pachón	Albeiro Mejia
1970	Álvaro Pachón	Rubén Darío Gómez	Carlos Campaña
1971	Abraham Domínguez	Fernando Cruz	Juan de Dios Morales
1972	Arturo Matamoros	Jorge González	Álvaro Pachón
1973	Luis Hernán Díaz	José de Jesús Vargas	Miguel Guerrero
1974	Fabio Navarro	Carlos Campaña	José Patrocinio Jiménez
1975	Hector Julio Mayorga	Óscar Giraldo	Abelardo Ríos
1976	Luis Enrique Murillo	Abelardo Ríos	Jaime Galeano
1977	Abelardo Ríos	Alfonso Flórez Ortiz	Luis Carlos Manrique
1978	Juan de Dios Morales	Luis Carlos Manrique	Jorge González
1979	Julio Alberto Rubiano	Juan de Dios Morales	Luis Carlos Manrique
1980	Not held		
1981	Carlos Mario Jaramillo	Rafael Tolosa	Óscar Iván Carvajal
1982	Germán Marín	José Chalapud	Ángel Ramírez
1983	Álvaro Lozano	Óscar Iván Carvajal	José Plácido Arias
1984	Néstor Mora	Luis Carlos Manrique	José Antonio Agudelo Gómez
1985	Fabio Parra	Reynel Montoya	Jorge León Otalvaro
1986	Antonio Londoño	Israel Corredor	Reynel Montoya
1987	Reynel Montoya	Javier Montoya	Manuel Cárdenas Espitia
1988	Reynel Montoya (2)	Martín Ramírez	Victor Hugo Olarte
1989	Reynel Montoya (3)	Henry Cárdenas	Álvaro Mejía
1990	William Pulido	Óscar Vargas	Álvaro Lozano
1991	Jorge Otálvaro	Juan Carlos Arias	Victor Hugo Olarte
1992	Jorge Otálvaro (2)	Luis Espinosa	Alfonso Alayon
1993	Federico Muñoz	Javier Zapata	Néstor Mora
1994	Luis Alberto González	Javier Zapata	Héctor Palacio
1995	Efraím Rico	Celio Roncancio	Óscar Vargas
1996	Celio Roncancio	Javier Zapata	Álvaro Lozano
1997	José Castelblanco	Raúl Gomez	César Goyeneche
1998	Johny Ruiz	Hernán Darío Muñoz	César Goyeneche
1999	César Goyeneche	Marlon Pérez	Ruber Marín
2000	Héctor Valenzuela	Israel Ochoa	Álvaro Lozano
2001	Daniel Rincón	Ismael Sarmiento	Alejandro Cortés
2002	Jhon García	John Parra	Elder Herrera
2003	Elder Herrera	Hugo Osorio	Heberth Gutiérrez
2004	Israel Ochoa	Graciano Fonseca	Oved Ramírez
2005	Walter Pedraza	Heberth Gutiérrez	Luis Felipe Laverde
2006	Alejandro Cortés	Iván Casas	John Garcia
2007	Fidel Chacón	John Parra	Andrés Díaz
2008	Darwin Atapuma	Israel Ochoa	Walter Pedraza
2009	Oscar Álvarez	Juan Pablo Wilches	Diego Calderón
2010	Félix Cárdenas	Edson Calderón	Edwar Ortiz
2011	Weimar Roldán	Carlos Ospina	Jeyson Ulloa
2012	Félix Cárdenas (2)	Brayan Ramírez	Darwin Atapuma
2013	Walter Pedraza	Jonathan Paredes	Andrés Díaz
2014	Miguel Ángel Rubiano	Winner Anacona	Juan Pablo Suárez
2015	Robinson Chalapud	Daniel Jaramillo	Jeffry Romero
2016	Edwin Ávila	Sergio Henao	Cayetano Sarmiento
2017	Sergio Henao	Jarlinson Pantano	Óscar Quiroz
2018	Sergio Henao (2)	Óscar Quiroz	Diego Ochoa
2019	Óscar Quiroz	Juan Felipe Osorio	José Serpa
2020	Sergio Higuita	Egan Bernal	Daniel Martínez
2021	Aristóbulo Cala	Marco Tulio Suesca	Luis Miguel Martínez
2022	Sergio Higuita (2)	Yeison Rincón	Esteban Chaves
2023	Esteban Chaves	Daniel Martínez	Nairo Quintana
2024	Alejandro Osorio	Sergio Higuita	Egan Bernal

=== Under 23 ===
Year	Gold	Silver	Bronze
2003	Juan Carlos López	Ferney Bello	Deiby Ibáñez
2004			
2005	Juan Pablo Forero	Andrés Díaz	Julián Atehortúa
2006	Jaime Castañeda	Andrés Díaz	Fabio Duarte
2007	Juan Sebastián Arango	Hernán Vargas	Camillo Torres
2008			
2009	Jaime Vergara	Cayetano Sarmiento	Jaime Morales
2010	Juan Pablo Valencia	Jonathan Millán	Aristobulo Cala
2011	Marvin Angarita	Cristian Talero	Brayan Ramírez
2012			
2013	Rónald Gómez	Julian Marin	Daniel Jaramillo
2014	Diego Ochoa	Brayan Ramírez	Hernando Bohórquez
2015	Edwar Díaz	Jordan Parra	Andrés Felipe Herrera
2016	Roller Diagama	Edwar Díaz	Wilmar Castro
2017	Robinson López	Cristian Carmona	Jonathan Cañaveral
2018	Yeison Rincón	Hernán Darío Gómez	Daniel Largo
2019	Harold Tejada	Jhojan García	Santiago Ordoñez
2020	Daniel Arroyave	Óscar Leonardo Guzmán	Cristian David Rico
2021	Juan Esteban Guerrero	Heberth Alejandro Gutiérrez Rendón	Elkin Steven Malaver

== Women ==
=== Elite ===
Colombian National Road Race Championships – Women's elite race
Race details
- Region: Colombia
- Discipline: Road bicycle racing
- Type: One-day

History
- First edition: 1987
- First winner: Adriana Muriel
- Most wins: Adriana Muriel (5 wins)
- Most recent: Diana Peñuela

Year	Gold	Silver	Bronze
1987	Adriana Muriel	Luz Stella Araque	Rosa María Aponte
1988	Adriana Muriel	Doris Patricia Fonseca	Marta Luz López
1989	Adriana Muriel	Rosa Angélica Maya	Ángela Gómez
1990	Adriana Muriel	Nelly Alba Amado	Rosa María Aponte
1991	Adriana Muriel	Analida Cartagena	Rosa Angélica Maya
1992–1997	Not held		
1998	Ana-M. Betancourt	Nohora Lopez	Analida Cartagena
1999	María Luisa Calle	Sandra Gómez	Paola Madriñan
2000	Not held		
2001	Flor Marina Delgadillo	Martha López	Magda Cubides
2002	Nancy Casallas	Flor Marina Delgadillo	Paola Madriñan
2003	Paola Madriñan	Flor Marina Delgadillo	Millerlandy Agudelo
2004	Paola Madriñan	Mónica Méndez	Marcela Cadena
2005	Sandra Gómez		
2006	Magdaly Trujillo	Laura Lozano	Monica Mendez
2007	Sandra Gómez	María Luisa Calle	Magdaly Trujillo
2008	Paola Madriñan	Lorena Vargas	Flor Delgadillo
2009	Daniela Salazar	Lorena Vargas	Laura Lozano
2010	Viviana Velásquez	Ana Sanabria	Laura Lozano
2011	Viviana Velásquez	Jenny Colmenares	Maritza Ceballos
2012	Lorena Vargas	Henny Rubio	Ana Sanabria
2013	Lorena Vargas	Andreina Rivera	Claudia Castaño
2014	Valentina Paniagua	Diana Peñuela	Laura Lozano
2015	Leidy Natalia Muñoz Ruiz	Diana Peñuela	Ana Christina Sanabria
2016	Luz Adriana Tovar	Blanca Liliana Moreno	Laura Camila Lozano
2017	Luisa Naranjo	Diana Peñuela	Lorena Vargas
2018	Kathrin Montoya	Milena Salcedo	Laura Camila Lozano
2019	Blanca Liliana Moreno	Jessica Parra	Estefania Herrera
2020	Maria Catalina Gomez	Jeniffer Alejandra Medellin	Jeimy Beltran
2021	Lorena Colmenares	Paula Patiño	Diana Peñuela
2022	Diana Peñuela	Lorena Colmenares	Andrea Alzate

=== Under 23 ===
Year	Gold	Silver	Bronze
2020	Lina Hernández	Leidy Lopez	Daniela Atehortua
