= Vuelta de la Juventud de Colombia =

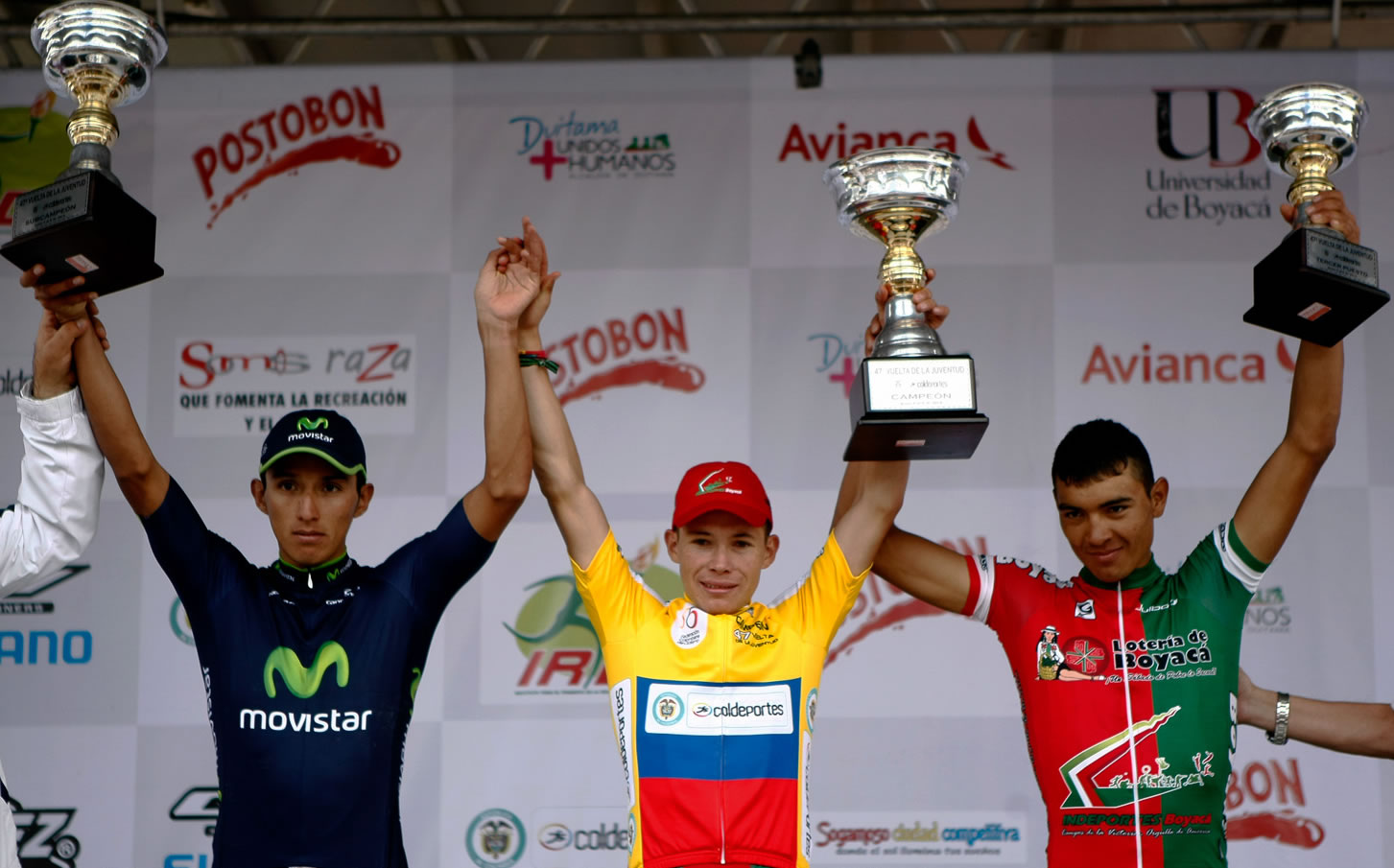
- Podium of the 2014 edition

Race details
- Date: May
- Region: Colombia
- English name: Under-23 Tour of Colombia
- Discipline: Road
- Type: Stage race
- Organiser: Colombian Cycling Federation

History
- First edition: 1968
- Editions: 56 (as of 2023)
- First winner: Manuel Puerto (COL)
- Most wins: Fabio Duarte (COL); Mauricio Ardila (COL); Jesús David Peña (COL); Germán Darío Gómez (COL); (2 wins)
- Most recent: Germán Darío Gómez (COL)

The Vuelta de la Juventud de Colombia is a road cycling race held annually since 1968 throughout Colombia. It is considered to be the under-23 version of the Vuelta a Colombia. Many successful professional cyclists won the race early in their careers, including Rafael Antonio Niño, Fabio Parra, Oliverio Rincón, Marlon Pérez, Mauricio Soler, Fabio Duarte, Sergio Henao, Carlos Betancur, Miguel Ángel López and Richard Carapaz.

== Winners ==
=== Men ===
Year	Winner	Second	Third
1968	(Colombia) Manuel Puerto	(Colombia) Augusto Estrada	(Colombia) Luis Reategui
1969	(Colombia) Alberto Duarte	(Colombia) Ramiro Tangarife	(Colombia) Carlos Zapata
1970	(Colombia) Rafael Antonio Niño	(Colombia) Pedro Rodas	(Colombia) Juan de Dios Morales
1971	(Colombia) Jorge Correa	(Colombia) Wilfredo Insuasty	(Colombia) Carlos Campaña
1972	(Colombia) Efraín Pulido	Not awarded	(Colombia) Guillermo Mejía
1973	(Colombia) Guillermo León Mejía	(Colombia) Hugo Hernández	(Colombia) José Vargas
1974	(Colombia) Julio Alberto Rubiano	(Colombia) Hugo Hernández	(Colombia) Segundo Gomajoa
1975	(Colombia) Manuel Ignacio Gutiérrez	(Colombia) Juan Pachón	(Colombia) José López
1976	(Colombia) Faustino Cristancho	(Colombia) Rafael Acevedo	(Colombia) Jorge Figueroa
1977	(Colombia) Orlando Figueroa	(Colombia) William Cañón	(Colombia) Rafael Acevedo
1978	(Colombia) Rafael Tolosa	(Colombia) Fabio Parra	(Colombia) Fabio Casas
1979	(Colombia) Fabio Parra	(Colombia) Carlos Gutiérrez	(Colombia) Héctor Orozco
1980	(Colombia) Martín Ramírez	(Colombia) Samuel Cabrera	(Colombia) Israel Corredor
1981	(Colombia) Gerardo Moncada	(Colombia) Omar Hernández	(Colombia) Marco León
1982	(Colombia) Néstor Mora	(Colombia) Nilton Ortiz	(Colombia) José Vicente Díaz
1983	(Colombia) Eduardo Acevedo	(Colombia) Álvaro Lozano	(Colombia) Abelardo Rondón
1984	(Colombia) Juan Carlos Castillo	(Colombia) Henry Cárdenas	(Colombia) Luis Alberto González
1985	(Colombia) William Palacio	(Colombia) Luis Alberto González	(Colombia) Alberto Camargo
1986	(Colombia) José Vicente Díaz	(Colombia) Josué López	(Colombia) Héctor Castaño
1987	(Colombia) Josué López	(Colombia) José Martín Farfán	(Colombia) Luis Saavedra
1988	(Colombia) Álvaro Mejía	(Colombia) Oliverio Rincón	(Colombia) Hernán Buenahora
1989	(Colombia) Oliverio Rincón	(Colombia) Augusto Triana	(Colombia) Jairo Obando
1990	(Colombia) Édgar Humberto Ruiz	(Colombia) Rúber Marín	(Colombia) José Ibáñez
1991	(Colombia) Omar Trompa	(Colombia) Argiro Zapata	(Colombia) Juan Carlos Vargas
1992	(Colombia) Raúl Montaña	(Colombia) Argiro Zapata	(Colombia) Juan Diego Ramírez
1993	(Colombia) Jairo Hernández	(Colombia) Freddy Moncada	(Colombia) Ramón García
1994	(Colombia) Freddy Moncada	(Colombia) Giovanny Huertas	(Colombia) Carlos Contreras
1995	(Colombia) Iván Parra	(Colombia) Hernán Darío Bonilla	(Colombia) César Goyeneche
1996	(Colombia) Víctor Hugo Peña	(Colombia) Oved Yesid Ramírez	(Colombia) César Goyeneche
1997	(Colombia) Iván Parra	(Colombia) Marlon Pérez	(Colombia) Daniel Rincón
1998	(Colombia) Marlon Pérez	(Colombia) Luis Orán Castañeda	(Colombia) Edilberto Suárez
1999	(Colombia) Mauricio Ardila	(Colombia) Luis Orán Castañeda	(Colombia) Alexánder Giraldo
2000	(Colombia) Mauricio Ardila	(Colombia) Mauricio Ortega	(Colombia) Javier González
2001	(Colombia) Luis Felipe Laverde	(Colombia) Mauricio Henao	(Colombia) Giovanny Chacón
2002	(Colombia) Alejandro Ramírez	(Colombia) Mauricio Soler	(Colombia) Wilson Cepeda
2003	(Colombia) Juan Carlos López	(Colombia) Alejandro Ramírez	(Colombia) Mauricio Soler
2004	(Colombia) Mauricio Soler	(Colombia) Rafael Infantino	(Colombia) Julián Rodas
2005	(Colombia) Fabio Duarte	(Colombia) Edwin Parra	(Colombia) Arley Montoya
2006	(Colombia) Fabio Duarte	(Colombia) Alejandro Serna	(Colombia) Edwin Parra
2007	(Colombia) Óscar Sánchez	(Colombia) Juan Pablo Villegas	(Colombia) Wilson Grisales
2008	(Colombia) Sergio Henao	(Colombia) Fabio Duarte	(Colombia) Cayetano Sarmiento
2009	(Colombia) Carlos Betancur	(Colombia) Edison Mahecha	(Colombia) Ramiro Rincón
2010	(Colombia) Javier Gómez	(Colombia) Edward Beltrán	(Colombia) Daniel Jaramillo
2011	(Colombia) Daniel Jaramillo	(Colombia) Michael Rodríguez	(Colombia) Ronald Gómez
2012	(Colombia) Ronald Gómez	(Colombia) James Jaramillo	(Colombia) Sebastián Henao
2013	(Colombia) César Villegas	(Colombia) Daniel Jaramillo	(Colombia) Sebastián Henao
2014	(Colombia) Miguel Ángel López	(Colombia) Brayan Ramírez	(Colombia) Hernando Bohórquez
2015	(Ecuador) Richard Carapaz	(Colombia) Aldemar Reyes	(Colombia) Jhonatan Restrepo
2016	(Colombia) Diego Cano	(Colombia) Cristian Camilo Muñoz	(Colombia) Hernán Aguirre
2017	(Colombia) Sergio Martínez	(Colombia) Cristian Camilo Muñoz	(Colombia) Germán Chaves
2018	(Colombia) Luis Fernando Jiménez	(Colombia) Alejandro Osorio	(Colombia) Cristian Camilo Muñoz
2019	(Colombia) Jesús David Peña	(Colombia) Adrián Bustamante	(Colombia) Andrés Camilo Ardila
2020	(Colombia) Diego Camargo	(Colombia) Óscar Duvián Gálvis	(Colombia) Germán Darío Gómez
2021	(Colombia) Jesús David Peña	(Colombia) Didier Merchán	(Colombia) Germán Darío Gómez
2022	(Colombia) Germán Darío Gómez	(Colombia) Juan Tito Rendón	(Colombia) Frank Flórez
2023	(Colombia) Germán Darío Gómez	(Colombia) Cristián David Rico	(Colombia) Jhonatán Chaves
