= Diego Camargo =

Colombian cyclist

Personal information
- Full name: Diego Andrés Camargo Pineda
- Born: 3 May 1998 (age 28) Tuta, Boyacá, Colombia
- Height: 1.76 m (5 ft 9 in)
- Weight: 65 kg (143 lb)

Cycling career
- Sport: Cycling
- Current team: Team Medellín–EPM
- Discipline: Road
- Role: Rider

Professional teams
- 2018–2019: Coldeportes–Zenú–Sello Rojo
- 2020: Colombia Tierra de Atletas–GW Bicicletas
- 2021–2023: EF Education–Nippo
- 2024: Petrolike
- 2025–: Team Medellín–EPM

Diego Andrés Camargo Pineda (born 3 May 1998 in Tuta, Boyacá) is a Colombian professional road racing cyclist, who currently rides for UCI Continental team Team Medellín–EPM.

== Major results ==
2020
1st Overall Vuelta a Colombia

1st Young rider classification

1st Overall Vuelta de la Juventud de Colombia
2021
2nd Time trial, National Road Championships
2022
3rd Time trial, National Road Championships
2023
3rd Time trial, National Road Championships
9th Mont Ventoux Dénivelé Challenge
2024
2nd Overall Vuelta a Colombia
6th Overall Volta a Portugal
2025
1st Overall Tour de Beauce

1st Stage 3

1st Overall Tour de Santa Catarina

1st Stage 1

1st Overall Clásico RCN

1st Stage 6

2nd Road race, National Road Championships
2nd Overall Vuelta a Colombia

1st Mountains classification
1st Points classification
1st Stages 4 & 9

2nd Overall Vuelta a Boyacá
3rd Overall Vuelta Bantrab
2026
1st Overall Vuelta a Colombia

1st Stage 5

1st Stage 1 (TTT) Clásica de Rionegro
2nd Overall Tour de Beauce

1st Stage 3

3rd Overall Tour of the Gila
3rd Overall Vuelta al Tolima

=== Grand Tour general classification results timeline ===
Grand Tour	2021	2022	2023
Giro d'Italia	—	79	—
Tour de France	—	—	—
Vuelta a España	53	—	84

Legend
—	Did not compete
DNF	Did not finish
