= Germán Darío Gómez =

Colombian cyclist

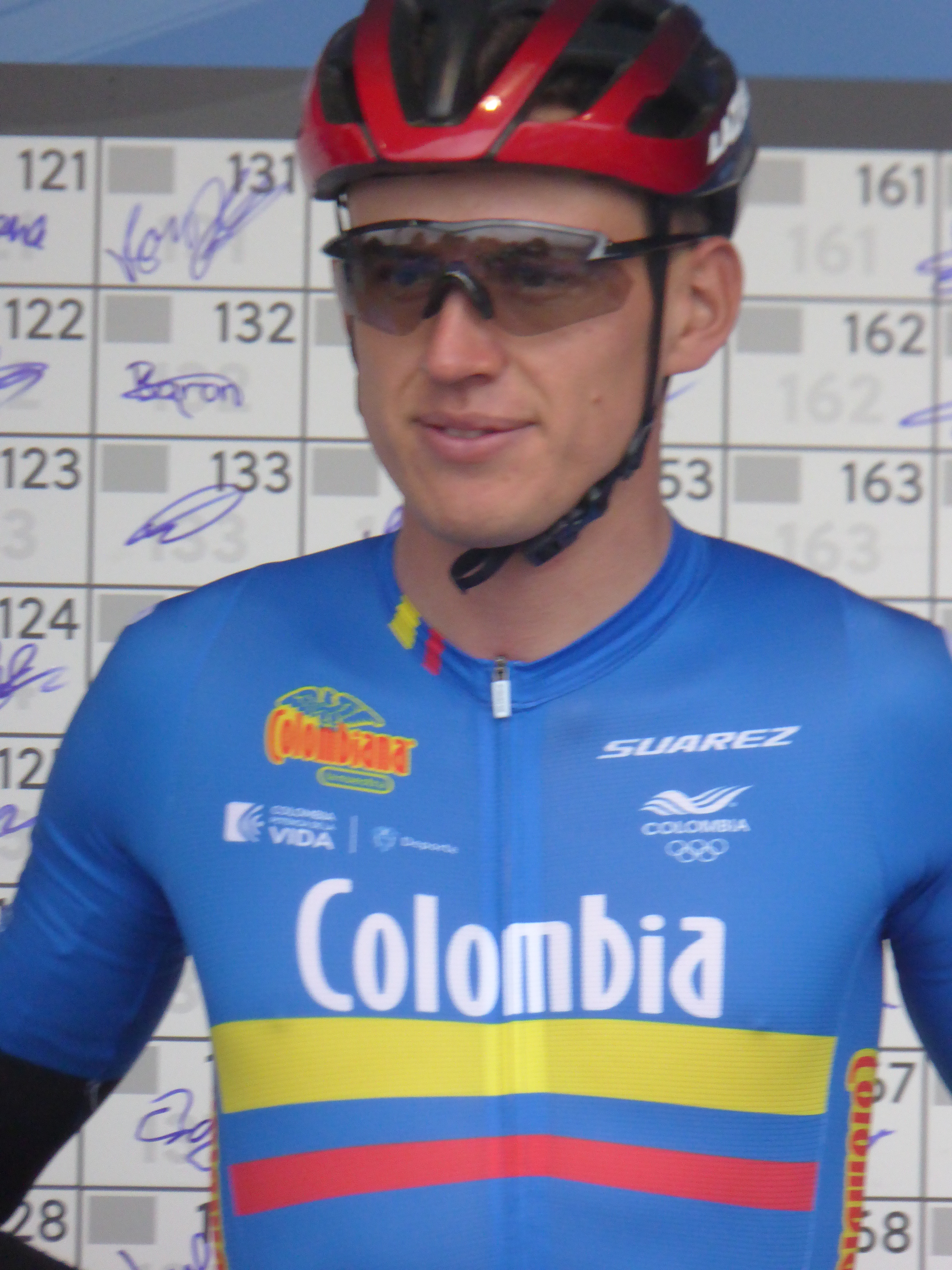
- Gómez in 2023

Personal information
- Full name: Germán Darío Gómez Becerra
- Born: 8 March 2001 (age 25) Betulia, Santander, Colombia
- Height: 1.76 m (5 ft 9 in)
- Weight: 65 kg (143 lb)

Cycling career
- Sport: Cycling
- Current team: Team Polti VisitMalta
- Discipline: Road
- Role: Rider

Amateur team
- 2020–2021: UAE Team Colombia

Professional teams
- 2022: Colombia Tierra de Atletas–GW Shimano
- 2023: GW Shimano–Sidermec
- 2024–: Polti–Kometa
Medal record
Representing Colombia
Men's road cycling
Junior Pan American Games
Bronze medal – third place	2021 Cali-Valle	Road race

Germán Dário Gómez Becerra (born 8 March 2001) is a Colombian professional road racing cyclist, who currently rides for UCI ProTeam Team Polti VisitMalta.

== Major results ==
2018
Pan American Junior Road Championships

2nd Time trial
9th Road race

2019
1st Time trial, Pan American Junior Road Championships
1st Time trial, National Junior Road Championships
3rd Overall Vuelta del Porvenir de Colombia
2020
3rd Overall Vuelta de la Juventud de Colombia
2021
3rd Overall Vuelta de la Juventud de Colombia

1st Stage 4

Junior Pan American Games

3rd Road race
5th Time trial

2022
National Under-23 Road Championships

1st Road race
4th Time trial

1st Overall Vuelta de la Juventud de Colombia
3rd Trofeo Città di San Vendemiano
3rd Trofeo Piva
8th G.P. Palio del Recioto
9th Giro del Belvedere
2023
National Under-23 Road Championships

1st Time trial
4th Road race

1st Overall Vuelta de la Juventud de Colombia

1st Stage 2 (ITT)

4th Overall Giro Next Gen
4th Overall Clásico RCN

1st Stage 2

7th Time trial, Pan American Under-23 Road Championships
2024
6th Overall Tour du Rwanda
2025
6th Overall Tour of Turkey
10th Mercan'Tour Classic
