= Reynel Montoya =

Colombian cyclist

Personal information
- Full name: Jose Reynel Montoya Jaramillo
- Born: November 19, 1959 (age 66) San Vicente, Antioquia, Colombia

Cycling career
- Sport: Cycling
- Current team: Retired
- Discipline: Road
- Role: Rider

Amateur teams
- 1983: Canadá Dry
- 1984: Leche La Gran Vía

Professional teams
- 1985: Varta–Café de Colombia–Mavic
- 1986: Postobón–Manzana
- 1987–1988: Pony Malta–Bavaria
- 1989–1991: Postobón–Manzana

Reynel Montoya Jaramillo (born 19 November 1959) is a Colombian former professional road cyclist.

== Major results ==
1982
1st Young rider classification Vuelta a Colombia
1983
1st Overall Vuelta a Antioquia
1st Stage 2 (TTT) Vuelta a Colombia
1st Stage 2a (TTT) Clásico RCN
1984
1st Mountains classification, Tour de l'Avenir
4th Overall Vuelta a Colombia

1st Stage 4 (TTT)

1986
1st Overall Vuelta a Antioquia
5th Overall Clásico RCN
10th Overall Vuelta a Colombia

1st Stage 2a (TTT)

1987
1st Road race, National Road Championships
1st Overall Vuelta a Antioquia
1st Overall Vuelta a Cundinamarca
6th Overall Vuelta a Colombia

1st Points classification
1st Mountains classification
1st Combined classification

1988
1st Road race, National Road Championships
7th Overall Vuelta a Colombia
1989
1st Road race, National Road Championships
3rd Overall Route du Sud
3rd Overall Vuelta a Colombia

1st Points classification
1st Stages 3 & 5

7th Overall Clásico RCN

1st Stages 1, 4 & 7

1990
1st Overall Clásica del Quindio
1st Stage 1 Clásico RCN

=== Grand Tour general classification results timeline ===
Grand Tour	1985	1986	1987	1988	1989	1990	1991
Giro d'Italia	45	—	—	—	—	—	—
Tour de France	41	15	—	—	—	37	58
Vuelta a España	—	DNF	—	DNF	—	—	—
