= Sandra Gómez =

Sandra Gómez may refer to:

- Sandra Gómez (cyclist) (born 1971), Colombian cyclist
- Sandra Gómez (motorcycle trials rider) (born 1993), Spanish motorcyclist
- Sandra Gómez Pérez (born 1986), Spanish Paralympic swimmer
- Sandra Gómez (politician) (born 1985), Spanish politician
