= Fabio Duarte =

Colombian cyclist (born 1986)

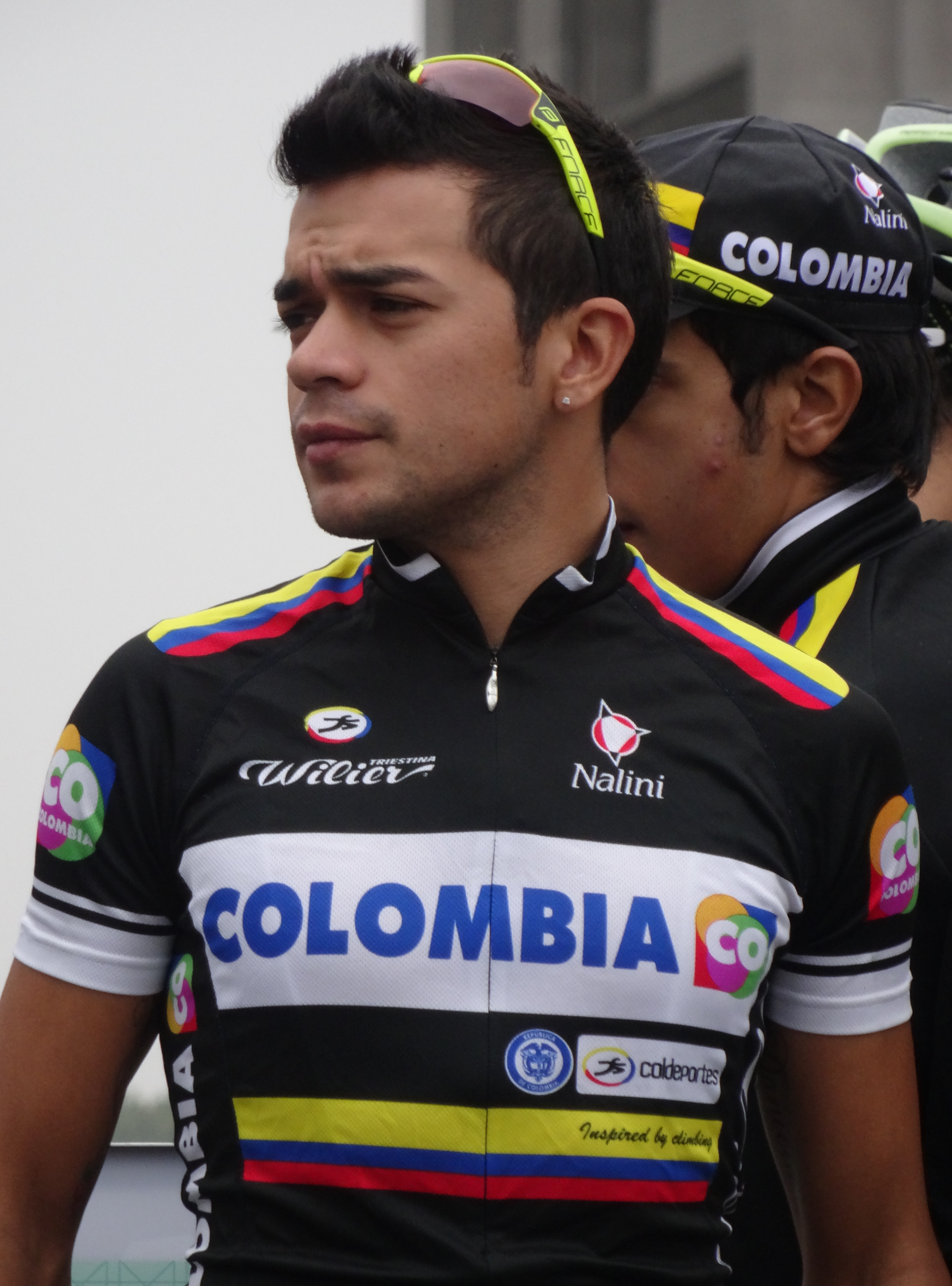
- Duarte at the Brussels Cycling Classic in 2014.

Personal information
- Full name: Fabio Andrés Duarte Arevalo
- Born: 11 June 1986 (age 40) Facatativá, Colombia
- Height: 1.66 m (5 ft 5 in)
- Weight: 55 kg (121 lb; 8.7 st)

Cycling career
- Sport: Cycling
- Current team: Team Medellín–EPM
- Disciplines: Road; Track
- Role: Rider
- Rider type: Climbing specialist

Amateur teams
- 2003–2006: Colombian National Team
- 2006: Orbitel–EPM

Professional teams
- 2007: Diquigiovanni–Selle Italia
- 2008–2010: Colombia es Pasión–Coldeportes
- 2011: Geox–TMC
- 2012–2015: Colombia–Coldeportes
- 2016–2017: EPM–UNE–Área Metropolitana
- 2018: Team Manzana Postobón
- 2019–: Medellín

Major wins
- World Under-23 Road Race Championships (2008)
Medal record
Representing Colombia
Men's road bicycle racing
World Championships
| Gold medal – first place | 2008 Varese | Under-23 road race |

Fabio Andrés Duarte Arevalo (born 11 June 1986 in Facatativá, Cundinamarca) is a Colombian track and road cyclist, who currently rides for UCI Continental team Team Medellín–EPM. He is best known for winning the 2008 World Under-23 Road Race Championships, and has twice finished in second place during Giro d'Italia stages – in 2013, behind Vincenzo Nibali on stage 20 and 2014, behind Julián Arredondo on stage 18.

== Personal life ==
He has a younger brother, Álvaro Duarte, who is also a professional cyclist.

== Major results ==
2003
National Junior Track Championships

1st Individual pursuit
2nd Madison

2005
1st Vuelta a la Sabana
1st Overall Vuelta de la Juventud de Colombia

1st Prologue, Stages 3 & 4

2006
National Under-23 Road Championships

1st Time trial
3rd Road race

1st Overall Clásica Nacional Ciudad de Anapoima

1st Stages 1 & 2

1st Overall Clasica International de Tulcan

1st Prologue

1st Overall Vuelta de la Juventud de Colombia

1st Prologue, Stages 1 & 5

1st Prologue Clásica Nacional Marco Fidel Suárez
4th Overall Vuelta a Colombia

1st Stage 10 (TTT)

2007
1st Stage 12 Vuelta a Colombia
10th Overall Vuelta por un Chile Líder
2008
1st Road race, UCI Under-23 Road World Championships
1st Stage 2 Circuito de Combita
1st Stage 2 Clásica Nacional Ciudad de Anapoima
1st Prologue Vuelta de la Juventud de Colombia
3rd Time trial, National Road Championships
2009
1st Overall Clasica International de Tulcan

1st Stages 2 & 3

1st Overall Tour des Pyrénées

1st Stage 2

1st Stage 3 Vuelta a Colombia
2010
1st Overall Circuito Montañés

1st Stage 4

1st Stage 2 Clásica Nacional Ciudad de Anapoima
Vuelta a Colombia

1st Stages 5 & 12

2nd Overall Vuelta a Asturias

1st Stage 4

3rd Time trial, South American Games
8th Vuelta a La Rioja
2011
2nd Gran Premio di Lugano
4th Overall Vuelta a Murcia
10th Overall Giro del Trentino

1st Stage 3

2012
1st Coppa Sabatini
1st Prologue Vuelta a Colombia
4th Brabantse Pijl
5th Overall Tour of California
2014
4th Overall Giro del Trentino

1st Stage 3

10th Overall Critérium International
2015
1st Mountains classification, Tour de Luxembourg
1st Mountains classification, Vuelta a Burgos
2016
1st Team time trial, National Road Championships
4th Overall Vuelta a Colombia
2017
1st Stage 1 (TTT) Vuelta a Colombia
2018
2nd Overall Vuelta a la Comunidad de Madrid
2019
1st Overall Vuelta a Colombia
1st Overall Vuelta a Cundinamarca

1st Stage 3

1st Stage 1 (TTT) Tour of Qinghai Lake
2020
1st Mountains classification, Tour Colombia
2nd Overall Vuelta del Porvenir San Luis

1st Stage 4

6th Overall Clásico RCN

1st Stage 1 (TTT)

2021
1st Overall Clásico RCN

1st Points classification
1st Stages 1 (TTT) & 9

1st Stages 1 (TTT) & 5 Vuelta a Antioquia
2022
1st Overall Vuelta a Colombia

1st Stage 5

6th Overall Clásico RCN

1st Stage 7

=== Grand Tour general classification results timeline ===
| Grand Tour | 2011 | 2012 | 2013 | 2014 | 2015 |
|---|---|---|---|---|---|
| Giro d'Italia | DNF | — | 28 | 28 | — |
| Tour de France | — | — | — | — | — |
| Vuelta a España | 39 | — | — | — | 67 |

Legend
| — | Did not compete |
| DNF | Did not finish |

=== Other major stage races ===
| Race | 2011 | 2012 | 2013 | 2014 | 2015 | 2016 | 2017 | 2018 |
|---|---|---|---|---|---|---|---|---|
| Paris–Nice | Has not contested during his career | | | | | | | |
| Tirreno–Adriatico | — | 55 | — | — | 112 | — | — | — |
| Volta a Catalunya | — | — | — | — | — | — | — | DNF |
| Tour of the Basque Country | 18 | — | — | — | — | — | — | — |
| Tour de Romandie | Has not contested during his career | | | | | | | |
| Critérium du Dauphiné | Has not contested during his career | | | | | | | |
| Tour de Suisse | Has not contested during his career | | | | | | | |
