= Álvaro Pachón =

Colombian cyclist

Personal information
- Born: 30 November 1945 (age 80) Bogotá, Colombia
- Height: 1.66 m (5 ft 5 in)
- Weight: 70 kg (154 lb)

Cycling career
- Sport: Cycling
- Discipline: Road
- Role: Rider

Álvaro Pachón (born 30 November 1945) is a Colombian former cyclist. He competed at the 1968 Summer Olympics and 1976 Summer Olympics.

== Major results ==
1966
4th Overall Vuelta al Táchira

1st Stage 2

1967
2nd Road race, National Road Championships
3rd Overall Vuelta a Colombia
1968
4th Overall Vuelta a Colombia

1st Stage 10

1969
1st Overall Vuelta al Táchira
1st Overall Clásico RCN
2nd Road race, National Road Championships
6th Overall Vuelta a Colombia

1st Stage 15

1970
1st Road race, National Road Championships
1st Overall Vuelta al Táchira
5th Overall Vuelta a Colombia
1971
1st Overall Vuelta a Colombia

1st Stages 1, 3, 5 & 13

1972
3rd Road race, National Road Championships
1973
3rd Overall Vuelta a Colombia

1st Stage 11

1974
1st Overall Vuelta al Táchira
1st Stages 9 & 12 Vuelta a Colombia
4th Overall Giro Ciclistico d'Italia

1st Stage 8

1976
1st Stages 3 & 8 Vuelta a Colombia
1979
8th Overall Vuelta a Colombia
1980
10th Overall Vuelta a Colombia
