= Gabriel Halaixt =

Colombian road cyclist

Personal information
- Full name: Gabriel Hernán Halaixt Buitrago
- Born: 5 September 1943 (age 83) Barrancabermeja, Santander Department, Colombia

Cycling career
- Sport: Cycling
- Discipline: Road
- Role: Rider

Amateur teams
- 1961: Fósforos Refuegos
- 1962: Carrocerías Antioquia
- 1963–1964: Antioquia–Cuadernos Bolivariano
- 1968: Wrangler Caribú

Gabriel Hernán Halaixt Buitrago (born 5 September 1943) is a Colombian former professional road cyclist.

== Major results ==
1963
1st Road race, National Road Championships
1st Stage 5 Vuelta a Colombia
1964
1st Overall Clásico RCN

1st Mountains classification
1st Stage 2

1st Stages 1 & 12 Vuelta a Colombia
1966
6th Overall Clásico RCN
1968
8th Overall Vuelta al Táchira

1st Sprints classification
1st Stage 5
