= Héctor Mesa =

Colombian road cyclist

Personal information
- Full name: Héctor Mesa Monsalve
- Nicknames: El Negro; El hombre de ébano
- Born: Antioquia Department, Colombia

Cycling career
- Sport: Cycling
- Discipline: Road
- Role: Rider

Héctor Mesa Monsalve was a Colombian road cyclist active during the 1950s.

== Major results ==
1953
3rd Overall Vuelta a Colombia

1st Stage 14

1954
Central American and Caribbean Games

1st Team time trial (with Ramón Hoyos, Justo Londoño and Efraín Forero)
1st Road race

3rd Road race, National Road Championships
3rd Overall Vuelta a Colombia

1st Stages 1 & 12

1956
1st Stage 10 Vuelta a Colombia
1957
2nd Road race, National Road Championships
