= Javier Suárez (cyclist) =

Colombian cyclist

Javier Suarez
Personal information
- Full name: Javier Amado Suárez Cueva
- Nicknames: El Ñato; Pugnose
- Born: 3 November 1943 (age 82) Don Matías, Antioquia, Colombia

Cycling career
- Sport: Cycling
- Discipline: Road
- Role: Rider

Professional teams
- 1962–1964: Tapetes Telaraña
- 1965–1966: Suramericana de Seguros
- 1967: Postre Royal
- 1968–1972: Suramericana de Seguros

Javier Amado Suárez Cueva (born 3 November 1943) is a retired Colombia road racing cyclist. He won the Vuelta a Colombia in 1965 and the Clásico RCN in 1965 and 1966. His nickname was El ñato.

He also competed in the team time trial at the 1964 Summer Olympics in Tokyo as part of the Colombian team.

== Major results ==
1962
3rd Overall Vuelta a Colombia

1st Stage 11

1963
1st Stage 9 Vuelta a Colombia
1964
1st Stage 6 Vuelta a Colombia
1965
1st Overall Vuelta a Colombia

1st Stages 7, 11, 14, 15 & 17

1st Overall Clásico RCN

1st Stage 1

1966
1st Overall Clásico RCN

1st Mountains classification
1st Stage 1

Central American and Caribbean Games

1st Team time trial
2nd Road race

2nd Overall Vuelta a Colombia

1st Stage 14

1967
2nd Overall Vuelta a Colombia

1st Stage 19

1968
1st Stage 3 Clásico RCN
2nd Overall Vuelta a Colombia
