= José Tito Hernández =

Colombian cyclist (born 1994)

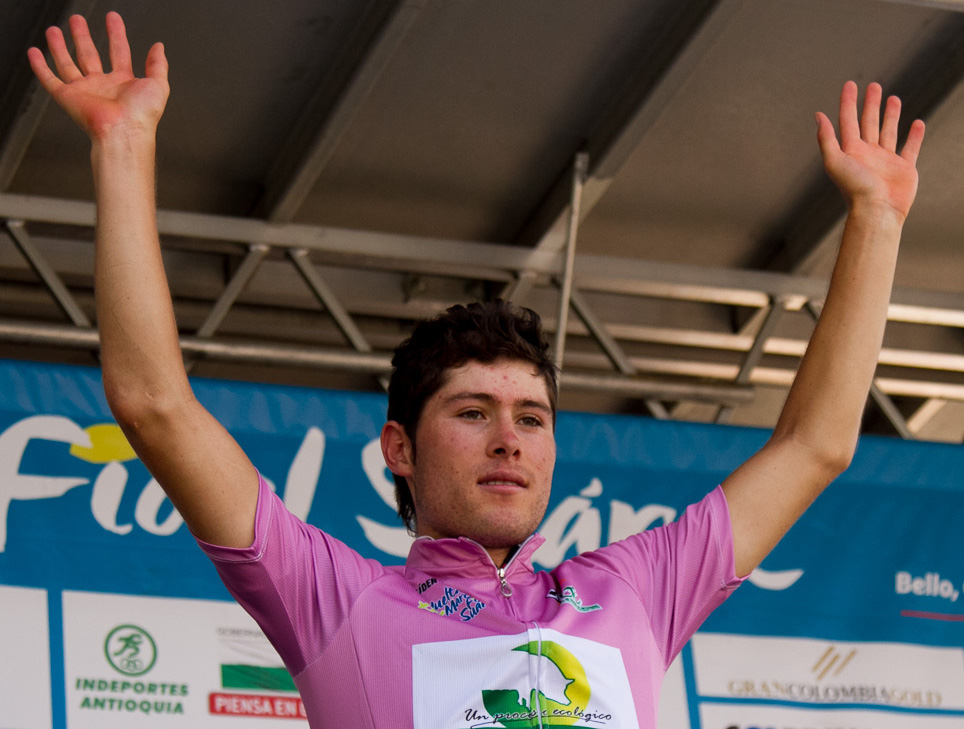
- Hernández in 2016

Personal information
- Full name: José Tito Hernández Jaramillo
- Born: 8 May 1994 (age 32) El Carmen de Viboral, Colombia

Cycling career
- Sport: Cycling
- Current team: Orgullo Paisa
- Discipline: Road
- Role: Rider

Amateur teams
- 2013: GW–Shimano
- 2014: Aguardiente Antioqueño–Lotería de Medellín–IDEA
- 2017: Orgullo Paisa
- 2023: EPM–Scott

Professional teams
- 2015: GM Cycling Team
- 2016: GW–Shimano
- 2018–2019: Orgullo Paisa
- 2020–2021: Team Medellín
- 2022–2023: Team Banco Guayaquil–Ecuador
- 2024–: Orgullo Paisa

José Tito Hernández Jaramillo (born 8 May 1994) is a Colombian road cyclist, who currently rides for UCI Continental team Orgullo Paisa.

== Major results ==
2012
1st Road race, National Junior Road Championships
2015
2nd Coppa della Pace
2018
1st Stage 3 Clásico RCN
2019
1st Clásica de Fusagasugá
2020
1st Overall Clásico RCN

1st Stage 1 (TTT)

1st Gran Premio de la Patagonia
1st Stage 8 Vuelta a Colombia
2021
1st Overall Vuelta a Colombia
