= Jorge Luque (cyclist) =

Colombian cyclist (1936–2024)

Personal information
- Full name: Jorge Alfonso Luque Ballon
- Nicknames: El Águila Negra; El Cóndor de Cundinamarca
- Born: 4 May 1936 Bogotá, Colombia
- Died: 13 June 2024 (aged 88)

Cycling career
- Sport: Cycling
- Discipline: Road
- Role: Rider

Jorge Alfonso Luque Ballon (4 May 1936 – 13 June 2024) was a Colombian cyclist. He competed in the individual and team road race events at the 1956 Summer Olympics. Luque died on 13 June 2024, at the age of 88.

== Major results ==
1955
1st Road race, National Road Championships
1956
2nd Overall Vuelta a Colombia

1st Stage 9

1957
3rd Overall Vuelta a Colombia

1st Mountains classification
1st Stages 4 & 5

1960
1st Overall Vuelta a Guatemala

1st Stage 4

1964
1st Stage 14 Vuelta a Colombia
