= Héctor Valenzuela =

Colombian cyclist

Personal information
- Full name: Héctor Valenzuela
- Born: 18 March 1973 (age 53)

Cycling career
- Sport: Cycling
- Discipline: Road
- Role: Rider

Héctor Valenzuela (born 18 March 1973) is a Colombian former professional racing cyclist. He won the Colombian National Road Race Championships in 2000.
