= Mario Escobar (cyclist) =

Colombian cyclist

Personal information
- Full name: Mario Escobar Gómez
- Born: 14 February 1940 (age 86)

Cycling career
- Sport: Cycling

Major wins
- 1961 Colombian National Road Race Championships

Mario Escobar (born 14 February 1940) is a former Colombian cyclist. He competed in the individual road race at the 1964 Summer Olympics.
