= Ramón Hoyos =

Colombian cyclist (1932–2014)

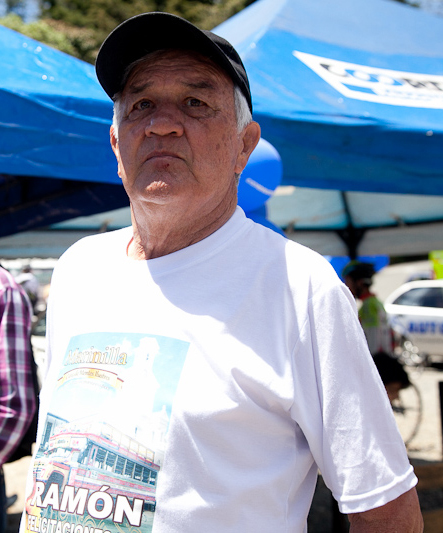

Personal information
- Full name: Ramón Hoyos Vallejo
- Nicknames: El escarabajo de la montaña, Don Ramón de Marinilla
- Born: 26 May 1932 Marinilla, Antioquia, Colombia
- Died: 19 November 2014 (aged 82)
- Height: 1.71 m (5 ft 7 in)
- Weight: 66 kg (146 lb)

Cycling career
- Sport: Cycling
- Discipline: Road
- Role: Rider

Professional team
- Antioquia–Coltejer
Medal record
Men's cycling
Representing Colombia
Pan American Games
Gold medal – first place	1955 Mexico	Individual Road Race

Ramón Hoyos Vallejo (26 May 1932 – 19 November 2014) was a Colombian road bicycle racer who won the men's individual road race at the 1959 Pan American Games. He represented his native country twice at the Summer Olympics; in 1956 and 1960. He also won the Vuelta a Colombia five times: in 1953, 1954, 1955, 1956 and 1958.

== Major results ==
1952
1st Stage 9 Vuelta a Colombia
1953
1st Overall Vuelta a Colombia

1st Stages 4, 5, 6, 7, 10, 11, 12, 15

1954
1st Team time trial, Central American and Caribbean Games (with Héctor Mesa, Justo Londoño and Efraín Forero)
1st Overall Vuelta a Colombia

1st Stages 2, 3, 4, 10, 11, 13

1st Overall Vuelta a Puerto Rico

1st Stages 2 & 5

1955
1st Road race, Pan American Games
1st Overall Vuelta a Colombia

1st Stages 1, 2, 3, 4, 5, 6, 10, 11, 12, 14, 16, 18

1956
1st Overall Vuelta a Colombia

1st Stages 3, 5, 7, 8, 11, 12, 16 & 17

1st Stages 7 & 14 Vuelta a Mexico
1958
1st Overall Vuelta a Colombia

1st Stages 2, 11 & 14

1959
1st Team time trial, Central American and Caribbean Games (with Pablo Hurtado and Efraín Forero)
1960
1st Stage 4 Vuelta a Colombia
