= Daniela Salazar =

Colombian cyclist

Personal information
- Full name: Daniela Salazar

Cycling career
- Sport: Cycling
- Role: Rider

Daniela Salazar is a Colombian former professional racing cyclist. She won the Colombian National Road Race Championships in 2009.
