= Pablo Hurtado =

Colombian cyclist

Personal information
- Full name: Pablo Hurtado Castaneda
- Born: 27 March 1932 (age 94) Togüí, Boyacá, Colombia
- Height: 1.65 m (5 ft 5 in)
- Weight: 65 kg (143 lb)

Cycling career
- Sport: Cycling
- Discipline: Road
- Role: Rider

Pablo Hurtado Castaneda (born 27 March 1932) is a Colombian former cyclist. He competed at the 1956 Summer Olympics and the 1960 Summer Olympics.

== Major results ==
1957
1st Stage 11 Vuelta a Colombia
1958
1st Stage 1 Vuelta a Colombia
1959
1st Team time trial, Central American and Caribbean Games (with Efraín Forero and Ramón Hoyos)
1st Stage 4 Vuelta a Colombia
1960
1st Stages 1, 3 & 7 Vuelta a Colombia
