= Toca, Boyacá =

Coordinates: 5°34′N 73°12′W

Toca
- Municipality and town
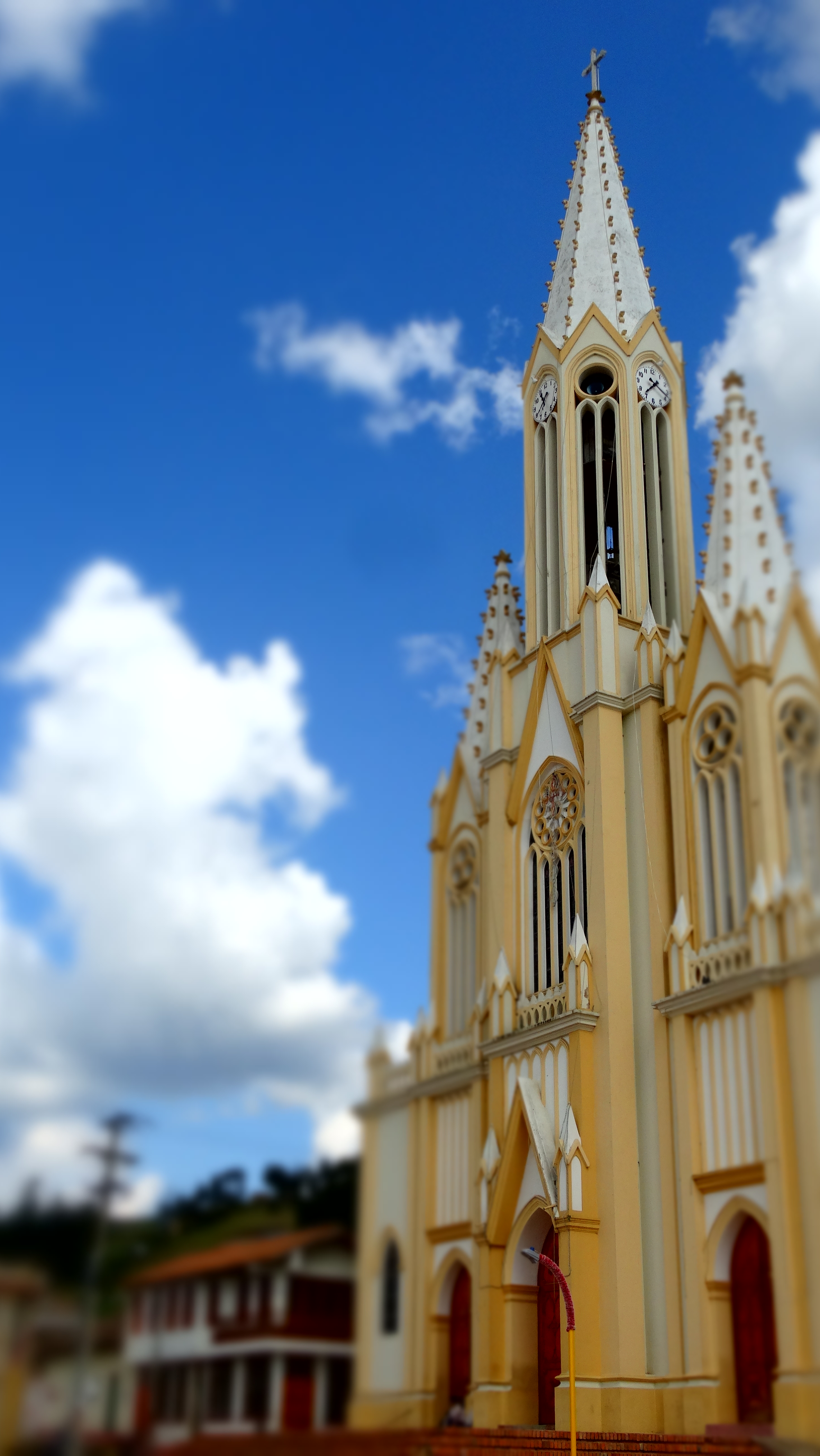
- Church of Toca

- Flag Coat of arms

- Location of the municipality and town of Toca in the Boyacá Department of Colombia
- Country: Colombia
- Department: Boyacá Department
- Province: Central Boyacá Province
- Founded: 7 January 1555
- Founder: Pedro Ruíz García

Government
  - Mayor: Segundo Crisanto Ochoa Díaz (2020-2023)

Area
  - Municipality and town: 165 km^{2} (64 sq mi)
- Elevation: 2,810 m (9,220 ft)

Population (2015)
  - Municipality and town: 10,157
  - Density: 61.6/km^{2} (159/sq mi)
  - Urban: 3,629
- Time zone: UTC-5 (Colombia Standard Time)
- Website: Official website

Toca is a town and municipality in the Colombian Department of Boyacá, part of the subregion of the Central Boyacá Province. Toca is situated on the Altiplano Cundiboyacense 27 kilometres (17 mi) northeast from the department capital Tunja. It borders Tuta in the north, Siachoque in the south, Pesca in the east and Tuta and Chivatá in the west.

== History ==
Before the Spanish conquest of the central highlands of the Colombian Andes, the area was inhabited by the Muisca people, organized in a loose confederation of different rulers. Toca was reigned by the iraca of Sugamuxi, present-day Sogamoso. The troops of conquistador Gonzalo Jiménez de Quesada entered the Altiplano Cundiboyacense in 1537. The year of foundation of modern Toca is not entirely clear, but set at 1555 by Pedro Ruíz García.

== Etymology ==
In the Chibcha language of the Muisca, Toca means "Domain of the river".

== Economy ==
The economy of Toca is based on agriculture and livestock farming, with a small mining (salt) part. Main agricultural products are wheat, potatoes, maize, barley, peas, beans, apples, pears, peaches, curubas and cherries.

== Climate ==
Climate data for Toca (Copa La), elevation 2,700 m (8,900 ft), (1981–2010)
Month	Jan	Feb	Mar	Apr	May	Jun	Jul	Aug	Sep	Oct	Nov	Dec	Year
Mean daily maximum °C (°F)	20.2 (68.4)	20.8 (69.4)	20.7 (69.3)	19.8 (67.6)	18.9 (66.0)	18.2 (64.8)	18.0 (64.4)	18.3 (64.9)	18.8 (65.8)	19.1 (66.4)	19.3 (66.7)	19.8 (67.6)	19.3 (66.7)
Daily mean °C (°F)	13.2 (55.8)	13.6 (56.5)	13.9 (57.0)	14.0 (57.2)	13.8 (56.8)	13.4 (56.1)	13.1 (55.6)	13.2 (55.8)	13.3 (55.9)	13.6 (56.5)	13.8 (56.8)	13.5 (56.3)	13.5 (56.3)
Mean daily minimum °C (°F)	5.5 (41.9)	6.2 (43.2)	7.6 (45.7)	8.4 (47.1)	8.4 (47.1)	7.6 (45.7)	7.2 (45.0)	7.3 (45.1)	7.0 (44.6)	7.4 (45.3)	7.8 (46.0)	6.7 (44.1)	7.2 (45.0)
Average precipitation mm (inches)	27.4 (1.08)	32.9 (1.30)	70.8 (2.79)	91.2 (3.59)	92.4 (3.64)	54.4 (2.14)	55.2 (2.17)	41.9 (1.65)	54.0 (2.13)	86.8 (3.42)	90.6 (3.57)	46.6 (1.83)	734.6 (28.92)
Average precipitation days	7	8	12	16	19	18	17	16	15	17	16	11	169
Average relative humidity (%)	78	77	78	80	81	81	81	81	80	81	80	80	80
Mean monthly sunshine hours	213.9	186.3	158.1	123.0	120.9	132.0	145.7	142.6	132.0	136.4	150.0	189.1	1,830
Mean daily sunshine hours	6.9	6.6	5.1	4.1	3.9	4.4	4.7	4.6	4.4	4.4	5.0	6.1	5.0
Source: Instituto de Hidrologia Meteorologia y Estudios Ambientales

== Gallery ==
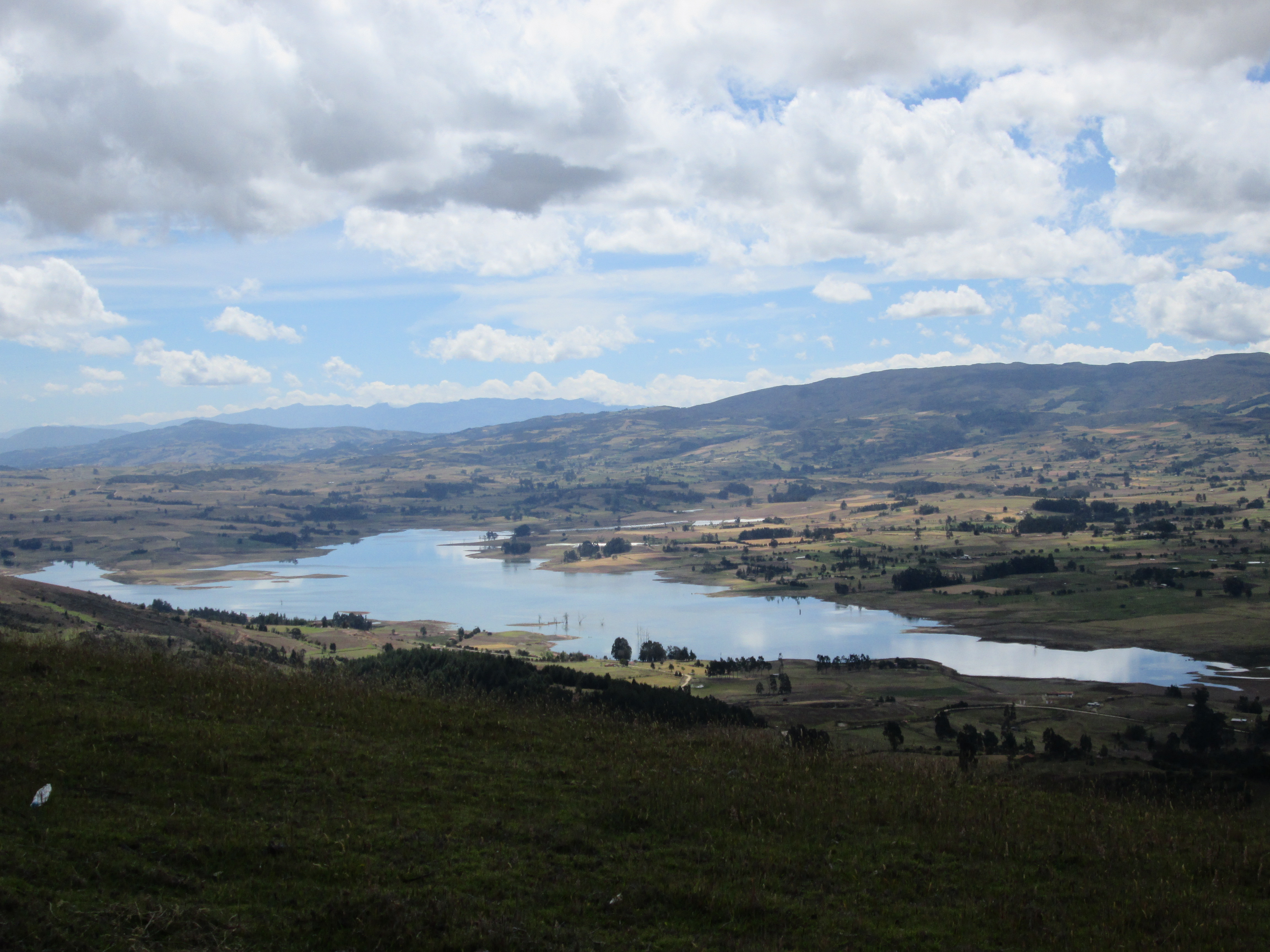
Artificial lake La Copa

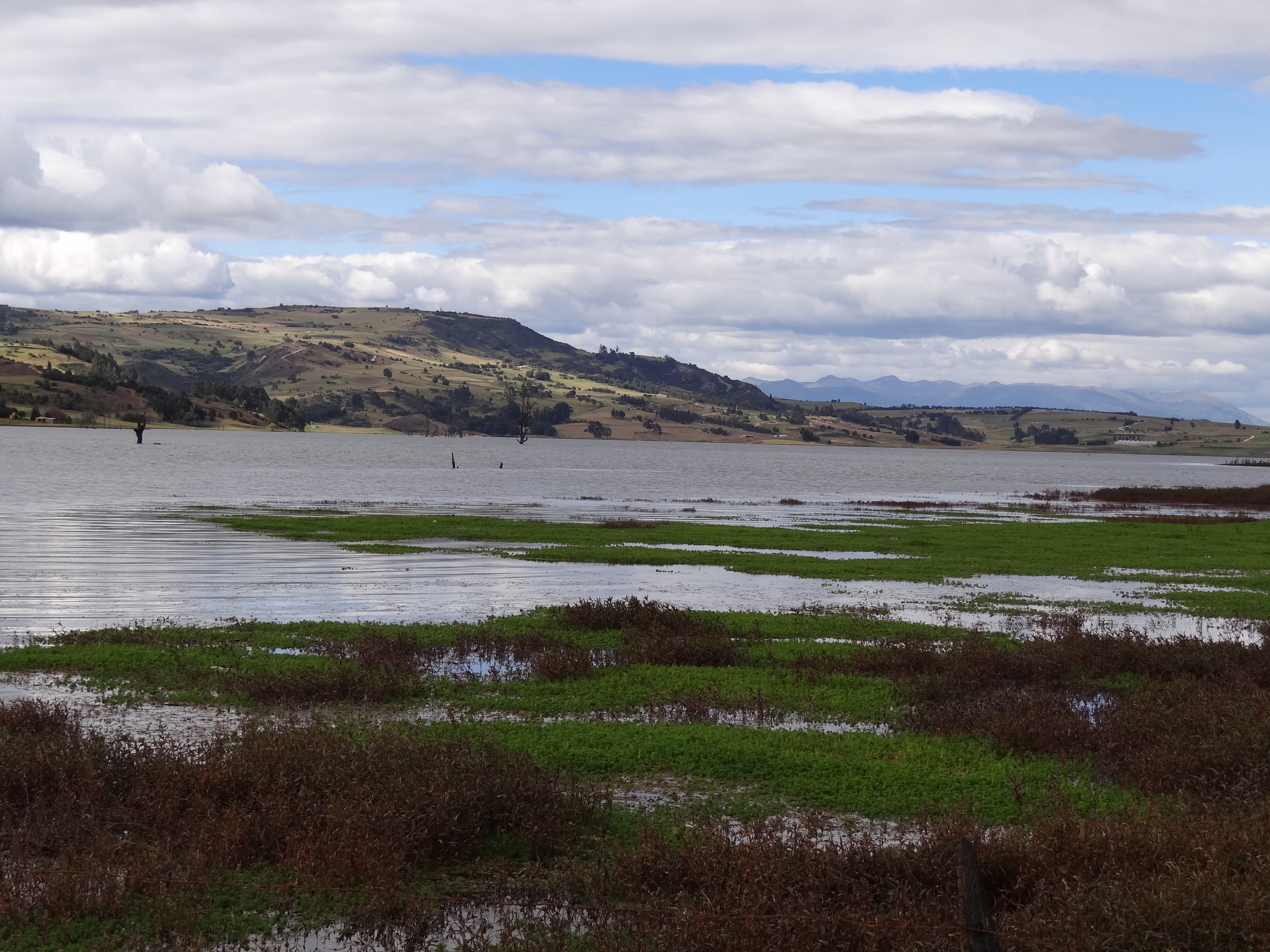
La Copa

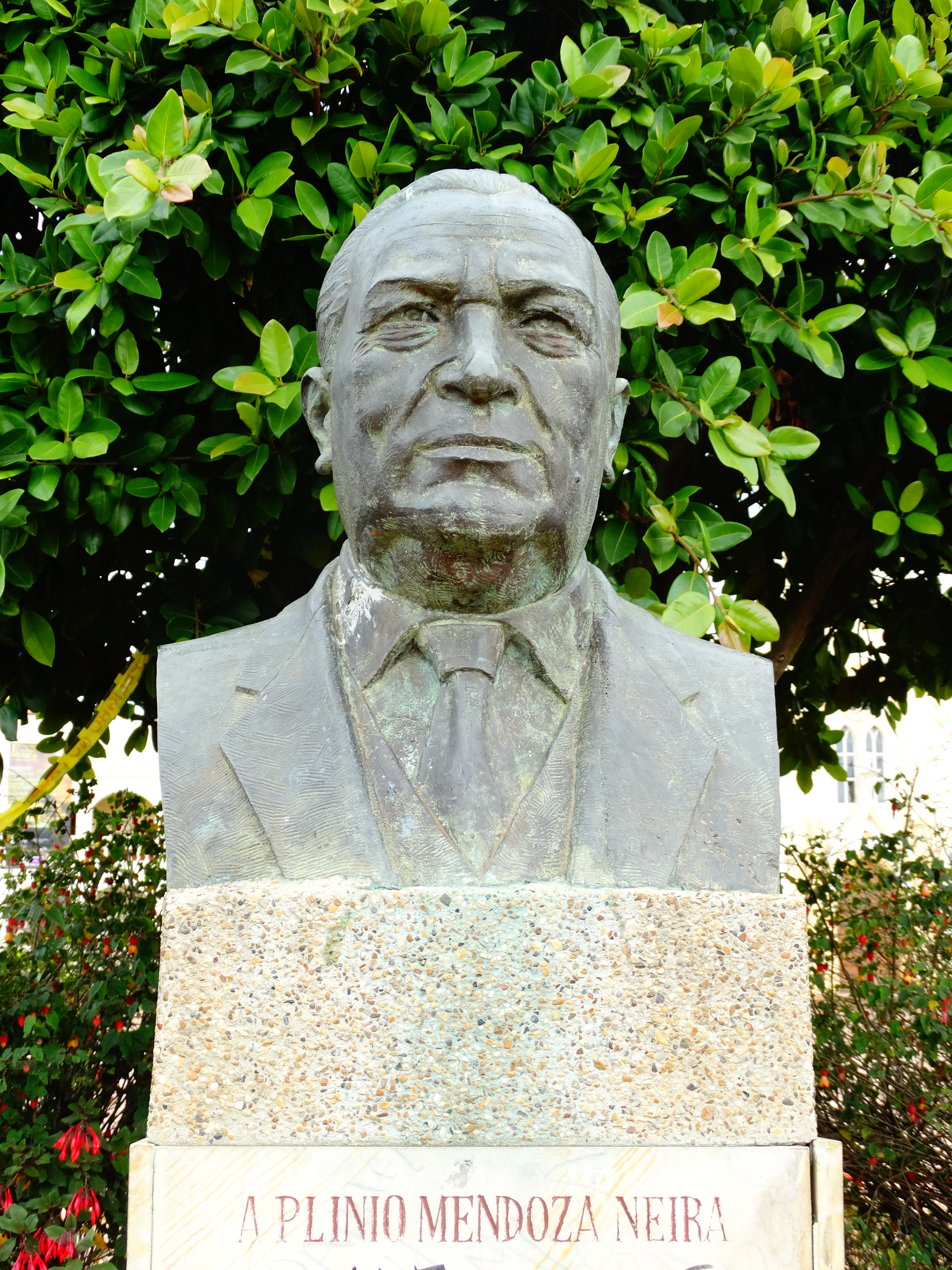
Monument to Plinio Mendoza Neira
