= Viviana Velásquez =

Colombian cyclist

Personal information
- Full name: Viviana Velásquez
- Born: 1 December 1991 (age 34)

Cycling career
- Sport: Cycling
- Role: Rider

Viviana Velásquez (born 1 December 1991) is a Colombian former professional racing cyclist. She won the Colombian National Road Race Championships in 2010 and 2011.
