= Ana-M. Betancourt =

Colombian cyclist

Personal information
- Full name: Ana-M. Betancourt

Cycling career
- Sport: Cycling
- Role: Rider

Ana-M. Betancourt is a Colombian former professional racing cyclist. She won the Colombian National Road Race Championships in 1998.
