= Nancy Casallas =

Colombian cyclist

Personal information
- Born: 21 October 1981 (age 44)

Cycling career
- Sport: Cycling
- Role: Rider

Nancy Casallas (born 21 October 1981) is a Colombian former professional racing cyclist. She won the Colombian National Road Race Championships in 2002.
