= Adriana Muriel =

Colombian cyclist

Personal information
- Full name: Adriana Muriel

Cycling career
- Sport: Cycling
- Role: Rider

Adriana Muriel is a Colombian former professional racing cyclist. She won the Colombian National Road Race Championships in 1990.
