= Pedro Julio Sánchez =

Colombian cyclist

Pedro Sánchez
Personal information
- Nickname: El león del Tolima
- Born: 8 April 1940 (age 86) Chaparral, Tolima, Colombia

Cycling career
- Sport: Cycling

Pedro Julio Sánchez (born 8 April 1940) is a retired Colombian road racing cyclist who won the 1968 Vuelta a Colombia. He also competed at the 1964 Summer Olympics and the 1968 Summer Olympics.
