= Magdaly Trujillo =

Colombian cyclist

Personal information
- Born: 7 August 1984 (age 42)

Cycling career
- Sport: Cycling
- Role: Rider

Magdaly Trujillo (born 7 August 1984) is a Colombian former professional racing cyclist. She won the Colombian National Road Race Championships in 2006.
