= Luisa Naranjo =

Colombian cyclist

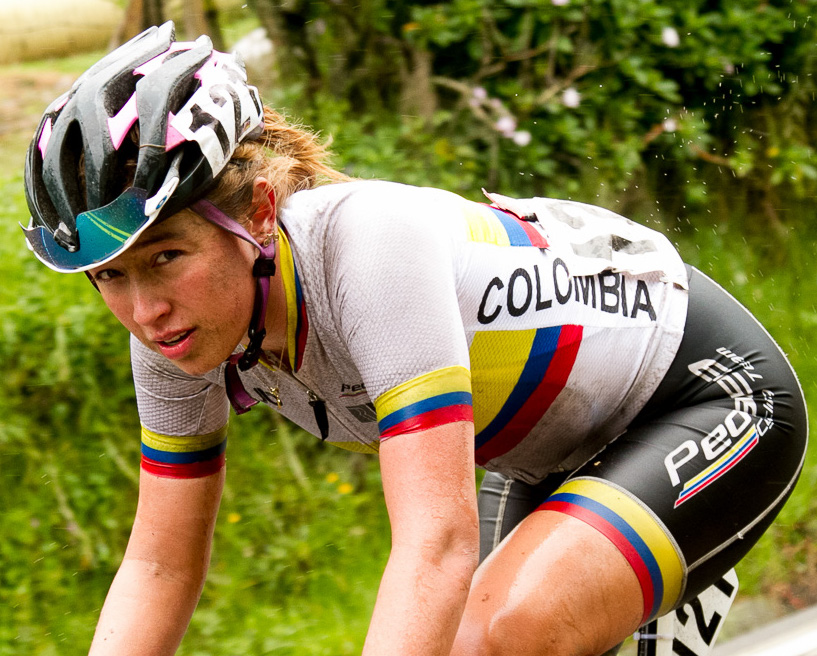

Personal information
- Full name: Luisa Naranjo
- Born: 12 December 1994 (age 31)

Cycling career
- Sport: Cycling
- Role: Rider

Luisa Naranjo (born 16 May 1997) is a Colombian professional racing cyclist. She won the Colombian National Road Race Championships in 2017.
