= Efraín Forero Triviño =

Colombian cyclist (1930–2022)

Personal information
- Full name: Efraín Forero Triviño
- Nicknames: El Zipa; El Indomable Zipa
- Born: 4 March 1930 Zipaquirá, Colombia
- Died: 12 September 2022 (aged 92)

Cycling career
- Sport: Cycling
- Discipline: Road
- Role: Rider
- Rider type: Climbing specialist

Major wins
- Vuelta a Colombia (1951)

Efraín Forero Triviño (4 March 1930 – 12 September 2022) was a Colombian road racing cyclist.

Forero or El Zipa as he was known was involved in the organisation of the first Vuelta a Colombia. He was chosen to ride between the cities of Fresno and Manizales, via Páramo de Letras, as a preliminary race, and to define the route of the tour. The following year, 1951, the first Vuelta a Colombia took place. It was a 1,233 kilometers race which was divided in 10 stages, including 3 days off. Forero won this first Vuelta a Colombia. He won seven stages along the way. He would win a further three stages and would finish 4th overall in 1953 and 1954, as well as second overall in the 1957 Vuelta a Colombia behind Spaniard José Gómez del Moral.

== Major results ==
1950
1st Road race, National Road Championships
1st Team pursuit, Central American and Caribbean Games
1951
1st Overall Vuelta a Colombia

1st Stages 1, 2, 3, 6, 7, 8 & 10

1952
1st Stage 5 Vuelta a Colombia
2nd Road race, National Road Championships
1953
1st Road race, National Road Championships
4th Overall Vuelta a Colombia

1st Stage 1

1954
1st Road race, National Road Championships
1st Team time trial, Central American and Caribbean Games (with Héctor Mesa, Justo Londoño and Ramón Hoyos)
4th Overall Vuelta a Colombia

1st Stage 15

1956
3rd Overall Vuelta a Colombia
1957
2nd Overall Vuelta a Colombia
1958
1st Road race, National Road Championships
1959
1st Team time trial, Central American and Caribbean Games (with Pablo Hurtado and Ramón Hoyos)
