= Rubén Darío Gómez =

Colombian cyclist

Personal information
- Full name: Rubén Darío Gómez Bedoya
- Nickname: El Tigrillo de Pereira
- Born: 3 March 1940 Chinchiná, Caldas, Colombia
- Died: 23 July 2010 (aged 70)

Cycling career
- Sport: Cycling
- Discipline: Road
- Role: Rider
- Rider type: Climbing specialist

Major wins
- Vuelta a Colombia (1959, 1961); Clásico RCN (1961, 1962); Vuelta a Guatemala (1964)

Rubén Darío Gómez (3 March 1940 – 23 July 2010) was a Colombian road racing cyclist. He won the two most important stage races in Colombia, the Vuelta a Colombia and the Clásico RCN two times. He also competed at the 1960 Summer Olympics and the 1964 Summer Olympics.

== Major results ==
1957
1st Stage 10 Vuelta a Colombia
1958
1st Stage 12 Vuelta a Colombia
1959
1st Overall Vuelta a Colombia

1st Stages 2, 8, 12 & 14

1960
1st Stages 13 & 15 Vuelta a Colombia
2nd Overall Vuelta a Mexico
1961
1st Overall Vuelta a Colombia

1st Stages 2 & 7

1st Overall Clásico RCN

1st Mountains classification
1st Stage 1

1962
1st Overall Clásico RCN

1st Stage 1

1st Stage 14 Vuelta a Colombia
Central American and Caribbean Games

2nd Team time trial
3rd Road race

1963
2nd Overall Vuelta a Colombia

1st Stages 1 & 10

1964
1st Overall Vuelta a Guatemala

1st Mountains classification

2nd Overall Vuelta a Colombia

1st Stage 5

3rd Overall Vuelta a Mexico

1st Mountains classification
1st Stage 2

1965
3rd Overall Vuelta a Colombia

1st Stage 13

1966
1st Stage 7 Vuelta a Colombia
1968
1st Stage 8 Vuelta a Colombia
