= César Goyeneche =

Colombian cyclist

Personal information
- Born: 26 August 1974 (age 52) Bogotá, Colombia

Cycling career
- Sport: Cycling
- Role: Rider

César Goyeneche (born 26 August 1974) is a Colombian former professional racing cyclist. He won the Colombian National Road Race Championships in 1999.
