= 2012 Vuelta a Colombia =

2011–12 UCI America Tour
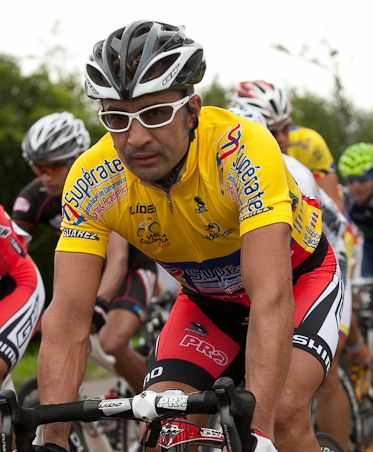
- Félix Cárdenas 2012

Race details
- Dates: 12–24 June 2012
- Stages: 11
- Distance: 1,704.4 km (1,059.1 mi)
- Winning time: 38h 52' 32"

Results
Jersey awarded to the overall winner	Winner	Félix Cárdenas (COL)
	Second	Alejandro Ramírez (COL)
	Third	Flober Peña (COL)

The 62nd edition of the Vuelta a Colombia was held from 12 to 24 June 2012. It was won by the Colombian cyclist Félix Cárdenas.
