= Roberto Buitrago =

Colombian cyclist (1937–2025)

Personal information
- Born: 13 January 1937 Guayatá, Boyacá Department, Colombia
- Died: 23 December 2025 (aged 88) Bogotá, Colombia

Cycling career
- Sport: Cycling
- Discipline: Road racing

Major wins
- 1st in the Vuelta a Colombia (1962); 2nd in the Vuelta a Colombia (1960); 3rd in the Vuelta a Colombia (1961)

Roberto Buitrago Dueñas (13 January 1937 – 23 December 2025), known as Pajarito Buitrago, was a Colombian road racing cyclist who won the Vuelta a Colombia in 1962 with just 8 seconds over second-placed finisher Martín Emilio Rodríguez. He also came second and third in the 1960 and 1961 editions of this race. Buitrago also won the King of the Mountains competition in the 1958 Vuelta a Guatemala and he competed in the team time trial at the 1960 Summer Olympics.

Buitrago died on 23 December 2025 in Bogotá, at the age of 88.
