= Hernán Medina Calderón =

Colombian cyclist

Personal information
- Full name: Hernán Medina Calderón
- Nickname: El príncipe estudiante
- Born: August 29, 1937 (age 89) Yarumal, Colombia

Cycling career
- Sport: Cycling
- Current team: Retired
- Discipline: Road
- Role: Rider
- Rider type: Climbing specialist

Major wins
- Vuelta a Guatemala (1958); Vuelta a Colombia (1960)

Hernán Medina Calderón (born August 29, 1937, in Yarumal, in the Antioquia Department, Colombia) is a retired Colombian road racing cyclist who won the Vuelta a Colombia in 1960 and the Vuelta a Guatemala in 1958. He also finished as runner up in the Vuelta a Colombia in 1959 and 1961. He competed in the individual road race and team time trial events at the 1960 Summer Olympics.
