= Alfonso Flórez Ortiz =

Colombian cyclist (1952–1992)

Personal information
- Born: November 5, 1952 Bucaramanga, Santander, Colombia
- Died: April 25, 1992 (aged 39) Medellín, Antioquia, Colombia

Cycling career
- Sport: Cycling
- Discipline: Road racing
- Role: Rider

Professional team
- 1985-1987: Café de Colombia

Major wins
- 1st in the Tour de l'Avenir (1980); 1st in the Vuelta a Colombia (1979, 1983)

Alfonzo Flórez Ortiz (November 5, 1952 – April 25, 1992) was a Colombian road racing cyclist who was a professional from 1985 to 1987, where he rode for the Colombian professional cycling team Café de Colombia team.

Born in Bucaramanga, Santander Flórez Ortiz won the most important race in Colombia, the Vuelta a Colombia in 1979 and 1983. He frequently rode for the Colombian national cycling team and won the Tour de l'Avenir in 1980. Flórez made history when he captained the first Colombian cycle team in the Tour de France in 1983.

He was murdered in April 1992 in Medellín.
