= Clásico RCN =

Race details
- Date: October
- Region: Colombia
- English name: RCN Classic
- Local name(s): Clásico RCN (in Spanish)
- Discipline: Road race
- Type: Stage race

History
- First edition: 1961
- Editions: 65 (as of 2025)
- First winner: Rubén Darío Gómez (COL)
- Most wins: Rafael Antonio Niño (COL) (5 wins)
- Most recent: Diego Camargo (COL)

The Clásico RCN (Spanish for RCN Classic) is an annual cycling road race that takes place over many stages through different regions of Colombia during October. It is organized by the Colombian Cycling Federation.

The event is sponsored by Radio Cadena Nacional, which is one of the oldest and largest radio networks in Colombia, and by a network of Colombian business in Medellín "Empresas Públicas de Medellín". The Clásico RCN and the Vuelta a Colombia are the most important stage races in Colombia.

== History ==
The first event was held in 1961 and was won by Rubén Darío Gómez. Many well-known Colombian cyclists have won the event, including Martín Emilio Rodríguez, Fabio Parra, Luis Herrera and Rafael Antonio Niño.

During the 1980s, the Clásico RCN held several "open" events in which professional cycling teams from Europe came and competed in the race. It has been written that the reason for this was for Elite professionals in Europe to get altitude training in the early season in Colombia. Some of the teams competing in the Clásico RCN during the eighties included Peugeot–Shell–Michelin, Renault–Elf–Gitane, Sem–France Loire, La Vie Claire, Zor and Reynolds which resulted in stage wins by Pascal Simon, Laurent Fignon, Bernard Hinault, Charly Mottet and Martial Gayant. In the 1992 edition of the Clásico RCN, the Carrera Jeans–Vagabond and Festina cycling teams competed where Sean Kelly, Claudio Chiappucci, Thomas Wegmüller won stages of the event.

In the history of the event, there has been two times when the overall winner was later disqualified for doping. This happened in 1971 when Álvaro Pachón Morales was disqualified, and the win was given to Rafael Antonio Niño, and also in 1991 when Pablo Emilio Wilches Tumbia was disqualified with the win going to Fabio Hernán Rodríguez Hernández. There was a tragic accident in the 1985 edition of the race when Jorge Iván Ramírez fell during a stage and died later.

Although the Clásico RCN now occurs in October, past events have taken place in March, April, May and August. It began as a two-day event, but its duration and distance were increased and, in 2000, it consisted of ten stages.

== Past winners ==
Year	Country	Rider	Team
1961	Colombia	Rubén Darío Gómez	Camisas Jarcano
1962	Colombia	Rubén Darío Gómez	Camisas Jarcano
1963	Colombia	Martín Emilio Rodríguez	Antioquia Blue Bell–Wrangler
1964	Colombia	Gabriel Buitrago	Antioquia–Cuadernos Bolivariana
1965	Colombia	Jesús Suárez Cueva	Antioquia Suramericana
1966	Colombia	Jesús Suárez Cueva	Antioquia Suramericana
1967	Colombia	Martín Emilio Rodríguez	Antioqua Wrangler–Caribú
1968	Colombia	Jairo Grijalba	Valle–Canada Dry
1969	Colombia	Álvaro Pachòn Morales	Cundinamarca Relojes Pierce
1970	Colombia	Oscar González	Pilsen
1971	Colombia	Rafael Antonio Niño	Singer
1972	Colombia	Albeiro Mejía	Caribú
1973	Colombia	Juan de Dios Morales	Singer
1974	Colombia	Norberto Cáceres	Ferreteria Reina
1975	Colombia	Rafael Antonio Niño	Banco Cafetero
1976	Colombia	José Jiménez Bautista	Banco Cafetero
1977	Colombia	Rafael Antonio Niño	Banco Cafetero
1978	Colombia	Rafael Antonio Niño	Benotto
1979	Colombia	Rafael Antonio Niño	Lotería de Boyacá
1980	Colombia	Fabio Navarro	Perfumeria Janeth
1981	Colombia	Manuel Gutiérrez	Bicicletas Ositto
1982	Colombia	Luis Herrera	Freskola
1983	Colombia	Luis Herrera	Isla de Aquitania
1984	Colombia	Luis Herrera	Pilas–Varta
1985	Colombia	Francisco Rodriguez	Zor
1986	Colombia	Luis Herrera	Café de Colombia
1987	Colombia	Fabio Parra	Café de Colombia
1988	Colombia	Álvaro Mejía	Castalia
1989	Colombia	Álvaro Mejía	Manzana Postobón
1990	Colombia	Gustavo Wilches	Manzana Postobón
1991	Colombia	Fabio Rodríguez	Pony Malta-Avianca
1992	Colombia	Alberto Camargo	Manzana Postobón
1993	Colombia	Luis Alberto González	Glacial
1994	Colombia	Julio César Aguirre	Manzana Postobón
1995	Colombia	Raúl Montaña	ZG Mobili Glacial
1996	Colombia	Israel Ochoa	Glacial
1997	Colombia	Raúl Montaña	Caprecone
1998	Colombia	Raúl Montaña	Aguardiente Nectar
1999	Colombia	Jairo Hernández	Orbitel
2000	Colombia	Juan Diego Ramírez	Orbitel
2001	Colombia	Juan Diego Ramírez	Orbitel
2002	Colombia	José Castelblanco	Columbia Selle Italia Alc.Cabimas
2003	Colombia	José Castelblanco	Columbia Selle Italia Alc.Cabimas
2004	Colombia	Hernán Buenahora	Orbitel
2005	Colombia	Libardo Niño	Lotería de Boyacá Coordinadora
2006	Colombia	Javier Alberto González	EPM Orbitel
2007	Colombia	Libardo Niño	UNE Orbitel
2008	Spain	Óscar Sevilla	Rock Racing
2009	Colombia	Mauricio Ortega	UNE–EPM
2010	Colombia	Félix Cárdenas	GW Shimano–Chec Edec
2011	Colombia	Rafael Infantino	EPM–UNE
2012	Spain	Óscar Sevilla	Formesan–Pinturas Bler–IDRD–Bogotá Humana
2013	Colombia	Camilo Gómez	Coldeportes Claro
2014	Bolivia	Óscar Soliz	Movistar Team América
2015	Colombia	Omar Mendoza	Movistar Team América
2016	Spain	Óscar Sevilla	EPM
2017	Colombia	Juan Pablo Suárez	EPM
2018	Colombia	Alex Cano	Coldeportes–Zenú–Sello Rojo
2019	Spain	Óscar Sevilla	Medellín
2020	Colombia	José Tito Hernández	Team Medellín
2021	Colombia	Fabio Duarte	Team Medellín–EPM
2022	Colombia	Aldemar Reyes	Team Medellín–EPM
2023	Colombia	Aldemar Reyes	Team Medellín–EPM
2024	Colombia	Kevin Castillo	Team Sistecredito
2025	Colombia	Diego Camargo	Team Medellín–EPM
