= Miguel Samacá =

Colombian cyclist

Personal information
- Born: 18 May 1946 (age 80) Tuta, Boyacá, Colombia
- Height: 1.72 m (5 ft 8 in)
- Weight: 72 kg (159 lb)

Cycling career
- Sport: Cycling
- Discipline: Road
- Role: Rider

Miguel Samacá (born 18 May 1946) is a Colombian former cyclist. He competed at the 1968, 1972 and the 1976 Summer Olympics. He won the Vuelta a Colombia in 1972 and 1974 as well as the Vuelta al Táchira in 1972.
