= Sandra Gómez (cyclist) =

Colombian cyclist

Personal information
- Born: 30 December 1971 (age 54)

Cycling career
- Sport: Cycling
- Role: Rider

Sandra Gómez (born 30 December 1971) is a Colombian former professional racing cyclist. She won the Colombian National Road Race Championships in 2007. She won the Individual Pursuit bronze medal in the 2002 Pan American Championships.
