= Tuta, Boyacá =

Coordinates: 5°42′N 73°14′W

Tuta
- Municipality and town
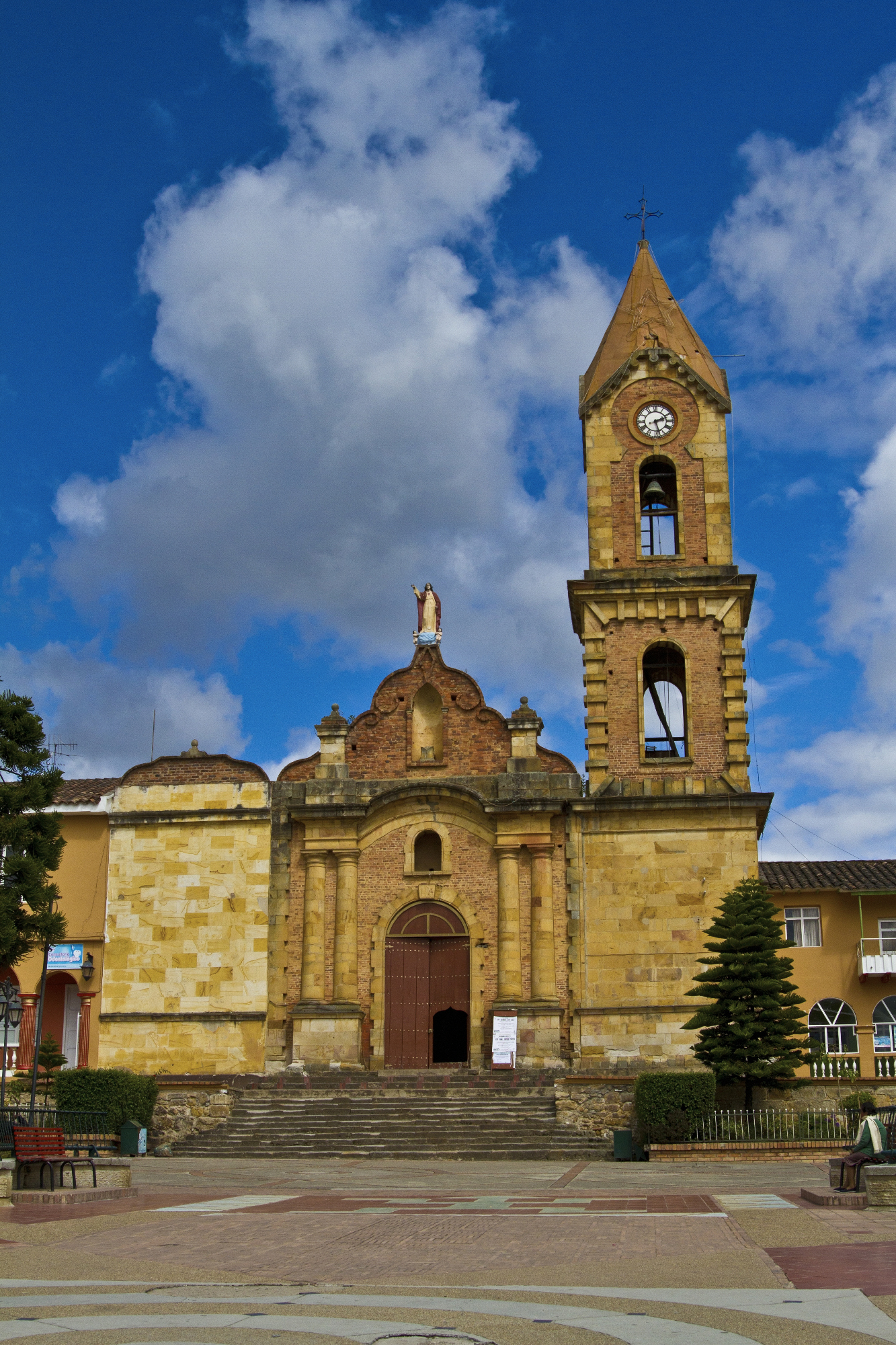
- Church of Tuta

- Flag

- Location of the municipality and town of Tuta in the Boyacá Department of Colombia
- Country: Colombia
- Department: Boyacá Department
- Province: Central Boyacá Province
- Founded: 4 June 1776
- Founder: Miguel Sánchez and Juan Rodríguez Parra

Government
  - Mayor: Wilblin Yesid Soto Monroy (2020-2023)

Area
  - Municipality and town: 165 km^{2} (64 sq mi)
  - Urban: 0.782 km^{2} (0.302 sq mi)
- Elevation: 2,600 m (8,500 ft)

Population (2015)
  - Municipality and town: 9,673
  - Density: 58.6/km^{2} (152/sq mi)
  - Urban: 2,665
- Time zone: UTC-5 (Colombia Standard Time)
- Website: Official website

Tuta is a town and municipality in the Colombian Department of Boyacá, part of the subregion of the Central Boyacá Province. Tuta is situated on the Altiplano Cundiboyacense at a distance of 26 kilometres (16 mi) from the department capital Tunja. It borders Paipa, Pesca and Firavitoba in the east, Cómbita in the west, Sotaquirá and Paipa in the north and Chivatá, Toca and Oicatá in the south.

== History ==
The area of Tuta before the Spanish conquest was inhabited by the Tuta tribe who belonged to the Muisca who were organized in their loose Muisca Confederation. Ruler of the northern territories was the zaque of Hunza, modern day Tunja, who also reigned over Tuta. The Muisca spoke Chibcha and in that now extinct language Tuta means "Borrowed farmlands" or "Property of the Sun".

Modern Tuta was properly founded on June 4, 1776, by Miguel Sánchez and Juan Rodríguez Parra.

== Economy ==
The economy of Tuta is centered on agriculture, livestock farming and mining. Agricultural products are potatoes, barley, beans, maize, peas, onions and fruits. Mining consists of gypsum, coal, oil, kaolin, iron ore and sulphur. On the Alto de Ginua hill emeralds were discovered.

== Born in Tuta ==
- Miguel Samacá, former professional cyclist
- Miguel Ángel Sanabria, former professional cyclist
- Raúl Sánchez Niño, artist and folkloric music author.

== Gallery ==
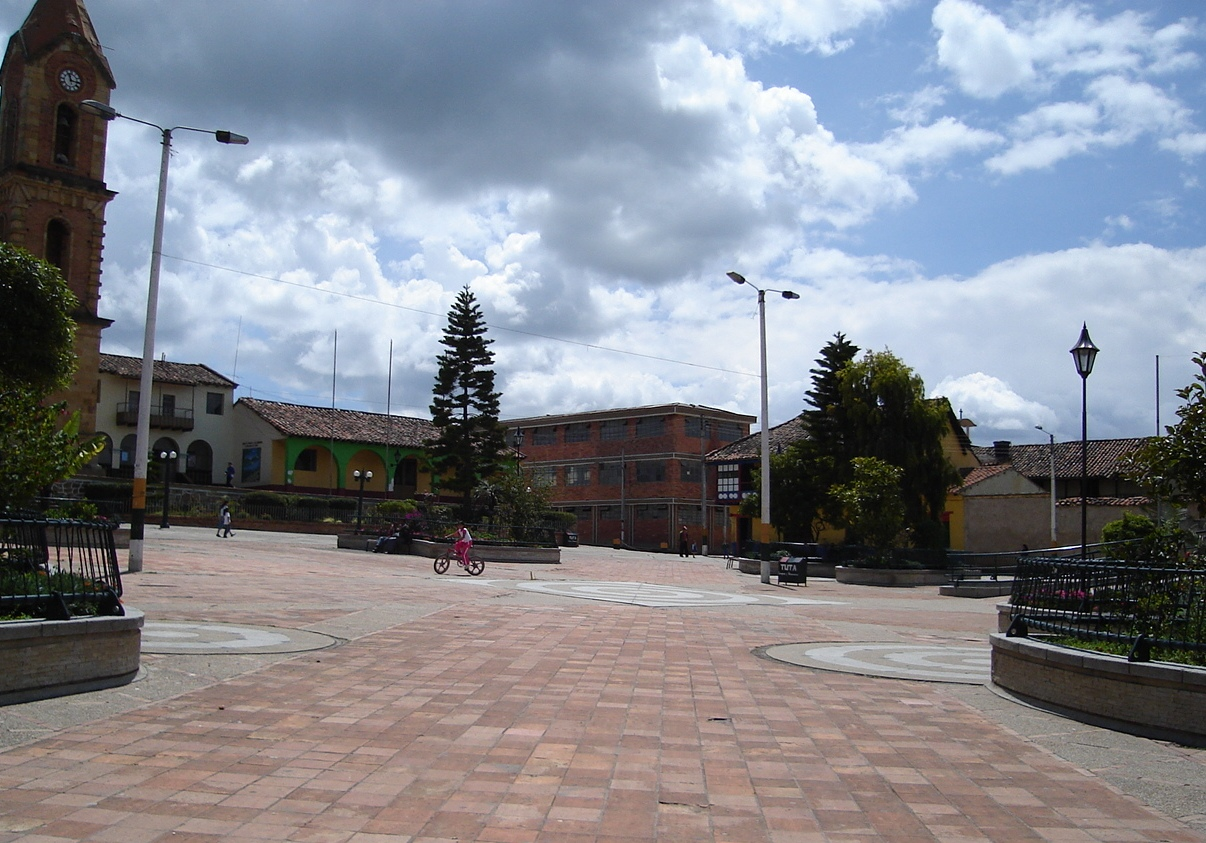
Central square

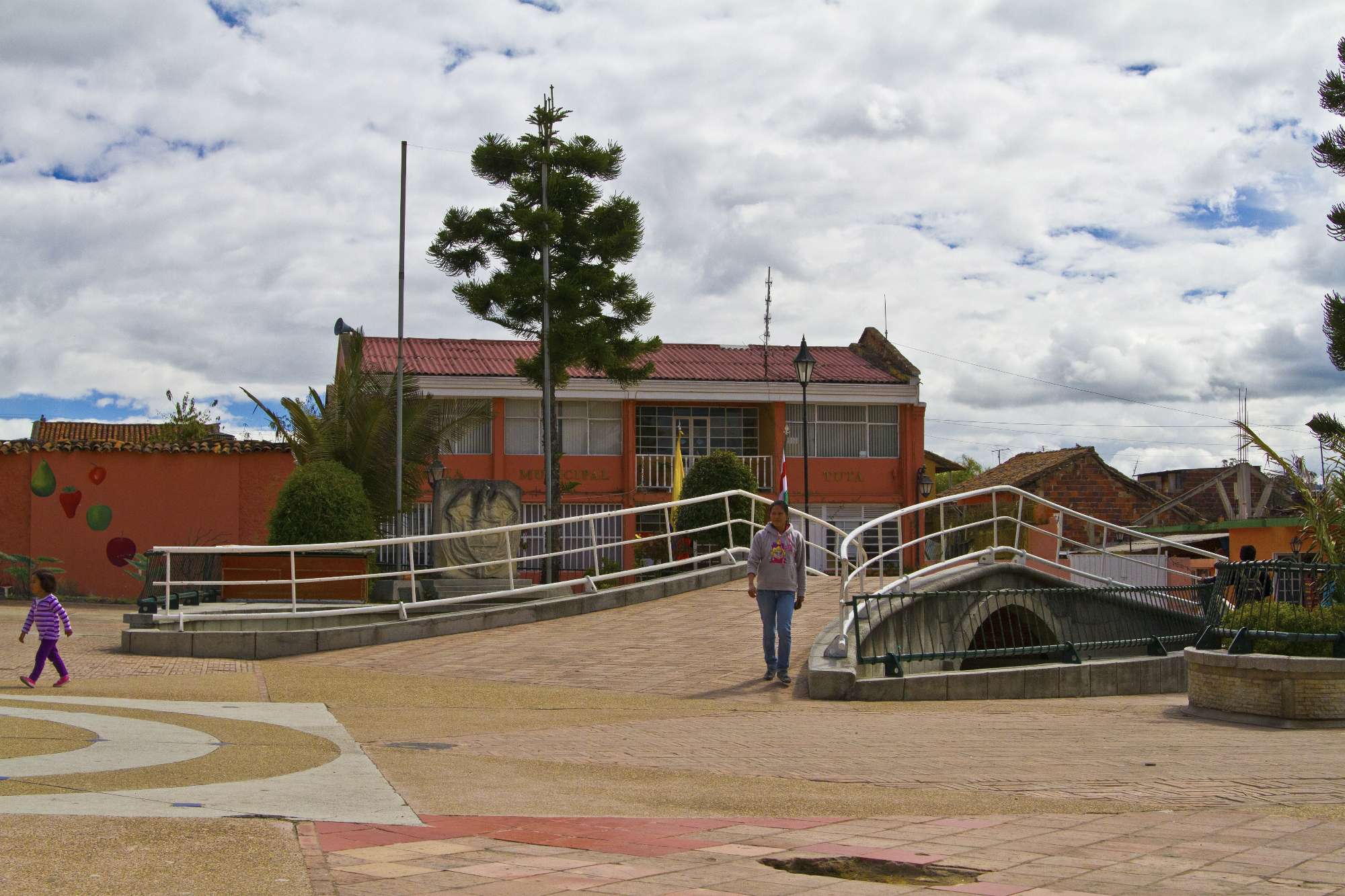
Central square

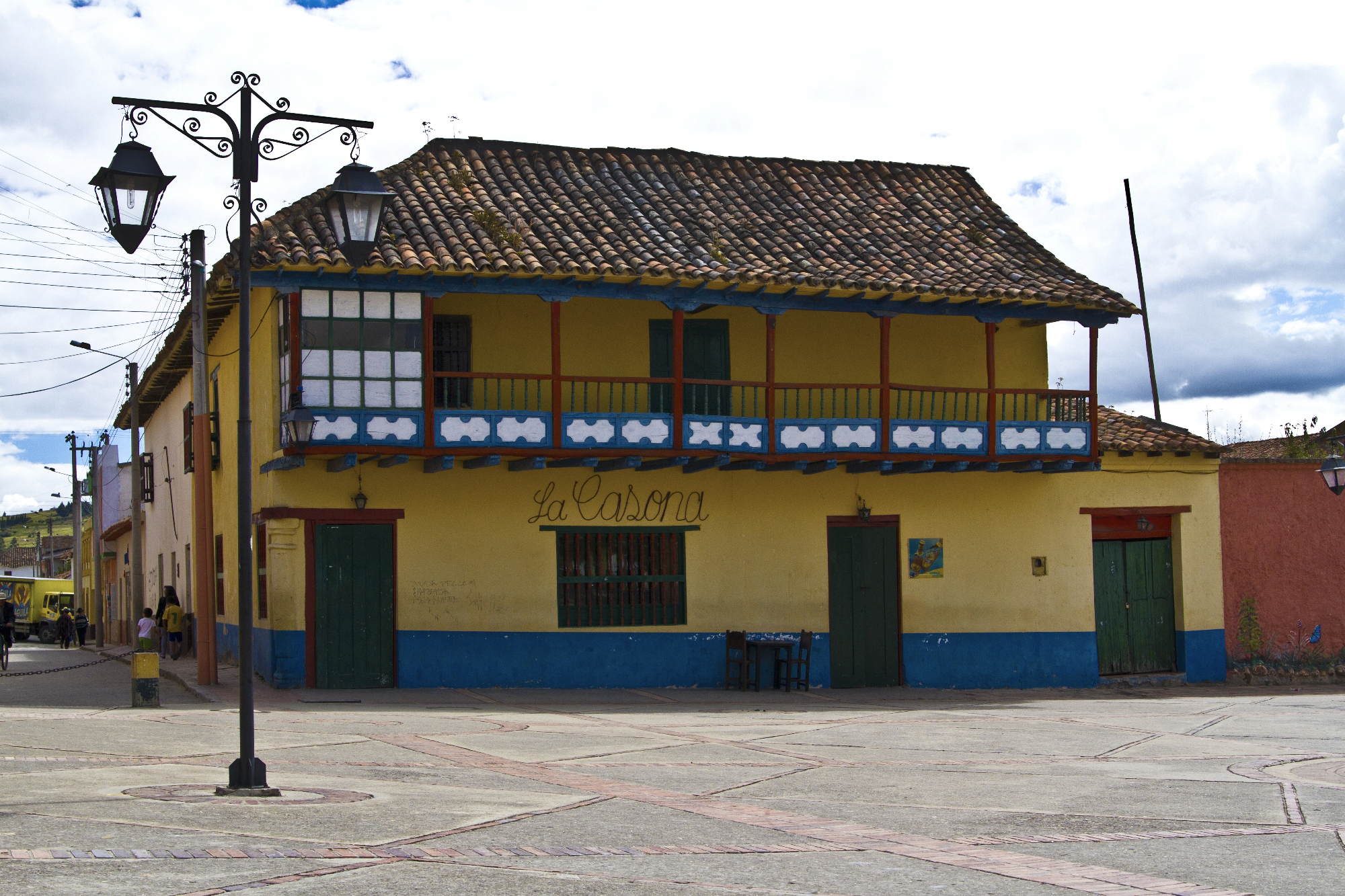
Central square
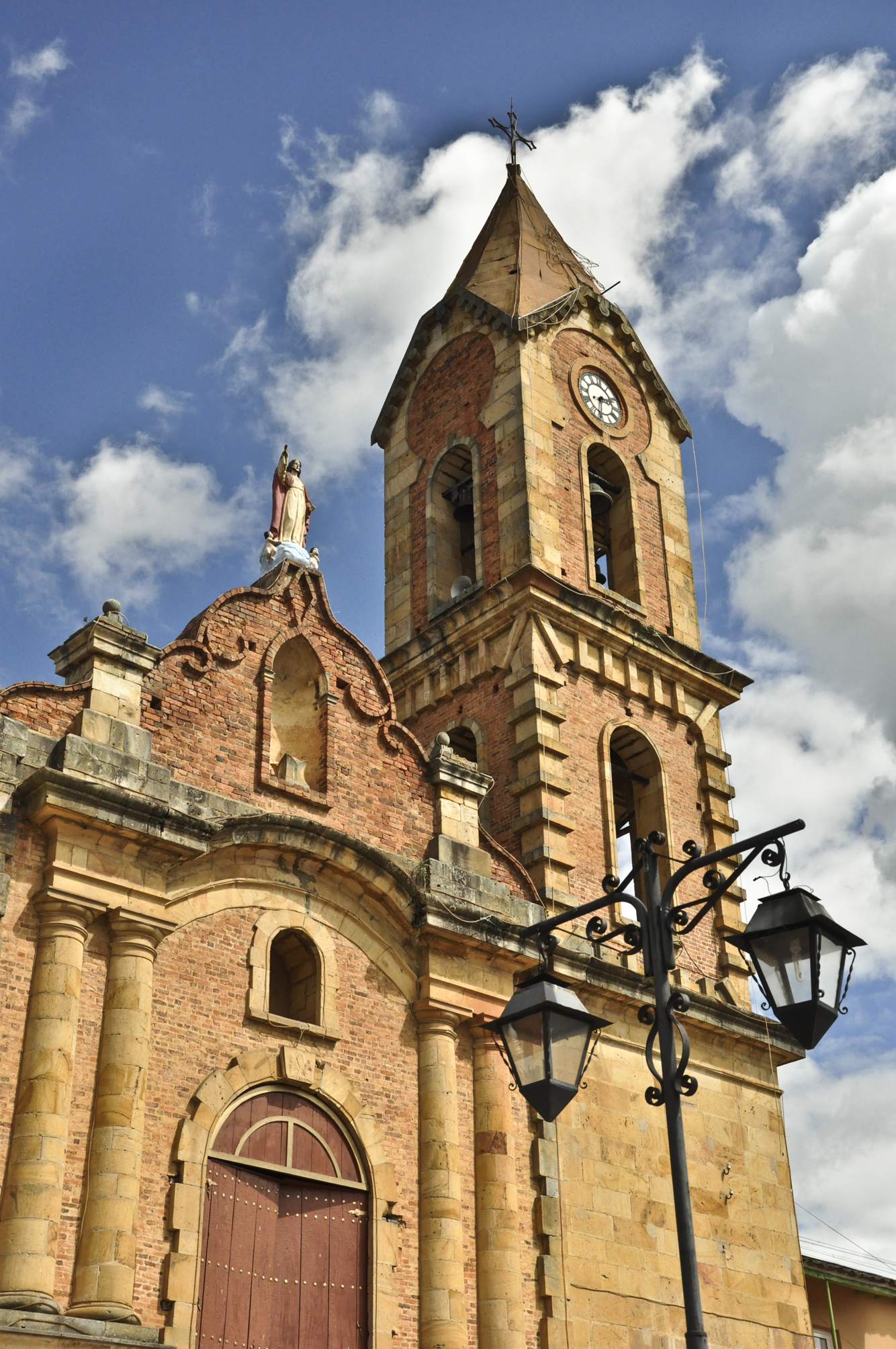
Church of Tuta

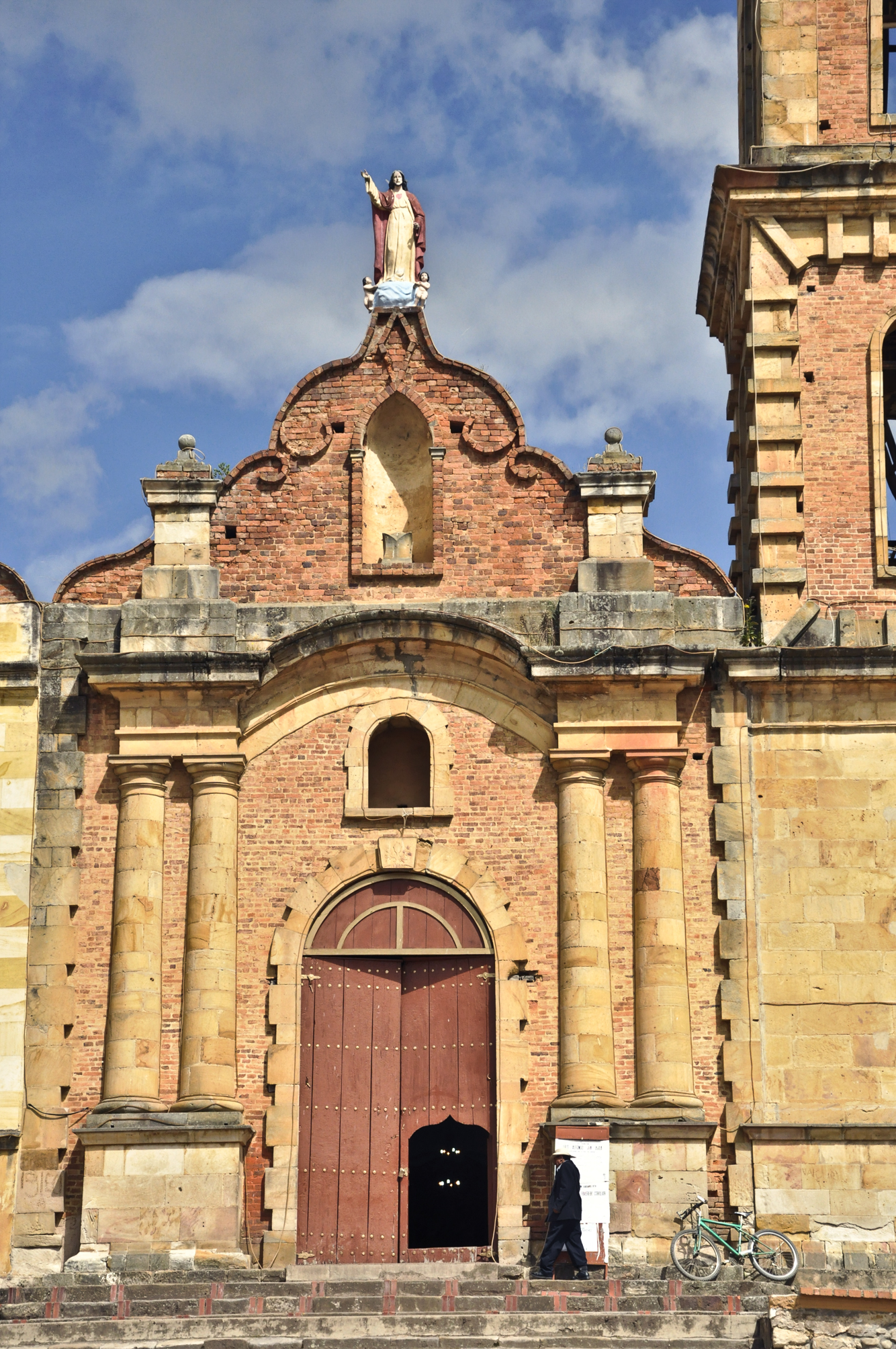
Church front

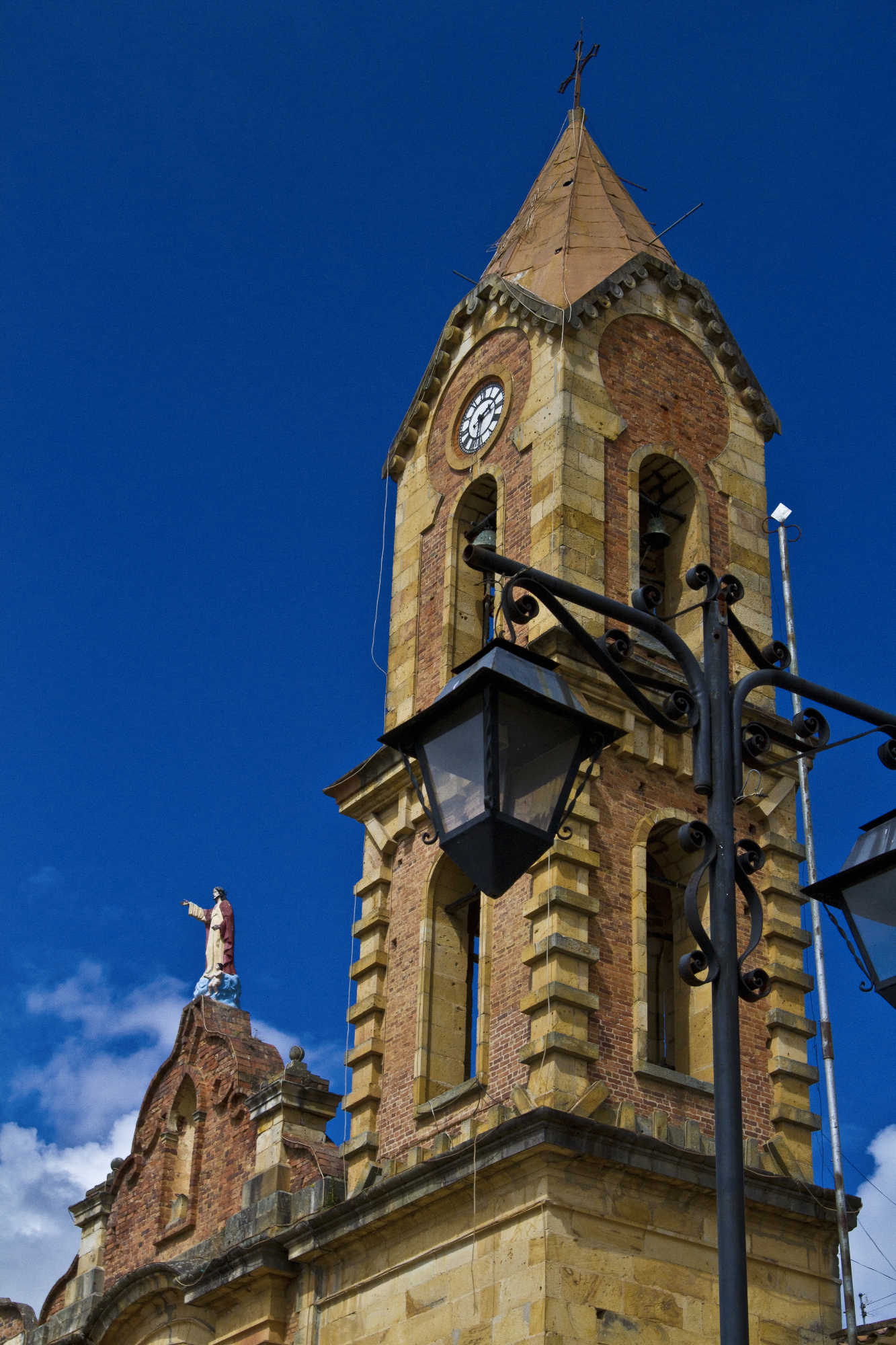
Church tower
