= Pablo Hernández (cyclist) =

Colombian cyclist (1940–2021)

Personal information
- Full name: Pablo Enrique Hernández López
- Born: 12 February 1940 Suesca, Colombia
- Died: 1 January 2021 (aged 80) Pereira, Colombia

Cycling career
- Sport: Cycling

Pablo Enrique Hernández López (12 February 1940 – 1 January 2021) was a Colombian cyclist. He competed in the individual road race and team time trial events at the 1964 Summer Olympics. Hernández died on 1 January 2021, at the age of 80.
