= Team Medellín =

Colombian cycling team

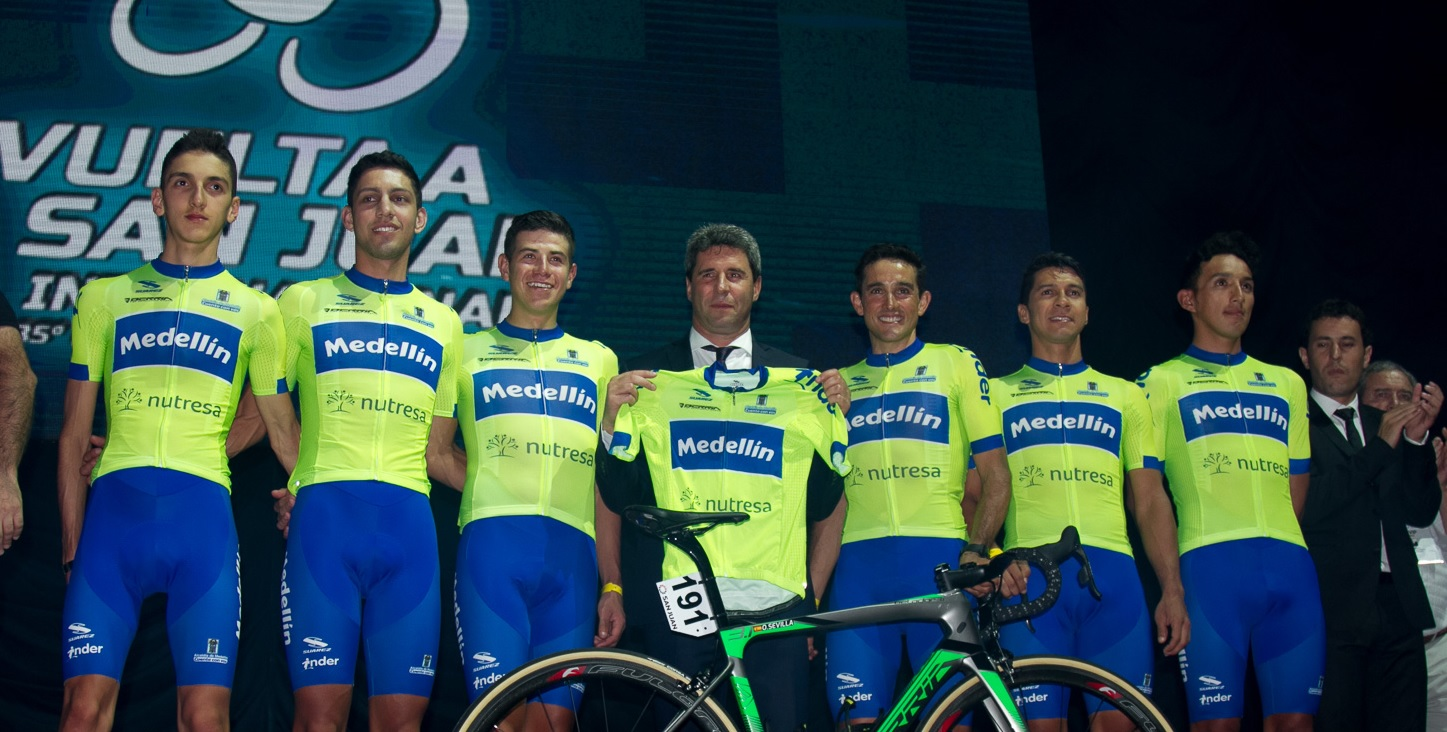
- Members of the Medellín–Inder team at the 2017 Vuelta a San Juan.

Team information
- UCI code: MED
- Registered: Colombia
- Founded: 2017
- Discipline: Road
- Status: UCI Continental

Key personnel
- General manager: José Julián Velásquez
- Team manager: Andrés Felipe Agudelo

Team name history
- 2017 2018–2019 2020–2021 2021–2023 2024–: Medellín–Inder; Medellín; Team Medellín; Team Medellín–EPM; Team Medellín

Team Medellín is a Colombian UCI Continental cycling team founded in 2017.

== Team roster ==
As of 26 January 2024.

Rider	Date of birth
Julián Cardona (COL)	19 January 1997 (age 29)
Fabio Duarte (COL)	11 June 1986 (age 40)
Javier Jamaica (COL)	2 March 1996 (age 30)
Victor Ocampo (COL)	19 June 1999 (age 27)
Róbigzon Oyola (COL)	10 August 1988 (age 38)

Rider	Date of birth
Wilmar Paredes (COL)	27 April 1996 (age 30)
Brayan Sánchez (COL)	3 June 1994 (age 32)
Óscar Sevilla (ESP)	29 September 1976 (age 49)
Christian Tamayo (COL)	21 March 1991 (age 35)
Walter Vargas (COL)	16 April 1992 (age 34)

== Major wins ==
2017
Colombia National Under-23 Time Trial Championships, Julián Cardona
Stage 1 Vuelta a Asturias, Weimar Roldán
Overall Vuelta a la Comunidad de Madrid, Óscar Sevilla
Overall Tour of Ankara, Brayan Ramírez

Stage 1, Brayan Ramírez
Stage 3, Juan Esteban Arango
Stage 4, Óscar Sevilla

Overall Vuelta Ciclista de Chile, César Nicolas Paredes

Stage 4, Cristian Montoya

2018
Overall Vuelta a San Juan, Óscar Sevilla

Stage 5, Óscar Sevilla

Time Trial, Pan American Championships, Walter Vargas
Overall Vuelta Michoacán, Nicolás Paredes
2019
Colombia National Under-23 Time Trial Championships, Harold Tejada
Colombia National Under-23 Road Race Championships, Harold Tejada
Overall Vuelta a la Independencia Nacional, Robinson Chalapud

Stage 1, Robinson Chalapud
Stage 6, Óscar Sevilla

Overall Vuelta Ciclista a Chiloe, Óscar Sevilla

Prologue, Stages 2 & 4 (ITT), Óscar Sevilla

Overall Vuelta del Uruguay, Walter Vargas

Stage 6 (ITT)

Stage 5 Tour of the Gila, Cristhian Montoya
Overall Tour of Qinghai Lake, Robinson Chalapud

Stage 1 (TTT)

2020
Gran Premio de la Patagonia, José Tito Hernández
2021
Stage 4 (ITT) Vuelta al Táchira, Óscar Sevilla
Overall Vuelta a Colombia, José Tito Hernández

Prologue, Óscar Sevilla
Stages 3 & 6 (ITT), Brayan Sánchez
Stage 7, Robinson Chalapud

Stage 1 Tour du Rwanda, Brayan Sánchez
Colombia National Time Trial Championships, Walter Vargas
Time Trial, Pan American Championships, Walter Vargas
2022
Overall Vuelta a Colombia, Fabio Duarte

Stage 5, Fabio Duarte
Stage 8, Aldemar Reyes

Stage 5 Vuelta a Venezuela, Victor Ocampo
Stage 7 Vuelta a Ecuador, Jaime Chacon
2023
Overall Vuelta a San Juan, Miguel Ángel López

Stage 5, Miguel Ángel López

Colombia National Time Trial Championships, Miguel Ángel López
Time Trial, Pan American Championships, Walter Vargas
Overall Vuelta Bantrab, Óscar Sevilla

Stage 1, Óscar Sevilla
Stage 2, Róbigzon Leandro Oyola
Stage 3, Javier Ernesto Jamaica
Stages 4 & 5, Miguel Ángel López

Stage 1 Tour of the Gila, Miguel Ángel López
Stage 3 Tour of the Gila (ITT), Walter Vargas
Stage 5 Tour of the Gila, Óscar Sevilla
Overall Vuelta a Catamarca, Miguel Ángel López

Stage 3, Miguel Ángel López

Stage 4a Vuelta a Formosa Internacional (ITT), Óscar Sevilla
Stage 3 (ITT) Joe Martin Stage Race, Miguel Ángel López
Overall Vuelta a Colombia, Miguel Ángel López

Prologue, Stages 1, 3, 4, 5, 6, 7, 8 & 9 (ITT), Miguel Ángel López

Time trial, CAC Games, Miguel Ángel López
Gran Premio Guatemala, Róbigzon Oyola
Gran Premio Chapin, Javier Jamaica
Overall Tour of Hainan, Óscar Sevilla
Time trial, Pan American Games, Walter Vargas
2024
Overall Jamaica International Cycling Classic, Wilmar Paredes

Stages 1, Wilmar Paredes
Stages 2 & 3, Christian Tamayo

Stages 1 & 5 Tour of the Gila, Wilmar Paredes
Stage 1 Vuelta Bantrab, Wilmar Paredes
Time Trial, Pan American Championships, Walter Vargas
Overall Vuelta a Venezuela, Walter Vargas

Stage 1, David Alejandro Gonzalez
Stage 4 (ITT), Walter Vargas
Stage 5, Javier Jamaica

Stage 1 Vuelta a Guatemala, David Alejandro Gonzalez

== National and continental champions ==
2017
Colombian U23 Time Trial Championship, Julián Cardona
2018
Pan American Time Trial, Walter Vargas
2019
Colombian U23 Time Trial Championship, Harold Tejada
Colombian U23 Road Race Championship, Harold Tejada
2021
Colombian Time Trial Championship, Walter Vargas
Pan American Time Trial, Walter Vargas
2023
Colombian Time Trial Championship, Miguel Ángel López
Pan American Time Trial, Walter Vargas
2024
Pan American Time Trial, Walter Vargas
2025
Pan American Time Trial, Walter Vargas
Pan American Road Race, Álvaro Hodeg
