= Juan Morales (cyclist) =

Colombian cyclist

Personal information
- Born: 19 May 1949 (age 77) Tenza, Colombia

Cycling career
- Sport: Cycling

Juan Morales (born 19 May 1949) is a former Colombian cyclist. He competed in the individual road race at the 1972 Summer Olympics.
