= Vuelta a Colombia =

Cycling stage race

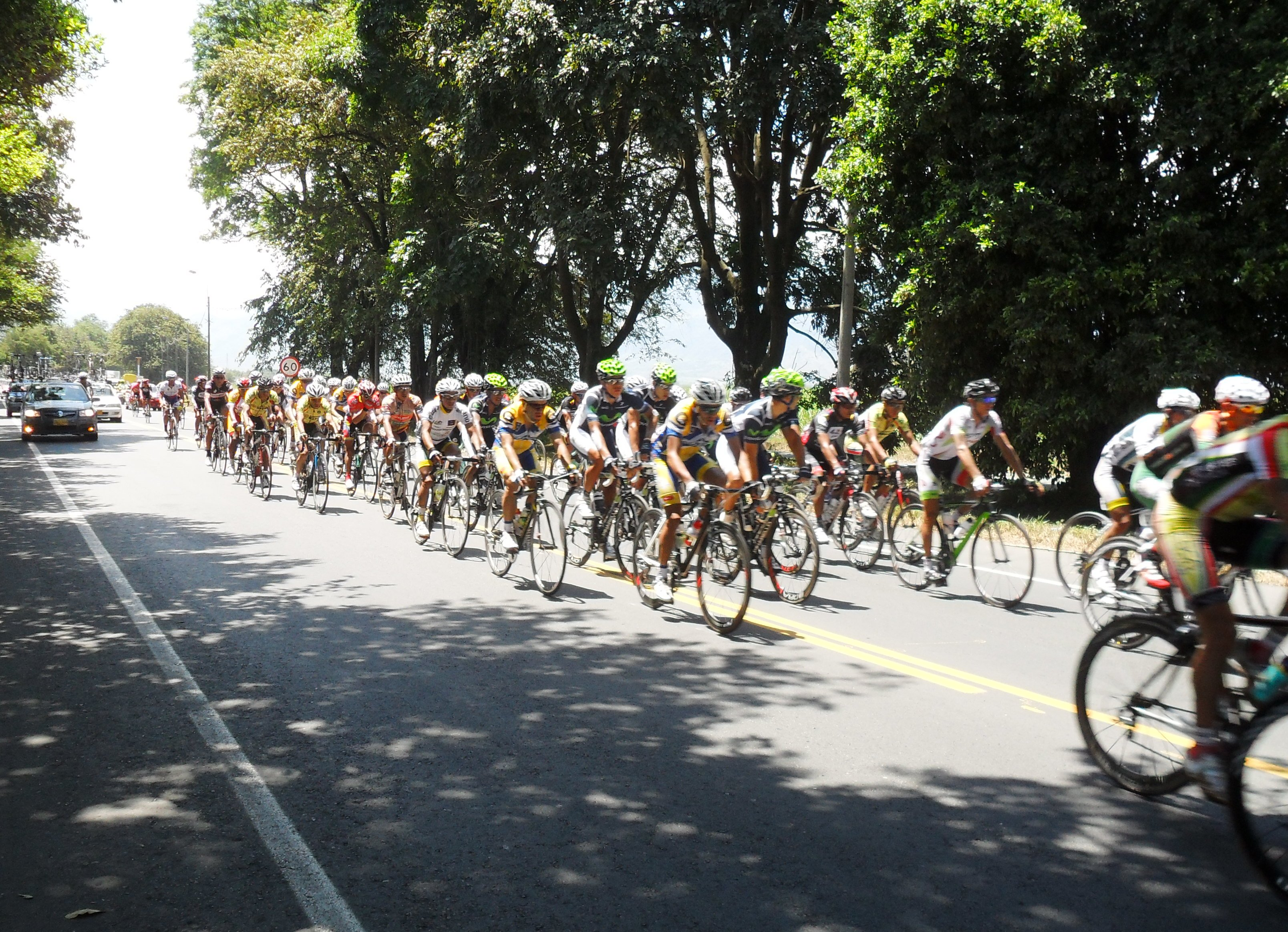
- 2012 Vuelta a Colombia

Race details
- Date: August (until 2020); June (since 2022)
- Region: Colombia
- English name: Tour of Colombia
- Local name: Vuelta a Colombia (in Spanish)
- Discipline: Road race
- Competition: UCI America Tour
- Type: Stage race
- Organiser: Colombian Cycling Federation
- Web site: www.federacioncolombianadeciclismo.com/tag/vuelta-a-colombia/

History
- First edition: 1951
- Editions: 76 (as of 2026)
- First winner: Efraín Forero Triviño (COL)
- Most wins: Rafael Antonio Niño (COL) (6 wins)
- Most recent: Diego Camargo (COL)

The Vuelta a Colombia (Spanish for Tour of Colombia) is an annual cycling road race, run over many stages throughout different regions in Colombia and sometimes Venezuela and Ecuador during the first days of August. It is organized by the Colombian Cycling Federation, and is currently held as a category 2.2 event on the UCI America Tour.

== History ==
The first Vuelta a Colombia was held in 1951 as an idea of Englishman Donald W. Raskin and a few of his friends, emulating the European Tour de France. It was a 1,233 kilometers race which was divided in 10 stages which included three rest days. Thirty-five cyclists lined up for the race and of which thirty finished the race. The first champion of Vuelta was Efraín Forero Triviño who won seven stages of the race. For the second edition, the race was increased in stages to 13 and was around 1,670 km in length. It was held from the 12 to the 27 or 28 January 1952. It appears that 60 cyclists lined up for the race. The 3rd edition of the race was the first edition to have 15 stages that covered 1,750 km.

Over the years, there has been several serious accidents and even deaths during the race. Some of these cyclists, who have had very serious and career-ending accidents, include Conrado "Tito" Gallo, Gilberto Achicanoy, Felipe Liñán and Ernesto Santander. In 2005, there was a tragic accident in Vuelta in which a local radio journalist, Alberto Martínez Prader, died while transmitting the race. Martinez was traveling in a jeep with José Fernando López and Héctor Urrego when, descending from the La Linea peak towards Calarcá, the vehicle lost control on a curve and fell into a ravine.

It is currently a fifteen-stage race that is regarded as one of the toughest races in cycling. The mountain passes that the peloton encounters are hundreds of metres higher than any of the passes used in the Tour de France.

The 2010 edition was won by Sergio Luis Henao of the Indeportes Antioquia–Idea–FLA–Lotería de Medellín Team ahead of teammate Óscar Sevilla and José Rujano, the previous year's winner.

The 2026 edition was prematurely terminated three days before its scheduled conclusion in Medellin on 16 August due to the 2026 Colombia earthquake on 10 August, after five of nine stages and 880 km (550 mi) had been finished. Frontrunner Diego Camargo of Team Medellin EPM was declared the winner.

== Doping ==
On 21 November, 2017, Róbinson López (Lotería de Boyacá), current U23 Colombian champion, tested positive for the third generation blood booster – CERA. A week later, news broke that Luis Alberto Largo (Sogamoso–Argos–Cooservicios–Idrs), Edward Díaz (EPM), Jonathan Felipe Paredes and Fabio Nelson Montenegro (Ebsa–Indeportes Boyacá), Luis Camargo Flechas (Supergiros) and Óscar Soliz (Movistar Amateur Team) had all tested positive for CERA at the 2017 edition of the race.

== Past winners ==
Year	Country	Rider	Team
1951	Colombia	Efraín Forero Triviño	Planta de Soda de Zipaquirá-Cundinamarca
1952	France	José Beyaert	Automoto Valle
1953	Colombia	Ramón Hoyos	Coltejer–Antioquia A
1954	Colombia	Ramón Hoyos	Antioquia Fuerzas Armadas
1955	Colombia	Ramón Hoyos	Coltejer–Antioquia
1956	Colombia	Ramón Hoyos	Antioquia A
1957	Spain	José Gómez del Moral	Spain (national team)
1958	Colombia	Ramón Hoyos	
1959	Colombia	Rubén Darío Gómez	
1960	Colombia	Hernán Medina Calderón	Antioquia-Cervunión
1961	Colombia	Rubén Darío Gómez	Camisas Jarcano
1962	Colombia	Roberto Buitrago	
1963	Colombia	Martín Emilio Rodríguez	Antioquia Blue Bell–Wrangler
1964	Colombia	Martín Emilio Rodríguez	Antioquia A
1965	Colombia	Javier Suárez	Antioquia Suramericana
1966	Colombia	Martín Emilio Rodríguez	
1967	Colombia	Martín Emilio Rodríguez	Antioquia Wrangler-Caribú
1968	Colombia	Pedro Julio Sánchez	Telepostal
1969	Colombia	Pablo Hernández	Pierce Cundinamarca
1970	Colombia	Rafael Antonio Niño	Junta Administradora de Deportes-Cundinamarca
1971	Colombia	Álvaro Pachón	Singer
1972	Colombia	Miguel Samacá	Singer
1973	Colombia	Rafael Antonio Niño	Ferretería Reina
1974	Colombia	Miguel Samacá	Licorera de Cundinamarca
1975	Colombia	Rafael Antonio Niño	Banco Cafetero
1976	Colombia	José Patrocinio Jiménez	Banco Cafetero
1977	Colombia	Rafael Antonio Niño	Banco Cafetero
1978	Colombia	Rafael Antonio Niño	Benotto
1979	Colombia	Alfonso Flórez Ortiz	Freskola A
1980	Colombia	Rafael Antonio Niño	Droguería Yaneth
1981	Colombia	Fabio Parra	Lotería de Boyacá
1982	Colombia	Cristóbal Pérez	Lotería de Boyacá
1983	Colombia	Alfonso Flórez Ortiz	Varta–Colombia
1984	Colombia	Luis Herrera	Varta–Colombia
1985	Colombia	Luis Herrera	Varta–Café de Colombia
1986	Colombia	Luis Herrera	Café de Colombia-Varta
1987	Colombia	Pablo Wilches	Postóbon–Manzana
1988	Colombia	Luis Herrera	Café de Colombia
1989	Colombia	Oliverio Rincón	Castalia
1990	Colombia	Gustavo Wilches	Postóbon–Manzana–Ryalcao
1991	Colombia	Álvaro Sierra	Postóbon–Manzana
1992	Colombia	Fabio Parra	Amaya Seguros
1993	Colombia	Carlos Jaramillo	Aguardiente Antioquena
1994	Colombia	Chepe González	Postóbon–Manzana
1995	Colombia	Chepe González	Kelme–Pony Malta
1996	Colombia	Miguel Ángel Sanabria	Selle Italia–Gaseosas Glacial–Magniflex
1997	Colombia	José Castelblanco	Telecom–Capitel–Kelme
1998	Colombia	José Castelblanco	Avianca–Telecom–Kelme
1999	Colombia	Carlos Alberto Contreras	Kelme–Costa Blanca
2000	Colombia	Héctor Palacio	05 Orbitel
2001	Colombia	Hernán Buenahora	Selle Italia Baterías MAC
2002	Colombia	José Castelblanco	Colombia Selle Italia Alc.Cabimas
2003	Colombia	Libardo Niño	Lotería de Boyacá
2004	Colombia	José Castelblanco	Orbitel-05
2005	Colombia	Libardo Niño	Lotería de Boyacá–Coordinadora
2006	Colombia	José Castelblanco	Gobernación del Zulia–ALC Cabimas
2007	Colombia	Santiago Botero	UNE–Orbitel
2008	Colombia	Giovanny Báez	EPM–UNE
2009	Venezuela	José Rujano	Gobernación del Zulia
2010	Colombia	Sergio Henao	Indeportes Antioquia–Idea–FLA–Lotería de Medellín
2011	Colombia	Félix Cárdenas	GW–Shimano
2012	Colombia	Félix Cárdenas	GW–Shimano
2013	Spain	Óscar Sevilla	EPM–UNE
2014	Spain	Óscar Sevilla	EPM–UNE–Área Metropolitana
2015	Spain	Óscar Sevilla	EPM–UNE–Área Metropolitana
2016	Colombia	Mauricio Ortega	Supergiros–Gane–Redetrans
2017	Colombia	Aristóbulo Cala	Bicicletas Strongman
2018	Ecuador	Jonathan Caicedo	Medellín
2019	Colombia	Fabio Duarte	Medellín
2020	Colombia	Diego Camargo	Colombia Tierra de Atletas–GW Bicicletas
2021	Colombia	José Tito Hernández	Team Medellín
2022	Colombia	Fabio Duarte	Team Medellín–EPM
2023	Colombia	Miguel Ángel López	Team Medellín–EPM
2024	Colombia	Rodrigo Contreras	Nu Colombia
2025	Colombia	Rodrigo Contreras	Nu Colombia
2026	Colombia	Diego Camargo	Team Medellín–EPM

== See also ==
- Vuelta a Colombia Femenina Oro y Paz
