= 2019 UCI America Tour =

Bicycle competition

- Fourteenth edition of the UCI America Tour

Details
- Dates: October 23, 2018–October 12, 2019
- Location: North America and South America
- Races: 25

Champions
- Individual champion: (Colombia) Egan Bernal (Netcompany–Ineos)
- Teams' champion: (Colombia) Team Medellín–EPM
- Nations' champion: Colombia

The 2019 UCI America Tour was the fifteenth season of the UCI America Tour. The season began on October 23, 2018 with the Vuelta a Guatemala and ended on 12 October 2019.

The points leader, based on the cumulative results of previous races, wears the UCI America Tour cycling jersey. Throughout the season, points are awarded to the top finishers of stages within stage races and the final general classification standings of each of the stages races and one-day events. The quality and complexity of a race also determines how many points are awarded to the top finishers, the higher the UCI rating of a race, the more points are awarded.

The UCI ratings from highest to lowest are as follows:

- Multi-day events: 2.HC, 2.1 and 2.2
- One-day events: 1.HC, 1.1 and 1.2

== Events ==
=== 2018 ===
Date	Race Name	Location	UCI Rating	Winner	Team	Ref
October 23 – November 1	Vuelta a Guatemala	Guatemala	2.2	Alfredo Ajpacajá (GUA)	Decorabaños	
November 15–20	Vuelta Michoacán	Mexico	2.2	Nicolás Paredes (COL)	Medellín	
December 12	Gran Premio FECOCI	Costa Rica	1.2	William Muñoz (COL)	Bicicletas Strongman–Colombia Coldeportes	
December 13	Gran Premio Comite Olímpico Nacional	Costa Rica	1.2	Óscar Quiroz (COL)	Bicicletas Strongman–Colombia Coldeportes	
December 16–25	Vuelta a Costa Rica	Costa Rica	2.2	Bryan Salas (CRC)	Nestlé-7C-CBZ Asfaltos-Giant	

=== 2019 ===
Date	Race Name	Location	UCI Rating	Winner	Team	Ref
January 11–18	Vuelta al Táchira	Venezuela	2.2	Jimmi Briceño (VEN)	La Viña-Grupo MG-Ferlab-Inversiones Alexander	
January 27 – February 3	Vuelta a San Juan	Argentina	2.1	Winner Anacona (COL)	Movistar Team	
February 12–17	Tour Colombia	Colombia	2.1	Miguel Ángel López (COL)	Astana	
February 25 – March 3	Vuelta Independencia Nacional	Dominican Republic	2.2	Robinson Chalapud (COL)	Medellín	
March 6–10	Vuelta a Chiloé	Chile	2.2	Óscar Sevilla (ESP)	Medellín	
April 4–7	Joe Martin Stage Race	United States	2.2	Stephen Bassett (USA)	First Internet Bank Cycling Team	
April 12–21	Vuelta del Uruguay	Uruguay	2.2	Walter Vargas (COL)	Medellín	
May 1–5	Tour of the Gila	United States	2.2	James Piccoli (CAN)	Elevate–KHS Pro Cycling	
May 27	Winston-Salem Cycling Classic	United States	1.1	Ulises Alfredo Castillo (MEX)	Wildlife Generation Pro Cycling	
June 13–16	Grand Prix Cycliste de Saguenay	Canada	2.2	Nicolas Zukowsky (CAN)	Floyd's Pro Cycling	
June 19–23	Tour de Beauce	Canada	2.2	Brendan Rhim (USA)	Arapahoe Resources–BMC	
July 7	Delta Road Race	Canada	1.2	Sam Bassetti (USA)	Elevate–Webiplex Pro Cycling	
July 9–14	Vuelta Ciclista a Miranda	Venezuela	2.2	Wilson Haro (ECU)	Movistar Team Ecuador	
July 12	Chrono Kristin Armstrong	United States	1.2	Serghei Țvetcov (ROU)	Floyd's Pro Cycling	
July 13	Gran Premio Guatemala	Guatemala	1.2	Julián Yac (GUA)	Decorabaños	
July 15	Gran Premio Chapin	Guatemala	1.2	Bryan Rios (GUA)	ADD Quiché	
July 17–24	Vuelta a Venezuela	Venezuela	2.2	Orluis Aular (VEN)	Matrix Powertag	
August 2–11	Tour cycliste international de la Guadeloupe	Guadeloupe	2.2	Adrien Guillonnet (FRA)	Interpro Cycling Academy	
August 12–18	Tour of Utah	United States	2.HC	Ben Hermans (BEL)	Israel Cycling Academy	
October 5–12	Vuelta al Ecuador	Ecuador	2.2	Canceled		

== Final standings ==
=== Individual classification ===
Rank	Name	Points
1.	Egan Bernal (COL)	2846.75
2.	Nairo Quintana (COL)	1845
3.	Richard Carapaz (ECU)	1607
4.	Miguel Ángel López (COL)	1600.5
5.	Michael Woods (CAN)	1259
6.	Sergio Higuita (COL)	1222.5
7.	Rigoberto Urán (COL)	949.83
8.	Fernando Gaviria (COL)	748
9.	Álvaro Hodeg (COL)	649.63
10.	Tejay van Garderen (USA)	575.5

=== Team classification ===
Rank	Team	Points
1.	(Colombia) Medellín	1409.16
2.	(United States) Rally UHC Cycling	1339
3.	(Canada) Floyd's Pro Cycling	1106
4.	(United States) Hagens Berman Axeon	1069.33
5.	(Mexico) Canel's–Specialized	809
6.	(Colombia) Team Manzana Postobón	784
7.	(United States) Elevate–KHS Pro Cycling	743
8.	Movistar Team Ecuador	674
9.	(Colombia) Coldeportes Bicicletas Strongman	460
10.	(Brazil) São Francisco Saùde / Klabin / SME Ribeirão Preto	329
11.	(United States) Team Illuminate	327
12.	(Colombia) Coldeportes–Zenú	325
13.	(United States) Aevolo	246
14.	(Colombia) GW–Shimano	200
15.	(Dominican Republic) Inteja Imca–Ridea	199
16.	(United States) Team Novo Nordisk	187.67
17.	(United States) Hagens Berman Axeon	183
18.	(Argentina) A.C. Agrupación Virgen de Fátima	180
19.	(Canada) DCBank Pro Cycling Team	175
20.	(Bolivia) Start Cycling Team	111
21.	(Argentina) Sindicato de Empleados Publicos de San Juan	103
22.	(Colombia) EPM	75
23.	(United States) Wildlife Generation Pro Cycling p/b Maxxis	51
24.	(United States) 303 Project	33
25.	(Colombia) Orgullo Paisa	31
26.	(Bolivia) Deprisa Team	23
27.	(Argentina) Equipo Continental Municipalidad de Pocito	15
28.	(Colombia) BetPlay Cycling Team	11
29.	(Argentina) Asociación Civil Mardan	10
30.	(Argentina) Municipalidad de Rawson	3

=== Nation classification ===
Rank	Nation	Points
1.	Colombia	10344.21
2.	Ecuador	3070.64
3.	Canada	2833.71
4.	United States	2351.75
5.	Costa Rica	1032
6.	Venezuela	912
7.	Argentina	835.95
8.	Mexico	792
9.	Guatemala	792
10.	Chile	650
11.	Brazil	632
12.	Panama	604
13.	Dominican Republic	378
14.	Peru	365
15.	Cuba	273
16.	El Salvador	233
17.	Belize	223
18.	Puerto Rico	180
19.	Uruguay	153
20.	Bermuda	145
21.	Bahamas	105
22.	Honduras	80
23.	Saint Vincent and the Grenadines	80
24.	Curaçao	75
25.	British Virgin Islands	45
26.	Nicaragua	8
27.	Bolivia	8
28.	Trinidad and Tobago	3
