= 2019 Tour Colombia =

2019 UCI America Tour
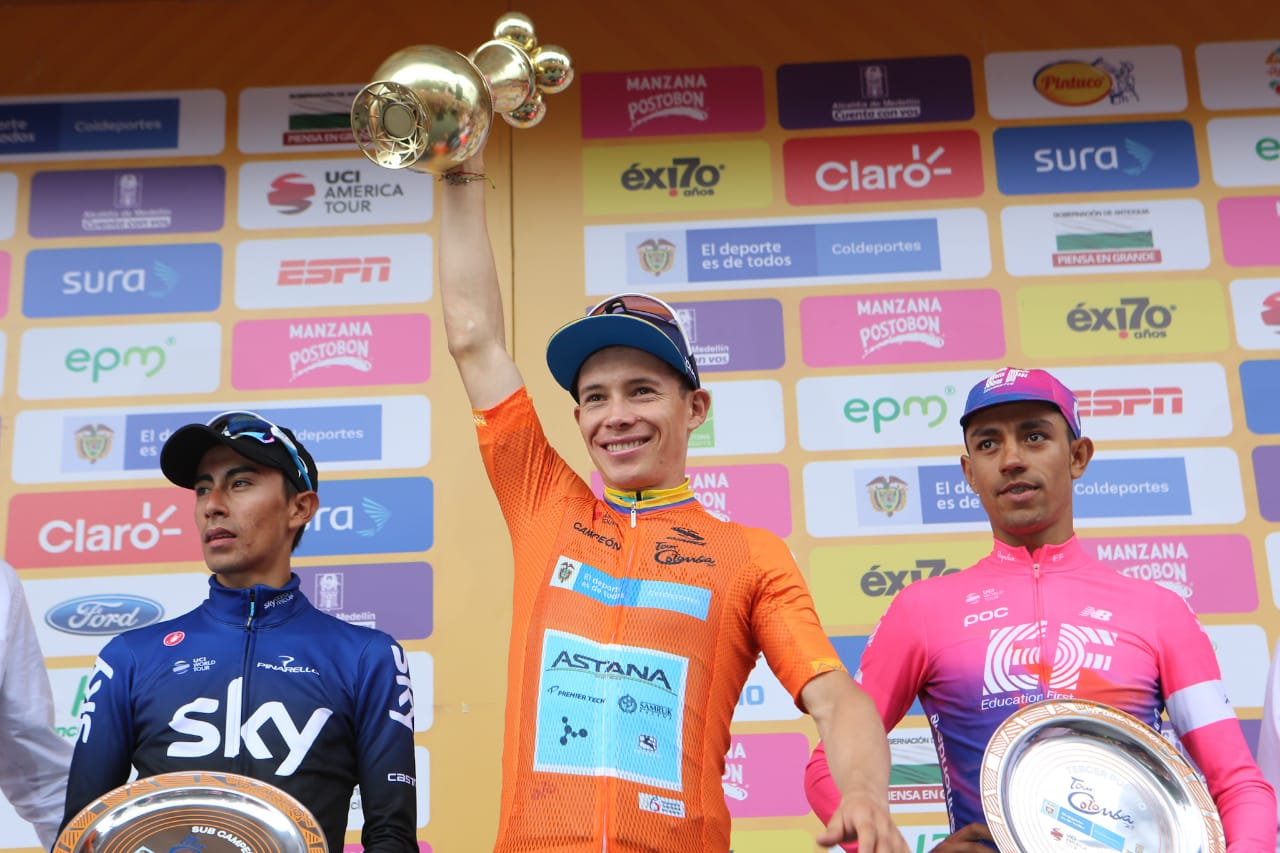

Race details
- Dates: February 12–17, 2019
- Winning time: 18h 38' 32"

Results
Jersey awarded to the overall winner	Winner	Miguel Ángel López (COL)	(Astana)
	Second	Iván Sosa (COL)	(Team Sky)
	Third	Daniel Martínez (COL)	(EF Education First)
Jersey awarded to the points classification winner	Points	Julian Alaphilippe (FRA)	(Deceuninck–Quick-Step)
Jersey awarded to the mountains classification winner	Mountains	Iván Sosa (COL)	(Team Sky)
Jersey awarded to the young rider classification winner	Young rider	Miguel Ángel López (COL)	(Astana)
	Sprints	Óscar Sevilla (ESP)	(Medellín)
	Team	EF Education First	

The 2019 Tour Colombia was a road cycling stage race that took place in Colombia between 12 and 17 February 2019. It was the second edition of the Tour Colombia, and was rated as a 2.1 event as part of the UCI America Tour. Miguel Angel Lopez won for Team Astana.

== Teams ==
Twenty-eight teams were invited to start the race. These included six UCI WorldTeams, 7 UCI Professional Continental teams, 12 UCI Continental teams and three national teams. Each team had a maximum of six riders:

UCI WorldTeams

- Astana
- EF Education First
- Deceuninck–Quick-Step
- Movistar Team
- UAE Team Emirates
- Team Sky

UCI Professional Continental teams

- Androni Giocattoli–Sidermec
- Hagens Berman Axeon
- Team Manzana Postobón
- Nippo–Vini Fantini–Faizanè
- Bardiani–CSF
- Israel Cycling Academy
- Neri Sottoli–Selle Italia–KTM

UCI Continental teams

- Aevolo
- Coldeportes Bicicletas Strongman
- Deprisa Team
- EPM
- IAM–Excelsior
- Orgullo Paisa
- Coldeportes–Zenú
- Efapel
- GW–Shimano
- Medellín
- Team Illuminate
- BetPlay Cycling Team

National teams

- Italy
- Colombia
- Ecuador

== Route ==
Stage characteristics and winners
Stage	Date	Course	Distance	Type	Stage winner
1	February 12	Medellín to Medellín	14 km (8.7 mi)	Team time trial	EF Education First
2	February 13	La Ceja to La Ceja	150.5 km (93.5 mi)	Flat stage	Álvaro Hodeg (COL)
3	February 14	Llanogrande to Llanogrande	167.6 km (104.1 mi)	Flat stage	Juan Sebastián Molano (COL)
4	February 15	Medellín to Medellín	144 km (89 mi)	Flat stage	Bob Jungels (LUX)
5	February 16	La Unión to La Unión	176.8 km (109.9 mi)	Medium mountain stage	Julian Alaphilippe (FRA)
6	February 17	El Retiro to Alto de Palmas	173.8 km (108.0 mi)	Mountain stage	Nairo Quintana (COL)

== Stages ==
=== Stage 1 ===
Stage 1 result

Rank	Team	Time
1	EF Education First	15' 05"
2	Deceuninck–Quick-Step	+ 8"
3	Team Sky	+ 10"
4	Astana	+ 22"
5	UAE Team Emirates	+ 35"
6	Medellín	+ 40"
7	Movistar Team	+ 44"
8	EPM	+ 52"
9	Coldeportes Bicicletas Strongman	+ 53"
10	Team Manzana Postobón	+ 54"

General classification after Stage 1

Rank	Rider	Team	Time
1	Rigoberto Urán (COL)	EF Education First	15' 05"
2	Daniel Martínez (COL)	EF Education First	s.t.
3	Lawson Craddock (USA)	EF Education First	s.t.
4	Taylor Phinney (USA)	EF Education First	s.t.
5	Bob Jungels (LUX)	Deceuninck–Quick-Step	+ 8"
6	Julian Alaphilippe (FRA)	Deceuninck–Quick-Step	s.t.
7	Maximiliano Richeze (ARG)	Deceuninck–Quick-Step	s.t.
8	Álvaro Hodeg (COL)	Deceuninck–Quick-Step	s.t.
9	Jhonatan Narváez (ECU)	Team Sky	+ 10"
10	Iván Sosa (COL)	Team Sky	s.t.

=== Stage 2 ===
Stage 2 result

Rank	Rider	Team	Time
1	Álvaro Hodeg (COL)	Deceuninck–Quick-Step	3h 21' 40"
2	Martin Laas (EST)	Team Illuminate	s.t.
3	Juan Sebastián Molano (COL)	UAE Team Emirates	s.t.
4	Mihkel Räim (EST)	Israel Cycling Academy	s.t.
5	Maximiliano Richeze (ARG)	Deceuninck–Quick-Step	s.t.
6	Luca Pacioni (ITA)	Sport Vlaanderen–Baloise	s.t.
7	Imerio Cima (ITA)	Neri Sottoli–Selle Italia–KTM	s.t.
8	Paolo Simion (ITA)	Bardiani–CSF	s.t.
9	Egan Bernal (COL)	Team Sky	s.t.
10	Jhonatan Narváez (ECU)	Team Sky	s.t.

General classification after Stage 2

Rank	Rider	Team	Time
1	Álvaro Hodeg (COL)	Deceuninck–Quick-Step	3h 36' 43"
2	Rigoberto Urán (COL)	EF Education First	+ 2"
3	Daniel Martínez (COL)	EF Education First	s.t.
4	Lawson Craddock (USA)	EF Education First	s.t.
5	Maximiliano Richeze (ARG)	Deceuninck–Quick-Step	+ 10"
6	Julian Alaphilippe (FRA)	Deceuninck–Quick-Step	s.t.
7	Bob Jungels (LUX)	Deceuninck–Quick-Step	s.t.
8	Jhonatan Narváez (ECU)	Team Sky	+ 12"
9	Egan Bernal (COL)	Team Sky	s.t.
10	Iván Sosa (COL)	Team Sky	s.t.

=== Stage 3 ===
Stage 3 result

Rank	Rider	Team	Time
1	Juan Sebastián Molano (COL)	UAE Team Emirates	3h 42' 52"
2	Julian Alaphilippe (FRA)	Deceuninck–Quick-Step	s.t.
3	Diego Ochoa (COL)	Team Manzana Postobón	s.t.
4	Miguel Ángel López (COL)	Astana	s.t.
5	Egan Bernal (COL)	Team Sky	s.t.
6	Edwin Ávila (COL)	Israel Cycling Academy	s.t.
7	Miguel Flórez (COL)	Androni Giocattoli–Sidermec	s.t.
8	Juan Arango (COL)	Colombia	s.t.
9	Richard Carapaz (ECU)	Movistar Team	s.t.
10	Edison Muñoz (COL)	Orgullo Paisa	s.t.

General classification after Stage 3

Rank	Rider	Team	Time
1	Rigoberto Urán (COL)	EF Education First	7h 19' 30"
2	Daniel Martínez (COL)	EF Education First	s.t.
3	Lawson Craddock (USA)	EF Education First	s.t.
4	Julian Alaphilippe (FRA)	Deceuninck–Quick-Step	s.t.
5	Egan Bernal (COL)	Team Sky	+ 10"
6	Bob Jungels (LUX)	Deceuninck–Quick-Step	s.t.
7	Jhonatan Narváez (ECU)	Team Sky	s.t.
8	Iván Sosa (COL)	Team Sky	s.t.
9	Chris Froome (GBR)	Team Sky	s.t.
10	Sebastián Henao (COL)	Team Sky	s.t.

=== Stage 4 ===
Stage 4 result

Rank	Rider	Team	Time
1	Bob Jungels (LUX)	Deceuninck–Quick-Step	3h 04' 38"
2	Mihkel Räim (EST)	Israel Cycling Academy	+ 2"
3	Julian Alaphilippe (FRA)	Deceuninck–Quick-Step	s.t.
4	Esteban Villareal (ECU)	Ecuador	s.t.
5	Hideto Nakane (JPN)	Nippo–Vini Fantini–Faizanè	s.t.
6	Diego Ochoa (COL)	Team Manzana Postobón	s.t.
7	Weimar Roldán (COL)	Medellín	s.t.
8	Edwin Ávila (COL)	Israel Cycling Academy	s.t.
9	Miguel Flórez (COL)	Androni Giocattoli–Sidermec	s.t.
10	Daniel Muñoz (COL)	Androni Giocattoli–Sidermec	s.t.

General classification after Stage 4

Rank	Rider	Team	Time
1	Bob Jungels (LUX)	Deceuninck–Quick-Step	10h 24' 10"
2	Julian Alaphilippe (FRA)	Deceuninck–Quick-Step	s.t.
3	Rigoberto Urán (COL)	EF Education First	s.t.
4	Daniel Martínez (COL)	EF Education First	s.t.
5	Lawson Craddock (USA)	EF Education First	s.t.
6	Egan Bernal (COL)	Team Sky	+ 10"
7	Jhonatan Narváez (ECU)	Team Sky	s.t.
8	Iván Sosa (COL)	Team Sky	s.t.
9	Sebastián Henao (COL)	Team Sky	s.t.
10	Miguel Ángel López (COL)	Astana	+ 20"

=== Stage 5 ===
Stage 5 result

Rank	Rider	Team	Time
1	Julian Alaphilippe (FRA)	Deceuninck–Quick-Step	4h 16' 44"
2	Miguel Ángel López (COL)	Astana	s.t.
3	Richard Carapaz (ECU)	Movistar Team	s.t.
4	Daniel Martínez (COL)	EF Education First	s.t.
5	Iván Sosa (COL)	Team Sky	+ 6"
6	Bob Jungels (LUX)	Deceuninck–Quick-Step	+ 42"
7	Rigoberto Urán (COL)	EF Education First	s.t.
8	Alejandro Osorio (COL)	Nippo–Vini Fantini–Faizanè	s.t.
9	Nairo Quintana (COL)	Movistar Team	s.t.
10	Egan Bernal (COL)	Team Sky	s.t.

General classification after Stage 5

Rank	Rider	Team	Time
1	Julian Alaphilippe (FRA)	Deceuninck–Quick-Step	14h 40' 46"
2	Daniel Martínez (COL)	EF Education First	+ 8"
3	Miguel Ángel López (COL)	Astana	+ 23"
4	Iván Sosa (COL)	Team Sky	+ 29"
5	Bob Jungels (LUX)	Deceuninck–Quick-Step	+ 53"
6	Richard Carapaz (ECU)	Movistar Team	+ 55"
7	Rigoberto Urán (COL)	EF Education First	+ 57"
8	Lawson Craddock (USA)	EF Education First	s.t.
9	Egan Bernal (COL)	Team Sky	+ 1' 05"
10	Óscar Sevilla (ESP)	Medellín	+ 1' 27"

=== Stage 6 ===
Stage 6 result

Rank	Rider	Team	Time
1	Nairo Quintana (COL)	Movistar Team	3h 57' 19"
2	Iván Sosa (COL)	Team Sky	+ 8"
3	Miguel Ángel López (COL)	Astana	s.t.
4	Egan Bernal (COL)	Team Sky	+ 16"
5	Rigoberto Urán (COL)	EF Education First	+ 1' 01"
6	Daniel Martínez (COL)	EF Education First	s.t.
7	Jhojan García (COL)	Team Manzana Postobón	+ 1' 27"
8	Didier Chaparro (COL)	Orgullo Paisa	+ 1' 32"
9	Sergio Henao (COL)	UAE Team Emirates	+ 1' 36"
10	Jhonatan Narváez (ECU)	Team Sky	+ 1' 40"

== Final standings ==
Final general classification

Rank	Rider	Team	Time
1	Miguel Ángel López (COL)	Astana	18h 38' 32"
2	Iván Sosa (COL)	Team Sky	+ 4"
3	Daniel Martínez (COL)	EF Education First	+ 42"
4	Egan Bernal (COL)	Team Sky	+ 54"
5	Nairo Quintana (COL)	Movistar Team	+ 1' 04"
6	Rigoberto Urán (COL)	EF Education First	+ 1' 31"
7	Julian Alaphilippe (FRA)	Deceuninck–Quick-Step	+ 1' 33"
8	Sergio Henao (COL)	UAE Team Emirates	+ 2' 41"
9	Richard Carapaz (ECU)	Movistar Team	+ 2' 46"
10	Rodrigo Contreras (COL)	Astana	+ 2' 47"

Final points classification

Rank	Rider	Team	Points
1	Julian Alaphilippe (FRA)	Deceuninck–Quick-Step	40
2	Miguel Ángel López (COL)	Astana	38
3	Juan Sebastián Molano (COL)	UAE Team Emirates	25
4	Egan Bernal (COL)	Team Sky	22
5	Bob Jungels (LUX)	Deceuninck–Quick-Step	21
6	Iván Sosa (COL)	Team Sky	21
7	Daniel Martínez (COL)	EF Education First	21
8	Diego Ochoa (COL)	Team Manzana Postobón	19
9	Nairo Quintana (COL)	Movistar Team	18
10	Álvaro Hodeg (COL)	Deceuninck–Quick-Step	18

Final mountains classification

Rank	Rider	Team	Points
1	Iván Sosa (COL)	Team Sky	13
2	Miguel Ángel López (COL)	Astana	12
3	Alexis Camacho (COL)	Coldeportes–Zenú	12
4	Nairo Quintana (COL)	Movistar Team	10
5	Daniel Martínez (COL)	EF Education First	7
6	Óscar Quiroz (COL)	Coldeportes Bicicletas Strongman	7
7	William Muñoz (COL)	Coldeportes Bicicletas Strongman	6
8	José Tito Hernández (COL)	Orgullo Paisa	4
9	Egan Bernal (COL)	Team Sky	4
10	Fabio Duarte (COL)	Medellín	4

Final young rider classification

Rank	Rider	Team	Time
1	Miguel Ángel López (COL)	Astana	18h 38' 32"
2	Iván Sosa (COL)	Team Sky	+ 4"
3	Daniel Martínez (COL)	EF Education First	+ 42"
4	Egan Bernal (COL)	Team Sky	+ 54"
5	Rodrigo Contreras (COL)	Astana	+ 2' 47"
6	Alejandro Osorio (COL)	Nippo–Vini Fantini–Faizanè	+ 3' 31"
7	Óscar Quiroz (COL)	Coldeportes Bicicletas Strongman	+ 3' 40"
8	Miguel Flórez (COL)	Androni Giocattoli–Sidermec	+ 4' 05"
9	Jefferson Cepeda (ECU)	Ecuador	+ 4' 14"
10	Harold Tejada (COL)	Medellín	+ 4' 44"

Final teams classification

Rank	Team	Time
1	EF Education First	55h 31' 37"
2	Movistar Team	+ 2"
3	Team Sky	+ 2' 35"
4	Medellín	+ 5' 21"
5	Coldeportes Bicicletas Strongman	+ 5' 37"
6	Astana	+ 19' 31"
7	Orgullo Paisa	+ 24' 16"
8	EPM	+ 25' 06"
9	Team Manzana Postobón	+ 32' 47"
10	Ecuador	+ 42' 50"
