= 2018 Colombia Oro y Paz =

2018 UCI America Tour
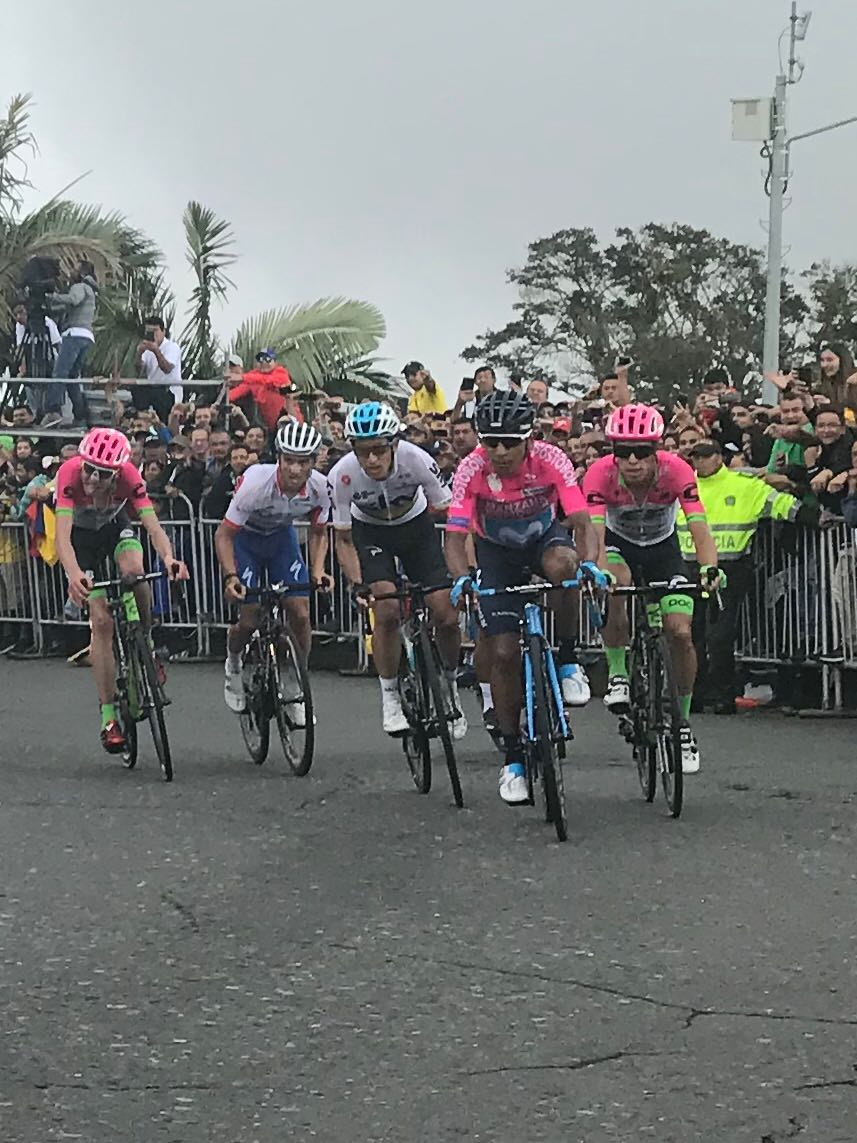

Race details
- Dates: 6–11 February 2018
- Stages: 6
- Winning time: 20h 49' 03"

Results
Jersey awarded to the overall winner	Winner	Egan Bernal (COL)	(Team Sky)
	Second	Nairo Quintana (COL)	(Movistar Team)
	Third	Rigoberto Urán (COL)	(EF Education First–Drapac p/b Cannondale)
Jersey awarded to the points classification winner	Points	Fernando Gaviria (COL)	(Quick-Step Floors)
Jersey awarded to the mountains classification winner	Mountains	Egan Bernal (COL)	(Team Sky)
Jersey awarded to the young rider classification winner	Young rider	Egan Bernal (COL)	(Team Sky)
	Sprints	Miguel Ángel Rubiano (COL)	(Coldeportes–Zenú–Sello Rojo)
	Team	Team Sky	

The 2018 Colombia Oro y Paz was a road cycling stage race that took place in Colombia between 6 and 11 February 2018. It was the first edition of the Colombia Oro y Paz, and was rated as a 2.1 event as part of the UCI America Tour.

The race was won by Colombian Egan Bernal of Team Sky.

== Teams ==
Twenty-five teams started the race. Each team had a maximum of six riders:

UCI WorldTeams

- EF Education First–Drapac p/b Cannondale
- Quick-Step Floors
- Movistar Team
- Team Sky

UCI Professional Continental teams

- Androni Giocattoli–Sidermec
- Burgos BH
- Euskadi–Murias
- Israel Cycling Academy
- UnitedHealthcare
- Bardiani–CSF
- CCC–Sprandi–Polkowice
- Holowesko Citadel p/b Arapahoe Resources
- Team Manzana Postobón

UCI Continental teams

- A.C. Agrupación Virgen de Fátima
- Coldeportes–Zenú–Sello Rojo
- GW–Shimano
- Medellín
- Trevigiani Phonix–Hemus 1896
- Bicicletas Strongman–Colombia Coldeportes
- EPM
- Team Illuminate
- Orgullo Paisa

National teams

- Italy
- Colombia
- Russia

== Route ==
Stage characteristics and winners
Stage	Date	Course	Distance	Type	Stage winner
1	6 February	Palmira to Palmira	99.9 km (62.1 mi)	Flat stage	Fernando Gaviria (COL)
2	7 February	Palmira to Palmira	183.4 km (114.0 mi)	Hilly stage	Fernando Gaviria (COL)
3	8 February	Palmira to Buga	163.2 km (101.4 mi)	Flat stage	Fernando Gaviria (COL)
4	9 February	Buga to Santa Rosa de Cabal	149.5 km (92.9 mi)	Medium mountain stage	Julian Alaphilippe (FRA)
5	10 February	Pereira to Salento	160.8 km (99.9 mi)	Medium mountain stage	Rigoberto Urán (COL)
6	11 February	Armenia to Manizales	184.3 km (114.5 mi)	Mountain stage	Dayer Quintana (COL)

== Stages ==
=== Stage 1 ===
Stage 1 result

Rank	Rider	Team	Time
1	Fernando Gaviria (COL)	Quick-Step Floors	2h 07' 05"
2	Juan Sebastián Molano (COL)	Team Manzana Postobón	s.t.
3	Maximiliano Richeze (ARG)	Quick-Step Floors	s.t.
4	Matteo Malucelli (ITA)	Androni Giocattoli–Sidermec	s.t.
5	Álvaro Hodeg (COL)	Quick-Step Floors	s.t.
6	Andrea Guardini (ITA)	Bardiani–CSF	s.t.
7	Paweł Franczak (POL)	CCC–Sprandi–Polkowice	s.t.
8	Davide Viganò (ITA)	Italy	s.t.
9	Manuel Peñalver (ESP)	Trevigiani Phonix–Hemus 1896	s.t.
10	Miguel Bryon (USA)	Holowesko Citadel p/b Arapahoe Resources	s.t.

General classification after Stage 1

Rank	Rider	Team	Time
1	Fernando Gaviria (COL)	Quick-Step Floors	2h 06' 55"
2	Miguel Ángel Rubiano (COL)	Coldeportes–Zenú–Sello Rojo	+ 1"
3	Juan Sebastián Molano (COL)	Team Manzana Postobón	+ 4"
4	Maximiliano Richeze (ARG)	Quick-Step Floors	+ 6"
5	Rafael Montiel (COL)	Orgullo Paisa	+ 7"
6	Simon Pellaud (SUI)	Team Illuminate	s.t.
7	Jetse Bol (NED)	Team Manzana Postobón	+ 8"
8	Jonathan Clarke (AUS)	UnitedHealthcare	+ 9"
9	Matteo Malucelli (ITA)	Androni Giocattoli–Sidermec	+ 10"
10	Álvaro Hodeg (COL)	Quick-Step Floors	s.t.

=== Stage 2 ===
Stage 2 result

Rank	Rider	Team	Time
1	Fernando Gaviria (COL)	Quick-Step Floors	3h 49' 30"
2	Juan Sebastián Molano (COL)	Team Manzana Postobón	s.t.
3	Matteo Malucelli (ITA)	Androni Giocattoli–Sidermec	s.t.
4	Andrea Guardini (ITA)	Bardiani–CSF	s.t.
5	Mihkel Räim (EST)	Israel Cycling Academy	s.t.
6	Davide Viganò (ITA)	Italy	s.t.
7	Martin Laas (EST)	Team Illuminate	s.t.
8	John Murphy (USA)	Holowesko Citadel p/b Arapahoe Resources	s.t.
9	Jairo Salas (COL)	EPM	s.t.
10	Manuel Peñalver (ESP)	Trevigiani Phonix–Hemus 1896	s.t.

General classification after Stage 2

Rank	Rider	Team	Time
1	Fernando Gaviria (COL)	Quick-Step Floors	5h 56' 12"
2	Juan Sebastián Molano (COL)	Team Manzana Postobón	+ 11"
3	Miguel Ángel Rubiano (COL)	Coldeportes–Zenú–Sello Rojo	+ 14"
4	Juan Arango (COL)	Colombia	+ 17"
5	Matteo Malucelli (ITA)	Androni Giocattoli–Sidermec	+ 19"
6	Maximiliano Richeze (ARG)	Quick-Step Floors	s.t.
7	Simon Pellaud (SUI)	Team Illuminate	+ 20"
8	Rafael Montiel (COL)	Orgullo Paisa	s.t.
9	Nicolás Tivani (ARG)	Trevigiani Phonix–Hemus 1896	s.t.
10	Andrea Guardini (ITA)	Bardiani–CSF	+ 21"

=== Stage 3 ===
Stage 3 result

Rank	Rider	Team	Time
1	Fernando Gaviria (COL)	Quick-Step Floors	3h 30' 05"
2	Matteo Malucelli (ITA)	Androni Giocattoli–Sidermec	s.t.
3	Juan Sebastián Molano (COL)	Team Manzana Postobón	s.t.
4	Davide Viganò (ITA)	Italy	s.t.
5	Lucas Sebastián Haedo (ARG)	UnitedHealthcare	s.t.
6	Maximiliano Richeze (ARG)	Quick-Step Floors	s.t.
7	Christian Tamayo (COL)	GW–Shimano	s.t.
8	Manuel Peñalver (ESP)	Trevigiani Phonix–Hemus 1896	s.t.
9	Nicolás Naranjo (ARG)	A.C. Agrupación Virgen de Fátima	s.t.
10	Adrián González (ESP)	Burgos BH	s.t.

General classification after Stage 3

Rank	Rider	Team	Time
1	Fernando Gaviria (COL)	Quick-Step Floors	9h 26' 07"
2	Juan Sebastián Molano (COL)	Team Manzana Postobón	+ 17"
3	Matteo Malucelli (ITA)	Androni Giocattoli–Sidermec	+ 23"
4	Rafael Montiel (COL)	Orgullo Paisa	+ 24"
5	Miguel Ángel Rubiano (COL)	Coldeportes–Zenú–Sello Rojo	s.t.
6	Brayan Ramírez (COL)	Colombia	+ 26"
7	Juan Arango (COL)	Colombia	+ 27"
8	Maximiliano Richeze (ARG)	Quick-Step Floors	+ 29"
9	Simon Pellaud (SUI)	Team Illuminate	+ 30"
10	Nicolás Tivani (ARG)	Trevigiani Phonix–Hemus 1896	s.t.

=== Stage 4 ===
Stage 4 result

Rank	Rider	Team	Time
1	Julian Alaphilippe (FRA)	Quick-Step Floors	3h 17' 36"
2	Sergio Henao (COL)	Team Sky	s.t.
3	Nairo Quintana (COL)	Movistar Team	s.t.
4	Rigoberto Urán (COL)	EF Education First–Drapac p/b Cannondale	+ 3"
5	Jhonatan Narváez (ECU)	Quick-Step Floors	s.t.
6	Egan Bernal (COL)	Team Sky	s.t.
7	Iván Sosa (COL)	Androni Giocattoli–Sidermec	s.t.
8	Danny Osorio (COL)	Orgullo Paisa	+ 8"
9	Diego Ochoa (COL)	EPM	s.t.
10	Aristóbulo Cala (COL)	Bicicletas Strongman–Colombia Coldeportes	+ 11"

General classification after Stage 4

Rank	Rider	Team	Time
1	Julian Alaphilippe (FRA)	Quick-Step Floors	12h 44' 06"
2	Sergio Henao (COL)	Team Sky	+ 4"
3	Nairo Quintana (COL)	Movistar Team	+ 6"
4	Egan Bernal (COL)	Team Sky	+ 13"
5	Rigoberto Urán (COL)	EF Education First–Drapac p/b Cannondale	s.t.
6	Iván Sosa (COL)	Androni Giocattoli–Sidermec	s.t.
7	Jhonatan Narváez (ECU)	Quick-Step Floors	s.t.
8	Danny Osorio (COL)	Orgullo Paisa	+ 18"
9	Diego Ochoa (COL)	EPM	s.t.
10	Taylor Eisenhart (USA)	Holowesko Citadel p/b Arapahoe Resources	+ 21"

=== Stage 5 ===
Stage 5 result

Rank	Rider	Team	Time
1	Rigoberto Urán (COL)	EF Education First–Drapac p/b Cannondale	3h 42' 33"
2	Nairo Quintana (COL)	Movistar Team	s.t.
3	Egan Bernal (COL)	Team Sky	s.t.
4	Sergio Henao (COL)	Team Sky	s.t.
5	Iván Sosa (COL)	Androni Giocattoli–Sidermec	+ 17"
6	Daniel Martínez (COL)	EF Education First–Drapac p/b Cannondale	s.t.
7	Jhonatan Narváez (ECU)	Quick-Step Floors	+ 29"
8	Óscar Sevilla (ESP)	Medellín	s.t.
9	Aristóbulo Cala (COL)	Bicicletas Strongman–Colombia Coldeportes	+ 34"
10	Richard Carapaz (ECU)	Movistar Team	+ 37"

General classification after Stage 5

Rank	Rider	Team	Time
1	Nairo Quintana (COL)	Movistar Team	16h 26' 39"
2	Rigoberto Urán (COL)	EF Education First–Drapac p/b Cannondale	+ 3"
3	Sergio Henao (COL)	Team Sky	+ 4"
4	Egan Bernal (COL)	Team Sky	+ 9"
5	Iván Sosa (COL)	Androni Giocattoli–Sidermec	+ 30"
6	Daniel Martínez (COL)	EF Education First–Drapac p/b Cannondale	+ 38"
7	Julian Alaphilippe (FRA)	Quick-Step Floors	+ 39"
8	Jhonatan Narváez (ECU)	Quick-Step Floors	+ 42"
9	Aristóbulo Cala (COL)	Bicicletas Strongman–Colombia Coldeportes	+ 55"
10	Danny Osorio (COL)	Orgullo Paisa	+ 57"

=== Stage 6 ===
Stage 6 result

Rank	Rider	Team	Time
1	Dayer Quintana (COL)	Movistar Team	4h 22' 11"
2	Egan Bernal (COL)	Team Sky	+ 10"
3	Sebastián Henao (COL)	Team Sky	s.t.
4	Ángel Alexander Gil (COL)	EPM	+ 14"
5	Daniel Martínez (COL)	EF Education First–Drapac p/b Cannondale	+ 18"
6	Óscar Sevilla (ESP)	Medellín	s.t.
7	Rigoberto Urán (COL)	EF Education First–Drapac p/b Cannondale	+ 21"
8	Nairo Quintana (COL)	Movistar Team	s.t.
9	Sergio Henao (COL)	Team Sky	s.t.
10	Julian Alaphilippe (FRA)	Quick-Step Floors	+ 24"

== Final standings ==
Final general classification

Rank	Rider	Team	Time
1	Egan Bernal (COL)	Team Sky	20h 49' 03"
2	Nairo Quintana (COL)	Movistar Team	+ 8"
3	Rigoberto Urán (COL)	EF Education First–Drapac p/b Cannondale	+ 11"
4	Sergio Henao (COL)	Team Sky	+ 12"
5	Daniel Martínez (COL)	EF Education First–Drapac p/b Cannondale	+ 43"
6	Iván Sosa (COL)	Androni Giocattoli–Sidermec	+ 45"
7	Julian Alaphilippe (FRA)	Quick-Step Floors	+ 50"
8	Aristóbulo Cala (COL)	Bicicletas Strongman–Colombia Coldeportes	+ 1' 10"
9	Danny Osorio (COL)	Orgullo Paisa	+ 1' 12"
10	Jhonatan Narváez (ECU)	Quick-Step Floors	+ 1' 18"

Final points classification

Rank	Rider	Team	Points
1	Fernando Gaviria (COL)	Quick-Step Floors	59
2	Juan Sebastián Molano (COL)	Team Manzana Postobón	34
3	Matteo Malucelli (ITA)	Androni Giocattoli–Sidermec	32
4	Rigoberto Urán (COL)	EF Education First–Drapac p/b Cannondale	28
5	Egan Bernal (COL)	Team Sky	28
6	Nairo Quintana (COL)	Movistar Team	26
7	Sergio Henao (COL)	Team Sky	23
8	Davide Viganò (ITA)	Italy	20
9	Miguel Ángel Rubiano (COL)	Coldeportes–Zenú–Sello Rojo	18
10	Julian Alaphilippe (FRA)	Quick-Step Floors	17

Final mountains classification

Rank	Rider	Team	Points
1	Egan Bernal (COL)	Team Sky	11
2	Dayer Quintana (COL)	Movistar Team	10
3	Sebastián Henao (COL)	Team Sky	6
4	Nicolás Paredes (COL)	Medellín	5
5	Jordan Parra (COL)	Team Manzana Postobón	4
6	Ángel Alexander Gil (COL)	EPM	4
7	Julian Alaphilippe (FRA)	Quick-Step Floors	3
8	Jonathan Cañaveral (COL)	Bicicletas Strongman–Colombia Coldeportes	3
9	Daniel Martínez (COL)	EF Education First–Drapac p/b Cannondale	2
10	Rodrigo Contreras (COL)	EPM	2

Final young riders classification

Rank	Rider	Team	Time
1	Egan Bernal (COL)	Team Sky	20h 49' 03"
2	Daniel Martínez (COL)	EF Education First–Drapac p/b Cannondale	+ 43"
3	Iván Sosa (COL)	Androni Giocattoli–Sidermec	+ 45"
4	Jhonatan Narváez (ECU)	Quick-Step Floors	+ 1' 18"
5	Hugh Carthy (GBR)	EF Education First–Drapac p/b Cannondale	+ 1' 55"
6	Diego Ochoa (COL)	EPM	+ 1' 58"
7	Sebastián Henao (COL)	Team Sky	+ 2' 02"
8	Taylor Eisenhart (USA)	Holowesko Citadel p/b Arapahoe Resources	+ 2' 39"
9	Richard Carapaz (ECU)	Movistar Team	+ 2' 40"
10	Aldemar Reyes (COL)	Team Manzana Postobón	+ 3' 14"

Final team classification

Rank	Team	Time
1	Team Sky	62h 29' 43"
2	EF Education First–Drapac p/b Cannondale	+ 25"
3	EPM	+ 1' 35"
4	Movistar Team	+ 2' 38"
5	Orgullo Paisa	+ 4' 14"
6	Colombia	+ 5' 45"
7	Bicicletas Strongman–Colombia Coldeportes	+ 9' 21"
8	Medellín	+ 9' 24"
9	Team Manzana Postobón	+ 9' 38"
10	GW–Shimano	+ 12' 30"
