= 2017 Vuelta a Colombia =

2017 UCI America Tour
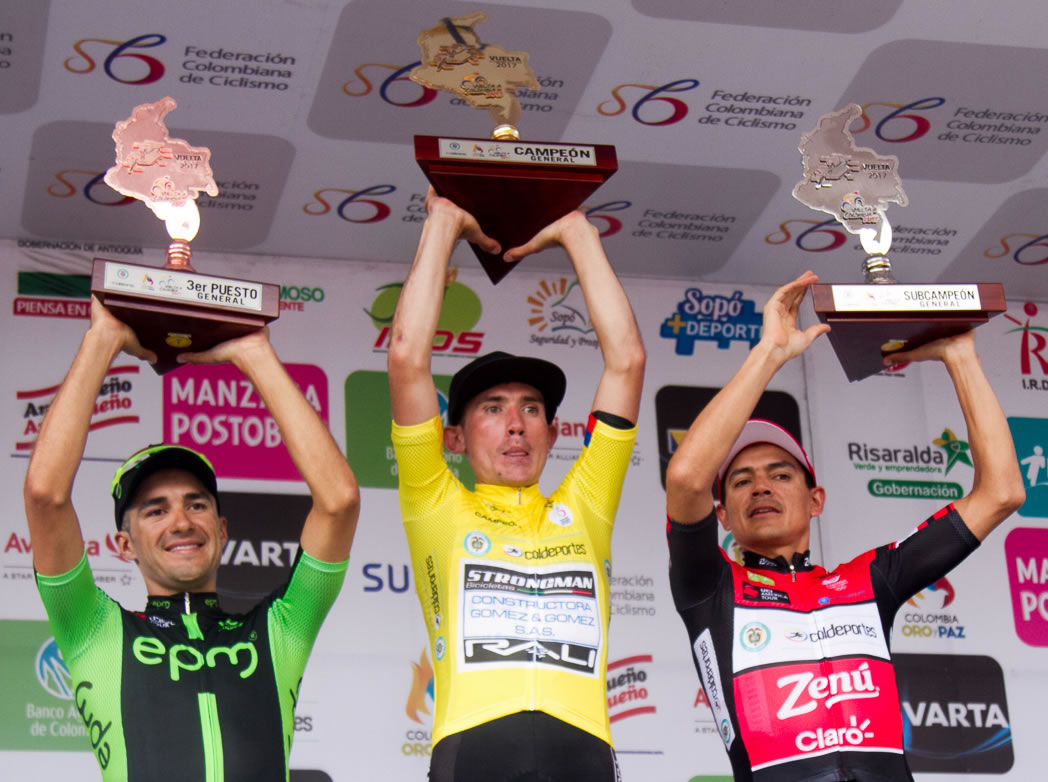

Race details
- Dates: August 1–13, 2017
- Stages: 12
- Winning time: 42h 07' 25"

Results
	Winner	Aristóbulo Cala (COL)
	Second	Alex Cano (COL)
	Third	Juan Pablo Suárez (COL)
	Points	Nelson Soto (COL)
	Mountains	Miguel Ángel Reyes (COL)
	Young rider	Anderson Paredes (VEN)
	Sprints	Weimar Roldán (COL)
	Team	Coldeportes Zenú

The 67th edition of the Vuelta a Colombia was held from 1 to 13 August 2017.

== Route ==
Stage characteristics and winners
Stage	Date	Course	Distance	Type	Stage winner
1	August 1	Rionegro to La Ceja	18.4 km (11.4 mi)	Team time trial	EPM
2	August 2	Rionegro to Puerto Boyacá	173.2 km (107.6 mi)	Hilly stage	Wilmar Paredes (COL)
3	August 3	Puerto Boyacá to Barrancabermeja	222.4 km (138.2 mi)	Flat stage	Nelson Soto (COL)
4	August 4	Barrancabermeja to Bucaramanga	165.3 km (102.7 mi)	Mountain stage	Juan Pablo Suárez (COL)
5	August 5	Bucaramanga to Barichara	118.3 km (73.5 mi)	Medium mountain stage	Alex Cano (COL)
6	August 6	Socorro to Sogamoso	237.7 km (147.7 mi)	Mountain stage	Griffin Easter (USA)
7	August 7	Tunja to Sopó	113.5 km (70.5 mi)	Medium mountain stage	José Serpa (COL)
	August 8	Rest day			
8	August 9	Mariquita	36.5 km (22.7 mi)	Individual time trial	Alex Cano (COL)
9	August 10	La Dorada to Páramo de Letras	131.6 km (81.8 mi)	Mountain stage	Miguel Ángel Reyes (COL)
10	August 11	Cartago to Yumbo	176 km (109 mi)	Flat stage	Nelson Soto (COL)
11	August 12	Palmira to Dosquebradas	190.8 km (118.6 mi)	Hilly stage	Nelson Soto (COL)
12	August 13	Pereira to Pereira	107 km (66 mi)	Flat stage	Juan Pablo Villegas (COL)

== Classifications ==
Final general classification

Rank	Rider	Team	Time
1	Aristóbulo Cala (COL)	Bicicletas Strongman	42h 07' 25"
2	Alex Cano (COL)	Coldeportes–Zenú	+ 2' 05"
3	Juan Pablo Suárez (COL)	EPM	+ 2' 07"
4	Jonathan Caicedo (ECU)	Bicicletas Strongman	+ 2' 19"
5	Miguel Ángel Reyes (COL)	Agencia Nacional de Seguridad Vial	+ 4' 06"
6	Miguel Ángel Rubiano (COL)	Coldeportes–Zenú	+ 4' 52"
7	Luis Felipe Laverde (COL)	Coldeportes–Zenú	+ 5' 47"
8	Óscar Soliz (BOL)	Movistar Team América	+ 6' 05"
9	Óscar Sevilla (ESP)	Medellín–Inder	+ 7' 05"
10	José Serpa (COL)	Team Super Giros	+ 8' 14"

Final mountains classification

Rank	Rider	Team	Points
1	Miguel Ángel Reyes (COL)	Agencia Nacional de Seguridad Vial	39
2	Juan Pablo Suárez (COL)	EPM	28
3	Miguel Ángel Rubiano (COL)	Coldeportes–Zenú	23

Final intermediate sprints classification

Rank	Rider	Team	Points
1	Weimar Roldán (COL)	Medellín–Inder	18
2	Diego Ochoa (COL)	EPM	18
3	Nicolás Paredes (COL)	Medellín–Inder	13

Final points classification

Rank	Rider	Team	Points
1	Nelson Soto (COL)	Coldeportes–Zenú	66
2	Miguel Ángel Rubiano (COL)	Coldeportes–Zenú	51
3	José Serpa (COL)	Team Super Giros	42

Final young rider classification

Rank	Rider	Team	Time
1	Anderson Paredes (VEN)	JB Ropa Deportiva	42h 29' 03"
2	Sergio Higuita (COL)	Team Manzana Postobón	+ 12' 47"
3	Wilson Cardona (COL)	GW–Shimano	+ 37' 28"

Final team classification

Rank	Team	Time
1	Coldeportes–Zenú	125h 46' 20"
2	Bicicletas Strongman	+ 6' 52"
3	Agencia Nacional de Seguridad Vial	+ 23' 28"
