= Hato =

Hato or HATO may refer to:

== Places ==
- Hato International Airport, Willemstad, Curaçao
- Hato, Curaçao, a village and former plantation in Curaçao
- Hato, Santander, a town in Santander Department, Colombia
- Hato, San Lorenzo, Puerto Rico, a barrio in San Lorenzo, Puerto Rico (U.S.)

== People with the surname ==
- Ana Hato (1907–1953), New Zealand singer
- Ergilio Hato (1926–2003), football goalkeeper from Curaçao, Netherlands Antilles
- Jorrel Hato (born 2006), Dutch football defender
- Yasuhiro Hato (born 1976), Japanese footballer

== Other uses ==
- Japanese torpedo boat Hato, two Japanese warships
- Typhoon Hato
- Highways Agency Traffic Officer, UK
