= 2019 Deceuninck–Quick-Step season =

Cycling team season

Deceuninck-Quick Step
- 2019 season
- UCI code: QST
- Status: UCI ProTeam
- Manager: Patrick Lefevere
- Main sponsor(s): Quick-Step
- Based: Belgium
- Bicycles: Specialized
- Groupset: Shimano

Season victories
- One-day races: 16
- Stage race overall: 2
- Stage race stages: 39
- National Championships: 6

The 2019 season for Deceuninck–Quick-Step began in January at the Tour Down Under. As a UCI WorldTeam, they were automatically invited and obliged to send a squad to every event in the UCI World Tour.

== 2019 roster ==
As of 6 August 2019.

| Rider | Date of birth |
|---|---|
| Julian Alaphilippe (FRA) | 11 June 1992 (aged 27) |
| Kasper Asgreen (DEN) | 8 February 1995 (aged 24) |
| Eros Capecchi (ITA) | 13 June 1986 (aged 33) |
| Rémi Cavagna (FRA) | 10 August 1995 (aged 23) |
| Tim Declercq (BEL) | 21 March 1989 (aged 30) |
| Dries Devenyns (BEL) | 22 July 1983 (aged 36) |
| Remco Evenepoel (BEL) | 25 January 2000 (aged 19) |
| Sam Gaze (Note: Gaze joined the team on 1 August, as a stagiaire, from Specialized Racing(MTB).) (NZL) | 12 December 1995 (aged 23) |
| Philippe Gilbert (BEL) | 5 July 1982 (aged 37) |
| Álvaro José Hodeg (COL) | 16 September 1996 (aged 22) |
| Mikkel Frølich Honoré (DEN) | 21 January 1997 (aged 22) |
| Fabio Jakobsen (NED) | 31 August 1996 (aged 22) |
| Bob Jungels (LUX) | 22 September 1992 (aged 26) |
| Iljo Keisse (BEL) | 21 December 1982 (aged 36) |

| Rider | Date of birth |
|---|---|
| James Knox (GBR) | 4 November 1995 (aged 23) |
| Yves Lampaert (BEL) | 10 April 1991 (aged 28) |
| Davide Martinelli (ITA) | 31 May 1993 (aged 26) |
| Enric Mas (ESP) | 7 January 1995 (aged 24) |
| Michael Mørkøv (DEN) | 30 April 1985 (aged 34) |
| Maximiliano Richeze (ARG) | 7 March 1983 (aged 36) |
| Fabio Sabatini (ITA) | 18 February 1985 (aged 34) |
| Florian Sénéchal (FRA) | 10 July 1993 (aged 26) |
| Pieter Serry (BEL) | 21 November 1988 (aged 30) |
| Jannik Steimle (Note: Steimle joined the team on 1 August, as a stagiaire, from Team Vorarlberg Santic.) (GER) | 4 April 1996 (aged 23) |
| Zdeněk Štybar (CZE) | 11 December 1985 (aged 33) |
| Petr Vakoč (CZE) | 11 July 1992 (aged 27) |
| Elia Viviani (ITA) | 7 February 1989 (aged 30) |

Riders who joined the team for the 2019 season

| Rider | 2018 team |
|---|---|
| Remco Evenepoel | |
| Mikkel Frølich Honoré | Team Waoo |

Riders who left the team during or after the 2018 season

| Rider | 2019 team |
|---|---|
| Laurens De Plus | Team Jumbo–Visma |
| Fernando Gaviria | UAE Team Emirates |
| Jhonatan Narváez | Team Sky |
| Maximilian Schachmann | Bora–Hansgrohe |
| Niki Terpstra | Direct Énergie |

== Season victories ==
| Date | Race | Competition | Rider | Country | Location |
|---|---|---|---|---|---|
| 15 January | Tour Down Under, Stage 1 | UCI World Tour | Elia Viviani (ITA) | Australia | Adelaide |
| 27 January | Cadel Evans Great Ocean Road Race | UCI World Tour | Elia Viviani (ITA) | Australia | Geelong |
| 28 January | Vuelta a San Juan, Stage 2 | UCI America Tour | Julian Alaphilippe (FRA) | Argentina | Lago Punta Negra |
| 29 January | Vuelta a San Juan, Stage 3 | UCI America Tour | Julian Alaphilippe (FRA) | Argentina | Pocito |
| 3 February | Vuelta a San Juan, Young rider classification | UCI America Tour | Remco Evenepoel (BEL) | Argentina | |
| 13 February | Tour Colombia, Stage 2 | UCI America Tour | Álvaro Hodeg (COL) | Colombia | La Ceja |
| 15 February | Tour Colombia, Stage 4 | UCI America Tour | Bob Jungels (LUX) | Colombia | Medellín |
| 16 February | Tour Colombia, Stage 5 | UCI America Tour | Julian Alaphilippe (FRA) | Colombia | La Unión |
| 16 February | Tour de la Provence, Stage 3 | UCI Europe Tour | Philippe Gilbert (BEL) | France | Circuit Paul Ricard |
| 17 February | Tour Colombia, Points classification | UCI America Tour | Julian Alaphilippe (FRA) | Colombia | |
| 20 February | Volta ao Algarve, Stage 1 | UCI Europe Tour | Fabio Jakobsen (NED) | Portugal | Lagos |
| 24 February | Volta ao Algarve, Stage 5 | UCI Europe Tour | Zdeněk Štybar (CZE) | Portugal | Alto do Malhão |
| 24 February | Volta ao Algarve, Mountains classification | UCI Europe Tour | Tim Declercq (BEL) | Portugal | |
| 28 February | UAE Tour, Stage 5 | UCI World Tour | Elia Viviani (ITA) | United Arab Emirates | Khor Fakkan |
| 2 March | UAE Tour, Points classification | UCI World Tour | Elia Viviani (ITA) | United Arab Emirates | |
| 2 March | Omloop Het Nieuwsblad | UCI World Tour | Zdeněk Štybar (CZE) | Belgium | Ninove |
| 3 March | Kuurne–Brussels–Kuurne | UCI Europe Tour | Bob Jungels (LUX) | Belgium | Kuurne |
| 5 March | Le Samyn | UCI Europe Tour | Florian Sénéchal (FRA) | Belgium | Dour |
| 9 March | Strade Bianche | UCI World Tour | Julian Alaphilippe (FRA) | Italy | Siena |
| 14 March | Tirreno–Adriatico, Stage 2 | UCI World Tour | Julian Alaphilippe (FRA) | Italy | Pomarance |
| 15 March | Tirreno–Adriatico, Stage 3 | UCI World Tour | Elia Viviani (ITA) | Italy | Foligno |
| 18 March | Tirreno–Adriatico, Stage 6 | UCI World Tour | Julian Alaphilippe (FRA) | Italy | Jesi |
| 23 March | Milan–San Remo | UCI World Tour | Julian Alaphilippe (FRA) | Italy | Sanremo |
| 29 March | E3 BinckBank Classic | UCI World Tour | Zdeněk Štybar (CZE) | Belgium | Harelbeke |
| 9 April | Tour of the Basque Country, Stage 2 | UCI World Tour | Julian Alaphilippe (FRA) | Spain | Gorraiz |
| 10 April | Scheldeprijs | UCI Europe Tour | Fabio Jakobsen (NED) | Belgium | Schoten |
| 14 April | Paris–Roubaix | UCI World Tour | Philippe Gilbert (BEL) | France | Roubaix |
| 18 April | Tour of Turkey, Stage 3 | UCI World Tour | Fabio Jakobsen (NED) | Turkey | Edremit |
| 24 April | La Flèche Wallonne | UCI World Tour | Julian Alaphilippe (FRA) | Belgium | Huy |
| 13 May | Tour of California, Stage 2 | UCI World Tour | Kasper Asgreen (DEN) | United States | South Lake Tahoe |
| 14 May | Tour of California, Stage 3 | UCI World Tour | Rémi Cavagna (FRA) | United States | Morgan Hill |
| 15 May | Tour of California, Stage 4 | UCI World Tour | Fabio Jakobsen (NED) | United States | Morro Bay |
| 18 May | Tour of California, Points classification | UCI World Tour | Kasper Asgreen (DEN) | United States | |
| 29 May | Tour of Norway, Stage 2 | UCI Europe Tour | Álvaro Hodeg (COL) | Norway | Mandal |
| 7 June | Hammer Limburg, Stage 1 (climb) | UCI Europe Tour | Team (Note: The winning riders were Dries Devenyns, Remco Evenepoel, Fabio Jakobsen, Yves Lampaert, Davide Martinelli and Michael Mørkøv) | Netherlands | Limburg |
| 8 June | Hammer Limburg, Stage 2 (sprint) | UCI Europe Tour | Team (Note: The winning riders were Dries Devenyns, Remco Evenepoel, Fabio Jakobsen, Yves Lampaert, Davide Martinelli and Michael Mørkøv) | Netherlands | Limburg |
| 9 June | Hammer Limburg, Overall | UCI Europe Tour | Team (Note: The winning riders were Dries Devenyns, Remco Evenepoel, Fabio Jakobsen, Yves Lampaert, Davide Martinelli and Michael Mørkøv) | Netherlands | Limburg |
| 13 June | Tour of Belgium, Stage 2 | UCI Europe Tour | Remco Evenepoel (BEL) | Belgium | Zottegem |
| 14 June | Critérium du Dauphiné, Stage 6 | UCI World Tour | Julian Alaphilippe (FRA) | France | Saint-Michel-de-Maurienne |
| 16 June | Critérium du Dauphiné, Mountains classification | UCI World Tour | Julian Alaphilippe (FRA) | France | |
| 16 June | Tour of Belgium, General classification | UCI Europe Tour | Remco Evenepoel (BEL) | Belgium | |
| 16 June | Tour of Belgium, Points classification | UCI Europe Tour | Remco Evenepoel (BEL) | Belgium | |
| 18 June | Tour de Suisse, Stage 4 | UCI World Tour | Elia Viviani (ITA) | Switzerland | Arlesheim |
| 19 June | Tour de Suisse, Stage 5 | UCI World Tour | Elia Viviani (ITA) | Switzerland | Einsiedeln |
| 22 June | Tour de Suisse, Stage 8 (ITT) | UCI World Tour | Yves Lampaert (BEL) | Switzerland | Goms |
| 22 June | Heistse Pijl | UCI Europe Tour | Álvaro Hodeg (COL) | Belgium | Heist-op-den-Berg |
| 8 July | Tour de France, Stage 3 | UCI World Tour | Julian Alaphilippe (FRA) | France | Épernay |
| 9 July | Tour de France, Stage 4 | UCI World Tour | Elia Viviani (ITA) | France | Nancy |
| 19 July | Tour de France, Stage 13 (ITT) | UCI World Tour | Julian Alaphilippe (FRA) | France | Pau |
| 25 July | Adriatica Ionica Race, Stage 2 | UCI Europe Tour | Álvaro Hodeg (COL) | Italy | Grado |
| 27 July | Adriatica Ionica Race, Stage 4 | UCI Europe Tour | Remco Evenepoel (BEL) | Italy | Cormons |
| 28 July | Adriatica Ionica Race, Stage 5 | UCI Europe Tour | Álvaro Hodeg (COL) | Italy | Trieste |
| 28 July | Adriatica Ionica Race, Points classification | UCI Europe Tour | Álvaro Hodeg (COL) | Italy | |
| 28 July | Adriatica Ionica Race, Team classification | UCI Europe Tour | Team (Note: The winning riders were Remco Evenepoel, Philippe Gilbert, Álvaro Hodeg, Mikkel Frølich Honoré, James Knox, Davide Martinelli, and Florian Sénéchal) | Italy | |
| 28 July | Tour de France, Super-combativity award | UCI World Tour | Julian Alaphilippe (FRA) | France | |
| 3 August | Clásica de San Sebastián | UCI World Tour | Remco Evenepoel (BEL) | Spain | San Sebastián |
| 4 August | London–Surrey Classic | UCI World Tour | Elia Viviani (ITA) | United Kingdom | London |
| 16 August | BinckBank Tour, Stage 5 | UCI World Tour | Álvaro Hodeg (COL) | Netherlands | Venray |
| 25 August | EuroEyes Cyclassics | UCI World Tour | Elia Viviani (ITA) | Germany | Hamburg |
| 27 August | Vuelta a España, Stage 4 | UCI World Tour | Fabio Jakobsen (NED) | Spain | El Puig |
| 31 August | Deutschland Tour, Stage 3 | UCI Europe Tour | Kasper Asgreen (DEN) | Germany | Eisenach |
| 5 September | Vuelta a España, Stage 12 | UCI World Tour | Philippe Gilbert (BEL) | Spain | Bilbao |
| 11 September | Vuelta a España, Stage 17 | UCI World Tour | Philippe Gilbert (BEL) | Spain | Guadalajara |
| 12 September | Vuelta a España, Stage 18 | UCI World Tour | Rémi Cavagna (FRA) | Spain | Toledo |
| 15 September | Vuelta a España, Stage 21 | UCI World Tour | Fabio Jakobsen (NED) | Spain | Madrid |
| 20 September | Kampioenschap van Vlaanderen | UCI Europe Tour | Jannik Steimle (GER) | Belgium | Ardooie |
| 21 September | Tour of Slovakia, stage 4 | UCI Europe Tour | Elia Viviani (ITA) | Slovakia | Senica |
| 21 September | Tour of Slovakia, General classification | UCI Europe Tour | Yves Lampaert (BEL) | Slovakia | |
| 3 October | Münsterland Giro | UCI Europe Tour | Álvaro Hodeg (COL) | Germany | Münster |
| 20 October | Tour of Guangxi, Stage 4 | UCI World Tour | Enric Mas (ESP) | China | Mashan County |
| 22 October | Tour of Guangxi, General classification | UCI World Tour | Enric Mas (ESP) | China | |
| 22 October | Tour of Guangxi, Young rider classification | UCI World Tour | Enric Mas (ESP) | China | |

== National, Continental and World champions ==
| Date | Discipline | Jersey | Rider | Country | Location |
|---|---|---|---|---|---|
| 28 April | Argentine National Road Race Champion | | Maximiliano Richeze (ARG) | Argentina | Santiago del Estero |
| 27 June | Danish National Time Trial Champion | | Kasper Asgreen (DEN) | Denmark | Esbjerg |
| 28 June | Luxembourgish National Time Trial Champion | | Bob Jungels (LUX) | Luxembourg | Differdange |
| 30 June | Luxembourgish National Road Race Champion | | Bob Jungels (LUX) | Luxembourg | Sanem |
| 30 June | Danish National Road Race Champion | | Michael Mørkøv (DEN) | Denmark | Esbjerg |
| 30 June | Dutch National Road Race Champion | | Fabio Jakobsen (NED) | Netherlands | Ede |
| 8 August | European Time Trial Champion | | Remco Evenepoel (BEL) | Netherlands | Alkmaar |
| 11 August | European Road Race Champion | | Elia Viviani (ITA) | Netherlands | Alkmaar |
