= Javier Gómez (cyclist) =

Colombian cyclist

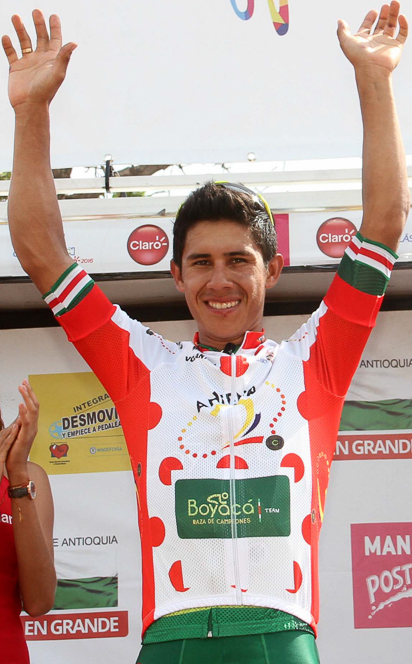
- Gómez in 2016

Personal information
- Full name: Javier Eduardo Gómez Pineda
- Born: 16 October 1991 (age 35) Sogamoso, Colombia

Cycling career
- Sport: Cycling
- Discipline: Road
- Role: Rider

Amateur teams
- 2015: Raza de Campeones Loteria da Boyacá
- 2017: Boyaca es Para Vivirla

Professional teams
- 2011–2012: EPM–UNE
- 2013: Colombia–Coldeportes
- 2016: Boyacá Raza de Campeones

Javier Eduardo Gómez Pineda (born 16 October 1991 in Sogamoso) is a Colombian former professional cyclist.

== Major results ==
2011
1st Stage 1 Clásico RCN
2012
1st Stage 6 Vuelta a Guatemala
2013
1st Stage 8 Vuelta a Bolivia
