= Supergiros–Alcaldía de Manizales =

Colombian cycling team

Team information
- UCI code: ECS
- Registered: Colombia
- Founded: 2010
- Discipline: Road
- Status: Amateur (2010–2019, 2021–); UCI Continental (2020)

Key personnel
- General manager: Jhon Jairo Montoya Gomez
- Team manager: Luis Fernando Otalvaro Montoya

Team name history
- 2010 2011 2012 2013–2014 2015–2016 2017–2018 2019 2020 2021–: Supergiros; Indervalle–Redetrans–Supergiros; Supergiros–Redetrans; Supergiros–Blanco del Valle–Redetrans; Supergiros–Redetrans; Supergiros; Supergiros–Alcaldía de Manizales; Equipo Continental Supergiros; Supergiros–Alcaldía de Manizales

Supergiros–Alcaldía de Manizales is a Colombian cycling team founded in 2010. In 2020, the team upgraded from amateur status to UCI Continental but returned to club status the following year.

== Team roster ==
As of 6 October 2020.

Rider	Date of birth
Rubén Darío Acosta (COL)	20 August 1996 (age 30)
Juan José Amador (COL)	20 April 1998 (age 28)
Duván Atapuma (COL)	1 April 1997 (age 29)
Juan Manuel Barboza (COL)	27 September 2000 (age 25)
Edwin Carvajal (COL)	6 March 1983 (age 43)
Yuber Contreras (COL)	3 July 1994 (age 32)
Bryan Gómez (COL)	19 November 1994 (age 31)

Rider	Date of birth
Javier Steven González (COL)	13 December 1995 (age 30)
Leison Damián Maca (COL)	29 June 1998 (age 28)
Walter Pedraza (COL)	27 November 1981 (age 44)
Yeison Rincón (COL)	18 August 1997 (age 29)
Óscar Eduardo Sánchez (COL)	14 May 1985 (age 41)
Bernardo Suaza (COL)	28 November 1992 (age 33)
Jordan Tabares (COL)	23 July 1996 (age 30)

== Major wins ==
2016
Overall Vuelta a Colombia, Mauricio Ortega

Stages 6 (ITT) & 7, Mauricio Ortega

2017
Stage 7 Vuelta a Colombia, José Serpa
2020
Stage 1 Vuelta a Colombia, Bernardo Suaza
