= Aristóbulo Cala =

Colombian cyclist

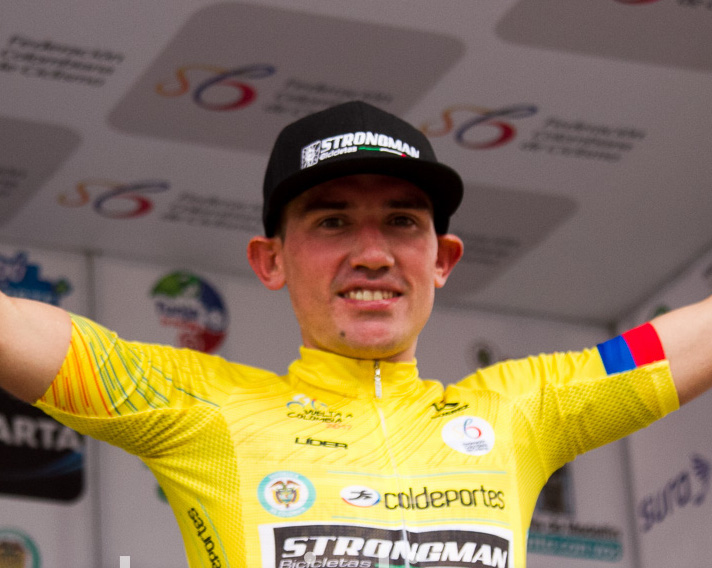

Personal information
- Full name: Aristóbulo Cala Cala
- Born: 13 May 1990 (age 36) Hato, Santander, Colombia

Cycling career
- Sport: Cycling
- Current team: Coldeportes Bicicletas Strongman
- Discipline: Road
- Role: Rider

Amateur teams
- 2013–2014: Formesan–Bogotá Humana
- 2016: Sogamoso Ciudad–Influyente

Professional team
- 2017–: Bicicletas Strongman

Major wins
- One-day races and Classics National Road Race Championships (2021)

Aristóbulo Cala Cala (born 13 May 1990 in Hato, Santander) is a Colombian cyclist riding for Coldeportes Bicicletas Strongman.

== Career ==
Cala rode the first bicycle when he was 14 years old. It was borrowed from his cousin because he did not have its own bike. Aristobulo come from a farmer family with limited resources but his love by the bike took him to save for his first bike and started to be present at local stages when he was 18 years old. He always was in the podium even when he did not know the riding techniques, his outstanding results and performance specially in the high hills called the attention from more experienced riders and sponsors saying he was born for cycling, he has the cycling in his genes. Therefore, he was taken to Boyacá at 20 years old, to be trained at 2,600 m above sea level and participated in his first national games where he was 3rd in sub-23 category. From there he is always a great protagonist in each presentation, specially in those stages with high mountains where is very hard for others, he is feeling like at home, a pure climber. His major achievement is the overall winner in La Vuelta Colombia 2017 and recently 8th in Colombia Oro y Paz competition where he was at level of world-tour figures. Aristobulo demonstrated that his body respond favorable with more days in the competitions making him ideal for 2 or 3 weeks competitions.

== Major results ==
2010
3rd Road race, National Under-23 Road Championships
2017
1st Overall Vuelta a Colombia
2018
8th Overall Colombia Oro y Paz
10th Overall Vuelta a Costa Rica

1st Stage 10

2019
4th Road race, National Road Championships
2021
1st Road race, National Road Championships
3rd Overall Vuelta a Colombia
