= Juan Chamorro =

Juan Chamorro may refer to:

- Joan Chamorro (born 1962), Spanish musician
- Juan Ernesto Chamorro (born 1991), Colombian cyclist
- Juan Onofre Chamorro (1885–1941), Chilean trade unionist
- Juan Sebastián Chamorro (born 1971), Nicaraguan economist
