= Juan José Amador =

Colombian cyclist

Personal information
- Full name: Juan José Amador Castaño
- Born: 20 April 1998 (age 28) Manizales, Colombia
- Height: 1.79 m (5 ft 10 in)
- Weight: 63 kg (139 lb)

Cycling career
- Sport: Cycling
- Current team: Supergiros–Alcaldía de Manizales
- Discipline: Road
- Role: Rider

Professional teams
- 2017–2019: Team Manzana Postobón
- 2020–: Equipo Continental Supergiros

Juan José Amador Castaño (born 20 April 1998) is a Colombian cyclist who currently rides for UCI Continental team Supergiros–Alcaldía de Manizales.

In May 2019, Amador returned an adverse analytical finding (AAF) for boldenone – a naturally occurring anabolic–androgenic steroid (AAS) – in an out-of-competition control taken in October 2018. Team Manzana Postobón folded four days later, due to the doping cases of Amador and teammate Wilmar Paredes. Amador was ultimately cleared of the charge, and returned to racing in October 2020.

== Major results ==
2016
1st Time trial, National Junior Road Championships
1st Team pursuit, Pan American Junior Track Championships
Pan American Junior Road Championships

4th Time trial
9th Road race
