= Carlos Becerra (cyclist) =

Colombian cyclist

Personal information
- Full name: Carlos Andrés Becerra Alarcón
- Born: 5 August 1982 (age 44) Bogotá, Colombia

Cycling career
- Sport: Cycling
- Discipline: Road
- Role: Rider

Amateur teams
- 2013: Kino Táchira–Drodínica
- 2014–2015: Formesan-Bogotá Humana-Construval
- 2018: EBSA–Indeportes Boyacá

Professional team
- 2016–2017: Strongman–Campagnolo–Wilier

Carlos Andrés Becerra Alarcón (born 5 August 1982 in Bogotá) is a Colombian road cyclist.

== Major results ==
2007
2nd Overall Clásico Ciclístico Banfoandes
2009
1st Stage 9 Vuelta al Táchira
2011
2nd Overall Vuelta al Táchira
2015
2nd Overall Clásico RCN
2016
1st Stage 10 Vuelta Ciclista a Costa Rica
