= Miguel Ángel Reyes =

Colombian road cyclist

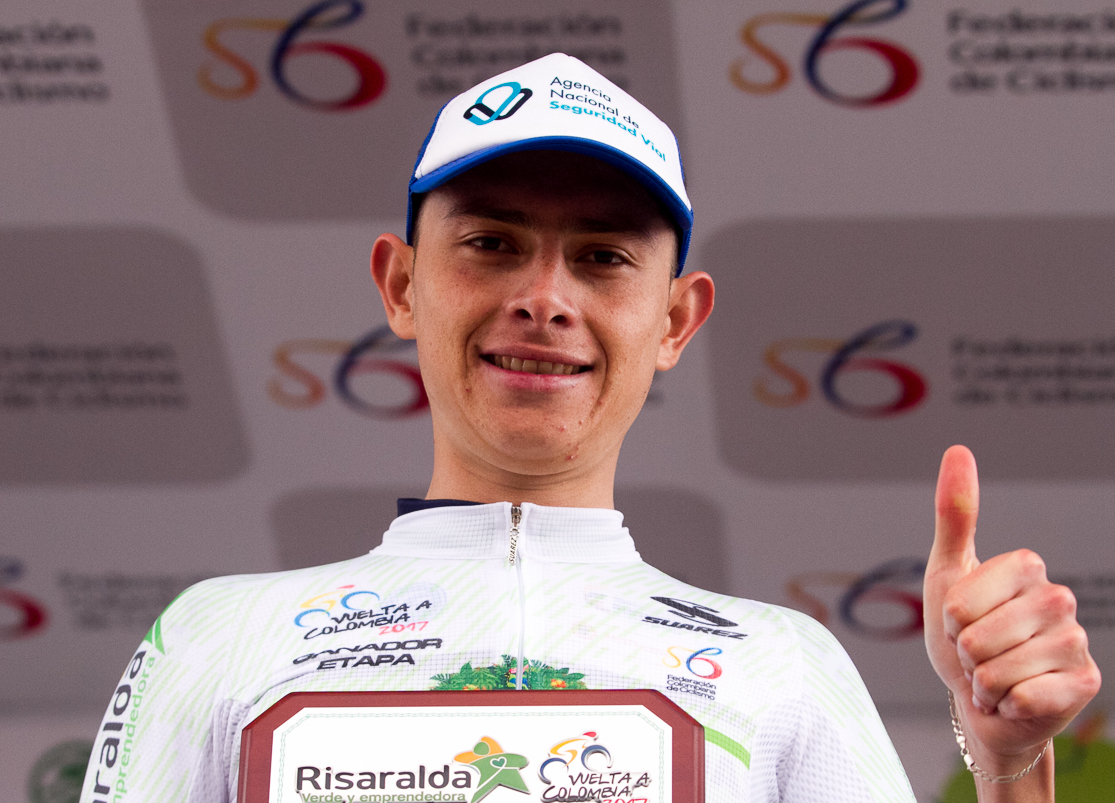
- Reyes in 2017

Personal information
- Full name: Miguel Ángel Reyes Vergara
- Born: 26 May 1992 (age 34) Bogotá, Colombia

Cycling career
- Sport: Cycling
- Current team: Nu Colombia
- Discipline: Road
- Role: Rider
- Rider type: Climber

Amateur teams
- 2013–2015: Aguardiente Néctar
- 2016: Pinturas Bler–Wilches
- 2017: Agencia Nacional de Seguridad Vial
- 2018: Deprisa–HYF–4WD Rentacar
- 2018: Nippo–Vini Fantini–Europa Ovini (stagiaire)

Professional teams
- 2015: RTS–Santic Racing Team
- 2019–: EPM

Miguel Ángel Reyes Vergara (born 26 May 1992) is a Colombian cyclist, who currently rides for UCI Continental team Nu Colombia.

== Major results ==
2017
5th Overall Vuelta a Colombia

1st Mountains classification
1st Stage 9

2018
2nd Overall Vuelta a Cundinamarca
2019
1st Overall Vuelta a Antioquia

1st Stages 3 & 4

1st Overall Vuelta al Valle del Cauca
1st Stage 3 (ITT) Clásica de Anapoima
2nd Overall Clásica de Fusagasugá

1st Stage 1 (ITT)
