= Didier Merchán =

Colombian cyclist

Personal information
- Full name: Didier Norberto Merchán Cardona
- Born: 26 July 1999 (age 27) Líbano, Tolima, Colombia
- Height: 1.67 m (5 ft 6 in)
- Weight: 57 kg (126 lb)

Cycling career
- Sport: Cycling
- Discipline: Road
- Role: Rider

Amateur team
- 2021: Colombia Tierra de Atletas–GW Bicicletas

Professional teams
- 2020: Colombia Tierra de Atletas–GW Bicicletas
- 2022–2023: Drone Hopper–Androni Giocattoli

Didier Norberto Merchán Cardona (born 26 July 1999) is a Colombian cyclist, who last rode for UCI Continental team GW Shimano–Sidermec.

== Major results ==
2019
1st Stage 10 Clásico RCN
2020
2nd Overall Vuelta al Tolima

1st Stage 3

3rd Overall Clásico RCN
2021
1st Overall Vuelta a Antioquia
1st Giro del Medio Brenta
2022
3rd Overall Vuelta al Táchira

1st Stage 8

2023
4th Road race, National Road Championships
