= Wilson Enrique Rodríguez =

Colombian cyclist

Personal information
- Full name: Wilson Enrique Rodríguez Amézquita
- Born: 22 February 1994 (age 32) Colombia

Cycling career
- Sport: Cycling
- Current team: EBSA–Indeportes Boyacá
- Discipline: Road
- Role: Rider

Amateur teams
- 2019: EC Ducossais
- 2020–: EBSA–Indeportes Boyacá

Professional team
- 2015–2017: Raza de Campeones Loteria da Boyacá

Wilson Enrique Rodríguez Amézquita (born 22 February 1994) is a Colombian cyclist who currently rides for EBSA–Indeportes Boyacá.

== Major results ==
2016
1st Overall Volta a Portugal do Futuro
