= Boyacá Raza de Campeones =

Colombian men's cycling team

Team information
- UCI code: BRC
- Registered: Colombia
- Founded: 2007
- Discipline: Road
- Status: UCI Continental (2015–2016)

Team name history
- 2007 2008 2009 2010 2011 2012–2013 2014 2015 2016 2017–2019 2020–: Boyacá Es Para Vivirla–Marche; Boyacá es Para Vivirla–Lecheboy; Boyacá es Para Vivirla; Boyacá es Para Vivirla–Orgullo de América; Boyacá Orgullo de América-Lotería de Boyacá; Boyacá Orgullo de América; Boyacá Se Atreve–Liciboy; Raza de Campeones–Lotería de Boyacá; Boyacá Raza de Campeones; Boyacá es Para Vivirla; Indeportes Boyacá Avanza–BRC

Boyacá Raza de Campeones is a professional men's cycling team based in Colombia. The team was founded in 2007 and held UCI Continental status in 2015 and 2016.

The disbanded at the end of the 2016 season.

== Team roster ==
As of 26 December 2015.

Rider	Date of birth
Ivan Darío Bothia (COL)	27 June 1990 (age 36)
Yeison Andrés Chaparro (COL)	26 July 1991 (age 35)
Juan Carlos Cruz (COL)	17 July 1994 (age 32)
Cristian Camilo Cubides (COL)	11 November 1996 (age 29)
Roller Diagama (COL)	13 September 1994 (age 31)
Miguel Eduardo Flórez (COL)	21 February 1996 (age 30)
Nestor García (COL)	11 November 1993 (age 32)
Javier Gómez (COL)	16 October 1991 (age 34)

Rider	Date of birth
Diego Mancipe (COL)	21 July 1993 (age 33)
Diego Ochoa (COL)	5 June 1993 (age 33)
Robinson Ortega (COL)	20 June 1996 (age 30)
Heiner Parra (COL)	9 October 1991 (age 34)
Carlos Parra (COL)	22 July 1992 (age 34)
Michael Rodríguez (COL)	29 July 1989 (age 37)
Wilson Rodríguez (COL)	22 February 1994 (age 32)
Jeffry Romero (COL)	4 October 1984 (age 41)

== Major wins ==
2016
Colombia U23 Road Race Championships, Roller Diagama
Stage 6 Vuelta a la Independencia Nacional, Diego Ochoa
Volta a Portugal do Futuro, Wilson Rodríguez

stage 3, Miguel Eduardo Flórez
stage 4, Roller Diagama

== National Champions ==
2016
Colombian U23 Road Race Championship, Roller Diagama
