= Colombia Potencia de la Vida–Strongman =

Colombian cycling team

Team information
- UCI code: CTA
- Registered: Colombia
- Founded: 2020
- Discipline: Road
- Status: UCI Continental

Key personnel
- General manager: Miguel Acevedo
- Team manager: Luis Alfonso Cely

Team name history
- 2020–2022 2023 2024–: Colombia Tierra de Atletas–GW Bicicletas; Colombia Pacto por el Deporte; Colombia Potencia de la Vida–Strongman

Colombia Potencia de la Vida–Strongman is a Colombian UCI Continental road cycling team founded in 2020.

== Team roster ==
As of 8 February 2024.

Rider	Date of birth
Freddy Avila (COL)	13 June 2003 (age 23)
Yeferson Camargo (COL)	10 November 2004 (age 21)
Yeisson Casallas (COL)	7 February 2000 (age 26)
Juan Camilo Castillo (COL)	15 September 2003 (age 22)
Marlon Diágama (COL)	17 April 2003 (age 23)

Rider	Date of birth
Jhojan García (COL)	10 January 1998 (age 28)
Nicolás David Gómez (COL)	27 May 2000 (age 26)
Cesar Guavita (COL)	13 January 2002 (age 24)
Ivan Ojeda (COL)	22 March 2002 (age 24)
Brayan Vargas (COL)	7 July 2003 (age 23)

== Major wins ==
2021
Stage 1 Vuelta a Colombia, Nelson Soto
Stage 8 Vuelta a Colombia, Darwin Atapuma
Stage 9 Vuelta a Colombia, Óscar Quiroz
Giro del Medio Brenta, Didier Merchán
Road race, Pan American Road Championships, Nelson Soto
