= Bernardo Suaza =

Colombian cyclist

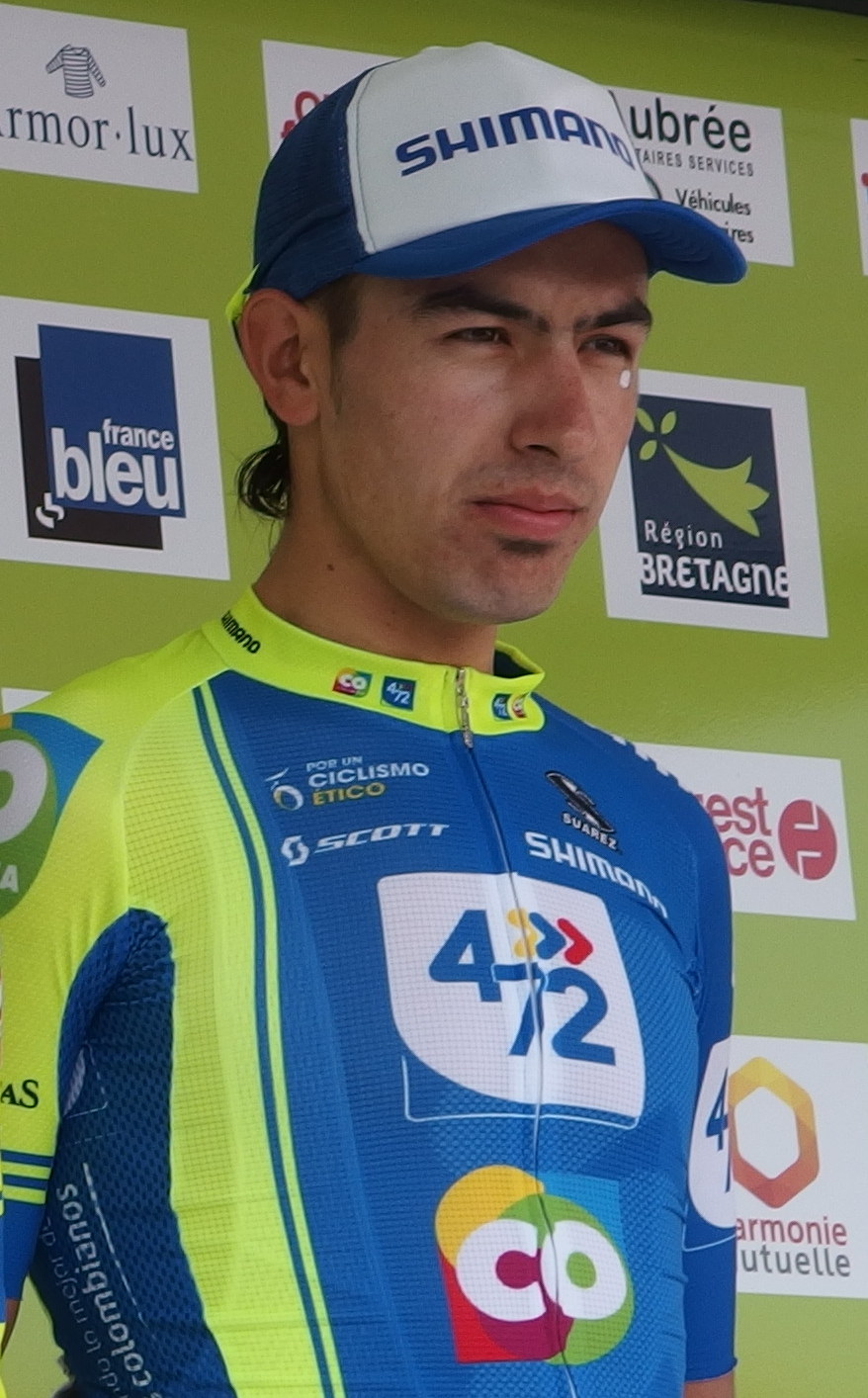
- Suaza in 2014.

Personal information
- Full name: Bernardo Albeiro Suaza Arango
- Born: 28 November 1992 (age 33) Retiro, Antioquia, Colombia
- Height: 1.74 m (5 ft 9 in)
- Weight: 66 kg (146 lb)

Cycling career
- Sport: Cycling
- Current team: Petrolike
- Discipline: Road
- Role: Rider

Amateur teams
- 2013: GW Chaoyang–Envía–Gatorade
- 2015: Team Manzana Postobón
- 2019: Supergiros–Alcaldía de Manizales

Professional teams
- 2014: 4-72 Colombia
- 2016–2019: Team Manzana Postobón
- 2020: Equipo Continental Supergiros
- 2021: Team Medellín
- 2023–: Team Petrolike

Bernardo Albeiro Suaza Arango (born 28 November 1992 in Retiro, Antioquia) is a Colombian cyclist, who currently rides for UCI Continental team Petrolike. He was named in the startlist for the 2017 Vuelta a España.

== Major results ==
2014
1st Overall Giro della Valle d'Aosta
5th Overall Ronde de l'Isard
2018
8th Overall Tour of Xingtai

1st Mountains classification

9th Overall Tour of China II
10th Klasika Primavera
2020
1st Stage 1 Vuelta a Colombia
2022
7th Time trial, National Road Championships

=== Grand Tour general classification results timeline ===
Grand Tour	2017
Giro d'Italia	—
Tour de France	—
Vuelta a España	49

Legend
—	Did not compete
DNF	Did not finish
