= Luis Felipe Laverde =

Colombian cyclist (born 1979)

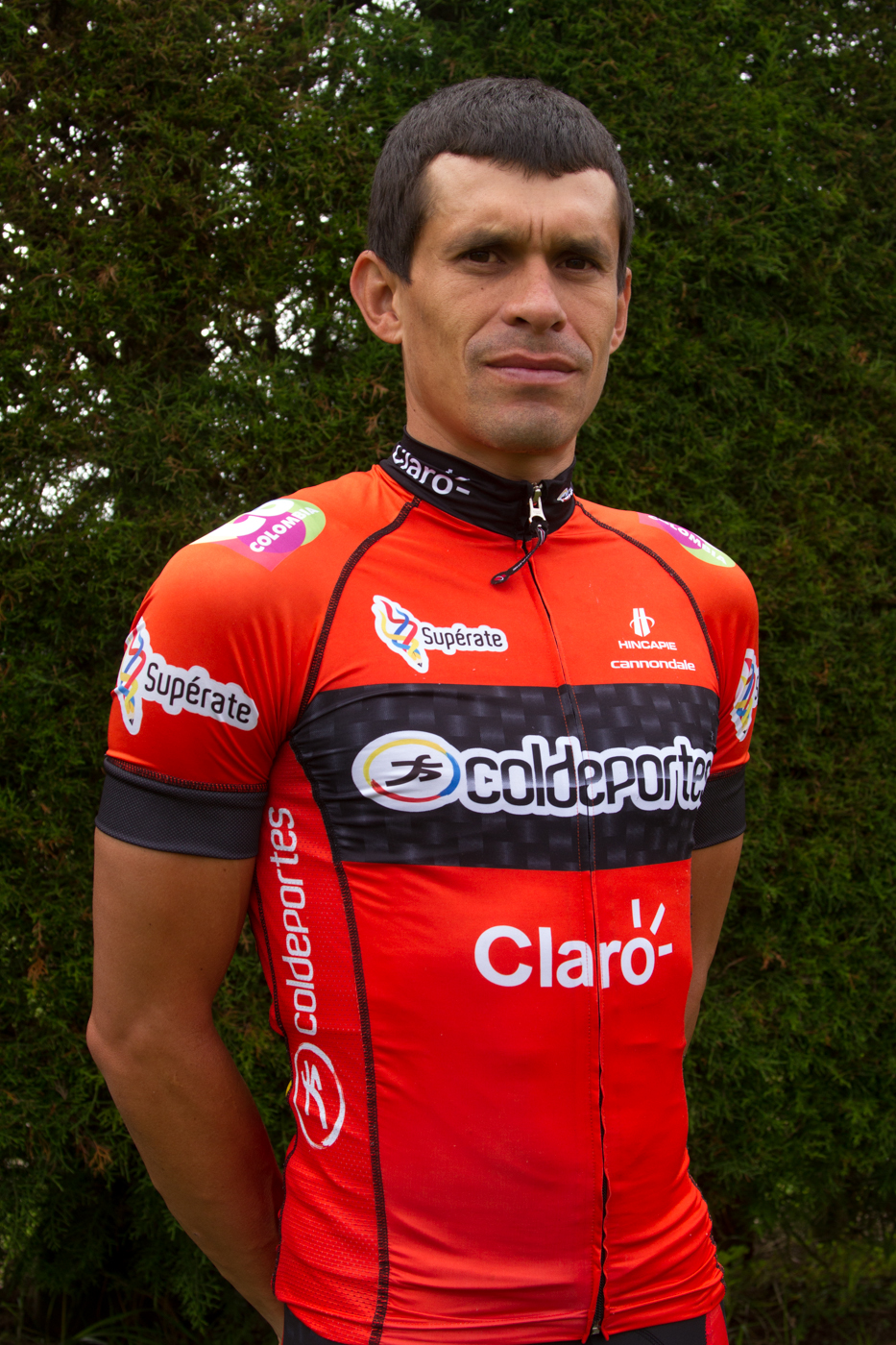
- Laverde in 2013

Personal information
- Full name: Luis Felipe Laverde Jimenez
- Born: July 6, 1979 (age 47) Urrao, Colombia
- Height: 1.69 m (5 ft 7 in)
- Weight: 63 kg (139 lb)

Cycling career
- Sport: Cycling
- Current team: Coldeportes–Zenú
- Discipline: Road
- Role: Rider
- Rider type: Climbing specialist

Amateur team
- 2001: Polisportiva Autolelli

Professional teams
- 2002: Mobilvetta Design
- 2003–2004: Formaggi Pinzolo Fiavè
- 2005–2008: Ceramica Panaria–Navigare
- 2009–2011: Colombia es Pasión–Coldeportes
- 2012: Colombia–Coldeportes
- 2013–: Colombia–Coldeportes

Major wins
- Giro d'Italia, 2 stages
Medal record
Representing Colombia
Men's track cycling
Central American and Caribbean Games
Bronze medal – third place	1998 Maracaibo	4000m Team Pursuit
Men's road bicycle racing
Pan American Championships
Bronze medal – third place	2011 Medellín	Road race

Luis Felipe Laverde Jimenez (Note: In this Spanish name, the first or paternal surname is Laverde and the second or maternal family name is Jimenez.) (born 6 July 1979 in Urrao) is a Colombian professional road bicycle racer for Coldeportes–Zenú, having left the Colombia–Coldeportes team. His best results are two stage victories in the Giro d'Italia, in 2006 and 2007.

== Palmarès ==
2001
Pan American Champion U23
2003
Stage 4, Settimana Ciclistica Lombarda
2006
Stage 14, Giro d'Italia
2007
Stage 6, Giro d'Italia
Gran Premio Nobili Rubinetterie
2011
3rd, Giro dell'Appennino
2013
6th Overall, Vuelta a Colombia
2014
4th, Pan American Road Race Championships
2015
3rd Overall, Vuelta a Colombia

1st Stage 12

2016
6th Overall, Vuelta a Colombia
2017
7th Overall, Vuelta a Colombia
