= Bryan Gómez =

Colombian cyclist (born 1994)

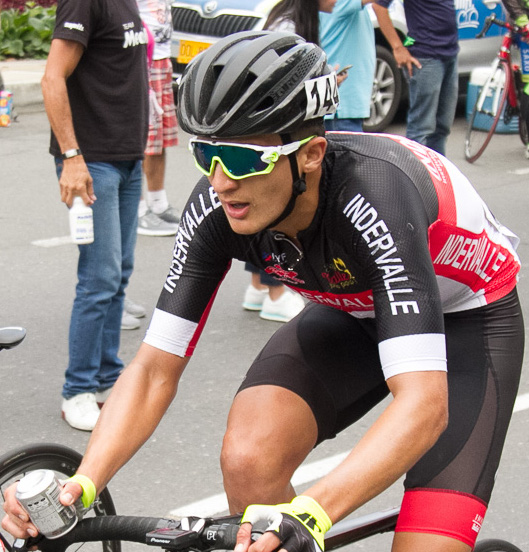
- Gómez in 2018

Personal information
- Full name: Bryan Steven Gómez Peñaloza
- Born: 19 November 1994 (age 31) Tuluá, Colombia

Cycling career
- Sport: Cycling
- Current team: Supergiros–Alcaldía de Manizales
- Disciplines: Road cycling; Track cycling
- Role: Rider
- Rider type: Sprinter

Amateur teams
- 2016–2017: Gateway Harley-Davidson Trek
- 2019: Supergiros–Alcaldía de Manizales

Professional teams
- 2014–2015: Champion System–Stan's NoTubes
- 2018: Holowesko Citadel p/b Arapahoe Resources
- 2019: Team Manzana Postobón
- 2020–: Equipo Continental Supergiros
Medal record
Representing Colombia
Event	1st	2nd	3rd
Nations Cup	0	1	0
Nations Cup stage	1	1	1
Pan American Games	0	1	1
Pan American Championships	1	4	0
CAC Games	1	0	0
South American Games	1	0	0
Bolivarian Games	1	0	0
Total	5	7	2
Men's track cycling
Nations Cup
Silver medal – second place	2021	Team pursuit
Pan American Games
Silver medal – second place	2019 Lima	Team pursuit
Pan American Championships
Gold medal – first place	2021 Lima	Points race
Silver medal – second place	2017 Couva	Scratch
Silver medal – second place	2021 Lima	Individual pursuit
Silver medal – second place	2024 Carson	Points race
Silver medal – second place	2024 Carson	Team pursuit
Central American and Caribbean Games
Gold medal – first place	2026 Santo Domingo	Team pursuit
South American Games
Gold medal – first place	2018 Cochabamba	Team pursuit
Bolivarian Games
Gold medal – first place	2025 Lima-Ayacucho	Team pursuit
Men's road cycling
Pan American Games
Bronze medal – third place	2019 Lima	Road race

Bryan Steven Gómez Peñaloza (born 19 November 1994) is a Colombian professional racing cyclist, who currently rides for UCI Continental team Supergiros–Alcaldía de Manizales. He rode in the men's team time trial at the 2015 UCI Road World Championships.

== Major results ==
2019
1st Stage 1 Tour de Taiwan
1st Stage 10 Vuelta a Guatemala
3rd Road race, Pan American Games
2022
8th Time trial, National Road Championships
