= Japanese torpedo boat Hato =

Two Japanese warships have borne the name Hato:

- Japanese torpedo boat Hato (1903), a Hayabusa-class torpedo boat launched in 1903 and stricken in 1923
- Japanese torpedo boat Hato (1937), an Ōtori-class torpedo boat launched in 1937 and sunk in 1944
