= Juan Ernesto Chamorro =

Colombian cyclist

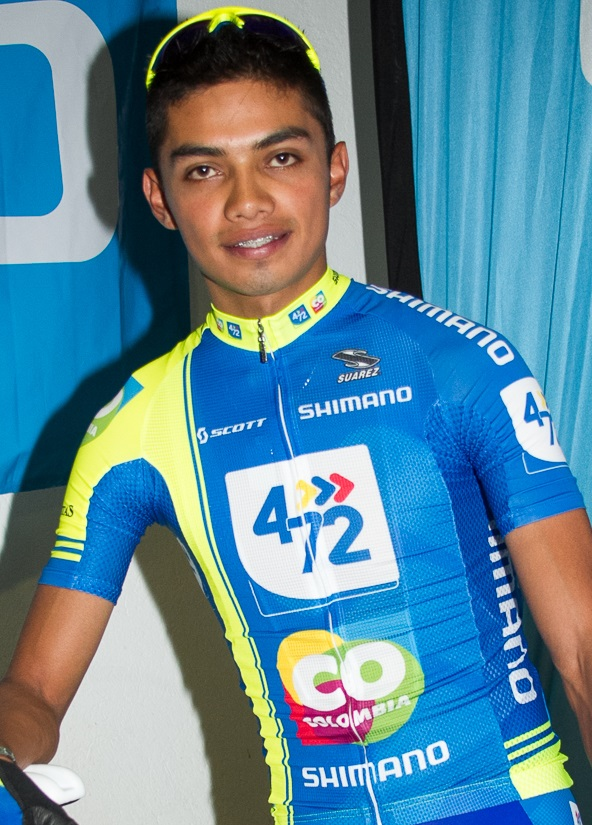

Personal information
- Full name: Juan Ernesto Chamorro Chitán
- Nickname: El Pupi
- Born: 18 November 1991 (age 34) Pupiales, Colombia

Cycling career
- Sport: Cycling
- Current team: 472-Colombia
- Discipline: Road
- Role: Rider

Professional team
- 2013–2014: 472-Colombia

Juan Ernesto Chamorro Chitán (born 18 November 1991 in Pupiales) is a Colombian cyclist.

== Palmares ==
2012
2nd Overall Tour de l'Avenir
10th Overall Tour de l'Ain
2013
1st Overall Ronde de l'Isard
