= Gran Premio Comité Olímpico Nacional =

Race details
- Date: December
- Region: Costa Rica
- Discipline: Road
- Competition: UCI America Tour
- Type: One day race

History
- First edition: 2018
- Editions: 1
- Final edition: 2018
- First winner: Óscar Quiroz (COL)
- Most wins: No repeat winners
- Final winner: Óscar Quiroz (COL)

The Gran Premio Comité Olímpico Nacional was a one-day cycling race held in Costa Rica. It only took place in 2018 as a category 1.2 event on the UCI America Tour.

== Winners ==
Year	Country	Rider	Team
2018	Colombia	Óscar Quiroz	Bicicletas Strongman–Colombia Coldeportes
