= Óscar Quiroz =

Colombian cyclist

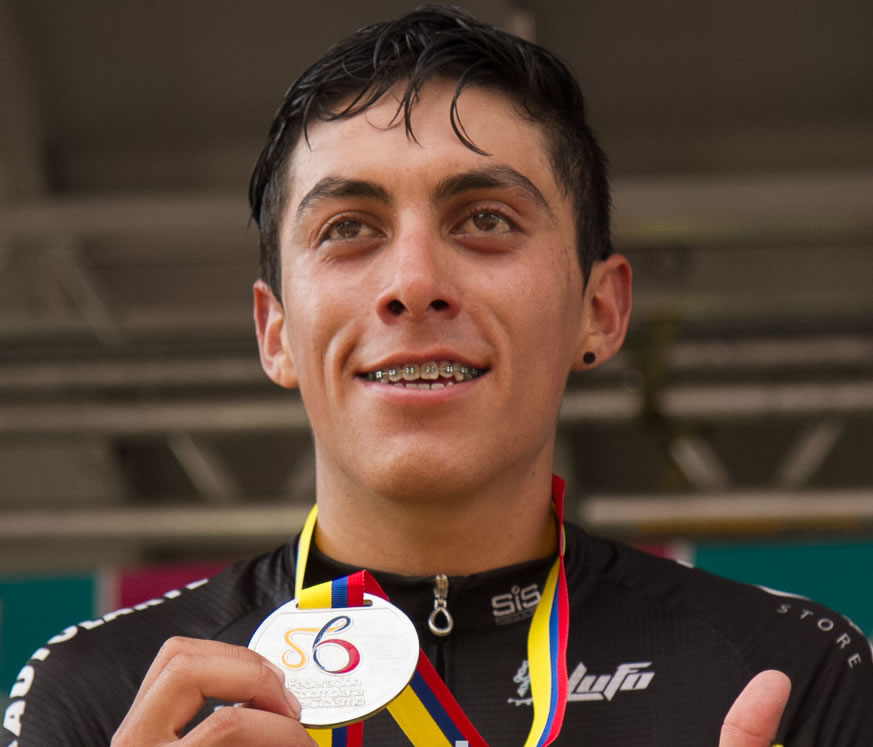
- Quiroz in 2018

Personal information
- Full name: Óscar Adalberto Quiroz Ayala
- Born: 3 July 1994 (age 32) Ipiales, Colombia

Cycling career
- Sport: Cycling
- Current team: Nu Colombia
- Discipline: Road
- Role: Rider

Amateur teams
- 2016: Mundial de Tornillos–Pijaos Web
- 2021: Colombia Tierra de Atletas–GW Bicicletas
- 2023: Colombia Pacto por el Deporte

Professional teams
- 2015: Orgullo Antioqueño
- 2017: GW–Shimano
- 2017: Burgos BH
- 2018–2019: Bicicletas Strongman–Colombia Coldeportes
- 2020: Colombia Tierra de Atletas–GW Bicicletas
- 2022: Colombia Tierra de Atletas–GW Shimano
- 2024–: Nu Colombia

Major wins
- One-day races and Classics National Road Race Championships (2019)

Óscar Adalberto Quiroz Ayala (born 3 July 1994) is a Colombian cyclist, who currently rides for UCI Continental team Nu Colombia.

== Major results ==
2017
3rd Road race, National Road Championships
2018
1st Gran Premio Comité Olímpico Nacional
1st Stage 2 Clásico RCN
2nd Road race, National Road Championships
6th Overall Vuelta a Costa Rica

1st Stage 9

9th Gran Premio FECOCI
2019
1st Road race, National Road Championships
1st Stages 3 & 8 Clásico RCN
1st Stage 11 Vuelta a Colombia
2020
1st Stage 3 Clásico RCN
2021
1st Stage 9 Vuelta a Colombia
1st Stage 3 Clásico RCN
2022
1st Stage 4 Vuelta a Colombia
1st Stage 2 Clásica de El Carmen de Viboral
2023
1st Stage 3 Vuelta a Boyacá
1st Stage 2 Clásica de El Carmen de Viboral
