= Anderson Paredes =

Colombian footballer (born 1984)

Personal information
- Full name: Anderson Paredes Gálvez
- Date of birth: 27 March 1984 (age 42)
- Place of birth: Cali, Colombia
- Height: 1.84 m (6 ft 1/2 in)
- Position: Striker

Senior career*
Years	Team	Apps	(Gls)
2004	Deportivo Pereira		
2005	Deportivo Pasto		
2007	Depor		
2009	Deportivo Cali		
- * Club domestic league appearances and goals

Anderson Paredes Gálvez (born 27 March 1984) is a Colombian football defender.

== Career ==
Born in Cali, Paredes began playing football with youth sides of Deportivo Cali. He joined the senior sides of Deportivo Pereira, Deportivo Pasto and Depor F.C., but he suffered four knee injuries which hampered his career. However, by 2009, he had recovered and joined the senior side of Deportivo Cali.

== See also ==
- Football in Colombia
- List of football clubs in Colombia
