= Miguel Bryon =

American cyclist (born 1995)

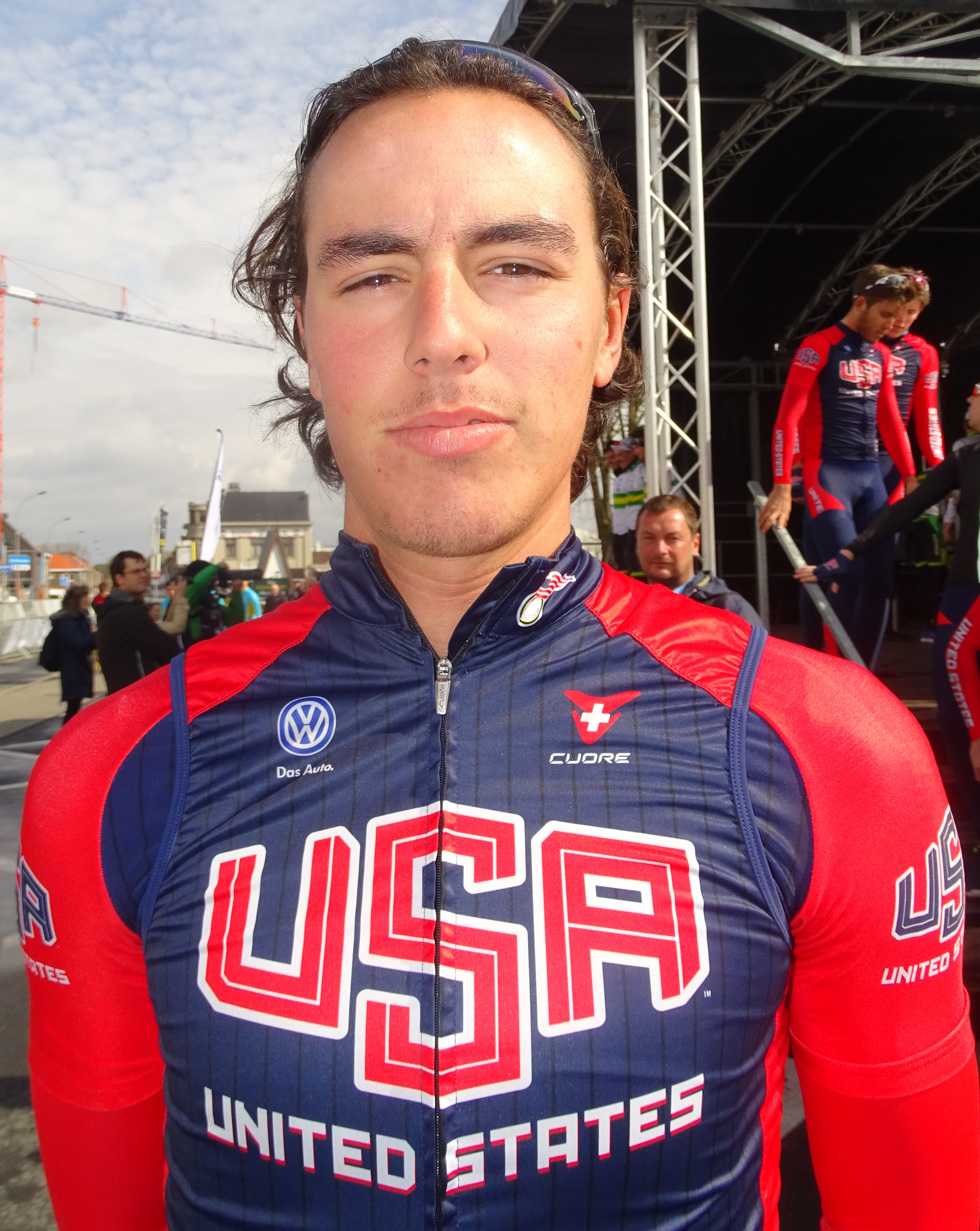
- Bryon in 2015

Personal information
- Full name: Miguel Bryon Jr.
- Born: January 10, 1995 (age 31) Miami, Florida

Cycling career
- Sport: Cycling
- Discipline: Road
- Role: Rider

Professional team
- 2014–2019: Hincapie Sportswear Development Team

Miguel Bryon Jr. (born January 10, 1995) is an American cyclist, who last rode for UCI Continental team Arapahoe Hincapie p/b BMC.

== Major results ==
2012
Tour de l'Abitibi

1st Stages 1 & 5

2013
2nd Ronde van Vlaanderen Juniores
