= BetPlay Cycling Team =

Colombian cycling team

Team information
- UCI code: BET
- Registered: Colombia
- Founded: 2018
- Discipline: Road
- Status: Club (2018); UCI Continental (2019); Club (2020–)

Team name history
- 2018–: BetPlay Cycling Team

The BetPlay Cycling Team is a Colombian cycling team founded in 2018. In 2019, the team upgraded to UCI Continental, but returned to being an amateur team in 2020.

== Team roster ==
As of 2019.

Rider	Date of birth
Brayan Baez (COL)	17 February 1995 (age 31)
Julián Cardona (COL)	24 January 1987 (age 39)
Nicolas David Garcia (COL)	8 February 1993 (age 33)
Elkin Sebastian Palmar Sierra (COL)	15 December 1997 (age 28)

Rider	Date of birth
Diego Fernando Ruiz (COL)	16 June 1994 (age 32)
Didier Alexander Sastoque Pulido (COL)	3 May 1987 (age 39)
Cristian Torres (COL)	21 October 1991 (age 34)
Norberto Wilches (COL)	29 August 1983 (age 43)
