= Deprisa Team =

Team information
- UCI code: DPA
- Registered: Bolivia
- Founded: 2019
- Disbanded: 2019
- Discipline: Road
- Status: UCI Continental

Team name history
- 2019–: Deprisa Team

The Deprisa Team was a Bolivian UCI Continental cycling team founded in 2019.

== Team roster ==
Roster in 2019:

- Iván Alaka (BOL)
- Heimarhanz Ariza (COL)
- Sebastián Caro (COL)
- Steven Cuesta (COL)
- Ángel Hoyos (BOL)
- Gustavo Olmos (BOL)
- Jahir Pérez (COL)
- Albeiro Rabón (COL)
- Bacilio Ramos (BOL)
- Jheyson Ramos (BOL)
- Wilber Rodríguez (BOL)

== Major wins ==
2019
Stage 7 Vuelta a la Independencia Nacional, Sebastián Caro
