= Coldeportes Bicicletas Strongman =

Bicicletas Strongman–Colombia Coldeportes
Team information
- UCI code: BSM
- Registered: Colombia
- Founded: 2015
- Disbanded: 2019
- Discipline: Road
- Status: UCI Continental

Team name history
- 2015 2016 2017 2018 2019: Strongman–Campagnolo; Strongman Campagnolo Willier; Bicicletas Strongman; Bicicletas Strongman–Colombia Coldeportes; Coldeportas Bicicletas Strongman

Coldeportes Bicicletas Strongman was a UCI Continental team founded in 2015 and based in Colombia. It participates in UCI Continental Circuits races.

== Team roster ==
Rider	Date of birth
Rubén Dario Acosta (COL)	20 August 1996 (age 30)
Heimarhanz Ariza Jaramillo (COL)	3 November 1997 (age 28)
Aristóbulo Cala (COL)	13 May 1990 (age 36)
Steven Calderón (COL)	25 December 1993 (age 32)
Johnatan Cañaveral (COL)	2 November 1996 (age 29)
Diego Fernando Cano (COL)	3 February 1994 (age 32)

Rider	Date of birth
Eduardo Estrada (COL)	25 January 1995 (age 31)
Javier Steven Gonzalez (COL)	13 December 1995 (age 30)
Brayan Hernandez (COL)	11 March 1997 (age 29)
William David Muñoz (COL)	17 January 1994 (age 32)
Victor Ocampo (COL)	19 June 1999 (age 27)
Andres Camil Pedroza (COL)	20 March 1996 (age 30)
Oscar Adalberto Quiroz (COL)	3 July 1994 (age 32)
Wildy Sandoval (COL)	13 January 1995 (age 31)

== Major wins ==
2016
Pan American Road Race Championships, Jonathan Caicedo
Stage 10 Vuelta a Costa Rica, Carlos Becerra
Stage 12 Vuelta a Costa Rica, Jonathan Caicedo

2017
Overall Vuelta a Colombia, Aristóbulo Cala

2018
Gran Premio FECOCI, William David Muñoz
Gran Premio Comite Olímpico Nacional, Oscar Adalberto Quiroz
Stage 8 Vuelta a Costa Rica, Johnatan Cañaveral
Stage 9 Vuelta a Costa Rica, Oscar Adalberto Quiroz
Stage 10 Vuelta a Costa Rica, Aristóbulo Cala

2019
National Road Race Championships, Oscar Adalberto Quiroz

== National champions ==
2019
Colombian Road Race, Oscar Adalberto Quiroz
