= Hato, Santander =

Coordinates: 6°35′N 73°20′W

- Municipality and town
- Flag Coat of arms

- Location of the municipality and town of Hato, Santander in the Santander Department of Colombia.
- Country: Colombia
- Department: Santander Department
- Time zone: UTC-5 (Colombia Standard Time)

Hato (Spanish pronunciation: [ˈato]) is a town and municipality in the Santander Department in northeastern Colombia.
