= Diego Ochoa (cyclist) =

Colombian cyclist

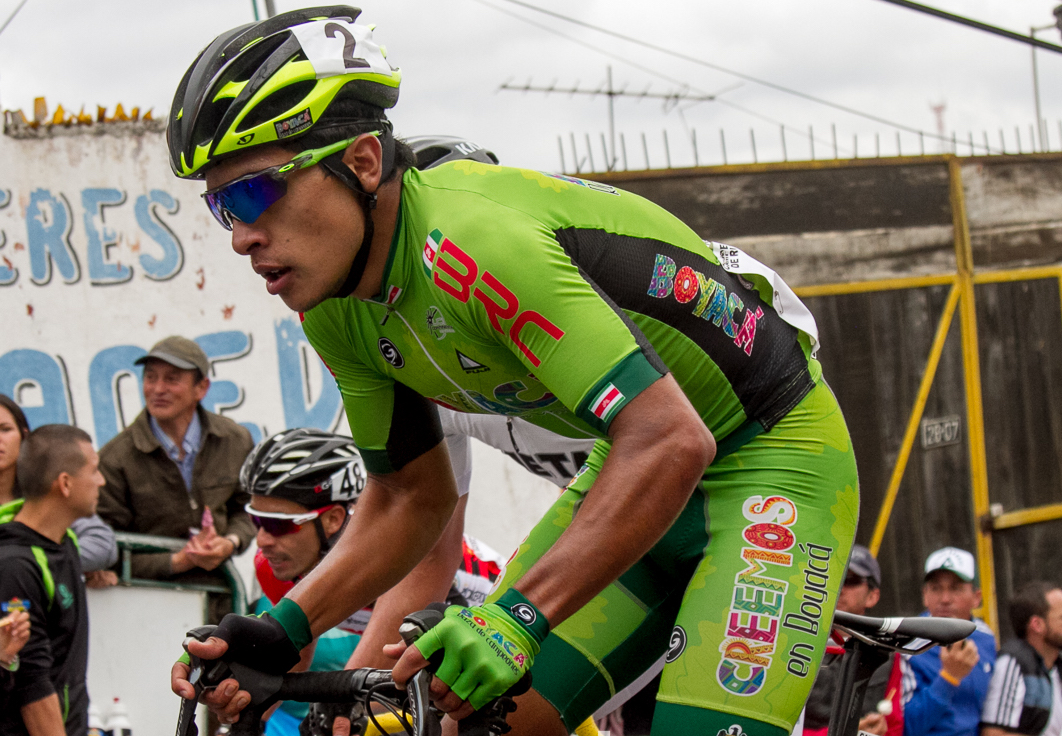
- Ochoa in 2016

Personal information
- Full name: Diego Antonio Ochoa Camargo
- Born: 5 June 1993 (age 33) Paipa, Colombia
- Height: 1.7 m (5 ft 7 in)
- Weight: 61 kg (134 lb)

Cycling career
- Sport: Cycling
- Current team: Team Saitel
- Discipline: Road
- Role: Rider
- Rider type: Climbing specialist

Amateur teams
- 2012: Alcaldía de Tunja–Proactiva–IRDET
- 2019: EBSA–Empresa de Energía Boyacá
- 2021–2023: EPM–Scott

Professional teams
- 2013–2014: 4-72 Colombia
- 2015: Movistar Team América
- 2016: Boyacá Raza de Campeones
- 2017–2018: EPM
- 2019: Team Manzana Postobón
- 2020: EPM–Scott
- 2024–: Team Saitel

Diego Antonio Ochoa Camargo (born 5 June 1993) is a Colombian racing cyclist, who currently rides for UCI Continental team Team Saitel. He has previously ridden for 4-72 Colombia/Team Manzana Postobón, the Movistar Team América, Boyacá Raza de Campeones and EPM–Scott.

== Major results ==
2010
2nd Road race, National Junior Road Championships
2013
3rd Overall Coupe des nations Ville Saguenay
5th Circuito de Getxo
6th Overall Tour de Gironde
7th Overall Vuelta Ciclista a León

1st Mountains classification

2014
1st Road race, National Under-23 Road Championships
1st Mountains classification Tour de Gironde
1st Prologue Giro della Valle d'Aosta
8th Overall Vuelta Mexico Telmex

1st Stage 3

10th Overall Tour do Brasil
2016
2nd Overall Vuelta a la Independencia Nacional

1st Points classification
1st Stage 6

2018
3rd Road race, National Road Championships
2019
5th Overall Tour de Taiwan
2023
1st Stage 1 Vuelta a Antioquia
