= Gran Premio FECOCI =

Race details
- Date: December
- Region: Costa Rica
- Discipline: Road
- Competition: UCI America Tour
- Type: One day race

History
- First edition: 2018
- Editions: 1 (as of 2018)
- First winner: William Muñoz (COL)
- Most wins: No repeat winners
- Most recent: William Muñoz (COL)

The Gran Premio FECOCI (officially the Gran Premio Federación Costarricense de Ciclismo) is a one-day cycling race held annually in Costa Rica. It was first held in 2018 as part of the UCI America Tour in category 1.2.

== Winners ==
Year	Country	Rider	Team
2018	Colombia	William Muñoz	
