= Team Manzana Postobón =

Cycling team

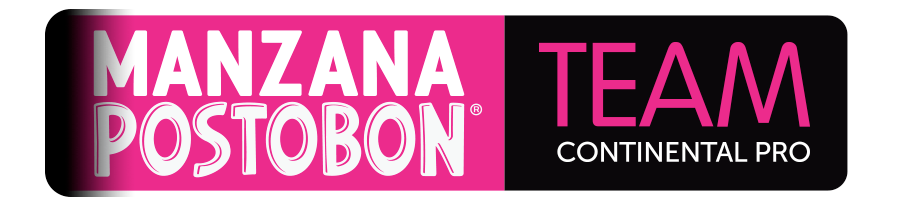

Team information
- UCI code: MZN
- Registered: Colombia
- Founded: 2006
- Disbanded: 2019
- Discipline: Road
- Status: National (2006); UCI Continental (2007–2014); National (2015); UCI Continental (2016); UCI Professional Continental (2017–2019)
- Bicycles: Gios

Key personnel
- Team manager: Luis Fernando Saldarriaga

Team name history
- 2006 2007 2008–2009 2010 2011–2012 2012–2014 2015–2019: Colombia es Pasión; Colombia es Pasión Team; Colombia es Pasión Coldeportes; Café de Colombia-Colombia es Pasión; Colombia es Pasión-Café de Colombia; 4-72 Colombia; Team Manzana Postobón

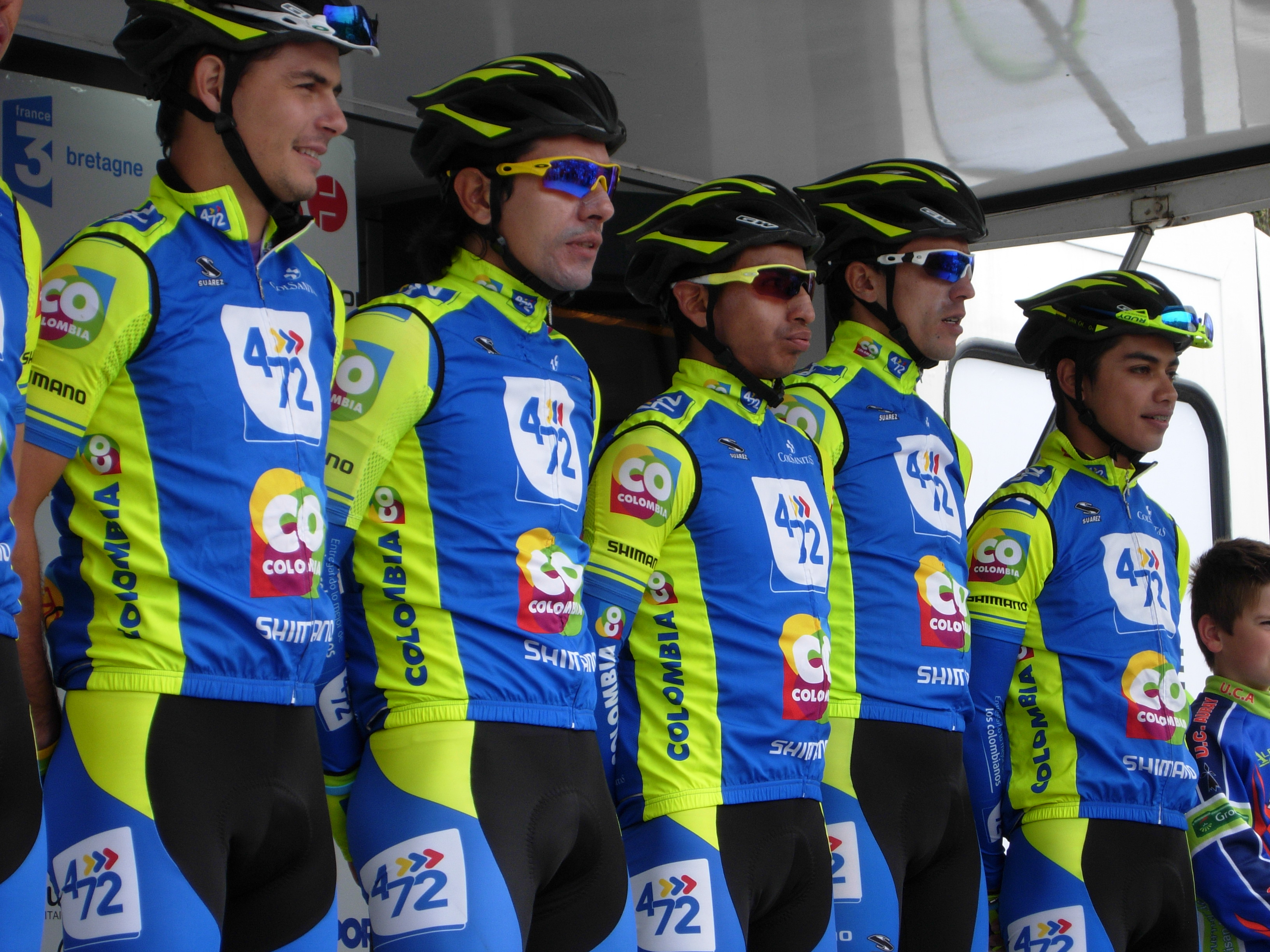

Team Manzana Postobón (UCI team code: MZN) was a UCI Professional Continental cycling team based in Colombia. The team was founded in 2006, becoming a Continental team in 2007. In 2015, the team competed as a club, before returning to Continental status the following year. From 2017 until its disbanding in 2019 the team held Professional Continental status.

In 2016 the team had quality to finally jump up to the Pro Continental level for 2017, the first Colombian professional team in that level since Team Colombia cycling team in 2015.

On May 25, 2019, the team announced that it would fold with immediate effect after two doping cases had been announced.

== Doping ==
In April 2019 the team terminated Wilmar Paredes’ contract after the UCI announced that he had tested positive for EPO.

In May 2019 Juan José Amador notified of an adverse analytical finding for the banned steroid, Boldenone an out-of-competition control held on 22 October 2018. According to UCI anti-doping regulation 7.12.1, the team will now be suspended for a period of between 15 and 45 days, to be decided by the UCI Disciplinary Commission, due to the team registering a second adverse analytical finding within a 12-month period.

== Final team roster ==
As of 20 January 2019.

Rider	Date of birth
Juan José Amador (COL)	20 April 1998 (age 28)
Luis Carlos Chía (COL)	18 February 1997 (age 29)
Jhojan García (COL)	10 January 1998 (age 28)
Bryan Gómez (COL)	19 November 1994 (age 31)
Daniel Jaramillo (COL)	15 January 1991 (age 35)
Omar Mendoza (COL)	25 November 1989 (age 36)
Diego Ochoa (COL)	5 June 1993 (age 33)
Juan Felipe Osorio (COL)	30 January 1995 (age 31)

Rider	Date of birth
Wilmar Paredes (COL)	27 April 1996 (age 30)
Jordan Parra (COL)	19 April 1994 (age 32)
Carlos Quintero (COL)	5 March 1986 (age 40)
Jhonatan Restrepo (COL)	28 November 1994 (age 31)
Aldemar Reyes (COL)	22 April 1995 (age 31)
Nicolás Sáenz (COL)	7 August 1997 (age 29)
Yecid Sierra (COL)	16 August 1994 (age 32)
Bernardo Suaza (COL)	28 November 1992 (age 33)

== Major wins ==
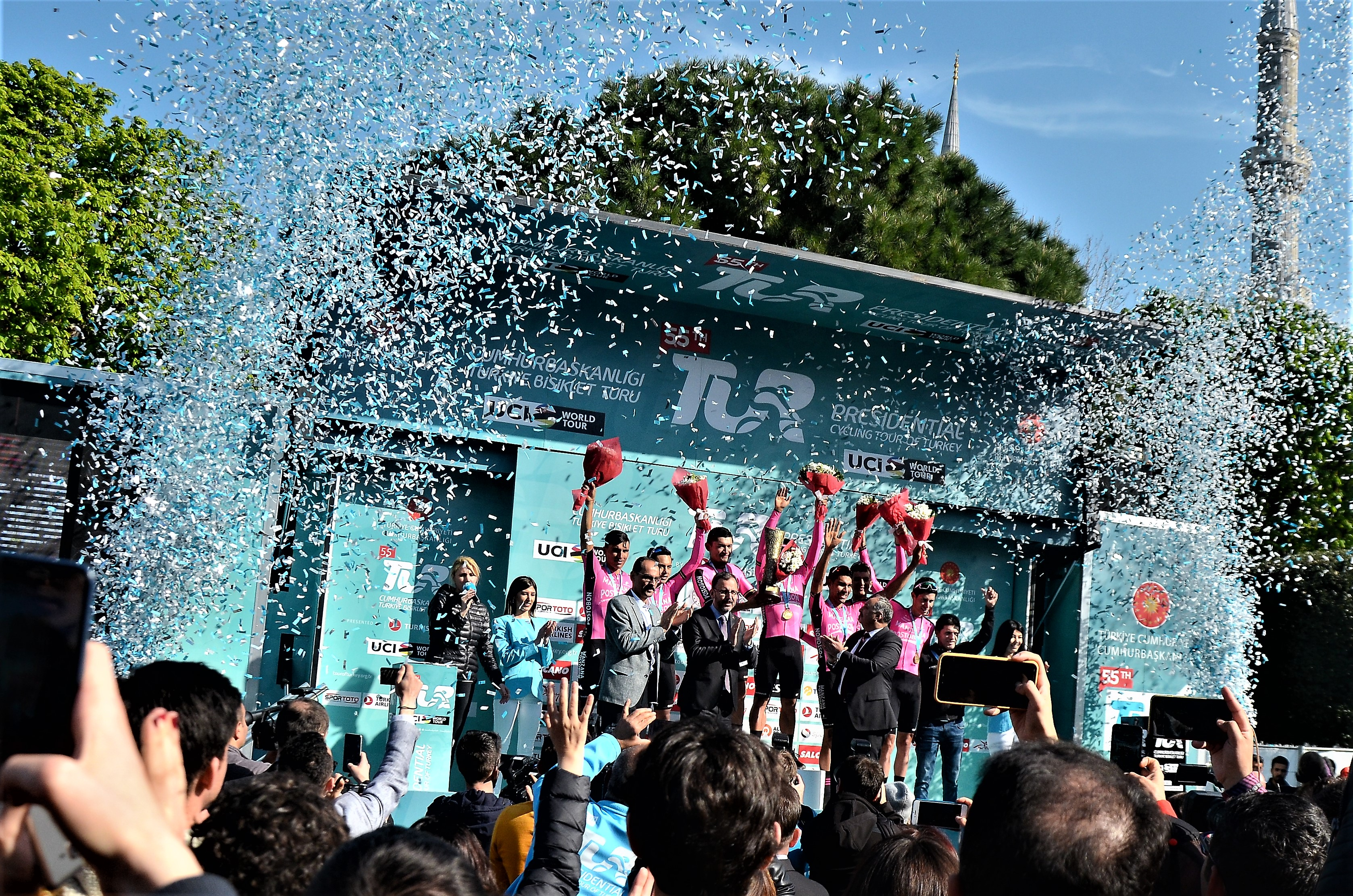
Team Manzana Postobón, winner of the 55th Presidential Tour of Turkey 2019.

2007
Stage 5 Ronde de l'Isard, Oscar Sanchez
Overall Clásico Ciclístico Banfoandes, Sergio Luis Henao

Stage 4 & 6, Sergio Luis Henao

Stage 3 Vuelta a Guatemala, Jairo Salas
2008
Stage 6 Vuelta a Colombia, Rafael Montiel
Stage 12 Vuelta a Colombia, Wilson Marentes
Stage 4 Vuelta a Guatemala, Jesus Castaño
Stage 5 Vuelta a Guatemala, Jeffry Romero
2009
Overall Cinturón a Mallorca, Sergio Luis Henao

Stage 4, Sergio Luis Henao

Stage 3 Vuelta a Colombia, Fabio Duarte
Overall Tour des Pyrénées, Fabio Duarte

Stage 2 Fabio Duarte

2010
Stage 4 Vuelta a Asturias, Fabio Duarte
Overall Circuito Montañés, Fabio Duarte

Stage 4, Fabio Duarte

Stage 5 & 12 Vuelta a Colombia, Fabio Duarte
Stage 6 Vuelta a Colombia, Luis Felipe Laverde
2011
Stage 7 Vuelta a Colombia, Jarlinson Pantano
2013
Overall Ronde de l'Isard, Juan Ernesto Chamorro

Stage 3, Heiner Parra

Stage 4 Vuelta al Sur de Bolivia, Camilo Suárez
Stage 5 Vuelta al Sur de Bolivia, Edson Calderón
2014
Overall Vuelta Mexico Telmex, Juan Pablo Villegas

Stages 1, 4 & 5 (ITT), Juan Pablo Villegas
Stage 3, Diego Ochoa

Colombia National U23 Road Race Championships, Diego Ochoa
Overall Giro della Valle d'Aosta, Bernardo Suaza

Prologue, Diego Ochoa

2016
Stage 1 Vuelta a la Comunidad de Madrid, Juan Sebastián Molano
Stage 4 Vuelta a Colombia, Juan Sebastián Molano
2017
Stages 3 & 5 Volta ao Alentejo, Juan Sebastián Molano
Stage 2 Vuelta a Colombia, Wilmar Paredes
Stage 12 Vuelta a Colombia, Juan Pablo Villegas
2018
Pan American Cycling Championships Road Race, Juan Sebastián Molano
Overall Tour of Qinghai Lake, Hernán Aguirre

Stages 4 & 6, Hernán Aguirre

Stage 2 & 3 Tour of Xingtai, Juan Sebastián Molano
Overall Tour of China I, Juan Sebastián Molano

Stage 2, Juan Sebastián Molano

Stage 1 Tour of China II, Juan Sebastián Molano
Stages 1 & 2 Tour of Taihu Lake, Juan Sebastián Molano
Stages 6 Tour of Taihu Lake, Jordan Parra
2019
Stage 1 Tour de Taiwan, Bryan Gómez
Stage 1 Vuelta a Asturias, Carlos Quintero

== National champions ==
2014
Colombian U23 Road Race Championship, Diego Ochoa
