= Coldeportes Zenú =

Colombian cycling team

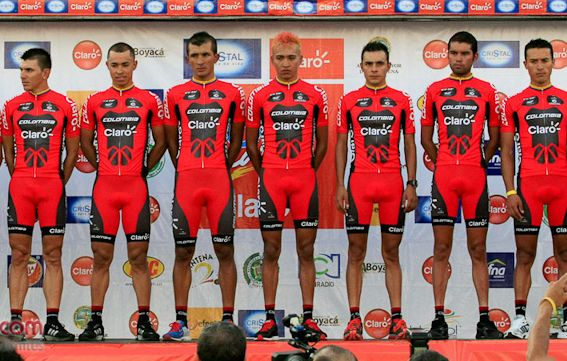

Team information
- UCI code: ECZ
- Registered: Colombia
- Founded: 2012
- Disbanded: 2019
- Discipline: Road
- Status: UCI Continental (2012–2013, 2017–2019); Amateur (2014–2016)

Team name history
- 2012 2013 2014–2017 2018 2019: Coldeportes–Comcel; Colombia–Coldeportes; Coldeportes-Claro; Coldeportes Zenú Sello Rojo; Coldeportes Zenú

Coldeportes Zenú was a Colombian UCI Continental cycling team founded in 2012.

== Doping ==
In May 2019 the UCI also announced the provisional suspension of Alex Norberto Cano Ardila due to abnormalities detected in his biological passport.

== Team roster ==
Rider	Date of birth
Juan Diego Alba (COL)	11 September 1997 (age 28)
Julio Alexis Camacho (COL)	20 June 1990 (age 36)
Alex Cano (COL)	13 March 1983 (age 43)
German Enrique Chavez (COL)	9 March 1995 (age 31)
Diego Alejandro Jaramillo Velez Diego (COL)	3 September 1999 (age 27)
Daniel Alejando Largo (COL)	18 October 1997 (age 28)
Luis Felipe Laverde (COL)	6 July 1979 (age 47)
John Edibberto Martinez (COL)	13 May 1983 (age 43)
Juan Martin Mesa (COL)	23 January 1992 (age 34)
Cristian Camilo Munoz (COL)	20 March 1996 (age 30)
Dalivier Ospina (COL)	9 October 1985 (age 40)
Andres Pineda (COL)	3 May 1998 (age 28)
Miguel Ángel Rubiano (COL)	3 October 1984 (age 41)

== Major wins ==
2012
Stage 1 Vuelta a Bolivia
Stage 3 (TTT) Vuelta a Bolivia, Juan Alejandro Garcia
Stages 6 & 10b Vuelta a Bolivia, Edward Stiver Ortiz
Stages 3 (ITT) & 9 Vuelta Internacional a Costa Rica, Marlon Alirio Pérez

2015
Stage 7 Vuelta a Colombia, Camilo Andrés Gómez
Stage 12 Vuelta a Colombia, Luis Felipe Laverde

2017
Panamerican Road Race Championships, Nelson Soto
Stages 3, 10 & 11 Vuelta a Colombia, Nelson Soto
Stage 5 & 8 (ITT) Vuelta a Colombia, Alex Cano

2018
Stage 8 Giro Ciclistico d'Italia, Cristian Camilo Muñoz
