= Juan Pablo Suárez =

Juan Pablo Suárez may refer to:

- Juan Pablo Suárez (journalist) (born 1960s), Argentinian journalist
- Juan Pablo Suárez (cyclist) (born 1985), Colombian cyclist
