= Juan Pablo Suárez (journalist) =

Juan Pablo Suárez is an Argentinian journalist who is the editor of the news website Última Hora. His wife, Sandra Wede, is the owner of Ultima Hora. He was arrested while covering a public protest on 9 December 2013 and charged with sedition under an anti-terrorism law.

Suárez was 45 years old at the time of his arrest.

== Career ==
He began working in 2007 for Última Hora, which is based in the city of Santiago del Estero, the capital of the province of the same name.

== Arrest and detention ==
At shortly after 9 p.m. on the night of 9 December 2013, Suárez, who was at the newspaper's offices, became aware that a protest for higher wages for police officers was taking place in Leopoldo Lugones Square. There were no reporters available at the offices at that hour to cover the story, so Suárez took a microphone and went out into the streets with a cameraman. They filmed the arrest and the aggressive police treatment of a protesting police officer, Norberto Villagrán, who was taken into custody in the presence of his wife and their daughters, aged 8 and 11.

According to Perfil, policemen were protesting across the country for higher salaries on that day, but Villagran was the only police officer who decided to demonstrate in the city of Santiago del Estero. Sandra Wede later said that Villagrán had been peacefully protesting when he was “attacked” by a group of policemen who arrested him and pushed him into a police car. Villagrán had reportedly spent a week in prison the previous year for saying that there were irregularities in police funds.

After filming Villagrán's arrest, Suárez returned directly to the offices of Última Hora, where he posted a video of the arrest on the newspaper's website. Only minutes later, at about 10 p.m., approximately 30 police officers wearing hoods entered the newspaper's offices and handled him brutally. They took him into custody without having any arrest warrant or detention order, although they told him they had oral permission from Judge Rosa Falco to arrest him. He did not resist arrest.

The police seized two computers and a cell phone. “They did not respect the chain of custody of seized items,” Suárez later maintained. “They took my notebook, a CPU and a cellphone with all my sources," Suárez said, accusing them of “violating professional confidentiality.” Wede later said that Falco had ordered her to hand over the video taken by Suárez in the square. Falco had also told Wede that she had the right to verbally authorise a raid and that she did not want the video of Villagrán to be used politically.

Última Hora condemned the arrest and detention of Suárez and stated “that the real reason behind the raid and the arrest is to cover up violent police behaviour.” Víctor Daniel Nazar, Suárez's lawyer, called the accusation against his client “extremely grave....In all my years in this profession I have never seen such a serious violation of legal rights.”

On 18 December 2013, the Committee to Protect Journalists called on Argentinian authorities to immediately release Suárez, who at that point had been detained for over a week. “It is ludicrous that a journalist be accused of sedition and spend nine days in jail solely for filming a protest and arrest,” said Carlos Lauría, CPJ's senior Americas program coordinator. “We urge Argentine authorities to drop the absurd accusations against Juan Pablo Suárez and release him immediately.” Gabriel Levinas, a reporter with Radio Mitre and editor of the news website Plazademayo, told CPJ that he had seen Suárez's file and that there was no evidence to support allegations of sedition.

Suárez was held in custody for ten days. It was reported on 19 December that Suárez had been released. Wede went to Buenos Aires to try to get national coverage for the case. She met with the head of the LED Foundation, Silvana Giudici, and with opposition representatives. The Argentinian Journalists Forum (FOPEA) expressed concern about the “legal technical framework” employed by the judge. The Association of Argentinian Journalism Entities (ADEPA) also expressed “deep concern” about the case. On 19 December, opposition MPs gathered to demand free-speech guarantees. Judge Falco called Suárez in for questioning but later declined jurisdiction and sent the case to the federal courts.

He was released, but on 13 May 2014 faced federal Judge Guillermo Molinari and prosecutor Pedro Simón, the latter of whom called for him to be tried for sedition under the anti-terrorism act, a crime for which he could be imprisoned for 12 years. Other charges included “inciting collective violence” and “terrorizing the population.” La Nación compared the “labyrinthine judicial process” to which he was subjected to the trial of Joseph K. in Kafka's The Trial.

On 14 May 2014, Reporters Without Borders condemned the charges against Suárez. “We call for the immediate withdrawal of these absurd charges against Suárez,” said Camille Soulier, the head of the ROB Americas desk. “How can filming an arrest be construed as a terrorist activity? By using the anti-terrorism law against a journalist for the first time, the Santiago del Estero authorities are sending a clear message that they will tolerate no criticism.” Suárez's lawyer, Víctor Nazar, told Reporters Without Borders: “There are no legal grounds for the sedition charge and still less for applying the anti-terrorism law because the only thing Suárez did was cover a protest for more pay. The reasons are political. He is the only journalist who firmly criticizes the government’s policies and the only one to cover all the pay demands.”

On 20 May 2014, Suárez met with members of the national legislature at an open hearing about his case. At the meeting, Suárez said “I do not believe in justice.” He noted that the prosecutor in his case, Simón, was allegedly guilty of an “illegal land grab.” He said it was better to go to jail “than to live on your knees.” Deputy Omar Duclós stated that it was undemocratic to persecute journalist in this way. “We are facing a clear attack on the freedom of expression of a media worker performing his duties by an ally of the Kirchner provincial government.” Deputy Laura Alonso said that the parliamentary Committee on Freedom of Expression had traditionally defended journalists in such situations, but that this was no longer the case because such committees had been “captured” and were now “owned.”

At the meeting with national legislators, Suárez said of the charges against him: “This is not a message for me, but for all of independent journalism.” He maintained that his arrest and prosecution were connected to the fact that he had questioned the conduct of the provincial governor Zamora and Zamora's wife, Claudia Ledesma Abdala, provisional president of the Senate. Suárez described the news media in Santiago del Estero as being divided between those who fear the government and those that have deals with the government. He was detained with five criminals in a cell barely more than one square meter in size. He was in detention for ten days, during which was hospitalized for dehydration after beginning a hunger strike to protest his treatment.

On 23 May, Guillermo Molinari stated he would prosecute Suárez not for terrorism and sedition but for incitement to commit a crime. According to one report, Molinari “decided to keep this accusation based on evidence allegedly found in the mobile phones of Suárez and Nelson Villagrán.” Molinari officially ruled on 28 May that Suárez and Villagran should be prosecuted for inciting violence, but he dismissed the request of prosecutor Pedro Simón that they be tied for sedition under the Terrorism Act.
