= 2020 in men's road cycling =

2020 in men's road cycling is about the 2020 men's bicycle races governed by the UCI. The races are part of the UCI Road Calendar.

== World Championships ==
The World Road Championships took place in Imola, Italy from 20 to 27 September 2020. The competition was set to be held in Aigle and Martigny, Switzerland, but was moved due to the Covid-19 crisis.

Events at the 2020 UCI Road World Championships
Race	Date	Winner	Second	Third	Ref
Individual Time Trial	September 25	Filippo Ganna (ITA)	Wout van Aert (BEL)	Stefan Küng (SWI)	
Road Race	September 27	Julian Alaphilippe (FRA)	Wout van Aert (BEL)	Marc Hirschi (SWI)	

== Grand Tours ==
Grand Tours in the 2020 season
Race	Date	Winner	Second	Third	Ref
Tour de France	August 29 – September 20	Tadej Pogačar (SLO)	Primož Roglič (SLO)	Richie Porte (AUS)	
(Italy) Giro d'Italia	October 3 – October 25	Tao Geoghegan Hart (GBR)	Jai Hindley (AUS)	Wilco Kelderman (NED)	
(Spain) Vuelta a España	October 20 – November 8	Primož Roglič (SLO)	Richard Carapaz (ECU)	Hugh Carthy (GBR)	

== UCI World Tour ==
For the 2020 season, the UCI World Tour calendar contains the same events as in 2019, with the exception of the Tour of California which has been placed on hiatus and the Presidential Tour of Turkey, which was demoted to the newly introduced ProSeries.

Race	Date	Winner	Second	Third	Ref
(Australia) Santos Tour Down Under	January 21–26	Richie Porte (AUS)	Diego Ulissi (ITA)	Simon Geschke (GER)	
(Australia) Cadel Evans Great Ocean Road Race	February 2	Dries Devenyns (BEL)	Pavel Sivakov (RUS)	Daryl Impey (RSA)	
(United Arab Emirates) UAE Tour	February 23–29	Adam Yates (GBR)	Tadej Pogačar (SVN)	Alexey Lutsenko (KAZ)	
(Belgium) Omloop Het Nieuwsblad	February 29	Jasper Stuyven (BEL)	Yves Lampaert (BEL)	Søren Kragh Andersen (DEN)	
(France) Paris–Nice	March 8–15	Maximilian Schachmann (GER)	Tiesj Benoot (BEL)	Sergio Higuita (COL)	
(Spain) Volta Ciclista a Catalunya	March 23–29	Cancelled			
(Belgium) Record Bank E3 Harelbeke	March 27	Cancelled			
(Spain) Vuelta al País Vasco	April 6–11	Cancelled			
(Switzerland) Tour de Romandie	April 28 – May 3	Cancelled			
(Switzerland) Tour de Suisse	June 6–14	Cancelled			
(Spain) Clásica Ciclista San Sebastián	July 25	Cancelled			
(Italy) Strade Bianche	August 1 (Note: The Strade Bianche was scheduled for 7 March, but was postponed due to the COVID-19 pandemic in Italy.)	Wout van Aert (BEL)	Davide Formolo (ITA)	Maximilian Schachmann (GER)	
(Poland) Tour de Pologne	August 5–9 (Note: The Tour de Pologne was scheduled between 5 and 11 July, but was postponed due to the COVID-19 pandemic in Poland.)	Remco Evenepoel (BEL)	Jakob Fuglsang (DEN)	Simon Yates (GBR)	
(Italy) Milan–San Remo	August 8 (Note: The Milan–San Remo was scheduled for 21 March, but was postponed due to the COVID-19 pandemic in Italy.)	Wout van Aert (BEL)	Julian Alaphilippe (FRA)	Michael Matthews (AUS)	
(France) Critérium du Dauphiné	August 12–16 (Note: The Critérium du Dauphiné was scheduled between 31 May and 7 June, but was postponed due to the COVID-19 pandemic in France.)	Daniel Martínez (COL)	Thibaut Pinot (FRA)	Guillaume Martin (FRA)	
(Italy) Il Lombardia	August 15 (Note: Il Lombardia was initially scheduled for 10 October. The race was first rescheduled for 31 October with the May calendar update, and subsequently to 15 August with the June calendar update.)	Jakob Fuglsang (DEN)	George Bennett (NZL)	Aleksandr Vlasov (RUS)	
(United Kingdom) Prudential RideLondon–Surrey Classic	August 16	Cancelled			
Bretagne Classic Ouest-France	August 25	Michael Matthews (AUS)	Luka Mezgec (SLO)	Florian Sénéchal (FRA)	
(Italy) Tirreno–Adriatico	September 7–14 (Note: The Tirreno–Adriatico was scheduled between 11 and 17 March, but was postponed due to the COVID-19 pandemic in Italy.)	Simon Yates (GBR)	Geraint Thomas (GBR)	Rafał Majka (POL)	
(Canada) Grand Prix Cycliste de Québec	September 11	Cancelled			
(Canada) Grand Prix Cycliste de Montréal	September 13	Cancelled			
(Belgium) (Netherlands) BinckBank Tour	September 29 – October 3	Mathieu van der Poel (NED)	Søren Kragh Andersen (DEN)	Stefan Küng (SUI)	
(Belgium) La Flèche Wallonne	September 30 (Note: The La Flèche Wallonne was scheduled for 22 April, but was postponed due to the COVID-19 pandemic in Belgium.)	Marc Hirschi (SUI)	Benoît Cosnefroy (FRA)	Michael Woods (CAN)	
(Belgium) Liège–Bastogne–Liège	October 4 (Note: The Liège–Bastogne–Liège was scheduled for 26 April, but was postponed due to the COVID-19 pandemic in Belgium.)	Primož Roglič (SLO)	Marc Hirschi (SUI)	Tadej Pogačar (SLO)	
(Netherlands) Amstel Gold Race	October 10 (Note: The Amstel Gold Race was scheduled for 19 April, but was postponed due to the COVID-19 pandemic in the Netherlands. On 30 September the race was cancelled altogether.)	Cancelled			
(Belgium) Gent–Wevelgem	October 11 (Note: The Gent–Wevelgem was scheduled for 29 March, but was postponed due to the COVID-19 pandemic in Belgium.)	Mads Pedersen (DEN)	Florian Sénéchal (FRA)	Matteo Trentin (ITA)	
(Belgium) Dwars door Vlaanderen	October 14 (Note: The Dwars door Vlaanderen was scheduled for 1 April, but was postponed and later on cancelled due to the COVID-19 pandemic in Belgium.)	Cancelled			
(China) Gree-Tour of Guangxi	October 15–20	Cancelled			
(Belgium) Ronde van Vlaanderen	October 18 (Note: The Ronde van Vlaanderen was scheduled for 5 April, but was postponed due to the COVID-19 pandemic in Belgium.)	Mathieu van der Poel (NED)	Wout Van Aert (BEL)	Alexander Kristoff (NOR)	
(Belgium) Three Days of Bruges–De Panne	October 21 (Note: The Three Days of Bruges–De Panne was scheduled for 25 March, but was postponed due to the COVID-19 pandemic in Belgium.)	Yves Lampaert (BEL)	Tim Declercq (BEL)	Tim Merlier (BEL)	
(France) Paris–Roubaix	October 25 (Note: The Paris–Roubaix was scheduled for 12 April, but was postponed due to the COVID-19 pandemic in France. On 9 October the race was cancelled altogether.)	Cancelled			
(Germany) EuroEyes Cyclassics Hamburg	TBC	Cancelled			
(Germany) Eschborn-Frankfurt	TBC	Cancelled			

== UCI tours ==
Tour	Individual champion	Team champion	Nations champion
World Tour			No nation ranking
Africa Tour			
America Tour			
Asia Tour			
Europe Tour			
Oceania Tour			

== 2.Pro Category Races ==
Race	Date	Winner	Second	Third	Ref
(Argentina) Vuelta a San Juan	January 26 – February 2	Remco Evenepoel (BEL)	Filippo Ganna (ITA)	Óscar Sevilla (ESP)	
(Spain) Volta a la Comunitat Valenciana	February 5 – 9	Tadej Pogačar (SVN)	Jack Haig (AUS)	Tao Geoghegan Hart (GBR)	
(Malaysia) Le Tour de Langkawi	February 7 – 14	Danilo Celano (ITA)	Yevgeniy Fedorov (KAZ)	Artem Ovechkin (RUS)	
(France) Tour de la Provence	February 13 – 16	Nairo Quintana (COL)	Aleksandr Vlasov (RUS)	Alexey Lutsenko (KAZ)	
(Spain) Vuelta a Andalucía Ruta Ciclista del Sol	February 19 – 23	Jakob Fuglsang (DEN)	Jack Haig (AUS)	Mikel Landa (ESP)	
(Portugal) Volta ao Algarve em Bicicleta	February 19 – 23	Remco Evenepoel (BEL)	Maximilian Schachmann (GER)	Miguel Ángel López (COL)	
(China) Tour of Hainan	February 23 – March 1	Cancelled			
Presidential Tour of Turkey	April 12 – 19	Cancelled			
(Italy) Tour of the Alps	April 20 – 24	Cancelled			
(United Kingdom) Tour de Yorkshire	April 30 – May 3	Cancelled			
(France) Four Days of Dunkirk	May 5 – 10	Cancelled			
Tour of Norway	May 26 – 31	Cancelled			
(France) Boucles de la Mayenne	May 28 – 31	Cancelled			
(Netherlands) ZLM Tour	June 3 – 7	Cancelled			
Tour of Belgium	June 10 – 14	Cancelled			
Tour of Slovenia	June 24 – 28	Cancelled			
Tour of Austria	June 27 – July 3	Cancelled			
(China) Tour of Qinghai Lake	July 7 – 14	Cancelled			
(Spain) Vuelta a Burgos	July 28 – August 1	Remco Evenepoel (BEL)	Mikel Landa (ESP)	João Almeida (POR)	
(Belgium) VOO-Tour de Wallonie	August 16 – 19	Arnaud Démare (FRA)	Greg Van Avermaet (BEL)	Amaury Capiot (BEL)	
(United States) The Larry H. Miller Tour of Utah	August 3 – 9	Cancelled			
Arctic Race of Norway	August 6 – 9	Cancelled			
(Denmark) PostNord Danmark Rundt	August 12 – 16	Cancelled			
(Germany) Deutschland Tour	August 20 – 23	Cancelled			
(United Kingdom) Tour of Britain	September 6 – 13	Cancelled			
Tour de Luxembourg	September 15 – 19	Diego Ulissi (ITA)	Markus Hoelgaard (NOR)	Aimé De Gendt (BEL)	

== 1.Pro Category Races ==
Race	Date	Winner	Second	Third	Ref
(Spain) Clásica de Almería	February 16	Pascal Ackermann (GER)	Alexander Kristoff (NOR)	Elia Viviani (ITA)	
(Italy) Trofeo Laigueglia	February 16	Giulio Ciccone (ITA)	Biniam Girmay (ERI)	Diego Rosa (ITA)	
(France) Classic Sud-Ardèche	February 29	Rémi Cavagna (FRA)	Tanel Kangert (EST)	Guillaume Martin (FRA)	
(France) La Drôme Classic	March 1	Simon Clarke (AUS)	Warren Barguil (FRA)	Vincenzo Nibali (ITA)	
(Belgium) Kuurne–Brussels–Kuurne	March 1	Kasper Asgreen (DEN)	Giacomo Nizzolo (ITA)	Alexander Kristoff (NOR)	
(Italy) GP Industria & Artigianato	March 8	Cancelled			
(Belgium) Nokere Koerse	March 18	Cancelled			
(France) GP de Denain	March 19	Cancelled			
(Belgium) Bredene Koksijde Classic	March 20	Cancelled			
(Spain) GP Miguel Induráin	April 4	Cancelled			
(France) Tro-Bro Léon	April 19	Cancelled			
(France) Grand Prix de Plumelec-Morbihan	May 16	Cancelled			
(Italy) Gran Trittico Lombardo	August 3	Gorka Izagirre (ESP)	Alex Aranburu (ESP)	Greg van Avermaet (BEL)	
(Italy) Milano-Torino	August 5	Arnaud Démare (FRA)	Caleb Ewan (AUS)	Wout van Aert (BEL)	
(Italy) Gran Piemonte	August 12	George Bennett (NZL)	Diego Ulissi (ITA)	Mathieu Van der Poel (NED)	
(Belgium) Dwars door het Hageland	August 15	Jonas Rickaert (BEL)	Nils Eekhoff (NED)	Gianni Vermeersch (BEL)	
(Italy) Giro dell'Emilia	August 18	Aleksandr Vlasov (RUS)	João Almeida (POR)	Diego Ulissi (ITA)	
(Belgium) Brussels Cycling Classic	August 30	Tim Merlier (BEL)	Davide Ballerini (ITA)	Nacer Bouhanni (FRA)	
(United States) Maryland Cycling Classic	September 6	Cancelled			
(Belgium) (France) Tour de l'Eurométropole	September 12	Cancelled			
(France) GP de Fourmies	September 13	Cancelled			
(Belgium) Grand Prix de Wallonie	September 16	Cancelled			
(Italy) Coppa Sabatini	September 17	Dion Smith (NZL)	Andrea Pasqualon (ITA)	Alexandr Riabushenko (BLR)	
(Belgium) Primus Classic	September 19	Cancelled			
(Germany) Sparkassen Münsterland Giro	October 3	Cancelled			
(Italy) Coppa Bernocchi	October 5	Cancelled			
(Belgium) Brabantse Pijl	October 7 (Note: The Brabantse Pijl was scheduled for 15 April, but was postponed due to the COVID-19 pandemic in Belgium.)	Julian Alaphilippe (FRA)	Mathieu van der Poel (NED)	Benoît Cosnefroy (FRA)	
(France) Paris-Tours	October 11	Casper Pedersen (DEN)	Benoît Cosnefroy (FRA)	Joris Nieuwenhuis (NED)	
(Belgium) Scheldeprijs	October 14 (Note: The Scheldeprijs was scheduled for 8 April, but was postponed due to the COVID-19 pandemic in Belgium.)	Caleb Ewan (AUS)	Niccolò Bonifazio (ITA)	Bryan Coquard (FRA)	
Japan Cup	October 18	Cancelled			

== Championships ==
=== Continental Championships ===
Championships	Race	Date	Winner	Second	Third	Ref
African Championships; Mauritius	Cancelled					
Pan American Championships; Argentina	Cancelled					
Asian Championships; Malaysia	Cancelled					
European Championships; France	Road race	August 24–28	Giacomo Nizzolo (ITA)	Arnaud Démare (FRA)	Pascal Ackermann (GER)	
European Championships; France	Individual time trial	August 24–28	Stefan Küng (SUI)	Rémi Cavagna (FRA)	Victor Campenaerts (BEL)	
European Championships; France	Mixed team relay	August 24–28	Germany	Switzerland	Italy	
Oceanian Championships; Tasmania	Cancelled					

== UCI Teams ==
=== UCI WorldTeams ===
The UCI has granted a UCI WorldTour licence to the following nineteen teams:

- (Australia) Mitchelton–Scott
- Bahrain–McLaren
- (Belgium) Lotto–Soudal
- (Belgium) Deceuninck–Quick-Step
- (France) AG2R La Mondiale
- (France) Cofidis
- (France) Groupama–FDJ
- (Germany) Bora–Hansgrohe
- (Germany) Team Sunweb
- (United Kingdom) Ineos Grenadiers
- Israel Start-Up Nation
- (Kazakhstan) Astana
- (Netherlands) Team Jumbo–Visma
- (Poland) CCC Team
- (South Africa) NTT Pro Cycling
- (Spain) Movistar Team
- (United Arab Emirates) UAE Team Emirates
- (United States) EF Pro Cycling
- (United States) Trek–Segafredo

== Deaths ==
July

- July 17 - Marian Więckowski, 86, Polish racing cyclist.
- July 14 - Luis Orán Castañeda, 41, Colombian racing cyclist (2000 Giro d'Italia), work accident.
- July 2 - Niels De Vriendt, 20, Belgian racing cyclist, heart attack.

June

- June 17 - Fabrice Philipot, 54, French racing cyclist.
- June 17 - Ronny Van Sweevelt, 57, Belgian Olympic racing cyclist (1984), food poisoning.
- June 17 - Pietro Zoppas, 86, Italian racing cyclist.
- June 16 - Eusebio Vélez, 85, Spanish racing cyclist.

May

- May 30 - Roger Decock, 93, Belgian racing cyclist, Tour of Flanders winner (1952).
- May 29 - Henk Steevens, 88, Dutch racing cyclist (1953 Tour de France), cancer.
- May 28 - Gustaaf De Smet, 85, Belgian Olympic cyclist (1956).

April

- April 7 - Domingo Villanueva, 55, Filipino Olympic cyclist (1988, 1992).

March

- March 26 - Roger Baens, 86, Belgian racing cyclist.
- March 26 - Daniel Yuste, 75, Spanish Olympic racing cyclist (1968), COVID-19.
- March 25 - Danilo Barozzi, 92, Italian racing cyclist, complications from a broken femur.
- March 19 - Edi Ziegler, 90, German road racing cyclist, Olympic bronze medallist (1952).
- March 17 - Tadashi Kato, 85, Japanese Olympic cyclist (1952).
- March 9 - Italo De Zan, 94, Italian racing cyclist, COVID-19.
- March 3 - Nicolas Portal, 40, French racing cyclist, sporting director of Team Sky (since 2013), heart attack.

February

- February 29 - Andrei Vedernikov, 60, Russian racing cyclist, world champion (1981).
- February 15 - Wilfried Thaler, 85, Austrian cyclist.
- February 4 - Eugen Pleško, 71, Croatian Olympic cyclist (1972).

January

- January 30 - Nello Fabbri, 85, Italian racing cyclist.
- January 30 - Miguel Arroyo, 53, Mexican road racing cyclist, National champion (2000), complications during surgery.
- January 13 - Maurice Moucheraud, 86, French racing cyclist, Olympic champion (1956).
- January 10 - Guido Messina, 89, Italian road and track cyclist, Olympic (1952) and world champion (1948, 1953, 1954, 1955, 1956).
