= List of wins by BMC Racing Team and its successors =

This is a comprehensive list of victories of the CCC Pro Team cycling team. The races are categorized according to the UCI Continental Circuits rules. The team was a Continental team in 2007 a Professional Continental team from 2008 to 2010. In 2011 The team stepped up to the world tour until 2020 when it was folded. The team has ridden under the following names: BMC Racing Team and CCC Team.

== 2007 – BMC Racing Team ==
Stage 2b (TTT) Giro del Friuli-Venezia-Giulia

== 2008 – BMC Racing Team ==
Tour de Leelanau, Taylor Tolleson
Stage 3 Rochester Omnium, Antonio Cruz
Overall Tour of Utah, Jeff Louder

== 2009 – BMC Racing Team ==
Stage 1 Tour de Beauce, Danilo Wyss
Overall Grand Prix Tell, Mathias Frank

Stage 4, Thomas Frei

== 2010 – BMC Racing Team ==
La Flèche Wallonne, Cadel Evans
Points classification, Giro d'Italia, Cadel Evans
Stage 7 Giro d'Italia, Cadel Evans
Stage 5 & 7 Tour de Suisse, Marcus Burghardt

== 2011 – BMC Racing Team ==
Overall Tirreno–Adriatico, Cadel Evans

Stage 6, Cadel Evans

Overall Tour de Romandie, Cadel Evans
Norway Road Race Championships, Alexander Kristoff
Switzerland Time Trial Championships, Martin Kohler
Overall Tour de France, Cadel Evans

Stage 4, Cadel Evans

Stage 6 Österreich-Rundfahrt, Greg Van Avermaet
Overall Tour de Wallonie, Greg Van Avermaet

Stage 5, Greg Van Avermaet

Prologue Eneco Tour, Taylor Phinney
Stage 2 USA Pro Cycling Challenge, George Hincapie
Paris–Tours, Greg Van Avermaet

== 2012 – BMC Racing Team ==
Switzerland Road Race Championships, Martin Kohler
Overall Critérium International, Cadel Evans

Stage 2 (ITT), Cadel Evans

Stage 1 (TTT), Giro del Trentino
Giro di Toscana, Alessandro Ballan
Stage 1 (ITT) Giro d'Italia, Taylor Phinney
Stage 21 (ITT) Giro d'Italia, Marco Pinotti
Stage 1 Critérium du Dauphiné, Cadel Evans
Stage 7 (ITT) Tour of Austria, Marco Pinotti
Young rider classification in the Tour de France, Tejay van Garderen
Stage 1 Paris–Corrèze, Adam Blythe
Overall Tour of Utah, Johann Tschopp

Stage 5, Johann Tschopp

Stage 7 Eneco Tour, Alessandro Ballan
Stage 2 USA Pro Cycling Challenge, Tejay van Garderen
Stages 9 & 19 Vuelta a España, Philippe Gilbert
Stage 7 (ITT) USA Pro Cycling Challenge, Taylor Phinney
Stage 13 Vuelta a España, Steve Cummings
Binche–Tournai–Binche, Adam Blythe
Stage 5 Tour of Beijing, Steve Cummings
Road Race World Championships, Philippe Gilbert

== 2013 – BMC Racing Team ==
Stage 1 Tour of Qatar, Brent Bookwalter
Stage 2 (TTT) Tour of Qatar
Stage 1 Tour du Haut Var, Thor Hushovd
Stage 3 Giro del Trentino, Ivan Santaromita
Overall Tour of California, Tejay van Garderen

Stage 6 (ITT), Tejay van Garderen

Italy Road Race Championships, Ivan Santaromita
Italy Time Trial Championships, Marco Pinotti
Switzerland National Road Race Championships, Michael Schär
Norway National Road Race Championships, Thor Hushovd
Stage 3 Tour of Austria, Thor Hushovd
Stages 4 & 5 Tour of Austria, Mathias Frank
Overall Tour de Wallonie, Greg Van Avermaet

Stages 3 & 5, Greg Van Avermaet

Stages 3 & 5 Tour de Pologne, Thor Hushovd
Stage 4 Tour de Pologne, Taylor Phinney
Stage 1 Tour of Utah, Greg Van Avermaet
Overall Arctic Race of Norway, Thor Hushovd

Stages 2 & 4, Thor Hushovd

Overall USA Pro Cycling Challenge, Tejay van Garderen

Stage 2, Mathias Frank
Stage 5 (ITT), Tejay van Garderen

Stage 12 Vuelta a España, Philippe Gilbert
Stage 2 Tour of Alberta, Silvan Dillier
Stage 4 Tour of Alberta, Cadel Evans
Stage 1 Tour of Beijing, Thor Hushovd

== 2014 – BMC Racing Team ==
Stage 3 Tour Down Under, Cadel Evans
Overall Dubai Tour, Taylor Phinney

Stage 1 (ITT), Taylor Phinney

Overall Tour Méditerranéen, Steve Cummings

Stage 4 (ITT), Steve Cummings

Stage 2 Tour du Haut Var, Amaël Moinard
Stage 4 Volta a Catalunya, Tejay van Garderen
Brabantse Pijl, Philippe Gilbert
Amstel Gold Race, Philippe Gilbert
Overall Giro del Trentino, Cadel Evans

Stage 1, Team time trial
Stage 3, Cadel Evans

Stage 5 Tour of California, Taylor Phinney
United States National Time Trial Championships, Taylor Phinney
Overall Ster ZLM Toer, Philippe Gilbert

Prologue (ITT) & Stage 3, Philippe Gilbert

Slovakia National Time Trial Championships, Peter Velits
Stage 2 Tour of Utah, Michael Schär
Stages 6 & 7 Tour of Utah, Cadel Evans
Stage 5 Eneco Tour, Greg Van Avermaet
Overall USA Pro Cycling Challenge, Tejay van Garderen

Stages 3 & 6 (ITT), Tejay van Garderen

Grand Prix de Wallonie, Greg Van Avermaet
Primus Classic Impanis - Van Petegem, Greg Van Avermaet
Team Time Trial World Championships
Overall Tour of Beijing, Philippe Gilbert

Stage 2, Philippe Gilbert

== 2015 – BMC Racing Team ==
Overall Tour Down Under, Rohan Dennis

Stage 3, Rohan Dennis

Stage 3 Tirreno–Adriatico, Greg Van Avermaet
Stage 4 Volta a Catalunya, Tejay van Garderen
Volta Limburg Classic, Stefan Küng
Brabantse Pijl, Ben Hermans
Stage 4 Tour de Romandie, Stefan Küng
Stage 3 Tour de Yorkshire, Ben Hermans
Stages 12 & 18 Giro d'Italia, Philippe Gilbert
Overall Tour of Belgium, Greg Van Avermaet

Stage 4, Greg Van Avermaet

Switzerland National Time Trial Championships, Silvan Dillier
Switzerland National Road Race Championships, Danilo Wyss
Stage 3 Critérium du Dauphiné, team time trial
Stage 3 Tour of Austria, Rick Zabel
Stage 1 (ITT) Tour de France, Rohan Dennis
Stage 9 Tour de France, team time trial
Stage 13 Tour de France, Greg Van Avermaet
Grand Prix Pino Cerami, Philippe Gilbert
Stage 3 Tour de Wallonie, Philippe Gilbert
RideLondon–Surrey Classic, Jempy Drucker
Stage 3 Arctic Race of Norway, Ben Hermans
Stage 7 Eneco Tour, Manuel Quinziato
Stage 4 Arctic Race of Norway, Silvan Dillier
Stage 1 Vuelta a España, team time trial
Overall USA Pro Cycling Challenge, Rohan Dennis

Stage 1, Taylor Phinney
Stage 2, Brent Bookwalter
Stages 4 & 5 (ITT), Rohan Dennis
Team classification

Team Time Trial World Championships

== 2016 – BMC Racing Team ==
Australia National Time Trial Championships, Rohan Dennis
Stage 5 Tour Down Under, Richie Porte
Stage 4 (ITT) Vuelta a Andalucía, Tejay van Garderen
Vuelta a Murcia, Philippe Gilbert
Omloop Het Nieuwsblad, Greg Van Avermaet
Prologue (ITT) Driedaagse van West-Vlaanderen, Tom Bohli
Overall Tirreno–Adriatico, Greg Van Avermaet

Stage 1 (TTT)
Stage 6, Greg Van Avermaet

Stage 4 Tour of the Basque Country, Samuel Sánchez
Stage 6 (ITT) Tour of California, Rohan Dennis
United States National Time Trial Championships, Taylor Phinney
Prologue Tour de Luxembourg, Jean-Pierre Drucker
Stage 2 Tour de Luxembourg, Philippe Gilbert
Stage 5 Tour de Suisse, Darwin Atapuma
Stage 7 Tour de Suisse, Tejay van Garderen
Italy National Time Trial Championships, Manuel Quinziato
Belgium National Road Race Championships, Philippe Gilbert
Stage 5 Tour de France, Greg Van Avermaet
Olympics Men's Road Race, Greg Van Avermaet
Overall Tour du Limousin, Joey Rosskopf

Stage 1, Joey Rosskopf

Team classification Vuelta a España

Stage 16, Jempy Drucker

Grand Prix Cycliste de Montréal, Greg Van Avermaet
Stage 2 (ITT) Eneco Tour, Rohan Dennis
Stage 5 (TTT) Eneco Tour

== 2017 – BMC Racing Team ==
Australia National Time Trial Championships, Rohan Dennis
Australia National Road Race Championships, Miles Scotson
Overall Tour Down Under, Richie Porte

Stages 2 & 5, Richie Porte

Stage 5 (TTT) Volta a la Comunitat Valenciana
Overall Tour of Oman, Ben Hermans

Stages 2 & 5 Tour of Oman, Ben Hermans

Overall Tour La Provence, Rohan Dennis
Omloop Het Nieuwsblad, Greg Van Avermaet
Stage 1 (TTT) Tirreno–Adriatico
Stage 7 Paris–Nice, Richie Porte
Stage 7 (ITT) Tirreno–Adriatico, Rohan Dennis
Stage 2 (TTT) Volta a Catalunya
E3 Harelbeke, Greg Van Avermaet
Gent–Wevelgem, Greg Van Avermaet
Paris–Roubaix, Greg Van Avermaet
Stage 2 Tour of the Alps, Rohan Dennis
Overall Tour de Romandie, Richie Porte

Stage 2, Stefan Küng

Stage 6 Giro d'Italia, Silvan Dillier
Stage 18 Giro d'Italia, Tejay van Garderen
Overall Tour de Luxembourg, Greg Van Avermaet

Stage 1, Jempy Drucker
Stages 2 & 4, Greg Van Avermaet

Stage 4 (ITT) Critérium du Dauphiné, Richie Porte
Stages 1 (ITT) & 9 (ITT) Tour de Suisse, Rohan Dennis
Overall Route du Sud, Silvan Dillier
Luxembourg National Time Trial Championships, Jempy Drucker
Switzerland National Time Trial Championships, Stefan Küng
United States National Time Trial Championships, Joey Rosskopf
Switzerland National Road Race Championships, Silvan Dillier
Overall Tour de Wallonie, Dylan Teuns

Stage 3 & 5, Dylan Teuns
Stage 4, Jempy Drucker

Overall Tour de Pologne, Dylan Teuns

Stage 3, Dylan Teuns

Stage 2 Tour of Utah, Brent Bookwalter
Stage 2 (ITT) BinckBank Tour, Stefan Küng
Overall Arctic Race of Norway, Dylan Teuns

Stages 1 & 4, Dylan Teuns

Overall Colorado Classic, Manuel Senni

== 2018 – BMC Racing Team ==
Australia National Time Trial Championships, Rohan Dennis
Stage 5 Tour Down Under, Richie Porte
Stage 3 (TTT) Volta a la Comunitat Valenciana
Stage 5 Volta a la Comunitat Valenciana, Jürgen Roelandts
Stage 3 Tour of Oman, Greg Van Avermaet
Stage 4 (ITT) Abu Dhabi Tour, Rohan Dennis
Stage 1 (TTT) Tirreno–Adriatico
Stage 7 (ITT) Tirreno–Adriatico, Rohan Dennis
Overall Tour de Yorkshire, Greg Van Avermaet
Stage 4 (ITT) Tour of California, Tejay van Garderen
Stage 16 (ITT) Giro d'Italia, Rohan Dennis
Overall Tour de Suisse, Richie Porte

Stage 1 (TTT)
Stage 9 (ITT), Stefan Küng

United States National Time Trial Championships, Joey Rosskopf
Switzerland National Time Trial Championships, Stefan Küng
Stage 3 (TTT) Tour de France
Prologue Tour of Utah, Tejay van Garderen
Stage 2 (ITT) Binck Bank Tour, Stefan Küng
Stage 1 (ITT) & 16 (ITT) Vuelta a España, Rohan Dennis
Stage 11 Vuelta a España, Alessandro De Marchi
Time Trial, UCI Road World Championships, Rohan Dennis
Giro dell'Emilia, Alessandro De Marchi

== 2019 – CCC Team ==
New Zealand National Time Trial Championships, Patrick Bevin
Stage 2 Tour Down Under, Patrick Bevin
Stage 3 Volta a la Comunitat Valenciana, Greg Van Avermaet
Stage 4 Tour de Yorkshire, Greg Van Avermaet
Stage 3 (TTT) Hammer Stavanger
Grand Prix Cycliste de Montréal, Greg Van Avermaet

== 2020 – CCC Team ==
Poland National Time Trial Championships, Kamil Gradek
Czech Republic National Time Trial Championships, Josef Černý
Stage 3b (ITT) Tour Poitou-Charentes en Nouvelle-Aquitaine, Josef Černý
Overall Tour de Hongrie, Attila Valter

Stages 2, 3 & 4, Jakub Mareczko
Stage 5, Attila Valter

Stage 18 Giro d'Italia, Josef Černý

== Supplementary statistics ==
World Team Time Trial performance
World TTT Championships	2008	2009	2010	2011	2012	2013	2014	2015	2016	2017	2018	2019	2020
Position	Did not Exist				2	4	1	1	2	2	3	N/A	
Margin	Did not Exist				+ 03"	+ 1' 03"	–	–	+ 12"	+ 09"	+ 20"	N/A	
Grand Tours by highest finishing position
Race	2008	2009	2010	2011	2012	2013	2014	2015	2016	2017	2018	2019	2020
Giro d'Italia	–	–	5	15	14	3	8	8	9	20	16	21	22
Tour de France	–	–	23	1	5	35	5	12	5	11	20	36	48
Vuelta a España	–	–	–	82	35	14	6	56	14	10	33	60	21
Major week-long stage races by highest finishing position
Race	2008	2009	2010	2011	2012	2013	2014	2015	2016	2017	2018	2019	2020
Tour Down Under	–	–	6	11	15	17	2	1	2	1	2	41	3
Paris–Nice	–	–	–	67	5	4	9	16	3	11	6	27	–
Tirreno–Adriatico	–	–	3	1	30	22	16	14	1	2	2	16	15
Volta a Catalunya	–	–	–	7	22	12	3	7	4	5	17	31	NH
Tour of the Basque Country	–	–	–	23	22	30	6	11	6	35	11	31	NH
Giro del Trentino	–	–	47	5	9	8	1	–	–	11	–	–	NH
Tour de Romandie	26	12	31	1	27	24	18	18	10	1	3	16	NH
Critérium du Dauphiné	–	–	–	2	3	20	13	2	4	2	5	25	19
Tour de Suisse	16	–	4	6	12	5	6	17	36	2	1	35	NH
Tour de Pologne	–	–	5	26	18	13	9	3	15	1	5	19	6
Eneco Tour	–	–	–	4	16	25	5	2	4	4	6	4	38
Monument races by highest finishing position
Race	2008	2009	2010	2011	2012	2013	2014	2015	2016	2017	2018	2019	2020
Milan–San Remo	–	–	22	4	8	7	13	19	5	21	5	42	8
Tour of Flanders	–	–	6	6	3	7	2	3	16	2	5	10	42
Paris–Roubaix	–	68	29	6	3	4	17	3	19	1	4	12	NH
Liège–Bastogne–Liège	–	–	4	7	16	7	8	29	4	11	20	41	30
Giro di Lombardia	–	–	8	12	4	9	5	28	9	12	3	47	11
Classics by highest finishing position
Classic	2008	2009	2010	2011	2012	2013	2014	2015	2016	2017	2018	2019	2020
Omloop Het Nieuwsblad	–	–	18	8	5	5	2	6	1	1	22	2	4
Kuurne–Brussels–Kuurne	–	–	DNF	38	16	—	24	6	17	7	6	29	26
Strade Bianche	–	–	23	2	4	6	7	2	6	2	16	6	8
E3 Harelbeke	–	–	30	–	9	3	10	10	9	1	3	3	NH
Gent–Wevelgem	–	–	4	13	22	3	9	8	9	1	14	20	3
Amstel Gold Race	–	–	9	24	6	5	1	5	9	12	14	7	NH
La Flèche Wallonne	–	–	1	15	3	15	10	13	6	3	30	21	10
Clásica de San Sebastián	—	—	—	2	6	17	8	2	5	8	4	2	NH
Paris–Tours	–	76	32	1	6	48	27	3	10	10	–	–	–
