= 2020 Deceuninck–Quick-Step season =

Deceuninck–Quick Step
- 2020 season
- UCI code: DQT
- Status: UCI ProTeam
- Manager: Patrick Lefevere
- Main sponsor(s): Quick-Step
- Based: Belgium
- Bicycles: Specialized
- Groupset: Shimano

Season victories
- One-day races: 8
- Stage race overall: 5
- Stage race stages: 21
- World Championships: 1
- National Championships: 4
- Most wins: Remco Evenepoel (12)
- Jersey

The 2020 bicycling season for Deceuninck–Quick-Step began in January at the Tour Down Under.

== 2020 roster ==
As of 19 August 2020.

Rider	Date of birth
Julian Alaphilippe (FRA)	11 June 1992 (aged 27)
João Almeida (POR)	5 August 1998 (aged 21)
Shane Archbold (NZL)	2 February 1989 (aged 31)
Kasper Asgreen (DEN)	8 February 1995 (aged 25)
Andrea Bagioli (ITA)	23 March 1999 (aged 20)
Davide Ballerini (ITA)	21 September 1994 (aged 25)
Sam Bennett (IRL)	16 October 1990 (aged 29)
Mattia Cattaneo (ITA)	25 October 1990 (aged 29)
Rémi Cavagna (FRA)	10 August 1995 (aged 24)
Tim Declercq (BEL)	21 March 1989 (aged 30)
Dries Devenyns (BEL)	22 July 1983 (aged 36)
Remco Evenepoel (BEL)	25 January 2000 (aged 20)
Mikkel Frølich Honoré (DEN)	21 January 1997 (aged 23)
Ian Garrison (USA)	14 April 1998 (aged 21)
Álvaro Hodeg (COL)	16 September 1996 (aged 23)

Rider	Date of birth
Fabio Jakobsen (NED)	31 August 1996 (aged 23)
Bob Jungels (LUX)	22 September 1992 (aged 27)
Iljo Keisse (BEL)	21 December 1982 (aged 37)
James Knox (GBR)	4 November 1995 (aged 24)
Yves Lampaert (BEL)	10 April 1991 (aged 28)
Fausto Masnada (Note: After CCC Team were unable to secure a title sponsor for the 2021 season, they allowed Masnada to make a mid-season transfer to Deceuninck–Quick-Step on 19 August.) (ITA)	November 6, 1993 (aged 26)
Michael Mørkøv (DEN)	30 April 1985 (aged 34)
Florian Sénéchal (FRA)	10 July 1993 (aged 26)
Pieter Serry (BEL)	21 November 1988 (aged 31)
Stijn Steels (BEL)	21 August 1989 (aged 30)
Jannik Steimle (GER)	4 April 1996 (aged 23)
Zdeněk Štybar (CZE)	11 December 1985 (aged 34)
Bert Van Lerberghe (BEL)	29 September 1992 (aged 27)
Mauri Vansevenant (BEL)	1 June 1999 (aged 20)

Riders who joined the team for the 2020 season

Rider	2019 team
João Almeida	Hagens Berman Axeon
Shane Archbold	Bora–Hansgrohe
Andrea Bagioli	Team Colpack
Davide Ballerini	Astana
Sam Bennett	Bora–Hansgrohe
Mattia Cattaneo	Androni Giocattoli–Sidermec
Ian Garrison	Hagens Berman Axeon
Fausto Masnada	CCC Team
Stijn Steels	Roompot–Charles
Jannik Steimle	Team Vorarlberg Santic
Bert Van Lerberghe	Cofidis
Mauri Vansevenant	Neo pro (Note: Vansevenant joined the team on 1 July)

Riders who left the team during or after the 2019 season

Rider	2020 team
Eros Capecchi	Bahrain–McLaren
Philippe Gilbert	Lotto–Soudal
Davide Martinelli	Astana
Enric Mas	Movistar Team
Maximiliano Richeze	UAE Team Emirates
Fabio Sabatini	Cofidis
Petr Vakoč	Alpecin–Fenix
Elia Viviani	Cofidis

== Season victories ==
Date	Race	Competition	Rider	Country	Location
21 January	Santos Tour Down Under, Stage 1	UCI World Tour	Sam Bennett (IRL)	Australia	Tanunda
28 January	Vuelta a San Juan, Stage 3 (ITT)	UCI America Tour; UCI ProSeries	Remco Evenepoel (BEL)	Argentina	Punta Negra
30 January	Race Torquay	UCI Oceania Tour	Sam Bennett (IRL)	Australia	Torquay
1 February	Vuelta a San Juan, Stage 6	UCI America Tour; UCI ProSeries	Zdeněk Štybar (CZE)	Argentina	Autódromo El Villicúm
2 February	Cadel Evans Great Ocean Road Race	UCI World Tour	Dries Devenyns (BEL)	Australia	Geelong
2 February	Vuelta a San Juan, Overall	UCI America Tour; UCI ProSeries	Remco Evenepoel (BEL)	Argentina	
2 February	Vuelta a San Juan, Youth classification	UCI America Tour; UCI ProSeries	Remco Evenepoel (BEL)	Argentina	
9 February	Volta a la Comunitat Valenciana, Stage 5	UCI Europe Tour	Fabio Jakobsen (NED)	Spain	Valencia
19 February	Volta ao Algarve, Stage 1	UCI Europe Tour; UCI ProSeries	Fabio Jakobsen (NED)	Portugal	Lagos
20 February	Volta ao Algarve, Stage 2	UCI Europe Tour; UCI ProSeries	Remco Evenepoel (BEL)	Portugal	Fóia
23 February	Volta ao Algarve, Stage 5 (ITT)	UCI Europe Tour; UCI ProSeries	Remco Evenepoel (BEL)	Portugal	Lagoa
23 February	Volta ao Algarve, Overall	UCI Europe Tour; UCI ProSeries	Remco Evenepoel (BEL)	Portugal	Lagoa
23 February	Volta ao Algarve, Youth classification	UCI Europe Tour; UCI ProSeries	Remco Evenepoel (BEL)	Portugal	
23 February	Volta ao Algarve, Points classification	UCI Europe Tour; UCI ProSeries	Fabio Jakobsen (NED)	Portugal	
29 February	Faun-Ardèche Classic	UCI Europe Tour; UCI ProSeries	Rémi Cavagna (FRA)	France	Guilherand-Granges
1 March	Kuurne–Brussels–Kuurne	UCI Europe Tour; UCI ProSeries	Kasper Asgreen (DEN)	Belgium	Kuurne
8 March	Grote Prijs Jean-Pierre Monseré	UCI Europe Tour	Fabio Jakobsen (NED)	Belgium	Roeselare
30 July	Vuelta a Burgos, Stage 3	UCI Europe Tour; UCI ProSeries	Remco Evenepoel (BEL)	Spain	Picón Blanco (Espinosa de los Monteros)
31 July	Vuelta a Burgos, Stage 4	UCI Europe Tour; UCI ProSeries	Sam Bennett (IRL)	Spain	Roa de Duero
1 August	Vuelta a Burgos, Overall	UCI Europe Tour; UCI ProSeries	Remco Evenepoel (BEL)	Spain	
1 August	Vuelta a Burgos, Young rider classification	UCI Europe Tour; UCI ProSeries	Remco Evenepoel (BEL)	Spain	
5 August	Tour de Pologne, Stage 1	UCI World Tour	Fabio Jakobsen (NED)	Poland	Katowice
7 August	Tour de l'Ain, Stage 1	UCI Europe Tour	Andrea Bagioli (ITA)	France	Ceyzériat
8 August	Tour de Pologne, Stage 4	UCI World Tour	Remco Evenepoel (BEL)	Poland	Bukowina Tatrzańska
9 August	Tour de l'Ain, Young rider classification	UCI Europe Tour	João Almeida (POR)	France	
9 August	Tour de Pologne, Stage 5	UCI World Tour	Davide Ballerini (ITA)	Poland	Kraków
9 August	Tour de Pologne, Overall	UCI World Tour	Remco Evenepoel (BEL)	Poland	
18 August	Tour de Wallonie, Stage 3	UCI Europe Tour; UCI ProSeries	Sam Bennett (IRL)	Belgium	Visé
29 August	Druivenkoers Overijse	UCI Europe Tour	Florian Sénéchal (FRA)	Belgium	Overijse
30 August	Tour de France, Stage 2	UCI World Tour	Julian Alaphilippe (FRA)	France	Nice
1 September	Settimana Internazionale di Coppi e Bartali, Stage 1b (TTT)	UCI Europe Tour	(Note: The winning riders were João Almeida, Andrea Bagioli, Mikkel Frølich Honoré, James Knox, Pieter Serry, and Mauri Vansevenant.)	Italy	Gatteo
2 September	Settimana Internazionale di Coppi e Bartali, Stage 2	UCI Europe Tour	Andrea Bagioli (ITA)	Italy	Sogliano al Rubicone
8 September	Tour de France, Stage 10	UCI World Tour	Sam Bennett (IRL)	France	Île de Ré
16 September	Okolo Slovenska, Stage 1b	UCI Europe Tour	Jannik Steimle (GER)	Slovakia	Žilina
19 September	Okolo Slovenska, Overall	UCI Europe Tour	Jannik Steimle (GER)	Slovakia	
19 September	Okolo Slovenska, Teams classification	UCI Europe Tour	(Note: The riders in the squad were Shane Archbold, Ian Garrison, Álvaro Hodeg, Yves Lampaert, Jannik Steimle, Pieter Serry, and Mauri Vansevenant.)	Slovakia	
20 September	Tour de France, Stage 21	UCI World Tour	Sam Bennett (IRL)	France	Paris
20 September	Tour de France, Points classification	UCI World Tour	Sam Bennett (IRL)	France	
7 October	Brabantse Pijl	UCI Europe Tour; UCI ProSeries	Julian Alaphilippe (FRA)	Belgium	Overijse
21 October	Three Days of Bruges–De Panne	UCI World Tour	Yves Lampaert (BEL)	Belgium	De Panne
23 October	Vuelta a España, Stage 4	UCI World Tour	Sam Bennett (IRL)	Spain	Ejea de los Caballeros
8 November	Vuelta a España, Super-combativity award	UCI World Tour	Rémi Cavagna (FRA)	Spain	

== National, Continental and World champions ==
Date	Discipline	Jersey	Rider	Country	Location
16 February	New Zealand National Road Race Champion		Shane Archbold (NZL)	New Zealand	Cambridge
20 August	Luxembourg National Time Trial Champion		Bob Jungels (LUX)	Luxembourg	Mamer
21 August	France National Time Trial Champion		Rémi Cavagna (FRA)	France	Grand-Champ
21 August	Denmark National Time Trial Champion		Kasper Asgreen (DEN)	Denmark	Middelfart
23 August	Denmark National Road Race Champion		Kasper Asgreen (DEN)	Denmark	Middelfart
27 September	World Road Race Champion		Julian Alaphilippe (FRA)	Italy	Imola
