= Stefan Küng =

Swiss cyclist (born 1993)

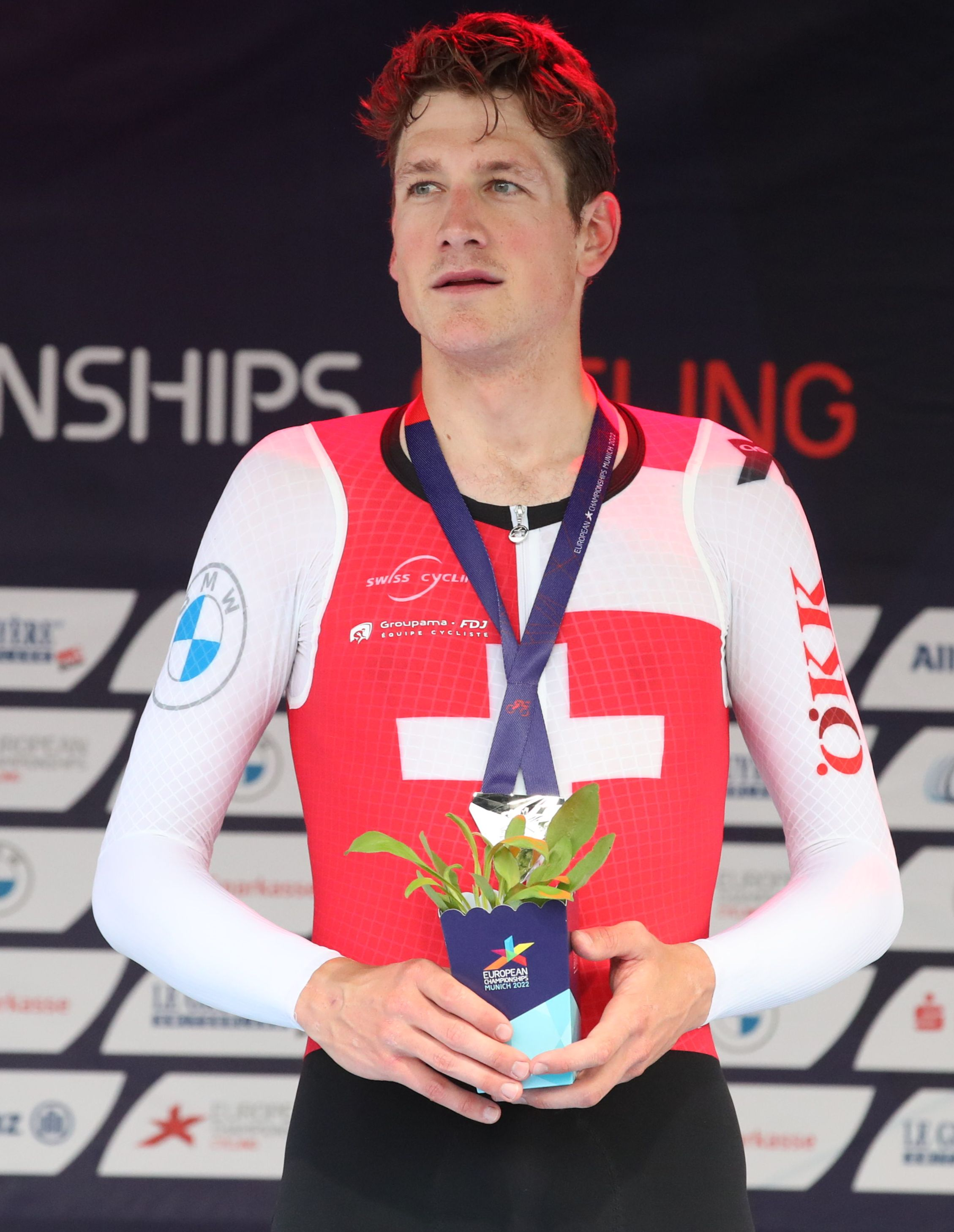
- Küng in 2022

Personal information
- Full name: Stefan Küng
- Nickname: King Küng
- Born: 16 November 1993 (age 32) Wil, St. Gallen, Switzerland
- Height: 1.93 m (6 ft 4 in)
- Weight: 83 kg (183 lb)

Cycling career
- Sport: Cycling
- Current team: Tudor Pro Cycling Team
- Disciplines: Road; Track
- Role: Rider
- Rider type: Time trialist (road); Classics specialist (road); Pursuitist (track)

Amateur team
- 2013–2014: BMC Development Team

Professional teams
- 2015–2018: BMC Racing Team
- 2019–2025: Groupama–FDJ
- 2026–: Tudor Pro Cycling Team

Major wins
- Road Grand Tours Tour de France 1 TTT stage (2018) Vuelta a España 2 individual stages (2024, 2026) Stage races Volta a la Comunitat Valenciana (2021) One-day races and Classics European Time Trial Championships (2020, 2021) National Time Trial Championships (2017–2021, 2024) National Road Race Championships (2020) Track World Championships Individual pursuit (2015)
Medal record
Representing Switzerland
Men's road bicycle racing
World Championships
Gold medal – first place	2022 Wollongong	Mixed team relay
Gold medal – first place	2023 Glasgow	Mixed team relay
Silver medal – second place	2022 Wollongong	Time trial
Bronze medal – third place	2014 Ponferrada	Under-23 time trial
Bronze medal – third place	2019 Harrogate	Road race
Bronze medal – third place	2020 Imola	Time trial
Bronze medal – third place	2025 Kigali	Mixed team relay
European Championships
Gold medal – first place	2020 Plouay	Time trial
Gold medal – first place	2021 Trentino	Time trial
Gold medal – first place	2014 Nyon	Under-23 road race
Silver medal – second place	2022 Munich	Time trial
Silver medal – second place	2024 Limburg	Time trial
Bronze medal – third place	2025 Guilherand-Granges	Mixed team relay
Men's track cycling
World Championships
Gold medal – first place	2015 Yvelines	Individual pursuit
Silver medal – second place	2014 Cali	Individual pursuit
Bronze medal – third place	2013 Minsk	Individual pursuit
European Championships
Gold medal – first place	2015 Grenchen	Individual pursuit
Silver medal – second place	2015 Grenchen	Team pursuit
Representing Liechtenstein
Men's road bicycle racing
Games of the Small States of Europe
Gold medal – first place	2013 Luxembourg	Time trial
Silver medal – second place	2011 Liechtenstein	Road race
Silver medal – second place	2011 Liechtenstein	Time trial
Representing BMC Racing Team
Men's road bicycle racing
World Championships
Gold medal – first place	2015 Richmond	Team time trial
Silver medal – second place	2016 Doha	Team time trial

Stefan Küng (born 16 November 1993) is a Swiss cyclist who currently rides for UCI ProTeam Tudor Pro Cycling Team. He is also a citizen of Liechtenstein.

== Career ==
Küng won the individual pursuit at the 2015 UCI Track Cycling World Championships, after beating Jack Bobridge in the final. Küng only took the lead in the final 250 metres (820 ft). In the 2015 Tour de Romandie, he grabbed the biggest victory of his career at that point in solo fashion. On a cold rainy day, he was part of the early breakaway and dropped his fellow escapees some 30 kilometres (19 mi) before the line, resisting to their return while riding toward victory in Fribourg. In June 2017, he was named in the startlist for the 2017 Tour de France.

Küng won his first individual Grand Tour stage at the 2024 Vuelta a España on the final stage of the race, beating out race leader Primož Roglič in the time trial by a comfortable 31 seconds.

== Major results ==
=== Road ===
2010
7th Overall Tour du Pays de Vaud
8th Time trial, UEC European Junior Championships
2011
National Junior Championships

1st Time trial
3rd Road race

1st Tour de Berne Juniors
Games of the Small States of Europe

2nd Road race
2nd Time trial

3rd Overall Driedaagse van Axel
3rd Overall Tour du Pays de Vaud

1st Stage 6

10th Overall Grand Prix Rüebliland
2013
National Under-23 Championships

1st Time trial
3rd Road race

Games of the Small States of Europe

1st Time trial
5th Road race

1st Giro del Belvedere
3rd Chrono Champenois
6th Time trial, UCI World Under-23 Championships
9th Tour de Berne
2014
UEC European Under-23 Championships

1st Road race
1st Time trial

1st Overall Tour de Normandie

1st Young rider classification
1st Prologue

1st Flèche Ardennaise
2nd Time trial, National Road Championships
3rd Time trial, UCI World Under-23 Championships
4th Chrono Champenois
8th Tour de Berne
10th Omloop Het Nieuwsblad U23
2015 (2 pro wins)
1st Team time trial, UCI World Championships
1st Volta Limburg Classic
1st Stage 4 Tour de Romandie
4th Overall Three Days of De Panne
2016
1st Stage 5 (TTT) Eneco Tour
2nd Team time trial, UCI World Championships
7th Overall Three Days of De Panne
9th Overall Ster ZLM Toer
2017 (3)
National Championships

1st Time trial
2nd Road race

Tour de Romandie

1st Points classification
1st Stage 2

1st Stage 2 (ITT) BinckBank Tour
1st Stage 1 (TTT) Tirreno–Adriatico
1st Stage 1 (TTT) Volta a la Comunitat Valenciana
2nd Team time trial, UCI World Championships
3rd Overall Tour of Britain
Tour de France

Held after Stages 1–2

2018 (3)
1st Time trial, National Championships
Tour de Suisse

1st Stages 1 (TTT) & 9 (ITT)

1st Stage 2 (ITT) BinckBank Tour
1st Stage 3 (TTT) Tour de France
1st Stage 1 (TTT) Tirreno–Adriatico
1st Stage 3 (TTT) Volta a la Comunitat Valenciana
3rd Team time trial, UCI World Championships
7th Time trial, UEC European Championships
10th E3 Harelbeke
2019 (5)
1st Time trial, National Championships
1st Tour du Doubs
1st Stage 2 Tour de Romandie
1st Stage 3 (ITT) Volta ao Algarve
UCI World Championships

3rd Road race
10th Time trial

3rd Overall Okolo Slovenska

1st Stage 1b (ITT)

4th Time trial, UEC European Championships
8th Overall BinckBank Tour
9th Binche–Chimay–Binche
2020 (3)
1st Time trial, UEC European Championships
National Championships

1st Time trial
1st Road race

3rd Time trial, UCI World Championships
3rd Overall BinckBank Tour
5th Gent–Wevelgem
8th Three Days of Bruges–De Panne
9th Omloop Het Nieuwsblad
Tour de France

Combativity award Stages 10 & 14

2021 (6)
1st Time trial, UEC European Championships
1st Time trial, National Championships
1st Overall Volta a la Comunitat Valenciana

1st Stage 4 (ITT)

1st Chrono des Nations
1st Stage 1 (ITT) Tour de Suisse
4th Time trial, Olympic Games
5th Time trial, UCI World Championships
5th Overall Benelux Tour
6th Gent–Wevelgem
2022 (3)
UCI World Championships

1st Team relay
2nd Time trial

1st Overall Tour Poitou-Charentes en Nouvelle-Aquitaine

1st Stage 3b (ITT)

1st Chrono des Nations
2nd Time trial, UEC European Championships
3rd Paris–Roubaix
3rd E3 Saxo Bank Classic
5th Overall Tour de Suisse
5th Tour of Flanders
6th Dwars door Vlaanderen
7th Overall Volta ao Algarve
7th Tour du Doubs
8th Amstel Gold Race
2023 (2)
UCI World Championships

1st Team relay
5th Road race

1st Stage 1 (ITT) Tour de Suisse
2nd Overall Okolo Slovenska
4th Bretagne Classic
5th Road race, National Championships
5th Overall Volta ao Algarve

1st Stage 5 (ITT)

5th Paris–Roubaix
6th Tour of Flanders
6th E3 Saxo Classic
2024 (3)
1st Time trial, National Championships
1st Chrono des Nations
Vuelta a España

1st Stage 21 (ITT)
Held after Stage 2

2nd Time trial, UEC European Championships
3rd Dwars door Vlaanderen
5th Paris–Roubaix
Olympic Games

7th Road race
8th Time trial

8th Time trial, UCI World Championships
9th Overall Volta ao Algarve
2025
UCI World Championships

3rd Team relay
10th Time trial

3rd Chrono des Nations
6th E3 Saxo Classic
7th Tour of Flanders
8th Time trial, UEC European Championships
9th Dwars door Vlaanderen
2026 (2)
1st Stage 18 (ITT) Vuelta a España
1st Stage 7 (ITT) Tour de Pologne
UCI World Championships

3rd Team relay
7th Time trial

5th Time trial, UEC European Championships

==== Grand Tour general classification results timeline ====
Grand Tour	2015	2016	2017	2018	2019	2020	2021	2022	2023	2024	2025
Giro d'Italia	DNF	60	—	—	—	—	—	—	DNF	—	—
Tour de France	—	—	79	53	96	DNF	49	33	54	DNF	—
Vuelta a España	—	—	—	—	—	—	—	—	—	39	76

==== Classics results timeline ====
Monument	2015	2016	2017	2018	2019	2020	2021	2022	2023	2024	2025
Milan–San Remo	—	—	—	—	59	52	—	—	—	23	—
Tour of Flanders	—	60	41	55	44	102	44	5	6	41	7
Paris–Roubaix	63	41	DNF	DNF	11	NH	DNF	3	5	5	43
Liège–Bastogne–Liège	Has not contested during his career										
Giro di Lombardia	Has not contested during his career										
Classic	2015	2016	2017	2018	2019	2020	2021	2022	2023	2024	2025
Omloop Het Nieuwsblad	—	—	61	22	18	9	38	12	25	16	32
Kuurne–Brussels–Kuurne	—	—	15	—	21	35	20	47	—	—	—
Strade Bianche	—	—	15	16	15	14	31	—	—	—	—
E3 Saxo Bank Classic	—	31	—	10	56	—	20	3	6	16	6
Gent–Wevelgem	—	—	82	64	16	5	6	36	52	14	—
Dwars door Vlaanderen	43	24	17	75	42	NH	63	6	23	3	9
Amstel Gold Race	—	—	—	—	—	NH	—	8	—	29	—
Bretagne Classic	DNF	—	—	—	—	—	—	70	4	—	—
Paris–Tours	—	—	55	—	13	—	31	31	—	—	

Legend
—	Did not compete
DNF	Did not finish
IP	In progress

=== Track ===
2011
1st Madison, UEC European Junior Championships (with Théry Schir)
National Junior Championships

1st Omnium
2nd Madison (with Loïc Perizzolo)

2013
UEC European Under-23 Championships

1st Individual pursuit
1st Team pursuit
2nd Madison (with Théry Schir)

1st Individual pursuit, National Championships
3rd Individual pursuit, UCI World Championships
2014
UEC European Under-23 Championships

1st Individual pursuit
1st Team pursuit

UCI World Championships

2nd Individual pursuit
3rd Madison (with Théry Schir)

2015
1st Individual pursuit, UCI World Championships
UEC European Championships

1st Individual pursuit
2nd Team pursuit

National Championships

1st Individual pursuit
1st Points race
1st Madison (with Théry Schir)
