= 2020 UCI World Tour =

Road cycling competitions

2020 UCI WorldTour
- Tenth edition of the UCI WorldTour

Details
- Dates: 21 January – 8 November
- Location: Australia; Europe; Middle East
- Races: 21

The 2020 UCI World Tour was a series of races that was scheduled to include thirty-six road cycling events throughout the 2020 cycling season. However, some of races were cancelled due to the COVID-19 pandemic. The tour started with the opening stage of the Tour Down Under on 21 January, and concluded with the final stage of the Vuelta a España on 8 November.

== Events ==
The 2020 calendar was initially announced in June 2019. In October 2019, the calendar was officially presented by the UCI.

There were two races fewer in the original schedule than in the 2019 UCI World Tour:

- The Presidential Cycling Tour of Turkey was downgraded to the UCI ProSeries for 2020 due to lack of participation of UCI World Tour teams in 2018 and 2019.
- The Tour of California was not held in 2020 after being placed on hiatus.

Due to the COVID-19 pandemic that commenced in the spring, numerous races were postponed, including all three Grand Tours and four of the five annual 'monuments'. As a result, race organisers requested new date allocations with the Union Cycliste Internationale (UCI) for many of these events. On 5 May 2020, a revised calendar was announced by the UCI, with 25 races to be held between 1 August and 8 November; several races are scheduled to overlap, including the Giro d'Italia, the Vuelta a España and Paris–Roubaix. Of the 25, Eschborn–Frankfurt and the EuroEyes Cyclassics had dates still to be confirmed at the time of the calendar's publication. Further amendments were made to the calendar in June, with two more races being cancelled, several others moving dates and the EuroEyes Cyclassics was scheduled for October.

Races in the 2020 UCI World Tour
Race	Date	Winner	Second	Third
(Australia) Tour Down Under	21–26 January	Richie Porte (AUS)	Diego Ulissi (ITA)	Simon Geschke (GER)
(Australia) Great Ocean Road Race	2 February	Dries Devenyns (BEL)	Pavel Sivakov (RUS)	Daryl Impey (RSA)
(United Arab Emirates) UAE Tour	23–27 February (Note: The UAE Tour was scheduled to run until 29 February, but was abandoned following stage five after two support staff tested positive for COVID-19.)	Adam Yates (GBR)	Tadej Pogačar (SLO)	Alexey Lutsenko (KAZ)
(Belgium) Omloop Het Nieuwsblad	29 February	Jasper Stuyven (BEL)	Yves Lampaert (BEL)	Søren Kragh Andersen (DEN)
(France) Paris–Nice	8–14 March (Note: Paris–Nice was scheduled to run until 15 March, but the final stage was cancelled due to the COVID-19 pandemic in France.)	Maximilian Schachmann (GER)	Tiesj Benoot (BEL)	Sergio Higuita (COL)
(Italy) Strade Bianche	1 August (Note: Strade Bianche was scheduled for 7 March, but was postponed due to the COVID-19 pandemic in Italy.)	Wout van Aert (BEL)	Davide Formolo (ITA)	Maximilian Schachmann (GER)
(Poland) Tour de Pologne	5–9 August (Note: The Tour de Pologne was initially scheduled to run from 5–11 July.)	Remco Evenepoel (BEL)	Jakob Fuglsang (DEN)	Simon Yates (GBR)
(Italy) Milan–San Remo	8 August (Note: Milan–San Remo was scheduled for 21 March, but was postponed due to the COVID-19 pandemic in Italy.)	Wout van Aert (BEL)	Julian Alaphilippe (FRA)	Michael Matthews (AUS)
(France) Critérium du Dauphiné	12–16 August (Note: The Critérium du Dauphiné was scheduled to run from 31 May to 7 June, but was postponed due to the COVID-19 pandemic in France.)	Daniel Martínez (COL)	Thibaut Pinot (FRA)	Guillaume Martin (FRA)
(Italy) Il Lombardia	15 August (Note: Il Lombardia was initially scheduled for 10 October. The race was first rescheduled for 31 October with the May calendar update, and subsequently to 15 August with the June calendar update.)	Jakob Fuglsang (DEN)	George Bennett (NZL)	Aleksandr Vlasov (RUS)
Bretagne Classic Ouest–France	25 August (Note: The Bretagne Classic Ouest–France was initially scheduled for 23 August, but was moved after that date was designated for national road cycling championships events.)	Michael Matthews (AUS)	Luka Mezgec (SLO)	Florian Sénéchal (FRA)
Tour de France	29 August – 20 September (Note: The Tour de France was scheduled to run from 27 June to 19 July, but was postponed due to the COVID-19 pandemic in France.)	Tadej Pogačar (SLO)	Primož Roglič (SLO)	Richie Porte (AUS)
(Italy) Tirreno–Adriatico	7–14 September (Note: Tirreno–Adriatico was scheduled to run from 11–17 March, but was postponed due to the COVID-19 pandemic in Italy.)	Simon Yates (GBR)	Geraint Thomas (GBR)	Rafał Majka (POL)
(Belgium) (Note: The Dutch stages for the BinckBank Tour were cancelled due to a surge of cases attributed to the COVID-19 pandemic in the Netherlands.) BinckBank Tour	29 September – 3 October (Note: The BinckBank Tour was initially scheduled to run from 31 August to 6 September.)	Mathieu van der Poel (NED)	Søren Kragh Andersen (DEN)	Stefan Küng (SUI)
(Belgium) La Flèche Wallonne	30 September (Note: La Flèche Wallonne (22 April) and Liège–Bastogne–Liège (26 April) were rescheduled four days apart, after being postponed due to the COVID-19 pandemic in Belgium.)	Marc Hirschi (SUI)	Benoît Cosnefroy (FRA)	Michael Woods (CAN)
(Italy) Giro d'Italia	3–25 October (Note: The Giro d'Italia was scheduled to run from 9–31 May, but was postponed due to the COVID-19 pandemic in Italy.)	Tao Geoghegan Hart (GBR)	Jai Hindley (AUS)	Wilco Kelderman (NED)
(Belgium) Liège–Bastogne–Liège	4 October	Primož Roglič (SLO)	Marc Hirschi (SUI)	Tadej Pogačar (SLO)
(Belgium) Gent–Wevelgem	11 October (Note: Gent–Wevelgem (29 March), Dwars door Vlaanderen (1 April) and the Tour of Flanders (5 April) initially kept their race days upon rescheduling to October, after being postponed due to the COVID-19 pandemic in Belgium. Dwars door Vlaanderen was ultimately cancelled in June.)	Mads Pedersen (DEN)	Florian Sénéchal (FRA)	Matteo Trentin (ITA)
(Belgium) Tour of Flanders	18 October	Mathieu van der Poel (NED)	Wout van Aert (BEL)	Alexander Kristoff (NOR)
(Spain) Vuelta a España	20 October – 8 November (Note: The Vuelta a España was initially scheduled to run from 14 August to 6 September. The race's opening three stages, due to be held in the Netherlands, were cancelled; reducing the race to 18 stages.)	Primož Roglič (SLO)	Richard Carapaz (ECU)	Hugh Carthy (GBR)
(Belgium) Three Days of Bruges–De Panne	21 October (Note: The Three Days of Bruges–De Panne was scheduled for 25 March, but was postponed due to the COVID-19 pandemic in Belgium.)	Yves Lampaert (BEL)	Tim Declercq (BEL)	Tim Merlier (BEL)

=== Cancelled events ===
A total of fifteen events were not able to be rescheduled, or were definitively cancelled during the 2020 season. The centennial Volta a Catalunya (23–29 March), the Tour of the Basque Country (6–11 April), the Tour de Romandie (28 April to 3 May), the Tour de Suisse (7–14 June), and the Clásica de San Sebastián (25 July) were all cancelled prior to any updated calendars being released by the UCI. Following the May calendar update, the E3 BinckBank Classic (27 March), and the RideLondon–Surrey Classic (16 August) were both cancelled; in the June calendar update, Eschborn–Frankfurt (initially scheduled for 1 May), and Dwars door Vlaanderen (having been rescheduled for 14 October) were also cancelled. In July, the EuroEyes Cyclassics (initially scheduled for 16 August, and then rescheduled to 3 October), and the two Canadian races in Québec City and Montréal (scheduled for 11 and 13 September) were cancelled.

Following the recommencement of racing on 1 August, the season-ending Tour of Guangxi (initially scheduled for 15–20 October, and then rescheduled to 5–10 November) was cancelled on 10 August. On 30 September, the day after Dutch stages were removed from the BinckBank Tour, the Amstel Gold Race (initially scheduled for 19 April, and then rescheduled to 10 October), was cancelled following a surge of cases attributed to the COVID-19 pandemic in the Netherlands. On 9 October, Paris–Roubaix (initially scheduled for 12 April, and then rescheduled to 25 October) was cancelled after a rise in cases attributed to the COVID-19 pandemic in France.

== Teams ==
The nineteen WorldTeams were automatically invited to compete in events, with Total Direct Énergie (the best performing UCI ProTeam in 2019) also automatically invited to all events. Other teams were invited by the organisers of each race.

- AG2R La Mondiale
- Astana
- Bahrain–McLaren
- Bora–Hansgrohe
- CCC Team
- Cofidis
- Deceuninck–Quick-Step
- EF Pro Cycling
- Groupama–FDJ
- Ineos Grenadiers
- Israel Start-Up Nation
- Lotto–Soudal
- Mitchelton–Scott
- Movistar Team
- NTT Pro Cycling
- Team Jumbo–Visma
- Team Sunweb
- Trek–Segafredo
- UAE Team Emirates
