= 2014 UCI Track Cycling World Championships – Men's individual pursuit =

Men's individual pursuit at the 2014 UCI Track Cycling World Championships
- Venue: Velódromo Alcides Nieto Patiño
- Location: Cali, Colombia
- Dates: 27 February 2014
- Winning time: 4:22.582

Medalists
gold medal	Alex Edmondson	Australia
silver medal	Stefan Küng	Switzerland
bronze medal	Marc Ryan	New Zealand

The Men's individual pursuit at the 2014 UCI Track Cycling World Championships was held on 27 February 2014. Twenty cyclists participated in the contest. The two fastest riders advanced to the final and race for the gold medal, while the riders ranked third and fourth raced for the bronze medal.

== Results ==
=== Qualifying ===
The qualifying was started at 12:00.

Rank	Name	Nation	Time	Notes
1	Alex Edmondson	Australia	4:21.003	Q
2	Stefan Küng	Switzerland	4:21.203	Q
3	Marc Ryan	New Zealand	4:21.865	Q
4	Ryan Mullen	Ireland	4:22.419	Q
5	Marco Coledan	Italy	4:22.741	
6	Alexander Serov	Russia	4:22.879	
7	Alexander Evtushenko	Russia	4:22.966	
8	Shane Archbold	New Zealand	4:23.709	
9	Sebastián Mora	Spain	4:24.197	
10	David Muntaner	Spain	4:25.154	
11	Nils Schomber	Germany	4:26.244	
12	Martyn Irvine	Ireland	4:26.525	
13	Tom Bohli	Switzerland	4:27.182	
14	Leung Chun Wing	Hong Kong	4:27.624	
15	Owain Doull	Great Britain	4:28.193	
16	Aleh Ahiyevich	Belarus	4:28.398	
17	Volodymyr Dzhus	Ukraine	4:28.850	
18	Juan Sebastián Molano	Colombia	4:29.236	
19	Edibaldo Maldonado	Mexico	4:38.535	
20	Jonas Rickaert	Belgium	4:38.988	

=== Finals ===
The finals were started at 20:25.

Rank	Name	Nation	Time
Gold Medal Race
1st place, gold medalist(s)	Alex Edmondson	Australia	4:22.582
2nd place, silver medalist(s)	Stefan Küng	Switzerland	4:22.995
Bronze Medal Race
3rd place, bronze medalist(s)	Marc Ryan	New Zealand	4:22.895
4	Ryan Mullen	Ireland	4:24.626
