= 2022 Dwars door Vlaanderen =

Cycling race

2022 UCI World Tour, race 11 of 32
- Event poster with previous winners Annemiek van Vleuten and Dylan van Baarle

Race details
- Dates: 30 March 2022
- Stages: 1
- Distance: 184.7 km (114.8 mi)
- Winning time: 4h 05' 39"

Results
	Winner	Mathieu van der Poel (NED)	(Alpecin–Fenix)
	Second	Tiesj Benoot (BEL)	(Team Jumbo–Visma)
	Third	Tom Pidcock (GBR)	(Ineos Grenadiers)

The 2022 Dwars door Vlaanderen was a road cycling one-day race that took place on 30 March 2022 in Belgium. It was the 76th edition of Dwars door Vlaanderen and the 11th event of the 2022 UCI World Tour. It was won by Dutch rider Mathieu van der Poel of Alpecin–Fenix for the second time, having previously won the 2019 edition.

== Teams ==
All eighteen UCI WorldTeams and six UCI ProTeams participated in the race. Of the twenty-five teams, three - Cofidis (6), Arkéa–Samsic (6), and Israel–Premier Tech (5) - did not compete with the maximum allowed seven riders.

UCI WorldTeams

- AG2R Citroën Team
- Astana Qazaqstan Team
- Bora–Hansgrohe
- Cofidis
- Quick-Step Alpha Vinyl Team
- EF Education–EasyPost
- Groupama–FDJ
- Ineos Grenadiers
- Intermarché–Wanty–Gobert Matériaux
- Israel–Premier Tech
- Lotto–Soudal
- Movistar Team
- Team Bahrain Victorious
- Team BikeExchange–Jayco
- Team DSM
- Team Jumbo–Visma
- Trek–Segafredo
- UAE Team Emirates

UCI ProTeams

- Alpecin–Fenix
- B&B Hotels–KTM
- Bingoal Pauwels Sauces WB
- Sport Vlaanderen–Baloise
- Team TotalEnergies
- Uno-X Pro Cycling Team

== Results ==
Result
Rank	Rider	Team	Time
1	Mathieu van der Poel (NED)	Alpecin–Fenix	4h 05' 39"
2	Tiesj Benoot (BEL)	Team Jumbo–Visma	+ 1"
3	Tom Pidcock (GBR)	Ineos Grenadiers	+ 5"
4	Victor Campenaerts (BEL)	Lotto–Soudal	+ 5"
5	Nils Politt (GER)	Bora–Hansgrohe	+ 5"
6	Stefan Küng (SUI)	Groupama–FDJ	+ 5"
7	Kelland O'Brien (AUS)	Team BikeExchange–Jayco	+ 5"
8	Ben Turner (GBR)	Ineos Grenadiers	+ 12"
9	Jan Tratnik (SVN)	Team Bahrain Victorious	+ 2'08"
10	Tadej Pogačar (SVN)	UAE Team Emirates	+ 2'08"
