= 2020 Paris–Roubaix =

Cycling race

2020 UCI World Tour, race 22 of 22
- Official event poster

Race details
- Dates: 25 October 2020

The 2020 Paris–Roubaix was a one-day road cycling race scheduled to take place on 12 April 2020, but was postponed to 25 October 2020 due to the COVID-19 pandemic. However, on 9 October 2020, the race was cancelled due to an increase of coronavirus cases in France.

It would have been the 118th edition of Paris–Roubaix and the 23rd event of the 2020 UCI World Tour.

== Teams ==
All nineteen UCI WorldTeams were invited automatically and obliged to enter a team in the race. Six UCI Professional Continental teams had been invited.

UCI WorldTeams

- AG2R La Mondiale
- Astana
- Bahrain–McLaren
- Bora–Hansgrohe
- CCC Team
- Cofidis
- Deceuninck–Quick-Step
- EF Pro Cycling
- Groupama–FDJ
- Israel Start-Up Nation
- Lotto–Soudal
- Mitchelton–Scott
- Movistar Team
- NTT Pro Cycling
- Ineos Grenadiers
- Team Jumbo–Visma
- Team Sunweb
- Trek–Segafredo
- UAE Team Emirates

UCI Professional Continental teams

- Alpecin–Fenix
- Arkéa–Samsic
- B&B Hotels–Vital Concept
- Circus–Wanty Gobert
- Nippo–Delko–One Provence
- Total Direct Énergie
