= 2015 Volta Limburg Classic =

Race details
- Dates: 4 April 2015
- Distance: 198 km (123.0 mi)
- Winning time: 5h 02' 30"

Results
	Winner	Stefan Küng (SUI)
	Second	Maciej Paterski (POL)
	Third	Dylan Teuns (BEL)

The 2015 Volta Limburg Classic was the 42nd edition of the Volta Limburg Classic cycle race and was held on 4 April 2015. The race started and finished in Eijsden. The race was won by Stefan Küng.

== Results ==
Rank	Rider	Team	Time
1	Stefan Küng (SUI)	BMC Racing Team	5h 02' 30"
2	Maciej Paterski (POL)	CCC–Sprandi–Polkowice	+ 27"
3	Dylan Teuns (BEL)	BMC Racing Team	+ 27"
4	Enrico Battaglin (ITA)	Bardiani–CSF	+ 27"
5	Rasmus Guldhammer (DEN)	Cult Energy Pro Cycling	+ 27"
6	Søren Kragh Andersen (DEN)	Team TreFor–Blue Water	+ 27"
7	Amaël Moinard (FRA)	BMC Racing Team	+ 29"
8	Wilco Kelderman (NED)	LottoNL–Jumbo	+ 31"
9	Damiano Cunego (ITA)	Nippo–Vini Fantini	+ 31"
10	Steven Kruijswijk (NED)	LottoNL–Jumbo	+ 35"
