= 2017 Dwars door Vlaanderen =

Cycling race

2017 UCI World Tour, race 10 of 37
- Event poster with previous winner Jens Debusschere

Race details
- Dates: 22 March 2017
- Stages: 1
- Distance: 203.4 km (126.4 mi)
- Winning time: 4h 47' 26"

Results
	Winner	Yves Lampaert (BEL)	(Quick-Step Floors)
	Second	Philippe Gilbert (BEL)	(Quick-Step Floors)
	Third	Alexey Lutsenko (KAZ)	(Astana})

The 2017 Dwars door Vlaanderen is a road cycling one-day race that took place on 22 March. It was the 72nd edition of the Dwars door Vlaanderen, and the first since it was promoted to World Tour level – as the tenth event of the 2017 UCI World Tour.

The race was won by local rider Yves Lampaert – riding for the Quick-Step Floors team – who soloed away to the victory after making the race-defining split along with teammate Philippe Gilbert, Alexey Lutsenko from the Astana team, and Orica–Scott's Luke Durbridge. Lampaert attacked with 7.5 kilometres (4.7 miles) remaining and ultimately won the race by 39 seconds ahead of Gilbert, who led home Lutsenko and Durbridge in a sprint for second place.

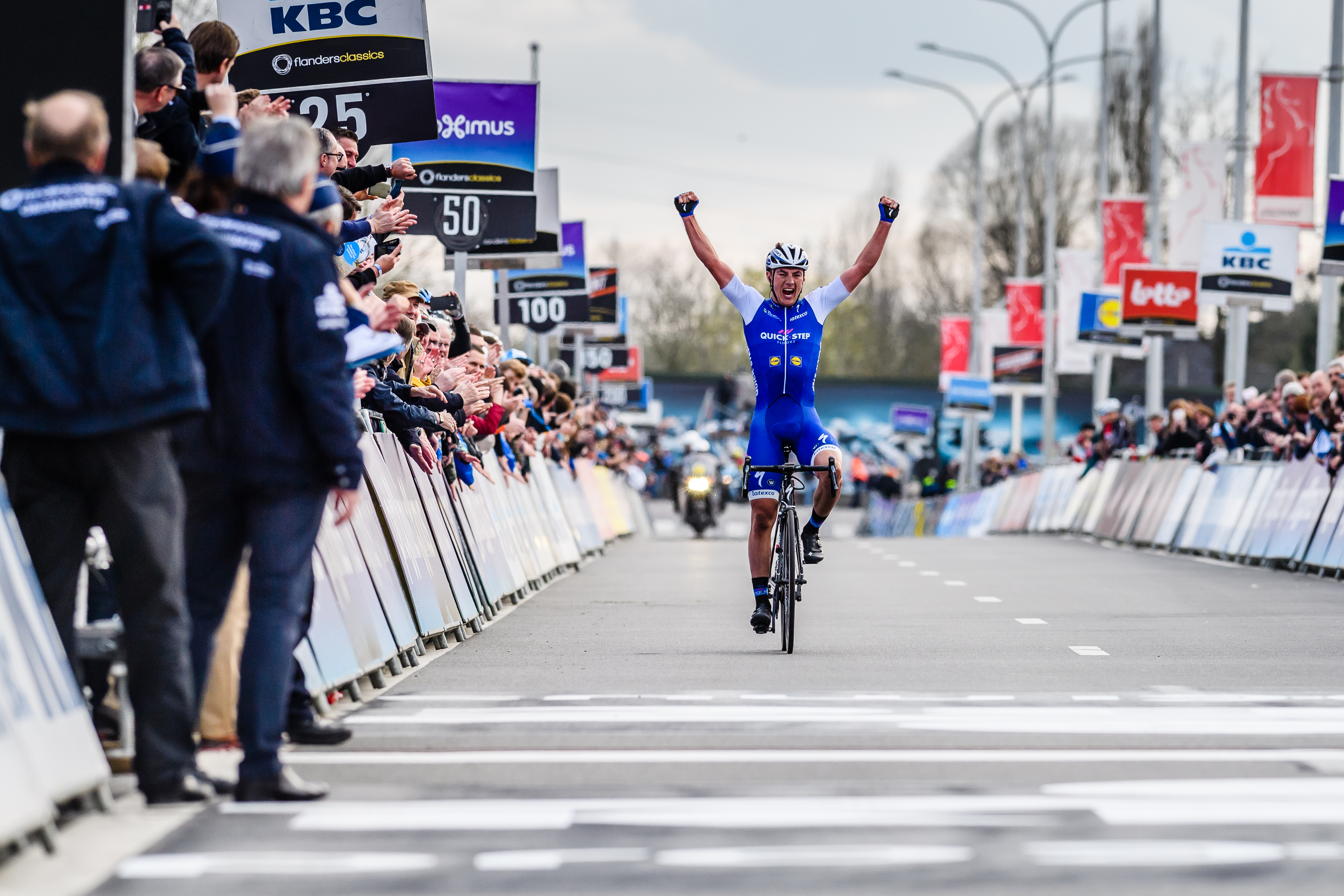
Lampaert finishing first in Waregem

== Teams ==
As a new event to the UCI World Tour, all UCI WorldTeams were invited to the race, but not obligated to compete in the race. As such, sixteen of the eighteen WorldTeams – all except Team Dimension Data and Team Sky – competed in the race. Nine UCI Professional Continental teams competed, completing the 25-team peloton.

UCI WorldTeams

- AG2R La Mondiale
- Astana
- Bahrain–Merida
- BMC Racing Team
- Bora–Hansgrohe
- Cannondale–Drapac
- FDJ
- Team Katusha–Alpecin
- LottoNL–Jumbo
- Lotto–Soudal
- Movistar Team
- Orica–Scott
- Quick-Step Floors
- Team Sunweb
- Trek–Segafredo
- UAE Team Emirates

UCI Professional Continental teams

- Cofidis
- Direct Énergie
- Gazprom–RusVelo
- Israel Cycling Academy
- Roompot–Nederlandse Loterij
- Sport Vlaanderen–Baloise
- Vérandas Willems–Crelan
- Wanty–Groupe Gobert
- WB Veranclassic Aqua Protect

== Route ==
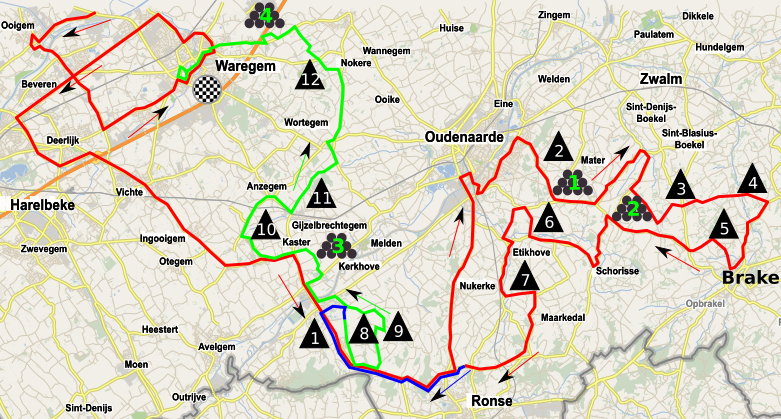
Route of the 2017 Dwars door Vlaanderen

The race started in Roeselare and followed a 203.4-kilometre (126.4 mi) course to finish in Waregem. It began with a long flat section that took the riders generally east from Roeselare and into Waregem; it then left the town and went south. At Avelgem, the course turned back east again to cross the first climb, the Nieuwe Kwaremont, after 92 kilometres (57 mi). This was followed by the climb of the Kattenberg, then the cobbled flat sectors of the Holleweg and the Haaghoek, then the climbs of the Leberg and the Berendries. After the next climb, the Valkenberg, the course turned back west towards the finish, with 70 kilometres (43 mi) remaining. The Eikenberg and the Taaienberg followed soon after, then the combination of the Oude Kwaremont and the Paterberg. After the final flat cobbled sector, the Varentstraat, the course turned north for the final three climbs: the Vossenhol (Tiegemberg), Holstraat and Nokereberg. From the summit of Nokereberg, there were around 10 kilometres (6.2 mi) to the finish in Waregem.

=== Categorised climbs and cobbles ===
Climbs and cobbled sections in the 2017 Dwars door Vlaanderen
No.	Name	Distance from		Surface	Length (metres)	Gradient (%)	
No.	Name	Start (km)	Finish (km)	Surface	Length (metres)	(ave.)	(max.)
1	Nieuwe Kwaremont	90.7	112.7	asphalt	2000	4.2%	8%
2	Kattenberg	110.1	93.3	asphalt	740	5.9%	8.2%
–	Holleweg	110.8	92.6	cobbles	1500	—	
–	Haaghoek	119.5	83.9	cobbles	1700	—	
3	Leberg	122.4	81.0	asphalt	700	6.1%	14%
4	Berendries	126.6	76.8	asphalt	900	7.2%	14%
5	Valkenberg	131.6	71.8	asphalt	540	8.1%	12.8%
6	Eikenberg	144.4	59.0	cobbles	1250	5.8%	10%
7	Taaienberg	150.1	53.3	cobbles	530	6.6%	15.8%
8	Oude Kwaremont	167.9	35.5	cobbles	1500	4%	11.6%
9	Paterberg	171.4	32.0	cobbles	365	12.9%	20.3%
–	Varentstraat	177.2	26.2	cobbles	2000	—	
10	Tiegemberg	182.1	21.3	asphalt	1400	6.5%	9%
11	Holstraat	186.5	16.9	asphalt	1000	5.2%	12%
12	Nokereberg	194.0	9.4	cobbles	500	5.7%	6.7%
–	Herlegemstraat	196.7	6.7	cobbles	800	—	

== Result ==
Result
Rank	Rider	Team	Time
1	Yves Lampaert (BEL)	Quick-Step Floors	4h 47' 26"
2	Philippe Gilbert (BEL)	Quick-Step Floors	+ 39"
3	Alexey Lutsenko (KAZ)	Astana	+ 39"
4	Luke Durbridge (AUS)	Orica–Scott	+ 39"
5	Dylan Groenewegen (NED)	LottoNL–Jumbo	+ 1' 03"
6	Oliver Naesen (BEL)	AG2R La Mondiale	+ 1' 03"
7	Tiesj Benoot (BEL)	Lotto–Soudal	+ 1' 03"
8	Dylan van Baarle (NED)	Cannondale–Drapac	+ 1' 03"
9	Mitchell Docker (AUS)	Orica–Scott	+ 1' 03"
10	Florian Sénéchal (FRA)	Cofidis	+ 1' 03"
