= 2014 Kuurne–Brussels–Kuurne =

Race details
- Dates: 2 March
- Stages: 1
- Distance: 197 km (122.4 mi)
- Winning time: 4h 28' 50"

Results
	Winner	Tom Boonen (BEL)	(Omega Pharma–Quick-Step)
	Second	Moreno Hofland (NED)	(Belkin Pro Cycling)
	Third	Sep Vanmarcke (BEL)	(Belkin Pro Cycling)

The 2014 Kuurne–Brussels–Kuurne took place on 2 March 2014. It was the 66th edition of the international classic Kuurne–Brussels–Kuurne and was won by Tom Boonen of Omega Pharma–Quick-Step in a sprint of a ten-man group.

== Results ==
	Cyclist	Team	Time
1	Tom Boonen (BEL)	Omega Pharma–Quick-Step	4h 28' 50"
2	Moreno Hofland (NED)	Belkin Pro Cycling	s.t.
3	Sep Vanmarcke (BEL)	Belkin Pro Cycling	s.t.
4	Yves Lampaert (BEL)	Topsport Vlaanderen–Baloise	s.t.
5	Stijn Vandenbergh (BEL)	Omega Pharma–Quick-Step	s.t.
6	Maarten Wynants (BEL)	Belkin Pro Cycling	s.t.
7	Guillaume Van Keirsbulck (BEL)	Omega Pharma–Quick-Step	+ 2"
8	Nikolas Maes (BEL)	Omega Pharma–Quick-Step	+ 2"
9	Matteo Trentin (ITA)	Omega Pharma–Quick-Step	+ 4"
10	Johan Vansummeren (BEL)	Garmin–Sharp	+ 4"
