= 2020 Cadel Evans Great Ocean Road Race =

Cycling race

2020 UCI World Tour, race 2 of 21

Race details
- Dates: 2 February 2020
- Distance: 171.1 km (106.3 mi)
- Winning time: 4h 05' 49"

Results
	Winner	Dries Devenyns (BEL)	(Deceuninck–Quick-Step)
	Second	Pavel Sivakov (RUS)	(Team INEOS)
	Third	Daryl Impey (RSA)	(Mitchelton–Scott)

The 2020 Cadel Evans Great Ocean Road Race was a road cycling race that was held on 2 February 2020 in Geelong, Australia. It was the sixth edition of the Cadel Evans Great Ocean Road Race and the second event of the 2020 UCI World Tour.

The race was won in a two-up sprint by Dries Devenyns of the Deceuninck–Quick-Step team, ahead of Team INEOS rider Pavel Sivakov, with Mitchelton–Scott's Daryl Impey finishing third for the third year in succession.

== Teams ==
Sixteen teams entered the race, which consisted of fifteen of the nineteen UCI WorldTeams, along with an Australian national team. Each team submitted seven riders, except for Bahrain–McLaren and CCC Team, which each entered six, and AG2R La Mondiale, which only entered five. Of the starting peloton of 108 riders, 95 finished.

UCI WorldTeams

- AG2R La Mondiale
- Bahrain–McLaren
- Bora–Hansgrohe
- CCC Team
- Cofidis
- Deceuninck–Quick-Step
- EF Pro Cycling
- Groupama–FDJ
- Israel Start-Up Nation
- Lotto–Soudal
- Mitchelton–Scott
- NTT Pro Cycling
- Team INEOS
- Team Sunweb
- Trek–Segafredo

National Teams

- Australia

== Result ==
Result
Rank	Rider	Team	Time
1	Dries Devenyns (BEL)	Deceuninck–Quick-Step	4h 05' 49"
2	Pavel Sivakov (RUS)	Team INEOS	+ 0"
3	Daryl Impey (RSA)	Mitchelton–Scott	+ 4"
4	Jens Keukeleire (BEL)	EF Pro Cycling	+ 4"
5	Dylan van Baarle (NED)	Team INEOS	+ 4"
6	Jay McCarthy (AUS)	Bora–Hansgrohe	+ 4"
7	Caleb Ewan (AUS)	Lotto–Soudal	+ 25"
8	Marco Haller (AUT)	Bahrain–McLaren	+ 25"
9	Elia Viviani (ITA)	Cofidis	+ 25"
10	Simon Yates (GBR)	Mitchelton–Scott	+ 25"
