= 2020 BinckBank Tour =

2020 UCI World Tour, race 14 of 21

Race details
- Dates: 29 September – 3 October 2020
- Stages: 4 (Note: Due to a surge in COVID-19 cases in the Netherlands, race organizers were forced to cancel stage 2, which took place entirely in the Netherlands.)
- Distance: 482.24 km (299.65 mi)
- Winning time: 10h 43' 08"

Results
Jersey awarded to the overall winner	Winner	Mathieu van der Poel (NED)	(Alpecin–Fenix)
	Second	Søren Kragh Andersen (DEN)	(Team Sunweb)
	Third	Stefan Küng (SUI)	(Groupama–FDJ)
Jersey awarded to the points classification winner	Points	Mads Pedersen (DEN)	(Trek–Segafredo)
Jersey awarded to the combativity classification winner	Combativity	Kenneth Van Rooy (BEL)	(Sport Vlaanderen–Baloise)
	Team	Alpecin–Fenix	

The 2020 BinckBank Tour was a road cycling stage race that was originally scheduled to take place between 31 August and 6 September 2020 in Belgium. However, because of the Tour de France being rescheduled to the time the event was to have taken place, the race was rescheduled to remove the conflict. It started on 29 September 2020 (nine days after Le Tour finished) and ended on 3 October 2020. It was the 16th edition of the BinckBank Tour and was part of the 2020 UCI World Tour.

== Teams ==
Twenty-four teams participated in the 2020 edition. All nineteen UCI WorldTeams were invited automatically and obliged to enter a team into the race. In addition, 5 wildcards were awarded to UCI ProTeams. Each team was allowed to enter up to seven riders; Astana, Groupama–FDJ, INEOS Grenadiers (with six each), and Movistar Team (with five) were the only teams not to do so. 94 of the 163 riders in the race finished.

UCI WorldTeams

- AG2R La Mondiale
- Astana
- Bahrain–McLaren
- Bora–Hansgrohe
- CCC Team
- Cofidis
- Deceuninck–Quick-Step
- EF Pro Cycling
- Groupama–FDJ
- Israel Start-Up Nation
- Lotto–Soudal
- Mitchelton–Scott
- Movistar Team
- NTT Pro Cycling
- INEOS Grenadiers
- Team Jumbo–Visma
- Team Sunweb
- Trek–Segafredo
- UAE Team Emirates

UCI ProTeams

- Alpecin–Fenix
- Bingoal–Wallonie Bruxelles
- Circus–Wanty Gobert
- Sport Vlaanderen–Baloise
- Total Direct Énergie

== Stage characteristics and winners ==
Stage characteristics and winners
Stage	Date	Route	Distance	Type	Winner
1	29 September	Blankenberge (Belgium) to Ardooie (Belgium)	132.1 km (82.1 mi)	Flat stage	Jasper Philipsen (BEL)
2	30 September	~~Vlissingen (Netherlands) to Vlissingen (Netherlands)~~	~~11.0 km (6.8 mi)~~	~~Individual time trial~~	Cancelled
3	1 October	~~Philippine (Netherlands)~~ Aalter (Belgium) to Aalter (Belgium)	~~165.7 km (103.0 mi)~~ 157 km (98 mi) (Note: Due to a surge in COVID-19 cases in the Netherlands, race organizers were forced to reroute stage 3, which would have started in Philippine (Netherlands). Stage 3 will start and finish in Aalter (Belgium), after seven local laps.)	Flat stage	Mads Pedersen (DEN)
4	2 October	Riemst (Belgium) to ~~Sittard-Geleen (Netherlands)~~ Riemst (Belgium)	~~195.4 km (121.4 mi)~~ 8.14 km (5.06 mi) (Note: Due to a surge in COVID-19 cases in the Netherlands, race organizers were forced to reroute stage 4, which would have finished in Sittard-Geleen (Netherlands). Instead, stage 4 was changed into an individual time trial to replace the cancelled stage 2 which will start and finish in Riemst (Belgium).)	~~Flat stage~~ Individual time trial	Søren Kragh Andersen (DEN)
5	3 October	Ottignies-Louvain-la-Neuve (Belgium) to Geraardsbergen (Belgium)	185.0 km (115.0 mi)	Hilly stage	Mathieu van der Poel (NED)
Total		~~689.2 km (428.2 mi)~~ 482.24 km (299.65 mi)			

== Stages ==
=== Stage 1 ===
29 September 2020 – Blankenberge to Ardooie, 132.1 km (82.1 mi)

Stage 1 Result
Rank	Rider	Team	Time
1	Jasper Philipsen (BEL)	UAE Team Emirates	2h 59' 26"
2	Mads Pedersen (DEN)	Trek–Segafredo	+ 0"
3	Pascal Ackermann (GER)	Bora–Hansgrohe	+ 0"
4	Danny van Poppel (NED)	Circus–Wanty Gobert	+ 0"
5	Stefan Bissegger (SUI)	EF Pro Cycling	+ 0"
6	Alberto Dainese (ITA)	Team Sunweb	+ 0"
7	Nils Eekhoff (NED)	Team Sunweb	+ 0"
8	Lorrenzo Manzin (FRA)	Total Direct Énergie	+ 0"
9	Mathieu van der Poel (NED)	Alpecin–Fenix	+ 0"
10	Tim Merlier (BEL)	Alpecin–Fenix	+ 0"

General classification after Stage 1
Rank	Rider	Team	Time
1	Jasper Philipsen (BEL)	UAE Team Emirates	2h 59' 16"
2	Mads Pedersen (DEN)	Trek–Segafredo	+ 4"
3	Mike Teunissen (NED)	Team Jumbo–Visma	+ 5"
4	Pascal Ackermann (GER)	Bora–Hansgrohe	+ 6"
5	Mathieu van der Poel (NED)	Alpecin–Fenix	+ 7"
6	Yves Lampaert (BEL)	Deceuninck–Quick-Step	+ 7"
7	Mark Cavendish (GBR)	Bahrain–McLaren	+ 9"
8	Danny van Poppel (NED)	Circus–Wanty Gobert	+ 10"
9	Stefan Bissegger (SUI)	EF Pro Cycling	+ 10"
10	Alberto Dainese (ITA)	Team Sunweb	+ 10"

=== Stage 2 ===
30 September 2020 – Vlissingen to Vlissingen, 11.0 km (6.8 mi) (ITT)

Due to a surge in COVID-19 cases in the Netherlands, race organizers were forced to cancel stage 2, which took place entirely within the Netherlands.

General classification after Stage 2
Rank	Rider	Team	Time
1	Jasper Philipsen (BEL)	UAE Team Emirates	2h 59' 16"
2	Mads Pedersen (DEN)	Trek–Segafredo	+ 4"
3	Mike Teunissen (NED)	Team Jumbo–Visma	+ 5"
4	Pascal Ackermann (GER)	Bora–Hansgrohe	+ 6"
5	Mathieu van der Poel (NED)	Alpecin–Fenix	+ 7"
6	Yves Lampaert (BEL)	Deceuninck–Quick-Step	+ 7"
7	Mark Cavendish (GBR)	Bahrain–McLaren	+ 9"
8	Danny van Poppel (NED)	Circus–Wanty Gobert	+ 10"
9	Stefan Bissegger (SUI)	EF Pro Cycling	+ 10"
10	Alberto Dainese (ITA)	Team Sunweb	+ 10"

=== Stage 3 ===
1 October 2020 – ~~Philippine~~ Aalter to Aalter, 157 km (98 mi)

Due to a surge in COVID-19 cases in the Netherlands, race organizers were forced to reroute stage 3, which would have started in Philippine (Netherlands). Stage 3 started and finished in Aalter (Belgium), and riders completed seven laps of the finishing circuit instead of the original three.

Stage 3 Result
Rank	Rider	Team	Time
1	Mads Pedersen (DEN)	Trek–Segafredo	3h 26' 13"
2	Jasper Philipsen (BEL)	UAE Team Emirates	+ 0"
3	Pascal Ackermann (GER)	Bora–Hansgrohe	+ 0"
4	Danny van Poppel (NED)	Circus–Wanty Gobert	+ 0"
5	Tim Merlier (BEL)	Alpecin–Fenix	+ 0"
6	Zdeněk Štybar (CZE)	Deceuninck–Quick-Step	+ 0"
7	Christophe Laporte (FRA)	Cofidis	+ 0"
8	Florian Sénéchal (FRA)	Deceuninck–Quick-Step	+ 0"
9	Lorrenzo Manzin (FRA)	Total Direct Énergie	+ 0"
10	Sep Vanmarcke (BEL)	EF Pro Cycling	+ 0"

General classification after Stage 3
Rank	Rider	Team	Time
1	Mads Pedersen (DEN)	Trek–Segafredo	6h 25' 23"
2	Jasper Philipsen (BEL)	UAE Team Emirates	+ 0"
3	Jonas Rickaert (BEL)	Alpecin–Fenix	+ 7"
4	Pascal Ackermann (GER)	Bora–Hansgrohe	+ 8"
5	Mike Teunissen (NED)	Team Jumbo–Visma	+ 11"
6	Mathieu van der Poel (NED)	Alpecin–Fenix	+ 13"
7	Yves Lampaert (BEL)	Deceuninck–Quick-Step	+ 13"
8	Mark Cavendish (GBR)	Bahrain–McLaren	+ 15"
9	Danny van Poppel (NED)	Circus–Wanty Gobert	+ 16"
10	Tim Merlier (BEL)	Alpecin–Fenix	+ 16"

=== Stage 4 ===
2 October 2020 – Riemst to Riemst ~~Sittard-Geleen~~, 8.14 km (5.06 mi) (ITT)

Due to a surge in COVID-19 cases in the Netherlands, race organizers were forced to reroute stage 4, which would have started in Riemst (Belgium) and finished in Sittard-Geleen (Netherlands). Stage 4 became an individual time trial starting and finishing in Riemst.

Stage 4 Result
Rank	Rider	Team	Time
1	Søren Kragh Andersen (DEN)	Team Sunweb	9' 59"
2	Stefan Küng (SUI)	Groupama–FDJ	+ 6"
3	Stefan Bissegger (SUI)	EF Pro Cycling	+ 7"
4	Mads Pedersen (DEN)	Trek–Segafredo	+ 8"
5	Mathieu van der Poel (NED)	Alpecin–Fenix	+ 12"
6	Jasha Sütterlin (GER)	Team Sunweb	+ 16"
7	Jannik Steimle (GER)	Deceuninck–Quick-Step	+ 18"
8	Yves Lampaert (BEL)	Deceuninck–Quick-Step	+ 20"
9	Max Walscheid (GER)	NTT Pro Cycling	+ 21"
10	Christophe Laporte (FRA)	Cofidis	+ 21"

General classification after Stage 4
Rank	Rider	Team	Time
1	Mads Pedersen (DEN)	Trek–Segafredo	6h 35' 31"
2	Søren Kragh Andersen (DEN)	Team Sunweb	+ 7"
3	Stefan Küng (SUI)	Groupama–FDJ	+ 13"
4	Stefan Bissegger (SUI)	EF Pro Cycling	+ 14"
5	Mathieu van der Poel (NED)	Alpecin–Fenix	+ 17"
6	Jasper Philipsen (BEL)	UAE Team Emirates	+ 19"
7	Yves Lampaert (BEL)	Deceuninck–Quick-Step	+ 24"
8	Max Walscheid (GER)	NTT Pro Cycling	+ 28"
9	Mike Teunissen (NED)	Team Jumbo–Visma	+ 30"
10	Florian Sénéchal (FRA)	Deceuninck–Quick-Step	+ 31"

=== Stage 5 ===
3 October 2020 – Ottignies-Louvain-la-Neuve to Geraardsbergen, 185.0 km (115.0 mi)

Stage 5 Result
Rank	Rider	Team	Time
1	Mathieu van der Poel (NED)	Alpecin–Fenix	4h 07' 39"
2	Oliver Naesen (BEL)	AG2R La Mondiale	+ 4"
3	Sonny Colbrelli (ITA)	Bahrain–McLaren	+ 4"
4	Søren Kragh Andersen (DEN)	Team Sunweb	+ 4"
5	Stefan Küng (SUI)	Groupama–FDJ	+ 8"
6	Dimitri Claeys (BEL)	Cofidis	+ 47"
7	Yves Lampaert (BEL)	Deceuninck–Quick-Step	+ 50"
8	Iván García (ESP)	Bahrain–McLaren	+ 1' 08"
9	Jempy Drucker (LUX)	Bora–Hansgrohe	+ 1' 12"
10	Florian Sénéchal (FRA)	Deceuninck–Quick-Step	+ 1' 12"

General classification after Stage 5
Rank	Rider	Team	Time
1	Mathieu van der Poel (NED)	Alpecin–Fenix	10h 43' 08"
2	Søren Kragh Andersen (DEN)	Team Sunweb	+ 8"
3	Stefan Küng (SUI)	Groupama–FDJ	+ 23"
4	Yves Lampaert (BEL)	Deceuninck–Quick-Step	+ 1' 16"
5	Mads Pedersen (DEN)	Trek–Segafredo	+ 1' 21"
6	Sonny Colbrelli (ITA)	Bahrain–McLaren	+ 1' 42"
7	Florian Sénéchal (FRA)	Deceuninck–Quick-Step	+ 1' 45"
8	Mike Teunissen (NED)	Team Jumbo–Visma	+ 1' 49"
9	Florian Vermeersch (BEL)	Lotto–Soudal	+ 1' 59"
10	John Degenkolb (GER)	Lotto–Soudal	+ 2' 02"

== Classification leadership table ==
Classification leadership by stage
Stage	Winner	General classification	Points classification	Combativity classification	Teams classification
1	Jasper Philipsen	Jasper Philipsen	Jasper Philipsen	Milan Menten	Alpecin–Fenix
2	Cancelled	Jasper Philipsen	Jasper Philipsen	Milan Menten	Alpecin–Fenix
3	Mads Pedersen	Mads Pedersen	Mads Pedersen	Kenneth Van Rooy	Alpecin–Fenix
4	Søren Kragh Andersen	Mads Pedersen	Mads Pedersen	Kenneth Van Rooy	Team Sunweb
5	Mathieu van der Poel	Mathieu van der Poel	Mads Pedersen	Kenneth Van Rooy	Alpecin–Fenix
Final		Mathieu van der Poel	Mads Pedersen	Kenneth Van Rooy	Alpecin–Fenix

- Due to the cancellation of stage 2, all the jersey wearers after stage 1 retained their jerseys and wore them on stage 3.
- On stage 3, Mads Pedersen, who was second in the points classification, wore the red jersey, because first placed Jasper Philipsen wore the green jersey as the leader of the general classification.
- On stages 4 and 5, Jasper Philipsen, who was second in the points classification, wore the red jersey, because first placed Mads Pedersen wore the green jersey as the leader of the general classification.

== Final classification standings ==
Legend
Denotes the winner of the general classification
Denotes the winner of the points classification
Denotes the winner of the combativity classification

=== General classification ===
Final general classification (1–10)
Rank	Rider	Team	Time
1	Mathieu van der Poel (NED)	Alpecin–Fenix	10h 43' 08"
2	Søren Kragh Andersen (DEN)	Team Sunweb	+ 8"
3	Stefan Küng (SUI)	Groupama–FDJ	+ 23"
4	Yves Lampaert (BEL)	Deceuninck–Quick-Step	+ 1' 16"
5	Mads Pedersen (DEN)	Trek–Segafredo	+ 1' 21"
6	Sonny Colbrelli (ITA)	Bahrain–McLaren	+ 1' 42"
7	Florian Sénéchal (FRA)	Deceuninck–Quick-Step	+ 1' 45"
8	Mike Teunissen (NED)	Team Jumbo–Visma	+ 1' 49"
9	Florian Vermeersch (BEL)	Lotto–Soudal	+ 1' 59"
10	John Degenkolb (GER)	Lotto–Soudal	+ 2' 02"

=== Points classification ===
Final points classification (1–10)
Rank	Rider	Team	Points
1	Mads Pedersen (DEN)	Trek–Segafredo	74
2	Mathieu van der Poel (NED)	Alpecin–Fenix	58
3	Jasper Philipsen (BEL)	UAE Team Emirates	55
4	Søren Kragh Andersen (DEN)	Team Sunweb	49
5	Stefan Küng (SUI)	Groupama–FDJ	42
6	Stefan Bissegger (SUI)	EF Pro Cycling	39
7	Danny van Poppel (NED)	Circus–Wanty Gobert	38
8	Tim Merlier (BEL)	Alpecin–Fenix	27
9	Yves Lampaert (BEL)	Deceuninck–Quick-Step	25
10	Oliver Naesen (BEL)	AG2R La Mondiale	25

=== Combativity classification ===
Final combativity classification (1–10)
Rank	Rider	Team	Points
1	Kenneth Van Rooy (BEL)	Sport Vlaanderen–Baloise	28
2	Dries De Bondt (BEL)	Alpecin–Fenix	19
3	Pim Ligthart (NED)	Total Direct Énergie	16
4	Oscar Riesebeek (NED)	Alpecin–Fenix	16
5	Brian van Goethem (NED)	Lotto–Soudal	15
6	Mathieu van der Poel (NED)	Alpecin–Fenix	12
7	Ludovic Robeet (BEL)	Bingoal–Wallonie Bruxelles	12
8	Jonas Rickaert (BEL)	Alpecin–Fenix	12
9	Adrien Petit (FRA)	Total Direct Énergie	12
10	Florian Sénéchal (FRA)	Deceuninck–Quick-Step	10

=== Teams classification ===
Final teams classification (1–10)
Rank	Team	Time
1	Alpecin–Fenix	32h 14' 44"
2	Deceuninck–Quick-Step	+ 15"
3	AG2R La Mondiale	+ 1' 09"
4	Lotto–Soudal	+ 1' 31"
5	Circus–Wanty Gobert	+ 2' 12"
6	Groupama–FDJ	+ 3' 23"
7	Cofidis	+ 3' 34"
8	EF Pro Cycling	+ 3' 49"
9	INEOS Grenadiers	+ 4' 15"
10	UAE Team Emirates	+ 4' 54"
