= Yves Lampaert =

Belgian cyclist

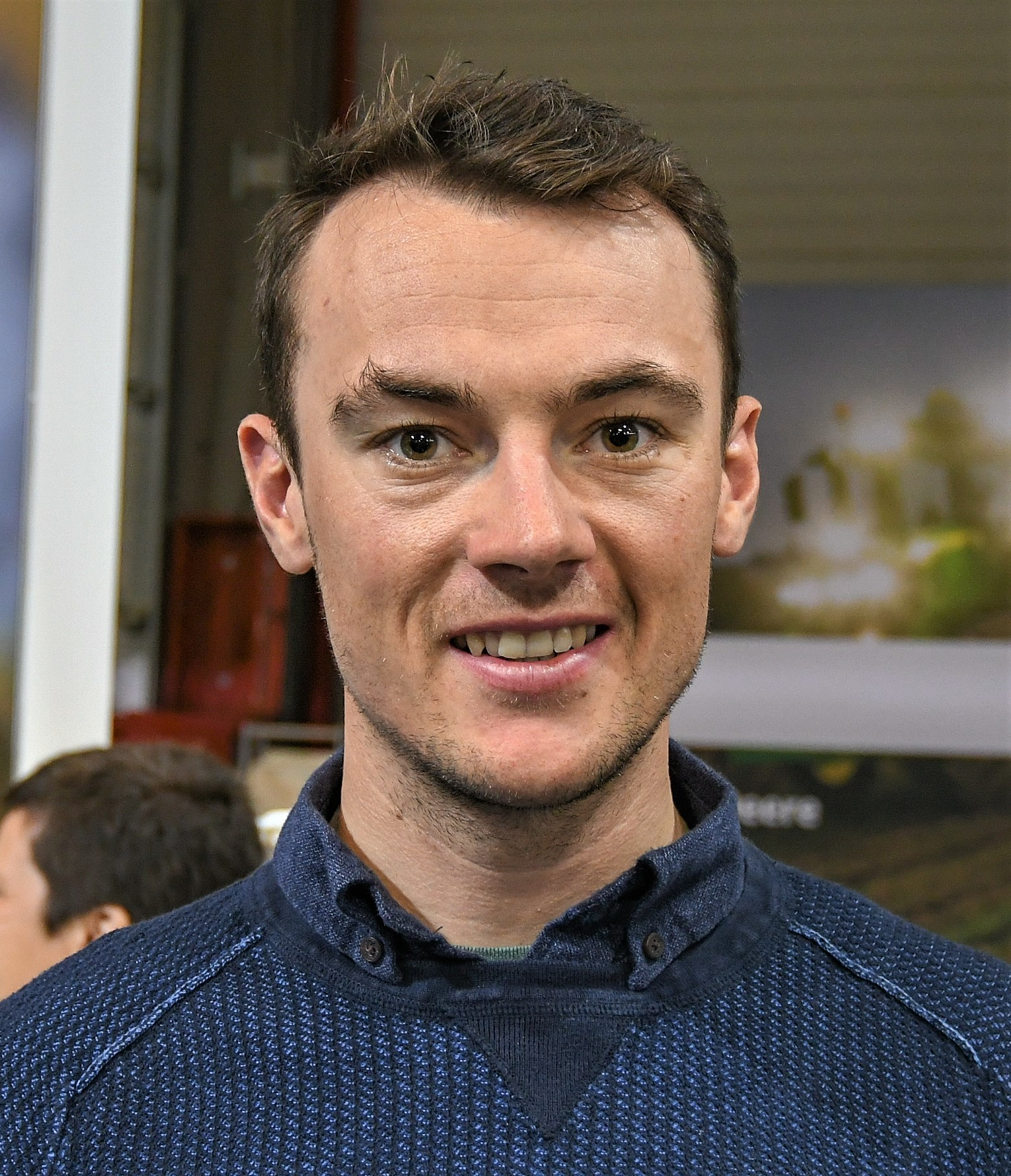
- Lampaert in 2019

Personal information
- Full name: Yves Lampaert
- Nicknames: Lampi; The Bull From Ingelmunster
- Born: 10 April 1991 (age 35) Izegem, Flanders, Belgium
- Height: 1.80 m (5 ft 11 in)
- Weight: 75 kg (165 lb; 11 st 11 lb)

Cycling career
- Sport: Cycling
- Current team: Soudal–Quick-Step
- Discipline: Road
- Role: Rider
- Rider type: Classics specialist

Amateur teams
- 2010–2011: Soenens–Jartazi–Construkt Glas
- 2012: EFC–Omega Pharma–Quick-Step

Professional teams
- 2013–2014: Topsport Vlaanderen–Baloise
- 2015–: Etixx–Quick-Step

Major wins
- Grand Tours Tour de France 1 individual stage (2022) Vuelta a España 1 individual stage (2017) One-day races and Classics National Road Race Championships (2018) National Time Trial Championships (2017, 2021) Dwars door Vlaanderen (2017, 2018) Three Days of Bruges–De Panne (2020)
Medal record
Men's road bicycle racing
World Championships
Representing Etixx–Quick-Step
Gold medal – first place	2018 Innsbruck	Team time trial
Gold medal – first place	2016 Doha	Team time trial
Silver medal – second place	2015 Richmond	Team time trial
Representing Belgium
European Championships
Silver medal – second place	2019 Alkmaar	Road race

Yves Lampaert (born 10 April 1991) is a Belgian professional road racing cyclist, who rides for UCI WorldTeam Soudal–Quick-Step.

== Career ==
Lampaert practiced judo from the age of six, earned a black belt, but at the age of 17 started training in cycling.

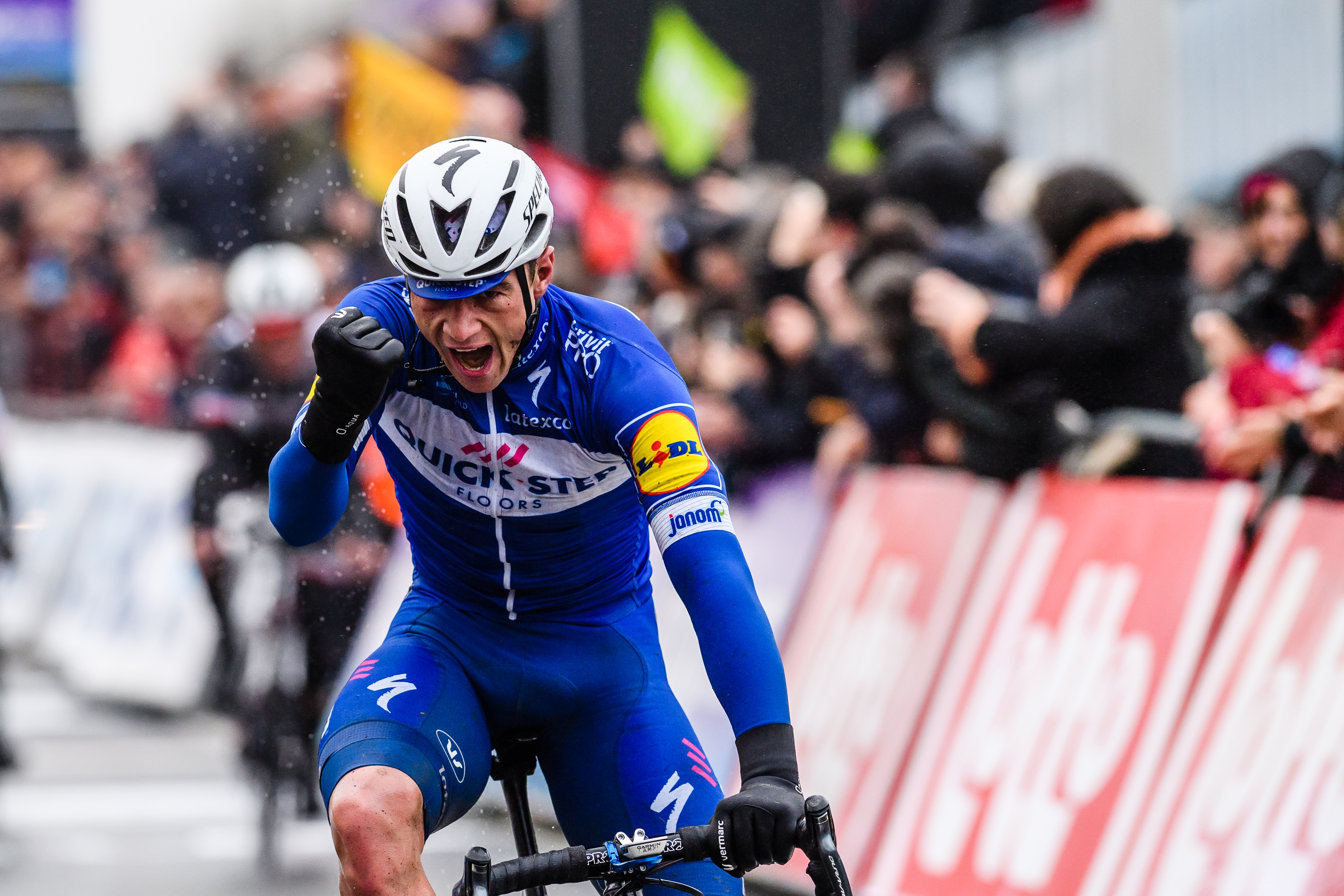
In 2018, Lampaert won Dwars door Vlaanderen for the second consecutive year, the first rider to win successive editions.

He rode at the 2014 and 2015 UCI Road World Championships. He was named in the startlist for the 2016 Vuelta a España.

Lampaert won the 2017 Dwars door Vlaanderen, a local race for him, after he soloed away to the victory after making the race-defining split along with teammate Philippe Gilbert, Alexey Lutsenko from the Astana team, and Orica–Scott's Luke Durbridge. Lampaert attacked with 7.5 kilometres (4.7 miles) remaining and ultimately won the race by 39 seconds ahead of Gilbert.

Lampaert won Stage 2 of the 2017 Vuelta a España after he broke clear of the peloton in strong winds with three kilometres to go with three Quick Step teammates, Niki Terpstra, Julian Alaphilippe and Matteo Trentin. Lampaert then attacked to take a solo victory and by doing so he gained the race leader's red jersey.

In 2018, Lampaert won Dwars door Vlaanderen for the second year in a row, becoming the first rider to win the race in consecutive years. In July 2018, he was named in the start list for the 2018 Tour de France.

Lampaert won the first stage of the 2022 Tour de France, ahead of Wout van Aert and Tadej Pogačar. In July 2025, Lampaert extended his contract with Soudal Quick-Step for a further two seasons, keeping him with the team until the end of 2027 in a road captain and mentoring role.

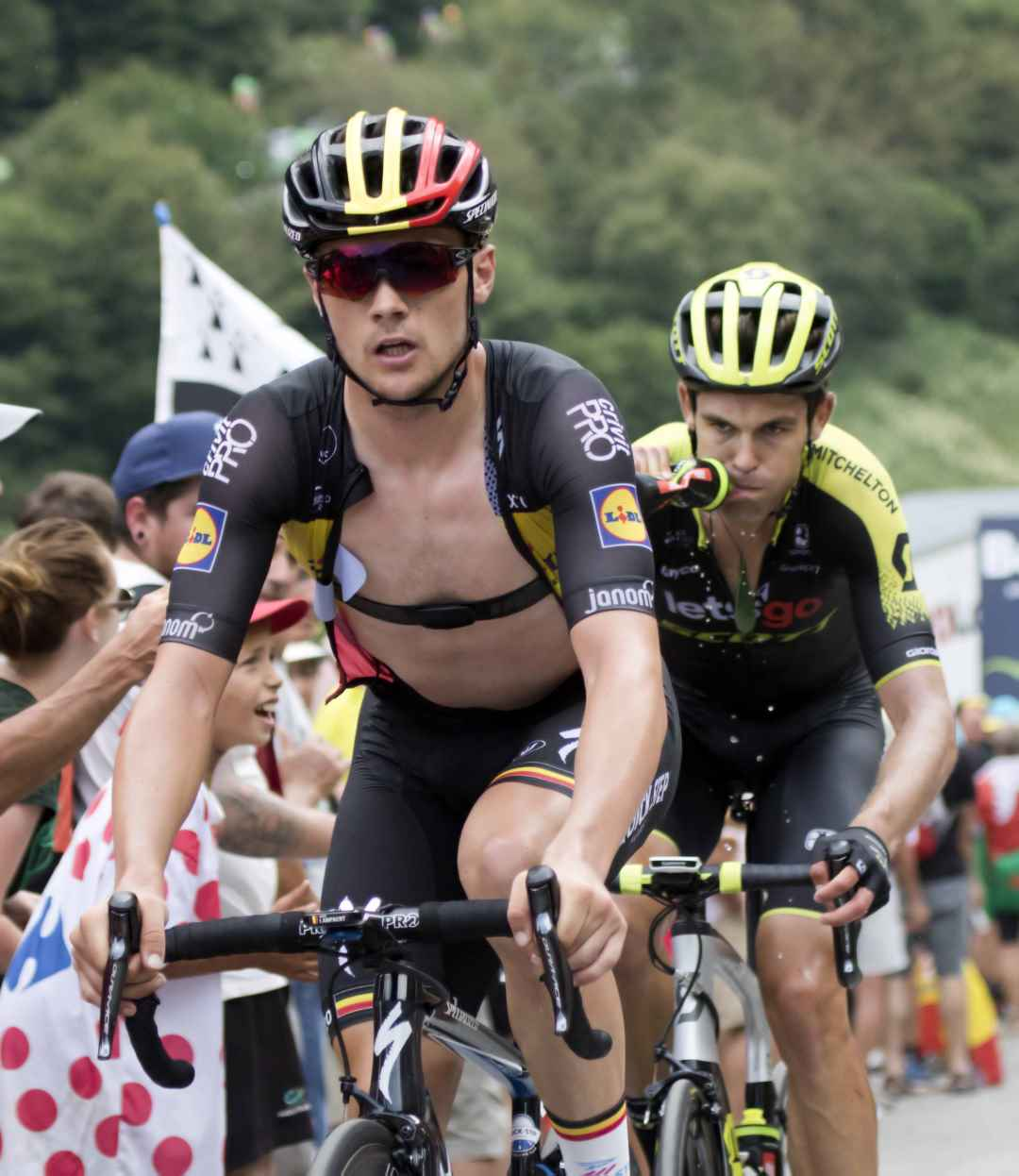
Lampaert at the 2018 Tour de France

== Personal life ==
Lampaert is the son of a farmer, with his family owning a 60-acre (24-hectare) property in Ingelmunster.

== Major results ==
2012
1st Time trial, National Under-23 Road Championships
2nd Paris–Roubaix Espoirs
7th Paris–Tours Espoirs
2013
1st Grote Prijs Stad Geel
5th Time trial, National Road Championships
5th Châteauroux Classic
9th Druivenkoers Overijse
10th Overall Tour des Fjords
2014 (1 pro win)
1st Arnhem–Veenendaal Classic
4th Kuurne–Brussels–Kuurne
5th Road race, National Road Championships
5th Ronde van Drenthe
6th Ronde van Zeeland Seaports
9th Halle–Ingooigem
2015 (2)
1st Overall Driedaagse van West-Vlaanderen

1st Points classification
1st Young rider classification
1st West Flanders classification
1st Stage 1

2nd Team time trial, UCI Road World Championships
2nd Time trial, National Road Championships
2nd Overall Ster ZLM Toer
4th Ronde van Zeeland Seaports
5th Le Samyn
6th Paris–Tours
7th Paris–Roubaix
9th Overall Three Days of De Panne
9th Rund um Köln
10th RideLondon–Surrey Classic
2016
UCI Road World Championships

1st Team time trial
7th Time trial

2nd Time trial, National Road Championships
5th Eschborn–Frankfurt – Rund um den Finanzplatz
6th Time trial, UEC European Road Championships
9th Overall Tour of Belgium
2017 (3)
1st Time trial, National Road Championships
1st Dwars door Vlaanderen
1st Gullegem Koerse
Vuelta a España

1st Stage 2
Held & after Stage 2

7th Paris–Tours
2018 (2)
1st Team time trial, UCI Road World Championships
National Road Championships

1st Road race
3rd Time trial

1st Dwars door Vlaanderen
2nd Binche–Chimay–Binche
4th Time trial, UEC European Road Championships
5th Great War Remembrance Race
2019 (2)
1st Overall Okolo Slovenska
1st Gullegem Koerse
1st Stage 8 (ITT) Tour de Suisse
UEC European Road Championships

2nd Road race
7th Time trial

2nd Time trial, National Road Championships
3rd Overall Deutschland Tour
3rd Paris–Roubaix
5th Kuurne–Brussels–Kuurne
7th Omloop Het Nieuwsblad
8th Dwars door Vlaanderen
2020 (1)
1st Three Days of Bruges–De Panne
2nd Omloop Het Nieuwsblad
4th Overall BinckBank Tour
5th Tour of Flanders
7th Gent–Wevelgem
8th Overall Okolo Slovenska
2021 (2)
1st Time trial, National Road Championships
1st Stage 7 Tour of Britain
2nd Overall Tour of Belgium
2nd Heistse Pijl
3rd Dwars door het Hageland
4th Dwars door Vlaanderen
5th Paris–Roubaix
6th Primus Classic
2022 (2)
Tour de France

1st Stage 1 (ITT)
Held & after Stage 1

1st Stage 3 (ITT) Tour of Belgium
2nd Time trial, National Road Championships
6th Grand Prix de Fourmies
9th Time trial, UCI Road World Championships
10th Paris–Roubaix
2023
3rd Overall Renewi Tour
3rd Classic Brugge–De Panne
4th Overall Tour of Belgium
4th Dwars door het Hageland
6th Hamburg Cyclassics
8th Circuit Franco-Belge
9th Time trial, UEC European Road Championships
2024 (1)
1st Stage 1 (ITT) Tour de Suisse
2nd Gullegem Koerse
9th Trofeo Palma
2025
5th Overall Tour of Holland

=== Grand Tour general classification results timeline ===
Grand Tour	2016	2017	2018	2019	2020	2021	2022	2023	2024
Giro d'Italia	Has not contested during his career								
Tour de France	—	—	80	133	—	—	119	104	125
Vuelta a España	113	136	—	—	—	—	—	—	

=== Classics results timeline ===
Monument	2013	2014	2015	2016	2017	2018	2019	2020	2021	2022	2023	2024	2025
Milan–San Remo	—	—	—	—	—	—	66	—	54	—	20	—	—
Tour of Flanders	—	DNF	24	—	36	29	17	5	17	30	41	18	38
Paris–Roubaix	—	108	7	—	82	28	3	NH	5	10	24	36	28
Liège–Bastogne–Liège	Has not contested during his career												
Giro di Lombardia	Has not contested during his career												
Classic	2013	2014	2015	2016	2017	2018	2019	2020	2021	2022	2023	2024	2025
Omloop Het Nieuwsblad	—	—	—	—	97	36	7	2	56	72	71	21	51
Kuurne–Brussels–Kuurne	NH	4	72	—	83	12	5	52	68	76	76	27	69
Brugge–De Panne	Previously a stage race					—	—	1	—	—	3	—	119
E3 Harelbeke	DNF	36	21	—	—	17	18	NH	13	—	16	28	—
Gent–Wevelgem	—	DNF	—	—	49	20	77	7	14	39	67	56	51
Dwars door Vlaanderen	37	27	17	DNS	1	1	8	NH	4	27	—	131	19
Hamburg Cyclassics	—	—	—	—	—	—	63	Not held		108	6	—	—
Paris–Tours	—	—	6	—	7	73	—	—	—	—	—	—	—

Legend
—	Did not compete
DNF	Did not finish
DNS	Did not start
NH	Not held
IP	In progress
