= 2020 Gent–Wevelgem =

Cycling race

2020 UCI World Tour, race 18 of 21
- Previous winner Alexander Kristoff portrayed on the event poster

Race details
- Dates: 11 October 2020
- Stages: 1
- Distance: 238 km (148 mi)
- Winning time: 5h 19' 20"

Results
	Winner	Mads Pedersen (DEN)	(Trek–Segafredo)
	Second	Florian Sénéchal (FRA)	(Deceuninck–Quick-Step)
	Third	Matteo Trentin (ITA)	(CCC Team)

The 2020 Gent–Wevelgem – In Flanders Fields was a road cycling classic race that took place on 11 October 2020 in Belgium, over a distance of 238 kilometres between its new starting location of Ypres and the traditional finish in Wevelgem. It was the 82nd edition of Gent–Wevelgem and the eighteenth event of the 2020 UCI World Tour. The winner was Denmark's Mads Pedersen of the Trek–Segafredo team.

One of the Spring Classics, Gent-Wevelgem was originally scheduled for 29 March 2020, but was cancelled due to the COVID-19 pandemic in Belgium. The race was rescheduled for 11 October 2020 as part of a new autumnal 'spring classics' season, though it was only the Belgian races which were eventually held.

== Route ==
The race organisers asked spectators to follow the race from home, and did not release details of the route to the public before the start of the race. Parts of the race due to pass through France were removed due to the worsening of the pandemic in France. The start times of the races were also adapted to avoid a clash with the 2020 Giro d'Italia. For the first time, the men's race started before the women's race.

== Teams ==
All nineteen UCI WorldTeams and six UCI ProTeams made up the twenty-five teams that competed in the race. Though most teams entered the maximum of seven riders, Cofidis, Groupama–FDJ, and Team Sunweb entered only six, while Movistar Team entered only five. Only 95 of the 170 riders in the race finished.

UCI WorldTeams

- AG2R La Mondiale
- Astana
- Bahrain–McLaren
- Bora–Hansgrohe
- CCC Team
- Cofidis
- Deceuninck–Quick-Step
- EF Pro Cycling
- Groupama–FDJ
- Israel Start-Up Nation
- Lotto–Soudal
- Mitchelton–Scott
- Movistar Team
- NTT Pro Cycling
- INEOS Grenadiers
- Team Jumbo–Visma
- Team Sunweb
- Trek–Segafredo
- UAE Team Emirates

UCI ProTeams

- Alpecin–Fenix
- B&B Hotels–Vital Concept
- Bingoal–Wallonie Bruxelles
- Circus–Wanty Gobert
- Sport Vlaanderen–Baloise
- Total Direct Énergie

== Result ==
Result
Rank	Rider	Team	Time
1	Mads Pedersen (DEN)	Trek–Segafredo	5h 19' 20"
2	Florian Sénéchal (FRA)	Deceuninck–Quick-Step	+ 0"
3	Matteo Trentin (ITA)	CCC Team	+ 0"
4	Alberto Bettiol (ITA)	EF Pro Cycling	+ 1"
5	Stefan Küng (SUI)	Groupama–FDJ	+ 3"
6	John Degenkolb (GER)	Lotto–Soudal	+ 4"
7	Yves Lampaert (BEL)	Deceuninck–Quick-Step	+ 4"
8	Wout van Aert (BEL)	Team Jumbo–Visma	+ 7"
9	Mathieu van der Poel (NED)	Alpecin–Fenix	+ 8"
10	Dylan Teuns (BEL)	Bahrain–McLaren	+ 1' 40"
