= 2020 Milan–San Remo =

Cycling race

2020 UCI World Tour, race 8 of 21
- Official event poster

Race details
- Dates: 8 August 2020
- Stages: 1
- Distance: 305 km (190 mi)
- Winning time: 7h 16' 09"

Results
	Winner	Wout van Aert (BEL)	(Team Jumbo–Visma)
	Second	Julian Alaphilippe (FRA)	(Deceuninck–Quick-Step)
	Third	Michael Matthews (AUS)	(Team Sunweb)

The 2020 Milan–San Remo was scheduled to be held on 21 March 2020, but was postponed to 8 August due to the COVID-19 pandemic in Italy. The postponement was made by RCS Sport on 6 March. It was the 111th edition of the Milan–San Remo one-day cycling classic in Northern Italy, and part of the 2020 UCI World Tour calendar.

Belgian rider Wout van Aert of Team Jumbo–Visma, who had won the 2020 Strade Bianche a week earlier, beat French rider Julian Alaphilippe, the defending champion, of Deceuninck–Quick-Step, in a two-up sprint to take the victory, after the duo had broken away from the peloton on the ascent of the Poggio.

== Teams ==
All nineteen UCI WorldTeams and eight UCI ProTeams were invited to the race. Each of the twenty-seven teams entered six riders each that made up the 162 riders that participated in the race, of which 149 riders finished.

UCI WorldTeams

- AG2R La Mondiale
- Astana
- Bahrain–McLaren
- Bora–Hansgrohe
- CCC Team
- Cofidis
- Deceuninck–Quick-Step
- EF Pro Cycling
- Groupama–FDJ
- Israel Start-Up Nation
- Lotto–Soudal
- Mitchelton–Scott
- Movistar Team
- NTT Pro Cycling
- Team INEOS
- Team Jumbo–Visma
- Team Sunweb
- Trek–Segafredo
- UAE Team Emirates

UCI ProTeams

- Alpecin–Fenix
- Androni Giocattoli–Sidermec
- Arkéa–Samsic
- Bardiani–CSF–Faizanè
- Circus–Wanty Gobert
- Gazprom–RusVelo
- Total Direct Énergie
- Vini Zabù–KTM

== Route ==
The race followed a new route, firstly due to the extraordinary conditions of the COVID-19 pandemic, and then by the sudden refusal, just a few weeks before the race, by the mayors of several seaside towns to let the race pass through the coastal highway, or "Via Aurelia", owing to the August tourist traffic. The race ended up being 305 kilometres (190 mi) long, with a heavy detour through the Langhe hills and the Tanaro river valley before reaching the western Ligurian coast through the Col di Nava pass and the Colle San Bartolomeo tunnel, only reaching the usual route at Imperia.

== Result ==
Result
Rank	Rider	Team	Time
1	Wout van Aert (BEL)	Team Jumbo–Visma	7h 16' 09"
2	Julian Alaphilippe (FRA)	Deceuninck–Quick-Step	+ 0"
3	Michael Matthews (AUS)	Team Sunweb	+ 2"
4	Peter Sagan (SVK)	Bora–Hansgrohe	+ 2"
5	Giacomo Nizzolo (ITA)	NTT Pro Cycling	+ 2"
6	Dion Smith (NZL)	Mitchelton–Scott	+ 2"
7	Alex Aranburu (ESP)	Astana	+ 2"
8	Greg Van Avermaet (BEL)	CCC Team	+ 2"
9	Philippe Gilbert (BEL)	Lotto–Soudal	+ 2"
10	Matej Mohorič (SLO)	Bahrain–McLaren	+ 2"
