= 2019 Dwars door Vlaanderen =

Cycling race

2019 UCI World Tour, race 13 of 38
- Event poster with previous winner Yves Lampaert

Race details
- Dates: 3 April 2019
- Stages: 1
- Distance: 182.8 km (113.6 mi)
- Winning time: 4h 05' 52"

Results
	Winner	Mathieu van der Poel (NED)	(Corendon–Circus)
	Second	Anthony Turgis (FRA)	(Direct Énergie)
	Third	Bob Jungels (LUX)	(Deceuninck–Quick-Step)

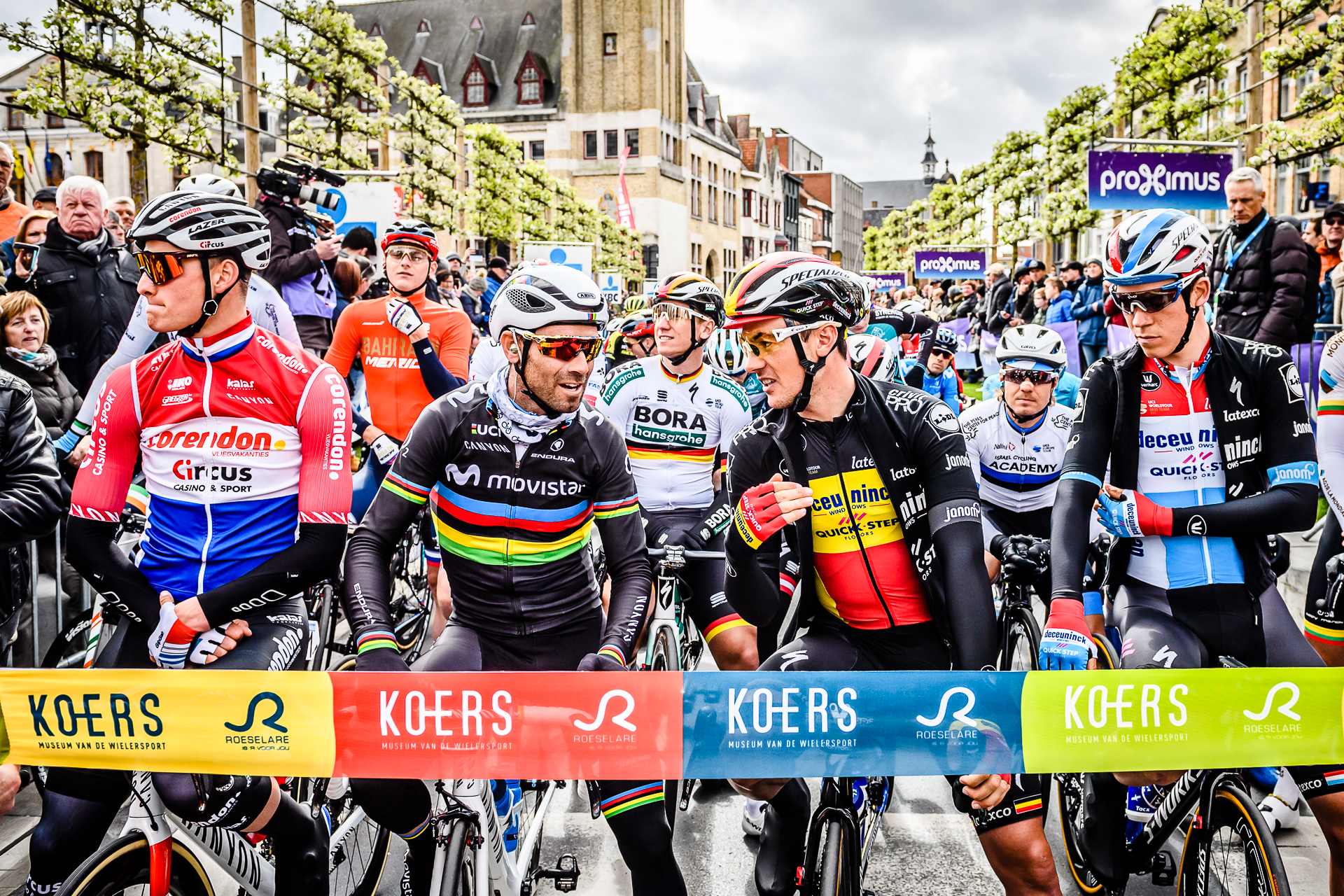
Participants of the race waiting for the starting shot.

The 2019 Dwars door Vlaanderen is a road cycling one-day race that took place on 3 April 2019 in Belgium. It was the 74th edition of Dwars door Vlaanderen and the 13th event of the 2019 UCI World Tour. The race was won by Mathieu van der Poel.

== Result ==
Result
Rank	Rider	Team	Time
1	Mathieu van der Poel (NED)	Corendon–Circus	4h 05' 54"
2	Anthony Turgis (FRA)	Direct Énergie	+ 0"
3	Bob Jungels (LUX)	Deceuninck–Quick-Step	+ 0"
4	Lukas Pöstlberger (AUT)	Bora–Hansgrohe	+ 0"
5	Tiesj Benoot (BEL)	Lotto–Soudal	+ 0"
6	Luke Rowe (GBR)	Team Sky	+ 18"
7	Danny van Poppel (NED)	Team Jumbo–Visma	+ 19"
8	Yves Lampaert (BEL)	Deceuninck–Quick-Step	+ 19"
9	Christophe Laporte (FRA)	Cofidis	+ 19"
10	Heinrich Haussler (AUS)	Bahrain–Merida	+ 19"

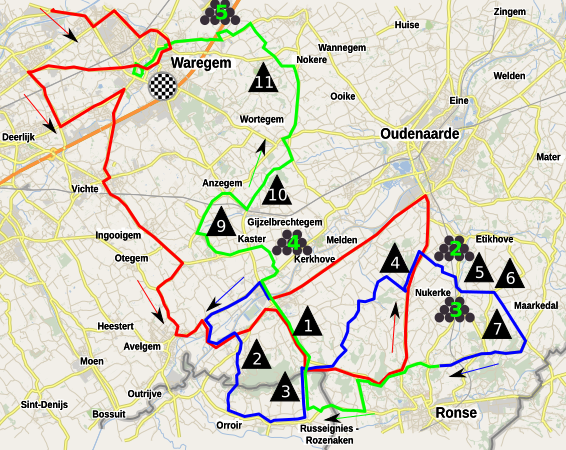
Route of the 2019 Dwars door Vlaanderen
