= 2020 Three Days of Bruges–De Panne =

Cycling race

2020 UCI World Tour, race 21 of 21

Race details
- Dates: 21 October 2020
- Stages: 1
- Distance: 189.6 km (117.8 mi)
- Winning time: 3h 57' 06"

Results
	Winner	Yves Lampaert (BEL)	(Deceuninck–Quick-Step)
	Second	Tim Declercq (BEL)	(Deceuninck–Quick-Step)
	Third	Tim Merlier (BEL)	(Alpecin–Fenix)

The 2020 Three Days of Bruges–De Panne is a road cycling one-day race that took place on 21 October 2020 in Belgium. It was the 44th edition of the Three Days of Bruges–De Panne, and the 22nd event of the 2020 UCI World Tour.

== Teams ==
Twenty-five teams were invited to the race, which included seventeen UCI WorldTour teams and eight UCI Professional Continental teams.

UCI WorldTeams

- Astana
- Bahrain–McLaren
- Bora–Hansgrohe
- CCC Team
- Cofidis
- Deceuninck–Quick-Step
- EF Pro Cycling
- Groupama–FDJ
- Israel Start-Up Nation
- Lotto–Soudal
- Mitchelton–Scott
- Movistar Team
- NTT Pro Cycling
- Team Jumbo–Visma
- Team Sunweb
- Trek–Segafredo
- UAE Team Emirates

UCI Professional Continental Teams

- Alpecin–Fenix
- Arkéa–Samsic
- B&B Hotels–Vital Concept
- Bingoal–Wallonie Bruxelles
- Circus–Wanty Gobert
- Riwal Securitas
- Sport Vlaanderen–Baloise
- Total Direct Énergie

== Result ==
Result
Rank	Rider	Team	Time
1	Yves Lampaert (BEL)	Deceuninck–Quick-Step	3h 57' 06"
2	Tim Declercq (BEL)	Deceuninck–Quick-Step	+ 22"
3	Tim Merlier (BEL)	Alpecin–Fenix	+ 23"
4	John Degenkolb (GER)	Lotto–Soudal	+ 23"
5	Jempy Drucker (LUX)	Bora–Hansgrohe	+ 23"
6	Matteo Trentin (ITA)	CCC Team	+ 23"
7	Bert Van Lerberghe (BEL)	Deceuninck–Quick-Step	+ 23"
8	Stefan Küng (SUI)	Groupama–FDJ	+ 23"
9	Kasper Asgreen (DEN)	Deceuninck–Quick-Step	+ 23"
10	Jonas Rickaert (BEL)	Alpecin–Fenix	+ 28"
