= 2020 Tour of Flanders =

Cycling race

2020 UCI World Tour, race 19 of 21
- Event poster with previous winners Marta Bastianelli and Alberto Bettiol

Race details
- Dates: 18 October 2020
- Stages: 1
- Distance: 243.3 km (151.2 mi)
- Winning time: 5h 43' 22"

Results
	Winner	Mathieu van der Poel (NED)	(Alpecin–Fenix)
	Second	Wout Van Aert (BEL)	(Team Jumbo–Visma)
	Third	Alexander Kristoff (NOR)	(UAE Team Emirates)

The 104th edition of the Tour of Flanders one-day cycling classic was held on 18 October 2020, as the 20th event of the 2020 UCI World Tour. The race started in Antwerp and finished in Oudenaarde, Belgium, covering a distance of 241 km. Mathieu van der Poel of the Netherlands won the race, just ahead of Belgian Wout van Aert.

The race was originally scheduled on 5 April 2020, serving as the 14th event of the 2020 UCI World Tour, but was postponed due to the COVID-19 pandemic On 17 March 2020 the organisers announced the race would not run on the planned date; on 5 May it was rescheduled for 18 October. The men's event was slightly reduced in distance, because of the unprecedented end-of-season slot and in order to deal with the intense October campaign.

== Teams ==
The teams participating in the race were:

UCI WorldTeams

- AG2R La Mondiale
- Astana
- Bahrain–McLaren
- Bora–Hansgrohe
- CCC Team
- Cofidis
- Elegant–Quick-Step (Note: For this race, Deceuninck–Quick-Step competed with 'Elegant–Quick-Step' jerseys to promote one of Deceuninck's window products.)
- EF Pro Cycling
- Groupama–FDJ
- Israel Start-Up Nation
- Lotto–Soudal
- Mitchelton–Scott
- Movistar Team
- NTT Pro Cycling
- Ineos Grenadiers
- Team Jumbo–Visma
- Team Sunweb
- Trek–Segafredo
- UAE Team Emirates

UCI Professional Continental teams

- Alpecin–Fenix
- Bingoal–Wallonie Bruxelles
- B&B Hotels–Vital Concept
- Circus–Wanty Gobert
- Total Direct Énergie

== Result ==
Result
Rank	Rider	Team	Time
1	Mathieu van der Poel (NED)	Alpecin–Fenix	5h 43' 22"
2	Wout Van Aert (BEL)	Team Jumbo–Visma	+ 0"
3	Alexander Kristoff (NOR)	UAE Team Emirates	+ 8"
4	Anthony Turgis (FRA)	Total Direct Énergie	+ 8"
5	Yves Lampaert (BEL)	Elegant–Quick-Step	+ 8"
6	Dimitri Claeys (BEL)	Cofidis	+ 8"
7	Oliver Naesen (BEL)	AG2R La Mondiale	+ 8"
8	Dylan van Baarle (NED)	Ineos Grenadiers	+ 8"
9	John Degenkolb (GER)	Lotto–Soudal	+ 8"
10	Tiesj Benoot (BEL)	Team Sunweb	+ 8"
