= 2020 Strade Bianche =

2020 UCI World Tour, race 6 of 21
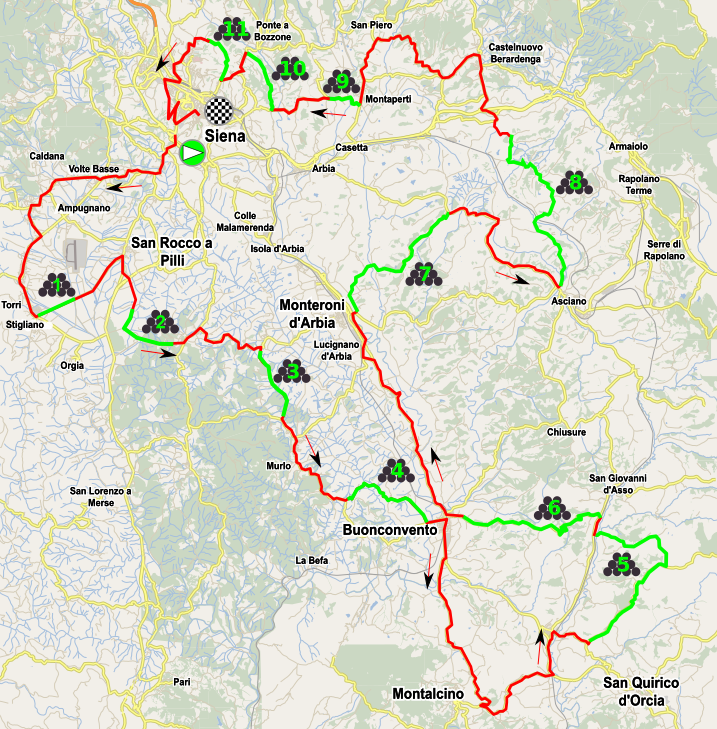

Race details
- Dates: 1 August 2020
- Stages: 1
- Distance: 184 km (114.3 mi)
- Winning time: 4h 58' 56"

Results
	Winner	Wout van Aert (BEL)	(Team Jumbo–Visma)
	Second	Davide Formolo (ITA)	(UAE Team Emirates)
	Third	Maximilian Schachmann (GER)	(Bora–Hansgrohe)

The 14th edition of the Strade Bianche was held on 1 August 2020. Starting and finishing in Siena, Italy, it was the sixth event of the 2020 UCI World Tour. The race was originally scheduled for 7 March 2020 but was postponed to 1 August 2020 due to the COVID-19 pandemic. After finishing third in the past two editions of the race, Belgian Wout van Aert of Team Jumbo–Visma won the race in just under five hours after going solo with around 13 kilometers to go.

== Teams ==
Twenty-four teams, including 18 of the 19 UCI WorldTeams and six UCI Professional Continental teams. All but two teams entered seven riders; AG2R La Mondiale and Israel Start-Up Nation only entered six riders. Of the 166 riders that started the race, only 42 finished, while a further 8 riders finished over the time limit.

UCI WorldTeams

- AG2R La Mondiale
- Astana
- Bahrain–McLaren
- Bora–Hansgrohe
- CCC Team
- Deceuninck–Quick-Step
- EF Pro Cycling
- Groupama–FDJ
- Israel Start-Up Nation
- Lotto–Soudal
- Mitchelton–Scott
- Movistar Team
- NTT Pro Cycling
- Team Ineos
- Team Jumbo–Visma
- Team Sunweb
- Trek–Segafredo
- UAE Team Emirates

UCI Professional Continental teams

- Alpecin–Fenix
- Androni Giocattoli–Sidermec
- Arkéa–Samsic
- Bardiani–CSF–Faizanè
- B&B Hotels–Vital Concept
- Circus–Wanty Gobert

== Result ==
Result
Rank	Rider	Team	Time
1	Wout van Aert (BEL)	Team Jumbo–Visma	4h 58' 56"
2	Davide Formolo (ITA)	UAE Team Emirates	+ 30"
3	Maximilian Schachmann (GER)	Bora–Hansgrohe	+ 32"
4	Alberto Bettiol (ITA)	EF Pro Cycling	+ 1' 31"
5	Jakob Fuglsang (DEN)	Astana	+ 2' 55"
6	Zdeněk Štybar (CZE)	Deceuninck–Quick-Step	+ 3' 59"
7	Brent Bookwalter (USA)	Mitchelton–Scott	+ 4' 25"
8	Greg Van Avermaet (BEL)	CCC Team	+ 4' 27"
9	Michael Gogl (AUT)	NTT Pro Cycling	+ 6' 47"
10	Diego Rosa (ITA)	Arkéa–Samsic	+ 7' 45"
