= 2020 EF Pro Cycling season =

EF Pro Cycling
- 2020 season
- UCI code: EFD
- Status: UCI WorldTeam
- Manager: Jonathan Vaughters
- Main sponsor(s): Cannondale
- Based: Boulder, Colorado, United States
- Bicycles: Cannondale
- Groupset: Shimano

Season victories
- One-day races: 1
- Stage race overall: 2
- Stage race stages: 12
- National Championships: 2
- Most wins: Sergio Higuita; Daniel Martínez (5 each)
- Jersey

The 2020 season for the EF Pro Cycling cycling team began in January at the Tour Down Under.

== Team roster ==
As of 1 July 2020.

Rider	Date of birth
Sean Bennett (USA)	March 31, 1996 (aged 23)
Alberto Bettiol (ITA)	October 29, 1993 (aged 26)
Stefan Bissegger (SUI)	September 13, 1998 (aged 21)
Jonathan Caicedo (ECU)	April 28, 1993 (aged 26)
Hugh Carthy (GBR)	July 9, 1994 (aged 25)
Simon Clarke (AUS)	July 18, 1986 (aged 33)
Magnus Cort (DEN)	January 16, 1993 (aged 26)
Lawson Craddock (USA)	February 20, 1992 (aged 27)
Mitchell Docker (AUS)	October 2, 1986 (aged 33)
Ruben Guerreiro (POR)	July 6, 1994 (aged 25)
Kristoffer Halvorsen (NOR)	April 13, 1996 (aged 23)
Sergio Higuita (COL)	August 1, 1997 (aged 22)
Moreno Hofland (NED)	August 31, 1991 (aged 28)
Alex Howes (USA)	January 1, 1988 (aged 32)
Tanel Kangert (EST)	March 11, 1987 (aged 32)

Rider	Date of birth
Jens Keukeleire (BEL)	November 23, 1988 (aged 31)
Sebastian Langeveld (NED)	January 17, 1985 (aged 34)
Daniel Martínez (COL)	April 25, 1996 (aged 23)
Lachlan Morton (AUS)	January 2, 1992 (aged 27)
Logan Owen (USA)	March 23, 1995 (aged 24)
Neilson Powless (USA)	September 3, 1996 (aged 23)
Jonas Rutsch (GER)	January 24, 1998 (aged 21)
Tom Scully (NZL)	January 14, 1990 (aged 29)
Rigoberto Urán (COL)	January 26, 1987 (aged 32)
Julius van den Berg (NED)	October 23, 1996 (aged 23)
Tejay van Garderen (USA)	August 12, 1988 (aged 31)
Sep Vanmarcke (BEL)	July 28, 1988 (aged 31)
Luis Villalobos (MEX)	June 26, 1998 (aged 21)
James Whelan (AUS)	July 11, 1996 (aged 23)
Michael Woods (CAN)	October 12, 1986 (aged 33)

Riders who joined the team for the 2020 season

Rider	2019 team
Stefan Bissegger	neo-pro (Swiss Racing Academy)
Magnus Cort	Astana
Ruben Guerreiro	Team Katusha–Alpecin
Kristoffer Halvorsen	Team INEOS
Jens Keukeleire	Lotto–Soudal
Neilson Powless	Team Jumbo–Visma
Jonas Rutsch	neo-pro (Team Lotto–Kern Haus)

Riders who left the team during or after the 2019 season

Rider	2020 team
Matti Breschel	Retired
Nathan Brown	Rally Cycling
Joe Dombrowski	UAE Team Emirates
Daniel McLay	Arkéa–Samsic
Sacha Modolo	Alpecin–Fenix
Taylor Phinney	Retired

== Season victories ==
Date	Race	Competition	Rider	Country	Location
6 February	Étoile de Bessèges, Stage 2	UCI Europe Tour	Magnus Cort (DEN)	France	Poulx
9 February	Étoile de Bessèges, Stage 4	UCI Europe Tour	Alberto Bettiol (ITA)	France	Alès
9 February	Étoile de Bessèges, Points classification	UCI Europe Tour	Magnus Cort (DEN)	France	
9 February	Étoile de Bessèges, Teams classification	UCI Europe Tour	(Note: The riders in the squad were Sean Bennett, Alberto Bettiol, Simon Clarke, Magnus Cort, Sebastian Langeveld, Logan Owen and Julius van den Berg.)	France	
11 February	Tour Colombia, Stage 1 (TTT)	UCI America Tour	(Note: The winning riders were Jonathan Caicedo, Lawson Craddock, Sergio Higuita, Daniel Martínez, Rigoberto Urán, and Tejay van Garderen.)	Colombia	Tunja
14 February	Tour Colombia, Stage 4	UCI America Tour	Sergio Higuita (COL)	Colombia	Santa Rosa de Viterbo
16 February	Tour Colombia, Stage 6	UCI America Tour	Daniel Martínez (COL)	Colombia	El Once/Alto del Verjón
16 February	Tour Colombia, Overall	UCI America Tour	Sergio Higuita (COL)	Colombia	
16 February	Tour Colombia, Young rider classification	UCI America Tour	Sergio Higuita (COL)	Colombia	
16 February	Tour Colombia, Teams classification	UCI America Tour	(Note: The riders in the squad were Jonathan Caicedo, Lawson Craddock, Sergio Higuita, Daniel Martínez, Rigoberto Urán, and Tejay van Garderen.)	Colombia	
1 March	Royal Bernard Drôme Classic	UCI Europe Tour; UCI ProSeries	Simon Clarke (AUS)	France	Livron-sur-Drôme
14 March	Paris–Nice, Young rider classification	UCI World Tour	Sergio Higuita (COL)	France	
16 August	Critérium du Dauphiné, Overall	UCI World Tour	Daniel Martínez (COL)	France	
16 August	Critérium du Dauphiné, Young rider classification	UCI World Tour	Daniel Martínez (COL)	France	
9 September	Tirreno–Adriatico, Stage 3	UCI World Tour	Michael Woods (CAN)	Italy	Saturnia
11 September	Tour de France, Stage 13	UCI World Tour	Daniel Martínez (COL)	France	Puy Mary
5 October	Giro d'Italia, Stage 3	UCI World Tour	Jonathan Caicedo (ECU)	Italy	Mount Etna
11 October	Giro d'Italia, Stage 9	UCI World Tour	Ruben Guerreiro (POR)	Italy	Roccaraso
25 October	Giro d'Italia, Mountains classification	UCI World Tour	Ruben Guerreiro (POR)	Italy	
27 October	Vuelta a España, Stage 7	UCI World Tour	Michael Woods (CAN)	Spain	Villanueva de Valdegovia
1 November	Vuelta a España, Stage 12	UCI World Tour	Hugh Carthy (GBR)	Spain	Alto de L'Angliru
6 November	Vuelta a España, Stage 16	UCI World Tour	Magnus Cort (DEN)	Spain	Ciudad Rodrigo

== National, Continental and World champions ==
Date	Discipline	Jersey	Rider	Country	Location
30 January	Colombian National Time Trial Championships		Daniel Martínez (COL)	Colombia	Pesca
2 February	Colombian National Road Race Championships		Sergio Higuita (COL)	Colombia	Tunja
