= 2020 UAE Team Emirates season =

UAE Team Emirates
- 2020 season
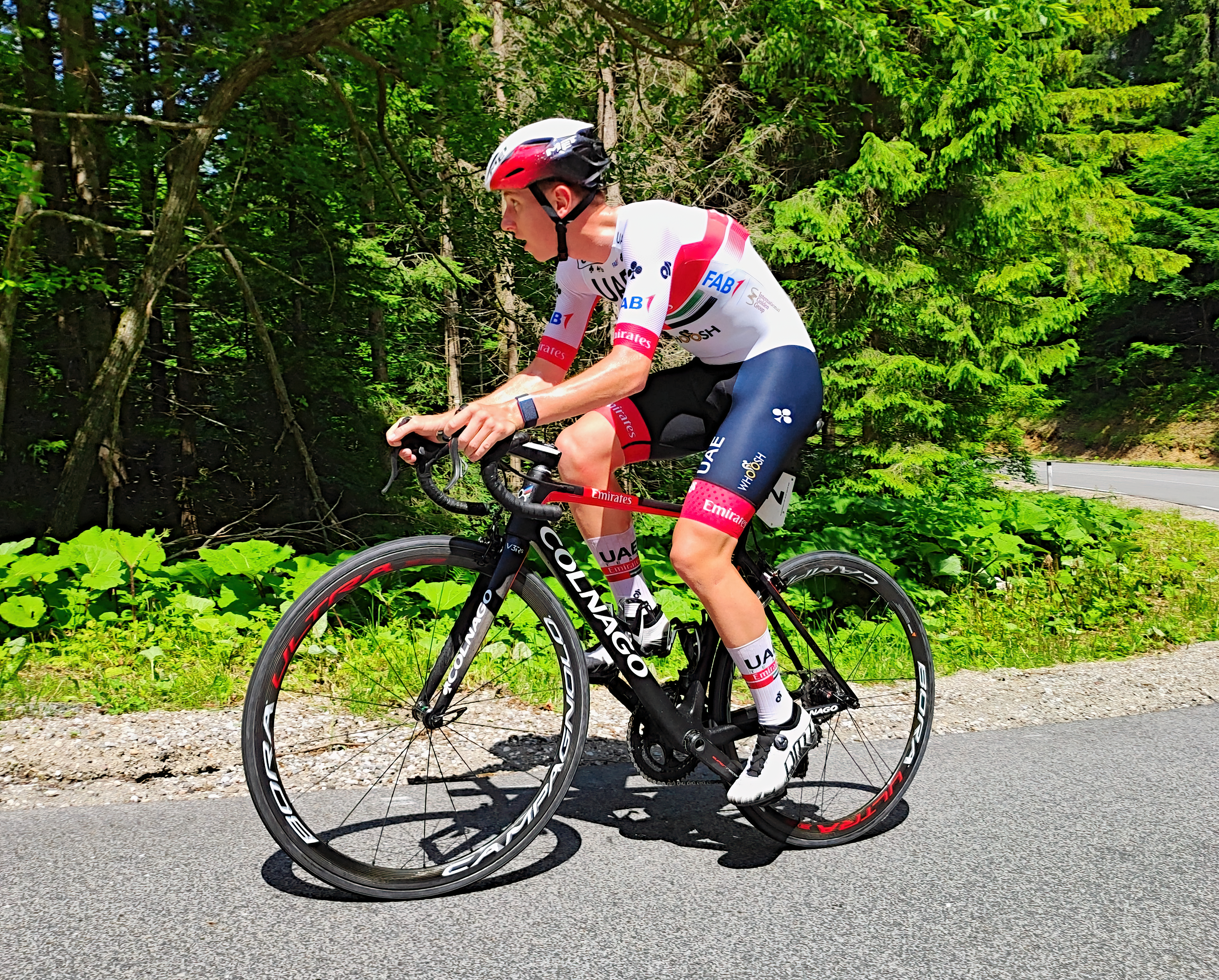
- Tadej Pogačar at the 2020 Slovenian Time Trial Championship
- UCI code: UAD
- Status: UCI WorldTeam
- Manager: Giuseppe Saronni
- Main sponsor(s): Emirates
- Based: United Arab Emirates
- Bicycles: Colnago
- Groupset: Campagnolo

Season victories
- One-day races: 2
- Stage race overall: 3
- Stage race stages: 24
- Grand Tours: 1
- National Championships: 4
- Most wins: Tadej Pogačar (8 wins)
- Best ranked rider: Tadej Pogačar
- Jersey

The 2020 season for UAE Team Emirates began in January at the Tour Down Under. The Team rode Colnago bicycles (Colnago V3Rs and Colnago C64) mostly with rim brakes, Alexander Kristoff also used disc brakes.

== Team roster ==
As of 23 November 2019.

Rider	Date of birth
Andres Camilo Ardila (COL)	2 June 1999 (aged 20)
Fabio Aru (ITA)	3 July 1990 (aged 29)
Mikkel Bjerg (DEN)	3 November 1998 (aged 21)
Tom Bohli (SUI)	17 January 1994 (aged 25)
Sven Erik Bystrøm (NOR)	21 January 1992 (aged 27)
Valerio Conti (ITA)	30 March 1993 (aged 26)
Alessandro Covi (ITA)	28 September 1998 (aged 21)
Rui Costa (POR)	5 October 1986 (aged 33)
David de la Cruz (ESP)	6 May 1989 (aged 30)
Joe Dombrowski (USA)	12 May 1991 (aged 28)
Davide Formolo (ITA)	25 September 1992 (aged 27)
Fernando Gaviria (COL)	19 August 1994 (aged 25)
Sergio Henao (COL)	10 December 1987 (aged 32)
Alexander Kristoff (NOR)	5 July 1987 (aged 32)
Vegard Stake Laengen (NOR)	7 February 1989 (aged 30)

Rider	Date of birth
Marco Marcato (ITA)	11 February 1984 (aged 35)
Brandon McNulty (USA)	2 April 1998 (aged 21)
Yousif Mirza (UAE)	8 October 1988 (aged 31)
Juan Sebastián Molano (COL)	4 November 1994 (aged 25)
Cristian Camilo Muñoz (COL)	20 March 1996 (aged 23)
Ivo Oliveira (POR)	5 September 1996 (aged 23)
Rui Oliveira (POR)	5 September 1996 (aged 23)
Jasper Philipsen (BEL)	2 March 1998 (aged 21)
Tadej Pogačar (SLO)	21 September 1998 (aged 21)
Jan Polanc (SLO)	6 May 1992 (aged 27)
Edward Ravasi (ITA)	5 June 1994 (aged 25)
Alexandr Riabushenko (BLR)	12 October 1995 (aged 24)
Maximiliano Richeze (ARG)	7 March 1983 (aged 36)
Oliviero Troia (ITA)	1 September 1994 (aged 25)
Diego Ulissi (ITA)	15 July 1989 (aged 30)

Riders who joined the team for the 2020 season

Rider	2019 team
Andres Camilo Ardila	Neo-pro
Mikkel Bjerg	Hagens Berman Axeon
Alessandro Covi	Team Colpack
David de la Cruz	Team INEOS
Joe Dombrowski	EF Education First
Davide Formolo	Bora–Hansgrohe
Brandon McNulty	Rally UHC Cycling
Maximiliano Richeze	Deceuninck–Quick-Step

Riders who left the team during or after the 2019 season

Rider	2020 team
Simone Consonni	Cofidis
Kristijan Đurasek	Banned/Fired
Roberto Ferrari	Retired
Dan Martin	Israel Start-Up Nation
Manuele Mori	Retired
Simone Petilli	Circus–Wanty Gobert
Rory Sutherland	Israel Start-Up Nation

== Season victories ==
Date	Race	Competition	Rider	Country	Location
25 January	Tour Down Under, Points classification	UCI World Tour	Jasper Philipsen (BEL)	Australia	
27 January	Vuelta a San Juan, Stage 2	UCI America Tour; UCI ProSeries	Fernando Gaviria (COL)	Argentina	Pocito
29 January	Vuelta a San Juan, Stage 4	UCI America Tour; UCI ProSeries	Fernando Gaviria (COL)	Argentina	Villa San Agustín
2 February	Vuelta a San Juan, Stage 7	UCI America Tour; UCI ProSeries	Fernando Gaviria (COL)	Argentina	San Juan
4 February	Saudi Tour, Stage 1	UCI Asia Tour	Rui Costa (POR)	Saudi Arabia	Jaww
6 February	Volta a la Comunitat Valenciana, Stage 2	UCI Europe Tour; UCI ProSeries	Tadej Pogačar (SLO)	Spain	Cullera
8 February	Volta a la Comunitat Valenciana, Stage 4	UCI Europe Tour; UCI ProSeries	Tadej Pogačar (SLO)	Spain	Altea (Sierra de Bernia)
9 February	Volta a la Comunitat Valenciana, Overall	UCI Europe Tour; UCI ProSeries	Tadej Pogačar (SLO)	Spain	
9 February	Volta a la Comunitat Valenciana, Young rider classification	UCI Europe Tour; UCI ProSeries	Tadej Pogačar (SLO)	Spain	
12 February	Tour Colombia, Stage 2	UCI America Tour	Juan Sebastián Molano (COL)	Colombia	Duitama
13 February	Tour Colombia, Stage 3	UCI America Tour	Juan Sebastián Molano (COL)	Colombia	Sogamoso
15 February	Tour Colombia, Stage 5	UCI America Tour	Juan Sebastián Molano (COL)	Colombia	Zipaquirá
16 February	Tour Colombia, Points classification	UCI America Tour	Juan Sebastián Molano (COL)	Colombia	
27 February	UAE Tour, Stage 5	UCI World Tour	Tadej Pogačar (SLO)	United Arab Emirates	Jebel Hafeet
27 February	UAE Tour, Young rider classification	UCI World Tour	Tadej Pogačar (SLO)	United Arab Emirates	
27 February	UAE Tour, Teams classification	UCI World Tour	(Note: The riders in the squad were Sven Erik Bystrøm, Davide Formolo, Fernando Gaviria, Tadej Pogačar, Maximiliano Richeze, Oliviero Troia and Diego Ulissi.)	United Arab Emirates	
29 July	Vuelta a Burgos, Stage 2	UCI Europe Tour; UCI ProSeries	Fernando Gaviria (COL)	Spain	Villadiego
14 August	Critérium du Dauphiné, Stage 3	UCI World Tour	Davide Formolo (ITA)	France	Saint-Martin-de-Belleville
16 August	Critérium du Dauphiné, Mountains classification	UCI World Tour	David de la Cruz (ESP)	France	
19 August	Tour du Limousin, Stage 2	UCI Europe Tour	Fernando Gaviria (COL)	France	Grand Etang de Saint-Estèph
20 August	Tour du Limousin, Stage 3	UCI Europe Tour	Jasper Philipsen (BEL)	France	Chamberet
29 August	Trofeo Matteotti	UCI Europe Tour	Valerio Conti (ITA)	Italy	Pescara
29 August	Tour de France, Stage 1	UCI World Tour	Alexander Kristoff (NOR)	France	Nice
6 September	Tour de France, Stage 9	UCI World Tour	Tadej Pogačar (SLO)	France	Laruns
13 September	Tour de France, Stage 15	UCI World Tour	Tadej Pogačar (SLO)	France	Grand Colombier
15 September	Tour de Luxembourg, Stage 1	UCI Europe Tour; UCI ProSeries	Diego Ulissi (ITA)	Luxembourg	Luxembourg City
16 September	Giro di Toscana	UCI Europe Tour	Fernando Gaviria (COL)	Italy	Pontedera
18 September	Tour de Luxembourg, Stage 4	UCI Europe Tour; UCI ProSeries	Diego Ulissi (ITA)	Luxembourg	Differdange
19 September	Tour de Luxembourg, Overall	UCI Europe Tour; UCI ProSeries	Diego Ulissi (ITA)	Luxembourg	
19 September	Tour de Luxembourg, Points classification	UCI Europe Tour; UCI ProSeries	Diego Ulissi (ITA)	Luxembourg	
19 September	Tour de France, Stage 20	UCI World Tour	Tadej Pogačar (SLO)	France	La Planche des Belles Filles
20 September	Tour de France, Overall	UCI World Tour	Tadej Pogačar (SLO)	France	
20 September	Tour de France, Mountains classification	UCI World Tour	Tadej Pogačar (SLO)	France	
20 September	Tour de France, Young rider classification	UCI World Tour	Tadej Pogačar (SLO)	France	
29 September	BinckBank Tour, Stage 1	UCI World Tour	Jasper Philipsen (BEL)	Belgium	Ardooie
4 October	Giro d'Italia, Stage 2	UCI World Tour	Diego Ulissi (ITA)	Italy	Agrigento
16 October	Giro d'Italia, Stage 13	UCI World Tour	Diego Ulissi (ITA)	Italy	Monselice
5 November	Vuelta a España, Stage 15	UCI World Tour	Jasper Philipsen (BEL)	Spain	Puebla de Sanabria

== National, Continental and World champions 2020 ==
Date	Race	Jersey	Rider	Country	Location
28 June	Slovenian National Time Trial Championships		Tadej Pogačar (SLO)	Slovenia	Pokljuka
14 August	Portuguese National Time Trial Championships		Ivo Oliveira (POR)	Portugal	Baltar
16 August	Portuguese National Road Race Championships		Rui Costa (POR)	Portugal	Gandra
23 August	Norwegian National Road Race Championships		Sven Erik Bystrøm (NOR)	Norway	Røyse
