= 2014 Tour of California =

2013–14 UCI America Tour

Race details
- Dates: May 11–18, 2014
- Stages: 8
- Distance: 710.2 miles (1,143 km)
- Winning time: 28h 22' 05"

Results
Jersey awarded to the overall winner	Winner	Bradley Wiggins (GBR)	(Team Sky)
	Second	Rohan Dennis (AUS)	(Garmin–Sharp)
	Third	Lawson Craddock (USA)	(Giant–Shimano)
Jersey awarded to the mountains classification winner	Mountains	Will Routley (CAN)	(Optum–Kelly Benefit Strategies)
Jersey awarded to the youth classification winner	Youth	Lawson Craddock (USA)	(Giant–Shimano)
Jersey awarded to the sprints classification winner	Sprints	Peter Sagan (SVK)	(Cannondale)
	Team	Garmin–Sharp	

The 2014 Amgen Tour of California was the ninth running of the Tour of California cycling stage race. It was held from May 11–18, and rated as a 2.HC event on the UCI America Tour. It began in Sacramento and finished in Thousand Oaks.

== Schedule ==
List of stages
Stage	Date	Course	Distance	Type	Winner
1	May 11	Sacramento to Sacramento	120.0 mi (193.1 km)	Hilly stage	Mark Cavendish (GBR)
2	May 12	Folsom	12.5 mi (20.1 km)	Individual time trial	Bradley Wiggins (GBR)
3	May 13	San Jose to Mount Diablo State Park	108.5 mi (174.6 km)	Mountain stage	Rohan Dennis (AUS)
4	May 14	Monterey to Cambria	102.6 mi (165.1 km)	Hilly stage	Will Routley (CAN)
5	May 15	Pismo Beach to Santa Barbara	107.4 mi (172.8 km)	Hilly stage	Taylor Phinney (USA)
6	May 16	Santa Clarita to Mountain High	94.4 mi (151.9 km)	Mountain stage	Esteban Chaves (COL)
7	May 17	Santa Clarita to Pasadena	88.7 mi (142.7 km)	Hilly stage	Peter Sagan (SVK)
8	May 18	Thousand Oaks to Thousand Oaks	76.1 mi (122.5 km)	Flat stage	Mark Cavendish (GBR)
	Total		710.2 mi (1,143 km)		

== Participating teams ==
Sixteen teams participated in the 2014 Tour of California, including nine UCI World Tour teams, three UCI Professional Continental teams, and four UCI Continental teams. They are:

UCI ProTeams
- Belkin Pro Cycling
- BMC Racing Team
- Cannondale
- Omega Pharma–Quick-Step
- Orica–GreenEDGE
- Giant–Shimano
- Garmin–Sharp
- Team Sky
- Trek Factory Racing
UCI Professional Continental Teams
- UnitedHealthcare
- Team Novo Nordisk
- NetApp–Endura
UCI Continental Teams
- Optum–Kelly Benefit Strategies
- Jamis–Hagens Berman
- Jelly Belly–Maxxis
- Bissell Development Team

The winner of the 2013 race, Tejay van Garderen, did not participate in this edition as he was preparing to ride the Tour de France. The main favorite for the overall classification is Bradley Wiggins. Other riders competing in the race are Taylor Phinney, Thor Hushovd, Janier Acevedo, Tom Boonen, Mark Cavendish, Jens Voigt, Adam Yates and Peter Sagan.

== Stages ==
=== Stage 1 ===
May 11, 2014 — Sacramento to Sacramento, 120.0 mi (193.1 km)

Stage 1 Result

	Rider	Team	Time
1	Mark Cavendish (GBR)	Omega Pharma–Quick-Step	4h 44' 17"
2	John Degenkolb (GER)	Giant–Shimano	s.t.
3	Moreno Hofland (NED)	Belkin Pro Cycling	s.t.
4	Peter Sagan (SVK)	Cannondale	s.t.
5	Danny van Poppel (NED)	Trek Factory Racing	s.t.
6	Guillaume Boivin (CAN)	Cannondale	s.t.
7	Eric Young (USA)	Optum–Kelly Benefit Strategies	s.t.
8	Matthew Goss (AUS)	Orica–GreenEDGE	s.t.
9	Taylor Phinney (USA)	BMC Racing Team	s.t.
10	John Murphy (USA)	UnitedHealthcare	s.t.

General Classification after Stage 1

	Rider	Team	Time
1	Mark Cavendish (GBR)	Omega Pharma–Quick-Step	4h 44' 07"
2	John Degenkolb (GER)	Giant–Shimano	+ 4"
3	Moreno Hofland (NED)	Belkin Pro Cycling	+ 6"
4	Tao Geoghegan Hart (GBR)	Bissell Development Team	+ 6"
5	Peter Sagan (SVK)	Cannondale	+ 10"
6	Danny van Poppel (NED)	Trek Factory Racing	+ 10"
7	Guillaume Boivin (CAN)	Cannondale	+ 10"
8	Eric Young (USA)	Optum–Kelly Benefit Strategies	+ 10"
9	Matthew Goss (AUS)	Orica–GreenEDGE	+ 10"
10	Taylor Phinney (USA)	BMC Racing Team	+ 10"

=== Stage 2 ===
May 12, 2014 — Folsom, 12.5 mi (20.1 km), individual time trial (ITT)

Stage 2 Result

	Rider	Team	Time
1	Bradley Wiggins (GBR)	Team Sky	23' 18"
2	Rohan Dennis (AUS)	Garmin–Sharp	+ 44"
3	Taylor Phinney (USA)	BMC Racing Team	+ 52"
4	Eloy Teruel (ESP)	Jamis–Hagens Berman	+ 1' 08"
5	Jesse Sergent (NZL)	Trek Factory Racing	+ 1' 11"
6	Jack Bobridge (AUS)	Belkin Pro Cycling	+ 1' 15"
7	Tiago Machado (POR)	NetApp–Endura	+ 1' 19"
8	Markel Irizar (ESP)	Trek Factory Racing	+ 1' 21"
9	Jens Voigt (GER)	Trek Factory Racing	+ 1' 24"
10	Chad Haga (USA)	Giant–Shimano	+ 1' 25"

General Classification after Stage 2

	Rider	Team	Time
1	Bradley Wiggins (GBR)	Team Sky	5h 07' 35"
2	Rohan Dennis (AUS)	Garmin–Sharp	+ 44"
3	Taylor Phinney (USA)	BMC Racing Team	+ 52"
4	Eloy Teruel (ESP)	Jamis–Hagens Berman	+ 1' 08"
5	Jesse Sergent (NZL)	Trek Factory Racing	+ 1' 11"
6	Tiago Machado (POR)	NetApp–Endura	+ 1' 19"
7	Markel Irizar (ESP)	Trek Factory Racing	+ 1' 21"
8	Jens Voigt (GER)	Trek Factory Racing	+ 1' 24"
9	Chad Haga (USA)	Giant–Shimano	+ 1' 25"
10	Tom Zirbel (USA)	Optum–Kelly Benefit Strategies	+ 1' 28"

=== Stage 3 ===
May 13, 2014 — San Jose to Mount Diablo State Park, 108.5 mi (174.6 km)

Stage 3 Result

	Rider	Team	Time
1	Rohan Dennis (AUS)	Garmin–Sharp	4h 56' 02"
2	Tiago Machado (POR)	NetApp–Endura	+ 6"
3	Lawson Craddock (USA)	Giant–Shimano	+ 8"
4	Adam Yates (GBR)	Orica–GreenEDGE	+ 11"
5	Janier Acevedo (COL)	Garmin–Sharp	+ 11"
6	Carter Jones (USA)	Optum–Kelly Benefit Strategies	+ 14"
7	Peter Stetina (USA)	BMC Racing Team	+ 14"
8	Esteban Chaves (COL)	Orica–GreenEDGE	+ 14"
9	Bradley Wiggins (GBR)	Team Sky	+ 20"
10	Matthew Busche (USA)	Trek Factory Racing	+ 29"

General Classification after Stage 3

	Rider	Team	Time
1	Bradley Wiggins (GBR)	Team Sky	10h 03' 57"
2	Rohan Dennis (AUS)	Garmin–Sharp	+ 24"
3	Tiago Machado (POR)	NetApp–Endura	+ 1' 05"
4	Lawson Craddock (USA)	Giant–Shimano	+ 1' 21"
5	Adam Yates (GBR)	Orica–GreenEDGE	+ 2' 10"
6	Peter Stetina (USA)	BMC Racing Team	+ 2' 24"
7	Matthew Busche (USA)	Trek Factory Racing	+ 2' 25"
8	Carter Jones (USA)	Optum–Kelly Benefit Strategies	+ 2' 27"
9	Laurens ten Dam (NED)	Belkin Pro Cycling	+ 2' 29"
10	Janier Acevedo (COL)	Garmin–Sharp	+ 2' 30"

=== Stage 4 ===
May 14, 2014 — Monterey to Cambria, 102.6 mi (165.1 km)

Stage 4 Result

	Rider	Team	Time
1	Will Routley (CAN)	Optum–Kelly Benefit Strategies	3h 48' 37"
2	Greg Daniel (USA)	Bissell Development Team	s.t.
3	Kevin De Mesmaeker (BEL)	Team Novo Nordisk	s.t.
4	Christopher Jones (USA)	UnitedHealthcare	s.t.
5	Matt Cooke (USA)	Jamis–Hagens Berman	s.t.
6	Jonathan Clarke (AUS)	UnitedHealthcare	+ 15"
7	Mark Cavendish (GBR)	Omega Pharma–Quick-Step	+ 1' 17"
8	Peter Sagan (SVK)	Cannondale	+ 1' 17"
9	Matthew Goss (AUS)	Orica–GreenEDGE	+ 1' 17"
10	Taylor Phinney (USA)	BMC Racing Team	+ 1' 17"

General Classification after Stage 4

	Rider	Team	Time
1	Bradley Wiggins (GBR)	Team Sky	13h 53' 51"
2	Rohan Dennis (AUS)	Garmin–Sharp	+ 28"
3	Tiago Machado (POR)	NetApp–Endura	+ 1' 09"
4	Lawson Craddock (USA)	Giant–Shimano	+ 1' 25"
5	Adam Yates (GBR)	Orica–GreenEDGE	+ 2' 14"
6	Peter Stetina (USA)	BMC Racing Team	+ 2' 28"
7	Matthew Busche (USA)	Trek Factory Racing	+ 2' 29"
8	Carter Jones (USA)	Optum–Kelly Benefit Strategies	+ 2' 31"
9	Laurens ten Dam (NED)	Belkin Pro Cycling	+ 2' 33"
10	Janier Acevedo (COL)	Garmin–Sharp	+ 2' 34"

=== Stage 5 ===
May 15, 2014 — Pismo Beach to Santa Barbara, 107.4 mi (172.8 km)

Stage 5 Result

	Rider	Team	Time
1	Taylor Phinney (USA)	BMC Racing Team	3h 59' 33"
2	Peter Sagan (SVK)	Cannondale	+ 12"
3	Matthew Goss (AUS)	Orica–GreenEDGE	+ 12"
4	Jasper Stuyven (BEL)	Trek Factory Racing	+ 12"
5	Kiel Reijnen (USA)	UnitedHealthcare	+ 12"
6	Lawson Craddock (USA)	Giant–Shimano	+ 12"
7	Thomas Damuseau (FRA)	Giant–Shimano	+ 12"
8	Greg Van Avermaet (BEL)	BMC Racing Team	+ 12"
9	Paul Voss (GER)	NetApp–Endura	+ 12"
10	Tiago Machado (POR)	NetApp–Endura	+ 12"

General Classification after Stage 5

	Rider	Team	Time
1	Bradley Wiggins (GBR)	Team Sky	17h 53' 36"
2	Rohan Dennis (AUS)	Garmin–Sharp	+ 28"
3	Tiago Machado (POR)	NetApp–Endura	+ 1' 09"
4	Lawson Craddock (USA)	Giant–Shimano	+ 1' 25"
5	Adam Yates (GBR)	Orica–GreenEDGE	+ 2' 14"
6	Peter Stetina (USA)	BMC Racing Team	+ 2' 28"
7	Matthew Busche (USA)	Trek Factory Racing	+ 2' 29"
8	Carter Jones (USA)	Optum–Kelly Benefit Strategies	+ 2' 31"
9	Laurens ten Dam (NED)	Belkin Pro Cycling	+ 2' 33"
10	Janier Acevedo (COL)	Garmin–Sharp	+ 2' 34"

=== Stage 6 ===
May 16, 2014 — Santa Clarita to Mountain High, 94.4 mi (151.9 km)

Stage 6 Result

	Rider	Team	Time
1	Esteban Chaves (COL)	Orica–GreenEDGE	4h 09' 13"
2	David de la Cruz (ESP)	NetApp–Endura	+ 13"
3	Tom Danielson (USA)	Garmin–Sharp	+ 41"
4	Adam Yates (GBR)	Orica–GreenEDGE	+ 53"
5	Bradley Wiggins (GBR)	Team Sky	+ 53"
6	Peter Stetina (USA)	BMC Racing Team	+ 55"
7	Rohan Dennis (AUS)	Garmin–Sharp	+ 55"
8	Jack Bobridge (AUS)	Belkin Pro Cycling	+ 1' 07"
9	George Bennett (NZL)	Cannondale	+ 1' 15"
10	Lawson Craddock (USA)	Giant–Shimano	+ 1' 16"

General Classification after Stage 6

	Rider	Team	Time
1	Bradley Wiggins (GBR)	Team Sky	22h 03' 42"
2	Rohan Dennis (AUS)	Garmin–Sharp	+ 30"
3	Lawson Craddock (USA)	Giant–Shimano	+ 1' 48"
4	Tiago Machado (POR)	NetApp–Endura	+ 2' 02"
5	Adam Yates (GBR)	Orica–GreenEDGE	+ 2' 14"
6	Peter Stetina (USA)	BMC Racing Team	+ 2' 30"
7	Esteban Chaves (COL)	Orica–GreenEDGE	+ 2' 39"
8	Laurens ten Dam (NED)	Belkin Pro Cycling	+ 3' 01"
9	Janier Acevedo (COL)	Garmin–Sharp	+ 3' 05"
10	David de la Cruz (ESP)	NetApp–Endura	+ 3' 06"

=== Stage 7 ===
May 17, 2014 — Santa Clarita to Pasadena, 88.7 mi (142.7 km)

Stage 7 Result

	Rider	Team	Time
1	Peter Sagan (SVK)	Cannondale	3h 24' 33"
2	Thor Hushovd (NOR)	BMC Racing Team	s.t.
3	Danny van Poppel (NED)	Trek Factory Racing	s.t.
4	Zak Dempster (AUS)	NetApp–Endura	s.t.
5	John Degenkolb (GER)	Giant–Shimano	s.t.
6	Matteo Trentin (ITA)	Omega Pharma–Quick-Step	s.t.
7	Jens Keukeleire (BEL)	Orica–GreenEDGE	s.t.
8	Nick van der Lijke (NED)	Belkin Pro Cycling	s.t.
9	Kiel Reijnen (USA)	UnitedHealthcare	s.t.
10	Taylor Phinney (USA)	BMC Racing Team	s.t.

General Classification after Stage 7

	Rider	Team	Time
1	Bradley Wiggins (GBR)	Team Sky	25h 28' 15"
2	Rohan Dennis (AUS)	Garmin–Sharp	+ 30"
3	Lawson Craddock (USA)	Giant–Shimano	+ 1' 48"
4	Tiago Machado (POR)	NetApp–Endura	+ 2' 02"
5	Adam Yates (GBR)	Orica–GreenEDGE	+ 2' 14"
6	Peter Stetina (USA)	BMC Racing Team	+ 2' 30"
7	Esteban Chaves (COL)	Orica–GreenEDGE	+ 2' 39"
8	Laurens ten Dam (NED)	Belkin Pro Cycling	+ 3' 01"
9	Janier Acevedo (COL)	Garmin–Sharp	+ 3' 05"
10	David de la Cruz (ESP)	NetApp–Endura	+ 3' 06"

=== Stage 8 ===
May 18, 2014 — Thousand Oaks to Thousand Oaks, 76.1 mi (122.5 km)

Stage 8 Result

	Rider	Team	Time
1	Mark Cavendish (GBR)	Omega Pharma–Quick-Step	2h 53' 50"
2	John Degenkolb (GER)	Giant–Shimano	s.t.
3	Peter Sagan (SVK)	Cannondale	s.t.
4	Matthew Goss (AUS)	Orica–GreenEDGE	s.t.
5	Danny van Poppel (NED)	Trek Factory Racing	s.t.
6	Thor Hushovd (NOR)	BMC Racing Team	s.t.
7	Lars Boom (NED)	Belkin Pro Cycling	s.t.
8	Zak Dempster (AUS)	NetApp–Endura	s.t.
9	Alex Howes (USA)	Garmin–Sharp	s.t.
10	Kiel Reijnen (USA)	UnitedHealthcare	s.t.

Final General Classification

	Rider	Team	Time
1	Bradley Wiggins (GBR)	Team Sky	28h 22' 05"
2	Rohan Dennis (AUS)	Garmin–Sharp	+ 30"
3	Lawson Craddock (USA)	Giant–Shimano	+ 1' 48"
4	Tiago Machado (POR)	NetApp–Endura	+ 2' 02"
5	Adam Yates (GBR)	Orica–GreenEDGE	+ 2' 14"
6	Peter Stetina (USA)	BMC Racing Team	+ 2' 30"
7	Esteban Chaves (COL)	Orica–GreenEDGE	+ 2' 39"
8	Laurens ten Dam (NED)	Belkin Pro Cycling	+ 3' 01"
9	Janier Acevedo (COL)	Garmin–Sharp	+ 3' 05"
10	David de la Cruz (ESP)	NetApp–Endura	+ 3' 06"

== Classification leadership table ==
In the 2014 Tour of California, 5 jerseys are awarded. For the general classification, calculated by adding the finishing times of the stages per cyclist, the leader receives a yellow jersey. This classification is considered the most important of the Tour of California, and the winner of the general classification will be considered the winner of the Tour of California.

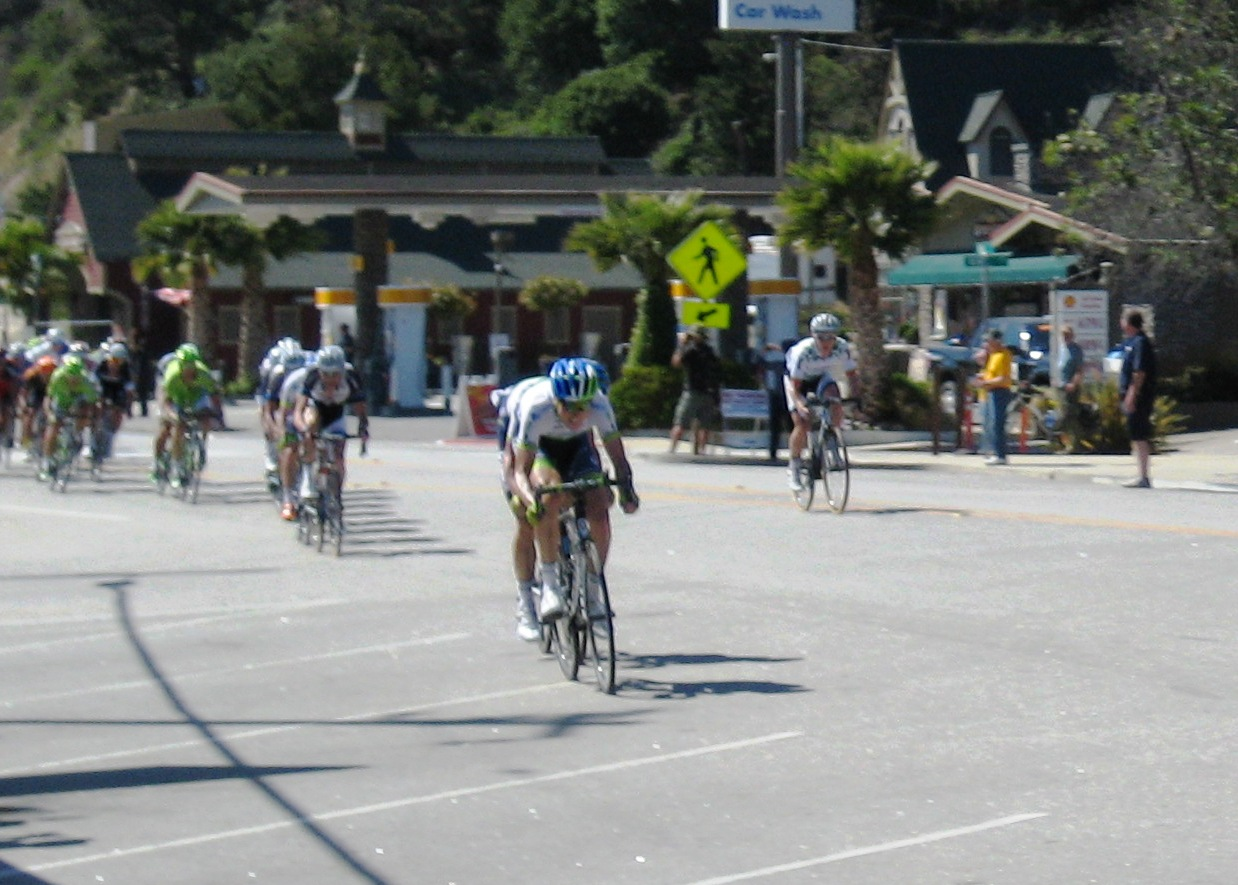
500 meters from the Stage 4 finish line in Cambria at the 2014 Tour

Additionally, there is also a sprints classification, akin to what is called the points classification in other races, which awards a green jersey. In the sprints classification, cyclists receive points for finishing in the top 15 in a stage. In addition, some points can be won in intermediate sprints.

There is also a mountains classification, which awards a Polka dots jersey. In the mountains classifications, points are won by reaching the top of a mountain before other cyclists. Each climb is categorized, either first, second, third, or fourth category, with more points available for the harder climbs.

There is also a youth classification. This classification is calculated the same way as the general classification, but only young cyclists (under 23) are included. The leader of the young rider classification receives a white and green jersey.

The last jersey is awarded to the most combative rider of a stage for him to wear on the next stage. It is generally awarded to a rider who attacks constantly or spends a lot of time in the breakaways. This jersey is blue, white and yellow.

There is also a classification for teams. In this classification, the times of the best three cyclists per stage are added, and the team with the lowest time is the leader.

Stage	Winner	General classification	Young rider classification	Mountains classification	Sprints classification	Most courageous rider	Teams classification
1	Mark Cavendish	Mark Cavendish	Tao Geoghegan Hart	Will Routley	Mark Cavendish	Charles Planet	Cannondale
2	Bradley Wiggins	Bradley Wiggins	Lawson Craddock	Will Routley	Mark Cavendish	not awarded	Trek Factory Racing
3	Rohan Dennis	Bradley Wiggins	Lawson Craddock	Will Routley	Mark Cavendish	Luis Enrique Lemus	Garmin–Sharp
4	Will Routley	Bradley Wiggins	Lawson Craddock	Will Routley	Will Routley	Jonathan Clarke	Garmin–Sharp
5	Taylor Phinney	Bradley Wiggins	Lawson Craddock	Will Routley	Peter Sagan	Taylor Phinney	Garmin–Sharp
6	Esteban Chaves	Bradley Wiggins	Lawson Craddock	Will Routley	Peter Sagan	Christopher Jones	Garmin–Sharp
7	Peter Sagan	Bradley Wiggins	Lawson Craddock	Will Routley	Peter Sagan	Ben King	Garmin–Sharp
8	Mark Cavendish	Bradley Wiggins	Lawson Craddock	Will Routley	Peter Sagan	Jack Bobridge	Garmin–Sharp
Final		Bradley Wiggins	Lawson Craddock	Will Routley	Peter Sagan	not awarded	Garmin–Sharp

== Classification standings ==
Legend
Yellow jersey	Denotes the leader of the General classification	Polka dot jersey	Denotes the leader of the Mountains classification
Green jersey	Denotes the leader of the Points classification	White jersey	Denotes the leader of the Young rider classification

== Media coverage ==
Television

- Europe: Eurosport
- United States: NBCSN
