= 2013 USA Pro Cycling Challenge =

2012–13 UCI America Tour
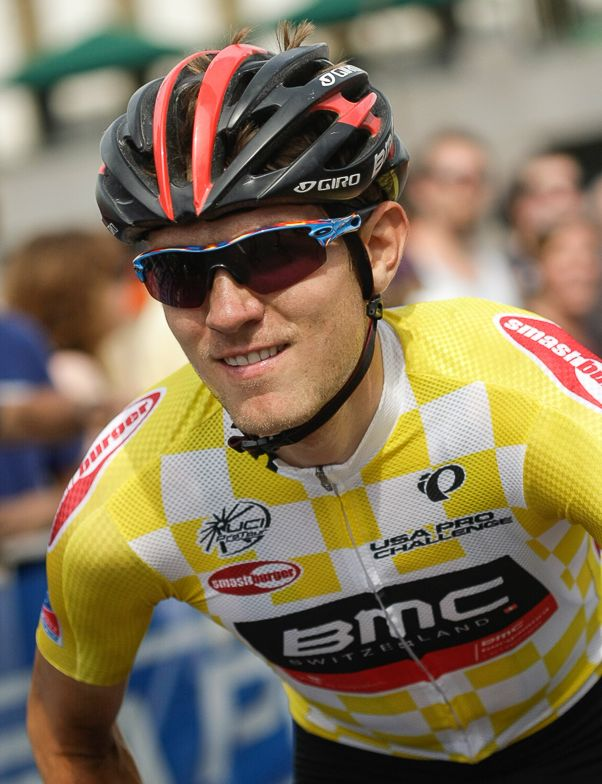
- Tejay van Garderen in the yellow jersey.

Race details
- Dates: August 19–25, 2013
- Stages: 7
- Distance: 573 mi (922 km)
- Winning time: 22h 38' 48"

Results
Jersey awarded to the overall winner	Winner	Tejay van Garderen (USA)	(BMC Racing Team)
	Second	Mathias Frank (SUI)	(BMC Racing Team)
	Third	Tom Danielson (USA)	(Garmin–Sharp)
Jersey awarded to the mountains classification winner	Mountains	Matt Cooke (USA)	(Jamis–Hagens Berman)
Jersey awarded to the young rider classification winner	Young rider	Lachlan Morton (AUS)	(Garmin–Sharp)
Jersey awarded to the sprints classification winner	Sprints	Peter Sagan (SVK)	(Cannondale)

The 2013 USA Pro Cycling Challenge is the third edition of the USA Pro Cycling Challenge stage race. Once again, the race was included on the UCI America Tour, with a UCI classification of 2.HC. As such, the race was only open to teams on the UCI Pro Tour, UCI Professional Continental and UCI Continental circuits. The race took place between August 19–25, 2013 as a seven-day, seven-stage race, traversing the state of Colorado. The 2013 USA Pro Cycling Challenge was one of six UCI-ranked stage races in the United States in 2013, and one of two (along with the 2013 Tour of California) that attracted multiple UCI ProTeams to compete.

American Tejay van Garderen of BMC Racing Team won the overall title after finishing lower on the podium the previous two years.

== Participating teams ==
In July, the USA Pro Cycling Challenge announced a sixteen-team field, made up of seven UCI ProTeams (up from six), four UCI Professional Continental Teams (down from six) and five UCI Continental Teams (up from four), thus giving the race a total of sixteen-teams (steady from 2012). In total, ten of the sixteen-teams that competed in 2013 were invited to return to this event, as well as Argos–Shimano, Bissell, and Jelly Belly–Kenda, who competed in the 2011 edition. UCI ProTeams Argos–Shimano, Cannondale, RadioShack–Leopard, Saxo–Tinkoff, and Team Sky are based in the Netherlands, Italy, Luxembourg, Denmark, and the United Kingdom, respectively; UCI Professional Continental Team Champion System is based in China, while its counterpart, Colombia is based in Columbia. The remaining nine teams are based in the United States.

UCI ProTeams

- Argos–Shimano
- BMC Racing Team *
- Cannondale *
- Garmin–Sharp *
- RadioShack–Leopard *
- Saxo–Tinkoff
- Team Sky

UCI Professional Continental Teams

- Champion System
- Colombia
- Team Novo Nordisk *
- UnitedHealthcare *

(* – participated in 2012)

UCI Continental Teams

- Bissell
- Bontrager Cycling Team *
- Jamis–Hagens Berman
- Jelly Belly–Kenda
- Optum–Kelly Benefit Strategies *

== Contenders ==
Defending champion, American Christian Vande Velde of Garmin–Sharp hoped to defend his title. Other contenders included Australian Rory Sutherland of Saxo–Tinkoff, Jamis–Hagens Berman's Janier Acevedo of Colombia, Irishman Philip Deignan of UnitedHealthcare, RadioShack–Leopard's George Bennett of New Zealand, and Americans Tom Danielson of Garmin–Sharp and Tejay van Garderen of BMC Racing Team. Garmin–Sharp's Lachlan Morton of Australia, and BMC Racing Team's Mathias Frank of Switzerland were both considered potential dark horses.

== Stages ==
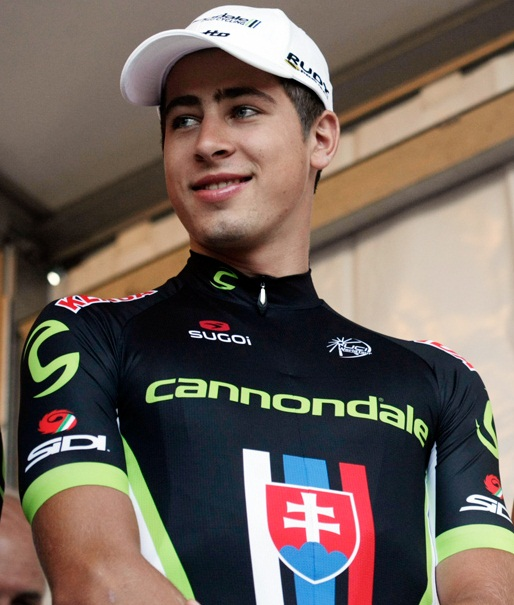
Peter Sagan won four stages.

Stage results
Stage	Date	Route	Terrain	Length	Winner
1	19 August	Aspen - Snowmass	Medium-mountain stage	64 mi (103 km)	Peter Sagan (SVK)
2	20 August	Aspen - Breckenridge	Mountain stage	126 mi (203 km)	Mathias Frank (SUI)
3	21 August	Breckenridge - Steamboat Springs	Medium-mountain stage	106 mi (171 km)	Peter Sagan (SVK)
4	22 August	Steamboat Springs - Beaver Creek	Mountain stage	103 mi (166 km)	Janier Acevedo (COL)
5	23 August	Vail - Vail	Individual time trial	10 mi (16 km)	Tejay van Garderen (USA)
6	24 August	Loveland - Fort Collins	Medium-mountain stage	117 mi (188 km)	Peter Sagan (SVK)
7	25 August	Denver - Denver	Flat Circuit	47 mi (76 km)	Peter Sagan (SVK)
	Total		573 mi (922 km)		

=== Stage 1 ===
August 19, 2013 — Aspen to Snowmass, 63.18 miles (101.68 km)

The opening circuit for the pro challenge will begin in Aspen, and consist of three 22 miles (35 km) laps and 3,080 feet (940 m) of climbing per lap.

Stage 1 Results

	Rider	Team	Time
1	Peter Sagan (SVK)	Cannondale	2h 26' 00"
2	Greg Van Avermaet (BEL)	BMC Racing Team	s.t.
3	Kiel Reijnen (USA)	UnitedHealthcare	s.t.
4	Tony Gallopin (FRA)	RadioShack–Leopard	s.t.
5	Tejay van Garderen (USA)	BMC Racing Team	s.t.
6	Damiano Caruso (ITA)	Cannondale	s.t.
7	Rory Sutherland (AUS)	Saxo–Tinkoff	s.t.
8	Lucas Euser (USA)	UnitedHealthcare	s.t.
9	Tom Danielson (USA)	Garmin–Sharp	s.t.
10	Chris Baldwin (USA)	Bissell	s.t.

General Classification after Stage 1

	Rider	Team	Time
1	Peter Sagan (SVK)	Cannondale	2h 26' 00"
2	Greg Van Avermaet (BEL)	BMC Racing Team	+ 0"
3	Kiel Reijnen (USA)	UnitedHealthcare	+ 0"
4	Tony Gallopin (FRA)	RadioShack–Leopard	+ 0"
5	Tejay van Garderen (USA)	BMC Racing Team	+ 0"
6	Damiano Caruso (ITA)	Cannondale	+ 0"
7	Rory Sutherland (AUS)	Saxo–Tinkoff	+ 0"
8	Lucas Euser (USA)	UnitedHealthcare	+ 0"
9	Tom Danielson (USA)	Garmin–Sharp	+ 0"
10	Chris Baldwin (USA)	Bissell	+ 0"

=== Stage 2 ===
August 20, 2013 — Aspen to Breckenridge, 126.06 miles (202.87 km)

Stage 2 Results

	Rider	Team	Time
1	Mathias Frank (SUI)	BMC Racing Team	5h 05' 19"
2	Lachlan Morton (AUS)	Garmin–Sharp	+ 3"
3	Peter Sagan (SVK)	Cannondale	+ 14"
4	Tejay van Garderen (USA)	BMC Racing Team	+ 14"
5	Lawson Craddock (USA)	Bontrager Cycling Team	+ 21"
6	Tom Danielson (USA)	Garmin–Sharp	+ 32"
7	Darwin Atapuma (COL)	Colombia	+ 33"
8	Damiano Caruso (ITA)	Cannondale	+ 44"
9	Michael Schär (SUI)	BMC Racing Team	+ 44"
10	George Bennett (NZL)	RadioShack–Leopard	+ 44"

General Classification after Stage 2

	Rider	Team	Time
1	Lachlan Morton (AUS)	Garmin–Sharp	7h 31' 22"
2	Mathias Frank (SUI)	BMC Racing Team	+ 2"
3	Peter Sagan (SVK)	Cannondale	+ 11"
4	Tejay van Garderen (USA)	BMC Racing Team	+ 11"
5	Lawson Craddock (USA)	Bontrager Cycling Team	+ 18"
6	Tom Danielson (USA)	Garmin–Sharp	+ 29"
7	Darwin Atapuma (COL)	Colombia	+ 35"
8	Damiano Caruso (ITA)	Cannondale	+ 41"
9	Chris Baldwin (USA)	Bissell	+ 41"
10	Gregory Brenes (CRC)	Colombia	+ 41"

=== Stage 3 ===
August 21, 2013 — Breckenridge to Steamboat Springs, 106 miles (171 km)

Stage 3 Results

	Rider	Team	Time
1	Peter Sagan (SVK)	Cannondale	4h 04' 18"
2	Luka Mezgec (SLO)	Argos–Shimano	s.t.
3	Ryan Anderson (CAN)	Cannondale	s.t.
4	Greg Van Avermaet (BEL)	BMC Racing Team	s.t.
5	Alessandro Bazzana (ITA)	UnitedHealthcare	s.t.
6	Edwin Ávila (COL)	Colombia	s.t.
7	Martijn Verschoor (NED)	Team Novo Nordisk	s.t.
8	Tony Gallopin (FRA)	RadioShack–Leopard	s.t.
9	Tanner Putt (USA)	Bontrager Cycling Team	s.t.
10	Damiano Caruso (ITA)	Cannondale	s.t.

General Classification after Stage 3

	Rider	Team	Time
1	Lachlan Morton (AUS)	Garmin–Sharp	11h 35' 40"
2	Mathias Frank (SUI)	BMC Racing Team	+ 2"
3	Peter Sagan (SVK)	Cannondale	+ 11"
4	Tejay van Garderen (USA)	BMC Racing Team	+ 11"
5	Lawson Craddock (USA)	Bontrager Cycling Team	+ 18"
6	Tom Danielson (USA)	Garmin–Sharp	+ 29"
7	Darwin Atapuma (COL)	Colombia	+ 35"
8	Damiano Caruso (ITA)	Cannondale	+ 41"
9	Greg Van Avermaet (BEL)	BMC Racing Team	+ 41"
10	Tony Gallopin (FRA)	RadioShack–Leopard	+ 41"

=== Stage 4 ===
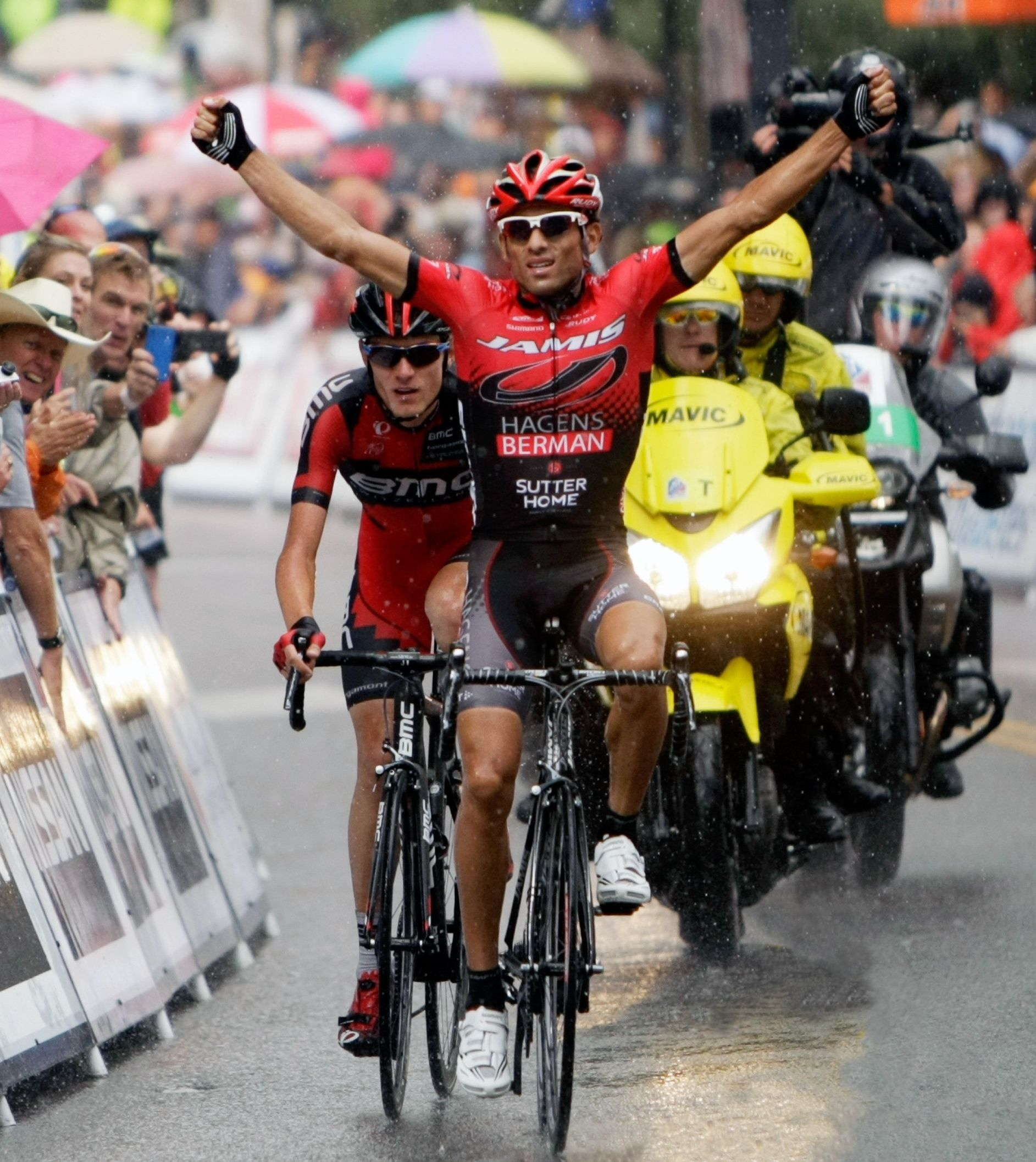
Janier Acevedo won Stage 4.

August 22, 2013 — Steamboat Springs to Beaver Creek, 103 miles (166 km)

Stage 4 Results

	Rider	Team	Time
1	Janier Acevedo (COL)	Jamis–Hagens Berman	4h 09' 08"
2	Tejay van Garderen (USA)	BMC Racing Team	s.t.
3	Mathias Frank (SUI)	BMC Racing Team	+ 13"
4	Tom Danielson (USA)	Garmin–Sharp	+ 22"
5	Gregory Brenes (CRC)	Champion System	+ 1' 07"
6	Damiano Caruso (ITA)	Cannondale	+ 1' 28"
7	Josh Edmondson (GBR)	Team Sky	+ 1' 28"
8	Lachlan Morton (AUS)	Garmin–Sharp	+ 1' 28"
9	Michael Schär (SUI)	BMC Racing Team	+ 1' 28"
10	Darwin Atapuma (COL)	Colombia	+ 1' 28"

General Classification after Stage 4

	Rider	Team	Time
1	Tejay van Garderen (USA)	BMC Racing Team	15h 49' 59"
2	Mathias Frank (SUI)	BMC Racing Team	+ 4"
3	Janier Acevedo (COL)	Jamis–Hagens Berman	+ 30"
4	Tom Danielson (USA)	Garmin–Sharp	+ 40"
5	Lachlan Morton (AUS)	Garmin–Sharp	+ 1' 17"
6	Gregory Brenes (CRC)	Champion System	+ 1' 37"
7	Darwin Atapuma (COL)	Colombia	+ 1' 52"
8	Damiano Caruso (ITA)	Cannondale	+ 1' 58"
9	Rory Sutherland (AUS)	Saxo–Tinkoff	+ 1' 58"
10	Lucas Euser (USA)	UnitedHealthcare	+ 1' 58"

=== Stage 5 ===
August 23, 2013 — Vail to Vail, 10 miles (16 km)

Stage 5 Results

	Rider	Team	Time
1	Tejay van Garderen (USA)	BMC Racing Team	25' 01"
2	Andrew Talansky (USA)	Garmin–Sharp	+ 4"
3	Tom Danielson (USA)	Garmin–Sharp	+ 1' 02"
4	Steve Cummings (GBR)	BMC Racing Team	+ 1' 04"
5	Larry Warbasse (USA)	BMC Racing Team	+ 1' 12"
6	Tobias Ludvigsson (SWE)	Argos–Shimano	+ 1' 16"
7	Kanstantsin Sivtsov (BLR)	Team Sky	+ 1' 16"
8	Lachlan Morton (AUS)	Garmin–Sharp	+ 1' 17"
9	Christian Vande Velde (USA)	Garmin–Sharp	+ 1' 24"
10	Mathias Frank (SWI)	BMC Racing Team	+ 1' 26"

General Classification after Stage 5

	Rider	Team	Time
1	Tejay van Garderen (USA)	BMC Racing Team	16h 10' 00"
2	Mathias Frank (SUI)	BMC Racing Team	+ 1' 30"
3	Tom Danielson (USA)	Garmin–Sharp	+ 1' 42"
4	Janier Acevedo (COL)	Jamis–Hagens Berman	+ 2' 10"
5	Lachlan Morton (AUS)	Garmin–Sharp	+ 2' 34"
6	Gregory Brenes (CRC)	Champion System	+ 3' 35"
7	Lawson Craddock (USA)	Bontrager Cycling Team	+ 3' 42"
8	George Bennett (NZL)	RadioShack–Leopard	+ 3' 58"
9	Rory Sutherland (AUS)	Saxo–Tinkoff	+ 4' 11"
10	Philip Deignan (IRL)	UnitedHealthcare	+ 4' 12"

=== Stage 6 ===
August 24, 2013 — Loveland to Fort Collins, 117.17 miles (188.57 km)

Stage 6 Results

	Rider	Team	Time
1	Peter Sagan (SVK)	Cannondale	4h 01' 33"
2	Luka Mezgec (SLO)	Argos–Shimano	s.t.
3	Greg Van Avermaet (BEL)	BMC Racing Team	s.t.
4	Edwin Ávila (COL)	Colombia	s.t.
5	Alessandro Bazzana (ITA)	UnitedHealthcare	s.t.
6	Andrea Peron (ITA)	Team Novo Nordisk	s.t.
7	Rory Sutherland (AUS)	Saxo–Tinkoff	s.t.
8	Fred Rodriguez (USA)	Jelly Belly–Kenda	s.t.
9	Michael Olsson (SWE)	Argos–Shimano	s.t.
10	Robinson Chalapud (COL)	Colombia	s.t.

General Classification after Stage 6

	Rider	Team	Time
1	Tejay van Garderen (USA)	BMC Racing Team	20h 11' 33"
2	Mathias Frank (SUI)	BMC Racing Team	+ 1' 30"
3	Tom Danielson (USA)	Garmin–Sharp	+ 1' 42"
4	Janier Acevedo (COL)	Jamis–Hagens Berman	+ 2' 10"
5	Lachlan Morton (AUS)	Garmin–Sharp	+ 2' 34"
6	Gregory Brenes (CRC)	Champion System	+ 3' 25"
7	Lawson Craddock (USA)	Bontrager Cycling Team	+ 3' 42"
8	George Bennett (NZL)	RadioShack–Leopard	+ 3' 58"
9	Rory Sutherland (AUS)	Saxo–Tinkoff	+ 4' 11"
10	Philip Deignan (IRL)	UnitedHealthcare	+ 4' 12"

=== Stage 7 ===
August 25, 2013 — Denver to Denver, 47.1 miles (75.8 km)

Stage 7 Results

	Rider	Team	Time
1	Peter Sagan (SVK)	Cannondale	2h 27' 15"
2	Ryan Anderson (CAN)	Optum–Kelly Benefit Strategies	s.t.
3	Alessandro Bazzana (ITA)	UnitedHealthcare	s.t.
4	Luka Mezgec (SLO)	Argos–Shimano	s.t.
5	Greg Van Avermaet (BEL)	BMC Racing Team	s.t.
6	Edwin Ávila (COL)	Colombia	s.t.
7	Tanner Putt (USA)	Bontrager Cycling Team	s.t.
8	Andrea Peron (ITA)	Team Novo Nordisk	s.t.
9	Philip Deignan (IRL)	UnitedHealthcare	s.t.
10	Michael Schär (SWI)	BMC Racing Team	s.t.

General Classification after Stage 7

	Rider	Team	Time
1	Tejay van Garderen (USA)	BMC Racing Team	22h 38' 48"
2	Mathias Frank (SUI)	BMC Racing Team	+ 1' 30"
3	Tom Danielson (USA)	Garmin–Sharp	+ 1' 42"
4	Janier Acevedo (COL)	Jamis–Hagens Berman	+ 2' 10"
5	Lachlan Morton (AUS)	Garmin–Sharp	+ 2' 34"
6	Gregory Brenes (CRC)	Champion System	+ 3' 25"
7	Lawson Craddock (USA)	Bontrager Cycling Team	+ 3' 42"
8	George Bennett (NZL)	RadioShack–Leopard	+ 3' 58"
9	Rory Sutherland (AUS)	Saxo–Tinkoff	+ 4' 11"
10	Philip Deignan (IRL)	UnitedHealthcare	+ 4' 12"

== Classification leadership ==
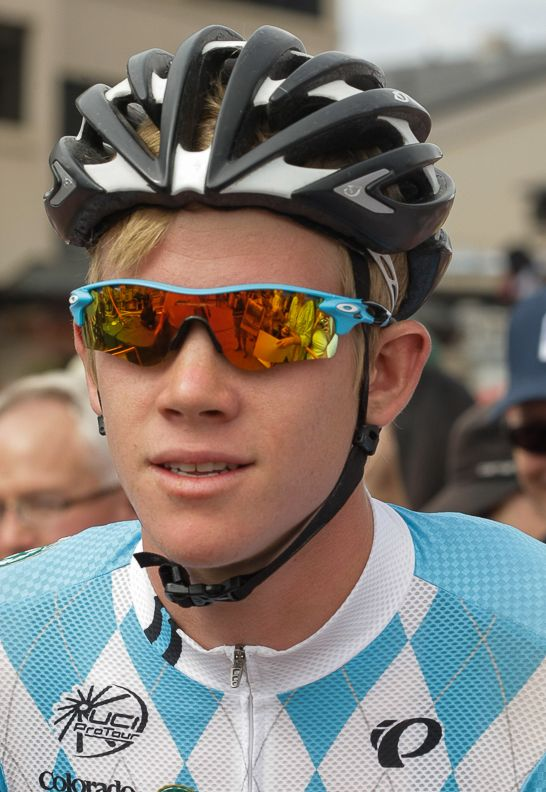
Lawson Craddock wore the jersey for the best young rider on loan from Lachlan Morton.

In the 2013 USA Pro Cycling Challenge, five jerseys are awarded. For the general classification, calculated by adding the finishing times of the stages per cyclist, the leader receives a yellow jersey. This classification is considered the most important of the USA Pro Cycling Challenge, and the winner of the general classification will be considered the winner of the event.

Additionally, there is also a sprints classification, akin to what is called the points classification in other races, which awards a green jersey. Points are gathered at sprint line performances as well as finishing the stage in the top-fifteen places.

There is also a mountains classification, which awards a red jersey. In the mountains classifications, points are won by reaching the top of a mountain before other cyclists. Each climb is categorized, either first, second, third, or fourth category, with more points available for the harder climbs.

There is also a youth classification. This classification is calculated the same way as the general classification, but only young cyclists (under 23) are included. The leader of the young rider classification receives a white jersey.

The last jersey is awarded to the most aggressive rider of a stage for him to wear on the next stage. It is generally awarded to a rider who attacks constantly or spends a lot of time in the breakaways. This jersey is orange.

There is also a classification for teams. In this classification, the times of the best three cyclists per stage are added, and the team with the lowest time is the leader.

Stage	Winner	General classification	Sprints classification	Mountains classification	Young rider classification	Most Aggressive	Team classification
1	Peter Sagan	Peter Sagan	Peter Sagan	Matt Cooke	Peter Sagan	Peter Sagan	RadioShack–Leopard
2	Mathias Frank	Lachlan Morton	Peter Sagan	Matt Cooke	Lachlan Morton	Mathias Frank	BMC Racing Team
3	Peter Sagan	Lachlan Morton	Peter Sagan	Matt Cooke	Lachlan Morton	Jens Voigt	BMC Racing Team
4	Janier Acevedo	Tejay van Garderen	Peter Sagan	Matt Cooke	Lachlan Morton	Michael Rogers	BMC Racing Team
5	Tejay van Garderen	Tejay van Garderen	Peter Sagan	Matt Cooke	Lachlan Morton	Andrew Talansky	BMC Racing Team
6	Peter Sagan	Tejay van Garderen	Peter Sagan	Matt Cooke	Lachlan Morton	Simon Geschke	BMC Racing Team
7	Peter Sagan	Tejay van Garderen	Peter Sagan	Matt Cooke	Lachlan Morton	Ben King	BMC Racing Team
Final		Tejay van Garderen	Peter Sagan	Matt Cooke	Lachlan Morton	Ben King	BMC Racing Team

== Classification standings ==
Legend
Yellow jersey	Denotes the leader of the General classification	Red jersey	Denotes the leader of the Mountains classification
Green jersey	Denotes the leader of the Points classification	White jersey	Denotes the leader of the Young rider classification

=== General classification ===
	Rider	Team	Time
1	Tejay van Garderen (USA)	BMC Racing Team	22h 38' 48"
2	Mathias Frank (SUI)	BMC Racing Team	+ 1' 30"
3	Tom Danielson (USA)	Garmin–Sharp	+ 1' 42"
4	Janier Acevedo (COL)	Jamis–Hagens Berman	+ 2' 10"
5	Lachlan Morton (AUS)	Garmin–Sharp	+ 2' 34"
6	Gregory Brenes (CRC)	Champion System	+ 3' 25"
7	Lawson Craddock (USA)	Bontrager Cycling Team	+ 3' 42"
8	George Bennett (NZL)	RadioShack–Leopard	+ 3' 58"
9	Rory Sutherland (AUS)	Saxo–Tinkoff	+ 4' 11"
10	Philip Deignan (IRL)	UnitedHealthcare	+ 4' 12"

=== Points classification ===
	Rider	Team	Points
1	Peter Sagan (SVK)	Cannondale	70
2	Greg Van Avermaet (BEL)	BMC Racing Team	40
3	Luka Mezgec (SLO)	Argos–Shimano	31
4	Alessandro Bazzana (ITA)	UnitedHealthcare	22
5	Ryan Anderson (CAN)	Optum–Kelly Benefit Strategies	22
6	Edwin Ávila (COL)	Colombia	17
7	Mathias Frank (SUI)	BMC Racing Team	15
8	Tejay van Garderen (USA)	BMC Racing Team	13
9	Lachlan Morton (AUS)	Garmin–Sharp	12
10	Tony Gallopin (FRA)	RadioShack–Leopard	10

=== King of the Mountains classification ===
	Rider	Team	Points
1	Matt Cooke (USA)	Jamis–Hagens Berman	46
2	Mathias Frank (SWI)	BMC Racing Team	30
3	Tyler Wren (USA)	Jamis–Hagens Berman	25
4	Lachlan Morton (AUS)	Garmin–Sharp	22
5	Tejay van Garderen (USA)	BMC Racing Team	20
6	Tom Danielson (USA)	Garmin–Sharp	19
7	Jens Voigt (GER)	RadioShack–Leopard	18
8	Janier Acevedo (COL)	Jamis–Hagens Berman	16
9	Michael Rogers (AUS)	Saxo–Tinkoff	16
10	Lawson Craddock (USA)	Bontrager Cycling Team	13

=== Young Riders classification ===
	Rider	Team	Time
1	Lachlan Morton (AUS)	Garmin–Sharp	20h 14' 07"
3	Lawson Craddock (USA)	Bontrager Cycling Team	+ 1' 08"
2	George Bennett (NZL)	RadioShack–Leopard	+ 1' 24"
4	Nathan Wilson (USA)	Bontrager Cycling Team	+ 2' 26"
5	James Oram (NZL)	Bontrager Cycling Team	+ 3' 11"
6	Jesper Hansen (DEN)	Saxo–Tinkoff	+ 7' 56"
7	Larry Warbasse (USA)	BMC Racing Team	+ 8' 19"
8	Tobias Ludvigsson (SWE)	Argos–Shimano	+ 16' 51"
9	Peter Sagan (SVK)	Cannondale	+ 17' 12"
10	Davide Villella (ITA)	Cannondale	+ 21' 12"

=== Team classification ===
	Team	Time
1	BMC Racing Team	60h 38′ 57″
2	Garmin–Sharp	+ 5' 30″
3	Bontrager Cycling Team	+ 9' 46″
4	Champion System	+ 14' 50″
5	Saxo–Tinkoff	+ 15' 51″
6	RadioShack–Leopard	+ 17' 21″
7	Colombia	+ 17' 48″
8	UnitedHealthcare	+ 20' 22″
9	Cannondale	+ 25' 44″
10	Jelly Belly–Kenda	+ 37' 06″
