= 2020 Paris–Nice =

Cycling race

2020 UCI World Tour, race 5 of 21

Race details
- Dates: 8–14 March 2020 (Note: The race was initially scheduled to be held between 8–15 March 2020, but was shortened due to the COVID-19 pandemic.)
- Stages: 7 (Note: The race was initially due to have 8 stages, but the last stage was cancelled due to the COVID-19 pandemic.)
- Distance: 1,122.1 km (697.2 mi)
- Winning time: 27h 14' 23"

Results
Jersey awarded to the overall winner	Winner	Maximilian Schachmann (GER)	(Bora–Hansgrohe)
	Second	Tiesj Benoot (BEL)	(Team Sunweb)
	Third	Sergio Higuita (COL)	(EF Pro Cycling)
Jersey awarded to the points classification winner	Points	Tiesj Benoot (BEL)	(Team Sunweb)
Jersey awarded to the mountains classification winner	Mountains	Nicolas Edet (FRA)	(Cofidis)
Jersey awarded to the youth classification winner	Youth	Sergio Higuita (COL)	(EF Pro Cycling)
	Team	Team Sunweb	

The 2020 Paris–Nice was a road cycling stage race that was held between 8 and 14 March 2020 in France. It was the 78th edition of Paris–Nice and the fifth race of the 2020 UCI World Tour. The race was shortened on 13 March, removing the final stage, due to concerns over the COVID-19 pandemic. The global health situation had already led to the withdrawal of several teams before and during the race.

German rider Maximilian Schachmann won the overall classification after the race was ended following the seventh stage. Belgian Tiesj Benoot was second, Colombian Sergio Higuita third.

== Teams ==
Seventeen teams participated in the race, including twelve UCI WorldTour teams and five UCI Professional Continental teams. Several teams originally scheduled to take part in the race withdrew due to the COVID-19 pandemic, including Astana, CCC Team, Mitchelton–Scott, Movistar Team, Team Ineos, Team Jumbo–Visma, and UAE Team Emirates. During the race, many riders and teams chose to pull out, including Bahrain–McLaren, Israel Start-Up Nation, and defending world road race champion Mads Pedersen, due to various coronavirus-related reasons. As a result, of the 136 riders who started the race, only 61 riders finished.

UCI WorldTeams

- AG2R La Mondiale
- Bahrain–McLaren
- Bora–Hansgrohe
- Cofidis
- Deceuninck–Quick-Step
- EF Pro Cycling
- Groupama–FDJ
- Israel Start-Up Nation
- Lotto–Soudal
- NTT Pro Cycling
- Team Sunweb
- Trek–Segafredo

UCI Professional Continental teams

- Arkéa–Samsic
- B&B Hotels–Vital Concept
- Circus–Wanty Gobert
- Nippo–Delko–One Provence
- Total Direct Énergie

== Route ==
Stage characteristics and winners
Stage	Date	Course	Distance	Type	Winner
1	8 March	Plaisir to Plaisir	154 km (96 mi)	Hilly stage	Maximilian Schachmann (GER)
2	9 March	Chevreuse to Chalette-sur-Loing	166.5 km (103.5 mi)	Flat stage	Giacomo Nizzolo (ITA)
3	10 March	Chalette-sur-Loing to La Châtre	212.5 km (132.0 mi)	Flat stage	Iván García (ESP)
4	11 March	Saint-Amand-Montrond to Saint-Amand-Montrond	15.1 km (9.4 mi)	Individual time trial	Søren Kragh Andersen (DEN)
5	12 March	Gannat to La Côte-Saint-André	227 km (141 mi)	Flat stage	Niccolò Bonifazio (ITA)
6	13 March	Sorgues to Apt	160.5 km (99.7 mi)	Hilly stage	Tiesj Benoot (BEL)
7	14 March	Nice to Valdeblore La Colmiane	166.5 km (103.5 mi)	Mountain stage	Nairo Quintana (COL)
~~8~~	~~15 March~~	~~Nice to Nice~~	~~113.5 km (70.5 mi)~~	~~Medium mountain stage~~	Stage cancelled (Note: Stage cancelled by ASO due to the COVID-19 pandemic.)
Total		~~1,235.6 km (767.8 mi)~~ 1,122.1 km (697.2 mi)			

== Stages ==
=== Stage 1 ===
8 March 2020 — Plaisir to Plaisir, 154 km (96 mi)

Stage 1 Result
Rank	Rider	Team	Time
1	Maximilian Schachmann (GER)	Bora–Hansgrohe	3h 32' 19"
2	Dylan Teuns (BEL)	Bahrain–McLaren	+ 0"
3	Tiesj Benoot (BEL)	Team Sunweb	+ 0"
4	Julian Alaphilippe (FRA)	Deceuninck–Quick-Step	+ 3"
5	Cees Bol (NED)	Team Sunweb	+ 15"
6	Nils Politt (GER)	Israel Start-Up Nation	+ 15"
7	Giacomo Nizzolo (ITA)	NTT Pro Cycling	+ 15"
8	Sergio Higuita (COL)	EF Pro Cycling	+ 15"
9	Felix Großschartner (AUT)	Bora–Hansgrohe	+ 15"
10	Yves Lampaert (BEL)	Deceuninck–Quick-Step	+ 15"

General classification after Stage 1
Rank	Rider	Team	Time
1	Maximilian Schachmann (GER)	Bora–Hansgrohe	3h 32' 09"
2	Tiesj Benoot (BEL)	Team Sunweb	+ 2"
3	Dylan Teuns (BEL)	Bahrain–McLaren	+ 4"
4	Julian Alaphilippe (FRA)	Deceuninck–Quick-Step	+ 7"
5	Pello Bilbao (ESP)	Bahrain–McLaren	+ 24"
6	Rudy Molard (FRA)	Groupama–FDJ	+ 24"
7	Cees Bol (NED)	Team Sunweb	+ 25"
8	Nils Politt (GER)	Israel Start-Up Nation	+ 25"
9	Giacomo Nizzolo (ITA)	NTT Pro Cycling	+ 25"
10	Sergio Higuita (COL)	EF Pro Cycling	+ 25"

=== Stage 2 ===
9 March 2020 — Chevreuse to Chalette-sur-Loing, 166.5 km (103.5 mi)

Stage 2 Result
Rank	Rider	Team	Time
1	Giacomo Nizzolo (ITA)	NTT Pro Cycling	3h 49' 57"
2	Pascal Ackermann (GER)	Bora–Hansgrohe	+ 0"
3	Jasper Stuyven (BEL)	Trek–Segafredo	+ 0"
4	Nils Politt (GER)	Israel Start-Up Nation	+ 0"
5	Sergio Higuita (COL)	EF Pro Cycling	+ 0"
6	Mads Würtz Schmidt (DEN)	Israel Start-Up Nation	+ 0"
7	Vincenzo Nibali (ITA)	Trek–Segafredo	+ 3"
8	Maximilian Schachmann (GER)	Bora–Hansgrohe	+ 3"
9	Felix Großschartner (AUT)	Bora–Hansgrohe	+ 3"
10	Krists Neilands (LAT)	Israel Start-Up Nation	+ 3"

General classification after Stage 2
Rank	Rider	Team	Time
1	Maximilian Schachmann (GER)	Bora–Hansgrohe	7h 22' 06"
2	Giacomo Nizzolo (ITA)	NTT Pro Cycling	+ 15"
3	Jasper Stuyven (BEL)	Trek–Segafredo	+ 21"
4	Sergio Higuita (COL)	EF Pro Cycling	+ 23"
5	Nils Politt (GER)	Israel Start-Up Nation	+ 25"
6	Mads Würtz Schmidt (DEN)	Israel Start-Up Nation	+ 25"
7	Felix Großschartner (AUT)	Bora–Hansgrohe	+ 28"
8	Krists Neilands (LAT)	Israel Start-Up Nation	+ 28"
9	Vincenzo Nibali (ITA)	Trek–Segafredo	+ 28"
10	Tiesj Benoot (BEL)	Team Sunweb	+ 38"

=== Stage 3 ===
10 March 2020 — Chalette-sur-Loing to La Châtre, 212.5 km (132.0 mi)

Stage 3 Result
Rank	Rider	Team	Time
1	Iván García (ESP)	Bahrain–McLaren	5h 49' 55"
2	Peter Sagan (SVK)	Bora–Hansgrohe	+ 0"
3	Andrea Pasqualon (ITA)	Circus–Wanty Gobert	+ 0"
4	Cees Bol (NED)	Team Sunweb	+ 0"
5	Nacer Bouhanni (FRA)	Arkéa–Samsic	+ 0"
6	Rudy Barbier (FRA)	Israel Start-Up Nation	+ 0"
7	Anthony Turgis (FRA)	Total Direct Énergie	+ 0"
8	Giacomo Nizzolo (ITA)	NTT Pro Cycling	+ 0"
9	Mads Würtz Schmidt (DEN)	Israel Start-Up Nation	+ 0"
10	Oliver Naesen (BEL)	AG2R La Mondiale	+ 0"

General classification after Stage 3
Rank	Rider	Team	Time
1	Maximilian Schachmann (GER)	Bora–Hansgrohe	13h 12' 01"
2	Giacomo Nizzolo (ITA)	NTT Pro Cycling	+ 13"
3	Jasper Stuyven (BEL)	Trek–Segafredo	+ 24"
4	Mads Würtz Schmidt (DEN)	Israel Start-Up Nation	+ 25"
5	Sergio Higuita (COL)	EF Pro Cycling	+ 26"
6	Nils Politt (GER)	Israel Start-Up Nation	+ 28"
7	Krists Neilands (LAT)	Israel Start-Up Nation	+ 28"
8	Felix Großschartner (AUT)	Bora–Hansgrohe	+ 31"
9	Vincenzo Nibali (ITA)	Trek–Segafredo	+ 31"
10	Peter Sagan (SVK)	Bora–Hansgrohe	+ 36"

=== Stage 4 ===
11 March 2020 — Saint-Amand-Montrond to Saint-Amand-Montrond, 15.1 km (9.4 mi) (ITT)

Stage 4 Result
Rank	Rider	Team	Time
1	Søren Kragh Andersen (DEN)	Team Sunweb	18' 51"
2	Maximilian Schachmann (GER)	Bora–Hansgrohe	+ 6"
3	Kasper Asgreen (DEN)	Deceuninck–Quick-Step	+ 12"
4	Thomas De Gendt (BEL)	Lotto–Soudal	+ 13"
5	Pello Bilbao (ESP)	Bahrain–McLaren	+ 15"
6	Victor Campenaerts (BEL)	NTT Pro Cycling	+ 17"
7	Michael Matthews (AUS)	Team Sunweb	+ 18"
8	Stefan Küng (SUI)	Groupama–FDJ	+ 26"
9	Tobias Ludvigsson (SWE)	Groupama–FDJ	+ 27"
10	Lawson Craddock (USA)	EF Pro Cycling	+ 29"

General classification after Stage 4
Rank	Rider	Team	Time
1	Maximilian Schachmann (GER)	Bora–Hansgrohe	13h 30' 58"
2	Søren Kragh Andersen (DEN)	Team Sunweb	+ 58"
3	Felix Großschartner (AUT)	Bora–Hansgrohe	+ 1' 01"
4	Nils Politt (GER)	Israel Start-Up Nation	+ 1' 05"
5	Sergio Higuita (COL)	EF Pro Cycling	+ 1' 06"
6	Dylan Teuns (BEL)	Bahrain–McLaren	+ 1' 10"
7	Tiesj Benoot (BEL)	Team Sunweb	+ 1' 11"
8	Mads Würtz Schmidt (DEN)	Israel Start-Up Nation	+ 1' 11"
9	Giacomo Nizzolo (ITA)	NTT Pro Cycling	+ 1' 15"
10	Michael Matthews (AUS)	Team Sunweb	+ 1' 16"

=== Stage 5 ===
12 March 2020 — Gannat to La Côte-Saint-André, 227 km (141 mi)

Stage 5 Result
Rank	Rider	Team	Time
1	Niccolò Bonifazio (ITA)	Total Direct Énergie	5h 18' 02"
2	Iván García (ESP)	Bahrain–McLaren	+ 0"
3	Peter Sagan (SVK)	Bora–Hansgrohe	+ 0"
4	Nacer Bouhanni (FRA)	Arkéa–Samsic	+ 0"
5	Hugo Hofstetter (FRA)	Israel Start-Up Nation	+ 0"
6	Andrea Pasqualon (ITA)	Circus–Wanty Gobert	+ 0"
7	John Degenkolb (GER)	Lotto–Soudal	+ 0"
8	Elia Viviani (ITA)	Cofidis	+ 0"
9	Bryan Coquard (FRA)	B&B Hotels–Vital Concept	+ 0"
10	Marc Sarreau (FRA)	Groupama–FDJ	+ 0"

General classification after Stage 5
Rank	Rider	Team	Time
1	Maximilian Schachmann (GER)	Bora–Hansgrohe	18h 49' 00"
2	Søren Kragh Andersen (DEN)	Team Sunweb	+ 58"
3	Felix Großschartner (AUT)	Bora–Hansgrohe	+ 1' 01"
4	Nils Politt (GER)	Israel Start-Up Nation	+ 1' 05"
5	Sergio Higuita (COL)	EF Pro Cycling	+ 1' 06"
6	Dylan Teuns (BEL)	Bahrain–McLaren	+ 1' 10"
7	Tiesj Benoot (BEL)	Team Sunweb	+ 1' 11"
8	Mads Würtz Schmidt (DEN)	Israel Start-Up Nation	+ 1' 11"
9	Giacomo Nizzolo (ITA)	NTT Pro Cycling	+ 1' 15"
10	Michael Matthews (AUS)	Team Sunweb	+ 1' 16"

=== Stage 6 ===
13 March 2020 — Sorgues to Apt, 160.5 km (99.7 mi)

Bahrain–McLaren withdrew before the start of stage 6, following concerns surrounding the COVID-19 pandemic.

Stage 6 Result
Rank	Rider	Team	Time
1	Tiesj Benoot (BEL)	Team Sunweb	3h 57' 02"
2	Michael Matthews (AUS)	Team Sunweb	+ 22"
3	Sergio Higuita (COL)	EF Pro Cycling	+ 22"
4	Bob Jungels (LUX)	Deceuninck–Quick-Step	+ 22"
5	Julian Alaphilippe (FRA)	Deceuninck–Quick-Step	+ 22"
6	Vincenzo Nibali (ITA)	Trek–Segafredo	+ 22"
7	Thibaut Pinot (FRA)	Groupama–FDJ	+ 22"
8	Guillaume Martin (FRA)	Cofidis	+ 22"
9	Rudy Molard (FRA)	Groupama–FDJ	+ 22"
10	Nairo Quintana (COL)	Arkéa–Samsic	+ 22"

General classification after Stage 6
Rank	Rider	Team	Time
1	Maximilian Schachmann (GER)	Bora–Hansgrohe	22h 46' 24"
2	Tiesj Benoot (BEL)	Team Sunweb	+ 36"
3	Sergio Higuita (COL)	EF Pro Cycling	+ 1' 01"
4	Felix Großschartner (AUT)	Bora–Hansgrohe	+ 1' 01"
5	Michael Matthews (AUS)	Team Sunweb	+ 1' 10"
6	Vincenzo Nibali (ITA)	Trek–Segafredo	+ 1' 18"
7	Rudy Molard (FRA)	Groupama–FDJ	+ 1' 29"
8	Thibaut Pinot (FRA)	Groupama–FDJ	+ 1' 30"
9	Tanel Kangert (EST)	EF Pro Cycling	+ 1' 52"
10	Julian Alaphilippe (FRA)	Deceuninck–Quick-Step	+ 2' 04"

=== Stage 7 ===
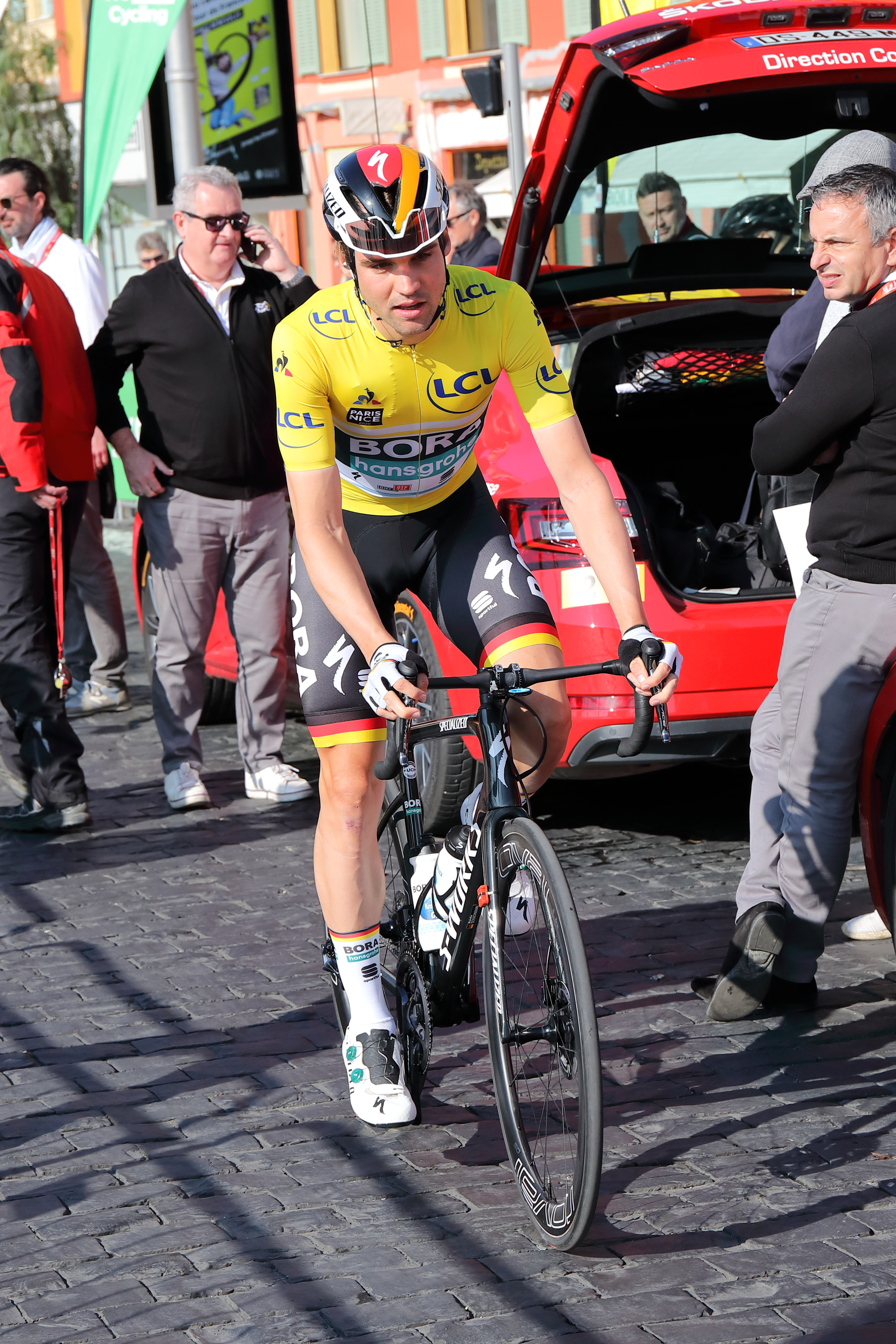
Eventual race winner Maximilian Schachmann wearing the yellow jersey of race leader at the start of stage 7

14 March 2020 — Nice to Valdeblore La Colmiane, 166.5 km (103.5 mi)

Stage 7 Result
Rank	Rider	Team	Time
1	Nairo Quintana (COL)	Arkéa–Samsic	4h 27' 01"
2	Tiesj Benoot (BEL)	Team Sunweb	+ 46"
3	Thibaut Pinot (FRA)	Groupama–FDJ	+ 56"
4	Sergio Higuita (COL)	EF Pro Cycling	+ 56"
5	Vincenzo Nibali (ITA)	Trek–Segafredo	+ 56"
6	Maximilian Schachmann (GER)	Bora–Hansgrohe	+ 58"
7	Guillaume Martin (FRA)	Cofidis	+ 1' 19"
8	Tanel Kangert (EST)	EF Pro Cycling	+ 1' 22"
9	Romain Bardet (FRA)	AG2R La Mondiale	+ 1' 32"
10	Rudy Molard (FRA)	Groupama–FDJ	+ 1' 32"

General classification after Stage 7
Rank	Rider	Team	Time
1	Maximilian Schachmann (GER)	Bora–Hansgrohe	27h 14' 23"
2	Tiesj Benoot (BEL)	Team Sunweb	+ 18"
3	Sergio Higuita (COL)	EF Pro Cycling	+ 59"
4	Vincenzo Nibali (ITA)	Trek–Segafredo	+ 1' 16"
5	Thibaut Pinot (FRA)	Groupama–FDJ	+ 1' 24"
6	Nairo Quintana (COL)	Arkéa–Samsic	+ 1' 30"
7	Rudy Molard (FRA)	Groupama–FDJ	+ 2' 03"
8	Tanel Kangert (EST)	EF Pro Cycling	+ 2' 16"
9	Felix Großschartner (AUT)	Bora–Hansgrohe	+ 3' 39"
10	Søren Kragh Andersen (DEN)	Team Sunweb	+ 4' 36"

=== Stage 8 (cancelled) ===
15 March 2020 — Nice to Nice, 113.5 km (70.5 mi)

Following stage 5, the decision was made to cancel stage 8 in order to limit the exposure of staff and riders during the COVID-19 pandemic.

== Classification leadership table ==
Classification leadership by stage
Stage	Winner	General classification	Points classification	Mountains classification	Young rider classification	Teams classification
1	Maximilian Schachmann	Maximilian Schachmann	Maximilian Schachmann	Jonathan Hivert	Cees Bol	Team Sunweb
2	Giacomo Nizzolo	Maximilian Schachmann	Maximilian Schachmann	Jonathan Hivert	Sergio Higuita	Israel Start-Up Nation
3	Iván García	Maximilian Schachmann	Giacomo Nizzolo	Jonathan Hivert	Sergio Higuita	Israel Start-Up Nation
4	Søren Kragh Andersen	Maximilian Schachmann	Maximilian Schachmann	Jonathan Hivert	Sergio Higuita	Bora–Hansgrohe
5	Niccolò Bonifazio	Maximilian Schachmann	Maximilian Schachmann	Jonathan Hivert	Sergio Higuita	Bora–Hansgrohe
6	Tiesj Benoot	Maximilian Schachmann	Maximilian Schachmann	Nicolas Edet	Sergio Higuita	Team Sunweb
7	Nairo Quintana	Maximilian Schachmann	Tiesj Benoot	Nicolas Edet	Sergio Higuita	Team Sunweb
8	Cancelled					
Final		Maximilian Schachmann	Tiesj Benoot	Nicolas Edet	Sergio Higuita	Team Sunweb

== Final classification standings ==
Legend
Denotes the winner of the general classification	Denotes the winner of the young rider classification
Denotes the winner of the points classification	Denotes the winner of the teams classification
Denotes the winner of the mountains classification	

=== General classification ===
Final general classification (1–10)
Rank	Rider	Team	Time
1	Maximilian Schachmann (GER)	Bora–Hansgrohe	27h 14' 23"
2	Tiesj Benoot (BEL)	Team Sunweb	+ 18"
3	Sergio Higuita (COL)	EF Pro Cycling	+ 59"
4	Vincenzo Nibali (ITA)	Trek–Segafredo	+ 1' 16"
5	Thibaut Pinot (FRA)	Groupama–FDJ	+ 1' 24"
6	Nairo Quintana (COL)	Arkéa–Samsic	+ 1' 30"
7	Rudy Molard (FRA)	Groupama–FDJ	+ 2' 03"
8	Tanel Kangert (EST)	EF Pro Cycling	+ 2' 16"
9	Felix Großschartner (AUT)	Bora–Hansgrohe	+ 3' 39"
10	Søren Kragh Andersen (DEN)	Team Sunweb	+ 4' 36"

=== Points classification ===
Final points classification (1–10)
Rank	Rider	Team	Points
1	Tiesj Benoot (BEL)	Team Sunweb	43
2	Maximilian Schachmann (GER)	Bora–Hansgrohe	38
3	Sergio Higuita (COL)	EF Pro Cycling	28
4	Julian Alaphilippe (FRA)	Deceuninck–Quick-Step	22
5	Nairo Quintana (COL)	Arkéa–Samsic	16
6	Michael Matthews (AUS)	Team Sunweb	16
7	Søren Kragh Andersen (DEN)	Team Sunweb	15
8	Vincenzo Nibali (ITA)	Trek–Segafredo	15
9	Andrea Pasqualon (ITA)	Circus–Wanty Gobert	14
10	Thibaut Pinot (FRA)	Groupama–FDJ	13

=== Mountains classification ===
Final mountains classification (1–10)
Rank	Rider	Team	Points
1	Nicolas Edet (FRA)	Cofidis	53
2	Tiesj Benoot (BEL)	Team Sunweb	19
3	Thomas De Gendt (BEL)	Lotto–Soudal	18
4	Julian Alaphilippe (FRA)	Deceuninck–Quick-Step	16
5	Anthony Perez (FRA)	Cofidis	15
6	Nairo Quintana (COL)	Arkéa–Samsic	10
7	Søren Kragh Andersen (DEN)	Team Sunweb	8
8	José Manuel Díaz (ESP)	Nippo–Delko–One Provence	7
9	Vincenzo Nibali (ITA)	Trek–Segafredo	6
10	Thibaut Pinot (FRA)	Groupama–FDJ	6

=== Young rider classification ===
Final young rider classification (1–9)
Rank	Rider	Team	Time
1	Sergio Higuita (COL)	EF Pro Cycling	22h 47' 25"
2	Aurélien Paret-Peintre (FRA)	AG2R La Mondiale	+ 15' 28"
3	Kasper Asgreen (DEN)	Deceuninck–Quick-Step	+ 25' 57"
4	Cees Bol (NED)	Team Sunweb	+ 31' 02"
5	Connor Swift (GBR)	Arkéa–Samsic	+ 38' 48"
6	José Manuel Díaz (ESP)	Nippo–Delko–One Provence	+ 39' 14"
7	Chris Hamilton (AUS)	Team Sunweb	+ 43' 02"
8	Piet Allegaert (BEL)	Cofidis	+ 50' 56"
9	Cyril Barthe (FRA)	B&B Hotels–Vital Concept	+ 54' 24"

=== Teams classification ===
Final teams classification (1–10)
Rank	Team	Time
1	Team Sunweb	81h 52' 39"
2	Groupama–FDJ	+ 3' 25"
3	Trek–Segafredo	+ 9' 19"
4	Lotto–Soudal	+ 15' 31"
5	EF Pro Cycling	+ 19' 17"
6	Deceuninck–Quick-Step	+ 21' 06"
7	Bora–Hansgrohe	+ 24' 38"
8	Circus–Wanty Gobert	+ 30' 51"
9	AG2R La Mondiale	+ 33' 41"
10	Arkéa–Samsic	+ 43' 03"
