= Will Routley =

Canadian cyclist

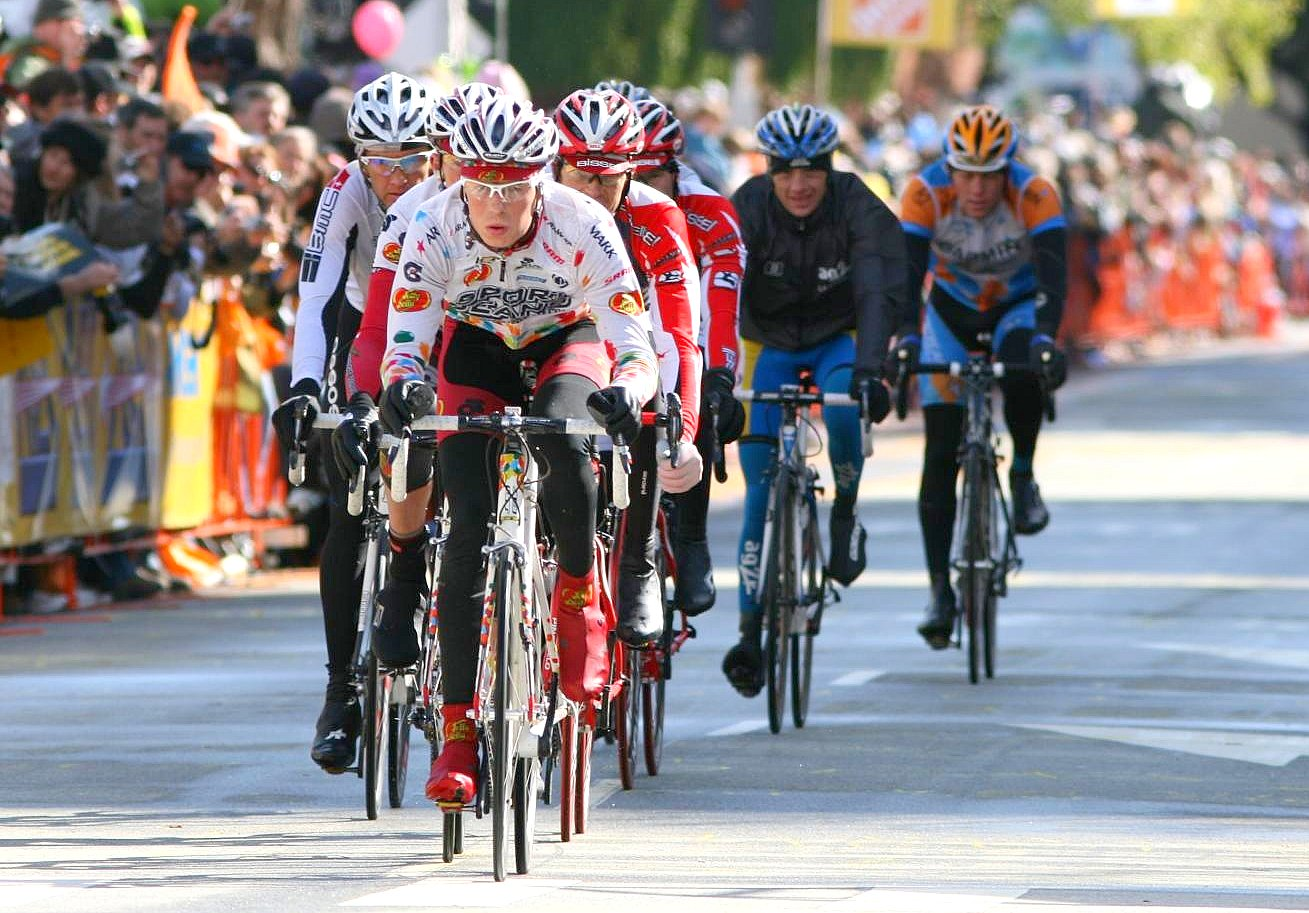

Personal information
- Full name: Will Routley
- Born: May 23, 1983 (age 43) Whistler, British Columbia

Cycling career
- Sport: Cycling
- Current team: Retired
- Discipline: Road
- Role: Rider

Professional teams
- 2008: Symmetrics
- 2009–2010: Jelly Belly Cycling Team
- 2011–2012: SpiderTech–C10
- 2013: Accent Jobs–Wanty
- 2014–2016: Optum–Kelly Benefit Strategies

Major wins
- Mountains classification 2014 Tour of California; National Road Race Championships (2010)

Will Routley (born May 23, 1983 in Whistler, British Columbia) is a Canadian former cyclist.

== Major results ==
2004
3rd Road race, National Under-23 Road Championships
2006
1st Stage 3 (TTT) Vuelta a El Salvador
2007
1st Stage 4 (TTT) Vuelta a El Salvador
2008
9th Overall Herald Sun Tour
2009
9th Overall Jelajah Malaysia
2010
1st Road race, National Road Championships
3rd Overall Redlands Bicycle Classic

1st Stage 1

8th Overall Tour de Korea
2011
2nd Road race, National Road Championships
2nd Tro-Bro Léon
2012
9th Overall Tour of Turkey
2014
Tour of California

1st Mountains classification
1st Stage 4

7th Overall Tour of the Gila
9th White Spot / Delta Road Race
10th Philadelphia Cycling Classic
2016
2nd Overall GP Liberty Seguros

1st Stage 2

3rd Road race, National Road Championships
