= 2020 Tour Colombia =

2020 UCI America Tour

Race details
- Dates: February 11–16, 2020
- Stages: 6
- Distance: 878.1 km (545.6 mi)
- Winning time: 19h 55' 51"

Results
Jersey awarded to the overall winner	Winner	Sergio Higuita (COL)	(EF Pro Cycling)
	Second	Daniel Martínez (COL)	(EF Pro Cycling)
	Third	Jonathan Caicedo (ECU)	(EF Pro Cycling)
Jersey awarded to the points classification winner	Points	Juan Sebastián Molano (COL)	(UAE Team Emirates)
Jersey awarded to the mountains classification winner	Mountains	Fabio Duarte (COL)	(Team Medellín)
Jersey awarded to the young rider classification winner	Young rider	Sergio Higuita (COL)	(EF Pro Cycling)
	Team	EF Pro Cycling	

The 2020 Tour Colombia was a road cycling stage race that took place in Colombia between 11 and 16 February 2020. It was the third edition of the Tour Colombia, and was rated as a 2.1 event as part of the UCI America Tour.

== Teams ==
Twenty-seven teams were invited to start the race. These included six UCI WorldTeams, six UCI Professional Continental teams, ten UCI Continental teams and five national teams. Each team entered six riders, with the exception of Amore & Vita–Prodir which only entered five. Of the starting peloton of 161 riders, 131 finished.

UCI WorldTeams

- Deceuninck–Quick-Step
- EF Pro Cycling
- Israel Start-Up Nation
- Movistar Team
- Team INEOS
- UAE Team Emirates

UCI Professional Continental Teams

- Androni Giocattoli–Sidermec
- Bardiani–CSF–Faizanè
- Rally Cycling
- Team Novo Nordisk
- Uno-X Norwegian Development Team
- Vini Zabù–KTM

UCI Continental Teams

- Agrupación Virgen de Fátima–SaddleDrunk
- Amore & Vita–Prodir
- Canel's Pro Cycling
- Colombia Tierra de Atletas–GW Bicicletas
- Efapel
- EPM–Scott
- Equipo Continental Supergiros
- Team Medellín
- Equipe Continental Orgullo Paisa
- Team Illuminate

National Teams

- Brazil
- Colombia
- Ecuador
- Russia
- Venezuela

== Route ==
Stage characteristics and winners
Stage	Date	Course	Distance	Type	Stage winner
1	February 11	Tunja to Tunja	16.7 km (10.4 mi)	Team time trial	EF Pro Cycling
2	February 12	Paipa to Duitama	152 km (94 mi)	Flat stage	Juan Sebastián Molano (COL)
3	February 13	Paipa to Sogamoso	177.7 km (110.4 mi)	Medium mountain stage	Juan Sebastián Molano (COL)
4	February 14	Paipa to Santa Rosa de Viterbo	168.6 km (104.8 mi)	Medium mountain stage	Sergio Higuita (COL)
5	February 15	Paipa to Zipaquirá	180.5 km (112.2 mi)	Medium mountain stage	Juan Sebastián Molano (COL)
6	February 16	Zipaquirá to El Once/Alto del Verjón	182.6 km (113.5 mi)	Mountain stage	Daniel Martínez (COL)
Total		878.1 km (545.6 mi)			

== Stages ==
=== Stage 1 ===
11 February 2020 – Tunja to Tunja, 16.7 km (10.4 mi) (TTT)

Stage 1 Result
Rank	Team	Time
1	EF Pro Cycling	18' 01"
2	Deceuninck–Quick-Step	+ 45"
3	Team INEOS	+ 46"
4	Rally Cycling	+ 59"
5	UAE Team Emirates	+ 1' 00"
6	EPM–Scott	+ 1' 00"
7	Movistar Team	+ 1' 02"
8	Israel Start-Up Nation	+ 1' 21"
9	Team Medellín	+ 1' 22"
10	Uno-X Norwegian Development Team	+ 1' 32"

General classification after Stage 1
Rank	Rider	Team	Time
1	Jonathan Caicedo (ECU)	EF Pro Cycling	18' 01"
2	Sergio Higuita (COL)	EF Pro Cycling	+ 0"
3	Daniel Martínez (COL)	EF Pro Cycling	+ 0"
4	Tejay van Garderen (USA)	EF Pro Cycling	+ 0"
5	Lawson Craddock (USA)	EF Pro Cycling	+ 0"
6	Julian Alaphilippe (FRA)	Deceuninck–Quick-Step	+ 45"
7	Bob Jungels (LUX)	Deceuninck–Quick-Step	+ 45"
8	Jannik Steimle (GER)	Deceuninck–Quick-Step	+ 45"
9	Bert Van Lerberghe (BEL)	Deceuninck–Quick-Step	+ 45"
10	Egan Bernal (COL)	Team INEOS	+ 46"

=== Stage 2 ===
12 February 2020 – Paipa to Duitama, 152 km (94 mi)

Stage 2 Result
Rank	Rider	Team	Time
1	Juan Sebastián Molano (COL)	UAE Team Emirates	3h 12' 09"
2	Álvaro Hodeg (COL)	Deceuninck–Quick-Step	+ 0"
3	Itamar Einhorn (ISR)	Israel Start-Up Nation	+ 0"
4	Jhonatan Restrepo (COL)	Androni Giocattoli–Sidermec	+ 0"
5	Edwin Ávila (COL)	Israel Start-Up Nation	+ 0"
6	Bryan Gómez (COL)	Equipo Continental Supergiros	+ 0"
7	Colin Joyce (USA)	Rally Cycling	+ 0"
8	Marco Benfatto (ITA)	Bardiani–CSF–Faizanè	+ 0"
9	Julian David Molano (COL)	Colombia	+ 0"
10	Félix Barón (COL)	Team Illuminate	+ 0"

General classification after Stage 2
Rank	Rider	Team	Time
1	Jonathan Caicedo (ECU)	EF Pro Cycling	3h 30' 10"
2	Sergio Higuita (COL)	EF Pro Cycling	+ 0"
3	Daniel Martínez (COL)	EF Pro Cycling	+ 0"
4	Tejay van Garderen (USA)	EF Pro Cycling	+ 0"
5	Lawson Craddock (USA)	EF Pro Cycling	+ 9"
6	Bert Van Lerberghe (BEL)	Deceuninck–Quick-Step	+ 45"
7	Jannik Steimle (GER)	Deceuninck–Quick-Step	+ 45"
8	Egan Bernal (COL)	Team INEOS	+ 46"
9	Richard Carapaz (ECU)	Team INEOS	+ 46"
10	Jhonatan Narváez (ECU)	Team INEOS	+ 46"

=== Stage 3 ===
13 February 2020 – Paipa to Sogamoso, 177.7 km (110.4 mi)

Stage 3 Result
Rank	Rider	Team	Time
1	Juan Sebastián Molano (COL)	UAE Team Emirates	3h 57' 00"
2	Edwin Ávila (COL)	Israel Start-Up Nation	+ 0"
3	Álvaro Hodeg (COL)	Deceuninck–Quick-Step	+ 0"
4	Julian David Molano (COL)	Colombia	+ 0"
5	Jhonatan Restrepo (COL)	Androni Giocattoli–Sidermec	+ 0"
6	Umberto Marengo (ITA)	Vini Zabù–KTM	+ 0"
7	Bert Van Lerberghe (BEL)	Deceuninck–Quick-Step	+ 0"
8	Travis McCabe (USA)	Israel Start-Up Nation	+ 0"
9	Richard Carapaz (ECU)	Team INEOS	+ 0"
10	Idar Andersen (NOR)	Uno-X Norwegian Development Team	+ 0"

General classification after Stage 3
Rank	Rider	Team	Time
1	Jonathan Caicedo (ECU)	EF Pro Cycling	7h 27' 10"
2	Sergio Higuita (COL)	EF Pro Cycling	+ 0"
3	Daniel Martínez (COL)	EF Pro Cycling	+ 0"
4	Tejay van Garderen (USA)	EF Pro Cycling	+ 0"
5	Juan Sebastián Molano (COL)	UAE Team Emirates	+ 40"
6	Bert Van Lerberghe (BEL)	Deceuninck–Quick-Step	+ 45"
7	Jannik Steimle (GER)	Deceuninck–Quick-Step	+ 45"
8	Richard Carapaz (ECU)	Team INEOS	+ 46"
9	Egan Bernal (COL)	Team INEOS	+ 46"
10	Jhonatan Narváez (ECU)	Team INEOS	+ 46"

=== Stage 4 ===
14 February 2020 – Paipa to Santa Rosa de Viterbo, 168.6 km (104.8 mi)

Stage 4 Result
Rank	Rider	Team	Time
1	Sergio Higuita (COL)	EF Pro Cycling	3h 58' 47"
2	Egan Bernal (COL)	Team INEOS	+ 0"
3	Julian Alaphilippe (FRA)	Deceuninck–Quick-Step	+ 1"
4	Daniel Martínez (COL)	EF Pro Cycling	+ 2"
5	Torstein Træen (NOR)	Uno-X Norwegian Development Team	+ 2"
6	Richard Carapaz (ECU)	Team INEOS	+ 2"
7	Miguel Flórez (COL)	Androni Giocattoli–Sidermec	+ 2"
8	Jonathan Caicedo (ECU)	EF Pro Cycling	+ 4"
9	Esteban Chaves (COL)	Colombia	+ 4"
10	Freddy Montaña (COL)	EPM–Scott	+ 4"

General classification after Stage 4
Rank	Rider	Team	Time
1	Sergio Higuita (COL)	EF Pro Cycling	11h 25' 47"
2	Daniel Martínez (COL)	EF Pro Cycling	+ 12"
3	Jonathan Caicedo (ECU)	EF Pro Cycling	+ 14"
4	Egan Bernal (COL)	Team INEOS	+ 50"
5	Richard Carapaz (ECU)	Team INEOS	+ 58"
6	Freddy Montaña (COL)	EPM–Scott	+ 1' 14"
7	Aldemar Reyes (COL)	EPM–Scott	+ 1' 28"
8	Gavin Mannion (USA)	Rally Cycling	+ 1' 30"
9	Sergio Henao (COL)	UAE Team Emirates	+ 1' 31"
10	Diego Ochoa (COL)	EPM–Scott	+ 1' 31"

=== Stage 5 ===
15 February 2020 – Paipa to Zipaquirá, 180.5 km (112.2 mi)

Stage 5 Result
Rank	Rider	Team	Time
1	Juan Sebastián Molano (COL)	UAE Team Emirates	4h 06' 00"
2	Álvaro Hodeg (COL)	Deceuninck–Quick-Step	+ 0"
3	Jhonatan Restrepo (COL)	Androni Giocattoli–Sidermec	+ 0"
4	Travis McCabe (USA)	Israel Start-Up Nation	+ 0"
5	Colin Joyce (USA)	Rally Cycling	+ 0"
6	Juan Francisco Rosales (MEX)	Canel's Pro Cycling	+ 0"
7	Richard Carapaz (ECU)	Team INEOS	+ 0"
8	Edwin Ávila (COL)	Israel Start-Up Nation	+ 0"
9	Lars Saugstad (NOR)	Uno-X Norwegian Development Team	+ 0"
10	Diego Ochoa (COL)	EPM–Scott	+ 0"

General classification after Stage 5
Rank	Rider	Team	Time
1	Sergio Higuita (COL)	EF Pro Cycling	15h 31' 47"
2	Daniel Martínez (COL)	EF Pro Cycling	+ 12"
3	Jonathan Caicedo (ECU)	EF Pro Cycling	+ 14"
4	Egan Bernal (COL)	Team INEOS	+ 50"
5	Richard Carapaz (ECU)	Team INEOS	+ 58"
6	Freddy Montaña (COL)	EPM–Scott	+ 1' 14"
7	Aldemar Reyes (COL)	EPM–Scott	+ 1' 28"
8	Gavin Mannion (USA)	Rally Cycling	+ 1' 30"
9	Sergio Henao (COL)	UAE Team Emirates	+ 1' 31"
10	Diego Ochoa (COL)	EPM–Scott	+ 1' 31"

=== Stage 6 ===
16 February 2020 – Zipaquirá to El Once/Alto del Verjón, 182.6 km (113.5 mi)

Stage 6 Result
Rank	Rider	Team	Time
1	Daniel Martínez (COL)	EF Pro Cycling	4h 24' 09"
2	Sergio Higuita (COL)	EF Pro Cycling	+ 1"
3	Egan Bernal (COL)	Team INEOS	+ 3"
4	Miguel Flórez (COL)	Androni Giocattoli–Sidermec	+ 9"
5	Jonathan Caicedo (ECU)	EF Pro Cycling	+ 14"
6	Robinson Chalapud (COL)	Team Medellín	+ 52"
7	Hernán Aguirre (COL)	Colombia Tierra de Atletas–GW Bicicletas	+ 1' 08"
8	Diego Andres Camargo (COL)	Colombia Tierra de Atletas–GW Bicicletas	+ 1' 16"
9	Freddy Montaña (COL)	EPM–Scott	+ 1' 16"
10	Esteban Chaves (COL)	Colombia	+ 1' 16"

General classification after Stage 6
Rank	Rider	Team	Time
1	Sergio Higuita (COL)	EF Pro Cycling	19h 55' 51"
2	Daniel Martínez (COL)	EF Pro Cycling	+ 7"
3	Jonathan Caicedo (ECU)	EF Pro Cycling	+ 33"
4	Egan Bernal (COL)	Team INEOS	+ 54"
5	Miguel Flórez (COL)	Androni Giocattoli–Sidermec	+ 2' 00"
6	Freddy Montaña (COL)	EPM–Scott	+ 2' 35"
7	Esteban Chaves (COL)	Colombia	+ 3' 08"
8	Hernán Aguirre (COL)	Colombia Tierra de Atletas–GW Bicicletas	+ 3' 14"
9	Torstein Træen (NOR)	Uno-X Norwegian Development Team	+ 3' 18"
10	Sergio Henao (COL)	UAE Team Emirates	+ 3' 21"

== Classification leadership table ==
Classification leadership by stage
Stage	Winner	General classification	Points classification	Mountains classification	Young rider classification	Team classification
1	EF Pro Cycling	Jonathan Caicedo	not awarded	not awarded	Sergio Higuita	EF Pro Cycling
2	Juan Sebastián Molano	Jonathan Caicedo	Juan Sebastián Molano	not awarded	Sergio Higuita	EF Pro Cycling
3	Juan Sebastián Molano	Jonathan Caicedo	Juan Sebastián Molano	Simon Pellaud	Sergio Higuita	EF Pro Cycling
4	Sergio Higuita	Sergio Higuita	Juan Sebastián Molano	Simon Pellaud	Sergio Higuita	EF Pro Cycling
5	Juan Sebastián Molano	Sergio Higuita	Juan Sebastián Molano	Fabio Duarte	Sergio Higuita	EF Pro Cycling
6	Daniel Martínez	Sergio Higuita	Juan Sebastián Molano	Fabio Duarte	Sergio Higuita	EF Pro Cycling
Final		Sergio Higuita	Juan Sebastián Molano	Fabio Duarte	Sergio Higuita	EF Pro Cycling

== Final standings ==
=== General classification ===
Final general classification (1–10)
Rank	Rider	Team	Time
1	Sergio Higuita (COL)	EF Pro Cycling	19h 55' 51"
2	Daniel Martínez (COL)	EF Pro Cycling	+ 7"
3	Jonathan Caicedo (ECU)	EF Pro Cycling	+ 33"
4	Egan Bernal (COL)	Team INEOS	+ 54"
5	Miguel Flórez (COL)	Androni Giocattoli–Sidermec	+ 2' 00"
6	Freddy Montaña (COL)	EPM–Scott	+ 2' 35"
7	Esteban Chaves (COL)	Colombia	+ 3' 08"
8	Hernán Aguirre (COL)	Colombia Tierra de Atletas–GW Bicicletas	+ 3' 14"
9	Torstein Træen (NOR)	Uno-X Norwegian Development Team	+ 3' 18"
10	Sergio Henao (COL)	UAE Team Emirates	+ 3' 21"

=== Points classification ===
Final points classification (1–10)
Rank	Rider	Team	Points
1	Juan Sebastián Molano (COL)	UAE Team Emirates	45
2	Álvaro Hodeg (COL)	Deceuninck–Quick-Step	34
3	Sergio Higuita (COL)	EF Pro Cycling	27
4	Jhonathan Restrepo (COL)	Androni Giocattoli–Sidermec	25
5	Daniel Martínez (COL)	EF Pro Cycling	23
6	Edwin Ávila (COL)	Israel Start-Up Nation	23
7	Egan Bernal (COL)	Team INEOS	22
8	Byron Guamá (ECU)	Ecuador	18
9	Richard Carapaz (ECU)	Team INEOS	14
10	Miguel Flórez (COL)	Androni Giocattoli–Sidermec	13

=== Mountains classification ===
Final mountains classification (1–10)
Rank	Rider	Team	Points
1	Fabio Duarte (COL)	Team Medellín	9
2	Egan Bernal (COL)	Team INEOS	6
3	Daniel Martínez (COL)	EF Pro Cycling	5
4	Robinson Chalapud (COL)	Team Medellín	5
5	Sergio Higuita (COL)	EF Pro Cycling	5
6	Simon Pellaud (SUI)	Androni Giocattoli–Sidermec	4
7	Walter Pedraza (COL)	Equipo Continental Supergiros	3
8	Miguel Flórez (COL)	Androni Giocattoli–Sidermec	2
9	Richard Carapaz (ECU)	Team INEOS	2
10	Edison Muñoz (COL)	Equipe Continental Orgullo Paisa	2

=== Young rider classification ===
Final young rider classification (1–10)
Rank	Rider	Team	Time
1	Sergio Higuita (COL)	EF Pro Cycling	19h 55' 51"
2	Daniel Martínez (COL)	EF Pro Cycling	+ 7"
3	Egan Bernal (COL)	Team INEOS	+ 54"
4	Miguel Flórez (COL)	Androni Giocattoli–Sidermec	+ 2' 00"
5	Hernán Aguirre (COL)	Colombia Tierra de Atletas–GW Bicicletas	+ 3' 14"
6	Torstein Træen (NOR)	Uno-X Norwegian Development Team	+ 3' 18"
7	Diego Andres Camargo (COL)	Colombia Tierra de Atletas–GW Bicicletas	+ 3' 29"
8	Aldemar Reyes (COL)	EPM–Scott	+ 4' 18"
9	Andrés Ardila (COL)	UAE Team Emirates	+ 4' 37"
10	Cristian Camilo Muñoz (COL)	UAE Team Emirates	+ 4' 59"

=== Teams classification ===
Final teams classification (1–10)
Rank	Team	Time
1	EF Pro Cycling	59h 12' 37"
2	UAE Team Emirates	+ 6' 58"
3	EPM–Scott	+ 7' 47"
4	Colombia Tierra de Atletas–GW Bicicletas	+ 8' 36"
5	Colombia	+ 10' 26"
6	Ecuador	+ 13' 56"
7	Team Medellín	+ 15' 40"
8	Team INEOS	+ 15' 54"
9	Israel Start-Up Nation	+ 17' 17"
10	Equipe Continental Orgullo Paisa	+ 21' 45"
