= 2020 UCI America Tour =

- Sixteenth edition of the UCI America Tour

Details
- Dates: October 23, 2019 – November 1, 2020
- Location: North America and South America
- Races: 10

Champions
- Individual champion: Nairo Quintana (COL) (Arkéa–Samsic)
- Teams' champion: Team Medellín
- Nations' champion: Colombia

The 2020 UCI America Tour was the sixteenth season of the UCI America Tour. The season began on October 23, 2019 with the Vuelta a Guatemala and ended on November 1, 2020.

The points leader, based on the cumulative results of previous races, wears the UCI America Tour cycling jersey. Throughout the season, points are awarded to the top finishers of stages within stage races and the final general classification standings of each of the stages races and one-day events. The quality and complexity of a race also determines how many points are awarded to the top finishers, the higher the UCI rating of a race, the more points are awarded.

The UCI ratings from highest to lowest are as follows:

- Multi-day events: 2.Pro, 2.1 and 2.2
- One-day events: 1.Pro, 1.1 and 1.2

== Events ==
=== 2019 ===
Date	Race Name	Location	UCI Rating	Winner	Team	Ref.
October 23–November 1	Vuelta a Guatemala	Guatemala	2.2	Manuel Rodas (GUA)	Decorabaños	
November 2	Road Elite Caribbean Championships (ITT)	Cuba	1.2	Kaden Hopkins (BER)	FLC Cycling Team	
November 3	Road Elite Caribbean Championships (RR)	Cuba	1.2	Félix Nodarse (CUB)	Artemisa Cycling Team	
December 16–25	Vuelta a Costa Rica	Costa Rica	2.2	Daniel Bonilla (CRC)	Scotiabank-Nestlé-Métrica-Giant	

=== 2020 ===
Date	Race Name	Location	UCI Rating	Winner	Team	Ref.
January 12–19	Vuelta al Táchira	Venezuela	2.2	Roniel Campos (VEN)	Deportivo Táchira	
January 26–February 2	Vuelta a San Juan	Argentina	2.Pro	Remco Evenepoel (BEL)	Deceuninck–Quick-Step	
February 11–16	Tour Colombia	Colombia	2.1	Sergio Higuita (COL)	EF Pro Cycling	
March 14	Gran Premio de la Patagonia	Chile	1.2	José Tito Hernández (COL)	Team Medellín	
October 23–November 1	Vuelta a Guatemala	Guatemala	2.2	Mardoqueo Vásquez (GUA)	Hino-One-La Red-Tigo-Eurobikes	
