= Matt Cooke (cyclist) =

American cyclist (born 1979)

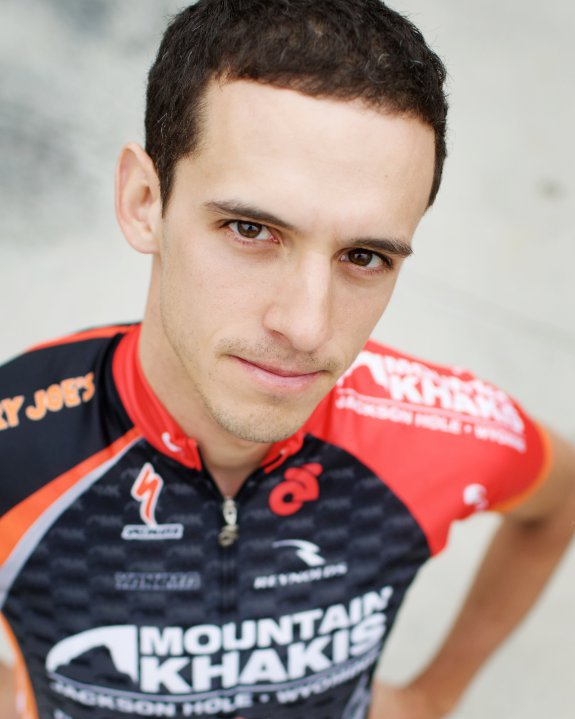

Personal information
- Full name: Matthew Cooke
- Born: August 5, 1979 (age 47) United States

Cycling career
- Sport: Cycling
- Current team: Retired
- Discipline: Road
- Role: Rider
- Rider type: Climber

Amateur team
- 2006: LSV/Kelly Benefit Strategy

Professional teams
- 2007: Navigators Insurance
- 2008: Health Net–Maxxis
- 2009: Battley Harley-Davidson
- 2010: Mountain Khakis–Jittery Joe’s
- 2011–2012: Team Exergy
- 2013–2014: Jamis–Hagens Berman

Matthew Cooke (born August 5, 1979) is an American former professional road cyclist.

== Major results ==
2006
1st Overall Green Mountain Stage Race

1st Stages 2 & 3

2012
1st Stage 3 Tour de Beauce
1st Stage 2 Sea Otter Classic
2013
1st Mountains classification, USA Pro Cycling Challenge
5th Overall Tour de Beauce
4th Overall Tour of the Gila
2014
3rd Bucks County Classic
6th Overall Tour of the Gila
