= Ecuadorian Cycling Federation =

National governing body of cycle racing in Ecuador

FEC logo

The Ecuadorian Cycling Federation or FEC (in Spanish: Federación Ecuatoriana de Ciclismo) is the national governing body of cycle racing in Ecuador.

The FEC is a member of the UCI and COPACI.
