= Sergio Higuita =

Colombian cyclist

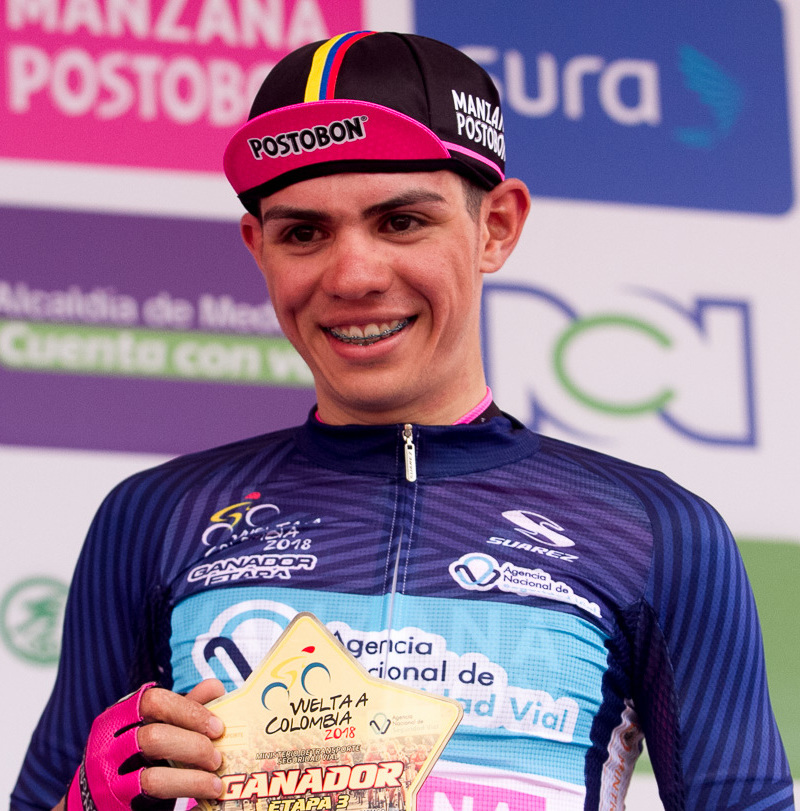
- Higuita in 2020

Personal information
- Full name: Sergio Andrés Higuita García
- Nickname: Higuita Monster
- Born: 1 August 1997 (age 29) Medellín, Colombia
- Height: 1.66 m (5 ft 5 in)
- Weight: 54 kg (119 lb)

Cycling career
- Sport: Cycling
- Current team: XDS Astana Team
- Discipline: Road
- Role: Rider
- Rider type: All-rounder

Amateur team
- 2015: 4-72 El servicio de envíos

Professional teams
- 2016–2018: Team Manzana Postobón
- 2019: Fundación Euskadi
- 2019–2021: EF Education First
- 2022–2024: Bora–Hansgrohe
- 2025–: XDS Astana Team

Major wins
- Grand Tours Vuelta a España 1 Individual stage (2019) Stage races Volta a Catalunya (2022) One-day races and Classics National Road Race Championships (2020, 2022)

Sergio Andrés Higuita García (born 1 August 1997) is a Colombian professional road racing cyclist, who currently rides for UCI WorldTeam XDS Astana Team.

== Career ==
He moved to EF Education First from UCI Continental team Euskaltel–Euskadi in May 2019, having initially been set to join in the summer. In August 2019, he was named in the startlist for the 2019 Vuelta a España. In early 2020 he finished 3rd in Paris-Nice and won the best young rider jersey. In August 2020, he was named in the startlist for the 2020 Tour de France. He did not finish the Tour but the following year he placed 25th overall.

Higuita moved to Bora–Hansgrohe for the 2022 season. On stage 6 of the 2022 Volta a Catalunya he went on a long-distance attack with Richard Carapaz. The pair stayed away for over 100 kilometers and Higuita moved into the leader's jersey. He defended his position on the final stage in Barcelona and also won the Mountains and Best Young Rider classifications.

== Major results ==
2016
9th Overall Tour de Gironde
10th Prueba Villafranca de Ordizia
2017
1st Mountains classification, Vuelta a Asturias
2018
9th Klasika Primavera
9th Overall Vuelta a Castilla y León
9th Overall Tour of China I

1st Mountains classification

2019 (1 pro win)
Vuelta a España

1st Stage 18
Combativity award Stage 18

1st Young rider classification, Volta a la Comunitat Valenciana
2nd Overall Tour of California
3rd Giro dell'Emilia
3rd GP Miguel Induráin
4th Overall Tour de Pologne
4th Road race, UCI Road World Under-23 Championships
4th Klasika Primavera
4th Trofeo Serra de Tramuntana
5th Overall Volta ao Alentejo

1st Stage 4

5th Tre Valli Varesine
6th Trofeo Campos, Porreres, Felanitx, Ses Salines
7th Overall Vuelta a Andalucía
2020 (3)
1st Road race, National Road Championships
1st Overall Tour Colombia

1st Young rider classification
1st Stages 1 (TTT) & 4

3rd Overall Paris–Nice

1st Young rider classification

2021
6th Tre Valli Varesine
9th Giro della Toscana
10th Giro di Lombardia
2022 (5)
1st Road race, National Road Championships
1st Overall Volta a Catalunya

1st Mountains classification
1st Young rider classification

1st Stage 4 Tour de Romandie
1st Stage 5 Volta ao Algarve
2nd Overall Tour de Suisse

1st Young rider classification

2nd Tre Valli Varesine
4th Giro di Lombardia
5th Liège–Bastogne–Liège
8th Overall Tour de Pologne

1st Stage 3

10th Strade Bianche
2023 (1)
2nd GP Miguel Induráin
3rd Overall Vuelta a San Juan
6th Overall Tour of the Basque Country

1st Stage 5

2024
2nd Road race, National Road Championships
3rd Overall Czech Tour
6th Vuelta a Murcia
8th Grand Prix of Aargau Canton
9th Overall Sibiu Cycling Tour
10th Overall Vuelta a Burgos
2025
5th Tre Valli Varesine
2026
2nd Overall AlUla Tour
9th Overall Tour de Suisse

=== General classification results timeline ===
Grand Tour general classification results
Grand Tour	2019	2020	2021	2022	2023	2024	2025	2026
Giro d'Italia	—	—	—	—	—	—	—	—
Tour de France	—	DNF	25	—	—	—	14	
Vuelta a España	14	—	—	23	43	—	—	
Major stage race general classification results
Major stage race	2019	2020	2021	2022	2023	2024	2025	2026
Paris–Nice	—	3	—	—	—	—	—	—
Tirreno–Adriatico	—	—	35	—	—	—	—	—
Volta a Catalunya	—	NH	—	1	—	33	—	—
Tour of the Basque Country	—	NH	28	DNF	6	—	—	DNF
Tour de Romandie	—	NH	—	24	DNF	82	17	11
Critérium du Dauphiné	—	64	—	—	—	—	22	—
Tour de Suisse	—	NH	—	2	43	12	—	9

=== Monuments results timeline ===
Monument	2019	2020	2021	2022	2023	2024	2025
Milan–San Remo	—	—	36	—	—	—	—
Tour of Flanders	—	—	—	—	—	—	—
Paris–Roubaix	—	NH	—	—	—	—	—
Liège–Bastogne–Liège	—	—	31	5	DNF	—	—
Giro di Lombardia	76	—	10	4	DNF	85	

Legend
—	Did not compete
DNF	Did not finish
IP	In progress
