= Andrés Ardila =

Colombian cyclist

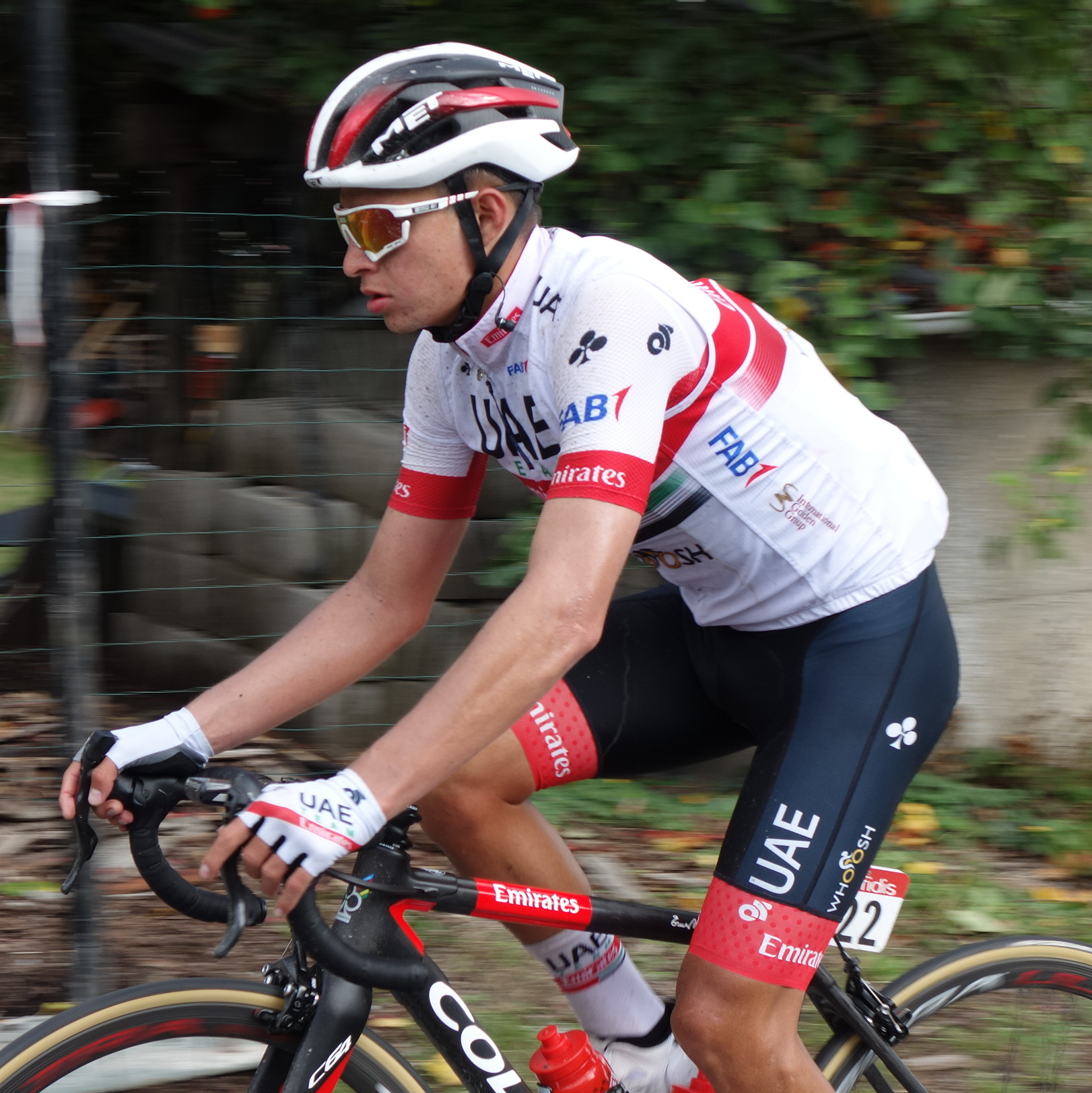
- Ardila at the 2020 La Flèche Wallonne

Personal information
- Full name: Andrés Camilo Ardila Ordoñez
- Born: 2 June 1999 (age 27) Mariquita, Colombia
- Height: 1.70 m (5 ft 7 in)
- Weight: 59 kg (130 lb)

Cycling career
- Sport: Cycling
- Current team: Nu Colombia
- Discipline: Road
- Role: Rider

Amateur teams
- 2018: Tolima es Pasión
- 2018–2019: EPM Scott

Professional teams
- 2020–2022: UAE Team Emirates
- 2023: Burgos BH
- 2024–: Nu Colombia

Andrés Camilo Ardila Ordoñez (born 2 June 1999) is a Colombian cyclist, who currently rides for UCI Continental team Nu Colombia.

== Major results ==
2017
National Junior Road Championships

2nd Road race
2nd Time trial

2018
1st Stage 5 Vuelta al Tolima
5th Overall Vuelta de la Juventud de Colombia
2019
1st Overall Giro Ciclistico d'Italia

1st Young rider classification
1st Stages 4 & 5

3rd Overall Vuelta de la Juventud de Colombia

1st Stages 3 & 5

2021
3rd Time trial, National Road Championships
2023
2nd Clásica Ciudad de Villeta
2024
1st Overall Clásica de Girardot

1st Stage 4

1st Stage 6 Vuelta a Guatemala
2025
1st Overall Tour de la Guadeloupe

1st Combination classification
1st Stage 8

4th Overall Vuelta al Valle del Cauca
