= Lawson Craddock =

American road cyclist

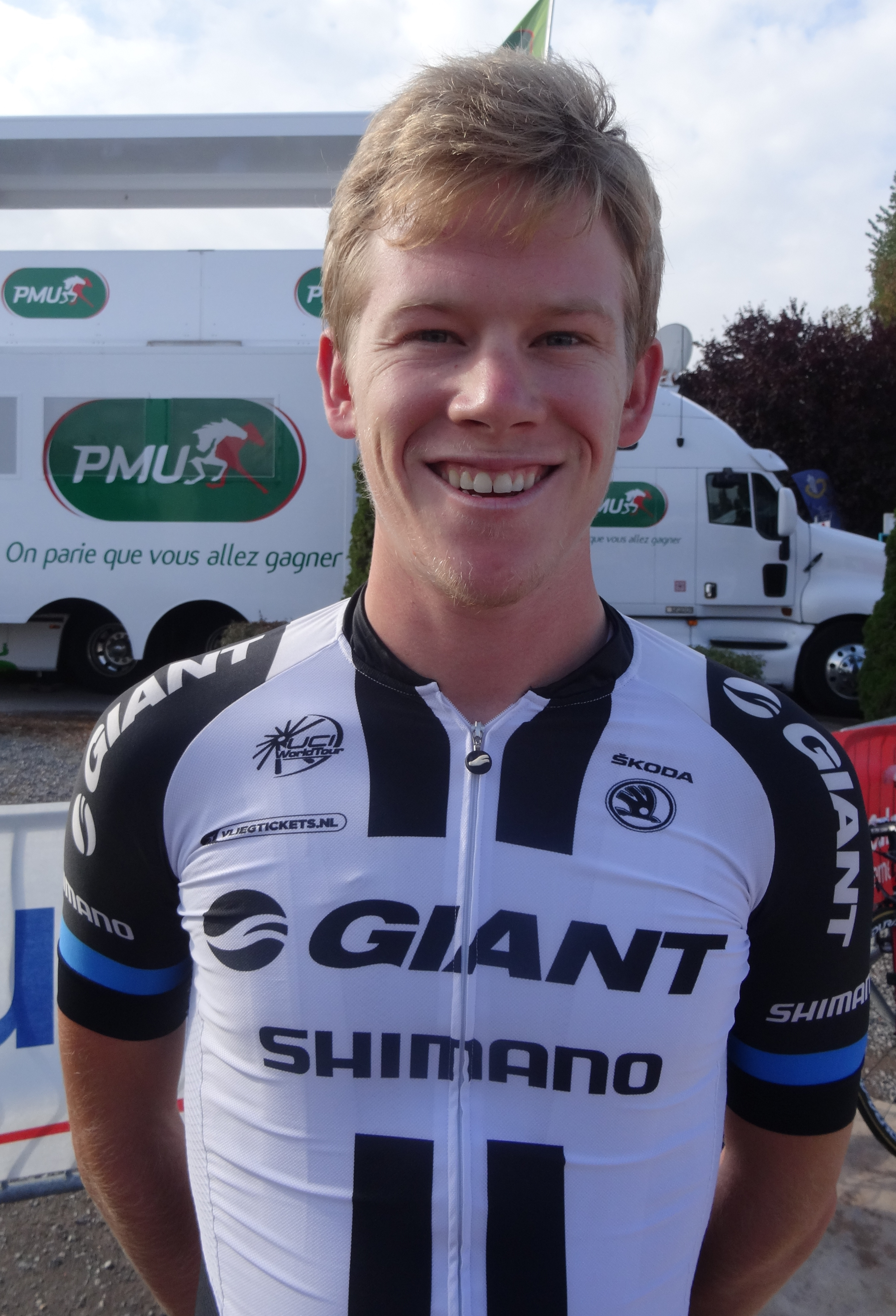
- Craddock at the 2014 Grand Prix d'Isbergues

Personal information
- Full name: Gregory Lawson Craddock
- Born: February 20, 1992 (age 34) Houston, Texas, United States
- Height: 1.78 m (5 ft 10 in)
- Weight: 68 kg (150 lb; 10 st 10 lb)

Cycling career
- Sport: Cycling
- Current team: Retired
- Disciplines: Road; Track
- Role: Rider
- Rider type: All-rounder

Professional teams
- 2011–2013: Trek–Livestrong
- 2014–2015: Giant–Shimano
- 2016–2021: Cannondale
- 2022–2024: Team BikeExchange–Jayco

Major wins
- One-day races and Classics National Time Trial Championships (2021, 2022)

Gregory Lawson Craddock (born February 20, 1992) is an American former road and track racing cyclist, who competed as a professional from 2011 to 2024. He is known for his achievement in finishing the 2018 Tour de France despite being seriously injured in the opening stage, and for raising funds for a hurricane-damaged velodrome as a result.

== Cycling career ==
After spending the 2014 and 2015 seasons with Giant–Shimano in the UCI World Tour, he moved to rival Cannondale for the 2016 and 2017 seasons.

Craddock raced in the 2018 Tour de France and crashed violently during the first stage, causing a hairline fracture in his scapula, but continued racing. He was the last rider to cross the finish line and there were many photos of him with blood covering the entire left side of his face. After that crash, he took to social media announcing he was donating $100 for every stage he finished to the Greater Houston Cycling Association in the rebuild of the Alkek Velodrome, where Craddock got his start in cycling and which was damaged by Hurricane Harvey. A GoFundMe page was also set up for people to make direct donations to the velodrome. Craddock finished the race as the "lanterne rouge", becoming the first rider in Tour history to hold last place after every stage and earning over US$250,000 for the cause. He is the only American to be awarded the lanterne rouge.

On June 11, 2020, USA Cycling announced that Craddock would be on their Men's Road Long Team for the 2020 Summer Olympics. In October 2020, he was named in the startlist for the 2020 Giro d'Italia. He was also chosen as part of the team for the 2021 Vuelta a España. On stage 19, he rode at the front of the race and controlled the final kilometers of the breakaway to contain any attacks and put his teammate, Magnus Cort, in a position to win the stage. As Cort attacked, Craddock fell back and watched as his teammate won the stage, and five seconds later when he crossed the line threw his arms in the air celebrating the victory.

== Major results ==
2008
National Novice Track Championships

1st Scratch
1st Points race

2009
1st Stage 1 (ITT) Edgar Soto Memorial
1st Stage 2b (ITT) Tour du Pays de Vaud
2nd Time trial, UCI Junior Road World Championships
4th Overall Trofeo Karlsberg
2010
National Junior Road Championships

1st Road race
1st Time trial

1st Overall Trofeo Karlsberg

1st Stages 2 & 3 (ITT)

1st Stage 1 Tour de New Braunfels
1st Stage 1 (TTT) Regio Tour
2nd Overall Trophée Centre Morbihan

1st Stage 2 (ITT)

3rd Time trial, UCI Junior Road World Championships
3rd Overall Tour du Pays de Vaud

1st Prologue & Stage 4 (ITT)

3rd Paris–Roubaix Juniors
2011
1st Stage 2 (ITT) Le Triptyque des Monts et Châteaux
1st Stage 10 Tour de la Guadeloupe
1st Stage 2 Hotter'N Hell Hundred
2nd Time trial, National Under-23 Road Championships
4th Overall Tour de Berlin
4th Overall Tulsa Tough
2012
2nd Time trial, National Under-23 Road Championships
3rd Time trial, Pan–American Under-23 Road Championships
3rd Overall Cascade Cycling Classic
3rd Copperas Cove Classic
5th Overall Tour of the Gila

1st Stage 5

2013
2nd Overall Le Triptyque des Monts et Châteaux

1st Stage 2

7th Overall USA Pro Cycling Challenge
8th Overall Tour of California

1st Young rider classification

2014
3rd Overall Tour of California

1st Young rider classification

2016
5th Overall Tour of California
6th Overall Critérium International
9th Overall Tour of the Basque Country
2018
1st Mountains classification, Settimana Internazionale Coppi e Bartali
9th Amstel Gold Race
2019
1st Stage 1 (TTT) Tour Colombia
6th Time trial, UCI Road World Championships
7th Overall Tour of Utah
2020
1st Stage 1 (TTT) Tour Colombia
2021 (1 pro win)
National Road Championships

1st Time trial
5th Road race

2022 (1)
1st Time trial, National Road Championships
Combativity award Stages 15 & 17 Vuelta a España

=== Grand Tour general classification results timeline ===
Grand Tour	2014	2015	2016	2017	2018	2019	2020	2021	2022	2023
Giro d'Italia	—	—	—	—	—	—	DNF	—	107	—
Tour de France	—	—	124	—	145	—	—	—	—	84
Vuelta a España	DNF	42	—	—	—	58	—	69	55	

Legend
DSQ	Disqualified
DNF	Did not finish
IP	In progress
