= List of wins by Cycling Academy Team and its successors =

This is a comprehensive list of victories of the NSN Cycling Team cycling team and its predecessors. The races are categorized according to the UCI Continental Circuits rules. The team was in the UCI Continental category from 2015 to 2016 then up to UCI Professional Continental from 2017 till 2019. In 2020 the Team stepped up to the UCI World Tour.

== 2015 – Cycling Academy ==
Stage 4 Tour d'Azerbaïdjan, Daniel Turek
Stage 1 Tour de Berlin, Daniel Turek
GP Polski Via Odra, Bartosz Warchoł
Israel National Time Trial championship, Yoav Bear

== 2016 – Cycling Academy ==
Namibia National Road Race championship, Dan Craven
Tour of Arad, Chris Butler
Hets Hatsafon / Northern Arrow, Guy Gabay
Stage 1 Tour de Beauce, Mihkel Räim
Israel National Time Trial championship, Aviv Yechezkel
Israel National Road Race championship, Guy Sagiv
Mexico National Road Race championship, Luis Lemus
Estonia National Road Race championship, Mihkel Räim
Overall Tour de Hongrie, Mihkel Räim

Stage 1, Mihkel Räim
Stage 4, Chris Butler

Stage 1 Tour of Rwanda, Guillaume Boivin

== 2017 – Israel Cycling Academy ==
Stage 1 Tour d'Azerbaïdjan, Mihkel Räim
Stage 5 Tour d'Azerbaïdjan, Krists Neilands
Stage 1 Okolo Slovenska, Mihkel Räim
Israel National Time Trial championship, Guy Sagiv
Israel National Road Race championship, Roy Goldstein
Latvia National Road Race championship, Krists Neilands
Stage 4 Colorado Classic, Mihkel Räim
Stage 2 Baltic Chain Tour, Ben Perry
Prologue Tour of Taihu Lake, Guillaume Boivin

== 2018 – Israel Cycling Academy ==
Stage 3 Tour de Taiwan, Edwin Ávila
Overall Vuelta a Castilla y León, Rubén Plaza

Stage 2, Mihkel Räim
Stage 3, Rubén Plaza

Stage 4 Tour of Japan, Mihkel Räim
Stage 2 Tour de Korea, Mihkel Räim
Dwars door het Hageland, Krists Neilands
Israel National Time Trial championship, Omer Goldstein
Israel National Road Race championship, Roy Goldstein
Latvia National Road Race championship, Krists Neilands
Estonia National Road Race championship, Mihkel Räim
Overall Tour of Austria, Ben Hermans

Stage 3, Ben Hermans

Great War Remembrance Race, Mihkel Räim
Famenne Ardenne Classic, Guillaume Boivin

== 2019 – Israel Cycling Academy ==
Stage 4 Tour of Rwanda, Edwin Ávila
Classic Loire Atlantique, Rudy Barbier
Overall GP Beiras e Serra da Estrela, Edwin Ávila

Stage 1, Edwin Ávila

Overall Vuelta a Castilla y León, Davide Cimolai

Stages 1 & 2, Davide Cimolai

Austria National Time Trial championship, Matthias Brändle
Overall Tour of Estonia, Mihkel Räim

Prologue, Matthias Brändle
Stage 1, Rudy Barbier
Stage 2, Mihkel Räim

Overall Tour de Hongrie, Krists Neilands

Stages 2 & 4, Krists Neilands

Stage 3 Tour de Korea, Ben Perry
Israel National Time Trial championship, Guy Niv
Latvia National Time Trial championship, Krists Neilands
Israel National Road Race championship, Guy Sagiv
Overall Tour of Austria, Ben Hermans

Stage 4, Ben Hermans

Stage 3 Tour de Wallonie, Davide Cimolai
Overall Tour of Utah, Ben Hermans

Stages 2 & 3

Arnhem–Veenendaal Classic, Zak Dempster
Grand Prix de Wallonie, Krists Neilands
Prologue Tour of Taihu Lake, Matthias Brändle
Binche–Chimay–Binche, Tom Van Asbroeck

== 2020 – Israel Start-Up Nation ==
Stage 1 Vuelta a San Juan, Rudy Barbier
Stage 1 Tour of Antalya, Mihkel Räim
Le Samyn, Hugo Hofstetter
Estonia National Road Race championship, Norman Vahtra
Austria National Time Trial championship, Matthias Brändle
Stage 4 Okolo Slovenska, Rudy Barbier
Stage 8 Giro d'Italia, Alex Dowsett
Stage 3 Vuelta a España, Dan Martin
Israel National Time Trial championship, Guy Sagiv
Israel National Road Race championship, Omer Goldstein

== 2021 – Israel Start-Up Nation ==
Stage 2 Tour des Alpes-Maritimes et du Var, Michael Woods
Stage 6 Tirreno–Adriatico, Mads Würtz Schmidt
Stage 1b (TTT) Settimana Internazionale di Coppi e Bartali (Note: The winning riders were Guy Niv, Matthias Brändle, Alex Dowsett, Alessandro De Marchi, Sebastian Berwick, James Piccoli and Ben Hermans)
Stage 4 Tour de Romandie, Michael Woods
Trofeo Alcúdia – Port d'Alcúdia, André Greipel
Stage 4 Vuelta a Andalucía, André Greipel
Stage 17 Giro d'Italia, Dan Martin
Israel National Time Trial championship, Omer Goldstein
Austria National Time Trial championship, Matthias Brändle
Denmark National Road Race championship, Mads Würtz Schmidt
Giro dell'Appennino, Ben Hermans
Overall Arctic Race of Norway, Ben Hermans

Stage 3, Ben Hermans

Stage 4 (ITT) Tour Poitou-Charentes en Nouvelle-Aquitaine, Ben Hermans
Canada National Road Race championship, Guillaume Boivin
Stage 4 Okolo Slovenska, Itamar Einhorn
Tre Valli Varesine, Alessandro De Marchi

== 2022 – Israel–Premier Tech ==
Stage 2 O Gran Camiño, Michael Woods
Overall Presidential Tour of Turkey, Patrick Bevin

Stage 7, Patrick Bevin

Stage 3 Tour de Romandie, Patrick Bevin
Mercan'Tour Classic, Jakob Fuglsang
Stage 4 Tour de Suisse, Daryl Impey
Overall Route d'Occitanie, Michael Woods

Stage 3, Michael Woods

Israel National Time Trial championship, Omer Goldstein
Israel National Road Race championship, Itamar Einhorn
Stage 5 Tour de France, Simon Clarke
Stage 16 Tour de France, Hugo Houle
Stage 1 Vuelta a Castilla y León, Giacomo Nizzolo
Maryland Cycling Classic, Sep Vanmarcke
Stage 1 Tour of Britain, Corbin Strong

== 2023 – Israel–Premier Tech ==
Tro-Bro Léon, Giacomo Nizzolo
Overall Route d'Occitanie, Michael Woods

Stage 3, Michael Woods

Canada National Time Trial Championship, Derek Gee
Israel National Road Race Championship, Itamar Einhorn
Stage 9 Tour de France, Michael Woods
Stage 1 Czech Tour, Itamar Einhorn
Overall Arctic Race of Norway, Stephen Williams

Stage 3, Stephen Williams

Stage 1 Tour de Luxembourg, Corbin Strong
Stage 2 Tour of Hainan, Sebastian Berwick
Paris–Tours, Riley Sheehan

== 2024 – Israel–Premier Tech ==
Overall Tour Down Under, Stephen Williams

Stage 6, Stephen Williams

Stage 3 Tour de la Provence, Tom Van Asbroeck
Stage 1 Tour des Alpes-Maritimes, Ethan Vernon
Overall Tour du Rwanda, Joseph Blackmore

Stages 2 & 6, Itamar Einhorn
Stages 6 & 8, Joseph Blackmore

Overall Tour de Taiwan, Joseph Blackmore

Stages 1 & 5, Itamar Einhorn
Stage 2, Mason Hollyman

Stage 1 Volta a Catalunya, Nick Schultz
La Flèche Wallonne, Stephen Williams
Stage 3 Critérium du Dauphiné, Derek Gee
Israel National Time Trial Championship, Oded Kogut
Israel National Road Race Championship, Oded Kogut
Canada National Road Race Championship, Michael Woods
Stage 2a Sibiu Cycling Tour, Riley Pickrell
Stage 13 Vuelta a España, Michael Woods

== 2025 – Israel–Premier Tech ==
Overall O Gran Camiño, Derek Gee

Stage 3 (ITT), Derek Gee

== 2026 – NSN Cycling Team ==
Stage 4 2026 Tour Down Under, Ethan Vernon
Stage 1 Volta a la Comunitat Valenciana, Biniam Girmay
2026 Clásica de Almería, Biniam Girmay
New Zealand National Road Race Championship, George Bennett

== Supplementary statistics ==
Grand Tours by highest finishing position
Race	2017	2018	2019	2020	2021	2022	2023
Giro d'Italia	–	45	71	48	10	92	22
Tour de France	–	–	–	41	40	24	35
Vuelta a España	–	–	–	4	86	34	–
Major week-long stage races by highest finishing position
Race	2017	2018	2019	2020	2021	2022	2023
Tour Down Under	–	–	–	25	NH		13
Paris–Nice	–	–	–	DNF (Note: The team pulled its remaining riders out of the race before stage 7, citing concerns over the growing spread of COVID-19.)	21	13	30
Tirreno–Adriatico	–	93	39	26	17	41	20
Volta a Catalunya	–	16	–	NH	11	47	6
Tour of the Basque Country	–	–	–	NH	20	13	–
Tour of the Alps	–	13	–	NH	15	51	16
Tour de Romandie	–	–	–	NH	5	17	55
Critérium du Dauphiné	–	–	–	60	19	53	–
Tour de Suisse	–	–	–	NH	5	3	9
Tour de Pologne	–	–	–	40	36	24	–
Benelux Tour	–	–	–	19	16	NH (Note: The race was cancelled due to an overcrowded calendar.)	24
Monument races by highest finishing position
Monument	2017	2018	2019	2020	2021	2022	2023
Milan–San Remo	–	23	22	40	43	18	27
Tour of Flanders	–	–	–	19	5	DNS (Note: The team pulled its riders out of the race before the start, after their classics team got COVID-19.)	23
Paris–Roubaix	–	–	–	NH	8	36	16
Liège–Bastogne–Liège	–	–	–	11	5	10	12
Giro di Lombardia	–	36	39	9	9	53	12
Classics by highest finishing position
Classic	2017	2018	2019	2020	2021	2022	2023
Omloop Het Nieuwsblad	85	–	–	37	3	11	10
Kuurne–Brussels–Kuurne	31	7	12	6	5	5	16
Strade Bianche	–	–	–	34	59	26	28
E3 Harelbeke	–	–	28	NH	30	38	12
Gent–Wevelgem	77	–	–	24	31	55	3
Amstel Gold Race	–	39	20	NH	21	16	20
La Flèche Wallonne	–	–	63	5	4	6	4
Clásica de San Sebastián	–	–	–	NH	29	22	19

Legend
—	Did not compete
DNF	Did not finish
DNS	Did not start
NH	Not held

== See also ==
- Cycling in Israel
