= List of wins by BKCP–Powerplus and its successors =

This is a list of victories of the Alpecin–Premier Tech cycling team. The races are categorized according to the UCI Continental Circuits rules. The team was in the UCI Continental category from 2008 to 2018 then up to UCI Professional Continental from 2019 till present.

== Cyclo-cross ==
=== 2009 BKCP–Powerplus ===
world championships, Niels Albert
U23 world championships, Philipp Walsleben
Germany cyclo-cross championships, Philipp Walsleben
Duinencross Koksijde, Niels Albert
Superprestige Diegem, Niels Albert
Cyclo-cross Gavere, Niels Albert
Krawatencross, Niels Albert
Grand Prix Nommay, Niels Albert
Vlaamse Druivenveldrit Overijse, Niels Albert
Cyklokros Plzeň, Niels Albert
Grand Prix Lago le Bandie, Niels Albert

=== 2010 BKCP–Powerplus ===
U23 world championships, Arnaud Jouffroy
Germany cyclo-cross Championships, Philipp Walsleben
Superprestige Diegem, Niels Albert
Grand Prix Adri van der Poel, Niels Albert
Ziklokross Igorre, Niels Albert
Duinencross Koksijde, Niels Albert
Azencross, Niels Albert
Scheldecross Antwerpen, Radomír Šimůnek, Jr.
Cyklokros Tábor, Radomír Šimůnek, Jr.

=== 2011 BKCP–Powerplus ===
Belgium cyclo-cross Championships, Niels Albert
Germany cyclo-cross Championships, Philipp Walsleben
Overall Cyclo-cross World Cup, Niels Albert
Tervuren, Niels Albert
Grand Prix Adri van der Poel, Niels Albert
Sluitingsprijs Oostmalle, Niels Albert
Kalmthout, Niels Albert
Cyclo-cross Ruddervoorde, Niels Albert
Zonhoven, Niels Albert
Dottignies, Niels Albert
Superprestige Diegem, Niels Albert
Azencross, Niels Albert

=== 2012 BKCP–Powerplus ===
world championships, Niels Albert
Germany cyclo-cross championships, Philipp Walsleben
Sluitingsprijs Oostmalle, Niels Albert
Cyclo-cross Ronse, Niels Albert
Cyklokros Plzeň, Niels Albert
Azencross, Niels Albert
Superprestige Diegem, Niels Albert

=== 2013 BKCP–Powerplus ===
Germany cyclo-cross championships, Philipp Walsleben
Overall UCI Cyclo-cross World Cup, Niels Albert
Krawatencross, Niels Albert
Sluitingsprijs Oostmalle, Niels Albert
Bollekescross, Niels Albert
Duinencross Koksijde, Niels Albert
Superprestige Gieten, Niels Albert
Memorial Romano Scotti, Niels Albert

=== 2014 BKCP–Powerplus ===
Germany cyclo-cross championships, Philipp Walsleben
Superprestige Gieten, Mathieu van der Poel
Sluitingsprijs Oostmalle, Niels Albert
Superprestige Gieten, Mathieu van der Poel
Superprestige Diegem, Mathieu van der Poel

== Road cycling ==
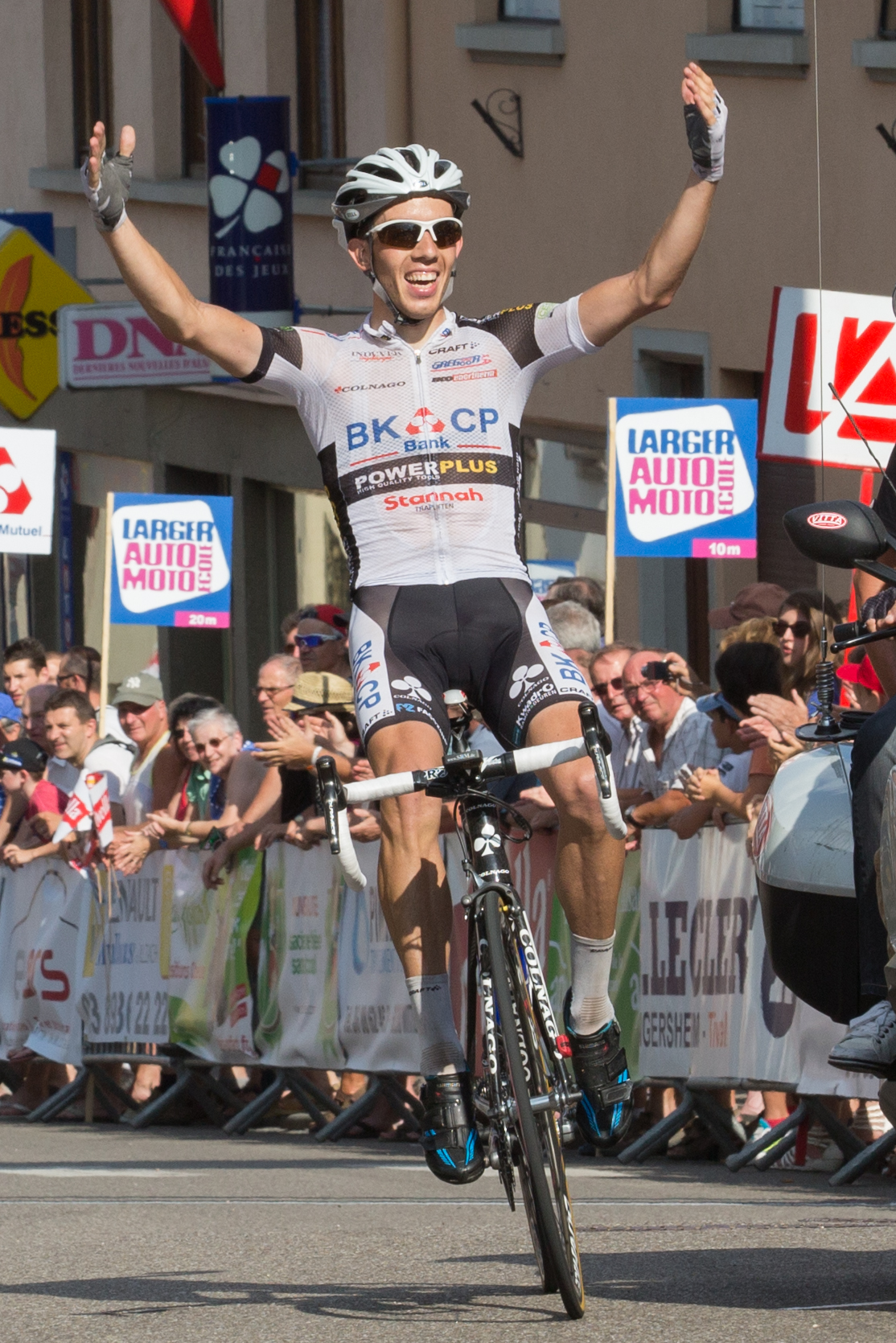
Philipp Walsleben winning the third stage of the 2013 Tour Alsace.

=== 2009 BKCP–Powerplus ===
Prologue Boucles de la Mayenne, Niels Albert
Stage 2 & 5 Tour Alsace, Niels Albert
Stage 1 Mi-Août Bretonne, Niels Albert

=== 2010 BKCP–Powerplus ===
Stage 6 Circuito Montañés, Niels Albert

=== 2011 BKCP–Powerplus ===
Stage 2 Tour Alsace, Niels Albert
Stage 3 Mi-Août Bretonne, Philipp Walsleben

=== 2012 BKCP–Powerplus ===
Stage 4 Mi-Août Bretonne, Marcel Meisen

=== 2013 BKCP–Powerplus ===
Stage 3 Boucles de la Mayenne, Marcel Meisen
Stage 3 Tour Alsace, Philipp Walsleben
Stage 6 Tour Alsace, Marcel Meisen
Overall Baltic Chain Tour, Philipp Walsleben

Stage 1, Philipp Walsleben
Stage 2, Marcel Meisen

=== 2014 BKCP–Powerplus ===
Ronde van Limburg, Mathieu van der Poel
Stage 3 Tour Alsace, Mathieu van der Poel
Overall Baltic Chain Tour, Mathieu van der Poel

Stage 4, Mathieu van der Poel

=== 2017 Beobank–Corendon ===
Stage 2 Tour of Belgium, Mathieu van der Poel
Overall Boucles de la Mayenne, Mathieu van der Poel

Stages 2 & 3, Mathieu van der Poel

KOGA Slag om Norg, Gianni Vermeersch
Dwars door het Hageland, Mathieu van der Poel

=== 2018 Corendon–Circus ===
Overall Boucles de la Mayenne, Mathieu van der Poel

Stage 1, Mathieu van der Poel

Ronde van Limburg, Mathieu van der Poel
Netherlands National Road Race Championships, Mathieu van der Poel
Stage 1 Tour Alsace, David van der Poel
Stages 1 & 4 Arctic Race of Norway, Mathieu van der Poel
Stage 3 Arctic Race of Norway, Adam Toupalik

=== 2019 Corendon–Circus ===
Stage 1 Tour of Antalya, Mathieu van der Poel
Stage 4 Tour of Antalya, Roy Jans
Grand Prix de Denain, Mathieu van der Poel
Dwars door Vlaanderen, Mathieu van der Poel
Stage 1 Circuit Cycliste Sarthe - Pays de la Loire, Mathieu van der Poel
Brabantse Pijl, Mathieu van der Poel
Amstel Gold Race, Mathieu van der Poel
Elfstedenronde, Tim Merlier
Halle Ingooigem, Dries De Bondt
Belgium National Road Race Championships, Tim Merlier
Stage 1 Arctic Race of Norway, Mathieu van der Poel
Prologue TTT Tour Alsace
Stages 1 & 4 Tour Alsace, Tim Merlier
Stage 3 Danmark Rundt, Lasse Norman Hansen
Stage 5 Danmark Rundt, Tim Merlier
Overall Tour of Britain, Mathieu van der Poel

Stages 4, 7 & 8 Mathieu van der Poel

Memorial Rik Van Steenbergen, Dries De Bondt

=== 2020 Alpecin–Fenix ===
Stage 3 Étoile de Bessèges, Dries De Bondt
Stage 4 Tour of Antalya, Tim Merlier
Dwars door het Hageland, Jonas Rickaert
Overall Tour Bitwa Warszawska 1920, Oscar Riesebeek

Stage 3, Senne Leysen
Stage 4, Oscar Riesebeek

Germany National Road Race Championships, Marcel Meisen
Netherlands National Road Race Championships, Mathieu van der Poel
Brussels Cycling Classic, Tim Merlier
Stage 6 Tirreno–Adriatico, Tim Merlier
Stage 7 Tirreno–Adriatico, Mathieu van der Poel
Antwerp Port Epic, Gianni Vermeersch
Belgium National Road Race Championships, Dries De Bondt
Overall BinckBank Tour, Mathieu van der Poel

Stage 5, Mathieu van der Poel

Tour of Flanders, Mathieu van der Poel

=== 2021 Alpecin–Fenix ===
Stage 1 UAE Tour, Mathieu van der Poel
Le Samyn, Tim Merlier
Strade Bianche, Mathieu van der Poel
Grote Prijs Jean-Pierre Monseré, Tim Merlier
Stages 3 & 5 Tirreno–Adriatico, Mathieu van der Poel
Bredene Koksijde Classic, Tim Merlier
Scheldeprijs, Jasper Philipsen
Stages 6 & 7 Presidential Tour of Turkey, Jasper Philipsen
Stage 2 Giro d'Italia, Tim Merlier
Ronde van Limburg, Tim Merlier
Stage 1 Boucles de la Mayenne, Philipp Walsleben
Elfstedenronde, Tim Merlier
Stages 2 & 3 Tour de Suisse, Mathieu van der Poel
Switzerland National Road Race Championships, Silvan Dillier
Stage 2 Tour de France, Mathieu van der Poel
Stage 3 Tour de France, Tim Merlier
Stage 1 Vuelta a Burgos, Edward Planckaert
Stage 4 Arctic Race of Norway, Philipp Walsleben
Stages 2 & 5 Vuelta a España, Jasper Philipsen
Stages 1 & 4 Benelux Tour, Tim Merlier
Antwerp Port Epic, Mathieu van der Poel
Stage 3 Tour de Luxembourg, Sacha Modolo
Kampioenschap van Vlaanderen, Jasper Philipsen
Eschborn–Frankfurt, Jasper Philipsen
Grand Prix de Denain, Jasper Philipsen
Paris-Chauny, Jasper Philipsen
Giro del Veneto, Xandro Meurisse

=== 2022 Alpecin–Fenix ===
Stage 4 Tour of Antalya, Jakub Mareczko
Stages 1 & 5 UAE Tour, Jasper Philipsen
Stage 2 Tirreno–Adriatico, Tim Merlier
Nokere Koerse, Tim Merlier
Classic Brugge–De Panne, Tim Merlier
Stage 4 Settimana Internazionale di Coppi e Bartali, Mathieu van der Poel
Dwars door Vlaanderen, Mathieu van der Poel
Tour of Flanders, Mathieu van der Poel
Stage 3 Tour of Turkey, Jasper Philipsen
Four Days of Dunkirk

Stage 4, Lionel Taminiaux
Stage 5, Gianni Vermeersch

Giro d'Italia

Stage 1, Mathieu van der Poel
Stage 12, Stefano Oldani
Stage 18, Dries De Bondt

Stage 3 ZLM Tour, Jakub Mareczko
Dwars door het Hageland, Oscar Riesebeek
Stage 2 Tour of Belgium, Jasper Philipsen
Germany National U23 Time Trial Championships, Maurice Ballerstedt
Belgium National Road Race Championships, Tim Merlier
Stages 15 & 21 Tour de France, Jasper Philipsen
Overall Tour de Wallonie, Robert Stannard
Stage 4 Danmark Rundt, Jasper Philipsen
Stage 6 & 8 Vuelta a España, Jay Vine
Grand Prix de Wallonie, Mathieu van der Poel
Omloop van het Houtland, Jasper Philipsen
Coppa Ugo Agostoni, Sjoerd Bax
Paris–Bourges, Jasper Philipsen
Memorial Rik Van Steenbergen, Tim Merlier
Tour de Langkawi

Stage 4, Jakub Mareczko
Stage 5, Lionel Taminiaux
Stage 7, Sjoerd Bax

=== 2023 Alpecin–Deceuninck ===
Stages 3 & 7 Tirreno–Adriatico, Jasper Philipsen
Milan–San Remo, Mathieu van der Poel
Classic Brugge–De Panne, Jasper Philipsen
Stages 4 & 6 Volta a Catalunya, Kaden Groves
Volta Limburg Classic, Kaden Groves
Scheldeprijs, Jasper Philipsen
Paris–Roubaix, Mathieu van der Poel
Eschborn–Frankfurt, Søren Kragh Andersen
Stage 5 Giro d'Italia, Kaden Groves
Antwerp Port Epic, Dries De Bondt
Stage 2 ZLM Tour, Jakub Mareczko
Elfstedenronde, Jasper Philipsen
Overall Tour of Belgium, Mathieu van der Poel

Stage 1, Jasper Philipsen
Stage 4, Mathieu van der Poel

Points classification Tour de France, Jasper Philipsen

Stages 3, 4, 7 & 11, Jasper Philipsen

Stage 3 Tour de Wallonie, Timo Kielich
Stage 1 Renewi Tour, Jasper Philipsen
Stage 4, 5 & 21 Vuelta a España, Kaden Groves
Kampioenschap van Vlaanderen, Jasper Philipsen
Super 8 Classic, Mathieu van der Poel
Points classification Vuelta a España, Kaden Groves

=== 2024 Alpecin–Deceuninck ===
Stage 2 Étoile de Bessèges, Axel Laurance
Stage 2 Tirreno–Adriatico, Jasper Philipsen
Milan–San Remo, Jasper Philipsen
Classic Brugge–De Panne, Jasper Philipsen
E3 Saxo Classic, Mathieu van der Poel
Stage 5 Volta a Catalunya, Axel Laurance
Volta NXT Classic, Timo Kielich
Tour of Flanders, Mathieu van der Poel
Stage 3 Tour of the Basque Country, Quinten Hermans
Paris–Roubaix, Mathieu van der Poel
Overall Tour of Norway, Axel Laurance

Stage 2, Axel Laurance

Dwars door het Hageland, Gianni Vermeersch
Stage 3 Tour of Belgium, Jasper Philipsen
Stages 1 & 5 Tour of Qinghai Lake, Jensen Plowright
Stages 10, 13 & 16 Tour de France, Jasper Philipsen
Stages 2, 14 & 17 Vuelta a España, Kaden Groves
Stage 4 Renewi Tour, Jasper Philipsen
Stage 1 Tour de Luxembourg, Mathieu van der Poel
Münsterland Giro, Jasper Philipsen
Coppa Bernocchi, Stan Van Tricht

=== 2025 Alpecin–Deceuninck ===
Kuurne–Brussels–Kuurne, Jasper Philipsen
Le Samyn, Mathieu van der Poel
Milan–San Remo, Mathieu van der Poel
E3 Saxo Classic, Mathieu van der Poel
Paris–Roubaix, Mathieu van der Poel
Stage 1 Presidential Tour of Turkey, Simon Dehairs
Stage 2 Presidential Tour of Turkey, Tibor del Grosso
Stage 6 Giro d'Italia, Kaden Groves
Antwerp Port Epic, Timo Kielich
Stage 2 Tour of Belgium, Jasper Philipsen
Stage 1 Tour de France, Jasper Philipsen
Stage 2 Tour de France, Mathieu van der Poel
Stage 20 Tour de France, Kaden Groves
Stage 3 Renewi Tour, Mathieu van der Poel
Stages 1, 8 & 19 Vuelta a España, Jasper Philipsen
Münsterland Giro, Jasper Philipsen

=== 2026 Alpecin–Premier Tech ===
Stage 3 Étoile de Bessèges, Henri Uhlig
1st Nokere Koerse, Jasper Philipsen

== Supplementary statistics ==
Grand Tours by highest finishing position
| Race | 2019 | 2020 | 2021 | 2022 | 2023 | 2024 | 2025 | 2026 |
| Giro d'Italia | – | – | 20 | 57 | 45 | 23 | 85 | 80 |
| Tour de France | – | – | 29 | 60 | 57 | 99 | 22 | 75 |
| Vuelta a España | – | – | 48 | 39 | 112 | 55 | 101 | |
Major week-long stage races by highest finishing position
| Race | 2019 | 2020 | 2021 | 2022 | 2023 | 2024 | 2025 | 2026 |
| Tour Down Under | – | – | NH | | 36 | 17 | 27 | 21 |
| Paris–Nice | – | – | 40 | 33 | 44 | 36 | 22 | 18 |
| Tirreno–Adriatico | – | 16 | 32 | 42 | 49 | 46 | 50 | 40 |
| Volta a Catalunya | – | NH | – | – | 58 | 79 | 86 | 18 |
| Tour of the Basque Country | – | NH | – | – | 52 | 28 | 16 | 20 |
| Tour de Romandie | – | NH | – | – | 38 | 26 | 62 | – |
| Tour Auvergne-Rhône-Alpes | – | – | – | – | 51 | 47 | 50 | 13 |
| Tour de Suisse | – | NH | 17 | DNF (Note: The team did not start Stage 6 due to a positive Covid test.) | 50 | 53 | 32 | 51 |
| Tour de Pologne | – | – | 9 | DNF (Note: The team did not start Stage 4 due to five positive Covid tests.) | 21 | 51 | 16 | 24 |
| Benelux Tour | – | 1 | 14 | NH (Note: The Organisers cancelled the 2022 edition due to an "overcrowded" calendar.) | 10 | 6 | 2 | 1 |
Monuments by highest finishing position
| Monument | 2019 | 2020 | 2021 | 2022 | 2023 | 2024 | 2025 | 2026 |
| Milan–San Remo | – | 13 | 5 | 3 | 1 | 1 | 1 | 8 |
| Tour of Flanders | 4 | 1 | 2 | 1 | 2 | 1 | 3 | 2 |
| Paris–Roubaix | – | NH | 3 | 9 | 1 | 1 | 1 | 4 |
| Liège–Bastogne–Liège | – | 6 | 51 | 17 | 48 | 3 | 14 | 4 |
| Il Lombardia | – | 10 | 21 | 37 | 29 | 10 | 37 | |
Classics by highest finishing position
| Classic | 2019 | 2020 | 2021 | 2022 | 2023 | 2024 | 2025 | 2026 |
| Omloop Het Nieuwsblad | 27 | 24 | 14 | 31 | 33 | 18 | 3 | 1 |
| Kuurne–Brussels–Kuurne | – | 25 | 12 | 12 | 14 | 92 | 1 | 18 |
| Strade Bianche | – | 15 | 1 | 12 | 15 | 32 | 7 | 26 |
| E3 Saxo Classic | – | NH | 3 | 14 | 2 | 1 | 1 | 1 |
| Gent–Wevelgem | 4 | 9 | 10 | 6 | 24 | 2 | 44 | 1 |
| Dwars door Vlaanderen | 1 | NH | 3 | 1 | 4 | 15 | 6 | 8 |
| Amstel Gold Race | 1 | NH | 7 | 4 | 14 | 22 | 16 | 5 |
| Brabantse Pijl | 1 | 2 | 9 | 10 | 11 | 6 | 10 | 14 |
| La Flèche Wallonne | – | 22 | 12 | 35 | 19 | 18 | 30 | 25 |
| Clásica de San Sebastián | – | NH | – | – | 16 | 56 | 10 | 20 |
| Paris–Tours | – | 6 | 12 | 19 | 17 | 3 | 39 | |

Legend
| — | Did not compete |
| DNF | Did not finish |
| NH | Not held |
