= Julian Alaphilippe =

French bicycle racer (born 1992)

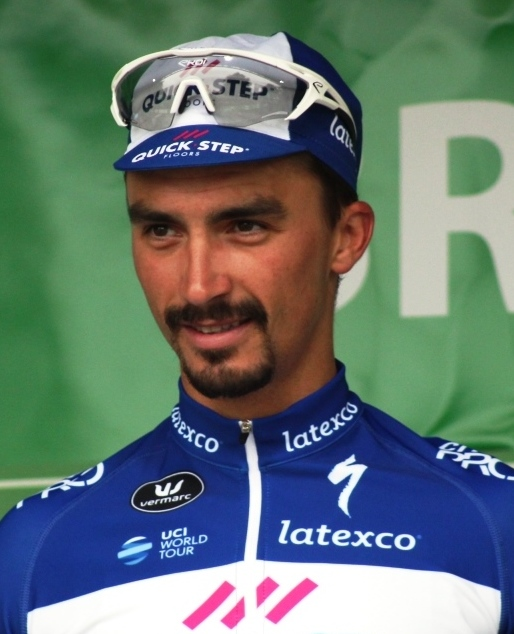
- Alaphilippe at the 2018 Tour of Britain

Personal information
- Full name: Julian Alaphilippe
- Nickname: Loulou
- Born: 11 June 1992 (age 34) Saint-Amand-Montrond, France
- Height: 1.73 m (5 ft 8 in)
- Weight: 62 kg (137 lb)

Cycling career
- Sport: Cycling
- Current team: Tudor Pro Cycling Team
- Disciplines: Road; Cyclo-cross
- Role: Rider
- Rider type: Puncheur

Amateur team
- 2012: Armée de Terre

Professional teams
- 2013: Etixx–IHNed
- 2014–2024: Omega Pharma–Quick-Step
- 2025–: Tudor Pro Cycling Team

Major wins
- Grand Tours Tour de France Mountains classification (2018) 6 individual stages (2018–2021) Combativity award (2019) Giro d'Italia 1 individual stage (2024) Combativity award (2024) Vuelta a España 1 individual stage (2017) Stage races Tour of California (2016) Tour of Britain (2018) One-day races and Classics World Road Race Championships (2020, 2021) Milan–San Remo (2019) La Flèche Wallonne (2018, 2019, 2021) Clásica de San Sebastián (2018) Strade Bianche (2019) GP de Québec (2025) Brabantse Pijl (2020) Ardèche Classic (2023) Other Vélo d'Or (2019)
Medal record
Representing France
Men's road bicycle racing
World Championships
Gold medal – first place	2020 Imola	Elite road race
Gold medal – first place	2021 Flanders	Elite road race
European Championships
Silver medal – second place	2016 Plumelec	Elite road race
Men's cyclo-cross
World Championships
Silver medal – second place	2010 Tábor	Junior
European Championships
Bronze medal – third place	2012 Ipswich	Under-23

Julian Alaphilippe (French pronunciation: [ʒyljɑ̃ alafilip]; born 11 June 1992) is a French professional former road cyclist, former cyclo-cross racer and two-time UCI World Road Champion, who last rode for UCI ProTeam Tudor Pro Cycling Team. He is the brother of racing cyclist Bryan Alaphilippe.

== Career ==
=== Early career ===
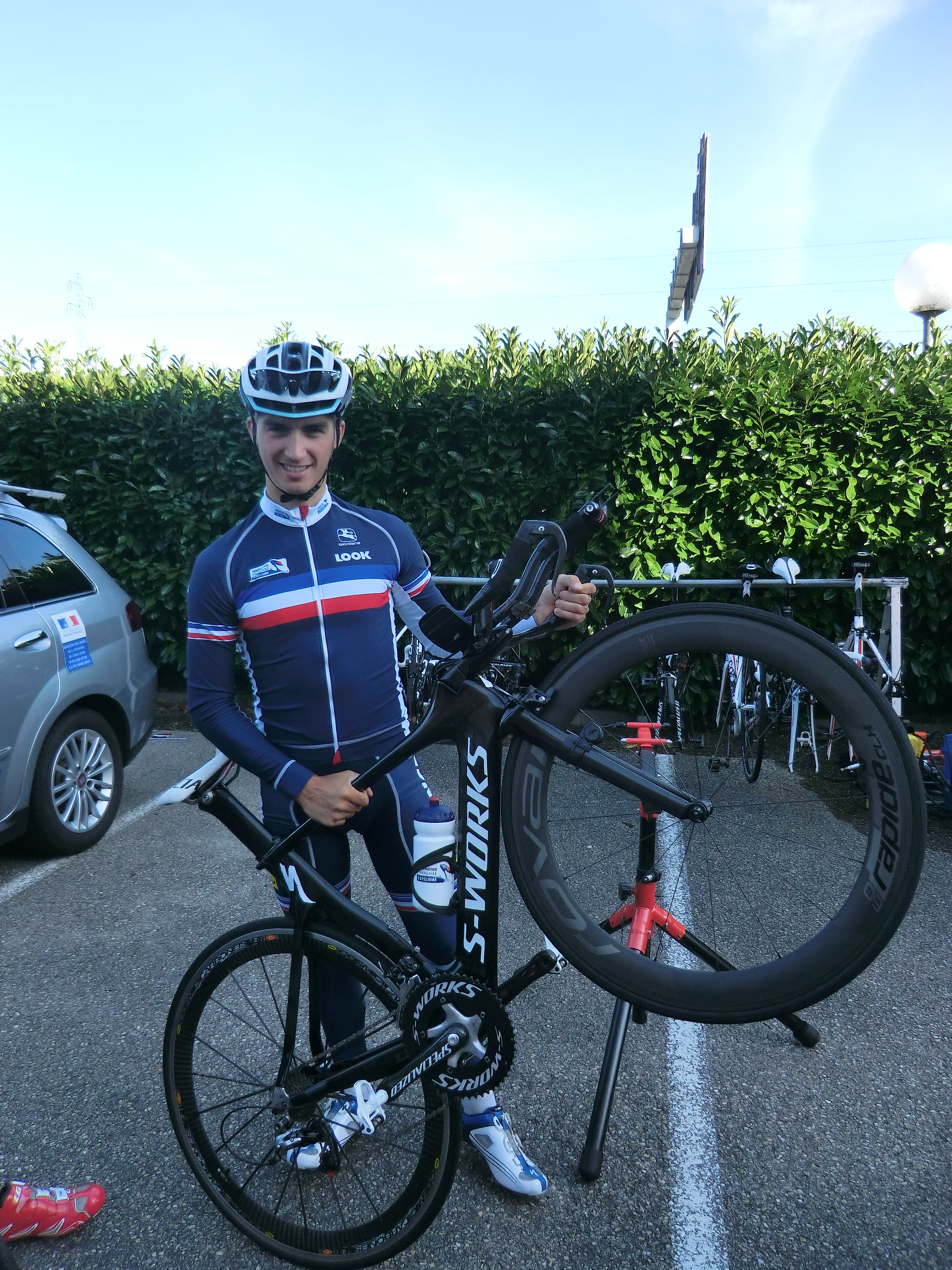
Alaphilippe in 2013

Born in Saint-Amand-Montrond, Alaphilippe started his career competing in the cyclo-cross discipline and finished second in the Junior World Cyclo-Cross Championships in 2010.

Alaphilippe's road career began in 2012, riding with amateur team Armée de Terre. During that season, he impressed at the Tour de Bretagne, finishing eleventh overall, and finished second overall and won a stage in the Coupe des nations Ville Saguenay, a UCI America Tour 2.2 event.

Alaphilippe joined Etixx–IHNed, the development team of UCI WorldTeam Omega Pharma–Quick-Step. The young rider had an even more successful season in 2013, taking a solo victory on stage 4 of the Tour de Bretagne. Later in the year, he came 4th in the European Road Race Championships and 9th in the UCI Road World Under-23 Championships. He also won the final stage and the points classification of the Tour de l'Avenir, the Grand Prix Südkärnten, and a stage at the Thüringen Rundfahrt der U23.

=== Omega Pharma–Quick-Step (2014–2024) ===
==== 2014 ====
Alaphilippe joined Omega Pharma–Quick-Step in 2014. He made his professional debut in January, at the Tour Down Under, and obtained his first podium in the professional ranks on the opening stage of the Volta a Catalunya. He was also second in Stage 5. Alaphilippe scored his first victory as a neo-pro in Stage 4 of the Tour de l'Ain, where he showed his explosiveness in an uphill finish ahead of Dan Martin, just days after another top 3 finish, at the RideLondon–Surrey Classic.

His best World Tour result of the year in a one-day race was a fifth-place finish from a seven-man group in the GP Ouest–France.

==== 2015 ====
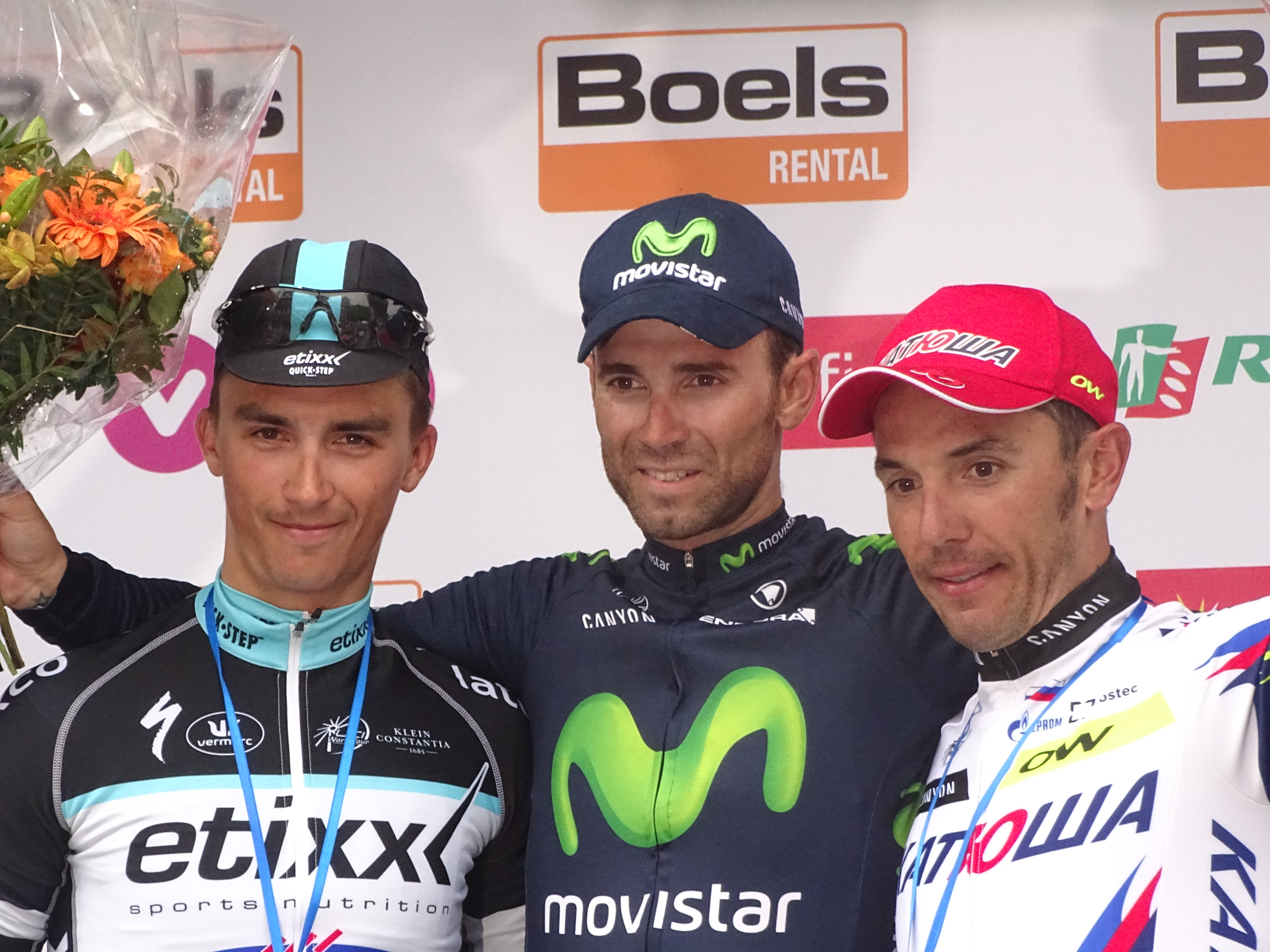
Alaphilippe (left) on the podium of the 2015 Liège–Bastogne–Liège, along with Alejandro Valverde (centre) and Joaquim Rodríguez

2015 was a breakthrough year for Alaphilippe. After two top-10 finishes at the Volta a Catalunya, he rode in a supporting role at the Ardennes classics to help his teammate, the reigning world champion Michał Kwiatkowski, and finished 7th in the Amstel Gold Race behind winner Kwiatkowski. In La Flèche Wallonne, his first time participating in the race, he continued to support Kwiatkowski but found his teammate too far behind at a crucial juncture. His team director told him to go for the win and he finished second on the Mur de Huy behind three-time winner Alejandro Valverde. The scenario repeated itself at Liège–Bastogne–Liège a few days later, when Alaphilippe finished second in his La Doyenne debut, again behind Valverde. In doing so, Alaphilippe recorded the best French performance at the race since Laurent Jalabert's runner-up finish in 1998.

After those performances and a string of podium finishes in the Tour de Romandie, Alaphilippe signed a two-year contract extension in May, until the end of the 2017 season. Later in the month he won the queen stage of the Tour of California, atop Mount Baldy, and took over the lead in the general classification, two seconds ahead of Peter Sagan. However, he lost the overall eventually to Sagan by just three seconds in the last stage due to the time bonuses in a bunch sprint. In the later part of the summer, he finished eighth at the Clásica de San Sebastián, finishing in the lead group behind the winner, Adam Yates. He subsequently finished tenth overall in the Eneco Tour, which included a stage that used many of the Ardennes classics roads. He failed to finish in the road race at the World Championships, and was later diagnosed with infectious mononucleosis – leading to extreme fatigue, and marking the end of his season.

==== 2016 ====
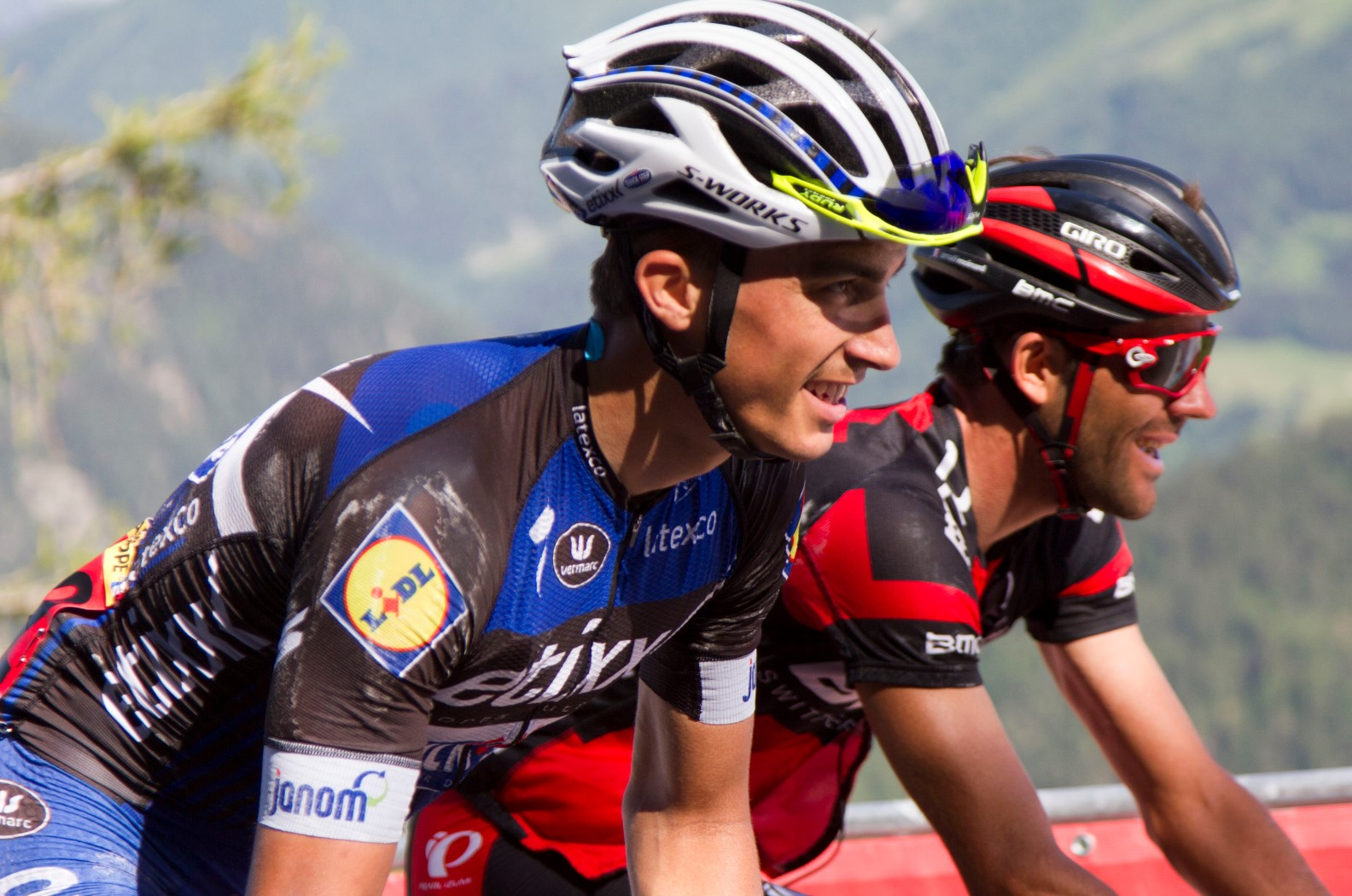
Alaphilippe (left) at the 2016 Tour de France

Alaphilippe started his season at February's Tour La Provence, and recorded his first top-ten finish of the season at April's Brabantse Pijl, before finishing sixth at the Amstel Gold Race. Later in April, Alaphilippe again placed second at La Flèche Wallonne, as he did in 2015. He then earned his biggest victory at the time, at the Tour of California, when he won a stage atop Gibraltar Road and the overall. The lead was taken on stage 3 when he attacked on a hors-catégorie climb with less than 1 kilometre (0.62 miles) left. His form continued at the Critérium du Dauphiné where he finished sixth overall and first in the young rider classification – his first white jersey at a UCI World Tour race. In late June, he was named in the start list for the Tour de France. During the Tour de France, he held the young rider classification from stages 2 to 6, after taking second in Cherbourg-en-Cotentin and won the combativity award on stage 16.

Alaphilippe was then selected to represent his nation at the Olympics in Rio de Janeiro, competing in the road race and the road time trial. During the road race, he caught up with the leading group of cyclists on the final climb of Vista Chinesa, but his crash on the descent hindered him from joining the final attack launched by Greg Van Avermaet and Jakob Fuglsang to catch the sole leader Rafał Majka before the finish line. Alaphilippe eventually finished the road race in fourth position, 22 seconds behind the winner Van Avermaet. Alaphilippe finished in 32nd position in the road time trial.

In September, he came close to winning the road race at the European Road Championships, finishing second in Plumelec.

==== 2017 ====
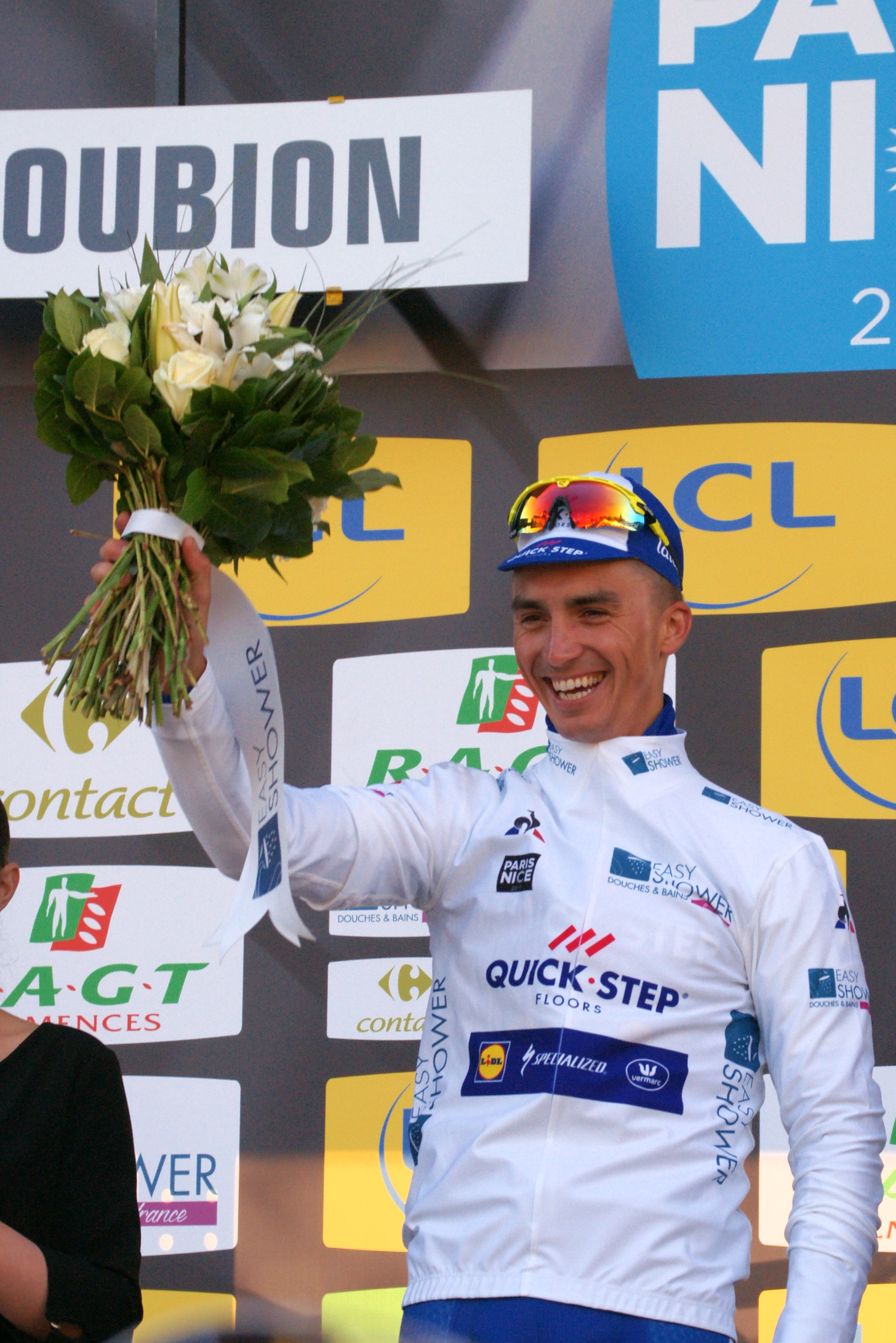
Alaphilippe, wearing the white jersey of young rider classification leader, at the 2017 Paris–Nice

Alaphilippe started his 2017 spring preparation at the Abu Dhabi Tour, where he finished fifth overall and won the best young rider classification. In March, he rode Paris–Nice and won his first career individual time trial, with an uphill finish on stage 4. He kept his race lead over the next three days, before finishing fifth overall, and won the young rider and points classifications. The following weekend, Alaphilippe finished third on his debut at Milan–San Remo, being narrowly beaten in a sprint by Michał Kwiatkowski and world champion Peter Sagan after the trio broke clear on the final climb, the Poggio di San Remo.

Alaphilippe's season was then hampered by a lengthy injury sustained at the Tour of the Basque Country. It was announced in April by his team that Alaphilippe would miss the Ardennes classics due to a pre-patellar lesion knee injury. He also missed out his primary goal of the year, the Tour de France, after undergoing knee surgery in May. Alaphilippe returned to racing at Grand Prix Pino Cerami in July, and made his debut at the Vuelta a España a month later. He scored his maiden Grand Tour stage win in Stage 8 during which he outclimbed Rafał Majka and Jan Polanc from a breakaway, on the roads to Xorret de Catí.

Also in August, Alaphilippe signed a two-year contract extension with his team Quick-Step Floors, keeping him through the 2019 season.

At the World Championships held in Bergen, he broke clear on the last climb of the race and led until under the flamme rouge, before being overhauled by the peloton and finishing tenth. One month later, Alaphilippe concluded his season at the Tour of Guangxi by taking fourth overall and the young rider classification.

==== 2018 ====
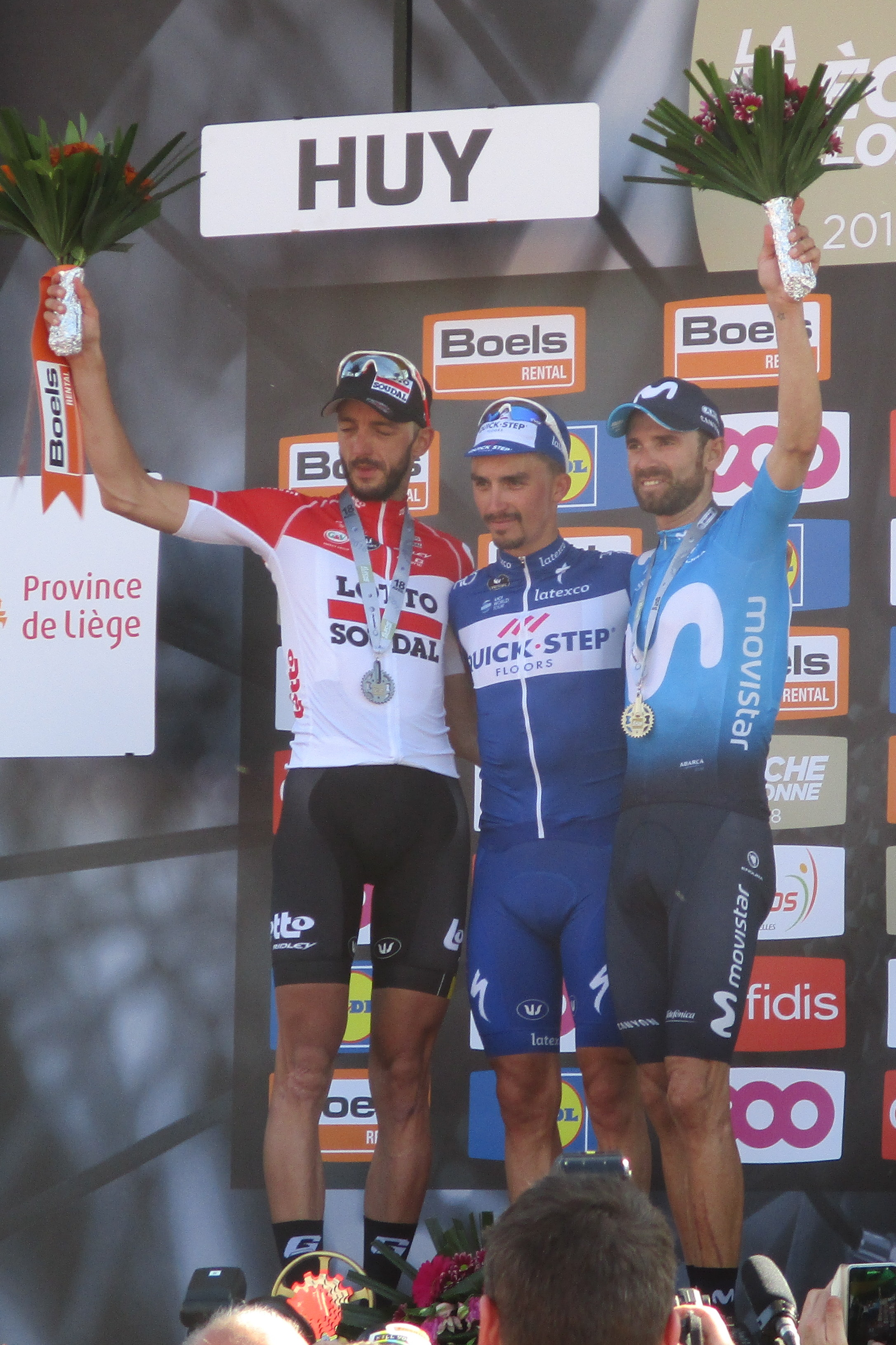
Alaphilippe on the podium at the 2018 La Fleche Wallonne

Alaphilippe started his season at the inaugural Colombia Oro y Paz and won the uphill finish to Alto Boquerón, before finishing seventh overall and as the only non-South American rider in the top 10. He then returned at the Abu Dhabi Tour and went one place better than in the previous year, taking fourth place overall after a podium finish on the final stage of the race. After a pair of top 3 finishes at Paris–Nice, he took his first victory of the season in Zarautz in the opening stage of the Tour of the Basque Country; he also won the following stage into Bermeo.

Seventh at the Amstel Gold Race, he finally scored his first one-day race victory just a couple of days later. During the third and final ascent of the Mur de Huy at La Flèche Wallonne, Alaphilippe accelerated near the summit, overtaking Jelle Vanendert in the last 100 metres (330 feet) of the race and dropping him. Alejandro Valverde, who had won the last four La Flèche Wallonne editions, staged a late fight-back and almost caught Alaphilippe, but Alaphilippe was able to kick again in the final metres to increase his lead over Valverde and eventually win the race. It was the biggest victory of Alaphilippe's career at that point, and he was the first French winner of La Flèche Wallonne since Laurent Jalabert won in 1997.

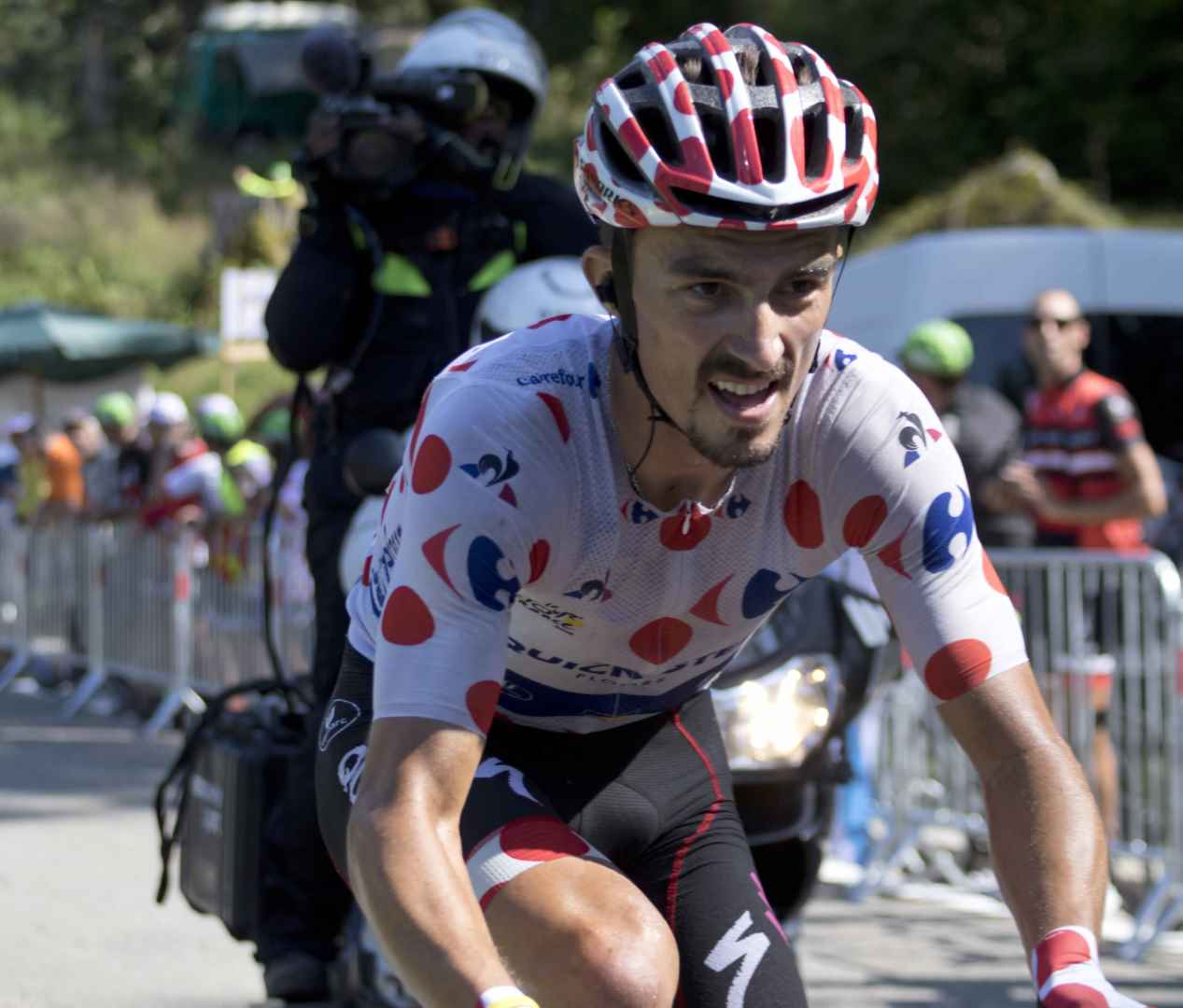
Alaphilippe wearing the polka dot jersey at the 2018 Tour de France. He ultimately won the mountains classification, and finished 33rd overall.

Alaphilippe participated in his second Tour de France after a successful Critérium du Dauphiné, where he won the stage to Lans-en-Vercors, and claimed his maiden Tour de France stage win in stage 10 with a series of attacks and aggressive descending in the Alps. He took the maximum mountains classification points on the Montée du plateau des Glières, the Col de Romme and the Col de la Colombière, finishing the stage to Le Grand-Bornand more than one minute ahead of the second-placed rider Ion Izagirre of Bahrain–Merida, and over three minutes ahead of the peloton that included the defending champion Chris Froome. Alaphilippe also took the lead in the mountains classification at the end of Stage 10. Alaphilippe won the 16th stage of the race after Adam Yates crashed while leading, on the descent 7 kilometres (4.3 miles) before the finishing line. He maintained his mountains classification lead throughout the second half of the race, finishing 79 points ahead of his closest rival.

The following month, Alaphilippe won the Clásica de San Sebastián, out-sprinting Bauke Mollema for the win, after the two riders escaped the field on the final climb, the Murgil Tontorra. He then won the third stage and the general classification of the Tour of Britain, after taking the overall lead on the sixth stage of the week long competition. Alaphilippe continued to have success in stage races, as he became the first Frenchman to win the Okolo Slovenska less than a week later. Despite his large amount of successes in 2018, Alaphilippe faced disappointment at the UCI Road World Championships in Austria, where he was appointed France's team leader. On the final climb, he cracked and lost contact with the race leaders, and ended up finishing 8th.

==== 2019 ====
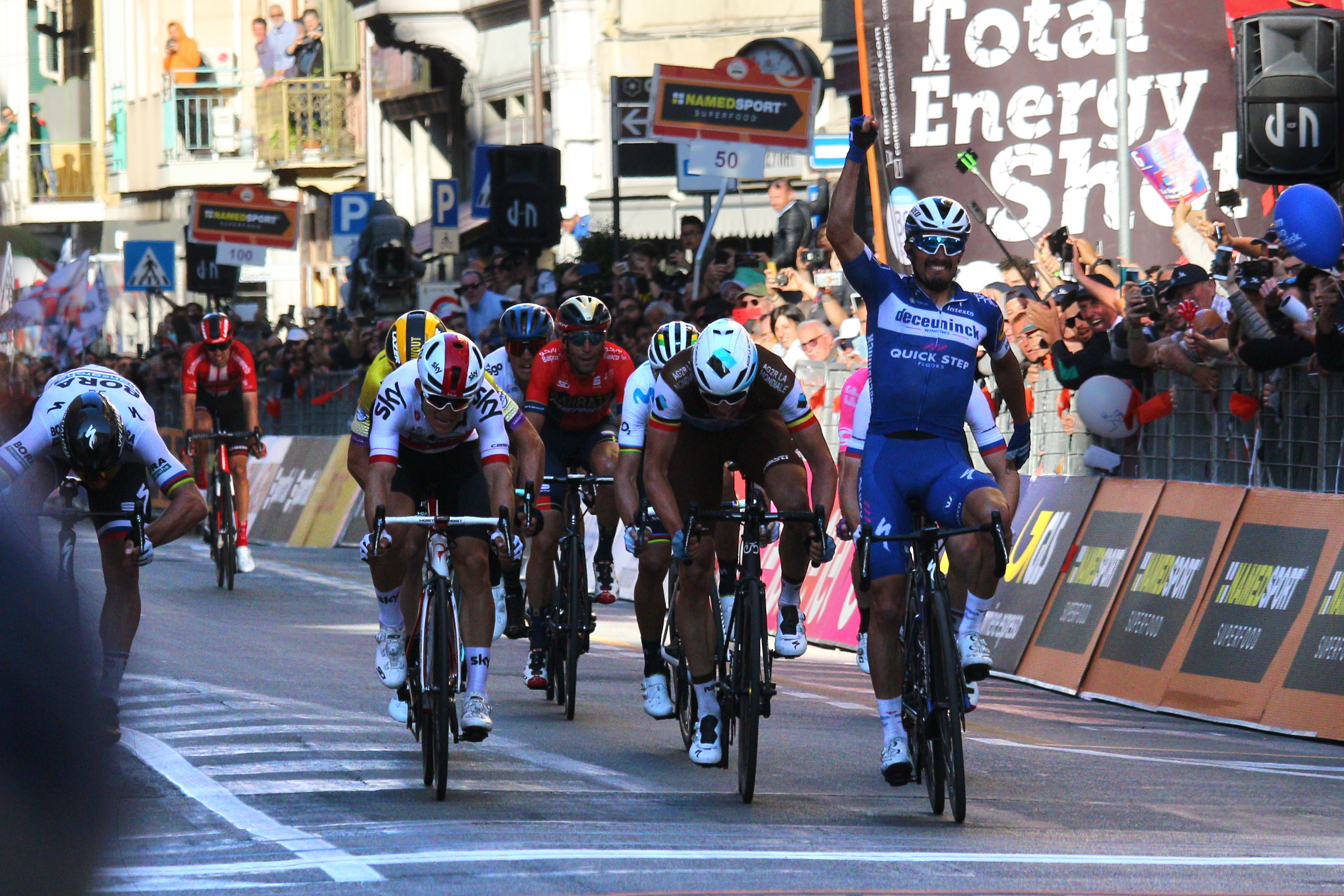
Alaphilippe celebrating victory at the 2019 Milan–San Remo

Alaphilippe started the 2019 season in January with the Vuelta a San Juan and the Tour Colombia. At the Vuelta a San Juan, he finished second overall and won two stages, one of which was an individual time trial. He then won the points classification and one stage at the Tour Colombia, from a small group. His first major race was Strade Bianche, which he won on debut, beating out Astana rider Jakob Fuglsang in a kick up the final climb of Via Santa Caterina. He finished 6th overall in Tirreno–Adriatico, taking stage 2 to Pomarance and then earning a surprise victory on stage 6 despite leading out his team's designated sprinter Elia Viviani. He then won his first Monument, at Milan–San Remo after attacking on the Poggio di San Remo and outsprinting Oliver Naesen and Michał Kwiatkowski on the Via Roma. As a result, Alaphilippe became the top-ranked rider on the UCI road racing world ranking.

This was followed up by a stage victory in the Tour of the Basque Country, a second place at Brabantse Pijl, a near-miss of a podium place at the Amstel Gold Race, and then three days later, by a successful defence of his La Flèche Wallonne title that he had won in 2018, which made him one of the few riders in history to claim back-to-back victories at the Belgian World Tour race. After a break, he resumed competition at the Critérium du Dauphiné, winning stage 6 from the breakaway, and he won the mountains classification.

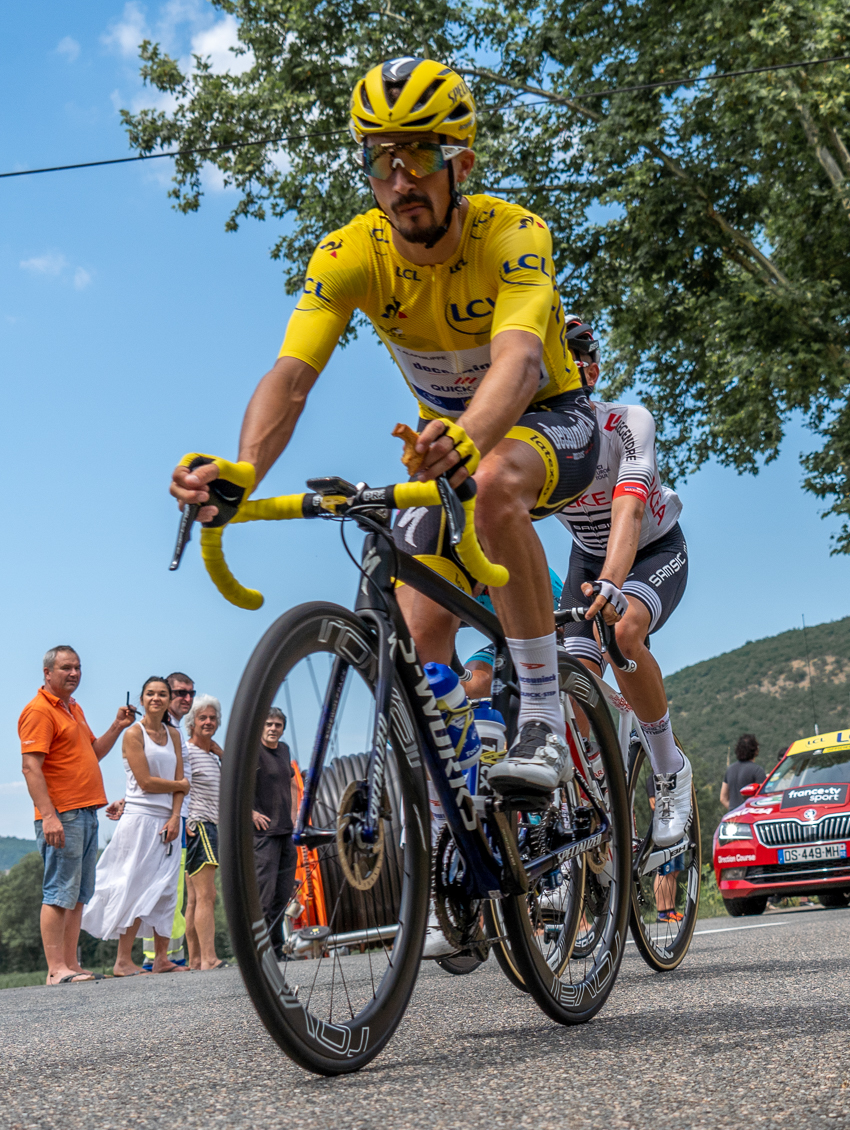
Alaphilippe at the 2019 Tour de France wearing the yellow jersey

Alaphilippe won the third stage of the Tour de France on 8 July, simultaneously earning himself the yellow jersey, after a powerful solo attack inside the last 15 kilometres (9.3 miles). After losing the jersey by six seconds on stage six to Giulio Ciccone, he regained it following stage eight, where he finished third. He then won stage 13, the individual time trial in Pau, by beating Geraint Thomas by 14 seconds on the day that celebrated 100 years since the yellow jersey was created. He kept the overall lead until stage 19 after being dropped on the Col de l'Iseran. He ultimately finished the race fifth overall; with his two stage wins, and fourteen days in yellow, he was designated as the most combative rider of the race. Seventh at the Grand Prix Cycliste de Québec in September, he finished his season with a 28th place at the UCI Road World Championships in Yorkshire.

==== 2020 ====
For the third consecutive year, Alaphilippe began his season in South America, racing the Vuelta a San Juan, which he was forced to abandon through illness after just two days, and the Tour Colombia, where he scored his first podium of the year, in Santa Rosa de Viterbo. Following the COVID-19 pandemic-enforced suspension of racing, Alaphilippe recommenced his season at August's Critérium du Dauphiné, finishing in 24th place overall and taking second place in the mountains classification, behind David de la Cruz.

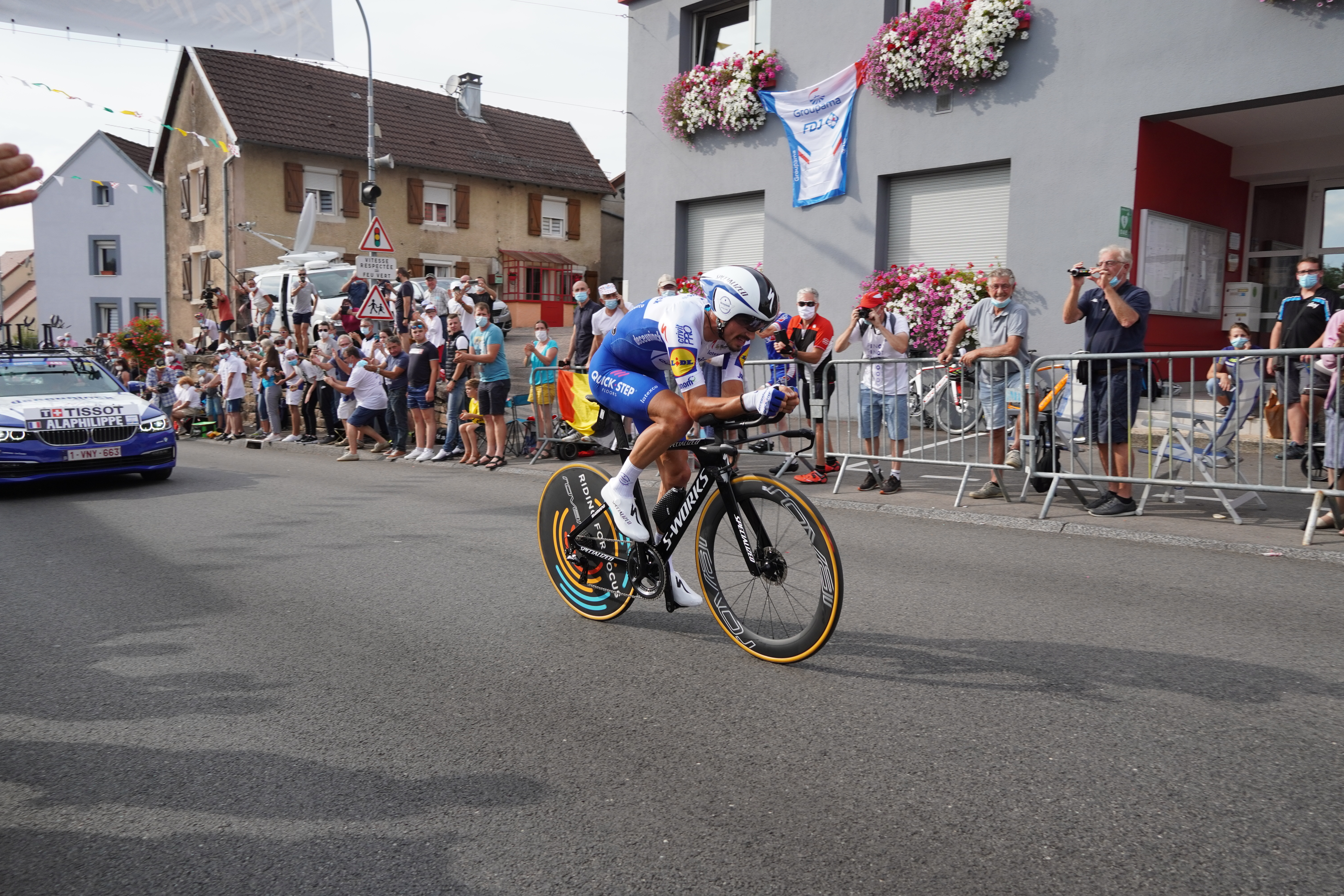
Alaphilippe during the stage 20 time trial at the Tour de France

At the postponed Tour de France, Alaphilippe won stage 2 in Nice with a powerful sprint from a three-man group that went clear over the final climb of the day, taking the overall lead at the same time. He held the yellow jersey until stage 5, when he received a 20-second time penalty for taking a bidon inside the final 20 kilometres (12 miles). On stage 17, to Méribel, Alaphilippe received the combativity award. He finished the Tour in 36th place overall.

At the UCI Road World Championships in Imola, Italy, Alaphilippe attacked on the final climb with just over 13 kilometres (8.1 miles) to go, to take the victory in the road race, a first for a French elite male since 1997. Alaphilippe's first race wearing the rainbow jersey was Liège–Bastogne–Liège, rescheduled to 4 October. He contested the five-man sprint and, believing he had won, celebrated as he crossed the line. However, a photo finish revealed that Primož Roglič had crossed the line in first place. Alaphilippe was later relegated to 5th place for impeding Marc Hirschi during the sprint. On 7 October, Alaphilippe took his first win as World Champion at Brabantse Pijl, ahead of Mathieu van der Poel and Benoît Cosnefroy, with whom he had attacked inside the final 20 kilometres (12 miles).

Alaphilippe's last race of the season was the Tour of Flanders. He was in the leading group of three riders which had made the decisive winning move, when he crashed into a race motorbike with 35 kilometres (22 miles) to go and abandoned the race after receiving roadside medical attention. His team later reported that he had broken two bones in his right hand.

==== 2021 ====
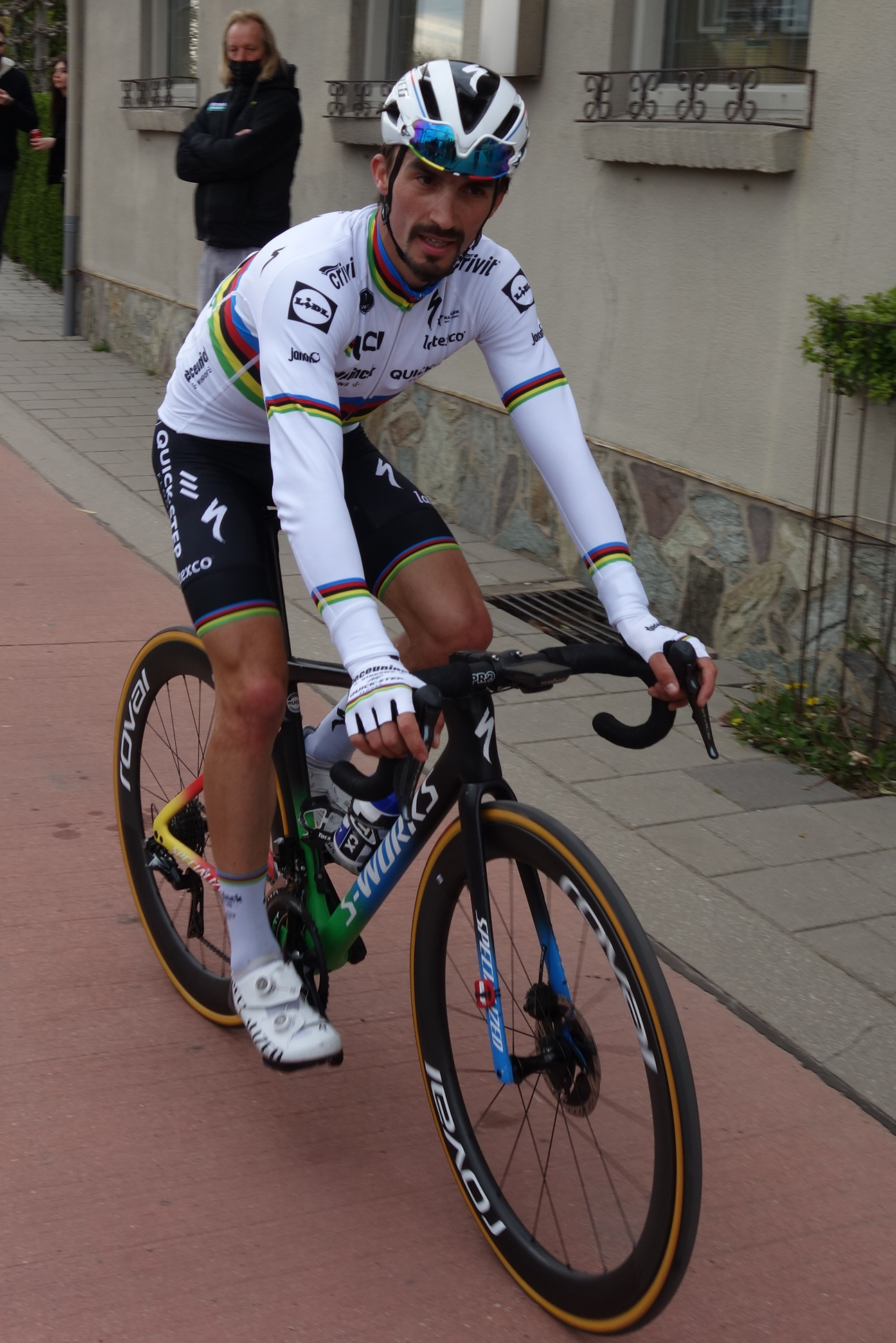
Alaphilippe at the 2021 Amstel Gold Race

Alaphilippe started his season by finishing second overall at the Tour de la Provence, before making his debut in Omloop Het Nieuwsblad. In March, he returned at the start of Strade Bianche, where he finished second. He remained in Italy for Tirreno–Adriatico, taking a stage win on the second stage, coming on the uphill finish of Chiusdino. Four days after concluding the race, he made an attack on the Poggio, forcing a selection in the closing kilometres of Milan–San Remo, but eventually finished 16th. After racing Dwars door Vlaanderen for the first time in his career and returning at the Tour of Flanders, where he attacked from distance several times and played a part in the victory of his teammate Kasper Asgreen, he announced the extension of his contract with Deceuninck–Quick-Step until the end of 2024.

Alaphilippe was then in the mix in Amstel Gold Race, finishing sixth for his fifth consecutive top 10 at the race. Three days later, he won La Flèche Wallonne for the third time, as he closed down an attack by Primož Roglič 50 metres (160 feet) before the finish; he became the first incumbent world champion since Cadel Evans in 2010 to win the race. He concluded his first part of the season with a second place in Liège–Bastogne–Liège. Alaphilippe was part of a five-man group who went clear on the final ascent of the day and managed to hold off the chasers, but was pipped on the line by Tadej Pogačar in the sprint for his second second-place finish at the race. He won the first stage of the Tour de France, attacking on the final climb of the stage, the Côte de la Fosse aux Loups. He lost the yellow jersey the following day, but assumed the green jersey of points classification leader for two further stages. He became the sixth rider to have worn the yellow, green, polka dot and white jerseys at the Tour de France during their career.

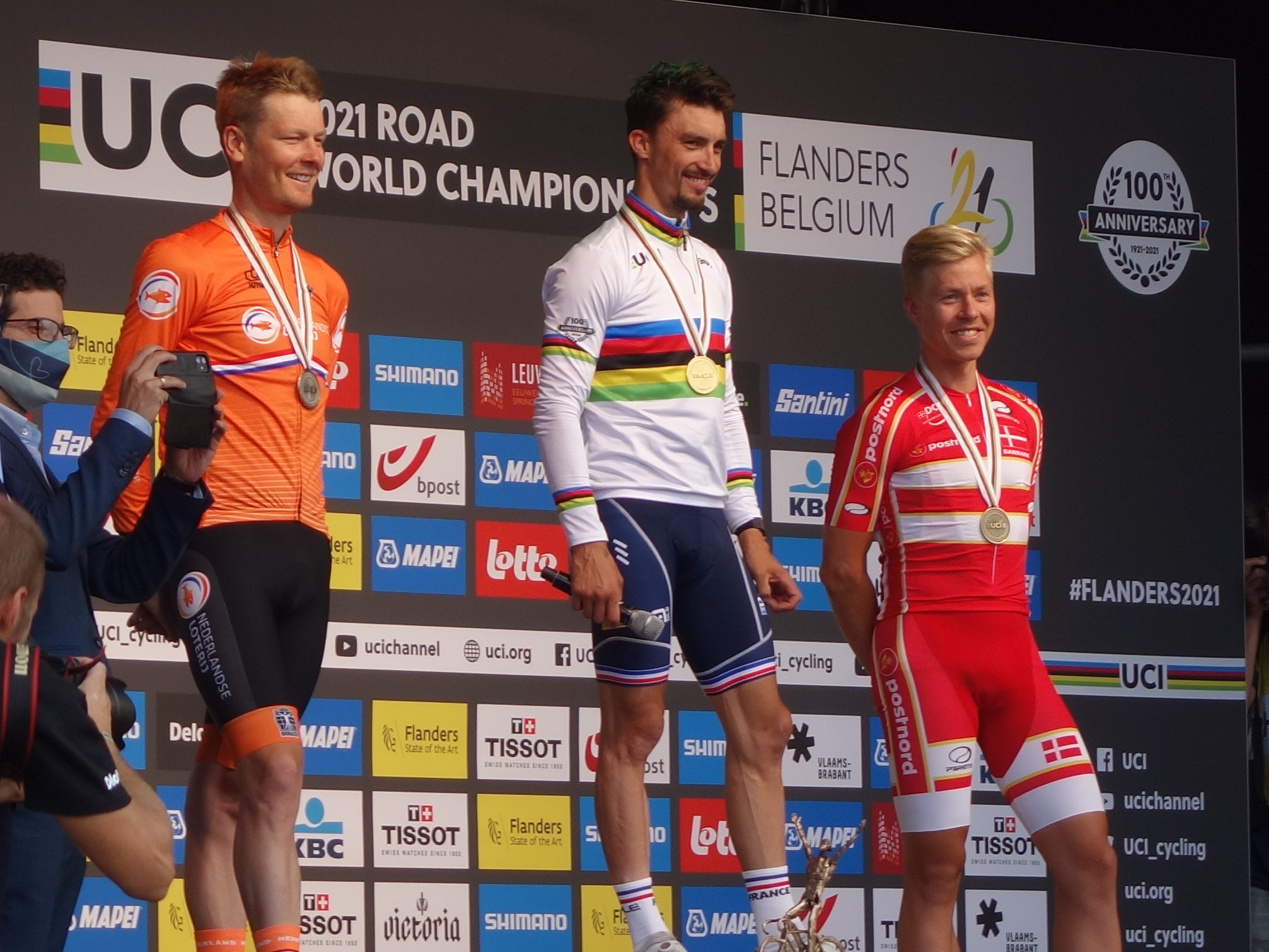
Alaphilippe (centre) on the podium after winning the road race at the 2021 UCI Road World Championships. He became the first French male rider to win multiple world road race titles.

Alaphilippe returned to the World Championships as an outside favourite to defend his title in the road race. The race was animated from the start, with Alaphilippe's French team on the attack early on. The French drew out the favoured host country Belgium, by beginning their assault 200 kilometres (120 miles) from the finish, as Belgium were attempting to control the proceedings for their team leader and favourite Wout van Aert. Alaphilippe made his first move with 58 kilometres (36 miles) to go, attacking on the Flandrien circuit, and bridging with the favourites up to the remaining breakaway riders. He attacked thrice more on the Leuven city circuit, further fracturing the dwindling group of favourites that included van Aert, Mathieu van der Poel and Sonny Colbrelli. Finally with 17 kilometres (11 miles) remaining, Alaphilippe made his fifth attack, on the Sint Antoniusberg climb, resulting in him moving clear of the leaders on the cobbled climb and soloed to victory. He became the first French male rider to win multiple world road race titles, and the first rider to win in successive years since Peter Sagan won in 2015, 2016, and 2017.

== Personal life ==
His father was musician Jo Alaphilippe, who died in June 2020 after a long illness (he attended the 2019 Tour de France in a wheelchair). His younger brother Bryan Alaphilippe also competed professionally as a cyclist, before retiring in March 2021. His cousin is trainer Franck Alaphilippe. In April 2020 Julian announced in an interview with L'Équipe that he was in a relationship with broadcaster and former racing cyclist Marion Rousse. In January 2021 Alaphilippe announced via social media that the couple were expecting a child. Their son Nino was born 14 June 2021.

== Career achievements ==
=== Major results ===
==== Road ====
2012
2nd Overall Coupe des nations Ville Saguenay

1st Young rider classification
1st Stage 2

2013
1st Grand Prix Südkärnten
Tour de l'Avenir

1st Points classification
1st Stage 7

1st Stage 3 Thüringen Rundfahrt der U23
4th Road race, UEC European Under-23 Championships
5th Overall Tour de Bretagne

1st Stage 4

8th Overall Course de la Paix U23
9th Road race, UCI World Under-23 Championships
10th Grand Prix Královéhradeckého kraje
2014 (1 pro win)
3rd RideLondon–Surrey Classic
4th Overall Tour de l'Ain

1st Points classification
1st Young rider classification
1st Stage 4

5th GP Ouest–France
2015 (1)
2nd Overall Tour of California

1st Young rider classification
1st Stage 7

2nd La Flèche Wallonne
2nd Liège–Bastogne–Liège
5th Road race, National Championships
7th Amstel Gold Race
8th Clásica de San Sebastián
10th Overall Eneco Tour
2016 (2)
1st Overall Tour of California

1st Stage 3

2nd Road race, UEC European Championships
2nd La Flèche Wallonne
4th Road race, Olympic Games
5th Road race, National Championships
6th Overall Critérium du Dauphiné

1st Young rider classification

6th Amstel Gold Race
8th Brabantse Pijl
10th Grand Prix Cycliste de Montréal
Tour de France

Held after Stages 2–6
Combativity award Stage 16

2017 (2)
1st Stage 8 Vuelta a España
2nd Giro di Lombardia
3rd Milan–San Remo
4th Overall Tour of Guangxi

1st Young rider classification

5th Overall Paris–Nice

1st Points classification
1st Young rider classification
1st Stage 4 (ITT)

5th Overall Abu Dhabi Tour

1st Young rider classification

10th Road race, UCI World Championships
2018 (12)
1st Overall Tour of Britain

1st Stage 3

1st Overall Okolo Slovenska

1st Stage 1

1st La Flèche Wallonne
1st Clásica de San Sebastián
Tour de France

1st Mountains classification
1st Stages 10 & 16

Tour of the Basque Country

1st Stages 1 & 2

1st Stage 4 Critérium du Dauphiné
3rd Road race, National Championships
4th Overall Abu Dhabi Tour
4th Liège–Bastogne–Liège
7th Overall Colombia Oro y Paz

1st Stage 4

7th Amstel Gold Race
8th UCI World Tour
8th Road race, UCI World Championships
2019 (12)
1st Milan–San Remo
1st Strade Bianche
1st La Flèche Wallonne
Critérium du Dauphiné

1st Mountains classification
1st Stage 6

1st Stage 2 Tour of the Basque Country
2nd Overall Vuelta a San Juan

1st Stages 2 & 3 (ITT)

2nd Brabantse Pijl
4th Amstel Gold Race
5th Overall Tour de France

1st Stages 3 & 13 (ITT)
Held after Stages 3–5 & 8–18
Combativity award Overall

6th Overall Tirreno–Adriatico

1st Stages 2 & 6

7th Overall Tour Colombia

1st Points classification
1st Stage 5

7th Grand Prix Cycliste de Québec
2020 (3)
1st Road race, UCI World Championships
1st Brabantse Pijl
Tour de France

1st Stage 2
Held after Stages 2–4
Combativity award Stage 17

2nd Milan–San Remo
3rd Road race, National Championships
5th Liège–Bastogne–Liège
2021 (4)
1st Road race, UCI World Championships
1st La Flèche Wallonne
Tour de France

1st Stage 1
Held after Stage 1
Held after Stages 1–3

1st Stage 2 Tirreno–Adriatico
2nd Overall Tour de la Provence
2nd Liège–Bastogne–Liège
2nd Strade Bianche
2nd Bretagne Classic
3rd Overall Tour of Britain
6th Giro di Lombardia
6th Amstel Gold Race
6th Clásica de San Sebastián
2022 (2)
1st Stage 2 Tour of the Basque Country
1st Stage 1 Tour de Wallonie
2nd Overall Tour de la Provence

1st Points classification

4th La Flèche Wallonne
5th La Drôme Classic
2023 (2)
1st Ardèche Classic
8th Coppa Bernocchi
9th Grand Prix Cycliste de Québec
9th Trofeo Calvia
10th Overall Critérium du Dauphiné

1st Stage 2

2024 (3)
Giro d'Italia

1st Stage 12
Combativity award Stages 6, 12, 16 & 19 and Overall

1st Stage 4 Czech Tour
2nd Overall Okolo Slovenska

1st Points classification
1st Stage 3

2nd Clásica de San Sebastián
3rd Grand Prix Cycliste de Montréal
6th Overall Tour Down Under
9th Milan–San Remo
2025 (1)
1st Grand Prix Cycliste de Québec
3rd Overall Tour of Britain
3rd Tre Valli Varesine
5th Overall Tour de Suisse
8th Figueira Champions Classic
2026
5th GP Gippingen

===== General classification results timeline =====
Grand Tour general classification results
Grand Tour	2014	2015	2016	2017	2018	2019	2020	2021	2022	2023	2024	2025	2026
Giro d'Italia	—	—	—	—	—	—	—	—	—	—	48	—	—
Tour de France	—	—	41	—	33	5	36	30	—	33	—	56	125
Vuelta a España	—	—	—	68	—	—	—	—	DNF	—	—	—	—
Major stage race general classification results timeline
Race	2014	2015	2016	2017	2018	2019	2020	2021	2022	2023	2024	2025	2026
Paris–Nice	—	43	—	5	18	—	16	—	—	—	—	44	—
Tirreno–Adriatico	—	—	—	—	—	6	—	41	33	30	62	—	33
Volta a Catalunya	83	DNF	DNF	—	—	—	NH	—	—	—	—	—	—
Tour of the Basque Country	—	—	—	DNF	35	DNF	NH	—	24	—	—	DNF	DNF
Tour de Romandie	—	DNF	—	—	—	—	NH	—	—	—	33	—	—
Critérium du Dauphiné	57	DNF	6	—	21	35	24	—	—	10	—	—	—
Tour de Suisse	—	—	—	—	—	—	NH	DNF	—	—	—	5	DNF

===== Classics results timeline =====
Monument	2014	2015	2016	2017	2018	2019	2020	2021	2022	2023	2024	2025	2026
Milan–San Remo	—	—	—	3	35	1	2	16	—	11	9	42	41
Tour of Flanders	—	—	—	—	—	—	DNF	42	—	51	70	—	—
Paris–Roubaix	Did not contest during his career												
Liège–Bastogne–Liège	—	2	23	—	4	16	5	2	DNF	86	—	58	—
Giro di Lombardia	DNF	—	60	2	—	—	—	6	51	36	—	23	—
Classic	2014	2015	2016	2017	2018	2019	2020	2021	2022	2023	2024	2025	2026
Omloop Het Nieuwsblad	—	—	—	—	—	—	—	57	—	—	DNF	—	—
Strade Bianche	—	—	—	—	—	1	24	2	58	43	DNF	—	20
Dwars door Vlaanderen	—	—	—	—	—	—	—	22	—	29	26	—	—
Brabantse Pijl	14	19	8	—	—	2	1	—	DNF	—	—	—	—
Amstel Gold Race	DNF	7	6	—	7	4	NH	6	—	—	—	20	DNF
La Flèche Wallonne	—	2	2	—	1	1	—	1	4	—	—	22	DNF
Clásica de San Sebastián	DNF	8	—	—	1	DNF	NH	6	—	DNF	2	—	—
Bretagne Classic	5	42	—	—	—	—	—	2	—	30	58	70	—
Grand Prix Cycliste de Québec	28	46	65	—	—	7	Not held		—	9	81	1	—
Grand Prix Cycliste de Montréal	57	60	10	—	—	13	Not held		—	12	3	DNF	—
Tre Valli Varesine	—	—	—	—	—	—	—	NH	—	82	NR	3	—

===== Major championships timeline =====
Event		2013	2014	2015	2016	2017	2018	2019	2020	2021	2022	2023	2024	2025
Olympic Games	Road race	Not held			4	Not held				—	Not held		11	NH
World Championships	Road race	—	—	DNF	—	10	8	28	1	1	51	DNF	DNF	DNF
European Championships	Road race	Race did not exist			2	—	—	—	—	—	—	—	—	—
National Championships	Road race	68	89	5	5	—	3	—	3	37	13	DNF	12	—

Legend
—	Did not compete
DNF	Did not finish
IP	Event in progress
NH	Event not held

==== Cyclo-cross ====
2009–2010
UCI Junior World Cup

1st Heusden-Zolder
3rd Hoogerheide

2nd UCI World Junior Championships
3rd National Junior Championships
2011–2012
1st National Under-23 Championships
3rd Overall UCI Under-23 World Cup

2nd Liévin
2nd Hoogerheide

Under-23 Coupe de France

1st Rodez

2012–2013
1st National Under-23 Championships
UCI Under-23 World Cup

1st Rome
3rd Hoogerheide

Under-23 Coupe de France

1st Besançon
2nd Saverne

3rd UEC European Under-23 Championships

=== Awards ===
- Vélo d'Or: 2019
- Vélo d'Or français: 2019, 2020, 2021
- International Flandrien of the Year: 2019

Awards and achievements
Preceded by Kevin Mayer	French Sportsman of the Year; 2019, 2020, 2021	Succeeded by Incumbent
