= 2019 Amstel Gold Race =

Cycling race

2019 UCI World Tour, race 18 of 38

Race details
- Dates: 21 April 2019
- Stages: 1
- Distance: 265.7 km (165.1 mi)
- Winning time: 6h 28' 18"

Results
	Winner	Mathieu van der Poel (NED)	(Corendon–Circus)
	Second	Simon Clarke (AUS)	(EF Education First)
	Third	Jakob Fuglsang (DEN)	(Astana)

The 2019 Amstel Gold Race is a road cycling one-day race that took place on 21 April 2019 in the Netherlands. It was the 54th edition of the Amstel Gold Race and the 18th event of the 2019 UCI World Tour.

== Teams ==
As the Amstel Gold Race was a UCI World Tour event, all eighteen UCI WorldTeams were invited automatically and obliged to enter a team in the race. Seven UCI Professional Continental teams competed, completing the 25-team peloton.

UCI WorldTeams

- AG2R La Mondiale
- Astana
- Bahrain–Merida
- Bora–Hansgrohe
- CCC Team
- Deceuninck–Quick-Step
- EF Education First
- Groupama–FDJ
- Lotto–Soudal
- Mitchelton–Scott
- Movistar Team
- Team Dimension Data
- Team Jumbo–Visma
- Team Katusha–Alpecin
- Team Sunweb
- Trek–Segafredo
- UAE Team Emirates
- Team Sky

UCI Professional Continental teams

- Bardiani–CSF
- Corendon–Circus
- Israel Cycling Academy
- Roompot–Charles
- Sport Vlaanderen–Baloise
- Vital Concept–B&B Hotels
- Wanty–Gobert

== Pre-race favourites ==
The main bookmakers' favourites before the race were Mathieu van der Poel, who was set to make his debut in the Amstel Gold Race, and Julian Alaphilippe. Both cyclists had already been successful in the early season, with Van der Poel winning Dwars door Vlaanderen and the Brabantse Pijl and Alaphilippe taking the victory in Strade Bianche and Milan–San Remo. Other riders seen as contenders included Michael Matthews, Peter Sagan, Maximilian Schachmann, Alejandro Valverde and Jakob Fuglsang, as well as former winners Philippe Gilbert and Michał Kwiatkowski. Defending champion Michael Valgren also participated, but was not seen as a favourite due to his disappointing start of the season.

== Race summary ==
Early in the race, a breakaway group of 11 riders escaped the peloton. Their lead would grow to eight minutes before Jakob Fuglsang's Astana team increased the pace in the peloton. Mathieu van der Poel was the first of the favourites to attack at 43 km to the finish together with Gorka Izagirre, but their attempt was brought back by the peloton soon after. Julian Alaphilippe was the next to attack after the early breakaway was caught, joined by Fuglsang and Matteo Trentin. Trentin was unable to follow the other two and would be joined by Michał Kwiatkowski, with a chase group containing most of the favourites following shortly behind them.

After the final ascent of the Cauberg, Alaphilippe and Fuglsang had a lead of 30 seconds over the two chasers and nearly a minute over the group behind. With 3 km to go their lead was up to 40 seconds over Kwiatkowski, who had left Trentin behind. At that point, the two in front stopped collaborating with each other, attempting to conserve energy for their final sprint. However, they were then caught in the last kilometer, first by Kwiatkowski and then by the other chase group led by Van der Poel. In the ensuing sprint, Van der Poel proved to be the strongest, while the other podium places were taken by Simon Clarke and Fuglsang.

== Result ==
Result
Rank	Rider	Team	Time
1	Mathieu van der Poel (NED)	Corendon–Circus	6h 28' 18"
2	Simon Clarke (AUS)	EF Education First	s.t.
3	Jakob Fuglsang (DEN)	Astana	s.t.
4	Julian Alaphilippe (FRA)	Deceuninck–Quick-Step	s.t.
5	Maximilian Schachmann (GER)	Bora–Hansgrohe	s.t.
6	Bjorg Lambrecht (BEL)	Lotto–Soudal	s.t.
7	Alessandro De Marchi (ITA)	CCC Team	s.t.
8	Valentin Madouas (FRA)	Groupama–FDJ	s.t.
9	Romain Bardet (FRA)	AG2R La Mondiale	s.t.
10	Matteo Trentin (ITA)	Mitchelton–Scott	s.t.
