= 2018 Clásica de San Sebastián =

2018 UCI World Tour, race 27 of 38

Race details
- Dates: 4 August 2018
- Stages: 1
- Distance: 228.7 km (142.1 mi)
- Winning time: 6h 03' 45"

Results
| | Winner | Julian Alaphilippe (FRA) | (Quick-Step Floors) |
| | Second | Bauke Mollema (NED) | (Trek–Segafredo) |
| | Third | Anthony Roux (FRA) | (Groupama–FDJ) |

The 2018 Clásica de San Sebastián was a road cycling one-day race that took place on 4 August in San Sebastián, Spain. It was the 38th edition of the Clásica de San Sebastián and the twenty-seventh event of the 2018 UCI World Tour. It was won by Julian Alaphilippe in the sprint ahead of Bauke Mollema.

== Teams ==
22 teams of seven riders have been invited to take part in the race: 18 teams of the UCI WorldTeam category; and four of the Continental Professional category. Forming a peloton of 154 cyclists, the participating teams are:

UCI WorldTeams

- Team Sky
- AG2R La Mondiale
- Astana
- Bahrain–Merida
- BMC Racing Team
- Bora–Hansgrohe
- Lotto–Soudal
- Mitchelton–BikeExchange
- Movistar Team
- Quick-Step Floors
- Team Dimension Data
- EF Education First–Drapac p/b Cannondale
- Team Katusha–Alpecin
- LottoNL–Jumbo
- Team Sunweb
- Trek–Segafredo
- UAE Team Emirates
- Groupama–FDJ

UCI Professional Continental teams

- Burgos BH
- Caja Rural–Seguros RGA
- Cofidis
- Euskadi–Murias

== Result ==
Result
| Rank | Rider | Team | Time |
|---|---|---|---|
| 1 | Julian Alaphilippe (FRA) | Quick-Step Floors | 6h 03' 45" |
| 2 | Bauke Mollema (NED) | Trek–Segafredo | + 0" |
| 3 | Anthony Roux (FRA) | Groupama–FDJ | + 16" |
| 4 | Greg Van Avermaet (BEL) | BMC Racing Team | + 16" |
| 5 | Julien Simon (FRA) | Cofidis | + 16" |
| 6 | Rigoberto Urán (COL) | EF Education First–Drapac p/b Cannondale | + 16" |
| 7 | Ion Izagirre (ESP) | Bahrain–Merida | + 16" |
| 8 | Robert Gesink (NED) | LottoNL–Jumbo | + 16" |
| 9 | Steven Kruijswijk (NED) | LottoNL–Jumbo | + 16" |
| 10 | Antwan Tolhoek (NED) | LottoNL–Jumbo | + 16" |
