= 2020 Brabantse Pijl =

2020 UCI Europe Tour 2020 UCI ProSeries
- Event poster with previous winner Mathieu van der Poel

Race details
- Dates: 7 October 2020
- Stages: 1
- Distance: 197.2 km (122.5 mi)
- Winning time: 4h 36' 52"

Results
	Winner	Julian Alaphilippe (FRA)	(Deceuninck–Quick-Step)
	Second	Mathieu van der Poel (NED)	(Alpecin–Fenix)
	Third	Benoît Cosnefroy (FRA)	(AG2R La Mondiale)

The 2020 Brabantse Pijl was the 60th edition of the Brabantse Pijl cycle race and was held on 7 October 2020. The race covered 197.2 km (122.5 mi), starting in Leuven and finishing in Overijse. Originally, the race was to be held on 15 April 2020, but it was postponed due to the COVID-19 pandemic.

With around 11 kilometers to go, on the final ascent of the Moskesstraat, a decisive selection of three riders broke and managed to stay away to contest for the win. Last year's runner-up Julian Alaphilippe of Deceuninck–Quick-Step managed to hold off last year's winner Mathieu van der Poel of Alpecin–Fenix for the win. In doing so, Alaphilippe won his first race as world champion after a premature celebration and relegation at the 2020 Liège–Bastogne–Liège a few days prior cost him the win there. Benoît Cosnefroy of AG2R La Mondiale finished third to complete the podium.

== Teams ==
Fifteen UCI WorldTeams and ten UCI ProTeams made up the twenty-five teams that participated in the race. All but two teams entered seven riders; Cofidis entered six, while Astana entered five. 114 of the 172 riders in the race finished.

UCI WorldTeams

- AG2R La Mondiale
- Astana
- Bahrain–McLaren
- Bora–Hansgrohe
- CCC Team
- Cofidis
- Deceuninck–Quick-Step
- Israel Start-Up Nation
- Lotto–Soudal
- Mitchelton–Scott
- INEOS Grenadiers
- NTT Pro Cycling
- Team Sunweb
- Trek–Segafredo
- UAE Team Emirates

UCI Professional Continental teams

- Alpecin–Fenix
- Arkéa–Samsic
- B&B Hotels–Vital Concept
- Bingoal–Wallonie Bruxelles
- Circus–Wanty Gobert
- Gazprom–RusVelo
- Riwal Securitas
- Sport Vlaanderen–Baloise
- Team Novo Nordisk
- Total Direct Énergie

== Result ==
Result
Rank	Rider	Team	Time
1	Julian Alaphilippe (FRA)	Deceuninck–Quick-Step	4h 36' 52"
2	Mathieu van der Poel (NED)	Alpecin–Fenix	+ 0"
3	Benoît Cosnefroy (FRA)	AG2R La Mondiale	+ 0"
4	Sonny Colbrelli (ITA)	Bahrain–McLaren	+ 13"
5	Warren Barguil (FRA)	Arkéa–Samsic	+ 13"
6	Michał Kwiatkowski (POL)	INEOS Grenadiers	+ 13"
7	Andrea Bagioli (ITA)	Deceuninck–Quick-Step	+ 13"
8	Anthony Turgis (FRA)	Total Direct Énergie	+ 13"
9	Alessandro Covi (ITA)	UAE Team Emirates	+ 13"
10	Dries Devenyns (BEL)	Deceuninck–Quick-Step	+ 13"
