= 2018 La Flèche Wallonne =

Cycling race

2018 UCI World Tour, race 17 of 37
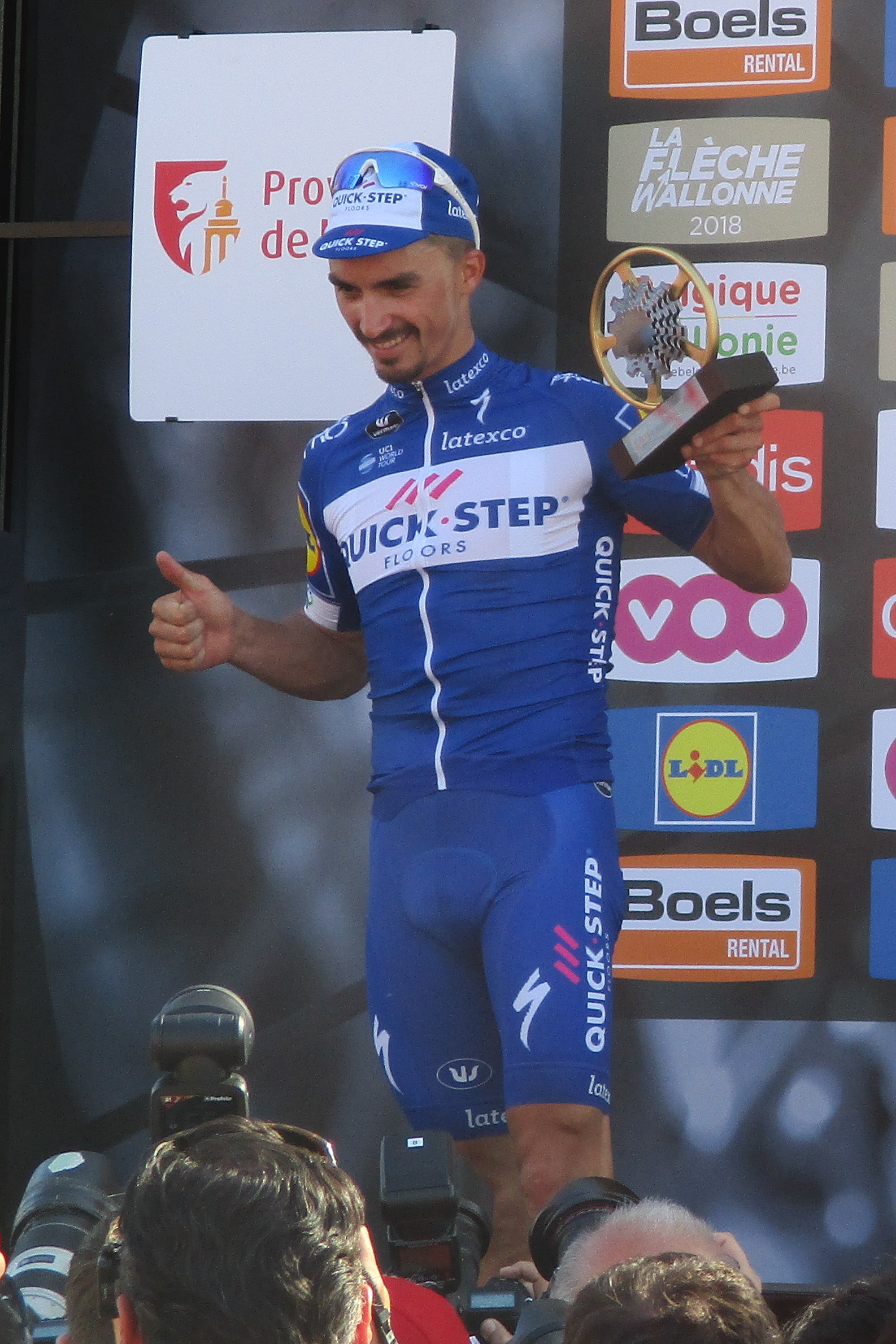
- Julian Alaphilippe, the race winner

Race details
- Dates: 18 April 2018
- Stages: 1
- Distance: 198.5 km (123.3 mi)
- Winning time: 4h 53' 37"

Results
	Winner	Julian Alaphilippe (FRA)	(Quick-Step Floors)
	Second	Alejandro Valverde (ESP)	(Movistar Team)
	Third	Jelle Vanendert (BEL)	(Lotto–Soudal)

The 2018 La Flèche Wallonne was a road cycling one-day race that took place on 18 April 2018 in Belgium. It was the 82nd edition of the La Flèche Wallonne and the seventeenth event of the 2018 UCI World Tour.

During the third and final ascent of the Mur de Huy, Quick-Step Floors rider Julian Alaphilippe accelerated near the summit, overtaking race leader Jelle Vanendert (Lotto–Soudal) in the last 100 metres of the race and dropping him. Alejandro Valverde, who had won the last four editions for the Movistar Team, staged a late fight-back and almost caught Alaphilippe, but Alaphilippe was able to kick again in the final metres to increase his lead, to win by four seconds from Valverde. It was the biggest victory of Alaphilippe's career at that point, becoming the first French winner of the race since Laurent Jalabert in 1997.

== Teams ==
As La Flèche Wallonne was a UCI World Tour event, all eighteen UCI WorldTeams were invited automatically and obliged to enter a team in the race. Seven UCI Professional Continental teams competed as wildcards, completing the 25-team peloton.

UCI WorldTeams

- AG2R La Mondiale
- Astana
- Bahrain–Merida
- BMC Racing Team
- Bora–Hansgrohe
- Team Dimension Data
- EF Education First–Drapac p/b Cannondale
- Team Katusha–Alpecin
- LottoNL–Jumbo
- Lotto–Soudal
- Mitchelton–Scott
- Movistar Team
- Quick-Step Floors
- Team Sky
- Team Sunweb
- Trek–Segafredo
- UAE Team Emirates
- Groupama–FDJ

UCI Professional Continental teams

- Cofidis
- Delko–Marseille Provence KTM
- Fortuneo–Samsic
- Sport Vlaanderen–Baloise
- Vital Concept
- Wanty–Groupe Gobert
- WB Aqua Protect Veranclassic

== Result ==
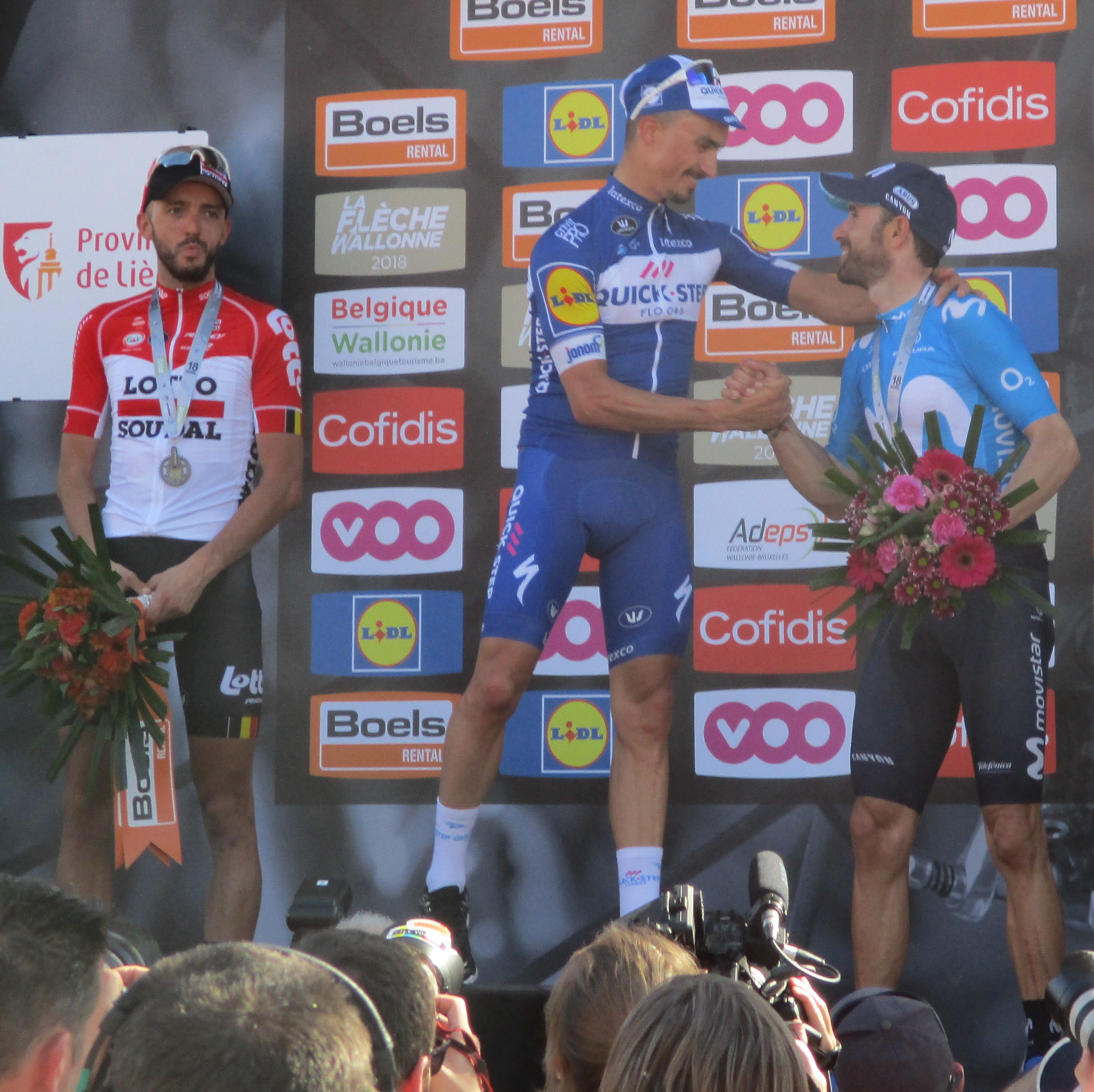
The final podium (from left to right): Jelle Vanendert, Julian Alaphilippe and Alejandro Valverde.

Result
Rank	Rider	Team	Time
1	Julian Alaphilippe (FRA)	Quick-Step Floors	4h 53' 37"
2	Alejandro Valverde (ESP)	Movistar Team	+ 4"
3	Jelle Vanendert (BEL)	Lotto–Soudal	+ 6"
4	Roman Kreuziger (CZE)	Mitchelton–Scott	+ 6"
5	Michael Matthews (AUS)	Team Sunweb	+ 6"
6	Bauke Mollema (NED)	Trek–Segafredo	+ 6"
7	Tim Wellens (BEL)	Lotto–Soudal	+ 6"
8	Maximilian Schachmann (GER)	Quick-Step Floors	+ 6"
9	Romain Bardet (FRA)	AG2R La Mondiale	+ 6"
10	Patrick Konrad (AUT)	Bora–Hansgrohe	+ 12"
