= 2019 Brabantse Pijl =

- Event poster with previous winner Tim Wellens

Race details
- Dates: 17 April 2019
- Stages: 1
- Distance: 196.2 km (121.9 mi)
- Winning time: 4h 35' 11"

Results
	Winner	Mathieu van der Poel (NED)	(Corendon–Circus)
	Second	Julian Alaphilippe (FRA)	(Deceuninck–Quick-Step)
	Third	Tim Wellens (BEL)	(Lotto–Soudal)

The 2019 Brabantse Pijl was the 59th edition of the Brabantse Pijl cycle race and was held on 17 April 2019. The race started in Leuven and finished in Overijse. The race was won by Mathieu van der Poel of Corendon–Circus.

== Teams ==
21 teams participated in the race, including 8 UCI WorldTeams and 13 UCI Professional Continental teams. Each team had a maximum of seven riders:

UCI WorldTeams

- Lotto–Soudal
- Deceuninck–Quick-Step
- Team Sunweb
- Bahrain–Merida
- Team Dimension Data
- EF Education First
- Mitchelton–Scott
- UAE Team Emirates

UCI Professional Continental teams

- Arkéa–Samsic
- Cofidis
- Corendon–Circus
- Israel Cycling Academy
- Neri Sottoli–Selle Italia–KTM
- Riwal Readynez
- Roompot–Charles
- Sport Vlaanderen–Baloise
- Team Novo Nordisk
- Vital Concept–B&B Hotels
- Wallonie Bruxelles
- Wanty–Gobert
- Total Direct Énergie

== Result ==
Result
Rank	Rider	Team	Time
1	Mathieu van der Poel (NED)	Corendon–Circus	4h 35' 11"
2	Julian Alaphilippe (FRA)	Deceuninck–Quick-Step	+ 0"
3	Tim Wellens (BEL)	Lotto–Soudal	+ 0"
4	Michael Matthews (AUS)	Team Sunweb	+ 0"
5	Bjorg Lambrecht (BEL)	Lotto–Soudal	+ 11"
6	Alberto Bettiol (ITA)	EF Education First	+ 12"
7	Enrico Gasparotto (ITA)	Team Dimension Data	+ 12"
8	Alexander Kamp (DEN)	Riwal Readynez	+ 12"
9	Pieter Serry (BEL)	Deceuninck–Quick-Step	+ 12"
10	Maurits Lammertink (NED)	Roompot–Charles	+ 12"
