= 2021 La Flèche Wallonne =

Cycling race

2021 UCI World Tour, race 15 of 29

Race details
- Dates: 21 April 2021
- Stages: 1
- Distance: 192 km (119.3 mi)
- Winning time: 4h 36' 25"

Results
	Winner	Julian Alaphilippe (FRA)	(Deceuninck–Quick-Step)
	Second	Primož Roglič (SLO)	(Team Jumbo–Visma)
	Third	Alejandro Valverde (ESP)	(Movistar Team)

The 2021 La Flèche Wallonne is a road cycling one-day race that took place on 21 April 2021 from the Belgian city of Charleroi to the municipality of Huy. It was the 85th edition of La Flèche Wallonne and the 15th event of the 2021 UCI World Tour. It was won for the third time by Julian Alaphilippe.

== Teams ==
Twenty-five teams were invited to the race, including all nineteen UCI WorldTeams and six UCI ProTeams. However, UAE Team Emirates had to withdraw from the race at the last moment because of two COVID-19 positives in the team.

UCI WorldTeams

- AG2R Citroën Team
- Astana–Premier Tech
- Bora–Hansgrohe
- Cofidis
- Deceuninck–Quick-Step
- EF Education–Nippo
- Groupama–FDJ
- Ineos Grenadiers
- Intermarché–Wanty–Gobert Matériaux
- Israel Start-Up Nation
- Lotto–Soudal
- Movistar Team
- Team Bahrain Victorious
- Team BikeExchange
- Team DSM
- Team Jumbo–Visma
- Team Qhubeka Assos
- Trek–Segafredo
- ~~UAE Team Emirates~~

UCI ProTeams

- Alpecin–Fenix
- Arkéa–Samsic
- Bingoal Pauwels Sauces WB
- Delko
- Gazprom–RusVelo
- Sport Vlaanderen–Baloise

== Result ==
Result
Rank	Rider	Team	Time
1	Julian Alaphilippe (FRA)	Deceuninck–Quick-Step	4h 36' 25"
2	Primož Roglič (SLO)	Team Jumbo–Visma	+ 0"
3	Alejandro Valverde (ESP)	Movistar Team	+ 6"
4	Michael Woods (CAN)	Israel Start-Up Nation	+ 8"
5	Warren Barguil (FRA)	Arkéa–Samsic	+ 11"
6	Tom Pidcock (GBR)	Ineos Grenadiers	+ 11"
7	David Gaudu (FRA)	Groupama–FDJ	+ 11"
8	Esteban Chaves (COL)	Team BikeExchange	+ 11"
9	Richard Carapaz (ECU)	Ineos Grenadiers	+ 11"
10	Maximilian Schachmann (GER)	Bora–Hansgrohe	+ 16"
