= 2022 Tour of Flanders =

2022 Tour of Flanders may refer to:

- 2022 Tour of Flanders (men's race)
- 2022 Tour of Flanders (women's race)
