= 2019 La Flèche Wallonne =

Cycling race

2019 UCI World Tour, race 19 of 38
- Event poster

Race details
- Dates: 24 April 2019
- Stages: 1
- Distance: 195.5 km (121.5 mi)
- Winning time: 4h 55' 14"

Results
	Winner	Julian Alaphilippe (FRA)	(Deceuninck–Quick-Step)
	Second	Jakob Fuglsang (DEN)	(Astana)
	Third	Diego Ulissi (ITA)	(UAE Team Emirates)

The 2019 La Flèche Wallonne is a road cycling one-day race that took place on 24 April 2019 in Belgium. It was the 83rd edition of La Flèche Wallonne and the 19th event of the 2019 UCI World Tour. It was won for the second consecutive time by Julian Alaphilippe.

== Teams ==
As La Flèche Wallonne was a UCI World Tour event, all eighteen UCI WorldTeams were invited automatically and obliged to enter a team in the race. Seven UCI Professional Continental teams competed, completing the 25-team peloton.

UCI WorldTeams

- AG2R La Mondiale
- Astana
- Bahrain–Merida
- Bora–Hansgrohe
- CCC Team
- Deceuninck–Quick-Step
- EF Education First
- Groupama–FDJ
- Lotto–Soudal
- Mitchelton–Scott
- Movistar Team
- Team Dimension Data
- Team Jumbo–Visma
- Team Katusha–Alpecin
- Team Sunweb
- Trek–Segafredo
- UAE Team Emirates
- Team Sky

UCI Professional Continental teams

- Cofidis
- Euskadi–Murias
- Israel Cycling Academy
- Rally UHC Cycling
- Sport Vlaanderen–Baloise
- Wallonie Bruxelles
- Wanty–Gobert

== Result ==
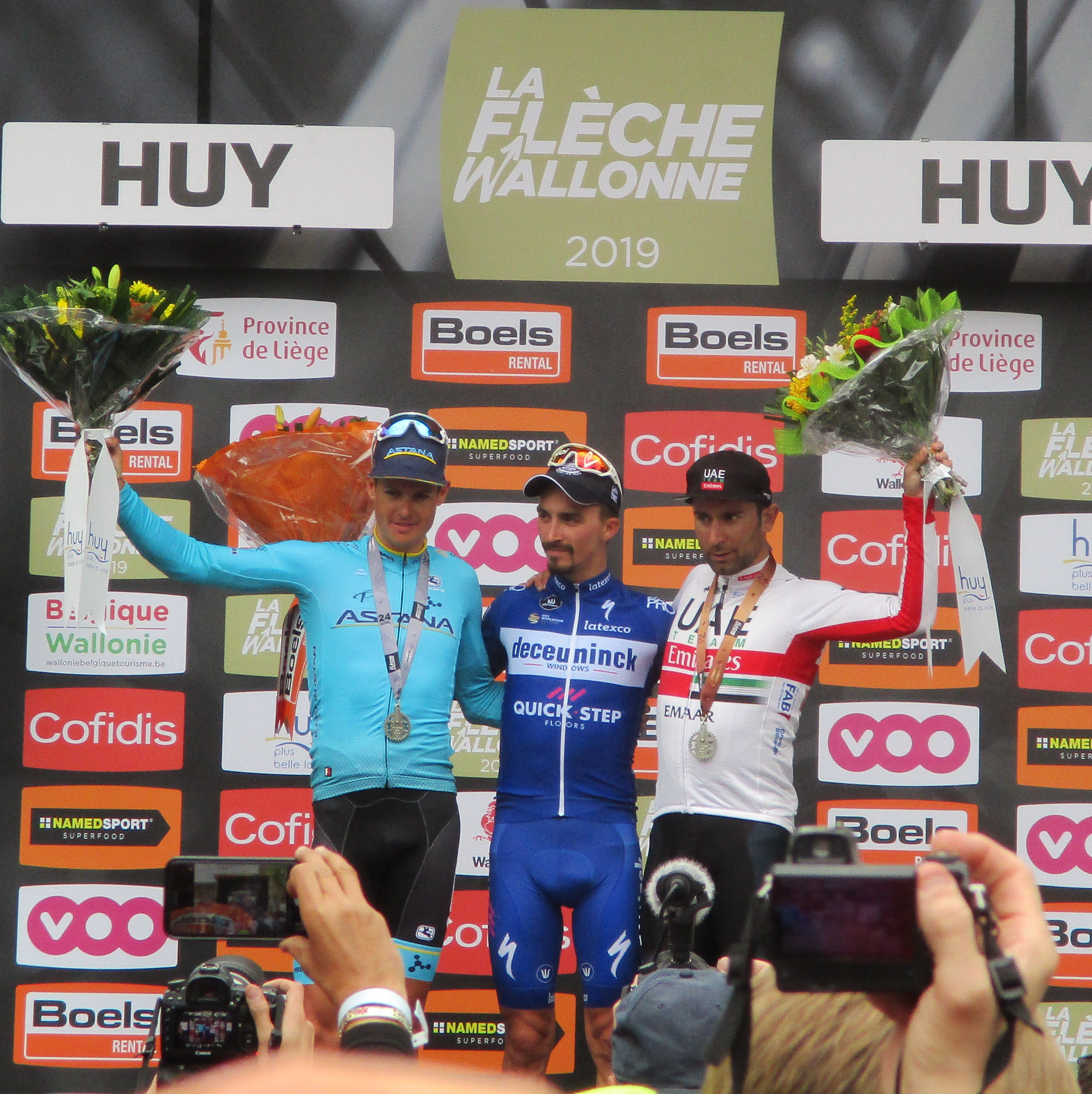
2019 Flèche Wallonne podium: Jakob Fuglsang, Julian Alaphilippe and Diego Ulissi

Result
Rank	Rider	Team	Time
1	Julian Alaphilippe (FRA)	Deceuninck–Quick-Step	4h 55' 14"
2	Jakob Fuglsang (DEN)	Astana	+ 0"
3	Diego Ulissi (ITA)	UAE Team Emirates	+ 6"
4	Bjorg Lambrecht (BEL)	Lotto–Soudal	+ 8"
5	Maximilian Schachmann (GER)	Bora–Hansgrohe	+ 8"
6	Bauke Mollema (NED)	Trek–Segafredo	+ 8"
7	Patrick Konrad (AUT)	Bora–Hansgrohe	+ 8"
8	Michael Matthews (AUS)	Team Sunweb	+ 8"
9	Jelle Vanendert (BEL)	Lotto–Soudal	+ 11"
10	Enrico Gasparotto (ITA)	Team Dimension Data	+ 11"
