= 2022 Strade Bianche =

2022 UCI World Tour, race 3 of 32
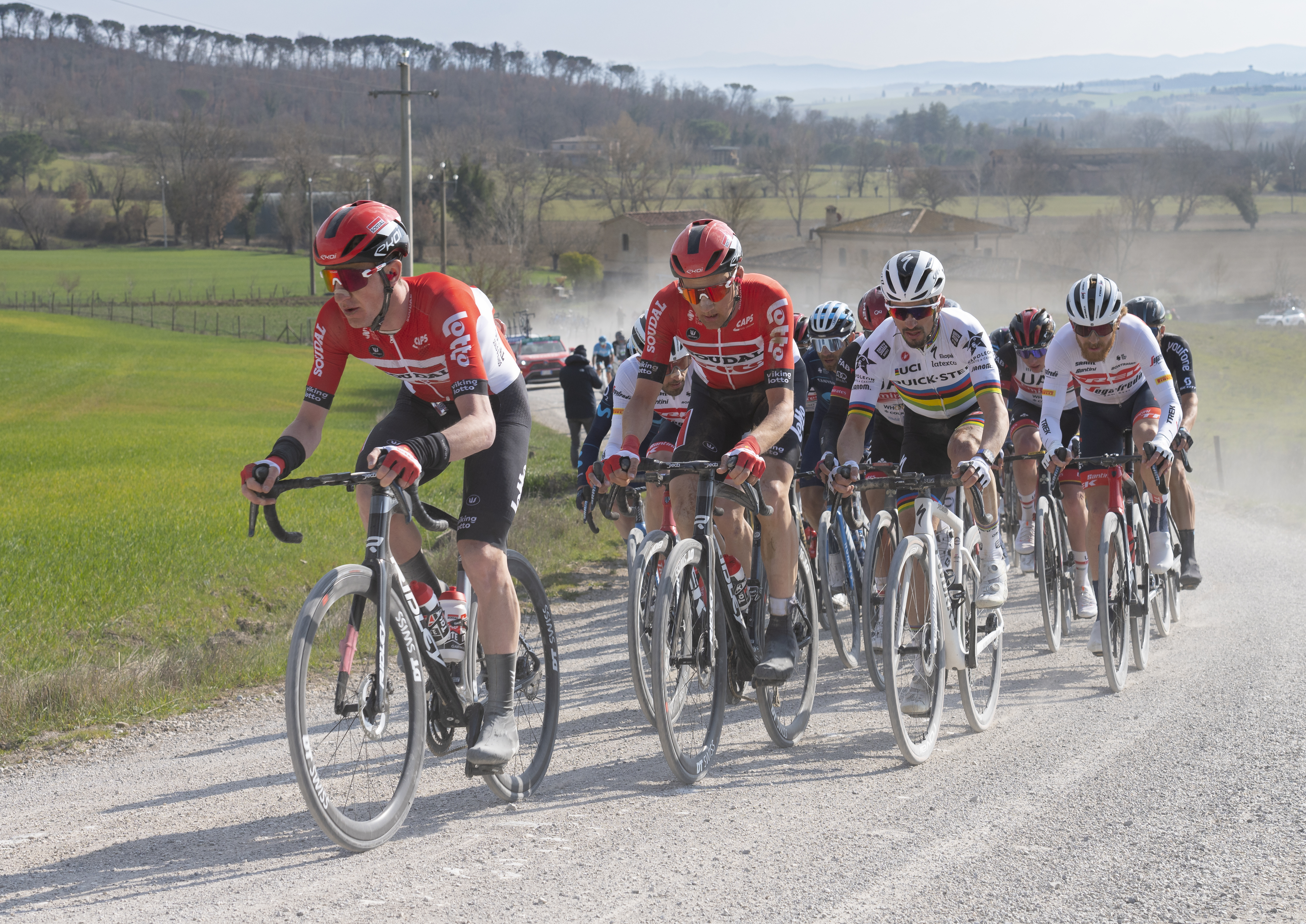

Race details
- Dates: 5 March 2022
- Stages: 1
- Distance: 184 km (114 mi)
- Winning time: 4h 47' 49"

Results
	Winner	Tadej Pogačar (SLO)	(UAE Team Emirates)
	Second	Alejandro Valverde (ESP)	(Movistar Team)
	Third	Kasper Asgreen (DEN)	(Quick-Step Alpha Vinyl Team)

The 16th edition of Strade Bianche was held on 5 March 2022. It was the third event of the 2022 UCI World Tour.

== Teams ==
Twenty-two teams participated in the race, seventeen UCI WorldTeams and five UCI ProTeams.

UCI WorldTeams

- AG2R Citroën Team
- Astana Qazaqstan Team
- Bora–Hansgrohe
- EF Education–EasyPost
- Groupama–FDJ
- INEOS Grenadiers
- Intermarché–Wanty–Gobert Matériaux
- Israel–Premier Tech
- Lotto–Soudal
- Movistar Team
- Quick-Step Alpha Vinyl Team
- Team Bahrain Victorious
- Team BikeExchange–Jayco
- Team DSM
- Team Jumbo–Visma
- Trek–Segafredo
- UAE Team Emirates

UCI ProTeams

- Alpecin–Fenix
- Arkéa–Samsic
- Bardiani–CSF–Faizanè
- Drone Hopper–Androni Giocattoli
- Eolo–Kometa

== Route ==
Starting and finishing in Siena the course covers 184 kilometres (114 mi). It includes 63 kilometres (39 mi) of gravel over eleven sectors.

== Result ==
Result (1–10)
Rank	Rider	Team	Time
1	Tadej Pogačar (SLO)	UAE Team Emirates	4h 47' 49"
2	Alejandro Valverde (ESP)	Movistar Team	+ 37"
3	Kasper Asgreen (DEN)	Quick-Step Alpha Vinyl Team	+ 46"
4	Attila Valter (HUN)	Groupama–FDJ	+ 1' 07"
5	Pello Bilbao (ESP)	Team Bahrain Victorious	+ 1' 09"
6	Jhonatan Narváez (ECU)	INEOS Grenadiers	+ 1' 09"
7	Quinn Simmons (USA)	Trek–Segafredo	+ 1' 21"
8	Tim Wellens (BEL)	Lotto–Soudal	+ 1' 25"
9	Simone Petilli (ITA)	Intermarché–Wanty–Gobert Matériaux	+ 1' 35"
10	Sergio Higuita (COL)	Bora–Hansgrohe	+ 1' 53"
