= 2019 Milan–San Remo =

Cycling race

2019 UCI World Tour, race 8 of 38
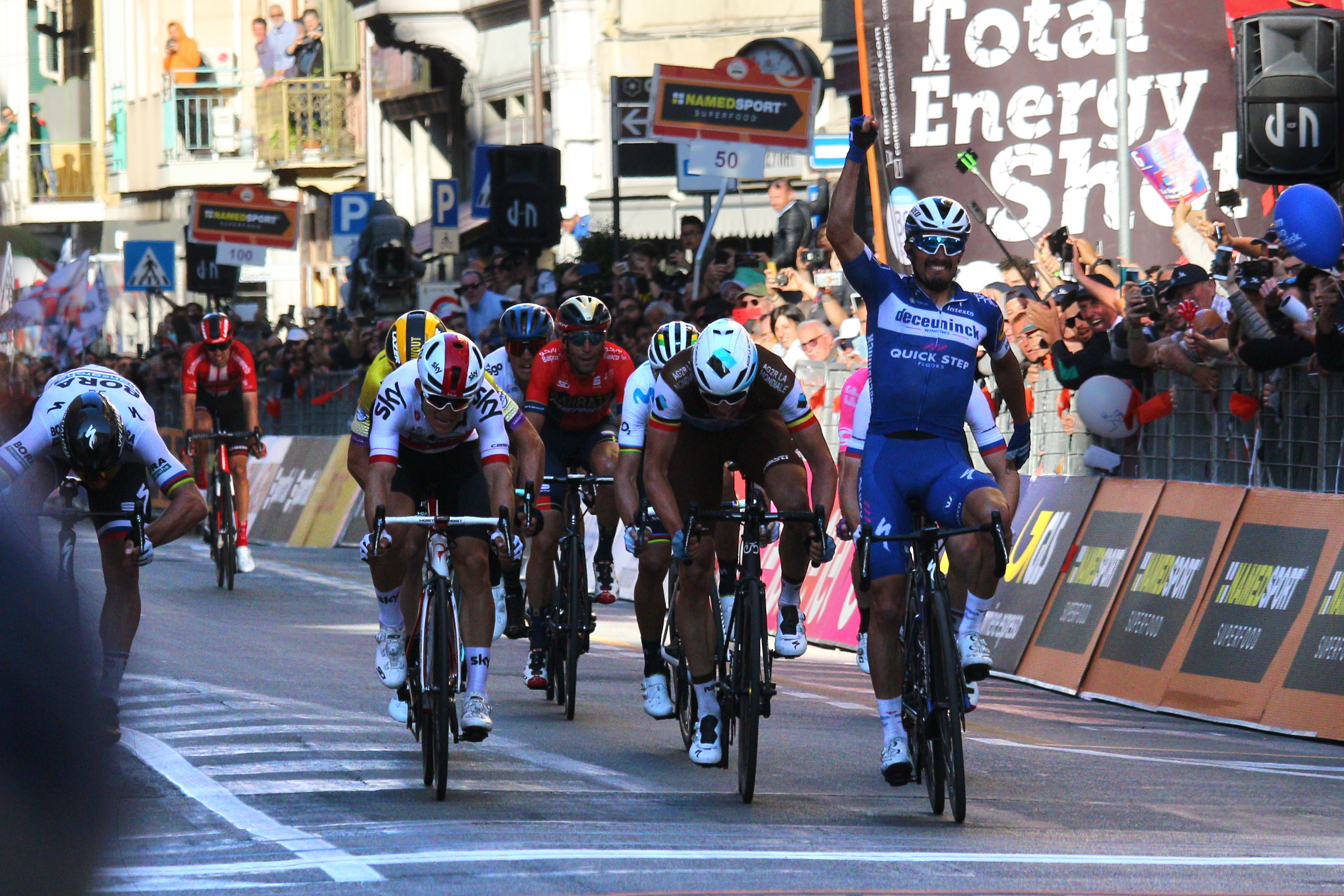
- Via Roma

Race details
- Dates: 23 March 2019
- Stages: 1
- Distance: 291 km (181 mi)
- Winning time: 6h 40' 14"

Results
	Winner	Julian Alaphilippe (FRA)	(Deceuninck–Quick-Step)
	Second	Oliver Naesen (BEL)	(AG2R La Mondiale)
	Third	Michał Kwiatkowski (POL)	(Team Sky)

The 2019 Milan–San Remo was the 110th edition of the Milan–San Remo one-day Italian road cycling race that took place on 23 March 2019. It was the eighth event of the 2019 UCI World Tour, and was the first Monument of the year. The race was won in the sprint by Julian Alaphilippe before Oliver Naesen and the winner of the 2017 race Michał Kwiatkowski.

== Result ==
Result
Rank	Rider	Team	Time
1	Julian Alaphilippe (FRA)	Deceuninck–Quick-Step	6h 40' 14"
2	Oliver Naesen (BEL)	AG2R La Mondiale	+ 0"
3	Michał Kwiatkowski (POL)	Team Sky	+ 0"
4	Peter Sagan (SVK)	Bora–Hansgrohe	+ 0"
5	Matej Mohorič (SLO)	Bahrain–Merida	+ 0"
6	Wout Van Aert (BEL)	Team Jumbo–Visma	+ 0"
7	Alejandro Valverde (ESP)	Movistar Team	+ 0"
8	Vincenzo Nibali (ITA)	Bahrain–Merida	+ 0"
9	Simon Clarke (AUS)	EF Education First	+ 0"
10	Matteo Trentin (ITA)	Mitchelton–Scott	+ 0"
