= 2019 Strade Bianche =

2019 UCI World Tour, race 5 of 38
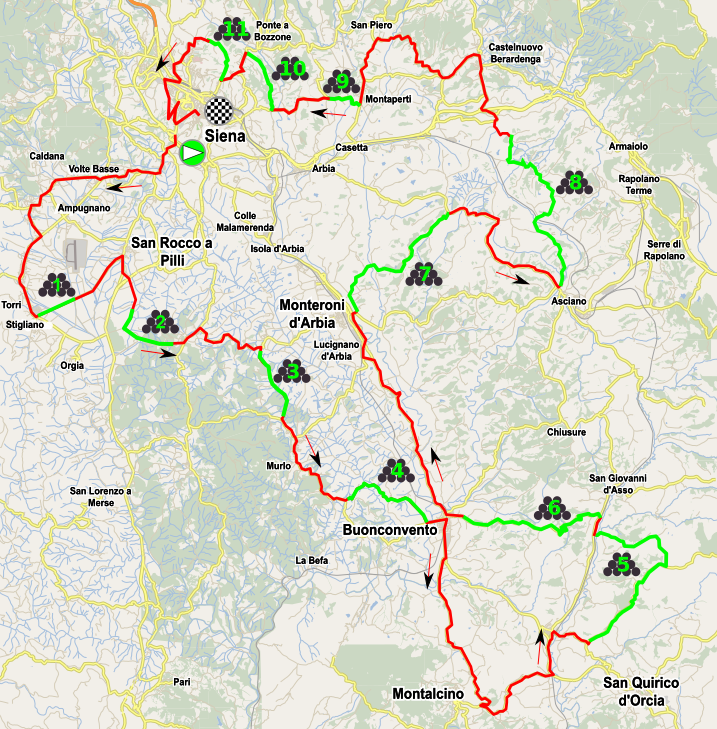

Race details
- Dates: 9 March 2019
- Stages: 1
- Distance: 184 km (114.3 mi)
- Winning time: 4h 47' 14"

Results
	Winner	Julian Alaphilippe (FRA)	(Deceuninck–Quick-Step)
	Second	Jakob Fuglsang (DEN)	(Astana)
	Third	Wout van Aert (BEL)	(Team Jumbo–Visma)

The 13th edition of the Strade Bianche was held on 9 March 2019. Starting and finishing in Siena, Italy, it was the fifth event of the 2019 UCI World Tour. It was won by Julian Alaphilippe, followed by Jakob Fuglsang. Wout van Aert was third.

== Route ==
The route is identical to that of the 2018 event, containing 63 km (39 mi) of gravel roads spread across 11 sectors, for a total distance of 184 km (114 mi).

Sectors of strade bianche
No.	Name	Distance from		Length (km)	Category
No.	Name	Start (km)	Finish (km)	Length (km)	Category
1	Vidritta	17.6	160.3	2.1	*
2	Bagnaia	25	153.2	4.7	*
3	Radi	36.9	142.7	4.4	*
4	La piana	47.6	130.9	5.5	*
5	Lucignano d'Asso	75.8	96.3	11.9	*
6	Pieve a Salti	88.7	87.3	8.0	*
7	San Martino in Grania	111.3	63.2	9.5	*
8	Monte Sante Marie (Settore Cancellara)	130	42.5	11.5	*
9	Monteaperti	160	23.6	0.8	*
10	Colle Pinzuto	164.6	17	2.4	*
11	Le Tolfe	171	11.9	1.1	*

== Result ==
Result
Rank	Rider	Team	Time
1	Julian Alaphilippe (FRA)	Deceuninck–Quick-Step	4h 47' 14"
2	Jakob Fuglsang (DEN)	Astana	+ 2"
3	Wout Van Aert (BEL)	Team Jumbo–Visma	+ 27"
4	Zdeněk Štybar (CZE)	Deceuninck–Quick-Step	+ 1' 00"
5	Tiesj Benoot (BEL)	Lotto–Soudal	+ 1' 00"
6	Greg Van Avermaet (BEL)	CCC Team	+ 1' 01"
7	Alexey Lutsenko (KAZ)	Astana	+ 1' 04"
8	Simon Clarke (AUS)	EF Education First	+ 1' 08"
9	Toms Skujiņš (LVA)	Trek–Segafredo	+ 1' 12"
10	Tim Wellens (BEL)	Lotto–Soudal	+ 1' 21"
