= 2015 Team Novo Nordisk season =

Team Novo Nordisk
- 2015 season
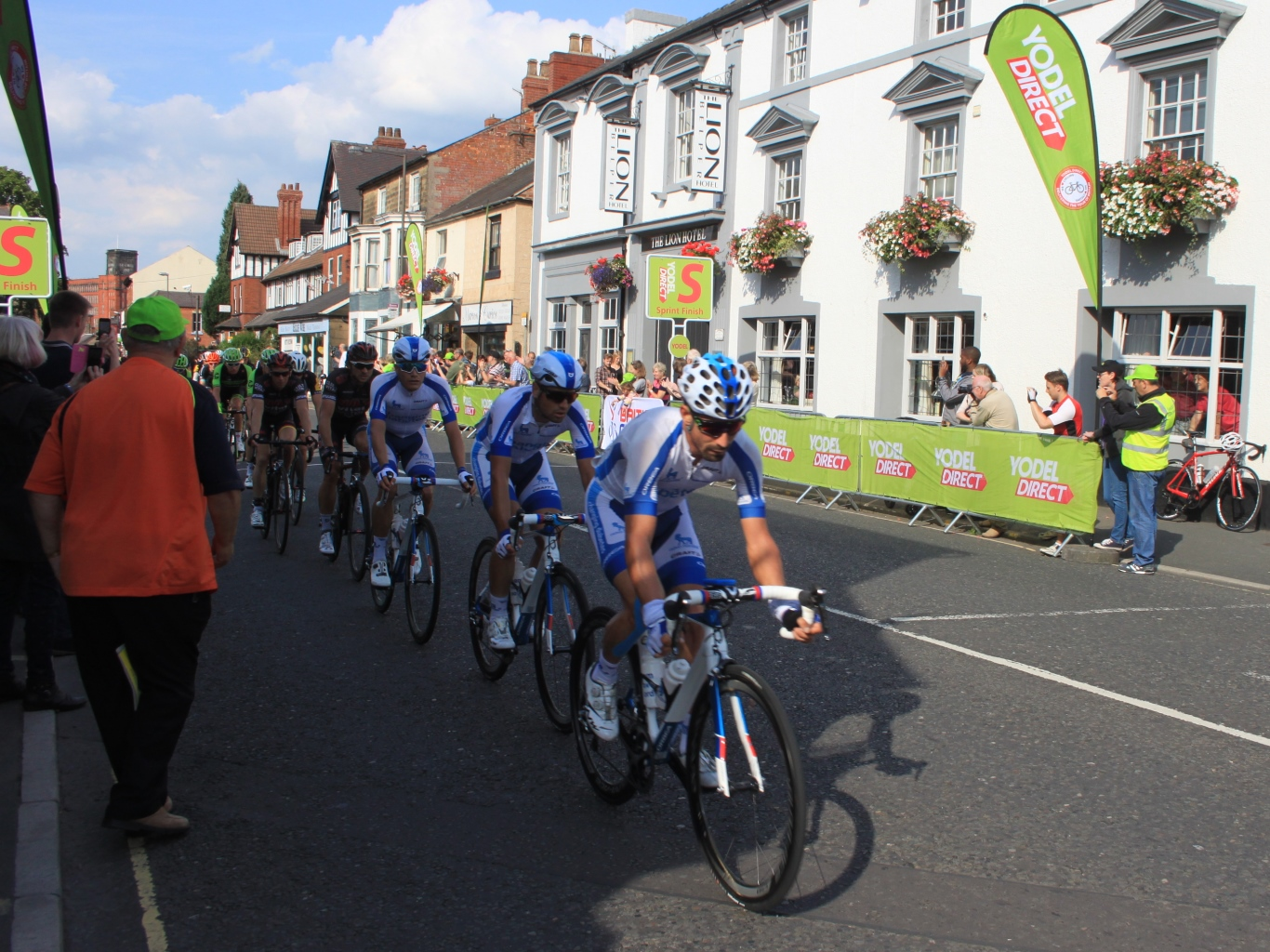
- Team Novo ordisk lead the final group of riders on the 2015 Tour of Britain through Belper in Derbushire.
- UCI code: TNN
- Status: UCI Professional Continental
- Manager: Vassili Davidenko
- Main sponsor(s): Novo Nordisk
- Based: United States
- Bicycles: Orbea

Season victories
- One-day races: -
- Stage race overall: -
- Stage race stages: 1

The 2015 season for the Team Novo Nordisk cycling team began in January at the Tour de San Luis. The team participated in UCI Continental Circuits and UCI World Tour events when given a wildcard invitation.

== Team roster ==
As of February 7, 2015.

Rider	Date of birth
Scott Ambrose (NZL)	January 23, 1995 (age 31)
Corentin Cherhal (FRA)	January 19, 1994 (age 32)
Stephen Clancy (IRL)	July 19, 1992 (age 33)
Ruud Cremers (NED)	February 1, 1992 (age 34)
Kevin De Mesmaeker (BEL)	July 24, 1991 (age 34)
Ben Dilley (USA)	September 18, 1991 (age 34)
James Glasspool (AUS)	August 6, 1991 (age 34)
Joonas Henttala (FIN)	September 17, 1991 (age 34)
Nicolas Lefrançois (FRA)	April 27, 1987 (age 39)

Rider	Date of birth
David Lozano (ESP)	December 21, 1988 (age 37)
Javier Mejías (ESP)	September 30, 1983 (age 42)
Andrea Peron (ITA)	October 28, 1988 (age 37)
Charles Planet (FRA)	October 30, 1993 (age 32)
Thomas Raeymaekers (BEL)	May 22, 1993 (age 32)
Simon Strobel (GER)	August 10, 1986 (age 39)
Martijn Verschoor (NED)	May 4, 1985 (age 40)
Christopher Williams (AUS)	November 10, 1981 (age 44)

Riders who joined the team for the 2015 season

Rider	2014 team
Scott Ambrose	neo-pro (ChasterMason Giant Racing)
Corentin Cherhal	neo-pro (Novo Nordisk Development)
Gerd de Keijzer	neo-pro (Novo Nordisk Development)
James Glasspool	neo-pro (Novo Nordisk Development)
Simon Strobel	neo-pro (Novo Nordisk Development)

Riders who left the team during or after the 2014 season

Rider	2015 team
Paolo Cravanzola	Retired
Joe Eldridge	Retired
Justin Morris	Retired
Aaron Perry	Retired

== Season victories ==
Date	Race	Competition	Rider	Country	Location
February 2	Tour de Filipinas, Stage 2	UCI Asia Tour	Scott Ambrose (NZL)	Philippines	Iba
February 4	Tour de Filipinas, Points classification	UCI Asia Tour	Scott Ambrose (NZL)	Philippines	
