= 2014 Team Novo Nordisk season =

Cycling team season

2014 Team Novo Nordisk season
Manager	Vassili Davidenko
One-day victories	–
Stage race overall victories	–
Stage race stage victories	–
Previous season • Next season

The 2014 season for the Team Novo Nordisk cycling team began in January at the Tour de San Luis. The team participated in UCI Continental Circuits and UCI World Tour events when given a wildcard invitation.

== 2014 roster ==
As of February 2, 2014.

Rider	Date of birth
Stephen Clancy (IRL)	July 19, 1992 (age 33)
Paolo Cravanzola (ITA)	October 3, 1986 (age 39)
Ruud Cremers (NED)	February 1, 1992 (age 33)
Kevin De Mesmaeker (BEL)	July 24, 1991 (age 34)
Ben Dilley (USA)	September 18, 1991 (age 34)
Joe Eldridge (USA)	June 16, 1982 (age 43)
Joonas Henttala (FIN)	September 17, 1991 (age 34)
Nicolas Lefrançois (FRA)	April 27, 1987 (age 38)
David Lozano (ESP)	December 21, 1988 (age 36)

Rider	Date of birth
Javier Mejías (ESP)	September 30, 1983 (age 42)
Justin Morris (AUS)	June 19, 1986 (age 39)
Andrea Peron (ITA)	October 28, 1988 (age 37)
Aaron Perry (NZL)	June 11, 1987 (age 38)
Charles Planet (FRA)	October 30, 1993 (age 32)
Thomas Raeymaekers (BEL)	May 22, 1993 (age 32)
Martijn Verschoor (NED)	May 4, 1985 (age 40)
Christopher Williams (AUS)	November 10, 1981 (age 44)

Riders who joined the team for the 2014 season

Rider	2013 team
Ruud Cremers	neo-pro
Benjamin Dilley	neo-pro
Nicolas Lefrançois	neo-pro (ES Torigni)
Charles Planet	neo-pro

Riders who left the team during or after the 2013 season

Rider	2014 team
Fabio Calabria	
Andrea Ciacchini	
Branden Russell	
Andrei Strelkov	
