= 2023 Tour de Pologne =

80th Tour de Pologne road cycling race

2023 UCI World Tour, race 27 of 35

Race details
- Dates: 29 July–4 August 2023
- Stages: 7
- Distance: 1,130.5 km (702.5 mi)
- Winning time: 26h 17' 48"

Results
Jersey awarded to the overall winner	Winner	Matej Mohorič (SLO)	(Team Bahrain Victorious)
	Second	João Almeida (POR)	(UAE Team Emirates)
	Third	Michał Kwiatkowski (POL)	(Ineos Grenadiers)
Jersey awarded to the mountains classification winner	Mountains	Markus Hoelgaard (NOR)	(Lidl–Trek)
Jersey awarded to the sprints classification winner	Sprints	Matej Mohorič (SLO)	(Team Bahrain Victorious)
Jersey awarded to the combativity classification winner	Combativity	Patryk Stosz (POL)	(Poland)
	Team	(United Arab Emirates) UAE Team Emirates	

The 2023 Tour de Pologne was the 80th edition of the Tour de Pologne road cycling stage race, which was part of the 2023 UCI World Tour. It began on the 29th of July in Poznań and finished on the 4th of August in Kraków.

== Teams ==
All eighteen UCI WorldTeams, five UCI ProTeams, and the Polish national team make up the twenty-four teams that will participate in the race.

UCI WorldTeams

- AG2R Citroën Team
- Alpecin–Deceuninck
- Arkéa–Samsic
- Astana Qazaqstan Team
- Bora–Hansgrohe
- Cofidis
- EF Education–EasyPost
- Groupama–FDJ
- Ineos Grenadiers
- Intermarché–Circus–Wanty
- Lidl–Trek
- Movistar Team
- Soudal–Quick-Step
- Team DSM–Firmenich
- Team Bahrain Victorious
- Team Jayco–AlUla
- Team Jumbo–Visma
- UAE Team Emirates

UCI ProTeams

- Human Powered Health
- Lotto–Dstny
- Q36.5 Pro Cycling Team
- Team Novo Nordisk
- Tudor Pro Cycling Team

National Teams

- Poland

== Schedule ==
Stage characteristics and winners
Stage	Date	Course	Distance	Type	Stage winner
1	29 July	Poznań to Poznań	183.7 km (114.1 mi)	Flat stage	Tim Merlier (BEL)
2	30 July	Leszno to Karpacz	202.9 km (126.1 mi)	Hilly stage	Matej Mohorič (SLO)
3	31 July	Wałbrzych to Duszniki-Zdrój	163.3 km (101.5 mi)	Hilly stage	Rafał Majka (POL)
4	1 August	Strzelin to Opole	198.6 km (123.4 mi)	Flat stage	Olav Kooij (NED)
5	2 August	Pszczyna to Bielsko-Biała	198.8 km (123.5 mi)	Hilly stage	Marijn van den Berg (NED)
6	3 August	Katowice to Katowice	16.6 km (10.3 mi)	Individual time trial	Mattia Cattaneo (ITA)
7	4 August	Zabrze to Kraków	166.6 km (103.5 mi)	Hilly stage	Tim Merlier (BEL)
Total			1,130.5 km (702.5 mi)		

== Stages ==
=== Stage 1 ===
29 July 2023 – Poznań to Poznań, 183.7 km (114.1 mi)

Stage 1 Result
Rank	Rider	Team	Time
1	Tim Merlier (BEL)	Soudal–Quick-Step	4h 15' 37"
2	Olav Kooij (NED)	Team Jumbo–Visma	+ 0"
3	Fernando Gaviria (COL)	Movistar Team	+ 0"
4	Sam Bennett (IRL)	Bora–Hansgrohe	+ 0"
5	Max Walscheid (GER)	Cofidis	+ 0"
6	Maciej Paterski (POL)	Poland	+ 0"
7	Stanisław Aniołkowski (POL)	Human Powered Health	+ 0"
8	Jon Aberasturi (ESP)	Lidl–Trek	+ 0"
9	Jakub Mareczko (ITA)	Alpecin–Deceuninck	+ 0"
10	Gerben Thijssen (BEL)	Intermarché–Circus–Wanty	+ 0"

General classification after Stage 1
Rank	Rider	Team	Time
1	Tim Merlier (BEL)	Soudal–Quick-Step	4h 15' 27"
2	Olav Kooij (NED)	Team Jumbo–Visma	+ 0"
3	Fernando Gaviria (COL)	Movistar Team	+ 0"
4	Sam Bennett (IRL)	Bora–Hansgrohe	+ 0"
5	Max Walscheid (GER)	Cofidis	+ 0"
6	Maciej Paterski (POL)	Poland	+ 0"
7	Stanisław Aniołkowski (POL)	Human Powered Health	+ 0"
8	Jon Aberasturi (ESP)	Lidl–Trek	+ 0"
9	Jakub Mareczko (ITA)	Alpecin–Deceuninck	+ 0"
10	Gerben Thijssen (BEL)	Intermarché–Circus–Wanty	+ 0"

=== Stage 2 ===
30 July 2023 – Leszno to Karpacz, 202.9 km (126.1 mi)

Stage 2 Result
Rank	Rider	Team	Time
1	Matej Mohorič (SLO)	Team Bahrain Victorious	4h 56' 59"
2	João Almeida (POR)	UAE Team Emirates	+ 4"
3	Michał Kwiatkowski (POL)	Ineos Grenadiers	+ 4"
4	Oscar Onley (GBR)	Team DSM–Firmenich	+ 4"
5	Ilan Van Wilder (BEL)	Soudal–Quick-Step	+ 4"
6	Lenny Martinez (FRA)	Groupama–FDJ	+ 4"
7	Samuele Battistella (ITA)	Astana Qazaqstan Team	+ 4"
8	Edward Dunbar (IRL)	Team Jayco–AlUla	+ 4"
9	Sylvain Moniquet (BEL)	Lotto–Dstny	+ 4"
10	Rafał Majka (POL)	UAE Team Emirates	+ 4"

General classification after Stage 2
Rank	Rider	Team	Time
1	Matej Mohorič (SLO)	Team Bahrain Victorious	9h 07' 07"
2	João Almeida (POR)	UAE Team Emirates	+ 4"
3	Michał Kwiatkowski (POL)	Ineos Grenadiers	+ 10"
4	Ilan Van Wilder (BEL)	Soudal–Quick-Step	+ 14"
5	Edward Dunbar (IRL)	Team Jayco–AlUla	+ 14"
6	Samuele Battistella (ITA)	Astana Qazaqstan Team	+ 14"
7	Oscar Onley (GBR)	Team DSM–Firmenich	+ 14"
8	Sylvain Moniquet (BEL)	Lotto–Dstny	+ 14"
9	Lenny Martinez (FRA)	Groupama–FDJ	+ 14"
10	Rafał Majka (POL)	UAE Team Emirates	+ 14"

=== Stage 3 ===
31 July 2023 – Wałbrzych to Duszniki-Zdrój, 163.3 km (101.5 mi)

Stage 3 Result
Rank	Rider	Team	Time
1	Rafał Majka (POL)	UAE Team Emirates	4h 07' 55"
2	Matej Mohorič (SLO)	Team Bahrain Victorious	+ 0"
3	Michał Kwiatkowski (POL)	Ineos Grenadiers	+ 0"
4	Ilan Van Wilder (BEL)	Soudal–Quick-Step	+ 0"
5	Oscar Onley (GBR)	Team DSM–Firmenich	+ 0"
6	Christian Scaroni (ITA)	Astana Qazaqstan Team	+ 0"
7	Lenny Martinez (FRA)	Groupama–FDJ	+ 0"
8	Andrea Vendrame (ITA)	AG2R Citroën Team	+ 0"
9	João Almeida (POR)	UAE Team Emirates	+ 0"
10	Sergio Higuita (COL)	Bora–Hansgrohe	+ 0"

General classification after Stage 3
Rank	Rider	Team	Time
1	Matej Mohorič (SLO)	Team Bahrain Victorious	13h 14' 56"
2	Rafał Majka (POL)	UAE Team Emirates	+ 10"
3	João Almeida (POR)	UAE Team Emirates	+ 10"
4	Michał Kwiatkowski (POL)	Ineos Grenadiers	+ 12"
5	Ilan Van Wilder (BEL)	Soudal–Quick-Step	+ 20"
6	Samuele Battistella (ITA)	Astana Qazaqstan Team	+ 20"
7	Oscar Onley (GBR)	Team DSM–Firmenich	+ 20"
8	Edward Dunbar (IRL)	Team Jayco–AlUla	+ 20"
9	Lenny Martinez (FRA)	Groupama–FDJ	+ 20"
10	Sylvain Moniquet (BEL)	Lotto–Dstny	+ 20"

=== Stage 4 ===
1 August 2023 – Strzelin to Opole, 198.6 km (123.4 mi)

Stage 4 Result
Rank	Rider	Team	Time
1	Olav Kooij (NED)	Team Jumbo–Visma	4h 23' 15"
2	Marijn van den Berg (NED)	EF Education–EasyPost	+ 0"
3	Matteo Moschetti (ITA)	Q36.5 Pro Cycling Team	+ 0"
4	Max Walscheid (GER)	Cofidis	+ 0"
5	Sam Bennett (IRL)	Bora–Hansgrohe	+ 0"
6	Jakub Mareczko (ITA)	Alpecin–Deceuninck	+ 0"
7	Tim Merlier (BEL)	Soudal–Quick-Step	+ 0"
8	Arvid de Kleijn (NED)	Tudor Pro Cycling Team	+ 0"
9	Lionel Taminiaux (BEL)	Alpecin–Deceuninck	+ 0"
10	Matyáš Kopecký (CZE)	Team Novo Nordisk	+ 0"

General classification after Stage 4
Rank	Rider	Team	Time
1	Matej Mohorič (SLO)	Team Bahrain Victorious	17h 38' 11"
2	João Almeida (POR)	UAE Team Emirates	+ 10"
3	Rafał Majka (POL)	UAE Team Emirates	+ 10"
4	Michał Kwiatkowski (POL)	Ineos Grenadiers	+ 12"
5	Edward Dunbar (IRL)	Team Jayco–AlUla	+ 20"
6	Ilan Van Wilder (BEL)	Soudal–Quick-Step	+ 20"
7	Oscar Onley (GBR)	Team DSM–Firmenich	+ 20"
8	Samuele Battistella (ITA)	Astana Qazaqstan Team	+ 20"
9	Lenny Martinez (FRA)	Groupama–FDJ	+ 20"
10	Sylvain Moniquet (BEL)	Lotto–Dstny	+ 20"

=== Stage 5 ===
2 August 2023 – Pszczyna to Bielsko-Biała, 198.8 km (123.5 mi)

Stage 5 Result
Rank	Rider	Team	Time
1	Marijn van den Berg (NED)	EF Education–EasyPost	4h 51' 27"
2	Matej Mohorič (SLO)	Team Bahrain Victorious	+ 0"
3	João Almeida (POR)	UAE Team Emirates	+ 0"
4	Michał Kwiatkowski (POL)	Ineos Grenadiers	+ 0"
5	Finn Fisher-Black (NZL)	UAE Team Emirates	+ 0"
6	Andreas Kron (DEN)	Lotto–Dstny	+ 0"
7	Sergio Higuita (COL)	Bora–Hansgrohe	+ 0"
8	Lewis Askey (GBR)	Groupama–FDJ	+ 0"
9	Cristian Scaroni (ITA)	Astana Qazaqstan Team	+ 0"
10	Marcin Budziński (POL)	Poland	+ 0"

General classification after Stage 5
Rank	Rider	Team	Time
1	Matej Mohorič (SLO)	Team Bahrain Victorious	22h 29' 32"
2	João Almeida (POR)	UAE Team Emirates	+ 12"
3	Rafał Majka (POL)	UAE Team Emirates	+ 16"
4	Michał Kwiatkowski (POL)	Ineos Grenadiers	+ 18"
5	Oscar Onley (GBR)	Team DSM–Firmenich	+ 26"
6	Edward Dunbar (IRL)	Team Jayco–AlUla	+ 26"
7	Ilan Van Wilder (BEL)	Soudal–Quick-Step	+ 26"
8	Samuele Battistella (ITA)	Astana Qazaqstan Team	+ 26"
9	Sylvain Moniquet (BEL)	Lotto–Dstny	+ 26"
10	Lenny Martinez (FRA)	Groupama–FDJ	+ 26"

=== Stage 6 ===
3 August 2023 – Katowice to Katowice, 16.6 km (10.3 mi) (ITT)

Stage 6 Result
Rank	Rider	Team	Time
1	Mattia Cattaneo (ITA)	Soudal–Quick-Step	19' 10"
2	João Almeida (POR)	UAE Team Emirates	+ 13"
3	Geraint Thomas (GBR)	Ineos Grenadiers	+ 14"
4	Finn Fisher-Black (NZL)	UAE Team Emirates	+ 16"
5	Tim Wellens (BEL)	UAE Team Emirates	+ 17"
6	Ilan Van Wilder (BEL)	Soudal–Quick-Step	+ 18"
7	Kévin Vauquelin (FRA)	Arkéa–Samsic	+ 18"
8	Michał Kwiatkowski (POL)	Ineos Grenadiers	+ 21"
9	Tobias Foss (NOR)	Team Jumbo–Visma	+ 21"
10	Brandon McNulty (USA)	UAE Team Emirates	+ 24"

General classification after Stage 6
Rank	Rider	Team	Time
1	Matej Mohorič (SLO)	Team Bahrain Victorious	22h 49' 07"
2	João Almeida (POR)	UAE Team Emirates	+ 0"
3	Michał Kwiatkowski (POL)	Ineos Grenadiers	+ 14"
4	Ilan Van Wilder (BEL)	Soudal–Quick-Step	+ 19"
5	Mattia Cattaneo (ITA)	Soudal–Quick-Step	+ 38"
6	Brandon McNulty (USA)	UAE Team Emirates	+ 39"
7	Edward Dunbar (IRL)	Team Jayco–AlUla	+ 52"
8	Rafał Majka (POL)	UAE Team Emirates	+ 55"
9	Samuele Battistella (ITA)	Astana Qazaqstan Team	+ 57"
10	Oscar Onley (GBR)	Team DSM–Firmenich	+ 1' 04"

=== Stage 7 ===
4 August 2023 – Zabrze to Kraków, 166.6 km (103.5 mi)

Stage 7 Result
Rank	Rider	Team	Time
1	Tim Merlier (BEL)	Soudal–Quick-Step	3h 28' 44"
2	Arvid de Kleijn (NED)	Tudor Pro Cycling Team	+ 0"
3	Fernando Gaviria (COL)	Movistar Team	+ 0"
4	Gerben Thijssen (BEL)	Intermarché–Circus–Wanty	+ 0"
5	Paul Penhoët (FRA)	Groupama–FDJ	+ 0"
6	Stanisław Aniołkowski (POL)	Human Powered Health	+ 0"
7	Pierre Gautherat (FRA)	AG2R Citroën Team	+ 0"
8	Rüdiger Selig (GER)	Lotto–Dstny	+ 0"
9	Matteo Moschetti (ITA)	Q36.5 Pro Cycling Team	+ 0"
10	Andrea Pasqualon (ITA)	Team Bahrain Victorious	+ 0"

General classification after Stage 7
Rank	Rider	Team	Time
1	Matej Mohorič (SLO)	Team Bahrain Victorious	26h 17' 48"
2	João Almeida (POR)	UAE Team Emirates	+ 1"
3	Michał Kwiatkowski (POL)	Ineos Grenadiers	+ 17"
4	Ilan Van Wilder (BEL)	Soudal–Quick-Step	+ 22"
5	Mattia Cattaneo (ITA)	Soudal–Quick-Step	+ 41"
6	Brandon McNulty (USA)	UAE Team Emirates	+ 42"
7	Edward Dunbar (IRL)	Team Jayco–AlUla	+ 55"
8	Rafał Majka (POL)	UAE Team Emirates	+ 58"
9	Samuele Battistella (ITA)	Astana Qazaqstan Team	+ 1' 00"
10	Oscar Onley (GBR)	Team DSM–Firmenich	+ 1' 07"

== Classification leadership table ==
Classification leadership by stage
Stage	Winner	General classification (Polish: Żółta koszulka)	Sprints classification (Polish: Klasyfikacja sprinterska)	Mountains classification (Polish: Klasyfikacja górska)	Active rider classification (Polish: Klasyfikacja najaktywniejszych)	Polish rider classification (Polish: Najlepszy Polak)	Team classification (Polish: Klasyfikacja drużynowa)
1	Tim Merlier	Tim Merlier	Tim Merlier	Norbert Banaszek	Patryk Stosz	Maciej Paterski	Team Jumbo–Visma
2	Matej Mohorič	Matej Mohorič	Matej Mohorič	Lucas Hamilton	Patryk Stosz	Michał Kwiatkowski	UAE Team Emirates
3	Rafał Majka	Matej Mohorič	Matej Mohorič	Jacopo Mosca	Patryk Stosz	Rafał Majka	UAE Team Emirates
4	Olav Kooij	Matej Mohorič	Matej Mohorič	Jacopo Mosca	Patryk Stosz	Rafał Majka	UAE Team Emirates
5	Marijn van den Berg	Matej Mohorič	Matej Mohorič	Markus Hoelgaard	Patryk Stosz	Rafał Majka	UAE Team Emirates
6	Mattia Cattaneo	Matej Mohorič	Matej Mohorič	Markus Hoelgaard	Patryk Stosz	Michał Kwiatkowski	UAE Team Emirates
7	Tim Merlier	Matej Mohorič	Matej Mohorič	Markus Hoelgaard	Patryk Stosz	Michał Kwiatkowski	UAE Team Emirates
Final		Matej Mohorič	Matej Mohorič	Markus Hoelgaard	Patryk Stosz	Michał Kwiatkowski	UAE Team Emirates

== Classification standings ==
Legend
Denotes the winner of the general classification	Denotes the winner of the mountains classification
Denotes the winner of the sprints classification	Denotes the winner of the active rider classification

=== General classification ===
Final general classification (1–10)
Rank	Rider	Team	Time
1	Matej Mohorič (SLO)	Team Bahrain Victorious	26h 17' 48"
2	João Almeida (POR)	UAE Team Emirates	+ 1"
3	Michał Kwiatkowski (POL)	Ineos Grenadiers	+ 17"
4	Ilan Van Wilder (BEL)	Soudal–Quick-Step	+ 22"
5	Mattia Cattaneo (ITA)	Soudal–Quick-Step	+ 41"
6	Brandon McNulty (USA)	UAE Team Emirates	+ 42"
7	Eddie Dunbar (IRL)	Team Jayco–AlUla	+ 55"
8	Rafał Majka (POL)	UAE Team Emirates	+ 58"
9	Samuele Battistella (ITA)	Astana Qazaqstan Team	+ 1' 00"
10	Oscar Onley (GBR)	Team DSM–Firmenich	+ 1' 07"

=== Sprints classification ===
Final sprints classification (1–10)
Rank	Rider	Team	Time
1	Matej Mohorič (SLO)	Team Bahrain Victorious	68
2	João Almeida (POR)	UAE Team Emirates	68
3	Michał Kwiatkowski (POL)	Ineos Grenadiers	66
4	Marijn van den Berg (NED)	EF Education–EasyPost	61
5	Tim Merlier (BEL)	Soudal–Quick-Step	54
6	Ilan Van Wilder (BEL)	Soudal–Quick-Step	48
7	Oscar Onley (GBR)	Team DSM–Firmenich	43
8	Fernando Gaviria (COL)	Movistar Team	43
9	Stanisław Aniołkowski (POL)	Human Powered Health	38
10	Matteo Moschetti (ITA)	Q36.5 Pro Cycling Team	38

=== Mountains classification ===
Final mountains classification (1–10)
Rank	Rider	Team	Time
1	Markus Hoelgaard (NOR)	Lidl–Trek	25
2	Jacopo Mosca (ITA)	Lidl–Trek	18
3	Thomas De Gendt (BEL)	Lotto–Dstny	17
4	Bert van Lerberghe (BEL)	Soudal–Quick-Step	8
5	Tobias Lund Andresen (DEN)	Team DSM–Firmenich	6
6	Damiano Caruso (ITA)	Team Bahrain Victorious	5
7	Lucas Hamilton (AUS)	Team Jayco–AlUla	5
8	Christian Scaroni (ITA)	Astana Qazaqstan Team	5
9	Dorian Godon (FRA)	AG2R Citroën Team	4
10	Andreas Kron (DEN)	Lotto–Dstny	4

=== Active rider classification ===
Final active rider classification (1–10)
Rank	Rider	Team	Time
1	Patryk Stosz (POL)	Poland	18
2	Bert van Lerberghe (BEL)	Soudal–Quick-Step	6
3	Sebastian Schönberger (AUT)	Human Powered Health	6
4	Filippo Ridolfo (ITA)	Team Novo Nordisk	6
5	Markus Hoelgaard (NOR)	Lidl–Trek	5
6	Tobias Lund Andresen (DEN)	Team DSM–Firmenich	4
7	Norbert Banaszek (POL)	Poland	4
8	Matej Mohorič (SLO)	Team Bahrain Victorious	3
9	Sam Brand (GBR)	Team Novo Nordisk	3
10	João Almeida (POR)	UAE Team Emirates	2

=== Team classification ===
Final team classification (1–10)
Rank	Team	Time
1	(United Arab Emirates) UAE Team Emirates	78h 54' 32"
2	(Belgium) Soudal–Quick-Step	+ 1' 33"
3	(United Kingdom) Ineos Grenadiers	+ 5' 43"
4	(France) AG2R Citroën Team	+ 5' 45"
5	(Australia) Team Jayco–AlUla	+ 6' 29"
6	Team Bahrain Victorious	+ 8' 28"
7	(Kazakhstan) Astana Qazaqstan Team	+ 9' 03"
8	(Germany) Bora–Hansgrohe	+ 10' 40"
9	(Netherlands) Team DSM–Firmenich	+ 11' 27"
10	(Netherlands) Team Jumbo–Visma	+ 11' 40"
