= Umberto Poli =

Umberto Poli may refer to:

- Umberto Saba (1883–1957), Italian poet and novelist, born Umberto Poli
- Umberto Poli (cyclist) (born 1996), Italian cyclist
