= 2018 GP Industria & Artigianato di Larciano =

- 2018 UCI Europe Tour

Race details
- Dates: 4 March 2018
- Stages: 1
- Distance: 199.2 km (123.8 mi)
- Winning time: 4h 39' 23"

Results
	Winner	Matej Mohorič (SLO)	(Bahrain–Merida)
	Second	Marco Canola (ITA)	(Nippo–Vini Fantini–Europa Ovini)
	Third	Davide Ballerini (ITA)	(Androni Giocattoli–Sidermec)

The 2018 GP Industria & Artigianato di Larciano was the 50th edition of the GP Industria & Artigianato di Larciano road cycling one day race. It was part of UCI Europe Tour in category 1.HC.

== Teams ==
Twenty-four teams were invited to take part in the race. These included seven UCI World Tour teams, ten UCI Professional Continental teams, six UCI Continental teams and one national team.

UCI WorldTeams

- Mitchelton–BikeExchange
- Movistar Team
- Bora–Hansgrohe
- Team Katusha–Alpecin
- Bahrain–Merida
- EF Education First–Drapac p/b Cannondale
- Groupama–FDJ

UCI Professional Continental teams

- Androni Giocattoli–Sidermec
- Bardiani–CSF
- CCC–Sprandi–Polkowice
- Gazprom–RusVelo
- Nippo–Vini Fantini–Europa Ovini
- Team Novo Nordisk
- Wilier Triestina–Selle Italia
- Israel Cycling Academy
- WB Aqua Protect Veranclassic
- Vérandas Willems–Crelan

UCI Continental teams

- Sangemini–MG.K Vis Vega
- D'Amico Utensilnord
- Trevigiani Phonix–Hemus 1896
- MsTina–Focus
- Biesse–Carrera Gavardo
- Delko–Marseille Provence KTM

National team

- Italy

== Result ==
Result
Rank	Rider	Team	Time
1	Matej Mohorič (SLO)	Bahrain–Merida	4h 39' 23"
2	Marco Canola (ITA)	Nippo–Vini Fantini–Europa Ovini	+ 3"
3	Davide Ballerini (ITA)	Androni Giocattoli–Sidermec	+ 11"
4	Sean De Bie (BEL)	Vérandas Willems–Crelan	+ 11"
5	Mauro Finetto (ITA)	Delko–Marseille Provence KTM	+ 11"
6	Giovanni Visconti (ITA)	Bahrain–Merida	+ 11"
7	Krists Neilands (LAT)	Israel Cycling Academy	+ 11"
8	Daryl Impey (RSA)	Mitchelton–BikeExchange	+ 11"
9	Francesco Gavazzi (ITA)	Androni Giocattoli–Sidermec	+ 11"
10	Nicolás Tivani (ARG)	Trevigiani Phonix–Hemus 1896	+ 11"
