= Sam Brand =

Sam Brand may refer to:

- Samantha Brand (born 1988), Haitian football midfielder
- Sam Brand (cyclist) (born 1995), Manx cyclist
