= Matej Mohorič =

Slovenian professional cyclist

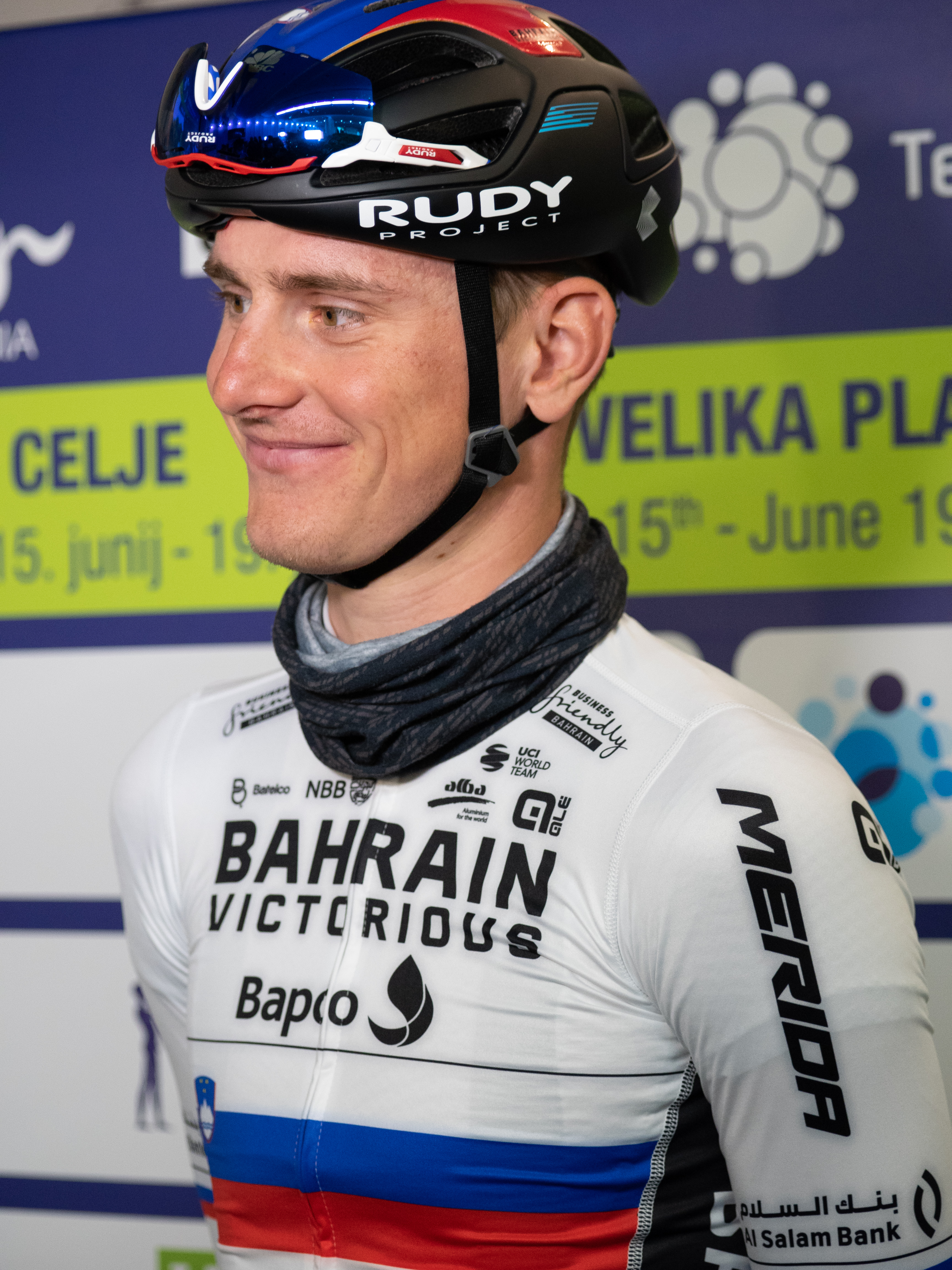
- Mohorič in 2022

Personal information
- Full name: Matej Mohorič
- Born: 19 October 1994 (age 32) Kranj, Slovenia
- Height: 1.85 m (6 ft 1 in)
- Weight: 70 kg (154 lb)

Cycling career
- Sport: Cycling
- Current team: Team Bahrain Victorious
- Discipline: Road
- Role: Rider
- Rider type: Puncheur, Classics specialist

Amateur team
- 2013: Sava

Professional teams
- 2014: Cannondale
- 2015: Cannondale–Garmin
- 2016–2017: Lampre–Merida
- 2018–: Bahrain–Merida

Major wins
- Gravel World Championships (2023) Road Grand Tours Tour de France 3 individual stages (2021, 2023) Giro d'Italia 1 individual stage (2018) Vuelta a España 1 individual stage (2017) Stage races BinckBank Tour (2018) Deutschland Tour (2018) Tour de Pologne (2023) One-day races and Classics National Road Race Championships (2018, 2021) National Time Trial Championships (2024) Milan–San Remo (2022) GP Industria & Artigianato (2018)
Medal record
Representing Slovenia
Men's road bicycle racing
World Championships
Gold medal – first place	2012 Valkenburg	Junior road race
Gold medal – first place	2013 Tuscany	Under-23 road race
Silver medal – second place	2012 Valkenburg	Junior time trial
Men's gravel bicycle racing
World Championships
Gold medal – first place	2023 Veneto	Elite
Bronze medal – third place	2025 South Limburg	Elite

Matej Mohorič (born 19 October 1994) is a Slovenian professional road racing cyclist who currently rides for UCI WorldTeam Team Bahrain Victorious. Mohorič turned professional in 2014. He won the Slovenian National Road Race Championships in 2018 and 2021, and the UCI Gravel World Championships in 2023.

== Early and personal life ==
Born on 19 October 1994, in Kranj, Slovenia, Mohorič currently resides in Šenčur, Slovenia.

== Career ==
Mohorič won the 2012 UCI World Junior Road Race Championships and the 2013 UCI World Under-23 Road Race Championships, becoming the first rider to win world junior and under-23 titles in consecutive years.

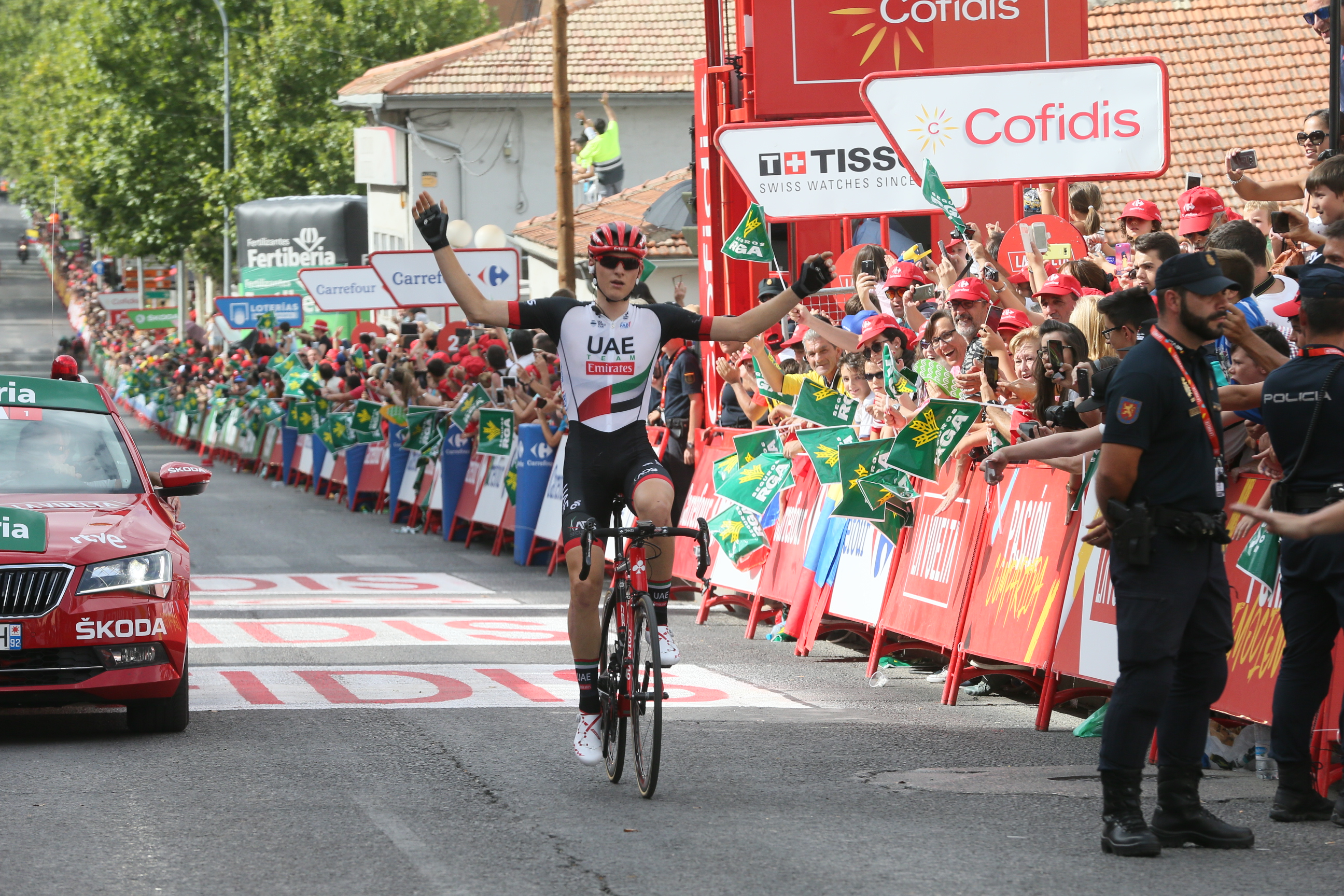
Mohorič celebrating victory on Stage 7 of the 2017 Vuelta a Espana.

He signed with Cannondale, a UCI ProTeam, for the 2014 season.

Mohorič signed with Cannondale–Garmin, a UCI ProTeam, for the 2015 season. He was named in the start list for the 2015 Vuelta a España, but he withdrew on the 6th stage. Subsequently, it was announced that he would join Lampre–Merida from 2016 on a two-year contract. He was named in the start list for the 2016 Giro d'Italia. Mohorič secured his first Grand Tour stage win when he soloed to victory in Stage 7 of the 2017 Vuelta a España. In Stage 10 of the 2018 Giro d'Italia he took his second win in a Grand Tour, winning a two-man sprint against Nico Denz.

In July 2019, he was named in the startlist for the 2019 Tour de France.

He participated in the 2020 Tour de France and the 2021 Tour de France, garnering two stage wins in the 2021 Tour after crashing out of the Giro two months before. His second victory came the day after a police raid on the Bahrain Victorious hotel stemming from allegations of doping; Mohorič celebrated his win by 'zipping' his lips, adding in a post-race interview, "At the end of the day I’ve got nothing to hide. I don’t care too much."

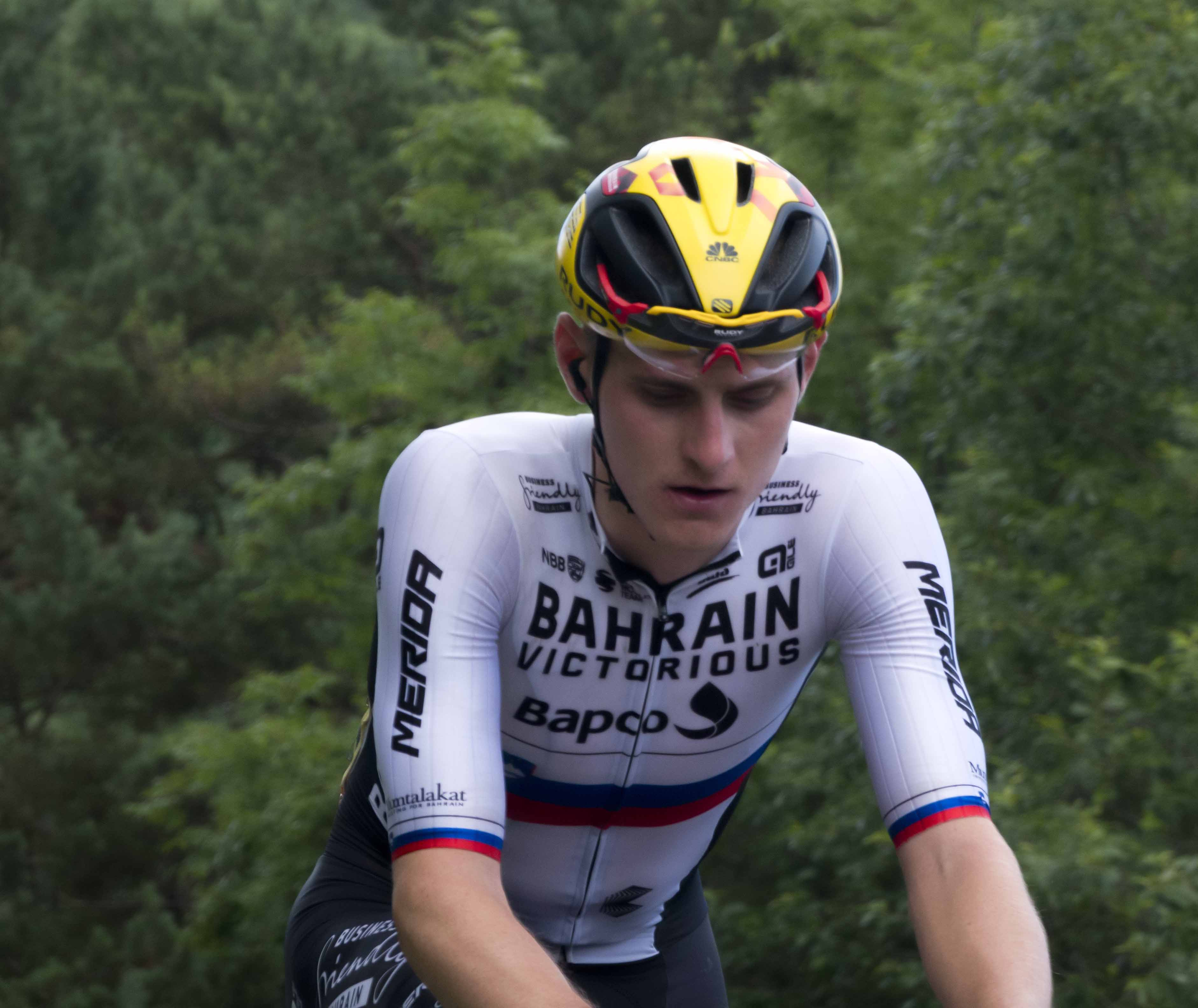
Mohoric at the 2021 Tour de France

In 2022, Mohorič won the Milan-San Remo monument, attacking on the descent of the Poggio using a dropper seatpost. He defeated Jonas Vingegaard to win the 2022 CRO Race.

He won stage 19 of the 2023 Tour de France in a photo finish with Kasper Asgreen, by a margin of 0.004 seconds. He later received praise for his interview after the race, in which he talked about the cruel nature of professional cycling.

After the Tour, Mohoric rode the 2023 Tour de Pologne, where he won stage 2 and took the leader's jersey. Heading into the final stage, Mohoric was tied for the overall lead with João Almeida. During the stage, Mohoric won an intermediate sprint, gaining bonus seconds and winning the overall by a single second.

In October 2023, Mohorič won the UCI Gravel World Championships, holding off Florian Vermeersch and Connor Swift during a solo attack in the final 20 km of the 169 km course in Veneto, Italy.

== Major results ==
=== Gravel ===
2023
1st UCI World Championships
2025
3rd UCI World Championships

=== Road ===
2011
3rd Overall GP Général Patton
7th Overall Regio-Tour
2012
UCI World Junior Championships

1st Road race
2nd Time trial

1st Overall Giro di Basilicata

1st Points classification
1st Mountains classification
1st Stages 1, 2, 3 (ITT), & 4

1st Overall Giro della Lunigiana
1st Overall Junioren Radrundfahrt Oberösterreich
UEC European Championships

3rd Time trial
4th Road race

2013
1st Road race, UCI World Under-23 Championships
National Championships

4th Road race
4th Time trial

7th Piccolo Giro di Lombardia
2014
5th Time trial, National Championships
2015
5th Road race, National Championships
6th Japan Cup
2016 (1 pro win)
2nd Time trial, National Championships
3rd Overall Tour of Hainan

1st Stage 6

2017 (2)
1st Stage 7 Vuelta a España
1st Hong Kong Challenge
3rd Road race, National Championships
6th Overall Tour of Guangxi
8th Trofeo Laigueglia
2018 (7)
1st Road race, National Championships
1st Overall Deutschland Tour

1st Points classification
1st Young rider classification
1st Stage 3

1st Overall BinckBank Tour
1st GP Industria & Artigianato di Larciano
1st Stage 10 Giro d'Italia
1st Stage 1 Tour of Austria
3rd Overall Tour of Slovenia
7th Giro della Toscana
2019 (1)
1st Stage 7 Tour de Pologne
National Championships

2nd Time trial
5th Road race

3rd Gran Premio di Lugano
5th Milan–San Remo
9th Gent–Wevelgem
2020
3rd Road race, National Championships
4th Liège–Bastogne–Liège
10th Milan–San Remo
2021 (4)
1st Road race, National Championships
Tour de France

1st Stages 7 & 19
Held after Stage 7
Combativity award Stages 7 & 19

2nd Overall Benelux Tour

1st Stage 7

2nd Overall Tour de Pologne
2nd Clásica de San Sebastián
7th Overall Tour of Slovenia

1st Points classification

8th Amstel Gold Race
10th Liège–Bastogne–Liège
2022 (2)
1st Overall CRO Race
1st Milan–San Remo
2nd Time trial, National Championships
2nd Gran Piemonte
4th E3 Saxo Bank Classic
5th Paris–Roubaix
9th Gent–Wevelgem
2023 (6)
1st Overall Tour de Pologne

1st Sprints classification
1st Stage 2

1st Stage 19 Tour de France
1st Stage 4 CRO Race
2nd Overall Tour of Slovenia

1st Stage 5

3rd Road race, National Championships
3rd Kuurne–Brussels–Kuurne
5th Grand Prix Cycliste de Québec
6th Strade Bianche
7th Overall Renewi Tour

1st Stage 5

7th E3 Saxo Classic
8th Milan–San Remo
2024 (2)
National Championships

1st Time trial
3rd Road race

1st Stage 2 Volta a la Comunitat Valenciana
3rd Japan Cup
5th Strade Bianche
6th Overall Tour de Pologne
6th Milan–San Remo
8th Overall Renewi Tour
10th Gran Piemonte
2025
2nd Overall Tour de la Provence
5th Grand Prix Cycliste de Québec
2026
8th Tour of Flanders
8th Clásica Jaén Paraíso Interior

==== Grand Tour general classification results timeline ====
Grand Tour	2014	2015	2016	2017	2018	2019	2020	2021	2022	2023	2024	2025
Giro d'Italia	—	—	98	135	30	—	—	DNF	—	—	—	—
Tour de France	—	—	—	—	—	119	76	31	86	72	127	126
Vuelta a España	—	DNF	—	30	—	—	DNF	—	—	—	—	—

==== Classics results timeline ====
Monument	2014	2015	2016	2017	2018	2019	2020	2021	2022	2023	2024	2025	2026
Milan–San Remo	—	—	—	57	25	5	10	11	1	8	6	100	15
Tour of Flanders	—	—	—	—	—	41	—	—	21	DNF	DNF	21	8
Paris–Roubaix	—	—	—	—	—	70	NH	DNF	5	29	—	DNF	DNF
Liège–Bastogne–Liège	127	DNF	—	93	—	36	4	10	37	40	—	—	
Giro di Lombardia	—	—	—	—	56	—	—	DNF	61	—	111	—	
Classic	2014	2015	2016	2017	2018	2019	2020	2021	2022	2023	2024	2025	2026
Omloop Het Nieuwsblad	—	—	—	—	—	—	—	—	17	21	24	152	DNF
Kuurne–Brussels–Kuurne	—	—	—	—	—	—	—	—	50	3	79	DNF	27
Strade Bianche	—	—	—	80	11	—	19	56	DNF	6	5	—	24
E3 Saxo Bank Classic	—	—	—	—	—	27	NH	—	4	7	15	DNF	56
Gent–Wevelgem	—	—	—	—	—	9	—	—	9	43	13	DNF	32
Amstel Gold Race	112	DNF	99	86	—	46	NH	9	13	33	—	—	
Clásica de San Sebastián	—	—	—	—	—	—	NH	2	DNF	—	—	—	
Grand Prix Cycliste de Québec	78	—	65	—	22	36	Not held		54	5	30	5	
Grand Prix Cycliste de Montréal	62	—	28	—	41	26	Not held		DNF	18	DNF	DNF	
Gran Piemonte	—	—	—	—	—	—	—	—	2	—	10	DNF	

==== Major championships results timeline ====
Event		2013	2014	2015	2016	2017	2018	2019	2020	2021	2022	2023	2024	2025
Olympic Games	Road race	Not held			DNF	Not held				—	Not held		DNF	NH
Olympic Games	Time trial	Not held			—	Not held				—	Not held		—	NH
World Championships	Road race	—	—	—	—	91	DNF	DNF	—	14	—	—	—	DNF
World Championships	Time trial	—	56	—	—	—	—	—	—	—	—	—	—	—
National Championships	Road race	4	15	5	7	3	1	5	3	1	—	3	3	—
National Championships	Time trial	4	5	—	2	—	—	2	—	—	2	—	1	—

Legend
—	Did not compete
DNF	Did not finish
