= Corentin Cherhal =

French cyclist

Personal information
- Born: 19 January 1994 (age 32) Rennes, France
- Height: 1.75 m (5 ft 9 in)
- Weight: 60 kg (132 lb)

Cycling career
- Sport: Cycling
- Current team: US Vern Cyclisme
- Discipline: Road
- Role: Rider

Amateur teams
- 2014: Novo Nordisk Development
- 2018: Team Fybolia–Locminé Auto
- 2022–: US Vern Cyclisme

Professional team
- 2015–2017: Team Novo Nordisk

Corentin Cherhal (born 19 January 1994) is a French cyclist who competed professionally for Team Novo Nordisk from 2015 to 2017.
