= Alexander Serebryakov =

Russian bicycle racer

Personal information
- Full name: Alexander Sergeyevich Serebryakov; Russian: Алекса́ндр Серге́евич Серебряко́в
- Born: September 27, 1987 (age 39) Arzamas, Russian SFSR, Soviet Union

Cycling career
- Sport: Cycling
- Current team: Retired
- Discipline: Road
- Role: Rider

Amateur team
- 2008–2011: Sammarinese Gruppo Lupi

Professional teams
- 2006–2007: Premier
- 2012: Team Type 1–Sanofi
- 2013: Euskaltel–Euskadi

Alexander Sergeyevich Serebryakov (Russian: Алекса́ндр Серге́евич Серебряко́в; born September 28, 1987) is a Russian former professional cyclist. During his career, Serebryakov served a four-year doping ban, between April 2013 and April 2017.

== Major results ==
2008
2nd Ruota d'Oro
2010
1st Piccolo Giro di Lombardia
5th GP Industrie del Marmo
7th Ruota d'Oro
2011
1st Giro del Casentino
3rd Grand Prix of Moscow
6th Trofeo Franco Balestra
7th Overall Five Rings of Moscow

1st Stages 3 & 5

2012
1st Philadelphia International Championship
Tour of China I

1st Stages 2 & 5

Tour of China II

1st Stages 1 & 2

5th Kuurne-Brussels-Kuurne
7th Overall Tour de Korea

1st Stage 5

7th Overall Tour of Taihu Lake

1st Stages 3 & 5

Tour of Hainan

1st Points classification
1st Stages 3, 4 & 9
