= 2012 UCI Road World Championships – Men's junior road race =

Men's junior road race
2012 UCI Road World Championships

Race details
- Dates: 21 September 2012
- Stages: 1

The Men's junior road race of the 2012 UCI Road World Championships was a cycling event that took place on 21 September 2012 in Limburg, the Netherlands.

== Final classification ==
	Cyclist	Nation		Time
1	Matej Mohorič	Slovenia	in	3h 00' 45"
2	Caleb Ewan	Australia		s.t.
3	Josip Rumac	Croatia		s.t.
4	Federico Zurlo	Italy		s.t.
5	Jonathan Dibben	Great Britain		s.t.
6	Kevin Deltombe	Belgium		s.t.
7	Thomas Boudat	France		s.t.
8	Tom Bohli	Switzerland		s.t.
9	Mathieu van der Poel	Netherlands		s.t.
10	Søren Kragh Andersen	Denmark		s.t.
