= Scott Ambrose =

New Zealand cyclist (born 1995)

Personal information
- Full name: Scott Ambrose
- Born: 23 January 1995 (age 31) Wellington, New Zealand

Cycling career
- Sport: Cycling
- Current team: Retired
- Discipline: Road
- Role: Rider

Amateur team
- 2014: CharterMason Giant Racing

Professional teams
- 2014: Team Novo Nordisk (stagiaire)
- 2015–2017: Team Novo Nordisk

Scott Ambrose (born 23 January 1995) is a New Zealand former professional racing cyclist, who rode professionally between 2014 and 2017, entirely for Team Novo Nordisk, an all-diabetes team. He won the second stage of the 2015 Tour de Filipinas and finished first in the points classification.

== Biography ==
In Autumn 2013 he was diagnosed with Type I diabetes, after several disappointing sporting results over the course of the year. Following a consultation, his doctor told him he was 10 kg (22 lb) underweight and he had all the symptoms of diabetes. He was taken to hospital after being diagnosed with glycaemia.

Ambrose turned professional in 2015 as part of the Team Novo Nordisk team, whose members all have diabetes. In February 2015, he won the second stage of the Tour de Filipinas.

== Major results ==
2012
3rd Bruce Kent Memorial
3rd Mauku Mountain Classic
3rd Tour de Taranaki
7th Time trial, Oceania Junior Road Championships
2013
2nd The Hub – EMC2 Bikes Cycle Tour
2014
1st Two Up Time Trial Aka Aka
1st Stage 4 Tour de Taranaki
3rd Taranaki Cycle Challenge
2015
Tour de Filipinas

1st Points classification
1st Stage 2
