= Ruud Cremers =

Dutch cyclist

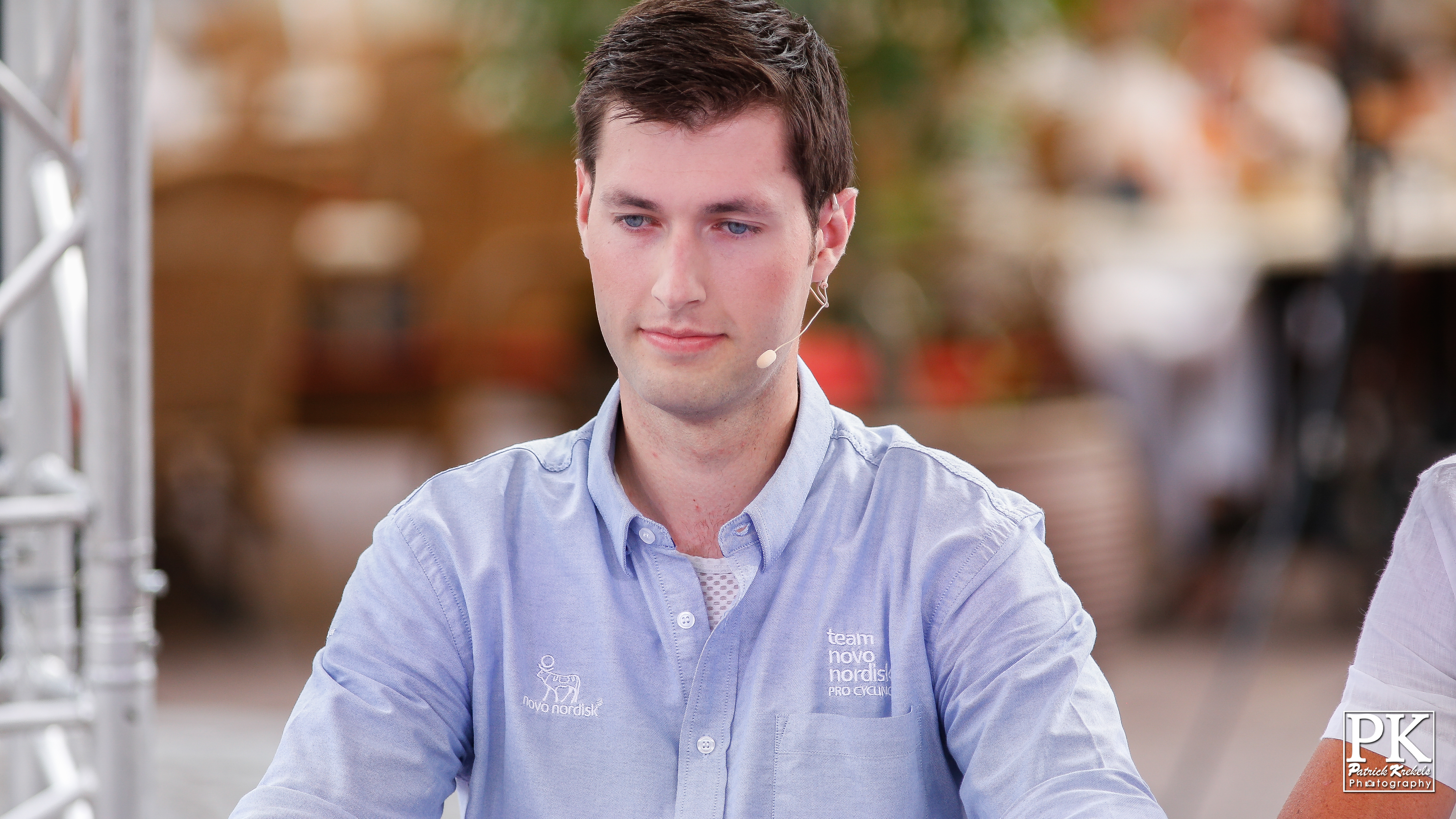

Personal information
- Born: 3 January 1992 (age 34) Gulpen, Netherlands
- Height: 1.93 m (6 ft 4 in)
- Weight: 76 kg (168 lb)

Cycling career
- Sport: Cycling
- Current team: Retired
- Discipline: Road
- Role: Rider

Professional team
- 2014–2016: Team Novo Nordisk

Ruud Cremers (born 3 January 1992 in Gulpen) is a Dutch former cyclist who rode for Team Novo Nordisk from 2014 to 2016.
