= Kevin De Mesmaeker =

Belgian road cyclist

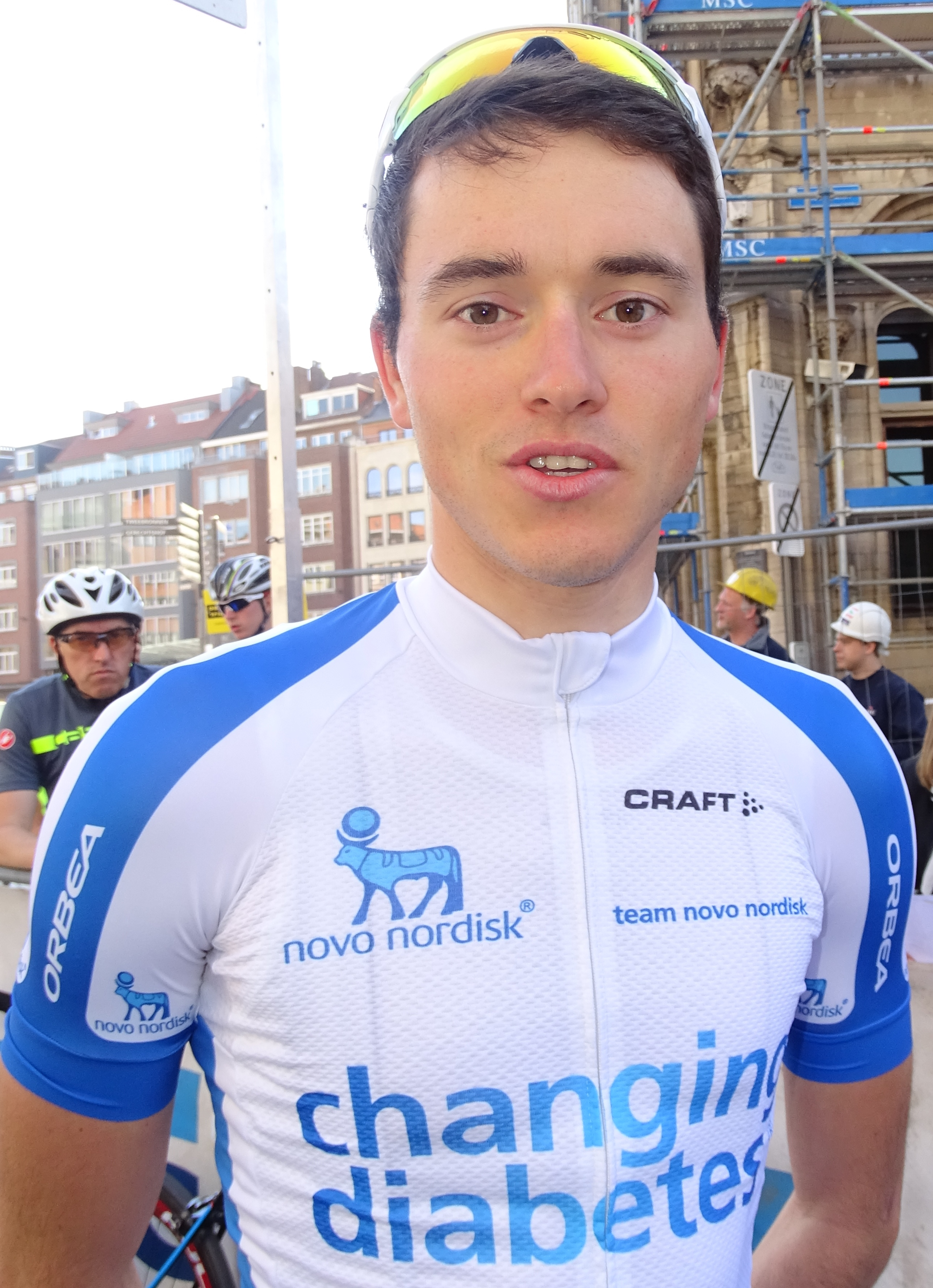
- De Mesmaeker in 2015

Personal information
- Full name: Kevin De Mesmaeker
- Born: 24 July 1991 (age 35) Wetteren, Belgium

Cycling career
- Sport: Cycling
- Current team: Retired
- Discipline: Road
- Role: Rider; Directeur sportif

Professional team
- 2013–2016: Team Novo Nordisk

Managerial team
- 2017–2018: Novo Nordisk Development

Kevin De Mesmaeker (born 24 July 1991) is a Belgian former professional racing cyclist, who competed professionally for Team Novo Nordisk between 2013 and 2016.
