= Charles Planet =

French cyclist

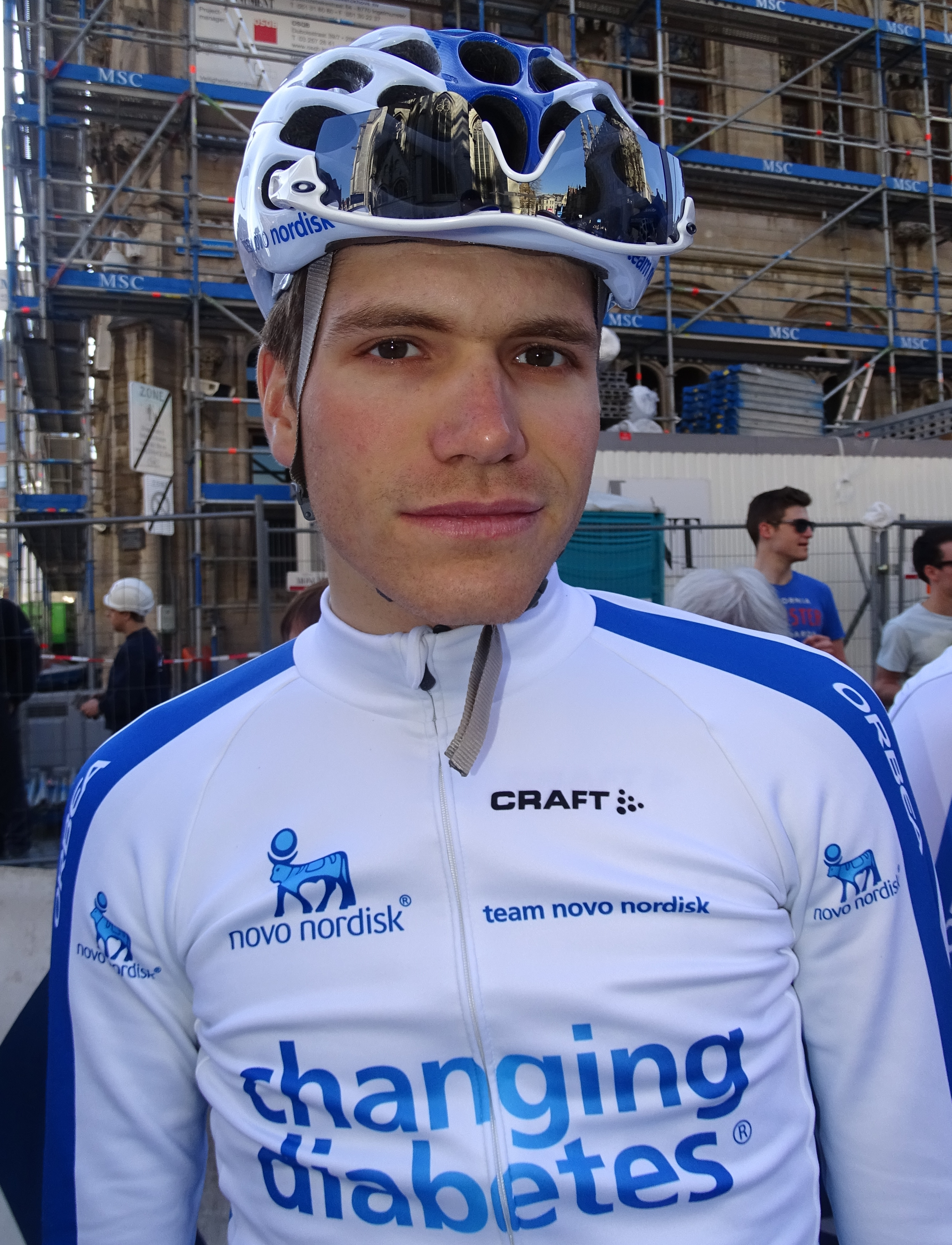
- Planet in 2015

Personal information
- Full name: Charles Planet
- Born: 30 October 1993 (age 32) Remiremont, France

Cycling career
- Sport: Cycling
- Current team: Team Novo Nordisk
- Discipline: Road
- Role: Rider

Amateur teams
- 2011: Look–Beaumes de Venise
- 2013: Remiremont VTT
- 2013: Novo Nordisk Development

Professional team
- 2014–: Team Novo Nordisk

Charles Planet (born 30 October 1993) is a French professional racing cyclist, who currently rides for UCI ProTeam Team Novo Nordisk.

== Major results ==
2018
8th Overall Tour of Estonia
2019
1st Active rider classification Tour de Pologne
7th Overall Tour of Estonia
2020
7th Circuito de Getxo
