= Ben Dilley =

American cyclist (born 1991)

Personal information
- Full name: Benjamin Dilley
- Born: September 18, 1991 (age 35) Lincoln, Nebraska

Cycling career
- Sport: Cycling
- Current team: Retired
- Discipline: Road
- Role: Rider

Professional team
- 2014–2016: Team Novo Nordisk

Benjamin Dilley (born September 18, 1991, in Lincoln, Nebraska) is an American former professional cyclist, who competed for Team Novo Nordisk between 2014 and 2016. He was diagnosed with diabetes at the age of 14.

Dilley now works as a Strength and Conditioning Associate at Purdue University.
