= Umberto Poli (cyclist) =

Italian cyclist

Personal information
- Born: 27 August 1996 (age 30) Verona, Italy

Cycling career
- Sport: Cycling
- Current team: Team Novo Nordisk
- Discipline: Road
- Role: Rider

Amateur team
- 2015–2016: Novo Nordisk Development

Professional team
- 2017–: Team Novo Nordisk

Umberto Poli (born 27 August 1996) is an Italian cyclist, who currently rides for UCI ProTeam Team Novo Nordisk.

== Career ==
He competed at the 2017 Milan–San Remo where he finished 192nd, 17 minutes and 22 seconds behind the winner. He was the youngest rider in the race at 20 years old and did not know he was riding in the race until the Wednesday before. He initially formed part of the breakaway, but fell off at Capo Berta.
