= Kocierz Moszczanicki =

- Village
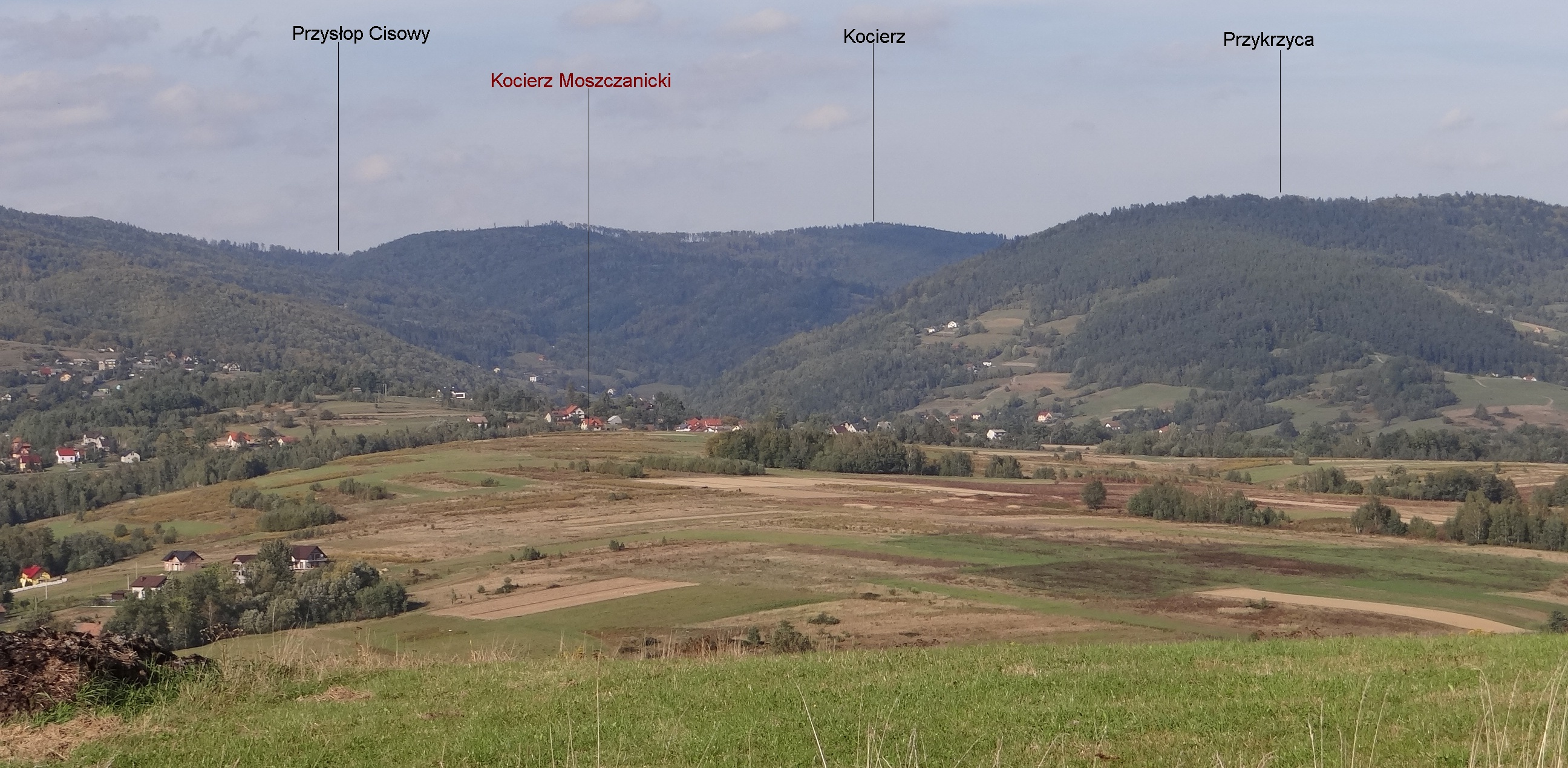
- General view of the village

- Location within Poland
- Coordinates: 49°44′N 19°15′E
- Country: Poland
- Voivodeship: Silesian
- County: Żywiec
- Gmina: Łękawica
- Highest elevation: 700 m (2,300 ft)
- Lowest elevation: 400 m (1,300 ft)

Population
  - Total: 1,013

Kocierz Moszczanicki [ˈkɔt͡ɕɛʂ mɔʂt͡ʂaˈnit͡ski] is a village in the administrative district of Gmina Łękawica, within Żywiec County, Silesian Voivodeship, in southern Poland.
