= Nicolas Lefrançois (cyclist) =

French cyclist

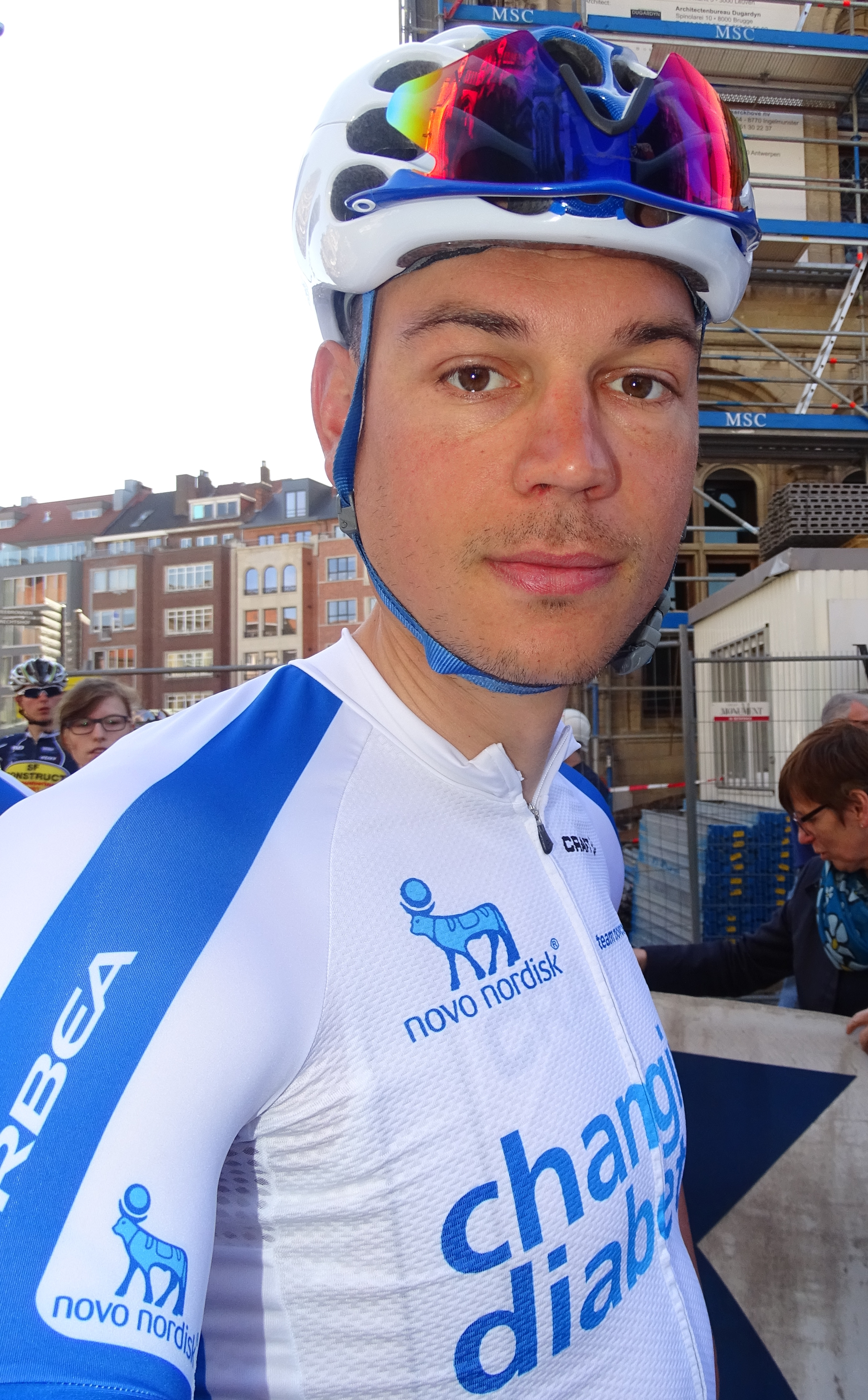
- Lefrançois in 2015

Personal information
- Full name: Nicolas Lefrançois
- Born: 27 April 1987 (age 39) Caen, France

Cycling career
- Sport: Cycling
- Current team: Retired
- Discipline: Road
- Role: Rider

Amateur team
- 2013: Novo Nordisk Development

Professional team
- 2014–2016: Team Novo Nordisk

Nicolas Lefrançois (born 27 April 1987 in Caen) is a French former racing cyclist, who competed professionally for Team Novo Nordisk between 2014 and 2016.
