= Joe Eldridge (cyclist) =

American cyclist (born 1982)

Personal information
- Full name: Joseph Eldridge
- Born: June 16, 1982 (age 44)

Cycling career
- Sport: Cycling
- Current team: Retired
- Discipline: Road
- Role: Rider

Professional team
- 2008–2014: Team Type 1

Joseph Eldridge (born June 16, 1982) is a former American cyclist who spent his entire career riding for Team Novo Nordisk.

He now works as a consultant for the Dutch government.
