= Sam Brand (cyclist) =

Manx cyclist

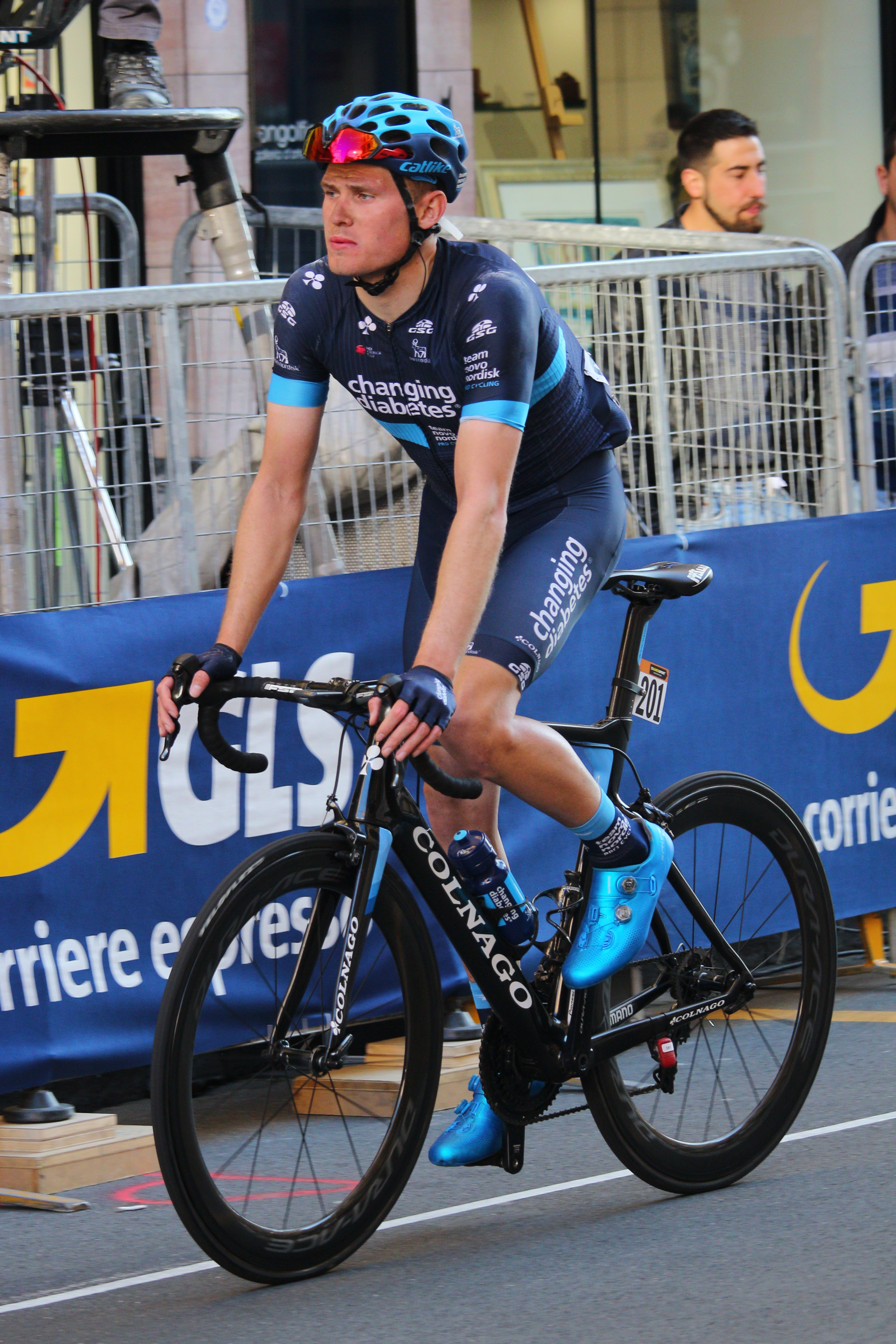
- Brand in 2019

Personal information
- Full name: Samuel Neal Brand
- Born: 27 February 1991 (age 35) Peel, Isle of Man
- Height: 183 cm (6 ft 0 in)

Cycling career
- Sport: Cycling
- Current team: Team Novo Nordisk
- Discipline: Road
- Role: Rider

Amateur teams
- 2016–2017: Team Novo Nordisk Development
- 2017: Team Novo Nordisk (stagiaire)

Professional team
- 2018–: Team Novo Nordisk

Samuel Neal Brand (born 27 February 1991) is a Manx cyclist, who currently rides for UCI ProTeam Team Novo Nordisk.

Brand was diagnosed with diabetes at the age of 10. In 2018, he joined the UCI Professional Continental team Team Novo Nordisk, after riding with the team as a stagiaire in 2017.
