= Martijn Verschoor =

Dutch road racing cyclist

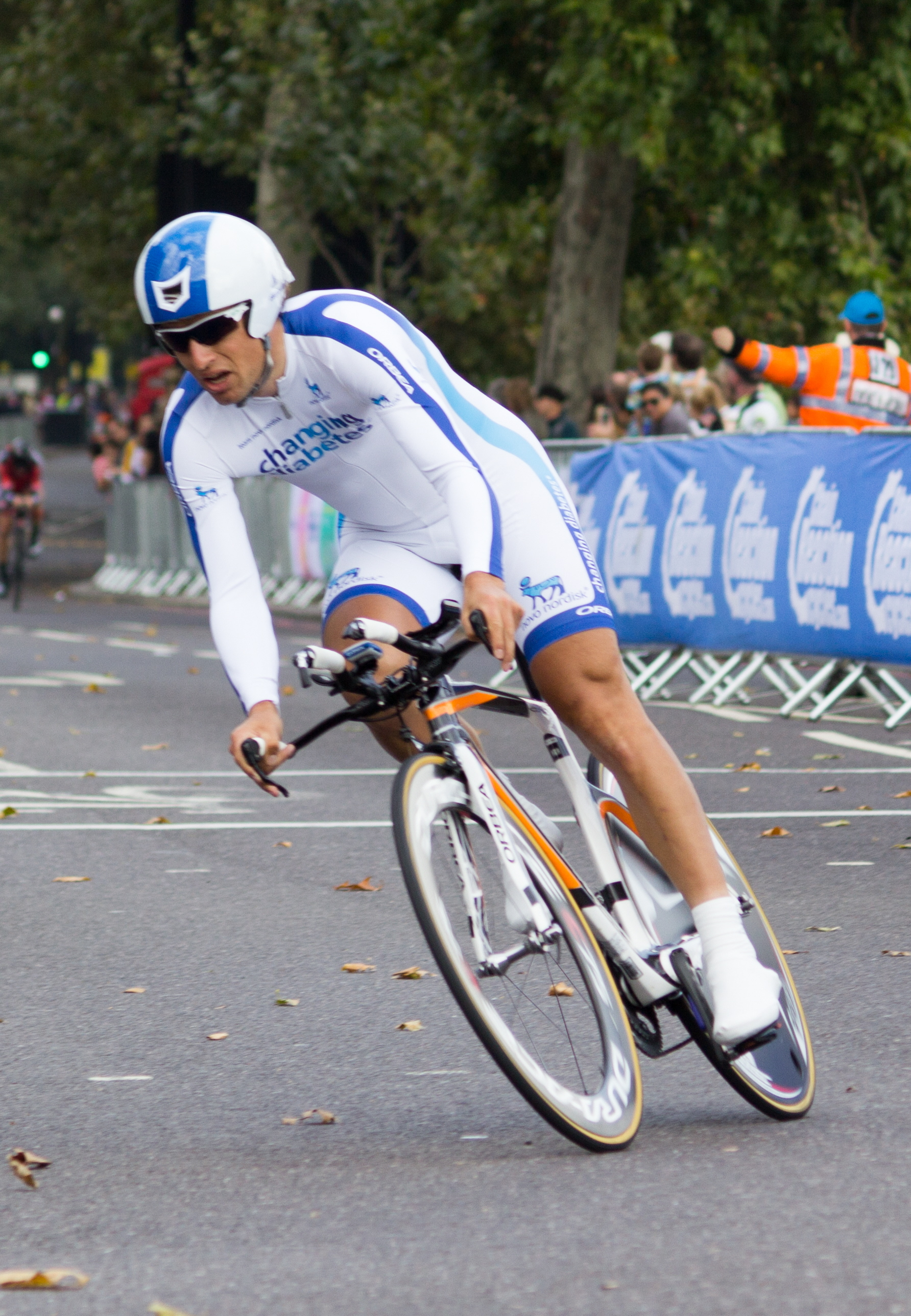

Personal information
- Full name: Martijn Verschoor
- Born: 4 May 1985 (age 41) Bovensmilde, Drenthe, Netherlands
- Height: 1.79 m (5 ft 10 in)
- Weight: 74.5 kg (164 lb)

Cycling career
- Sport: Cycling
- Current team: Retired
- Discipline: Road
- Role: Rider
- Rider type: Sprinter

Amateur teams
- 2008: KrolStonE Continental Team
- 2009: Asito-Craft Cycling Team

Professional team
- 2010–2017: Team Type 1

Martijn Verschoor (born 4 May 1985) is a Dutch former professional road racing cyclist, who competed for Team Novo Nordisk between 2010 and 2017. At the age of thirteen, Verschoor was diagnosed with type 1 diabetes. A graduate of Hanze University, Verschoor was born, raised, and resides in Bovensmilde, Drenthe, Netherlands.

== Major results ==
2008
5th Ronde van Midden-Nederland
2009
4th Ronde van Midden-Nederland
6th Omloop der Kempen
2011
1st Stage 2 Tour de Beauce
10th Mumbai Cyclothon I
2015
5th Overall Tour of Estonia
2016
4th Tour of Yancheng Coastal Wetlands
