= Andrea Peron (cyclist, born 1988) =

Italian racing cyclist

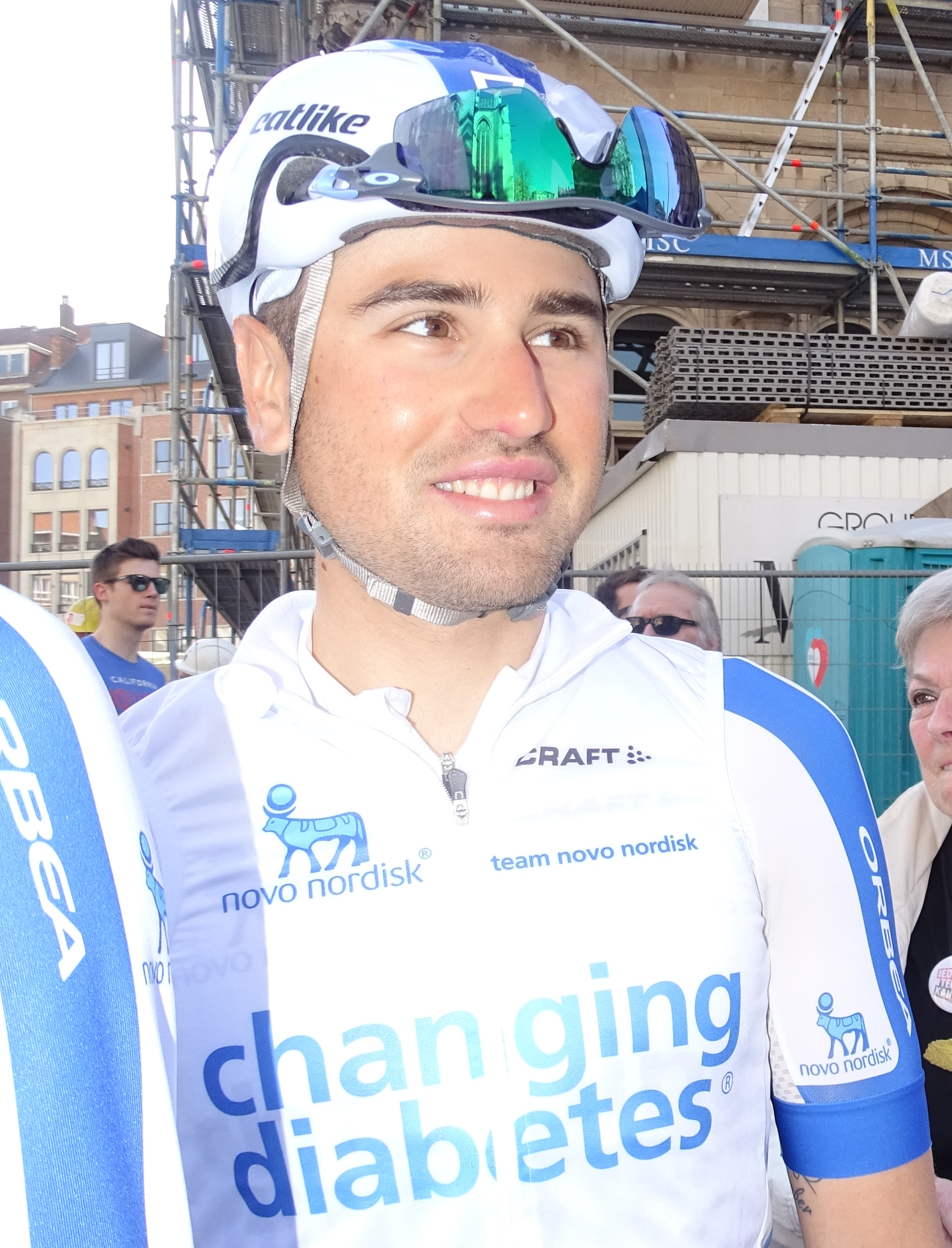
- Peron in 2015.

Personal information
- Full name: Andrea Peron
- Born: 28 October 1988 (age 37) Camposampiero, Veneto, Italy
- Height: 1.76 m (5 ft 9 in)
- Weight: 70 kg (154 lb)

Cycling career
- Sport: Cycling
- Current team: Team Novo Nordisk
- Discipline: Road
- Role: Rider
- Rider type: Sprinter

Amateur teams
- 2007–2008: Molino di Ferro–Giorgione
- 2009–2012: VC Breganze Faresin–Cyber Oleodinamica

Professional team
- 2013–: Team Novo Nordisk

Andrea Peron (born 28 October 1988) is an Italian professional road racing cyclist, who currently rides for UCI ProTeam Team Novo Nordisk.

At the age of sixteen, Peron was diagnosed with type 1 diabetes. Born in Camposampiero, Veneto, Peron currently resides in Borgoricco, Veneto, Italy.

== Major results ==
2013
8th Route Adélie
2014
8th Trofeo Palma
2015
9th Vuelta a La Rioja
2017
10th Overall Tour of Estonia
2019
8th Overall Tour of Estonia
2022
1st GP Kranj
2023
1st Points classification, Tour de la Mirabelle
8th GP Kranj
