= Team Novo Nordisk =

American cycling team

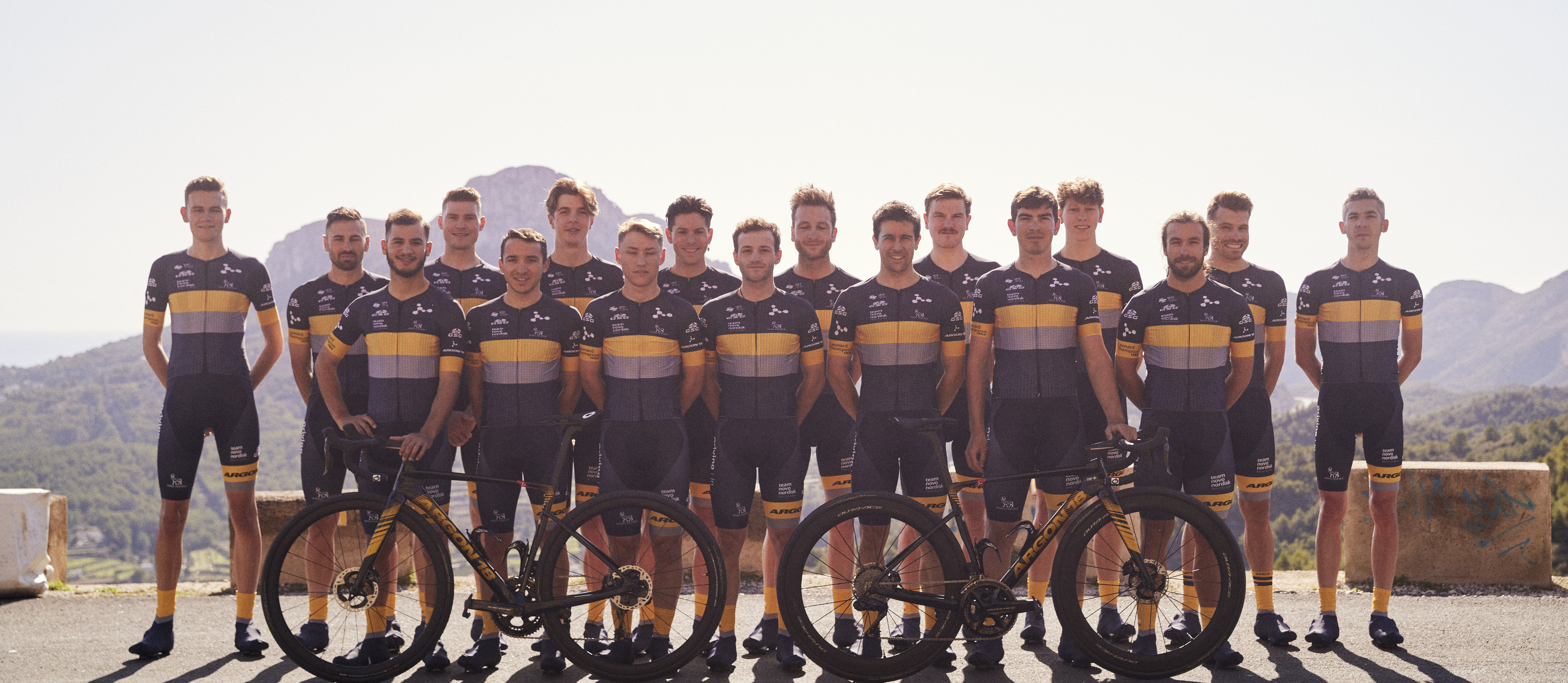

Team information
- UCI code: TNN
- Registered: United States
- Founded: 2008
- Discipline: Road
- Status: UCI ProTeam
- Bicycles: Argon18
- Components: Shimano
- Website: Team home page

Key personnel
- General manager: Vassili Davidenko

Team name history
- 2008–2010 2011 2011–2012 2013–: Team Type 1 (TT1); Team Type 1–Sanofi Aventis (TT1); Team Type 1–Sanofi (TT1); Team Novo Nordisk (TNN)
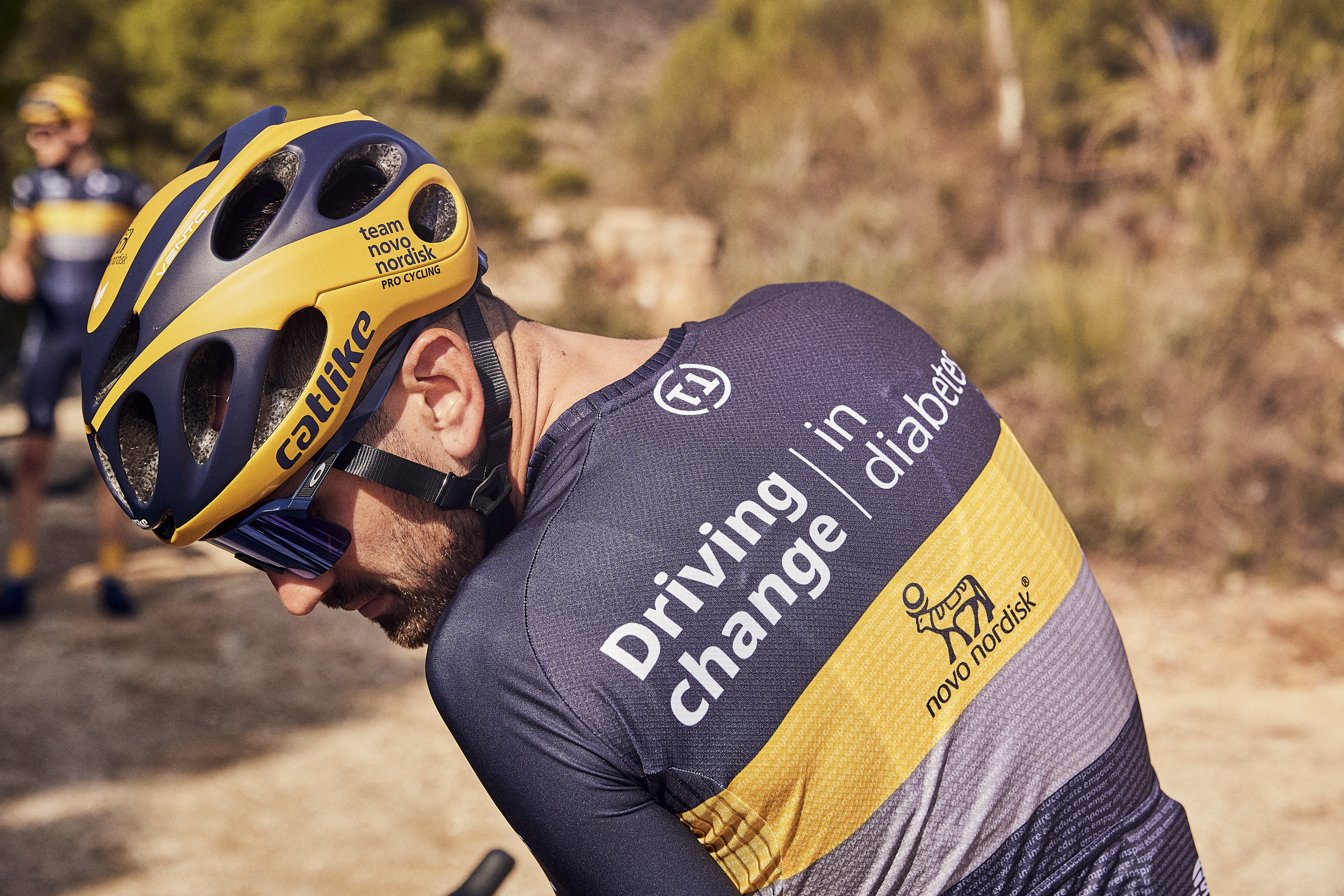
Team Novo Nordisk jersey
Jersey

Team Novo Nordisk (UCI team code: TNN) is an all-diabetic professional cycling team founded by CEO Phil Southerland and led by general manager Vassili Davidenko. It is headquartered in Atlanta, Georgia.

The team's principal sponsor is the Danish global healthcare company, Novo Nordisk. The team is also sponsored by the Canadian bicycle manufacturer Argon18.

== Pro Cycling Team ==
Team Novo Nordisk is the first professional cycling team to be comprised completely of riders who have type 1 diabetes. All riders and several of the team's staff, including CEO and Co-founder Phil Southerland, are living with diabetes.

Team Novo Nordisk is home to a Development Team racing as a UCI Continental team and an Ambassador program formed by elite and former professional athletes living with diabetes.

== History ==
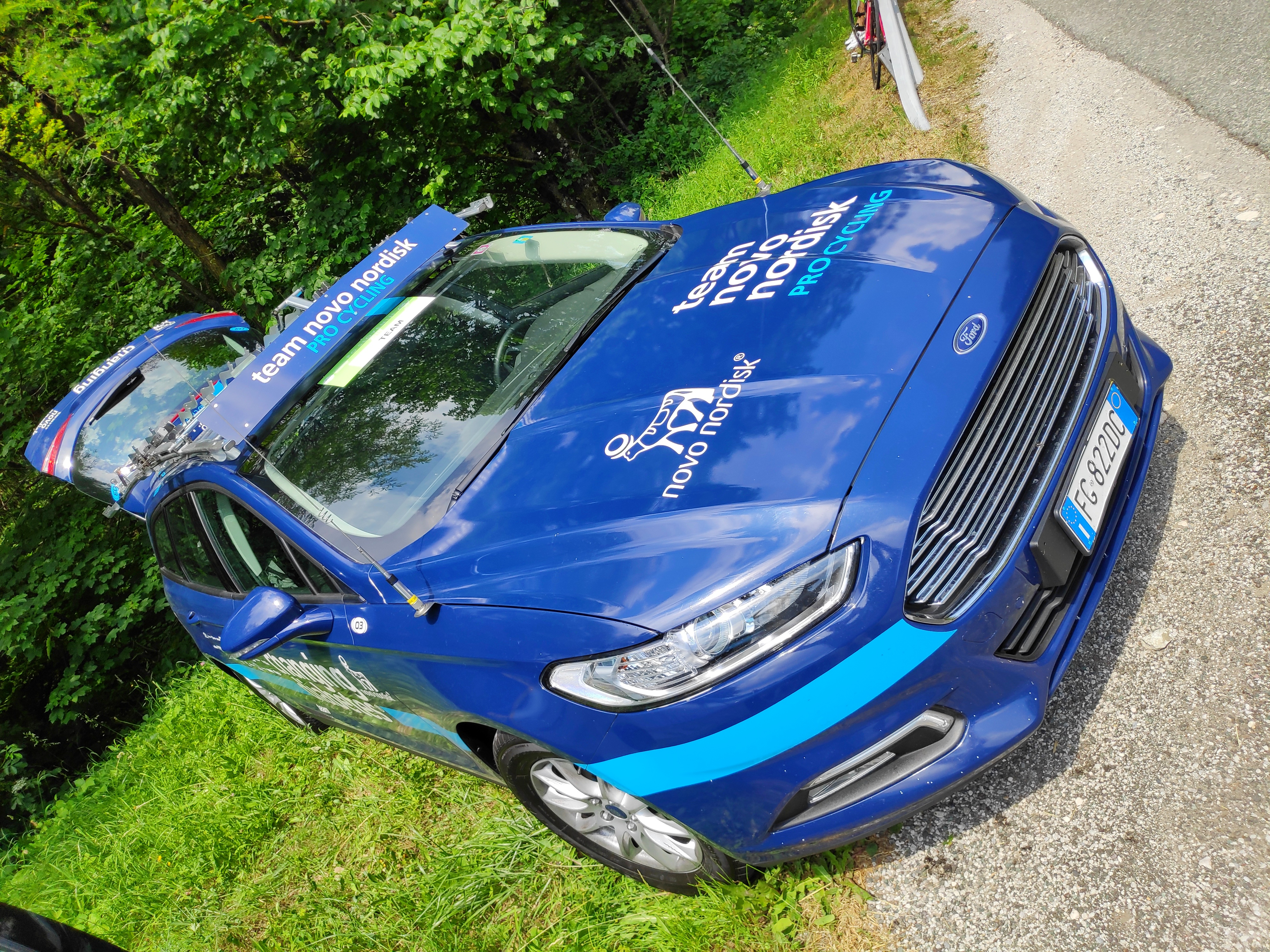
Team support car in 2019 Tour of Slovenia

2005

In 2005, Phil Southerland and Joe Eldridge founded the team, then known as Team Type 1.

2006–07

In 2006, the team was in the 3,000-mile Race Across America to raise diabetes awareness. The team went on to win the event in 2007, 2009 and 2010.

2008

Team Novo Nordisk turned professional in 2008 after success in amateur races. In 2010 it had a UCI Continental licence but became a Professional Continental team in 2011, with a view to competing in the Giro d'Italia in 2011 and the Tour de France in 2012. The team had originally aimed to achieve the Professional Continental level for the 2010 season but decided against applying for an upgraded licence because of fears that it might preclude the team from competing in events outside the responsibility of the International Cycling Union and a lack of knowledge by the team's management of the scale of investment that would be required to compete at the higher level.

2009

In 2009, Team Novo Nordisk won the Race Across America, having entered a team of cyclists who all had type 1 diabetes. The team has also competed in a number of major professional events, such as the Tour of California and the Tour de Langkawi, and picked up two stage wins in the 2010 Tour du Maroc.

2010

Team Novo Nordisk has competed in a number of major professional events, such as the Tour of California and the Tour de Langkawi, and picked up two stage wins in the 2010 Tour du Maroc. In 2010, the team's calendar featured a number of international races, including the Tour de Bretagne Cycliste, the Tour de Taiwan, the Tour of Ireland, and the Tour of Japan. The team's main goal for the 2010 season was the Tour of California, an eight-stage race held in May in which Thomas Rabou won the King of the Mountains competition.

2011–12

Team Novo Nordisk expanded for the 2011 season, their first season as a Professional Continental team, 2013 List of UCI Professional Continental and Continental teams, with signings including former Tour de France yellow jersey-wearer Rubens Bertogliati and Russian Alexander Efimkin, who went on to win the Presidential Cycling Tour of Turkey in May. The team unsuccessfully sought a wildcard entry to the 2011 Giro d'Italia.

2013

In 2013, Team Novo Nordisk became the first-ever professional cycling team to feature an all-diabetes roster. The team continued to race on the International Cycling Union (UCI) Professional Continental tour and competed in major professional races, including the Presidential Cycling Tour of Turkey, Tour de Beauce, Post Danmark Rundt (Tour of Denmark), and USA Pro Cycling Challenge.

2014

In January 2014, the Pro Men's team began its second season as Team Novo Nordisk in Argentina's Tour de San Luis and raced over 150 days throughout the year. The team showed marked improvement in its second season, earning top-ten finishes at the Amgen Tour of California and USA Pro Challenge.

2015

In February 2015, Team Novo Nordisk earned its first-ever win with New Zealander Scott Ambrose taking stage 2 of Le Tour de Filipinas, and the team made its debut at Dubai Tour, earning two top tens at the race.

2021

The team's season is the subject of film director Peter Alsted's documentary, Ride for Your L1fe, available on the Outside network. Ride for Your L1fe follows the Team Novo Nordisk athletes behind the scenes throughout the 2021 season, filming them privately at home and experiencing what a diagnosis has meant to their families and their possibilities with type 1 diabetes.

== Team roster ==
As of January 22, 2024.

Rider	Date of birth
Hamish Beadle (NZL)	April 2, 1998 (age 28)
Sam Brand (GBR)	February 27, 1991 (age 35)
Hamish Armitt (GBR)	June 24, 2002 (age 24)
Lucas Dauge (FRA)	December 28, 1996 (age 29)
Quinten De Graeve (BEL)	January 24, 2000 (age 26)
Jacopo Colladon (ITA)	March 31, 2003 (age 23)
Bailey McDonald (AUS)	May 2, 2003 (age 23)
Declan Irvine (AUS)	March 11, 1999 (age 27)
Matyáš Kopecký (CZE)	January 19, 2003 (age 23)
Anton Muller (FRA)	June 3, 1998 (age 28)

Rider	Date of birth
David Lozano (ESP)	December 21, 1988 (age 37)
Doriand Percrule (FRA)	May 21, 1999 (age 27)
Andrea Peron (ITA)	October 28, 1988 (age 37)
Alessandro Perracchione (ITA)	February 9, 2005 (age 21)
Logan Phippen (USA)	May 10, 1992 (age 34)
Celestin Wattelle (FRA)	October 30, 1993 (age 32)
Antonio Polga (ITA)	March 26, 1999 (age 27)
Umberto Poli (ITA)	August 27, 1996 (age 30)
Filippo Ridolfo (ITA)	November 8, 2001 (age 24)
Nathan Smith (GBR)	August 27, 2000 (age 26)

== Major wins ==
2008
Stage 5 Tour de Taiwan, Shawn Milne
Stage 6 Tour de Beauce, Matthew Wilson
Overall Vuelta Mexico, Glen Chadwick
Stage 2 Fitchburg Longsjo Classic, Ian MacGregor
2009
US Air Force Cycling Classic, Shawn Milne
2010
Stage 1 Vuelta Mexico, Aldo Ino Ilešič
2011
Overall Presidential Cycling Tour of Turkey, Alexander Efimkin
Stage 2 Tour de Beauce, Martijn Verschoor
Overall Tour of Rwanda, Kiel Reijnen

Stages 1, 2, 3 & 5, Kiel Reijnen
Stage 4, Joey Rosskopf

2012
Stage 5 Tour de Korea, Alexander Serebryakov
Philadelphia International Championship, Alexander Serebryakov
Stage 5 Tour de Beauce, Vegard Stake Laengen
Stage 1 Tour of Austria, Alessandro Bazzana
Stage 8 Tour of Austria, Daniele Colli
Stage 7 Tour of Qinghai Lake, Aldo Ino Ilešič
Stages 1 & 3 Tour du Limousin, Jure Kocjan
Stage 4 Tour do Rio, Aldo Ino Ilešič
Stages 2 & 5 Tour of China I, Alexander Serebryakov
Stage 3 Tour of China I, Aldo Ino Ilešič
Stages 1 & 2 Tour of China II, Alexander Serebryakov
Stages 3, 4 & 9 Tour of Hainan, Alexander Serebryakov
Stages 3 & 5 Tour of Taihu Lake, Alexander Serebryakov
2015
Stage 2 Tour de Filipinas, Scott Ambrose
Overall Most Aggressive Rider USA Pro Cycling Challenge, Javier Mejias
2018
Stage 7 Tour of Rwanda, David Lozano
2021
Finland Road Race Championships, Joonas Henttala
2022
GP Kranj, Andrea Peron

== National champions ==
2021
Finnish Road Race Joonas Henttala
