= 2018 Team Sky season =

Team Sky
- UCI code: SKY
- Status: UCI WorldTeam
- World Tour Rank: 2nd
- Manager: Dave Brailsford
- Main sponsor(s): Sky
- Based: National Cycling Centre; Manchester; England
- Bicycles: Pinarello
- Groupset: Shimano

Season victories
- One-day races: 2
- Stage race overall: 10
- Stage race stages: 21
- Grand Tours: 2
- National Championships: 8
- Most wins: Michał Kwiatkowski
- Best ranked rider: Geraint Thomas (4th)

The 2018 cycling season began in Australia at the Tour Down Under for Team Sky in January.

As a UCI WorldTeam, they are automatically invited and obliged to send a squad to every event in the UCI World Tour.

== 2018 roster ==
As of 21 October 2018.

Rider	Date of birth
Leonardo Basso (ITA)	25 December 1993 (aged 24)
Egan Bernal (COL)	13 January 1997 (aged 21)
Jonathan Castroviejo (ESP)	27 April 1987 (aged 31)
David de la Cruz (ESP)	6 May 1989 (aged 29)
Philip Deignan (IRL)	7 September 1983 (aged 35)
Jonathan Dibben (GBR)	12 February 1994 (aged 24)
Mark Donovan (Note: Donovan joined the team on 1 August, as a stagiaire, from Team Wiggins) (GBR)	3 April 1999 (aged 19)
Owain Doull (GBR)	2 May 1993 (aged 25)
Eddie Dunbar (Note: Dunbar joined the team on 15 September, from Aqua Blue Sport) (IRL)	1 September 1996 (aged 22)
Kenny Elissonde (FRA)	22 July 1991 (aged 27)
Chris Froome (GBR)	20 May 1985 (aged 33)
Tao Geoghegan Hart (GBR)	30 March 1995 (aged 23)
Michał Gołaś (POL)	29 April 1984 (aged 34)
Kristoffer Halvorsen (NOR)	13 April 1996 (aged 22)
Ethan Hayter (Note: Hayter joined the team on 1 August, as a stagiaire) (GBR)	18 September 1998 (aged 20)
Sebastián Henao (COL)	5 August 1993 (aged 25)
Sergio Henao (COL)	10 December 1987 (aged 30)

Rider	Date of birth
Beñat Intxausti (ESP)	20 March 1986 (aged 32)
Vasil Kiryienka (BLR)	28 June 1981 (aged 37)
Christian Knees (GER)	5 March 1981 (aged 37)
Michał Kwiatkowski (POL)	2 June 1990 (aged 28)
Chris Lawless (GBR)	4 November 1995 (aged 22)
David López (ESP)	13 May 1981 (aged 37)
Gianni Moscon (ITA)	20 April 1994 (aged 24)
Wout Poels (NED)	1 October 1987 (aged 31)
Salvatore Puccio (ITA)	31 August 1989 (aged 29)
Diego Rosa (ITA)	27 March 1989 (aged 29)
Luke Rowe (GBR)	10 March 1990 (aged 28)
Pavel Sivakov (RUS)	11 July 1997 (aged 21)
Ian Stannard (GBR)	25 May 1987 (aged 31)
Geraint Thomas (GBR)	25 May 1986 (aged 32)
Dylan van Baarle (NED)	21 May 1992 (aged 26)
Łukasz Wiśniowski (POL)	7 December 1991 (aged 26)

Riders who joined the team for the 2018 season

Rider	2017 team
Leonardo Basso	neo-pro (Trek Factory Racing)
Egan Bernal	Androni–Sidermec–Bottecchia
David de la Cruz	Quick-Step Floors
Jonathan Castroviejo	Movistar Team
Pavel Sivakov	BMC Development Team
Kristoffer Halvorsen	Joker Icopal
Chris Lawless	Axeon–Hagens Berman
Dylan van Baarle	Cannondale–Drapac
Eddie Dunbar	Aqua Blue Sport

Riders who left the team during or after the 2017 season

Rider	2018 team
Ian Boswell	Team Katusha–Alpecin
Peter Kennaugh	Bora–Hansgrohe
Mikel Landa	Movistar Team
Mikel Nieve	Mitchelton–Scott
Elia Viviani	Quick-Step Floors
Danny van Poppel	LottoNL–Jumbo

== Season victories ==
Date	Race	Competition	Rider	Country	Location
21 January	Tour Down Under, Young rider classification	UCI World Tour	Egan Bernal (COL)	Australia	
11 February	Colombia Oro y Paz, Overall	UCI America Tour	Egan Bernal (COL)	Colombia	
11 February	Colombia Oro y Paz, Young rider classification	UCI America Tour	Egan Bernal (COL)	Colombia	
11 February	Colombia Oro y Paz, Mountains classification	UCI America Tour	Egan Bernal (COL)	Colombia	
15 February	Volta ao Algarve, Stage 2	UCI Europe Tour	Michał Kwiatkowski (POL)	Portugal	Monchique
15 February	Vuelta a Andalucía, Stage 2	UCI Europe Tour	Wout Poels (NED)	Spain	Alto de Allanadas
16 February	Volta ao Algarve, Stage 3	UCI Europe Tour	Geraint Thomas (GBR)	Portugal	Lagoa
18 February	Vuelta a Andalucía, Stage 4	UCI Europe Tour	David de la Cruz (ESP)	Spain	Barbate
18 February	Vuelta a Andalucía, Points classification	UCI Europe Tour	Wout Poels (NED)	Spain	
18 February	Volta ao Algarve, Stage 5	UCI Europe Tour	Michał Kwiatkowski (POL)	Portugal	Alto do Malhão
18 February	Volta ao Algarve, Overall	UCI Europe Tour	Michał Kwiatkowski (POL)	Portugal	
18 February	Volta ao Algarve, Points classification	UCI Europe Tour	Michał Kwiatkowski (POL)	Portugal	
18 February	Volta ao Algarve, Teams classification	UCI Europe Tour	(Note: The riders on the squad were Owain Doull, Kenny Elissonde, Michał Gołaś, Vasil Kiryienka, Michał Kwiatkowski, Geraint Thomas and Łukasz Wiśniowski)	Portugal	
7 March	Paris–Nice, Stage 4	UCI World Tour	Wout Poels (NED)	France	Saint-Étienne
11 March	Paris–Nice, Stage 8	UCI World Tour	David de la Cruz (ESP)	France	Nice
13 March	Tirreno–Adriatico, Overall	UCI World Tour	Michał Kwiatkowski (POL)	Italy	
22 March	Settimana Coppi e Bartali, Stage 1b	UCI Europe Tour	(Note: The winning riders were Leonardo Basso, Jonathan Dibben, Chris Lawless, Diego Rosa, Luke Rowe and Pavel Sivakov)	Italy	Gatteo
24 March	Settimana Coppi e Bartali, Stage 3	UCI Europe Tour	Chris Lawless (GBR)	Italy	Crevalcore
25 March	Settimana Coppi e Bartali, Overall	UCI Europe Tour	Diego Rosa (ITA)	Italy	
25 March	Settimana Coppi e Bartali, Young Rider Classification	UCI Europe Tour	Pavel Sivakov (RUS)	Italy	
25 March	Settimana Coppi e Bartali, Points Classification	UCI Europe Tour	Chris Lawless (GBR)	Italy	
27 April	Tour de Romandie, Stage 3 (ITT)	UCI World Tour	Egan Bernal (COL)	Switzerland	Villars
29 April	Tour de Romandie, Young Rider Classification	UCI World Tour	Egan Bernal (COL)	Switzerland	
14 May	Tour of California, Stage 2	UCI World Tour	Egan Bernal (COL)	United States	Gibraltar Road
18 May	Tour of California, Stage 6	UCI World Tour	Egan Bernal (COL)	United States	South Lake Tahoe
19 May	Giro d'Italia, Stage 14	UCI World Tour	Chris Froome (GBR)	Italy	Monte Zoncolan
19 May	Tour of California, Overall	UCI World Tour	Egan Bernal (COL)	United States	
19 May	Tour of California, Young Rider Classification	UCI World Tour	Egan Bernal (COL)	United States	
19 May	Tour of California, Teams classification	UCI World Tour	(Note: The riders on the squad were Egan Bernal, Tao Geoghegan Hart, Sebastián Henao, Luke Rowe, Pavel Sivakov, Ian Stannard and Łukasz Wiśniowski)	United States	
25 May	Giro d'Italia, Stage 19	UCI World Tour	Chris Froome (GBR)	Italy	Bardonecchia
27 May	Giro d'Italia, Overall	UCI World Tour	Chris Froome (GBR)	Italy	
27 May	Giro d'Italia, Mountains classification	UCI World Tour	Chris Froome (GBR)	Italy	
27 May	Giro d'Italia, Teams classification	UCI World Tour	(Note: The riders on the squad were Chris Froome, Kenny Elissonde, Wout Poels, Sergio Henao, David de la Cruz, Vasil Kiryienka, Salvatore Puccio and Christian Knees)	Italy	
3 June	Critérium du Dauphiné, Prologue	UCI World Tour	Michał Kwiatkowski (POL)	France	Valence
6 June	Critérium du Dauphiné, Stage 3 (TTT)	UCI World Tour	(Note: The winning riders were Jonathan Castroviejo, Tao Geoghegan Hart, Michał Kwiatkowski, Gianni Moscon, Luke Rowe, Geraint Thomas and Dylan van Baarle)	France	Louhans-Châteaurenaud
10 June	Critérium du Dauphiné, Overall	UCI World Tour	Geraint Thomas (GBR)	France	
10 June	Critérium du Dauphiné, Teams classification	UCI World Tour	(Note: The riders on this squad were Jonathan Castroviejo, Tao Geoghegan Hart, Michał Kwiatkowski, Gianni Moscon, Luke Rowe, Geraint Thomas and Dylan van Baarle)	France	
18 July	Tour de France, Stage 11	UCI World Tour	Geraint Thomas (GBR)	France	La Rosière
19 July	Tour de France, Stage 12	UCI World Tour	Geraint Thomas (GBR)	France	Alpe d'Huez
29 July	Tour de France, Overall	UCI World Tour	Geraint Thomas (GBR)	France	
7 August	Tour de Pologne, Stage 4	UCI World Tour	Michał Kwiatkowski (POL)	Poland	Szczyrk
8 August	Tour de Pologne, Stage 5	UCI World Tour	Michał Kwiatkowski (POL)	Poland	Bielsko-Biała
10 August	Tour de Pologne, Overall	UCI World Tour	Michał Kwiatkowski (POL)	Poland	
10 August	Tour de Pologne, Points classification	UCI World Tour	Michał Kwiatkowski (POL)	Poland	
7 September	Tour of Britain, Stage 6	UCI Europe Tour	Wout Poels (NED)	United Kingdom	Whinlatter
8 September	Tour of Britain, Stage 7	UCI Europe Tour	Ian Stannard (GBR)	United Kingdom	Mansfield
15 September	Coppa Ugo Agostoni	UCI Europe Tour	Gianni Moscon (ITA)	Italy	Lissone
19 September	Giro della Toscana	UCI Europe Tour	Gianni Moscon (ITA)	Italy	Pontedera
19 October	Tour of Guangxi, Stage 4	UCI World Tour	Gianni Moscon (ITA)	China	Mashan Nongla Scenic Spot
21 October	Tour of Guangxi, Overall	UCI World Tour	Gianni Moscon (ITA)	China	
21 October	Tour of Guangxi, Youth classification	UCI World Tour	Gianni Moscon (ITA)	China	

== National, Continental and World champions 2018 ==
Date	Discipline	Jersey	Rider	Country	Location
2 February	Colombian National Time Trial Championships		Egan Bernal (COL)	Colombia	Bogotá
4 February	Colombian National Road Race Championships		Sergio Henao (COL)	Colombia	Bogotá
22 June	Spanish National Time Trial Champion		Jonathan Castroviejo (ESP)	Spain	Castellón
24 June	Polish National Road Race Champion		Michał Kwiatkowski (POL)	Poland	Ostróda
27 June	Dutch National Time Trial Champion		Dylan van Baarle (NED)	Netherlands	Bergen op Zoom
28 June	British National Time Trial Champion		Geraint Thomas (GBR)	United Kingdom	Northumberland
29 June	Belarusian National Time Trial Champion		Vasil Kiryienka (BLR)	Belarus	
4 October	Italian National Time Trial Champion		Gianni Moscon (ITA)	Italy	Cavour
