= Dan Martin (cyclist) =

British-Irish road racing cyclist

Daniel Martin
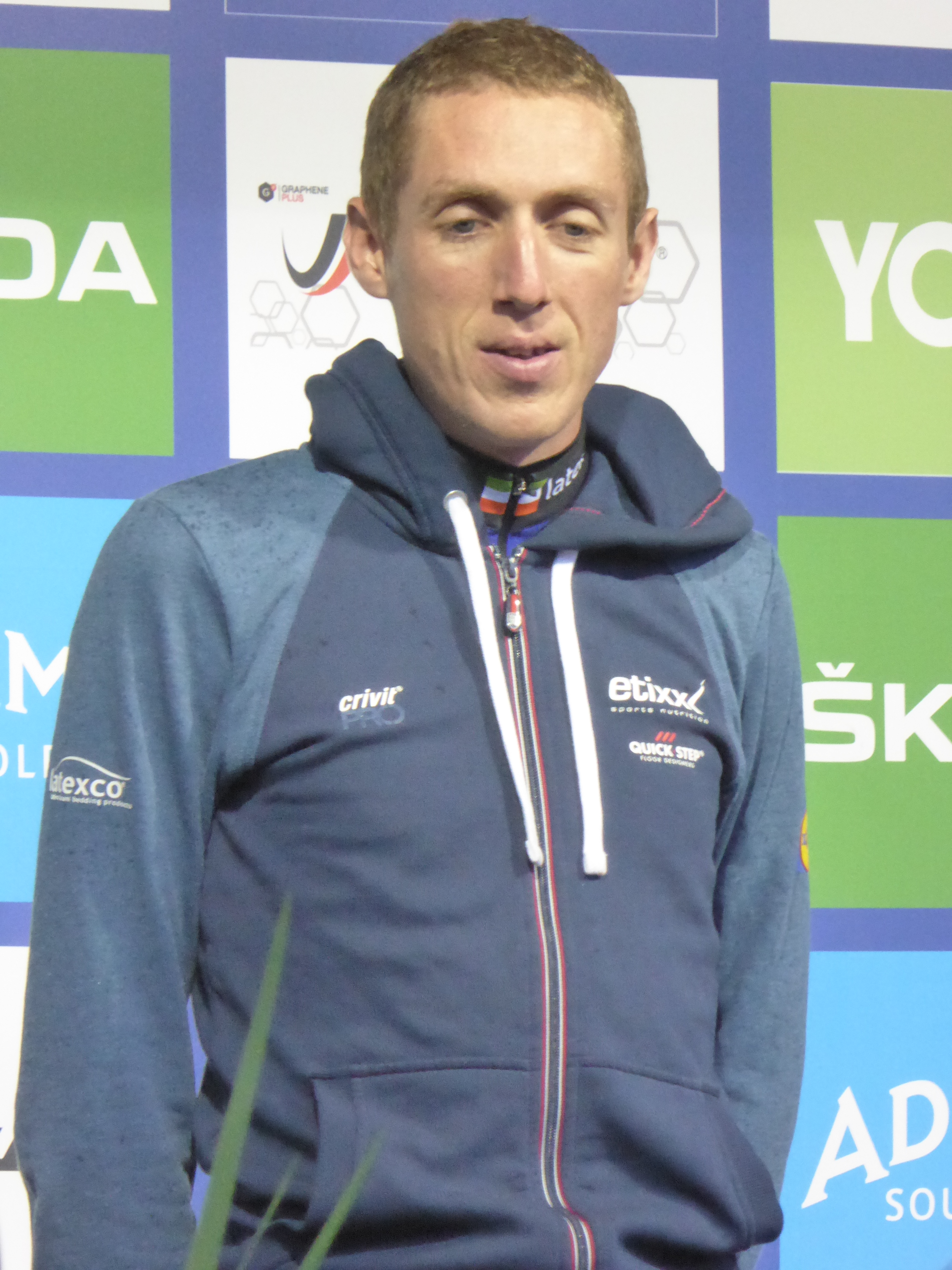
- Martin at the 2016 Tour of Britain

Personal information
- Full name: Daniel John Martin
- Born: 20 August 1986 (age 40) Birmingham, England, United Kingdom
- Height: 1.76 m (5 ft 9 in)
- Weight: 62 kg (137 lb)

Cycling career
- Sport: Cycling
- Current team: Retired
- Discipline: Road
- Role: Rider
- Rider type: Climber; Puncheur

Amateur teams
- 2006–2007: Vélo-Club La Pomme Marseille
- 2007: Slipstream–Chipotle (stagiaire)

Professional teams
- 2008–2015: Slipstream–Chipotle
- 2016–2017: Etixx–Quick-Step
- 2018–2019: UAE Team Emirates
- 2020–2021: Israel Start-Up Nation

Major wins
- Grand Tours Tour de France 2 individual stages (2013, 2018) Combativity award (2018) Giro d'Italia 1 individual stage (2021) Vuelta a España 2 individual stages (2011, 2020) Stage races Volta a Catalunya (2013) Tour de Pologne (2010) One-day races and Classics National Road Race Championships (2008) Liège–Bastogne–Liège (2013) Giro di Lombardia (2014) Tre Valli Varesine (2010) Japan Cup (2010)

Daniel John Martin (born 20 August 1986) is a British-Irish (dual national) former professional road racing cyclist, who rode professionally between 2008 and 2021 for the Cannondale–Garmin, Quick-Step Floors, UAE Team Emirates and Israel Start-Up Nation teams.

Born and raised in England, Martin represented Ireland in competition through his Irish mother. During his career, Martin participated in two Olympic Games and won stages of the 2013 Tour de France and the 2018 Tour de France. Martin also won stages at the Vuelta a España in 2011 and 2020 and the 2021 Giro d'Italia. He finished in the top 10 of six Grand Tours, three times in the Tour de France, twice in the Vuelta a España and once in the Giro d’Italia. He also won the overall classification at the 2010 Tour de Pologne and the 2013 Volta a Catalunya. In one-day races, he won the 2010 Japan Cup, the 2010 Tre Valli Varesine, the 2011 Giro di Toscana and two Monument classics, the 2013 Liège–Bastogne–Liège, and the 2014 Giro di Lombardia.

== Early life and amateur career ==
Martin was born on 20 August 1986 in Birmingham, England, United Kingdom. Martin is the son of Neil Martin, a former British professional cyclist, and Maria Martin (née Roche) from Ireland, the sister of 1987 Triple Crown winner, Stephen Roche, father of professional cyclist Nicolas Roche. He was born five weeks premature and suffered from asthma as a child. Martin grew up in Tamworth, Staffordshire, and was educated at St Francis of Assisi Catholic Technology College. Martin became the British under-18 national road race champion in 2004. However, in 2006, Martin decided to ride for Ireland. In 2005, he joined the French amateur team Vélo-Club La Pomme Marseille, and won the mountains classification in the Ronde de l'Isard.

== Professional career ==
=== Slipstream–Chipotle (2008–15) ===
==== Early years ====
Martin turned professional in 2008 with Slipstream–Chipotle. In 2008, he won the Route du Sud and the Irish National Road Race Championships. In 2009, Martin reached a UCI World Rankings of thirty-fifth (137 points), and rode his first Grand Tour, the 2009 Vuelta a España. In 2010, he won his first UCI ProTour stage race, the Tour of Poland. He finished forty-ninth in the 2010 UCI World Rankings (106 points); Ireland placed seventeenth in the national rankings (254 points).

==== 2011 ====
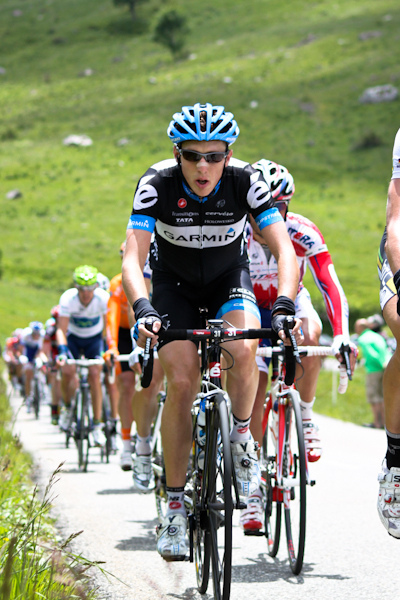
Martin participating in the 2011 Critérium du Dauphiné.

2011 was Martin's break-out season. He won his first Grand Tour stage during the Vuelta a España, and became the first Irishman to hold the mountains classification; he wore the mountains jersey for stages ten and eleven. Martin won Stage 6 and finished second overall, behind Slovak Peter Sagan of Liquigas–Cannondale, in the Tour of Poland. With a second place, behind Leopard Trek's Oliver Zaugg of Switzerland, in the season-ending Giro di Lombardia, Martin finished in ninth in the UCI World Rankings (286 points); Ireland placed thirteenth in the national rankings (319 points).

==== 2012 ====
Whilst achieving no wins in 2012, Martin placed sixteenth in UCI World Ranking (196 points); Ireland finished sixteenth in the national rankings (259 points).

==== 2013 ====
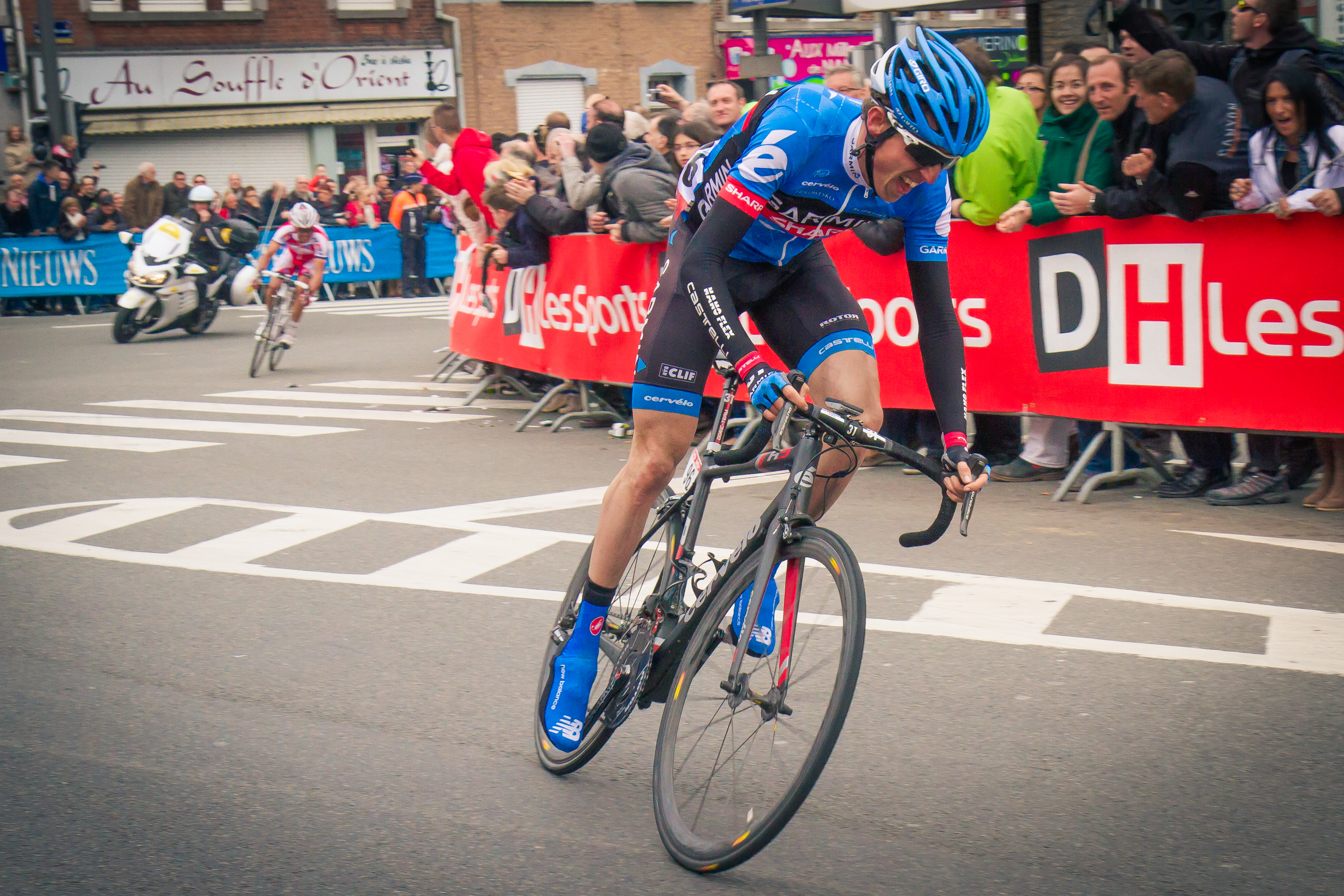
Martin riding to victory at the 2013 Liège–Bastogne–Liège

In March 2013, Martin won Stage 4 of the Volta a Catalunya; his fourth World Tour victory. Martin gained the leader's jersey the following day, and won overall classification four days later. In April, Martin finished fourth in La Flèche Wallonne; the following weekend, he won Liège–Bastogne–Liège, beating Team Katusha's Joaquim Rodríguez of Spain. It was during the final stages of this race that a spectator in a panda suit chased the riders, leading to a long-lasting connection between Martin and the panda. Martin's form continued at the Tour de Suisse where he placed eighth overall.

Martin, along with his teammates Andrew Talansky and Ryder Hesjedal, rode the Tour de France as co-captains. On Stage 8, finishing at Ax 3 Domaines, Talansky and Martin finished together, twelfth and thirtieth, respectively, to sit twelfth and thirteenth overall. The following day, Martin won Stage 9 in Bagnères-de-Bigorre, after escaping from the lead group with Dane Jakob Fuglsang (Astana) on the final climb. He out sprinted Fuglsang in the final kilometre to win the stage. Martin moved up to eighth overall in the process. However, Martin fell ill in the final week, and following the final three mountain stages, slipped to thirty-third overall.

Martin completed the 2013 season with a fourth-place finish in the Giro di Lombardia, and a second-place finish in the Tour of Beijing. Martin finished sixth in the UCI World Rankings (432 points); Ireland placed tenth in the national rankings (568 points).

==== 2014 ====
Martin finished second in La Flèche Wallonne, behind Spaniard Alejandro Valverde (Movistar Team). Martin looked well positioned in Liège–Bastogne–Liège, sitting in second place, but in the final 200 metres (660 feet) he crashed; Australian Simon Gerrans (Orica–GreenEDGE) was victorious. Martin's primary focus was the Giro d'Italia, which started in Belfast. However, in the opening team time trial, Martin crashed, breaking his collarbone; he subsequently abandoned the race. He skipped the Tour de France to focus on the Vuelta a España; he placed seventh overall. In October, Martin won the Giro di Lombardia; he attacked in the final kilometre, and soloed to the finish, winning by one second. Martin won Stage 4, and placed second overall, behind BMC Racing Team's Philippe Gilbert of Belgium, at the season-ending Tour of Beijing. Martin finished ninth in the UCI World Rankings (316 points); Ireland placed fourteenth in the national rankings (357 points).

==== 2015 ====
In March, Martin came in tenth position at the Volta a Catalunya. He participated in Liège–Bastogne–Liège, but was caught in a pile-up and had to abandon all hopes of winning the race. He participated in the Tour de Romandie (finishing 104th) where he complained of chest pain, but only after the race was it found that he had two broken ribs, a result of his crash at Liège–Bastogne–Liège. On Stage 11 of the Tour de France, Martin rode across a three-minute gap on the Col d'Aspin to the breakaway, and then led over the top of the climb. However Rafał Majka, part of the breakaway, attacked the group on the Col du Tourmalet; Martin went over the climb in third place, and he rode with Emanuel Buchmann for a while before going solo to catch Majka. He passed Serge Pauwels but he could not quite get to Majka, but he did win the Combativity award for the stage.

=== Etixx–Quick-Step (2016–17) ===
==== 2016 ====
Martin joined Etixx–Quick-Step on a two-year contract from 2016, with a focus on strengthening the team's squad for the Ardennes classics and competing as a contender in stage races. Martin enjoyed success in his first race with his new team, winning the second stage of the Volta a la Comunitat Valenciana, his first win for over a year. He took another win against a strong field in the Volta a Catalunya, going on to finish third overall. He went on to Belgium to race in the Ardennes classics, where his best result was a third place at La Flèche Wallonne.

==== 2017 ====
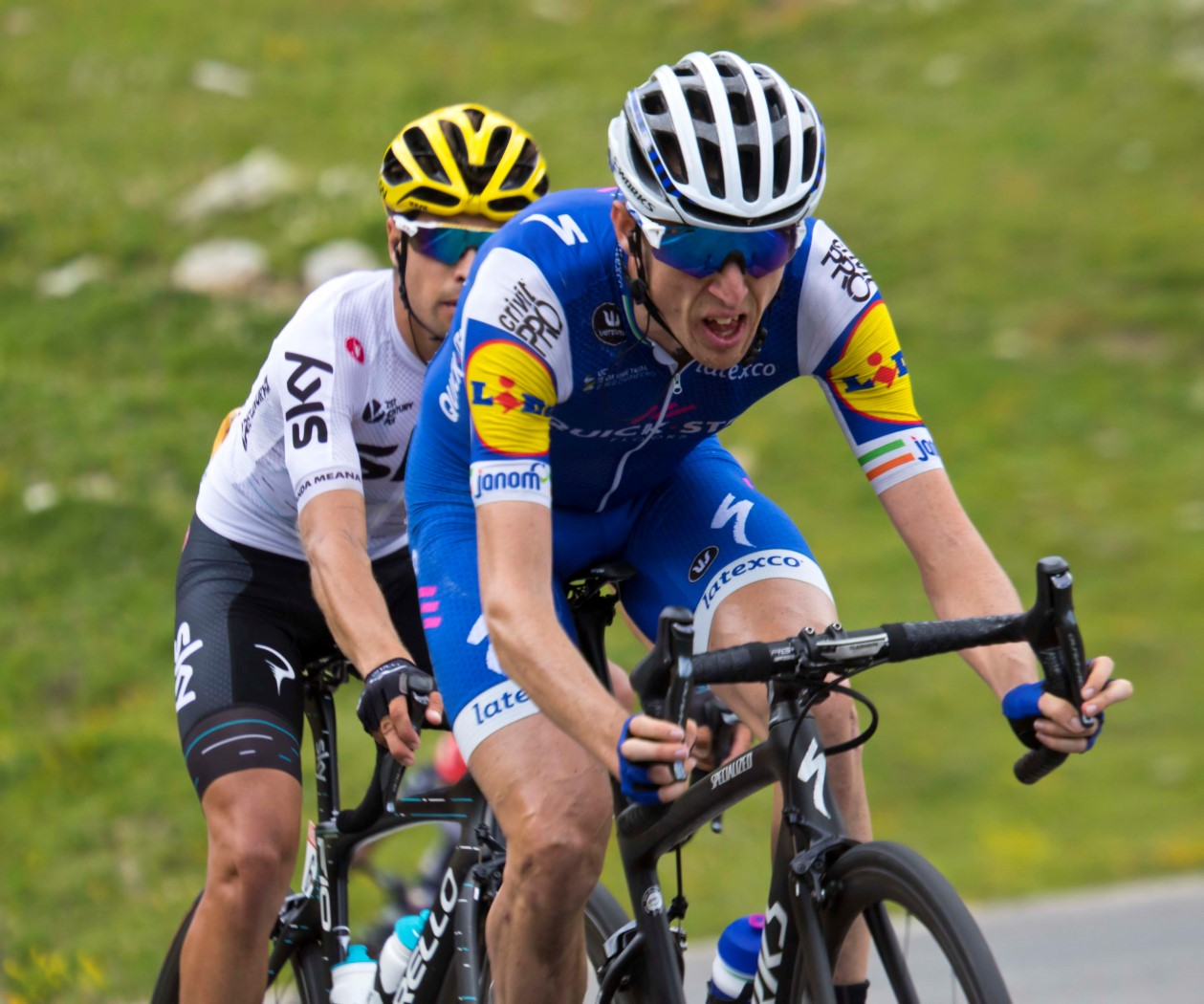
Martin (front) at the 2017 Tour de France

Martin's first significant result of the season was a stage win at the Volta ao Algarve. In April, he placed second to Alejandro Valverde in both La Flèche Wallonne and Liège–Bastogne–Liège. In June, his late attack in the final stage lifted him to the podium, in third place, of the Critérium du Dauphiné, overtaking Chris Froome by a single second.

In the Tour de France, Martin was involved in a crash with Richie Porte in stage 9. In an interview at the end of the stage he said;

I guess the organisers got what they wanted. I don’t think anyone want to takes risks, but it was so slippy out there. Richie just lost it on one corner, locked his back wheel and there was nowhere to go. I was lucky to come away with what I did.

Despite back pain, finding it hard to walk and not being able to get out of his saddle at times, he went on to finish the race sixth in the general classification, only learning afterwards that he had fractured two vertebrae in the crash. The injury forced him to miss the Clásica de San Sebastián.

=== UAE Team Emirates (2018–19) ===
==== 2018 ====
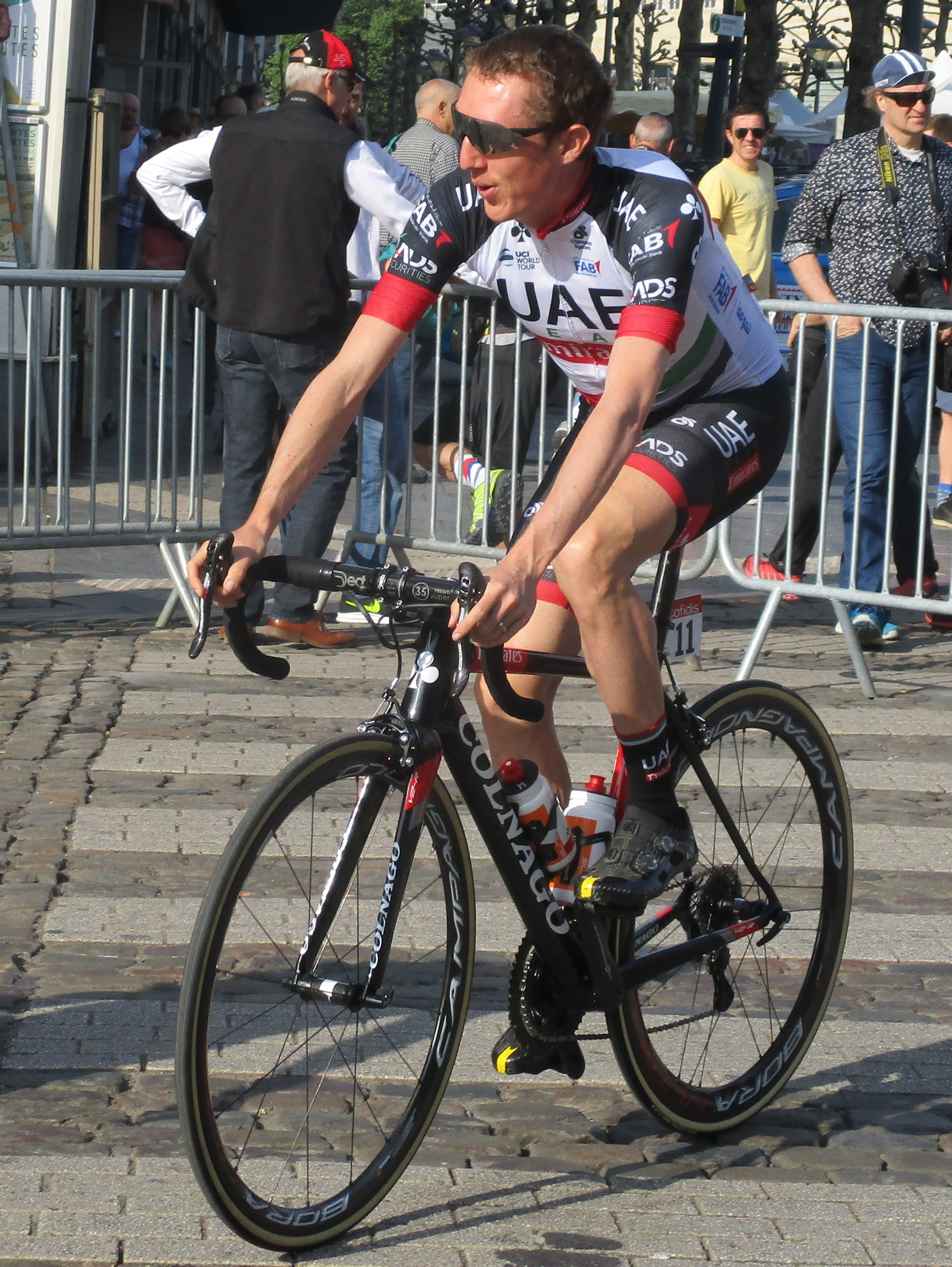
Martin at the 2018 Liège–Bastogne–Liège

In August 2017, Martin announced that he was joining UAE Team Emirates, on a two-year contract, for the 2018 season. Martin had turned down an offer to ride for Team Sky, as he would not be a team leader in Grand Tours. He had also received interest from Bora–Hansgrohe, BMC Racing Team, Team Katusha–Alpecin and Trek–Segafredo. He made his debut for UAE Team Emirates at the Volta ao Algarve. Martin placed fourth on stage 2 of the Volta ao Algarve, by losing out on a sprint finish to Michał Kwiatkowski; he went on to finish 14th overall.

At Paris–Nice, Martin abandoned the race due to bad weather conditions and illness on Stage 7, Martin had lost time on the previous stage due to a mechanical problem with his bike. At the Volta a Catalunya Martin fell behind on Stage 4 to La Molina, finishing 1 minute 29 seconds behind stage winner Alejandro Valverde, in 19th place. He took his first win of the season with a stage win at the Critérium du Dauphiné. On 12 July Martin won his second Tour de France stage, winning stage 6 at Mûr-de-Bretagne. He was named the most combative rider of the Tour de France.

=== Israel Start-Up Nation (2020–21) ===
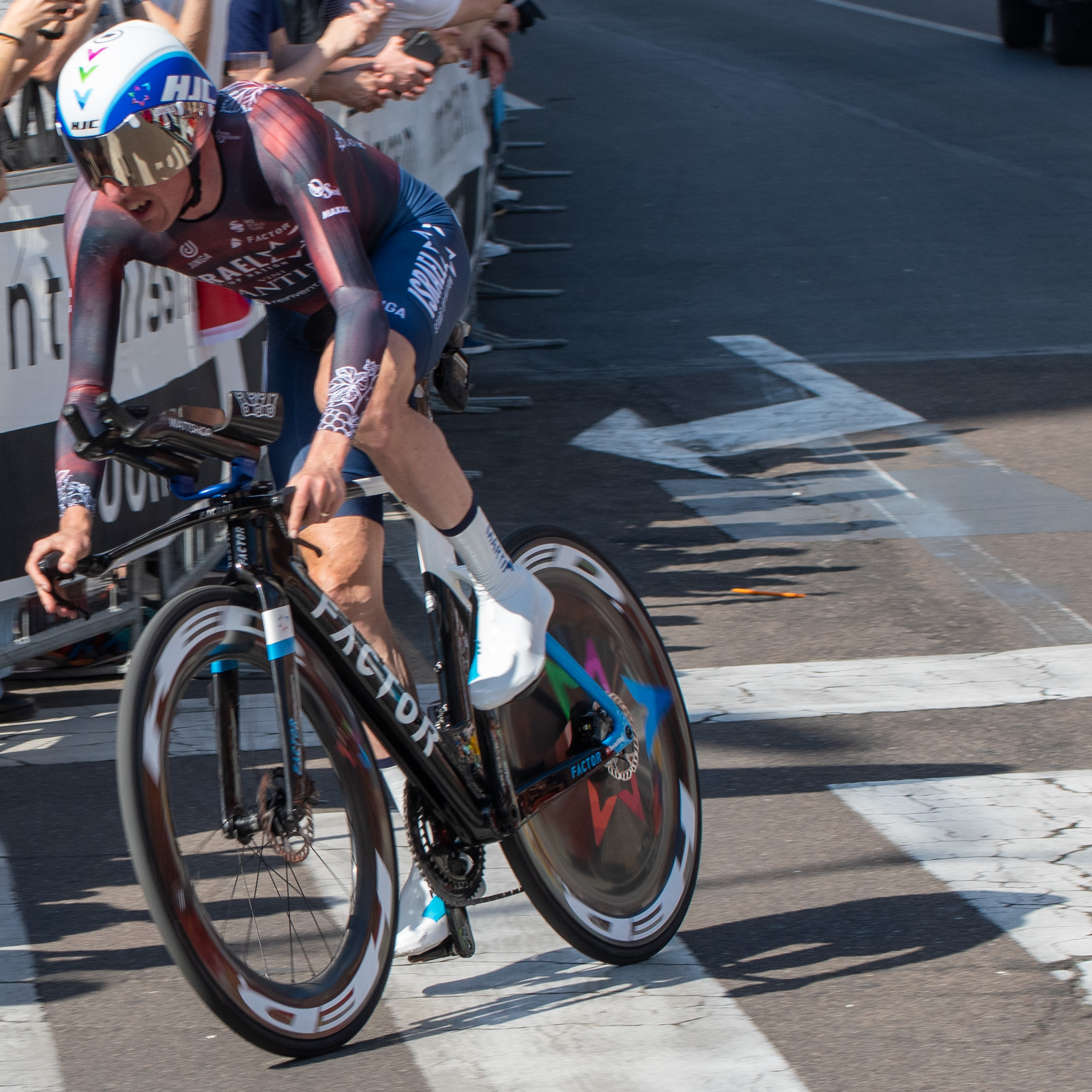
Martin at the 2021 Giro d'Italia

In 2020 Martin joined Israel Start-Up Nation on a two-year contract.

In 2020 Martin took 5th place in La Flèche Wallonne, and in the Vuelta a España he finished third in each of the first two stages, followed by a win on stage three before eventually finishing fourth in the General classification.

On 26 May 2021, he won stage 17 of the 2021 Giro d'Italia, thus claiming a stage win in all three of grand tours. He eventually finished the Giro in 10th Overall. In September 2021, Martin announced that he would retire from competition at the end of the season.

== Personal ==
Martin holds both British and Irish citizenship. After turning professional, Martin resided in Girona, Catalonia, Spain, before moving to Andorra in 2014. He is married to British distance runner Jess Martin. In September 2018 their twin girls, Daisy and Ella Martin, were born.

== Major results ==
2004
1st Road race, British National Junior Road Championships
1st Overall Junior Tour of Wales
2005
9th Overall Ronde de l'Isard
2006
2nd Road race, National Under-23 Road Championships
2nd Overall Giro della Valle d'Aosta

1st Stage 6 (ITT)

6th Trofeo Internazionale Bastianelli
8th Overall Ronde de l'Isard
2007
1st Overall Tour des Pays de Savoie

1st Stage 4

4th Overall Ronde de l'Isard
5th Overall Giro della Valle d'Aosta

1st Points classification
1st Stage 2

9th Trofeo Internazionale Bastianelli
2008 (2 pro wins)
National Road Championships

1st Road race
1st Under-23 road race

1st Overall Route du Sud
4th Overall Tour of Britain
6th Route Adélie de Vitré
8th Overall GP CTT Correios de Portugal
10th Overall Volta a Portugal
2009
2nd Overall Volta a Catalunya
3rd Overall Tour Méditerranéen

1st Young rider classification

5th GP Ouest–France
8th Giro di Lombardia
2010 (4)
1st Overall Tour de Pologne

1st Stage 5

1st Tre Valli Varesine
1st Japan Cup
Tour Series Ireland, Dublin

1st Criterium
1st Sprints

2nd Giro dell'Emilia
3rd Overall Brixia Tour
3rd Road race, National Road Championships
2011 (3)
1st Giro di Toscana
1st Stage 9 Vuelta a España
2nd Road race, National Road Championships
2nd Overall Volta a Catalunya
2nd Overall Tour de Pologne

1st Stage 6

2nd Giro di Lombardia
3rd Memorial Marco Pantani
8th UCI World Tour
2012
2nd Japan Cup
4th Overall Tour of Beijing

1st Mountains classification

4th Overall Volta a Catalunya
5th Liège–Bastogne–Liège
6th La Flèche Wallonne
2013 (4)
1st Overall Volta a Catalunya

1st Stage 4

1st Liège–Bastogne–Liège
1st Stage 9 Tour de France
2nd Overall Tour of Beijing
4th Giro di Lombardia
4th La Flèche Wallonne
6th UCI World Tour
8th Overall Tour de Suisse
2014 (2)
1st Giro di Lombardia
2nd Overall Tour of Beijing

1st Stage 4

2nd La Flèche Wallonne
3rd Overall Tour de l'Ain
7th Overall Vuelta a España
9th UCI World Tour
2015
7th Overall Critérium du Dauphiné
7th Clásica de San Sebastián
10th Overall Volta a Catalunya
2016 (2)
1st Stage 2 Volta a la Comunitat Valenciana
3rd Overall Volta a Catalunya

1st Stage 3

3rd Overall Critérium du Dauphiné
3rd La Flèche Wallonne
9th Overall Tour de France
10th UCI World Tour
2017 (1)
2nd Liège–Bastogne–Liège
2nd La Flèche Wallonne
3rd Overall Paris–Nice
3rd Overall Critérium du Dauphiné
5th Overall Volta a la Comunitat Valenciana
6th Overall Tour de France
6th Overall Volta ao Algarve

1st Stage 2

6th Overall Volta a Catalunya
8th UCI World Tour
2018 (2)
4th Overall Critérium du Dauphiné

1st Stage 5

8th Overall Tour de France

1st Stage 6
Combativity award Overall

9th Giro di Lombardia
10th Overall Tour de Romandie
2019
2nd Overall Tour of the Basque Country
4th Overall Volta a la Comunitat Valenciana
5th Gran Piemonte
7th Overall UAE Tour
8th Overall Critérium du Dauphiné
2020 (1)
4th Overall Vuelta a España

1st Stage 3

4th Overall Volta a la Comunitat Valenciana
5th La Flèche Wallonne
2021 (1)
6th Giro dell'Emilia
7th Overall Tour of Britain
10th Overall Giro d'Italia

1st Stage 17

=== General classification results timeline ===
Grand Tour general classification results timeline
Grand Tour	2008	2009	2010	2011	2012	2013	2014	2015	2016	2017	2018	2019	2020	2021
Giro d'Italia	—	—	57	—	—	—	DNF	—	—	—	—	—	—	10
Tour de France	—	—	—	—	35	33	—	39	9	6	8	18	41	40
/ Vuelta a España	—	53	—	13	—	DNF	7	DNF	—	—	DNF	—	4	—
Major stage race general classification results
Race	2008	2009	2010	2011	2012	2013	2014	2015	2016	2017	2018	2019	2020	2021
Paris–Nice	—	DNF	69	—	—	—	—	—	—	3	DNF	—	—	—
Tirreno–Adriatico	—	—	—	—	—	20	55	25	—	—	—	—	—	—
Volta a Catalunya	24	2	—	2	4	1	16	10	3	6	38	23	NH	25
Tour of the Basque Country	—	—	14	DNF	DNF	—	—	—	DNF	—	—	2	NH	—
Tour de Romandie	—	58	—	—	14	—	—	104	—	—	10	—	NH	—
Critérium du Dauphiné	—	32	—	33	106	—	—	7	3	3	4	8	DNF	—
Tour de Suisse	—	—	—	—	—	8	—	—	—	—	—	—	NH	—

=== Classics results timeline ===
Monument	2008	2009	2010	2011	2012	2013	2014	2015	2016	2017	2018	2019	2020	2021
Milan–San Remo	Did not contest during his career													
Tour of Flanders	Did not contest during his career													
Paris–Roubaix	Did not contest during his career													
Liège–Bastogne–Liège	118	99	58	DNF	5	1	39	DNF	47	2	18	DNF	11	—
Giro di Lombardia	DNF	8	DNF	2	16	4	1	52	48	36	9	18	—	38
Classic	2008	2009	2010	2011	2012	2013	2014	2015	2016	2017	2018	2019	2020	2021
Amstel Gold Race	—	DNF	—	—	75	DNF	DNF	15	—	DNF	DNF	—	NH	—
La Flèche Wallonne	—	56	17	DNF	6	4	2	DNF	3	2	61	DNF	5	—
Clásica de San Sebastián	—	—	—	—	18	—	25	7	12	—	12	32	NH	—
GP Ouest–France	—	5	64	—	81	—	—	—	—	—	—	—	—	40
Tre Valli Varesine	—	—	1	—	—	—	—	—	—	—	—	61	—	—
Giro del Piemonte	143	DNF	DNF	DNF	—	—	—	—	—	—	—	5	—	—
Giro dell'Emilia	—	—	2	21	—	—	—	—	—	—	—	18	—	6

Legend
—	Did not compete
DNF	Did not finish
NH	Not held
