= 2019 Gran Piemonte =

2019 UCI Europe Tour

Race details
- Dates: 10 October
- Stages: 1
- Distance: 183 km (113.7 mi)
- Winning time: 4h 24' 16"

Results
	Winner	Egan Bernal (COL)	(Team Ineos)
	Second	Iván Sosa (COL)	(Team Ineos)
	Third	Nans Peters (FRA)	(AG2R La Mondiale)

The 2019 Gran Piemonte was the 103rd edition of the Gran Piemonte (known as Giro del Piemonte until 2009) single-day cycling race. It was held on 10 October, over a distance of 183 km, starting in Agliè and ending in the Sanctuary of Oropa.

The race was won by Egan Bernal of Team Ineos.

== Teams ==
Nineteen teams were invited to take part in the race. These included ten UCI WorldTeams and nine UCI Professional Continental.

UCI WorldTeams

- AG2R La Mondiale
- Astana
- Bora–Hansgrohe
- Bahrain–Merida
- EF Education First
- Team Dimension Data
- Movistar Team
- Team Katusha–Alpecin
- UAE Team Emirates
- Team Ineos

UCI Professional Continental Teams

- Corendon–Circus
- Androni Giocattoli–Sidermec
- Bardiani–CSF
- Cofidis
- Gazprom–RusVelo
- Wanty–Gobert
- Neri Sottoli–Selle Italia–KTM
- Nippo–Vini Fantini–Faizanè
- Vital Concept–B&B Hotels

== Results ==
Result
Rank	Rider	Team	Time
1	Egan Bernal (COL)	Team Ineos	4h 20' 50"
2	Iván Sosa (COL)	Team Ineos	+ 6"
3	Nans Peters (FRA)	AG2R La Mondiale	+ 8"
4	Emanuel Buchmann (GER)	Bora–Hansgrohe	+ 10"
5	Dan Martin (IRL)	UAE Team Emirates	+ 11"
6	Mathias Frank (SUI)	AG2R La Mondiale	+ 40"
7	Davide Villella (ITA)	Astana	+ 46"
8	Giovanni Visconti (ITA)	Neri Sottoli–Selle Italia–KTM	+ 47"
9	Clément Champoussin (FRA)	AG2R La Mondiale	+ 47"
10	Carlos Verona (ESP)	Movistar Team	+ 49"
