= Emanuel Buchmann =

German cyclist (born 1992)

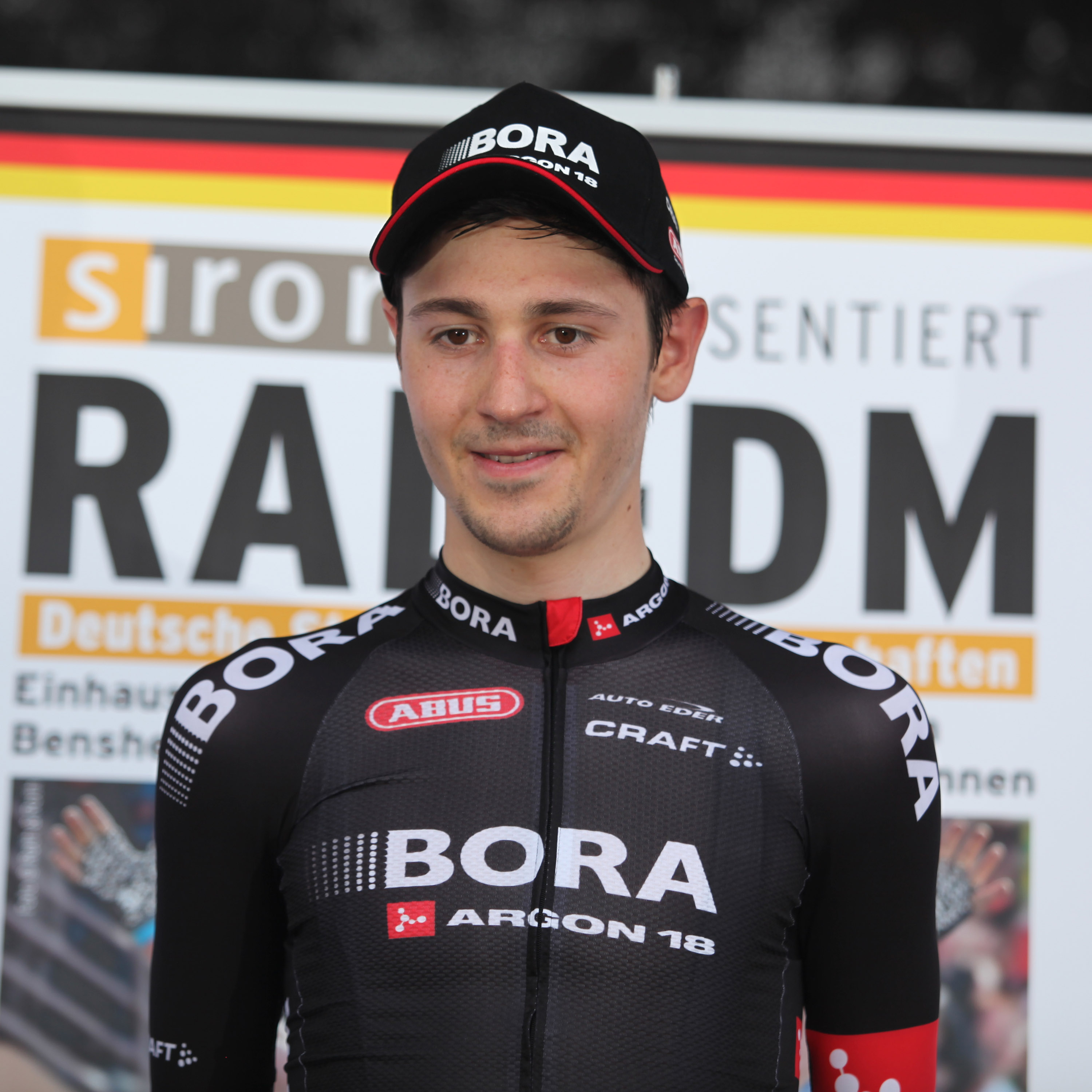
- Buchmann in 2015

Personal information
- Full name: Emanuel Buchmann
- Born: 18 November 1992 (age 33) Ravensburg, Baden-Württemberg, Germany
- Height: 1.80 m (5 ft 11 in)
- Weight: 59 kg (130 lb)

Cycling career
- Sport: Cycling
- Current team: Cofidis
- Discipline: Road
- Role: Rider
- Rider type: Climber

Professional teams
- 2012–2013: Team Specialized Concept Store
- 2014: Rad-Net Rose Team
- 2015–2024: Bora–Argon 18
- 2025–: Cofidis

Major wins
- One-day races and Classics National Road Race Championships (2015, 2023)

Emanuel Buchmann (born 18 November 1992) is a German professional racing cyclist, who rides for UCI WorldTeam Cofidis. He is a two-time winner of the German National Road Race Championships, in 2015 and 2023. He has competed in twelve Grand Tours, with a best result of fourth place, recorded at the 2019 Tour de France.

== Career ==
Buchmann is the son of carpenter Manfred Buchmann and hails from Vogt near Ravensburg in the German state of Baden-Württemberg. As of 2020, he lives in Bregenz, Austria.

=== Bora–Argon 18 (2015–present) ===
==== 2015–2016 ====
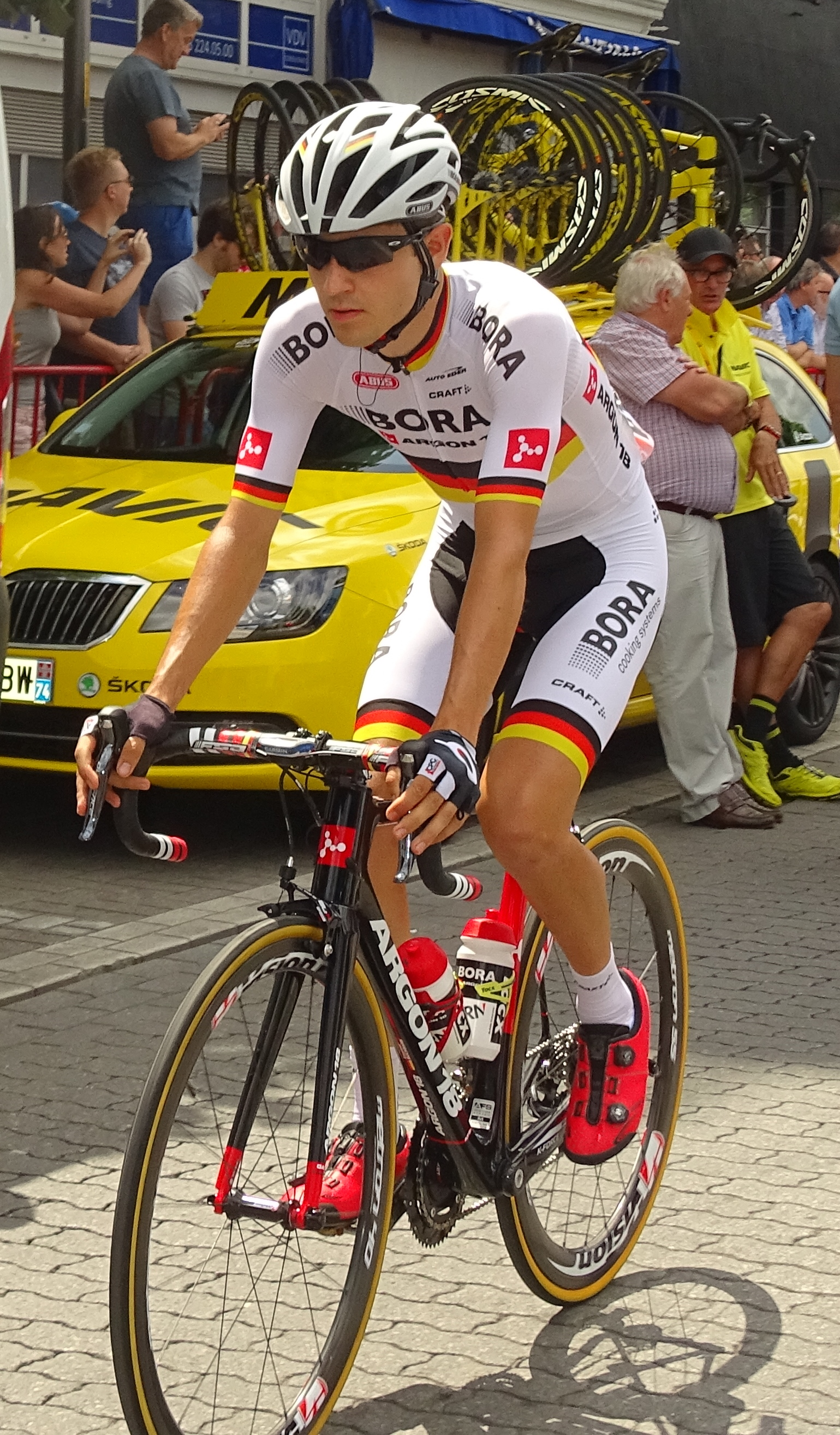
Buchmann at the 2015 Tour de France

In 2015, Buchmann denied the strong sprinters their chance at the German National Road Race Championships when he attacked from a leading group to take the title. During the subsequent Tour de France, he finished a strong third on the stage finishing at the top of the Col du Tourmalet. During the following season, Buchmann finished third in the young rider classification at the Tour de France, and recorded top-ten finishes at Rad am Ring (fourth) and the Giro del Trentino (eighth).

==== 2017 ====
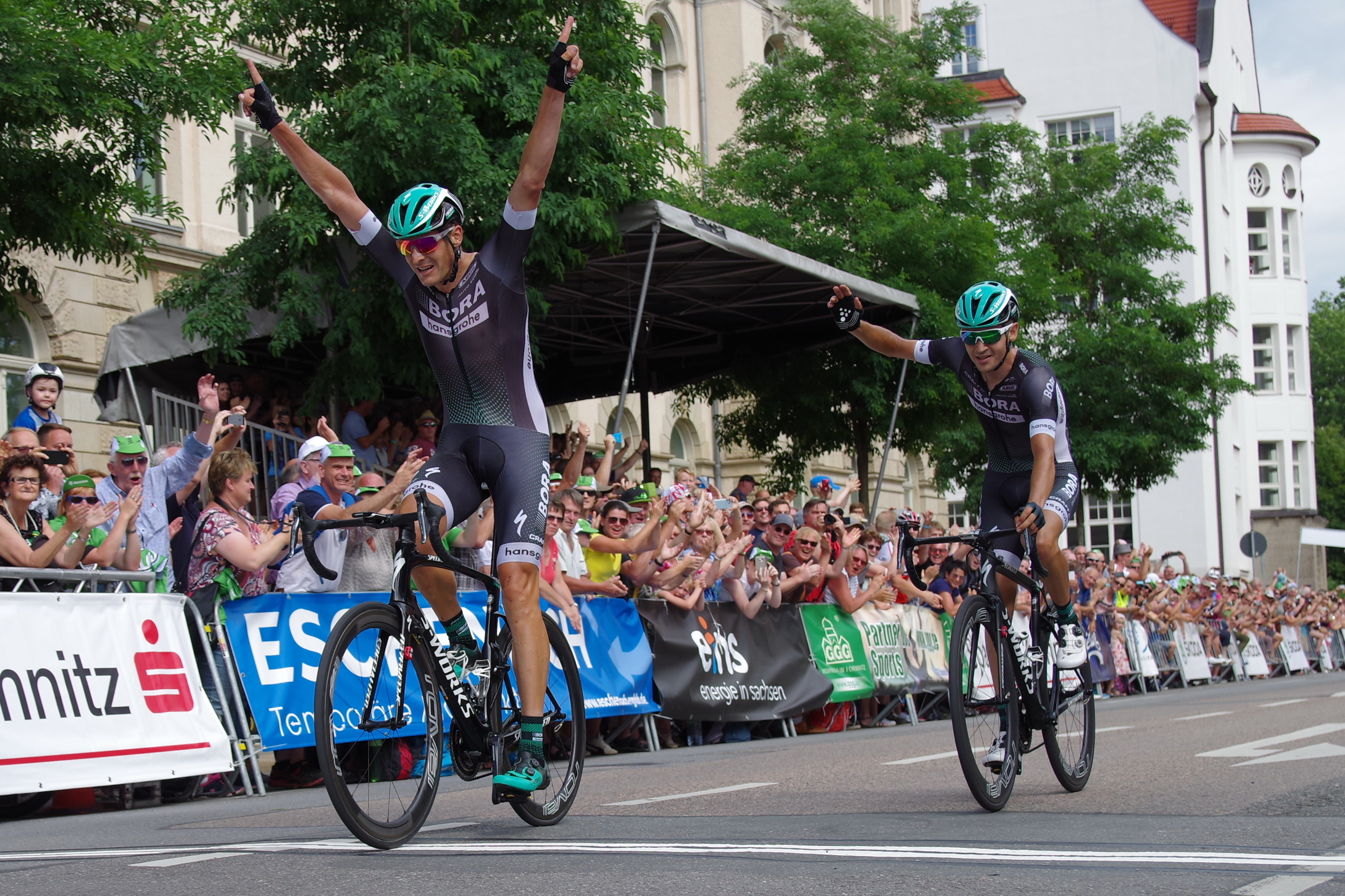
Buchmann (right) finishing second behind teammate Marcus Burghardt at the 2017 German National Road Race Championships

After a quieter 2016 season, he finished tenth at the 2017 Tour de Romandie, losing a podium position only during the race's final stage time trial. Buchmann then finished seventh overall and first in the young riders' classification at the Critérium du Dauphiné, one of the major preparation races for the Tour de France. During the last stage, he finished ahead of strong general classification riders such as Chris Froome, Alejandro Valverde and Alberto Contador at Plateau de Solaison. Buchmann commented after the stage that he was delighted to have been able to "stay with the best" of the race. At the German National Road Race Championships the week after, Buchmann set up the victory for his teammate Marcus Burghardt, finishing in second place. His form faded slightly at the Tour de France, where he was set to work for team leader Rafał Majka, who withdrew early; he eventually finished in 15th place overall.

==== 2018 ====
Buchmann opened the season strongly, with a 10th place overall at the Abu Dhabi Tour. He followed that up with his best result, at that time, 4th at the Tour of the Basque Country. He finished 9th at the Tour de Romandie, and 18th at the Eschborn–Frankfurt race. At the Critérium du Dauphiné in June, Buchmann finished sixth in the general classification, repeating his strong performance from the previous year. He attacked multiple times on the final stage, but was brought back and finished the stage fourth. He was selected to ride the Vuelta a España. He performed well in the opening stages. On stage 4, he attacked the group of favourites on the finishing climb of Alfacar, gaining time which moved him into second place overall, within seven seconds of the race lead. After falling back during the subsequent mountain stages, Buchmann eventually finished the Vuelta in 12th place overall, his best result in a Grand Tour up to that point.

==== 2019 ====
Buchmann raced the Tour of the Basque Country, winning stage 5 after attacking on the penultimate climb of the day to take the overall lead. He lost the leader's jersey on the final stage of the race. In the closing metres, Buchmann took a wrong turn and lost significant time. The time he lost through this was later reinstated, meaning that he finished the race in third overall. At the Tour de Romandie, Buchmann finished seventh overall.

In preparation for the upcoming Tour de France, Buchmann raced the Critérium du Dauphiné, where he finished third overall, after Adam Yates abandoned the event during the final stage, handing the podium spot to Buchmann. He remained in good form all the way through the Tour de France, answering nearly every attack by the elite general classification riders. By the time the race reached the Champs-Élysées, he was barely two minutes behind race leader Egan Bernal, just off the podium in fourth place.

==== 2020 ====
Buchmann started his 2020 season strongly, winning the Trofeo de Tramuntana, the second leg of the Challenge Mallorca. He was part of a breakaway that formed on the penultimate climb of the day and used the descent to create a gap, which he held to the finish. His last race before the season was interrupted by the COVID-19 pandemic was the UAE Tour, which he was forced to abandon after a crash. His next objectives after racing resumed were the Critérium du Dauphiné before leading his team at the Tour de France. At the Dauphiné, Buchmann was third overall when a crash on stage four forced him to withdraw. The injuries he sustained put his Tour de France participation in doubt, but he eventually started the race, finishing 38th overall.

==== 2021 ====
For 2021, Buchmann initially chose to forgo the Tour de France, due to its route not suiting his strengths, containing too many time trials and too little mountain-top finishes. He decided to compete at the Giro d'Italia instead. Following a poor opening time trial and losing some seconds during the first mountain stages, Buchmann came into his own on stage 11 over gravel roads, launching an attack that only Egan Bernal was able to follow, elevating himself into sixth place in the process. He rode strongly on stage 14 as well, ending on the Monte Zoncolan, keeping his overall position. However, a mass crash early during stage 15 saw Buchmann fall. While he was able to stand afterwards, the race doctor made the decision to pull Buchmann from the race. He was brought to hospital, where a light concussion and bruises to the face and hip were diagnosed. In June, Buchmann was added to Bora–Hansgrohe's Tour de France squad, riding in support of team leader Wilco Kelderman.

==== 2022–2023 ====
In 2022, Buchmann's best finish of the season was a fourth-place result at the German National Road Race Championships, finishing nearly three minutes down on his teammate Nils Politt. He also finished in the top ten placings at the Giro d'Italia, with a seventh-place overall finish in support of teammate Jai Hindley, who won the race.

The following year, Buchmann won his second German National Road Race Championships title, winning the race in Bad Dürrheim following a 70-kilometre (43-mile) solo escape.

== Major results ==
2010
9th Ronde van Vlaanderen Junioren
10th Overall Tour du Valromey
2012
6th Overall Tour d'Azerbaïdjan
2014
3rd Overall Okolo Jižních Čech

1st Stage 3

7th Overall Tour de l'Avenir
7th GP Capodarco
8th Overall Tour d'Azerbaïdjan
8th Overall Mzansi Tour
2015 (1 pro win)
1st Road race, National Road Championships
1st Stage 1 (TTT) Giro del Trentino
2016
4th Rudi Altig Race
8th Overall Giro del Trentino
2017
2nd Road race, National Road Championships
6th Trofeo Serra de Tramuntana
7th Overall Critérium du Dauphiné

1st Young rider classification

7th Overall Tour of the Alps
10th Overall Tour de Romandie
10th Vuelta a Murcia
2018
4th Overall Tour of the Basque Country
6th Overall Critérium du Dauphiné
7th Overall Tour de Pologne
9th Overall Tour de Romandie
10th Overall Abu Dhabi Tour
2019 (2)
1st Trofeo Andratx–Lloseta
2nd Trofeo Serra de Tramuntana
3rd Overall Tour of the Basque Country

1st Stage 5

3rd Overall Critérium du Dauphiné
4th Overall Tour de France
4th Overall UAE Tour
4th Gran Piemonte
7th Overall Tour de Romandie
8th Giro di Lombardia
2020 (1)
1st Trofeo Serra de Tramuntana
9th Pollença–Andratx
2021
4th Road race, National Road Championships
2022
4th Road race, National Road Championships
5th Circuito de Getxo
6th Trofeo Serra de Tramuntana
7th Overall Giro d'Italia
9th Trofeo Calvià
2023 (1)
1st Road race, National Road Championships
9th Overall UAE Tour
10th Trofeo Andratx–Mirador D'es Colomer
2024
2nd Overall Tour de Hongrie

=== General classification results timeline ===
Grand Tour general classification results
Grand Tour	2015	2016	2017	2018	2019	2020	2021	2022	2023
Giro d'Italia	—	—	—	—	—	—	DNF	7	—
Tour de France	83	21	15	—	4	38	33	—	21
Vuelta a España	—	—	65	12	—	—	—	—	20
Major stage race general classification results
Race	2015	2016	2017	2018	2019	2020	2021	2022	2023
Paris–Nice	—	—	DNF	—	—	—	—	—	—
Tirreno–Adriatico	—	66	—	—	—	—	—	28	—
Volta a Catalunya	Has not contested during his career								
Tour of the Basque Country	—	—	13	4	3	NH	13	DNF	19
Tour de Romandie	—	—	10	9	7	NH	—	—	—
Critérium du Dauphiné	32	20	7	6	3	DNF	—	—	19
Tour de Suisse	—	—	—	—	—	NH	—	—	—

Legend
—	Did not compete
DNF	Did not finish
NH	Not held
