= Gianni Savio =

Italian cycling team manager (1948–2024)

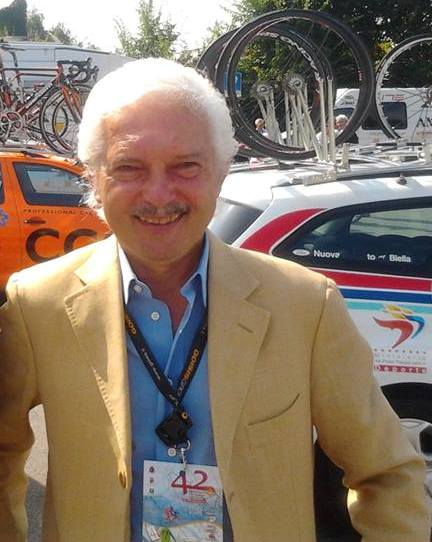
- At 2013 Settimana Ciclistica Lombarda

Personal information
- Full name: Giovanni Savio
- Born: 16 April 1948 Turin, Italy
- Died: 30 December 2024 (aged 76) Turin, Italy

Cycling career
- Sport: Cycling
- Discipline: Road
- Role: Directeur sportif

Managerial teams
- 1992–1995: ZG Mobili–Selle Italia
- 1996–2023: Glacial–Selle Italia

Gianni Savio (16 April 1948 – 30 December 2024) was an Italian cycling team manager, who was a directeur sportif with the GW Erco SportFitness cycling team, a position he held since the team's creation in 1996.

== Career ==
Savio began his career as a sports director in 1986 with Santini. Later in 1992, he took over the direction of ZG Mobili–Selle Italia from Dino Zandegù. He then joined the newly created Glacial–Selle Italia in 1996 which underwent several changes in sponsorship and names over the years, including Selle Italia, Colombia-Selle Italia, Serramenti PVC Diquigiovanni and Androni Giocattoli, reaching the current GW Shimano–Sidermec.

In his thirty-year career, he has directed riders such as Andrea Tafi (turned professional in late 1988), Nelson Rodríguez, Leonardo Sierra, Andrea Ferrigato, Romāns Vainšteins, Freddy González, Carlos Alberto Contreras, José Rujano, Iván Parra, José Serpa, Michele Scarponi, Jackson Rodríguez, Franco Pellizotti, Fausto Masnada, Egan Bernal, Iván Ramiro Sosa, and Mattia Cattaneo.

A great connoisseur of the South American cycling movement, he has built relationships over the years with various sports ministries, allowing him to secure sponsorships and the role of coach for the Colombian and later Venezuelan national teams. Under Savio's leadership, Colombia achieved its only world title, the victory of Santiago Botero in the 2002 UCI Road World Championships – Men's time trial.

== Death ==
Savio died after a long illness in Turin, on 30 December 2024, at the age of 76.
