= 2021 Strade Bianche =

2021 UCI World Tour, race 3 of 29
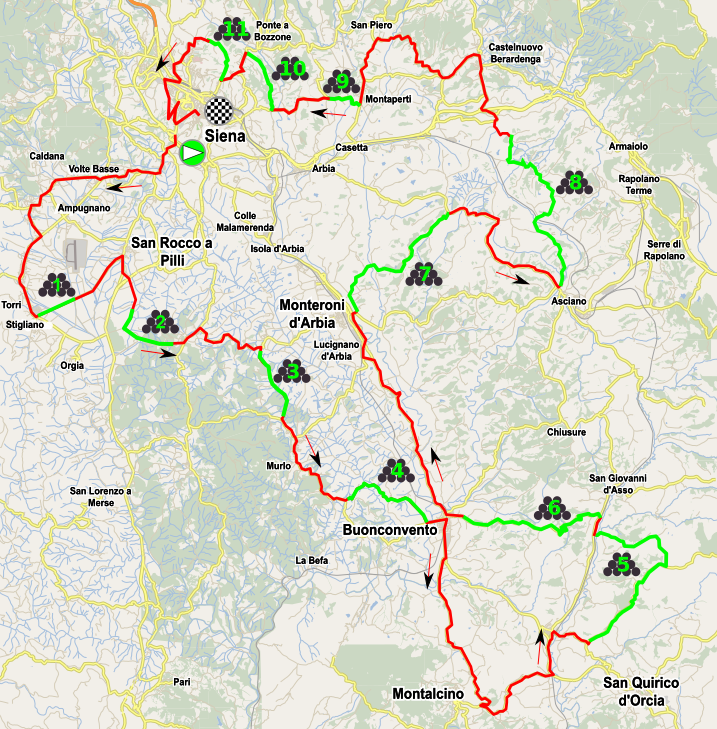

Race details
- Dates: 6 March 2021
- Stages: 1
- Distance: 184 km (114.3 mi)
- Winning time: 4h 40' 29"

Results
	Winner	Mathieu van der Poel (NED)	(Alpecin–Fenix)
	Second	Julian Alaphilippe (FRA)	(Deceuninck–Quick-Step)
	Third	Egan Bernal (COL)	(Ineos Grenadiers)

The 15th edition of the Strade Bianche was held on 6 March 2021. Starting and finishing in Siena, Tuscany, Italy, it was the third event of the 2021 UCI World Tour.

== Teams ==
Twenty-five teams participated in the race, including all nineteen UCI WorldTeams and six UCI ProTeams. Each team entered seven riders, for a total of 175 riders. Of these riders, 118 finished, while a further 20 riders finished over the time limit.

UCI WorldTeams

- AG2R Citroën Team
- Astana–Premier Tech
- Bora–Hansgrohe
- Cofidis
- Deceuninck–Quick-Step
- EF Education–Nippo
- Groupama–FDJ
- Ineos Grenadiers
- Intermarché–Wanty–Gobert Matériaux
- Israel Start-Up Nation
- Lotto–Soudal
- Movistar Team
- Team Bahrain Victorious
- Team BikeExchange
- Team DSM
- Team Jumbo–Visma
- Team Qhubeka Assos
- Trek–Segafredo
- UAE Team Emirates

UCI ProTeams

- Alpecin–Fenix
- Androni Giocattoli–Sidermec
- Arkéa–Samsic
- Bardiani–CSF–Faizanè
- Eolo–Kometa
- Vini Zabù

== Result ==
Result
Rank	Rider	Team	Time
1	Mathieu van der Poel (NED)	Alpecin–Fenix	4h 40' 29"
2	Julian Alaphilippe (FRA)	Deceuninck–Quick-Step	+ 5"
3	Egan Bernal (COL)	Ineos Grenadiers	+ 20"
4	Wout van Aert (BEL)	Team Jumbo–Visma	+ 51"
5	Tom Pidcock (GBR)	Ineos Grenadiers	+ 54"
6	Michael Gogl (AUT)	Team Qhubeka Assos	+ 54"
7	Tadej Pogačar (SLO)	UAE Team Emirates	+ 54"
8	Simon Clarke (AUS)	Team Qhubeka Assos	+ 2' 25"
9	Jakob Fuglsang (DEN)	Astana–Premier Tech	+ 2' 25"
10	Pello Bilbao (ESP)	Team Bahrain Victorious	+ 2' 39"
