= 2018 Tour of California =

2018 UCI World Tour, race 22 of 37

Race details
- Dates: May 13–19, 2018
- Stages: 7
- Distance: 645 mi (1,038 km)

Results
Jersey awarded to the overall winner	Winner	Egan Bernal (COL)	(Team Sky)
	Second	Tejay van Garderen (USA)	(BMC Racing Team)
	Third	Daniel Martínez (COL)	(EF Education First–Drapac)
Jersey awarded to the mountains classification winner	Mountains	Toms Skujiņš (LAT)	(Trek–Segafredo)
Jersey awarded to the youth classification winner	Youth	Egan Bernal (COL)	(Team Sky)
Jersey awarded to the sprints classification winner	Sprints	Fernando Gaviria (COL)	(Quick-Step Floors)
	Team	Team Sky	

The 2018 Tour of California was a road cycling stage race that took place between May 13 and 19, 2018 in California, United States. It was the thirteenth edition of the Tour of California and the twenty-second event of the 2018 UCI World Tour.

== Teams ==
As a newer event to the UCI World Tour, all UCI WorldTeams were invited to the race, but not obligated to compete in the race. As such, thirteen of the eighteen WorldTeams competed in the race. Four UCI Professional Continental teams also competed making a 17-team peloton. Each team had a maximum of seven riders:

UCI WorldTeams

- AG2R La Mondiale
- Team Dimension Data
- LottoNL–Jumbo
- Team Sky
- UAE Team Emirates
- BMC Racing Team
- EF Education First–Drapac p/b Cannondale
- Mitchelton–Scott
- Team Sunweb
- Bora–Hansgrohe
- Team Katusha–Alpecin
- Quick-Step Floors
- Trek–Segafredo

UCI Professional Continental teams

- Hagens Berman Axeon
- UnitedHealthcare
- Holowesko Citadel p/b Arapahoe Resources
- Rally Cycling

== Route ==
Stage characteristics and winners
Stage	Date	Course	Distance	Type	Stage winner
1	13 May	Long Beach to Long Beach	134.5 km (83.6 mi)	Flat stage	Fernando Gaviria (COL)
2	14 May	Ventura to Santa Barbara County (Gibraltar Road)	157 km (98 mi)	Mountain stage	Egan Bernal (COL)
3	15 May	King City to WeatherTech Raceway Laguna Seca	197 km (122 mi)	Medium mountain stage	Toms Skujiņš (LAT)
4	16 May	San Jose to Morgan Hill	34.7 km (21.6 mi)	Individual time trial	Tejay van Garderen (USA)
5	17 May	Stockton to Elk Grove	176.5 km (109.7 mi)	Flat stage	Fernando Gaviria (COL)
6	18 May	Folsom to South Lake Tahoe	196.5 km (122.1 mi)	Mountain stage	Egan Bernal (COL)
7	19 May	Sacramento to Sacramento	143 km (89 mi)	Flat stage	Fernando Gaviria (COL)

== Stages ==
=== Stage 1 ===
Stage 1 result

Rank	Rider	Team	Time
1	Fernando Gaviria (COL)	Quick-Step Floors	3h 02' 23"
2	Caleb Ewan (AUS)	Mitchelton–Scott	s.t.
3	Peter Sagan (SVK)	Bora–Hansgrohe	s.t.
4	Marcel Kittel (GER)	Team Katusha–Alpecin	s.t.
5	Alexander Kristoff (NOR)	UAE Team Emirates	s.t.
6	Jasper Philipsen (BEL)	Hagens Berman Axeon	s.t.
7	Kiel Reijnen (USA)	Trek–Segafredo	s.t.
8	Max Walscheid (GER)	Team Sunweb	s.t.
9	Tyler Magner (USA)	Rally Cycling	s.t.
10	Mark Cavendish (GBR)	Team Dimension Data	s.t.

General classification after Stage 1

Rank	Rider	Team	Time
1	Fernando Gaviria (COL)	Quick-Step Floors	3h 02' 13"
2	Caleb Ewan (AUS)	Mitchelton–Scott	+ 4"
3	Tanner Putt (USA)	UnitedHealthcare	s.t.
4	Peter Sagan (SVK)	Bora–Hansgrohe	+ 6"
5	Andrei Krasilnikau (BLR)	Holowesko Citadel p/b Arapahoe Resources	s.t.
6	Mark Cavendish (GBR)	Team Dimension Data	+ 9"
7	Álvaro Hodeg (COL)	Quick-Step Floors	s.t.
8	Marcel Kittel (GER)	Team Katusha–Alpecin	+ 10"
9	Alexander Kristoff (NOR)	UAE Team Emirates	s.t.
10	Jasper Philipsen (BEL)	Hagens Berman Axeon	s.t.

=== Stage 2 ===
Stage 2 result

Rank	Rider	Team	Time
1	Egan Bernal (COL)	Team Sky	4h 14' 00"
2	Rafał Majka (POL)	Bora–Hansgrohe	+ 21"
3	Adam Yates (GBR)	Mitchelton–Scott	+ 25"
4	Antwan Tolhoek (NED)	LottoNL–Jumbo	+ 30"
5	Daniel Martínez (COL)	EF Education First–Drapac p/b Cannondale	s.t.
6	Kristijan Đurasek (CRO)	UAE Team Emirates	s.t.
7	Mathias Frank (SUI)	AG2R La Mondiale	+ 40"
8	Tejay van Garderen (USA)	BMC Racing Team	+ 50"
9	Edward Ravasi (ITA)	UAE Team Emirates	+ 59"
10	Ruben Guerreiro (POR)	Trek–Segafredo	+ 1' 01"

General classification after Stage 2

Rank	Rider	Team	Time
1	Egan Bernal (COL)	Team Sky	7h 16' 13"
2	Rafał Majka (POL)	Bora–Hansgrohe	+ 25"
3	Adam Yates (GBR)	Mitchelton–Scott	+ 31"
4	Antwan Tolhoek (NED)	LottoNL–Jumbo	+ 40"
5	Kristijan Đurasek (CRO)	UAE Team Emirates	s.t.
6	Daniel Martínez (COL)	EF Education First–Drapac p/b Cannondale	s.t.
7	Mathias Frank (SUI)	AG2R La Mondiale	+ 50"
8	Tejay van Garderen (USA)	BMC Racing Team	+ 1' 00"
9	Edward Ravasi (ITA)	UAE Team Emirates	+ 1' 09"
10	Ruben Guerreiro (POR)	Trek–Segafredo	+ 1' 11"

=== Stage 3 ===
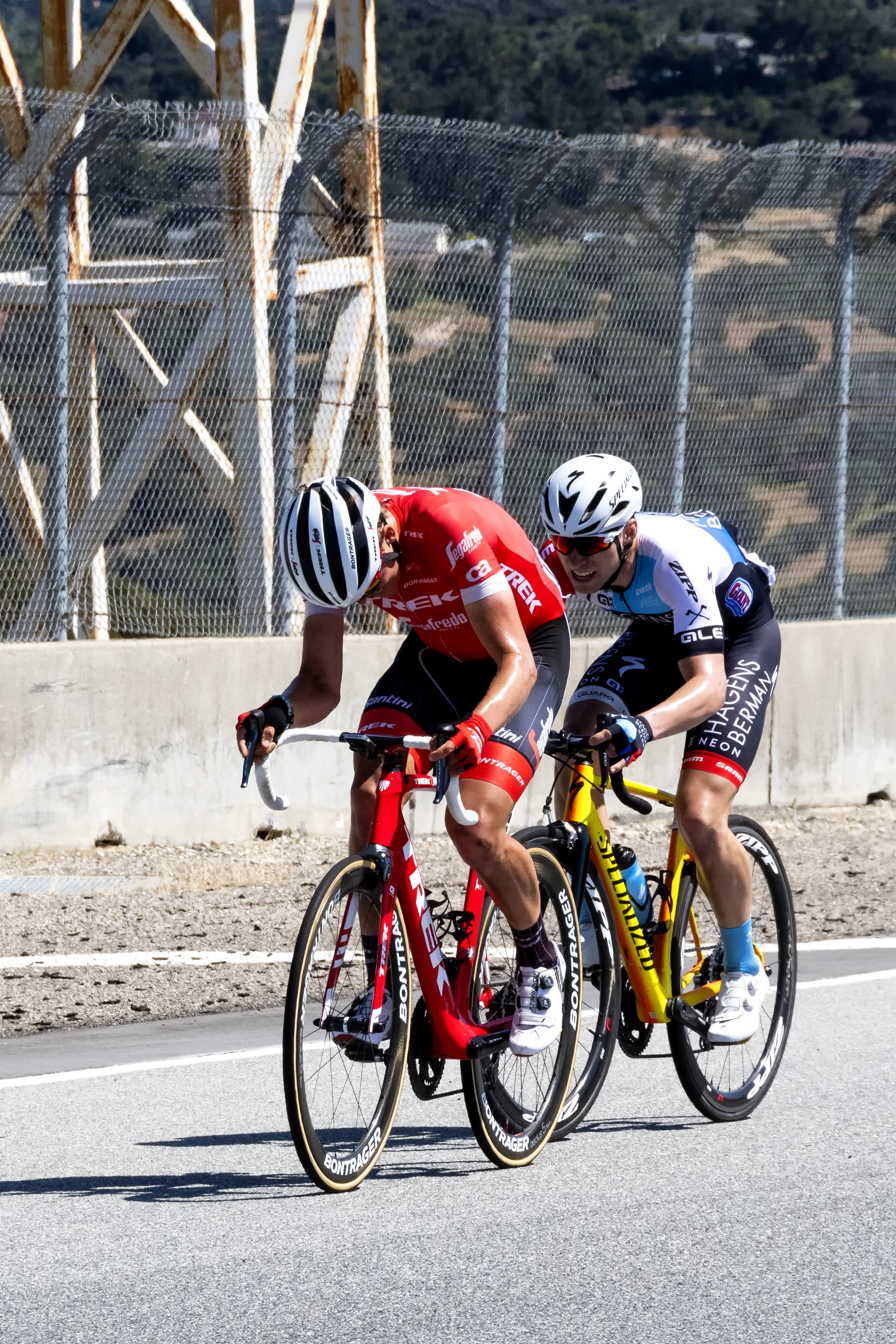
The stage winner Toms Skujiņš and second place rider Sean Bennett

Stage 3 result

Rank	Rider	Team	Time
1	Toms Skujiņš (LAT)	Trek–Segafredo	4h 52' 47"
2	Sean Bennett (USA)	Hagens Berman Axeon	+ 3"
3	Caleb Ewan (AUS)	Mitchelton–Scott	+ 8"
4	Peter Sagan (SVK)	Bora–Hansgrohe	s.t.
5	Egan Bernal (COL)	Team Sky	s.t.
6	Adam Yates (GBR)	Mitchelton–Scott	s.t.
7	Alex Howes (USA)	EF Education First–Drapac p/b Cannondale	s.t.
8	Tom-Jelte Slagter (NED)	Team Dimension Data	s.t.
9	Brent Bookwalter (USA)	BMC Racing Team	s.t.
10	Will Barta (USA)	Hagens Berman Axeon	s.t.

General classification after Stage 3

Rank	Rider	Team	Time
1	Egan Bernal (COL)	Team Sky	12h 09' 08"
2	Rafał Majka (POL)	Bora–Hansgrohe	+ 25"
3	Adam Yates (GBR)	Mitchelton–Scott	+ 31"
4	Antwan Tolhoek (NED)	LottoNL–Jumbo	+ 40"
5	Kristijan Đurasek (CRO)	UAE Team Emirates	s.t.
6	Daniel Martínez (COL)	EF Education First–Drapac p/b Cannondale	s.t.
7	Mathias Frank (SUI)	AG2R La Mondiale	+ 50"
8	Tejay van Garderen (USA)	BMC Racing Team	+ 1' 00"
9	Ruben Guerreiro (POR)	Trek–Segafredo	+ 1' 11"
10	Laurens De Plus (BEL)	Quick-Step Floors	+ 1' 14"

=== Stage 4 ===
Stage 4 result

Rank	Rider	Team	Time
1	Tejay van Garderen (USA)	BMC Racing Team	40' 47"
2	Patrick Bevin (NZL)	BMC Racing Team	+ 7"
3	Tao Geoghegan Hart (GBR)	Team Sky	+ 32"
4	Lawson Craddock (USA)	EF Education First–Drapac p/b Cannondale	+ 46"
5	Filippo Ganna (ITA)	UAE Team Emirates	+ 49"
6	Mikkel Bjerg (DEN)	Hagens Berman Axeon	+ 53"
7	Jack Bauer (NZL)	Mitchelton–Scott	+ 55"
8	Neilson Powless (USA)	Team Dimension Data	+ 56"
9	Maciej Bodnar (POL)	Bora–Hansgrohe	+ 57"
10	Daniel Martínez (COL)	EF Education First–Drapac p/b Cannondale	s.t.

General classification after Stage 4

Rank	Rider	Team	Time
1	Tejay van Garderen (USA)	BMC Racing Team	12h 50' 55"
2	Egan Bernal (COL)	Team Sky	+ 23"
3	Daniel Martínez (COL)	EF Education First–Drapac p/b Cannondale	+ 37"
4	Tao Geoghegan Hart (GBR)	Team Sky	+ 52"
5	Adam Yates (GBR)	Mitchelton–Scott	+ 1' 07"
6	Rafał Majka (POL)	Bora–Hansgrohe	+ 1' 29"
7	Brandon McNulty (USA)	Rally Cycling	+ 2' 08"
8	Laurens De Plus (BEL)	Quick-Step Floors	+ 2' 13"
9	Kristijan Đurasek (CRO)	UAE Team Emirates	+ 2' 15"
10	Brent Bookwalter (USA)	BMC Racing Team	+ 2' 34"

=== Stage 5 ===
Stage 5 result

Rank	Rider	Team	Time
1	Fernando Gaviria (COL)	Quick-Step Floors	4h 04' 34"
2	Caleb Ewan (AUS)	Mitchelton–Scott	s.t.
3	Peter Sagan (SVK)	Bora–Hansgrohe	s.t.
4	Rick Zabel (GER)	Team Katusha–Alpecin	s.t.
5	John Murphy (USA)	Holowesko Citadel p/b Arapahoe Resources	s.t.
6	Sean Bennett (USA)	Hagens Berman Axeon	s.t.
7	Lucas Sebastián Haedo (ARG)	UnitedHealthcare	s.t.
8	Ivo Oliveira (POR)	Hagens Berman Axeon	s.t.
9	Alexander Kristoff (NOR)	UAE Team Emirates	s.t.
10	Travis McCabe (USA)	UnitedHealthcare	s.t.

General classification after Stage 5

Rank	Rider	Team	Time
1	Tejay van Garderen (USA)	BMC Racing Team	16h 55' 29"
2	Egan Bernal (COL)	Team Sky	+ 23"
3	Daniel Martínez (COL)	EF Education First–Drapac p/b Cannondale	+ 37"
4	Adam Yates (GBR)	Mitchelton–Scott	+ 1' 07"
5	Tao Geoghegan Hart (GBR)	Team Sky	+ 1' 15"
6	Rafał Majka (POL)	Bora–Hansgrohe	+ 1' 29"
7	Brandon McNulty (USA)	Rally Cycling	+ 2' 08"
8	Laurens De Plus (BEL)	Quick-Step Floors	+ 2' 13"
9	Kristijan Đurasek (CRO)	UAE Team Emirates	+ 2' 15"
10	Brent Bookwalter (USA)	BMC Racing Team	+ 2' 34"

=== Stage 6 ===
Stage 6 result

Rank	Rider	Team	Time
1	Egan Bernal (COL)	Team Sky	5h 30' 58"
2	Adam Yates (GBR)	Mitchelton–Scott	+ 1' 28"
3	Tao Geoghegan Hart (GBR)	Team Sky	+ 1' 30"
4	Brandon McNulty (USA)	Rally Cycling	+ 1' 33"
5	Jai Hindley (AUS)	Team Sunweb	+ 1' 38"
6	Mathias Frank (SUI)	AG2R La Mondiale	s.t.
7	Tejay van Garderen (USA)	BMC Racing Team	s.t.
8	Rafał Majka (POL)	Bora–Hansgrohe	+ 1' 45"
9	Edward Ravasi (ITA)	UAE Team Emirates	+ 1' 46"
10	Daniel Martínez (COL)	EF Education First–Drapac p/b Cannondale	+ 1' 50"

General classification after Stage 6

Rank	Rider	Team	Time
1	Egan Bernal (COL)	Team Sky	22h 26' 40"
2	Tejay van Garderen (USA)	BMC Racing Team	+ 1' 25"
3	Daniel Martínez (COL)	EF Education First–Drapac p/b Cannondale	+ 2' 14"
4	Adam Yates (GBR)	Mitchelton–Scott	+ 2' 16"
5	Tao Geoghegan Hart (GBR)	Team Sky	+ 2' 28"
6	Rafał Majka (POL)	Bora–Hansgrohe	+ 3' 01"
7	Brandon McNulty (USA)	Rally Cycling	+ 3' 28"
8	Laurens De Plus (BEL)	Quick-Step Floors	+ 3' 50"
9	Kristijan Đurasek (CRO)	UAE Team Emirates	+ 3' 59"
10	Mathias Frank (SUI)	AG2R La Mondiale	+ 4' 01"

=== Stage 7 ===
Stage 7 result

Rank	Rider	Team	Time
1	Fernando Gaviria (COL)	Quick-Step Floors	3h 07' 39"
2	Max Walscheid (GER)	Team Sunweb	s.t.
3	Caleb Ewan (AUS)	Mitchelton–Scott	s.t.
4	Peter Sagan (SVK)	Bora–Hansgrohe	s.t.
5	Miguel Bryon (USA)	Holowesko Citadel p/b Arapahoe Resources	s.t.
6	Alexander Kristoff (NOR)	UAE Team Emirates	s.t.
7	Michael Rice (AUS)	Hagens Berman Axeon	s.t.
8	Tyler Magner (USA)	Rally Cycling	s.t.
9	Daniel McLay (GBR)	EF Education First–Drapac p/b Cannondale	s.t.
10	Kiel Reijnen (USA)	Trek–Segafredo	s.t.

General classification after Stage 7

Rank	Rider	Team	Time
1	Egan Bernal (COL)	Team Sky	25h 34' 19"
2	Tejay van Garderen (USA)	BMC Racing Team	+ 1' 25"
3	Daniel Martínez (COL)	EF Education First–Drapac p/b Cannondale	+ 2' 14"
4	Adam Yates (GBR)	Mitchelton–Scott	+ 2' 16"
5	Tao Geoghegan Hart (GBR)	Team Sky	+ 2' 28"
6	Rafał Majka (POL)	Bora–Hansgrohe	+ 3' 01"
7	Brandon McNulty (USA)	Rally Cycling	+ 3' 28"
8	Laurens De Plus (BEL)	Quick-Step Floors	+ 3' 50"
9	Kristijan Đurasek (CRO)	UAE Team Emirates	+ 3' 59"
10	Mathias Frank (SUI)	AG2R La Mondiale	+ 4' 01"

== Classification leadership table ==
In the Tour of California, five different jerseys were awarded. For the general classification, calculated by adding each cyclist's finishing times on each stage, and allowing time bonuses for the first three finishers at intermediate sprints and at the finish of mass-start stages, the leader received a yellow jersey. This classification was considered the most important of the 2017 Tour of California, and the winner of the classification was considered the winner of the race.

Additionally, there was a sprints classification, which awarded a green jersey. In the sprints classification, cyclists received points for finishing in the top 10 in a stage. For winning a stage, a rider earned 15 points, with 12 for second, 9 for third, 7 for fourth with a point fewer per place down to a single point for 10th place. Points towards the classification could also be accrued – awarded on a 3–2–1 scale – at intermediate sprint points during each stage; these intermediate sprints also offered bonus seconds towards the general classification. There was also a mountains classification, the leadership of which was marked by a white jersey with red polka dots. In the mountains classification, points were won by reaching the top of a climb before other cyclists, with more points available for the higher-categorised climbs.

The fourth jersey represented the young rider classification, marked by a predominantly "white design" jersey. This was decided in the same way as the general classification, but only riders born after January 1, 1992, were eligible to be ranked in the classification. There was also a classification for teams, in which the times of the best three cyclists per team on each stage were added together; the leading team at the end of the race was the team with the lowest total time. In addition, there was a combativity award given after each stage to the rider considered, by a jury, to have "who best exemplifies the character of those engaged in the fight against cancer / heart disease", in line with the jersey's sponsors. This award was marked by a blue jersey.

Stage	Winner	General classification	Sprints classification	Mountains classification	Young rider classification	Most courageous rider	Team classification
1	Fernando Gaviria	Fernando Gaviria	Fernando Gaviria	Not awarded	Fernando Gaviria	Tanner Putt	Mitchelton–Scott
2	Egan Bernal	Egan Bernal	Egan Bernal	Egan Bernal	Egan Bernal	Rubén Companioni	Trek–Segafredo
3	Toms Skujiņš	Egan Bernal	Egan Bernal	Egan Bernal	Egan Bernal	Ian Garrison	Trek–Segafredo
4	Tejay van Garderen	Tejay van Garderen	Egan Bernal	Egan Bernal	Egan Bernal	Ian Garrison	BMC Racing Team
5	Fernando Gaviria	Tejay van Garderen	Caleb Ewan	Egan Bernal	Egan Bernal	Fabian Lienhard	BMC Racing Team
6	Egan Bernal	Egan Bernal	Egan Bernal	Toms Skujiņš	Egan Bernal	Lawson Craddock	Team Sky
7	Fernando Gaviria	Egan Bernal	Fernando Gaviria	Toms Skujiņš	Egan Bernal	Mikkel Bjerg	Team Sky
Final		Egan Bernal	Fernando Gaviria	Toms Skujiņš	Egan Bernal	Not awarded	Team Sky
