= 2018 Tour de Romandie =

Cycling race

2018 UCI World Tour, race 19 of 37

Race details
- Dates: 24–29 April 2018
- Stages: 6
- Distance: 685.4 km (425.9 mi)
- Winning time: 17h 09' 00"

Results
Jersey awarded to the overall winner	Winner	Primož Roglič (SLO)	(LottoNL–Jumbo)
	Second	Egan Bernal (COL)	(Team Sky)
	Third	Richie Porte (AUS)	(BMC Racing Team)
Jersey awarded to the points classification winner	Points	Thomas De Gendt (BEL)	(Lotto–Soudal)
Jersey awarded to the mountains classification winner	Mountains	Thomas De Gendt (BEL)	(Lotto–Soudal)
Jersey awarded to the youth classification winner	Youth	Egan Bernal (COL)	(Team Sky)
	Team	UAE Team Emirates	

The 2018 Tour de Romandie was a road cycling stage race that took place between 24 and 29 April 2018 in Romandie, Switzerland. It was the 72nd edition of the Tour de Romandie and the nineteenth event of the 2018 UCI World Tour. It was won by Primož Roglič of LottoNL–Jumbo.

== Teams ==
As the Tour de Romandie is a UCI World Tour event, all eighteen UCI WorldTeams were invited automatically and were obliged to enter a team in the race. The only non-WorldTeam in the race was Wanty–Groupe Gobert. Each team had a maximum of seven riders.

UCI WorldTeams

- AG2R La Mondiale
- Astana
- Bahrain–Merida
- BMC Racing Team
- Bora–Hansgrohe
- EF Education First–Drapac p/b Cannondale
- Groupama–FDJ
- Lotto–Soudal
- LottoNL–Jumbo
- Movistar Team
- Mitchelton–Scott
- Quick-Step Floors
- Team Dimension Data
- Team Katusha–Alpecin
- Team Sky
- Team Sunweb
- Trek–Segafredo
- UAE Team Emirates

UCI Professional Continental teams

- Wanty–Groupe Gobert

== Route ==
Stage characteristics and winners
Stage	Date	Route	Distance	Type	Winner
P	24 April	Fribourg	4.0 km (2.5 mi)	Prologue	Michael Matthews (AUS)
1	25 April	Fribourg to Delémont	166.6 km (103.5 mi)	Hilly stage	Omar Fraile (ESP)
2	26 April	Delémont to Yverdon-les-Bains	173.9 km (108.1 mi)	Hilly stage	Thomas De Gendt (BEL)
3	27 April	Ollon to Villars-sur-Ollon	9.9 km (6.2 mi)	Mountain time trial	Egan Bernal (COL)
4	28 April	Sion to Sion	149.2 km (92.7 mi)	Mountain stage	Jakob Fuglsang (DEN)
5	29 April	Mont-sur-Rolle to Genève	181.8 km (113.0 mi)	Hilly stage	Pascal Ackermann (GER)

== Stages ==
=== Prologue ===
24 April 2018 — Fribourg, 4.0 kilometres (2.5 mi), individual time trial (ITT)

Prologue result
Rank	Rider	Team	Time
1	Michael Matthews (AUS)	Team Sunweb	5' 33"
2	Tom Bohli (SWI)	BMC Racing Team	+ 1"
3	Primož Roglič (SLO)	LottoNL–Jumbo	+ 1"
4	Rohan Dennis (AUS)	BMC Racing Team	+ 1"
5	Victor Campenaerts (BEL)	Lotto–Soudal	+ 5"
6	Geraint Thomas (GBR)	Team Sky	+ 5"
7	Will Clarke (AUS)	EF Education First–Drapac p/b Cannondale	+ 6"
8	Diego Rosa (ITA)	Team Sky	+ 6"
9	Pierre Latour (FRA)	AG2R La Mondiale	+ 6"
10	Gorka Izagirre (SPA)	Bahrain–Merida	+ 9"

General classification after prologue
Rank	Rider	Team	Time
1	Michael Matthews (AUS)	Team Sunweb	5' 33"
2	Tom Bohli (SWI)	BMC Racing Team	+ 1"
3	Primož Roglič (SLO)	LottoNL–Jumbo	+ 1"
4	Rohan Dennis (AUS)	BMC Racing Team	+ 1"
5	Victor Campenaerts (BEL)	Lotto–Soudal	+ 5"
6	Geraint Thomas (GBR)	Team Sky	+ 5"
7	Will Clarke (AUS)	EF Education First–Drapac p/b Cannondale	+ 6"
8	Diego Rosa (ITA)	Team Sky	+ 6"
9	Pierre Latour (FRA)	AG2R La Mondiale	+ 6"
10	Gorka Izagirre (SPA)	Bahrain–Merida	+ 9"

=== Stage 1 ===
25 April 2018 — Fribourg to Delémont, 166.6 kilometres (103.5 mi)

Stage 1 result
Rank	Rider	Team	Time
1	Omar Fraile (SPA)	Astana	4h 03' 42"
2	Sonny Colbrelli (ITA)	Bahrain–Merida	+ 0"
3	Rui Costa (POR)	UAE Team Emirates	+ 0"
4	Rudy Molard (FRA)	Groupama–FDJ	+ 0"
5	Gorka Izagirre (SPA)	Bahrain–Merida	+ 0"
6	Egan Bernal (COL)	Team Sky	+ 0"
7	Pierre Latour (FRA)	AG2R La Mondiale	+ 0"
8	Xandro Meurisse (BEL)	Wanty–Groupe Gobert	+ 0"
9	Merhawi Kudus (ERI)	Team Dimension Data	+ 0"
10	Eros Capecchi (ITA)	Quick-Step Floors	+ 0"

General classification after stage 1
Rank	Rider	Team	Time
1	Primož Roglič (SLO)	LottoNL–Jumbo	4h 09' 16"
2	Rohan Dennis (AUS)	BMC Racing Team	+ 0"
3	Geraint Thomas (GBR)	Team Sky	+ 4"
4	Diego Rosa (ITA)	Team Sky	+ 5"
5	Pierre Latour (FRA)	AG2R La Mondiale	+ 5"
6	Gorka Izagirre (SPA)	Bahrain–Merida	+ 8"
7	Egan Bernal (COL)	Team Sky	+ 10"
8	Jonathan Castroviejo (SPA)	Team Sky	+ 10"
9	Pierre Rolland (FRA)	EF Education First–Drapac p/b Cannondale	+ 10"
10	Richie Porte (AUS)	BMC Racing Team	+ 13"

=== Stage 2 ===
26 April 2018 — Delémont to Yverdon-les-Bains, 173.9 kilometres (108.1 mi)

Stage 2 result
Rank	Rider	Team	Time
1	Thomas De Gendt (BEL)	Lotto–Soudal	4h 03' 05"
2	Sonny Colbrelli (ITA)	Bahrain–Merida	+ 2' 04"
3	Samuel Dumoulin (FRA)	AG2R La Mondiale	+ 2' 04"
4	Michael Matthews (AUS)	Team Sunweb	+ 2' 04"
5	Michael Mørkøv (DEN)	Quick-Step Floors	+ 2' 04"
6	Xandro Meurisse (BEL)	Wanty–Groupe Gobert	+ 2' 04"
7	Diego Rosa (ITA)	Team Sky	+ 2' 04"
8	Egan Bernal (COL)	Team Sky	+ 2' 04"
9	Pierre Latour (FRA)	AG2R La Mondiale	+ 2' 04"
10	Antoine Duchesne (CAN)	Groupama–FDJ	+ 2' 04"

General classification after stage 2
Rank	Rider	Team	Time
1	Primož Roglič (SLO)	LottoNL–Jumbo	8h 14' 25"
2	Rohan Dennis (AUS)	BMC Racing Team	+ 0"
3	Geraint Thomas (GBR)	Team Sky	+ 4"
4	Diego Rosa (ITA)	Team Sky	+ 5"
5	Pierre Latour (FRA)	AG2R La Mondiale	+ 5"
6	Gorka Izagirre (SPA)	Bahrain–Merida	+ 8"
7	Egan Bernal (COL)	Team Sky	+ 10"
8	Jonathan Castroviejo (SPA)	Team Sky	+ 10"
9	Pierre Rolland (FRA)	EF Education First–Drapac p/b Cannondale	+ 10"
10	Richie Porte (AUS)	BMC Racing Team	+ 13"

=== Stage 3 ===
27 April 2018 — Ollon to Villars-sur-Ollon, 9.9 kilometres (6.2 mi), individual time trial (ITT)

Stage 3 result
Rank	Rider	Team	Time
1	Egan Bernal (COL)	Team Sky	25' 10"
2	Primož Roglič (SLO)	LottoNL–Jumbo	+ 4"
3	Richie Porte (AUS)	BMC Racing Team	+ 18"
4	Steven Kruijswijk (NED)	LottoNL–Jumbo	+ 48"
5	Rui Costa (POR)	UAE Team Emirates	+ 1' 06"
6	Pierre Latour (FRA)	AG2R La Mondiale	+ 1' 21"
7	Rohan Dennis (AUS)	BMC Racing Team	+ 1' 26"
8	Dan Martin (IRE)	UAE Team Emirates	+ 1' 28"
9	Emanuel Buchmann (GER)	Bora–Hansgrohe	+ 1' 30"
10	Simon Špilak (SLO)	Team Katusha–Alpecin	+ 1' 43"

General classification after stage 3
Rank	Rider	Team	Time
1	Primož Roglič (SLO)	LottoNL–Jumbo	8h 39' 39"
2	Egan Bernal (COL)	Team Sky	+ 6"
3	Richie Porte (AUS)	BMC Racing Team	+ 27"
4	Steven Kruijswijk (NED)	LottoNL–Jumbo	+ 1' 02"
5	Rui Costa (POR)	UAE Team Emirates	+ 1' 17"
6	Rohan Dennis (AUS)	BMC Racing Team	+ 1' 22"
7	Pierre Latour (FRA)	AG2R La Mondiale	+ 1' 22"
8	Dan Martin (IRE)	UAE Team Emirates	+ 1' 42"
9	Emanuel Buchmann (GER)	Bora–Hansgrohe	+ 1' 42"
10	Ion Izagirre (SPA)	Bahrain–Merida	+ 1' 55"

=== Stage 4 ===
28 April 2018 — Sion to Sion, 149.2 kilometres (92.7 mi)

Stage 4 result
Rank	Rider	Team	Time
1	Jakob Fuglsang (DEN)	Astana	4h 18' 48"
2	Primož Roglič (SLO)	LottoNL–Jumbo	+ 48"
3	Egan Bernal (COL)	Team Sky	+ 48"
4	Rui Costa (POR)	UAE Team Emirates	+ 48"
5	Richie Porte (AUS)	BMC Racing Team	+ 50"
6	Rohan Dennis (AUS)	BMC Racing Team	+ 2' 09"
7	Pierre Latour (FRA)	AG2R La Mondiale	+ 2' 09"
~~8~~	~~Jaime Rosón~~ (SPA)	~~Movistar Team~~	~~+ 2' 09"~~
9	Emanuel Buchmann (GER)	Bora–Hansgrohe	+ 2' 09"
10	Merhawi Kudus (ERI)	Team Dimension Data	+ 2' 09"

General classification after stage 4
Rank	Rider	Team	Time
1	Primož Roglič (SLO)	LottoNL–Jumbo	12h 59' 09"
2	Egan Bernal (COL)	Team Sky	+ 8"
3	Richie Porte (AUS)	BMC Racing Team	+ 35"
4	Jakob Fuglsang (DEN)	Astana	+ 1' 16"
5	Rui Costa (POR)	UAE Team Emirates	+ 1' 23"
6	Steven Kruijswijk (NED)	LottoNL–Jumbo	+ 2' 32"
7	Rohan Dennis (AUS)	BMC Racing Team	+ 2' 49"
8	Pierre Latour (FRA)	AG2R La Mondiale	+ 2' 49"
9	Emanuel Buchmann (GER)	Bora–Hansgrohe	+ 3' 09"
10	Dan Martin (IRE)	UAE Team Emirates	+ 3' 12"

=== Stage 5 ===
29 April 2018 — Mont-sur-Rolle to Genève, 181.8 kilometres (113.0 mi)

Stage 5 result
Rank	Rider	Team	Time
1	Pascal Ackermann (GER)	Bora–Hansgrohe	4h 09' 51"
2	Michael Mørkøv (DEN)	Quick-Step Floors	+ 0"
3	Roberto Ferrari (ITA)	UAE Team Emirates	+ 0"
4	Timothy Dupont (BEL)	Wanty–Groupe Gobert	+ 0"
5	Rüdiger Selig (GER)	Bora–Hansgrohe	+ 0"
6	Sonny Colbrelli (ITA)	Bahrain–Merida	+ 0"
7	Benjamin Thomas (FRA)	Groupama–FDJ	+ 0"
8	Jens Keukeleire (BEL)	Lotto–Soudal	+ 0"
9	Michael Albasini (SWI)	Mitchelton–Scott	+ 0"
10	Samuel Dumoulin (FRA)	AG2R La Mondiale	+ 0"

General classification after stage 5
Rank	Rider	Team	Time
1	Primož Roglič (SLO)	LottoNL–Jumbo	17h 09' 00"
2	Egan Bernal (COL)	Team Sky	+ 8"
3	Richie Porte (AUS)	BMC Racing Team	+ 35"
4	Jakob Fuglsang (DEN)	Astana	+ 1' 16"
5	Rui Costa (POR)	UAE Team Emirates	+ 1' 23"
6	Steven Kruijswijk (NED)	LottoNL–Jumbo	+ 2' 32"
7	Rohan Dennis (AUS)	BMC Racing Team	+ 2' 49"
8	Pierre Latour (FRA)	AG2R La Mondiale	+ 2' 49"
9	Emanuel Buchmann (GER)	Bora–Hansgrohe	+ 3' 09"
10	Dan Martin (IRE)	UAE Team Emirates	+ 3' 12"

== Classification leadership table ==
Stage	Winner	General classification	Points classification	Mountains classification	Young rider classification	Combativity award	Team classification
P	Michael Matthews	Michael Matthews	Michael Matthews	not awarded	Tom Bohli	not awarded	BMC Racing Team
1	Omar Fraile	Primož Roglič	Primož Roglič	Marco Minnaard	Egan Bernal	Marco Minnaard	BMC Racing Team
2	Thomas De Gendt	Primož Roglič	Thomas De Gendt	Marco Minnaard	Egan Bernal	Thomas De Gendt	BMC Racing Team
3	Egan Bernal	Primož Roglič	Thomas De Gendt	Marco Minnaard	Egan Bernal	not awarded	BMC Racing Team
4	Jakob Fuglsang	Primož Roglič	Thomas De Gendt	Thomas De Gendt	Egan Bernal	Egan Bernal	UAE Team Emirates
5	Pascal Ackermann	Primož Roglič	Thomas De Gendt	Thomas De Gendt	Egan Bernal	Alexis Gougeard	UAE Team Emirates
Final		Primož Roglič	Thomas De Gendt	Thomas De Gendt	Egan Bernal	Thomas De Gendt	UAE Team Emirates

== Classification standings ==
=== General classification ===
Final general classification (1–10)
Rank	Rider	Team	Time
1	Primož Roglič (SLO)	LottoNL–Jumbo	17h 09' 00"
2	Egan Bernal (COL)	Team Sky	+ 8"
3	Richie Porte (AUS)	BMC Racing Team	+ 35"
4	Jakob Fuglsang (DEN)	Astana	+ 1' 16"
5	Rui Costa (POR)	UAE Team Emirates	+ 1' 23"
6	Steven Kruijswijk (NED)	LottoNL–Jumbo	+ 2' 32"
7	Rohan Dennis (AUS)	BMC Racing Team	+ 2' 49"
8	Pierre Latour (FRA)	AG2R La Mondiale	+ 2' 49"
9	Emanuel Buchmann (GER)	Bora–Hansgrohe	+ 3' 09"
10	Dan Martin (IRE)	UAE Team Emirates	+ 3' 12"

=== Points classification ===
Final points classification (1–10)
Rank	Rider	Team	Points
1	Thomas De Gendt (BEL)	Lotto–Soudal	112
2	Primož Roglič (SLO)	LottoNL–Jumbo	81
3	Egan Bernal (COL)	Team Sky	80
4	Sonny Colbrelli (ITA)	Bahrain–Merida	74
5	Pierre Latour (FRA)	AG2R La Mondiale	56
6	Rui Costa (POR)	UAE Team Emirates	55
7	Jakob Fuglsang (DEN)	Astana	54
8	Rohan Dennis (AUS)	BMC Racing Team	51
9	Pascal Ackermann (GER)	Bora–Hansgrohe	50
10	Michael Mørkøv (DEN)	Quick-Step Floors	46

=== Mountains classification ===
Final mountains classification (1–10)
Rank	Rider	Team	Points
1	Thomas De Gendt (BEL)	Lotto–Soudal	43
2	Egan Bernal (COL)	Team Sky	36
3	Hugh Carthy (GBR)	EF Education First–Drapac p/b Cannondale	33
4	Primož Roglič (SLO)	LottoNL–Jumbo	27
5	Mikel Nieve (SPA)	Mitchelton–Scott	21
6	Antoine Duchesne (CAN)	Groupama–FDJ	17
7	Alexis Gougeard (FRA)	AG2R La Mondiale	17
8	Pavel Sivakov	Team Sky	15
9	Richie Porte (AUS)	BMC Racing Team	14
10	Rui Costa (POR)	UAE Team Emirates	14

=== Young rider classification ===
Final young rider classification (1–10)
Rank	Rider	Team	Time
1	Egan Bernal (COL)	Team Sky	17h 09' 08"
2	Daniel Felipe Martínez (COL)	EF Education First–Drapac p/b Cannondale	+ 3' 26"
3	David Gaudu (FRA)	Groupama–FDJ	+ 4' 28"
4	Merhawi Kudus (ERI)	Team Dimension Data	+ 5' 13"
5	Lucas Hamilton (AUS)	Mitchelton–Scott	+ 5' 56"
6	Robert Power (AUS)	Mitchelton–Scott	+ 7' 13"
7	Amanuel Ghebreigzabhier (ERI)	Team Dimension Data	+ 7' 35"
8	Hugh Carthy (GBR)	EF Education First–Drapac p/b Cannondale	+ 14' 31"
9	Matteo Fabbro (ITA)	Team Katusha–Alpecin	+ 15' 31"
10	Pavel Sivakov	Team Sky	+ 17' 09"

=== Team classification ===
Final team classification (1–10)
Rank	Team	Time
1	(United Arab Emirates) UAE Team Emirates	51h 35' 39"
2	(Kazakhstan) Astana	+ 1' 17"
3	(United Kingdom) Team Sky	+ 2' 12"
4	Bahrain–Merida	+ 3' 31"
5	(United States) EF Education First–Drapac p/b Cannondale	+ 6' 17"
6	(United States) BMC Racing Team	+ 6' 20"
7	(Australia) Mitchelton–Scott	+ 7' 23"
8	(Spain) Movistar Team	+ 7' 25"
9	(France) AG2R La Mondiale	+ 11' 26"
10	(France) Groupama–FDJ	+ 18' 54"
