= Egan Bernal =

Colombian cyclist

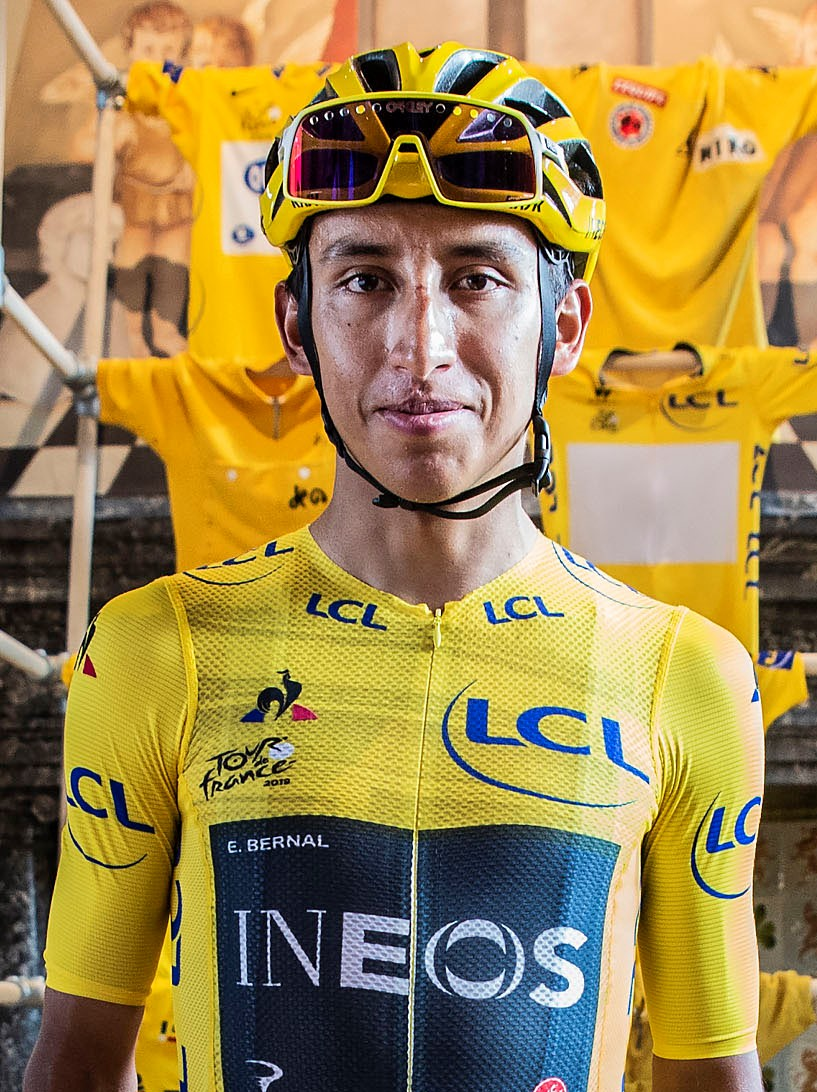
- Bernal in 2019

Personal information
- Full name: Egan Arley Bernal Gómez
- Born: 13 January 1997 (age 29) Bogotá, Colombia
- Height: 1.75 m (5 ft 9 in)
- Weight: 60 kg (132 lb; 9 st 6 lb)

Cycling career
- Sport: Cycling
- Current team: Netcompany–Ineos
- Discipline: Road
- Role: Rider
- Rider type: Climbing specialist

Professional teams
- 2016–2017: Androni Giocattoli–Sidermec
- 2018–present: Netcompany–Ineos

Major wins
- Grand Tours Tour de France General classification (2019) Young rider classification (2019) Giro d'Italia General classification (2021) Young rider classification (2021) 2 individual stages (2021) Vuelta a España 1 individual stage (2025) Stage races Paris–Nice (2019) Tour de Suisse (2019) Tour of California (2018) One-day races and Classics National Road Race Championships (2025, 2026) National Time Trial Championships (2018, 2025) Gran Piemonte (2019)
Medal record
Representing Colombia
Men's mountain bike racing
World Junior Championships
Silver medal – second place	2014 Lillehammer-Hafjell	Cross-country
Bronze medal – third place	2015 Vallnord	Cross-country
Pan American Junior Championships
Gold medal – first place	2015 Cota	Cross-country
Bronze medal – third place	2014 Londrina	Cross-country

Egan Arley Bernal Gómez (born 13 January 1997) is a Colombian professional cyclist who rides for UCI WorldTeam Netcompany–Ineos. He won the 2019 Tour de France, becoming the first Latin American rider to do so, and the youngest winner since 1909. Two years later, Bernal took his second Grand Tour win at the 2021 Giro d'Italia. Bernal was involved in a serious crash in 2022, and although he returned to racing in 2023, he has not raced at the same level as before.

== Early life ==
Egan Bernal was born in Bogotá, Colombia, and raised in the nearby town of Zipaquirá.

He is the eldest child of Germán, who worked at the Salt Cathedral, and Flor, who was employed at a flower factory. His father was a passionate amateur cyclist, and Bernal began riding a second-hand bicycle at the age of five.

At the age of nine, against his father's wishes, he entered and easily won a local race in Zipaquirá. The prize included a training scholarship. Bernal initially focused on mountain biking, excelling in the discipline by winning races in Brazil, Costa Rica, and the United States. He also earned a silver medal in 2014 and a bronze in 2015 at the UCI Mountain Bike World Championships in the junior cross-country category.

== Professional road racing ==
Alongside mountain biking, Bernal had begun to gain success in junior road racing both in Colombia and Italy, winning the Clasica Juventudes Cajica and the Sognando Il Giro delle Fiandre in 2015.

=== 2016–2017 ===
Bernal was signed by Gianni Savio to the Androni Giocattoli–Sidermec team on a four-year contract, partly on the evidence of a VO2 max reading of 88.8ml/kg/min provided by his agent, Paolo Alberati. He began racing among seniors right away, bypassing the usual U23 career route. In 2016, he obtained top 20 results in the La Méditerranéenne, the GP Industria & Artigianato, Settimana Internazionale di Coppi e Bartali and Giro del Trentino, before winning the (then) lower level Tour of Bihor and coming fourth in both the Tour de Slovenie and the Tour de l'Avenir.

2017 saw top ten finishes for Bernal in the Vuelta a San Juan and the Tour de Langkawi. He later finished third overall in the Settimana Internazionale di Coppi e Bartali, second in the Giro dell'Appennino, and ninth in the Tour of the Alps. His first professional wins came in the Sibiu Cycling Tour, with two stage victories as well as the overall. He also won two stages and the overall title at the Tour de l'Avenir. Although he was still under contract to Androni Giocattoli–Sidermec and a contract buyout payment reported to be €350,000 was necessary, Bernal signed a five-year deal with Team Sky from the 2018 season. He completed his time in Savio's team with fifth in the Giro della Toscana and top twenty places in Giro dell'Emilia, Milano–Torino and his first monument, Il Lombardia.

=== 2018 ===
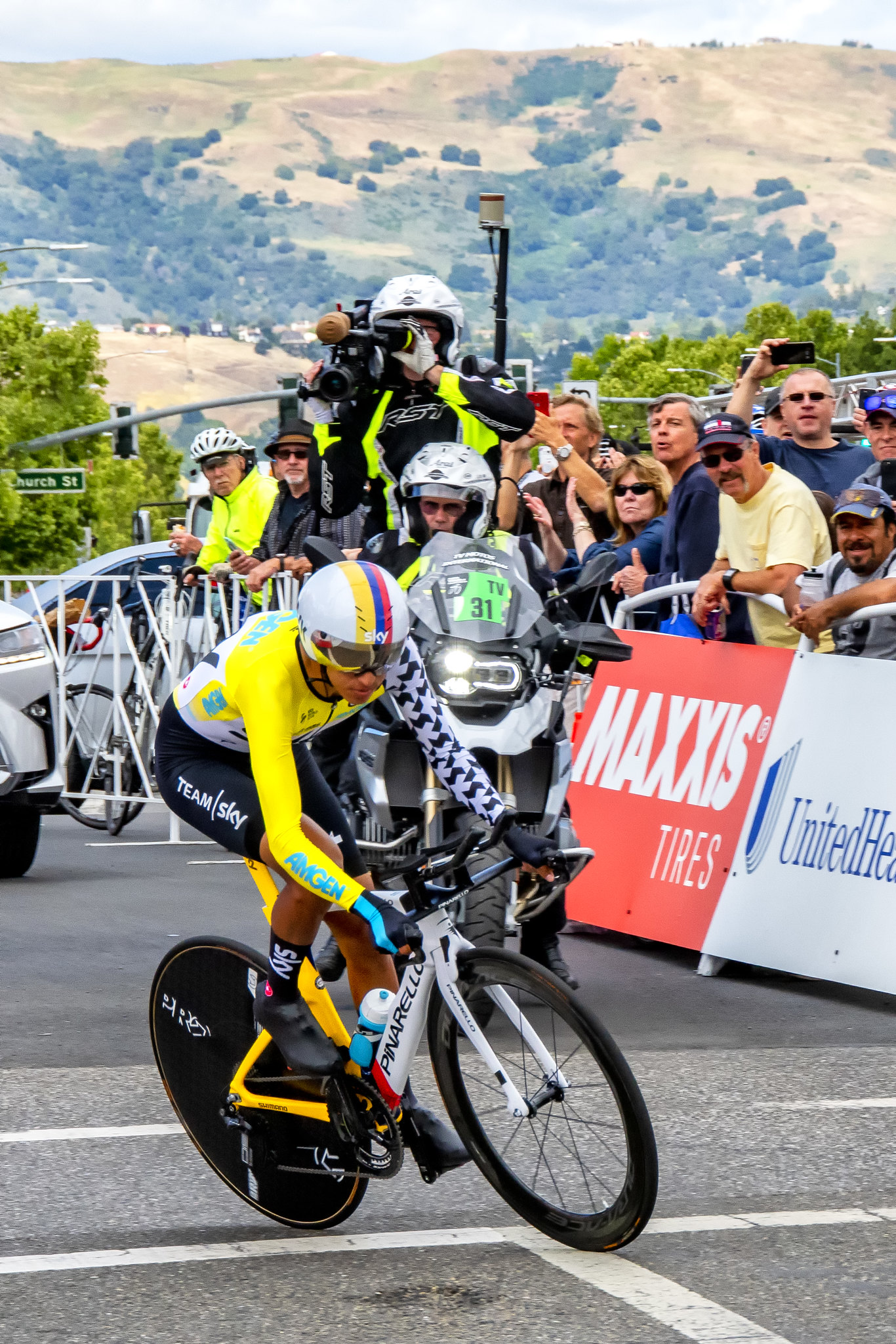
Bernal wearing the leader's jersey at the 2018 Tour of California

Bernal made his debut for Team Sky in the Tour Down Under as team co-leader, in which he won the young rider classification and finished sixth in the overall standings. In February 2018, Bernal won the Colombian National Time Trial Championships. He went on to win the first edition of the Tour Colombia (then called Colombia Oro y Paz), through an attack on the final 20-kilometre (12-mile) climb on the last day.

Bernal's next race was the Volta a Catalunya, in which he was second on general classification when he fell on a wet descent in the final stage, fracturing his clavicle and scapula.

The following month, Bernal competed in the Tour de Romandie, winning stage three of the race, an individual time trial and finishing second overall behind Primož Roglič. In May, Bernal achieved his first UCI World Tour win in the Tour of California, finishing over a minute ahead of Tejay van Garderen, and winning two stages.

In July, he rode the Tour de France as a domestique for team leaders Chris Froome and Geraint Thomas. He was the youngest participant in the race, and was still able to drop many contenders in the mountains.

=== 2019 ===
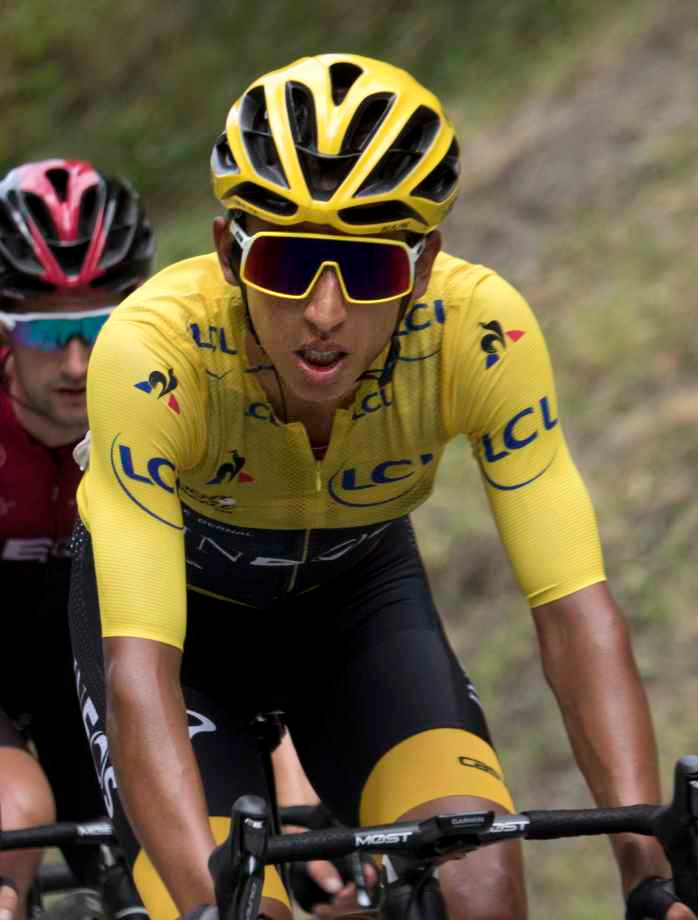
Bernal at the 2019 Tour de France

Bernal started his 2019 season in Colombia. He rode in the national championships and in his home stage race, the Tour Colombia. Bernal, however, was unable to defend his title in the race, finishing fourth overall. Bernal later went to Europe to compete in Paris–Nice. The Colombian impressed in the crosswinds, the individual time trial, and in the mountains, claiming the overall victory ahead of Nairo Quintana.

Bernal next finished third in the Volta a Catalunya, and was scheduled to lead Team Ineos at the Giro d'Italia until he broke a collarbone in a training injury in Andorra. He returned to racing for the Tour de Suisse, in which he won the overall classification and the queen stage.

==== Tour de France victory ====
Bernal was elevated to be co-leader of the team with defending champion Thomas for the Tour de France, because of the absence through injury of Froome. After the stage 2 team time trial he had a top ten position in the general classification, which he retained, despite an unimpressive individual time trial performance, into the three decisive alpine stages. An attack on the last climb of stage 18 saw him move into second place overall, ahead of Thomas, and he took the yellow jersey as race leader on stage 19 after an attack on the Col de l'Iseran. The stage was shortened because of landslides and a severe hail storm with 38 km remaining. Although the stage positions were considered null, times were taken at the top of the Iseran, putting Bernal in the lead with margins of forty five seconds over previous leader Julian Alaphilippe and one minute and eleven seconds over Thomas. He defended his lead on stage 20, another mountain stage, and confirmed his victory with the largely ceremonial ride onto the Champs-Élysées in Paris.

He thus became the first Colombian or South American rider, and second from the Americas, (Note: After Greg LeMond as the apparent wins by Floyd Landis and Lance Armstrong were subsequently overturned.) to win the Tour de France, and also won the best young rider competition. At the time he was the youngest General Classification winner since 1909 and the third youngest ever at 22 years, 196 days. "It's incredible, I don't know what to say", Bernal said. "I've won the Tour but I don't manage to believe it. I need a couple of days to assimilate all this. It's for my family and I just want to hug them. It's a feeling of happiness that I don't know how to describe it." The young champion cyclist went on to say the victory was also for his home country of Colombia. "This is not only my triumph", Bernal said. "It's the triumph of a whole country."

=== 2020 ===
In early 2020, Bernal finished fourth at the Tour Colombia. After the coronavirus break, he won the Route d'Occitanie, and finished second at the Tour de l'Ain. At the Colombian Road Race Championships, he claimed podiums in both the road race and time trial.

At the Tour de France, Bernal was in the top ten of the general classification from stage 2 to stage 14, and led the young rider classification for five stages, but having been 59 seconds behind the leader after stage 14 he lost considerable time on the next two days, after which he withdrew from the race with back pain.

=== 2021 ===
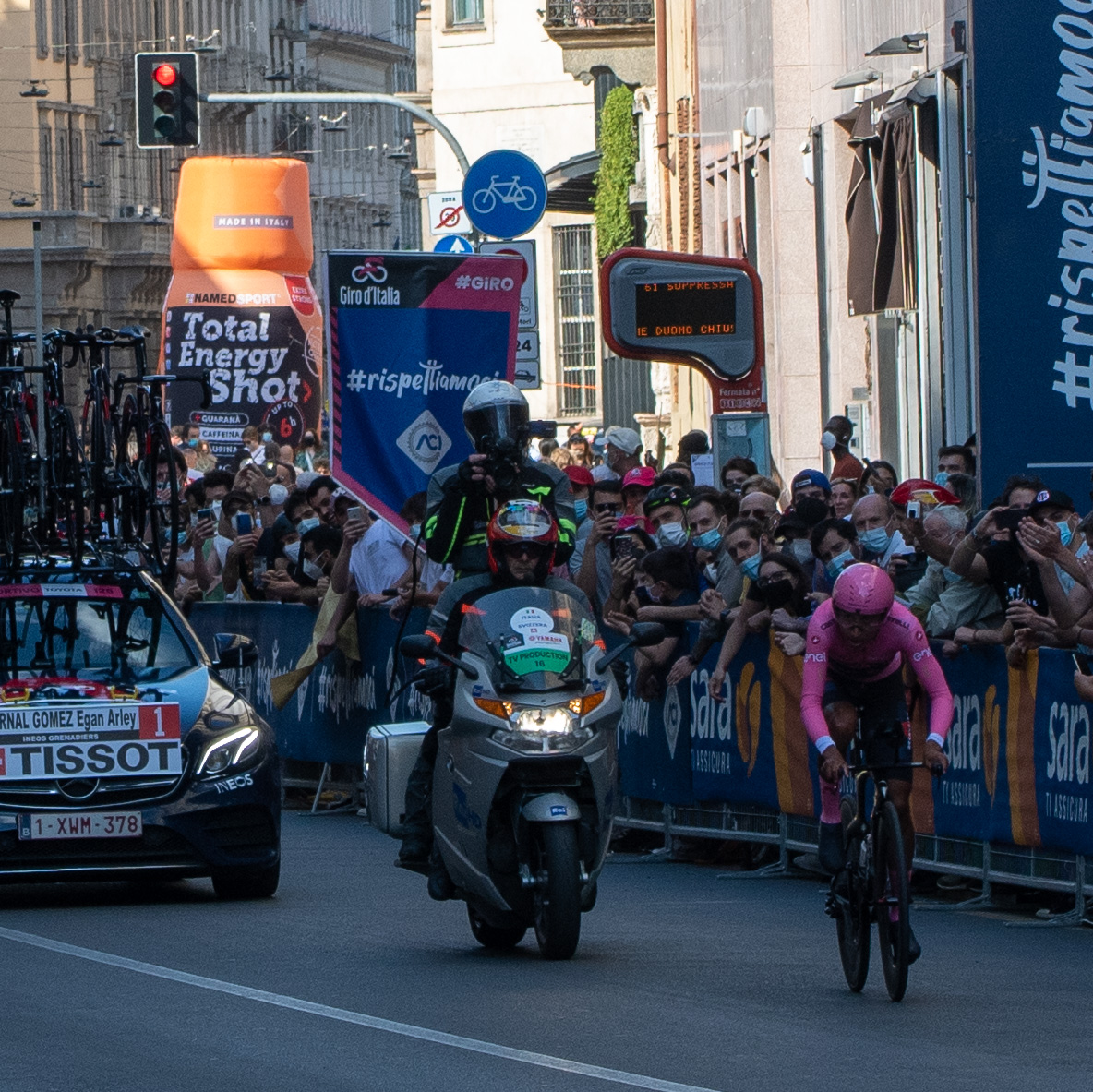
Egan Bernal wearing the Maglia rosa during the final time trial of the 2021 Giro d'Italia

After some early season stage races, including the Tour de la Provence where he took third place, he finished third in Strade Bianche, and in the Tirreno–Adriatico he managed one top five stage finish, and finished in fourth place, 4'13" behind winner Tadej Pogačar.

Bernal entered the 2021 Giro d'Italia as one of the favourites for the race. On the sixth stage to San Giacomo, Bernal put time into his rivals by finishing second behind stage winner Gino Mäder and moving into third place in the overall standings, 16 seconds behind new leader Attila Valter. On the race's ninth stage, Bernal took the first Grand Tour stage win of his career as well as the pink jersey with an attack on the gravel section at the end of the final climb to Campo Felice, emerging with a 15 second lead in the general classification over Remco Evenepoel. Bernal extended his lead on the second stage of the race with gravel sectors, stage 11 to Montalcino, where several of his general classification rivals lost time, including Evenepoel, giving Bernal a 45 second lead over Aleksander Vlasov. He took more time out of his rivals on stage 14, latching onto an attack by Simon Yates on the final climb up Monte Zoncolan before overhauling him to finish the stage in fourth and take a lead of over one and a half minutes in the general classification over Yates, who moved into the runner-up position. Bernal took his second stage win of the race on the sixteenth stage to Cortina d'Ampezzo, which was shortened due to poor weather, crossing the finish line 27 seconds in front of Romain Bardet and Damiano Caruso and opening up a lead in the overall standings of almost two and a half minutes over the latter going into the second rest day.

On the race's final week Bernal maintained his lead over Caruso but lost time to Yates, with the latter and João Almeida distancing Bernal on stage 17's finishing climb to Sega di Ala, cutting the gap between Bernal and Yates by almost a minute, and Yates again attacking on stage 19's final ascent up Alpe di Mera with about six and a half kilometres to go, going on to win the stage with Bernal almost half a minute behind. On the final mountain stage, Caruso and his teammate Pello Bilbao distanced Bernal on the descent of the San Bernardino Pass 50 km from the finish in pursuit of a group of riders from Team DSM including Bardet before working with riders from an earlier breakaway to extend their lead over Bernal to 50 seconds up the penultimate climb of the Splügen Pass. Bernal and his teammates were able to reduce the gap to less than half a minute by the time Caruso crossed the finish line on the Alpe Motta to win the stage, reducing Bernal's general classification lead to just under two minutes. Bernal secured the pink jersey on the final time trial in Milan, conceding another 30 seconds to Caruso to win by a one and a half minute margin. He became the fourth rider to win both the Tour and the Giro before reaching the age of 25, after Gino Bartali, Felice Gimondi and Eddy Merckx, and also the fourth rider to win both the overall and youth classifications in the same Giro, alongside Evgeni Berzin, countryman Nairo Quintana and teammate Tao Geoghegan Hart.

Bernal entered the 2021 Vuelta a España with a very strong team that also included Richard Carapaz and Adam Yates. By his own standards he rode poorly early in the race and was not happy with his own performance. Despite this he took over the young rider classification after stage 3 and was in a top 10 position among the general classification riders for most of the race. On stage 17 which included the climb to the Lagos de Covadonga he launched an attack with 61 kilometers to go. Primož Roglič was the only rider who could go with him and the two continuously built a gap over the other favorites. By the end of the stage he had fallen back and crossed the line with the surviving general classification riders still maintaining his lead over Gino Mäder in the young rider competition and rising to 6th place overall. On the penultimate climb of the race he got caught out in a split among the GC riders and lost the young rider jersey to Mäder, but retained his 6th place after the final ITT on stage 21.

=== 2022 crash ===
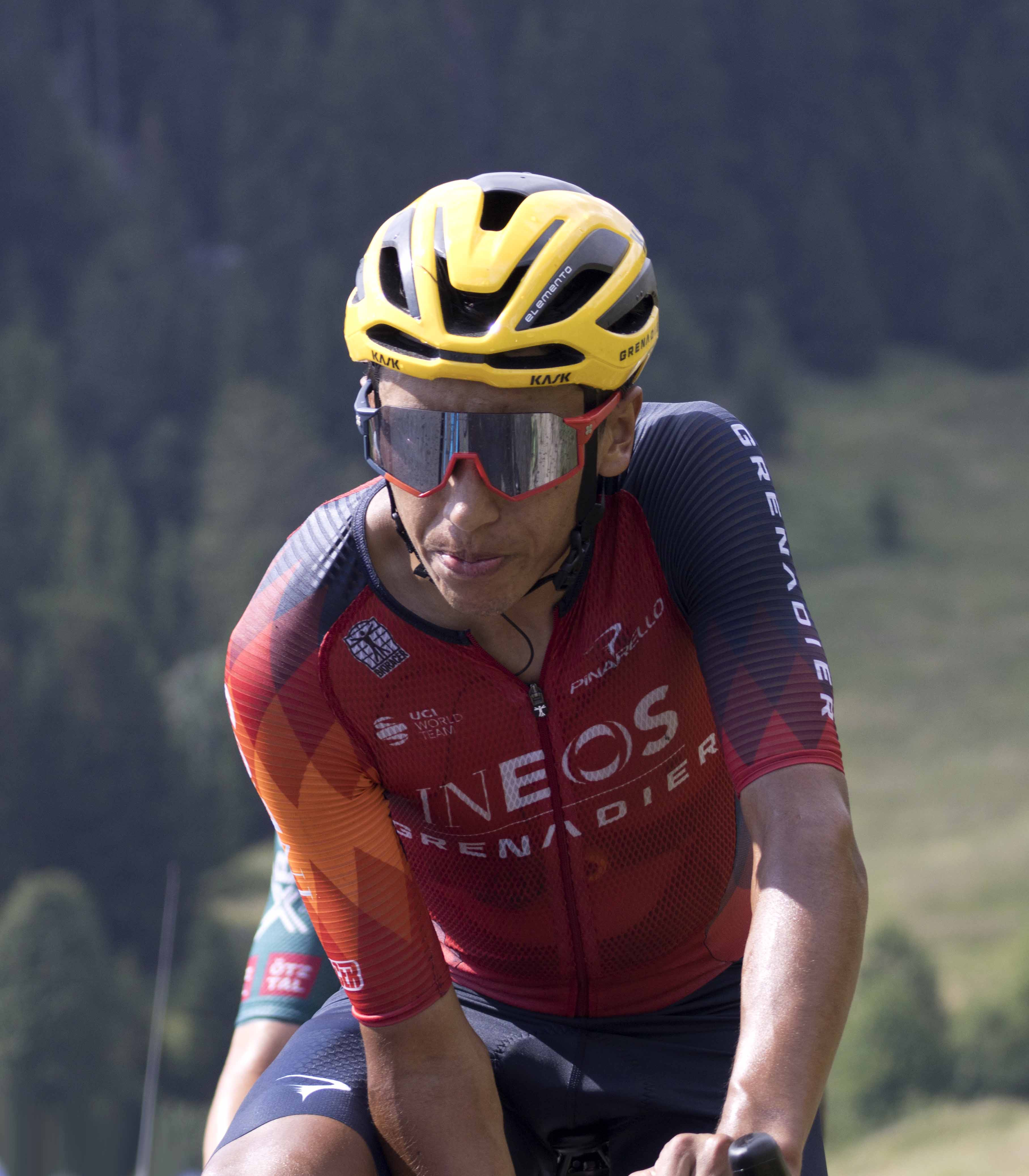
Bernal at the 2023 Tour de France

Bernal signed a five-year contract extension with Ineos in January 2022, announcing his goal for the year was to win the 2022 Tour de France. Days later, on a training ride in Gachancipá with Ineos Grenadiers teammates on 24 January, Bernal hit the back of a stopped passenger bus at a speed of about 50 kilometres per hour (31 mph). Bernal was on his time-trial bike and had not been attentive to the stopped bus according to the transit police. Ineos team later released a statement stating Bernal had sustained "[...]a fractured vertebrae [sic], a fractured right femur, a fractured right patella, chest trauma, a punctured lung and several rib fractures". Bernal was taken to Clinica Universidad de La Sabana in Bogotá for treatment. In total, doctors counted 20 separate fractures and initially warned there was a 95% chance Bernal would die or be paralyzed. He underwent two surgeries, both of which were successful in the immediate sense; the long term impacts were less certain. By 25 January he was stabilized, although still in intensive care as the doctors moved to treating less serious injuries.

He began to recover quickly, and by early March was sharing his progress with friends, family and fans on social media. His coach, Xabier Artexte, did not rule out a return to cycling by the end of the 2022 season.

There was a rumor that Bernal would possibly make his return at the 2022 Vuelta a España, however Vuelta Director Javier Guillén stated this was not true. Instead Bernal was intending to ride in the 2022 Vuelta a Burgos. The plan was changed again with his new return being the Danmark Rundt.

=== 2023–present ===
Bernal finished 8th at the 2023 Tour de Romandie. He also rode in the 2023 Tour de France and the 2023 Vuelta a España. In 2024, he finished fourth at the Volta a Catalunya. In 2025, he finished seventh at the Giro d'Italia, his first top-ten finish in a Grand Tour since 2022. He rode the 2025 Vuelta a España, where he won the sixteenth stage. He finished eighth in that season's Il Lombardia, his first monument top-ten since he finished third at the same race in 2019. He finished 20th at the 2026 Tour de France.

== Major results ==
=== Road ===
2016
1st Overall Tour of Bihor

1st Young rider classification
1st Stage 1

1st Young rider classification, Giro del Trentino
1st Young rider classification, Settimana Internazionale di Coppi e Bartali
4th Overall Tour of Slovenia

1st Young rider classification

4th Overall Tour de l'Avenir
2017 (3 pro wins)
1st Overall Sibiu Cycling Tour

1st Points classification
1st Young rider classification
1st Stages 2 & 3

1st Overall Tour de Savoie Mont Blanc

1st Points classification
1st Young rider classification
1st Stages 2 & 4 (ITT)

1st Overall Tour de l'Avenir

1st Stages 7 & 8

2nd Giro dell'Appennino
3rd Memorial Marco Pantani
4th Overall Settimana Internazionale di Coppi e Bartali

1st Young rider classification

5th Overall Giro della Toscana

1st Young rider classification

5th GP Industria & Artigianato di Larciano
7th Overall Tour de Langkawi
9th Overall Tour of the Alps

1st Young rider classification

9th Overall Vuelta a San Juan

1st Young rider classification

2018 (6)
1st Time trial, National Championships
1st Overall Tour of California

1st Young rider classification
1st Stages 2 & 6

1st Overall Colombia Oro y Paz

1st Mountains classification
1st Young rider classification

2nd Overall Tour de Romandie

1st Young rider classification
1st Stage 3 (ITT)

6th Overall Tour Down Under

1st Young rider classification

10th Milano–Torino
2019 (5)
1st Overall Tour de France

1st Young rider classification

1st Overall Tour de Suisse

1st Young rider classification
1st Stage 7

1st Overall Paris–Nice

1st Young rider classification

1st Gran Piemonte
2nd Giro della Toscana
3rd Time trial, National Championships
3rd Overall Volta a Catalunya
3rd Giro di Lombardia
4th Overall Tour Colombia
6th Milano–Torino
9th Giro dell'Emilia
2020 (2)
1st Overall Route d'Occitanie

1st Points classification
1st Young rider classification
1st Stage 3

National Championships

2nd Road race
3rd Time trial

2nd Overall Tour de l'Ain
4th Overall Tour Colombia
Tour de France

Held after Stages 7–12

2021 (3)
1st Overall Giro d'Italia

1st Young rider classification
1st Stages 9 & 16

2nd Trofeo Laigueglia
3rd Overall Tour de la Provence
3rd Strade Bianche
4th Overall Tirreno–Adriatico
6th Overall Vuelta a España

Held after Stages 3–19
Combativity award Stage 17

2023
8th Overall Tour de Romandie
8th Overall Tour de Hongrie
2024
3rd Road race, National Championships
3rd Overall Volta a Catalunya
3rd Overall O Gran Camiño
4th Overall Tour de Suisse
5th Overall Tour Colombia
7th Overall Paris–Nice
10th Overall Tour de Romandie
2025 (3)
National Championships

1st Road race
1st Time trial

1st Stage 16 Vuelta a España
4th Giro dell'Emilia
6th Overall Vuelta a Burgos
7th Overall Giro d'Italia
7th Overall Volta a Catalunya
8th Giro di Lombardia
9th Gran Piemonte
2026 (1)
National Championships

1st Road race
5th Time trial

2nd Overall Tour of the Alps
5th Liège–Bastogne–Liège
7th Ardèche Classic
10th Overall Giro d'Italia
Tour de France

Held after Stage 1

==== General classification results timeline ====
Grand Tour general classification
Grand Tour	2017	2018	2019	2020	2021	2022	2023	2024	2025	2026
Giro d'Italia	—	—	—	—	1	—	—	—	7	10
Tour de France	—	15	1	DNF	—	—	36	29	—	20
Vuelta a España	—	—	—	—	6	—	55	—	17	
Major stage race general classification
Major stage race	2017	2018	2019	2020	2021	2022	2023	2024	2025	2026
Paris–Nice	—	—	1	—	—	—	—	7	—	—
Tirreno–Adriatico	16	—	—	—	4	—	—	—	—	—
Volta a Catalunya	—	DNF	3	NH	—	—	DNF	3	7	—
Tour of the Basque Country	—	—	—	NH	—	—	92	—	—	—
Tour de Romandie	—	2	—	NH	—	—	8	10	—	—
Critérium du Dauphiné	—	—	—	DNF	—	—	12	—	—	—
Tour de Suisse	—	—	1	NH	—	—	—	4	—	—

==== Classics results timeline ====
Monument	2016	2017	2018	2019	2020	2021	2022	2023	2024	2025	2026
Milan–San Remo	—	—	—	—	—	—	—	—	—	—	—
Tour of Flanders	—	—	—	—	—	—	—	—	—	—	—
Paris–Roubaix	—	—	—	—	NH	—	—	—	—	—	—
Liège–Bastogne–Liège	—	—	—	—	—	—	—	—	21	—	5
Giro di Lombardia	—	13	12	3	—	—	—	—	—	8	
Classic	2016	2017	2018	2019	2020	2021	2022	2023	2024	2025	2026
Strade Bianche	—	—	—	—	—	3	—	—	—	—	—
Trofeo Laigueglia	—	—	—	—	—	2	—	—	—	—	—
Milano–Torino	—	16	10	6	—	—	—	—	—	—	—
Clásica de San Sebastián	—	—	DNF	DNF	NH	16	—	—	—	—	
Giro dell'Emilia	DNF	20	23	9	—	—	—	—	—	4	
Gran Piemonte	—	—	DNF	1	—	—	—	—	—	9	

Legend
—	Did not compete
DNF	Did not finish
NH	Not held
IP	In Progress

=== Mountain bike ===
2014
2nd Cross-country, UCI World Junior Championships
3rd Cross-country, Pan American Junior Championships
2015
1st Cross-country, Pan American Junior Championships
3rd Cross-country, UCI World Junior Championships
