= List of rosters for Sky Professional Cycling and its successors =

The List of Ineos Grenadiers riders contains riders from the team which have had the names Sky Professional Cycling, Sky Procycling, Team Sky, Team Ineos and presently, Netcompany–Ineos.

== 2010 (Sky Professional Cycling) ==
Ages as of 1 January 2010.

Rider	Date of birth
Kurt Asle Arvesen (NOR)	9 February 1976 (aged 33)
John-Lee Augustyn (RSA)	10 August 1986 (aged 23)
Michael Barry (CAN)	18 December 1975 (aged 34)
Edvald Boasson Hagen (NOR)	17 May 1987 (aged 22)
Sylvain Calzati (FRA)	26 December 1979 (aged 30)
Kjell Carlström (FIN)	18 October 1976 (aged 33)
Dario Cioni (ITA)	2 December 1974 (aged 35)
Steve Cummings (GBR)	19 March 1981 (aged 28)
Russell Downing (GBR)	23 August 1978 (aged 31)
Juan Antonio Flecha (ESP)	17 September 1977 (aged 32)
Chris Froome (GBR)	20 May 1985 (aged 24)
Simon Gerrans (AUS)	16 May 1980 (aged 29)
Mathew Hayman (AUS)	20 April 1978 (aged 31)

Rider	Date of birth
Greg Henderson (NZL)	9 October 1976 (aged 33)
Peter Kennaugh (GBR)	15 June 1989 (aged 20)
Thomas Lövkvist (SWE)	4 April 1984 (aged 25)
Lars Petter Nordhaug (NOR)	14 May 1984 (aged 25)
Serge Pauwels (BEL)	21 November 1983 (aged 26)
Nicolas Portal (FRA)	23 April 1979 (aged 30)
Morris Possoni (ITA)	1 July 1984 (aged 25)
Ian Stannard (GBR)	25 May 1987 (aged 22)
Christopher Sutton (AUS)	10 September 1984 (aged 25)
Ben Swift (GBR)	5 November 1987 (aged 22)
Geraint Thomas (GBR)	25 May 1986 (aged 23)
Davide Viganò (ITA)	12 June 1984 (aged 25)
Bradley Wiggins (GBR)	28 April 1980 (aged 29)

== 2011 (Sky Procycling) ==
Ages as of 1 January 2011.

Rider	Date of birth
Davide Appollonio (ITA)	2 June 1989 (aged 21)
Kurt Asle Arvesen (NOR)	9 February 1975 (aged 35)
John-Lee Augustyn (RSA)	10 August 1986 (aged 24)
Michael Barry (CAN)	18 December 1975 (aged 35)
Edvald Boasson Hagen (NOR)	17 May 1987 (aged 23)
Kjell Carlström (FIN)	18 October 1976 (aged 34)
Dario Cioni (ITA)	2 December 1974 (aged 36)
Steve Cummings (GBR)	19 March 1981 (aged 29)
Russell Downing (GBR)	23 August 1978 (aged 32)
Alex Dowsett (GBR)	3 October 1988 (aged 22)
Juan Antonio Flecha (ESP)	17 September 1977 (aged 33)
Chris Froome (GBR)	20 May 1985 (aged 25)
Simon Gerrans (AUS)	16 May 1980 (aged 30)
Mathew Hayman (AUS)	20 April 1978 (aged 32)
Greg Henderson (NZL)	9 October 1976 (aged 34)

Rider	Date of birth
Jeremy Hunt (GBR)	12 March 1974 (aged 36)
Peter Kennaugh (GBR)	15 June 1989 (aged 21)
Christian Knees (GER)	5 March 1981 (aged 29)
Thomas Löfkvist (SWE)	4 April 1984 (aged 26)
Lars Petter Nordhaug (NOR)	14 May 1984 (aged 26)
Serge Pauwels (BEL)	21 November 1983 (aged 27)
Morris Possoni (ITA)	1 July 1984 (aged 26)
Michael Rogers (AUS)	20 December 1979 (aged 31)
Ian Stannard (GBR)	25 May 1987 (aged 23)
Chris Sutton (AUS)	10 September 1984 (aged 26)
Ben Swift (GBR)	5 November 1987 (aged 23)
Geraint Thomas (GBR)	25 May 1986 (aged 24)
Rigoberto Urán (COL)	26 January 1987 (aged 23)
Bradley Wiggins (GBR)	28 April 1980 (aged 30)
Xabier Zandio (ESP)	17 March 1977 (aged 33)

== 2012 (Sky Procycling) ==
Ages as of 1 January 2012.

Rider	Date of birth
Davide Appollonio (ITA)	2 June 1989 (aged 22)
Michael Barry (CAN)	18 December 1975 (aged 36)
Edvald Boasson Hagen (NOR)	17 May 1987 (aged 24)
Mark Cavendish (GBR)	21 May 1985 (aged 26)
Alex Dowsett (GBR)	3 October 1988 (aged 23)
Bernhard Eisel (AUT)	17 February 1981 (aged 30)
Juan Antonio Flecha (ESP)	17 September 1977 (aged 34)
Chris Froome (GBR)	20 May 1985 (aged 26)
Mathew Hayman (AUS)	20 April 1978 (aged 33)
Sergio Henao (COL)	10 December 1987 (aged 24)
Jeremy Hunt (GBR)	12 March 1974 (aged 37)
Peter Kennaugh (GBR)	15 June 1989 (aged 22)
Christian Knees (GER)	5 March 1981 (aged 30)
Thomas Lövkvist (SWE)	4 April 1984 (aged 27)
Davide Martinelli (Note: Martinelli joined the team on 1 August, as a stagiaire, from Team Hopplà Wega Truck Italia Valdarno.) (ITA)	31 May 1993 (aged 18)

Rider	Date of birth
Lars Petter Nordhaug (NOR)	14 May 1984 (aged 27)
Danny Pate (USA)	23 March 1979 (aged 32)
Richie Porte (AUS)	30 January 1985 (aged 26)
Salvatore Puccio (ITA)	31 August 1989 (aged 22)
Michael Rogers (AUS)	20 December 1979 (aged 32)
Luke Rowe (GBR)	10 March 1990 (aged 21)
Kanstantsin Siutsou (BLR)	9 August 1982 (aged 29)
Ian Stannard (GBR)	25 May 1987 (aged 24)
Chris Sutton (AUS)	10 September 1984 (aged 27)
Ben Swift (GBR)	5 November 1987 (aged 24)
Geraint Thomas (GBR)	25 May 1986 (aged 25)
Rigoberto Urán (COL)	26 January 1987 (aged 24)
Bradley Wiggins (GBR)	28 April 1980 (aged 31)
Xabier Zandio (ESP)	17 March 1977 (aged 34)

== 2013 (Sky Procycling) ==
As of 1 January 2013.

Rider	Date of birth
Edvald Boasson Hagen (NOR)	17 May 1987 (age 39)
Ian Boswell (USA)	7 February 1991 (age 35)
Dario Cataldo (ITA)	17 March 1985 (age 41)
Joe Dombrowski (USA)	12 May 1991 (age 35)
Josh Edmondson (GBR)	6 July 1992 (age 34)
Bernhard Eisel (AUT)	17 February 1981 (age 45)
Chris Froome (GBR)	20 May 1985 (age 41)
Mathew Hayman (AUS)	20 April 1978 (age 48)
Sergio Henao (COL)	10 December 1987 (age 38)
Peter Kennaugh (GBR)	15 June 1989 (age 37)
Vasil Kiryienka (BLR)	28 June 1981 (age 45)
Christian Knees (GER)	5 March 1981 (age 45)
David López (ESP)	13 May 1981 (age 45)
Danny Pate (USA)	23 March 1979 (age 47)

Rider	Date of birth
Richie Porte (AUS)	30 January 1985 (age 41)
Salvatore Puccio (ITA)	31 August 1989 (age 36)
Gabriel Rasch (NOR)	8 April 1976 (age 50)
Luke Rowe (GBR)	10 March 1990 (age 36)
Kanstantsin Sivtsov (BLR)	9 August 1982 (age 44)
Ian Stannard (GBR)	25 May 1987 (age 39)
Chris Sutton (AUS)	10 September 1984 (age 41)
Ben Swift (GBR)	5 November 1987 (age 38)
Geraint Thomas (GBR)	25 May 1986 (age 40)
Jonathan Tiernan-Locke (GBR)	26 December 1984 (age 41)
Rigoberto Urán (COL)	26 January 1987 (age 39)
Bradley Wiggins (GBR)	28 April 1980 (age 46)
Xabier Zandio (ESP)	17 March 1977 (age 49)

== 2014 (Team Sky) ==
As of 14 April 2014.

Rider	Date of birth
Edvald Boasson Hagen (NOR)	17 May 1987 (aged 26)
Ian Boswell (USA)	7 February 1991 (aged 22)
Dario Cataldo (ITA)	17 March 1985 (aged 28)
Philip Deignan (IRL)	7 September 1983 (aged 30)
Joe Dombrowski (USA)	12 May 1991 (aged 22)
Nathan Earle (AUS)	4 June 1988 (aged 25)
Josh Edmondson (GBR)	6 July 1992 (aged 21)
Bernhard Eisel (AUT)	17 February 1981 (aged 32)
Chris Froome (GBR)	20 May 1985 (aged 28)
Sebastián Henao (COL)	5 August 1993 (aged 20)
Sergio Henao (COL)	10 December 1987 (aged 26)
Peter Kennaugh (GBR)	15 June 1989 (aged 24)
Vasil Kiryienka (BLR)	28 June 1981 (aged 32)
Christian Knees (GER)	5 March 1981 (aged 32)
David López (ESP)	13 May 1981 (aged 32)

Rider	Date of birth
Mikel Nieve (ESP)	26 May 1984 (aged 29)
Danny Pate (USA)	23 March 1979 (aged 34)
Richie Porte (AUS)	30 January 1985 (aged 28)
Salvatore Puccio (ITA)	31 August 1989 (aged 24)
Gabriel Rasch (Note: Rasch retired from the sport on 13 April, after completing Paris–Roubaix.) (NOR)	8 April 1976 (aged 37)
Luke Rowe (GBR)	10 March 1990 (aged 23)
Kanstantsin Sivtsov (BLR)	9 August 1982 (aged 31)
Ian Stannard (GBR)	25 May 1987 (aged 26)
Chris Sutton (AUS)	10 September 1984 (aged 29)
Ben Swift (GBR)	5 November 1987 (aged 26)
Geraint Thomas (GBR)	25 May 1986 (aged 27)
Jonathan Tiernan-Locke (Note: Tiernan-Locke was sacked by the team on 17 July, following his two-year suspension for biological passport irregularities.) (GBR)	26 December 1984 (aged 29)
Bradley Wiggins (GBR)	28 April 1980 (aged 33)
Xabier Zandio (ESP)	17 March 1977 (aged 36)

== 2015 (Team Sky) ==
As of 19 August 2015.

Rider	Date of birth
Ian Boswell (USA)	7 February 1991 (aged 24)
Philip Deignan (IRL)	7 September 1983 (aged 31)
Nathan Earle (AUS)	4 June 1988 (aged 27)
Bernhard Eisel (AUT)	17 February 1981 (aged 34)
Andrew Fenn (GBR)	1 July 1990 (aged 25)
Chris Froome (GBR)	20 May 1985 (aged 30)
Tao Geoghegan Hart (Note: Geoghegan Hart joined the team on 1 August as a stagiaire, from Axeon Cycling Team) (GBR)	30 March 1995 (aged 20)
Sebastián Henao (COL)	5 August 1993 (aged 22)
Sergio Henao (COL)	10 December 1987 (aged 27)
Peter Kennaugh (GBR)	15 June 1989 (aged 26)
Vasil Kiryienka (BLR)	28 June 1981 (aged 34)
Christian Knees (GER)	5 March 1981 (aged 34)
Leopold König (CZE)	15 November 1987 (aged 27)
David López (ESP)	13 May 1981 (aged 34)
Mikel Nieve (ESP)	26 May 1984 (aged 31)
Lars Petter Nordhaug (NOR)	14 May 1984 (aged 31)

Rider	Date of birth
Danny Pate (USA)	23 March 1979 (aged 36)
Alex Peters (Note: Peters joined the team on 1 August as a stagiaire, from SEG Racing) (GBR)	31 March 1994 (aged 21)
Wout Poels (NED)	1 October 1987 (aged 27)
Richie Porte (AUS)	30 January 1985 (aged 30)
Salvatore Puccio (ITA)	31 August 1989 (aged 25)
Nicolas Roche (IRL)	3 July 1984 (aged 31)
Luke Rowe (GBR)	10 March 1990 (aged 25)
Kanstantsin Sivtsov (BLR)	9 August 1982 (aged 32)
Ian Stannard (GBR)	25 May 1987 (aged 28)
Chris Sutton (AUS)	10 September 1984 (aged 30)
Ben Swift (GBR)	5 November 1987 (aged 27)
Geraint Thomas (GBR)	25 May 1986 (aged 29)
Bradley Wiggins (Note: Wiggins left the team to join the new WIGGINS squad after the 2015 Paris-Roubaix in April.) (GBR)	28 April 1980 (aged 35)
Elia Viviani (ITA)	7 February 1989 (aged 26)
Xabier Zandio (ESP)	17 March 1977 (aged 38)

== 2016 (Team Sky) ==
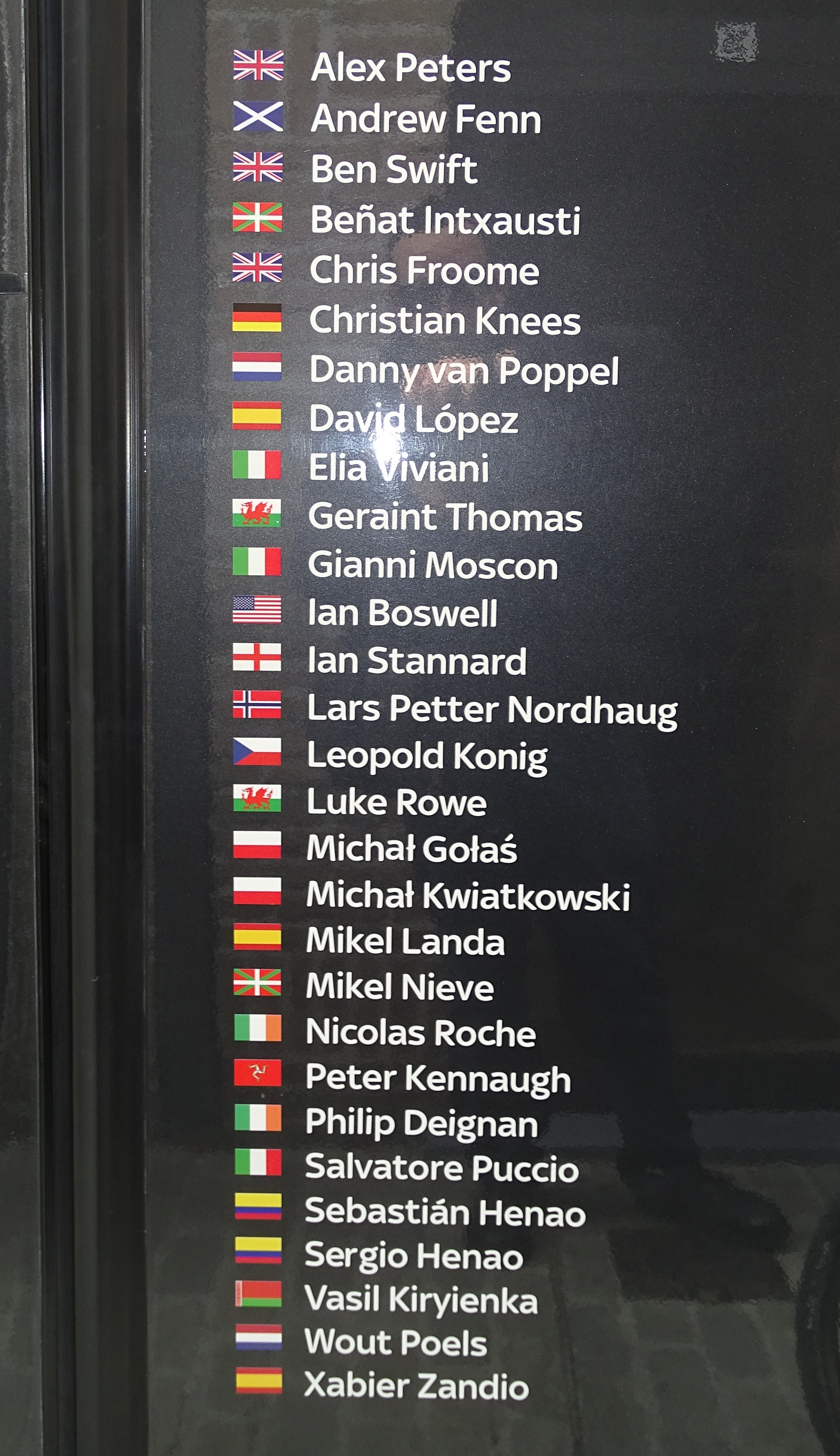
The 2016 team, as displayed on one of the team buses

As of 9 August 2016.

Rider	Date of birth
Ian Boswell (USA)	7 February 1991 (aged 25)
Philip Deignan (IRL)	7 September 1983 (aged 32)
Owain Doull (Note: Doull joined the team on 1 August as a stagiaire, from WIGGINS.) (GBR)	17 October 1995 (aged 20)
Andrew Fenn (GBR)	1 July 1990 (aged 26)
Chris Froome (GBR)	20 May 1985 (aged 31)
Michał Gołaś (POL)	29 April 1984 (aged 32)
Sebastián Henao (COL)	5 August 1993 (aged 23)
Sergio Henao (COL)	10 December 1987 (aged 28)
Beñat Intxausti (ESP)	20 March 1986 (aged 30)
Peter Kennaugh (GBR)	15 June 1989 (aged 27)
Vasil Kiryienka (BLR)	28 June 1981 (aged 35)
Christian Knees (GER)	5 March 1981 (aged 35)
Michał Kwiatkowski (POL)	2 June 1990 (aged 26)
Mikel Landa (ESP)	3 December 1989 (aged 26)
Leopold König (CZE)	15 November 1987 (aged 28)

Rider	Date of birth
David López (ESP)	13 May 1981 (aged 35)
Gianni Moscon (ITA)	20 April 1994 (aged 22)
Mikel Nieve (ESP)	26 May 1984 (aged 32)
Lars Petter Nordhaug (NOR)	14 May 1984 (aged 32)
Alex Peters (GBR)	31 March 1994 (aged 22)
Wout Poels (NED)	1 October 1987 (aged 28)
Salvatore Puccio (ITA)	31 August 1989 (aged 26)
Nicolas Roche (IRL)	3 July 1984 (aged 32)
Luke Rowe (GBR)	10 March 1990 (aged 26)
Ian Stannard (GBR)	25 May 1987 (aged 29)
Ben Swift (GBR)	5 November 1987 (aged 28)
Geraint Thomas (GBR)	25 May 1986 (aged 30)
Danny van Poppel (NED)	26 July 1993 (aged 23)
Elia Viviani (ITA)	7 February 1989 (aged 27)
Xabier Zandio (ESP)	17 March 1977 (aged 39)

== 2017 (Team Sky) ==
As of 17 March 2017.

Rider	Date of birth
Ian Boswell (USA)	7 February 1991 (aged 26)
Philip Deignan (IRL)	7 September 1983 (aged 33)
Jonathan Dibben (GBR)	12 February 1994 (aged 23)
Owain Doull (GBR)	2 May 1993 (aged 23)
Kenny Elissonde (FRA)	22 July 1991 (aged 25)
Chris Froome (GBR)	20 May 1985 (aged 31)
Tao Geoghegan Hart (GBR)	30 March 1995 (aged 21)
Michał Gołaś (POL)	29 April 1984 (aged 32)
Sebastián Henao (COL)	5 August 1993 (aged 23)
Sergio Henao (COL)	10 December 1987 (aged 29)
Beñat Intxausti (ESP)	20 March 1986 (aged 30)
Peter Kennaugh (GBR)	15 June 1989 (aged 27)
Vasil Kiryienka (BLR)	28 June 1981 (aged 35)
Christian Knees (GER)	5 March 1981 (aged 36)

Rider	Date of birth
Michał Kwiatkowski (POL)	2 June 1990 (aged 26)
Mikel Landa (ESP)	3 December 1989 (aged 27)
David López (ESP)	13 May 1981 (aged 35)
Gianni Moscon (ITA)	20 April 1994 (aged 22)
Mikel Nieve (ESP)	26 May 1984 (aged 32)
Wout Poels (NED)	1 October 1987 (aged 29)
Salvatore Puccio (ITA)	31 August 1989 (aged 27)
Diego Rosa (ITA)	27 March 1989 (aged 27)
Luke Rowe (GBR)	10 March 1990 (aged 27)
Ian Stannard (GBR)	25 May 1987 (aged 29)
Geraint Thomas (GBR)	25 May 1986 (aged 30)
Danny van Poppel (NED)	26 July 1993 (aged 23)
Elia Viviani (ITA)	7 February 1989 (aged 28)
Łukasz Wiśniowski (POL)	7 December 1991 (aged 25)

== 2018 (Team Sky) ==
As of 21 October 2018.

Rider	Date of birth
Leonardo Basso (ITA)	25 December 1993 (aged 24)
Egan Bernal (COL)	13 January 1997 (aged 21)
Jonathan Castroviejo (ESP)	27 April 1987 (aged 31)
David de la Cruz (ESP)	6 May 1989 (aged 29)
Philip Deignan (IRL)	7 September 1983 (aged 35)
Jonathan Dibben (GBR)	12 February 1994 (aged 24)
Mark Donovan (Note: Donovan joined the team on 1 August, as a stagiaire, from Team Wiggins) (GBR)	3 April 1999 (aged 19)
Owain Doull (GBR)	2 May 1993 (aged 25)
Eddie Dunbar (Note: Dunbar joined the team on 15 September, from Aqua Blue Sport) (IRL)	1 September 1996 (aged 22)
Kenny Elissonde (FRA)	22 July 1991 (aged 27)
Chris Froome (GBR)	20 May 1985 (aged 33)
Tao Geoghegan Hart (GBR)	30 March 1995 (aged 23)
Michał Gołaś (POL)	29 April 1984 (aged 34)
Kristoffer Halvorsen (NOR)	13 April 1996 (aged 22)
Ethan Hayter (Note: Hayter joined the team on 1 August, as a stagiaire) (GBR)	18 September 1998 (aged 20)
Sebastián Henao (COL)	5 August 1993 (aged 25)
Sergio Henao (COL)	10 December 1987 (aged 30)

Rider	Date of birth
Beñat Intxausti (ESP)	20 March 1986 (aged 32)
Vasil Kiryienka (BLR)	28 June 1981 (aged 37)
Christian Knees (GER)	5 March 1981 (aged 37)
Michał Kwiatkowski (POL)	2 June 1990 (aged 28)
Chris Lawless (GBR)	4 November 1995 (aged 22)
David López (ESP)	13 May 1981 (aged 37)
Gianni Moscon (ITA)	20 April 1994 (aged 24)
Wout Poels (NED)	1 October 1987 (aged 31)
Salvatore Puccio (ITA)	31 August 1989 (aged 29)
Diego Rosa (ITA)	27 March 1989 (aged 29)
Luke Rowe (GBR)	10 March 1990 (aged 28)
Pavel Sivakov (RUS)	11 July 1997 (aged 21)
Ian Stannard (GBR)	25 May 1987 (aged 31)
Geraint Thomas (GBR)	25 May 1986 (aged 32)
Dylan van Baarle (NED)	21 May 1992 (aged 26)
Łukasz Wiśniowski (POL)	7 December 1991 (aged 26)

== 2019 (Team Sky/Team Ineos) ==
As of 1 January 2019.

Rider	Date of birth
Leonardo Basso (ITA)	25 December 1993 (aged 25)
Egan Bernal (COL)	13 January 1997 (aged 21)
Jonathan Castroviejo (ESP)	27 April 1987 (aged 31)
David de la Cruz (ESP)	6 May 1989 (aged 29)
Owain Doull (GBR)	2 May 1993 (aged 25)
Eddie Dunbar (IRL)	1 September 1996 (aged 22)
Kenny Elissonde (FRA)	22 July 1991 (aged 27)
Chris Froome (GBR)	20 May 1985 (aged 33)
Filippo Ganna (ITA)	25 July 1996 (aged 22)
Tao Geoghegan Hart (GBR)	30 March 1995 (aged 23)
Michał Gołaś (POL)	29 April 1984 (aged 34)
Kristoffer Halvorsen (NOR)	13 April 1996 (aged 22)
Sebastián Henao (COL)	5 August 1993 (aged 25)
Vasil Kiryienka (BLR)	28 June 1981 (aged 37)
Christian Knees (GER)	5 March 1981 (aged 37)

Rider	Date of birth
Michał Kwiatkowski (POL)	2 June 1990 (aged 28)
Chris Lawless (GBR)	4 November 1995 (aged 23)
Gianni Moscon (ITA)	20 April 1994 (aged 24)
Jhonatan Narváez (ECU)	4 March 1997 (aged 21)
Wout Poels (NED)	1 October 1987 (aged 31)
Salvatore Puccio (ITA)	31 August 1989 (aged 29)
Diego Rosa (ITA)	27 March 1989 (aged 29)
Luke Rowe (GBR)	10 March 1990 (aged 28)
Pavel Sivakov (RUS)	11 July 1997 (aged 21)
Iván Sosa (COL)	31 October 1997 (aged 21)
Ian Stannard (GBR)	25 May 1987 (aged 31)
Ben Swift (GBR)	5 November 1987 (aged 31)
Geraint Thomas (GBR)	25 May 1986 (aged 32)
Dylan van Baarle (NED)	21 May 1992 (aged 26)

== 2020 (Team Ineos/Ineos Grenadiers) ==
As of 2 February 2020.

Rider	Date of birth
Leonardo Basso (ITA)	25 December 1993 (aged 26)
Egan Bernal (COL)	13 January 1997 (aged 22)
Richard Carapaz (ECU)	29 May 1993 (aged 26)
Jonathan Castroviejo (ESP)	27 April 1987 (aged 32)
Rohan Dennis (AUS)	28 May 1990 (aged 29)
Owain Doull (GBR)	2 May 1993 (aged 26)
Eddie Dunbar (IRL)	1 September 1996 (aged 23)
Chris Froome (GBR)	20 May 1985 (aged 34)
Filippo Ganna (ITA)	25 July 1996 (aged 23)
Tao Geoghegan Hart (GBR)	30 March 1995 (aged 24)
Michał Gołaś (POL)	29 April 1984 (aged 35)
Ethan Hayter (GBR)	18 September 1998 (aged 21)
Sebastián Henao (COL)	5 August 1993 (aged 26)
Vasil Kiryienka (Note: Kiryienka retired from the sport on 30 January.) (BLR)	28 June 1981 (aged 38)
Christian Knees (GER)	5 March 1981 (aged 38)

Rider	Date of birth
Michał Kwiatkowski (POL)	2 June 1990 (aged 29)
Chris Lawless (GBR)	4 November 1995 (aged 24)
Gianni Moscon (ITA)	20 April 1994 (aged 25)
Jhonatan Narváez (ECU)	4 March 1997 (aged 22)
Salvatore Puccio (ITA)	31 August 1989 (aged 30)
Brandon Rivera (COL)	21 March 1996 (aged 23)
Carlos Rodriguez (ESP)	2 February 2001 (aged 18)
Luke Rowe (GBR)	10 March 1990 (aged 29)
Pavel Sivakov (RUS)	11 July 1997 (aged 22)
Iván Sosa (COL)	31 October 1997 (aged 22)
Ian Stannard (GBR)	25 May 1987 (aged 32)
Ben Swift (GBR)	5 November 1987 (aged 32)
Geraint Thomas (GBR)	25 May 1986 (aged 33)
Dylan van Baarle (NED)	21 May 1992 (aged 27)
Cameron Wurf (Note: Wurf joined the team on 31 January.) (AUS)	3 August 1983 (aged 36)

== 2021 (Ineos Grenadiers) ==
As of 1 February 2021.

Rider	Date of birth
Andrey Amador (CRC)	29 August 1986 (aged 34)
Leonardo Basso (ITA)	25 December 1993 (aged 27)
Egan Bernal (COL)	13 January 1997 (aged 23)
Richard Carapaz (ECU)	29 May 1993 (aged 27)
Jonathan Castroviejo (ESP)	27 April 1987 (aged 33)
Laurens De Plus (BEL)	4 September 1995 (aged 25)
Rohan Dennis (AUS)	28 May 1990 (aged 30)
Owain Doull (GBR)	2 May 1993 (aged 27)
Eddie Dunbar (IRL)	1 September 1996 (aged 24)
Filippo Ganna (ITA)	25 July 1996 (aged 24)
Tao Geoghegan Hart (GBR)	30 March 1995 (aged 25)
Michał Gołaś (POL)	29 April 1984 (aged 36)
Ethan Hayter (GBR)	18 September 1998 (aged 22)
Sebastián Henao (COL)	5 August 1993 (aged 27)
Michał Kwiatkowski (POL)	2 June 1990 (aged 30)
Daniel Martínez (COL)	April 25, 1996 (aged 24)

Rider	Date of birth
Gianni Moscon (ITA)	20 April 1994 (aged 26)
Jhonatan Narváez (ECU)	4 March 1997 (aged 23)
Tom Pidcock (GBR)	30 July 1999 (aged 21)
Richie Porte (AUS)	30 January 1985 (aged 35)
Salvatore Puccio (ITA)	31 August 1989 (aged 31)
Brandon Rivera (COL)	21 March 1996 (aged 24)
Carlos Rodriguez (ESP)	2 February 2001 (aged 19)
Luke Rowe (GBR)	10 March 1990 (aged 30)
Pavel Sivakov (RUS)	11 July 1997 (aged 23)
Iván Sosa (COL)	31 October 1997 (aged 23)
Ben Swift (GBR)	5 November 1987 (aged 33)
Geraint Thomas (GBR)	25 May 1986 (aged 34)
Dylan van Baarle (NED)	21 May 1992 (aged 28)
Cameron Wurf (AUS)	3 August 1983 (aged 37)
Adam Yates (GBR)	7 August 1992 (aged 28)

== 2022 (Ineos Grenadiers) ==
As of 3 January 2022

Rider	Date of birth
Andrey Amador (CRC)	29 August 1986 (aged 35)
Egan Bernal (COL)	13 January 1997 (aged 24)
Richard Carapaz (ECU)	29 May 1993 (aged 28)
Jonathan Castroviejo (ESP)	27 April 1987 (aged 34)
Laurens De Plus (BEL)	4 September 1995 (aged 26)
Eddie Dunbar (IRL)	1 September 1996 (aged 25)
Omar Fraile (ESP)	17 July 1990 (aged 31)
Filippo Ganna (ITA)	25 July 1996 (aged 25)
Tao Geoghegan Hart (GBR)	30 March 1995 (aged 26)
Ethan Hayter (GBR)	18 September 1998 (aged 23)
Kim Heiduk (GER)	3 March 2000 (aged 21)
Michał Kwiatkowski (POL)	2 June 1990 (aged 31)
Daniel Martínez (COL)	April 25, 1996 (aged 25)
Jhonatan Narváez (ECU)	4 March 1997 (aged 24)
Tom Pidcock (GBR)	30 July 1999 (aged 22)
Luke Plapp (AUS)	25 December 2000 (aged 21)

Rider	Date of birth
Richie Porte (AUS)	30 January 1985 (aged 36)
Salvatore Puccio (ITA)	31 August 1989 (aged 32)
Brandon Rivera (COL)	21 March 1996 (aged 25)
Carlos Rodriguez (ESP)	2 February 2001 (aged 20)
Luke Rowe (GBR)	10 March 1990 (aged 31)
Magnus Sheffield (USA)	19 April 2002 (aged 19)
Pavel Sivakov (RUS)	11 July 1997 (aged 24)
Ben Swift (GBR)	5 November 1987 (aged 34)
Geraint Thomas (GBR)	25 May 1986 (aged 35)
Ben Tulett (GBR)	26 August 2001 (aged 20)
Ben Turner (GBR)	28 May 1999 (aged 22)
Dylan van Baarle (NED)	21 May 1992 (aged 29)
Elia Viviani (ITA)	7 February 1989 (aged 32)
Cameron Wurf (AUS)	3 August 1983 (aged 38)
Adam Yates (GBR)	7 August 1992 (aged 29)

== 2023 (Ineos Grenadiers) ==
As of 2 January 2023.

Rider	Date of birth
Thymen Arensman (NED)	4 December 1999 (age 26)
Egan Bernal (COL)	13 January 1997 (age 29)
Jonathan Castroviejo (ESP)	27 April 1987 (age 39)
Laurens De Plus (BEL)	4 September 1995 (age 30)
Omar Fraile (ESP)	17 July 1990 (age 36)
Filippo Ganna (ITA)	25 July 1996 (age 30)
Tao Geoghegan Hart (GBR)	30 March 1995 (age 31)
Ethan Hayter (GBR)	18 September 1998 (age 27)
Leo Hayter (GBR)	10 August 2001 (age 25)
Kim Heiduk (GER)	3 March 2000 (age 26)
Michał Kwiatkowski (POL)	2 June 1990 (age 36)
Michael Leonard (CAN)	26 March 2004 (age 22)
Daniel Martínez (COL)	25 April 1996 (age 30)
Jhonatan Narváez (ECU)	4 March 1997 (age 29)
Tom Pidcock (GBR)	30 July 1999 (age 27)

Rider	Date of birth
Luke Plapp (AUS)	25 December 2000 (age 25)
Salvatore Puccio (ITA)	31 August 1989 (age 36)
Brandon Rivera (COL)	21 March 1996 (age 30)
Carlos Rodriguez (ESP)	2 February 2001 (age 25)
Luke Rowe (WAL)	10 March 1990 (age 36)
Magnus Sheffield (USA)	19 April 2002 (age 24)
Pavel Sivakov (FRA)	11 July 1997 (age 29)
Ben Swift (GBR)	5 November 1987 (age 38)
Connor Swift (GBR)	30 October 1995 (age 30)
Joshua Tarling (WAL)	15 February 2004 (age 22)
Geraint Thomas (WAL)	25 May 1986 (age 40)
Ben Tulett (GBR)	26 August 2001 (age 24)
Ben Turner (GBR)	28 May 1999 (age 27)
Dylan van Baarle (NED)	21 May 1992 (age 34)
Cameron Wurf (AUS)	3 August 1983 (age 43)

== 2024 (Ineos Grenadiers) ==
As of 5 January 2024.

Rider	Date of birth
Thymen Arensman (NED)	4 December 1999 (age 26)
Andrew August (USA)	12 October 2005 (age 20)
Egan Bernal (COL)	13 January 1997 (age 29)
Jonathan Castroviejo (ESP)	27 April 1987 (age 39)
Laurens De Plus (BEL)	4 September 1995 (age 30)
Tobias Foss (NOR)	25 May 1997 (age 29)
Omar Fraile (ESP)	17 July 1990 (age 36)
Filippo Ganna (ITA)	25 July 1996 (age 30)
Ethan Hayter (GBR)	18 September 1998 (age 27)
Leo Hayter (GBR)	10 August 2001 (age 25)
Kim Heiduk (GER)	3 March 2000 (age 26)
Michał Kwiatkowski (POL)	2 June 1990 (age 36)
Michael Leonard (CAN)	26 March 2004 (age 22)
Jhonatan Narváez (ECU)	4 March 1997 (age 29)
Tom Pidcock (GBR)	30 July 1999 (age 27)

Rider	Date of birth
Salvatore Puccio (ITA)	31 August 1989 (age 36)
Brandon Rivera (COL)	21 March 1996 (age 30)
Carlos Rodriguez (ESP)	2 February 2001 (age 25)
Óscar Rodrígue (ESP)	6 May 1995 (age 31)
Luke Rowe (GBR)	10 March 1990 (age 36)
Magnus Sheffield (USA)	19 April 2002 (age 24)
Theodor Storm (DEN)	31 March 2005 (age 21)
Ben Swift (GBR)	5 November 1987 (age 38)
Connor Swift (GBR)	30 October 1995 (age 30)
Joshua Tarling (GBR)	15 February 2004 (age 22)
Geraint Thomas (GBR)	25 May 1986 (age 40)
Ben Turner (GBR)	28 May 1999 (age 27)
Elia Viviani (ITA)	7 February 1989 (age 37)
Cameron Wurf (AUS)	3 August 1983 (age 43)

== 2025 (Ineos Grenadiers) ==
As of 4 January 2025.

Rider	Date of birth
Thymen Arensman (NED)	4 December 1999 (age 26)
Andrew August (USA)	12 October 2005 (age 20)
Egan Bernal (COL)	13 January 1997 (age 29)
Jonathan Castroviejo (ESP)	27 April 1987 (age 39)
Laurens De Plus (BEL)	4 September 1995 (age 30)
Tobias Foss (NOR)	25 May 1997 (age 29)
Omar Fraile (ESP)	17 July 1990 (age 36)
Filippo Ganna (ITA)	25 July 1996 (age 30)
Lucas Hamilton (AUS)	12 February 1996 (age 30)
Kim Heiduk (GER)	3 March 2000 (age 26)
Bob Jungels (LUX)	22 September 1992 (age 33)
Michał Kwiatkowski (POL)	2 June 1990 (age 36)
Victor Langellotti (MON)	7 June 1995 (age 31)
Axel Laurance (FRA)	13 April 2001 (age 25)

Rider	Date of birth
Michael Leonard (CAN)	26 March 2004 (age 22)
Salvatore Puccio (ITA)	31 August 1989 (age 36)
Brandon Rivera (COL)	21 March 1996 (age 30)
Carlos Rodriguez (ESP)	2 February 2001 (age 25)
Óscar Rodríguez (ESP)	6 May 1995 (age 31)
Magnus Sheffield (USA)	19 April 2002 (age 24)
Artem Shmidt (USA)	30 January 2004 (age 22)
Ben Swift (GBR)	5 November 1987 (age 38)
Connor Swift (GBR)	30 October 1995 (age 30)
Joshua Tarling (GBR)	15 February 2004 (age 22)
Geraint Thomas (GBR)	25 May 1986 (age 40)
Ben Turner (GBR)	28 May 1999 (age 27)
Samuel Watson (GBR)	24 September 2001 (age 24)

== See also ==
- Team Sky
- List of wins by Sky Professional Racing and its successors
