= List of wins by Sky Professional Racing and its successors =

This is a comprehensive list of victories of the Netcompany INEOS cycling team. The races are categorized according to the UCI Continental Circuits rules.

== 2010 – Sky Professional Cycling ==
Overall Bay Cycling Classic, Greg Henderson

Stage 2, Chris Sutton

Cancer Council Helpline Classic, Greg Henderson
Stage 6 Tour Down Under, Chris Sutton
Stage 1 (TTT) Tour of Qatar (Note: The riders on the squad were Kurt Asle Arvesen, Edvald Boasson Hagen, Russell Downing, Juan Antonio Flecha, Lars Petter Nordhaug, Ian Stannard, Geraint Thomas and Bradley Wiggins)
Points classification Tour of Oman, Edvald Boasson Hagen

Young rider classification, Edvald Boasson Hagen
Stages 3 & 6, Edvald Boasson Hagen

Omloop Het Nieuwsblad, Juan Antonio Flecha
Stage 1 Paris–Nice, Greg Henderson
Stage 7 Tirreno–Adriatico, Edvald Boasson Hagen
Stage 2 Critérium International, Russell Downing
Stage 1 Giro d'Italia, Bradley Wiggins

Led General classification on Stage 1, Bradley Wiggins
Led Points classification on stage 1, Bradley Wiggins

Overall Tour de Picardie, Ben Swift

Points classification, Ben Swift
Teams classification (Note: The riders on the squad were Russell Downing, Juan Antonio Flecha, Peter Kennaugh, Lars Petter Nordhaug, Nicolas Portal, Ben Swift, Geraint Thomas and Davide Viganò)
Young rider classification, Ben Swift
Stage 2, Ben Swift

Stage 7 Critérium du Dauphiné, Edvald Boasson Hagen
Combativity award on Stage 13 Tour de France, Juan Antonio Flecha
Stage 3 Ster Elektrotoer, Greg Henderson
Norway National Time Trial, Edvald Boasson Hagen
United Kingdom National Road Race, Geraint Thomas
Stage 3 Brixia Tour, Chris Sutton
Overall Tour de Wallonie, Russell Downing

Stage 5, Russell Downing

Oslo GP, Edvald Boasson Hagen
Dutch Food Valley Classic, Edvald Boasson Hagen
Points classification Eneco Tour, Edvald Boasson Hagen

Stage 4, Edvald Boasson Hagen

United Kingdom National Time Trial, Bradley Wiggins
Points classification Tour of Britain, Greg Henderson

Stage 2, Greg Henderson

Stages 1, 4 & 9 Tour of Southland, Greg Henderson
Cronulla International Grand Prix Criterium, Chris Sutton

== 2011 – Sky Procycling ==
Sprint classification Bay Classic Series, Simon Gerrans
Stages 2 & 6 Tour Down Under, Ben Swift
Stage 3 Volta ao Algarve, Steve Cummings
Points classification Tour of Oman, Edvald Boasson Hagen
Kuurne–Brussels–Kuurne, Chris Sutton
Stage 2 Paris–Nice, Greg Henderson
Stage 5 Vuelta a Castilla y León, Ben Swift
Stage 5 Tour de Romandie, Ben Swift
Tour of California

Stage 2, Ben Swift
Stage 3, Greg Henderson

Overall Bayern Rundfahrt, Geraint Thomas

Sprints classification, Edvald Boasson Hagen
Teams classification (Note: The riders on the squad were Edvald Boasson Hagen, Christian Knees, Serge Pauwels, Michael Rogers, Chris Sutton, Geraint Thomas and Bradley Wiggins)
Stage 1, Edvald Boasson Hagen
Stage 4, Bradley Wiggins

Points classification Tour de Luxembourg, Davide Appollonio

Stage 3, Davide Appollonio

Smithfield Circuit, Alex Dowsett
Overall Critérium du Dauphiné, Bradley Wiggins
Stages 6 & 17 Tour de France, Edvald Boasson Hagen

Led Young rider classification on Stages 1–6, Geraint Thomas
Combativity award on Stage 9, Juan Antonio Flecha
Combativity award on Stage 12, Geraint Thomas

Stage 5 Tour of Austria, Ian Stannard
Porvoon ajot, Kjell Carlström
Norway National Time Trial, Edvald Boasson Hagen
United Kingdom National Road Race, Bradley Wiggins
United Kingdom National Time Trial, Alex Dowsett
Finland National Road Race, Kjell Carlström
Beaumont Trophy, Bradley Wiggins
Sandefjord Grand Prix, Edvald Boasson Hagen
East Yorkshire Classic Roadrace, Jeremy Hunt
Overall Danmark Rundt, Simon Gerrans

Teams classification (Note: The riders on the squad were Davide Appollonio, Kurt Asle Arvesen, Dario Cioni, Russell Downing, Alex Dowsett, Simon Gerrans, Jeremy Hunt and Chris Sutton)

Overall Eneco Tour, Edvald Boasson Hagen

Points classification, Edvald Boasson Hagen
Young rider classification, Edvald Boasson Hagen

Vattenfall Cyclassics, Edvald Boasson Hagen
Overall Vuelta a España, Chris Froome

Combination classification, Chris Froome
Stage 2, Chris Sutton
Stage 17, Chris Froome

Led General classification on Stage 10, Chris Froome
Led General classification on Stages 11–14, Bradley Wiggins
Led Points classification on Stage 2, Chris Sutton

Tour du Poitou-Charentes

Stage 1, Davide Appollonio
Stage 5, Alex Dowsett

Points classification Tour of Britain, Geraint Thomas
Teams classification (Note: The riders on the squad were Steven Cummings, Alex Dowsett, Mathew Hayman, Michael Rogers, Ben Swift and Geraint Thomas)
Rund um Sebnitz, Christian Knees

Stage 8a, Alex Dowsett

Teams classification Tour de Wallonie-Picarde (Note: The riders on the squad were Kjell Carlström, Russell Downing, Juan Antonio Flecha, Mathew Hayman, Greg Henderson, Michael Rogers, Ian Stannard and Chris Sutton)

Stage 2, Chris Sutton

Paris–Bourges, Mathew Hayman
Teams classification Tour of Beijing (Note: The riders on the squad were Davide Appollonio, Michael Barry, Dario Cioni, Steven Cummings, Alex Dowsett, Chris Froome, Jeremy Hunt and Christian Knees)
Overall Cronulla International Grand Prix, Chris Sutton

Stage 1, Chris Sutton

== 2012 – Sky Procycling ==
Sprints classification Tour Down Under, Edvald Boasson Hagen
Stages 3 & 5 Tour of Qatar, Mark Cavendish
Trofeo Deià, Lars Petter Nordhaug
Overall Volta ao Algarve, Richie Porte

Points classification, Edvald Boasson Hagen
Teams classification (Note: The riders on the squad were Edvald Boasson Hagen, Chris Froome, Thomas Löfkvist, Lars Petter Nordhaug, Richie Porte, Kanstantsin Sivtsov, Bradley Wiggins and Xabier Zandio)
Stage 2, Edvald Boasson Hagen
Stage 3, Richie Porte
Stage 5, Bradley Wiggins

Kuurne–Brussels–Kuurne, Mark Cavendish
Tirreno–Adriatico

Stage 2, Mark Cavendish
Stage 3, Edvald Boasson Hagen

Overall Paris–Nice, Bradley Wiggins

Points classification, Bradley Wiggins
Stage 8, Bradley Wiggins

Stage 4 Volta a Catalunya, Rigoberto Urán
Teams classification Critérium International (Note: The riders on the squad were Chris Froome, Thomas Löfkvist, Lars Petter Nordhaug, Salvatore Puccio, Michael Rogers and Luke Rowe)
World Track Championships (Scratch race), Ben Swift
World Track Championships (Team Pursuit), Geraint Thomas & Peter Kennaugh
Overall Tour de Romandie, Bradley Wiggins

Team classification (Note: The riders on the squad were Mark Cavendish, Chris Froome, Danny Pate, Richie Porte, Michael Rogers, Kanstantsin Sivtsov, Geraint Thomas and Bradley Wiggins)
Prologue, Geraint Thomas
Stages 1 & 5, Bradley Wiggins

Young rider classification Giro d'Italia, Rigoberto Urán

Azzurri d'Italia classification, Mark Cavendish
Combativity classification, Mark Cavendish
Stages 2, 5 & 13, Mark Cavendish

Overall Glava Tour of Norway, Edvald Boasson Hagen

Points classification, Edvald Boasson Hagen
Young rider classification, Edvald Boasson Hagen
Teams classification (Note: The riders on the squad were Davide Appollonio, Michael Barry, Edvald Boasson Hagen, Mathew Hayman, Lars Petter Nordhaug, Salvatore Puccio, Luke Rowe and Ben Swift)
Stage 4, Edvald Boasson Hagen

Overall Bayern Rundfahrt, Michael Rogers

Teams classification (Note: The riders on the squad were Christian Knees, Thomas Löfkvist, Danny Pate, Richie Porte, Michael Rogers, Kanstantsin Sivtsov and Xabier Zandio)
Stages 2 & 4, Michael Rogers

Overall Critérium du Dauphiné, Bradley Wiggins

Teams classification (Note: The riders on the squad were Edvald Boasson Hagen, Chris Froome, Christian Knees, Danny Pate, Richie Porte, Michael Rogers, Kanstantsin Sivtsov and Bradley Wiggins)
Stage 3, Edvald Boasson Hagen
Stage 4, Bradley Wiggins

London Nocturne, Ian Stannard
Overall Ster ZLM Toer, Mark Cavendish
Norway National Road Race, Edvald Boasson Hagen
United Kingdom National Road Race, Ian Stannard
United Kingdom National Time Trial, Alex Dowsett
Overall Tour de France, Bradley Wiggins

Stages 2, 18 & 20, Mark Cavendish
Stage 7, Chris Froome
Stages 9 & 19, Bradley Wiggins

Led Mountains classification on Stage 7, Chris Froome
Led Team classification on Prologue – Stage 7

Neuss Criterium, Christian Knees
Rhede Criterium, Christian Knees
Ninove Criterium, Mark Cavendish
Lacq Audejos Criterium, Mark Cavendish
Castillon-la-Bataille, Chris Froome
Profronde van Surhuisterveen, Mark Cavendish
Olympic Games Individual Time Trial Championship, Bradley Wiggins
Olympic Games Team pursuit Championship, Geraint Thomas & Peter Kennaugh
Points classification Tour de Pologne, Ben Swift

Teams classification (Note: The riders on the squad were Alex Dowsett, Juan Antonio Flecha, Mathew Hayman, Sergio Henao, Lars Petter Nordhaug, Ian Stannard, Ben Swift and Rigoberto Urán)
Stages 2 & 5, Ben Swift

Oslo GP, Mark Cavendish
Teams classification Danmark Rundt (Note: The riders on the squad were Mark Cavendish, Bernhard Eisel, Peter Kennaugh, Davide Martinelli, Lars Petter Nordhaug, Michael Rogers, Luke Rowe and Geraint Thomas)

Stage 3, Lars Petter Nordhaug

Combativity award on Stage 13 Vuelta a España, Juan Antonio Flecha
GP Ouest-France, Edvald Boasson Hagen
Stage 1 Tour of Britain, Luke Rowe
Stages 3, 4 & 8 Tour of Britain, Mark Cavendish
Wetteren-Wetteren Criterium, Bradley Wiggins
Grand Prix Cycliste de Montréal, Lars Petter Nordhaug
Giro del Piemonte, Rigoberto Urán
Points classification Tour of Beijing, Edvald Boasson Hagen
Team classification UCI World Tour

== 2013 – Sky Procycling ==
Sprints classification Tour Down Under, Geraint Thomas

Stage 2, Geraint Thomas
Combativity award Stage 6, Geraint Thomas

Overall Tour of Oman, Chris Froome

Points classification, Chris Froome
Stage 5, Chris Froome

Stage 3 Volta ao Algarve, Sergio Henao
Overall Paris–Nice, Richie Porte

Stages 5 & 7, Richie Porte

Stage 4 Tirreno–Adriatico, Chris Froome
Overall Critérium International, Chris Froome

Points classification, Richie Porte
Stage 2 (ITT), Richie Porte
Stage 3, Chris Froome

Points classification Tour of the Basque Country, Sergio Henao

Stage 3, Sergio Henao
Stage 5, Richie Porte

Stage 1b (TTT) Giro del Trentino (Note: The riders on the squad were Dario Cataldo, Joe Dombrowski, Peter Kennaugh, Christian Knees, Danny Pate, Kanstantsin Sivtsov, Bradley Wiggins and Xabier Zandio)
Stage 2 Giro del Trentino, Kanstantsin Sivtsov
Overall Tour de Romandie, Chris Froome

Team classification (Note: The riders on the squad were Josh Edmondson, Chris Froome, Peter Kennaugh, Vasil Kiryienka, David López, Richie Porte, Gabriel Rasch and Chris Sutton)
Prologue, Chris Froome

Trofeo Fast Team Giro d'Italia

Stage 2 (TTT) (Note: The riders on the squad were Dario Cataldo, Rigoberto Urán, Sergio Henao, Christian Knees, Danny Pate, Kanstantsin Sivtsov, Bradley Wiggins, Salvatore Puccio and Xabier Zandio)
Stage 10, Rigoberto Urán

Led General classification on Stage 2, Salvatore Puccio
Led Young rider classification on Stage 2, Salvatore Puccio

Lincoln GP, Peter Kennaugh
Overall Tour of Norway, Edvald Boasson Hagen

Points classification, Edvald Boasson Hagen
Stage 4, Edvald Boasson Hagen

Overall Critérium du Dauphiné, Chris Froome

Team classification (Note: The riders on the squad were Edvald Boasson Hagen, Chris Froome, Peter Kennaugh, Vasil Kiryienka, David López, Richie Porte, Ian Stannard and Geraint Thomas)
Stage 3, Edvald Boasson Hagen
Stage 5, Chris Froome

Norway National Time Trial, Edvald Boasson Hagen
Belarus National Time Trial, Kanstantsin Sivtsov
Overall Tour de France, Chris Froome

Stages 8, 15 & 17 (ITT), Chris Froome

Led Mountains classification, on Stage 8 & 15–19 Chris Froome

Aalst Criterium, Chris Froome
Profronde van Stiphout, Chris Froome
Sint-Niklaas Criterium, Chris Froome
Lacq Audejos Criterium, Richie Porte
Marcolès Criterium, Richie Porte
Stage 7 (ITT) Tour de Pologne, Bradley Wiggins
Etten-Leur Criterium, Chris Froome
Stage 6 Eneco Tour, David López
Stage 18 Vuelta a España, Vasil Kiryienka
Combativity award Stage 19 Vuelta a España, Edvald Boasson Hagen
Overall Tour of Britain, Bradley Wiggins

Teams classification
Stage 3 (ITT) Tour of Britain, Bradley Wiggins

Saitama Criterium, Chris Froome
Elimination Race Revolution (Round 1), Luke Rowe

== 2014 – Team Sky ==
Points Race Revolution (Round 3), Peter Kennaugh
Stage 5 Tour Down Under, Richie Porte
Points Race Revolution (Round 4), Peter Kennaugh
Scratch Race Revolution (Round 4), Ben Swift
Overall Tour of Oman, Chris Froome

Team classification (Note: The riders on the squad were Dario Cataldo, Chris Froome, Sergio Henao, David López, Mikel Nieve, Danny Pate, Kanstantsin Sivtsov, Ben Swift)
Stage 5, Chris Froome

Omloop Het Nieuwsblad, Ian Stannard
Overall Settimana Internazionale di Coppi e Bartali, Peter Kennaugh

Points classification, Ben Swift

Team classification

Stage 1a, Ben Swift
Stage 1b (TTT)
Stage 2, Peter Kennaugh
Stage 4 (ITT), Dario Cataldo

Stage 5 Tour of the Basque Country, Ben Swift
Overall Tour de Romandie, Chris Froome

Stage 5 (ITT), Chris Froome

Giro d'Italia

Cima Coppi, Dario Cataldo

Led Trofeo Super Team on Stage 3

Overall Tour of California, Bradley Wiggins

Stage 2 (ITT), Bradley Wiggins

Overall Bayern Rundfahrt, Geraint Thomas

Stage 4 (ITT), Geraint Thomas

Points classification Critérium du Dauphiné, Chris Froome

Stages 1 (ITT) & 2, Chris Froome
Stage 8, Mikel Nieve

Belarus National Time Trial, Kanstantsin Sivtsov
United Kingdom National Road Race, Peter Kennaugh
United Kingdom National Time Trial, Bradley Wiggins
Tour de France

Combativity award Stage 18, Mikel Nieve

Led Teams classification on Stages 1– 4

Overall Tour of Austria, Peter Kennaugh

Points classification, Peter Kennaugh
Stage 1, Peter Kennaugh

Bischofhofen Criterium, Bernhard Eisel
Commonwealth Games Road Race, Geraint Thomas
Stage 8a (ITT) Tour of Britain, Bradley Wiggins
Overall Combativity award Vuelta a España, Chris Froome
World Time Trial Championships, Bradley Wiggins
Japan Cup Criterium, Christopher Sutton

== 2015 – Team Sky ==
Australia National Time Trial, Richie Porte
Stage 5 Tour Down Under, Richie Porte
Stage 2 Dubai Tour, Elia Viviani
Overall Vuelta a Andalucía, Chris Froome

Stage 4, Chris Froome
Points classification, Chris Froome
Team classification (Note: The riders on the squad were Chris Froome, Peter Kennaugh, Vasil Kiryienka, Mikel Nieve, Nicolas Roche, Kanstantsin Sivtsov and Xabier Zandio)

Overall Volta ao Algarve, Geraint Thomas

Mountains classification, Richie Porte
Points classification, Geraint Thomas
Stage 2, Geraint Thomas
Stage 4, Richie Porte

Omloop Het Nieuwsblad, Ian Stannard
Overall Paris–Nice, Richie Porte

Teams classification (Note: The riders on the squad were Christian Knees, Lars Petter Nordhaug, Richie Porte, Nicolas Roche, Luke Rowe, Ben Swift, Geraint Thomas and Bradley Wiggins)
Stages 4 & 7 (ITT), Richie Porte

Stage 4 Tirreno–Adriatico, Wout Poels
E3 Harelbeke, Geraint Thomas
Points classification Settimana Internazionale di Coppi e Bartali, Ben Swift

Teams classification (Note: The riders on the squad were Ian Boswell, Philip Deignan, Nathan Earle, Sergio Henao, Kanstantsin Sivtsov, Ben Swift and Christopher Sutton)
Stage 2, Ben Swift

Overall Volta a Catalunya, Richie Porte
Stage 3b (ITT) Three Days of De Panne, Bradley Wiggins
Overall Giro del Trentino, Richie Porte

Stage 2, Richie Porte

Stage 1 Tour de Romandie, Team time trial (Note: The riders on the squad were Geraint Thomas, Chris Froome, Danny Pate, Luke Rowe, Elia Viviani, Peter Kennaugh, Nicolas Roche and Ian Stannard)
Overall Tour de Yorkshire, Lars Petter Nordhaug

Points classification, Lars Petter Nordhaug
Teams classification
Stage 1, Lars Petter Nordhaug

Giro d'Italia

Stage 2, Elia Viviani
Stage 14 (ITT), Vasil Kiryienka
Led Points classification on Stages 2–5, 7–9, 13, Elia Viviani

Overall Critérium du Dauphiné, Chris Froome

Stage 1, Peter Kennaugh
Stages 7 & 8, Chris Froome

Team classification Tour de Suisse
Belarus National Time Trial, Vasil Kiryienka
United Kingdom National Road Race, Peter Kennaugh
European Games Individual Time Trial, Vasil Kiryienka
Overall Tour de France, Chris Froome

Mountains classification, Chris Froome
Stage 10, Chris Froome

Led Teams classification on Stages 10–11

Stage 6 Tour de Pologne, Sergio Henao
Stage 1 Eneco Tour, Elia Viviani
Stage 18 Vuelta a España, Nicolas Roche

Led Team classification on Stages 2–17

Stages 1 & 3 Tour of Britain, Elia Viviani
Stage 5 Tour of Britain, Wout Poels
World Time Trial Championships, Vasil Kiryienka
Points classification Abu Dhabi Tour, Elia Viviani

Stages 2 & 4, Elia Viviani

Chrono des Nations, Vasil Kiryienka
European Omnium, Elia Viviani

== 2016 – Team Sky ==
Mountains classification Tour Down Under, Sergio Henao
Cadel Evans Great Ocean Road Race, Peter Kennaugh
Overall Volta a la Comunitat Valenciana, Wout Poels

Points classification, Wout Poels
Mountains classification, Wout Poels
Teams classification
Stages 1 & 4, Wout Poels

Overall Herald Sun Tour, Chris Froome

Mountains classification, Chris Froome
Team classification
Stage 1, Peter Kennaugh
Stage 4, Chris Froome

Stage 2 Dubai Tour, Elia Viviani
Points classification Vuelta a Andalucía, Ben Swift
Overall Volta ao Algarve, Geraint Thomas
Overall Paris–Nice, Geraint Thomas
Stage 5 Volta a Catalunya, Wout Poels
E3 Harelbeke, Michał Kwiatkowski
Sprints classification Three Days of De Panne, Danny van Poppel

Stage 2, Elia Viviani

Points classification Tour of the Basque Country, Sergio Henao

Teams classification (Note: The riders on the squad were Mikel Landa, Sergio Henao, Philip Deignan, Sebastián Henao, Vasil Kiryienka, David Lopez, Lars Petter Nordhaug and Xabier Zandio)
Stage 2, Mikel Landa

Overall Giro del Trentino, Mikel Landa

Mountains classification, Mikel Landa
Stage 2, Mikel Landa

Liège–Bastogne–Liège, Wout Poels
Stage 4 Tour de Romandie, Chris Froome

Combativity award Stage 5

Stage 2 Tour de Yorkshire, Danny van Poppel
Mountains classification Giro d'Italia, Mikel Nieve

Stage 13, Mikel Nieve

Overall Critérium du Dauphiné, Chris Froome

Team classification
Stage 5, Chris Froome

Czech Republic National Time Trial, Leopold König
Ireland National Time Trial, Nicolas Roche
Ireland National Road Race, Nicolas Roche
Overall Tour de France, Chris Froome

Stages 8 & 18 (ITT), Chris Froome

Aalst Criterium, Chris Froome
Points classification Vuelta a Burgos, Danny van Poppel

Stages 1 & 3, Danny van Poppel

Overall Arctic Race of Norway, Gianni Moscon

Youth classification, Gianni Moscon
Teams classification
Stage 2, Danny van Poppel
Stage 3, Gianni Moscon

Olympic Games Track Championships (Omnium), Elia Viviani
Vuelta a España

Stage 1 (TTT)
Stages 11 & 19 (ITT), Chris Froome
Stage 12 Combativity award, David López
Stage 19 Combativity award, Chris Froome

Led General classification on Stage 1, Peter Kennaugh
Led General classification on Stage 2, Michał Kwiatkowski

Tour of Britain

Stage 3, Ian Stannard
Stage 6, Wout Poels
Teams classification
Stage 2 Combativity award, Nicolas Roche
Stage 3 Combativity award, Ian Stannard

Chrono des Nations, Vasil Kiryienka

== 2017 – Team Sky ==
Team classification Herald Sun Tour

Most aggressive rider Stage 2, Luke Rowe
Prologue, Danny van Poppel
Stage 1, Luke Rowe
Stage 4, Ian Stannard

Colombia National Road Race, Sergio Henao
Strade Bianche, Michał Kwiatkowski
Stage 2 Tirreno–Adriatico, Geraint Thomas
Overall Paris–Nice, Sergio Henao
Milan–San Remo, Michał Kwiatkowski
Overall Tour of the Alps, Geraint Thomas

Stage 3, Geraint Thomas

Stage 3 Tour de Romandie, Elia Viviani
Teams classification Tour of California

Stage 6 (ITT), Jonathan Dibben

Mountains classification Giro d'Italia, Mikel Landa

Stage 19, Mikel Landa
Cima Coppi, Mikel Landa
Premio Combattività, Mikel Landa

Overall, Hammer Series
Stage 7 Critérium du Dauphiné, Peter Kennaugh
Stage 2 Route du Sud, Elia Viviani
Poland National Time Trial, Michał Kwiatkowski
Italy National Time Trial, Gianni Moscon
Overall Tour de France, Chris Froome

Team classification
Stage 1 (ITT), Geraint Thomas

Led General classification Stages 1-4, Geraint Thomas
Led Points classification Stage 2, Geraint Thomas

Clásica de San Sebastián, Michał Kwiatkowski
Mountains classification Tour de Pologne, Diego Rosa

Stage 5, Danny van Poppel
Stage 7, Wout Poels

Overall Vuelta a Burgos, Mikel Landa

Points classification, Mikel Landa
Mountains classification, Mikel Landa
Spanish rider classification, Mikel Landa
Stages 1 & 3, Mikel Landa

EuroEyes Cyclassics, Elia Viviani
Overall Vuelta a España, Chris Froome

Points classification, Chris Froome
Combination classification, Chris Froome
Stages 9 & 16 (ITT), Chris Froome
Stage 16 Combativity award, Chris Froome

Points classification Tour du Poitou-Charentes, Elia Viviani

Stages 1 & 3, Elia Viviani

GP Ouest-France, Elia Viviani
Stage 2 Tour of Britain, Elia Viviani
Team classification, UCI World Tour

== 2018 – Team Sky ==
Youth classification, Tour Down Under, Egan Bernal
Colombia National Time Trial, Egan Bernal
Colombia National Road Race, Sergio Henao
Overall Colombia Oro y Paz, Egan Bernal

Mountains classification, Egan Bernal
Youth classification, Egan Bernal
Team classification

Points classification Vuelta a Andalucía, Wout Poels

Stage 2 Vuelta a Andalucía, Wout Poels
Stage 5 (ITT), David de la Cruz

Overall, Volta ao Algarve, Michał Kwiatkowski

Points classification, Michał Kwiatkowski
Teams classification
Stages 2 & 5, Michał Kwiatkowski
Stage 3 (ITT), Geraint Thomas

Paris–Nice

Stage 4 (ITT), Wout Poels
Stage 8, David de la Cruz

Overall Tirreno–Adriatico, Michał Kwiatkowski
Overall Settimana Internazionale di Coppi e Bartali, Diego Rosa

Points classification, Chris Lawless
Young rider classification, Pavel Sivakov
Stage 1b (TTT)
Stage 3, Chris Lawless

Youth classification Tour de Romandie, Egan Bernal

Stage 3 (ITT), Egan Bernal

Overall Tour of California, Egan Bernal

Youth classification, Egan Bernal
Team classification
Stages 2 & 5, Egan Bernal

Overall Giro d'Italia, Chris Froome

Mountains classification, Chris Froome
Stages 14 & 19, Chris Froome
Cima Coppi, Chris Froome
Team classification

Overall Critérium du Dauphiné, Geraint Thomas

Team classification
Prologue, Michał Kwiatkowski
Stage 3 (TTT)

Spain National Time Trial, Jonathan Castroviejo
Poland National Road Race, Michał Kwiatkowski
Netherlands National Time Trial, Dylan van Baarle
United Kingdom National Time Trial, Geraint Thomas
Belarus National Time Trial, Vasil Kiryienka
Overall Tour de France, Geraint Thomas

Stages 11 & 12, Geraint Thomas

Overall Tour de Pologne, Michał Kwiatkowski

Stages 4 & 5, Michał Kwiatkowski

Vuelta a España

Lead General classification on Stages 3–5, Michał Kwiatkowski
Lead Points classification on Stages 3–7, Michał Kwiatkowski
Lead ] Combined classification on Stages 3–5 & 7, Michał Kwiatkowski
Lead Teams classification on Stages 3–4

Stage 14 Combativity award, Michał Kwiatkowski
Stage 19 Combativity award, Jonathan Castroviejo

Tour of Britain

Stage 6, Wout Poels
Stage 7, Ian Stannard
Stage 7 Combativity award, Ian Stannard
Stage 8 Combativity award, Vasil Kiryienka

Coppa Ugo Agostoni, Gianni Moscon
Giro della Toscana, Gianni Moscon
Italy National Time Trial, Gianni Moscon
Overall Tour of Guangxi, Gianni Moscon

Stage 4, Gianni Moscon
Young rider classification Gianni Moscon

Stage 3 Combativity award, Owain Doull

== 2019 – Team Sky / Team Ineos ==
Overall Herald Sun Tour, Dylan van Baarle

Mountains classification, Christian Knees
Youth classification, Pavel Sivakov
Team classification
Stage 3, Owain Doull
Stage 5, Kristoffer Halvorsen
Stage 4 combativity award, Dylan van Baarle

Stage 1, Tour La Provence, Filippo Ganna
Mountains classification, Tour Colombia, Iván Sosa
World Track Championships (Individual Pursuit), Filippo Ganna
Overall Paris–Nice, Egan Bernal

Points classification, Michał Kwiatkowski
Youth classification, Egan Bernal
Team classification

Overall Tour of the Alps, Pavel Sivakov

Youth classification, Pavel Sivakov
Team classification
Stages 1 & 4, Tao Geoghegan Hart
Stage 2, Pavel Sivakov

Overall Tour de Yorkshire, Chris Lawless

Points classification, Chris Lawless
Team classification

Giro d'Italia

Led Youth classification on Stages 14-16, Pavel Sivakov

Stage 6 Tour of Norway, Kristoffer Halvorsen

Youth classification, Kristoffer Halvorsen

Critérium du Dauphiné

Stage 7, Wout Poels
Stage 8, Dylan van Baarle

Overall Tour de Suisse, Egan Bernal

Stage 7, Egan Bernal
Youth classification, Egan Bernal

Youth classification Route d'Occitanie, Iván Sosa

Stage 3, Iván Sosa

European Games, Time trial, Vasil Kiryienka
Italy National Time Trial, Filippo Ganna
Spain National Time Trial, Jonathan Castroviejo
United Kingdom National Road Race, Ben Swift
Overall Tour de France, Egan Bernal

Young rider classification, Egan Bernal

Young rider classification Tour de Wallonie, Chris Lawless

Team classification

Overall Tour de Pologne, Pavel Sivakov

Team classification

Vuelta a Burgos, Iván Sosa

Mountains classification, Iván Sosa
Youth classification, Iván Sosa
Team classification
Stages 3 & 5, Iván Sosa

Stage 6 (ITT), BinckBank Tour, Filippo Ganna
Vuelta a España

Stage 8 combativity award, David de la Cruz
Stage 20 combativity award, Tao Geoghegan Hart

Overall combativity award Tour of Britain, Dylan van Baarle

Stage 4 combativity award, Dylan van Baarle
Stage 8 combativity award, Pavel Sivakov
Team classification

Gran Piemonte, Egan Bernal

== 2020 – Team Ineos / Ineos Grenadiers ==
Young Rider classification, Tour Down Under, Pavel Sivakov

Team classification

Stage 3 Combativity award, Tour Colombia, Sebastián Henao
Stage 4 Tour de la Provence, Owain Doull
Team classification, Volta ao Algarve
World Track Championships (Individual Pursuit), Filippo Ganna
Stage 5 Vuelta a Burgos, Iván Sosa
Overall Route d'Occitanie, Egan Bernal

Points classification, Egan Bernal
Young rider classification, Egan Bernal
Stage 3, Egan Bernal

Stage 3 Tour de Pologne, Richard Carapaz
Italy National Time Trial, Filippo Ganna
Overall Settimana Internazionale di Coppi e Bartali, Jhonatan Narváez

Points classification, Jhonatan Narváez
Young rider classification, Jhonatan Narváez
Stage 3, Jhonatan Narváez

Stage 8, Tirreno–Adriatico, Filippo Ganna
Tour de France

Stage 18, Michał Kwiatkowski
Stage 16 combativity award, Richard Carapaz

Giro dell'Appennino, Ethan Hayter
World Championships – Time Trial, Filippo Ganna
Overall Giro d'Italia, Tao Geoghegan Hart

Young rider classification, Tao Geoghegan Hart
Stages 1 (ITT), 5, 14 (ITT) & 21 (ITT), Filippo Ganna
Stage 12, Jhonatan Narváez
Stages 15 & 20, Tao Geoghegan Hart
Team classification
Cima Coppi, Rohan Dennis

== 2021 – Ineos Grenadiers ==
Stages 4 & 5 (ITT) Étoile de Bessèges, Filippo Ganna
Overall Tour de la Provence, Iván Sosa

Stage 3, Iván Sosa

Stage 2 (ITT) UAE Tour, Filippo Ganna
Overall Volta a Catalunya, Adam Yates

Teams classification
Stage 2 (ITT), Rohan Dennis
Stage 3, Adam Yates

Stage 3 Settimana Internazionale di Coppi e Bartali, Ethan Hayter
Dwars door Vlaanderen, Dylan van Baarle
Brabantse Pijl, Tom Pidcock
Stages 1 & 3 Tour of the Alps, Gianni Moscon
Overall Tour de Romandie, Geraint Thomas

Teams classification
Prologue, Rohan Dennis

Stage 2 Volta ao Algarve, Ethan Hayter
Swiss Bike XCO Cup Leukerbad, Tom Pidcock
UCI XCO World Cup Nové Město, Tom Pidcock
Overall Giro d'Italia, Egan Bernal

Young rider classification, Egan Bernal
Stages 1 (ITT) & 21 (ITT), Filippo Ganna
Stages 9 & 16, Egan Bernal
Cima Coppi, Egan Bernal

Stages 2 & 5 Vuelta a Andalucía, Ethan Hayter
Overall Critérium du Dauphiné, Richie Porte

Teams classification
Stage 5, Geraint Thomas

Overall Tour de Suisse, Richard Carapaz

Stage 5, Richard Carapaz
Young rider classification, Eddie Dunbar

Gran Premio di Lugano, Gianni Moscon
Olympic Road Race, Richard Carapaz
Olympic Team pursuit, Filippo Ganna
Olympic Cross-country, Tom Pidcock
Overall Tour of Norway, Ethan Hayter

Stages 1 & 2, Ethan Hayter

Stage 3 (TTT) Tour of Britain
Stage 5 Tour of Britain, Ethan Hayter
Team relay, European Road Championships, Filippo Ganna
Time Trial, UCI Road World Championships, Filippo Ganna
United Kingdom National Time Trial, Ethan Hayter
United Kingdom National Criterium Championships, Ethan Hayter
United Kingdom National Road Race, Ben Swift
Team pursuit, UCI Track Cycling World Championships, Filippo Ganna
Omnium, UCI Track Cycling World Championships, Ethan Hayter
UCI CX World Cup Rucphen, Tom Pidcock

== 2022 – Ineos Grenadiers ==
UCI CX World Cup Hulst, Tom Pidcock
Hexia Cyclocross Gullegem, Tom Pidcock
Australia National Road Race, Luke Plapp
UCI World CX Championships, Tom Pidcock
Stage 5 (ITT) Étoile de Bessèges, Filippo Ganna
Colombia National Time Trial, Daniel Martínez
Prologue Tour de la Provence, Filippo Ganna
Stage 1 Tour de la Provence, Elia Viviani
Ecuador National Time Trial, Richard Carapaz
Stage 3 Vuelta a Andalucía, Magnus Sheffield
Stage 1 (ITT) Tirreno–Adriatico, Filippo Ganna
Overall Settimana Internazionale di Coppi e Bartali, Eddie Dunbar

Points classification, Ethan Hayter
Youth classification, Ben Tulett
Team classification
Stage 2, Ethan Hayter
Stage 3, Ben Tulett

Stage 6 Volta a Catalunya, Richard Carapaz
Overall Tour of the Basque Country, Daniel Martínez

Points classification, Daniel Martínez
Team classification
Stage 4, Daniel Martínez
Stage 5, Carlos Rodríguez

Amstel Gold Race, Michał Kwiatkowski
Brabantse Pijl, Magnus Sheffield
Paris–Roubaix, Dylan van Baarle
Prologue & Stage 2 Tour de Romandie, Ethan Hayter
Overall Tour de Hongrie, Eddie Dunbar
UCI XCO World Cup Albstadt, Tom Pidcock
UCI XCO World Cup Nové Město, Tom Pidcock
Stage 4 (ITT) Critérium du Dauphiné, Filippo Ganna
Overall Tour de Suisse, Geraint Thomas
Italy National Time Trial, Filippo Ganna
United Kingdom National Time Trial, Ethan Hayter
Spain National Road Race, Carlos Rodríguez
Stage 12 Tour de France, Tom Pidcock
Overall Tour de Pologne, Ethan Hayter
Overall Vuelta a Burgos, Pavel Sivakov
Stage 2 (ITT) Danmark Rundt, Magnus Sheffield
UEC European XCO Championships, Tom Pidcock
Overall Deutschland Tour, Adam Yates

Prologue, Filippo Ganna
Stage 3, Adam Yates

Mountains classification Vuelta a España, Richard Carapaz

Stages 12, 14 & 20, Richard Carapaz

Coppa Sabatini, Daniel Martínez
Stage 6 CRO Race, Elia Viviani
CX Superprestige Boom, Tom Pidcock
CX X²O Badkamers Trophy Kortrijk, Tom Pidcock

== 2023 – Ineos Grenadiers ==
Australia National Road Race Championships, Luke Plapp
Stage 4 Volta a la Comunitat Valenciana, Tao Geoghegan Hart
Vuelta a Murcia, Ben Turner
Overall Volta ao Algarve, Daniel Martínez

Stage 4, Tom Pidcock

Stage 5 Vuelta a Andalucía, Omar Fraile
Strade Bianche, Tom Pidcock
Stage 1 (ITT) Tirreno–Adriatico, Filippo Ganna
Stage 1 Tour of the Basque Country, Ethan Hayter
Overall Tour of the Alps, Tao Geoghegan Hart

Stages 1 & 2, Tao Geoghegan Hart

Stage 2 Tour de Romandie, Ethan Hayter
XCO Ökk Bike Revolution Chur, Tom Pidcock
UCI XCC World Cup Nové Město, Tom Pidcock
UCI XCO World Cup Nové Město, Tom Pidcock
Overall Tour of Norway, Ben Tulett

Prologue, Ben Tulett

United Kingdom National Time Trial Championships, Joshua Tarling
Italy National Time Trial Championships, Filippo Ganna
Poland National Time Trial Championships, Michał Kwiatkowski
Spain National Time Trial Championships, Jonathan Castroviejo
Canada National U23 Time Trial Championships, Michael Leonard
Overall Tour of Austria, Jhonatan Narváez

Stages 2, 3 & 5, Jhonatan Narváez

Stage 13 Tour de France, Michał Kwiatkowski
Stage 14 Tour de France, Carlos Rodríguez
UCI World XCO Championships, Tom Pidcock
Overall Tour de Wallonie, Filippo Ganna

Stages 1 & 4 (ITT), Filippo Ganna

Stage 2 (ITT) Renewi Tour, Joshua Tarling
Stage 10 (ITT) Vuelta a España, Filippo Ganna
UCI XCO World Cup Mont-Sainte-Anne, Tom Pidcock
Stage 8 Tour of Britain, Carlos Rodríguez
Giro della Toscana, Pavel Sivakov
Stage 1 CRO Race, Elia Viviani
Stage 1 Tour of Guangxi, Elia Viviani
Chrono des Nations, Joshua Tarling
UCI CX World Cup Namur, Tom Pidcock

== 2024 – Ineos Grenadiers ==
Ecuador National Road Race Championships, Jhonatan Narváez
Stage 1 (ITT) O Gran Camiño, Josh Tarling
Shimano XCO Super Cup La Nucia, Tom Pidcock
Stage 6 Tour of the Basque Country, Carlos Rodríguez
Amstel Gold Race, Tom Pidcock
Stage 1 Tour of the Alps, Tobias Foss
Overall Tour de Romandie, Carlos Rodríguez
Stage 1 Giro d'Italia, Jhonatan Narváez
Stage 14 (ITT) Giro d'Italia, Filippo Ganna
UCI XCO World Cup Nové Město, Tom Pidcock
Stage 8 Critérium du Dauphiné, Carlos Rodríguez
United Kingdom National Time Trial Championships, Joshua Tarling
Italy National Time Trial Championships, Filippo Ganna
United Kingdom National Road Race Championships, Ethan Hayter
Stage 2 Tour of Austria, Brandon Rivera
Stage 4 Tour of Austria, Filippo Ganna
Olympic Cross-country, Tom Pidcock

== 2025 – Ineos Grenadiers ==
Colombia National Time Trial, Egan Bernal
Colombia National Road Race, Egan Bernal
Clásica Jaén Paraíso Interior, Michał Kwiatkowski
Stage 2 (ITT) UAE Tour, Josh Tarling

== Supplementary statistics ==
World Team Time Trial performance
World TTT Championships	2010	2011	2012	2013	2014	2015	2016	2017	2018	2019	2020	2021	2022	2023	2024
Position	–	–	9	3	4	9	4	3	4	Does not Exist					
Margin	–	–	+ 1' 32"	+ 22"	+ 38"	+ 1' 42"	+ 54"	+ 22"	+ 45"	Does not Exist					
Grand Tours by highest finishing position
Race	2010	2011	2012	2013	2014	2015	2016	2017	2018	2019	2020	2021	2022	2023	2024
Giro d'Italia	17	20	7	2	22	6	17	17	1	9	1	1	2	2	3
Tour de France	16	24	1	1	18	1	1	1	1	1	13	3	3	5	7
Vuelta a España	DNF (Note: The team pulled out ahead of stage 8 after the death of team soigneur Txema Gonzalez)	1	4	27	2	8	2	1	15	20	2	4	7	31	
Major week-long stage races by highest finishing position
Race	2010	2011	2012	2013	2014	2015	2016	2017	2018	2019	2020	2021	2022	2023	2024
Tour Down Under	3	3	4	3	4	2	3	12	6	3	4	NH		4	2
Paris–Nice	14	3	1	1	47	1	1	1	9	1	—	13	3	9	7
Tirreno–Adriatico	35	10	46	2	10	7	8	5	1	7	2	4	4	3	6
Volta a Catalunya	53	4	5	5	6	1	8	30	78	3	NH	1	2	16	3
Tour of the Basque Country	29	27	6	2	24	2	2	8	9	34	NH	4	1	34	2
Giro del Trentino	–	–	–	5	16	1	1	1	4	1	NH	6	7	1	13
Tour de Romandie	22	15	1	1	1	3	38	18	2	3	NH	1	9	8	1
Critérium du Dauphiné	21	1	1	1	8	1	1	4	1	4	11	1	8	9	4
Tour de Suisse	12	47	17	35	38	2	17	9	14	1	NH	1	1	22	
Tour de Pologne	23	5	3	5	7	8	26	3	1	1	26	3	1	3	
Benelux Tour	3	1	15	18	6	50	26	59	5	18	14	17	NH (Note: The Organisers cancelled the 2022 edition due to an "overcrowded" calendar.)	11	
Monument races by highest finishing position
Monument	2010	2011	2012	2013	2014	2015	2016	2017	2018	2019	2020	2021	2022	2023	2024
Milan–San Remo	18	30	25	6	3	13	2	1	11	3	15	15	16	2	11
Tour of Flanders	13	10	19	17	8	14	5	15	12	18	8	10	2	25	6
Paris–Roubaix	3	9	4	12	7	8	3	5	19	21	NH	4	1	6	17
Liège–Bastogne–Liège	11	5	20	16	70	7	1	3	9	10	10	11	4	2	10
Giro di Lombardia	23	19	3	22	47	6	26	3	12	3	13	3	5	7	
Classics by highest finishing position
Classic	2010	2011	2012	2013	2014	2015	2016	2017	2018	2019	2020	2021	2022	2023	2024
Omloop Het Nieuwsblad	1	2	3	4	1	1	4	6	2	14	38	22	18	5	8
Kuurne–Brussels–Kuurne	3	1	1	NH	38	3	23	3	8	2	8	3	29	24	19
Strade Bianche	2	—	—	—	11	13	9	1	14	12	12	3	6	1	4
E3 Harelbeke	3	—	3	4	3	1	1	15	8	54	NH	7	6	10	6
Gent–Wevelgem	17	33	5	7	23	3	22	21	45	18	12	8	28	13	25
Amstel Gold Race	44	3	21	6	39	16	28	2	18	11	NH	2	1	3	1
La Flèche Wallonne	22	18	14	2	126	7	4	4	11	16	6	6	5	18	DNF
Clásica de San Sebastián	25	8	20	40	4	16	9	1	26	15	NH	9	2	15	
Paris–Tours	50	4	66	—	—	—	23	—	—	—	—	—	34	—	

Legend
—	Did not compete
DNF	Did not finish
DNS	Did not start
NH	Not held

=== Season stats ===
Wins per season
Race	2010	2011	2012	2013	2014	2015	2016	2017	2018	2019	2020	2021	2022
World Tour rank	15	2	1	2	9	3	3	1	2	5	4	2	4
One-day races	5	8	14	8	4	4	5	5	2	1	1	3	4
Stage races	3	6	8	8	6	8	8	5	8	8	3	7	7
Stage race stages	19	21	32	24	15	27	24	20	22	14	14	23	22
Grand Tours	0	1	1	1	0	1	1	2	2	1	1	1	0
World champions	0	0	0	0	1	1	0	0	0	0	1	1	0
National champions	3	4	3	2	3	3	3	3	8	3	1	3	6

== Gallery ==
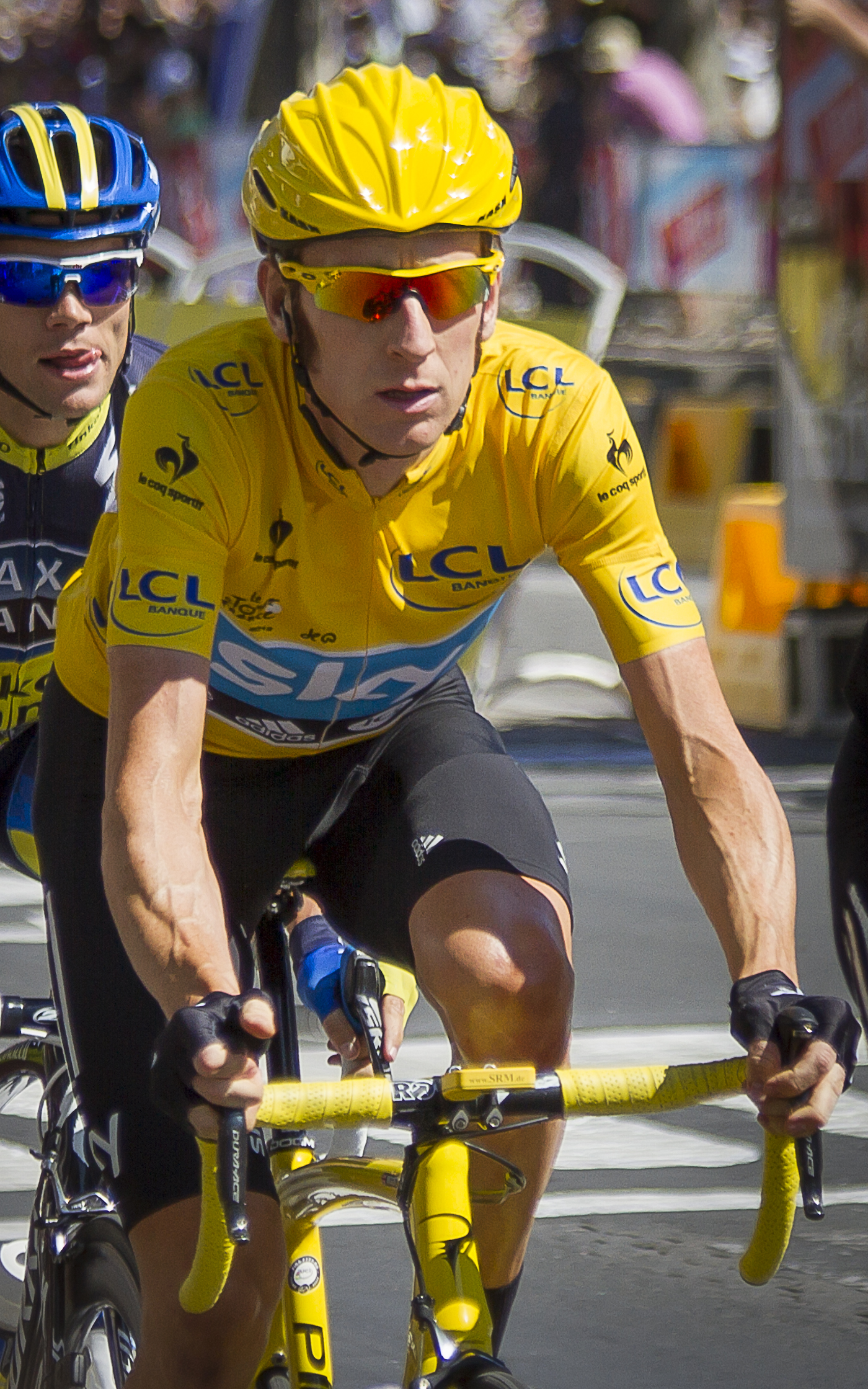
Bradley Wiggins en route to the team's first victory in the 2012 Tour de France.

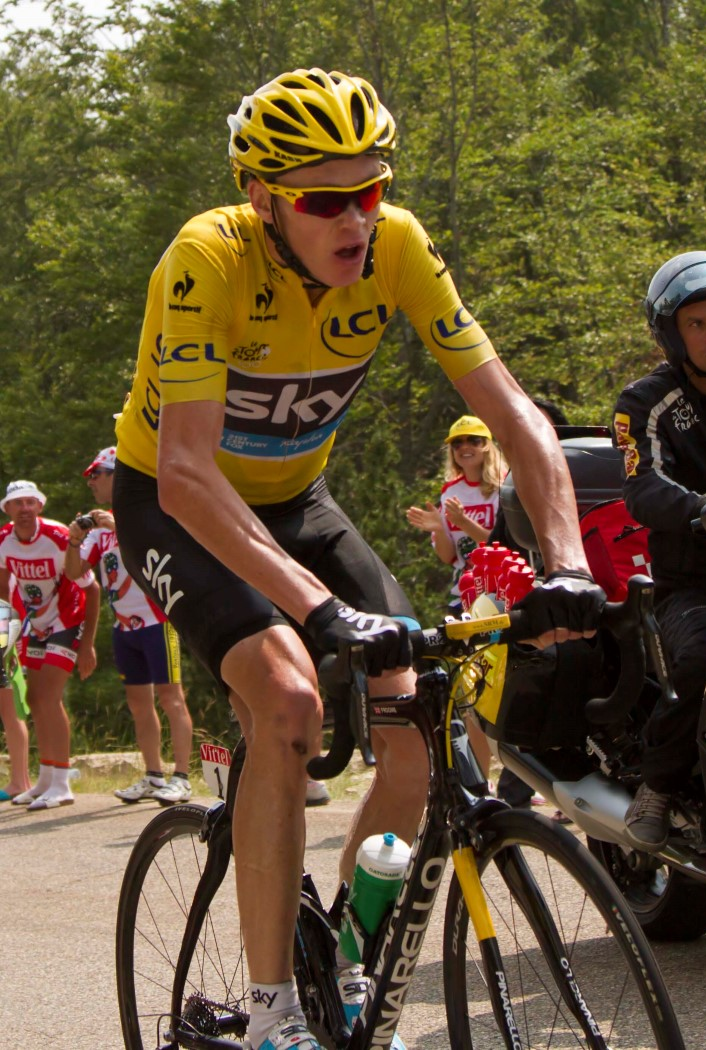
Chris Froome at the 2013 Tour de France, his first overall victory.

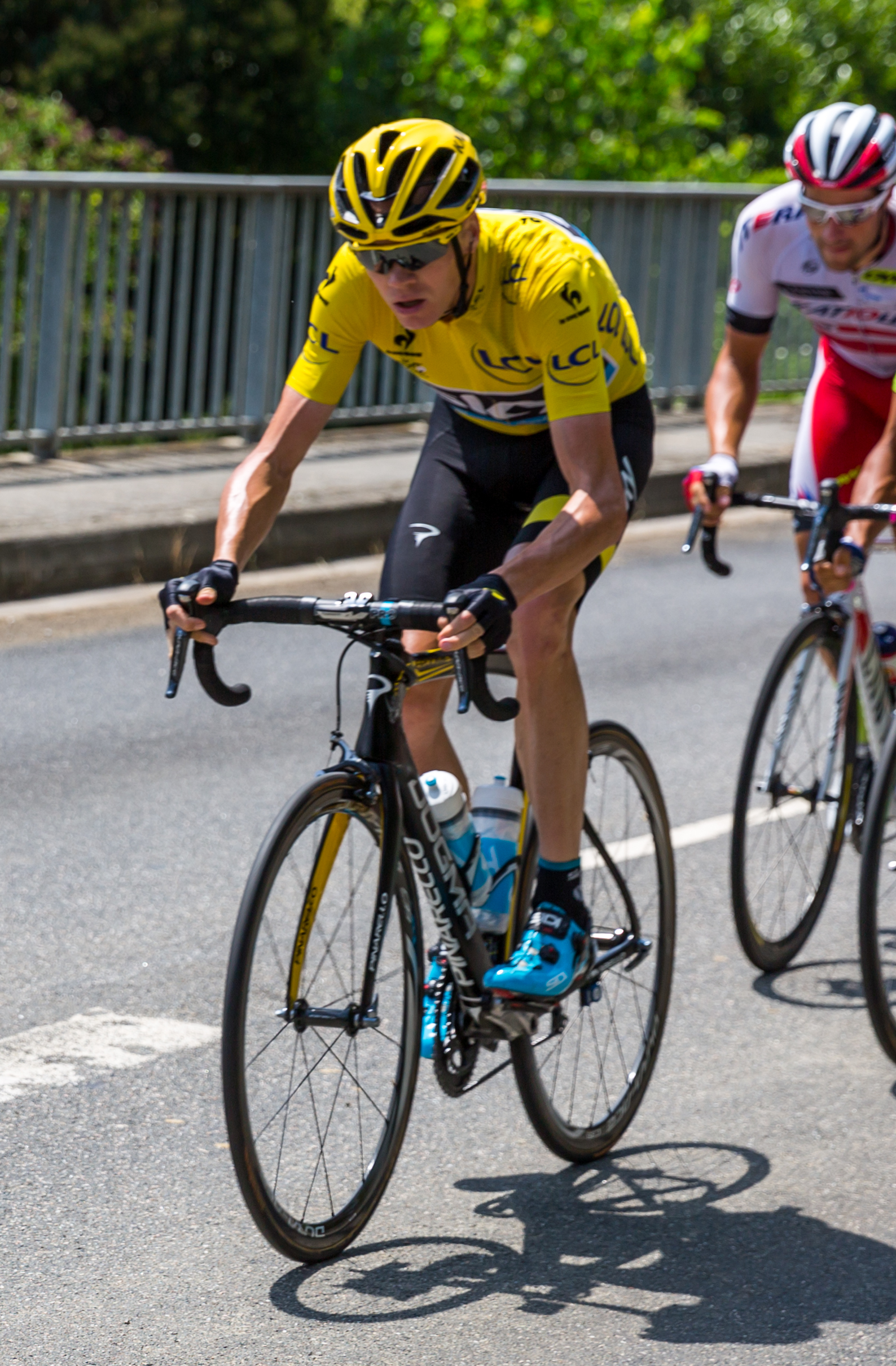
Chris Froome on stage 13 of the 2015 Tour de France, his second overall victory.

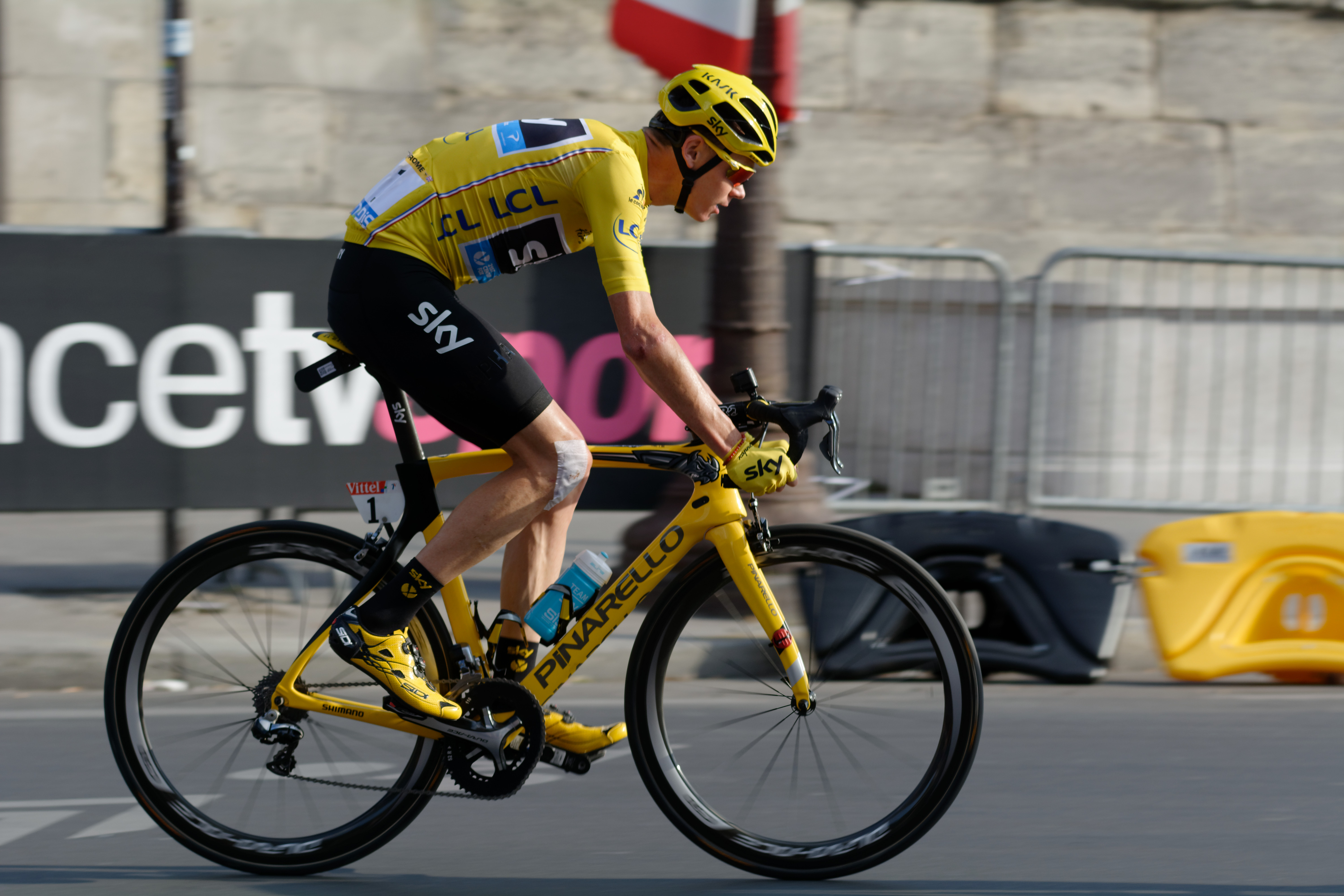
Froome on the Champs-Élysées during stage 21 of the 2016 Tour de France, en route to his third overall victory, the team's fourth and the first rider to defend the yellow jersey since Miguel Induráin

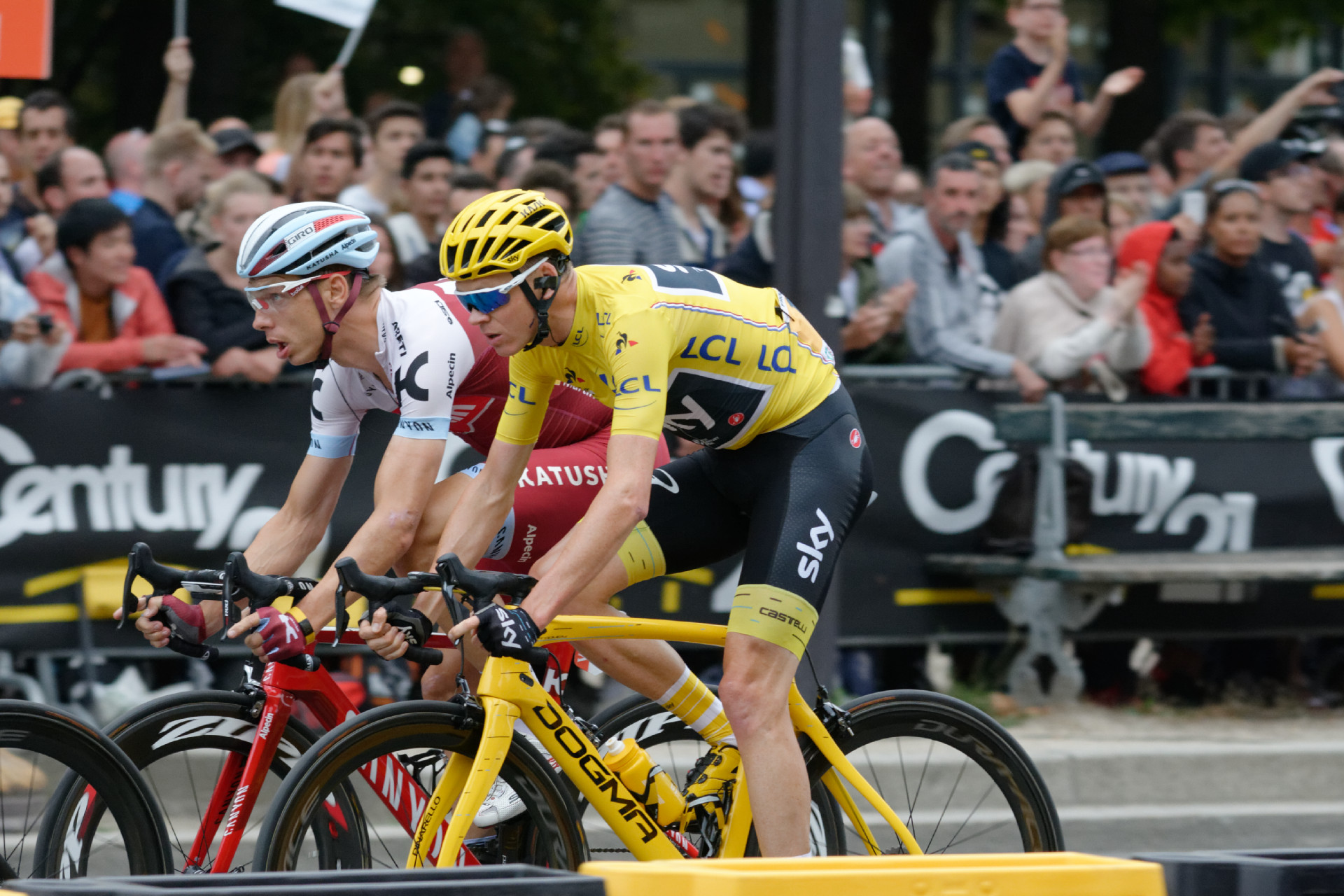
Froome en route to taking his fourth Tour victory, fifth overall for the team.

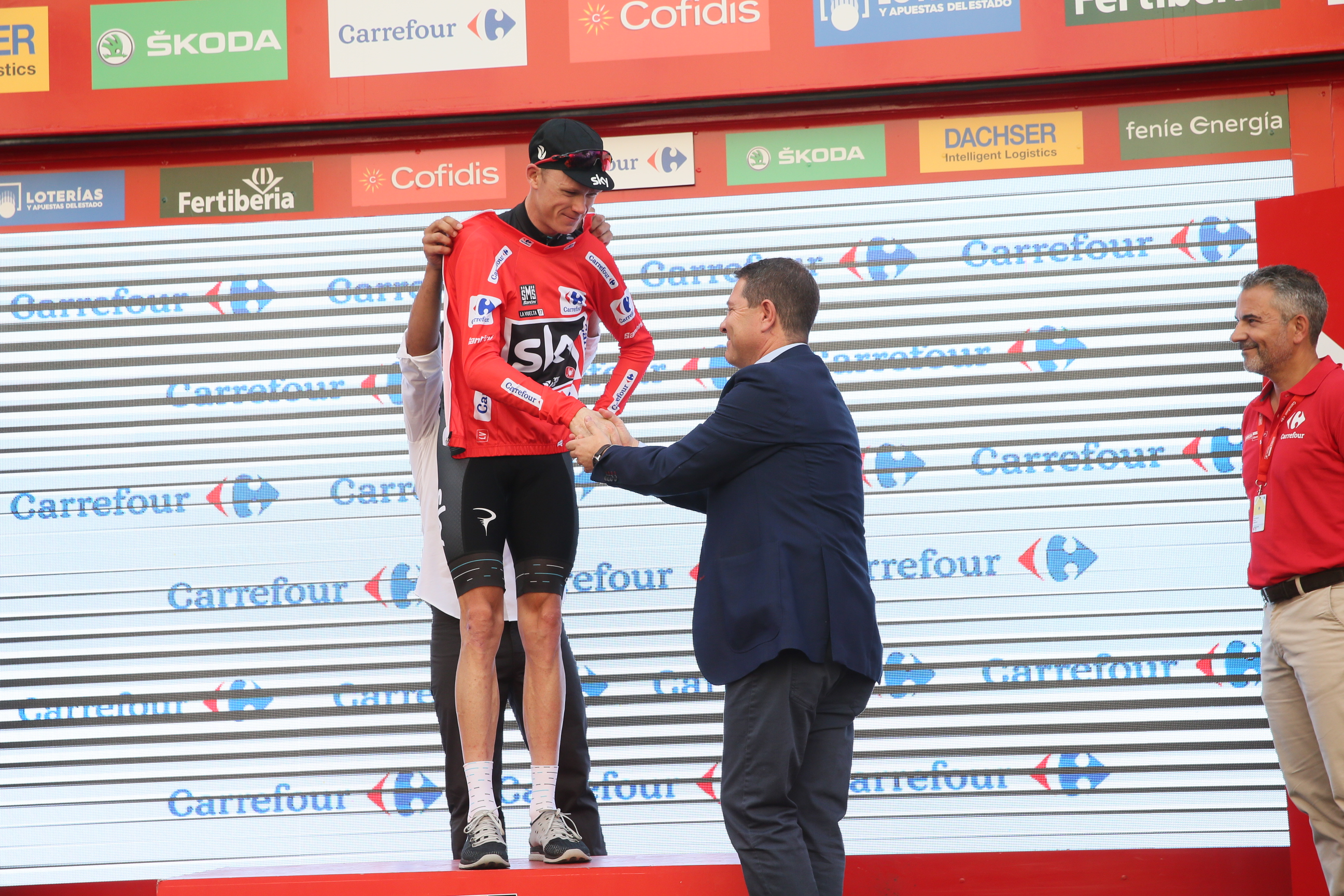
Froome receiving the red jersey of Vuelta leader after stage 7, a race he would go on to win.

Froome after taking the Maglia Rosa in the 2018 Giro d'Italia. A race he would go on to win, securing a career Grand Tour grand slam as well as a team grand slam for grand tour victories.

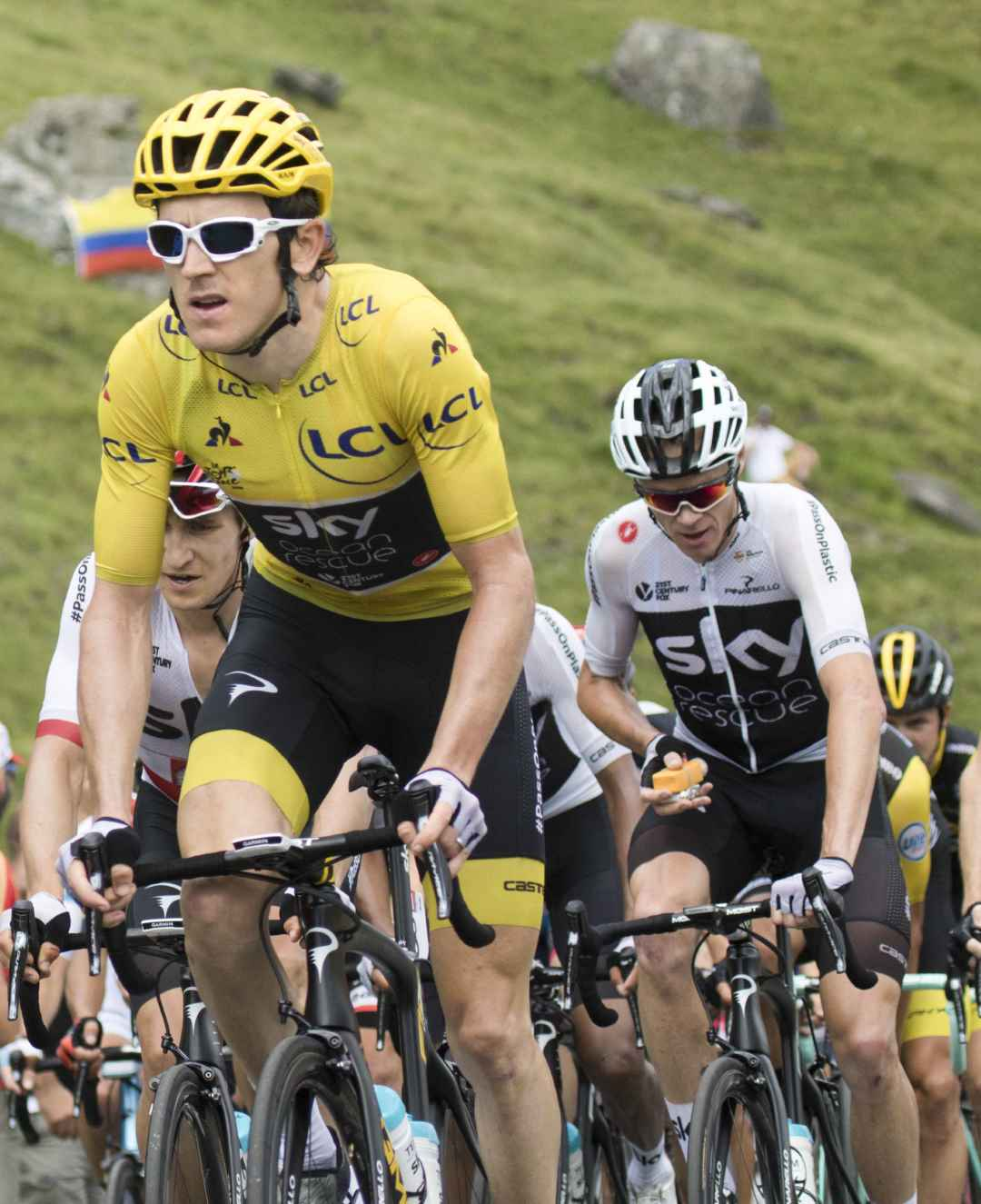
Geraint Thomas en route to victory in the 2018 Tour de France. This would mark Thomas' first grand tour overall win, the sixth win for the team and the third rider Team Sky rider to win. Thomas' win would also become the team's fourth consecutive grand tour victory as well as fourth consecutive Tour de France win.
