= 2018 Gran Premio Bruno Beghelli =

2018 UCI Europe Tour

Race details
- Dates: 7 October 2018
- Stages: 1
- Distance: 196.3 km (122.0 mi)
- Winning time: 4h 24' 45"

Results
	Winner	Bauke Mollema (NED)
	Second	Carlos Barbero (ESP)
	Third	Manuel Belletti (ITA)

The 2018 Gran Premio Bruno Beghelli was the 23rd edition of the Gran Premio Bruno Beghelli road cycling one day race. It was held on 7 October 2018 as part of UCI Europe Tour in category 1.HC.

== Teams ==
Twenty-four teams of up to seven riders started the race:

UCI WorldTeams

- Bahrain–Merida
- Trek–Segafredo
- AG2R La Mondiale
- Movistar Team
- Mitchelton–Scott
- Team Sky
- UAE Team Emirates
- EF Education First–Drapac p/b Cannondale
- LottoNL–Jumbo
- Astana
- Team Dimension Data
- Groupama–FDJ

UCI Professional Continental teams

- Bardiani–CSF
- Caja Rural–Seguros RGA
- Nippo–Vini Fantini–Europa Ovini
- Israel Cycling Academy
- Androni Giocattoli–Sidermec
- Wilier Triestina–Selle Italia
- Gazprom–RusVelo

UCI Continental team

- Amore & Vita–Prodir
- Sangemini–MG.K Vis Vega
- MsTina–Focus
- Biesse–Carrera Gavardo

National team

- Italy

== Result ==
Final general classification

Rank	Rider	Team	Time
1	Bauke Mollema (NED)	Trek–Segafredo	4h 24' 45"
2	Carlos Barbero (ESP)	Movistar Team	+ 6"
3	Manuel Belletti (ITA)	Androni Giocattoli–Sidermec	s.t.
4	Juan José Lobato (ESP)	Nippo–Vini Fantini–Europa Ovini	s.t.
5	Riccardo Minali (ITA)	Astana	s.t.
6	Matteo Trentin (ITA)	Mitchelton–Scott	s.t.
7	Leonardo Basso (ITA)	Team Sky	s.t.
8	Mathieu Ladagnous (FRA)	Groupama–FDJ	s.t.
9	Koen Bouwman (NED)	LottoNL–Jumbo	s.t.
10	Kristian Sbaragli (ITA)	Israel Cycling Academy	s.t.
