= 2011 Kuurne–Brussels–Kuurne =

Race details
- Dates: 27 February
- Stages: 1
- Distance: 193 km (119.9 mi)
- Winning time: 4h 39' 39"

Results
	Winner	Christopher Sutton (AUS)	(Team Sky)
	Second	Yauheni Hutarovich (BLR)	(FDJ)
	Third	André Greipel (GER)	(Omega Pharma–Lotto)

The 2011 Kuurne–Brussels–Kuurne took place on 27 February 2011, a day after Omloop Het Nieuwsblad. It was the 64th edition of the international classic Kuurne–Brussels–Kuurne. Australian Chris Sutton won the race in a bunch sprint.

== Results ==
	Cyclist	Team	Time
1	Christopher Sutton (AUS)	Team Sky	4h 39' 39"
2	Yauheni Hutarovich (BLR)	FDJ	s.t.
3	André Greipel (GER)	Omega Pharma–Lotto	s.t.
4	Tyler Farrar (USA)	Garmin–Cervélo	s.t.
5	Jonas Vangenechten (BEL)	Wallonie Bruxelles–Crédit Agricole	s.t.
6	Sébastien Chavanel (FRA)	Team Europcar	s.t.
7	Anthony Ravard (FRA)	Ag2r–La Mondiale	s.t.
8	Edvald Boasson Hagen (NOR)	Team Sky	s.t.
9	Adrien Petit (FRA)	Cofidis	s.t.
10	Kristof Goddaert (BEL)	Ag2r–La Mondiale	s.t.
