= Revolution (cycling series) – Season 11 =

Season 11 of the Revolution track series is being competed from October 2013 to March 2014, across a range of venues; the National Cycling Centre in Manchester, the Sir Chris Hoy Velodrome in Glasgow and finally the Olympic Velodrome in London and will consist of 5 rounds.

== Rounds ==
Round	Location	Date
1	Manchester I	26 October 2013
2	Glasgow	30 November 2013
3	Manchester II	4 January 2014
4	Manchester III	1 February 2014
5	London	14–15 March 2014

== Championship Standings ==
After round 4 of 5

Position	Team	Points
1	Rudy Project RT	172
2	Rapha Condor-JLT	137
3	Team Sky	129
4	WD40	122
5	Telegraph All Stars	114

== Round 1 ==
=== Flying Lap ===
Position	Rider	Team	Time
1	Ed Clancy	Rapha Condor-JLT	13.358
2	Steven Burke	Telegraph All Stars	+ 0.212"
3	Andy Tennant	Madison-Genesis	+ 0.466"
4	John Dibben	Team Sky	+ 0.546"
5	Evan Carstens	Rouleur	+ 0.663"

=== Elimination Race ===
Position	Rider	Team
1	Luke Rowe	Team Sky
2	Jon Mould	Team USN
3	Owain Doull	Telegraph All Stars
4	Christian Grasman	Rudy Project RT
5	Sam Harrison	HMT-Sportscover

=== Points Race ===
Position	Rider	Team
1	Jon Mould	Team USN
2	Owain Doull	Revolution Allstars
3	Christian Grasman	Rudy Project RT
4	Adam Yates	Maxgear RT
5	Ed Clancy	Rapha Condor-JLT

=== 1km Madison TT ===
Position	Team	Time
1	Rapha Condor-JLT	56.001
2	Telegraph All Stars	+ 0.333"
3	Team Sky	+ 0.556"
4	Rouleur	+ 2.430"
5	Madison-Genesis	+ 2.475"

=== Scratch Race ===
Position	Rider	Team
1	Ed Clancy	Rapha Condor-JLT
2	Steven Burkel	Telegraph All Stars
3	Jake Ragan	Maxgear RT
4	Christian Grasman	Rudy Project RT
5	Ed Clancy	Rouleur

== Round 2 ==
=== Flying Lap ===
Position	Rider	Team	Time
1	Ross Edgar	Roleur	13.836
2	Nico Hesslich	Rudy Project RT	+ 0.014"
3	Chris Latham	WD40	+ 0.204"
4	Chris Lawless	Team Sky	+ 0.599"
5	James McCallum	Rapha Condor-JLT	+ 0.827"

=== Elimination Race ===
Position	Rider	Team
1	Jesper Asselman	Madison Genesis
2	Scott Jacob	HMT-Sportscover
3	Andreas Muller	Madison Genesis
4	Marcel Kalz	Rudy Project RT
5	Chris Latham	WD40

=== Points Race ===
Position	Rider	Team
1	Jake Ragan	Champion System/Club Roost RT
2	Marcel Kalz	Rudy Project RT
3	Wim Stroetinga	Telegraph All Stars
4	James McCallum	Rapha Condor-JLT
5	Julio Alberto Amores	Champion System/Club Roost RT

=== 1km Madison TT ===
Position	Team	Time
1	Rudy Project RT	55.472
2	WD40	+ 3.521"
3	Rapha Condor-JLT	+ 4.014"
4	Rouleur	+ 4.220"
5	Team Sky	+ 4.541"

=== Scratch Race ===
Position	Rider	Team
1	Marcel Kalz	Rudy Project RT
2	Wim Stroetinga	Telegraph All Stars
3	Chris Lawless	Team Sky
4	Germain Burton	Team Sky
5	Chris Latham	WD40

== Round 3 ==
=== Flying Lap ===
Position	Rider	Team	Time
1	Ed Clancy	Rapha Condor-JLT	13.208
2	Nico Hesslich	Rudy Project RT	+ 0.200"
3	Ross Edgar	Rouleur	+ 0.443"
4	Andy Tennant	Madison Genesis	+ 0.556"
5	Steven Burke	HMT-Sportscover	+ 0.645"

=== Team Elimination Race ===
Position	Rider	Team
1	Owain Doull & Chris Latham	WD40
2	Alex Dowsett & Adam Blythe	Telegraph All Stars
3	Christian Grasmann & Nico Hesslich	Rudy Project RT
4	Andy Tennant &Jermain Burton	Madison Genesis
5	Steven Burke &Jake Womersley	HMT-Sportscover

=== Points Race ===
Position	Rider	Team
1	Peter Kennaugh	Team Sky
2	Ed Clancy	Rapha Condor-JLT
3	Nico Hesslich	Rudy Project RT
4	Jon Mould	Team USN
5	Owain Doull	WD40

=== 1km Madison TT ===
Position	Team	Time
1	Rapha Condor-JLT	54.537
2	Rudy Project RT	+ 1.041"
3	Madison Genesis	+ 2.599"
4	WD40	+ 2.711"
5	Telegraph All Stars	+ 3.061"

=== Scratch Race ===
Position	Rider	Team
1	Ed Clancy	Rapha Condor-JLT
2	Christian Grasmann	Rudy Project RT
3	Owain Doull	WD40
4	Adam Blythe	Telegraph All Stars
5	Nico Hesslich	Rudy Project RT

== Round 4 ==
=== Flying Lap ===
Position	Rider	Team	Time
1	Ed Clancy	Rapha Condor-JLT	13.250
2	Steven Burke	HMT-Sportscover	+ 0.104"
3	Sam Harrison	Telegraph All Stars	+ 0.401"
4	Andy Tennant	Madison Genesis	+ 0.418"
5	Jon Mould	Team USN	+ 0.637"

=== Elimination Race ===
Position	Rider	Team
1	Jon Mould	Team USN
2	Ben Swift	Team Sky
3	Owain Doull	WD40
4	Christian Grasmann	Rudy Project RT
5	Yoeri Havrik	WD40

=== Points Race ===
Position	Rider	Team
1	Peter Kennaugh	Team Sky
2	Mark Stewart	Rapha Condor-JLT
3	George Atkins	Rapha Condor-JLT
4	Yoeri Havrik	WD40
5	Jon Mould	Team USN

=== 1km Madison TT ===
Position	Team	Time
1	Rapha Condor-JLT	54.446
2	Telegraph All Stars	+ 1.054"
3	Rudy Project RT	+ 2.536"
4	WD40	+ 3.818"
5	Team Sky	+ 3.860"

=== Scratch Race ===
Position	Rider	Team
1	Ben Swift	Team Sky
2	Evan Oliphant	Rouleur
3	Claudio Imhof	Rudy Project RT
4	Jon Mould	Team USN
5	Owen James	Team USN
