= Leonardo Basso =

Italian cyclist (born 1993)

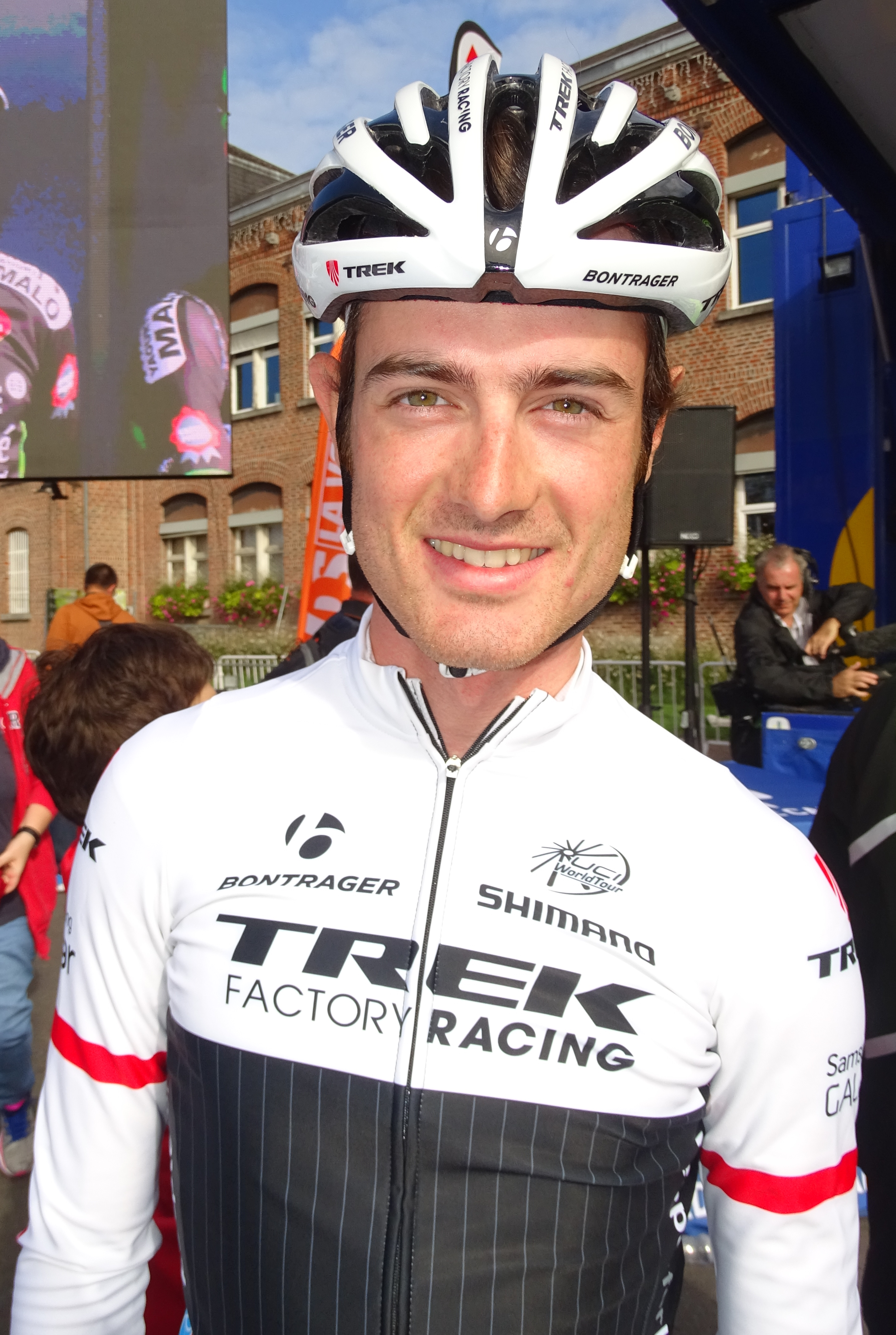
- Basso in 2015.

Personal information
- Full name: Leonardo Basso
- Born: 25 December 1993 (age 32) Castelfranco Veneto, Italy
- Height: 1.77 m (5 ft 9 1/2 in)
- Weight: 63 kg (139 lb; 9 st 13 lb)

Cycling career
- Sport: Cycling
- Discipline: Road
- Role: Rider

Amateur teams
- 2012–2014: Zalf–Euromobil–Désirée–Fior
- 2015–2016: Selle Italia–Cieffe–Ursus
- 2017: General Store Bottoli Zardini

Professional teams
- 2015: Trek Factory Racing (stagiaire)
- 2018–2021: Team Sky
- 2022–2023: Astana Qazaqstan Team

Leonardo Basso (born 25 December 1993) is an Italian cyclist, who most recently rode for UCI WorldTeam Astana Qazaqstan Team.

== Major results ==
2013
7th Giro del Medio Brenta
2015
1st Gran Premio Industria e Commercio Artigianato Carnaghese
1st Trofeo Gavardo Tecmor
5th Trofeo Alcide Degasperi
10th Overall Tour of Hainan
10th Trofeo Città di San Vendemiano
2017
7th Trofeo Città di Brescia
2018
1st Stage 1b (TTT) Settimana Internazionale di Coppi e Bartali
5th Coppa Bernocchi
7th Gran Premio Bruno Beghelli
9th Trofeo Campos, Porreres, Felanitx, Ses Salines
9th Trofeo Palma
