= Christian Knees =

German road bicycle racer

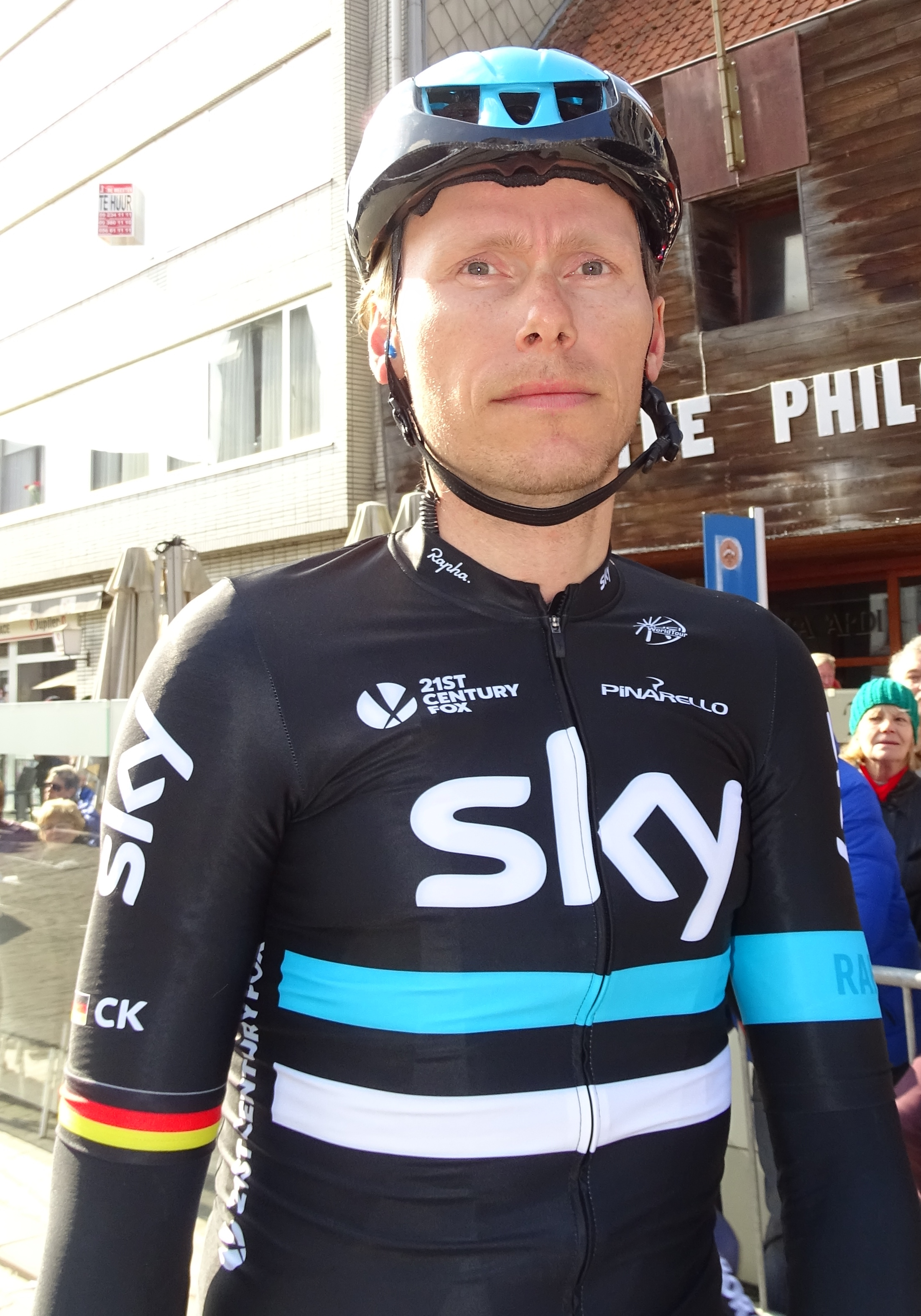
- Knees at the 2016 Nokere Koerse.

Personal information
- Full name: Christian Knees
- Born: 5 March 1981 (age 45) Bonn, West Germany
- Height: 1.94 m (6 ft 4 in)
- Weight: 81 kg (179 lb)

Cycling career
- Sport: Cycling
- Current team: Retired
- Discipline: Road
- Role: Rider
- Rider type: Rouleur

Professional teams
- 2004–2005: Wiesenhof
- 2006–2010: Team Milram
- 2011–2020: Team Sky

Major wins
- Grand Tours Giro d'Italia 1 TTT stage (2013) Vuelta a España 1 TTT stage (2016) Stage races Bayern Rundfahrt (2008) One-day Races and Classics National Road Race Championships (2010)

Christian Knees (born 5 March 1981) is a German former professional road racing cyclist, who rode professionally between 2004 and 2020, for the Wiesenhof, Team Milram and INEOS Grenadiers teams. He won the German National Road Race Championship in 2010. In 2011 he was originally going to join the Australian team known as Pegasus but left after they failed to secure a UCI Professional Continental license. He ultimately joined Team Sky as a domestique. He remained with the team as a rider until announcing his retirement from the sport in December 2020, moving into a role within the team's racing and performance areas.

== Major results ==
2001
3rd Overall Rás Tailteann

1st Stage 5

2004
6th Overall The Peace Race

1st Young rider classification

6th Overall Ytong Bohemia Tour
7th Grote Prijs Stad Zottegem
7th Rund um Düren
7th Alpbach Rad Classic
2005
2nd Overall Sachsen-Tour
4th Grand Prix Pino Cerami
6th Overall Ster Elektrotoer
7th Overall Tour de Luxembourg
7th Overall Hessen Rundfahrt
8th Ronde van Drenthe
2006
1st Rund um Köln
4th Overall 3-Länder-Tour
2007
2nd Road race, National Road Championships
3rd Eindhoven Team Time Trial
2008
1st Overall Bayern Rundfahrt
2nd Sparkassen Giro Bochum
5th Rund um den Henninger Turm
9th Overall Tour de Suisse
2009
3rd Rund um den Henninger Turm
8th Brabantse Pijl
10th Overall Tour of the Basque Country
10th Gran Premio di Lugano
10th Amstel Gold Race
2010
1st Road race, National Road Championships
2012
7th Overall Bayern Rundfahrt
9th Overall Tour of Britain
2013
1st Stage 2 (TTT) Giro d'Italia
1st Stage 1b (TTT) Giro del Trentino
2016
1st Stage 1 (TTT) Vuelta a España
2019
1st Mountains classification Herald Sun Tour

=== Grand Tour general classification results timeline ===
Grand Tour	2006	2007	2008	2009	2010	2011	2012	2013	2014	2015	2016	2017	2018	2019
Giro d'Italia	73	72	—	—	—	—	—	59	—	—	66	—	91	96
Tour de France	102	47	27	19	91	64	82	—	—	—	—	144	—	—
Vuelta a España	—	—	—	43	—	—	—	—	DNF	91	124	124	—	—

Legend
—	Did not compete
DNF	Did not finish
