= Christopher Sutton (cyclist) =

Australian road bicycle racer

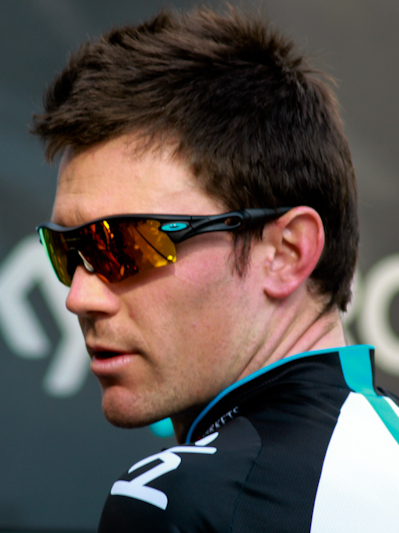
- Sutton at the 2011 Tour de Romandie

Personal information
- Full name: Christopher Sutton
- Nickname: CJ
- Born: 10 September 1984 (age 42) Caringbah, Sydney, Australia
- Height: 1.76 m (5 ft 9 in)
- Weight: 67 kg (148 lb)

Cycling career
- Sport: Cycling
- Current team: Retired
- Discipline: Road
- Role: Rider
- Rider type: Sprinter

Professional teams
- 2005–2007: Cofidis
- 2008–2009: Slipstream–Chipotle
- 2010–2015: Team Sky

Major wins
- Vuelta a España, 1 Stage; Giro d'Italia, 1 Stage TTT; Kuurne-Brussel-Kuurne (2011); Herald Sun Tour, 3 Stages; Cholet-Pays de Loire (2006); Delta Tour Zeeland (2008); Bay Classic Series (2010)

Christopher Sutton (born 10 September 1984) is an Australian former professional cyclist from Australia, who rode professionally between 2005 and 2015 for the Cofidis, Garmin–Slipstream and Team Sky squads.

Born in Caringbah, Sydney, New South Wales, Sutton trained as a carpenter. He is the son of NSW Institute of Sport's head cycling coach, Gary Sutton, and nephew of British Cycling track coach, Shane Sutton; both ex-professional cyclists. He began cycling at the age of 11, and turned professional in 2005, riding the UCI ProTour for the Cofidis team. For the 2008 season, Sutton signed with Slipstream–Chipotle, later renamed Garmin–Chipotle p/b H30. In 2010 he moved to the newly formed Team Sky, departing at the end of the 2015 season. He lives in Sylvania, New South Wales.

== Major results ==
2003
1st Stage 5 Bay Classic Series
2004
1st Points race, National Track Championships
2005
1st Road race, National Under-23 Road Championships
1st Madison, National Track Championships
1st Gran Premio della Liberazione
1st Coppa G. Romita
5th Road race, UCI Under-23 Road World Championships
2006
1st Cholet-Pays de Loire
2007
1st Châteauroux Classic
1st Stage 4 Circuit Cycliste Sarthe
1st Stage 1 Tour du Poitou-Charentes
2008
1st Overall Delta Tour Zeeland
1st Stage 1 (TTT) Giro d'Italia
4th Overall Tour of Qatar
2009
2nd Overall Herald Sun Tour

1st Stages 2, 3 & 4

2nd Overall Tour of Britain

1st Stage 1

2010
1st Overall Bay Classic Series
1st Stage 3 Brixia Tour
1st Stage 6 Tour Down Under
2nd Down Under Classic
4th Road race, Commonwealth Games
2011
1st Kuurne–Brussels–Kuurne
1st Stage 2 Vuelta a España
3rd Overall Tour de Wallonie-Picarde

1st Stage 2

10th Paris–Bourges
2013
9th Le Samyn
9th RideLondon–Surrey Classic
2014
1st Japan Cup Criterium
4th Down Under Classic
2015
4th Down Under Classic
