= Salvatore Puccio =

Italian racing cyclist

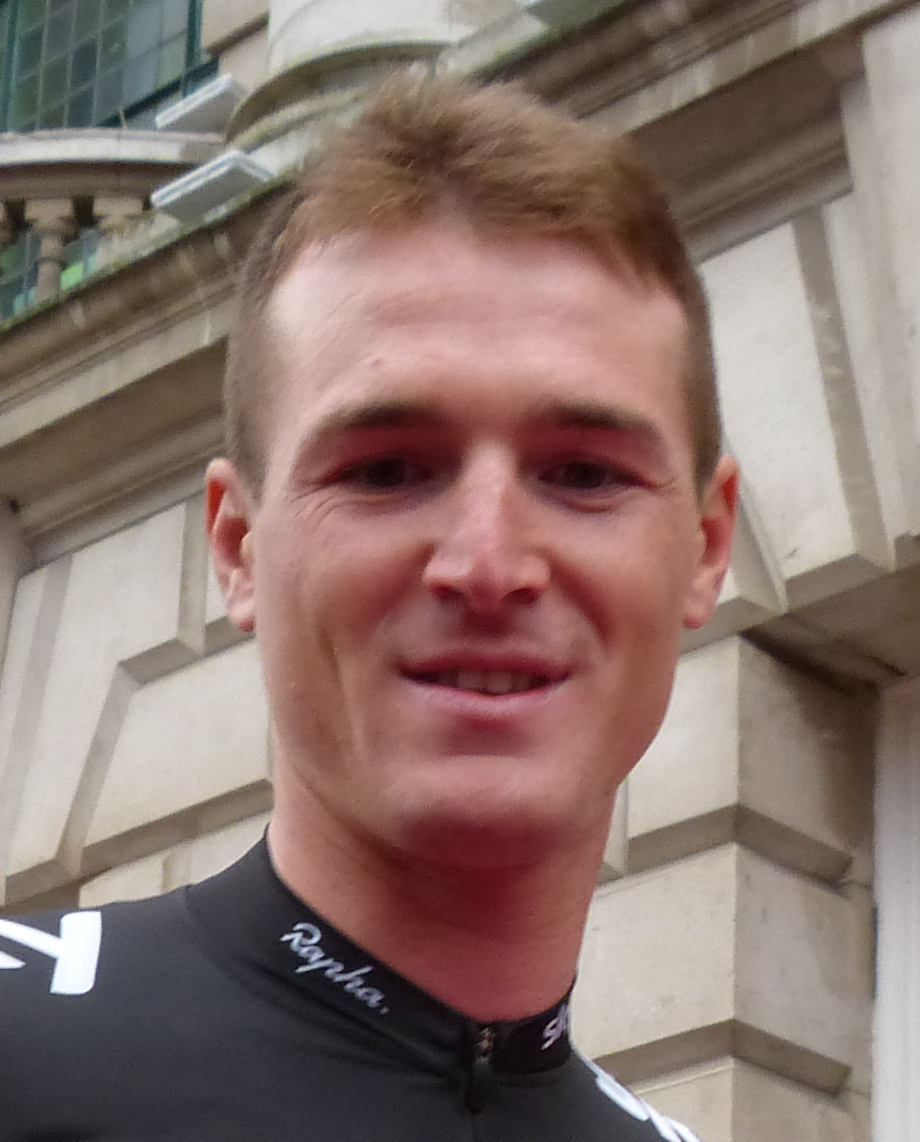
- Puccio in 2014

Personal information
- Full name: Salvatore Puccio
- Born: 31 August 1989 (age 37) Menfi, Italy
- Height: 1.82 m (5 ft 11 1/2 in)
- Weight: 68 kg (150 lb)

Cycling career
- Sport: Cycling
- Discipline: Road
- Role: Rider
- Rider type: Rouleur; Domestique

Professional team
- 2012–2025: Team Sky

Major wins
- Grand Tours Giro d'Italia 1 TTT stage (2013) Vuelta a España 1 TTT stage (2016)

Salvatore Puccio (born 31 August 1989) is an Italian former racing cyclist. A professional from 2012 to 2025, he spent his entire career riding for UCI WorldTeam Netcompany–Ineos. As a domestique, he rode 17 Grand Tours and made 30 appearances across all five Monuments.

== Career ==
Salvatore Puccio in first (time trial) stage Tour of Slovenia 2015.

Puccio was born at Menfi, in Sicily. He joined Team Sky ahead of the 2012 season, after a 2011 season which included a solo victory in the under-23 Tour of Flanders race in April.

Puccio made his Grand Tour debut at the 2013 Giro d'Italia. After Team Sky won the team time trial on stage two, Puccio took the race lead and wore the pink jersey on stage three, after being the highest placed Team Sky rider on stage one. Puccio kicked off his season in 2018 with an entry in the Tour Down Under.

== Major results ==
2007
5th Overall Giro della Toscana Junior

1st Points classification
1st Stage 2

5th Overall Giro della Lunigiana
2010
5th GP Pretola
5th Gran Premio San Giuseppe
6th Gran Premio Industrie del Marmo
9th Trofeo Edil C
2011
1st Ronde van Vlaanderen U23
2nd GP Pretola
2nd Giro del Belvedere
2nd Gran Premio Palio del Recioto
4th Overall Giro della Toscana

1st Stage 3

4th Trofeo Banca Popolare di Vicenza
5th GP Capodarco
2012
6th Trofeo Deià
2013
Giro d'Italia

1st Stage 2 (TTT)
Held after Stage 2

2014
8th Gran Premio Città di Camaiore
2015
7th Overall Tour of Slovenia

1st Points classification (Note: In October 2015, Davide Appollonio was stripped of his race results, following his suspension after a positive doping test for erythropoietin (EPO). As a consequence, Puccio was retroactively promoted one position in the standings.)

2016
1st Stage 1 (TTT) Vuelta a España

=== Grand Tour general classification results timeline ===
Grand Tour	2013	2014	2015	2016	2017	2018	2019	2020	2021	2022	2023
Giro d'Italia	73	98	68	—	86	64	86	56	94	85	72
Tour de France	Has not contested during his career										
Vuelta a España	DNF	—	77	121	78	96	89	—	98	—	—

Legend
—	Did not compete
DNF	Did not finish
