= Sebastián Henao =

Colombian road cyclist

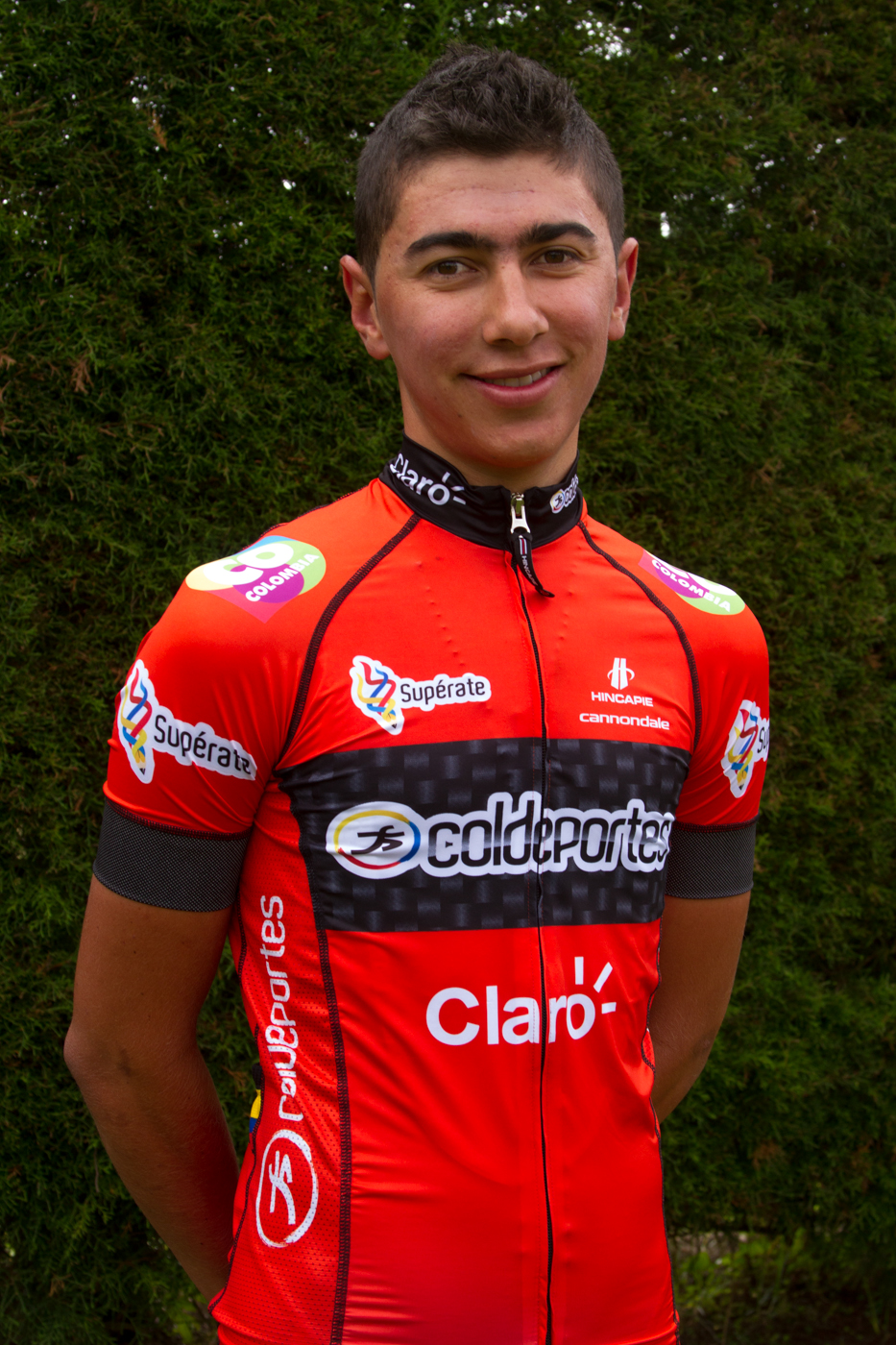
- Henao in 2013.

Personal information
- Full name: Sebastián Henao Gómez
- Born: August 5, 1993 (age 33) Rionegro, Colombia
- Height: 1.71 m (5 ft 7 in)
- Weight: 57 kg (126 lb)

Cycling career
- Sport: Cycling
- Discipline: Road
- Role: Rider
- Rider type: Climber

Professional teams
- 2012: Gobernación de Antioquia
- 2013: Coldeportes–Claro
- 2014–2021: Team Sky
- 2022: Astana Qazaqstan Team

Sebastián Henao Gómez (born 5 August 1993) is a Colombian cyclist, who last rode for UCI WorldTeam XDS Astana Team. He is the cousin of fellow professional cyclist Sergio Henao, who also rode with Sebastián at Team Sky between 2014 and 2018. In August 2019, he was named in the startlist for the 2019 Vuelta a España. Henao announced he was suspending his career on 1 August 2022 due to health problems.

== Major results ==
2011
2nd Overall Vuelta del Porvenir de Colombia

1st Stage 3

3rd Overall Vuelta de la Juventud de Colombia
2012
2nd Overall Clásica Marinilla
4th Overall Clásica Ciudad de Girardot
2013
1st Overall Clásica de Funza

1st Stage 1

1st Young rider classification Vuelta a Colombia
3rd Overall Vuelta de la Juventud de Colombia
2015
3rd Overall Tour de Langkawi
7th Japan Cup
9th Overall Tour de l'Avenir
2016
5th Overall Settimana Internazionale di Coppi e Bartali
6th Overall Arctic Race of Norway
2018
8th Overall Vuelta a Burgos
2021
8th Overall Volta ao Algarve

=== Grand Tour general classification results timeline ===
Grand Tour	2014	2015	2016	2017	2018	2019
Giro d'Italia	22	41	17	33	—	24
Tour de France	Has not contested during his career					
Vuelta a España	—	—	—	—	—	39
