= Xabier Zandio =

Spanish cyclist

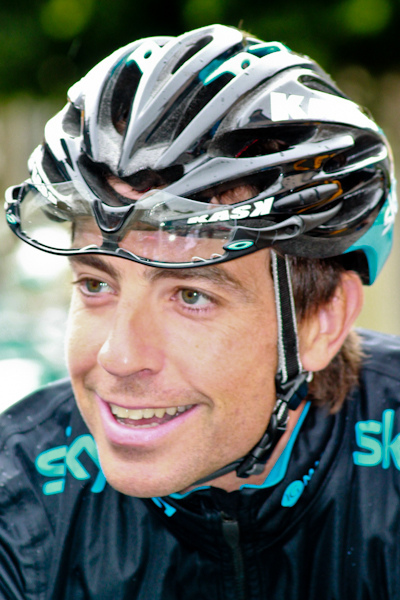
- Zandio at the 2011 Critérium du Dauphiné.

Personal information
- Full name: Xabier Zandio Echaide
- Born: 17 March 1977 (age 49) Pamplona, Spain
- Height: 1.84 m (6 ft 0 in)
- Weight: 73 kg (161 lb)

Cycling career
- Sport: Cycling
- Discipline: Road
- Role: Rider
- Rider type: Climbing Domestique

Professional teams
- 2001–2010: iBanesto.com
- 2011–2016: Team Sky

Major wins
- Grand Tours Giro d'Italia 1 TTT stage (2013) Stage races Vuelta a Burgos (2008)

Xabier Zandio Echaide (born 17 March 1977) is a retired Spanish professional road bicycle racer who last rode for UCI ProTeam Team Sky.

== Biography ==
Born in Pamplona, Zandio grew up in a sporting family—one brother is a footballer and another a pelota player—and decided at the age of 17 to become a cyclist rather than work for his parents' butchery business.

He began his professional career in 2001 with the iBanesto.com team (which was renamed Illes Balears–Banesto in 2004, and Illes Balears–Caisse d'Epargne in 2005). After a difficult 2004 season in which injuries drained him physically and emotionally, he returned with a strong performance in the 2005 Tour de France. Finishing in 22nd place overall, he managed 4th in the 18th stage, and 2nd in the 16th, behind Óscar Pereiro.

He currently resides in Pamplona and is married with two children.

In September 2015 Zandio announced that he would retire from the sport at the end of the 2016 season after he signed a one-year contract extension with Team Sky.

== Major results ==
2002
1st Stage 1 (TTT) Volta a Portugal
2005
1st Clásica a los Puertos de Guadarrama
6th Overall Volta a la Comunitat Valenciana
22nd Overall Tour de France
2008
1st Overall Vuelta a Burgos
2013
1st Stage 2 (TTT) Giro d'Italia
1st Stage 1b (TTT) Giro del Trentino
