= List of men's road bicycle races =

This is a list of important men's road bicycle racing events. The list only includes road races, and no track, mountain or cyclo-cross races.

== Championships ==
- UCI World Tour, used to be UCI ProTour
- Five UCI Continental Circuits (Africa, America, Asia, Europe and Oceania)
- World Championships
- National Championships

== One-day races ==
The Monuments, Elite and 1.HC One Day Races include races that are either part of the UCI World Tour, as well as races that are organized by the ASO, the RCS and Unipublic.

=== The 'Monument' Classics ===
- Milano–San Remo, Italy
- Tour of Flanders, Belgium
- Paris–Roubaix, France
- Liège–Bastogne–Liège, Belgium
- Giro di Lombardia, Italy

=== Additional elite one-day races ===
- Omloop Het Nieuwsblad, Belgium, formerly known as Omloop Het Volk
- Strade Bianche, Italy
- Cadel Evans Great Ocean Road Race, Australia
- E3 Harelbeke, Belgium
- Gent–Wevelgem, Belgium
- Dwars door Vlaanderen, Belgium
- La Flèche Wallonne, Belgium
- Amstel Gold Race (men's race), Netherlands
- Eschborn–Frankfurt, Germany
- Clásica de San Sebastián, Spain
- Bretagne Classic, France
- Vattenfall Cyclassics, Germany
- GP de Quebec. Canada
- GP de Montréal, Canada

=== Major UCI Continental Circuits one-day races (1.Pro) ===
- Trofeo Laigueglia, Italy (1.HC in 2015)
- Kuurne–Brussels–Kuurne, Belgium
- GP di Lugano, Switzerland
- Nokere Koerse, Belgium
- Scheldeprijs, Belgium
- Brabantse Pijl, Belgium (1.HC in 2011)
- GP de Denain, France
- GP of Aargau Canton, Switzerland
- RideLondon–Surrey Classic, United Kingdom
- Brussels Cycling Classic, Belgium (formerly Paris–Bruxelles)
- GP du Fourmies, France
- GP Impanis-Van Petegem, Belgium
- Giro dell'Emilia, Italy
- GP Bruno Beghelli, Italy
- Tre Valli Varesine, Italy
- Milano–Torino, Italy
- Gran Piemonte, Italy
- Münsterland Giro, Germany
- Paris–Tours, France
- Japan Cup, Japan

=== Other Continental Circuit one-day races (1.1 or 1.2) ===
- Rund um Köln, Germany
- Arnhem–Veenendaal Classic, Netherlands, formerly known as Veenendaal–Veenendaal (1.HC from 2005 until 2010)
- Escalada a Montjuïc, Spain
- GP d'Ouverture La Marseillaise, France
- Vuelta a Murcia, Spain (a 2.1 stage race until 2012)
- GP della Costa Etruschi, Italy
- Klasika Primavera, Spain
- Melbourne to Warrnambool Classic, Australia
- Ronde van Drenthe, Netherlands
- GP Miguel Induráin, Spain (1.HC from 2007 until 2012)
- Philadelphia International Championship, United States ( 1.HC from 2005 until 2012)
- Volta Limburg Classic, Netherlands, formerly known as Hel van het Mergelland
- Memorial Marco Pantani, Italy
- Rund um die Hainleite, Germany
- Subida a Urkiola, Spain
- Trofeo Mallorca, Spain
- Clásica de Almería, Spain (1.HC in 2012 and 2013)
- Beaumont Trophy, United Kingdom
- Rutland–Melton International CiCLE Classic, United Kingdom
- Tour of Almaty, Kazakhstan
- Rhodes GP, Greece
- Tour de Vendée, France (1.HC from 2010 until 2013)
- Nationale Sluitingsprijs, Belgium
- Chrono des Nations, France, time trial

=== Defunct ===
(year is last edition)

- Lancaster Classic, United States (2007)
- GP Gerrie Knetemann, Netherlands
- Bordeaux–Paris, France (1988)
- Classique des Alpes, France (2004)
- Eindhoven Team Time Trial, Netherlands (2007)
- GP di Lugano, Switzerland, (1979) as an ITT, being since then a one-day race
- GP des Amériques, Canada, (1992)
- GP des Nations, France (2004)
- GP Wolber, France, (1931)
- Paris–Brest–Paris, France, (1951) (continues as an amateur ultra-marathon endurance event)
- Paris–Clermont-Ferrand, France, (1953)
- Paris–Rouen (first cycling race), France, (1869)
- San Francisco Grand Prix, United States, (2005)
- Reading Classic, United States (2006–2008)
- Trofeo Baracchi, Italy, (1991)
- Wincanton Classic, United Kingdom, (1997)
- Giro del Lazio, Italy (2014)
- Delta Profronde, Netherlands
- Züri-Metzgete, Switzerland (2006) (continuing in 2008 as an amateur event)
- Coppa Placci, Italy (2008)
- Giro del Veneto, Italy (1.HC from 2005 until 2009)

== Stage races ==
The Grand Tours, Elite and 2.HC Stage Races include races that are part of the UCI ProTour as well as races that are organized by the ASO, the RCS and Unipublic.

=== The Grand Tours ===
- Giro d'Italia, Italy
- Tour de France, France
- Vuelta a España, Spain

=== Additional elite stage races (world ranking) ===
- Tour Down Under, Australia
- Paris–Nice, France
- Tirreno–Adriatico, Italy
- Volta a Catalunya, Spain
- Vuelta al País Vasco (Tour of the Basque Country), Spain
- Tour de Romandie, Switzerland
- Critérium du Dauphiné, France
- Tour de Suisse, Switzerland
- Tour de Pologne, Poland
- Renewi Tour, Belgium, Netherlands

=== Major UCI Continental Circuit stage races (2.HC) ===
- Tour of Croatia, Croatia
- UAE Tour, UAE
- Tour of Rwanda, Rwanda (2.1)
- Tour of Qatar, Qatar
- Tour of Oman, Oman
- Tour de Langkawi, Malaysia
- Critérium International, France
- Three Days of De Panne, Belgium
- Giro del Trentino, Italy (2.HC since 2011)
- Tour of Turkey, Turkey (2.HC since 2010)
- Four Days of Dunkirk, France
- Tour of California, United States
- Tour of Norway, Norway
- Tour of Belgium, Belgium
- Tour de Luxembourg, Luxembourg
- Tour of Qinghai Lake, China
- Tour de Wallonie, Belgium
- Danmark Rundt, Denmark
- Tour of Utah, United States (2.HC in 2015)
- Vuelta a Burgos, Spain
- Arctic Race of Norway, Norway
- Tour of Britain Men's, United Kingdom
- Deutschland Tour, Germany

=== Other UCI Continental Circuit stage races (2.1 or 2.2) ===
- Herald Sun Tour, Australia
- Tour of Rwanda, Rwanda (2.1)
- Tour of Austria, Austria (2.HC from 2006)
- Tour of Greece, Greece (2.1 from 2022)
- Volta a Portugal, Portugal (2.HC from 2005 until 2009)
- Brixia Tour, Italy
- Hong Kong Road Cycling Race, Hong Kong, China
- An Post Rás, Ireland
- Route du Sud, France
- Giro di Sicilia, Italy
- Setmana Catalana de Ciclisme, Spain
- Settimana Internazionale di Coppi e Bartali, Italy
- Ster Elektrotoer, Netherlands
- Tour de Beauce, Canada
- Tour de l'Avenir, France
- Tour of Slovenia, Slovenia
- Tour of Sibiu, Romania
- Tour de Singkarak, Indonesia
- Tour of South China Sea, China, Hong Kong, China, Macau, China
- Tour of Iran (Azerbaijan), Iran
- Vuelta a Colombia, Colombia
- Vuelta a Asturias, Spain
- Vuelta a Castilla y León, Spain
- Vuelta a Andalucía, Spain
- Volta a la Comunitat Valenciana, Spain
- World Ports Classic, Belgium
- Tour of Estonia, Estonia
- Tour de Yorkshire, United Kingdom
- Tour du Limousin, France (2.HC in 2011 and 2012)
- Okolo Slovenska, Slovakia
- Tour of Rhodes, Greece (2.2)
- South Aegean Tour, Greece (2.2)
- La Tropicale Amissa Bongo, Gabon
- Tour Internationale d'Oranie, Algeria
- Tour de Blida, Algeria
- Tour du Cameroun, Cameroon
- Tour International de Sétif, Algeria
- Tour d'Annaba, Algeria
- Tour de Constantine, Algeria
- Tour du Maroc, Morocco
- Tour of Eritrea, Eritrea
- Tour du Sénégal, Senegal
- Tour de Tunisie, Tunisia
- Tour Ethiopian Meles Zenawi, Ethiopia
- Tour de Côte d'Ivoire-Tour de la Réconciliation, Ivory Coast
- Grand Prix Chantal Biya, Cameroon
- Tour du Faso, Burkina Faso

=== Other stage races ===
- Tour de Perth, Australia

=== Defunct ===
(year is last edition)

- (Canada) Tour of Alberta (2017)
- (China) Tour of Beijing (2014)
- (Germany) Deutschland Tour (2008) (revived in 2018)
- (Germany) (Poland) (Czech Republic) Course de la Paix (2006)
- (France) Grand Prix des Nations (2004)
- (France) Grand Prix du Midi Libre (2004)
- Petit Tour de France/Ronde de France (1946)
  (Little Tour de France, held during and shortly after WW2)
- (Republic of Ireland) Tour of Ireland (2009)
- (Germany) Bayern Rundfahrt (2015)
- (Italy) Giro di Padania (2012)
- (Italy) Rome–Naples–Rome (1961)
- (Netherlands) Ronde van Nederland (2004) (succeeded by the Eneco Tour)
- (Spain) Catalan Cycling Week (2005)
- (Spain) Euskal Bizikleta (was integrated into the Vuelta al País Vasco)
- (Spain) Vuelta a Galicia (2000)
- (United States) Coors Classic (1988) (succeeded by the Tour de Trump)
- (United States) Tour de Trump (1990) (succeeded by the Tour DuPont)
- (United States) Tour DuPont (1996)
- (United States) Tour of Missouri
- (United States) Tour de Georgia
- (United States) USA Pro Cycling Challenge (2015)
- (United States) Colorado Classic (2018) — continuing as a standalone women's race
- (United Arab Emirates) Abu Dhabi Tour (2018) (merged with Dubai Tour to become UAE Tour in 2019)
- (United Arab Emirates) Dubai Tour (2018) (merged with Abu Dhabi Tour to become UAE Tour in 2019)

== Multiple day, single stage races ==
- Race Across America, United States 9 day single stage 4,800 km (3,000 mi)
- TransAm Bicycle Race, United States 17-day single stage, unsupported 7,100 km (4,400 mi)
- Transcontinental Race, European Union 7-10 day single stage, unsupported 3,200 to 4,200 km (2,000 to 2,600 mi)

== See also ==
- List of women's road bicycle races
