= UCI .HC road races =

The UCI 1.HC and UCI 2.HC were the second tier classification of road cycling races by the UCI, after the UCI World Tour (or its predecessor, the UCI ProTour). They are now replaced by the UCI ProSeries. The races were part of the various UCI Continental Circuits. The 1.HC events were one-day races, whereas the 2.HC events were stage races. 'HC' stands for the French phrase hors catégorie, which means beyond categorization. In 2020, the .HC races were replaced by the UCI ProSeries

== Team participation ==
In .HC events, UCI WorldTeams may participate, up to a maximum of 70%. The rest of the teams participating may be UCI Professional Continental teams, UCI continental teams and National teams.

== List of 1.HC events ==
Race	Country	UCI Tour	Years
Cadel Evans Great Ocean Road Race^{↑}	Australia	UCI Oceania Tour	2016
Brabantse Pijl	Belgium	UCI Europe Tour	2011–2019
Bredene Koksijde Classic	Belgium	UCI Europe Tour	2018–2019
Brussels Cycling Classic	Belgium	UCI Europe Tour	2005–2019
Dwars door Vlaanderen^{↑}	Belgium	UCI Europe Tour	2013–2016
E3 Harelbeke^{↑}	Belgium	UCI Europe Tour	2005–2011
Kuurne–Brussels–Kuurne	Belgium	UCI Europe Tour	2016–2019
Nokere Koerse	Belgium	UCI Europe Tour	2016–2019
Omloop Het Nieuwsblad^{↑}	Belgium	UCI Europe Tour	2005–2016
Primus Classic	Belgium	UCI Europe Tour	2015–2019
Scheldeprijs	Belgium	UCI Europe Tour	2005–2019
Tour de l'Eurométropole	Belgium	UCI Europe Tour	2017–2019
GP de Denain	France	UCI Europe Tour	2016–2019
GP de Fourmies	France	UCI Europe Tour	2005–2019
Paris–Tours	France	UCI Europe Tour	2008–2019
Tour de Vendée	France	UCI Europe Tour	2010–2013
Eschborn–Frankfurt^{↑}	Germany	UCI Europe Tour	2005–2014, 2016
Rund um Köln	Germany	UCI Europe Tour	2007
Sparkassen Münsterland Giro	Germany	UCI Europe Tour	2015–2019
London–Surrey Classic^{↑}	Great Britain	UCI Europe Tour	2014–2016
Coppa Placci	Italy	UCI Europe Tour	2005–2008
Giro del Lazio	Italy	UCI Europe Tour	2005–2008
Giro del Veneto	Italy	UCI Europe Tour	2005–2009
Giro dell'Emilia	Italy	UCI Europe Tour	2005–2019
GP Bruno Beghelli	Italy	UCI Europe Tour	2014–2019
GP Industria & Artigianato	Italy	UCI Europe Tour	2017–2019
GP Nobili Rubinetterie	Italy	UCI Europe Tour	2015
Gran Piemonte	Italy	UCI Europe Tour	2005–2006, 2008–2012, 2015–2016, 2018–2019
Milano–Torino	Italy	UCI Europe Tour	2005–2007, 2012–2019
Strade Bianche^{↑}	Italy	UCI Europe Tour	2015–2016
Tre Valli Varesine	Italy	UCI Europe Tour	2005–2019
Trofeo Laigueglia	Italy	UCI Europe Tour	2015–2019
Japan Cup	Japan	UCI Asia Tour	2008–2019
Ronde van Drenthe	Netherlands	UCI Europe Tour	2018–2019
Veenendaal–Veenendaal Classic	Netherlands	UCI Europe Tour	2005–2010
Clásica de Almería	Spain	UCI Europe Tour	2012–2013, 2018–2019
GP Miguel Induráin	Spain	UCI Europe Tour	2007–2012
GP di Lugano	Switzerland	UCI Europe Tour	2015–2017
GP du canton d'Argovie	Switzerland	UCI Europe Tour	2005–2010, 2014–2019
Philadelphia International Cycling Classic	United States	UCI America Tour	2005–2012
San Francisco Grand Prix	United States	UCI America Tour	2005

Key
^{↑}	Race was promoted to the UCI World Tour.

== List of 2.HC events ==
Race	Country	UCI Tour	Years
Tour Down Under^{↑}	Australia	UCI Oceania Tour	2005–2007
Tour of Austria	Austria	UCI Europe Tour	2006–2015
Belgium Tour	Belgium	UCI Europe Tour	2009–2019
Three Days of De Panne^{↑}	Belgium	UCI Europe Tour	2005–2018 (Note: In 2018, the Three Days of De Panne was categorized as a 1.HC one-day race.)
Tour de Wallonie	Belgium	UCI Europe Tour	2005–2019
Tour of Hainan	China	UCI Asia Tour	2009–2018
Tour of Qinghai Lake	China	UCI Asia Tour	2005–2019
Tour of Croatia	Croatia	UCI Europe Tour	2018
Peace Race	Czech Republic	UCI Europe Tour	2006
Danmark Rundt	Denmark	UCI Europe Tour	2005–2019
Critérium International	France	UCI Europe Tour	2005–2016
Four Days of Dunkirk	France	UCI Europe Tour	2005–2019
Tour du Limousin	France	UCI Europe Tour	2011–2012
Bayern Rundfahrt	Germany	UCI Europe Tour	2005–2015
Deutschland Tour	Germany	UCI Europe Tour	2019
Tour of Britain	Great Britain	UCI Europe Tour	2014–2019
Tour de Yorkshire	Great Britain	UCI Europe Tour	2019
Tour of the Alps	Italy	UCI Europe Tour	2011–2019
Tour de Luxembourg	Luxembourg	UCI Europe Tour	2005–2019
Tour de Langkawi	Malaysia	UCI Asia Tour	2012–2019
Arctic Race of Norway	Norway	UCI Europe Tour	2015–2019
Tour des Fjords	Norway	UCI Europe Tour	2018
Tour of Norway	Norway	UCI Europe Tour	2014–2019
Tour of Oman	Oman	UCI Asia Tour	2005–2019
Volta ao Algarve	Portugal	UCI Europe Tour	2017–2019
Volta a Portugal	Portugal	UCI Europe Tour	2005–2009
Tour of Qatar	Qatar	UCI Asia Tour	2012–2016
Tour of Slovenia	Slovenia	UCI Europe Tour	2019
Euskal Bizikleta	Spain	UCI Europe Tour	2005–2008
Setmana Catalana de Ciclisme	Spain	UCI Europe Tour	2005
Vuelta a Andalucía	Spain	UCI Europe Tour	2017–2019
Vuelta a Burgos	Spain	UCI Europe Tour	2005–2019
Presidential Cycling Tour of Turkey^{↑}	Turkey	UCI Europe Tour	2010–2016
Abu Dhabi Tour^{↑}	United Arab Emirates	UCI Asia Tour	2016
Dubai Tour	United Arab Emirates	UCI Asia Tour	2015–2018
Colorado Classic	United States	UCI America Tour	2017–2018
Tour of California^{↑}	United States	UCI America Tour	2007–2016
Tour de Georgia	United States	UCI America Tour	2006–2008
Tour of Missouri	United States	UCI America Tour	2009
Tour of Utah	United States	UCI America Tour	2015–2019
USA Pro Cycling Challenge	United States	UCI America Tour	2012–2015

Key
^{↑}	Race was promoted to the UCI World Tour.

== Winners by race ==
The following lists show the winners of .HC races since the introduction of the UCI Continental Circuits in 2005 until the disappearance of the class in 2020.

- A dark grey cell indicates the race was not held in that year.
- A light blue cell indicates the race was held in a lower category (2.1/1.1 or lower) in that year.
- A gold cell indicates the race was part of the UCI ProTour or UCI World Tour in that year.

=== 1.HC Winners ===
2005–2013

Year	2005	2006	2007	2008	2009	2010	2011	2012	2013
(Belgium) Omloop Het Nieuwsblad	(Belgium) Nuyens	(Belgium) Gilbert	(Italy) Pozzato	(Belgium) Gilbert	(Norway) Hushovd	(Spain) Flecha	(Netherlands) Langeveld	(Belgium) Vanmarcke	(Italy) Paolini
(Spain) Clásica de Almería								(Australia) Matthews	(Australia) Renshaw
(Italy) Milano–Torino	(Italy) Sacchi	(Spain) Astarloa	(Italy) Di Luca					(Spain) Contador	(Italy) Ulissi
(Belgium) Dwars door Vlaanderen									(Italy) Gatto
(Belgium) E3 Harelbeke	(Belgium) Boonen	(Belgium) Boonen	(Belgium) Boonen	(Norway) Arvesen	(Italy) Pozzato	(Switzerland) Cancellara	(Switzerland) Cancellara
(Spain) GP Miguel Induráin			(Italy) Nocentini	(Germany) Wegmann	(Spain) de la Fuente	(Spain) Rodríguez	(Spain) S Sánchez	(Spain) Moreno
(Germany) Rund um Köln			(Argentina) Haedo
(Belgium) Scheldeprijs	(Netherlands) Veneberg	(Belgium) Boonen	(United Kingdom) Cavendish	(United Kingdom) Cavendish	(Italy) Petacchi	(United States) Farrar	(United Kingdom) Cavendish	(Germany) Kittel	(Germany) Kittel
(Netherlands) Veenendaal–Veenendaal	(Netherlands) van Schalen	(Belgium) Boonen	(Germany) Radochla	(Germany) Förster	(Netherlands) van Hummel	(Norway) Boasson Hagen
(Belgium) Brabantse Pijl							(Belgium) Gilbert	(France) Voeckler	(Slovakia) Sagan
(Germany) Rund um den Henniger Turm	(Germany) Zabel	(Italy) Garzelli	(Germany) Sinkewitz	(Netherlands) Kroon	(Germany) Wegmann	(Germany) Wegmann	(Germany) Degenkolb	(Italy) Moser	(Slovenia) Špilak
(Switzerland) Grand Prix of Aargau Canton	(Switzerland) Moos	(Switzerland) Zberg	(France) Gadret	(France) Mondory	(Slovakia) Velits	(Belgium) Vandewalle
(United States) Philadelphia International Cycling Classic	(United States) Wherry	(New Zealand) Henderson	(Argentina) Haedo	(Denmark) Breschel	(Germany) Greipel	(Australia) Goss	(Denmark) Rasmussen	(Russia) Serebryakov
(Italy) Giro del Lazio	(Italy) Pozzato	(Italy) Figueras	(Italy) Bosisio	(Italy) Masciarelli
(Italy) Tre Valli Varesine	(Italy) Garzelli	(Italy) Garzelli	(Italy) Murro	(Italy) Ginanni	(Italy) Santambrogio	(Republic of Ireland) D Martin	(Italy) Rebellin	(Canada) Veilleux	(Croatia) Đurasek
(Italy) Giro del Veneto	(Italy) Mazzoleni	(Italy) Nocentini	(Italy) Bertolini	(Italy) Ginanni	(Italy) Pozzato
(Italy) Coppa Placci	(Italy) Valoti	(Italy) Nocentini	(Italy) Bertolini	(Italy) Paolini
(United States) San Francisco Grand Prix	(Germany) Wegmann
(Belgium) Paris-Brussels	(Australia) McEwen	(Australia) McEwen	(Australia) McEwen	(Australia) McEwen	(Australia) Goss	(Spain) Ventoso	(Russia) Galimzyanov	(Belgium) Boonen	(Germany) Greipel
(France) Grand Prix de Fourmies	(Australia) McEwen	(Belgium) Gilbert	(Slovakia) Velits	(Italy) Visconti	(France) Feillu	(France) Feillu	(France) Blot	(Denmark) Bak	(France) Bouhanni
(France) Tour de Vendée						(Spain) Fernández	(Italy) Marcato	(Netherlands) Kreder	(France) Bouhanni
(Italy) Giro dell'Emilia	(Italy) Simoni	(Italy) Rebellin	(Luxembourg) Schleck	(Italy) Di Luca	(Netherlands) Gesink	(Netherlands) Gesink	(Colombia) Betancur	(Colombia) Quintana	(Italy) Ulissi
(France) Paris–Tours				(Belgium) Gilbert	(Belgium) Gilbert	(Spain) Freire	(Belgium) Van Avermaet	(Italy) Marcato	(Germany) Degenkolb
(Italy) Giro del Piemonte	(Brazil) Fischer	(Italy) Bennati		(Italy) Bennati	(Belgium) Gilbert	(Belgium) Gilbert	(Spain) Moreno	(Colombia) Urán
Japan Cup				(Italy) Cunego	(Denmark) Sørensen	(Republic of Ireland) D Martin	(Australia) Haas	(Italy) Basso	(Australia) Rogers

2014–2019

Year	2014	2015	2016	2017	2018	2019
(Italy) Trofeo Laigueglia		(Italy) Cimolai	(Italy) Fedi	(Italy) Felline	(Italy) Moser	(Italy) Velasco
(Spain) Clásica de Almería					(Australia) Ewan	(Germany) Ackermann
(Belgium) Kuurne–Brussels–Kuurne			(Belgium) Stuyven	(Slovakia) Sagan	(Netherlands) Groenewegen	(Luxembourg) Jungels
(Italy) GP Industria & Artigianato di Larciano				(United Kingdom) Yates	(Slovenia) Mohorič	(Germany) Schachmann
(Netherlands) Ronde van Drenthe					(Czech Republic) Sisr	(Netherlands) Ligthart
(Belgium) Nokere Koerse			(Belgium) Dupont	(France) Bouhanni	(Netherlands) Jakobsen	(Netherlands) Bol
(Belgium) Bredene Koksijde Classic					(Colombia) Hodeg	(Germany) Ackermann
(France) Grand Prix de Denain			(United Kingdom) McLay	(France) Démare	(Belgium) Dehaes	(Netherlands) van der Poel
(Belgium) Scheldeprijs	(Germany) Kittel	(Norway) Kristoff	(Germany) Kittel	(Germany) Kittel	(Netherlands) Jakobsen	(Netherlands) Jakobsen
(Belgium) Brabantse Pijl	(Belgium) Gilbert	(Belgium) Hermans	(Czech Republic) Vakoč	(Italy) Colbrelli	(Belgium) Wellens	(Netherlands) van der Poel
(Switzerland) Grand Prix of Aargau Canton	(Germany) Geschke	(Norway) Kristoff	(Italy) Nizzolo	(Italy) Modolo	(Norway) Kristoff	(Norway) Kristoff
(Belgium) Brussels Cycling Classic	(Germany) Greipel	(Netherlands) Groenewegen	(Belgium) Boonen	(France) Démare	(Germany) Ackermann	(Australia) Ewan
(France) Grand Prix de Fourmies	(Belgium) Vangenechten	(Italy) Felline	(Germany) Kittel	(France) Bouhanni	(Germany) Ackermann	(Germany) Ackermann
(Belgium) Primus Classic		(Belgium) De Bie	(Colombia) Gaviria	(Italy) Trentin	(Netherlands) van der Hoorn	(Belgium) Theuns
(Germany) Münsterland Giro		(Belgium) Boonen	(Germany) Degenkolb	(Republic of Ireland) Bennett	(Germany) Walscheid	(Colombia) Hodeg
(Belgium) Tour de l'Eurométropole				(United Kingdom) McLay	(Denmark) Pedersen	(Belgium) Allegaert
(Italy) Giro dell'Emilia	(Italy) Rebellin	(Belgium) Bakelants	(Colombia) Chaves	(Italy) Visconti	(Italy) De Marchi	(Slovenia) Roglič
(Italy) Gran Premio Bruno Beghelli	(Italy) Conti	(Italy) Colbrelli	(Italy) Ruffoni	(Spain) LL Sánchez	(Netherlands) Mollema	(Italy) Colbrelli
(Italy) Tre Valli Varesine	(Switzerland) Albasini	(Italy) Nibali	(Italy) Colbrelli	(France) Geniez	(Latvia) Skujiņš	(Slovenia) Roglič
(Italy) Milano–Torino	(Italy) Caruso	(Italy) Rosa	(Colombia) López	(Colombia) Urán	(France) Pinot	(Canada) Woods
(Italy) Gran Piemonte		(Belgium) Bakelants	(Italy) Nizzolo		(Italy) Colbrelli	(Colombia) Bernal
(France) Paris–Tours	(Belgium) Wallays	(Italy) Trentin	(Colombia) Gaviria	(Italy) Trentin	(Denmark) Kragh Andersen	(Belgium) Wallays
Japan Cup	(Australia) Haas	(Netherlands) Mollema	(Italy) Villella	(Italy) Canola	(Australia) Power	(Netherlands) Mollema
(Switzerland) Gran Premio di Lugano		(Italy) Bonifazio	(Italy) Colbrelli	(Italy) Filosi
(Australia) Cadel Evans Great Ocean Road Race			(United Kingdom) Kennaugh
(Belgium) Omloop Het Nieuwsblad	(United Kingdom) Stannard	(United Kingdom) Stannard	(Belgium) Van Avermaet
(Italy) Strade Bianche		(Czech Republic) Štybar	(Switzerland) Cancellara
(Belgium) Dwars door Vlaanderen	(Netherlands) Terpstra	(Belgium) Wallays	(Belgium) Debusschere
(Germany) Eschborn–Frankfurt	(Norway) Kristoff		(Norway) Kristoff
(United Kingdom) London–Surrey Classic	(United Kingdom) Blythe	(Luxembourg) Drucker	(Belgium) Boonen
(Italy) Gran Premio Nobili Rubinetterie		(Italy) Nizzolo

=== 2.HC Winners ===
2005–2013

Year	2005	2006	2007	2008	2009	2010	2011	2012	2013
(Australia) Tour Down Under	(Spain) LL Sánchez	(Australia) Gerrans	(Switzerland) Elmiger
Tour of Qatar								(Belgium) Boonen	(United Kingdom) Cavendish
Tour of Oman								(Slovakia) Velits	(United Kingdom) Froome
(Malaysia) Tour de Langkawi	(South Africa) Cox	(South Africa) George	(France) Charteau	(Moldova) R Ivanov	(Colombia) Serpa	(Venezuela) Rujano	(Venezuela) Monsalve	(Colombia) Serpa	(Colombia) Arredondo
(United States) Tour of California			(United States) Leipheimer	(United States) Leipheimer	(United States) Leipheimer	(Australia) Rogers	(United States) Horner	(Netherlands) Gesink	(United States) Van Garderen
(Spain) Setmana Catalana de Ciclisme	(Spain) Contador
(France) Critérium International	(United States) Julich	(Italy) Basso	(Germany) Voigt	(Germany) Voigt	(Germany) Voigt	(France) Fédrigo	(Luxembourg) Schleck	(Australia) Evans	(United Kingdom) Froome
(Belgium) Three Days of De Panne	(Belgium) Devolder	(Belgium) Hoste	(Italy) Ballan	(Netherlands) Posthuma	(Belgium) Willems	(United Kingdom) Millar	(Belgium) Rosseler	(France) Chavanel	(France) Chavanel
(Italy) Giro del Trentino							(Italy) Scarponi	(Italy) Pozzovivo	(Italy) Nibali
Presidential Cycling Tour of Turkey						(Italy) Visconti	(Russia) Efimkin	(Kazakhstan) Dyachenko	(Eritrea) Berhane
(United States) Tour de Georgia		(United States) Landis	(Slovenia) Brajkovič	(Belarus) Siutsou
(France) Four Days of Dunkirk	(France) Fédrigo	(Italy) Petito	(France) Ladagnous	(France) Augé	(Portugal) Costa	(Switzerland) Elmiger	(France) Voeckler	(France) Engoulvent	(France) Démare
(Czech Republic) Peace Race		(Italy) Cheula
Tour of Belgium					(Netherlands) Boom	(Belgium) Devolder	(Belgium) Gilbert	(Germany) T Martin	(Germany) T Martin
(Germany) Bayern Rundfahrt	(Germany) Rich	(Spain) Martínez	(Germany) Schumacher	(Germany) Knees	(Germany) Gerdemann	(Belgium) Monfort	(United Kingdom) Thomas	(Australia) Rogers	(Italy) Malori
(Spain) Euskal Bizikleta	(Spain) Jiménez	(Spain) Gil	(Spain) Zaballa	(Italy) Capecchi
Tour de Luxembourg	(Hungary) Bodrogi	(United States) Vande Velde	(Switzerland) Rast	(Netherlands) Posthuma	(Luxembourg) Schleck	(Italy) Carrara	(Germany) Gerdemann	(Denmark) Fuglsang	(Germany) Martens
Tour of Austria		(United States) Danielson	(Belgium) Devolder	(Austria) Rohregger	(Switzerland) Albasini	(Italy) Riccò	(Sweden) Kessiakoff	(Denmark) Fuglsang	(Austria) Zoidl
(China) Tour of Qinghai Lake	(Czech Republic) Mareš	(Netherlands) Tjallingii	(Italy) Missaglia	(United States) Hamilton	(Kazakhstan) Mizurov	(Iran) Askari	(Slovenia) Gazvoda	(Iran) Alizadeh	(Iran) Pourseyedi
(Belgium) Tour de Wallonie	(Italy) Celli	(Italy) Guidi	(Slovenia) Božič	(Russia) S Ivanov	(France) El Fares	(United Kingdom) Downing	(Belgium) Van Avermaet	(Italy) Nizzolo	(Belgium) Van Avermaet
(Denmark) Danmark Rundt	(Italy) Basso	(Switzerland) Cancellara	(Norway) Arvesen	(Denmark) Fuglsang	(Denmark) Fuglsang	(Denmark) Fuglsang	(Australia) Gerrans	(Netherlands) Westra	(Netherlands) Kelderman
Volta a Portugal	(Russia) Efimkin	(Spain) Blanco	(Spain) Tondo	(Spain) Blanco	(Spain) Blanco
(Spain) Vuelta a Burgos	(Spain) Domínguez	(Spain) Mayo	(Colombia) Soler	(Spain) Zandio	(Spain) Valverde	(Spain) S Sánchez	(Spain) Rodríguez	(Spain) Moreno	(Colombia) Quintana
(France) Tour du Limousin							(Belgium) Leukemans	(Japan) Arashiro
(United States) USA Pro Cycling Challenge								(United States) Vande Velde	(United States) Van Garderen
(United States) Tour of Missouri					(United States) Zabriskie
(China) Tour of Hainan					(Spain) Ventoso	(Kazakhstan) Iglinsky	(Kazakhstan) Iglinsky	(Kazakhstan) Gruzdev	(Netherlands) Hofland

2014–2019

Year	2014	2015	2016	2017	2018	2019
Tour of Oman	(United Kingdom) Froome	(Spain) Valls	(Italy) Nibali	(Belgium) Hermans	(Kazakhstan) Lutsenko	(Kazakhstan) Lutsenko
(Portugal) Volta ao Algarve				(Slovenia) Roglič	(Poland) Kwiatkowski	(Slovenia) Pogačar
(Spain) Vuelta a Andalucía				(Spain) Valverde	(Belgium) Wellens	(Denmark) Fuglsang
(Malaysia) Tour de Langkawi	(Iran) Pourseyedi	(Algeria) Reguigui	(South Africa) Janse van Rensburg	(South Africa) Gibbons	(Russia) Ovechkin	(Australia) Dyball
(Italy) Tour of the Alps	(Australia) Evans	(Australia) Porte	(Spain) Landa	(United Kingdom) Thomas	(France) Pinot	(Russia) Sivakov
(United Kingdom) Tour de Yorkshire						(United Kingdom) Lawless
(France) Four Days of Dunkirk	(France) Démare	(Lithuania) Konovalovas	(France) Coquard	(France) Venturini	(Belgium) Claeys	(Netherlands) Teunissen
Tour of Norway	(Poland) Paterski	(Denmark) Hansen	(Netherlands) Weening	(Norway) Boasson Hagen	(Spain) Prades	(Norway) Kristoff
Tour de Luxembourg	(Denmark) Breschel	(Germany) Gerdemann	(Netherlands) Lammertink	(Belgium) Van Avermaet	(Italy) Pasqualon	(Spain) Herrada
Tour of Belgium	(Germany) T Martin	(Belgium) Van Avermaet	(Belgium) Devenyns	(Belgium) Keukeleire	(Belgium) Keukeleire	(Belgium) Evenepoel
Tour of Slovenia						(Italy) Ulissi
(China) Tour of Qinghai Lake	(Ukraine) Kononenko	(Croatia) Rogina	(Ukraine) Lagkuti	(Venezuela) Monsalve	(Colombia) Aguirre	(Colombia) Chalapud
(Belgium) Tour de Wallonie	(Belgium) Meersman	(Netherlands) Terpstra	(Belgium) Devenyns	(Belgium) Teuns	(Belgium) Wellens	(Belgium) Vliegen
(Spain) Vuelta a Burgos	(Colombia) Quintana	(Estonia) Taaramäe	(Spain) Contador	(Spain) Landa	(Colombia) Sosa	(Colombia) Sosa
(United States) Tour of Utah		(United States) Dombrowski	(Australia) Morton	(Canada) Britton	(United States) Kuss	(Belgium) Hermans
Arctic Race of Norway		(Estonia) Taaramäe	(Italy) Moscon	(Belgium) Teuns	(Russia) Chernetskiy	(Kazakhstan) Lutsenko
(Denmark) Danmark Rundt	(Denmark) Valgren	(Denmark) Juul-Jensen	(Denmark) Valgren	(Denmark) Pedersen	(Belgium) van Aert	(Denmark) Larsen
(Germany) Deutschland Tour						(Belgium) Stuyven
(United Kingdom) Tour of Britain	(Netherlands) van Baarle	(Norway) Boasson Hagen	(United Kingdom) Cummings	(Netherlands) Boom	(France) Alaphilippe	(Netherlands) van der Poel
(Belgium) Three Days of De Panne	(Belgium) Van Keirsbulck	(Norway) Kristoff	(Netherlands) Westra	(Belgium) Gilbert	(Italy) Viviani
Tour of Croatia					(Belarus) Siutsou
(United Arab Emirates) Dubai Tour		(United Kingdom) Cavendish	(Germany) Kittel	(Germany) Kittel	(Italy) Viviani
(Norway) Tour des Fjords					(Switzerland) Albasini
(United States) Colorado Classic				(Italy) Senni	(United States) Mannion
(China) Tour of Hainan	(France) Antomarchi	(Italy) Modolo	(Kazakhstan) Lutsenko	(Italy) Mosca	(Italy) Masnada
(United Arab Emirates) Abu Dhabi Tour			(Estonia) Kangert
(United States) Tour of California	(United Kingdom) Wiggins	(Slovakia) Sagan	(France) Alaphilippe
Presidential Cycling Tour of Turkey	(United Kingdom) Yates	(Croatia) Đurasek	(Portugal) Gonçalves
Tour of Qatar	(Netherlands) Terpstra	(Netherlands) Terpstra	(United Kingdom) Cavendish
(France) Critérium International	(France) Péraud	(France) Péraud	(France) Pinot
Tour of Austria	(United Kingdom) Kennaugh	(Spain) de la Parte
(Germany) Bayern Rundfahrt	(United Kingdom) Thomas	(United Kingdom) Dowsett
(United States) USA Pro Cycling Challenge	(United States) Van Garderen	(Australia) Dennis

=== Most race wins ===
Rank	Cyclist	1.HC	2.HC	Total
1.	(Belgium) Philippe Gilbert	9	2	11
2.	(Belgium) Tom Boonen	9	1	10
3.	(Germany) Marcel Kittel	6	2	8
3.	(Norway) Alexander Kristoff	6	2	8
5.	(United Kingdom) Mark Cavendish	3	3	6
5.	(Italy) Sonny Colbrelli	6	0	6
5.	(Denmark) Jakob Fuglsang	0	6	6
5.	(Belgium) Greg Van Avermaet	2	4	6
9.	(Germany) Pascal Ackermann	5	0	5
9.	(Australia) Robbie McEwen	5	0	5
