= 2019 UAE Tour =

Cycling race

2019 UCI World Tour, race 3 of 38

Race details
- Dates: 24 February–2 March 2019
- Stages: 7
- Distance: 1,077 km (669.2 mi)
- Winning time: 26h 27' 29"

Results
Jersey awarded to the overall winner	Winner	Primož Roglič (SLO)	(Team Jumbo–Visma)
	Second	Alejandro Valverde (ESP)	(Movistar Team)
	Third	David Gaudu (FRA)	(Groupama–FDJ)
Jersey awarded to the youth classification winner	Youth	David Gaudu (FRA)	(Groupama–FDJ)
Jersey awarded to the sprints classification winner	Sprints	Elia Viviani (ITA)	(Deceuninck–Quick-Step)
	Team	Bora–Hansgrohe	

The 2019 UAE Tour was a road cycling stage race, that took place between 24 February and 2 March 2019 in the United Arab Emirates. It was the first edition of the UAE Tour, replacing the Abu Dhabi Tour and Dubai Tour races. It was the third race of the 2019 UCI World Tour.

The race was won by Slovenian rider Primož Roglič of Team Jumbo–Visma.

== Teams ==
Twenty teams started the race. Each team had a maximum of seven riders:

UCI WorldTeams

- Bora–Hansgrohe
- CCC Team
- Groupama–FDJ
- Mitchelton–Scott
- Team Katusha–Alpecin
- UAE Team Emirates
- AG2R La Mondiale
- Deceuninck–Quick-Step
- Lotto–Soudal
- Team Dimension Data
- Team Sunweb
- Bahrain–Merida
- Astana
- EF Education First
- Movistar Team
- Team Jumbo–Visma
- Trek–Segafredo
- Team Sky

UCI Professional Continental teams

- Gazprom–RusVelo
- Team Novo Nordisk

== Route ==
Stage characteristics and winners
Stage	Date	Course	Distance	Type	Stage winner
1	24 February	Al Hudayriat Island to Al Hudayriat Island	16 km (9.9 mi)	Team time trial	Team Jumbo–Visma
2	25 February	Yas Island to Abu Dhabi	184 km (114 mi)	Flat stage	Fernando Gaviria (COL)
3	26 February	Al Ain to Jebel Hafeet	179 km (111 mi)	Medium mountain stage	Alejandro Valverde (ESP)
4	27 February	Palm Jumeirah to Hatta Dam	197 km (122 mi)	Hilly stage	Caleb Ewan (AUS)
5	28 February	Sharjah to Khor Fakkan	181 km (112 mi)	Flat stage	Elia Viviani (ITA)
6	1 March	Ajman to Jebel Jais	175 km (109 mi)	Mountain stage	Primož Roglič (SLO)
7	2 March	Dubai Safari Park to Dubai	145 km (90 mi)	Flat stage	Sam Bennett (IRL)

== Stages ==
=== Stage 1 ===
Stage 1 result

Rank	Team	Time
1	Team Jumbo–Visma	16' 49"
2	Team Sunweb	+ 7"
3	Bahrain–Merida	+ 9"
4	Team Sky	+ 14"
5	Movistar Team	+ 18"
6	CCC Team	+ 24"
7	Deceuninck–Quick-Step	+ 26"
8	EF Education First	s.t.
9	Bora–Hansgrohe	+ 29"
10	Team Dimension Data	s.t.

General classification after Stage 1

Rank	Rider	Team	Time
1	Primož Roglič (SLO)	Team Jumbo–Visma	16' 49"
2	Laurens De Plus (BEL)	Team Jumbo–Visma	s.t.
3	Jos van Emden (NED)	Team Jumbo–Visma	s.t.
4	Koen Bouwman (NED)	Team Jumbo–Visma	s.t.
5	Max Walscheid (GER)	Team Sunweb	+ 7"
6	Chad Haga (USA)	Team Sunweb	s.t.
7	Tom Dumoulin (NED)	Team Sunweb	s.t.
8	Wilco Kelderman (NED)	Team Sunweb	s.t.
9	Nikias Arndt (GER)	Team Sunweb	s.t.
10	Rohan Dennis (AUS)	Bahrain–Merida	+ 8"

=== Stage 2 ===
Stage 2 result

Rank	Rider	Team	Time
1	Fernando Gaviria (COL)	UAE Team Emirates	4h 36' 32"
2	Elia Viviani (ITA)	Deceuninck–Quick-Step	s.t.
3	Caleb Ewan (AUS)	Lotto–Soudal	s.t.
4	Kristoffer Halvorsen (NOR)	Team Sky	s.t.
5	Erik Baška (SVK)	Bora–Hansgrohe	s.t.
6	Sam Bennett (IRL)	Bora–Hansgrohe	s.t.
7	Sacha Modolo (ITA)	EF Education First	s.t.
8	Marcel Kittel (GER)	Team Katusha–Alpecin	s.t.
9	Marc Sarreau (FRA)	Groupama–FDJ	s.t.
10	Jakub Mareczko (ITA)	CCC Team	s.t.

General classification after Stage 2

Rank	Rider	Team	Time
1	Primož Roglič (SLO)	Team Jumbo–Visma	4h 53' 21"
2	Jos van Emden (NED)	Team Jumbo–Visma	s.t.
3	Laurens De Plus (BEL)	Team Jumbo–Visma	s.t.
4	Koen Bouwman (NED)	Team Jumbo–Visma	s.t.
5	Wilco Kelderman (NED)	Team Sunweb	+ 6"
6	Max Walscheid (GER)	Team Sunweb	+ 7"
7	Tom Dumoulin (NED)	Team Sunweb	s.t.
8	Nikias Arndt (GER)	Team Sunweb	s.t.
9	Vincenzo Nibali (ITA)	Bahrain–Merida	+ 9"
10	Damiano Caruso (ITA)	Bahrain–Merida	s.t.

=== Stage 3 ===
Stage 3 result

Rank	Rider	Team	Time
1	Alejandro Valverde (ESP)	Movistar Team	4h 44' 50"
2	Primož Roglič (SLO)	Team Jumbo–Visma	s.t.
3	David Gaudu (FRA)	Groupama–FDJ	s.t.
4	Emanuel Buchmann (GER)	Bora–Hansgrohe	+ 4"
5	Dan Martin (IRL)	UAE Team Emirates	+ 12"
6	Davide Formolo (ITA)	Bora–Hansgrohe	+ 33"
7	Ilnur Zakarin (RUS)	Team Katusha–Alpecin	s.t.
8	James Knox (GBR)	Deceuninck–Quick-Step	+ 35"
9	Bauke Mollema (NED)	Trek–Segafredo	s.t.
10	Jan Hirt (CZE)	Astana	s.t.

General classification after Stage 3

Rank	Rider	Team	Time
1	Primož Roglič (SLO)	Team Jumbo–Visma	9h 38' 05"
2	Alejandro Valverde (ESP)	Movistar Team	+ 14"
3	David Gaudu (FRA)	Groupama–FDJ	+ 31"
4	Emanuel Buchmann (GER)	Bora–Hansgrohe	+ 39"
5	Wilco Kelderman (NED)	Team Sunweb	+ 47"
6	Dan Martin (IRL)	UAE Team Emirates	+ 54"
7	Tom Dumoulin (NED)	Team Sunweb	+ 57"
8	Víctor de la Parte (ESP)	CCC Team	+ 1' 05"
9	James Knox (GBR)	Deceuninck–Quick-Step	+ 1' 07"
10	Davide Formolo (ITA)	Bora–Hansgrohe	+ 1' 08"

=== Stage 4 ===
Stage 4 result

Rank	Rider	Team	Time
1	Caleb Ewan (AUS)	Lotto–Soudal	4h 27' 07"
2	Matteo Moschetti (ITA)	Trek–Segafredo	+ 2"
3	Primož Roglič (SLO)	Team Jumbo–Visma	s.t.
4	Quentin Jaurégui (FRA)	AG2R La Mondiale	+ 5"
5	Luka Mezgec (SLO)	Mitchelton–Scott	s.t.
6	Wilco Kelderman (NED)	Team Sunweb	s.t.
7	Diego Ulissi (ITA)	UAE Team Emirates	s.t.
8	Alejandro Valverde (ESP)	Movistar Team	s.t.
9	Marco Haller (AUT)	Team Katusha–Alpecin	s.t.
10	Bauke Mollema (NED)	Trek–Segafredo	s.t.

General classification after Stage 4

Rank	Rider	Team	Time
1	Primož Roglič (SLO)	Team Jumbo–Visma	14h 05' 10"
2	Alejandro Valverde (ESP)	Movistar Team	+ 21"
3	David Gaudu (FRA)	Groupama–FDJ	+ 38"
4	Emanuel Buchmann (GER)	Bora–Hansgrohe	+ 46"
5	Wilco Kelderman (NED)	Team Sunweb	+ 54"
6	Dan Martin (IRL)	UAE Team Emirates	+ 1' 01"
7	Tom Dumoulin (NED)	Team Sunweb	+ 1' 04"
8	Víctor de la Parte (ESP)	CCC Team	+ 1' 12"
9	James Knox (GBR)	Deceuninck–Quick-Step	+ 1' 14"
10	Davide Formolo (ITA)	Bora–Hansgrohe	+ 1' 15"

=== Stage 5 ===
Stage 5 result

Rank	Rider	Team	Time
1	Elia Viviani (ITA)	Deceuninck–Quick-Step	4h 48' 59"
2	Fernando Gaviria (COL)	UAE Team Emirates	s.t.
3	Marcel Kittel (GER)	Team Katusha–Alpecin	s.t.
4	Sam Bennett (IRL)	Bora–Hansgrohe	s.t.
5	Reinardt Janse van Rensburg (RSA)	Team Dimension Data	s.t.
6	Phil Bauhaus (GER)	Bahrain–Merida	s.t.
7	Kristoffer Halvorsen (NOR)	Team Sky	s.t.
8	Jakub Mareczko (ITA)	CCC Team	s.t.
9	Cees Bol (NED)	Team Sunweb	s.t.
10	Max Walscheid (GER)	Team Sunweb	s.t.

General classification after Stage 5

Rank	Rider	Team	Time
1	Primož Roglič (SLO)	Team Jumbo–Visma	18h 54' 09"
2	Alejandro Valverde (ESP)	Movistar Team	+ 21"
3	David Gaudu (FRA)	Groupama–FDJ	+ 38"
4	Emanuel Buchmann (GER)	Bora–Hansgrohe	+ 46"
5	Wilco Kelderman (NED)	Team Sunweb	+ 54"
6	Dan Martin (IRL)	UAE Team Emirates	+ 1' 01"
7	Tom Dumoulin (NED)	Team Sunweb	+ 1' 04"
8	Víctor de la Parte (ESP)	CCC Team	+ 1' 12"
9	James Knox (GBR)	Deceuninck–Quick-Step	+ 1' 14"
10	Davide Formolo (ITA)	Bora–Hansgrohe	+ 1' 15"

=== Stage 6 ===
Stage 6 result

Rank	Rider	Team	Time
1	Primož Roglič (SLO)	Team Jumbo–Visma	4h 15' 39"
2	Tom Dumoulin (NED)	Team Sunweb	s.t.
3	David Gaudu (FRA)	Groupama–FDJ	s.t.
4	Dan Martin (IRL)	UAE Team Emirates	s.t.
5	Alejandro Valverde (ESP)	Movistar Team	s.t.
6	Wilco Kelderman (NED)	Team Sunweb	s.t.
7	Maximilian Schachmann (GER)	Bora–Hansgrohe	s.t.
8	Emanuel Buchmann (GER)	Bora–Hansgrohe	s.t.
9	Rui Costa (POR)	UAE Team Emirates	s.t.
10	James Knox (GBR)	Deceuninck–Quick-Step	+ 5"

General classification after Stage 6

Rank	Rider	Team	Time
1	Primož Roglič (SLO)	Team Jumbo–Visma	23h 09' 38"
2	Alejandro Valverde (ESP)	Movistar Team	+ 31"
3	David Gaudu (FRA)	Groupama–FDJ	+ 44"
4	Emanuel Buchmann (GER)	Bora–Hansgrohe	+ 56"
5	Wilco Kelderman (NED)	Team Sunweb	+ 1' 04"
6	Tom Dumoulin (NED)	Team Sunweb	+ 1' 08"
7	Dan Martin (IRL)	UAE Team Emirates	+ 1' 11"
8	James Knox (GBR)	Deceuninck–Quick-Step	+ 1' 29"
9	Laurens De Plus (BEL)	Team Jumbo–Visma	+ 1' 45"
10	Michał Kwiatkowski (POL)	Team Sky	+ 1' 49"

=== Stage 7 ===
Stage 7 result

Rank	Rider	Team	Time
1	Sam Bennett (IRL)	Bora–Hansgrohe	3h 17' 51"
2	Fernando Gaviria (COL)	UAE Team Emirates	s.t.
3	Caleb Ewan (AUS)	Lotto–Soudal	s.t.
4	Alexander Kristoff (NOR)	UAE Team Emirates	s.t.
5	Elia Viviani (ITA)	Deceuninck–Quick-Step	s.t.
6	Phil Bauhaus (GER)	Bahrain–Merida	s.t.
7	Max Walscheid (GER)	Team Sunweb	s.t.
8	Luka Mezgec (SLO)	Mitchelton–Scott	s.t.
9	Matteo Moschetti (ITA)	Trek–Segafredo	s.t.
10	Kristoffer Halvorsen (NOR)	Team Sky	s.t.

== Classification leadership table ==
Stage	Winner	General classification	Points classification	Youth classification	Team classification
1	Team Jumbo–Visma	Primož Roglič	Not awarded	Laurens De Plus	Team Jumbo–Visma
2	Fernando Gaviria	Primož Roglič	Fernando Gaviria	Laurens De Plus	Team Jumbo–Visma
3	Alejandro Valverde	Primož Roglič	Stepan Kurianov	David Gaudu	Bora–Hansgrohe
4	Caleb Ewan	Primož Roglič	Stepan Kurianov	David Gaudu	Bora–Hansgrohe
5	Elia Viviani	Primož Roglič	Stepan Kurianov	David Gaudu	Bora–Hansgrohe
6	Primož Roglič	Primož Roglič	Stepan Kurianov	David Gaudu	Bora–Hansgrohe
7	Sam Bennett	Primož Roglič	Elia Viviani	David Gaudu	Bora–Hansgrohe
Final		Primož Roglič	Elia Viviani	David Gaudu	Bora–Hansgrohe

== Classifications ==
Legend
Denotes the winner of the general classification
Denotes the winner of the points classification
Denotes the winner of the young rider classification

Final general classification

Rank	Rider	Team	Time
1	Primož Roglič (SLO)	Team Jumbo–Visma	26h 27' 29"
2	Alejandro Valverde (ESP)	Movistar Team	+ 31"
3	David Gaudu (FRA)	Groupama–FDJ	+ 44"
4	Emanuel Buchmann (GER)	Bora–Hansgrohe	+ 56"
5	Wilco Kelderman (NED)	Team Sunweb	+ 1' 04"
6	Tom Dumoulin (NED)	Team Sunweb	+ 1' 08"
7	Dan Martin (IRL)	UAE Team Emirates	+ 1' 11"
8	James Knox (GBR)	Deceuninck–Quick-Step	+ 1' 29"
9	Laurens De Plus (BEL)	Team Jumbo–Visma	+ 1' 45"
10	Michał Kwiatkowski (POL)	Team Sky	+ 1' 49"

Final points classification

Rank	Rider	Team	Points
1	Elia Viviani (ITA)	Deceuninck–Quick-Step	57
2	Fernando Gaviria (COL)	UAE Team Emirates	52
3	Stepan Kurianov (RUS)	Gazprom–RusVelo	52
4	Primož Roglič (SLO)	Team Jumbo–Visma	48
5	Caleb Ewan (AUS)	Lotto–Soudal	44
6	Charles Planet (FRA)	Team Novo Nordisk	43
7	Sam Bennett (IRL)	Bora–Hansgrohe	34
8	Alejandro Valverde (ESP)	Movistar Team	30
9	David Gaudu (FRA)	Groupama–FDJ	24
10	Matteo Moschetti (ITA)	Trek–Segafredo	18

Final young rider classification

Rank	Rider	Team	Time
1	David Gaudu (FRA)	Groupama–FDJ	26h 28' 13"
2	James Knox (GBR)	Deceuninck–Quick-Step	+ 45"
3	Laurens De Plus (BEL)	Team Jumbo–Visma	+ 1' 01"
4	Maximilian Schachmann (GER)	Bora–Hansgrohe	+ 1' 12"
5	Pavel Sivakov (RUS)	Team Sky	+ 3' 54"
6	Bjorg Lambrecht (BEL)	Lotto–Soudal	+ 4' 02"
7	Aurélien Paret-Peintre (FRA)	AG2R La Mondiale	+ 4' 28"
8	Niklas Eg (DEN)	Trek–Segafredo	+ 4' 42"
9	Quentin Jaurégui (FRA)	AG2R La Mondiale	+ 5' 12"
10	Artem Nych (RUS)	Gazprom–RusVelo	+ 5' 41"

Final teams classification

Rank	Team	Time
1	Bora–Hansgrohe	78h 52' 35"
2	UAE Team Emirates	+ 35"
3	Astana	+ 5' 46"
4	AG2R La Mondiale	+ 5' 49"
5	CCC Team	+ 8' 19"
6	Team Sky	+ 8' 20"
7	Mitchelton–Scott	+ 9' 52"
8	Team Sunweb	+ 11' 14"
9	Trek–Segafredo	+ 16' 41"
10	Team Jumbo–Visma	+ 18' 53"
