= 2015 Abu Dhabi Tour =

2015 UCI Asia Tour, race 20 of 34

Race details
- Dates: October 8, 2015–October 11, 2015
- Stages: 4
- Distance: 555 km (344.9 mi)

Results
Jersey awarded to the overall winner	Winner	Esteban Chaves (COL)	(Orica–GreenEDGE)
	Second	Fabio Aru (ITA)	(Astana)
	Third	Wouter Poels (NED)	(Team Sky)
Jersey awarded to the points classification winner	Points	Elia Viviani (ITA)	(Team Sky)
Jersey awarded to the youth classification winner	Youth	Esteban Chaves (COL)	(Orica–GreenEDGE)

The 2015 Abu Dhabi Tour was a men's cycling stage race, that took place between 8-11 October 2015. It was the inaugural edition of the Abu Dhabi Tour and was part of the 2015 UCI Asia Tour.

The event featured prominent riders, including newly crowned World Champion Peter Sagan in his first race appearance after the Championship race. The Astana team were captained by Vincenzo Nibali, who won the Giro di Lombardia a couple of days prior. He was assisted by Fabio Aru, winner of the Vuelta a España.

== Teams ==
Eighteen teams entered the race. Each team had a maximum of six riders.

UCI WorldTeams

- Astana
- BMC Racing Team
- Etixx–Quick-Step
- Lampre–Merida
- Movistar Team
- Orica–GreenEDGE
- Team Giant–Alpecin
- Team Katusha
- Team Sky
- Tinkoff–Saxo

UCI Professional Continental teams

- Bora–Argon 18
- Colombia
- Drapac Professional Cycling
- MTN–Qhubeka
- UnitedHealthcare

UCI Continental teams

- Skydive Dubai–Al Ahli
- WIGGINS
- United Arab Emirates National Cycling Team

== Route and stages ==
Stage characteristics and winners
Stage	Date	Route	Distance	Type	Winner
1	8 October	Qasr Al Sarab to Madinat Zayed	175 km (108.7 mi)	Flat stage	Andrea Guardini (ITA)
2	9 October	Abu Dhabi to Abu Dhabi	130 km (80.8 mi)	Flat stage	Elia Viviani (ITA)
3	10 October	Al Ain to Jebel Hafeet	140 km (87.0 mi)	Intermediate stage	Esteban Chaves (COL)
4	11 October	Yas Marina Circuit	110 km (68.4 mi)	Flat stage	Elia Viviani (ITA)
	Total		555 km (344.9 mi)		
