= Stepan Kurianov =

Russian bicycle racer

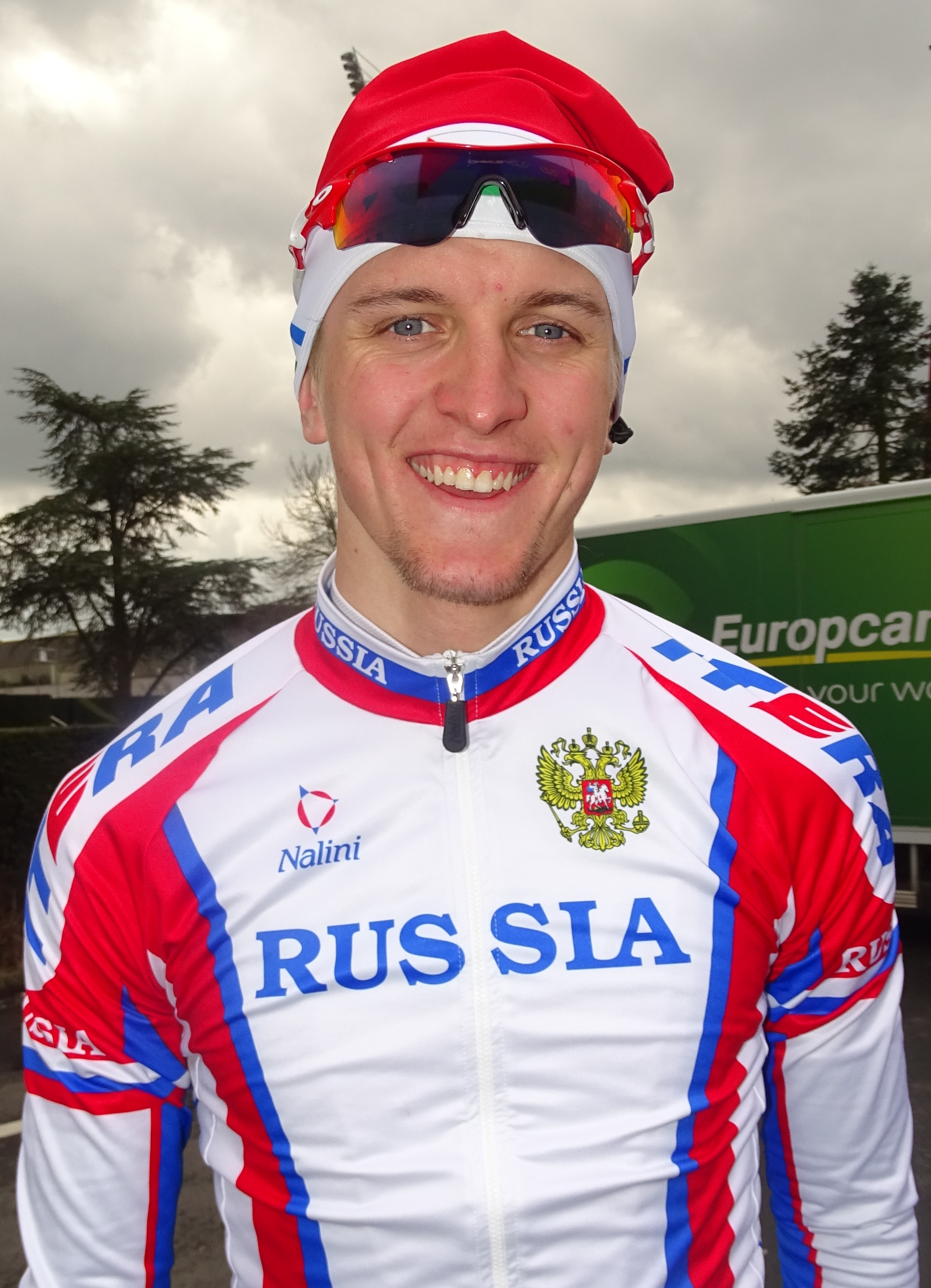
- Kurianov in 2015.

Personal information
- Full name: Stepan Mikhaylovich Kurianov
- Born: 7 December 1996 (age 29) Kovrov, Russia
- Height: 1.83 m (6 ft 0 in)
- Weight: 74 kg (163 lb)

Cycling career
- Sport: Cycling
- Current team: Tyumen Region
- Discipline: Road
- Role: Rider

Amateur teams
- 2015–2016: Tyumen Region
- 2017: Gazprom–Rusvelo U23
- 2022–: Tyumen Region

Professional teams
- 2017: Gazprom–RusVelo (stagiaire)
- 2018–2020: Gazprom–RusVelo
- 2021: Global 6 Cycling

Stepan Mikhaylovich Kurianov (Russian: Степан Михайлович Курьянов; born 7 December 1996) is a Russian cyclist, who currently rides for Russian amateur team Tyumen Region.

== Major results ==
2013
1st Stage 2 (TTT) Aubel–Thimister–La Gleize
3rd Overall Tour du Valromey

1st Young rider classification

6th Road race, UEC European Junior Road Championships
7th Overall Trofeo Karlsberg

1st Young rider classification

9th Trofeo Buffoni
2014
Aubel–Thimister–La Gleize

1st Points classification
1st Stages 1 & 2b

2nd Road race, National Junior Road Championships
2nd Overall Ronde des Vallées
4th Trofeo Buffoni
10th Overall Trofeo Karlsberg
2016
2nd Overall Samara Stage Race

1st Stage 1

3rd Overall Friendship People North-Caucasus Stage Race

1st Stages 2 & 3

3rd Trofeo Gianfranco Bianchin
9th Overall Carpathian Couriers Race
2017
1st Overall Samara Stage Race

1st Stages 2 & 4

3rd Time trial, National Under-23 Road Championships
5th Grand Prix Minsk
7th ZLM Tour
9th Minsk Cup
10th Overall Five Rings of Moscow
2021
7th Overall Five Rings of Moscow
