= UAE Tour =

Road cycling stage race in the United Arab Emirates

Race details
- Date: February
- Region: United Arab Emirates
- Discipline: Road
- Competition: UCI World Tour
- Type: Stage race
- Organiser: RCS Sport
- Web site: theuaetour.com

History (men)
- First edition: 2019
- Editions: 8 (as of 2026)
- First winner: Primož Roglič (SLO)
- Most wins: Tadej Pogačar (SLO) (3 wins)
- Most recent: Isaac del Toro (MEX)

History (women)
- First edition: 2023
- Editions: 4 (as of 2026)
- First winner: Elisa Longo Borghini (ITA)
- Most wins: Elisa Longo Borghini (ITA) (3 wins)
- Most recent: Elisa Longo Borghini (ITA)

The UAE Tour (Arabic: جولة الإمارات) are road cycling stage races in the United Arab Emirates, created as a result of the merging of the Abu Dhabi Tour and the Dubai Tour. A men's event was first held in 2019 as part of the UCI World Tour. A women's event was first held in 2023 as part of the UCI Women's World Tour. Both races have been won three times – the men's race by Slovenian rider Tadej Pogačar, and the women's race by Italian rider Elisa Longo Borghini. The race is owned by the Abu Dhabi Sports Council and organised by RCS Sport, the organisers of the Giro d'Italia and Giro d'Italia Women.

== History ==
The Dubai Tour was first held in 2014, with the Abu Dhabi Tour first held in 2015. The Abu Dhabi Tour joined the UCI World Tour calendar in 2017. In September 2018, the organisers of both races announced their intent to merge, resulting in the UAE Tour, a longer race that would use stages from both events.

The first edition of the race took place between 24 February and 2 March 2019 as part of the 2019 UCI World Tour. The 2020 UAE Tour was affected by the COVID-19 pandemic, with the last two stages cancelled and teams quarantined before being able to leave the country.

=== Women's race ===
In January 2023, organisers announced that a women's race would be held for the first time, as part of the UCI Women's World Tour. This was first staged over 4 days in early February 2023, prior to the men's race. Owing to crosswinds, stage 2 of the 2025 edition had an average speed of 48.407 kilometres per hour (30.079 mph), making it the fastest ever UCI Women's World Tour stage.

== Route ==
Both races use similar stages to that of the Abu Dhabi Tour and Dubai Tour – a combination of flat sprint stages and mountain stages using climbs such as Jebel Jais and Jebel Hafeet. Stages in the open desert can be affected by crosswinds. In the men's race, a time trial is also usually part of the route, with the 2019 and 2023 editions featuring a team time trial.

The Jebel Jais climb is usually considered the queen stage of the race, with 20 kilometres (12 mi) of climbing at 5%, with some 7% in the last 2 kilometres (1.2 mi).

== Winners ==
=== Elite Men ===
Years	General classification	Points classification	Sprints classification	Young rider classification
2019	(Slovenia) Primož Roglič (Team Jumbo–Visma)	(Italy) Elia Viviani (Deceuninck–Quick-Step)	not awarded	(France) David Gaudu (Groupama–FDJ)
2020	(United Kingdom) Adam Yates (Mitchelton–Scott)	(Australia) Caleb Ewan (Lotto–Soudal)	(Serbia) Veljko Stojnić (Vini Zabù–KTM)	(Slovenia) Tadej Pogačar (UAE Team Emirates)
2021	(Slovenia) Tadej Pogačar (UAE Team Emirates)	(Netherlands) David Dekker (Team Jumbo–Visma)	(France) Tony Gallopin (AG2R Citroën Team)	(Slovenia) Tadej Pogačar (UAE Team Emirates)
2022	(Slovenia) Tadej Pogačar (UAE Team Emirates)	(Belgium) Jasper Philipsen (Alpecin–Fenix)	(Russia) Dmitry Strakhov (Gazprom–RusVelo)	(Slovenia) Tadej Pogačar (UAE Team Emirates)
2023	(Belgium) Remco Evenepoel (Soudal–Quick-Step)	(Belgium) Tim Merlier (Soudal–Quick-Step)	(Belgium) Edward Planckaert (Alpecin–Deceuninck)	(Belgium) Remco Evenepoel (Soudal–Quick-Step)
2024	(Belgium) Lennert Van Eetvelt (Lotto–Dstny)	(Belgium) Tim Merlier (Soudal–Quick-Step)	(United Kingdom) Mark Stewart (Team Corratec–Vini Fantini)	(Belgium) Lennert Van Eetvelt (Lotto–Dstny)
2025	(Slovenia) Tadej Pogačar (UAE Team Emirates XRG)	(Italy) Jonathan Milan (Lidl–Trek)	(Serbia) Đorđe Đurić (Team Solution Tech–Vini Fantini)	(Spain) Iván Romeo (Movistar Team)
2026	(Mexico) Isaac del Toro (UAE Team Emirates XRG)	(Italy) Jonathan Milan (Lidl–Trek)	(Switzerland) Silvan Dillier (Alpecin–Premier Tech)	(Mexico) Isaac del Toro (UAE Team Emirates XRG)

==== Wins per country ====
Wins	Country
4	Slovenia
2	Belgium
1	Great Britain
1	Mexico

=== Elite Women ===
Years	General classification	Points classification	Sprints classification	Young rider classification
2023	(Italy) Elisa Longo Borghini (Trek–Segafredo)	(Netherlands) Charlotte Kool (Team DSM)	(Poland) Agnieszka Skalniak-Sójka (Canyon//SRAM)	(Italy) Gaia Realini (Trek–Segafredo)
2024	(Belgium) Lotte Kopecky (Team SD Worx–Protime)	(Netherlands) Lorena Wiebes (Team SD Worx–Protime)	(Belgium) Lotte Kopecky (Team SD Worx–Protime)	(Australia) Neve Bradbury (Canyon//SRAM)
2025	(Italy) Elisa Longo Borghini (UAE Team ADQ)	(Netherlands) Lorena Wiebes (Team SD Worx–Protime)	(Republic of Ireland) Lara Gillespie (UAE Team ADQ)	(Germany) Antonia Niedermaier (Canyon//SRAM Zondacrypto)
2026	(Italy) Elisa Longo Borghini (UAE Team ADQ)	(Netherlands) Lorena Wiebes (Team SD Worx–Protime)	(Italy) Sara Luccon (Top Girls Fassa Bortolo)	(Italy) Eleonora Ciabocco (Team Picnic–PostNL)

==== Wins per country ====
Wins	Country
3	Italy
1	Belgium

== See also ==
- Dubai Tour, predecessor event held from 2014 to 2018
- Abu Dhabi Tour, predecessor event held from 2015 to 2017
