= Abu Dhabi Tour =

Men's cycling stage race

Race details
- Date: October (2015–2016); February (2017–2018)
- Region: Abu Dhabi
- Discipline: Road
- Competition: UCI Asia Tour
- Type: Stage race
- Organiser: RCS Sport
- Web site: www.abudhabitour.com

History
- First edition: 2015
- Editions: 4
- Final edition: 2018
- First winner: Esteban Chaves (COL)
- Most wins: No repeat winners
- Final winner: Alejandro Valverde (ESP)

The Abu Dhabi Tour was a men's cycling stage race that took place in the United Arab Emirates, held annually between 2015 and 2018. In 2019, the Abu Dhabi Tour merged with the Dubai Tour to become the UAE Tour.

== History ==
When inaugurated, it was part of the UCI Asia Tour, ranked as a category 2.HC event, the second tier of professional stage races. The race was initially scheduled for October, as one of the last races of the cycling season, occupying the calendar slot formerly held by the cancelled Tour of Beijing. The event is organised by RCS Sport, which also organises the Giro d'Italia and the nearby Dubai Tour.

In 2015 UCI organized the first International Cycling Gala on the evening of the final day of the Abu Dhabi Tour, to celebrate the end of the cycling season. The event's organizers expressed their hope that the race be included in the UCI World Tour. In 2016 the Abu Dhabi Tour started two days after the Cycling Gala in the week following the Road World Championships in Qatar.

The third edition of the Abu Dhabi Tour was added to the 2017 UCI World Tour and was held at the beginning of the season, in February 2017. The final edition of the race took place in February 2018.

In September 2018, it was announced that the Abu Dhabi Tour would merge with the Dubai Tour to become the UAE Tour from 2019.

== Route ==
The first two editions of the race were made up of four stages; three of which flat and suited to the sprinters and one mountain-top finish at Jebel Hafeet. The final stage was a circuit race around the Yas Marina motor-racing track which take place at twilight, as does the Formula 1 Abu Dhabi Grand Prix.

== Overall winners ==
Year	Country	Rider	Team
2015	Colombia	Esteban Chaves	Orica–GreenEDGE
2016	Estonia	Tanel Kangert	Astana
2017	Portugal	Rui Costa	UAE Team Emirates
2018	Spain	Alejandro Valverde	Movistar Team
