= Esteban Chaves =

Colombian road racing cyclist

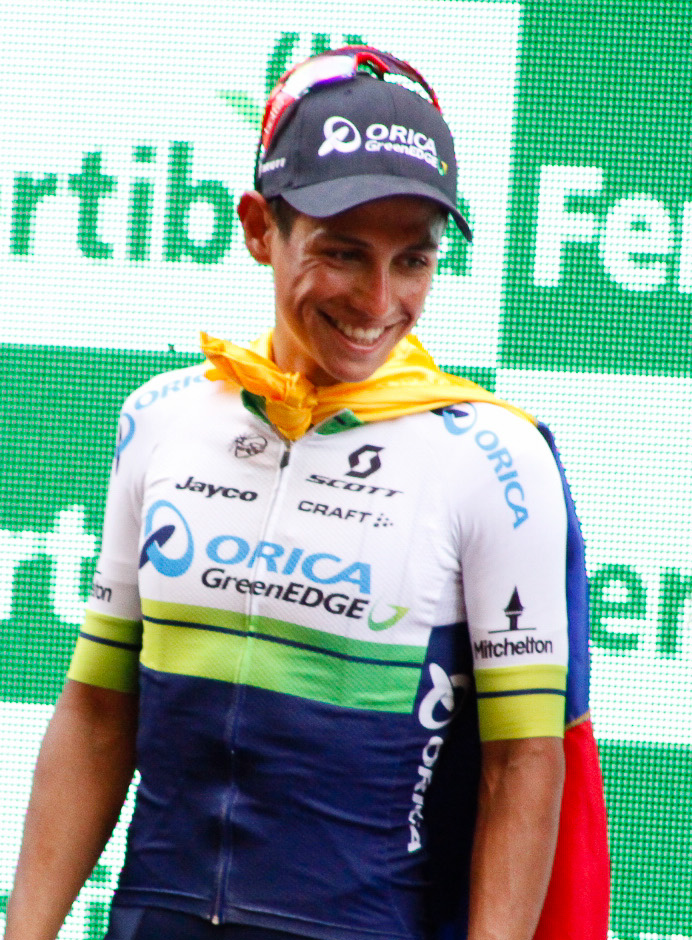
- Chaves at the 2015 Vuelta a España

Personal information
- Full name: Jhoan Esteban Chaves Rubio
- Nicknames: Chavito, El Chivo, the Smiling Assassin
- Born: 17 January 1990 (age 36) Bogotá, Colombia
- Height: 1.64 m (5 ft 5 in)
- Weight: 54 kg (119 lb)

Cycling career
- Sport: Cycling
- Discipline: Road
- Role: Rider
- Rider type: Climber

Amateur team
- 2009–2011: Colombia es Pasión–Coldeportes

Professional teams
- 2012–2013: Colombia–Coldeportes
- 2014–2021: Orica–GreenEDGE
- 2022–2025: EF Education–EasyPost

Major wins
- Grand Tours Giro d'Italia 3 individual stages (2016, 2018, 2019) 1 TTT stage (2015) Vuelta a España 2 individual stages (2015) Stage races Abu Dhabi Tour (2015) One-day races and Classics National Road Race Championships (2023) Giro di Lombardia (2016) Giro dell'Emilia (2016)

Jhoan Esteban Chaves Rubio (born 17 January 1990) is a Colombian former professional road bicycle racer, who last rode for UCI WorldTeam EF Education–EasyPost. Born in Bogotá, Chaves has competed as a professional since the start of the 2012 season, having signed for the Colombia–Coldeportes team as a neo-pro, after three seasons as an amateur with the Colombia es Pasión–Coldeportes team. Chaves is a two-time grand tour podium finisher, and a monument winner.

== Career ==
=== Early career ===
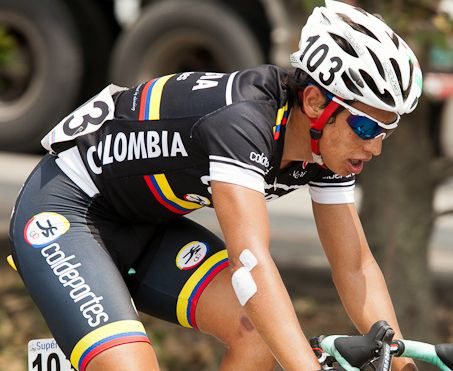
Chaves riding for the Colombia–Coldeportes team in 2012

As an amateur, Chaves was the winner of the French Tour de l'Avenir race in 2011, a race previously won by five future winners of the Tour de France. Chaves had been part of the breakaway on the first road stage of the race, taking the mountains jersey after the stage. He surrendered that lead to Garikoitz Bravo the next day, but reclaimed the lead on the third stage, having led the field over the Grand Ballon. Bravo took the lead again after the fourth stage until the end of the race, but Chaves moved into contention for the overall honours with several top-ten stage finishes, and trailed race leader David Boily by seven seconds before the final stage, in Alba, Italy. Chaves was part of a four-rider breakaway that moved clear of the field after the penultimate climb, and although he was beaten to the line by Warren Barguil and Mattia Cattaneo, Chaves's third place, coupled with a 24-second time gap to the field, allowed him to win the race by 17 seconds.

=== Colombia–Coldeportes (2012–13) ===
Chaves turned professional with the newly formed Colombia–Coldeportes team for the 2012 season, as his former team Colombia es Pasión–Café de Colombia returned to the domestic ranks in Colombia. He competed in several of the early-season Italian races, including Tirreno–Adriatico, but withdrew from the race on the penultimate day. After finishing 18th in his home race, the Vuelta a Colombia, Chaves returned to Europe for the Prueba Villafranca de Ordizia single-day race in the Basque Country. Chaves made an attack with 10 km (6.2 mi) remaining but Euskaltel–Euskadi's Gorka Izagirre shadowed his move, with Izagirre eventually beating Chaves in the sprint finish. Chaves continued his form into the Vuelta a Burgos, where he won the final stage of the race. Team Sky team-mates Rigoberto Urán and Sergio Henao animated the field on the final climb to Lagunas de Neila, and only Chaves was able to follow the pair; Chaves ultimately beat his former team-mate to take his first professional victory on the line, and allowed him to finish the race in third place overall. The following weekend, Chaves took victory in the Gran Premio Città di Camaiore in Italy, from a five-rider group, after forming the group with Italian national champion Franco Pellizotti of the Androni Giocattoli–Venezuela team, on the Monte Pitoro climb.

Chaves suffered severe injuries in a crash at the Trofeo Laigueglia in February 2013. The team doctor revealed that he had a compound fracture to his right clavicle, fractures in his left petrous bone, right cheekbone, maxillary sinuses and sphenoid bone, and also received pulmonary compressions, abrasions and suspected rib fractures.

=== Orica–GreenEDGE (2014–2021) ===
Chaves moved to the Orica–GreenEDGE team for the 2014 season, on an initial two-year contract.

==== 2015 ====
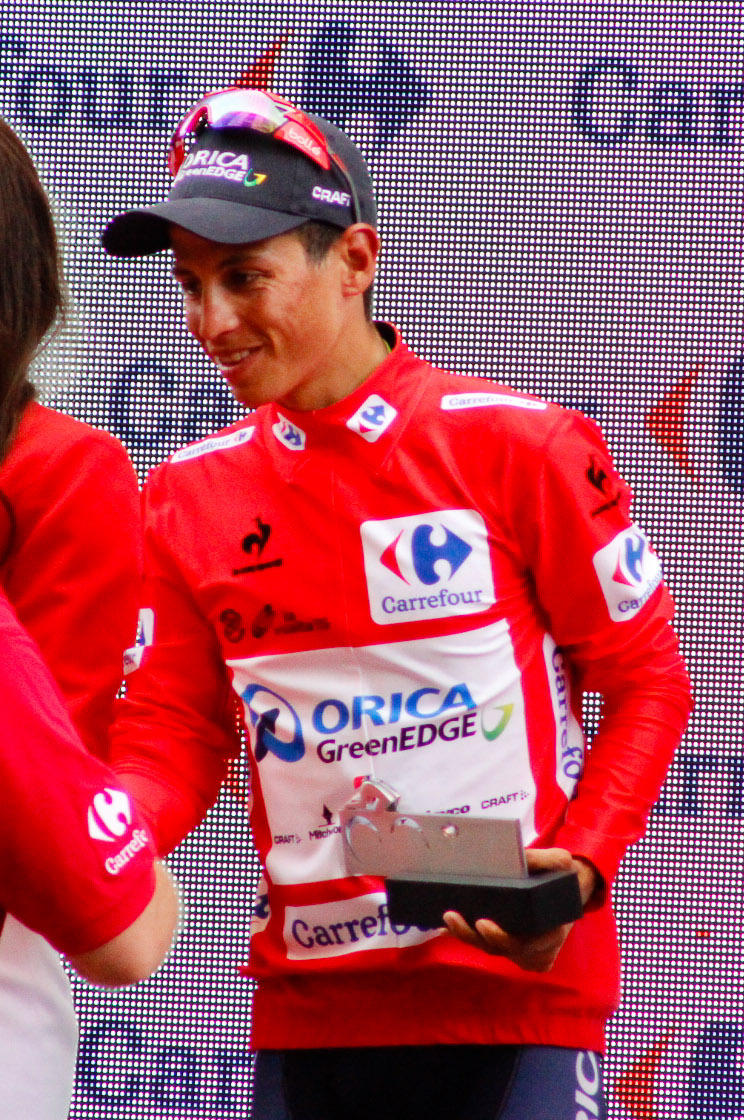
Chaves wearing the red jersey of general classification leader, at the 2015 Vuelta a España

At the Vuelta a España, Chaves won stage 2 by outsprinting Tom Dumoulin (Team Giant–Alpecin) and Nicolas Roche (Team Sky) at the summit of the final third category climb of Caminito del Rey. By doing so he took the overall race lead. Chaves lost the race lead on stage 5, as he was caught out in a split in the peloton at the finish and dropped 6 seconds to Dumoulin. However, on stage 6 Chaves attacked 2 kilometres (1.2 miles) from the summit of the final climb to Sierra de Cazorla and held off Dan Martin (Cannondale–Garmin) and Dumoulin by five seconds for his second stage win and retake the race lead. During the Vuelta Chaves extended his contract for a further three years. He eventually finished the Vuelta in fifth place overall.

==== 2016–2017 ====
2016 was a strong season for him as he finished second in the Giro d'Italia and third in the Vuelta a España. On 1 October, Chaves won Il Lombardia, his – and Colombia's – first victory in one of cycling's "monuments".

In June 2017, he was named in the startlist for the Tour de France. He struggled at the event, eventually finishing 62nd in the general classification, almost two-and-a-half hours down on winner Chris Froome. He returned to the Vuelta a España later in the year. He showed good form in the opening stages, but later slipped back to finish eleventh overall.

==== 2018 ====
Chaves started his 2018 campaign at the Cadel Evans Great Ocean Road Race, before starting the Herald Sun Tour. He broke away from the peloton at the final ascent of the penultimate stage, taking the victory and the lead in the overall classification. He held on to his lead to win the event overall the next day, his second victory in a stage race. Chaves also rode the Giro d'Italia as his season highlight, winning stage 6.

==== 2019 ====
On 31 May, Chaves won stage 19 of the Giro d'Italia from the breakaway, his first victory in over a year.

=== EF Education–EasyPost ===
After eight seasons with Team BikeExchange and its precursors, Chaves signed for the EF Education–EasyPost team for the 2022 season.

== Major results ==
2006
2nd Road race, National Novice Road Championships
2009
1st Stage 1 Vuelta a Cundinamarca
2010
5th Overall Circuito de Combita
2011
1st Overall Tour de l'Avenir
1st Stage 1 Clásica Club Deportivo Boyacá
3rd Overall Circuito de Combita
2012 (2 pro wins)
1st Gran Premio Città di Camaiore
1st Young rider classification, Vuelta a Colombia
2nd Prueba Villafranca de Ordizia
3rd Overall Vuelta a Burgos

1st Young rider classification
1st Stage 5

5th Memorial Marco Pantani
6th Road race, UCI Under-23 Road World Championships
2014 (2)
1st Stage 8 Tour de Suisse
3rd Overall Tour of Beijing

1st Young rider classification

4th Overall Tour de Langkawi
7th Overall Tour of California

1st Stage 6

2015 (4)
1st Overall Abu Dhabi Tour

1st Young rider classification
1st Stage 3

Giro d'Italia

1st Stage 1 (TTT)
Held after Stage 4

5th Overall Vuelta a España

1st Stages 2 & 6
Held after Stages 2–4 & 6–8
Held after Stages 2–3 & 7–14
Held after Stage 2
Held after Stages 2–8

8th Giro di Lombardia
2016 (3)
1st Giro di Lombardia
1st Giro dell'Emilia
2nd Overall Giro d'Italia

1st Stage 14
Held after Stage 19

3rd Overall Vuelta a España
9th UCI World Tour
2017
2nd Overall Tour Down Under
9th Overall Herald Sun Tour
2018 (3)
1st Overall Herald Sun Tour

1st Stage 3

Giro d'Italia

1st Stage 6
Held after Stages 6–8

2019 (1)
1st Stage 19 Giro d'Italia
6th Overall Tour of Slovenia
2020
4th Overall Vuelta a Burgos
5th Time trial, National Road Championships
7th Overall Tour Colombia
2021 (1)
3rd Grand Prix of Aargau Canton
6th Overall Volta a Catalunya

1st Points classification
1st Mountains classification
1st Stage 4

8th La Flèche Wallonne
9th Overall Tour of the Basque Country
10th Overall Tour de Suisse
2022
National Road Championships

2nd Time trial
3rd Road race

2nd Mont Ventoux Dénivelé Challenge
4th Coppa Sabatini
5th Giro della Toscana
6th Overall Tour de Langkawi
7th Overall Critérium du Dauphiné
9th Overall Tour of Norway
2023 (1)
1st Road race, National Road Championships
2024
8th Overall Tour Colombia
2025
4th Andorra MoraBanc Clàssica
8th Overall Tour of Austria

=== General classification results timeline ===
Grand Tour general classification results
Grand Tour	2012	2013	2014	2015	2016	2017	2018	2019	2020	2021	2022	2023	2024	2025
Giro d'Italia	—	—	—	55	2	—	72	40	—	—	—	—	35	—
Tour de France	—	—	—	—	—	62	—	—	23	13	—	DNF	—	—
Vuelta a España	—	—	41	5	3	11	—	19	27	—	DNF	—	—	DNF
Major stage race general classification results
Race	2012	2013	2014	2015	2016	2017	2018	2019	2020	2021	2022	2023	2024	2025
Paris–Nice	—	—	—	—	—	—	DNF	51	—	—	—	—	—	—
Tirreno–Adriatico	DNF	—	—	—	30	—	—	—	—	—	—	—	—	40
Volta a Catalunya	—	—	46	13	48	—	DNF	34	NH	6	44	11	22	30
Tour of the Basque Country	—	—	101	21	—	—	—	—	NH	9	—	12	16	—
Tour de Romandie	Has not contested during his career													
Critérium du Dauphiné	—	—	—	—	—	26	—	—	—	—	7	32	—	20
Tour de Suisse	—	—	16	14	—	—	—	—	NH	10	—	—	—	—

=== Monuments results timeline ===
Monument	2012	2013	2014	2015	2016	2017	2018	2019	2020	2021	2022	2023
Milan–San Remo	Has not contested during his career											
Tour of Flanders	Has not contested during his career											
Paris–Roubaix	Has not contested during his career											
Liège–Bastogne–Liège	—	—	—	68	—	—	—	—	—	14	—	45
Giro di Lombardia	DNF	—	—	8	1	—	—	70	—	—	—	75

Legend
—	Did not compete
IP	In progress
DNF	Did not finish
NH	Not held
