= Dubai Tour =

Emirati multi-day road cycling race

Race details
- Date: February
- Region: Dubai
- Discipline: Road
- Competition: UCI Asia Tour 2.HC
- Type: Stage race
- Organiser: Dubai Sports Council and RCS Sport
- Web site: dubaitour.com

History
- First edition: 2014
- Editions: 5
- Final edition: 2018
- First winner: Taylor Phinney (USA)
- Most wins: Marcel Kittel (GER) (2 wins)
- Final winner: Elia Viviani (ITA)

The Dubai Tour was an annual professional road bicycle racing stage race held in Dubai, which began in 2014 as part of the UCI Asia Tour. It merged with the Abu Dhabi Tour to become the UAE Tour from 2019.

== History ==
The race was classified as a 2.1. in 2014, meaning that more ProTeams can participate in the event. The race is organized by the Dubai Sports Council in partnership with RCS Sport, and was held for the first time between 5 and 8 February 2014. The race is a men's competition consisting of four stages. The race contains mainly flat stages, with some hillier parts. In 2015, the second edition of the race has been upgraded to 2.HC, meaning that more UCI World Tour teams can compete in the event.

During the race, the leader of the general classification wears a blue jersey, the leader of points classification is denoted by a red jersey and best young rider by white. The race does not award a mountains jersey.

In September 2018, it was announced that the Dubai Tour would merge with the Abu Dhabi Tour to become the UAE Tour from 2019.

== Past winners ==
Year	Country	Rider	Team
2014	United States	Taylor Phinney	BMC Racing Team
2015	Great Britain	Mark Cavendish	Etixx–Quick-Step
2016	Germany	Marcel Kittel	Etixx–Quick-Step
2017	Germany	Marcel Kittel	Quick-Step Floors
2018	Italy	Elia Viviani	Quick-Step Floors
