= UCI World Tour =

Premier men's elite road cycling tour

- Current season, competition or edition: 2026 UCI World Tour
- Sport: Cycling
- Founded: 2009
- Organising body: Union Cycliste Internationale
- No. of teams: 18 (Others invited on race by race basis)
- Countries: International
- Most recent champions: Rider: Simon Yates (2018); Team: Quick Step (2018)
- Most titles: Rider: (Spain) Joaquim Rodríguez (3 titles); Team: Movistar Team (4 titles)
- Website: UCI.org

The UCI World Tour (stylized as WorldTour) is the premier men's elite road cycling tour, sitting above the UCI ProSeries and various regional UCI Continental Circuits. It refers to both the tour of 38 events and, until 2019, an annual ranking system based upon performances in these. The World Ranking was launched in 2009, (known from 2009–2010 as the UCI World Ranking) and merged fully with its predecessor the UCI ProTour in 2011. UCI WorldTeams must compete at all events that were part of the tour prior to the 2017 expansion.

== History ==
Until the end of 2004, the Union Cycliste Internationale (UCI) maintained both the UCI Road World Rankings, which awarded results for all its sanctioned races, and the UCI Road World Cup, which was awarded on the basis of performance in ten selected one-day events. Both were replaced from the 2005 season by the UCI ProTour and UCI Continental Circuits. However, disputes between the UCI and ASO, the organisers of the Tour de France and other classics, and eventually with the organisers of the Tours of Italy and Spain, meant that by 2008 the ProTour was devalued as a ranking method, as only one of the Monument events, and three other classics, remained under the auspices of the UCI. As a result, the UCI World Ranking was introduced, merging performances from both the ProTour and other prestigious events.

At the start of 2011, the ProTour and World Ranking were fully merged again. The ranking system was re-branded as the 'World Tour', whilst 'ProTeam' was retained as a registration category for professional teams. All ProTeams gain automatic entry to World Tour events.

Despite finishing second in the team rankings in 2012, Team Katusha were initially refused a place in the top tier for 2013. After appeal to the Court of Arbitration for Sport, they were reinstated in February 2013, having already missed the 2013 Tour Down Under. Although the UCI had earlier asserted that the reinstatement of Katusha would result in demotion of another team, they eventually announced that there would be 19 ProTour teams for that one season. In 2015, there are only 17 teams, as there was no applicant for the 18th slot.

For the 2017 season the UCI added 10 new events to the calendar, bringing the total number of events to 38. The new events are: Tour of California, Tour of Qatar, Abu Dhabi Tour, Tour of Turkey, Dwars door Vlaanderen, Omloop Het Nieuwsblad, Cadel Evans Great Ocean Road Race, London–Surrey Classic, Eschborn–Frankfurt City Loop and Strade Bianche.

In 2019, the Three Days of De Panne (a one-day race, although its name retains a description of its former format) was added to the tour, and the Abu Dhabi Tour, having merged with the 2.HC ranked Dubai Tour, was rebranded as the UAE Tour. The World Tour ceased to be a ranking series, replaced in this regard by the UCI World Ranking.

== Events (since 2019) ==
The UCI World Tour consists of 36 events. These events are made up from:

- The three Grand Tours
- The five Monument one-day races
- Nine further stage races in Europe
- Thirteen further one-day races in Europe
- One stage race in Australia
- One stage race in United Arab Emirates
- One stage race in China
- One one-day race in Australia
- Two one-day races in Canada

Race		World Ranking Points (2026)			
Race		Winner	Second	Third	final position for which points are given
Tour de France	Overall	1300	1040	880	60th (15 points)
Tour de France	Each stage	210	150	110	15th (5 points)
(Italy) Giro d'Italia (Spain) Vuelta a España	Overall	1100	885	750	60th (10 points)
(Italy) Giro d'Italia (Spain) Vuelta a España	Each stage	180	130	95	15th (2 points)
(Italy) Giro di Lombardia (Italy) Milan–San Remo (Belgium) Tour of Flanders (France) Paris–Roubaix (Belgium) Liège–Bastogne–Liège		800	640	520	60th (5 points)
(Australia) Tour Down Under (France) Paris–Nice (Italy) Tirreno–Adriatico (Switzerland) Tour de Romandie (France) Tour Auvergne-Rhône-Alpes (Switzerland) Tour de Suisse (United Arab Emirates) UAE Tour (Note: Prior to its merger with the Dubai Tour in 2019, this was known as the Abu Dhabi Tour.)	Overall	500	400	325	60th (3 points)
(Australia) Tour Down Under (France) Paris–Nice (Italy) Tirreno–Adriatico (Switzerland) Tour de Romandie (France) Tour Auvergne-Rhône-Alpes (Switzerland) Tour de Suisse (United Arab Emirates) UAE Tour	Each stage	60	40	30	10th (2 points)
(Netherlands) Amstel Gold Race (Belgium) Gent–Wevelgem (Belgium) La Flèche Wallonne (Canada) Grand Prix Cycliste de Québec (Canada) Grand Prix Cycliste de Montréal (Italy) Strade Bianche		500	400	325	60th (3 points)
(Spain) Volta a Catalunya (Spain) Tour of the Basque Country (Poland) Tour de Pologne (Belgium) (Netherlands) Benelux Tour (China) Tour of Guangxi	Overall	400	320	260	60th (2 points)
(Spain) Volta a Catalunya (Spain) Tour of the Basque Country (Poland) Tour de Pologne (Belgium) (Netherlands) Benelux Tour (China) Tour of Guangxi	Each stage	50	30	25	10th (1 point)
(Belgium) E3 Saxo Classic (Spain) Clásica de San Sebastián (Germany) Hamburg Cyclassics; GP Ouest-France (Belgium) Omloop Het Nieuwsblad (Belgium) Dwars door Vlaanderen (Australia) Great Ocean Road Race (Germany) Eschborn–Frankfurt (Belgium) Tour of Bruges (Denmark) Copenhagen Sprint		400	320	260	60th (2 points)

In 2009 and 2010, only riders for ProTour teams and Professional Continental teams could earn points. When a national squad, that is not a UCI registered team, participated in a race, its members were not eligible to receive points. In 2011, a rule change meant that only riders on ProTeam squads were eligible for points.

From 2012 to 2015, the team time trial at the UCI Road World Championships contributed points to the team classification only.

== Results (2009–2018) ==
Since 2019, the UCI Men's road racing world ranking, which includes points earned in races that are not part of the WorldTour, has superseded the points allocations for this series of races as the official rankings table for the sport.

=== Individual ranking ===
Year	1st		2nd		3rd		4th		5th	
2009	(Spain) Alberto Contador; Astana	527 pts	(Spain) Alejandro Valverde; Caisse d'Epargne	483 pts	(Spain) Samuel Sánchez; Euskaltel–Euskadi	357 pts	(Luxembourg) Andy Schleck; Team Saxo Bank	334 pts	(Australia) Cadel Evans; Silence–Lotto	333 pts
2010	(Spain) Joaquim Rodríguez; Team Katusha	561 pts	(Belgium) Philippe Gilbert; Omega Pharma–Lotto	437 pts	(Spain) Luis León Sánchez; Caisse d'Epargne	413 pts	(Australia) Cadel Evans; BMC Racing Team	390 pts	(Italy) Vincenzo Nibali; Liquigas–Doimo	390 pts
2011	(Belgium) Philippe Gilbert; Omega Pharma–Lotto	718 pts	(Australia) Cadel Evans; BMC Racing Team	584 pts	(Spain) Joaquim Rodríguez; Team Katusha	446 pts	(Italy) Michele Scarponi; Lampre–ISD	419 pts	(Germany) Tony Martin; HTC–Highroad	349 pts
2012	(Spain) Joaquim Rodríguez; Team Katusha	692 pts	(United Kingdom) Bradley Wiggins; Team Sky	601 pts	(Belgium) Tom Boonen; Omega Pharma–Quick-Step	410 pts	(Italy) Vincenzo Nibali; Liquigas–Cannondale	400 pts	(Spain) Alejandro Valverde; Movistar Team	394 pts
2013	(Spain) Joaquim Rodríguez; Team Katusha	607 pts	(United Kingdom) Chris Froome; Team Sky	587 pts	(Spain) Alejandro Valverde; Movistar Team	540 pts	(Slovakia) Peter Sagan; Cannondale	491 pts	(Italy) Vincenzo Nibali; Astana	474 pts
2014	(Spain) Alejandro Valverde; Movistar Team	686 pts	(Spain) Alberto Contador; Tinkoff–Saxo	620 pts	(Australia) Simon Gerrans; Orica–GreenEDGE	478 pts	(Portugal) Rui Costa; Lampre–Merida	461 pts	(Italy) Vincenzo Nibali; Astana	392 pts
2015	(Spain) Alejandro Valverde; Movistar Team	675 pts	(Spain) Joaquim Rodríguez; Team Katusha	474 pts	(Colombia) Nairo Quintana; Movistar Team	457 pts	(Norway) Alexander Kristoff; Team Katusha	453 pts	(Italy) Fabio Aru; Astana	448 pts
2016	(Slovakia) Peter Sagan; Tinkoff	669 pts	(Colombia) Nairo Quintana; Movistar Team	609 pts	(United Kingdom) Chris Froome; Team Sky	564 pts	(Spain) Alejandro Valverde; Movistar Team	436 pts	(Spain) Alberto Contador; Tinkoff	428 pts
2017	(Belgium) Greg Van Avermaet; BMC Racing Team	3582 pts	(United Kingdom) Chris Froome; Team Sky	3452 pts	(Netherlands) Tom Dumoulin; Team Sunweb	2545 pts	(Slovakia) Peter Sagan; Bora–Hansgrohe	2544 pts	(Italy) Vincenzo Nibali; Bahrain–Merida	2196 pts
2018	(United Kingdom) Simon Yates; Mitchelton–Scott	3072 pts	(Slovakia) Peter Sagan; Bora–Hansgrohe	2992 pts	(Spain) Alejandro Valverde; Movistar Team	2609 pts	(United Kingdom) Geraint Thomas; Team Sky	2534 pts	(Belgium) Greg Van Avermaet; BMC Racing Team	2442 pts

=== Team ranking ===
Year	1st	2nd	3rd
2009	Astana	Caisse d'Epargne	Team Columbia–High Road
2010	Team Saxo Bank	Liquigas–Doimo	Rabobank
2011	Omega Pharma–Lotto	Team Sky	Leopard Trek
2012	Team Sky	Team Katusha	Liquigas–Cannondale
2013	Movistar Team	Team Sky	Team Katusha
2014	Movistar Team	BMC Racing Team	Tinkoff–Saxo
2015	Movistar Team	Team Katusha	Team Sky
2016	Movistar Team	Tinkoff	Team Sky
2017	Team Sky	Quick-Step Floors	BMC Racing Team
2018	Quick-Step Floors	Team Sky	Bora–Hansgrohe

=== Nation ranking ===
Year	1st	2nd	3rd
2009	Spain	Italy	Australia
2010	Spain	Italy	Belgium
2011	Italy	Belgium	Australia
2012	Spain	Great Britain	Italy
2013	Spain	Italy	Colombia
2014	Spain	Italy	Belgium
2015	Spain	Italy	Colombia
2016	Spain	Colombia	Great Britain
2017	Belgium	Italy	France
2018	Belgium	France	Italy

== Wins by race ==
=== 2009–2016 ===
Year	2009	2010	2011	2012	2013	2014	2015	2016
(Australia) Tour Down Under	(Australia) Davis	(Germany) Greipel (1/2)	(Australia) Meyer	(Australia) Gerrans (2/9)	(Netherlands) Slagter	(Australia) Gerrans (5/9)	(Australia) Dennis	(Australia) Gerrans (9/9)
(France) Paris–Nice	(Spain) LL Sánchez (1/3)	(Spain) Contador (3/9)	(Germany) T Martin (2/4)	(United Kingdom) Wiggins (2/5)	(Australia) Porte (1/8)	(Colombia) Betancur	(Australia) Porte (2/8)	(United Kingdom) Thomas (2/6)
(Italy) Tirreno–Adriatico	(Italy) Scarponi (1/3)	(Italy) Garzelli	(Australia) Evans (2/4)	(Italy) Nibali (2/9)	(Italy) Nibali (3/9)	(Spain) Contador (5/9)	(Colombia) Quintana (3/7)	(Belgium) Van Avermaet (1/7)
(Italy) Milan–San Remo	(United Kingdom) Cavendish	(Spain) Freire	(Australia) Goss (2/2)	(Australia) Gerrans (3/9)	(Germany) Ciolek	(Norway) Kristoff (1/8)	(Germany) Degenkolb (3/4)	(France) Démare (2/2)
(Spain) Volta Ciclista a Catalunya	(Spain) Valverde (1/14)	(Spain) J Rodríguez (1/6)	(Italy) Scarponi (2/3)	(Switzerland) Albasini	(Republic of Ireland) D Martin (2/4)	(Spain) J Rodríguez (5/6)	(Australia) Porte (3/8)	(Colombia) Quintana (4/7)
(Belgium) Record Bank E3 Harelbeke	Part of the UCI Europe Tour			(Belgium) Boonen (3/6)	(Switzerland) Cancellara (4/7)	(Slovakia) Sagan (4/10)	(United Kingdom) Thomas (1/6)	(Poland) Kwiatkowski (2/8)
(Belgium) Gent–Wevelgem	(Norway) Boasson Hagen (1/5)	(Austria) Eisel	(Belgium) Boonen (2/6)	(Belgium) Boonen (4/6)	(Slovakia) Sagan (2/10)	(Germany) Degenkolb (2/4)	(Italy) Paolini	(Slovakia) Sagan (5/10)
(Belgium) Ronde van Vlaanderen	(Belgium) Devolder	(Switzerland) Cancellara (2/7)	(Belgium) Nuyens	(Belgium) Boonen (5/6)	(Switzerland) Cancellara (5/7)	(Switzerland) Cancellara (7/7)	(Norway) Kristoff (3/8)	(Slovakia) Sagan (6/10)
(Spain) Vuelta al País Vasco	(Spain) Contador (1/9)	(United States) Horner (1/2)	(Germany) Klöden	(Spain) S Sánchez	(Colombia) Quintana (1/7)	(Spain) Contador (6/9)	(Spain) J Rodríguez (6/6)	(Spain) Contador (9/9)
(France) Paris–Roubaix	(Belgium) Boonen (1/6)	(Switzerland) Cancellara (3/7)	(Belgium) Vansummeren	(Belgium) Boonen (6/6)	(Switzerland) Cancellara (6/7)	(Netherlands) Terpstra (1/4)	(Germany) Degenkolb (4/4)	(Australia) Hayman
(Netherlands) Amstel Gold Race	(Russia) Ivanov	(Belgium) Gilbert (2/13)	(Belgium) Gilbert (4/13)	(Italy) Gasparotto (1/2)	(Czech Republic) Kreuziger (2/2)	(Belgium) Gilbert (9/13)	(Poland) Kwiatkowski (1/8)	(Italy) Gasparotto (2/2)
(Belgium) La Flèche Wallonne	(Italy) Rebellin	(Australia) Evans (1/4)	(Belgium) Gilbert (5/13)	(Spain) J Rodríguez (2/6)	(Spain) Moreno	(Spain) Valverde (4/14)	(Spain) Valverde (6/14)	(Spain) Valverde (8/14)
(Belgium) Liège–Bastogne–Liège	(Luxembourg) A Schleck (1/2)	(Kazakhstan) Vinokourov	(Belgium) Gilbert (6/13)	(Kazakhstan) Iglinsky	(Republic of Ireland) D Martin (3/4)	(Australia) Gerrans (6/9)	(Spain) Valverde (7/14)	(Netherlands) Poels
(Switzerland) Tour de Romandie	(Czech Republic) Kreuziger (1/2)	(Slovenia) Špilak (1/3)	(Australia) Evans (3/4)	(United Kingdom) Wiggins (3/5)	(United Kingdom) Froome (2/12)	(United Kingdom) Froome (5/12)	(Russia) Zakarin	(Colombia) Quintana (5/7)
(Italy) Giro d'Italia	(Russia) Menchov	(Italy) Basso	(Italy) Scarponi (3/3)	(Canada) Hesjedal	(Italy) Nibali (4/9)	(Colombia) Quintana (2/7)	(Spain) Contador (8/9)	(Italy) Nibali (7/9)
(France) Critérium du Dauphiné	(Spain) Valverde (2/14)	(Slovenia) Brajkovič	(United Kingdom) Wiggins (1/5)	(United Kingdom) Wiggins (4/5)	(United Kingdom) Froome (3/12)	(United States) Talansky	(United Kingdom) Froome (6/12)	(United Kingdom) Froome (8/12)
(Switzerland) Tour de Suisse	(Switzerland) Cancellara (1/7)	(Luxembourg) F Schleck	(United States) Leipheimer	(Portugal) Costa (2/5)	(Portugal) Costa (3/5)	(Portugal) Costa (4/5)	(Slovenia) Špilak (2/3)	(Colombia) López (1/2)
Tour de France	(Spain) Contador (2/9)	(Luxembourg) A Schleck (2/2)	(Australia) Evans (4/4)	(United Kingdom) Wiggins (5/5)	(United Kingdom) Froome (4/12)	(Italy) Nibali (5/9)	(United Kingdom) Froome (7/12)	(United Kingdom) Froome (9/12)
(Spain) Clásica Ciclista San Sebastián	(Spain) Barredo	(Spain) LL Sánchez (2/3)	(Belgium) Gilbert (7/13)	(Spain) LL Sánchez (3/3)	(France) Gallopin	(Spain) Valverde (5/14)	(United Kingdom) A Yates (1/6)	(Netherlands) Mollema (1/2)
(Poland) Tour de Pologne	(Italy) Ballan	(Republic of Ireland) D Martin (1/4)	(Slovakia) Sagan (1/10)	(Italy) Moser	(Netherlands) Weening	(Poland) Majka	(Spain) Izagirre (1/2)	(Belgium) Wellens (4/7)
(Belgium) (Netherlands) BinckBank Tour	(Norway) Boasson Hagen (2/5)	(Germany) T Martin (1/4)	(Norway) Boasson Hagen (3/5)	(Netherlands) Boom	(Czech Republic) Štybar (1/3)	(Belgium) Wellens (1/7)	(Belgium) Wellens (2/7)	(Netherlands) Terpstra (2/4)
(Spain) Vuelta a España	(Spain) Valverde (3/14)	(Italy) Nibali (1/9)	(United Kingdom) Froome (1/12)	(Spain) Contador (4/9)	(United States) Horner (2/2)	(Spain) Contador (7/9)	(Italy) Aru	(Colombia) Quintana (6/7)
(Germany) Cyclassics Hamburg	(United States) Farrar (1/2)	(United States) Farrar (2/2)	(Norway) Boasson Hagen (4/5)	(France) Démare (1/2)	(Germany) Degenkolb (1/4)	(Norway) Kristoff (2/8)	(Germany) Greipel (2/2)	(Australia) Ewan
Bretagne Classic Ouest-France	(Australia) Gerrans (1/9)	(Australia) Goss (1/2)	(Slovenia) Bole	(Norway) Boasson Hagen (5/5)	(Italy) Pozzato	(France) Chavanel	(Norway) Kristoff (4/8)	(Belgium) Naesen (1/2)
(Canada) Grand Prix Cycliste de Québec	Not on calendar	(France) Voeckler	(Belgium) Gilbert (8/13)	(Australia) Gerrans (4/9)	(Netherlands) Gesink (2/2)	(Australia) Gerrans (7/9)	(Colombia) Urán	(Slovakia) Sagan (7/10)
(Canada) Grand Prix Cycliste de Montréal	Not on calendar	(Netherlands) Gesink (1/2)	(Portugal) Costa (1/5)	(Norway) Nordhaug	(Slovakia) Sagan (3/10)	(Australia) Gerrans (8/9)	(Belgium) Wellens (3/7)	(Belgium) Van Avermaet (2/7)
(Italy) Il Lombardia	(Belgium) Gilbert (1/13)	(Belgium) Gilbert (3/13)	(Switzerland) Zaugg	(Spain) J Rodríguez (3/6)	(Spain) J Rodríguez (4/6)	(Republic of Ireland) D Martin (4/4)	(Italy) Nibali (6/9)	(Colombia) Chaves
(China) Tour of Beijing	Not on calendar		(Germany) T Martin (3/4)	(Germany) T Martin (4/4)	(Spain) Intxausti	(Belgium) Gilbert (10/13)	Not on calendar

=== 2017–2023 ===
Year	2017	2018	2019	2020	2021	2022	2023
(Australia) Tour Down Under	(Australia) Porte (4/8)	(South Africa) Impey (1/2)	(South Africa) Impey (2/2)	(Australia) Porte (7/8)	Cancelled		(Australia) Vine (1/2)
(Australia) Cadel Evans Great Ocean Road Race	(Germany) Arndt	(Australia) McCarthy	(Italy) Viviani (4/6)	(Belgium) Devenyns	Cancelled		(Germany) Mayrhofer
(United Arab Emirates) UAE Tour	(Portugal) Costa (5/5)	(Spain) Valverde (13/14)	(Slovenia) Roglič (3/18)	(United Kingdom) A Yates (2/6)	(Slovenia) Pogačar (3/39)	(Slovenia) Pogačar (8/39)	(Belgium) Evenepoel (6/11)
(Belgium) Omloop Het Nieuwsblad	(Belgium) Van Avermaet (3/7)	(Denmark) Valgren (1/2)	(Czech Republic) Štybar (2/3)	(Belgium) Stuyven (1/2)	(Italy) Ballerini	(Belgium) van Aert (5/9)	(Netherlands) van Baarle (3/3)
(Italy) Strade Bianche	(Poland) Kwiatkowski (3/8)	(Belgium) Benoot	(France) Alaphilippe (3/7)	(Belgium) van Aert (1/9)	(Netherlands) van der Poel (5/17)	(Slovenia) Pogačar (9/39)	(United Kingdom) Pidcock (1/2)
(France) Paris–Nice	(Colombia) Henao	(Spain) Soler	(Colombia) Bernal (2/5)	(Germany) Schachmann (1/2)	(Germany) Schachmann (2/2)	(Slovenia) Roglič (11/18)	(Slovenia) Pogačar (13/39)
(Italy) Tirreno–Adriatico	(Colombia) Quintana (7/7)	(Poland) Kwiatkowski (6/8)	(Slovenia) Roglič (4/18)	(United Kingdom) S Yates (2/3)	(Slovenia) Pogačar (4/39)	(Slovenia) Pogačar (10/39)	(Slovenia) Roglič (13/18)
(Italy) Milan–San Remo	(Poland) Kwiatkowski (4/8)	(Italy) Nibali (9/9)	(France) Alaphilippe (4/7)	(Belgium) van Aert (2/9)	(Belgium) Stuyven (2/2)	(Slovenia) Mohorič (2/3)	(Netherlands) van der Poel (8/17)
(Belgium) Classic Brugge-De Panne	Part of the UCI Europe Tour		(Netherlands) Groenewegen (1/2)	(Belgium) Lampaert (3/3)	(Republic of Ireland) S Bennett (1/2)	(Belgium) Merlier	(Belgium) Philipsen (2/7)
(Belgium) E3 BinckBank Classic	(Belgium) Van Avermaet (4/7)	(Netherlands) Terpstra (3/4)	(Czech Republic) Štybar (3/3)	Cancelled	(Denmark) Asgreen (1/2)	(Belgium) van Aert (6/9)	(Belgium) van Aert (8/9)
(Spain) Volta a Catalunya	(Spain) Valverde (9/14)	(Spain) Valverde (14/14)	(Colombia) López (2/2)	Cancelled	(United Kingdom) A Yates (3/6)	(Colombia) Higuita	(Slovenia) Roglič (14/18)
(Belgium) Gent–Wevelgem	(Belgium) Van Avermaet (5/7)	(Slovakia) Sagan (9/10)	(Norway) Kristoff (8/8)	(Denmark) Pedersen (1/4)	(Belgium) van Aert (3/9)	(Eritrea) Girmay	(France) Laporte (1/2)
(Belgium) Dwars door Vlaanderen	(Belgium) Lampaert (1/3)	(Belgium) Lampaert (2/3)	(Netherlands) van der Poel (1/17)	Cancelled	(Netherlands) van Baarle (1/3)	(Netherlands) van der Poel (6/17)	(France) Laporte (2/2)
(Belgium) Ronde van Vlaanderen	(Belgium) Gilbert (11/13)	(Netherlands) Terpstra (4/4)	(Italy) Bettiol	(Netherlands) van der Poel (4/17)	(Denmark) Asgreen (2/2)	(Netherlands) van der Poel (7/17)	(Slovenia) Pogačar (14/39)
(Spain) Itzulia Basque Country	(Spain) Valverde (10/14)	(Slovenia) Roglič (1/18)	(Spain) Izagirre (2/2)	Cancelled	(Slovenia) Roglič (9/18)	(Colombia) Martínez (2/2)	(Denmark) Vingegaard (2/10)
(France) Paris–Roubaix	(Belgium) Van Avermaet (6/7)	(Slovakia) Sagan (10/10)	(Belgium) Gilbert (13/13)	Cancelled	(Italy) Colbrelli (2/2)	(Netherlands) van Baarle (2/3)	(Netherlands) van der Poel (9/17)
Presidential Cycling Tour of Turkey	(Italy) Ulissi (2/2)	(Spain) Prades	(Austria) Großschartner	Part of the UCI ProSeries
(Netherlands) Amstel Gold Race	(Belgium) Gilbert (12/13)	(Denmark) Valgren (2/2)	(Netherlands) van der Poel (2/17)	Cancelled	(Belgium) van Aert (4/9)	(Poland) Kwiatkowski (8/8)	(Slovenia) Pogačar (15/39)
(Belgium) La Flèche Wallonne	(Spain) Valverde (11/14)	(France) Alaphilippe (1/7)	(France) Alaphilippe (5/7)	(Switzerland) Hirschi (1/3)	(France) Alaphilippe (6/7)	(Belgium) Teuns (2/2)	(Slovenia) Pogačar (16/39)
(Belgium) Liège–Bastogne–Liège	(Spain) Valverde (12/14)	(Luxembourg) Jungels	(Denmark) Fuglsang (2/4)	(Slovenia) Roglič (7/18)	(Slovenia) Pogačar (5/39)	(Belgium) Evenepoel (3/11)	(Belgium) Evenepoel (7/11)
(Germany) Eschborn–Frankfurt	(Norway) Kristoff (5/8)	(Norway) Kristoff (7/8)	(Germany) Ackermann (2/2)	Cancelled	(Belgium) Philipsen (1/7)	(Republic of Ireland) S Bennett (2/2)	(Denmark) Kragh Andersen
(Switzerland) Tour de Romandie	(Australia) Porte (5/8)	(Slovenia) Roglič (2/18)	(Slovenia) Roglič (5/18)	Cancelled	(United Kingdom) Thomas (5/6)	Vlasov (Note: As of 1 March 2022, the UCI announced that cyclists from Russia and Belarus would no longer compete under the name or flag of those respective countries due to the Russian invasion of Ukraine.)	(United Kingdom) A Yates (4/6)
(United States) Tour of California	(New Zealand) G Bennett	(Colombia) Bernal (1/5)	(Slovenia) Pogačar (1/39)	Not on calendar
(Italy) Giro d'Italia	(Netherlands) Dumoulin (1/2)	(United Kingdom) Froome (12/12)	(Ecuador) Carapaz (1/2)	(United Kingdom) Geoghegan Hart	(Colombia) Bernal (5/5)	(Australia) Hindley	(Slovenia) Roglič (15/18)
(France) Critérium du Dauphiné	(Denmark) Fuglsang (1/4)	(United Kingdom) Thomas (3/6)	(Denmark) Fuglsang (3/4)	(Colombia) Martínez (1/2)	(Australia) Porte (8/8)	(Slovenia) Roglič (12/18)	(Denmark) Vingegaard (3/10)
(Switzerland) Tour de Suisse	(Slovenia) Špilak (3/3)	(Australia) Porte (6/8)	(Colombia) Bernal (3/5)	Cancelled	(Ecuador) Carapaz (2/2)	(United Kingdom) Thomas (6/6)	(Denmark) Skjelmose (1/2)
Tour de France	(United Kingdom) Froome (10/12)	(United Kingdom) Thomas (4/6)	(Colombia) Bernal (4/5)	(Slovenia) Pogačar (2/39)	(Slovenia) Pogačar (6/39)	(Denmark) Vingegaard (1/10)	(Denmark) Vingegaard (4/10)
(Spain) Clásica San Sebastián	(Poland) Kwiatkowski (5/8)	(France) Alaphilippe (2/7)	(Belgium) Evenepoel (1/11)	Cancelled	(United States) Powless (1/2)	(Belgium) Evenepoel (4/11)	(Belgium) Evenepoel (8/11)
(United Kingdom) London–Surrey Classic	(Norway) Kristoff (6/8)	(Germany) Ackermann (1/2)	(Italy) Viviani (5/6)	Cancelled	Not on calendar
(Poland) Tour de Pologne	(Belgium) Teuns (1/2)	(Poland) Kwiatkowski (7/8)	(Russia) Sivakov	(Belgium) Evenepoel (2/11)	(Portugal) Almeida (1/4)	(United Kingdom) Hayter	(Slovenia) Mohorič (3/3)
(Belgium) (Netherlands) Benelux Tour	(Netherlands) Dumoulin (2/2)	(Slovenia) Mohorič (1/3)	(Belgium) De Plus	(Netherlands) van der Poel (3/17)	(Italy) Colbrelli (1/2)	Cancelled	(Belgium) Wellens (6/7)
(Germany) Hamburg Cyclassics	(Italy) Viviani (1/6)	(Italy) Viviani (3/6)	(Italy) Viviani (6/6)	Cancelled		(Austria) Haller	(Denmark) Pedersen (2/4)
Bretagne Classic-Ouest-France	(Italy) Viviani (2/6)	(Belgium) Naesen (2/2)	(Belgium) Vanmarcke	(Australia) Matthews (4/6)	(France) Cosnefroy (1/2)	(Belgium) van Aert (7/9)	(France) Madouas
(Spain) Vuelta a España	(United Kingdom) Froome (11/12)	(United Kingdom) S Yates (1/3)	(Slovenia) Roglič (6/18)	(Slovenia) Roglič (8/18)	(Slovenia) Roglič (10/18)	(Belgium) Evenepoel (5/11)	(United States) Kuss
(Canada) Grand Prix Cycliste de Québec	(Slovakia) Sagan (8/10)	(Australia) Matthews (1/6)	(Australia) Matthews (3/6)	Cancelled		(France) Cosnefroy (2/2)	(Belgium) De Lie (1/3)
(Canada) Grand Prix Cycliste de Montréal	(Italy) Ulissi (1/2)	(Australia) Matthews (2/6)	(Belgium) Van Avermaet (7/7)	Cancelled		(Slovenia) Pogačar (11/39)	(United Kingdom) A Yates (5/6)
(Italy) Il Lombardia	(Italy) Nibali (8/9)	(France) Pinot	(Netherlands) Mollema (2/2)	(Denmark) Fuglsang (4/4)	(Slovenia) Pogačar (7/39)	(Slovenia) Pogačar (12/39)	(Slovenia) Pogačar (17/39)
(China) Tour of Guangxi	(Belgium) Wellens (5/7)	(Italy) Moscon	(Spain) Mas (1/2)	Cancelled			(Netherlands) Vader

=== 2024–present ===
Year	2024	2025	2026	2027
(Australia) Tour Down Under	(United Kingdom) Williams (1/2)	(Ecuador) Narváez	(Australia) Vine (2/2)
(Australia) Cadel Evans Great Ocean Road Race	(New Zealand) Pithie	(Switzerland) Schmid	(Denmark) Andresen
(United Arab Emirates) UAE Tour	(Belgium) Van Eetvelt (1/2)	(Slovenia) Pogačar (25/39)	(Mexico) del Toro (1/4)
(Belgium) Omloop Het Nieuwsblad	(Slovenia) Tratnik	(Norway) Wærenskjold	(Netherlands) van der Poel (16/17)
(Italy) Strade Bianche	(Slovenia) Pogačar (18/39)	(Slovenia) Pogačar (26/39)	(Slovenia) Pogačar (33/39)
(France) Paris–Nice	(United States) Jorgenson (1/3)	(United States) Jorgenson (3/3)	(Denmark) Vingegaard (8/10)
(Italy) Tirreno–Adriatico	(Denmark) Vingegaard (5/10)	(Spain) Ayuso (2/2)	(Mexico) del Toro (2/4)
(Italy) Milan–San Remo	(Belgium) Philipsen (3/7	(Netherlands) van der Poel (13/16)	(Slovenia) Pogačar (34/39)
(Belgium) Classic Brugge-De Panne	(Belgium) Philipsen (4/7)	(Colombia) Molano	(Netherlands) Groenewegen (2/2)
(Belgium) E3 BinckBank Classic	(Netherlands) van der Poel (10/17)	(Netherlands) van der Poel (14/17)	(Netherlands) van der Poel (17/17)
(Spain) Volta a Catalunya	(Slovenia) Pogačar (19/39)	(Slovenia) Roglič (18/18)	(Denmark) Vingegaard (9/10)
(Belgium) Gent–Wevelgem	(Denmark) Pedersen (3/4)	(Denmark) Pedersen (4/4)	(Belgium) Philipsen (5/7)
(Belgium) Dwars door Vlaanderen	(United States) Jorgenson (2/3)	(United States) Powless (2/2)	(Italy) Ganna
(Belgium) Ronde van Vlaanderen	(Netherlands) van der Poel (11/17)	(Slovenia) Pogačar (27/39)	(Slovenia) Pogačar (35/39)
(Spain) Itzulia Basque Country	(Spain) Ayuso (1/2)	(Portugal) Almeida (2/4)	(France) Seixas (1/3)
(France) Paris–Roubaix	(Netherlands) van der Poel (12/17)	(Netherlands) van der Poel (15/17)	(Belgium) van Aert (9/9)
(Netherlands) Amstel Gold Race	(United Kingdom) Pidcock (2/2)	(Denmark) Skjelmose (2/2)	(Belgium) Evenepoel (9/11)
(Belgium) La Flèche Wallonne	(United Kingdom) Williams (2/2)	(Slovenia) Pogačar (28/39)	(France) Seixas (2/3)
(Belgium) Liège–Bastogne–Liège	(Slovenia) Pogačar (20/39)	(Slovenia) Pogačar (29/39)	(Slovenia) Pogačar (36/39)
(Switzerland) Tour de Romandie	(Spain) C Rodríguez	(Portugal) Almeida (3/4)	(Slovenia) Pogačar (37/39)
(Germany) Eschborn–Frankfurt	(Belgium) Van Gils	(Australia) Matthews (6/6)	(Germany) Zimmermann
(Italy) Giro d'Italia	(Slovenia) Pogačar (21/39)	(United Kingdom) S Yates (3/3)	(Denmark) Vingegaard (10/10)
(France) Critérium du Dauphiné	(Slovenia) Roglič (16/18)	(Slovenia) Pogačar (30/39)	(Mexico) del Toro (3/4)
(Switzerland) Tour de Suisse	(United Kingdom) A Yates (6/6)	(Portugal) Almeida (4/4)	(Slovenia) Pogačar (38/39)
(Denmark) Copenhagen Sprint	Not on calendar	(Belgium) Meeus	(Belgium) Philipsen (6/7)
Tour de France	(Slovenia) Pogačar (22/38)	(Slovenia) Pogačar (31/39)	(Slovenia) Pogačar (39/39)
(Spain) Clásica San Sebastián	(Switzerland) Hirschi (2/3)	(Italy) Ciccone	(Belgium) Evenepoel (10/11)
(Poland) Tour de Pologne	(Denmark) Vingegaard (6/10)	(United States) McNulty (1/2)	(Germany) Brenner
(Germany) Hamburg Cyclassics	(Netherlands) Kooij	(Republic of Ireland) Townsend	(France) Magnier
(Belgium) (Netherlands) Benelux Tour	(Belgium) Wellens (7/7)	(Belgium) De Lie (2/3)	(Belgium) Philipsen (7/7)
Bretagne Classic-Ouest-France	(Switzerland) Hirschi (3/3)	(Belgium) De Lie (3/3)	(Spain) Aranburu
(Spain) Vuelta a España	(Slovenia) Roglič (17/18)	(Denmark) Vingegaard (7/10)	(Spain) Mas (2/2)
(Canada) Grand Prix Cycliste de Québec	(Australia) Matthews (5/6)	(France) Alaphilippe (7/7)	(Belgium) Evenepoel (11/11)
(Canada) Grand Prix Cycliste de Montréal	(Slovenia) Pogačar (23/39)	(United States) McNulty (2/2)	(Mexico) del Toro (4/4)
(Italy) Il Lombardia	(Slovenia) Pogačar (24/39)	(Slovenia) Pogačar (32/39)	(France) Seixas (3/3)
(China) Tour of Guangxi	(Belgium) Van Eetvelt (2/2)	(United Kingdom) Double	(Belgium) Widar

== Wins by cyclist ==
Riders in bold are still active.

Rank	Cyclist	Total	Grand Tour	Monument	Stage-race	One-day	Years	Ref.
1	(Slovenia) **Tadej Pogačar**	39	6	13	11	9	2019–2026	
2	(Slovenia) **Primož Roglič**	18	5	1	12	0	2018–2025	
3	(Netherlands) **Mathieu van der Poel**	17	0	8	1	8	2019–2026	
4	(Spain) Alejandro Valverde (Note: Valverde also won two monuments (2006 Liège–Bastogne–Liège and 2008 Liège–Bastogne–Liège) and 2006 La Flèche Wallonne prior to the creation of the UCI World Tour)	14	1	2	6	5	2009–2018	
5	(Belgium) Philippe Gilbert (Note: Gilbert also won 2006 Omloop Het Volk and 2008 Omloop Het Volk prior to the creation of the UCI World Tour)	13	0	5	1	7	2009–2019	
6	(United Kingdom) Chris Froome	12	7	0	5	0	2011–2018	
7	(Belgium) **Remco Evenepoel**	11	1	2	2	6	2019–2026	
8	(Slovakia) Peter Sagan	10	0	2	1	7	2011–2018	
8	(Denmark) **Jonas Vingegaard**	10	4	0	6	0	2022–2026	
10	(Spain) Alberto Contador (Note: Contador also won three Grand Tours (2007 Tour de France, 2008 Giro d'Italia and 2008 Vuelta a España), 2007 Paris–Nice and the 2008 Tour of the Basque Country prior to the creation of the UCI World Tour)	9	4	0	5	0	2009–2016	
10	(Australia) Simon Gerrans (Note: Gerrans also won the 2006 Tour Down Under prior to the creation of the UCI World Tour)	9	0	2	3	4	2009–2016	
10	(Italy) Vincenzo Nibali (Note: Nibali also won 2006 GP Ouest-France prior to the creation of the UCI World Tour)	9	4	3	2	0	2010–2018	
10	(Belgium) **Wout van Aert**	9	0	2	0	7	2020–2026	
14	(Norway) Alexander Kristoff	8	0	2	0	6	2014–2019	
14	(Poland) **Michał Kwiatkowski**	8	0	1	2	5	2015–2022	
14	(Australia) Richie Porte	8	0	0	8	0	2013–2021	
17	(France) **Julian Alaphilippe**	7	0	1	0	6	2018–2025	
17	(Switzerland) Fabian Cancellara (Note: Cancellara also won two monuments (2006 Paris–Roubaix and 2008 Milan–San Remo), 2008 Tirreno–Adriatico and 2008 Monte Paschi Eroica prior to the creation of the UCI World Tour)	7	0	5	1	1	2009–2014	
17	(Belgium) **Jasper Philipsen**	7	0	1	1	5	2021–2026	
17	(Colombia) **Nairo Quintana**	7	2	0	5	0	2013–2017	
17	(Belgium) Greg Van Avermaet	7	0	1	1	5	2016–2019	
17	(Belgium) **Tim Wellens**	7	0	0	6	1	2014–2024	

== Wins by country ==
Rank	Nation	Wins	Riders
1.	Belgium	85	Gilbert (13), Evenepoel (11), van Aert (9), Philipsen (7), Van Avermaet (7), Wellens (7), Boonen (6), De Lie (3), Lampaert (3), Naesen (2), Stuyven (2), Teuns (2), Van Eetvelt (2), Benoot, De Plus, Devenyns, Devolder, Meeus, Merlier, Nuyens, Van Gils, Vanmarcke, Vansummeren, Widar
2.	Slovenia	55	Pogačar (39), Roglič (18), Mohorič (3), Špilak (3), Bole, Brajkovič, Tratnik
3.	Spain	47	Valverde (14), Contador (9), J Rodríguez (6), LL Sánchez (3), Ayuso (2), Izagirre (2), Mas (2), Aranburu, Barredo, Freire, Intxausti, Moreno, Prades, C Rodríguez, S Sánchez, Soler
4.	Great Britain	40	Froome (12), Thomas (6), A Yates (6), Wiggins (5), S Yates (3), Pidcock (2), Williams (2), Cavendish, Double, Geoghegan Hart, Hayter
5.	Australia	38	Gerrans (9), Porte (8), Matthews (6), Evans (4), Goss (2), Vine (2), Davis, Dennis, Ewan, Hayman, Hindley, McCarthy, Meyer
5.	Netherlands	38	van der Poel (17), Terpstra (4), van Baarle (3), Dumoulin (2), Gesink (2), Groenewegen (2), Mollema (2), Boom, Kooij, Poels, Slagter, Vader, Weening
7.	Italy	37	Nibali (9), Viviani (6), Scarponi (3), Colbrelli (2), Gasparotto (2), Ulissi (2), Aru, Ballan, Ballerini, Basso, Bettiol, Ciccone, Ganna, Garzelli, Moscon, Moser, Paolini, Pozzato, Rebellin
8.	Denmark	26	Vingegaard (10), Fuglsang (4), Pedersen (4), Asgreen (2), Skjelmose (2), Valgren (2), Andresen, Kragh Andersen
9.	Colombia	22	Quintana (7), Bernal (5), López (2), Martínez (2), Betancur, Chaves, Henao, Higuita, Molano, Urán
9.	France	22	Alaphilippe (7), Seixas (3), Cosnefroy (2), Démare (2), Laporte (2), Chavanel, Gallopin, Madouas, Magnier, Pinot, Voeckler
11.	Germany	20	Degenkolb (4), T Martin (4), Ackermann (2), Greipel (2), Schachmann (2), Arndt, Brenner, Ciolek, Klöden, Mayrhofer, Zimmermann
12.	Norway	15	Kristoff (8), Boasson Hagen (5), Nordhaug, Wærenskjold
13.	United States	14	Jorgenson (3), Farrar (2), Horner (2), McNulty (2), Powless (2), Kuss, Leipheimer, Talansky
14.	Switzerland	13	Cancellara (7), Hirschi (3), Albasini, Schmid, Zaugg
15.	Slovakia	10	Sagan (10)
16.	Poland	9	Kwiatkowski (8), Majka
16.	Portugal	9	Costa (5), Almeida (4)
18.	Ireland	7	D Martin (4), S Bennett (2), Townsend
19.	Czech Republic	5	Štybar (3), Kreuziger (2)
20.	Luxembourg	4	A Schleck (2), Jungels, F Schleck
20.	Mexico	4	del Toro (4)
20.	Russia	4	Ivanov, Menchov, Sivakov, Zakarin
23.	Austria	3	Eisel, Großschartner, Haller
23.	Ecuador	3	Carapaz (2), Narváez
25.	Kazakhstan	2	Iglinsky, Vinokourov
25.	New Zealand	2	G Bennett, Pithie
25.	South Africa	2	Impey (2)
28.	Canada	1	Hesjedal
28.	Eritrea	1	Girmay

== Wins by team ==
Teams in italics are no longer active.

Rank	Team	Wins	Riders
1.	UAE Team Emirates XRG	73	Pogačar (39), del Toro (4), Almeida (3), A Yates (3), Ayuso (2), Costa (2), Hirschi (2), Kristoff (2), McNulty (2), Scarponi (2), Ulissi (2), Vine (2), Wellens (2), Ballan, Bole, Molano, Narváez, Pozzato, Špilak
2.	Netcompany–Ineos	60	Froome (12), Kwiatkowski (7), Thomas (6), Bernal (5), Wiggins (5), Porte (4), Boasson Hagen (3), Pidcock (2), van Baarle (2), Viviani (2), Carapaz, Ganna, Geoghegan Hart, Hayter, Henao, Martínez, Moscon, Nordhaug, Poels, C Rodríguez, Sivakov, A Yates
3.	Visma–Lease a Bike	55	Roglič (15), Vingegaard (10), van Aert (9), Jorgenson (3), Gesink (2), Laporte (2), G Bennett, Boom, De Plus, Freire, Groenewegen, Kooij, Kuss, Menchov, LL Sánchez, Slagter, Tratnik, Vader, van Baarle, S Yates
4.	Soudal–Quick-Step	51	Evenepoel (8), Alaphilippe (6), Boonen (6), Terpstra (4), Viviani (4), Gilbert (3), Lampaert (3), Štybar (3), Asgreen (2), Almeida, Ballerini, S Bennett, Davis, Devenyns, Devolder, Jungels, Kwiatkowski, Magnier, T Martin, Mas, Urán
5.	Movistar Team	31	Valverde (14), Quintana (7), Costa (3), LL Sánchez (2), Carapaz, Intxausti, Izagirre, Mas, Soler
6.	Alpecin–Premier Tech	26	van der Poel (17), Philipsen (7), Kragh Andersen, Merlier
7.	Team Jayco–AlUla	23	Gerrans (8), Impey (2), Matthews (2), A Yates (2), S Yates (2), Albasini, Chaves, Double, Ewan, Hayman, Schmid, Weening
7.	Lotto–Intermarché	23	Gilbert (8), Wellens (5), De Lie (3), Van Eetvelt (2), Benoot, Greipel, Van Gils, Widar, Zimmermann
9.	XDS Astana Team	21	Nibali (5), Fuglsang (4), Contador (3), López (2), Valgren (2), Aru, Gasparotto, Iglinsky, Izagirre, Vinokourov
9.	Red Bull–Bora–Hansgrohe	21	Evenepoel (3), Roglič (3), Sagan (3), Ackermann (2), Schachmann (2), S Bennett, Großschartner, Haller, Higuita, Hindley, McCarthy, Meeus, Vlasov
11.	Lidl–Trek	19	Cancellara (4), Pedersen (4), Mollema (2), Skjelmose (2), Stuyven (2), Ciccone, Gallopin, Horner, Porte, Zaugg
12.	CCC Pro Team	18	Van Avermaet (7), Evans (4), Porte (3), Gilbert (2), Dennis, Teuns
12.	Team Katusha–Alpecin	18	Kristoff (6), J Rodríguez (6), Špilak (2), Ivanov, Moreno, Paolini, Zakarin
12.	Tinkoff	18	Contador (6), Cancellara (3), Sagan (3), A Schleck (2), Kreuziger, Majka, Nuyens, F Schleck
15.	EF Education–EasyPost	15	D Martin (4), Farrar (2), Powless (2), Bettiol, Hesjedal, Martínez, Meyer, Talansky, Vanmarcke, Vansummeren
16.	Team Picnic–PostNL	13	Degenkolb (4), Matthews (4), Dumoulin (2), Arndt, Hirschi, Mayrhofer
17.	HTC–Highroad	10	T Martin (3), Boasson Hagen (2), Goss (2), Cavendish, Eisel, Greipel
18.	Liquigas	9	Sagan (4), Nibali (2), Basso, Kreuziger, Moser
19.	Team Bahrain Victorious	8	Mohorič (3), Colbrelli (2), Nibali (2), Teuns
19.	Decathlon CMA CGM Team	8	Seixas (3), Cosnefroy (2), Andresen, Betancur, Naesen
21.	Groupama–FDJ United	5	Démare (2), Madouas, Pinot, Pithie
22.	Team RadioShack	4	Brajkovič, Horner, Klöden, Leipheimer
23.	Intermarché–Wanty	2	Gasparotto, Girmay
23.	NSN Cycling Team	2	Williams (2)
23.	GW Erco SportFitness	2	Rebellin, Scarponi
23.	IAM Cycling	2	Chavanel, Naesen
23.	Tudor Pro Cycling Team	2	Alaphilippe, Brenner
28.	Team TotalEnergies	1	Voeckler
28.	Cofidis	1	Aranburu
28.	Uno-X Mobility	1	Wærenskjold
28.	Acqua & Sapone	1	Garzelli
28.	Cervélo TestTeam	1	Gerrans
28.	Euskadi–Murias	1	Prades
28.	Euskaltel–Euskadi	1	S Sánchez
28.	Pinarello–Q36.5 Pro Cycling Team	1	Townsend
28.	Team Qhubeka NextHash	1	Ciolek
28.	Unibet Rose Rockets	1	Groenewegen

== UCI WorldTeams ==
=== Current UCI WorldTeams (2026 season) ===
Team	Country	Seasons in World Tour	No. of seasons	Previous team names
Decathlon CMA CGM Team	France	2009–2026	18	AG2R La Mondiale (2009–2020), AG2R Citroën Team (2021–2023), Decathlon–AG2R La Mondiale (2024–2025)
EF Education–EasyPost	United States	2009–2026	18	Garmin–Slipstream (2009), Garmin–Transitions (2010), Garmin–Cervélo (2011), Garmin–Barracuda (2012), Garmin–Sharp (2012–2014), Cannondale–Garmin (2015), Cannondale (2016), Cannondale–Drapac (2016–2017), EF Education First–Drapac p/b Cannondale (2018), EF Education First (2019), EF Pro Cycling (2020), EF Education–Nippo (2021)
Movistar Team	Spain	2009–2026	18	Caisse d'Epargne (2009–2010)
Soudal–Quick-Step	Belgium	2009–2026	18	Quick-Step (2009–2011), Omega Pharma–Quick-Step (2012–2014), Etixx–Quick-Step (2015–2016), Quick-Step Floors (2017–2018), Deceuninck–Quick-Step (2019–2021), Quick-Step Alpha Vinyl Team (2022)
UAE Team Emirates XRG	Italy (2009–2016); United Arab Emirates (2017–2026)	2009–2026	18	Lampre–NGC (2009), Lampre–Farnese Vini (2010), Lampre–Farnese (2010), Lampre–ISD (2011–2012), Lampre–Merida (2013–2016), UAE Abu Dhabi (2017), UAE Team Emirates (2017-2024)
Visma–Lease a Bike	Netherlands	2009–2026	18	Rabobank (2009–2012), Blanco Pro Cycling (2013), Belkin Pro Cycling (2013–2014), LottoNL–Jumbo (2015–2018), Team Jumbo–Visma (2019–2023)
XDS Astana Team	Kazakhstan	2009–2026	18	Astana (2009–2020), Astana–Premier Tech (2021), Astana Qazaqstan Team (2022-2024)
Groupama–FDJ United	France	2009–2010, 2012–2026	17	Française des Jeux (2009–2010), FDJ (2010, 2013, 2015–2018), FDJ–BigMat (2012), FDJ.fr (2013–2014), Groupama–FDJ (2018–2025)
Netcompany–Ineos	Great Britain	2010–2026	17	Team Sky (2010–2019), Team INEOS (2019–2020)
Lidl–Trek	Luxembourg (2011–2013); United States (2014–2025); Germany (2026)	2011–2026	16	Leopard Trek (2011), RadioShack–Nissan (2012), RadioShack–Leopard (2013), Trek Factory Racing (2014–2015), Trek–Segafredo (2016–2023)
Lotto–Intermarché	Belgium	2009–2022, 2026	15	Silence–Lotto (2009), Omega Pharma–Lotto (2010–2011), Lotto–Belisol (2012–2014), Lotto–Soudal (2015–2022)
Team Jayco–AlUla	Australia	2012–2026	15	GreenEDGE (2012), Orica–GreenEDGE (2012–2016), Orica–BikeExchange (2016), Orica–Scott (2017), Mitchelton–Scott (2018–2020), Team BikeExchange (2021), Team BikeExchange–Jayco (2022)
Team Picnic–PostNL	Netherlands (2013–2014, 2022–2026); Germany (2015–2021)	2013–2026	14	Argos–Shimano (2013), Giant–Shimano (2014), Team Giant–Alpecin (2015–2016), Team Sunweb (2017–2020), Team DSM (2021–2023), Team dsm–firmenich (2023), Team dsm–firmenich PostNL (2024)
Team Bahrain Victorious	Bahrain	2017–2026	10	Bahrain–Merida (2017–2019), Bahrain–McLaren (2020)
Red Bull–Bora–Hansgrohe	Germany	2017–2026	10	Bora–Hansgrohe (2017–2024)
Alpecin–Premier Tech	Belgium	2023–2026	4	Alpecin–Deceuninck (2023–2025)
NSN Cycling Team	Israel (2020-2022); Switzerland (2026)	2020–2022, 2026	4	Israel Start-Up Nation (2020–2021), Israel–Premier Tech (2022)
Uno-X Mobility	Norway	2026	1	

=== Previous UCI WorldTeams ===
Teams in italics are no longer active.

Team	Country	Seasons in World Tour	No. of seasons	Previous team names
Team Katusha–Alpecin	Russia (2009–2016); Switzerland (2017–2019)	2009–2019	11	Team Katusha (2009–2016)
CCC Team	United States (2011–2018); Poland (2019–2020)	2011–2020	10	BMC Racing Team (2011–2018)
Tinkoff	Denmark (2009–2013); Russia (2014–2016)	2009–2016	8	Team Saxo Bank (2009–2010, 2012), Saxo Bank–SunGard (2011), Saxo Bank–Tinkoff Bank (2012), Saxo–Tinkoff (2013), Tinkoff–Saxo (2014–2015)
Cofidis	France	2009, 2020–2025	7	
Team Qhubeka NextHash	South Africa	2016–2021	6	Team Dimension Data (2016–2019), NTT Pro Cycling (2020), Team Qhubeka Assos (2021)
Cannondale	Italy	2009–2014	6	Liquigas (2009), Liquigas–Doimo (2009–2010), Liquigas–Cannondale (2011–2012)
Euskaltel–Euskadi	Spain	2009–2013	5	
Intermarché–Wanty	Belgium	2021–2025	5	Intermarché–Wanty–Gobert Matériaux (2021–2022), Intermarché–Circus–Wanty (2023)
HTC–Highroad	United States	2009–2011	3	Team Columbia–High Road (2009), Team Columbia–HTC (2009), Team HTC–Columbia (2010)
Vacansoleil–DCM	Netherlands	2011–2013	3	
Arkéa–B&B Hotels	France	2023–2025	3	Arkéa–Samsic (2023)
Footon–Servetto–Fuji	Spain	2009–2010	2	Fuji–Servetto (2009)
IAM Cycling	Switzerland	2015–2016	2	
Team Europcar	France	2009, 2014	2	Bbox Bouygues Telecom (2009)
Team Milram	Germany	2009–2010	2	
Team RadioShack	United States	2010–2011	2	

== See also ==
- UCI race classifications
