= RCS Sport =

Sports & media company

RCS Sport is a sports & media company part of RCS Group (controlled by Cairo Communications) that specialises in organising and marketing sporting events. RCS organises the Giro d'Italia and other cycling races, as well as other sporting events such as the Milano Marathon. It is the second biggest organiser of cycling events behind Amaury Sport Organisation.

== History ==
La Gazzetta dello Sport, an Italian sports newspaper was founded in 1896, and began organising the Giro d'Italia cycling race in 1909. In March 1989, RCS Sport was founded with the aim of organising the cycling events run by La Gazzetta dello Sport.

In 2013, in cooperation with the Dubai Sports Council, RCS Sport and Events DMCC, a subsidiary branch of RCS Sport based in Dubai, was established. 2014 saw the foundation of RCS Active Team, a company specialising in the organisation of mass participation sporting events. In 2019, RCS Sports & Events was created, a branch that joined RCS Sport in the management of sports events.

== Cycling ==
RCS Sport owns and runs 6 UCI World Tour events:

- Giro d'Italia
- UAE Tour
- Strade Bianche
- Tirreno–Adriatico
- Milano-Sanremo
- Il Lombardia

It also own two UCI ProSeries events:

- Milano–Torino
- GranPiemonte

Three UCI Europe Tour events:

- Giro d'Abruzzo
- Giro di Sicilia
- Giro Next Gen

Four UCI Women's World Tour events:

- UAE Tour Women
- Strade Bianche Donne
- Giro d'Italia Women
- Milan–San Remo Women

== Mass events ==
RCS Sport organises mass participation sporting events. This category includes the Milano Marathon, the Abu Dhabi Marathon, the Roma-Ostia Half Marathon the Rome Half Marathon, and two Gran Fondo (Gran Fondo Strade Bianche and Gran Fondo Il Lombardia "Felice Gimondi").

== Other events ==
RCS Sport is advisor to Pallacanestro Olimpia Milano.
