= 2019 Team Ineos season =

Team INEOS
- UCI code: INS
- Status: UCI WorldTeam
- World Tour Rank: 4th
- Manager: Dave Brailsford
- Main sponsor(s): Ineos
- Based: National Cycling Centre; Manchester; England
- Bicycles: Pinarello
- Groupset: Shimano

Season victories
- One-day races: 1
- Stage race overall: 8
- Stage race stages: 14
- Grand Tours: 1
- National Championships: 3
- Most wins: Egan Bernal, (5 Wins)
- Best ranked rider: Egan Bernal, (5th)

The 2019 cycling season began in Australia at the Tour Down Under for Team Sky in January.

As a UCI WorldTeam, they are automatically invited and obliged to send a squad to every event in the UCI World Tour.

Effective 1 May 2019 the team became known as Team Ineos.

== 2019 roster ==
As of 1 January 2019.

| Rider | Date of birth |
|---|---|
| Leonardo Basso (ITA) | 25 December 1993 (aged 25) |
| Egan Bernal (COL) | 13 January 1997 (aged 21) |
| Jonathan Castroviejo (ESP) | 27 April 1987 (aged 31) |
| David de la Cruz (ESP) | 6 May 1989 (aged 29) |
| Owain Doull (GBR) | 2 May 1993 (aged 25) |
| Eddie Dunbar (IRL) | 1 September 1996 (aged 22) |
| Kenny Elissonde (FRA) | 22 July 1991 (aged 27) |
| Chris Froome (GBR) | 20 May 1985 (aged 33) |
| Filippo Ganna (ITA) | 25 July 1996 (aged 22) |
| Tao Geoghegan Hart (GBR) | 30 March 1995 (aged 23) |
| Michał Gołaś (POL) | 29 April 1984 (aged 34) |
| Kristoffer Halvorsen (NOR) | 13 April 1996 (aged 22) |
| Sebastián Henao (COL) | 5 August 1993 (aged 25) |
| Vasil Kiryienka (BLR) | 28 June 1981 (aged 37) |
| Christian Knees (GER) | 5 March 1981 (aged 37) |

| Rider | Date of birth |
|---|---|
| Michał Kwiatkowski (POL) | 2 June 1990 (aged 28) |
| Chris Lawless (GBR) | 4 November 1995 (aged 23) |
| Gianni Moscon (ITA) | 20 April 1994 (aged 24) |
| Jhonatan Narváez (ECU) | 4 March 1997 (aged 21) |
| Wout Poels (NED) | 1 October 1987 (aged 31) |
| Salvatore Puccio (ITA) | 31 August 1989 (aged 29) |
| Diego Rosa (ITA) | 27 March 1989 (aged 29) |
| Luke Rowe (GBR) | 10 March 1990 (aged 28) |
| Pavel Sivakov (RUS) | 11 July 1997 (aged 21) |
| Iván Sosa (COL) | 31 October 1997 (aged 21) |
| Ian Stannard (GBR) | 25 May 1987 (aged 31) |
| Ben Swift (GBR) | 5 November 1987 (aged 31) |
| Geraint Thomas (GBR) | 25 May 1986 (aged 32) |
| Dylan van Baarle (NED) | 21 May 1992 (aged 26) |

Riders who joined the team for the 2019 season

| Rider | 2018 team |
|---|---|
| Filippo Ganna | UAE Team Emirates |
| Jhonatan Narváez | Quick-Step Floors |
| Iván Sosa | Androni Giocattoli–Sidermec |
| Ben Swift | UAE Team Emirates |

Riders who left the team during or after the 2018 season

| Rider | 2019 team |
|---|---|
| Philip Deignan | Retired |
| Jonathan Dibben | Madison Genesis |
| Sergio Henao | UAE Team Emirates |
| Beñat Intxausti | Euskadi–Murias |
| David López | Retired |
| Łukasz Wiśniowski | CCC Team |

== Season victories ==
| Date | Race | Competition | Rider | Country | Location |
|---|---|---|---|---|---|
| 1 February | Herald Sun Tour, Stage 3 | UCI Oceania Tour | Owain Doull (GBR) | Australia | Warragul |
| 3 February | Herald Sun Tour, Stage 5 | UCI Oceania Tour | Kristoffer Halvorsen (NOR) | Australia | Melbourne |
| 3 February | Herald Sun Tour, Overall | UCI Oceania Tour | Dylan van Baarle (NED) | Australia | |
| 3 February | Herald Sun Tour, Mountains classification | UCI Oceania Tour | Christian Knees (GER) | Australia | |
| 3 February | Herald Sun Tour, Youth classification | UCI Oceania Tour | Pavel Sivakov (RUS) | Australia | |
| 3 February | Herald Sun Tour, Team classification | UCI Oceania Tour | (Note: The riders on the squad were Owain Doull, Kenny Elissonde, Kristoffer Halvorsen, Christian Knees, Luke Rowe, Pavel Sivakov and Dylan van Baarle) | Australia | |
| 14 February | Tour La Provence, Stage 1 | UCI Europe Tour | Filippo Ganna (ITA) | France | Saintes-Maries-de-la-Mer |
| 17 February | Tour Colombia, Mountains classification | UCI America Tour | Iván Sosa (COL) | Colombia | |
| 24 February | Volta ao Algarve, Team classification | UCI Europe Tour | (Note: The riders on the squad were David de la Cruz, Eddie Dunbar, Tao Geoghegan Hart, Wout Poels, Ian Stannard and Dylan van Baarle) | Portugal | |
| 17 March | Paris–Nice, Overall | UCI World Tour | Egan Bernal (COL) | France | |
| 17 March | Paris–Nice, Points classification | UCI World Tour | Michał Kwiatkowski (POL) | France | |
| 17 March | Paris–Nice, Young Rider classification | UCI World Tour | Egan Bernal (COL) | France | |
| 17 March | Paris–Nice, Team classification | UCI World Tour | (Note: The riders on the squad were Egan Bernal, Tao Geoghegan Hart, Sebastián Henao, Michał Kwiatkowski, Jhonatan Narváez, Luke Rowe and Iván Sosa) | France | |
| 22 April | Tour of the Alps, Stage 1 | UCI Europe Tour | Tao Geoghegan Hart (GBR) | Austria | Kufstein |
| 23 April | Tour of the Alps, Stage 2 | UCI Europe Tour | Pavel Sivakov (RUS) | Italy | Schenna |
| 25 April | Tour of the Alps, Stage 4 | UCI Europe Tour | Tao Geoghegan Hart (GBR) | Italy | Cles |
| 26 April | Tour of the Alps, Overall | UCI Europe Tour | Pavel Sivakov (RUS) | Austria; Italy | |
| 26 April | Tour of the Alps, Youth classification | UCI Europe Tour | Pavel Sivakov (RUS) | Austria; Italy | |
| 26 April | Tour of the Alps, Team classification | UCI Europe Tour | (Note: The riders on the squad were Leonardo Basso, Kenny Elissonde, Chris Froome, Tao Geoghegan Hart, Salvatore Puccio and Pavel Sivakov) | Austria; Italy | |
| 5 May | Tour de Yorkshire, Overall | UCI Europe Tour | Chris Lawless (GBR) | United Kingdom | |
| 5 May | Tour de Yorkshire, Points classification | UCI Europe Tour | Chris Lawless (GBR) | United Kingdom | |
| 5 May | Tour de Yorkshire, Team classification | UCI Europe Tour | (Note: The riders on the squad were Leonardo Basso, Owain Doull, Eddie Dunbar, Chris Froome, Michał Gołaś, Chris Lawless and Ian Stannard) | United Kingdom | |
| 2 June | Tour of Norway, Stage 6 | UCI Europe Tour | Kristoffer Halvorsen (NOR) | Norway | Hønefoss |
| 2 June | Tour of Norway, Youth classification | UCI Europe Tour | Kristoffer Halvorsen (NOR) | Norway | |
| 15 June | Critérium du Dauphiné, Stage 7 | UCI World Tour | Wout Poels (NED) | France | Les Sept Laux-Pipay |
| 16 June | Critérium du Dauphiné, Stage 8 | UCI World Tour | Dylan van Baarle (NED) | Switzerland | Champéry |
| 21 June | Tour de Suisse, Stage 7 | UCI World Tour | Egan Bernal (COL) | Switzerland | San Gottardo |
| 22 June | Route d'Occitanie, Stage 3 | UCI Europe Tour | Iván Sosa (COL) | France | Luchon – Hospice de France |
| 23 June | Tour de Suisse, Overall | UCI World Tour | Egan Bernal (COL) | Switzerland | |
| 23 June | Tour de Suisse, Youth classification | UCI World Tour | Egan Bernal (COL) | Switzerland | |
| 23 June | Route d'Occitanie, Youth classification | UCI Europe Tour | Iván Sosa (COL) | France | |
| 28 July | Tour de France, Overall | UCI World Tour | Egan Bernal (COL) | France | |
| 28 July | Tour de France, Youth classification | UCI World Tour | Egan Bernal (COL) | France | |
| 31 July | Tour de Wallonie, Youth classification | UCI Europe Tour | Chris Lawless (GBR) | Belgium | |
| 31 July | Tour de Wallonie, Team classification | UCI Europe Tour | (Note: The riders on the squad were David de la Cruz, Eddie Dunbar, Filippo Ganna, Kristoffer Halvorsen, Christian Knees, Chris Lawless and Diego Rosa.) | Belgium | |
| 9 August | Tour de Pologne, Overall | UCI World Tour | Pavel Sivakov (RUS) | Poland | |
| 9 August | Tour de Pologne, Team classification | UCI World Tour | (Note: The riders on the squad were Owain Doull, Tao Geoghegan Hart, Michał Gołaś, Vasil Kiryienka, Salvatore Puccio, Pavel Sivakov and Ben Swift.) | Poland | |
| 15 August | Vuelta a Burgos, Stage 3 | UCI Europe Tour | Iván Sosa (COL) | Spain | Picón Blanco |
| 17 August | Vuelta a Burgos, Stage 5 | UCI Europe Tour | Iván Sosa (COL) | Spain | Lagunas de Neila |
| 17 August | Vuelta a Burgos, Overall | UCI Europe Tour | Iván Sosa (COL) | Spain | |
| 17 August | Vuelta a Burgos, Mountains classification | UCI Europe Tour | Iván Sosa (COL) | Spain | |
| 17 August | Vuelta a Burgos, Youth classification | UCI Europe Tour | Iván Sosa (COL) | Spain | |
| 17 August | Vuelta a Burgos, Team classification | UCI Europe Tour | (Note: The riders on the squad were David de la Cruz, Kenny Elissonde, Sebastián Henao, Vasil Kiryienka, Jhonatan Narváez, Iván Sosa and Ian Stannard.) | Spain | |
| 17 August | BinckBank Tour, Stage 6 | UCI World Tour | Filippo Ganna (ITA) | Netherlands | The Hague |
| 14 September | Tour of Britain, Team classification | UCI Europe Tour | (Note: The riders on the squad were Eddie Dunbar, Michał Gołaś, Gianni Moscon, Pavel Sivakov, Ben Swift and Dylan van Baarle.) | United Kingdom | |
| 10 October | Gran Piemonte | UCI Europe Tour | Egan Bernal (COL) | Italy | Oropa |

== National, Continental and World champions ==
| Date | Discipline | Jersey | Rider | Country | Location |
|---|---|---|---|---|---|
| 28 June | Italian National Time Trial Champion | | Filippo Ganna (ITA) | Italy | Bedonia |
| 28 June | Spanish National Time Trial Champion | | Jonathan Castroviejo (ESP) | Spain | Yecla |
| 29 June | British National Road Race Champion | | Ben Swift (GBR) | United Kingdom | Norwich |
