= 2020 Vuelta a Burgos =

2020 UCI Europe Tour 2020 UCI ProSeries

Race details
- Dates: 28 July – 1 August 2020
- Stages: 5
- Distance: 797 km (495.2 mi)
- Winning time: 19h 14' 42"

Results
| Jersey awarded to the overall winner | Winner | Remco Evenepoel (BEL) | (Deceuninck–Quick-Step) |
| | Second | Mikel Landa (ESP) | (Bahrain–McLaren) |
| | Third | João Almeida (POR) | (Deceuninck–Quick-Step) |
| Jersey awarded to the points classification winner | Points | Mikel Landa (ESP) | (Bahrain–McLaren) |
| Jersey awarded to the mountains classification winner | Mountains | Gotzon Martín (ESP) | (Euskaltel–Euskadi) |
| Jersey awarded to the youth classification winner | Youth | Remco Evenepoel (BEL) | (Deceuninck–Quick-Step) |
| | Team | Mitchelton–Scott | |

The 2020 Vuelta a Burgos was a men's road bicycle race which took place from 28 July to 1 August 2020 in the Spanish province of Burgos. It was the 42nd edition of the Vuelta a Burgos stage race, which was established in 1946. The race was rated as a 2.Pro event and formed part of the 2020 UCI Europe Tour and the 2020 UCI ProSeries. The race was made up of five stages.

== Teams ==
Twenty-three teams participated in the race, including 14 of the 19 UCI WorldTeams, six UCI Professional Continental teams, and three UCI Continental teams. Each team entered seven riders except for Israel Start-Up Nation, which entered only six, for a starting peloton of 153 riders. 127 riders finished the race.

UCI WorldTeams

- Astana
- Bahrain–McLaren
- Bora–Hansgrohe
- CCC Team
- Deceuninck–Quick-Step
- Groupama–FDJ
- Israel Start-Up Nation
- Mitchelton–Scott
- Movistar Team
- NTT Pro Cycling
- Team Ineos
- Team Jumbo–Visma
- Trek–Segafredo
- UAE Team Emirates

UCI Professional Continental Teams

- Arkéa–Samsic
- Bingoal–Wallonie Bruxelles
- Burgos BH
- Caja Rural–Seguros RGA
- Gazprom–RusVelo
- Nippo–Delko–One Provence

UCI Continental Teams

- Equipo Kern Pharma
- Euskaltel–Euskadi
- Kometa Xstra Cycling Team

== Route ==
Stage characteristics and winners
| Stage | Date | Course | Distance | Type | Stage winner |
|---|---|---|---|---|---|
| 1 | 28 July | Burgos to Mirador del Castillo | 157 km (98 mi) | Hilly stage | Felix Großschartner (AUT) |
| 2 | 29 July | Castrojeriz to Villadiego | 168 km (104 mi) | Flat stage | Fernando Gaviria (COL) |
| 3 | 30 July | Sargentes de La Lora to Picón Blanco (Espinosa de los Monteros) | 150 km (93 mi) | Mountain stage | Remco Evenepoel (BEL) |
| 4 | 31 July | Gumiel de Izán to Roa de Duero | 164 km (102 mi) | Hilly stage | Sam Bennett (IRL) |
| 5 | 1 August | Covarrubias to Lagunas de Neila | 158 km (98 mi) | Mountain stage | Iván Sosa (COL) |
| Total | | 797 km (495 mi) | | | |

== Stages ==
=== Stage 1 ===
28 July 2020 – Burgos to Mirador del Castillo, 157 km (98 mi)

Stage 1 Result
| Rank | Rider | Team | Time |
|---|---|---|---|
| 1 | Felix Großschartner (AUT) | Bora–Hansgrohe | 3h 40' 21" |
| 2 | João Almeida (POR) | Deceuninck–Quick-Step | + 8" |
| 3 | Alejandro Valverde (ESP) | Movistar Team | + 8" |
| 4 | Alex Aranburu (ESP) | Astana | + 8" |
| 5 | Mikel Landa (ESP) | Bahrain–McLaren | + 8" |
| 6 | David Gaudu (FRA) | Groupama–FDJ | + 8" |
| 7 | Jon Aberasturi (ESP) | Caja Rural–Seguros RGA | + 8" |
| 8 | Jay McCarthy (AUS) | Bora–Hansgrohe | + 8" |
| 9 | Matteo Trentin (ITA) | CCC Team | + 8" |
| 10 | Remco Evenepoel (BEL) | Deceuninck–Quick-Step | + 8" |

General classification after Stage 1
| Rank | Rider | Team | Time |
|---|---|---|---|
| 1 | Felix Großschartner (AUT) | Bora–Hansgrohe | 3h 40' 21" |
| 2 | João Almeida (POR) | Deceuninck–Quick-Step | + 8" |
| 3 | Alejandro Valverde (ESP) | Movistar Team | + 8" |
| 4 | Alex Aranburu (ESP) | Astana | + 8" |
| 5 | Mikel Landa (ESP) | Bahrain–McLaren | + 8" |
| 6 | David Gaudu (FRA) | Groupama–FDJ | + 8" |
| 7 | Jon Aberasturi (ESP) | Caja Rural–Seguros RGA | + 8" |
| 8 | Jay McCarthy (AUS) | Bora–Hansgrohe | + 8" |
| 9 | Matteo Trentin (ITA) | CCC Team | + 8" |
| 10 | Remco Evenepoel (BEL) | Deceuninck–Quick-Step | + 8" |

=== Stage 2 ===
29 July 2020 – Castrojeriz to Villadiego, 168 km (104 mi)

Stage 2 Result
| Rank | Rider | Team | Time |
|---|---|---|---|
| 1 | Fernando Gaviria (COL) | UAE Team Emirates | 3h 55' 38" |
| 2 | Arnaud Démare (FRA) | Groupama–FDJ | + 0" |
| 3 | Sam Bennett (IRL) | Deceuninck–Quick-Step | + 0" |
| 4 | Matteo Trentin (ITA) | CCC Team | + 0" |
| 5 | Jon Aberasturi (ESP) | Caja Rural–Seguros RGA | + 0" |
| 6 | Jasper Stuyven (BEL) | Trek–Segafredo | + 0" |
| 7 | Giacomo Nizzolo (ITA) | NTT Pro Cycling | + 0" |
| 8 | Edward Theuns (BEL) | Trek–Segafredo | + 0" |
| 9 | Pascal Eenkhoorn (NED) | Team Jumbo–Visma | + 0" |
| 10 | Mikel Aristi (ESP) | Euskaltel–Euskadi | + 0" |

General classification after Stage 2
| Rank | Rider | Team | Time |
|---|---|---|---|
| 1 | Felix Großschartner (AUT) | Bora–Hansgrohe | 7h 35' 59" |
| 2 | Jon Aberasturi (ESP) | Caja Rural–Seguros RGA | + 8" |
| 3 | Matteo Trentin (ITA) | CCC Team | + 8" |
| 4 | Jasper Stuyven (BEL) | Trek–Segafredo | + 8" |
| 5 | Giacomo Nizzolo (ITA) | NTT Pro Cycling | + 8" |
| 6 | Alejandro Valverde (ESP) | Movistar Team | + 8" |
| 7 | Mikel Landa (ESP) | Bahrain–McLaren | + 8" |
| 8 | George Bennett (NZL) | Team Jumbo–Visma | + 8" |
| 9 | Esteban Chaves (COL) | Mitchelton–Scott | + 8" |
| 10 | Richard Carapaz (ECU) | Team Ineos | + 8" |

=== Stage 3 ===
30 July 2020 – Sargentes de La Lora to Picón Blanco (Espinosa de los Monteros), 150 km (93 mi)

Stage 3 Result
| Rank | Rider | Team | Time |
|---|---|---|---|
| 1 | Remco Evenepoel (BEL) | Deceuninck–Quick-Step | 3h 59' 09" |
| 2 | George Bennett (NZL) | Team Jumbo–Visma | + 18" |
| 3 | Mikel Landa (ESP) | Bahrain–McLaren | + 32" |
| 4 | Esteban Chaves (COL) | Mitchelton–Scott | + 35" |
| 5 | João Almeida (POR) | Deceuninck–Quick-Step | + 45" |
| 6 | Ben Hermans (BEL) | Israel Start-Up Nation | + 52" |
| 7 | Richard Carapaz (ECU) | Team Ineos | + 52" |
| 8 | Fabio Aru (ITA) | UAE Team Emirates | + 1' 03" |
| 9 | Joel Nicolau (ESP) | Caja Rural–Seguros RGA | + 1' 20" |
| 10 | Mikel Nieve (ESP) | Mitchelton–Scott | + 1' 20" |

General classification after Stage 3
| Rank | Rider | Team | Time |
|---|---|---|---|
| 1 | Remco Evenepoel (BEL) | Deceuninck–Quick-Step | 11h 35' 16" |
| 2 | George Bennett (NZL) | Team Jumbo–Visma | + 18" |
| 3 | Mikel Landa (ESP) | Bahrain–McLaren | + 32" |
| 4 | Esteban Chaves (COL) | Mitchelton–Scott | + 35" |
| 5 | João Almeida (POR) | Deceuninck–Quick-Step | + 45" |
| 6 | Ben Hermans (BEL) | Israel Start-Up Nation | + 52" |
| 7 | Richard Carapaz (ECU) | Team Ineos | + 52" |
| 8 | Fabio Aru (ITA) | UAE Team Emirates | + 1' 03" |
| 9 | David de la Cruz (ESP) | UAE Team Emirates | + 1' 32" |
| 10 | Mikel Nieve (ESP) | Mitchelton–Scott | + 1' 35" |

=== Stage 4 ===
31 July 2020 – Gumiel de Izán to Roa de Duero, 164 km (102 mi)

Stage 4 Result
| Rank | Rider | Team | Time |
|---|---|---|---|
| 1 | Sam Bennett (IRL) | Deceuninck–Quick-Step | 3h 51' 19" |
| 2 | Arnaud Démare (FRA) | Groupama–FDJ | + 0" |
| 3 | Giacomo Nizzolo (ITA) | NTT Pro Cycling | + 0" |
| 4 | Davide Cimolai (ITA) | Israel Start-Up Nation | + 0" |
| 5 | Lionel Taminiaux (BEL) | Bingoal–Wallonie Bruxelles | + 0" |
| 6 | Biniam Girmay (ERI) | Nippo–Delko–One Provence | + 0" |
| 7 | Jon Aberasturi (ESP) | Caja Rural–Seguros RGA | + 0" |
| 8 | Martin Laas (EST) | Bora–Hansgrohe | + 0" |
| 9 | Alex Edmondson (AUS) | Mitchelton–Scott | + 0" |
| 10 | Rick Zabel (GER) | Israel Start-Up Nation | + 0" |

General classification after Stage 4
| Rank | Rider | Team | Time |
|---|---|---|---|
| 1 | Remco Evenepoel (BEL) | Deceuninck–Quick-Step | 15h 26' 35" |
| 2 | George Bennett (NZL) | Team Jumbo–Visma | + 18" |
| 3 | Mikel Landa (ESP) | Bahrain–McLaren | + 32" |
| 4 | Esteban Chaves (COL) | Mitchelton–Scott | + 35" |
| 5 | João Almeida (POR) | Deceuninck–Quick-Step | + 45" |
| 6 | Richard Carapaz (ECU) | Team Ineos | + 52" |
| 7 | Ben Hermans (BEL) | Israel Start-Up Nation | + 52" |
| 8 | Fabio Aru (ITA) | UAE Team Emirates | + 1' 03" |
| 9 | David de la Cruz (ESP) | UAE Team Emirates | + 1' 32" |
| 10 | Mikel Nieve (ESP) | Mitchelton–Scott | + 1' 35" |

=== Stage 5 ===
1 August 2020 – Covarrubias to Lagunas de Neila, 158 km (98 mi)

Stage 5 Result
| Rank | Rider | Team | Time |
|---|---|---|---|
| 1 | Iván Sosa (COL) | Team Ineos | 3h 47' 56" |
| 2 | Mikel Landa (ESP) | Bahrain–McLaren | + 9" |
| 3 | Remco Evenepoel (BEL) | Deceuninck–Quick-Step | + 11" |
| 4 | João Almeida (POR) | Deceuninck–Quick-Step | + 38" |
| 5 | Lennard Kämna (GER) | Bora–Hansgrohe | + 43" |
| 6 | Rafał Majka (POL) | Bora–Hansgrohe | + 44" |
| 7 | David Gaudu (FRA) | Groupama–FDJ | + 58" |
| 8 | Esteban Chaves (COL) | Mitchelton–Scott | + 1' 02" |
| 9 | Simon Yates (GBR) | Mitchelton–Scott | + 1' 10" |
| 10 | David de la Cruz (ESP) | UAE Team Emirates | + 1' 12" |

General classification after Stage 5
| Rank | Rider | Team | Time |
|---|---|---|---|
| 1 | Remco Evenepoel (BEL) | Deceuninck–Quick-Step | 19h 14' 42" |
| 2 | Mikel Landa (ESP) | Bahrain–McLaren | + 30" |
| 3 | João Almeida (POR) | Deceuninck–Quick-Step | + 1' 12" |
| 4 | Esteban Chaves (COL) | Mitchelton–Scott | + 1' 26" |
| 5 | George Bennett (NZL) | Team Jumbo–Visma | + 1' 40" |
| 6 | Richard Carapaz (ECU) | Team Ineos | + 1' 58" |
| 7 | Ben Hermans (BEL) | Israel Start-Up Nation | + 2' 25" |
| 8 | David de la Cruz (ESP) | UAE Team Emirates | + 2' 34" |
| 9 | Fabio Aru (ITA) | UAE Team Emirates | + 2' 36" |
| 10 | Mikel Nieve (ESP) | Mitchelton–Scott | + 3' 00" |

== Classification leadership ==
Classification leadership by stage
| Stage | Winner | General classification | Points classification | Mountains classification | Young rider classification | Team classification |
|---|---|---|---|---|---|---|
| 1 | Felix Großschartner | Felix Großschartner | Felix Großschartner | Gotzon Martín | João Almeida | Bora–Hansgrohe |
| 2 | Fernando Gaviria | Felix Großschartner | Felix Großschartner | Gotzon Martín | Eddie Dunbar | Bora–Hansgrohe |
| 3 | Remco Evenepoel | Remco Evenepoel | João Almeida | Gotzon Martín | Remco Evenepoel | Mitchelton–Scott |
| 4 | Sam Bennett | Remco Evenepoel | Sam Bennett | Gotzon Martín | Remco Evenepoel | Mitchelton–Scott |
| 5 | Iván Sosa | Remco Evenepoel | Mikel Landa | Gotzon Martín | Remco Evenepoel | Mitchelton–Scott |
| Final | | Remco Evenepoel | Mikel Landa | Gotzon Martín | Remco Evenepoel | Mitchelton–Scott |

- On stage 2, Alex Aranburu, who was fourth in the points classification, wore the green jersey, because first placed Felix Großschartner wore the violet jersey as leader of the general classification, second placed João Almeida wore the white jersey as leader of the young rider classification, and third placed Alejandro Valverde wore the Spanish national champion's jersey as the defending Spanish national road race champion.
- On stage 3, Fernando Gaviria, who was second in the points classification, wore the green jersey, because first placed Felix Großschartner wore the violet jersey as leader of the general classification.
- On stage 4, Óscar Rodríguez, who was third in the young rider classification, wore the white jersey, because first placed Remco Evenepoel wore the violet jersey as leader of the general classification, and second placed João Almeida wore the green jersey as leader of the points classification.
- On stage 5, João Almeida, who was second in the young rider classification, wore the white jersey, because first placed Remco Evenepoel wore the violet jersey as leader of the general classification.

== Classification standings ==
Legend
| Denotes the winner of the general classification | Denotes the winner of the mountains classification |
| Denotes the winner of the points classification | Denotes the winner of the young rider classification |

=== General classification ===
Final general classification (1–10)
| Rank | Rider | Team | Time |
|---|---|---|---|
| 1 | Remco Evenepoel (BEL) | Deceuninck–Quick-Step | 19h 14' 42" |
| 2 | Mikel Landa (ESP) | Bahrain–McLaren | + 30" |
| 3 | João Almeida (POR) | Deceuninck–Quick-Step | + 1' 12" |
| 4 | Esteban Chaves (COL) | Mitchelton–Scott | + 1' 26" |
| 5 | George Bennett (NZL) | Team Jumbo–Visma | + 1' 40" |
| 6 | Richard Carapaz (ECU) | Team Ineos | + 1' 58" |
| 7 | Ben Hermans (BEL) | Israel Start-Up Nation | + 2' 25" |
| 8 | David de la Cruz (ESP) | UAE Team Emirates | + 2' 34" |
| 9 | Fabio Aru (ITA) | UAE Team Emirates | + 2' 36" |
| 10 | Mikel Nieve (ESP) | Mitchelton–Scott | + 3' 00" |

=== Points classification ===
Final points classification (1–10)
| Rank | Rider | Team | Points |
|---|---|---|---|
| 1 | Mikel Landa (ESP) | Bahrain–McLaren | 48 |
| 2 | Remco Evenepoel (BEL) | Deceuninck–Quick-Step | 47 |
| 3 | João Almeida (POR) | Deceuninck–Quick-Step | 46 |
| 4 | Sam Bennett (IRL) | Deceuninck–Quick-Step | 41 |
| 5 | Arnaud Démare (FRA) | Groupama–FDJ | 40 |
| 6 | Esteban Chaves (COL) | Mitchelton–Scott | 27 |
| 7 | Iván Sosa (COL) | Team Ineos | 26 |
| 8 | Felix Großschartner (AUT) | Bora–Hansgrohe | 25 |
| 9 | Fernando Gaviria (COL) | UAE Team Emirates | 25 |
| 10 | George Bennett (NZL) | Team Jumbo–Visma | 23 |

=== Mountains classification ===
Final mountains classification (1–10)
| Rank | Rider | Team | Points |
|---|---|---|---|
| 1 | Gotzon Martín (ESP) | Euskaltel–Euskadi | 46 |
| 2 | Remco Evenepoel (BEL) | Deceuninck–Quick-Step | 41 |
| 3 | Mikel Landa (ESP) | Bahrain–McLaren | 32 |
| 4 | Jetse Bol (NED) | Burgos BH | 26 |
| 5 | George Bennett (NZL) | Team Jumbo–Visma | 25 |
| 6 | João Almeida (POR) | Deceuninck–Quick-Step | 24 |
| 7 | Esteban Chaves (COL) | Mitchelton–Scott | 21 |
| 8 | Iván Sosa (COL) | Team Ineos | 18 |
| 9 | Richard Carapaz (ECU) | Team Ineos | 12 |
| 10 | Diego Pablo Sevilla (ESP) | Kometa Xstra Cycling Team | 12 |

=== Young rider classification ===
Final young rider classification (1–10)
| Rank | Rider | Team | Time |
|---|---|---|---|
| 1 | Remco Evenepoel (BEL) | Deceuninck–Quick-Step | 19h 14' 42" |
| 2 | João Almeida (POR) | Deceuninck–Quick-Step | + 1' 12" |
| 3 | Óscar Rodríguez (ESP) | Astana | + 3' 37" |
| 4 | Cristián Rodríguez (ESP) | Caja Rural–Seguros RGA | + 4' 11" |
| 5 | Lennard Kämna (GER) | Bora–Hansgrohe | + 5' 41" |
| 6 | José Manuel Díaz (ESP) | Nippo–Delko–One Provence | + 5' 47" |
| 7 | David Gaudu (FRA) | Groupama–FDJ | + 6' 30" |
| 8 | Sepp Kuss (USA) | Team Jumbo–Visma | + 6' 31" |
| 9 | Urko Berrade (ESP) | Equipo Kern Pharma | + 6' 36" |
| 10 | Eddie Dunbar (IRL) | Team Ineos | + 6' 44" |

=== Teams classification ===
Final teams classification (1–10)
| Rank | Team | Time |
|---|---|---|
| 1 | Mitchelton–Scott | 57h 52' 38" |
| 2 | Deceuninck–Quick-Step | + 2' 03" |
| 3 | Astana | + 6' 31" |
| 4 | Team Ineos | + 7' 12" |
| 5 | Caja Rural–Seguros RGA | + 9' 27" |
| 6 | Equipo Kern Pharma | + 13' 39" |
| 7 | Bora–Hansgrohe | + 14' 24" |
| 8 | Bahrain–McLaren | + 15' 52" |
| 9 | Nippo–Delko–One Provence | + 19' 14" |
| 10 | Team Jumbo–Visma | + 24' 38" |
