= 2020 Volta ao Algarve =

2020 UCI Europe Tour 2020 UCI ProSeries

Race details
- Dates: 19–23 February 2020
- Stages: 5
- Distance: 771.4 km (479.3 mi)

Results
Jersey awarded to the overall winner	Winner	Remco Evenepoel (BEL)	(Deceuninck–Quick-Step)
	Second	Maximilian Schachmann (GER)	(Bora–Hansgrohe)
	Third	Miguel Ángel López (COL)	(Astana)
Jersey awarded to the points classification winner	Points	Fabio Jakobsen (NED)	(Deceuninck–Quick-Step)
Jersey awarded to the mountains classification winner	Mountains	Dries De Bondt (BEL)	(Alpecin–Fenix)
Jersey awarded to the youth classification winner	Youth	Remco Evenepoel (BEL)	(Deceuninck–Quick-Step)
	Team	Team Ineos	

The 2020 Volta ao Algarve was a road cycling stage race that took place in the Algarve region of Portugal between 19 and 23 February 2020. It was the 46th edition of the Volta ao Algarve and is rated as a 2.Pro event as part of the 2020 UCI Europe Tour and the 2020 UCI ProSeries.

== Teams ==
Twenty-five teams were invited to the race. Of these teams, twelve are UCI WorldTour teams, five are UCI Professional Continental teams, and eight are UCI Continental teams. Every team entered seven riders, except for Alpecin–Fenix, which entered six riders. A total of 174 riders started the race, of which 163 finished.

UCI WorldTeams

- Astana
- Bora–Hansgrohe
- CCC Team
- Cofidis
- Deceuninck–Quick-Step
- Groupama–FDJ
- Israel Start-Up Nation
- Lotto–Soudal
- Team Ineos
- Team Sunweb
- Trek–Segafredo
- UAE Team Emirates

UCI Professional Continental Teams

- Alpecin–Fenix
- Caja Rural–Seguros RGA
- Circus–Wanty Gobert
- Fundación–Orbea
- Uno-X Norwegian Development Team

UCI Continental Teams

- Atum General / Tavira / Maria Nova Hotel
- Aviludo–Louletano
- Efapel
- Kelly–InOutBuild–UDO
- LA Alumínios / LA Sport
- Miranda–Mortágua
- Rádio Popular–Boavista
- W52 / FC Porto

== Route ==
Stage characteristics and winners
Stage	Date	Course	Distance	Type	Stage winner
1	19 February	Portimão to Lagos	195.6 km (121.5 mi)	Flat stage	Fabio Jakobsen (NED)
2	20 February	Sagres to Fóia	183.9 km (114.3 mi)	Mountain stage	Remco Evenepoel (BEL)
3	21 February	Faro to Tavira	201.9 km (125.5 mi)	Flat stage	Cees Bol (NED)
4	22 February	Albufeira to Alto do Malhão	169.7 km (105.4 mi)	Hilly stage	Miguel Ángel López (COL)
5	23 February	Lagoa to Lagoa	20.3 km (12.6 mi)	Individual time trial	Remco Evenepoel (BEL)
Total		771.4 km (479.3 mi)			

== Stages ==
=== Stage 1 ===
19 February 2020 – Portimão to Lagos, 195.6 km (121.5 mi)

Stage 1 Result
Rank	Rider	Team	Time
1	Fabio Jakobsen (NED)	Deceuninck–Quick-Step	4h 55' 37"
2	Elia Viviani (ITA)	Cofidis	+ 0"
3	Matteo Trentin (ITA)	CCC Team	+ 0"
4	Alexander Kristoff (NOR)	UAE Team Emirates	+ 0"
5	Jon Aberasturi (ESP)	Caja Rural–Seguros RGA	+ 0"
6	Cees Bol (NED)	Team Sunweb	+ 0"
7	Roger Kluge (GER)	Lotto–Soudal	+ 0"
8	Davide Cimolai (ITA)	Israel Start-Up Nation	+ 0"
9	Daniel Hoelgaard (NOR)	Uno-X Norwegian Development Team	+ 0"
10	Edward Theuns (BEL)	Trek–Segafredo	+ 0"

General classification after Stage 1
Rank	Rider	Team	Time
1	Fabio Jakobsen (NED)	Deceuninck–Quick-Step	4h 55' 37"
2	Elia Viviani (ITA)	Cofidis	+ 0"
3	Matteo Trentin (ITA)	CCC Team	+ 0"
4	Alexander Kristoff (NOR)	UAE Team Emirates	+ 0"
5	Jon Aberasturi (ESP)	Caja Rural–Seguros RGA	+ 0"
6	Cees Bol (NED)	Team Sunweb	+ 0"
7	Roger Kluge (GER)	Lotto–Soudal	+ 0"
8	Davide Cimolai (ITA)	Israel Start-Up Nation	+ 0"
9	Daniel Hoelgaard (NOR)	Uno-X Norwegian Development Team	+ 0"
10	Edward Theuns (BEL)	Trek–Segafredo	+ 0"

=== Stage 2 ===
20 February 2020 – Sagres to Fóia, 183.9 km (114.3 mi)

Stage 2 Result
Rank	Rider	Team	Time
1	Remco Evenepoel (BEL)	Deceuninck–Quick-Step	4h 46' 38"
2	Maximilian Schachmann (GER)	Bora–Hansgrohe	+ 0"
3	Dan Martin (IRL)	Israel Start-Up Nation	+ 2"
4	Rui Costa (POR)	UAE Team Emirates	+ 2"
5	Tim Wellens (BEL)	Lotto–Soudal	+ 2"
6	Miguel Ángel López (COL)	Astana	+ 5"
7	Frederico Figueiredo (POR)	Atum General / Tavira / Maria Nova Hotel	+ 8"
8	Vincenzo Nibali (ITA)	Trek–Segafredo	+ 8"
9	Bauke Mollema (NED)	Trek–Segafredo	+ 8"
10	Amaro Antunes (POR)	W52 / FC Porto	+ 8"

General classification after Stage 2
Rank	Rider	Team	Time
1	Remco Evenepoel (BEL)	Deceuninck–Quick-Step	9h 42' 15"
2	Maximilian Schachmann (GER)	Bora–Hansgrohe	+ 0"
3	Rui Costa (POR)	UAE Team Emirates	+ 2"
4	Dan Martin (IRL)	Israel Start-Up Nation	+ 2"
5	Tim Wellens (BEL)	Lotto–Soudal	+ 2"
6	Miguel Ángel López (COL)	Astana	+ 5"
7	Amaro Antunes (POR)	W52 / FC Porto	+ 8"
8	Vincenzo Nibali (ITA)	Trek–Segafredo	+ 8"
9	Bauke Mollema (NED)	Trek–Segafredo	+ 8"
10	Frederico Figueiredo (POR)	Atum General / Tavira / Maria Nova Hotel	+ 8"

=== Stage 3 ===
21 February 2020 – Faro to Tavira, 201.9 km (125.5 mi)

Stage 3 Result
Rank	Rider	Team	Time
1	Cees Bol (NED)	Team Sunweb	5h 00' 51"
2	Sacha Modolo (ITA)	Alpecin–Fenix	+ 0"
3	Fabio Jakobsen (NED)	Deceuninck–Quick-Step	+ 0"
4	Alexander Kristoff (NOR)	UAE Team Emirates	+ 0"
5	Daniel Hoelgaard (NOR)	Uno-X Norwegian Development Team	+ 0"
6	Ryan Mullen (IRL)	Trek–Segafredo	+ 0"
7	Elia Viviani (ITA)	Cofidis	+ 0"
8	Roger Kluge (GER)	Lotto–Soudal	+ 0"
9	Jon Aberasturi (ESP)	Caja Rural–Seguros RGA	+ 0"
10	Tom Devriendt (BEL)	Circus–Wanty Gobert	+ 0"

General classification after Stage 3
Rank	Rider	Team	Time
1	Remco Evenepoel (BEL)	Deceuninck–Quick-Step	14h 43' 06"
2	Maximilian Schachmann (GER)	Bora–Hansgrohe	+ 0"
3	Dan Martin (IRL)	Israel Start-Up Nation	+ 2"
4	Rui Costa (POR)	UAE Team Emirates	+ 2"
5	Tim Wellens (BEL)	Lotto–Soudal	+ 2"
6	Miguel Ángel López (COL)	Astana	+ 5"
7	Amaro Antunes (POR)	W52 / FC Porto	+ 8"
8	Vincenzo Nibali (ITA)	Trek–Segafredo	+ 8"
9	Bauke Mollema (NED)	Trek–Segafredo	+ 8"
10	Frederico Figueiredo (POR)	Atum General / Tavira / Maria Nova Hotel	+ 8"

=== Stage 4 ===
22 February 2020 – Albufeira to Alto do Malhão, 169.7 km (105.4 mi)

Stage 4 Result
Rank	Rider	Team	Time
1	Miguel Ángel López (COL)	Astana	4h 16' 25"
2	Dan Martin (IRL)	Israel Start-Up Nation	+ 2"
3	Remco Evenepoel (BEL)	Deceuninck–Quick-Step	+ 4"
4	Maximilian Schachmann (GER)	Bora–Hansgrohe	+ 4"
5	Rui Costa (POR)	UAE Team Emirates	+ 5"
6	Simon Geschke (GER)	CCC Team	+ 14"
7	Amaro Antunes (POR)	W52 / FC Porto	+ 14"
8	Bauke Mollema (NED)	Trek–Segafredo	+ 14"
9	Jan Polanc (SLO)	UAE Team Emirates	+ 19"
10	Tim Wellens (BEL)	Lotto–Soudal	+ 21"

General classification after Stage 4
Rank	Rider	Team	Time
1	Remco Evenepoel (BEL)	Deceuninck–Quick-Step	18h 59' 35"
2	Dan Martin (IRL)	Israel Start-Up Nation	+ 0"
3	Maximilian Schachmann (GER)	Bora–Hansgrohe	+ 0"
4	Miguel Ángel López (COL)	Astana	+ 1"
5	Rui Costa (POR)	UAE Team Emirates	+ 3"
6	Amaro Antunes (POR)	W52 / FC Porto	+ 18"
7	Bauke Mollema (NED)	Trek–Segafredo	+ 18"
8	Tim Wellens (BEL)	Lotto–Soudal	+ 19"
9	Simon Geschke (GER)	CCC Team	+ 24"
10	Frederico Figueiredo (POR)	Atum General / Tavira / Maria Nova Hotel	+ 31"

=== Stage 5 ===
23 February 2020 – Lagoa to Lagoa, 20.3 km (12.6 mi) (ITT)

Stage 5 Result
Rank	Rider	Team	Time
1	Remco Evenepoel (BEL)	Deceuninck–Quick-Step	24' 07"
2	Rohan Dennis (AUS)	Team Ineos	+ 10"
3	Stefan Küng (SUI)	Groupama–FDJ	+ 19"
4	Maximilian Schachmann (GER)	Bora–Hansgrohe	+ 38"
5	Miguel Ángel López (COL)	Astana	+ 38"
6	Michał Kwiatkowski (POL)	Team Ineos	+ 38"
7	Patrick Bevin (NZL)	CCC Team	+ 38"
8	Yves Lampaert (BEL)	Deceuninck–Quick-Step	+ 46"
9	Nils Politt (GER)	Israel Start-Up Nation	+ 47"
10	Mads Würtz Schmidt (DEN)	Israel Start-Up Nation	+ 48"

General classification after Stage 5
Rank	Rider	Team	Time
1	Remco Evenepoel (BEL)	Deceuninck–Quick-Step	19h 23' 42"
2	Maximilian Schachmann (GER)	Bora–Hansgrohe	+ 38"
3	Miguel Ángel López (COL)	Astana	+ 39"
4	Rui Costa (POR)	UAE Team Emirates	+ 56"
5	Tim Wellens (BEL)	Lotto–Soudal	+ 1' 17"
6	Simon Geschke (GER)	CCC Team	+ 1' 18"
7	Lennard Kämna (GER)	Bora–Hansgrohe	+ 1' 26"
8	Bauke Mollema (NED)	Trek–Segafredo	+ 1' 31"
9	João Almeida (POR)	Deceuninck–Quick-Step	+ 1' 40"
10	Amaro Antunes (POR)	W52 / FC Porto	+ 1' 57"

== Classification leadership table ==
Classification leadership by stage
Stage	Winner	General classification	Points classification	Mountains classification	Young rider classification	Teams classification
1	Fabio Jakobsen	Fabio Jakobsen	Fabio Jakobsen	Diego López	Juan Fernando Calle	Israel Start-Up Nation
2	Remco Evenepoel	Remco Evenepoel	Fabio Jakobsen	Remco Evenepoel	Remco Evenepoel	Astana
3	Cees Bol	Remco Evenepoel	Fabio Jakobsen	Remco Evenepoel	Remco Evenepoel	Astana
4	Miguel Ángel López	Remco Evenepoel	Fabio Jakobsen	Dries De Bondt	Remco Evenepoel	UAE Team Emirates
5	Remco Evenepoel	Remco Evenepoel	Fabio Jakobsen	Dries De Bondt	Remco Evenepoel	Team Ineos
Final		Remco Evenepoel	Fabio Jakobsen	Dries De Bondt	Remco Evenepoel	Team Ineos

== Classification standings ==
=== General classification ===
Final general classification (1–10)
Rank	Rider	Team	Time
1	Remco Evenepoel (BEL)	Deceuninck–Quick-Step	19h 23' 42"
2	Maximilian Schachmann (GER)	Bora–Hansgrohe	+ 38"
3	Miguel Ángel López (COL)	Astana	+ 39"
4	Rui Costa (POR)	UAE Team Emirates	+ 56"
5	Tim Wellens (BEL)	Lotto–Soudal	+ 1' 17"
6	Simon Geschke (GER)	CCC Team	+ 1' 18"
7	Lennard Kämna (GER)	Bora–Hansgrohe	+ 1' 26"
8	Bauke Mollema (NED)	Trek–Segafredo	+ 1' 31"
9	João Almeida (POR)	Deceuninck–Quick-Step	+ 1' 40"
10	Amaro Antunes (POR)	W52 / FC Porto	+ 1' 57"

=== Points classification ===
Final points classification (1–10)
Rank	Rider	Team	Points
1	Fabio Jakobsen (NED)	Deceuninck–Quick-Step	41
2	Cees Bol (NED)	Team Sunweb	33
3	Alexander Kristoff (NOR)	UAE Team Emirates	26
4	Elia Viviani (ITA)	Cofidis	26
5	Remco Evenepoel (BEL)	Deceuninck–Quick-Step	25
6	Dan Martin (IRL)	Israel Start-Up Nation	22
7	Miguel Ángel López (COL)	Astana	20
8	Maximilian Schachmann (GER)	Bora–Hansgrohe	20
9	Sacha Modolo (ITA)	Alpecin–Fenix	20
10	Rui Costa (POR)	UAE Team Emirates	16

=== Mountains classification ===
Final mountains classification (1–10)
Rank	Rider	Team	Points
1	Dries De Bondt (BEL)	Alpecin–Fenix	17
2	Remco Evenepoel (BEL)	Deceuninck–Quick-Step	15
3	Tiago Antunes (POR)	Efapel	14
4	João Rodrigues (POR)	W52 / FC Porto	10
5	Dan Martin (IRL)	Israel Start-Up Nation	10
6	Maximilian Schachmann (GER)	Bora–Hansgrohe	10
7	Alexander Grigoryev (RUS)	Atum General / Tavira / Maria Nova Hotel	7
8	Miguel Ángel López (COL)	Astana	6
9	Frederico Figueiredo (POR)	Atum General / Tavira / Maria Nova Hotel	6
10	Michael Schär (SUI)	CCC Team	6

=== Young rider classification ===
Final young rider classification (1–10)
Rank	Rider	Team	Time
1	Remco Evenepoel (BEL)	Deceuninck–Quick-Step	19h 23' 42"
2	João Almeida (POR)	Deceuninck–Quick-Step	+ 1' 40"
3	Ilan Van Wilder (BEL)	Team Sunweb	+ 3' 39"
4	Andreas Leknessund (NOR)	Uno-X Norwegian Development Team	+ 3' 48"
5	Kevin Geniets (LUX)	Groupama–FDJ	+ 4' 20"
6	Harold Tejada (COL)	Astana	+ 4' 44"
7	Torjus Sleen (NOR)	Uno-X Norwegian Development Team	+ 6' 07"
8	Juan Fernando Calle (COL)	Caja Rural–Seguros RGA	+ 12' 59"
9	Brent Van Moer (BEL)	Lotto–Soudal	+ 14' 14"
10	Nicolas Saenz (COL)	Efapel	+ 17' 50"

=== Teams classification ===
Final teams classification (1–10)
Rank	Team	Time
1	Team Ineos	58h 19' 43"
2	UAE Team Emirates	+ 25"
3	CCC Team	+ 1' 51"
4	Astana	+ 2' 41"
5	Deceuninck–Quick-Step	+ 5' 09"
6	Groupama–FDJ	+ 7' 25"
7	Trek–Segafredo	+ 8' 36"
8	W52 / FC Porto	+ 10' 22"
9	Uno-X Norwegian Development Team	+ 12' 16"
10	Lotto–Soudal	+ 13' 37"
