= 2018 Tour of the Alps =

2018 UCI Europe Tour

Race details
- Dates: 16–20 April 2018
- Stages: 5
- Distance: 716.9 km (445.5 mi)
- Winning time: 18h 28' 48"

Results
Jersey awarded to the overall winner	Winner	Thibaut Pinot (FRA)	(Groupama–FDJ)
	Second	Domenico Pozzovivo (ITA)	(Bahrain–Merida)
	Third	Miguel Ángel López (COL)	(Astana)
Jersey awarded to the mountains classification winner	Mountains	Óscar Rodríguez (SPA)	(Euskadi–Murias)
Jersey awarded to the young rider classification winner	Young rider	Ben O'Connor (AUS)	(Team Dimension Data)
Jersey awarded to the sprints classification winner	Sprints	Pascal Eenkhoorn (NED)	(LottoNL–Jumbo)
	Team	Astana	

The 2018 Tour of the Alps was a road cycling stage race that took place in Austria and Italy between 16 and 20 April 2018. It was the 42nd edition of the renamed Giro del Trentino and was rated as a 2.HC event as part of the 2018 UCI Europe Tour. The race was won by Thibaut Pinot of Groupama–FDJ.

== Route ==
The race itinerary was announced in November 2017, including a final-day finish on the route of the men's road race for the 2018 UCI Road World Championships, to be held the following September in Innsbruck.

Stage schedule
Stage	Date	Route	Distance	Type	Winner
1	16 April	Arco (Italy) to Folgaria (Italy)	134.6 km (84 mi)	Medium-mountain stage	Pello Bilbao (ESP)
2	17 April	Lavarone (Italy) to Alpe di Pampeago–Fiemme (Italy)	145.5 km (90 mi)	Mountain stage	Miguel Ángel López (COL)
3	18 April	Auer (Italy) to Merano (Italy)	138.3 km (86 mi)	Medium-mountain stage	Ben O'Connor (AUS)
4	19 April	Klausen (Italy) to Lienz (Austria)	134.3 km (83 mi)	Medium-mountain stage	Luis León Sánchez (ESP)
5	20 April	Rattenberg (Austria) to Innsbruck (Austria)	164.2 km (102 mi)	Medium-mountain stage	Mark Padun (UKR)

== Teams ==
On 25 January 2018, the race's twenty competing teams – up from eighteen in 2017 – were announced at the 2017–18 FIS Nordic Combined World Cup event in Seefeld in Tirol, Austria. These included nine UCI WorldTeams, eight UCI Professional Continental teams, two UCI Continental teams and an Italian national team.

UCI WorldTeams

- AG2R La Mondiale
- Astana
- Bahrain–Merida
- Bora–Hansgrohe
- Team Dimension Data
- LottoNL–Jumbo
- Team Sky
- UAE Team Emirates
- Groupama–FDJ

UCI Professional Continental teams

- Androni Giocattoli–Sidermec
- Bardiani–CSF
- CCC–Sprandi–Polkowice
- Euskadi–Murias
- Gazprom–RusVelo
- Israel Cycling Academy
- Nippo–Vini Fantini–Europa Ovini
- Wilier Triestina–Selle Italia

UCI Continental teams

- Team Felbermayr–Simplon Wels
- Tirol Cycling Team

National teams

- Italy

== Stages ==
=== Stage 1 ===
16 April 2018 — Arco (Italy) to Folgaria (Italy), 134.6 km (84 mi)

Result of Stage 1
Rank	Rider	Team	Time
1	Pello Bilbao (ESP)	Astana	3h 26' 41"
2	Luis León Sánchez (ESP)	Astana	+ 6"
3	Iván Sosa (COL)	Androni Giocattoli–Sidermec	+ 6"
4	Thibaut Pinot (FRA)	Groupama–FDJ	+ 10"
5	Chris Froome (GBR)	Team Sky	+ 10"
6	Domenico Pozzovivo (ITA)	Bahrain–Merida	+ 10"
7	George Bennett (NZL)	LottoNL–Jumbo	+ 10"
8	Giulio Ciccone (ITA)	Bardiani–CSF	+ 10"
9	Ben Hermans (BEL)	Israel Cycling Academy	+ 10"
10	Fabio Aru (ITA)	UAE Team Emirates	+ 14"

General classification after Stage 1
Rank	Rider	Team	Time
1	Pello Bilbao (ESP)	Astana	3h 26' 31"
2	Luis León Sánchez (ESP)	Astana	+ 10"
3	Iván Sosa (COL)	Androni Giocattoli–Sidermec	+ 12"
4	Thibaut Pinot (FRA)	Groupama–FDJ	+ 20"
5	Chris Froome (GBR)	Team Sky	+ 20"
6	Domenico Pozzovivo (ITA)	Bahrain–Merida	+ 20"
7	George Bennett (NZL)	LottoNL–Jumbo	+ 20"
8	Giulio Ciccone (ITA)	Bardiani–CSF	+ 20"
9	Ben Hermans (BEL)	Israel Cycling Academy	+ 20"
10	Fabio Aru (ITA)	UAE Team Emirates	+ 24"

=== Stage 2 ===
17 April 2018 — Lavarone (Italy) to Alpe di Pampeago–Fiemme (Italy), 145.5 km (90 mi)

Result of Stage 2
Rank	Rider	Team	Time
1	Miguel Ángel López (COL)	Astana	3h 55' 30"
2	Thibaut Pinot (FRA)	Groupama–FDJ	+ 0"
3	Iván Sosa (COL)	Androni Giocattoli–Sidermec	+ 0"
4	Chris Froome (GBR)	Team Sky	+ 4"
5	Domenico Pozzovivo (ITA)	Bahrain–Merida	+ 7"
6	Giulio Ciccone (ITA)	Bardiani–CSF	+ 14"
7	Jan Hirt (CZE)	Astana	+ 20"
8	Ben O'Connor (AUS)	Team Dimension Data	+ 27"
9	Ben Hermans (BEL)	Israel Cycling Academy	+ 31"
10	Fabio Aru (ITA)	UAE Team Emirates	+ 34"

General classification after Stage 2
Rank	Rider	Team	Time
1	Iván Sosa (COL)	Androni Giocattoli–Sidermec	7h 22' 09"
2	Thibaut Pinot (FRA)	Groupama–FDJ	+ 6"
3	Miguel Ángel López (COL)	Astana	+ 6"
4	Chris Froome (GBR)	Team Sky	+ 16"
5	Domenico Pozzovivo (ITA)	Bahrain–Merida	+ 19"
6	Giulio Ciccone (ITA)	Bardiani–CSF	+ 26"
7	Jan Hirt (CZE)	Astana	+ 36"
8	Ben Hermans (BEL)	Israel Cycling Academy	+ 43"
9	Fabio Aru (ITA)	UAE Team Emirates	+ 50"
10	Pello Bilbao (ESP)	Astana	+ 1' 17"

=== Stage 3 ===
18 April 2018 — Auer (Italy) to Merano (Italy), 138.3 km (86 mi)

Result of Stage 3
Rank	Rider	Team	Time
1	Ben O'Connor (AUS)	Team Dimension Data	3h 30' 05"
2	Thibaut Pinot (FRA)	Groupama–FDJ	+ 5"
3	Domenico Pozzovivo (ITA)	Bahrain–Merida	+ 5"
4	George Bennett (NZL)	LottoNL–Jumbo	+ 5"
5	Luis León Sánchez (ESP)	Astana	+ 5"
6	Chris Froome (GBR)	Team Sky	+ 5"
7	Fabio Aru (ITA)	UAE Team Emirates	+ 5"
8	Manuel Senni (ITA)	Bardiani–CSF	+ 5"
9	Alexandre Geniez (FRA)	AG2R La Mondiale	+ 5"
10	Michal Schlegel (CZE)	CCC–Sprandi–Polkowice	+ 5"

General classification after Stage 3
Rank	Rider	Team	Time
1	Thibaut Pinot (FRA)	Groupama–FDJ	10h 52' 19"
2	Domenico Pozzovivo (ITA)	Bahrain–Merida	+ 15"
3	Miguel Ángel López (COL)	Astana	+ 15"
4	Chris Froome (GBR)	Team Sky	+ 16"
5	Fabio Aru (ITA)	UAE Team Emirates	+ 50"
6	George Bennett (NZL)	LottoNL–Jumbo	+ 1' 21"
7	Luis León Sánchez (ESP)	Astana	+ 1' 27"
8	Ben O'Connor (AUS)	Team Dimension Data	+ 1' 36"
9	Giulio Ciccone (ITA)	Bardiani–CSF	+ 1' 45"
10	Jan Hirt (CZE)	Astana	+ 1' 55"

=== Stage 4 ===
19 April 2018 — Klausen (Italy) to Lienz (Austria), 134.3 km (83 mi)

Result of Stage 4
Rank	Rider	Team	Time
1	Luis León Sánchez (ESP)	Astana	3h 19' 59"
2	George Bennett (NZL)	LottoNL–Jumbo	+ 6"
3	Koen Bouwman (NED)	LottoNL–Jumbo	+ 11"
4	Thibaut Pinot (FRA)	Groupama–FDJ	+ 11"
5	Fabio Aru (ITA)	UAE Team Emirates	+ 11"
6	Domenico Pozzovivo (ITA)	Bahrain–Merida	+ 11"
7	Nicola Conci (ITA)	Italy (national team)	+ 11"
8	Miguel Ángel López (COL)	Astana	+ 11"
9	Pello Bilbao (ESP)	Astana	+ 11"
10	Chris Froome (GBR)	Team Sky	+ 11"

General classification after Stage 4
Rank	Rider	Team	Time
1	Thibaut Pinot (FRA)	Groupama–FDJ	14h 12' 29"
2	Domenico Pozzovivo (ITA)	Bahrain–Merida	+ 15"
3	Miguel Ángel López (COL)	Astana	+ 15"
4	Chris Froome (GBR)	Team Sky	+ 16"
5	Fabio Aru (ITA)	UAE Team Emirates	+ 50"
6	Luis León Sánchez (ESP)	Astana	+ 1' 06"
7	George Bennett (NZL)	LottoNL–Jumbo	+ 1' 10"
8	Ben O'Connor (AUS)	Team Dimension Data	+ 1' 36"
9	Giulio Ciccone (ITA)	Bardiani–CSF	+ 1' 45"
10	Jan Hirt (CZE)	Astana	+ 1' 55"

=== Stage 5 ===
20 April 2018 — Rattenberg (Austria) to Innsbruck (Austria), 164.2 km (102 mi)

Result of Stage 5
Rank	Rider	Team	Time
1	Mark Padun (UKR)	Bahrain–Merida	4h 16' 10"
2	George Bennett (NZL)	LottoNL–Jumbo	+ 5"
3	Jan Hirt (CZE)	Astana	+ 6"
4	Giulio Ciccone (ITA)	Bardiani–CSF	+ 6"
5	Ben O'Connor (AUS)	Team Dimension Data	+ 6"
6	Thibaut Pinot (FRA)	Groupama–FDJ	+ 9"
7	Miguel Ángel López (COL)	Astana	+ 9"
8	Chris Froome (GBR)	Team Sky	+ 9"
9	Domenico Pozzovivo (ITA)	Bahrain–Merida	+ 9"
10	Kenny Elissonde (FRA)	Team Sky	+ 11"

Final general classification
Rank	Rider	Team	Time
1	Thibaut Pinot (FRA)	Groupama–FDJ	18h 28' 48"
2	Domenico Pozzovivo (ITA)	Bahrain–Merida	+ 15"
3	Miguel Ángel López (COL)	Astana	+ 15"
4	Chris Froome (GBR)	Team Sky	+ 16"
5	George Bennett (NZL)	LottoNL–Jumbo	+ 1' 00"
6	Fabio Aru (ITA)	UAE Team Emirates	+ 1' 19"
7	Ben O'Connor (AUS)	Team Dimension Data	+ 1' 33"
8	Luis León Sánchez (ESP)	Astana	+ 1' 35"
9	Giulio Ciccone (ITA)	Bardiani–CSF	+ 1' 42"
10	Jan Hirt (CZE)	Astana	+ 1' 48"

== Classification leadership table ==
In the 2018 Tour of the Alps, four different jerseys were awarded. The general classification was calculated by adding each cyclist's finishing times on each stage. Time bonuses were awarded to the first three finishers on all stages: the stage winner won a ten-second bonus, with six and four seconds for the second and third riders respectively. The leader of the general classification received a fuchsia jersey; this classification was considered the most important of the 2018 Tour of the Alps, and the winner of the classification was considered the winner of the race.

Points for the mountains classification
Position	1	2	3	4	5
Points for Category 1	10	8	6	4	2
Points for Category 2	6	4	2	0	
Points for Category 3	3	2	1	0	

The second classification was the sprints classification, the leader of which was awarded a red jersey. In the sprints classification, riders received points for finishing in the top three at intermediate sprint points during each stage. Points were awarded on a 6–4–2 scale for all stages.

There was also a mountains classification, for which points were awarded for reaching the top of a climb before other riders. Each of the ten climbs were categorised as either first, second, or third-category, with more points available for the more difficult, higher-categorised climbs. For first-category climbs, the top five riders earned points; on the other climbs, only the top three riders earned points. The leadership of the mountains classification was marked by a green jersey.

The fourth jersey represented the young rider classification, marked by a white jersey. Only riders born after 1 January 1995 were eligible; the young rider best placed in the general classification was the leader of the young rider classification. There was also a classification for teams, in which the times of the best three cyclists in a team on each stage were added together; the leading team at the end of the race was the team with the lowest cumulative time.

Stage	Winner	General classification	Mountains classification	Young rider classification	Sprints classification	Team classification
1	Pello Bilbao	Pello Bilbao	Giulio Ciccone	Iván Sosa	Pascal Eenkhoorn	Astana
2	Miguel Ángel López	Iván Sosa	Stephan Rabitsch	Iván Sosa	Marco Frapporti	Astana
3	Ben O'Connor	Thibaut Pinot	Thibaut Pinot	Ben O'Connor	Manuel Senni	Astana
4	Luis León Sánchez	Thibaut Pinot	Domenico Pozzovivo	Ben O'Connor	Ben Hermans	Astana
5	Mark Padun	Thibaut Pinot	Óscar Rodríguez	Ben O'Connor	Pascal Eenkhoorn	Astana
Final		Thibaut Pinot	Óscar Rodríguez	Ben O'Connor	Pascal Eenkhoorn	Astana
