= Miguel Ángel López (cyclist) =

Colombian cyclist (born 1994)

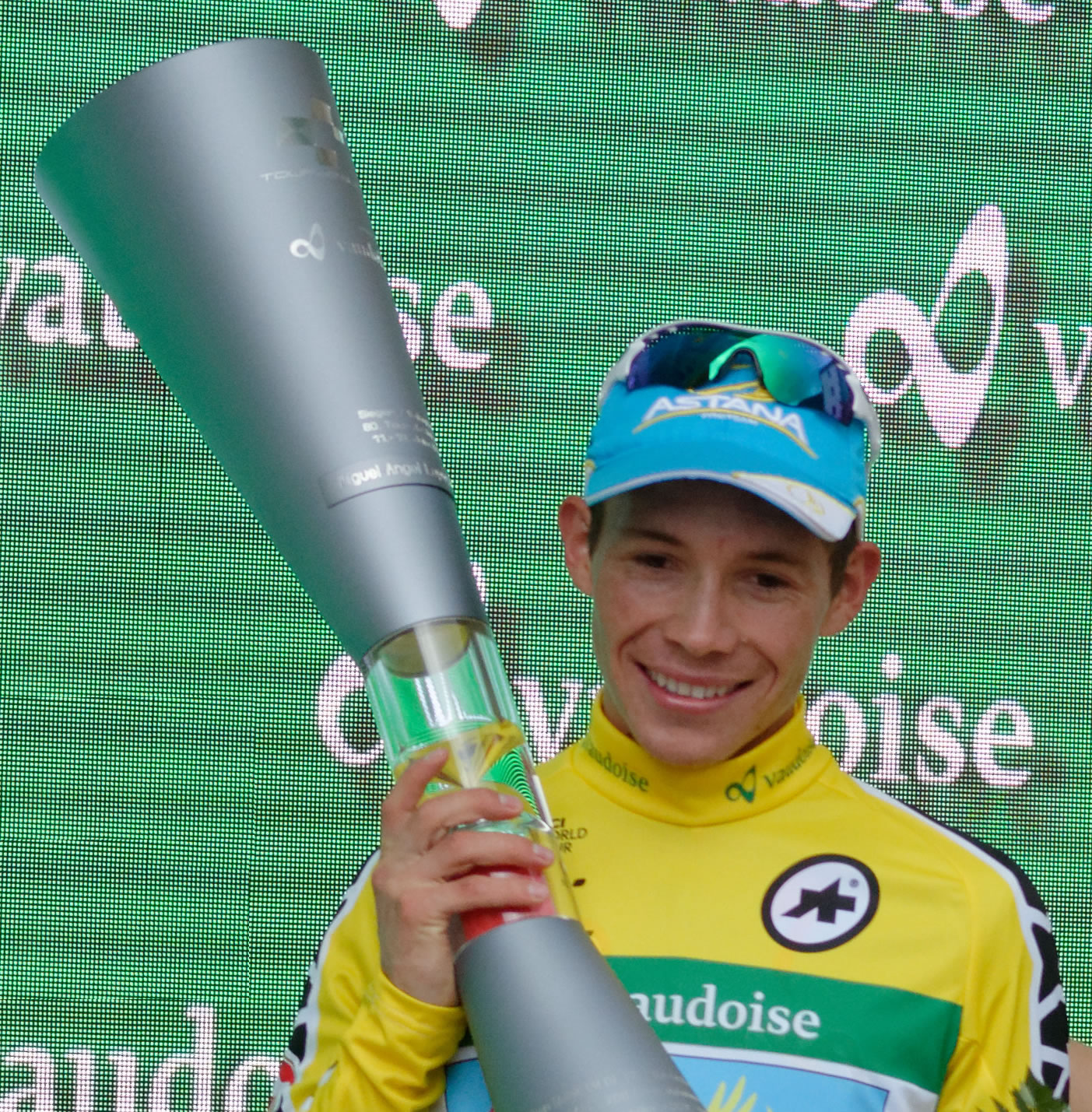
- López at the 2016 Tour de Suisse

Personal information
- Full name: Miguel Ángel López Moreno
- Nickname: Superman
- Born: February 4, 1994 (age 32) Pesca, Colombia
- Height: 1.64 m (5 ft 4 1/2 in)
- Weight: 59 kg (130 lb; 9 st 4 lb)

Cycling career
- Sport: Cycling
- Discipline: Road
- Role: Rider
- Rider type: Climber

Amateur team
- 2014: Lotería de Boyacá

Professional teams
- 2015–2020: Astana
- 2021: Movistar Team
- 2022: Astana Qazaqstan Team
- 2023: Team Medellín–EPM

Major wins
- Grand Tours Tour de France 1 individual stage (2020) Giro d'Italia Young rider classification (2018, 2019) Vuelta a España Young rider classification (2017) 3 individual stages (2017, 2021) 1 TTT stage (2019) Stage races Tour de Suisse (2016) Volta a Catalunya (2019) Vuelta a Andalucía (2021) Vuelta a San Juan (2023) One-day races and Classics National Time Trial Championships (2023) Milano–Torino (2016)
Medal record
Representing Colombia
Men's road cycling
Pan American Championships
Silver medal – second place	2023 Panama City	Time trial
Central American and Caribbean Games
Gold medal – first place	2023 San Salvador	Time trial
Silver medal – second place	2023 San Salvador	Road race

Miguel Ángel López Moreno (born February 4, 1994) is a Colombian cyclist, who last rode for UCI Continental team Team Medellín–EPM.

In 2016, López won his first World Tour stage race at the Tour de Suisse and achieved his maiden grand tour stage victory the following season on Stage 11 of the Vuelta a España, followed by another victory on Stage 15. He was the overall winner of the Tour Colombia and the Volta a Catalunya in 2019. In 2020, he won stage 17 of the Tour de France to Col de la Loze, considered the Queen stage.

In 2023, López was suspended by the UCI for an anti-doping rule violation, and in 2024 was found guilty for use and possession of Menotropin, a prohibited substance. He is currently suspended from competition until 24 July 2027.

== Career ==
López was born in Pesca. López celebrated success in 2014, winning multiple stage races while still an amateur. In August he won the Tour de l'Avenir, the most prestigious under 23 cycling race. López also won the U23 version of the Vuelta a Colombia.

=== Astana (2015–20) ===
==== 2015 ====
Following his success in 2014, López was granted a contract with Astana, a UCI WorldTeam. His success in stage races continued, finishing 4th overall and winning a stage at the Vuelta a Burgos and 7th overall in the Tour de Suisse.

==== 2016 ====
2016 was López's breakthrough season. He finished 4th in the Tour de San Luis, the first race of his season, winning Stage 6 and taking the young rider classification. One month later, López finished third and won a stage at the Tour de Langkawi, an eight-day race held in Malaysia. The biggest win yet of his career came at the Tour de Suisse, where he won the general classification ahead of Ion Izagirre and Warren Barguil. Following these successes, López was one of five riders selected to represent Colombia in the road race at the Olympics. López started his first grand tour at the Vuelta a España where he was the chosen team leader but he was forced to abandon the race on Stage 6 following a crash on Stage 3.

==== 2017 ====
López was named on the start list for the Vuelta a España in a strong Astana line-up alongside former race winner Fabio Aru. On Stage 11, he took his first grand tour stage victory, distancing himself from race favourites Chris Froome, Vincenzo Nibali and Wilco Kelderman in the last 2 kilometres (1.2 miles) of the first-category climb up to the Calar Alto Observatory. López's fine form in the mountains continued on Stage 14 to Sierra de la Pandera where he once again distanced the race leaders to finish second to Rafał Majka on the first especial category climb of the race. He went on to win the following Stage 15 after a solo escape on the summit finish, yet again distancing the race favorites for his second Vuelta stage victory.

==== 2018 ====
In May 2018, he was named in the startlist for the Giro d'Italia; he finished in third place overall, behind Chris Froome and Tom Dumoulin. He also made the podium in the Vuelta a España, finishing third overall behind Simon Yates and Enric Mas.

==== 2019 ====
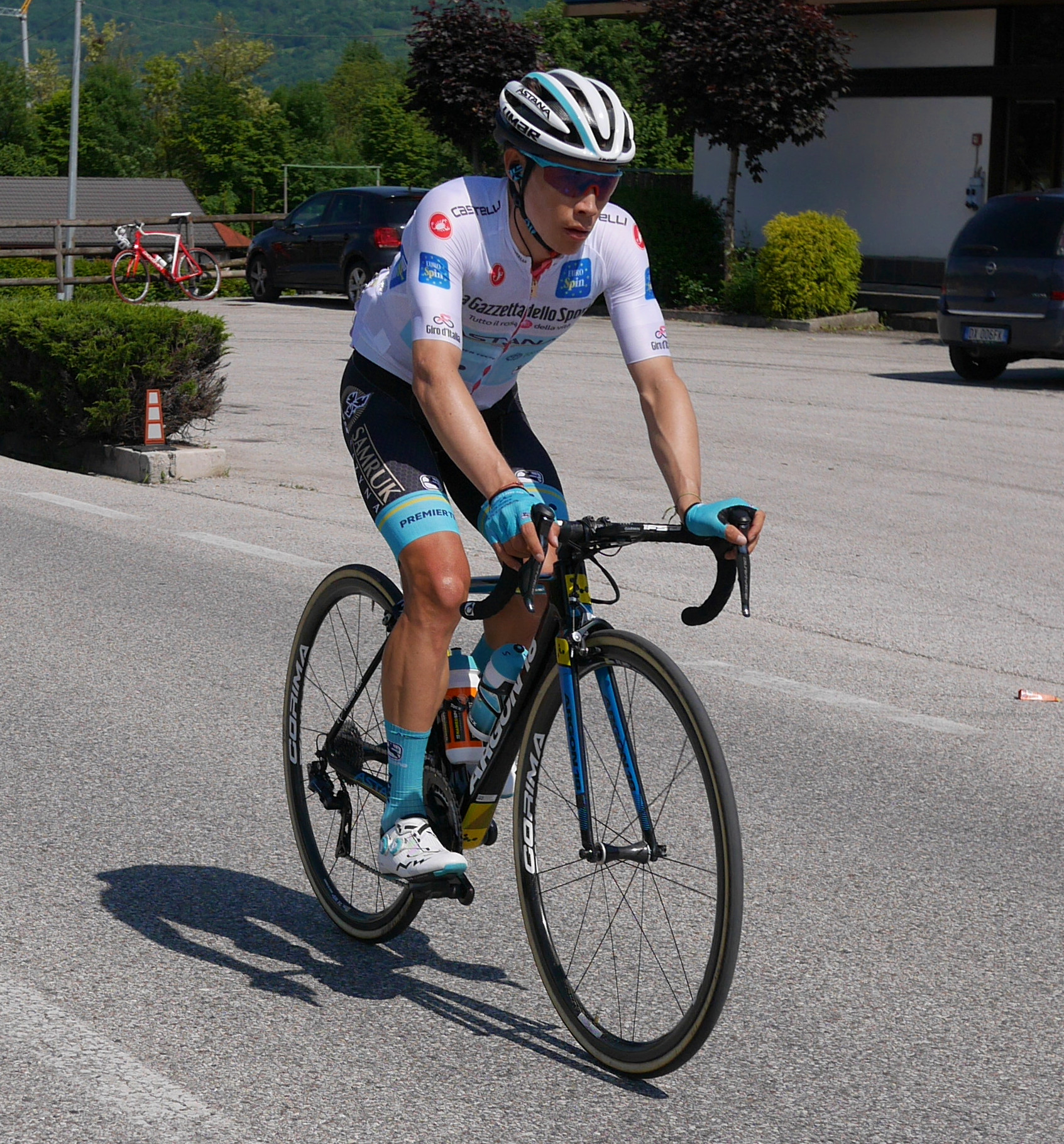
López at the 2019 Giro d'Italia

López won stage 4 and the general classification in March's Volta a Catalunya. López competed in the Giro d'Italia, finishing seventh overall and winning the young rider classification for a second time in a row. During stage 20 of the race, López was brought down in an incident with a fan about 5 kilometres (3.1 miles) from the finish. He proceeded to hit the spectator four times, including knocking the hat off his head. While the regulations of the sport's governing body, the Union Cycliste Internationale (UCI), call for disqualification of a rider who assaults someone during a race, the race jury decided against applying a punishment to López. He later apologised for the incident, but stated that riders should receive more respect from the crowd. One day later, after the Giro had ended, the UCI announced that they were investigating the lack of a penalty for his behaviour.

==== 2020 ====
In August 2020, he was named in the startlist for the Tour de France. López won stage 17, the queen stage, finishing atop the Col de la Loze. Near the end of the stage and at the steepest part of the climb – reaching gradients of up to 24% – López and Sepp Kuss caught the final breakaway rider Richard Carapaz. Kuss waited up for his leader Primož Roglič and López soloed to victory ahead of him and Tadej Pogačar, and moved into third in the general classification – a position that he was hoping to keep for the rest of the race. He held that position until the penultimate day, when he lost three or more minutes to the three riders immediately behind him in the overall standings, dropping to a final position of sixth.

=== Movistar Team ===
After six years with Astana, López signed a one-year contract with the Movistar Team, for the 2021 season. In August, the Movistar Team extended his contract to the end of 2023. During the Vuelta a España he finished second of the overall contenders in the first summit finish, on the third stage, at Picón Blanco. He ran as high as third overall in the first half of the race, trailing Primož Roglič, and teammate Enric Mas. He once again won the queen stage of a Grand Tour, winning the eighteenth stage that finished at El Gamoniteiru, the highest mountain in the autonomous community of Asturias. López attacked with 4 kilometres (2.5 miles) remaining and chased down the sole leader David de la Cruz; he ultimately won the stage by fourteen seconds from Roglič. During the penultimate stage, he missed a move among the other general classification contenders and found himself stuck in a group that had fallen behind. López abandoned the race a few kilometres later despite several team members encouraging him to continue. López later apologised for the manner of his withdrawal, but two weeks later, López and Movistar Team agreed to a mutual termination of his contract as at the end of the month. He later described Mas as a "selfish person" and the team atmosphere was "always very tense". The incident featured as part of the third season of The Least Expected Day, a documentary series about the team.

=== Return to Astana ===
In October 2021, López signed a two-year contract with the Astana–Premier Tech team, later renamed Astana Qazaqstan Team, from the 2022 season. He finished third overall at the Vuelta a Andalucía, and took his first victory of the season at the Tour of the Alps, winning the penultimate stage that finished at the Grossglockner. He was part of the Astana Qazaqstan Team at the Giro d'Italia, but withdrew from the race on its first Italian stage, stage four.

As the end of the 2022 Tour de France neared, López, who was not in the race that year, was stopped by police at a Madrid airport and questioned in a non blood doping drug trafficking investigation. Team Astana Qazaqstan issued a very surprised tweet on July 22, 04:02 that Lopez had been suspended by the team until a clarification was made regarding a Spanish professor he has had contact with. Initial reports that López himself was being investigated were denied by Spain's Guardia Civil police force. As of 12 December 2022 López's contract with Team Astana Qazaqstan was terminated.

== Doping ==
On 25 July 2023, it was announced that López has been provisionally suspended due to a potential anti-doping rule violation for use and possession of a prohibited substance in the weeks prior to the 2022 Giro d’Italia. On 29 May 2024, the UCI Anti-Doping Tribunal found López guilty of anti-doping rule violation (ADRV) for use and possession of a prohibited substance (Menotropin). He was banned from competing for four years, inclusive of his previous suspension. His suspension remains in force until 24 July 2027. After the ruling, López quickly filed an appeal with the Court of Arbitration for Sport (CAS), claiming his suspension was based on "manipulated phone call transcripts." On 7 May 2025, his appeal was rejected by the CAS. López then challenged the CAS decision before the Federal Supreme Court of Switzerland. He argued, among other things, that relying on evidence provided by the Spanish Anti-Doping Agency (CELAD) and imposing a significant fine violated procedural and substantive guarantees under the European Commission of Human Rights. In a judgement dated 19 August 2026, the Federal Tribunal dismissed López's challenge. The judgement is considered final.

== Major results ==
2014
1st Overall Tour de l'Avenir

1st Mountains classification
1st Stage 6

1st Overall Vuelta de la Juventud de Colombia

1st Stage 4

1st Overall Clásica de Samacá

1st Stages 1 & 2

1st Overall Clásica Aguazul

1st Stages 1 & 2

1st Stage 1 Clásica Fusagasugá
4th Time trial, National Under-23 Road Championships
2015 (1 pro win)
4th Overall Vuelta a Burgos

1st Young rider classification
1st Stages 2 (TTT) & 4

7th Overall Tour de Suisse
2016 (4)
1st Overall Tour de Suisse
1st Milano–Torino
3rd Overall Tour de Langkawi

1st Stage 4

4th Time trial, National Road Championships
4th Overall Tour de San Luis

1st Young rider classification
1st Stage 6

2017 (4)
2nd Overall Tour of Austria

1st Stage 4

4th Overall Vuelta a Burgos

1st Stage 5

8th Overall Vuelta a España

1st Young rider classification
1st Stages 11 & 15

2018 (3)
2nd Overall Vuelta a Burgos

1st Points classification
1st Stage 3

2nd Overall Tour of Oman

1st Young rider classification
1st Stage 5

2nd Milano–Torino
3rd Overall Giro d'Italia

1st Young rider classification

3rd Overall Vuelta a España
3rd Overall Abu Dhabi Tour

1st Young rider classification

3rd Overall Tour of the Alps

1st Stage 2

2019 (3)
1st Overall Volta a Catalunya

1st Young rider classification
1st Stage 4

1st Overall Tour Colombia

1st Young rider classification

2nd Time trial, National Road Championships
5th Overall Vuelta a España

1st Stage 1 (TTT)
Combativity award Stage 1 & Overall
Held after Stages 1, 5 & 7
Held after Stages 1–12 & 18–19

7th Overall Giro d'Italia

1st Young rider classification

2020 (2)
3rd Overall Volta ao Algarve

1st Stage 4

5th Overall Critérium du Dauphiné
6th Overall Tour de France

1st Stage 17

2021 (4)
1st Overall Vuelta a Andalucía

1st Stage 3

1st Mont Ventoux Dénivelé Challenge
1st Stage 18 Vuelta a España
6th Overall Critérium du Dauphiné
2022 (1)
1st Stage 4 Tour of the Alps
3rd Overall Vuelta a Andalucía

Voided results from May 2022.

~~3rd Overall Vuelta a Burgos~~

~~1st Mountains classification~~

~~4th Overall Vuelta a España~~
~~4th Giro del Veneto~~
~~2023 (3)~~
~~1st Time trial, National Road Championships~~
~~1st Overall Vuelta a San Juan~~

~~1st Stage 5~~

~~1st Overall Vuelta a Colombia~~

~~1st Points classification~~
~~1st Mountains classification~~
~~1st Prologue, Stages 1, 3, 4, 5, 6, 7, 8 & 9 (ITT)~~

~~1st Overall Vuelta a Catamarca~~

~~1st Mountains classification~~
~~1st Stage 3~~

~~1st Stage 1 Tour of the Gila~~
~~2nd Overall Vuelta Bantrab~~

~~1st Mountains classification~~
~~1st Stages 4 & 5~~

~~2nd Overall Joe Martin Stage Race~~

~~1st Stage 3 (ITT)~~

~~2nd Time trial, Pan American Road Championships~~
~~4th Overall Vuelta a Formosa~~

=== General classification results timeline ===
Grand Tour general classification results
Grand Tour	2015	2016	2017	2018	2019	2020	2021	2022
Giro d'Italia	—	—	—	3	7	DNF	—	DNF
Tour de France	—	—	—	—	—	6	DNF	—
Vuelta a España	—	DNF	8	3	5	—	DNF	~~4~~
Major stage race general classification results
Major stage race	2015	2016	2017	2018	2019	2020	2021	2022
Paris–Nice	—	—	—	—	28	—	—	—
Tirreno–Adriatico	—	—	—	16	—	—	—	21
Volta a Catalunya	DNF	42	—	—	1	NH	—	—
Tour of the Basque Country	—	20	—	—	—	NH	—	—
Tour de Romandie	—	DNF	—	—	—	NH	35	—
Critérium du Dauphiné	—	—	—	—	—	5	6	—
Tour de Suisse	7	1	DNF	—	—	NH	—	—

Legend
—	Did not compete
DNF	Did not finish
DSQ	Disqualified
IP	In progress
NH	Not held
