= 2018 Vuelta a Burgos =

2018 UCI Europe Tour

Race details
- Dates: 7 August – 11 August
- Stages: 5
- Distance: 775 km (481.6 mi)
- Winning time: 19h 00' 37"

Results
Jersey awarded to the overall winner	Winner	Iván Sosa (COL)	(Androni Giocattoli–Sidermec)
	Second	Miguel Ángel López (COL)	(Astana)
	Third	David de la Cruz (ESP)	(Team Sky)
Jersey awarded to the points classification winner	Points	Miguel Ángel López (COL)	(Astana)
Jersey awarded to the mountains classification winner	Mountains	Iván Sosa (COL)	(Androni Giocattoli–Sidermec)
Jersey awarded to the youth classification winner	Youth	Iván Sosa (COL)	(Androni Giocattoli–Sidermec)
	Team	Team Sky	

The 2018 Vuelta a Burgos was a men's road bicycle race which was held from 7 August to 11 August 2018. It is the 40th edition of the Vuelta a Burgos stage race, which was established in 1946. The race was rated as a 2.HC event and forms part of the 2018 UCI Europe Tour. The race was made up of five stages. Iván Sosa of Androni Giocattoli–Sidermec won the race.

== Teams ==
Fifteen teams entered the race. Each team had a maximum of seven riders:

UCI WorldTeams

- Movistar Team
- Team Sky
- Astana
- Team Dimension Data

UCI Professional Continental teams

- Caja Rural–Seguros RGA
- Delko–Marseille Provence KTM
- Fortuneo–Samsic
- Nippo–Vini Fantini–Europa Ovini
- Burgos BH
- Euskadi–Murias
- Direct Énergie
- Androni Giocattoli–Sidermec
- Wilier Triestina–Selle Italia

UCI Continental teams

- Polartec–Kometa
- Fundación Euskadi

== Route ==
Stage characteristics and winners
Stage	Date	Course	Distance	Type	Stage winner
1	7 August	Burgos to Burgos	157 km (98 mi)	Medium mountain stage	Francesco Gavazzi (ITA)
2	8 August	Belorado to Castrojeriz	163 km (101 mi)	Hilly stage	Matteo Moschetti (ITA)
3	9 August	Sedano to Espinosa de los Monteros	149 km (93 mi)	Mountain stage	Miguel Ángel López (COL)
4	10 August	Monastery of San Pedro de Cardeña to Clunia	165 km (103 mi)	Hilly stage	Carlos Barbero (ESP)
5	11 August	Salas de los Infantes	141 km (88 mi)	Mountain stage	Iván Sosa (COL)

== Results ==
Final general classification
Rank	Rider	Team	Time
1	Iván Sosa (COL)	Androni Giocattoli–Sidermec	19h 00' 37"
2	Miguel Ángel López (COL)	Astana	+ 17"
3	David de la Cruz (ESP)	Team Sky	+ 53"
4	Igor Antón (ESP)	Team Dimension Data	+ 1' 04"
5	Tao Geoghegan Hart (GBR)	Team Sky	+ 1' 25"
6	Sergio Pardilla (ESP)	Caja Rural–Seguros RGA	+ 1' 27"
7	Merhawi Kudus (ERI)	Team Dimension Data	+ 1' 41"
8	Sebastián Henao (COL)	Team Sky	+ 2' 23"
9	Louis Meintjes (RSA)	Team Dimension Data	+ 2' 33"
10	Kenny Elissonde (FRA)	Team Sky	+ 2' 34"

== Classification leadership ==
Stage	Winner	General classification	Points classification	Mountains classification	Young rider classification	Sprints classification "Meta Volantes"	Team classification
1	Francesco Gavazzi	Francesco Gavazzi	Francesco Gavazzi	Pablo Torres	Iván Sosa	Pablo Torres	Caja Rural–Seguros RGA
2	Matteo Moschetti	Jon Aberasturi	Jon Aberasturi	Pablo Torres	Iván Sosa	Egoitz Fernández	Caja Rural–Seguros RGA
3	Miguel Ángel López	Miguel Ángel López	Jon Aberasturi	Pablo Torres	Iván Sosa	Pablo Torres	Team Dimension Data
4	Carlos Barbero	Miguel Ángel López	Miguel Ángel López	Pablo Torres	Iván Sosa	Pablo Torres	Team Dimension Data
5	Iván Sosa	Iván Sosa	Miguel Ángel López	Iván Sosa	Iván Sosa	Pablo Torres	Team Sky
Final		Iván Sosa	Miguel Ángel López	Iván Sosa	Iván Sosa	Pablo Torres	Team Sky
