= Iván Sosa =

Colombian cyclist

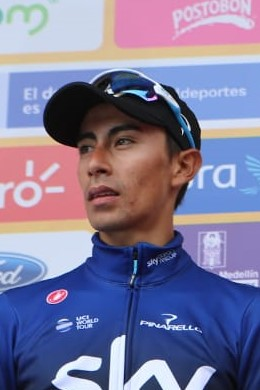

Personal information
- Full name: Iván Ramiro Sosa Cuervo
- Born: 31 October 1997 (age 28) Pasca, Colombia
- Height: 1.68 m (5 ft 6 in)
- Weight: 52 kg (115 lb)

Cycling career
- Sport: Cycling
- Current team: Equipo Kern Pharma
- Discipline: Road
- Role: Rider
- Rider type: Climber

Amateur team
- 2016: Maltinti Lampadari–Banca di Cambiano

Professional teams
- 2017–2018: Androni Giocattoli–Sidermec
- 2019–2021: Team Sky
- 2022–2024: Movistar Team
- 2025–: Equipo Kern Pharma

Major wins
- Stage races Vuelta a Burgos (2018, 2019) Tour de la Provence (2021) Tour de Langkawi (2022)

Iván Ramiro Sosa Cuervo (born 31 October 1997) is a Colombian cyclist, who currently rides for UCI ProTeam Equipo Kern Pharma.

== Career ==
=== Early life and amateur career ===
Sosa was born into a farming family in Pasca, Cundinamarca, a town located at high altitude in the Colombian Andes, near the capital Bogotá. His father, who is a cycling fan, chose the name Iván for his son after Iván Parra, a Colombian cyclist whom he admired. He is the cousin of professional cyclist Jhojan García, and a close friend of fellow Colombian cyclist Egan Bernal. He left Colombia for Europe in early 2016 to race for the amateur team Maltinti Lampadari-Banca di Cambiano, and settled in Empoli, Italy. His first win for the team came in June, in the 79th edition of the Schio-Ossario del Pasubio race.

=== Androni Giocattoli–Sidermec ===
In 2016, Sosa signed a two-year contract with Italian Professional Continental team Androni Giocattoli–Sidermec beginning with the 2017 season.

In January 2018, he took his first victory as a professional by winning the 4th stage of the Vuelta al Táchira. His real breakthrough came the following month though, when he finished an impressing 6th overall in the inaugural edition of the Colombian stage race Colombia Oro y Paz. In April, he was part of the team's line-up for the Tour of the Alps and wore the overall leader's jersey after finishing 3rd on the first two mountain stages, ahead of riders such as Chris Froome, Thibaut Pinot and Fabio Aru, but lost his leader's jersey after a crash during a descent on the third stage involving a race motorcycle.

Sosa was not a part of the team's planned line-up for the Giro d'Italia, and team manager Gianni Savio stated that Sosa's impressive performance at the Tour of the Alps had not made him reconsider his decision, despite Sosa "perhaps wanting to take part in the Giro". He explained his decision by saying his philosophy is to discover talents and let them develop little by little, continuing "It's one thing to ride a race such as the Tour of the Alps with great champions like Froome and Aru, but it has just five racing days and the stages are only short. It's another thing to throw a young 20-year-old rider with no international experience into a three week race such as the Giro d'Italia with stages of over 200 km". Instead he was part of the team's squad at the Tour of Bihor, a Romanian stage race, in early June, where he won the overall classification as well as one stage. Later the same month, he won the overall classification at the inaugural Adriatica Ionica Race, an Italian stage race, as well as one stage.

==== World Tour contract dispute ====
Sosa initially signed a two-year contract with Trek–Segafredo, beginning in 2019, with Trek paying Sosa's release clause of €120,000. However, after an initial press release from the team, as well as a video published from Sosa, a dispute between Alberati Fondriest Cycling Academy (Sosa's initial representation) and well-connected rider agent Giuseppe Acquadro occurred. Acquadro took over representation of Sosa, informing Trek that he would not be riding for the team. Androni reimbursed Trek for the release clause and in late November 2018, Cyclingnews.com announced that Sosa would sign for Team Sky on a three-year deal.

=== Team Sky ===
In May 2019, he was named in the startlist for the 2019 Giro d'Italia. In October 2020, he was named in the startlist for the 2020 Vuelta a España.

== Major results ==
2016
1st Schio-Ossario del Pasubio
2017
3rd Overall Tour of Bihor

1st Young rider classification

7th Overall Vuelta al Táchira

1st Young rider classification

2018 (6 pro wins)
1st Overall Vuelta a Burgos

1st Mountains classification
1st Young rider classification
1st Stage 5

1st Overall Adriatica Ionica Race

1st Young rider classification
1st Stage 3

1st Overall Sibiu Cycling Tour

1st Points classification
1st Mountains classification
1st Young rider classification
1st Stage 1

1st Overall Tour of Bihor

1st Young rider classification
1st Stage 2a

1st Stage 4 Vuelta al Táchira
6th Overall Tour de l'Avenir

1st Stage 7

6th Overall Colombia Oro y Paz
10th Overall Vuelta al Táchira

1st Stage 4

2019 (4)
1st Overall Vuelta a Burgos

1st Mountains classification
1st Young rider classification
1st Stage 3 & 5

2nd Overall Route d'Occitanie

1st Young rider classification
1st Stage 3

2nd Overall Tour Colombia

1st Mountains classification

2nd Gran Piemonte
2020 (1)
1st Stage 5 Vuelta a Burgos
2021 (2)
1st Overall Tour de la Provence

1st Young rider classification
1st Stage 3

2022 (4)
1st Overall Tour de Langkawi

1st Stage 3

1st Overall Vuelta a Asturias

1st Stage 2

5th Overall O Gran Camiño

1st Mountains classification

9th Overall Deutschland Tour
10th Overall Vuelta a Andalucía
2023
3rd Overall Vuelta a Asturias
6th Mont Ventoux Dénivelé Challenge
8th Overall Route d'Occitanie
2024
4th Mercan'Tour Classic
7th Overall Tour Colombia
9th Overall Tour of the Alps
2025
3rd Mercan'Tour Classic
2026 (1)
2nd Overall Tour of Turkiye

1st Stage 3

2nd Road race, National Road Championships
2nd Mercan'Tour Classic
5th Overall Sibiu Cycling Tour
5th Clásica Terres de l'Ebre

=== Grand Tour general classification results timeline ===
Grand Tour	2019	2020	2021	2022
Giro d'Italia	44	—	—	49
Tour de France	—	—	—	—
Vuelta a España	—	62	—	—
