= 2021 Mont Ventoux Dénivelé Challenge =

2021 UCI Europe Tour

Race details
- Dates: 8 June 2021
- Stages: 1
- Distance: 154 km (95.69 mi)
- Winning time: 4h 30' 04"

Results
	Winner	Miguel Ángel López (COL)	(Movistar Team)
	Second	Óscar Rodríguez (ESP)	(Astana–Premier Tech)
	Third	Enric Mas (ESP)	(Movistar Team)

The 2021 Mont Ventoux Dénivelé Challenge was the third edition of the Mont Ventoux Dénivelé Challenge road cycling one-day race, which was a category 1.1 event on the 2021 UCI Europe Tour. After the 2020 edition was postponed to August due to the COVID-19 pandemic, the race returned to its usual mid-June time slot.

The 154-kilometre (96 mi) long race in the southeastern French province of Provence started in Vaison-la-Romaine and featured two ascents of Mont Ventoux, with the race finishing at the summit of the second ascent. The first ascent took the eastern route from Sault, while the second ascent took the southern route from Bédoin.

== Teams ==
Seven of the nineteen UCI WorldTeams, eight UCI ProTeams, and five UCI Continental teams made up the twenty teams that participated in the race. All but six teams entered a full squad of seven riders: Arkéa–Samsic, Astana–Premier Tech, and Bike Aid each entered six riders, while Bahrain Cycling Academy, Cofidis, and Trek–Segafredo each entered five riders. With one late non-starter from Total Direct Énergie, there were 130 riders who started the race, from which 86 finished.

UCI WorldTeams

- AG2R Citroën Team
- Astana–Premier Tech
- Cofidis
- EF Education–Nippo
- Groupama–FDJ
- Movistar Team
- Trek–Segafredo

UCI ProTeams

- Arkéa–Samsic
- B&B Hotels p/b KTM
- Burgos BH
- Caja Rural–Seguros RGA
- Delko
- Equipo Kern Pharma
- Euskaltel–Euskadi
- Total Direct Énergie

UCI Continental Teams

- Bahrain Cycling Academy
- Bike Aid
- Electro Hiper Europa
- Global 6 Cycling
- St. Michel–Auber93

== Result ==
Result
Rank	Rider	Team	Time
1	Miguel Ángel López (COL)	Movistar Team	4h 30' 04"
2	Óscar Rodríguez (ESP)	Astana–Premier Tech	+ 2' 26"
3	Enric Mas (ESP)	Movistar Team	+ 2' 33"
4	Ben O'Connor (AUS)	AG2R Citroën Team	+ 3' 30"
5	Cristián Rodríguez (ESP)	Total Direct Énergie	+ 3' 30"
6	Kenny Elissonde (FRA)	Trek–Segafredo	+ 4' 02"
7	Michel Ries (LUX)	Trek–Segafredo	+ 4' 45"
8	Simon Carr (GBR)	EF Education–Nippo	+ 5' 41"
9	Carlos Verona (ESP)	Movistar Team	+ 5' 48"
10	Geoffrey Bouchard (FRA)	AG2R Citroën Team	+ 6' 10"
