= Juan Fernando Calle =

Colombian cyclist

Personal information
- Full name: Juan Fernando Calle Hurtado
- Born: 18 July 1999 (age 27) Salgar, Colombia
- Height: 1.77 m (5 ft 10 in)
- Weight: 59 kg (130 lb)

Cycling career
- Sport: Cycling
- Current team: Caja Rural–Seguros RGA
- Discipline: Road
- Role: Rider
- Rider type: Climber

Amateur teams
- 2016: Indeportes Antioquia Piensa en Grande
- 2017: Medellín–Inder junior
- 2017: Plataforma Central Iberum
- 2018–2019: Caja Rural–Seguros RGA amateur

Professional team
- 2020–: Caja Rural–Seguros RGA

Juan Fernando Calle Hurtado (born 18 July 1999) is a Colombian cyclist, who currently rides for UCI ProTeam Caja Rural–Seguros RGA.

== Major results ==
2016
3rd Overall Vuelta a Colombia Juniors

1st Stage 2
