= Óscar Rodríguez (cyclist) =

Spanish cyclist (born 1995)

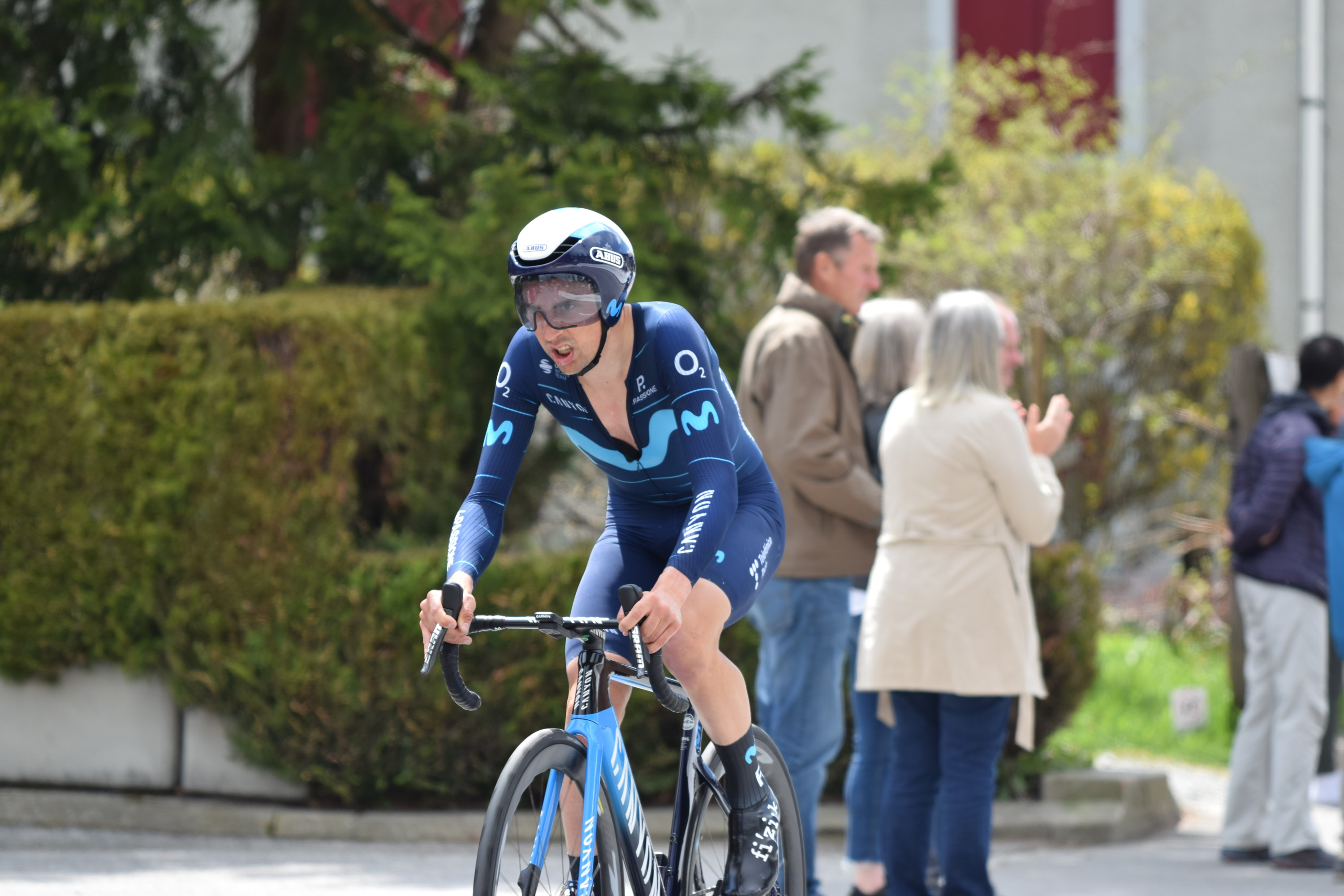
- Rodríguez at 2022 Tour de Romandie

Personal information
- Full name: Óscar Rodríguez Garaicoechea
- Born: 6 May 1995 (age 31) Burlada, Spain
- Height: 1.79 m (5 ft 10 in)
- Weight: 63 kg (139 lb)

Cycling career
- Sport: Cycling
- Current team: Netcompany–Ineos
- Discipline: Road
- Role: Rider
- Rider type: Climber

Amateur teams
- 2014–2016: Lizarte–AD Galibier
- 2016: Euskadi Basque Country–Murias (stagiaire)

Professional teams
- 2017–2019: Euskadi Basque Country–Murias
- 2020–2021: Astana
- 2022–2023: Movistar Team
- 2024–: INEOS Grenadiers

Major wins
- Grand Tours Vuelta a España 1 individual stage (2018)

Óscar Rodríguez Garaicoechea (born 6 May 1995 in Burlada) is a Spanish cyclist, who currently rides for UCI WorldTeam Netcompany–Ineos. In August 2018, he was named in the startlist for the Vuelta a España, winning stage 13. In October 2020, he was named in the startlist for the 2020 Giro d'Italia.

== Major results ==
2018
1st Stage 13 Vuelta a España
1st Mountains classification, Tour of the Alps
2019
2nd Overall Vuelta a Burgos
7th Tour du Finistère
8th Mont Ventoux Dénivelé Challenge
9th Overall Vuelta a Murcia
10th Overall Route d'Occitanie

1st Mountains classification

2020
5th Time trial, National Road Championships
9th Overall Volta a la Comunitat Valenciana
2021
2nd Mont Ventoux Dénivelé Challenge
3rd Overall Route d'Occitanie
6th Prueba Villafranca de Ordizia
7th Vuelta a Castilla y León
10th Overall Vuelta a Andalucía
2022
2nd Overall Tour de Hongrie
2024
6th Overall Tour of Norway
9th Overall Tour de Hongrie

=== Grand Tour general classification results timeline ===
Grand Tour	2018	2019	2020	2021	2022	2023
Giro d'Italia	—	—	45	—	—	DNF
Tour de France	—	—	—	—	—	—
Vuelta a España	51	22	—	DNF	—	—

Legend
—	Did not compete
DNF	Did not finish
