= 2019 Vuelta a Burgos =

2019 UCI Europe Tour

Race details
- Dates: 13 August – 17 August
- Stages: 5
- Distance: 787 km (489.0 mi)

Results
Jersey awarded to the overall winner	Winner	Iván Sosa (COL)	(Team Ineos)
	Second	Óscar Rodríguez (ESP)	(Euskadi–Murias)
	Third	Richard Carapaz (ECU)	(Movistar Team)
Jersey awarded to the points classification winner	Points	Alex Aranburu (ESP)	(Caja Rural–Seguros RGA)
Jersey awarded to the mountains classification winner	Mountains	Iván Sosa (COL)	(Team Ineos)
Jersey awarded to the youth classification winner	Youth	Iván Sosa (COL)	(Team Ineos)
	Team	Team Ineos	

The 2019 Vuelta a Burgos is a men's road bicycle race which takes place from 13 August to 17 August 2019. It is the 41st edition of the Vuelta a Burgos stage race, which was established in 1946. The race is rated as a 2.HC event and forms part of the 2019 UCI Europe Tour. The race is made up of five stages.

== Teams ==
Eighteen teams entered the race. Each team had a maximum of seven riders:

UCI WorldTeams

- Movistar Team
- Team Dimension Data
- Team Ineos
- UAE Team Emirates

UCI Professional Continental Teams

- Androni Giocattoli–Sidermec
- Burgos BH
- Caja Rural–Seguros RGA
- Delko–Marseille Provence
- Euskadi–Murias
- Gazprom–RusVelo
- Israel Cycling Academy
- Nippo–Vini Fantini–Faizanè
- W52 / FC Porto
- Wanty–Gobert
- Vital Concept–B&B Hotels

UCI Continental Teams

- Fundación Euskadi
- IAM–Excelsior
- Kometa Cycling Team

== Route ==
Stage characteristics and winners
Stage	Date	Course	Distance	Type	Stage winner
1	13 August	Burgos to Burgos	162 km (101 mi)	Medium mountain stage	Giacomo Nizzolo (ITA)
2	14 August	Gumiel de Izán to Lerma	155 km (96 mi)	Flat stage	Jon Aberasturi (ESP)
3	15 August	Sargentes de La Lora to Picón Blanco (Espinosa de los Monteros)	150 km (93 mi)	Mountain stage	Iván Sosa (COL)
4	16 August	Atapuerca to Clunia	174 km (108 mi)	Hilly stage	Alex Aranburu (ESP)
5	17 August	Santa Domingo de Silos to Lagunas de Neila	146 km (91 mi)	Mountain stage	Iván Sosa (COL)
Total		787 km (489 mi)			

== Stages ==
=== Stage 1 ===
13 August 2019 – Burgos to Burgos, 162 km (101 mi)

Stage 1 result
Rank	Rider	Team	Time
1	Giacomo Nizzolo (ITA)	Team Dimension Data	3h 39' 17"
2	Alex Aranburu (ESP)	Caja Rural–Seguros RGA	+ 0"
3	Eduard-Michael Grosu (ROM)	Delko–Marseille Provence	+ 5"
4	Rui Costa (POR)	UAE Team Emirates	+ 5"
5	Sergey Chernetskiy (RUS)	Caja Rural–Seguros RGA	+ 5"
6	Gonzalo Serrano (ESP)	Caja Rural–Seguros RGA	+ 7"
7	Guillaume Martin (FRA)	Wanty–Gobert	+ 7"
8	Francesco Gavazzi (ITA)	Androni Giocattoli–Sidermec	+ 9"
9	Fabian Lienhard (SUI)	IAM–Excelsior	+ 9"
10	Alexandr Riabushenko (BLR)	UAE Team Emirates	+ 9"

General classification after Stage 1
Rank	Rider	Team	Time
1	Giacomo Nizzolo (ITA)	Team Dimension Data	3h 39' 17"
2	Alex Aranburu (ESP)	Caja Rural–Seguros RGA	+ 0"
3	Eduard-Michael Grosu (ROM)	Delko–Marseille Provence	+ 5"
4	Rui Costa (POR)	UAE Team Emirates	+ 5"
5	Sergey Chernetskiy (RUS)	Caja Rural–Seguros RGA	+ 5"
6	Gonzalo Serrano (ESP)	Caja Rural–Seguros RGA	+ 7"
7	Guillaume Martin (FRA)	Wanty–Gobert	+ 7"
8	Francesco Gavazzi (ITA)	Androni Giocattoli–Sidermec	+ 9"
9	Fabian Lienhard (SUI)	IAM–Excelsior	+ 9"
10	Alexandr Riabushenko (BLR)	UAE Team Emirates	+ 9"

=== Stage 2 ===
14 August 2019 – Gumiel de Izán to Lerma, 155 km (96 mi)

Stage 2 result
Rank	Rider	Team	Time
1	Jon Aberasturi (ESP)	Caja Rural–Seguros RGA	3h 33' 49"
2	Giacomo Nizzolo (ITA)	Team Dimension Data	+ 2"
3	Jhonatan Narváez (ECU)	Team Ineos	+ 2"
4	Manuel Belletti (ITA)	Androni Giocattoli–Sidermec	+ 2"
5	Alex Aranburu (ESP)	Caja Rural–Seguros RGA	+ 2"
6	Juan José Lobato (ESP)	Nippo–Vini Fantini–Faizanè	+ 5"
7	Mihkel Räim (EST)	Israel Cycling Academy	+ 5"
8	Kris Boeckmans (BEL)	Vital Concept–B&B Hotels	+ 5"
9	Fabian Lienhard (SUI)	IAM–Excelsior	+ 5"
10	Gonzalo Serrano (ESP)	Caja Rural–Seguros RGA	+ 5"

General classification after Stage 2
Rank	Rider	Team	Time
1	Giacomo Nizzolo (ITA)	Team Dimension Data	7h 13' 08"
2	Alex Aranburu (ESP)	Caja Rural–Seguros RGA	+ 0"
3	Sergey Chernetskiy (RUS)	Caja Rural–Seguros RGA	+ 8"
4	Eduard-Michael Grosu (ROM)	Delko–Marseille Provence	+ 8"
5	Gonzalo Serrano (ESP)	Caja Rural–Seguros RGA	+ 10"
6	Guillaume Martin (FRA)	Wanty–Gobert	+ 10"
7	Fabian Lienhard (SUI)	IAM–Excelsior	+ 12"
8	Carlos Betancur (COL)	Movistar Team	+ 12"
9	Francesco Gavazzi (ITA)	Androni Giocattoli–Sidermec	+ 12"
10	Cyril Gautier (FRA)	Vital Concept–B&B Hotels	+ 12"

=== Stage 3 ===
15 August 2019 – Sargentes de La Lora to Picón Blanco (Espinosa de los Monteros), 150 km (93 mi)

Stage 3 result
Rank	Rider	Team	Time
1	Iván Sosa (COL)	Team Ineos	3h 58' 21"
2	Óscar Rodríguez (ESP)	Euskadi–Murias	+ 17"
3	Antonio Pedrero (ESP)	Movistar Team	+ 24"
4	David de la Cruz (ESP)	Team Ineos	+ 30"
5	Kevin Rivera (CRC)	Androni Giocattoli–Sidermec	+ 30"
6	Richard Carapaz (ECU)	Movistar Team	+ 37"
7	Pierre Rolland (FRA)	Vital Concept–B&B Hotels	+ 49"
8	Guillaume Martin (FRA)	Wanty–Gobert	+ 1' 07"
9	Amanuel Ghebreigzabhier (ERI)	Team Dimension Data	+ 1' 10"
10	Rui Vinhas (POR)	W52 / FC Porto	+ 1' 12"

General classification after Stage 3
Rank	Rider	Team	Time
1	Iván Sosa (COL)	Team Ineos	11h 11' 47"
2	Óscar Rodríguez (ESP)	Euskadi–Murias	+ 17"
3	Antonio Pedrero (ESP)	Movistar Team	+ 24"
4	David de la Cruz (ESP)	Team Ineos	+ 30"
5	Richard Carapaz (ECU)	Movistar Team	+ 37"
6	Guillaume Martin (FRA)	Wanty–Gobert	+ 59"
7	Pierre Rolland (FRA)	Vital Concept–B&B Hotels	+ 59"
8	Amanuel Ghebreigzabhier (ERI)	Team Dimension Data	+ 1' 07"
9	Rui Vinhas (POR)	W52 / FC Porto	+ 1' 12"
10	Nikolay Cherkasov (RUS)	Gazprom–RusVelo	+ 1' 14"

=== Stage 4 ===
16 August 2019 – Atapuerca to Clunia, 174 km (108 mi)

Stage 4 result
Rank	Rider	Team	Time
1	Alex Aranburu (ESP)	Caja Rural–Seguros RGA	4h 07' 55"
2	Alexandr Riabushenko (BLR)	UAE Team Emirates	+ 0"
3	Rui Costa (POR)	UAE Team Emirates	+ 0"
4	Cyril Gautier (FRA)	Vital Concept–B&B Hotels	+ 0"
5	Jhonatan Narváez (ECU)	Team Ineos	+ 0"
6	Richard Carapaz (ECU)	Movistar Team	+ 0"
7	Pierre Rolland (FRA)	Vital Concept–B&B Hotels	+ 6"
8	Giacomo Nizzolo (ITA)	Team Dimension Data	+ 6"
9	Nikolay Cherkasov (RUS)	Gazprom–RusVelo	+ 6"
10	César Fonte (POR)	W52 / FC Porto	+ 6"

General classification after Stage 4
Rank	Rider	Team	Time
1	Iván Sosa (COL)	Team Ineos	15h 19' 51"
2	Óscar Rodríguez (ESP)	Euskadi–Murias	+ 17"
3	Antonio Pedrero (ESP)	Movistar Team	+ 24"
4	Richard Carapaz (ECU)	Movistar Team	+ 28"
5	David de la Cruz (ESP)	Team Ineos	+ 30"
6	Pierre Rolland (FRA)	Vital Concept–B&B Hotels	+ 56"
7	Guillaume Martin (FRA)	Wanty–Gobert	+ 59"
8	Amanuel Ghebreigzabhier (ERI)	Team Dimension Data	+ 1' 04"
9	Nikolay Cherkasov (RUS)	Gazprom–RusVelo	+ 1' 11"
10	Rui Vinhas (POR)	W52 / FC Porto	+ 1' 12"

=== Stage 5 ===
17 August 2019 – Santa Domingo de Silos to Lagunas de Neila, 146 km (91 mi)

Stage 5 result
Rank	Rider	Team	Time
1	Iván Sosa (COL)	Team Ineos	3h 33' 53"
2	Rui Costa (POR)	UAE Team Emirates	+ 8"
3	Amanuel Ghebreigzabhier (ERI)	Team Dimension Data	+ 14"
4	Richard Carapaz (ECU)	Movistar Team	+ 14"
5	Guillaume Martin (FRA)	Wanty–Gobert	+ 14"
6	Óscar Rodríguez (ESP)	Euskadi–Murias	+ 14"
7	Antonio Pedrero (ESP)	Movistar Team	+ 22"
8	Mikel Bizkarra (ESP)	Euskadi–Murias	+ 37"
9	Nikolay Cherkasov (RUS)	Gazprom–RusVelo	+ 41"
10	Pierre Rolland (FRA)	Vital Concept–B&B Hotels	+ 43"

General classification after Stage 5
Rank	Rider	Team	Time
1	Iván Sosa (COL)	Team Ineos	18h 53' 44"
2	Óscar Rodríguez (ESP)	Euskadi–Murias	+ 31"
3	Richard Carapaz (ECU)	Movistar Team	+ 42"
4	Antonio Pedrero (ESP)	Movistar Team	+ 46"
5	Guillaume Martin (FRA)	Wanty–Gobert	+ 1' 13"
6	Amanuel Ghebreigzabhier (ERI)	Team Dimension Data	+ 1' 18"
7	Pierre Rolland (FRA)	Vital Concept–B&B Hotels	+ 1' 39"
8	David de la Cruz (ESP)	Team Ineos	+ 1' 44"
9	Nikolay Cherkasov (RUS)	Gazprom–RusVelo	+ 1' 52"
10	Rui Costa (POR)	UAE Team Emirates	+ 2' 05"

== Classification leadership ==
Stage	Winner	General classification	Points classification	Mountains classification	Young rider classification	Team classification
1	Giacomo Nizzolo	Giacomo Nizzolo	Giacomo Nizzolo	Giacomo Nizzolo	Alex Aranburu	Caja Rural–Seguros RGA
2	Jon Aberasturi	Giacomo Nizzolo	Giacomo Nizzolo	Giacomo Nizzolo	Alex Aranburu	Caja Rural–Seguros RGA
3	Iván Sosa	Iván Sosa	Giacomo Nizzolo	Iván Sosa	Iván Sosa	Euskadi–Murias
4	Alex Aranburu	Iván Sosa	Alex Aranburu	Iván Sosa	Iván Sosa	Euskadi–Murias
5	Iván Sosa	Iván Sosa	Alex Aranburu	Iván Sosa	Iván Sosa	Team Ineos
Final		Iván Sosa	Alex Aranburu	Iván Sosa	Iván Sosa	Team Ineos

== Classification standings ==
Legend
Denotes the winner of the general classification	Denotes the winner of the mountains classification
Denotes the winner of the points classification	Denotes the winner of the young rider classification

=== General classification ===
Final general classification (1-10)
Rank	Rider	Team	Time
1	Iván Sosa (COL)	Team Ineos	18h 53' 44"
2	Óscar Rodríguez (ESP)	Euskadi–Murias	+ 31"
3	Richard Carapaz (ECU)	Movistar Team	+ 42"
4	Antonio Pedrero (ESP)	Movistar Team	+ 46"
5	Guillaume Martin (FRA)	Wanty–Gobert	+ 1' 13"
6	Amanuel Ghebreigzabhier (ERI)	Team Dimension Data	+ 1' 18"
7	Pierre Rolland (FRA)	Vital Concept–B&B Hotels	+ 1' 39"
8	David de la Cruz (ESP)	Team Ineos	+ 1' 44"
9	Nikolay Cherkasov (RUS)	Gazprom–RusVelo	+ 1' 52"
10	Rui Costa (POR)	UAE Team Emirates	+ 2' 05"

=== Points classification ===
Final points classification (1-10)
Rank	Rider	Team	Points
1	Alex Aranburu (ESP)	Caja Rural–Seguros RGA	57
2	Iván Sosa (COL)	Team Ineos	51
3	Rui Costa (POR)	UAE Team Emirates	50
4	Richard Carapaz (ECU)	Movistar Team	39
5	Óscar Rodríguez (ESP)	Euskadi–Murias	30
6	Guillaume Martin (FRA)	Wanty–Gobert	29
7	Amanuel Ghebreigzabhier (ERI)	Team Dimension Data	29
8	Jhonatan Narváez (ECU)	Team Ineos	28
9	Jon Aberasturi (ESP)	Caja Rural–Seguros RGA	27
10	Alexandr Riabushenko (BLR)	UAE Team Emirates	26

=== Mountains classification ===
Final mountains classification (1-10)
Rank	Rider	Team	Points
1	Iván Sosa (COL)	Team Ineos	60
2	Simon Pellaud (SUI)	IAM–Excelsior	40
3	Óscar Rodríguez (ESP)	Euskadi–Murias	35
4	Antonio Pedrero (ESP)	Movistar Team	28
5	Richard Carapaz (ECU)	Movistar Team	26
6	Rui Costa (POR)	UAE Team Emirates	26
7	Amanuel Ghebreigzabhier (ERI)	Team Dimension Data	24
8	Guillaume Martin (FRA)	Wanty–Gobert	18
9	David de la Cruz (ESP)	Team Ineos	16
10	Ángel Madrazo (ESP)	Burgos BH	13

=== Young rider classification ===
Final young rider classification (1-10)
Rank	Rider	Team	Time
1	Iván Sosa (COL)	Team Ineos	18h 53' 44"
2	Óscar Rodríguez (ESP)	Euskadi–Murias	+ 31"
3	Amanuel Ghebreigzabhier (ERI)	Team Dimension Data	+ 1' 18"
4	Nikolay Cherkasov (RUS)	Gazprom–RusVelo	+ 1' 52"
5	Sergio Samitier (ESP)	Euskadi–Murias	+ 3' 39"
6	Joan Bou (ESP)	Nippo–Vini Fantini–Faizanè	+ 4' 16"
7	Miguel Flórez (COL)	Androni Giocattoli–Sidermec	+ 4' 48"
8	Márton Dina (HUN)	Kometa Cycling Team	+ 6' 59"
9	Daniel Muñoz (COL)	Androni Giocattoli–Sidermec	+ 8' 13"
10	Jhonatan Narváez (ECU)	Team Ineos	+ 9' 07"

=== Teams classification ===
Final teams classification (1-10)
Rank	Team	Time
1	Team Ineos	56h 47' 16"
2	Euskadi–Murias	+ 10"
3	Movistar Team	+ 6' 24"
4	Androni Giocattoli–Sidermec	+ 9' 28"
5	Caja Rural–Seguros RGA	+ 9' 48"
6	Wanty–Gobert	+ 17' 26"
7	Delko–Marseille Provence	+ 19' 12"
8	Burgos BH	+ 19' 31"
9	UAE Team Emirates	+ 23' 40"
10	Vital Concept–B&B Hotels	+ 27' 30"
