= David de la Cruz =

Spanish cyclist (born 1989)

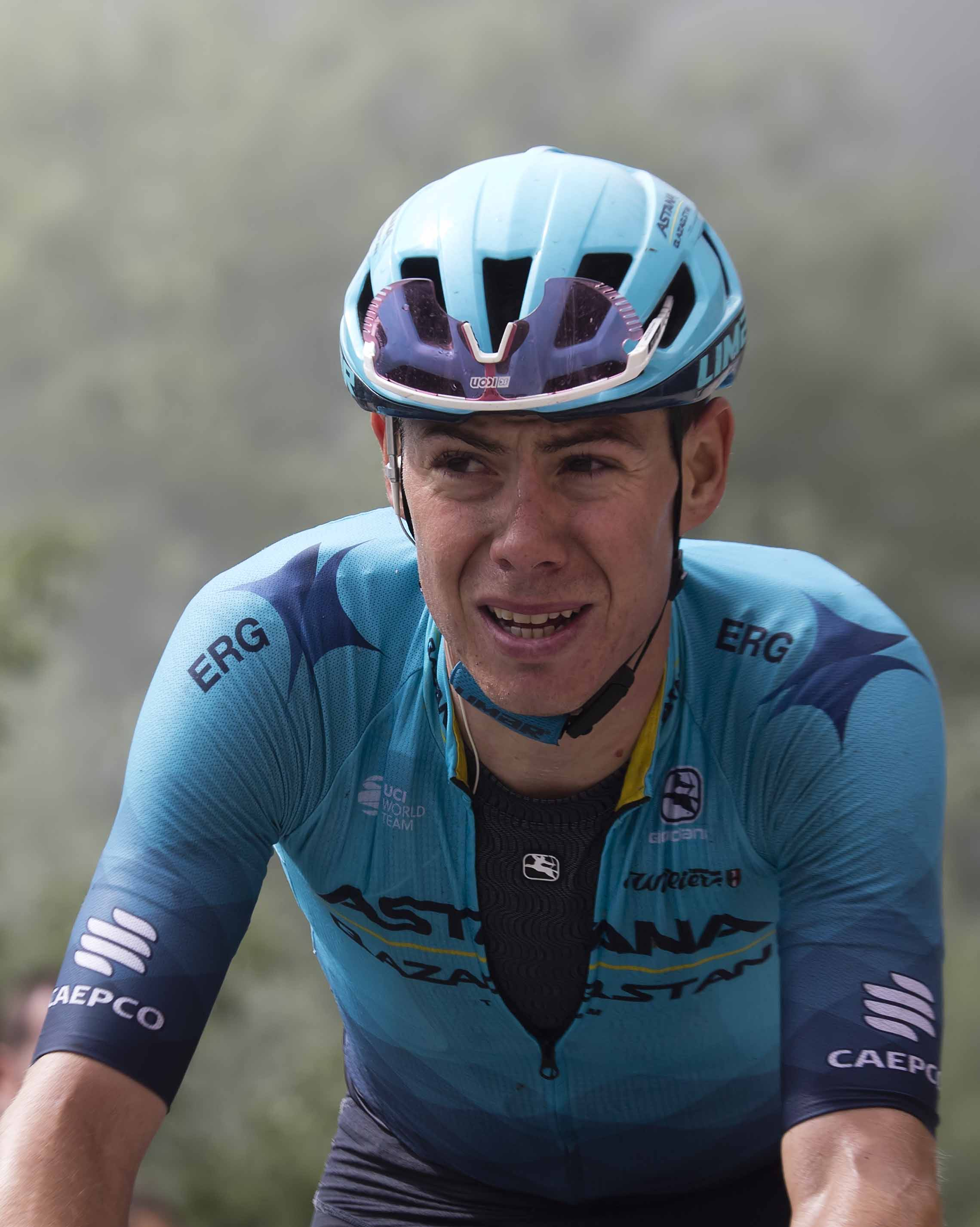
- De la Cruz in 2022

Personal information
- Full name: David de la Cruz Melgarejo
- Nickname: Mazoman
- Born: 6 May 1989 (age 37) Sabadell, Spain
- Height: 1.81 m (5 ft 11 in)
- Weight: 64 kg (141 lb; 10.1 st)

Cycling career
- Sport: Cycling
- Current team: Pinarello–Q36.5 Pro Cycling Team
- Discipline: Road
- Role: Rider
- Rider type: Climber

Professional teams
- 2010–2012: Caja Rural
- 2013–2014: NetApp–Endura
- 2015–2017: Etixx–Quick-Step
- 2018–2019: Team Sky
- 2020–2021: UAE Team Emirates
- 2022–2023: Astana Qazaqstan Team
- 2024–: Q36.5 Pro Cycling Team

Major wins
- Grand Tours Vuelta a España 1 individual stage (2016) One-day races and Classics National Time Trial Championships (2024)

David de la Cruz Melgarejo (born 6 May 1989) is a Spanish cyclist, who currently rides for UCI ProTeam Pinarello–Q36.5 Pro Cycling Team.

== Career ==
De la Cruz was born in Sabadell. On 28 August 2016, de la Cruz scored the biggest win of his career to that point, when he won stage 9 of the Vuelta a España from a breakaway and took over the general and combination classification jerseys. He went on to finish the race in seventh place overall. For these accomplishments he was voted as the best sportsperson of his hometown, Sabadell, in 2016. In the 2020 Vuelta a España he again finished the race in seventh place overall, and also finished seventh in 2021.

In October 2021, de la Cruz signed a two-year contract with the Astana Qazaqstan Team, from the 2022 season.

== Major results ==
2009
9th Overall Vuelta Ciclista a León
2010
9th Overall Vuelta Ciclista a León
2011
2nd Toscana-Terra di Ciclismo
2012
2nd Overall Vuelta a Asturias
4th Overall Vuelta a Castilla y León
5th Overall Volta a Portugal

1st Young rider classification

9th Overall Vuelta a la Comunidad de Madrid
2014
10th Overall Tour of California
2016 (1 pro win)
7th Overall Vuelta a España

1st Stage 9
Held & after Stage 9

2017 (2)
1st Stage 8 Paris–Nice
3rd Overall Vuelta a Burgos
4th Overall Tour of the Basque Country

1st Stage 3

7th Overall Volta a la Comunitat Valenciana
2018 (2)
1st Stage 5 (ITT) Vuelta a Andalucía
3rd Overall Vuelta a Burgos
9th Overall Paris–Nice

1st Stage 8

9th Overall Tour of the Basque Country
2019
5th Overall Settimana Internazionale di Coppi e Bartali
8th Overall Tour of Guangxi
8th Overall Vuelta a Burgos
Combativity award Stage 8 Vuelta a España
2020
1st Mountains classification, Critérium du Dauphiné
7th Overall Vuelta a España
8th Overall Vuelta a Burgos
2021
2nd Time trial, National Road Championships
4th Overall Tour de Luxembourg
5th Overall Vuelta a Burgos
7th Overall Vuelta a España
2022
10th Overall UAE Tour
10th Overall Volta a la Comunitat Valenciana
2023
8th Overall O Gran Camiño
2024 (1)
1st Time trial, National Road Championships
2025
2nd Time trial, National Road Championships
2nd Overall Giro d'Abruzzo
2nd Overall Sibiu Cycling Tour
8th Overall Tirreno–Adriatico
2026
4th Time trial, National Road Championships

=== Grand Tour general classification results timeline ===
| Grand Tour | 2013 | 2014 | 2015 | 2016 | 2017 | 2018 | 2019 | 2020 | 2021 | 2022 | 2023 |
|---|---|---|---|---|---|---|---|---|---|---|---|
| Giro d'Italia | — | — | 34 | DNF | — | 56 | — | — | — | DNF | — |
| Tour de France | — | DNF | — | — | — | — | — | 72 | — | — | DNF |
| Vuelta a España | DNF | — | DNF | 7 | DNF | 15 | 66 | 7 | 7 | 21 | DNF |

Legend
| — | Did not compete |
| DNF | Did not finish |
| IP | In progress |
