= Tour Colombia =

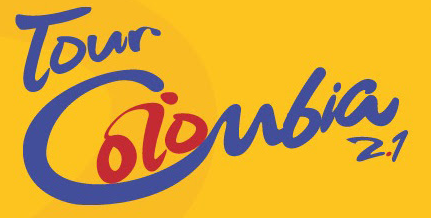

Race details
- Date: February
- Region: Colombia
- Discipline: Road
- Competition: UCI America Tour
- Type: Stage race
- Web site: tourcolombiauci.com

History
- First edition: 2018
- Editions: 4 (as of 2024)
- First winner: Egan Bernal (COL)
- Most wins: No repeat winners
- Most recent: Rodrigo Contreras (COL)

The Tour Colombia, called earlier Colombia Oro y Paz is a multi-day professional cycling race held annually in Colombia since 2018. It is on the UCI America Tour calendar as a category 2.1 event.

== Winners ==
| Year | Country | Rider | Team |
|---|---|---|---|
| 2018 | Colombia | Egan Bernal | Team Sky |
| 2019 | Colombia | Miguel Ángel López | Astana |
| 2020 | Colombia | Sergio Higuita | EF Pro Cycling |
| 2021–2023 | No race | | |
| 2024 | Colombia | Rodrigo Contreras | Nu Colombia |
| 2025–2026 | No race | | |

== See also ==
- Vuelta a Colombia
- Vuelta a Colombia Femenina Oro y Paz
