= Kenny Elissonde =

French road cyclist

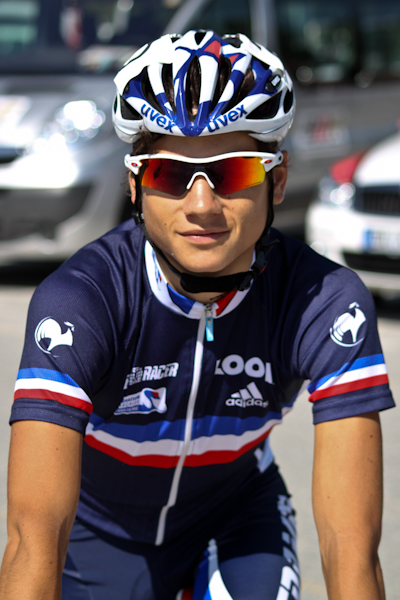
- Elissonde at the 2011 Giro della Valle d'Aosta

Personal information
- Full name: Kenny Elissonde
- Nickname: King Kenny
- Born: 22 July 1991 (age 35) Longjumeau, France
- Height: 1.69 m (5 ft 6 1/2 in)
- Weight: 52 kg (115 lb)

Cycling career
- Sport: Cycling
- Current team: Retired
- Discipline: Road
- Role: Rider
- Rider type: Climber

Amateur teams
- 2010–2011: CC Etupes
- 2011: FDJ (stagiaire)

Professional teams
- 2012–2016: FDJ–BigMat
- 2017–2019: Team Sky
- 2020–2023: Trek–Segafredo
- 2024: Cofidis

Major wins
- Grand Tours Vuelta a España 1 individual stage (2013)

Kenny Elissonde (born 22 July 1991) is a French former professional road cyclist, who competed as a professional from 2012 to 2024.

== Career ==
Elissonde is a climbing specialist, having won the prestigious stage up the Alto de l'Angliru at the 2013 Vuelta a España.

In September 2016, it was announced that Elissonde would join Team Sky, from FDJ, for the 2017 season on an initial 2-year deal. He was the first French rider to be a member of the team since Nicolas Portal was part of the inaugural squad back in 2010. In August 2020, he was named in the startlist for the Tour de France.

In 2021, he earned the combativity award for his efforts on stage eleven of the Tour de France. During the Vuelta a España he was involved in a successful breakaway on stage three, where he finished third; two days later, he moved into the overall race lead for a day.

== Major results ==
2008
1st Road race, National Junior Road Championships
2009
8th Overall Tour du Valromey

1st Mountains classification
1st Stages 1 & 3

2010
7th Overall Giro della Valle d'Aosta Mont Blanc
2011
1st Overall Ronde de l'Isard

1st Stage 2

7th Liège–Bastogne–Liège Espoirs
2012
Paris–Corrèze

1st Points classification
1st Stage 2

4th Overall Route du Sud
2013
1st Stage 20 Vuelta a España
7th Overall Tour de l'Ain

1st Young rider classification

7th Boucles de l'Aulne
8th Overall Tour of Oman

1st Young rider classification

2014
7th Overall Route du Sud
2015
7th Tre Valli Varesine
2016
Vuelta a España

Held after Stages 14–19

2017
3rd Overall Herald Sun Tour
3rd Overall Route du Sud
2018
3rd Overall Route d'Occitanie
10th Overall Vuelta a Burgos
2019
7th Overall Herald Sun Tour
2020
7th Mont Ventoux Dénivelé Challenge
2021
6th Mont Ventoux Dénivelé Challenge
Vuelta a España

Held after Stage 5

Combativity award Stage 11 Tour de France
2022
5th Overall Giro di Sicilia
10th Overall Vuelta a Burgos
2023
2nd Overall Tour de l'Ain

Combativity award Overall

=== Grand Tour general classification results timeline ===
Grand Tour	2013	2014	2015	2016	2017	2018	2019	2020	2021	2022	2023	2024
Giro d'Italia	—	—	46	—	DNF	51	—	—	—	—	—	—
Tour de France	—	—	—	—	—	—	—	25	36	—	—	—
Vuelta a España	33	DNF	16	20	—	—	—	DNF	DNF	64	50	DNF

Legend
—	Did not compete
DNF	Did not finish
