= Jon Aberasturi =

Basque bicycle racer

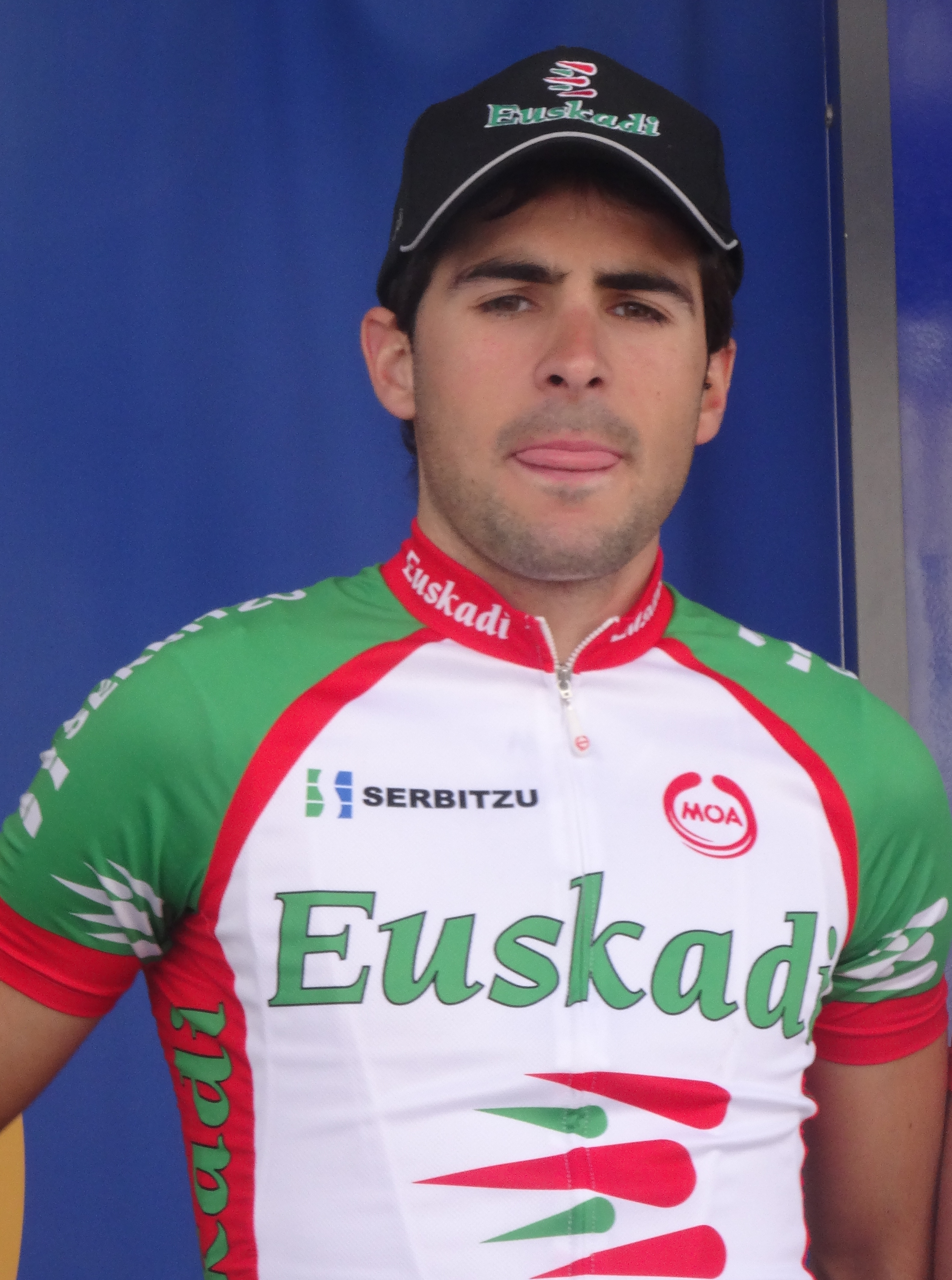
- Aberasturi in 2014

Personal information
- Full name: Jon Aberasturi Izaga
- Born: 28 March 1989 (age 37) Vitoria-Gasteiz, Basque Autonomous Community, Spain
- Height: 1.73 m (5 ft 8 in)
- Weight: 69 kg (152 lb)

Cycling career
- Sport: Cycling
- Current team: Euskaltel–Euskadi
- Discipline: Road
- Role: Rider
- Rider type: Sprinter

Amateur teams
- 2008–2009: Naturgas Energía
- 2015: Dym Jess Tlaxcala

Professional teams
- 2010–2012: Orbea
- 2013: Euskaltel–Euskadi
- 2014: Euskadi
- 2016–2017: Team UKYO
- 2018: Euskadi–Murias
- 2019–2021: Caja Rural–Seguros RGA
- 2022–2023: Trek–Segafredo
- 2024–: Euskaltel–Euskadi

Jon Aberasturi Izaga (born 28 March 1989) is a Basque cyclist, who currently rides for UCI ProTeam Euskaltel–Euskadi.

== Career ==
Following a very successful 2017 season where he took 7 professional victories he had trouble finding a contract and even considered retirement. Included in those wins is Stage 1 of the 2.HC rated Tour of Qinghai Lake. He ended up signing for UCI Professional Continental team Euskadi–Murias. In August 2018, he was named in the startlist for the Vuelta a España. He was disqualified from the 2021 Tour de Luxembourg for using the 'Super-Tuck'. The 'Super-Tuck' is a position on the bike which was banned by the UCI who deemed it dangerous. Aberasturi was fined 500 Swiss francs and lost 15 UCI points for the season. Aberasturi signed with Euskaltel–Euskadi for the 2024 season. He had previously rode for the team in 2017 and was supported by the Euskaltel Foundation throughout his youth.

== Major results ==
2011
3rd Overall Grande Prémio Crédito Agrícola da Costa Azul

1st Stage 1

2012
4th Overall Volta ao Alentejo
8th Trofeo Migjorn
2013
8th Paris–Tours
2014
5th Overall Tour de Gironde

1st Stage 1 (TTT)

6th Trofeo Palma
10th Vuelta a La Rioja
2016
1st Points classification, Tour de Kumano
1st Stage 1 Tour de Korea
1st Stage 1 Tour de Hokkaido
3rd UAE Cup
10th Overall Tour of Sharjah
2017
Tour of Thailand

1st Points classification
1st Stage 3

Tour of Qinghai Lake

1st Stages 1 & 5

Tour de Korea

1st Stages 1 & 4

1st Stage 4 Tour of Japan
1st Stage 5 Tour of Taihu Lake
1st Stage 1 Tour of Hainan
2018
Vuelta a Aragón

1st Points classification
1st Stage 1

3rd Circuito de Getxo
6th Paris–Bourges
7th Clássica da Arrábida
10th Clásica de Almería
2019
1st Circuito de Getxo
Boucles de la Mayenne

1st Points classification
1st Stage 2

1st Stage 2 Vuelta a Burgos
10th Gran Premio Bruno Beghelli
2020
1st Stage 1 Tour de Hongrie
3rd Trofeo Campos, Porreres, Felanitx, Ses Salines
4th Circuito de Getxo
8th Trofeo Playa de Palma
2021
1st Stage 3 Tour of Slovenia
2nd Cholet-Pays de la Loire
4th Clásica de Almería
4th Per sempre Alfredo
2022
8th Kampioenschap van Vlaanderen
9th Road race, UEC European Road Championships
2023
9th Milano–Torino
2024
6th Vuelta a Castilla y León
8th Grand Prix de Fourmies
2025
10th Classique Dunkerque

=== Grand Tour general classification results timeline ===
Grand Tour	2018	2019	2020	2021	2022	2023	2024
Giro d'Italia	—	—	—	—	—	—	—
Tour de France	—	—	—	—	—	—	—
Vuelta a España	146	140	117	132	—	—	DNF

Legend
—	Did not compete
DNF	Did not finish
