= Denmark at the UCI Road World Championships =

- IOC code: DEN
- Medals: Gold 19 Silver 19 Bronze 17 Total 55

Denmark at the UCI Road World Championships is an overview of the Danish results at the UCI Road World Championships. The Danish competitors are selected by coaches of the Danish Cycling Federation. Denmark was one of the founding nations of the World Championships, and were the hosts of the first edition ever, the 1921 UCI Road World Championships in Copenhagen. This event only consisted of one race, the men's amateur road race, in which the Danes also won their first ever medal at the World Championships, a silver medal for Willum Nielsen. Since then, Denmark has won a total of 55 medals at the World Championships, including 19 gold medals. Many of these have been won at home soil in Copenhagen, where six editions of the World Championships have been held (1921, 1931, 1937, 1949, 1956 and 2011).

== List of medalists ==
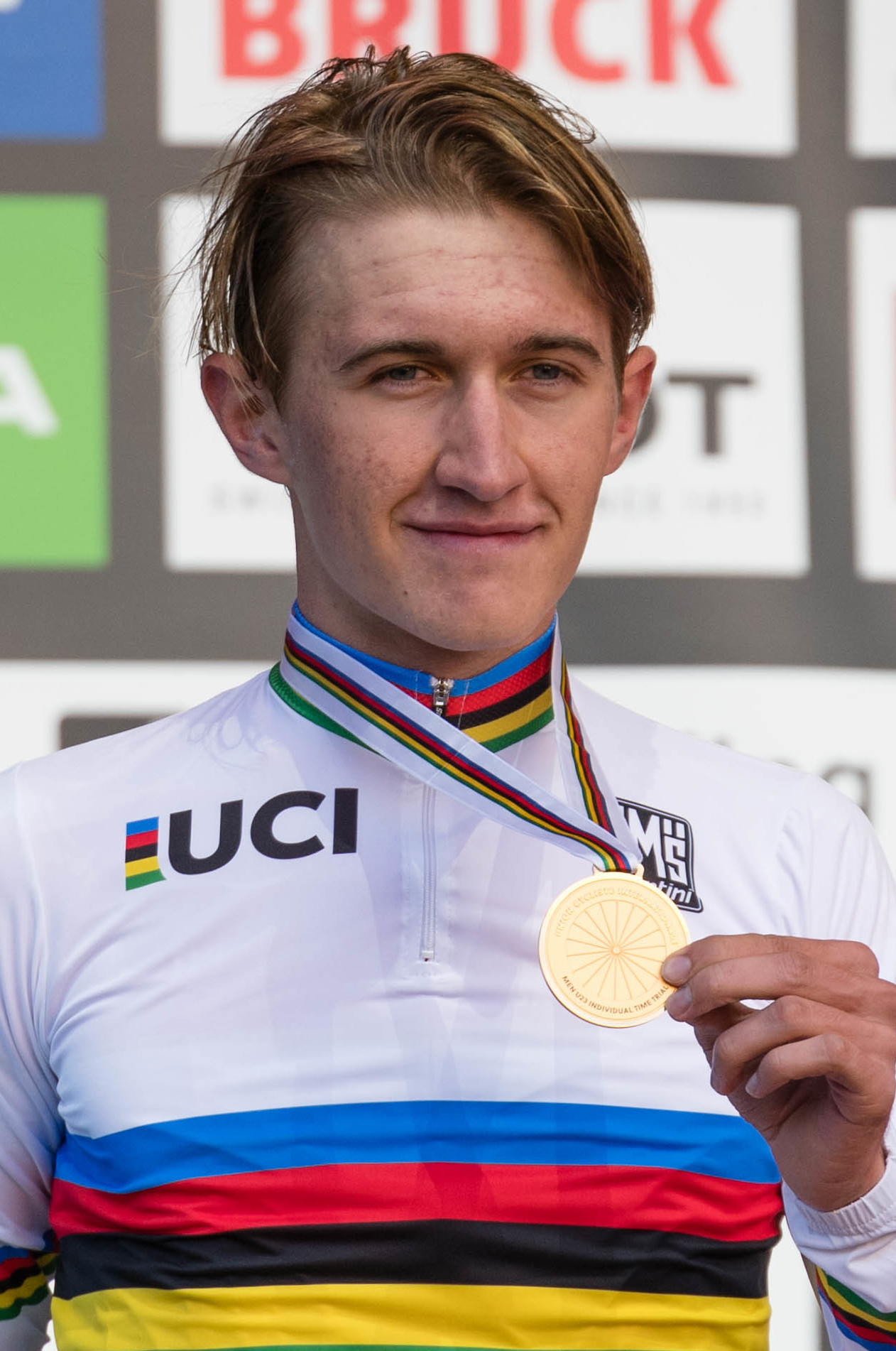
Mikkel Bjerg, a record three time under-23 time trial world champion, following his win in 2018.

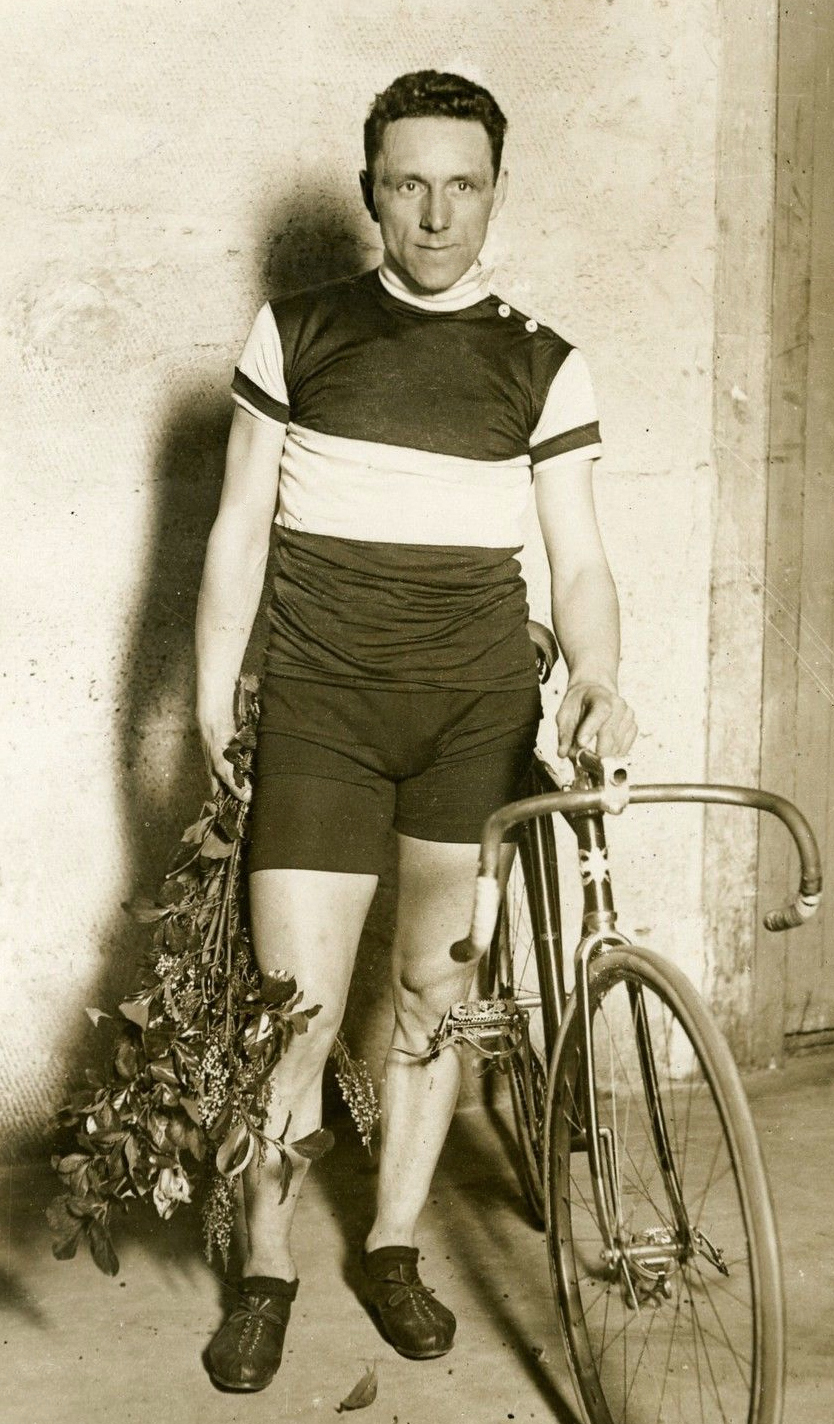
Henry Hansen, winner of the 1931 men's amateur road race, and Denmark's first ever UCI Road World Champion.

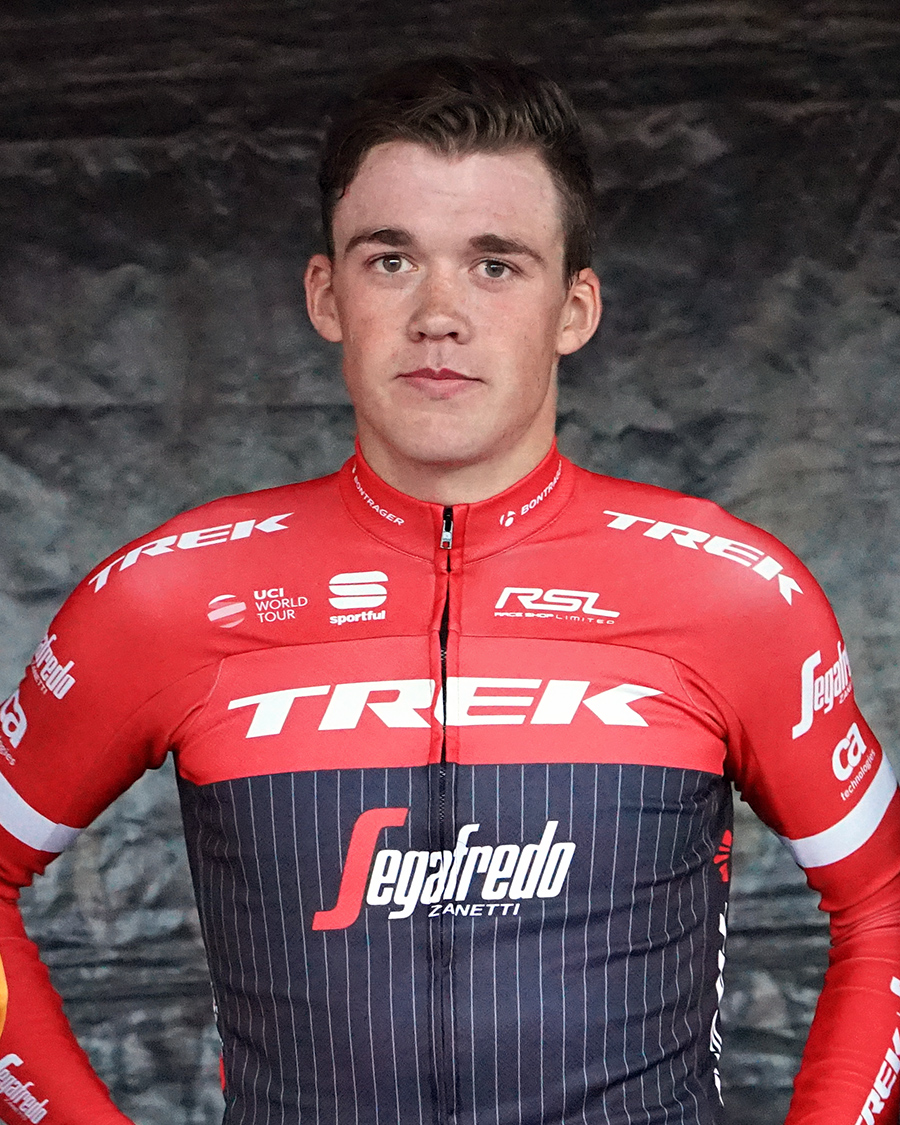
Mads Pedersen, the only Danish winner of the men's professional road race.

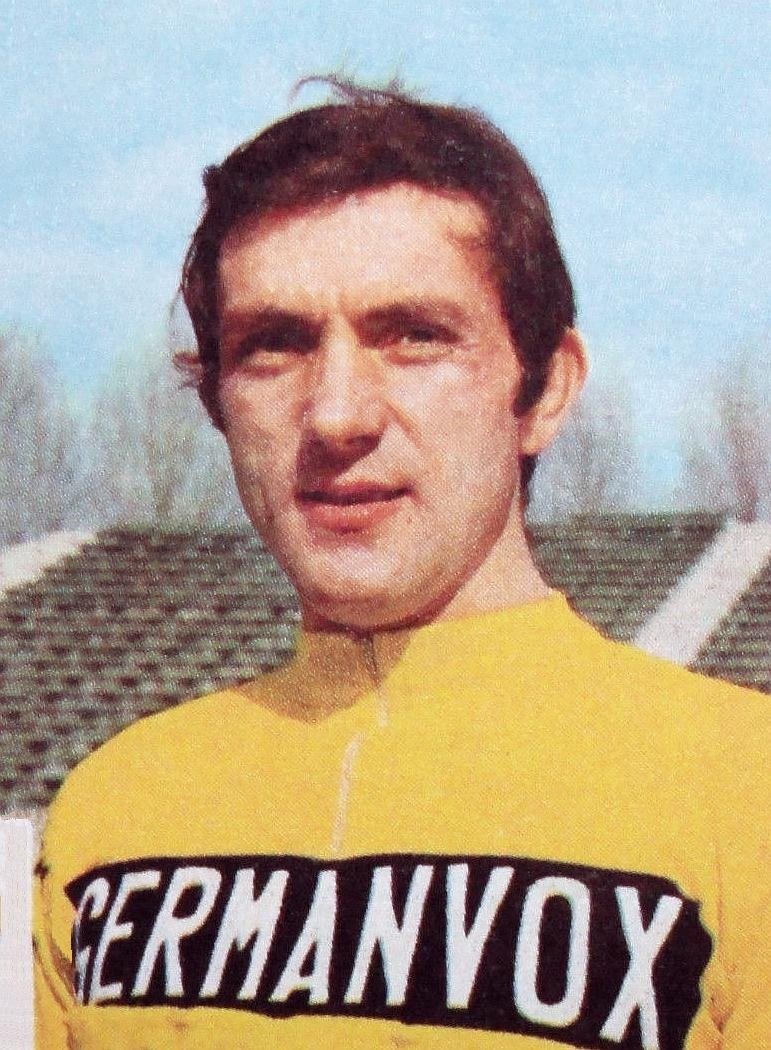
Ole Ritter, silver medalist at the 1962 men's amateur road race.

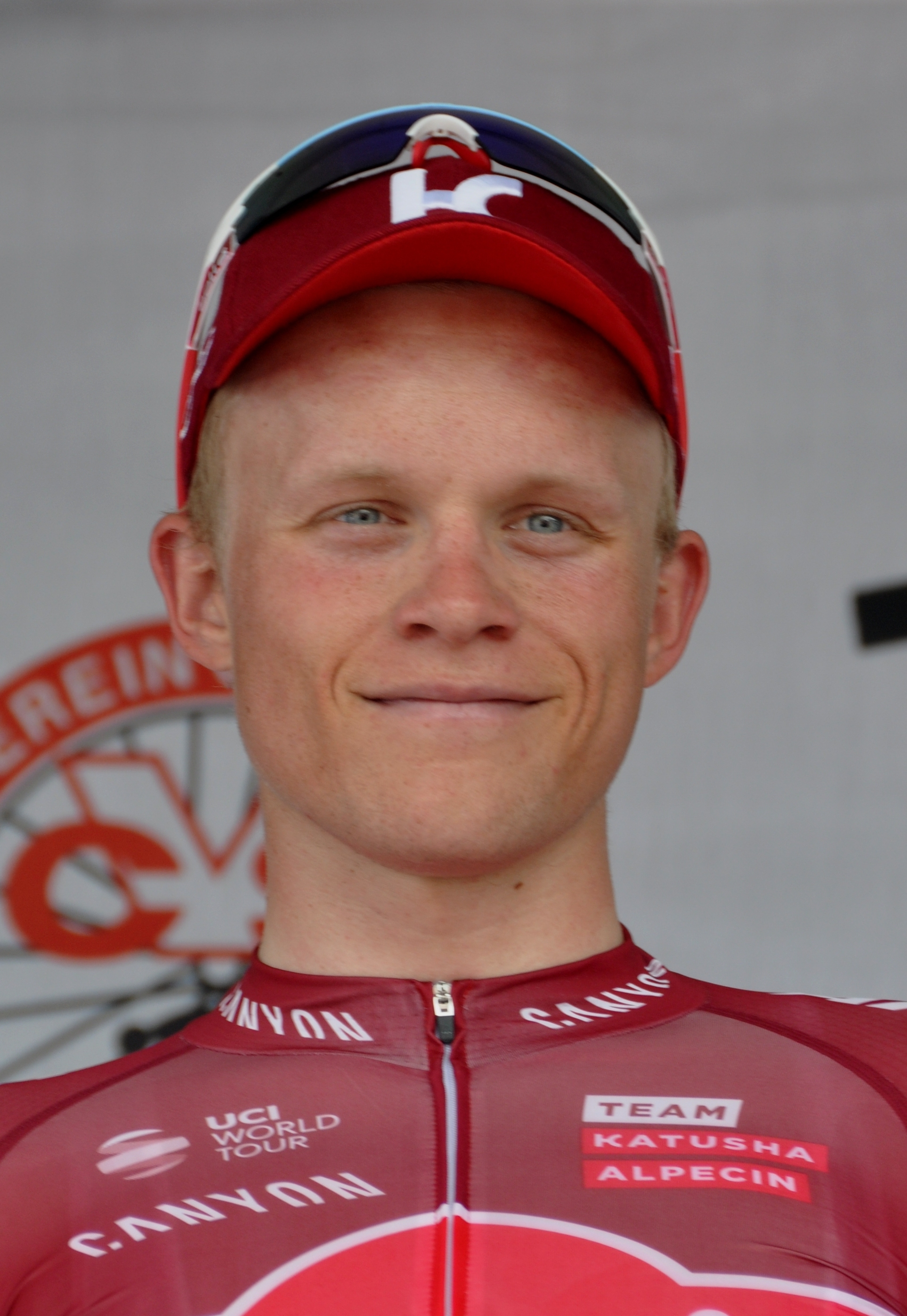
Mads Würtz Schmidt, two time UCI Road World Champion (2011 junior time trial and 2015 under-23 time trial.)

This is a list of all Danish medals (including elite, amateur, under-23 and junior races).

Medal	Championship	Name	Event
Silver	(Denmark) 1921 Copenhagen	Willum Nielsen (DEN)	Men's amateur road race
Bronze	(Belgium) 1930 Liège	Rudolph Risch (DEN)	Men's amateur road race
Gold	(Denmark) 1931 Copenhagen	Henry Hansen (DEN)	Men's amateur road race
Bronze	(Denmark) 1931 Copenhagen	Leo Nielsen (DEN)	Men's amateur road race
Bronze	(Belgium) 1935 Floreffe	Werner Grundahl Hansen (DEN)	Men's amateur road race
Silver	(Denmark) 1937 Copenhagen	Frode Sørensen (DEN)	Men's amateur road race
Silver	(Germany) 1954 Solingen	Hans Andresen (DEN)	Men's amateur road race
Silver	(Italy) 1962 Salò	Ole Ritter (DEN)	Men's amateur road race
Silver	(Italy) 1962 Salò	Denmark (DEN)	Men's team time trial
Gold	(Germany) 1966 Nürburgring	Denmark (DEN)	Men's team time trial
Bronze	(Germany) 1966 Nürburgring	Willy Skibby (DEN)	Men's amateur road race
Silver	(Netherlands) 1967 Heerlen	Denmark (DEN)	Men's team time trial
Gold	(Belgium) 1969 Zolder	Leif Mortensen (DEN)	Men's amateur road race
Silver	(Belgium) 1969 Zolder	Denmark (DEN)	Men's team time trial
Gold	(United Kingdom) 1970 Leicester	Jørgen Schmidt (DEN)	Men's amateur road race
Silver	(United Kingdom) 1970 Leicester	Leif Mortensen (DEN)	Men's road race
Bronze	(Germany) 1978 Nürburg	Jørgen Marcussen (DEN)	Men's road race
Silver	(Italy) 1985 Giavera del Montello	Johnny Weltz (DEN)	Men's amateur road race
Bronze	(Austria) 1987 Villach	Alex Pedersen (DEN)	Men's amateur road race
Gold	(Italy) 1994 Agrigento	Alex Pedersen (DEN)	Men's amateur road race
Silver	(Spain) 1997 San Sebastián	Bo Hamburger (DEN)	Men's road race
Silver	(Canada) 2003 Hamilton	Anders Lund (DEN)	Men's junior road race
Bronze	(Italy) 2004 Verona	Mads Christensen (DEN)	Men's under-23 road race
Bronze	(Italy) 2008 Varese	Matti Breschel (DEN)	Men's road race
Bronze	(Switzerland) 2009 Mendrisio	Linda Villumsen (DEN)	Women's time trial
Silver	(Australia) 2010 Geelong	Matti Breschel (DEN)	Men's road race
Gold	(Denmark) 2011 Copenhagen	Mads Würtz Schmidt (DEN)	Men's junior time trial
Silver	(Denmark) 2011 Copenhagen	Rasmus Quaade (DEN)	Men's under-23 time trial
Bronze	(Denmark) 2011 Copenhagen	Christina Siggaard (DEN)	Women's junior road race
Silver	(Netherlands) 2012 Valkenburg	Cecilie Uttrup Ludwig (DEN)	Women's junior time trial
Gold	(Italy) 2013 Tuscany	Amalie Dideriksen (DEN)	Women's junior road race
Silver	(Italy) 2013 Tuscany	Mads Pedersen (DEN)	Men's junior road race
Silver	(Italy) 2013 Tuscany	Mathias Krigbaum (DEN)	Men's junior time trial
Bronze	(Italy) 2013 Tuscany	Lasse Norman Hansen (DEN)	Men's under-23 time trial
Gold	(Spain) 2014 Ponferrada	Amalie Dideriksen (DEN)	Women's junior road race
Silver	(Spain) 2014 Ponferrada	Pernille Mathiesen (DEN)	Women's junior time trial
Gold	(United States) 2015 Richmond	Mads Würtz Schmidt (DEN)	Men's under-23 time trial
Bronze	(United States) 2015 Richmond	Rasmus Pedersen (DEN)	Men's junior time trial
Gold	(Qatar) 2016 Doha	Jakob Egholm (DEN)	Men's junior road race
Gold	(Qatar) 2016 Doha	Amalie Dideriksen (DEN)	Women's road race
Silver	(Qatar) 2016 Doha	Mikkel Bjerg (DEN)	Men's junior time trial
Gold	(Norway) 2017 Bergen	Mikkel Bjerg (DEN)	Men's under-23 time trial
Gold	(Norway) 2017 Bergen	Julius Johansen (DEN)	Men's junior road race
Silver	(Norway) 2017 Bergen	Emma Norsgaard (DEN)	Women's junior road race
Bronze	(Norway) 2017 Bergen	Michael Carbel (DEN)	Men's under-23 road race
Bronze	(Norway) 2017 Bergen	Amalie Dideriksen (DEN)	Women's road race
Gold	(Austria) 2018 Innsbruck	Mikkel Bjerg (DEN)	Men's under-23 time trial
Bronze	(Austria) 2018 Innsbruck	Mathias Norsgaard (DEN)	Men's under-23 time trial
Gold	(United Kingdom) 2019 Harrogate	Mads Pedersen (DEN)	Men's road race
Gold	(United Kingdom) 2019 Harrogate	Mikkel Bjerg (DEN)	Men's under-23 time trial
Gold	(Belgium) 2021 Flanders	Johan Price-Pejtersen (DEN)	Men's under-23 time trial
Gold	(Belgium) 2021 Flanders	Gustav Wang (DEN)	Men's junior time trial
Bronze	(Belgium) 2021 Flanders	Michael Valgren (DEN)	Men's road race
Gold	(United Kingdom) 2023 Glasgow	Albert Philipsen (DEN)	Men's junior road race
Bronze	(United Kingdom) 2023 Glasgow	Cecilie Uttrup (DEN)	Women's road race

=== Medals by discipline ===
Updated following 2021 UCI Road World Championships

Event	Gold	Silver	Bronze	Total	Rank
Men's (professional) road race	1	3	3	7	
Men's amateur road race	4	5	5	14	
Men's time trial	0	0	0	0	
Men's team time trial	1	3	0	4	
100 km mountains race	0	0	0	0	
Women's road race	1	0	2	3	
Women's time trial	0	0	1	1	
Women's team time trial	0	0	0	0	
Men's under-23 road race	0	0	2	2	
Men's under-23 time trial	5	1	2	9	
Men's junior road race	3	2	0	5	
Men's junior time trial	3	2	1	6	
Women's junior road race	1	1	1	4	
Women's junior time trial	0	2	0	2	
Total	18	19	16	53	
