= 2018 UCI Road World Championships – Men's under-23 road race =

Men's under-23 road race
2018 UCI Road World Championships
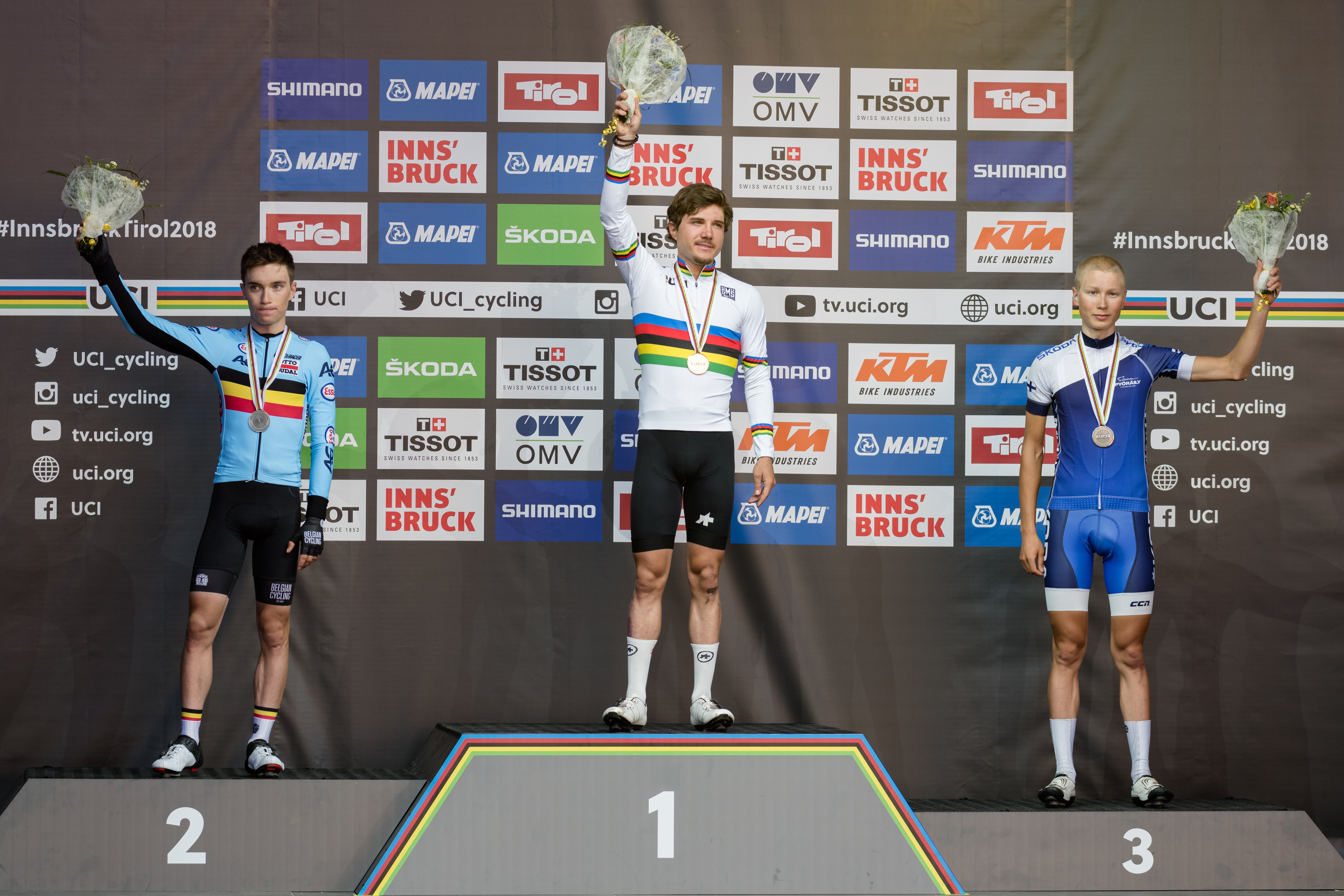
- The final podium (from left to right): Bjorg Lambrecht (Belgium), Marc Hirschi (Switzerland) and Jaakko Hänninen (Finland).

Race details
- Dates: 28 September 2018
- Stages: 1
- Distance: 179.5 km (111.5 mi)
- Winning time: 4h 24' 05"

Medalists
	Gold	(Switzerland) Marc Hirschi (SUI)
	Silver	(Belgium) Bjorg Lambrecht (BEL)
	Bronze	(Finland) Jaakko Hänninen (FIN)

The Men's under-23 road race of the 2018 UCI Road World Championships was a cycling event that took place on 28 September 2018 in Innsbruck, Austria. It was the 23rd edition of the event, for which French rider Benoît Cosnefroy was the defending champion, having won in 2017. 178 riders from 52 nations entered the competition.

The race was won by Switzerland's Marc Hirschi – becoming the first Swiss rider to win the gold medal – after he attacked from a small group on the final descent into Innsbruck, and soloed away to a fifteen-second margin of victory. The remaining members of that small group, Bjorg Lambrecht from Belgium and Finland's Jaakko Hänninen, did battle for the remaining medals, with silver going to Lambrecht and bronze to Hänninen.

== Course ==
The race started in Kufstein and headed south-west towards Innsbruck with a primarily rolling route, except for a climb of 5 kilometres (3.1 miles) between Fritzens and Gnadenwald – as had been in the time trial events earlier in the week – with an average 7.1% gradient and maximum of 14% in places. After 84.2 kilometres (52.3 miles), the riders crossed the finish line for the first time, before starting four laps of a circuit 23.8 kilometres (14.8 miles) in length. The circuit contained a climb of 7.9 kilometres (4.9 miles), at an average gradient of 5.9% but reaching 10% in places, from the outskirts of Innsbruck through Aldrans and Lans towards Igls. After a short period of flat roads, the race descended through Igls back towards Innsbruck and the finish line in front of the Tyrolean State Theatre.

== Qualification ==
Qualification was based mainly on the UCI Under-23 Continental Rankings by nations as of 12 August 2018, with varying number on qualifications depending on the continent. In addition to this number, any rider within the top placings of the continent's elite tour ranking that was not already qualified, the outgoing World Champion and the current continental champions were also able to take part.

=== Qualification methods ===
The following nations qualified.

Tour	Criterium	Rank	No. of riders to start	Nations
UCI Africa Tour	Under-23 Ranking by Nations	1st	5	Rwanda
UCI Africa Tour	Under-23 Ranking by Nations	2nd	4	Morocco
UCI Africa Tour	Under-23 Ranking by Nations	3–5	3	Algeria; South Africa; Eritrea
UCI America Tour	Under-23 Ranking by Nations	1–3	5	Colombia; Ecuador; United States
UCI America Tour	Under-23 Ranking by Nations	4–6	4	Mexico; Costa Rica; Canada
UCI America Tour	Under-23 Ranking by Nations	7–10	3	Argentina; Brazil; Chile; Venezuela
UCI Asia Tour	Under-23 Ranking by Nations	1–2	5	Kazakhstan; Japan
UCI Asia Tour	Under-23 Ranking by Nations	3–4	4	Hong Kong; Mongolia
UCI Asia Tour	Under-23 Ranking by Nations	5–7	3	South Korea; Singapore; Iran
UCI Europe Tour	Under-23 Ranking by Nations	1–15	5	Netherlands; Belgium; Denmark; France; Italy; Norway; Germany; Switzerland; Ireland; Slovenia; Great Britain; Turkey; Poland; Spain; Croatia
UCI Europe Tour	Under-23 Ranking by Nations	16–20	4	Luxembourg; Russia; Ukraine; Portugal; Serbia
UCI Europe Tour	Under-23 Ranking by Nations	21–27	3	Czech Republic; Sweden; Hungary; Israel; Azerbaijan; Austria; Romania
UCI Oceania Tour	Under-23 Ranking by Nations	1st	5	Australia
UCI Oceania Tour	Under-23 Ranking by Nations	2nd	3	New Zealand

=== Continental champions ===
Name	Country	Reason
Masaki Yamamoto	Japan	Asian Champion
Marc Hirschi	Switzerland	European Champion
Federico Vivas	Argentina	Pan American Champion

=== Participating nations ===
178 cyclists from 52 nations were entered in the men's road race. The number of cyclists per nation is shown in parentheses.

- Australia (5)
- Austria (4)
- Azerbaijan (2)
- Belgium (5)
- Bolivia (2)
- Brazil (1)
- Burkina Faso (1)
- Canada (4)
- Chile (3)
- Colombia (5)
- Costa Rica (1)
- Croatia (4)
- Cyprus (1)
- Czech Republic (3)
- Denmark (5)
- Ecuador (5)
- Eritrea (3)
- Ethiopia (1)
- Finland (1)
- France (6)
- Germany (6)
- Great Britain (5)
- Hong Kong (3)
- Hungary (3)
- Ireland (5)
- Israel (1)
- Italy (6)
- Japan (5)
- Kazakhstan (3)
- Luxembourg (4)
- North Macedonia (1)
- Mexico (3)
- Mongolia (2)
- Morocco (2)
- Netherlands (5)
- New Zealand (3)
- Norway (5)
- Poland (5)
- Portugal (4)
- Romania (2)
- Russia (4)
- Rwanda (5)
- Serbia (2)
- Slovakia (1)
- Slovenia (6)
- South Africa (2)
- Spain (5)
- Sweden (3)
- Switzerland (6)
- Trinidad and Tobago (1)
- Ukraine (3)
- United States (5)

== Final classification ==
Of the race's 178 entrants, 90 riders completed the full distance of 179.5 kilometres (111.5 miles).

Rank	Rider	Country	Time
1	Marc Hirschi	Switzerland	4h 24' 05"
2	Bjorg Lambrecht	Belgium	+ 15"
3	Jaakko Hänninen	Finland	+ 15"
4	Gino Mäder	Switzerland	+ 35"
5	Mark Padun	Ukraine	+ 37"
6	Jaime Castrillo	Spain	+ 45"
7	Tadej Pogačar	Slovenia	+ 47"
8	Ethan Hayter	Great Britain	+ 47"
9	Patrick Müller	Switzerland	+ 47"
10	James Shaw	Great Britain	+ 47"
11	Jai Hindley	Australia	+ 47"
12	Clément Champoussin	France	+ 47"
13	Aurélien Paret-Peintre	France	+ 1' 06"
14	Georg Zimmermann	Germany	+ 1' 06"
15	Aleksandr Vlasov	Russia	+ 1' 07"
16	Samuele Battistella	Italy	+ 1' 07"
17	Robert Stannard	Australia	+ 2' 48"
18	Stefan de Bod	South Africa	+ 3' 21"
19	Alessandro Fedeli	Italy	+ 3' 21"
20	Eddie Dunbar	Ireland	+ 3' 23"
21	Mikkel Frølich Honoré	Denmark	+ 3' 46"
22	Tobias Foss	Norway	+ 3' 46"
23	Lennard Kämna	Germany	+ 3' 50"
24	Andrea Bagioli	Italy	+ 3' 50"
25	Neilson Powless	United States	+ 4' 28"
26	Mark Donovan	Great Britain	+ 4' 45"
27	Valentin Madouas	France	+ 4' 57"
28	Marcel Neuhauser	Austria	+ 4' 57"
29	Max Kanter	Germany	+ 5' 41"
30	Pascal Eenkhoorn	Netherlands	+ 5' 41"
31	Barnabás Peák	Hungary	+ 5' 41"
32	Wilmar Paredes	Colombia	+ 5' 41"
33	Viktor Verschaeve	Belgium	+ 5' 41"
34	Adam Ťoupalík	Czech Republic	+ 5' 41"
35	Nikolay Cherkasov	Russia	+ 5' 41"
36	Ibai Azurmendi	Spain	+ 5' 41"
37	Mikkel Bjerg	Denmark	+ 5' 41"
38	Gonçalo Carvalho	Portugal	+ 5' 41"
39	Jaka Primožič	Slovenia	+ 5' 41"
40	Hafetab Weldu	Ethiopia	+ 5' 41"
41	José Félix Parra	Spain	+ 5' 41"
42	Sean Bennett	United States	+ 5' 41"
43	Thymen Arensman	Netherlands	+ 5' 45"
44	Jonas Gregaard	Denmark	+ 5' 48"
45	Steff Cras	Belgium	+ 5' 53"
46	Lucas Eriksson	Sweden	+ 7' 57"
47	Roger Adrià	Spain	+ 8' 35"
48	Miguel Flórez	Colombia	+ 8' 35"
49	Jefferson Alexander Cepeda	Ecuador	+ 8' 35"
50	Joel Fuertes	Ecuador	+ 8' 35"
51	André Carvalho	Portugal	+ 9' 27"
52	Michael Storer	Australia	+ 9' 27"
53	Alessandro Monaco	Italy	+ 9' 27"
54	Einer Rubio	Colombia	+ 9' 27"
55	Nicolas Prodhomme	France	+ 9' 54"
56	Lukas Rüegg	Switzerland	+ 9' 54"
57	Kamil Małecki	Poland	+ 10' 47"
58	Dimitri Bussard	Switzerland	+ 10' 47"
59	Torjus Sleen	Norway	+ 10' 47"
60	Jakub Otruba	Czech Republic	+ 10' 47"
61	Andreas Leknessund	Norway	+ 10' 47"
62	Florian Stork	Germany	+ 10' 47"
63	Felix Gall	Austria	+ 10' 47"
64	Jonas Vingegaard	Denmark	+ 10' 49"
65	Attila Valter	Hungary	+ 11' 52"
66	Luis Villalobos	Mexico	+ 11' 52"
67	Kevin Geniets	Luxembourg	+ 11' 52"
68	Benjamin Brkic	Austria	+ 14' 08"
69	Stephen Williams	Great Britain	+ 16' 25"
70	Alessandro Covi	Italy	+ 16' 29"
71	Pit Leyder	Luxembourg	+ 19' 25"
72	Jan Maas	Netherlands	+ 19' 25"
73	Magnus Bak Klaris	Denmark	+ 19' 25"
74	Brandon McNulty	United States	+ 19' 25"
75	Stepan Kurianov	Russia	+ 19' 25"
76	Alejandro Osorio	Colombia	+ 19' 25"
77	Michel Ries	Luxembourg	+ 19' 25"
78	João Almeida	Portugal	+ 19' 25"
79	Yevgeniy Gidich	Kazakhstan	+ 19' 25"
80	Ryan Christensen	New Zealand	+ 21' 36"
81	Henok Mulubrhan	Eritrea	+ 21' 36"
82	Luc Wirtgen	Luxembourg	+ 21' 36"
83	Joseph Areruya	Rwanda	+ 21' 36"
84	Conn McDunphy	Ireland	+ 21' 36"
85	Charles-Étienne Chrétien	Canada	+ 21' 36"
86	Jordan Cárdenas	Ecuador	+ 21' 36"
87	Márton Dina	Hungary	+ 21' 36"
88	Fernando Barceló	Spain	+ 21' 36"
89	Max Stedman	Great Britain	+ 21' 53"

Rank	Rider	Country	Time
90	Idar Andersen	Norway	+ 23' 05"
	Ide Schelling	Netherlands	DNF
	Victor Lafay	France	DNF
	Brent Van Moer	Belgium	DNF
	Daire Feeley	Ireland	DNF
	Jakub Murias	Poland	DNF
	Filip Maciejuk	Poland	DNF
	Masahiro Ishigami	Japan	DNF
	Patrick Haller	Germany	DNF
	Tegshbayar Batsaikhan	Mongolia	DNF
	Jonas Rutsch	Germany	DNF
	Adam Roberge	Canada	DNF
	Joab Schneiter	Switzerland	DNF
	Viktor Potočki	Croatia	DNF
	Jambaljamts Sainbayar	Mongolia	DNF
	Mario Gamper	Austria	DNF
	Dinmukhammed Ulysbayev	Kazakhstan	DNF
	Gerardo López	Mexico	DNF
	Alex Hoehn	United States	DNF
	Kent Main	South Africa	DNF
	Awet Habtom	Eritrea	DNF
	Žiga Horvat	Slovenia	DNF
	Samuel Hakiruwizeye	Rwanda	DNF
	Matteo Sobrero	Italy	DNF
	Iván Sosa	Colombia	DNF
	Wilson Haro	Ecuador	DNF
	James Mitri	New Zealand	DNF
	Igor Chzhan	Kazakhstan	DNF
	Matúš Štoček	Slovakia	DNF
	Rasmus Tiller	Norway	DNF
	Nickolas Zukowsky	Canada	DNF
	Kakeru Omae	Japan	DNF
	Julius van den Berg	Netherlands	DNF
	Diego Ferreyra	Chile	DNF
	Jacob Eriksson	Sweden	DNF
	Veljko Stojnić	Serbia	DNF
	Ognjen Ilić	Serbia	DNF
	Nik Čemažar	Slovenia	DNF
	Denis Nekrasov	Russia	DNF
	Masaki Yamamoto	Japan	DNF
	Karel Tyrpekl	Czech Republic	DNF
	Tiago Antunes	Portugal	DNF
	Shoi Matsuda	Japan	DNF
	Zemenfes Solomon	Eritrea	DNF
	Filip Kvasina	Croatia	DNF
	David Jabuka	Croatia	DNF
	Fung Ka Hoo	Hong Kong	DNF
	Vladyslav Soltasiuk	Ukraine	DNF
	Cyrus Monk	Australia	DNF
	Fernando Finkler	Brazil	DNF
	Musa Mikayilzade	Azerbaijan	DNF
	Kevin Rivera	Costa Rica	DNF
	Eugenio Mirafuentes	Mexico	DNF
	Didier Munyaneza	Rwanda	DNF
	Piotr Pękala	Poland	DNF
	Omer Goldstein	Israel	DNF
	Callum Scotson	Australia	DNF
	Orluis Aular	Venezuela	DNF
	Edward Walsh	Canada	DNF
	Darragh O'Mahony	Ireland	DNF
	Szymon Tracz	Poland	DNF
	Kenny Molly	Belgium	DNF
	José Autran	Chile	DNF
	Jefferson Alveiro Cepeda	Ecuador	DNF
	Alexandros Agrotis	Cyprus	DNF
	Jonny Brown	United States	DNF
	Izidor Penko	Slovenia	DNF
	Paul Daumont	Burkina Faso	DNF
	Jean Paul René Ukiniwabo	Rwanda	DNF
	Timur Maleev	Ukraine	DNF
	Choy Hiu Fung	Hong Kong	DNF
	Ayumu Watanabe	Japan	DNF
	Leonel Quintero	Venezuela	DNF
	Michael O'Loughlin	Ireland	DNF
	Andrej Petrovski	North Macedonia	DNF
	Cyril Barthe	France	DNF
	Emil Dima	Romania	DNF
	Denis Vulcan	Romania	DNF
	Mateo Bratić	Croatia	DNF
	Erik Sandersson	Sweden	DNF
	Karim Shiraliyev	Azerbaijan	DNF
	Vincent Lau	Hong Kong	DNF
	Tyler Cole	Trinidad and Tobago	DNF
	Žiga Jerman	Slovenia	DNF
	Samuel Mugisha	Rwanda	DNF
	Ahmed Galdoune	Morocco	DNF
	Othman Harakat	Morocco	DNF
	Luke Mudgway	New Zealand	DNF
	Ignacio Espinoza	Chile	DNF
