= 2018 UCI Road World Championships – Men's under-23 time trial =

Men's under-23 time trial
2018 UCI Road World Championships
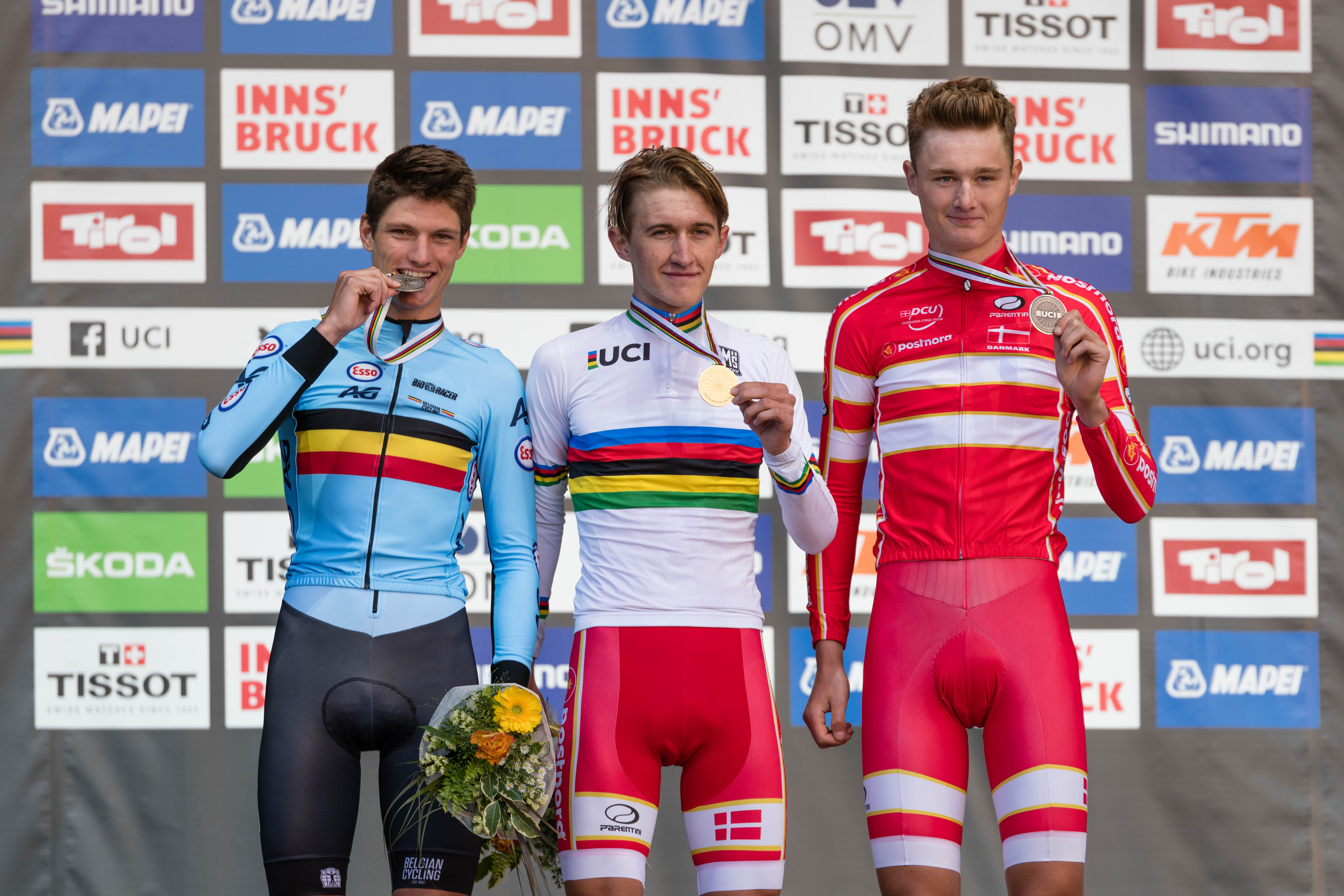
- The final podium (from left to right): Brent Van Moer (Belgium), Mikkel Bjerg and Mathias Norsgaard (both Denmark)

Race details
- Dates: 24 September 2018
- Stages: 1
- Distance: 27.7 km (17.21 mi)
- Winning time: 32' 31.05"

Medalists
	Gold	(Denmark) Mikkel Bjerg (DEN)
	Silver	(Belgium) Brent Van Moer (BEL)
	Bronze	(Denmark) Mathias Norsgaard (DEN)

The Men's under-23 time trial of the 2018 UCI Road World Championships was a cycling event that took place on 24 September 2018 in Innsbruck, Austria. It was the 23rd edition of the event, for which Danish rider Mikkel Bjerg was the defending champion, having won in 2017. 71 riders from 42 nations entered the competition, held over a rolling route 27.7 kilometres (17.2 miles) in length, starting from Wattens and ending in Innsbruck.

Bjerg became the first rider to win a second under-23 world time trial title, finishing 33.47 seconds clear of his closest competitor, Belgium's Brent Van Moer. The podium placings were completed by Bjerg's Danish team-mate Mathias Norsgaard, a further 4.83 seconds behind Van Moer.

== Qualification ==
All National Federations were allowed to enter four riders for the race, with a maximum of two riders to start. In addition to this number, the outgoing World Champion and the current continental champions were also able to take part.

=== Continental and defending World champions ===
Championship	Name	Note
Outgoing World Champion	Mikkel Bjerg (DEN)	Competed
European Champion	Edoardo Affini (ITA)	Competed
Pan American Champion	Diego Ferreyra (CHI)	Competed
Asian Champion	Hang Shi (CHN)	Did not compete
Oceanian Champion	Jake Marryatt (NZL)	Did not compete

=== Participating nations ===
71 cyclists from 42 nations were scheduled to take part in the men's under-23 time trial. However, one rider – Syria's Tarek Al Moakee – did not start, therefore reducing the event to 70 competitors from 41 nations. The number of cyclists per nation is shown in parentheses.

- Australia (1)
- Austria (2)
- Azerbaijan (1)
- Belgium (2)
- Burkina Faso (1)
- Canada (2)
- Chile (1)
- Cyprus (1)
- Czech Republic (1)
- Denmark (3)
- Eritrea (2)
- Estonia (1)
- Ethiopia (2)
- France (2)
- Germany (2)
- Great Britain (2)
- Hungary (1)
- Ireland (2)
- Italy (3)
- Japan (2)
- Kazakhstan (1)
- Luxembourg (2)
- North Macedonia (1)
- Mongolia (2)
- Morocco (1)
- Netherlands (2)
- Norway (2)
- Poland (1)
- Portugal (2)
- Russia (2)
- Rwanda (2)
- Serbia (2)
- Slovakia (2)
- Slovenia (2)
- South Africa (2)
- Spain (2)
- Switzerland (2)
- Syria (~~1~~)
- Taiwan (1)
- Trinidad and Tobago (1)
- Ukraine (2)
- United States (2)

== Final classification ==
All 70 race starters completed the 27.7-kilometre (17.2 mi)-long course.

Rank	Rider	Time
1	(Denmark) Mikkel Bjerg (DEN)	32' 31.05"
2	(Belgium) Brent Van Moer (BEL)	+ 33.47"
3	(Denmark) Mathias Norsgaard (DEN)	+ 38.30"
4	(Italy) Edoardo Affini (ITA)	+ 44.48"
5	(United Kingdom) Ethan Hayter (GBR)	+ 45.65"
6	(Norway) Tobias Foss (NOR)	+ 50.60"
7	(United States) Brandon McNulty (USA)	+ 52.79"
8	(South Africa) Stefan de Bod (RSA)	+ 59.43"
9	(Italy) Matteo Sobrero (ITA)	+ 1' 01.39"
10	(Australia) Callum Scotson (AUS)	+ 1' 01.52"
11	(Switzerland) Stefan Bissegger (SUI)	+ 1' 01.90"
12	(Austria) Patrick Gamper (AUT)	+ 1' 03.53"
13	(Norway) Andreas Leknessund (NOR)	+ 1' 03.67"
14	(Germany) Lennard Kämna (GER)	+ 1' 04.66"
15	(Germany) Max Kanter (GER)	+ 1' 05.04"
16	(Netherlands) Pascal Eenkhoorn (NED)	+ 1' 06.31"
17	(Ukraine) Mark Padun (UKR)	+ 1' 07.49"
18	(France) Alexys Brunel (FRA)	+ 1' 08.10"
19	(Czech Republic) Jakub Otruba (CZE)	+ 1' 11.66"
20	(Belgium) Senne Leysen (BEL)	+ 1' 18.57"
21	(Canada) Nickolas Zukowsky (CAN)	+ 1' 20.33"
22	(Poland) Filip Maciejuk (POL)	+ 1' 22.37"
23	(United States) Gage Hecht (USA)	+ 1' 22.72"
24	(Netherlands) Julius van den Berg (NED)	+ 1' 24.28"
25	(Republic of Ireland) Michael O'Loughlin (IRL)	+ 1' 27.63"
26	(Luxembourg) Tom Wirtgen (LUX)	+ 1' 30.90"
27	(United Kingdom) Charlie Tanfield (GBR)	+ 1' 31.70"
28	(Portugal) Ivo Oliveira (POR)	+ 1' 34.52"
29	(Spain) Jaime Castrillo (ESP)	+ 1' 38.06"
30	(Portugal) João Almeida (POR)	+ 1' 39.77"
31	(Denmark) Johan Price-Pejtersen (DEN)	+ 1' 40.74"
32	(Russia) Nikolay Cherkasov (RUS)	+ 1' 42.91"
33	(Hungary) Barnabás Peák (HUN)	+ 1' 44.79"
34	(Austria) Markus Wildauer (AUT)	+ 1' 44.93"
35	(France) Thibault Guernalec (FRA)	+ 1' 48.93"
36	(Italy) Alexander Konychev (ITA)	+ 1' 53.41"
37	(South Africa) Kent Main (RSA)	+ 2' 00.02"
38	(Republic of Ireland) Conn McDunphy (IRL)	+ 2' 06.44"
39	(Switzerland) Marc Hirschi (SUI)	+ 2' 07.20"
40	(Canada) Adam Roberge (CAN)	+ 2' 08.62"
41	(Slovenia) Jaka Primožič (SLO)	+ 2' 33.39"
42	(Estonia) Norman Vahtra (EST)	+ 2' 37.30"
43	(Chile) Diego Ferreyra (CHI)	+ 2' 50.30"
44	(Taiwan) Sergio Tu (TWN)	+ 2' 53.77"
45	(Serbia) Veljko Stojnić (SRB)	+ 2' 55.89"
46	(Cyprus) Andreas Miltiadis (CYP)	+ 2' 57.45"
47	(Japan) Shoi Matsuda (JPN)	+ 2' 58.18"
48	(Kazakhstan) Igor Chzhan (KAZ)	+ 3' 00.36"
49	(Japan) Masaki Yamamoto (JPN)	+ 3' 00.88"
50	(Luxembourg) Pit Leyder (LUX)	+ 3' 08.25"
51	(Russia) Petr Rikunov (RUS)	+ 3' 12.72"
52	(Mongolia) Tegshbayar Batsaikhan (MGL)	+ 3' 15.46"
53	(Slovakia) Matúš Štoček (SVK)	+ 3' 20.59"
54	(Ethiopia) Redwan Ebrahim (ETH)	+ 3' 24.94"
55	(Eritrea) Henok Mulubrhan (ERI)	+ 3' 36.89"
56	(Spain) José Félix Parra (ESP)	+ 3' 37.34"
57	(Ukraine) Timur Maleev (UKR)	+ 3' 39.30"
58	(North Macedonia) Andrej Petrovski (MKD)	+ 3' 41.57"
58	(Slovakia) Adrián Babič (SVK)	+ 3' 41.57"
60	(Mongolia) Jambaljamts Sainbayar (MGL)	+ 3' 49.61"
61	(Eritrea) Awet Habtom (ERI)	+ 3' 52.31"
62	(Rwanda) Samuel Mugisha (RWA)	+ 3' 52.62"
63	(Serbia) Ognjen Ilić (SRB)	+ 4' 03.73"
64	(Slovenia) Izidor Penko (SLO)	+ 4' 13.13"
65	(Rwanda) Joseph Areruya (RWA)	+ 4' 23.85"
66	(Burkina Faso) Paul Daumont (BUR)	+ 4' 47.03"
67	(Ethiopia) Million Beza (ETH)	+ 5' 31.63"
68	(Azerbaijan) Musa Mikayilzade (AZE)	+ 6' 46.48"
69	(Morocco) Othman Harakat (MAR)	+ 7' 13.41"
70	(Trinidad and Tobago) Tyler Cole (TRI)	+ 13' 28.47"
	(Syria) Tarek Al Moakee (SYR)	DNS
