= 2019 UCI Road World Championships – Men's under-23 time trial =

Men's under-23 time trial
2019 UCI Road World Championships

Race details
- Dates: 24 September 2019
- Stages: 1
- Distance: 30.3 km (18.83 mi)
- Winning time: 40' 20"

Medalists
	Gold	(Denmark) Mikkel Bjerg (DEN)
	Silver	(United States) Ian Garrison (USA)
	Bronze	(United States) Brandon McNulty (USA)

The Men's under-23 time trial of the 2019 UCI Road World Championships was a cycling event that took place on 24 September 2019 in Yorkshire, England. It was the 24th edition of the event, for which Danish rider Mikkel Bjerg was the two-time defending champion, having won in 2017 and 2018.

Bjerg became the first rider ever to win a third under-23 world time trial title, finishing 26.45 seconds clear of his closest competitor, Ian Garrison from the US. with the podium completed by Brandon McNulty, just 1.24 seconds behind Garrison.

== Qualification ==
All National Federations were allowed to enter four riders for the race, with a maximum of two riders to start. In addition to this number, the outgoing World Champion and the current continental champions were also able to take part.

=== Continental and defending World champions ===
Championship	Name	Note
Outgoing World Champion	Mikkel Bjerg (DEN)	Competed
European Champion	Johan Price-Pejtersen (DEN)	Competed
Asian Champion	Yevgeniy Fedorov (KAZ)	Competed
Oceanian Champion	Liam Magennis (AUS)	Competed
Pan American Champion	Diego Ferreyra (CHI)	Competed

== Final classification ==
59 of the 61 qualified riders completed the 30.3-kilometre course.

Rank	Rider	Country	Time
1	Mikkel Bjerg	Denmark	40' 20"
2	Ian Garrison	United States	+ 27"
3	Brandon McNulty	United States	+ 28"
4	Mathias Norsgaard	Denmark	+ 38"
5	Brent Van Moer	Belgium	+ 44"
6	Morten Hulgaard	Denmark	+ 56"
7	Nils Eekhoff	Netherlands	+ 1' 01"
8	Byron Munton	South Africa	+ 1' 27"
9	Markus Wildauer	Austria	+ 1' 39"
10	Daan Hoole	Netherlands	+ 1' 47"
11	Thibault Guernalec	France	+ 1' 50"
12	Tobias Foss	Norway	+ 1' 52"
13	Marc Hirschi	Switzerland	+ 1' 52"
14	Charlie Quarterman	Great Britain	+ 1' 53"
15	Ben Healy	Ireland	+ 1' 58"
16	Kevin Geniets	Luxembourg	+ 2' 03"
17	Iñigo Elosegui	Spain	+ 2' 04"
18	Iver Knotten	Norway	+ 2' 06"
19	Alexys Brunel	France	+ 2' 07"
20	Patrick Gamper	Austria	+ 2' 09"
21	Ethan Vernon	Great Britain	+ 2' 13"
22	Antonio Puppio	Italy	+ 2' 25"
23	Stefan Bissegger	Switzerland	+ 2' 34"
24	Ognjen Ilić	Serbia	+ 2' 35"
25	Miguel Heidemann	Germany	+ 2' 46"
26	Barnabás Peák	Hungary	+ 2' 46"
27	Matteo Sobrero	Italy	+ 2' 48"
28	João Almeida	Portugal	+ 2' 50"
29	Liam Magennis	Australia	+ 2' 51"
30	Filip Maciejuk	Poland	+ 2' 55"
31	Biniam Girmay	Eritrea	+ 2' 56"
32	Nickolas Zukowsky	Canada	+ 2' 56"
33	Juri Hollmann	Germany	+ 3' 01"
34	Jakub Otruba	Czech Republic	+ 3' 02"
35	Yevgeniy Fedorov	Kazakhstan	+ 3' 04"
36	Diego Ferreyra	Chile	+ 3' 20"
37	Ilan Van Wilder	Belgium	+ 3' 24"
38	Shoi Matsuda	Japan	+ 3' 30"
39	Vadim Pronskiy	Kazakhstan	+ 3' 34"
40	Sergio Tu	Taiwan	+ 3' 39"
41	Michael O'Loughlin	Ireland	+ 3' 40"
42	André Carvalho	Portugal	+ 3' 41"
43	Ben Katerberg	Canada	+ 3' 41"
44	James Fouché	New Zealand	+ 3' 52"
45	Shunsuke Imamura	Japan	+ 3' 57"
46	Xabier Azparren	Spain	+ 4' 00"
47	Petr Rikunov	Russia	+ 4' 06"
48	Yahor Shpakouski	Belarus	+ 4' 08"
49	Jaka Primožič	Slovenia	+ 4' 18"
50	Daniel Habtemichael	Eritrea	+ 4' 18"
51	Jason Oosthuizen	South Africa	+ 4' 44"
52	Emil Dima	Romania	+ 4' 44"
53	Samuel Oros	Slovakia	+ 4' 56"
54	Attila Valter	Hungary	+ 5' 40"
55	Hasani Hennis	Anguilla	+ 6' 41"
56	Tyler Cole	Trinidad and Tobago	+ 7' 21"
57	Lóránt Balázsi	Romania	+ 7' 30"
58	David Alexander Maidana	Paraguay	+ 7' 39"
59	Johan Price-Pejtersen	Norway	+ 11' 35"
	Vladyslav Soltasiuk	Ukraine	DNF
	Mohamed Rayes	Syria	DNS
