= 2017 UCI Road World Championships – Men's under-23 time trial =

Men's under-23 time trial
2017 UCI Road World Championships
- Time trial Rainbow jersey

Race details
- Dates: 18 September 2017
- Stages: 1
- Distance: 37.2 km (23.12 mi)
- Winning time: 47' 06"

Medalists
	Gold	Mikkel Bjerg (Denmark)
	Silver	Brandon McNulty (United States)
	Bronze	Corentin Ermenault (France)

The Men's under-23 time trial of the 2017 UCI Road World Championships took place in Bergen, Norway on 18 September 2017. The course of the race was 37.2 km (23.1 mi). It was won by Mikkel Bjerg of Denmark, who finished 1' 05" faster than American rider Brandon McNulty.

== Final classification ==
Rank	Rider	Nation	Time
1st place, gold medalist(s)	Mikkel Bjerg	Denmark	47' 06"
2nd place, silver medalist(s)	Brandon McNulty	United States	+ 1' 05"
3rd place, bronze medalist(s)	Corentin Ermenault	France	+ 1' 16"
4	Tom Wirtgen	Luxembourg	+ 1' 18"
5	Callum Scotson	Australia	+ 1' 21"
6	Senne Leysen	Belgium	+ 1' 22"
7	Kasper Asgreen	Denmark	+ 1' 31"
8	Edoardo Affini	Italy	+ 1' 35"
9	Neilson Powless	United States	+ 1' 37"
10	Scott Davies	United Kingdom	+ 1' 43"
11	Pavel Sivakov	Russia	+ 1' 47"
12	Rémi Cavagna	France	+ 1' 54"
13	Jaime Castrillo	Spain	+ 2' 12"
14	Yuriy Natarov	Kazakhstan	+ 2' 18"
15	Izidor Penko	Slovenia	+ 2' 22"
16	Mathias Norsgaard	Denmark	+ 2' 25"
17	Tobias Foss	Norway	+ 2' 25"
18	Marc Hirschi	Switzerland	+ 2' 28"
19	Julian Braun	Germany	+ 2' 30"
20	Patrick Haller	Germany	+ 2' 39"
21	Ivo Oliveira	Portugal	+ 2' 39"
22	Regan Gough	Australia	+ 2' 40"
23	Piotr Brozyna	Poland	+ 2' 47"
24	Szymon Sajnok	Poland	+ 2' 47"
25	Alexander Cowan	Canada	+ 2' 58"
26	Dmitry Strakhov	Russia	+ 3' 2"
27	Iver Knotten	Norway	+ 3' 03"
28	Daniel Martínez	Colombia	+ 3' 13"
29	Martin Schäppi	Switzerland	+ 3' 18"
30	Paolo Baccio	Italy	+ 3' 20"
31	Andreas Miltiadis	Cyprus	+ 3' 29"
32	Kevin Geniets	Luxembourg	+ 3' 29"
33	Barnabás Peák	Hungary	+ 3' 41"
34	Luis Villalobos	Mexico	+ 3' 48"
35	Patrick Gamper	Austria	+ 3' 48"
36	Markus Freiberger	Austria	+ 3' 51"
37	Fung Ka Hoo	Hong Kong	+ 3' 51"
38	Awet Habtom	Eritrea	+ 3' 52"
39	Sergio Samitier	Spain	+ 3' 58"
40	Vitaliy Novakovskyi	Ukraine	+ 4' 19"
41	Simon Musie	Eritrea	+ 4' 32"
42	Matic Grošelj	Slovenia	+ 4' 38"
43	Rei Onodera	Japan	+ 4' 40"
44	Atsushi Oka	Japan	+ 5' 14"
45	Jason Huertas	Costa Rica	+ 5' 18"
46	El Mehdi Chokri	Morocco	+ 5' 20"
47	Mauricio Moreira	Uruguay	+ 5' 24"
48	Ēriks Toms Gavars	Latvia	+ 5' 37"
49	Nathan Van Hooydonck	Belgium	+ 6' 0"
50	Omer Goldstein	Israel	+ 6' 20"
51	Andrej Petrovski	Macedonia	+ 6' 27"
52	Batsaikhan Teshbayar	Mongolia	+ 6' 31"
53	Daniel Jara	Costa Rica	+ 6' 52"
54	Michael O'Loughlin	Ireland	+ 7' 21"
55	Victor Langellotti	Monaco	+ 7' 25"
56	Jack Burke	Canada	+ 9' 26"
-	Charles Kagimu	Uganda	DNS
