= 1998 Tour de Pologne =

Cycling race

Race details
- Dates: 6–14 September 1998
- Stages: 8
- Distance: 1,443 km (896.6 mi)
- Winning time: 34h 21' 25"

Results
	Winner	Sergei Ivanov (RUS)
	Second	Jacky Durand (FRA)
	Third	Fabio Malberti (ITA)

The 1998 Tour de Pologne was the 55th edition of the Tour de Pologne cycle race and was held from 6 September to 14 September 1998. The race started in Słupsk and finished in Wieliczka. The race was won by Sergei Ivanov.

== General classification ==
Final general classification

Rank	Rider	Time
1	Sergei Ivanov (RUS)	34h 21' 25"
2	Jacky Durand (FRA)	+ 2' 26"
3	Fabio Malberti (ITA)	+ 3' 10"
4	Christophe Bassons (FRA)	+ 3' 22"
5	Raimondas Rumšas (LTU)	+ 3' 24"
6	Dariusz Baranowski (POL)	+ 3' 47"
7	Zbigniew Spruch (POL)	+ 4' 05"
8	Alexander Vinokourov (KAZ)	+ 4' 35"
9	Massimo Gimondi (ITA)	+ 5' 34"
10	Vladislav Bobrik (RUS)	+ 6' 06"
