= Fabio Malberti =

Italian cyclist

Personal information
- Born: 16 November 1976 (age 49) Desio, Italy

Cycling career
- Sport: Cycling
- Current team: Retired
- Discipline: Road
- Role: Rider
- Rider type: Time trialist

Professional teams
- 1998: Asics–CGA
- 1999: Riso Scotti–Vinavil
- 2000: Amica Chips–Tacconi Sport
- 2001: Liquigas–Pata
- 2002: LA Alumínios–Pecol–Bombarral
Medal record
Men's road bicycle racing
Representing Italy
World Championships
Gold medal – first place	1997 San Sebastián	Under-23 time trial

Fabio Malberti (born 16 November 1976 in Desio) is a former Italian racing cyclist.

== Major results ==
1997
1st Time trial, UCI Road World Under–23 Championships
1st Time trial, Mediterranean Games
1st Overall Giro delle Regioni

1st Stage 1

2nd Time trial, European Under-23 Road Championships
5th Overall GP Tell
1998
3rd Overall Tour de Pologne
6th Firenze–Pistoia
9th Gran Premio Bruno Beghelli
1999
1st Stage 8 Vuelta a Argentina
2nd Giro del Medio Brenta
4th Overall Volta a Portugal
9th Overall Setmana Catalana de Ciclisme
2000
3rd Overall Tour of Sweden
7th Overall Tour de Luxembourg
7th Overall Bayern Rundfahrt
2001
4th Giro della Liguria
6th Trofeo dell'Etna
7th Overall Uniqa Classic
