= Team Giant–Castelli =

Danish men's cycling team

Team information
- UCI code: TGC
- Registered: Denmark
- Founded: 2016
- Disbanded: 2017
- Discipline: Road
- Status: UCI Continental

Team name history
- 2016 2017: Team Giant Scatto; Team Giant–Castelli

Team Giant–Castelli was a professional men's cycling team based in Denmark, which competed in elite road bicycle racing events under UCI Continental rules.

The team disbanded at the end of the 2017 season.

== Team roster ==
As at 31 December 2017

Rider	Date of birth
Mikkel Bjerg (DNK)	3 November 1998 (aged 19)
Nicklas Bøje (DNK)	8 September 1994 (aged 23)
Joakim Bukdal (DNK)	4 September 1994 (aged 23)
Jakob Egholm (DNK)	27 April 1998 (aged 19)
Rasmus Iversen (DNK)	16 September 1997 (aged 20)
Thomas Edemann Jensen (DNK)	9 May 1995 (aged 22)
Frederik Madsen (DNK)	22 January 1998 (aged 19)
Mathias Norsgaard (DNK)	5 May 1997 (aged 20)

Rider	Date of birth
Casper Pedersen (DNK)	15 March 1996 (aged 21)
Nicklas Pedersen (DNK)	3 August 1993 (aged 24)
Rasmus Quaade (DNK)	7 January 1990 (aged 27)
Marius Therkildsen (DNK)	5 June 1996 (aged 21)
Sergio Tu (TWN)	24 February 1997 (aged 20)
Emil Vinjebo (DNK)	24 March 1994 (aged 23)
Casper von Folsach (DNK)	30 March 1993 (aged 24)
Aske Vorre (DNK)	24 May 1993 (aged 24)

== Major wins ==
2017
Stage 2 Paris-Arras Tour, Frederik Rodenberg
Stage 2 Flèche du Sud, Casper Pedersen
Stage 3 Ronde de l'Oise, Rasmus Quaade
GP Horsens Posten, Casper Pedersen
(Europe) U23 Road Race Championships, Casper Pedersen

== National & continental Champions ==
2017
European U23 Road Race, Casper Pedersen
Denmark Track (Team pursuit), Mikkel Bjerg
Denmark Track (Team pursuit), Casper Pedersen
Denmark Track (Team pursuit), Rasmus Quaade
Denmark Track (Team pursuit), Casper Von Folsach
Denmark Track (Points race), Casper Von Folsach
