= Jakob Egholm =

Danish cyclist (born 1998)

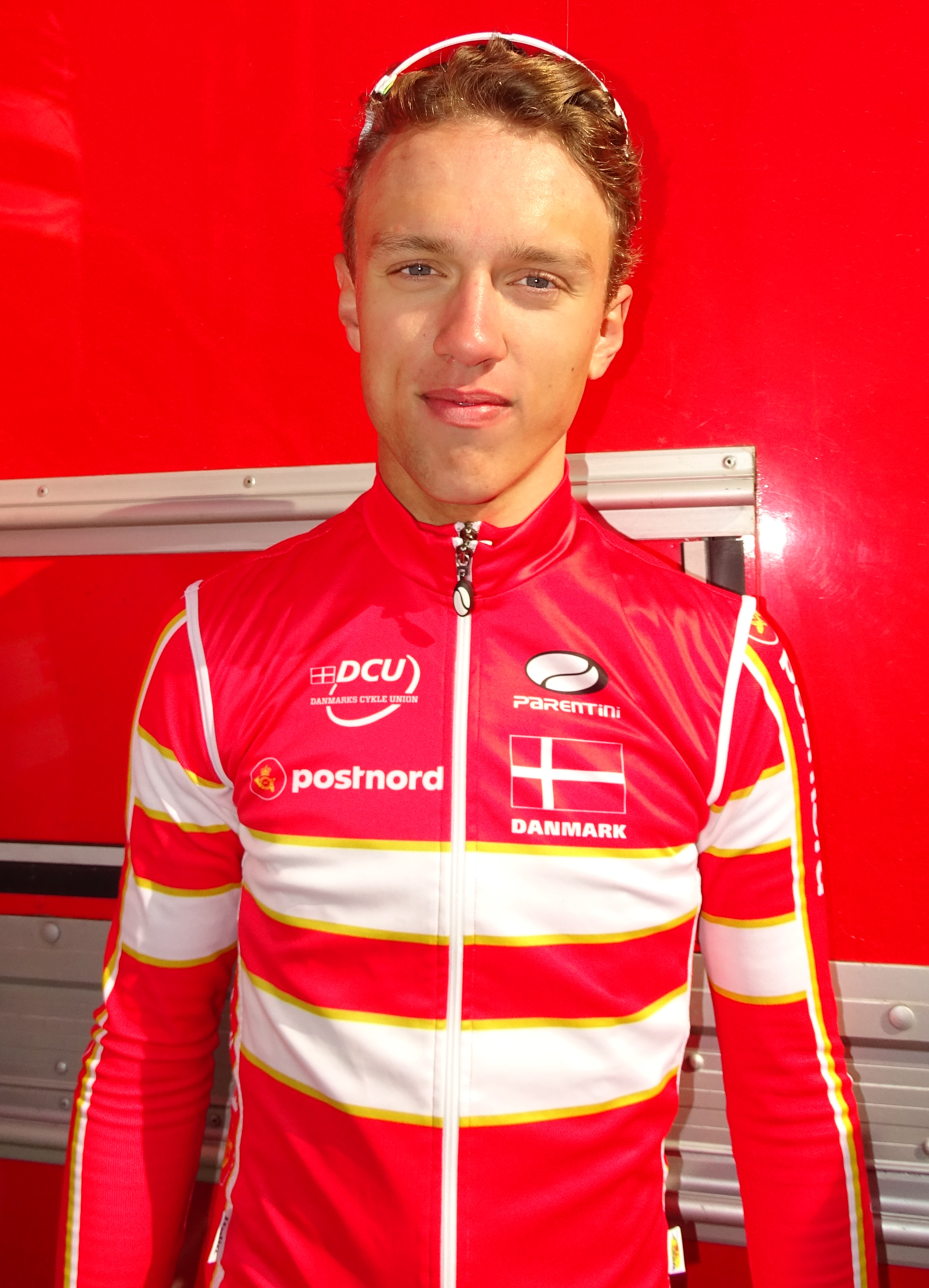
- Egholm in 2016

Personal information
- Full name: Jakob Egholm
- Born: 27 April 1998 (age 28) Holbæk, Denmark
- Height: 1.86 m (6 ft 1 in)
- Weight: 69 kg (152 lb)

Cycling career
- Sport: Cycling
- Current team: Airtox–Carl Ras
- Discipline: Road
- Role: Rider

Amateur team
- 2015–2016: Team Kelberg–Roskilde Junior

Professional teams
- 2017: Team Giant–Castelli
- 2018: Team Virtu Cycling
- 2019–2020: Hagens Berman Axeon
- 2021–2022: Trek–Segafredo
- 2023–: Restaurant Suri–Carl Ras

Jakob Egholm (born 27 April 1998) is a Danish cyclist, who currently rides for UCI Continental team Airtox–Carl Ras.

== Major results ==
2016
1st Road race, UCI Junior Road World Championships
2nd Overall Trophée Center Morbihan

1st Points classification
1st Stage 1

2018
7th Skive–Løbet
7th Eschborn–Frankfurt Under–23
9th Grand Prix Herning
2019
4th Road race, National Under-23 Road Championships
2023
4th Ringenloppet-SweCup 2
