= 2016 UCI Road World Championships =

World Road Cycling championship - Doha 2016

- Location within Doha
- Venue: Doha, Qatar
- Date: 9–16 October 2016
- Coordinates: 25°17′N 51°32′E

The 2016 UCI Road World Championships took place in Doha, Qatar, in October 2016. The championships was moved from the traditional September to October to avoid extreme hot and blustery weather. The event consisted of a road race, a team time trial and a time trial for elite men and women and a road race and a time trial for men under-23, junior men and junior women. It was the 89th Road World Championships and the first time that Qatar and the Middle East hosted the championships.

== Bidding ==
Qatar was announced as the host during the 2012 UCI Road World Championships in the Netherlands. Norway also made a bid but was unsuccessful. Norway will now be the host of the 2017 UCI Road World Championships.

== UCI WorldTeam boycott of team time trial ==
In August 2016 the AIGCP approved a motion for all UCI WorldTeams to boycott the time trial event, due to the UCI insisting that WorldTeams should compete in the event as a requirement of granting a WorldTeam licence without providing a participation allowance to teams, as is the case with other UCI World Tour races. It was reported that the UCI Professional Continental teams attending the AIGCP General Assembly also supported the motion. The UCI expressed disappointment with the move and stated that it "continued to expect excellent participation in this year's UCI Road World Championships Team Time Trial".

== Schedule ==
All times are in Arabia Standard Time (UTC+3).

Date	Timings		Event	Distance	
Team time trial events
9 October	14:10	15:15	Women's teams	40 km (25 mi)	
9 October	15:20	16:40	Men's teams	40 km (25 mi)	
Individual time trial events
10 October	09:30	10:40	Junior women	13.7 km (8.5 mi)	
10 October	11:30	15:50	Under-23 men	28.9 km (18.0 mi)	
11 October	09:00	12:30	Junior men	28.9 km (18.0 mi)	
11 October	13:30	16:45	Elite women	28.9 km (18.0 mi)	
12 October	13:45	16:05	Elite men	40.0 km (24.9 mi)	
Road race events					Laps
13 October	12:00	15:55	Under-23 men	165.7 km (103.0 mi)	10
14 October	08:30	10:30	Junior women	74.5 km (46.3 mi)	4
14 October	13:15	16:30	Junior men	135.3 km (84.1 mi)	8
15 October	12:45	16:20	Elite women	134.1 km (83.3 mi)	7
16 October	10:30	16:35	Elite men	257.3 km (159.9 mi)	7

== Courses ==
The races primarily started and finished in the capital city of Doha, the home base for the Tour of Qatar. The initial plans were to have a flat time trial circuit 10 kilometres (6.2 miles), with the men riding it four times, and a larger flat circuit of around 15 kilometres (9.3 miles) for the road race. However, UCI sport and technical director Philippe Chevallier stated in June 2013 that the courses did not meet the requirements for a world championship and it had been decided to construct a hilly purpose-built course, like had been done for the 1980 Summer Olympics. Despite this, in February 2014 Sheikh Khalid Bin Ali Al Thani, the president of the Qatar Cycling Federation, said that the organisers would not create a purpose-built course for the World Championships due to a lack of time.

The route for the Worlds road races was presented in February 2015, which was made up of a loop of 80 kilometres (50 miles) through the desert and a finishing circuit in Doha city centre, including 1.2 kilometres (0.75 miles) of cobblestones. The finishing circuit of 15.2 kilometres (9.4 miles) on The Pearl Island was used for a stage of February's Tour of Qatar: riders noted that the course was highly technical, going through 24 roundabouts, with stage winner Alexander Kristoff comparing it to a criterium. However it was also noted that the lack of long straight sections meant that the effect of the crosswinds frequently occurring in Qatar would be significantly lessened, reducing the race's unpredictability.

Subsequently, in August 2016 it was reported that the UCI had made changes to the course, increasing the amount of riding through the desert to 151 kilometres (94 miles) and reducing the number of laps of the finishing circuit from eleven down to seven. The start of the men's race was also moved to the Aspire Zone, with the riders heading out northwards towards Al Khor and returning to Doha. The women started from the Qatar Foundation in Education City, and completed seven laps of the finishing circuit, with a total race distance of 134.1 kilometres (83.3 miles).

== Events summary ==
=== Elite events ===
Event	Gold		Silver		Bronze	
Men's Events
Men's road race	Peter Sagan (SVK)	5h 40' 43"	Mark Cavendish (GBR)	s.t.	Tom Boonen (BEL)	s.t.
Men's time trial	Tony Martin (GER)	44' 42.99"	Vasil Kiryienka (BLR)	+ 45.05"	Jonathan Castroviejo (ESP)	+ 1' 10.91"
Men's team time trial	(Belgium) Etixx–Quick-Step	42' 32.39"	(United States) BMC Racing Team	+ 11.69"	(Australia) Orica–BikeExchange	+ 37.12"
Men's team time trial	Bob Jungels (LUX); Marcel Kittel (GER); Yves Lampaert (BEL); Tony Martin (GER); Niki Terpstra (NED); Julien Vermote (BEL)	42' 32.39"	Rohan Dennis (AUS); Stefan Küng (SUI); Daniel Oss (ITA); Taylor Phinney (USA); Manuel Quinziato (ITA); Joey Rosskopf (USA)	+ 11.69"	Luke Durbridge (AUS); Alex Edmondson (AUS); Michael Hepburn (AUS); Daryl Impey (RSA); Michael Matthews (AUS); Svein Tuft (CAN)	+ 37.12"
Women's Events
Women's road race	Amalie Dideriksen (DEN)	3h 10' 27"	Kirsten Wild (NED)	s.t.	Lotta Lepistö (FIN)	s.t.
Women's time trial	Amber Neben (USA)	36' 37.04"	Ellen van Dijk (NED)	+ 5.99"	Katrin Garfoot (AUS)	+ 8.32"
Women's team time trial	(Netherlands) Boels–Dolmans	48' 41.62"	(Germany) Canyon//SRAM	+ 48.24"	(Germany) Cervélo–Bigla Pro Cycling	+ 1' 56.47"
Women's team time trial	Chantal Blaak (NED); Karol-Ann Canuel (CAN); Lizzie Deignan (GBR); Christine Majerus (LUX); Evelyn Stevens (USA); Ellen van Dijk (NED)	48' 41.62"	Alena Amialiusik (BLR); Hannah Barnes (GBR); Lisa Brennauer (GER); Elena Cecchini (ITA); Mieke Kröger (GER); Trixi Worrack (GER)	+ 48.24"	Ciara Horne (GBR); Lisa Klein (GER); Lotta Lepistö (FIN); Ashleigh Moolman (RSA); Joëlle Numainville (CAN); Stephanie Pohl (GER)	+ 1' 56.47"

=== Under-23 events ===
Event	Gold		Silver		Bronze	
Men's Under-23 Events
Men's under-23 road race	Kristoffer Halvorsen (NOR)	3h 40' 53"	Pascal Ackermann (GER)	s.t.	Jakub Mareczko (ITA)	s.t.
Men's under-23 time trial	Marco Mathis (GER)	34' 08.09"	Maximilian Schachmann (GER)	+ 18.63"	Miles Scotson (AUS)	+ 37.98"

=== Junior events ===
Event	Gold		Silver		Bronze	
Men's Juniors Events
Men's junior road race	Jakob Egholm (DEN)	2h 58' 19"	Niklas Märkl (GER)	+ 7"	Reto Müller (SUI)	+ 7"
Men's junior time trial	Brandon McNulty (USA)	34' 42.29"	Mikkel Bjerg (DEN)	+ 35.18"	Ian Garrison (USA)	+ 53.08"
Women's Juniors Events
Women's junior road race	Elisa Balsamo (ITA)	1h 53' 04"	Skylar Schneider (USA)	s.t.	Susanne Andersen (NOR)	s.t.
Women's junior time trial	Karlijn Swinkels (NED)	18' 21.77"	Lisa Morzenti (ITA)	+ 7.35"	Juliette Labous (FRA)	+ 21.35"

== Medal table ==
Place	Nation	1st place, gold medalist(s)	2nd place, silver medalist(s)	3rd place, bronze medalist(s)	Total
1	Germany	2	4	1	7
2	United States	2	2	1	5
3	Netherlands	2	2	0	4
4	Denmark	2	1	0	3
5	Italy	1	1	1	3
6	Belgium	1	0	1	2
6	Norway	1	0	1	2
8	Slovakia	1	0	0	1
9	Belarus	0	1	0	1
9	Great Britain	0	1	0	1
11	Australia	0	0	3	3
12	Finland	0	0	1	1
12	France	0	0	1	1
12	Spain	0	0	1	1
12	Switzerland	0	0	1	1
Total		12	12	12	36

== Broadcasting ==
Live coverage

- Austria: ORF Sport +
- Belgium: Canvas, Eén, La Deux
- Brazil: SporTV, SporTV 2
- Brunei: Astro SuperSport 2
- Canada: RDS, RDS2
- China: LeSports
- Czech Republic: ČT Sport
- Denmark: TV 2 Sport, (Internet: TV2 Play)
- Estonia: Viasat Sport Baltic
- France: beIN Sports 2, France 3
- Germany: Eurosport 1
- Hungary: Sport1, Sport2
- India: Sony SIX
- Ireland: Eurosport
- Israel: Sport 2
- Italy: Rai Sport 1
- Japan: Speed Channel, NHK BS1
- Latvia: Viasat Sport Baltic
- Lithuania: Viasat Sport Baltic
- Malaysia: Astro SuperSport 2
- MENA (Pan Middle-East): beIN Sports, Alkass
- Netherlands: NPO 1
- New Zealand: Sky Sport
- Norway: TV 2, TV 2 Sportskanalen
- PAN Africa: SuperSport
- Portugal: RTP 2, (Internet: RTP Play)
- Russia: Arena/Planeta
- Slovakia: Dvojka
- Spain: Teledeporte
- Sweden: TV3 Sport, TV10
- Switzerland: RSI La 2, RTS Deux, SRF zwei
- Turkey: NTV Spor
- United Kingdom: BBC Red Button, Eurosport
- United States: Universal HD, (Internet: liveextra.nbcsports.com)
- Worldwide internet: tv.uci.ch

Other TV partners

- Polsat Sport Extra (Poland)
- Sport Klub (Bosnia, Croatia, Hungary, Kosovo, Macedonia, Montenegro, Poland, Serbia, Slovenia)
- Sportsnet One (Canada)
- SBS (Australia)
- TDN (Mexico)
- DirecTV (PAN America)
- RCN Televisión (Colombia)
