= Jaime Castrillo =

Spanish cyclist

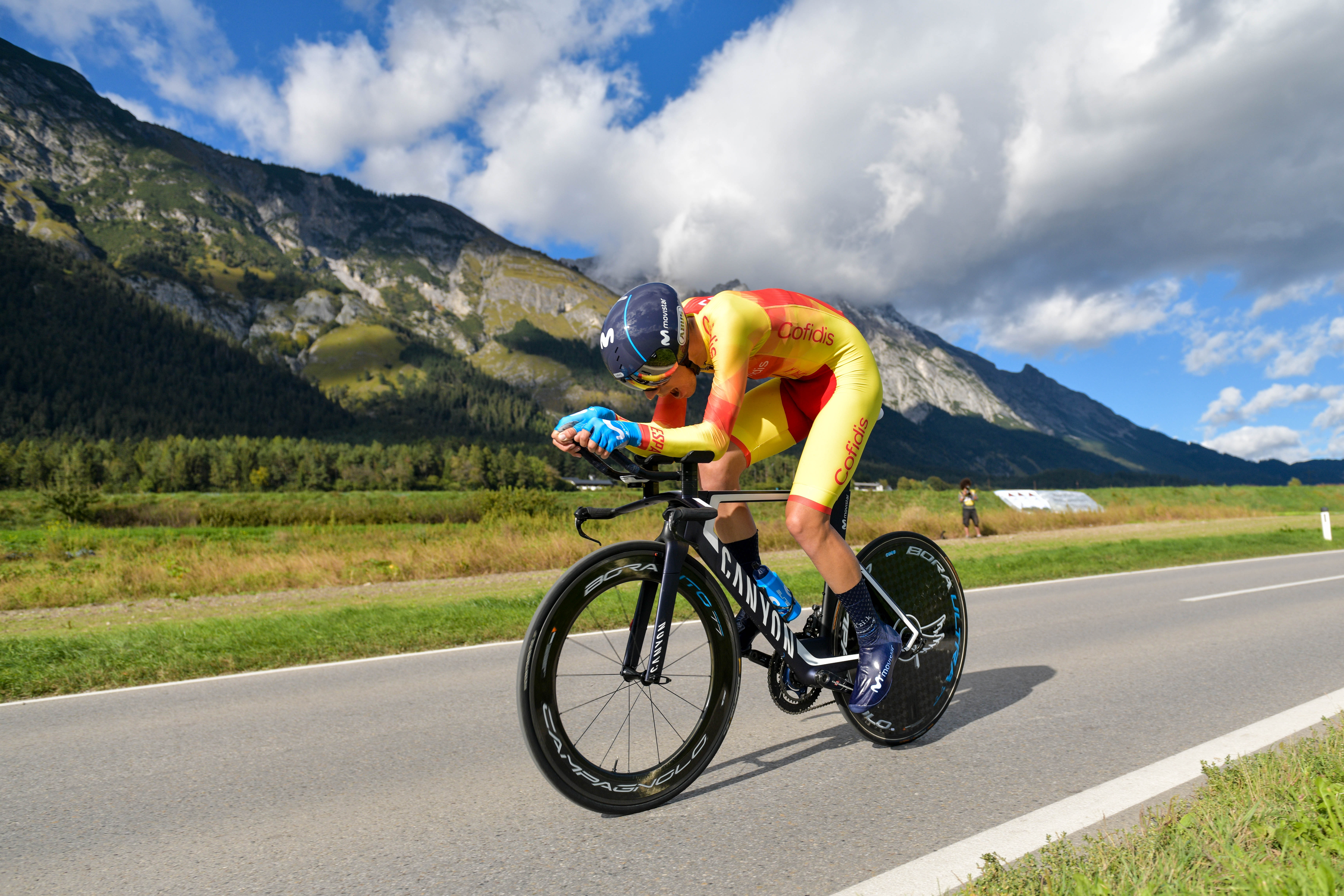
- Castrillo at the 2018 UCI Road World Championships

Personal information
- Full name: Jaime Castrillo Zapater
- Born: 13 March 1996 (age 30) Jaca, Spain
- Height: 1.86 m (6 ft 1 in)
- Weight: 65 kg (143 lb)

Cycling career
- Sport: Cycling
- Current team: Retired
- Discipline: Road
- Role: Rider

Amateur team
- 2015–2017: Lizarte

Professional teams
- 2018–2019: Movistar Team
- 2020–2022: Equipo Kern Pharma

Jaime Castrillo Zapater (born 13 March 1996 in Jaca) is a Spanish former cyclist, who competed as a professional from 2018 to 2022. His brother Pablo is also a professional cyclist.

== Major results ==
2014
1st Road race, National Junior Road Championships
2017
National Under-23 Road Championships

1st Time trial
10th Road race

2018
6th Road race, UCI Under-23 Road World Championships
2020
2nd Overall Tour of Serbia
4th Time trial, National Road Championships
6th Belgrade Banjaluka
2021
9th Overall Giro del Friuli Venezia Giulia
