= Brent Van Moer =

Belgian cyclist

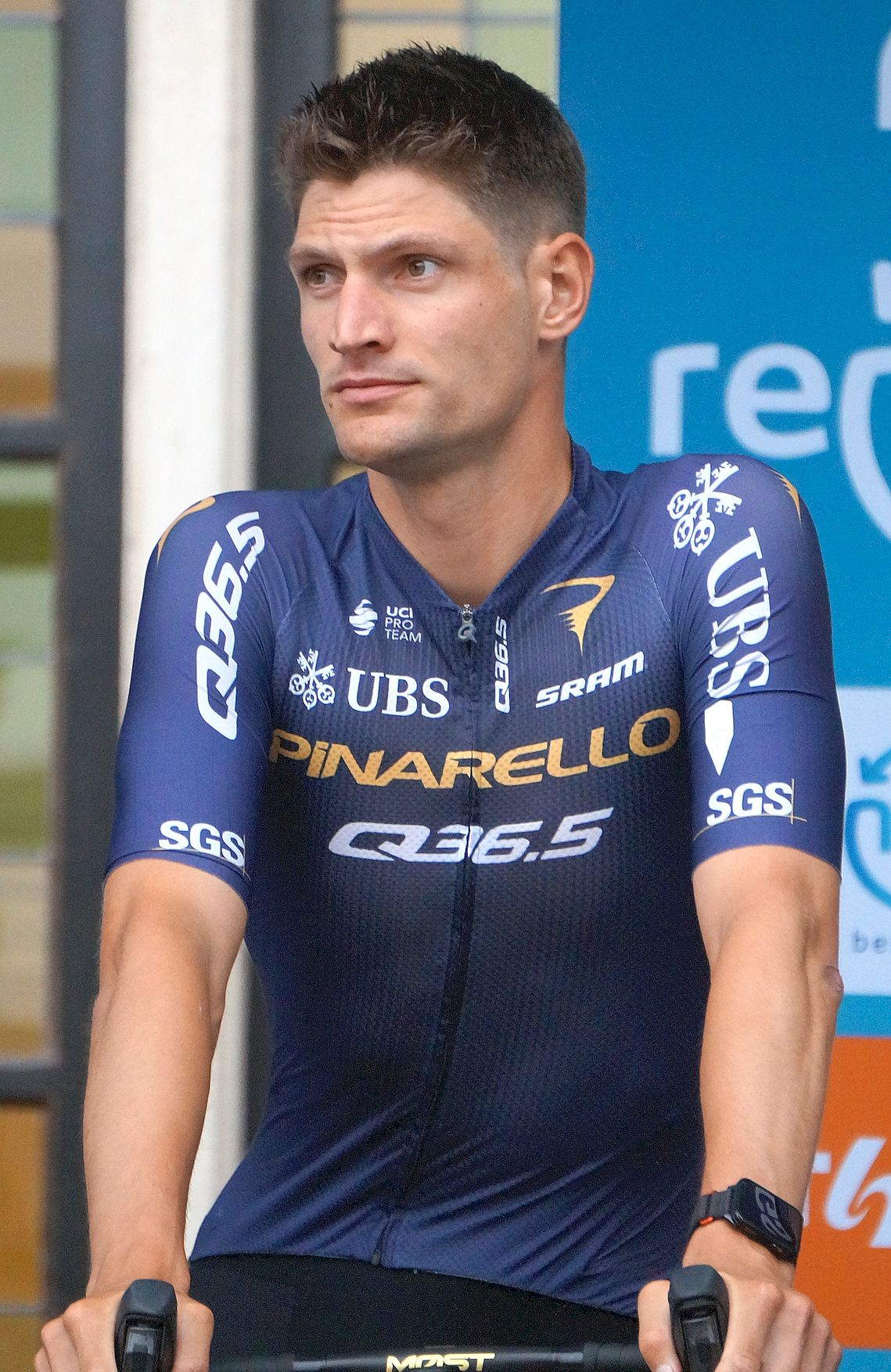
- Van Moer in 2026

Personal information
- Full name: Brent Van Moer
- Born: 12 January 1998 (age 28) Beveren, Belgium
- Height: 1.91 m (6 ft 3 in)
- Weight: 79 kg (174 lb)

Cycling career
- Sport: Cycling
- Current team: Lotto–Intermarché
- Discipline: Road
- Role: Rider

Amateur teams
- 2017–2019: Lotto–Soudal U23
- 2018: Lotto–Soudal (stagiaire)

Professional team
- 2019–: Lotto–Soudal
Medal record
Representing Belgium
Men's road bicycle racing
World Championships
Silver medal – second place	2018 Innsbruck	Under-23 time trial

Brent Van Moer (born 12 January 1998) is a Belgian cyclist, who currently rides for UCI ProTeam Lotto–Intermarché. In October 2020, he was named in the startlist for the 2020 Vuelta a España.

== Career ==
He won the first stage of the 2021 Critérium du Dauphiné with an impressive solo attack in which he held off the peloton. On stage 4 of 2021 Tour de France attacked as soon as 'the race is on' was declared ten kilometers into the stage. He and Pierre-Luc Périchon were the only two breakaway riders and the pair stayed away all day. He eventually went on a solo attack but he was caught in the final 150 meters by the peloton as Mark Cavendish went on to take stage. Van Moer was awarded the Most Combative Rider for his efforts.

== Major results ==
2016
1st Overall Sint-Martinusprijs Kontich

1st Stage 3a

3rd Overall Keizer der Juniores
6th La Philippe Gilbert Juniors
6th Omloop der Vlaamse Gewesten
7th Paris–Roubaix Juniors
9th E3 Harelbeke Junioren
2017
2nd Time trial, National Under-23 Road Championships
2018
2nd Time trial, UCI Road World Under-23 Championships
2nd Omloop Het Nieuwsblad Beloften
2nd De Kustpijl
6th Paris–Roubaix Espoirs
2019
1st Time trial, National Under-23 Road Championships
3rd Sundvolden GP
5th Time trial, UCI Road World Under-23 Championships
7th Overall Le Triptyque des Monts et Châteaux

1st Stage 2a (ITT)

7th Overall Danmark Rundt
2021 (1 pro win)
1st Stage 1 Critérium du Dauphiné
Combativity award Stage 4 Tour de France
2023
3rd Overall Tour de Wallonie

1st Sprints classification

3rd Grand Prix La Marseillaise
5th Overall Four Days of Dunkirk
7th Overall Danmark Rundt
2024
7th Grand Prix de Denain
8th Boucles de l'Aulne
9th Overall Étoile de Bessèges
2025
4th Omloop Het Nieuwsblad
5th Grand Prix de Denain
2026
7th Circuit de Wallonie

=== Grand Tour general classification results timeline ===
Grand Tour	2020	2021	2022
Giro d'Italia	—	—	—
Tour de France	—	65	122
Vuelta a España	100	—	—

Legend
—	Did not compete
DNF	Did not finish
