= UCI Road World Championships – Men's under-23 time trial =

World championship individual time trial race for men aged 23 or under

The UCI Road World Championships - Men's under-23 time trial is the annual world championship for road bicycle racing in the discipline of individual time trial for men aged 23 or under, organised by the world governing body, the Union Cycliste Internationale. The event was first run in 1996. In 2020 no race race was held due to the COVID-19 pandemic. Mikkel Bjerg is the most successful rider in the discipline, having won the event on three occasions.

== Medal winners ==
| Championships | Gold | Silver | Bronze |
|---|---|---|---|
| 1996 Lugano | Luca Sironi (ITA) | Roberto Sgambelluri (ITA) | Andreas Klöden (GER) |
| 1997 San Sebastián | Fabio Malberti (ITA) | László Bodrogi (HUN) | David George (RSA) |
| 1998 Valkenburg | Thor Hushovd (NOR) | Frédéric Finot (FRA) | Gian-Mario Ortenzi (ITA) |
| 1999 Verona | Iván Gutiérrez (ESP) | Michael Rogers (AUS) | Evgeni Petrov (RUS) |
| 2000 Plouay | Evgeni Petrov (RUS) | Fabian Cancellara (SUI) | Michael Rogers (AUS) |
| 2001 Lisbon | Danny Pate (USA) | Sebastian Lang (GER) | James Perry (RSA) |
| 2002 Zolder and Hasselt | Tomas Vaitkus (LTU) | Alexandre Bespalov (RUS) | Sérgio Paulinho (POR) |
| 2003 Hamilton | Markus Fothen (GER) | Niels Scheuneman (NED) | Alexandre Bespalov (RUS) |
| 2004 Verona | Janez Brajkovič (SLO) | Thomas Dekker (NED) | Vincenzo Nibali (ITA) |
| 2005 Madrid | Mikhail Ignatiev (RUS) | Dmitry Grabovskiy (UKR) | Peter Latham (NZL) |
| 2006 Salzburg | Dominique Cornu (BEL) | Mikhail Ignatiev (RUS) | Jérôme Coppel (FRA) |
| 2007 Stuttgart | Lars Boom (NED) | Mikhail Ignatiev (RUS) | Jérôme Coppel (FRA) |
| 2008 Varese | Adriano Malori (ITA) | Patrick Gretsch (GER) | Cameron Meyer (AUS) |
| 2009 Mendrisio | Jack Bobridge (AUS) | Nélson Oliveira (POR) | Patrick Gretsch (GER) |
| 2010 Melbourne and Geelong | Taylor Phinney (USA) | Luke Durbridge (AUS) | Marcel Kittel (GER) |
| 2011 Copenhagen | Luke Durbridge (AUS) | Rasmus Quaade (DEN) | Michael Hepburn (AUS) |
| 2012 Valkenburg | Anton Vorobyev (RUS) | Rohan Dennis (AUS) | Damien Howson (AUS) |
| 2013 Florence | Damien Howson (AUS) | Yoann Paillot (FRA) | Lasse Norman Hansen (DEN) |
| 2014 Ponferrada | Campbell Flakemore (AUS) | Ryan Mullen (IRL) | Stefan Küng (SUI) |
| 2015 Richmond | Mads Würtz Schmidt (DEN) | Maximilian Schachmann (GER) | Lennard Kämna (GER) |
| 2016 Doha | Marco Mathis (GER) | Maximilian Schachmann (GER) | Miles Scotson (AUS) |
| 2017 Bergen | Mikkel Bjerg (DEN) | Brandon McNulty (USA) | Corentin Ermenault (FRA) |
| 2018 Innsbruck | Mikkel Bjerg (DEN) | Brent Van Moer (BEL) | Mathias Norsgaard (DEN) |
| 2019 Yorkshire | Mikkel Bjerg (DEN) | Ian Garrison (USA) | Brandon McNulty (USA) |
| 2021 Leuven | Johan Price-Pejtersen (DEN) | Luke Plapp (AUS) | Florian Vermeersch (BEL) |
| 2022 Wollongong | Søren Wærenskjold (NOR) | Alec Segaert (BEL) | Leo Hayter (GBR) |
| 2023 Glasgow | Lorenzo Milesi (ITA) | Alec Segaert (BEL) | Hamish McKenzie (AUS) |
| 2024 Zurich | Iván Romeo (ESP) | Jakob Söderqvist (SWE) | Jan Christen (SUI) |
| 2025 Kigali | Jakob Söderqvist (SWE) | Nate Pringle (NZL) | Maxime Decomble (FRA) |
| 2026 Montreal | Ryan Gal (NED) | Nicolas Milesi (ITA) | Hector Alvarez (ESP) |

=== Medallists by nation ===
| Rank | Nation | Gold | Silver | Bronze | Total |
|---|---|---|---|---|---|
| 1 | Denmark | 5 | 1 | 2 | 8 |
| 2 | Australia | 4 | 4 | 6 | 14 |
| 3 | Italy | 4 | 2 | 2 | 8 |
| 4 | Russia | 3 | 3 | 2 | 8 |
| 5 | Germany | 2 | 4 | 4 | 10 |
| 6 | United States | 2 | 2 | 1 | 5 |
| 7 | Netherlands | 2 | 2 | 0 | 4 |
| 8 | Spain | 2 | 0 | 1 | 3 |
| 9 | Norway | 2 | 0 | 0 | 2 |
| 10 | Belgium | 1 | 3 | 1 | 5 |
| 11 | Sweden | 1 | 1 | 0 | 2 |
| 12 | Lithuania | 1 | 0 | 0 | 1 |
| 12 | Slovenia | 1 | 0 | 0 | 1 |
| 14 | France | 0 | 2 | 4 | 6 |
| 15 | Switzerland | 0 | 1 | 2 | 3 |
| 16 | New Zealand | 0 | 1 | 1 | 2 |
| 16 | Portugal | 0 | 1 | 1 | 2 |
| 18 | Hungary | 0 | 1 | 0 | 1 |
| 18 | Ireland | 0 | 1 | 0 | 1 |
| 18 | Ukraine | 0 | 1 | 0 | 1 |
| 21 | South Africa | 0 | 0 | 2 | 2 |
| 22 | Great Britain | 0 | 0 | 1 | 1 |
| Totals (22 entries) | | 30 | 30 | 30 | 90 |
