= Mikkel Bjerg =

Danish cyclist (born 1998)

Mikkel Norsgaard Bjerg
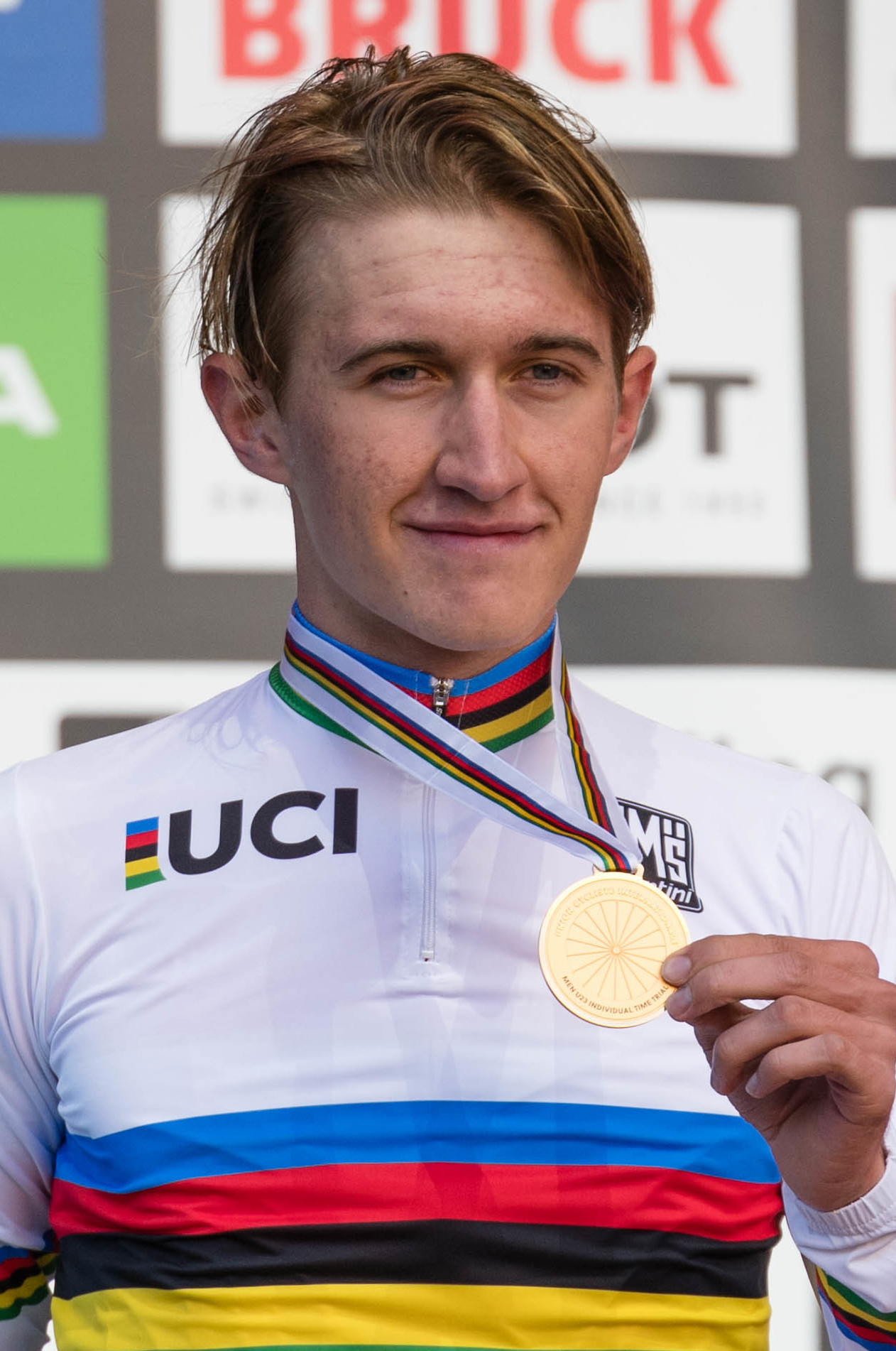
- Bjerg in 2018

Personal information
- Full name: Mikkel Norsgaard Bjerg
- Born: 3 November 1998 (age 27) Copenhagen, Denmark
- Height: 1.91 m (6 ft 3 in)
- Weight: 78 kg (172 lb)

Cycling career
- Sport: Cycling
- Current team: UAE Team Emirates XRG
- Discipline: Road
- Role: Rider
- Rider type: Time trialist

Professional teams
- 2017: Team Giant–Castelli
- 2018–2019: Hagens Berman Axeon
- 2020–: UAE Team Emirates

Major wins
- Grand Tours Vuelta a España 1 TTT stage (2025)
Medal record
Representing Denmark
Men's road bicycle racing
World Championships
Gold medal – first place	2017 Bergen	Under-23 time trial
Gold medal – first place	2018 Innsbruck	Under-23 time trial
Gold medal – first place	2019 Yorkshire	Under-23 time trial
Silver medal – second place	2016 Doha	Junior time trial
European Championships
Gold medal – first place	2017 Herning	Under-23 time trial
Silver medal – second place	2019 Alkmaar	Under-23 time trial

Mikkel Bjerg (born 3 November 1998) is a Danish cyclist, who currently rides for UCI WorldTeam UAE Team Emirates XRG. Bjerg won the under-23 individual time trial at the UCI Road World Championships in 2017, 2018 and 2019 – becoming the first rider to win multiple under-23 time trial world titles. He is the current (as of 2019) holder of the Danish hour record. Bjerg married cyclist Emma Norsgaard in 2021.

== Major results ==
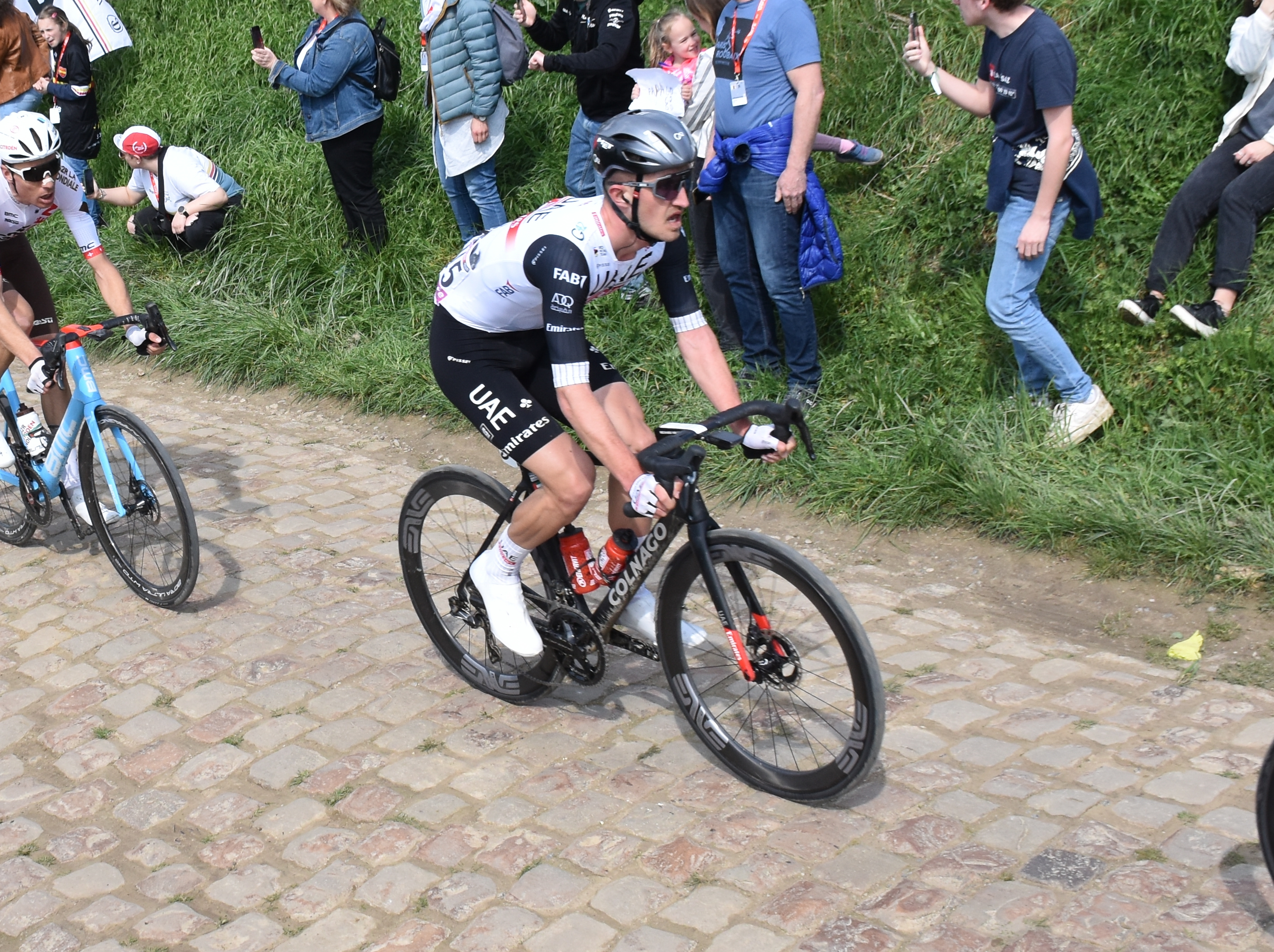
Paris-Roubaix 2023 - Secteur pavé de Quiévy à Saint-Python - N° 145 Mikkel Bjerg.

2016
1st Time trial, National Junior Road Championships
1st Overall Aubel–Thimister–La Gleize
2nd Time trial, UCI Junior Road World Championships
2nd Overall Tour de l'Abitibi

1st Stage 7

2017
1st Time trial, UCI Road World Under-23 Championships
2nd Time trial, UEC European Under-23 Road Championships
2nd Time trial, National Under-23 Road Championships
2nd Duo Normand (with Mathias Norsgaard)
2nd Chrono des Nations
3rd Time trial, National Road Championships
8th GP Viborg
10th ZLM Tour
2018
1st Time trial, UCI Road World Under-23 Championships
1st Dorpenomloop Rucphen
1st Stage 4 (TTT) Tour de l'Avenir
2nd Time trial, National Road Championships
2nd Chrono des Nations
2nd Chrono Champenois
2nd Hafjell GP
2019
UCI Road World Under-23 Championships

1st Time trial
8th Road race

1st Overall Le Triptyque des Monts et Châteaux
1st Chrono Champenois
1st Hafjell GP
2nd Time trial, UEC European Under-23 Road Championships
2nd Time trial, National Under-23 Road Championships
5th Time trial, National Road Championships
5th Chrono des Nations
6th Overall Danmark Rundt
2021
2nd Time trial, National Road Championships
2022
4th Time trial, UEC European Road Championships
2023 (1 pro win)
1st Stage 4 (ITT) Critérium du Dauphiné
3rd Time trial, National Road Championships
4th Time trial, UEC European Road Championships
5th Grand Prix de Denain
5th Chrono des Nations
6th Gent–Wevelgem
9th Time trial, UCI Road World Championships
2024
3rd Time trial, National Road Championships
4th Tour of Flanders
10th Time trial, Olympic Games
2025
1st Stage 5 (TTT) Vuelta a España
6th Chrono des Nations
2026
2nd Time trial, National Road Championships

=== Grand Tour general classification results timeline ===
Grand Tour	2020	2021	2022	2023	2024	2025
Giro d'Italia	97	—	—	—	108	—
Tour de France	—	110	124	123	—	—
Vuelta a España	—	—	—	—	—	139

==== Major championships timeline ====
Event		2017	2018	2019	2020	2021	2022	2023	2024	2025
World Championships	Time trial	—	—	—	17	17	14	9	14	—
World Championships	Road race	—	—	—	—	DNF	92	DNF	—	—
European Championships	Time trial	—	—	—	—	21	4	4	11	—
European Championships	Road race	—	—	—	—	—	104	DNF	DNF	—
National Championships	Time trial	3	2	5	—	2	—	3	3	6
National Championships	Road race	12	21	45	—	12	—	—	73	26

Legend
—	Did not compete
DNF	Did not finish
