= 2018 UCI Road World Championships =

Cycling world championships

- Location within Tyrol, Austria Location within Austria
- Venue: Innsbruck, Austria
- Date: 22–30 September 2018
- Coordinates: 47°16′N 11°23′E
- Events: 12

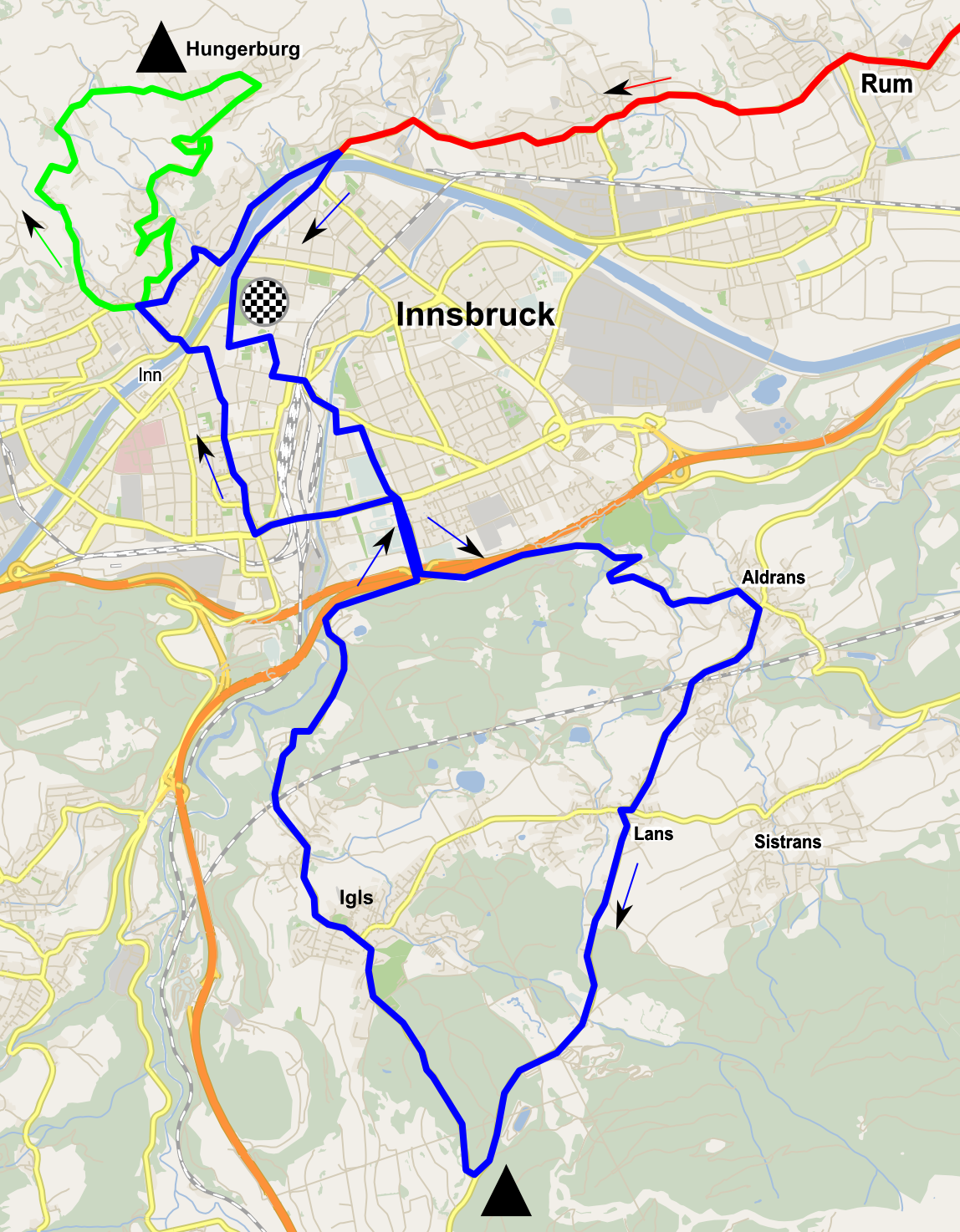
Part of the Road Race course

The 2018 UCI Road World Championships were held in Innsbruck, Austria. It was the 91st UCI Road World Championships and the third to be held in Austria.

The World Championships consisted of a total of twelve competitions, one road race, one team time trial and one individual time trial for men and women, as well as one road race and one individual time trial for U23 riders and juniors. The Tour de Suisse organisers were responsible for the operational organisation of the races. The competitions were very demanding: the 265-kilometre men's road race had nine climbs with around 5000 metres of altitude difference. Because of the many climbs, some sprinters did not participate in the World Championships because they saw no prospect of success for themselves. It was the last edition to feature a team time trial for UCI trade teams. From 2019 onwards it will be replaced by a mixed team time trial for national teams.

== Schedule ==
All times are in CEST (UTC+2).

Date	Timings		Event	Location (start)	Location (finish)	Distance	
Team time trial events
23 September	10:10	12:05	Women's teams	Ötztal	Innsbruck	54.5 km (33.9 mi)	
23 September	14:40	17:05	Men's teams	Ötztal	Innsbruck	62.8 km (39.0 mi)	
Individual time trial events
24 September	10:10	11:55	Junior women	Wattens	Innsbruck	20 km (12 mi)	
24 September	14:40	16:50	Under-23 men	Wattens	Innsbruck	27.8 km (17.3 mi)	
25 September	10:10	12:40	Junior men	Wattens	Innsbruck	27.8 km (17.3 mi)	
25 September	14:40	16:50	Elite women	Wattens	Innsbruck	27.8 km (17.3 mi)	
26 September	14:10	17:10	Elite men	Rattenberg	Innsbruck	52.5 km (32.6 mi)	
Road race events						Distance	Laps
27 September	9:10	11:15	Junior women	Alpbachtal Seenland	Innsbruck	71.7 km (44.6 mi)	1 short
27 September	14:40	18:15	Junior men	Kufstein	Innsbruck	132.4 km (82.3 mi)	2 short
28 September	12:10	16:50	Under-23 men	Kufstein	Innsbruck	179.9 km (111.8 mi)	4 short
29 September	12:10	16:45	Elite women	Kufstein	Innsbruck	156.2 km (97.1 mi)	3 short
30 September	9:40	16:50	Elite men	Kufstein	Innsbruck	258.5 km (160.6 mi)	6 short 1 long

== Events summary ==
=== Elite events ===
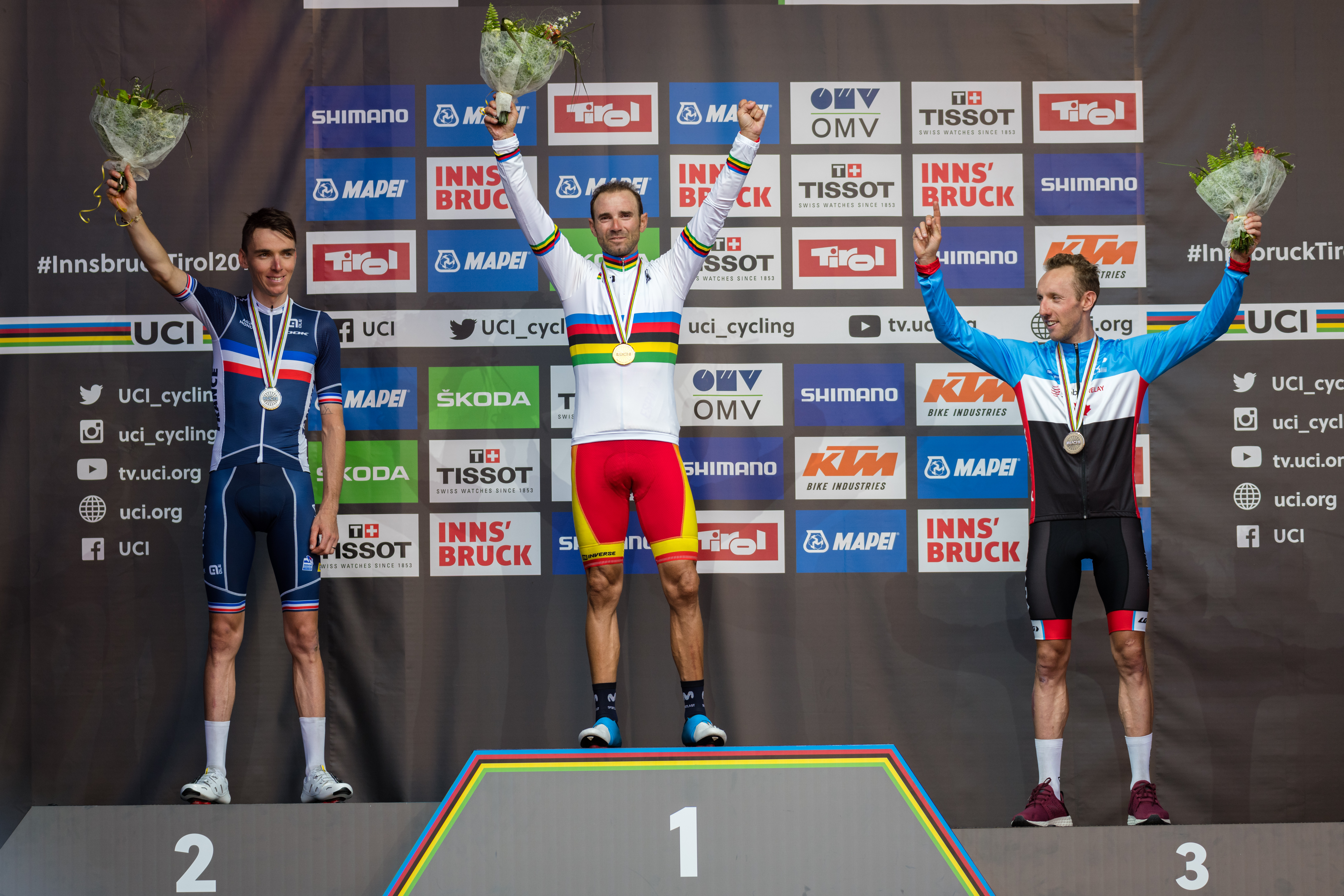
The podium after the men's elite road race, with Romain Bardet, Alejandro Valverde and Michael Woods (from left to right)

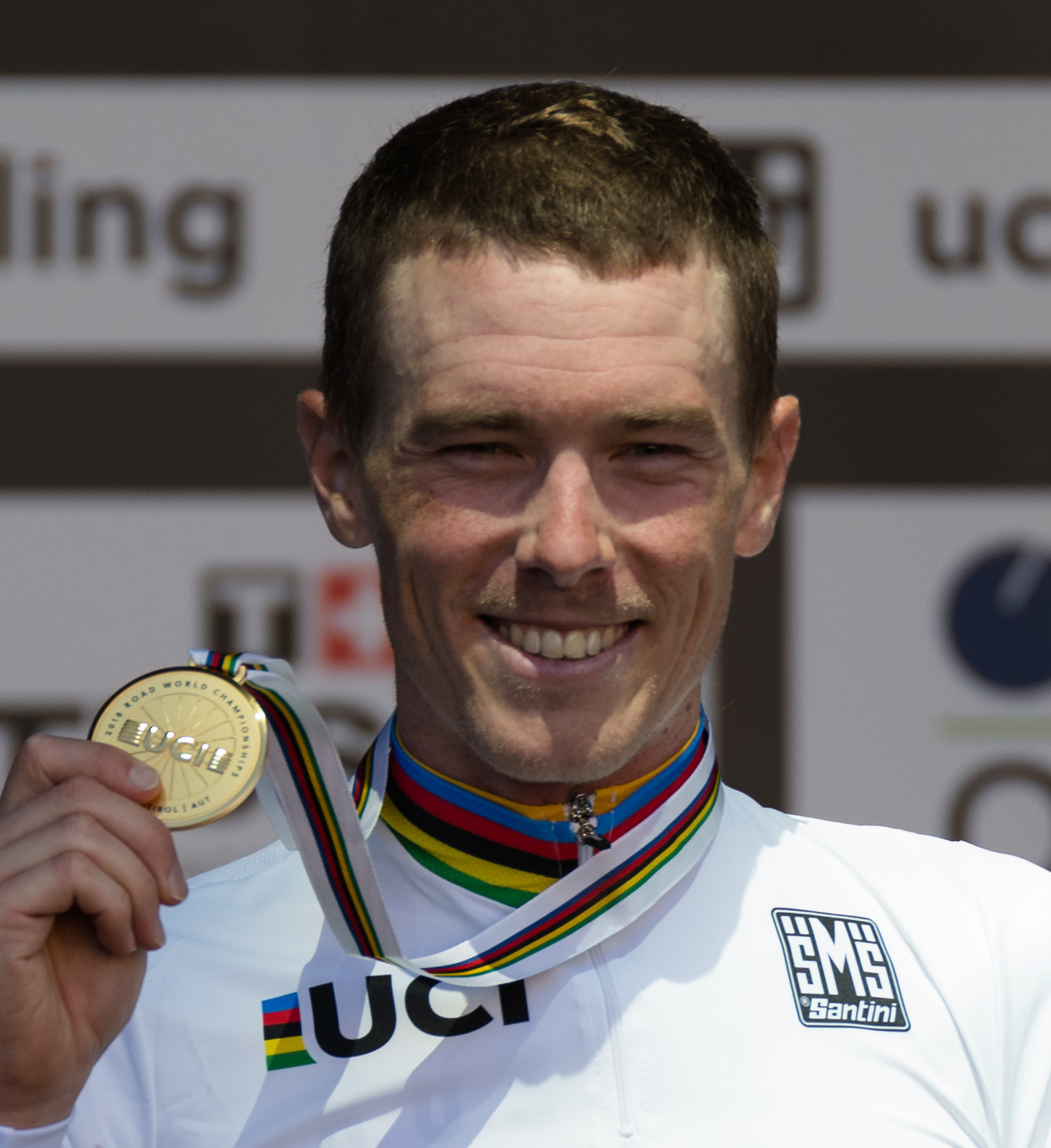
Rohan Dennis after receiving his gold medal in the men's time trial

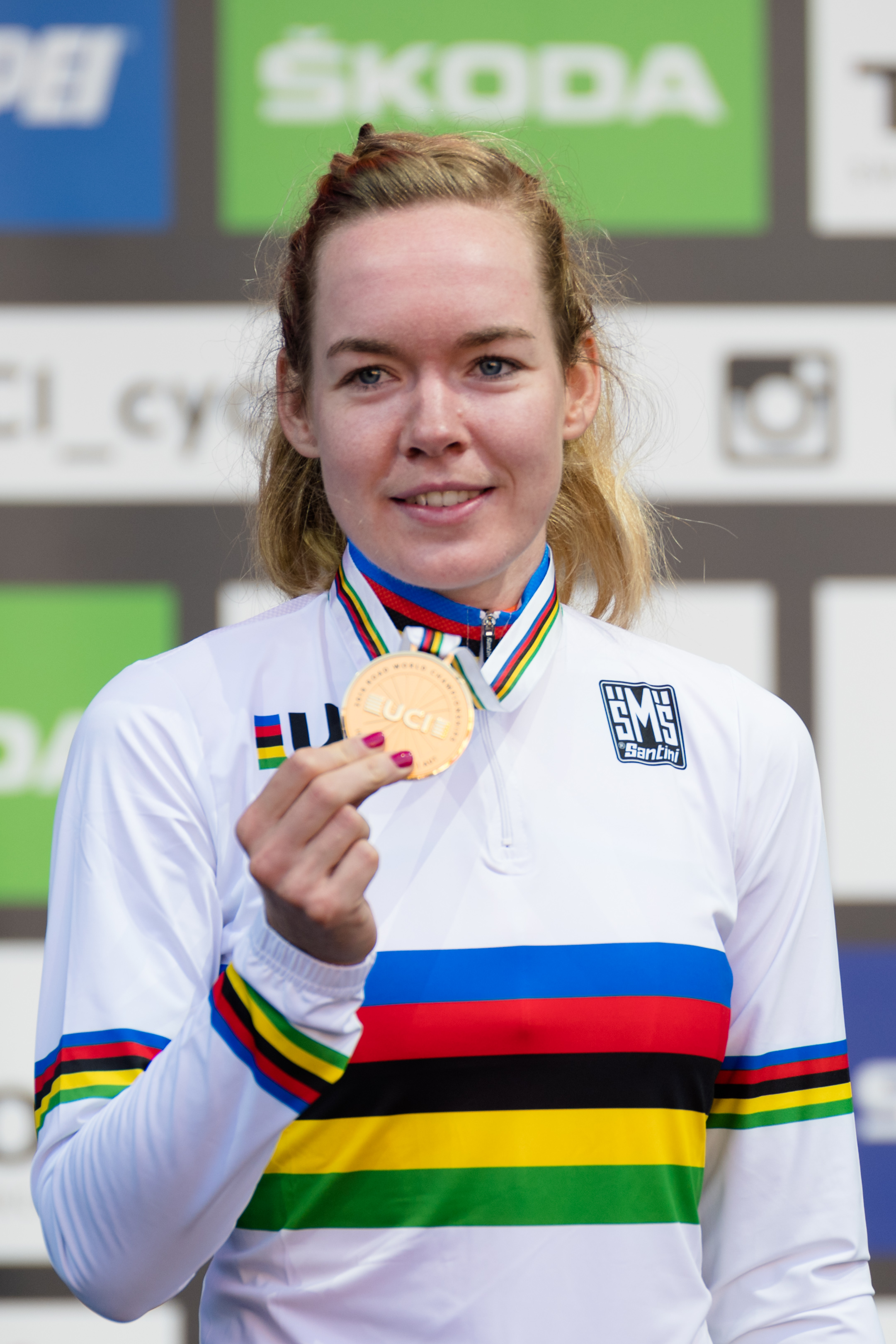
Anna van der Breggen with her gold medal from the women's elite road race

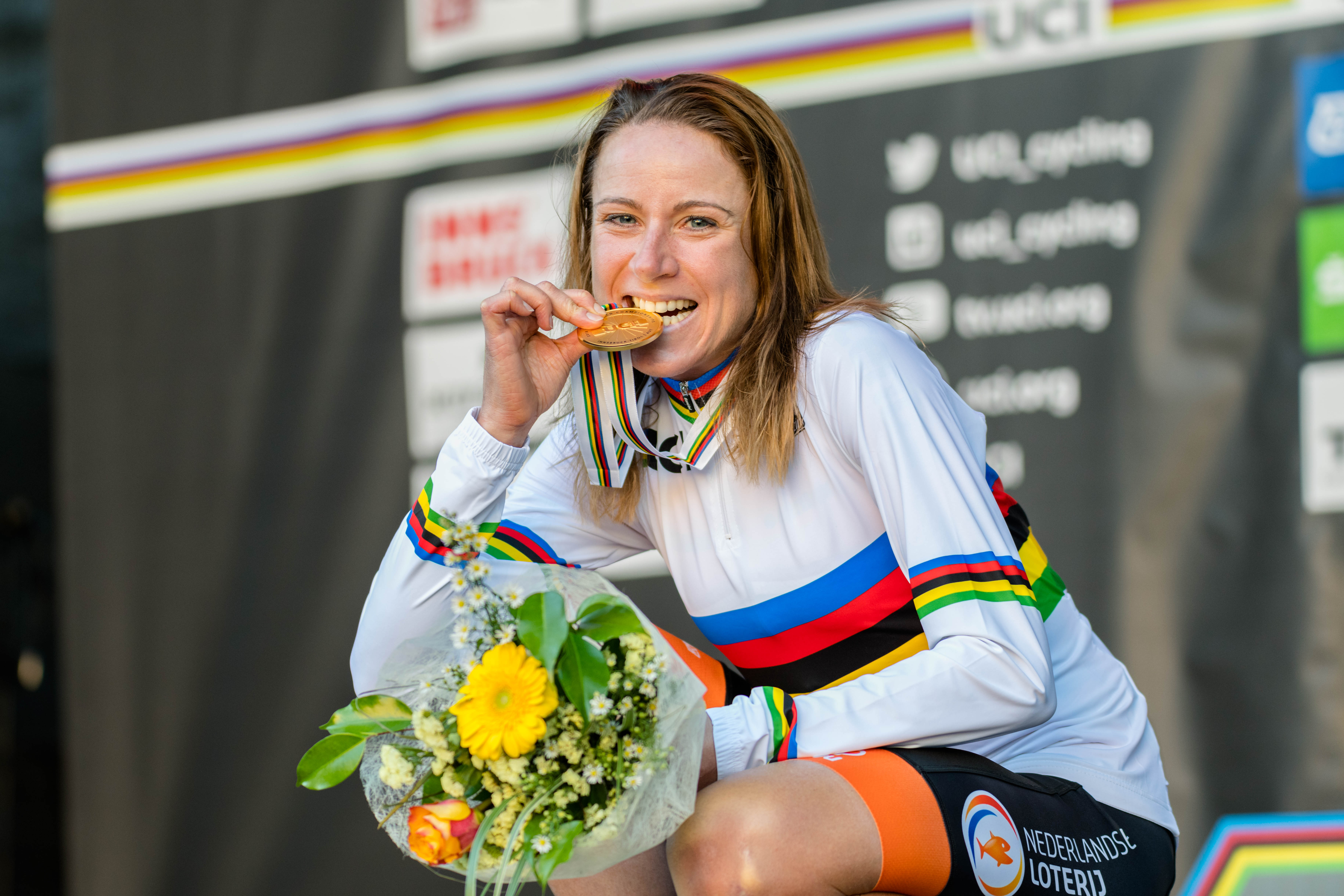
Annemiek van Vleuten, winner of the women's time trial

Event	Gold		Silver		Bronze	
Men's Events
Men's road race	Alejandro Valverde (ESP)	6h 46' 41"	Romain Bardet (FRA)	+ 0"	Michael Woods (CAN)	+ 0"
Men's time trial	Rohan Dennis (AUS)	1h 03' 02.57"	Tom Dumoulin (NED)	+ 1' 21.09"	Victor Campenaerts (BEL)	+ 1' 21.62"
Men's team time trial	(Belgium) Quick-Step Floors	1h 07' 25.94"	(Netherlands) Team Sunweb	+ 18.46"	(United States) BMC Racing Team	+ 19.55"
Men's team time trial	Kasper Asgreen (DEN); Laurens De Plus (BEL); Bob Jungels (LUX); Yves Lampaert (BEL); Maximilian Schachmann (GER); Niki Terpstra (NED)	1h 07' 25.94"	Tom Dumoulin (NED); Chad Haga (USA); Wilco Kelderman (NED); Søren Kragh Andersen (DEN); Michael Matthews (AUS); Sam Oomen (NED)	+ 18.46"	Patrick Bevin (NZL); Damiano Caruso (ITA); Rohan Dennis (AUS); Stefan Küng (SUI); Greg Van Avermaet (BEL); Tejay van Garderen (USA)	+ 19.55"
Women's Events
Women's road race	Anna van der Breggen (NED)	4h 11' 04"	Amanda Spratt (AUS)	+ 3' 42"	Tatiana Guderzo (ITA)	+ 5' 26"
Women's time trial	Annemiek van Vleuten (NED)	34' 25.36"	Anna van der Breggen (NED)	+ 28.99"	Ellen van Dijk (NED)	+ 1' 25.19"
Women's team time trial	(Germany) Canyon//SRAM	1h 01' 46.60"	(Netherlands) Boels–Dolmans	+ 21.90"	(Netherlands) Team Sunweb	+ 28.67"
Women's team time trial	Alena Amialiusik (BLR); Alice Barnes (GBR); Hannah Barnes (GBR); Elena Cecchini (ITA); Lisa Klein (GER); Trixi Worrack (GER)	1h 01' 46.60"	Chantal Blaak (NED); Karol-Ann Canuel (CAN); Amalie Dideriksen (DEN); Christine Majerus (LUX); Amy Pieters (NED); Anna van der Breggen (NED)	+ 21.90"	Lucinda Brand (NED); Leah Kirchmann (CAN); Liane Lippert (GER); Pernille Mathiesen (DEN); Coryn Rivera (USA); Ellen van Dijk (NED)	+ 28.67"

=== Under-23 events ===
Event	Gold		Silver		Bronze	
Men's Under-23 Events
Men's under-23 road race	Marc Hirschi (SUI)	4h 24' 05"	Bjorg Lambrecht (BEL)	+ 15"	Jaakko Hänninen (FIN)	+ 15"
Men's under-23 time trial	Mikkel Bjerg (DEN)	32' 31.05"	Brent Van Moer (BEL)	+ 33.47"	Mathias Norsgaard (DEN)	+ 38.30"

=== Junior events ===
Event	Gold		Silver		Bronze	
Men's Juniors Events
Men's junior road race	Remco Evenepoel (BEL)	3h 03' 49"	Marius Mayrhofer (GER)	+ 1' 25"	Alessandro Fancellu (ITA)	+ 1' 38"
Men's junior time trial	Remco Evenepoel (BEL)	33' 15.24"	Luke Plapp (AUS)	+ 1' 23.66"	Andrea Piccolo (ITA)	+ 1' 37.62"
Women's Juniors Events
Women's junior road race	Laura Stigger (AUT)	1h 56' 26"	Marie Le Net (FRA)	+ 0"	Simone Boilard (CAN)	+ 0"
Women's junior time trial	Rozemarijn Ammerlaan (NED)	27' 02.95"	Camilla Alessio (ITA)	+ 6.80"	Elynor Bäckstedt (GBR)	+ 17.94"

== Medal table ==
Place	Nation	1st place, gold medalist(s)	2nd place, silver medalist(s)	3rd place, bronze medalist(s)	Total
1	Netherlands	3	3	2	8
2	Belgium	3	2	1	6
3	Australia	1	2	0	3
3	Germany	1	2	0	3
5	Denmark	1	0	1	2
6	Austria	1	0	0	1
6	Spain	1	0	0	1
6	Switzerland	1	0	0	1
9	France	0	2	0	2
10	Italy	0	1	3	4
11	Canada	0	0	2	2
12	Finland	0	0	1	1
12	Great Britain	0	0	1	1
12	United States	0	0	1	1
Total		12	12	12	36
