= Mathias Norsgaard =

Danish cyclist (born 1997)

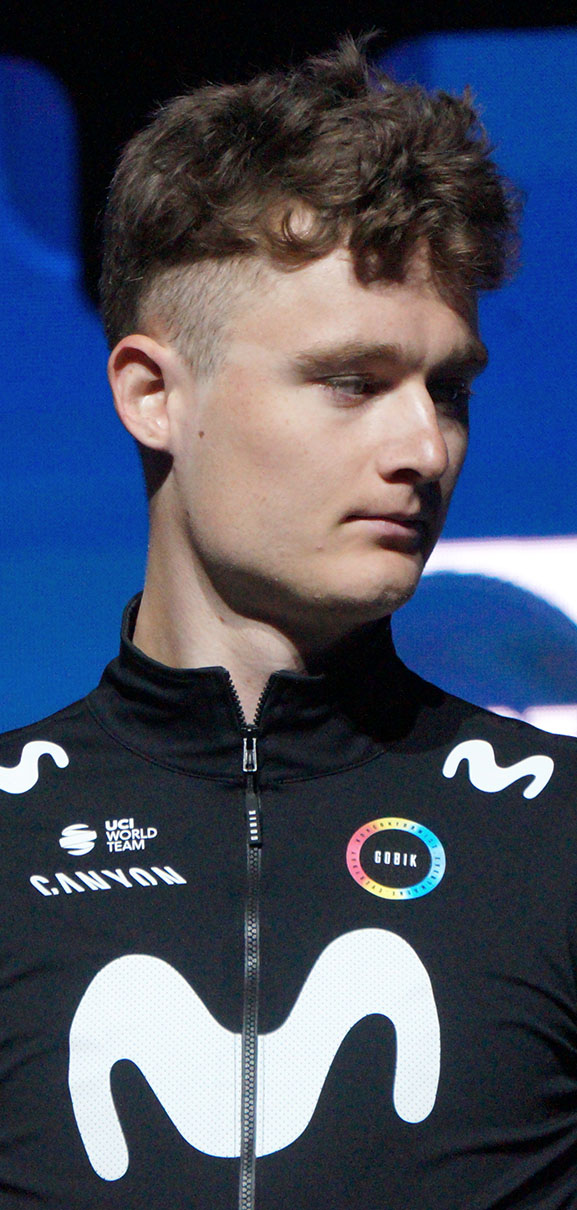
- Norsgaard in 2023

Personal information
- Full name: Mathias Norsgaard Jørgensen
- Born: 5 May 1997 (age 29) Silkeborg, Denmark
- Height: 202 cm (6 ft 8 in)
- Weight: 81 kg (179 lb)

Cycling career
- Sport: Cycling
- Current team: Lidl–Trek
- Discipline: Road
- Role: Rider
- Rider type: Time trialist

Amateur team
- 2015: Roskilde Junior

Professional teams
- 2016: SEG Racing Academy
- 2017: Team Giant–Castelli
- 2018–2019: Riwal CeramicSpeed
- 2020–2025: Movistar Team
- 2026–: Lidl–Trek

Major wins
- One-day races and Classics National Time Trial Championships (2022)
Medal record
Representing Denmark
Men's road bicycle racing
World Championships
Bronze medal – third place	2018 Innsbruck	Under-23 time trial

Mathias Sunekær Norsgaard (born Norsgaard Jørgensen, 5 May 1997) is a Danish cyclist, who currently rides for UCI WorldTeam Lidl–Trek. His sister, Emma Norsgaard Jørgensen, is also a professional cyclist, riding for the women's Lidl–Trek.

== Major results ==
2014
3rd Overall Tour de l'Abitibi

1st Stage 2

4th Trofeo Emilio Paganessi
5th Overall Coupe du Président de la Ville de Grudziądz

1st Stage 1b

2015
1st Prologue Sint-Martinusprijs Kontich
1st Stage 1 Aubel–Thimister–La Gleize
National Junior Road Championships

2nd Time trial
5th Road race

5th Overall Trofeo Karlsberg
6th Overall Coupe du Président de la Ville de Grudziądz

1st Stage 3

6th Overall Grand Prix Rüebliland
7th Road race, UCI Junior Road World Championships
2016
6th Slag om Norg
2017
1st Chrono des Nations Under-23
2nd Duo Normand (with Mikkel Bjerg)
3rd Time trial, National Under-23 Road Championships
8th Rund um den Finanzplatz Eschborn-Frankfurt U23
10th Grand Prix Herning
2018
1st Time trial, National Under-23 Road Championships
1st Chrono des Nations Under-23
3rd Time trial, UCI Road World Under-23 Championships
4th Chrono Champenois
4th Hafjell GP
5th Time trial, National Road Championships
6th Overall Dookoła Mazowsza
7th GP Himmerland Rundt
2019
1st Duo Normand (with Rasmus Quaade)
1st Stage 1 Tour de l'Avenir
2nd Chrono des Nations Under-23
3rd Time trial, National Under-23 Road Championships
4th Time trial, UCI Road World Under-23 Championships
4th Time trial, National Road Championships
5th Hafjell GP
9th Gylne Gutuer
2021
National Road Championships

3rd Road race
4th Time trial

2022
1st Time trial, National Road Championships
2023
1st Grand Prix Herning
9th Overall Boucles de la Mayenne
2024
9th Dwars door Vlaanderen

=== Grand Tour general classification results timeline ===
Grand Tour	2022	2023	2024	2025	2026
Giro d'Italia	—	—	—	—	—
Tour de France	—	—	—	—	—
Vuelta a España	DNF	—	—	—	142
