= Michael O'Loughlin (cyclist) =

Irish cyclist (born 1997)

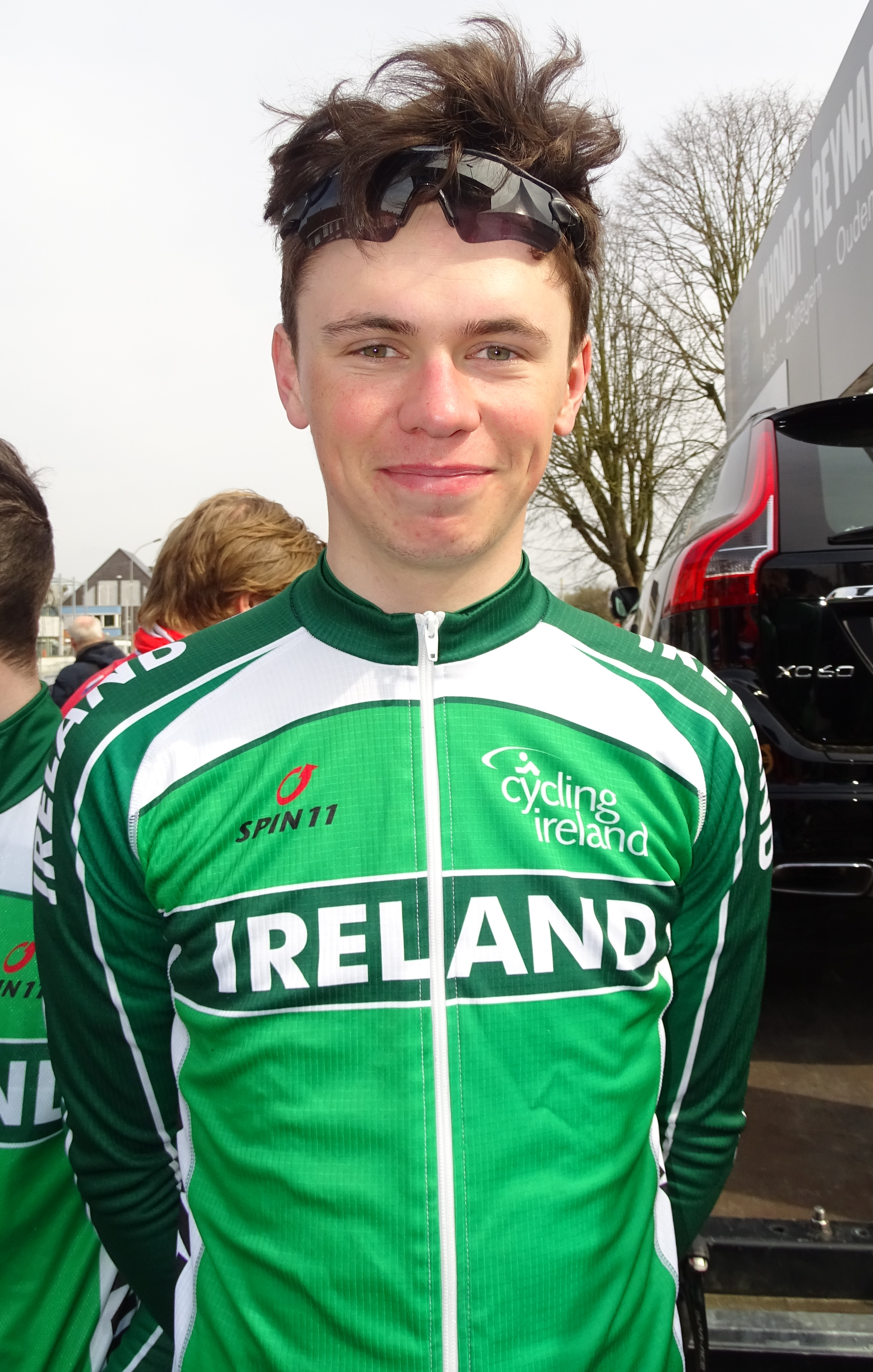
- O'Loughlin in 2016

Personal information
- Full name: Michael O'Loughlin
- Born: 14 February 1997 (age 29) Carrick-on-Suir, Ireland
- Height: 1.86 m (6 ft 1 in)
- Weight: 72 kg (159 lb)

Cycling career
- Sport: Cycling
- Discipline: Road
- Role: Rider

Amateur teams
- 2020: Team UC Nantes Atlantique
- 2022: Bretagne Sud Cyclisme

Professional teams
- 2016–2019: WIGGINS
- 2021: EvoPro Racing

Michael O'Loughlin (born 14 February 1997 in Carrick-on-Suir) is an Irish cyclist, last rode for French amateur team Bretagne Sud Cyclisme.

== Major results ==
2014
National Junior Road Championships

2nd Road race
2nd Time trial

8th Time trial, UCI Junior Road World Championships
2015
1st Road race, National Junior Road Championships
2016
National Road Championships

1st Under-23 road race
3rd Under-23 time trial
3rd Road race
4th Time trial

2017
National Road Championships

1st Under-23 road race
1st Under-23 time trial
4th Time trial

8th Overall An Post Rás

1st Young rider classification

2018
National Road Championships

1st Under-23 time trial
3rd Under-23 road race
4th Road race

2019
1st Time trial, National Under-23 Road Championships
6th Time trial, European Games
