= List of teams and cyclists in the 2021 Tour de France =

List of cyclists

The number of riders per nation that participated in the 2021 Tour de France: 20+ / 10–19 / 2–9 / 1

The following is a list of teams and cyclists that took part in the 2021 Tour de France.

== Teams ==
Twenty-three teams participated in the 2021 Tour de France. All nineteen UCI WorldTeams were entitled and obliged to enter the race, and they were joined by four second-tier UCI ProTeams. Alpecin–Fenix, the best performing UCI ProTeam in 2020, received an automatic invitation, while the other three teams were selected by Amaury Sport Organisation (ASO), the organisers of the Tour. The teams were announced on 4 February 2021.

UCI WorldTeams

- AG2R Citroën Team
- Astana–Premier Tech
- Bora–Hansgrohe
- Cofidis
- Deceuninck–Quick-Step
- EF Education–Nippo
- Groupama–FDJ
- Ineos Grenadiers
- Intermarché–Wanty–Gobert Matériaux
- Israel Start-Up Nation
- Lotto–Soudal
- Movistar Team
- Team Bahrain Victorious
- Team BikeExchange
- Team DSM
- Team Jumbo–Visma
- Team Qhubeka NextHash
- Trek–Segafredo
- UAE Team Emirates

UCI ProTeams

- Alpecin–Fenix
- Arkéa–Samsic
- B&B Hotels p/b KTM
- Team TotalEnergies

== Cyclists ==
Legend
No.	Starting number worn by the rider during the Tour
Pos.	Position in the general classification
Time	Deficit to the winner of the general classification
‡	Denotes riders born on or after 1 January 1996 eligible for the young rider classification
General classification	Denotes the winner of the general classification
Points classification	Denotes the winner of the points classification
Mountains classification	Denotes the winner of the mountains classification
Young rider classification	Denotes the winner of the young rider classification (eligibility indicated by ‡)
Team classification	Denotes riders that represent the winner of the team classification
Super-combativity award	Denotes the winner of the super-combativity award
DNS	Denotes a rider who did not start a stage, followed by the stage before which he withdrew
DNF	Denotes a rider who did not finish a stage, followed by the stage in which he withdrew
DSQ	Denotes a rider who was disqualified from the race, followed by the stage in which this occurred
HD	Denotes a rider finished outside the time limit, followed by the stage in which they did so
COV	Denotes a rider who withdrawn because of COVID-19 either because he tested positive or two members of team tested positive, followed by the stage before which he withdrew
Ages correct as of Saturday 26 June 2021, the date on which the Tour begins

=== By starting number ===
No.	Name	Nationality	Team	Age	Pos.	Time	Ref.
1	Tadej Pogačar ‡	Slovenia	UAE Team Emirates	22	1	82h 56' 36"	
2	Mikkel Bjerg ‡	Denmark	UAE Team Emirates	22	110	+ 3h 42' 21"	
3	Rui Costa	Portugal	UAE Team Emirates	34	77	+ 2h 58' 29"	
4	Davide Formolo	Italy	UAE Team Emirates	28	44	+ 2h 15' 56"	
5	Marc Hirschi ‡	Switzerland	UAE Team Emirates	22	98	+ 3h 24' 38"	
6	Vegard Stake Laengen	Norway	UAE Team Emirates	32	112	+ 3h 43' 33"	
7	Rafał Majka	Poland	UAE Team Emirates	31	34	+ 1h 54' 04"	
8	Brandon McNulty ‡	United States	UAE Team Emirates	23	69	+ 2h 50' 53"	
11	Primož Roglič	Slovenia	Team Jumbo–Visma	31	DNS-9	–	
12	Wout van Aert	Belgium	Team Jumbo–Visma	26	19	+ 57' 02"	
13	Robert Gesink	Netherlands	Team Jumbo–Visma	35	DNF-3	–	
14	Steven Kruijswijk	Netherlands	Team Jumbo–Visma	34	DNF-17	–	
15	Sepp Kuss	United States	Team Jumbo–Visma	26	32	+ 1h 50' 04"	
16	Tony Martin	Germany	Team Jumbo–Visma	36	DNF-11	–	
17	Mike Teunissen	Netherlands	Team Jumbo–Visma	28	76	+ 2h 58' 25"	
18	Jonas Vingegaard ‡	Denmark	Team Jumbo–Visma	24	2	+ 5' 20"	
21	Geraint Thomas	Great Britain	Ineos Grenadiers	35	41	+ 2h 11' 37"	
22	Richard Carapaz	Ecuador	Ineos Grenadiers	28	3	+ 7' 03"	
23	Jonathan Castroviejo	Spain	Ineos Grenadiers	34	23	+ 1h 06' 20"	
24	Tao Geoghegan Hart	Great Britain	Ineos Grenadiers	26	60	+ 2h 37' 02"	
25	Michał Kwiatkowski	Poland	Ineos Grenadiers	31	68	+ 2h 49' 22"	
26	Richie Porte	Australia	Ineos Grenadiers	36	38	+ 2h 06' 39"	
27	Luke Rowe	Great Britain	Ineos Grenadiers	31	HD-11	–	
28	Dylan van Baarle	Netherlands	Ineos Grenadiers	29	54	+ 2h 27' 07"	
31	Chris Froome	Great Britain	Israel Start-Up Nation	36	133	+ 4h 12' 01"	
32	Guillaume Boivin	Canada	Israel Start-Up Nation	32	105	+ 3h 33' 42"	
33	Omer Goldstein ‡	Israel	Israel Start-Up Nation	24	122	+ 3h 55' 26"	
34	André Greipel	Germany	Israel Start-Up Nation	38	125	+ 4h 01' 26"	
35	Reto Hollenstein	Switzerland	Israel Start-Up Nation	35	136	+ 4h 24' 19"	
36	Dan Martin	Ireland	Israel Start-Up Nation	34	40	+ 2h 09' 35"	
37	Michael Woods	Canada	Israel Start-Up Nation	34	DNS-19	–	
38	Rick Zabel	Germany	Israel Start-Up Nation	27	134	+ 4h 13' 07"	
41	Vincenzo Nibali	Italy	Trek–Segafredo	36	DNS-16	–	
42	Julien Bernard	France	Trek–Segafredo	29	37	+ 2h 03' 32"	
43	Kenny Elissonde	France	Trek–Segafredo	29	36	+ 1h 56' 33"	
44	Bauke Mollema	Netherlands	Trek–Segafredo	34	20	+ 1h 02' 18"	
45	Mads Pedersen	Denmark	Trek–Segafredo	25	137	+ 4h 29' 17"	
46	Toms Skujiņš	Latvia	Trek–Segafredo	30	71	+ 2h 52' 56"	
47	Jasper Stuyven	Belgium	Trek–Segafredo	29	39	+ 2h 07' 39"	
48	Edward Theuns	Belgium	Trek–Segafredo	30	104	+ 3h 33' 31"	
51	Julian Alaphilippe	France	Deceuninck–Quick-Step	29	30	+ 1h 43' 06"	
52	Kasper Asgreen	Denmark	Deceuninck–Quick-Step	26	64	+ 2h 43' 41"	
53	Davide Ballerini	Italy	Deceuninck–Quick-Step	26	108	+ 3h 35' 13"	
54	Mattia Cattaneo	Italy	Deceuninck–Quick-Step	30	12	+ 24' 58"	
55	Mark Cavendish	Great Britain	Deceuninck–Quick-Step	36	139	+ 4h 34' 14"	
56	Tim Declercq	Belgium	Deceuninck–Quick-Step	32	141	+ 5h 01' 09"	
57	Dries Devenyns	Belgium	Deceuninck–Quick-Step	37	135	+ 4h 20' 49"	
58	Michael Mørkøv	Denmark	Deceuninck–Quick-Step	36	138	+ 4h 32' 45"	
61	Miguel Ángel López	Colombia	Movistar Team	27	DNS-19	–	
62	Jorge Arcas	Spain	Movistar Team	28	90	+ 3h 14' 41"	
63	Imanol Erviti	Spain	Movistar Team	37	67	+ 2h 49' 07"	
64	Iván García Cortina	Spain	Movistar Team	25	94	+ 3h 21' 25"	
65	Enric Mas	Spain	Movistar Team	26	6	+ 11' 43"	
66	Marc Soler	Spain	Movistar Team	27	DNS-2	–	
67	Alejandro Valverde	Spain	Movistar Team	41	24	+ 1h 07' 50"	
68	Carlos Verona	Spain	Movistar Team	28	101	+ 3h 28' 40"	
71	Peter Sagan	Slovakia	Bora–Hansgrohe	31	DNS-12	–	
72	Emanuel Buchmann	Germany	Bora–Hansgrohe	28	33	+ 1h 51' 05"	
73	Wilco Kelderman	Netherlands	Bora–Hansgrohe	30	5	+ 10' 13"	
74	Patrick Konrad	Austria	Bora–Hansgrohe	29	27	+ 1h 27' 06"	
75	Daniel Oss	Italy	Bora–Hansgrohe	34	115	+ 3h 46' 53"	
76	Nils Politt	Germany	Bora–Hansgrohe	27	50	+ 2h 22' 44"	
77	Lukas Pöstlberger	Austria	Bora–Hansgrohe	29	116	+ 3h 47' 12"	
78	Ide Schelling ‡	Netherlands	Bora–Hansgrohe	23	119	+ 3h 51' 16"	
81	David Gaudu ‡	France	Groupama–FDJ	24	11	+ 21' 50"	
82	Bruno Armirail	France	Groupama–FDJ	27	83	+ 3h 09' 58"	
83	Arnaud Démare	France	Groupama–FDJ	29	HD-9	–	
84	Jacopo Guarnieri	Italy	Groupama–FDJ	33	HD-9	–	
85	Ignatas Konovalovas	Lithuania	Groupama–FDJ	35	DNF-1	–	
86	Stefan Küng	Switzerland	Groupama–FDJ	27	49	+ 2h 22' 03"	
87	Valentin Madouas ‡	France	Groupama–FDJ	24	42	+ 2h 11' 39"	
88	Miles Scotson	Australia	Groupama–FDJ	27	DNF-11	–	
91	Guillaume Martin	France	Cofidis	28	8	+ 15' 33"	
92	Rubén Fernández	Spain	Cofidis	30	84	+ 3h 10' 43"	
93	Simon Geschke	Germany	Cofidis	35	62	+ 2h 38' 51"	
94	Jesús Herrada	Spain	Cofidis	30	87	+ 3h 11' 15"	
95	Christophe Laporte	France	Cofidis	28	91	+ 3h 15' 03"	
96	Anthony Perez	France	Cofidis	30	86	+ 3h 10' 56"	
97	Pierre-Luc Périchon	France	Cofidis	34	92	+ 3h 16' 27"	
98	Jelle Wallays	Belgium	Cofidis	32	131	+ 4h 09' 46"	
101	Mathieu van der Poel	Netherlands	Alpecin–Fenix	26	DNS-9	–	
102	Silvan Dillier	Switzerland	Alpecin–Fenix	30	59	+ 2h 35' 43"	
103	Tim Merlier	Belgium	Alpecin–Fenix	28	DNF-9	–	
104	Xandro Meurisse	Belgium	Alpecin–Fenix	29	29	+ 1h 40' 48"	
105	Jasper Philipsen ‡	Belgium	Alpecin–Fenix	23	109	+ 3h 42' 11"	
106	Jonas Rickaert	Belgium	Alpecin–Fenix	27	95	+ 3h 22' 36"	
107	Kristian Sbaragli	Italy	Alpecin–Fenix	31	106	+ 3h 34' 19"	
108	Petr Vakoč	Czech Republic	Alpecin–Fenix	28	118	+ 3h 51' 06"	
111	Rigoberto Urán	Colombia	EF Education–Nippo	34	10	+ 18' 34"	
112	Stefan Bissegger ‡	Switzerland	EF Education–Nippo	22	103	+ 3h 31' 35"	
113	Ruben Guerreiro	Portugal	EF Education–Nippo	26	18	+ 54' 10"	
114	Sergio Higuita ‡	Colombia	EF Education–Nippo	23	25	+ 1h 09' 16"	
115	Michael Valgren	Denmark	EF Education–Nippo	29	53	+ 2h 26' 16"	
116	Magnus Cort	Denmark	EF Education–Nippo	28	56	+ 2h 30' 23"	
117	Neilson Powless ‡	United States	EF Education–Nippo	24	43	+ 2h 13' 33"	
118	Jonas Rutsch ‡	Germany	EF Education–Nippo	23	55	+ 2h 29' 33"	
121	Benoît Cosnefroy	France	AG2R Citroën Team	25	107	+ 3h 34' 54"	
122	Dorian Godon ‡	France	AG2R Citroën Team	25	75	+ 2h 57' 11"	
123	Oliver Naesen	Belgium	AG2R Citroën Team	30	70	+ 2h 52' 25"	
124	Ben O'Connor	Australia	AG2R Citroën Team	25	4	+ 10' 02"	
125	Aurélien Paret-Peintre ‡	France	AG2R Citroën Team	25	15	+ 39' 09"	
126	Nans Peters	France	AG2R Citroën Team	27	DNF-9	–	
127	Michael Schär	Switzerland	AG2R Citroën Team	34	58	+ 2h 35' 18"	
128	Greg Van Avermaet	Belgium	AG2R Citroën Team	36	97	+ 3h 24' 29"	
131	Warren Barguil	France	Arkéa–Samsic	29	DNS-14	–	
132	Nacer Bouhanni	France	Arkéa–Samsic	30	DNF-15	–	
133	Anthony Delaplace	France	Arkéa–Samsic	31	HD-9	–	
134	Élie Gesbert	France	Arkéa–Samsic	25	61	+ 2h 38' 28"	
135	Daniel McLay	Great Britain	Arkéa–Samsic	29	DNF-11	–	
136	Nairo Quintana	Colombia	Arkéa–Samsic	31	28	+ 1h 33' 11"	
137	Clément Russo	France	Arkéa–Samsic	26	DNF-11	–	
138	Connor Swift	Great Britain	Arkéa–Samsic	25	89	+ 3h 13' 48"	
141	Søren Kragh Andersen	Denmark	Team DSM	26	DNS-14	–	
142	Tiesj Benoot	Belgium	Team DSM	27	DNF-11	–	
143	Cees Bol	Netherlands	Team DSM	25	140	+ 4h 36' 39"	
144	Mark Donovan ‡	Great Britain	Team DSM	22	45	+ 2h 17' 40"	
145	Nils Eekhoff ‡	Netherlands	Team DSM	23	126	+ 4h 02' 44"	
146	Joris Nieuwenhuis ‡	Netherlands	Team DSM	25	128	+ 4h 03' 22"	
147	Casper Pedersen ‡	Denmark	Team DSM	25	111	+ 3h 42' 52"	
148	Jasha Sütterlin	Germany	Team DSM	28	DNF-1	–	
151	Caleb Ewan	Australia	Lotto–Soudal	26	DNS-4	–	
152	Jasper De Buyst	Belgium	Lotto–Soudal	27	DNF-9	–	
153	Thomas De Gendt	Belgium	Lotto–Soudal	34	82	+ 3h 08' 46"	
154	Philippe Gilbert	Belgium	Lotto–Soudal	38	99	+ 3h 27' 22"	
155	Roger Kluge	Germany	Lotto–Soudal	35	DNF-13	–	
156	Harry Sweeny ‡	Australia	Lotto–Soudal	22	85	+ 3h 10' 52"	
157	Tosh Van der Sande	Belgium	Lotto–Soudal	30	DNF-11	–	
158	Brent Van Moer ‡	Belgium	Lotto–Soudal	23	65	+ 2h 43' 49"	
161	Jack Haig	Australia	Team Bahrain Victorious	27	DNF-3	–	
162	Pello Bilbao	Spain	Team Bahrain Victorious	31	9	+ 16' 04"	
163	Sonny Colbrelli	Italy	Team Bahrain Victorious	31	52	+ 2h 24' 39"	
164	Marco Haller	Austria	Team Bahrain Victorious	30	127	+ 4h 03' 01"	
165	Matej Mohorič	Slovenia	Team Bahrain Victorious	26	31	+ 1h 50' 04"	
166	Wout Poels	Netherlands	Team Bahrain Victorious	33	16	+ 50' 35"	
167	Dylan Teuns	Belgium	Team Bahrain Victorious	29	17	+ 51' 40"	
168	Fred Wright ‡	Great Britain	Team Bahrain Victorious	22	96	+ 3h 24' 19"	
171	Michael Matthews	Australia	Team BikeExchange	30	79	+ 3h 03' 30"	
172	Esteban Chaves	Colombia	Team BikeExchange	31	13	+ 37' 48"	
173	Luke Durbridge	Australia	Team BikeExchange	30	100	+ 3h 28' 05"	
174	Lucas Hamilton ‡	Australia	Team BikeExchange	25	DNF-13	–	
175	Amund Grøndahl Jansen	Norway	Team BikeExchange	27	DNS-16	–	
176	Christopher Juul-Jensen	Denmark	Team BikeExchange	31	114	+ 3h 45' 07"	
177	Luka Mezgec	Slovenia	Team BikeExchange	32	102	+ 3h 30' 17"	
178	Simon Yates	Great Britain	Team BikeExchange	28	DNF-13	–	
181	Jakob Fuglsang	Denmark	Astana–Premier Tech	36	DNS-21	–	
182	Alex Aranburu	Spain	Astana–Premier Tech	25	74	+ 2h 56' 44"	
183	Stefan De Bod ‡	South Africa	Astana–Premier Tech	24	HD-9	–	
184	Omar Fraile	Spain	Astana–Premier Tech	30	57	+ 2h 31' 14"	
185	Dmitriy Gruzdev	Kazakhstan	Astana–Premier Tech	35	113	+ 3h 44' 49"	
186	Hugo Houle	Canada	Astana–Premier Tech	30	66	+ 2h 44' 39"	
187	Ion Izagirre	Spain	Astana–Premier Tech	32	26	+ 1h 23' 39"	
188	Alexey Lutsenko	Kazakhstan	Astana–Premier Tech	28	7	+ 12' 23"	
191	Sergio Henao	Colombia	Team Qhubeka NextHash	33	21	+ 1h 03' 12"	
192	Carlos Barbero	Spain	Team Qhubeka NextHash	30	124	+ 4h 00' 20"	
193	Sean Bennett ‡	United States	Team Qhubeka NextHash	25	130	+ 4h 07' 42"	
194	Victor Campenaerts	Belgium	Team Qhubeka NextHash	29	DNF-11	–	
195	Simon Clarke	Australia	Team Qhubeka NextHash	34	123	+ 3h 56' 08"	
196	Nic Dlamini	South Africa	Team Qhubeka NextHash	25	HD-9	–	
197	Michael Gogl	Austria	Team Qhubeka NextHash	27	DNS-13	–	
198	Max Walscheid	Germany	Team Qhubeka NextHash	28	121	+ 3h 53' 05"	
201	Pierre Latour	France	Team TotalEnergies	27	47	+ 2h 19' 36"	
202	Edvald Boasson Hagen	Norway	Team TotalEnergies	34	HD-15	–	
203	Jérémy Cabot	France	Team TotalEnergies	29	132	+ 4h 11' 35"	
204	Víctor de la Parte	Spain	Team TotalEnergies	35	72	+ 2h 54' 28"	
205	Fabien Doubey	France	Team TotalEnergies	27	78	+ 3h 02' 45"	
206	Cristián Rodríguez	Spain	Team TotalEnergies	26	46	+ 2h 19' 31"	
207	Julien Simon	France	Team TotalEnergies	35	129	+ 4h 05' 49"	
208	Anthony Turgis	France	Team TotalEnergies	27	73	+ 2h 55' 51"	
211	Louis Meintjes	South Africa	Intermarché–Wanty–Gobert Matériaux	29	14	+ 38' 09"	
212	Jan Bakelants	Belgium	Intermarché–Wanty–Gobert Matériaux	35	48	+ 2h 21' 30"	
213	Jonas Koch	Germany	Intermarché–Wanty–Gobert Matériaux	28	DNS-10	–	
214	Lorenzo Rota	Italy	Intermarché–Wanty–Gobert Matériaux	26	63	+ 2h 39' 57"	
215	Boy van Poppel	Netherlands	Intermarché–Wanty–Gobert Matériaux	33	117	+ 3h 50' 25"	
216	Danny van Poppel	Netherlands	Intermarché–Wanty–Gobert Matériaux	27	120	+ 3h 52' 53"	
217	Loïc Vliegen	Belgium	Intermarché–Wanty–Gobert Matériaux	27	HD-9	–	
218	Georg Zimmermann ‡	Germany	Intermarché–Wanty–Gobert Matériaux	23	80	+ 3h 05' 48"	
221	Bryan Coquard	France	B&B Hotels p/b KTM	29	HD-9	–	
222	Cyril Barthe ‡	France	B&B Hotels p/b KTM	25	88	+ 3h 12' 31"	
223	Franck Bonnamour	France	B&B Hotels p/b KTM	26	22	+ 1h 04' 35"	
224	Maxime Chevalier ‡	France	B&B Hotels p/b KTM	22	93	+ 3h 16' 54"	
225	Cyril Gautier	France	B&B Hotels p/b KTM	33	81	+ 3h 08' 30"	
226	Cyril Lemoine	France	B&B Hotels p/b KTM	38	DNF-1	–	
227	Quentin Pacher	France	B&B Hotels p/b KTM	29	35	+ 1h 55' 34"	
228	Pierre Rolland	France	B&B Hotels p/b KTM	34	51	+ 2h 23' 11"	

=== By team ===
UAE Team Emirates (UAD)
No.	Rider	Pos.
1	Tadej Pogačar (SLO)	1
2	Mikkel Bjerg (DEN)	110
3	Rui Costa (POR)	77
4	Davide Formolo (ITA)	44
5	Marc Hirschi (SUI)	98
6	Vegard Stake Laengen (NOR)	112
7	Rafał Majka (POL)	34
8	Brandon McNulty (USA)	69
Directeur sportif: Andrej Hauptman/Simone Pedrazzini

Team Jumbo–Visma (TJV)
No.	Rider	Pos.
11	Primož Roglič (SLO)	DNS-9
12	Wout van Aert (BEL)	19
13	Robert Gesink (NED)	DNF-3
14	Steven Kruijswijk (NED)	DNF-17
15	Sepp Kuss (USA)	32
16	Tony Martin (GER)	DNF-11
17	Mike Teunissen (NED)	76
18	Jonas Vingegaard (DEN)	2
Directeur sportif: Grischa Niermann/Frans Maassen

Ineos Grenadiers (IGD)
No.	Rider	Pos.
21	Geraint Thomas (GBR)	41
22	Richard Carapaz (ECU)	3
23	Jonathan Castroviejo (ESP)	23
24	Tao Geoghegan Hart (GBR)	60
25	Michał Kwiatkowski (POL)	68
26	Richie Porte (AUS)	38
27	Luke Rowe (GBR)	HD-11
28	Dylan van Baarle (NED)	54
Directeur sportif: Servais Knaven/Gabriel Rasch/Xabier Zandio

Israel Start-Up Nation (ISN)
No.	Rider	Pos.
31	Chris Froome (GBR)	133
32	Guillaume Boivin (CAN)	105
33	Omer Goldstein (ISR)	122
34	André Greipel (GER)	125
35	Reto Hollenstein (SUI)	136
36	Dan Martin (IRL)	40
37	Michael Woods (CAN)	DNS-19
38	Rick Zabel (GER)	134
Directeur sportif: Oscar Guerrero Celaya/Rik Verbrugghe

Trek–Segafredo (TFS)
No.	Rider	Pos.
41	Vincenzo Nibali (ITA)	DNS-16
42	Julien Bernard (FRA)	37
43	Kenny Elissonde (FRA)	36
44	Bauke Mollema (NED)	20
45	Mads Pedersen (DEN)	137
46	Toms Skujiņš (LAT)	71
47	Jasper Stuyven (BEL)	39
48	Edward Theuns (BEL)	104
Directeur sportif: Kim Andersen/Steven de Jongh

Deceuninck–Quick-Step (DQT)
No.	Rider	Pos.
51	Julian Alaphilippe (FRA)	30
52	Kasper Asgreen (DEN)	64
53	Davide Ballerini (ITA)	108
54	Mattia Cattaneo (ITA)	12
55	Mark Cavendish (GBR)	139
56	Tim Declercq (BEL)	141
57	Dries Devenyns (BEL)	135
58	Michael Mørkøv (DEN)	138
Directeur sportif: Tom Steels/Wilfried Peeters

Movistar Team (MOV)
No.	Rider	Pos.
61	Miguel Ángel López (COL)	DNS-19
62	Jorge Arcas (ESP)	90
63	Imanol Erviti (ESP)	67
64	Iván García Cortina (ESP)	94
65	Enric Mas (ESP)	6
66	Marc Soler (ESP)	DNS-2
67	Alejandro Valverde (ESP)	24
68	Carlos Verona (ESP)	101
Directeur sportif: José Luis Arrieta/Jose Luis Jaimerana/Francisco Javier Vila

Bora–Hansgrohe (BOH)
No.	Rider	Pos.
71	Peter Sagan (SVK)	DNS-12
72	Emanuel Buchmann (GER)	33
73	Wilco Kelderman (NED)	5
74	Patrick Konrad (AUT)	27
75	Daniel Oss (ITA)	115
76	Nils Politt (GER)	50
77	Lukas Pöstlberger (AUT)	116
78	Ide Schelling (NED)	119
Directeur sportif: Ján Valach/Enrico Poitschke

Groupama–FDJ (GFC)
No.	Rider	Pos.
81	David Gaudu (FRA)	11
82	Bruno Armirail (FRA)	83
83	Arnaud Démare (FRA)	HD-9
84	Jacopo Guarnieri (ITA)	HD-9
85	Ignatas Konovalovas (LTU)	DNF-1
86	Stefan Küng (SUI)	49
87	Valentin Madouas (FRA)	42
88	Miles Scotson (AUS)	DNF-11
Directeur sportif: Thierry Bricaud/Frédéric Guesdon

Cofidis (COF)
No.	Rider	Pos.
91	Guillaume Martin (FRA)	8
92	Rubén Fernández (ESP)	84
93	Simon Geschke (GER)	62
94	Jesús Herrada (ESP)	87
95	Christophe Laporte (FRA)	91
96	Anthony Perez (FRA)	86
97	Pierre-Luc Périchon (FRA)	92
98	Jelle Wallays (BEL)	131
Directeur sportif: Christian Guiberteau/Thierry Marichal

Alpecin–Fenix (AFC)
No.	Rider	Pos.
101	Mathieu van der Poel (NED)	DNS-9
102	Silvan Dillier (SUI)	59
103	Tim Merlier (BEL)	DNF-9
104	Xandro Meurisse (BEL)	29
105	Jasper Philipsen (BEL)	109
106	Jonas Rickaert (BEL)	95
107	Kristian Sbaragli (ITA)	106
108	Petr Vakoč (CZE)	118
Directeur sportif: Christoph Roodhooft/Michel Cornelisse

EF Education–Nippo (EFN)
No.	Rider	Pos.
111	Rigoberto Urán (COL)	10
112	Stefan Bissegger (SUI)	103
113	Magnus Cort (DEN)	56
114	Ruben Guerreiro (POR)	18
115	Sergio Higuita (COL)	25
116	Neilson Powless (USA)	43
117	Jonas Rutsch (GER)	55
118	Michael Valgren (DEN)	53
Directeur sportif: Andreas Klier/Tom Southam/Charles Wegelius

AG2R Citroën Team (ALM)
No.	Rider	Pos.
121	Benoît Cosnefroy (FRA)	107
122	Dorian Godon (FRA)	75
123	Oliver Naesen (BEL)	70
124	Ben O'Connor (AUS)	4
125	Aurélien Paret-Peintre (FRA)	15
126	Nans Peters (FRA)	DNF-9
127	Michael Schär (SUI)	58
128	Greg Van Avermaet (BEL)	97
Directeur sportif: Didier Jannel/Julien Jurdie

Arkéa–Samsic (ARK)
No.	Rider	Pos.
131	Warren Barguil (FRA)	DNS-14
132	Nacer Bouhanni (FRA)	DNF-15
133	Anthony Delaplace (FRA)	HD-9
134	Élie Gesbert (FRA)	61
135	Daniel McLay (GBR)	DNF-11
136	Nairo Quintana (COL)	28
137	Clément Russo (FRA)	DNF-11
138	Connor Swift (GBR)	89
Directeur sportif: Sébastien Hinault/Yvon Ledanois

Team DSM (DSM)
No.	Rider	Pos.
141	Søren Kragh Andersen (DEN)	DNS-14
142	Tiesj Benoot (BEL)	DNF-11
143	Cees Bol (NED)	140
144	Mark Donovan (GBR)	45
145	Nils Eekhoff (NED)	126
146	Joris Nieuwenhuis (NED)	128
147	Casper Pedersen (DEN)	111
148	Jasha Sütterlin (GER)	DNF-1
Directeur sportif: Luke Roberts/Marc Reef

Lotto–Soudal (LTS)
No.	Rider	Pos.
151	Caleb Ewan (AUS)	DNS-4
152	Jasper De Buyst (BEL)	DNF-9
153	Thomas De Gendt (BEL)	82
154	Philippe Gilbert (BEL)	99
155	Roger Kluge (GER)	DNF-13
156	Harry Sweeny (AUS)	85
157	Tosh Van der Sande (BEL)	DNF-11
158	Brent Van Moer (BEL)	65
Directeur sportif: Herman Frison/Mario Aerts

Team Bahrain Victorious (TBV)
No.	Rider	Pos.
161	Jack Haig (AUS)	DNF-3
162	Pello Bilbao (ESP)	9
163	Sonny Colbrelli (ITA)	52
164	Marco Haller (AUT)	127
165	Matej Mohorič (SLO)	31
166	Wout Poels (NED)	16
167	Dylan Teuns (BEL)	17
168	Fred Wright (GBR)	96
Directeur sportif: Rolf Aldag/Xavier Florencio

Team BikeExchange (BEX)
No.	Rider	Pos.
171	Michael Matthews (AUS)	79
172	Esteban Chaves (COL)	13
173	Luke Durbridge (AUS)	100
174	Amund Grøndahl Jansen (NOR)	DNS-16
175	Lucas Hamilton (AUS)	DNF-13
176	Christopher Juul-Jensen (DEN)	114
177	Luka Mezgec (SLO)	102
178	Simon Yates (GBR)	DNF-13
Directeur sportif: Mathew Hayman/David McPartland/Andrew Smith/Matthew White

Astana–Premier Tech (APT)
No.	Rider	Pos.
181	Jakob Fuglsang (DEN)	DNS-21
182	Alex Aranburu (ESP)	74
183	Stefan De Bod (RSA)	HD-9
184	Omar Fraile (ESP)	57
185	Dmitriy Gruzdev (KAZ)	113
186	Hugo Houle (CAN)	66
187	Ion Izagirre (ESP)	26
188	Alexey Lutsenko (KAZ)	7
Directeur sportif: Dmitriy Fofonov/Steve Bauer

Team Qhubeka NextHash (TQA)
No.	Rider	Pos.
191	Sergio Henao (COL)	21
192	Carlos Barbero (ESP)	124
193	Sean Bennett (USA)	130
194	Victor Campenaerts (BEL)	DNF-11
195	Simon Clarke (AUS)	123
196	Nic Dlamini (RSA)	HD-9
197	Michael Gogl (AUT)	DNS-13
198	Max Walscheid (GER)	121
Directeur sportif: Lars Michaelsen/Gabriele Missaglia/Gino Vanoudenhove

Team TotalEnergies (TDE)
No.	Rider	Pos.
201	Pierre Latour (FRA)	47
202	Edvald Boasson Hagen (NOR)	HD-15
203	Jérémy Cabot (FRA)	132
204	Víctor de la Parte (ESP)	72
205	Fabien Doubey (FRA)	78
206	Cristián Rodríguez (ESP)	46
207	Julien Simon (FRA)	129
208	Anthony Turgis (FRA)	73
Directeur sportif: Benoit Genauzeau/Lylian Lebreton

Intermarché–Wanty–Gobert Matériaux (IWG)
No.	Rider	Pos.
211	Louis Meintjes (RSA)	14
212	Jan Bakelants (BEL)	48
213	Jonas Koch (GER)	DNS-10
214	Boy van Poppel (NED)	117
215	Danny van Poppel (NED)	120
216	Lorenzo Rota (ITA)	63
217	Loïc Vliegen (BEL)	HD-9
218	Georg Zimmermann (GER)	80
Directeur sportif: Steven De Neef/Hilaire Van Der Schueren

B&B Hotels p/b KTM (BBK)
No.	Rider	Pos.
221	Bryan Coquard (FRA)	HD-9
222	Cyril Barthe (FRA)	88
223	Franck Bonnamour (FRA)	22
224	Maxime Chevalier (FRA)	93
225	Cyril Gautier (FRA)	81
226	Cyril Lemoine (FRA)	DNF-1
227	Quentin Pacher (FRA)	35
228	Pierre Rolland (FRA)	51
Directeur sportif: Jimmy Engoulvent/Yvonnick Bolgiani

=== By nationality ===
Country	No. of riders	In competition	Stage wins
Australia	10	6	1 (Ben O'Connor)
Austria	4	3	1 (Patrick Konrad)
Belgium	22	16	5 (Tim Merlier, Dylan Teuns, Wout van Aert x3)
Canada	3	2	
Colombia	6	5	
Czechia	1	1	
Denmark	11	9	
Ecuador	1	1	
France	33	25	1 (Julian Alaphilippe)
Germany	12	8	1 (Nils Politt)
Great Britain	10	7	4 (Mark Cavendish x4)
Ireland	1	1	
Israel	1	1	
Italy	9	7	
Kazakhstan	2	2	
Latvia	1	1	
Lithuania	1	0	
Netherlands	14	11	2 (Mathieu van der Poel, Bauke Mollema)
Norway	3	1	
Poland	2	2	
Portugal	2	2	
Slovakia	1	0	
Slovenia	4	3	5 (Tadej Pogačar x3, Matej Mohorič x2)
South Africa	3	1	
Spain	17	16	
Switzerland	6	6	
United States	4	4	1 (Sepp Kuss)
Total	184	141	21
