= 2021 Tour de France, Stage 1 to Stage 11 =

The 2021 Tour de France was the 108th edition of Tour de France, one of cycling's Grand Tours. The Tour began in Brest, France on 26 June, and Stage 11 from Sorgues to Malaucène occurred on 7 July. The race finished on the Champs-Élysées in Paris on 18 July.

== Classification standings ==
Legend
A yellow jersey.	Denotes the leader of the general classification	A white jersey with red polka dots.	Denotes the leader of the mountains classification
A green jersey.	Denotes the leader of the points classification	A white jersey.	Denotes the leader of the young rider classification
A white jersey with a yellow number bib.	Denotes the leader of the team classification	A white jersey with a red number bib.	Denotes the winner of the combativity award

== Stage 1 ==
26 June 2021 – Brest to Landerneau, 197.8 km (122.9 mi)

Countdown and start of Stage 1

The first stage of the Tour featured a hilly course from Brest to Landerneau. Brest hosted the Grand Départ for the fourth time in the Tour's history, with the last time being in 2008. The course featured six categorised climbs, giving the riders plenty of opportunities to take points for the mountains classification. There was also an intermediate sprint in Brasparts with 62.7 kilometres (39.0 mi) to go. The finale featured an uphill finish, with the riders finishing atop the Côte de la Fosse aux Loups, at 3 kilometres (1.9 mi) long with an average gradient of 5.7 percent. The first 500 metres of the climb averaged 9.4 percent before gradually easing towards the top.

Several attacks marked the start of the stage before a group of five broke away from the peloton. The break included Franck Bonnamour (B&B Hotels p/b KTM), Ide Schelling (Bora–Hansgrohe), Anthony Perez (Cofidis), Danny van Poppel (Intermarché–Wanty–Gobert Matériaux), and Cristián Rodríguez (Team TotalEnergies). Connor Swift (Arkéa–Samsic) eventually made it across to create a six-man group up front. The peloton let the break gain a maximum advantage of almost four minutes before the chase began. The break worked together before Schelling attacked on the fourth climb of the day, the Côte de Stang ar Garront. He quickly began to build his advantage over the rest of the break, which was eventually caught with around 66 kilometres (41 mi) to go, just ahead of the intermediate sprint. Schelling took maximum points at the intermediate sprint while Caleb Ewan (Lotto–Soudal) outsprinted Peter Sagan (Bora–Hansgrohe) for second.

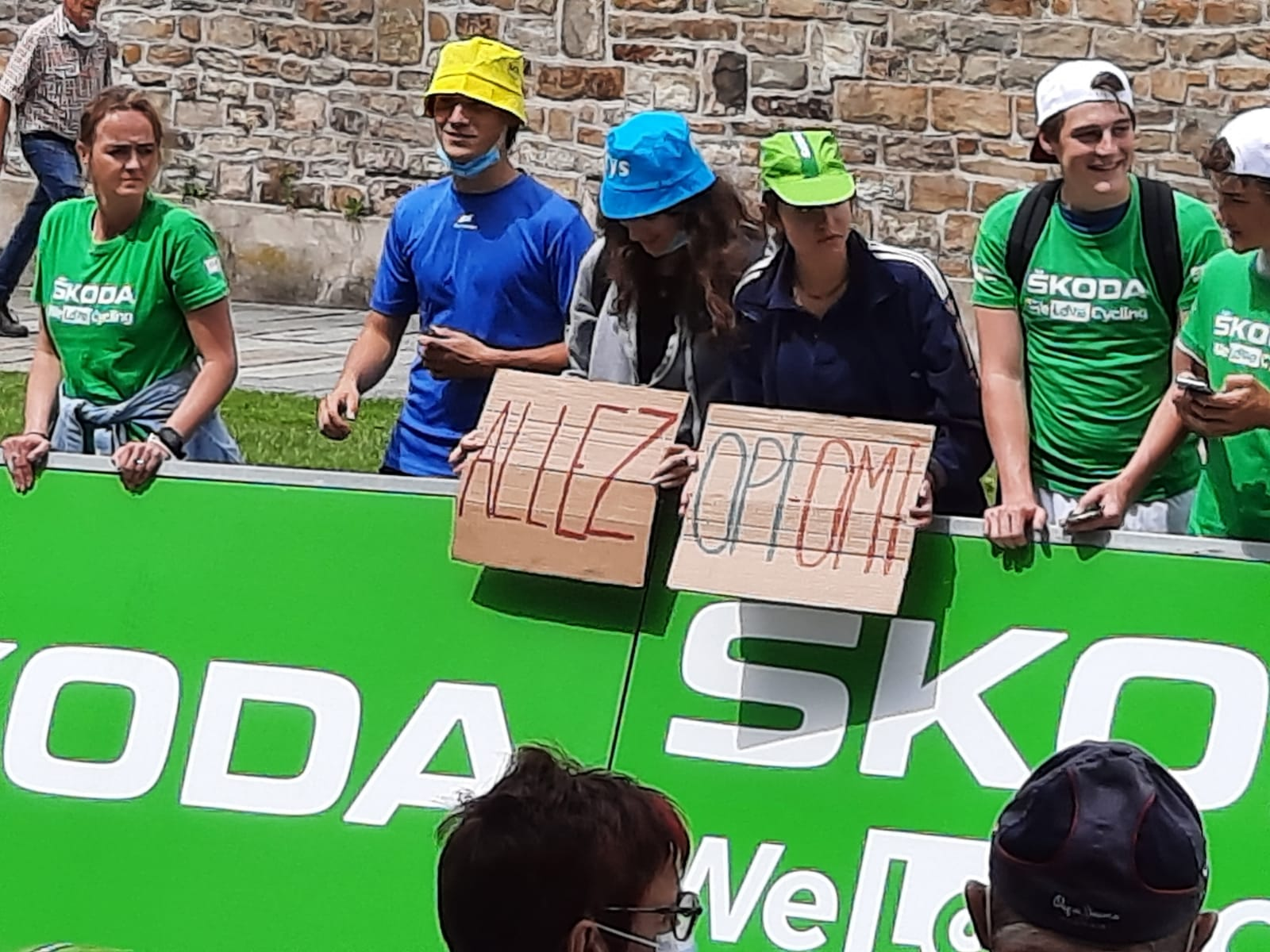
Spectators in Stage 4 holding signs with the same text (“Allez opi omi”) as on the sign causing Tony Martin to crash

With 45 kilometres (28 mi) to go, Tony Martin (Team Jumbo–Visma) was brought down by a spectator who was holding a sign, causing a crash which brought down most of the peloton. The crash caused the abandonment of Jasha Sütterlin (Team DSM) due to injury while the peloton briefly neutralised the race to allow the riders who were held back to latch back on. Following a regrouping in the peloton, Schelling was swept up with around 27 kilometres (17 mi) to go, but not before taking enough points to take the lead in the mountains classification. With 7.5 kilometres (4.7 mi) to go, a touch of wheels caused another crash which brought down several riders, with Cyril Lemoine (B&B Hotels p/b KTM) and Ignatas Konovalovas (Groupama–FDJ) also crashing out of the race. Four-time Tour winner Chris Froome was also among the riders to crash heavily but he managed to get up and slowly make his way across the finish line, eventually finishing over 13 minutes in arrears. The riders soon battled for position at the front of the peloton as they reached the foot of the final climb of the day. With 2.3 kilometres (1.4 mi) to go, Dries Devenyns took to the front to lead out an attack for team leader Julian Alaphilippe (Deceuninck–Quick-Step), who immediately created a gap over the rest of the reduced peloton while Pierre Latour (Team TotalEnergies) unsuccessfully tried to bridge over to Alaphilippe. The top two riders from the previous year's Tour, Tadej Pogačar (UAE Team Emirates) and Primož Roglič (Team Jumbo–Visma), also tried to bridge over but they were swept up. Alaphilippe maintained his advantage all the way to the line to take the first maillot jaune of this year's Tour. Eight seconds behind, Michael Matthews (Team BikeExchange) won the sprint for second while Roglič finished third to take four crucial bonus seconds in the fight for the GC.

Race organisers stated they were happy to have fans beside the road, but rider safety is paramount, adding that they planned to sue the spectator who caused the crash. The next day, French police said they were initiating a manhunt. News outlets reported on 30 June that the person concerned, a 30-year old French woman, had turned herself in and was arrested, and that a charge of "involuntarily causing injury" was being considered, an offence that carries a fine of €1,500. Due to significant interest in the incident, organisers withdrew their suit against the person on 1 July with general director Christian Prudhomme saying that the incident "has been blown out of proportion." The Cyclistes Professionnels Associés ended up filling a suit against the fan.

The woman, who was not identified, went on trial in Brest in October 2021. In December, she was ordered to pay a combined fine of €1,201.

Stage 1 Result
Rank	Rider	Team	Time
1	Julian Alaphilippe (FRA)	Deceuninck–Quick-Step	4h 39' 05"
2	Michael Matthews (AUS)	Team BikeExchange	+ 8"
3	Primož Roglič (SLO)	Team Jumbo–Visma	+ 8"
4	Jack Haig (AUS)	Team Bahrain Victorious	+ 8"
5	Wilco Kelderman (NED)	Bora–Hansgrohe	+ 8"
6	Tadej Pogačar (SLO)	UAE Team Emirates	+ 8"
7	David Gaudu (FRA)	Groupama–FDJ	+ 8"
8	Sergio Higuita (COL)	EF Education–Nippo	+ 8"
9	Bauke Mollema (NED)	Trek–Segafredo	+ 8"
10	Geraint Thomas (GBR)	INEOS Grenadiers	+ 8"

General classification after Stage 1
Rank	Rider	Team	Time
1	Julian Alaphilippe (FRA)	Deceuninck–Quick-Step	4h 38' 55"
2	Michael Matthews (AUS)	Team BikeExchange	+ 12"
3	Primož Roglič (SLO)	Team Jumbo–Visma	+ 14"
4	Jack Haig (AUS)	Team Bahrain Victorious	+ 18"
5	Wilco Kelderman (NED)	Bora–Hansgrohe	+ 18"
6	Tadej Pogačar (SLO)	UAE Team Emirates	+ 18"
7	David Gaudu (FRA)	Groupama–FDJ	+ 18"
8	Sergio Higuita (COL)	EF Education–Nippo	+ 18"
9	Bauke Mollema (NED)	Trek–Segafredo	+ 18"
10	Geraint Thomas (GBR)	INEOS Grenadiers	+ 18"

== Stage 2 ==
27 June 2021 – Perros-Guirec to Mûr-de-Bretagne (Guerlédan), 183.5 km (114.0 mi)

Stage 2

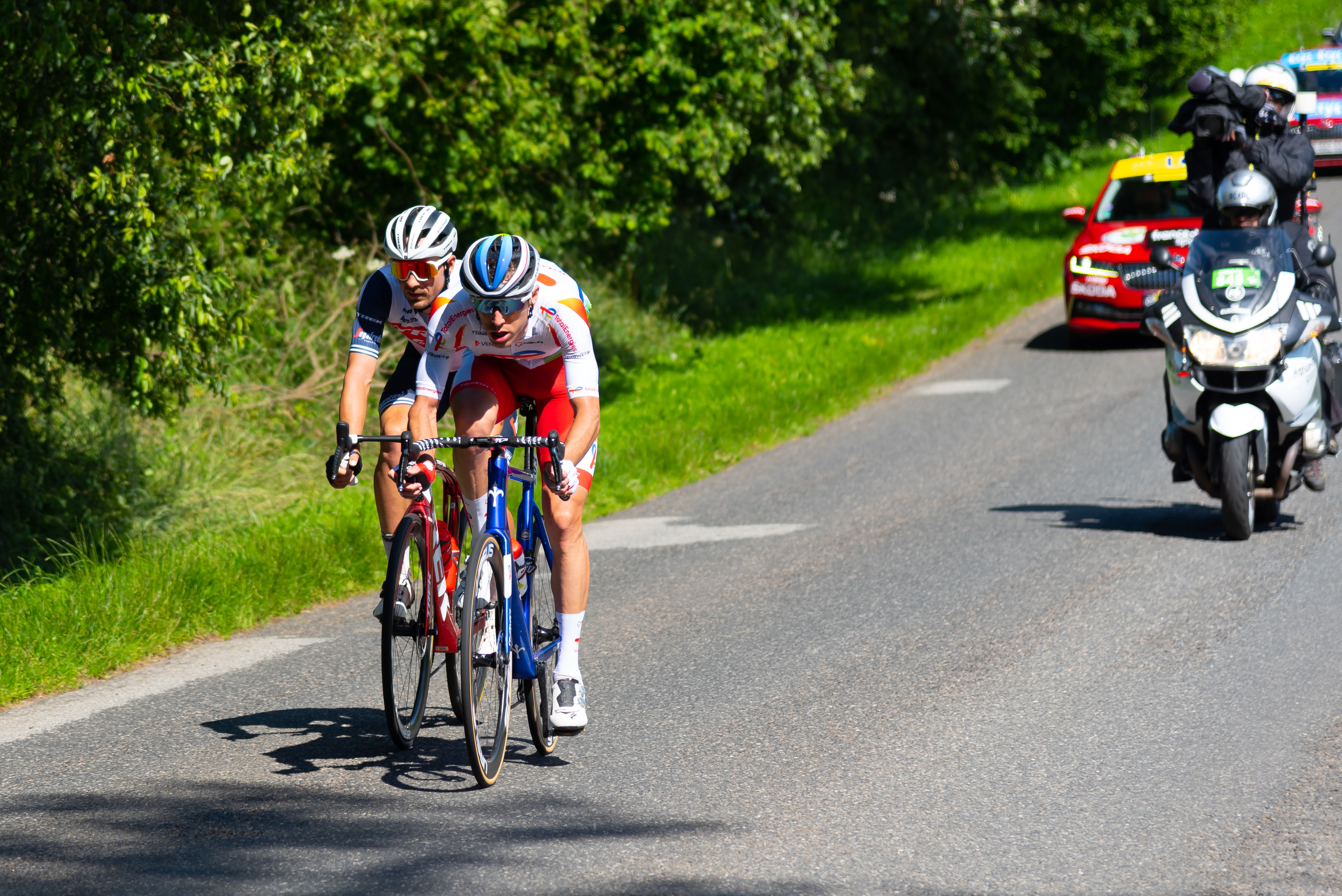
On the third climb of the day, Edward Theuns (left) attacked from the break with Jérémy Cabot.

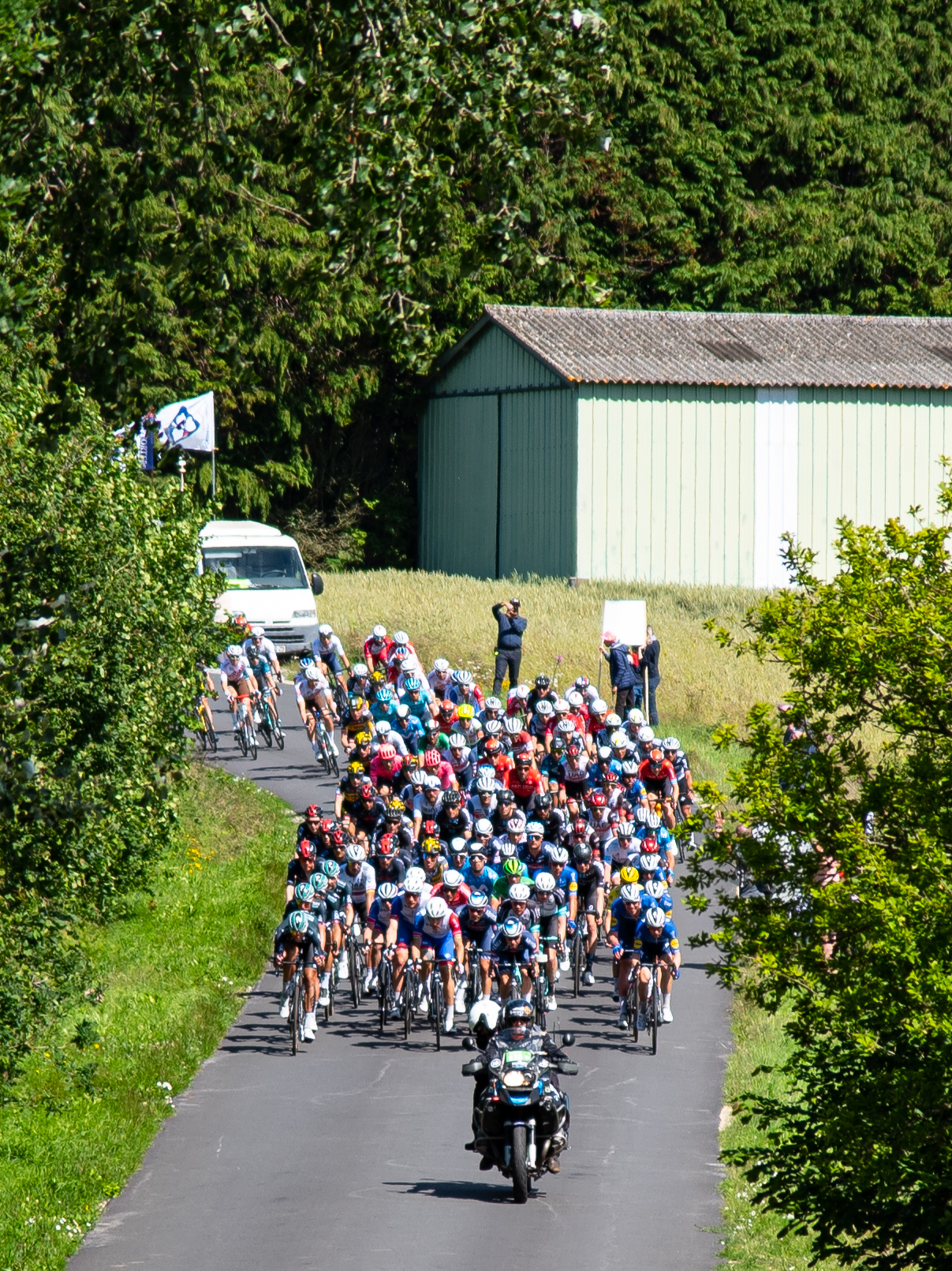
Peloton in Saint-Hervé

For the second day in a row, the riders faced a hilly course with another uphill finish. This time, the riders finished atop the climb of Mûr-de-Bretagne, which featured on the route for the fourth time in the last ten years. There were six categorised climbs on the route and the intermediate sprint took place in Plouha after 85 kilometres (53 mi). The climb of Mûr-de-Bretagne is 2 kilometres (1.2 mi) long with an average gradient of 6.9 percent. The first kilometre averages at 9.8 percent before easing towards the top. The climb is featured twice on the route, with the riders cresting the top of the climb for the first time with 15.3 kilometres (9.5 mi) left and then at the finish. The first ascent also offered eight, five, and two bonus seconds to the first three riders to crest the top.

As a result of injuries inflicted from the crashes in the previous day, Marc Soler (Movistar Team) became the fourth rider to abandon the Tour. After several attacks marked the start of the stage, six riders eventually broke away from the peloton, including the king of the mountains leader, Ide Schelling (Bora–Hansgrohe). The sextet was allowed to build a gap of around four minutes before Deceuninck–Quick-Step began to chase the break. Schelling and his closest rival in the mountains classification, Anthony Perez (Cofidis), each took a point at the first two climbs of the day. After the six breakaway riders took the maximum points at the intermediate sprint, Caleb Ewan (Lotto–Soudal) outsprinted Mark Cavendish (Deceuninck–Quick-Step) to take more points in the battle for the green jersey. On the third climb of the day, Edward Theuns (Trek–Segafredo) attacked from the break, with Jérémy Cabot (Team TotalEnergies) the only other rider to respond to his attack. However, the duo's advantage gradually decreased as the riders reached the foot of the climb of Mûr-de-Bretagne for the first time.

As soon as the duo was caught at the foot of Mûr-de-Bretagne, Mathieu van der Poel (Alpecin–Fenix) attacked from the peloton. He would build an advantage of around 13 seconds before UAE Team Emirates gradually decreased his advantage. He would pick up the eight bonus seconds at the top while Tadej Pogačar (UAE Team Emirates) outsprinted Primož Roglič (Team Jumbo–Visma) to take back three seconds from his fellow Slovenian. van der Poel was caught at the top before INEOS Grenadiers took over at the front of the peloton. As the riders reached the bottom of Mûr-de-Bretagne for the second time, Davide Formolo (UAE Team Emirates) accelerated, building a small gap before Nairo Quintana (Arkéa–Samsic) produced a counterattack of his own. Sonny Colbrelli (Team Bahrain Victorious) also attacked just under the flamme rouge before van der Poel made his decisive move with 800 metres to go. He continued to build his lead before soloing across the finish line. Pogačar, Roglič, and Wilco Kelderman (Bora–Hansgrohe) crossed the line six seconds in arrears, with Pogačar outsprinting Roglič for second to take back two more seconds from his compatriot. The remnants of the reduced peloton crossed the line a further two seconds in arrears. One notable absence in this group was Geraint Thomas (INEOS Grenadiers), who came home at 23 seconds behind van der Poel and 17 seconds behind the two Slovenians. In the GC, van der Poel took enough time to take the maillot jaune, with Julian Alaphilippe (Deceuninck–Quick-Step) dropping to second at eight seconds back. Pogačar moved up to third at 13 seconds behind and one second ahead of Roglič, who dropped to fourth. van der Poel also took the lead in the mountains classification after he took maximum points on both ascents of Mûr-de-Bretagne.

Stage 2 Result
Rank	Rider	Team	Time
1	Mathieu van der Poel (NED)	Alpecin–Fenix	4h 18' 30"
2	Tadej Pogačar (SLO)	UAE Team Emirates	+ 6"
3	Primož Roglič (SLO)	Team Jumbo–Visma	+ 6"
4	Wilco Kelderman (NED)	Bora–Hansgrohe	+ 6"
5	Julian Alaphilippe (FRA)	Deceuninck–Quick-Step	+ 8"
6	Bauke Mollema (NED)	Trek–Segafredo	+ 8"
7	Jonas Vingegaard (DEN)	Team Jumbo–Visma	+ 8"
8	Sergio Higuita (COL)	EF Education–Nippo	+ 8"
9	Pierre Latour (FRA)	Team TotalEnergies	+ 8"
10	Jack Haig (AUS)	Team Bahrain Victorious	+ 8"

General classification after Stage 2
Rank	Rider	Team	Time
1	Mathieu van der Poel (NED)	Alpecin–Fenix	8h 57' 25"
2	Julian Alaphilippe (FRA)	Deceuninck–Quick-Step	+ 8"
3	Tadej Pogačar (SLO)	UAE Team Emirates	+ 13"
4	Primož Roglič (SLO)	Team Jumbo–Visma	+ 14"
5	Wilco Kelderman (NED)	Bora–Hansgrohe	+ 24"
6	Jack Haig (AUS)	Team Bahrain Victorious	+ 26"
7	Bauke Mollema (NED)	Trek–Segafredo	+ 26"
8	Sergio Higuita (COL)	EF Education–Nippo	+ 26"
9	Jonas Vingegaard (DEN)	Team Jumbo–Visma	+ 26"
10	David Gaudu (FRA)	Groupama–FDJ	+ 26"

== Stage 3 ==
28 June 2021 – Lorient to Pontivy, 182.9 km (113.6 mi)

Stage 3

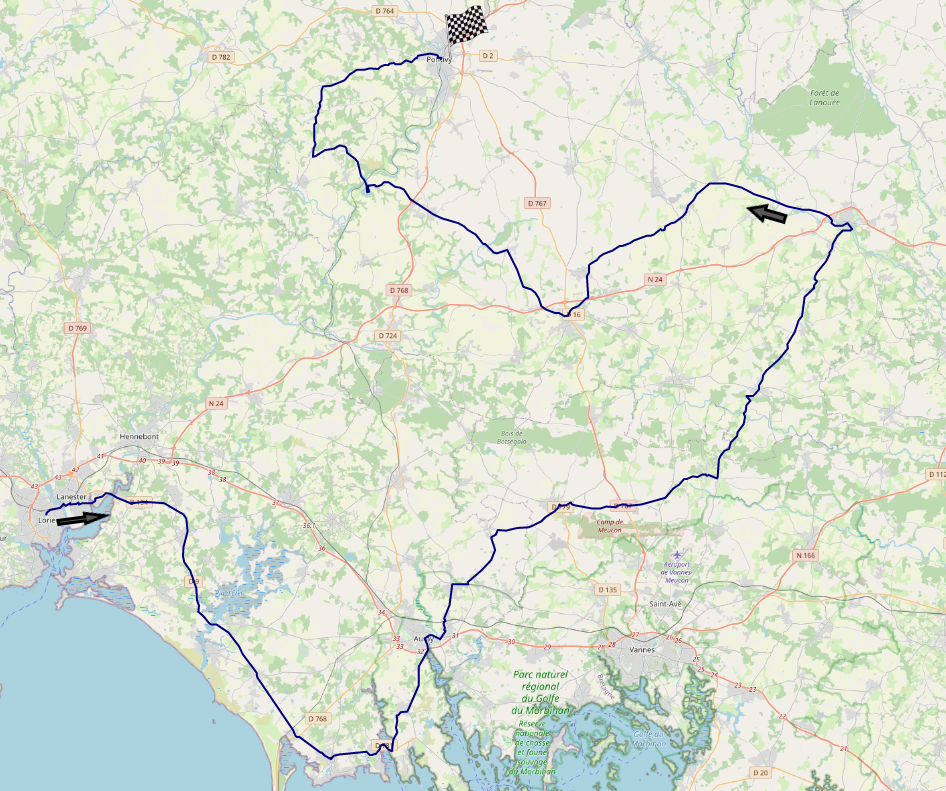
Map of stage 3

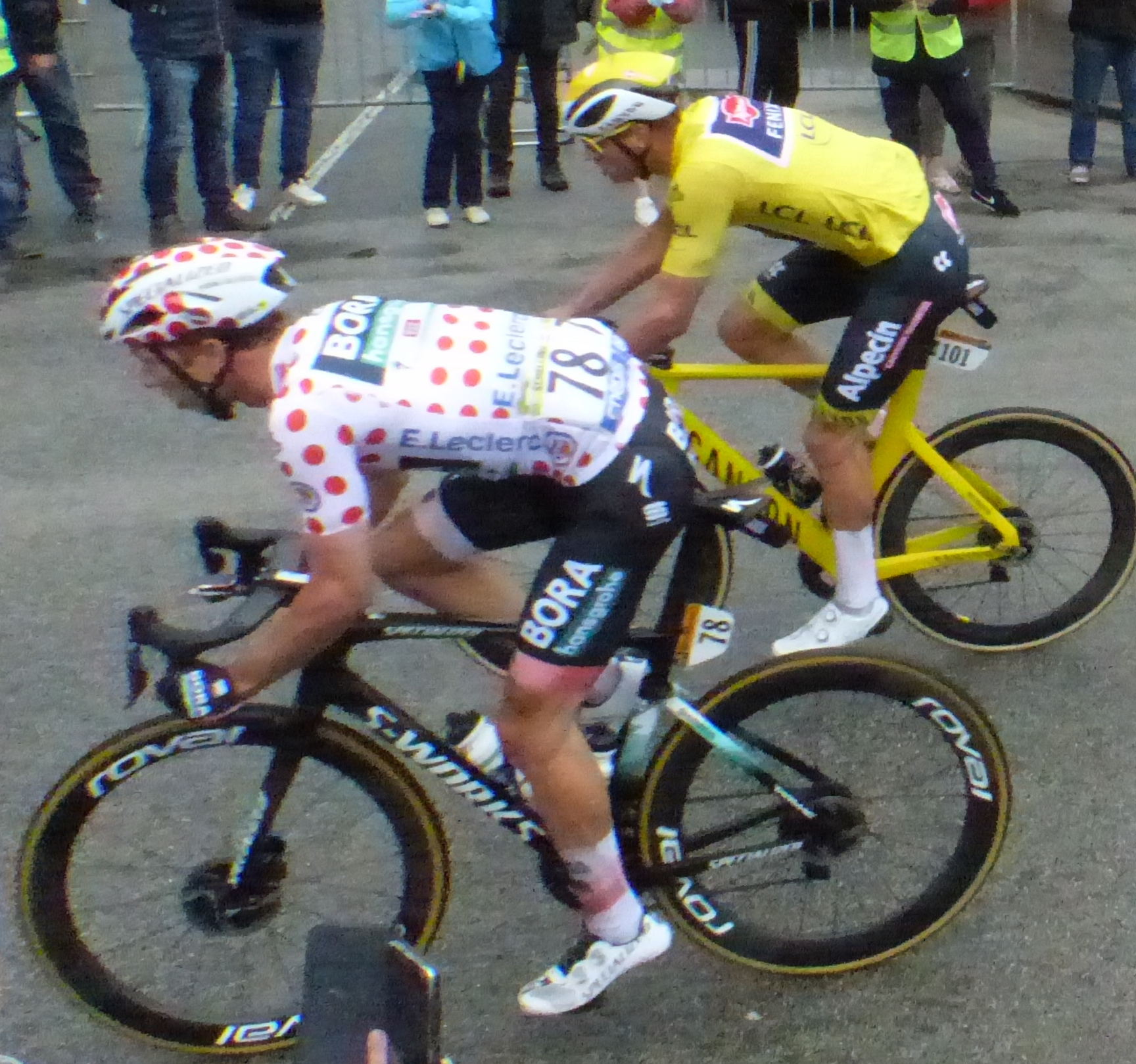
Van der Poel in the yellow jersey and Schelling in the polka dot jersey

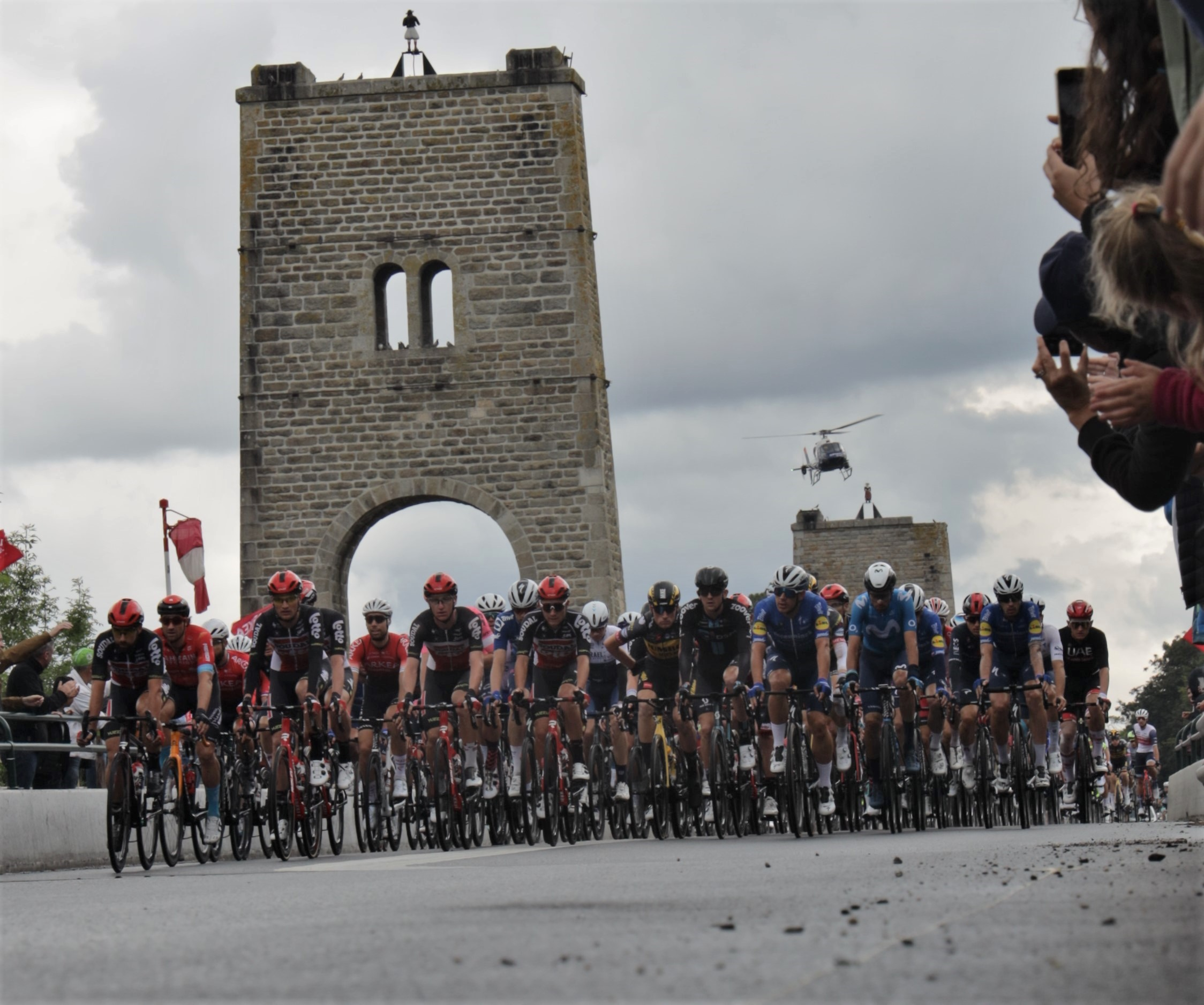
Peloton in Kervignac

The third stage of the Tour offered the first chance for the pure sprinters to battle it out for the win. This time, the riders traveled 182.9 kilometres (113.6 mi) from Lorient to Pontivy. The opening third of the stage was mostly flat before the riders traveled on rolling roads for the rest of the stage. There were two fourth-category climbs on the route, the Côte de Cadoudal and the Côte de Pluméliau, along with an intermediate sprint at La Fourchette in Pleugriffet after 118.3 kilometres (73.5 mi).

As soon as the flag dropped, a group of five riders broke away from the peloton, including Ide Schelling (Bora–Hansgrohe), who had featured in the break during the previous two days and was deputizing in the polka-dot jersey for classification and race leader Mathieu van der Poel (Alpecin–Fenix). The break's advantage reached a maximum of around three minutes before the sprinters' teams started to chase them. After 37 kilometres (23 mi) of racing, a crash in the peloton brought down Geraint Thomas (INEOS Grenadiers) and Robert Gesink (Team Jumbo–Visma), with the latter eventually having to abandon the race. It was soon reported that Thomas suffered from a dislocated shoulder, but he continued in the race and eventually made it back to the peloton with the help of his team. At the first climb of the day, Schelling attacked to gain the solitary mountain point at the top. This allowed him to take the lead once again in the king of the mountains competition. Shortly afterwards, he dropped back to the peloton to make it a quartet up front. At the intermediate sprint, after the four breakaway riders took the maximum points, Caleb Ewan (Lotto–Soudal) once again outsprinted Mark Cavendish (Deceuninck–Quick-Step) in the battle for the points jersey. Afterwards, the peloton gradually reduced the break's advantage as they prepared themselves for the bunch sprint.

Inside the final 10 kilometres (6.2 mi), several crashes took place in the peloton. The first crash took place close to the ten-kilometre mark and involved Miguel Ángel López (Movistar Team) and Valentin Madouas (Groupama–FDJ). Shortly afterwards, Primož Roglič (Team Jumbo–Visma) crashed heavily on the side of the road. He got up but by the time he started riding again, he was already more than a minute down on the peloton, with most of his teammates trying to pace him back. Shortly after the break was caught with around 5 kilometres (3.1 mi) to go, another crash took place, with Jack Haig (Team Bahrain Victorious) among those to fall; Haig was eventually forced to abandon the race. Tadej Pogačar (UAE Team Emirates), David Gaudu (Groupama–FDJ), Rigoberto Urán (EF Education–Nippo), and Thomas were also held up in the crash but they were able to escape unscathed. Inside the flamme rouge, the sprinters prepared themselves for the final sprint. However, Ewan went down following a touch of wheels also taking down Peter Sagan (Bora–Hansgrohe) in the process. While Sagan was able to continue in the race, Ewan needed medical attention and eventually had to abandon due to a fractured collarbone. In the final sprint, Jasper Philipsen (Alpecin–Fenix) led out teammate Tim Merlier for the win, with Philipsen himself holding off Nacer Bouhanni (Arkéa–Samsic) to make it a one-two finish for Alpecin–Fenix. In the aftermath of the crashes, several contenders lost time. A group containing Enric Mas (Movistar Team), Vincenzo Nibali (Trek–Segafredo), Jakob Fuglsang (Astana–Premier Tech), Nairo Quintana (Arkéa–Samsic), and Wilco Kelderman (Bora–Hansgrohe) lost 14 seconds at the line. The group containing Pogačar, Gaudu, Urán, and Thomas lost 26 seconds at the finish. The biggest time loss was suffered by Roglič as he lost almost a minute and a half at the line.

In the GC, Mathieu van der Poel (Alpecin–Fenix) was able to stay in the front group and thus kept the maillot jaune. Julian Alaphilippe (Deceuninck–Quick-Step) also avoided the crashes to retain his second place. Richard Carapaz (INEOS Grenadiers), the only GC contender to not be held up by the crashes, moved up to third at 31 seconds behind.

Stage 3 Result
Rank	Rider	Team	Time
1	Tim Merlier (BEL)	Alpecin–Fenix	4h 01' 28"
2	Jasper Philipsen (BEL)	Alpecin–Fenix	+ 0"
3	Nacer Bouhanni (FRA)	Arkéa–Samsic	+ 0"
4	Davide Ballerini (ITA)	Deceuninck–Quick-Step	+ 0"
5	Sonny Colbrelli (ITA)	Team Bahrain Victorious	+ 0"
6	Julian Alaphilippe (FRA)	Deceuninck–Quick-Step	+ 0"
7	Mathieu van der Poel (NED)	Alpecin–Fenix	+ 0"
8	Cees Bol (NED)	Team DSM	+ 0"
9	Anthony Turgis (FRA)	Team TotalEnergies	+ 0"
10	Max Walscheid (GER)	Team Qhubeka NextHash	+ 0"

General classification after Stage 3
Rank	Rider	Team	Time
1	Mathieu van der Poel (NED)	Alpecin–Fenix	12h 58' 53"
2	Julian Alaphilippe (FRA)	Deceuninck–Quick-Step	+ 8"
3	Richard Carapaz (ECU)	INEOS Grenadiers	+ 31"
4	Wout van Aert (BEL)	Team Jumbo–Visma	+ 31"
5	Wilco Kelderman (NED)	Bora–Hansgrohe	+ 38"
6	Tadej Pogačar (SLO)	UAE Team Emirates	+ 39"
7	Enric Mas (ESP)	Movistar Team	+ 40"
8	Nairo Quintana (COL)	Arkéa–Samsic	+ 40"
9	Pierre Latour (FRA)	Team TotalEnergies	+ 45"
10	Sergio Higuita (COL)	EF Education–Nippo	+ 52"

== Stage 4 ==
29 June 2021 – Redon to Fougères, 150.5 km (93.5 mi)

The intermediate sprint in Vitré

The fourth stage of the Tour took the riders from Redon to Fougères. The route offered another chance for the sprinters to shine as there were no categorised climbs on the course. The only intermediate sprint of the day took place in Vitré with 36 kilometres (22 mi) to go.

As soon as the riders reached kilometre zero, the whole peloton stopped for a full minute as a form of protest in the aftermath of the crashes in the previous day. The riders had felt that the crashes were partly due to the dangerous run-in to Pontivy. After stopping at kilometre zero, the riders also rode slowly for the first 10 kilometres (6.2 mi). As soon as those kilometres passed, Brent Van Moer (Lotto–Soudal) became the first rider to go on the attack, and he was soon joined by Pierre-Luc Périchon (Cofidis). The peloton never gave the lead duo much of an advantage, with the gap maxing out at around three minutes before the sprinters' teams began to chase them down. After the two breakaway riders took the maximum points at the intermediate sprint, Michael Mørkøv (Deceuninck–Quick-Step) successfully led out his teammate Mark Cavendish, who took the maximum remaining points on offer.

With the break's advantage being reduced to around 30 seconds with 15 kilometres (9.3 mi) to go, Périchon launched an attack that was immediately answered by Van Moer. Van Moer countered with an attack of his own, successfully dropping his breakaway companion as the peloton continued to chase behind. Soon after, the pace slowed in the peloton, allowing Van Moer's lead to increase to more than a minute. The lead stabilised until around 7.5 kilometres (4.7 mi) were left on the stage, at which point the pace in the peloton increased. Van Moer's lead rapidly decreased as the sprinters' teams set up their riders for the finish. With 1.5 kilometres (0.93 mi) to go, Van Moer still maintained a 15-second lead, but the peloton was rapidly closing in on him. Van Moer was eventually caught with 200 metres to go as the previous day's winner, Tim Merlier (Alpecin–Fenix), led out his team's other sprinter, Jasper Philipsen. Philipsen opened up the sprint but Cavendish came around him to take his 31st Tour stage win. Nacer Bouhanni (Arkéa–Samsic) finished second while Philipsen held on for third. As a result of his win, Cavendish also took the lead in the points classification. There was no change in the GC, with Mathieu van der Poel (Alpecin–Fenix) holding an eight-second lead over Julian Alaphilippe (Deceuninck–Quick-Step) ahead of the race's first individual time trial.

Stage 4 Result
Rank	Rider	Team	Time
1	Mark Cavendish (GBR)	Deceuninck–Quick-Step	3h 20' 17"
2	Nacer Bouhanni (FRA)	Arkéa–Samsic	+ 0"
3	Jasper Philipsen (BEL)	Alpecin–Fenix	+ 0"
4	Michael Matthews (AUS)	Team BikeExchange	+ 0"
5	Peter Sagan (SVK)	Bora–Hansgrohe	+ 0"
6	Cees Bol (NED)	Team DSM	+ 0"
7	Christophe Laporte (FRA)	Cofidis	+ 0"
8	Mads Pedersen (DEN)	Trek–Segafredo	+ 0"
9	Boy van Poppel (NED)	Intermarché–Wanty–Gobert Matériaux	+ 0"
10	André Greipel (GER)	Israel Start-Up Nation	+ 0"

General classification after Stage 4
Rank	Rider	Team	Time
1	Mathieu van der Poel (NED)	Alpecin–Fenix	16h 19' 10"
2	Julian Alaphilippe (FRA)	Deceuninck–Quick-Step	+ 8"
3	Richard Carapaz (ECU)	INEOS Grenadiers	+ 31"
4	Wout van Aert (BEL)	Team Jumbo–Visma	+ 31"
5	Wilco Kelderman (NED)	Bora–Hansgrohe	+ 38"
6	Tadej Pogačar (SLO)	UAE Team Emirates	+ 39"
7	Enric Mas (ESP)	Movistar Team	+ 40"
8	Nairo Quintana (COL)	Arkéa–Samsic	+ 40"
9	Pierre Latour (FRA)	Team TotalEnergies	+ 45"
10	David Gaudu (FRA)	Groupama–FDJ	+ 52"

== Stage 5 ==
30 June 2021 – Changé to Laval, 27.2 km (16.9 mi) (ITT)

The fifth stage featured the first of two tests against the clock in this year's Tour as the riders faced a 27.2 kilometres (16.9 mi) course between Changé and Laval. The course was not totally flat and featured rolling roads. There were two intermediate time checks, at 8.8 kilometres (5.5 mi) in Saint-Jean-sur-Mayenne, and at 17.2 kilometres (10.7 mi) in Bonchamp-lès-Laval.

Being an ITT, the riders set off in reverse order to their GC positions. As such, Amund Grøndahl Jansen (Team BikeExchange) was the first rider off the start ramp. He was also the first finisher of the stage as he set a time of 37' 04". The first rider to stay in the hot seat for a long time was Mikkel Bjerg (UAE Team Emirates). He set the quickest times at the two intermediate time checks before setting a time of 33' 01". Soon after, rain started falling on the route, affecting several riders. One of the riders affected was Stefan Bissegger (EF Education–Nippo), one of the favorites for the stage win. Having nearly crashed at one point, Bissegger would eventually set a time of 33' 22", 21 seconds slower than Bjerg's time. Bjerg's teammate, Brandon McNulty, was another rider severely affected by the bad weather. McNulty crashed early on in his ride, and he ended up with the slowest time on the day. After a few minutes, the rain stopped falling. The first rider to beat Bjerg's time was Mattia Cattaneo (Deceuninck–Quick-Step). He was six seconds up on Bjerg at the first time check before being two seconds slower at the second time check. He finished with a time of 32' 55", six seconds faster than Bjerg. However, his time was quickly beaten by Stefan Küng (Groupama–FDJ), the reigning European time trial champion. He was the quickest at all time checks before setting a time of 32' 19", 36 seconds quicker than Cattaneo.

Soon, the focus shifted to the GC contenders, starting with Primož Roglič (Team Jumbo–Visma), having lost a minute due to his crash two days earlier. Despite this, Roglič was still able to set a time of 32' 44", good enough for seventh on the stage. His teammate, Jonas Vingegaard, fared even better with a time of 32' 27", the third best time of the day. Another GC rider affected by injuries was Geraint Thomas (INEOS Grenadiers), but unlike Roglič, he struggled on his bike, eventually stopping the clock at 33' 18". Alexey Lutsenko (Astana–Premier Tech) and Rigoberto Urán (EF Education–Nippo) set times of 33' 00" and 33' 08", respectively; their results were good for 10th and 13th on the day. To end the stage, the top ten riders took to the course. Pierre Latour (Team TotalEnergies) was 15th quickest on the day as he set a time of 33' 14". Enric Mas (Movistar Team), Nairo Quintana (Arkéa–Samsic), and David Gaudu (Groupama–FDJ) struggled on the route as they lost two to two and a half minutes on the day. Soon, defending champion Tadej Pogačar (UAE Team Emirates) went off the start ramp. He smashed Küng's time at both time checks before setting a time of 32' 00", beating Küng's time by 19 seconds and becoming the only rider to average 51 kilometres per hour (32 mph) on the day. His time would not be beaten as he took his first stage win in this year's Tour. Wout van Aert (Team Jumbo–Visma), the Belgian time trial champion, was expected to challenge for the win but he only set the fourth-quickest time of 32' 30", 30 seconds behind Pogačar's time. Richard Carapaz (INEOS Grenadiers) and Wilco Kelderman (Bora–Hansgrohe), two riders in the top five in the GC, both lost considerable time and conceded almost two minutes to Pogačar. Julian Alaphilippe (Deceuninck–Quick-Step), the winner of the time trial in Pau two years ago, was only able to manage a time of 33' 11". The last rider to go down the start ramp was Mathieu van der Poel (Alpecin–Fenix), the wearer of the maillot jaune. Although he expected himself to lose the yellow jersey, he was able to set the fifth-quickest time of 32' 31", only 31 seconds behind Pogačar's time and enough to keep the maillot jaune.

In the battle for the GC, Pogačar rose to second, only eight seconds behind van der Poel. Van Aert moved up to third at 30 seconds down while Alaphilippe dropped down to fourth, 48 seconds behind. Lutsenko, Latour, and Urán also moved up the standings but at almost a minute and a half behind van der Poel. Vingegaard moved up to eighth as a result of his third-place finish in the time trial. Three of Pogačar's rivals for the Tour victory, Roglič, Carapaz, and Thomas now lie almost two minutes down on Pogačar.

Stage 5 Result
Rank	Rider	Team	Time
1	Tadej Pogačar (SLO)	UAE Team Emirates	32' 00"
2	Stefan Küng (SUI)	Groupama–FDJ	+ 19"
3	Jonas Vingegaard (DEN)	Team Jumbo–Visma	+ 27"
4	Wout van Aert (BEL)	Team Jumbo–Visma	+ 30"
5	Mathieu van der Poel (NED)	Alpecin–Fenix	+ 31"
6	Kasper Asgreen (DEN)	Deceuninck–Quick-Step	+ 37"
7	Primož Roglič (SLO)	Team Jumbo–Visma	+ 44"
8	Mattia Cattaneo (ITA)	Deceuninck–Quick-Step	+ 55"
9	Richie Porte (AUS)	INEOS Grenadiers	+ 55"
10	Alexey Lutsenko (KAZ)	Astana–Premier Tech	+ 1' 00"

General classification after Stage 5
Rank	Rider	Team	Time
1	Mathieu van der Poel (NED)	Alpecin–Fenix	16h 51' 41"
2	Tadej Pogačar (SLO)	UAE Team Emirates	+ 8"
3	Wout van Aert (BEL)	Team Jumbo–Visma	+ 30"
4	Julian Alaphilippe (FRA)	Deceuninck–Quick-Step	+ 48"
5	Alexey Lutsenko (KAZ)	Astana–Premier Tech	+ 1' 21"
6	Pierre Latour (FRA)	Team TotalEnergies	+ 1' 28"
7	Rigoberto Urán (COL)	EF Education–Nippo	+ 1' 29"
8	Jonas Vingegaard (DEN)	Team Jumbo–Visma	+ 1' 43"
9	Richard Carapaz (ECU)	INEOS Grenadiers	+ 1' 44"
10	Primož Roglič (SLO)	Team Jumbo–Visma	+ 1' 48"

== Stage 6 ==
1 July 2021 – Tours to Châteauroux, 160.6 km (99.8 mi)

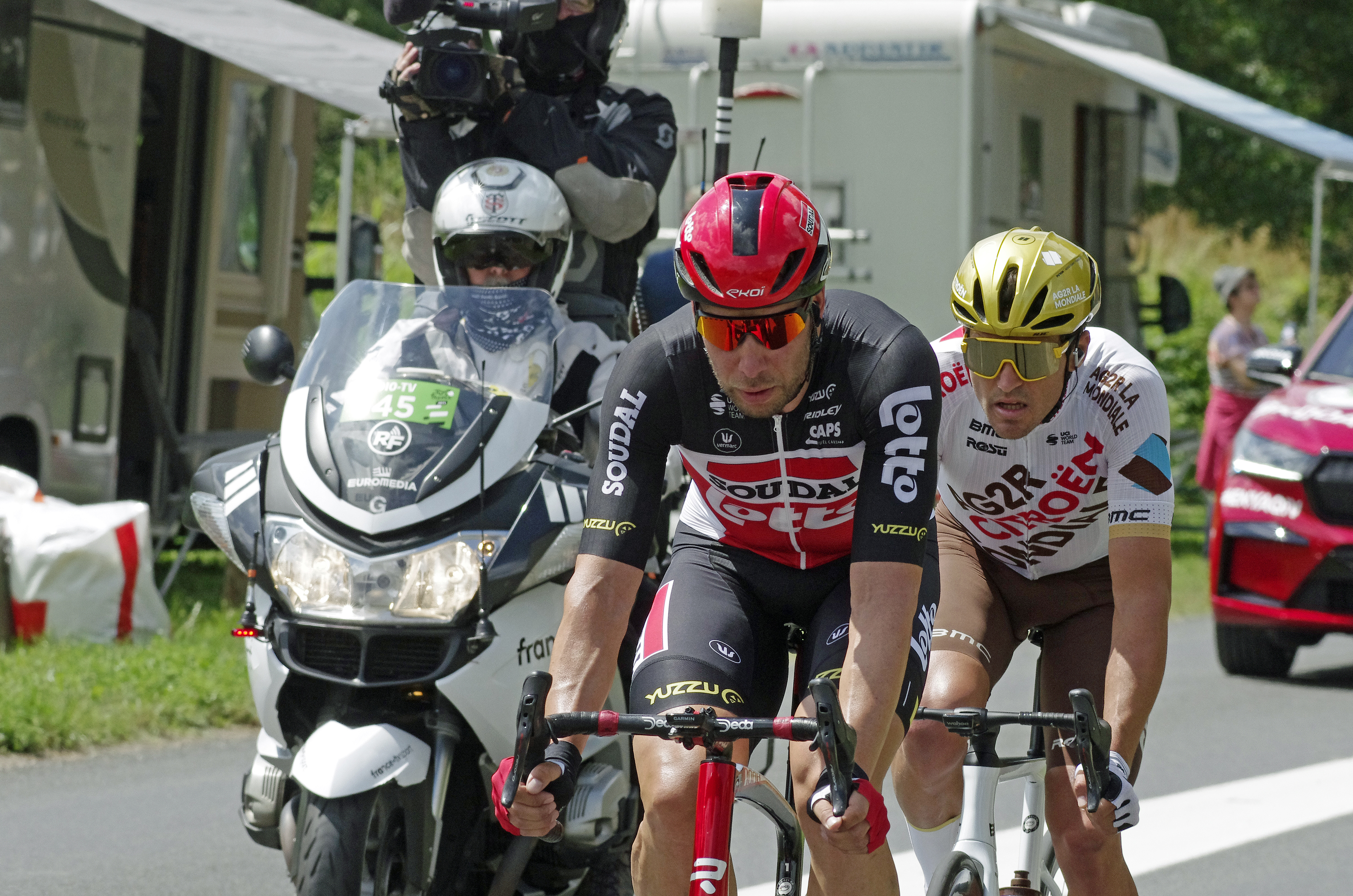
The stage's main breakaway, consisting of Roger Kluge (left) and Greg Van Avermaet, passing through Thésée

The sixth stage of the race featured a flat course from Tours to Châteauroux and offered another chance for the sprinters to battle it out for the stage win. There was a single fourth-category climb, the Côte de Saint-Aignan, on the route while the intermediate sprint took place in Luçay-le-Mâle with 56.3 kilometres (35.0 mi) to go.

A few kilometres from the start of the stage, a high-profile eight-man break, including Thomas De Gendt (Lotto–Soudal), Greg Van Avermaet (AG2R Citroën Team), Kasper Asgreen (Deceuninck–Quick-Step), and Søren Kragh Andersen (Team DSM), broke away from the peloton. The break also featured other riders from sprinters' teams. The best-placed GC rider from the break was Asgreen, sitting in 11th at 1' 49" down on race leader Mathieu van der Poel (Alpecin–Fenix). With most of the sprinters' teams represented in the break, it was up to Groupama–FDJ and Arkéa–Samsic, other sprinters' teams who had no riders in the break, to chase the group. The group led by as much as a minute before the gap began to come down. With 143 kilometres (89 mi) to go, the break split in half before eventually regrouping. However, the presence of Asgreen, resulting in a lack of cooperation, meant the group was eventually caught but not before Van Avermaet soloed off the front. The only rider to bridge up to him was Roger Kluge (Lotto–Soudal). The pair gained an advantage of around two minutes before being chased down. The duo would also take maximum points at the intermediate sprint. In a messy sprint for the remaining points on offer, Sonny Colbrelli (Team Bahrain Victorious) took third ahead of Michael Mørkøv (Deceuninck–Quick-Step).

With 20 kilometres (12 mi) to go, the pair's advantage was down to just 13 seconds before the peloton slightly eased off, allowing the pair to build their advantage once again. With 10 kilometres (6.2 mi) to go, the break still had an advantage of 40 seconds, but the peloton was starting to close in on them. The pair was eventually caught with 2.5 kilometres (1.6 mi) to go as the sprinters' teams prepared themselves for the sprint. With the final 1.6 kilometres (0.99 mi) of the stage being on a straight road all the way to the line, the lead-out trains prepared for the final sprint; chief among those trains were Deceuninck–Quick-Step and Alpecin–Fenix. From the latter team, Stage 3 winner Tim Merlier once again tried to lead out his teammate Jasper Philipsen, with points classification leader Mark Cavendish (Deceuninck–Quick-Step) switching from the wheel of his lead-out man Mørkøv to that of Philipsen. In the last 150 metres, Cavendish came around both Alpecin–Fenix riders to win his 32nd Tour stage win. Philipsen took second while Nacer Bouhanni (Arkéa–Samsic) finished third. With his win, it marked the third time that Cavendish won in Chateauroux; the first was in 2008 when he took his first Tour stage win before winning there again in 2011. He also increased his lead in the points classification to 46 points over Philipsen. Van der Poel finished safely in the peloton to retain the maillot jaune, with the top ten on GC unchanged.

Stage 6 Result
Rank	Rider	Team	Time
1	Mark Cavendish (GBR)	Deceuninck–Quick-Step	3h 17' 36"
2	Jasper Philipsen (BEL)	Alpecin–Fenix	+ 0"
3	Nacer Bouhanni (FRA)	Arkéa–Samsic	+ 0"
4	Arnaud Démare (FRA)	Groupama–FDJ	+ 0"
5	Peter Sagan (SVK)	Bora–Hansgrohe	+ 0"
6	Cees Bol (NED)	Team DSM	+ 0"
7	Tim Merlier (BEL)	Alpecin–Fenix	+ 0"
8	Wout van Aert (BEL)	Team Jumbo–Visma	+ 0"
9	Michael Matthews (AUS)	Team BikeExchange	+ 0"
10	Mads Pedersen (DEN)	Trek–Segafredo	+ 0"

General classification after Stage 6
Rank	Rider	Team	Time
1	Mathieu van der Poel (NED)	Alpecin–Fenix	20h 09' 17"
2	Tadej Pogačar (SLO)	UAE Team Emirates	+ 8"
3	Wout van Aert (BEL)	Team Jumbo–Visma	+ 30"
4	Julian Alaphilippe (FRA)	Deceuninck–Quick-Step	+ 48"
5	Alexey Lutsenko (KAZ)	Astana–Premier Tech	+ 1' 21"
6	Pierre Latour (FRA)	Team TotalEnergies	+ 1' 28"
7	Rigoberto Urán (COL)	EF Education–Nippo	+ 1' 29"
8	Jonas Vingegaard (DEN)	Team Jumbo–Visma	+ 1' 43"
9	Richard Carapaz (ECU)	INEOS Grenadiers	+ 1' 44"
10	Primož Roglič (SLO)	Team Jumbo–Visma	+ 1' 48"

== Stage 7 ==
2 July 2021 – Vierzon to Le Creusot, 249.1 km (154.8 mi)

Stage 7

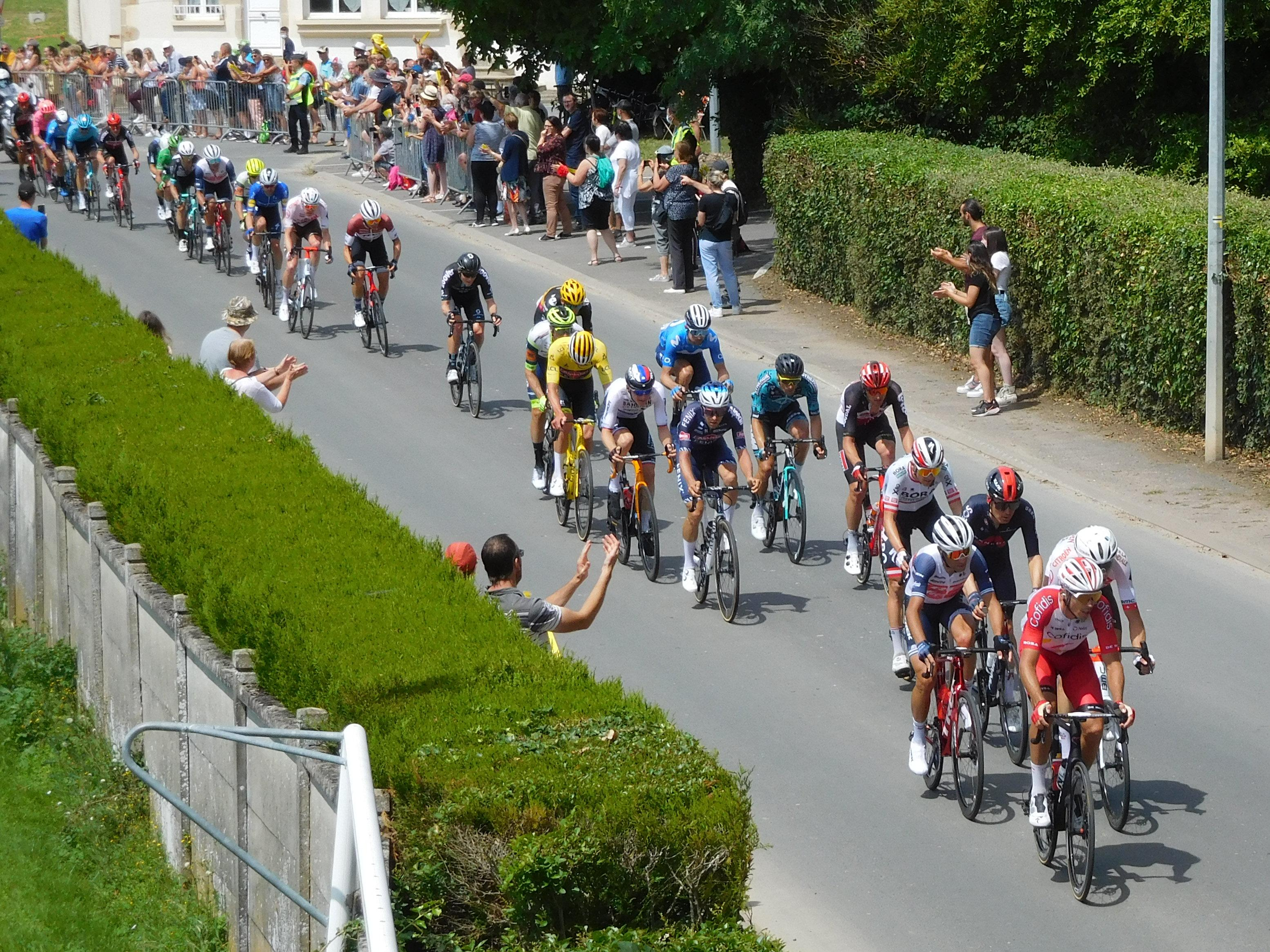
Stage 7's main breakaway, including race leader Mathieu van der Poel (yellow jersey, center) and points classification leader Mark Cavendish (green jersey, far left), passing through Baugy

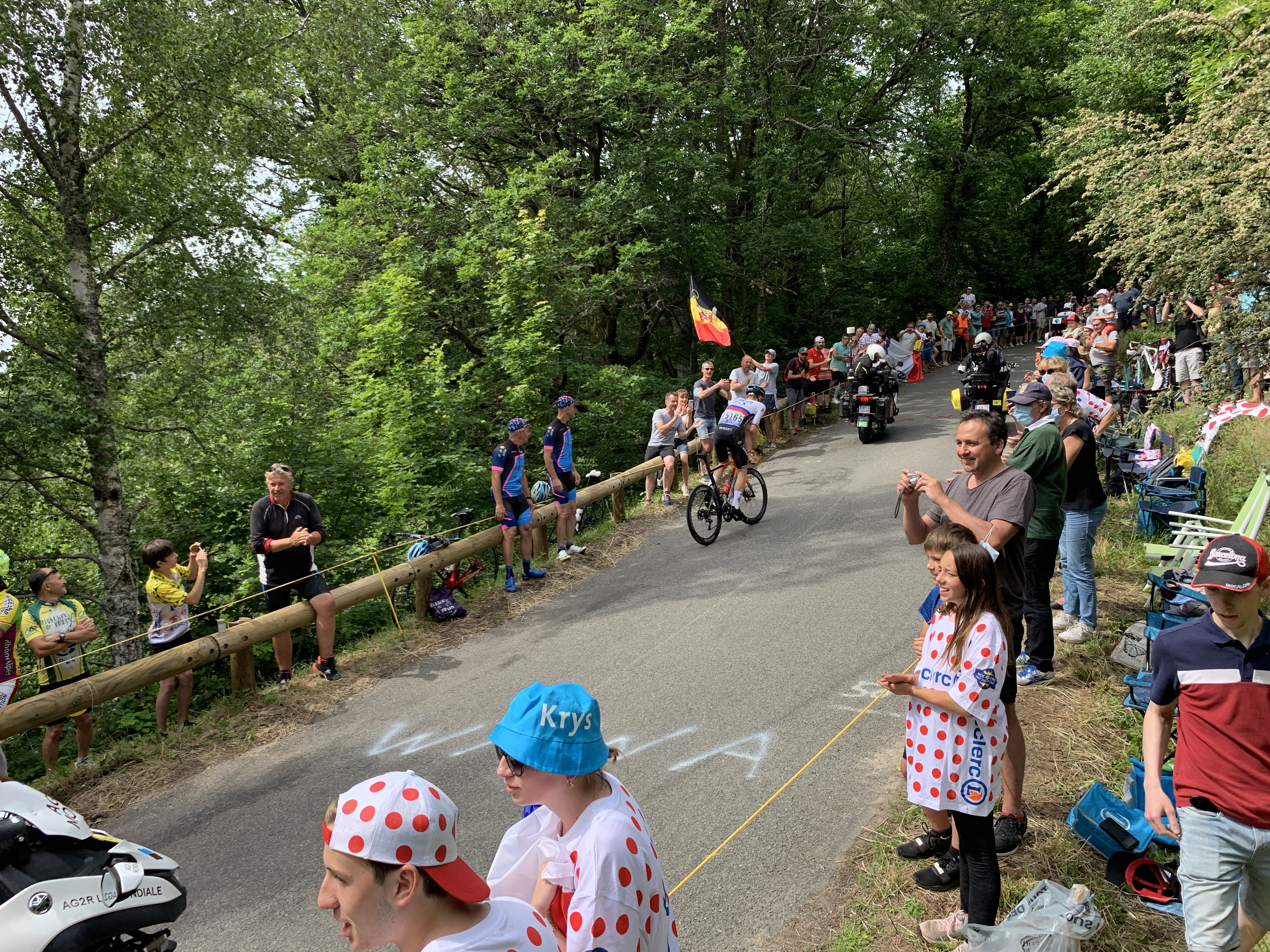
Eventual stage winner Matej Mohorič accelerating on the Signal d'Uchon

The seventh stage featured a hilly course from Vierzon to Le Creusot. With a distance of 249.1 kilometres (154.8 mi), it was the longest stage of this year's Tour and the race's longest stage in the past 20 years. The first 150 kilometres (93 mi) of the stage was mostly flat, with the intermediate sprint taking place in Saint-Benin-d'Azy after 115.4 kilometres (71.7 mi). Afterwards, the riders tackled five categorized climbs in the final 99.1 kilometres (61.6 mi) of the stage. The most crucial climb among these was the second-category climb of Signal d'Uchon, which topped with 18.1 kilometres (11.2 mi) left on the stage. The climb was 5.7 kilometres (3.5 mi) long with an average gradient of 5.7 percent while the last 1.6 kilometres (0.99 mi) of the climb averaged 11.2 percent. The top of the climb also offered eight, five, and two bonus seconds to the first three riders. The finish of the stage was on a slightly uphill drag.

Several attacks marked the start of the day until a dangerous 29-man break went away with around 200 kilometres (120 mi) to go. The break included riders such as Mathieu van der Poel (Alpecin–Fenix), the maillot jaune, Wout van Aert (Team Jumbo–Visma), Vincenzo Nibali (Trek–Segafredo), Philippe Gilbert (Lotto–Soudal), Mark Cavendish (Deceuninck–Quick-Step), the leader of the points classification, Kasper Asgreen (Deceuninck–Quick-Step) and Simon Yates (Team BikeExchange). UAE Team Emirates tried to chase the break quickly but their advantage gradually went up. The team ended up chasing for much of the day. The break's lead reached a maximum of around seven minutes before the gap stabilized. At the intermediate sprint, Cavendish took the maximum points, increasing his lead in the points classification to 66 over Jasper Philipsen (Alpecin–Fenix). With around 87.5 kilometres (54.4 mi) to go, Matej Mohorič (Team Bahrain Victorious) attacked from the break together with Brent Van Moer (Lotto–Soudal). Mohorič proceeded to take maximum points over the first two climbs as the pair increased their advantage to a minute over the rest of the break. From behind, Victor Campenaerts (Team Qhubeka NextHash) and Jasper Stuyven (Trek–Segafredo) attacked, eventually bridging up to the pair up front. Several riders also attempted to attack from the break, but no attack stuck.

On the third climb of the day, Campenaerts ended up getting dropped from the leading group while several attacks ended up splitting the second group. Mohorič picked up the maximum points at the top, putting him into a tie with Ide Schelling (Bora–Hansgrohe) for the lead in the king of the mountains competition. The leading trio had a lead of more than a minute and a half over the second group as they reached the foot of the second-category Signal d'Uchon. On the climb's steep section, Mohorič attacked for the mountains classification points at the summit, but after seeing the gap he created, he pushed on and dropped both of his companions in the leading group. He eventually soloed to the top, with Stuyven cresting in second after dropping Van Moer. Patrick Konrad (Bora–Hansgrohe) also attacked from the second group as he tried to bridge to the front, with Asgreen, Magnus Cort (EF Education–Nippo), and Franck Bonnamour (B&B Hotels p/b KTM) chasing closely behind. With around 8 kilometres (5.0 mi) to go, van Aert attacked together with van der Poel, with the duo eventually bridging to Konrad's group in the final kilometre. Up front, Mohorič gradually increased his advantage before soloing to the line. Stuyven crossed the line in second at almost a minute and a half behind Mohorič while Cort won the sprint for third. With the win, Mohorič completed his set of taking a stage win at all three Grand Tours. He also took the lead in the king of the mountains competition and won the day's combativity award.

In the GC group, UAE Team Emirates continued to control the peloton, with the team getting some occasional help from Team TotalEnergies. At one point in the stage, Jonas Vingegaard (Team Jumbo–Visma) crashed but he would make his way back to the peloton. The group remained relatively quiet until they reached the climb of Signal d'Uchon. The first rider to attack was Pierre Latour (Team TotalEnergies). As the pace in the peloton increased, Primož Roglič (Team Jumbo–Visma) was dropped from the peloton. Roglič continued to lose time until the end of the stage, eventually conceding more than three minutes to the peloton and effectively ending his chances for Tour victory. Near the top of Signal d'Uchon, Geraint Thomas (INEOS Grenadiers) was briefly dropped but managed to make his way back to the peloton. At around the same point, his teammate, Richard Carapaz attacked, with no response from Tadej Pogačar (UAE Team Emirates). He led by as much as 40 seconds at one point and also found help from his teammate, Dylan van Baarle, who was dropped from the break. However, Movistar Team would chase down his move, with the peloton catching him right at the finish.

In the GC, van der Poel's lead increased to 30 seconds, as van Aert moved up to second. Asgreen is now third at 1' 49" down while Mohorič moved up to fourth at 3' 01" behind. Pogačar dropped down to fifth, almost four minutes down on van der Poel while Nibali moved up to sixth at more than four minutes behind. As a result of his time loss, Roglič dropped to 33rd on GC, more than nine minutes behind van der Poel and almost five and a half minutes behind Pogačar.

Stage 7 Result
Rank	Rider	Team	Time
1	Matej Mohorič (SLO)	Team Bahrain Victorious	5h 28' 20"
2	Jasper Stuyven (BEL)	Trek–Segafredo	+ 1' 20"
3	Magnus Cort (DEN)	EF Education–Nippo	+ 1' 40"
4	Mathieu van der Poel (NED)	Alpecin–Fenix	+ 1' 40"
5	Kasper Asgreen (DEN)	Deceuninck–Quick-Step	+ 1' 40"
6	Franck Bonnamour (FRA)	B&B Hotels p/b KTM	+ 1' 40"
7	Patrick Konrad (AUT)	Bora–Hansgrohe	+ 1' 40"
8	Wout van Aert (BEL)	Team Jumbo–Visma	+ 1' 40"
9	Brent Van Moer (BEL)	Lotto–Soudal	+ 1' 44"
10	Dorian Godon (FRA)	AG2R Citroën Team	+ 2' 45"

General classification after Stage 7
Rank	Rider	Team	Time
1	Mathieu van der Poel (NED)	Alpecin–Fenix	25h 39' 17"
2	Wout van Aert (BEL)	Team Jumbo–Visma	+ 30"
3	Kasper Asgreen (DEN)	Deceuninck–Quick-Step	+ 1' 49"
4	Matej Mohorič (SLO)	Team Bahrain Victorious	+ 3' 01"
5	Tadej Pogačar (SLO)	UAE Team Emirates	+ 3' 43"
6	Vincenzo Nibali (ITA)	Trek–Segafredo	+ 4' 12"
7	Julian Alaphilippe (FRA)	Deceuninck–Quick-Step	+ 4' 23"
8	Alexey Lutsenko (KAZ)	Astana–Premier Tech	+ 4' 56"
9	Pierre Latour (FRA)	Team TotalEnergies	+ 5' 03"
10	Rigoberto Urán (COL)	EF Education–Nippo	+ 5' 04"

== Stage 8 ==
3 July 2021 – Oyonnax to Le Grand-Bornand, 150.8 km (93.7 mi)

Stage 8

Start of Stage 8

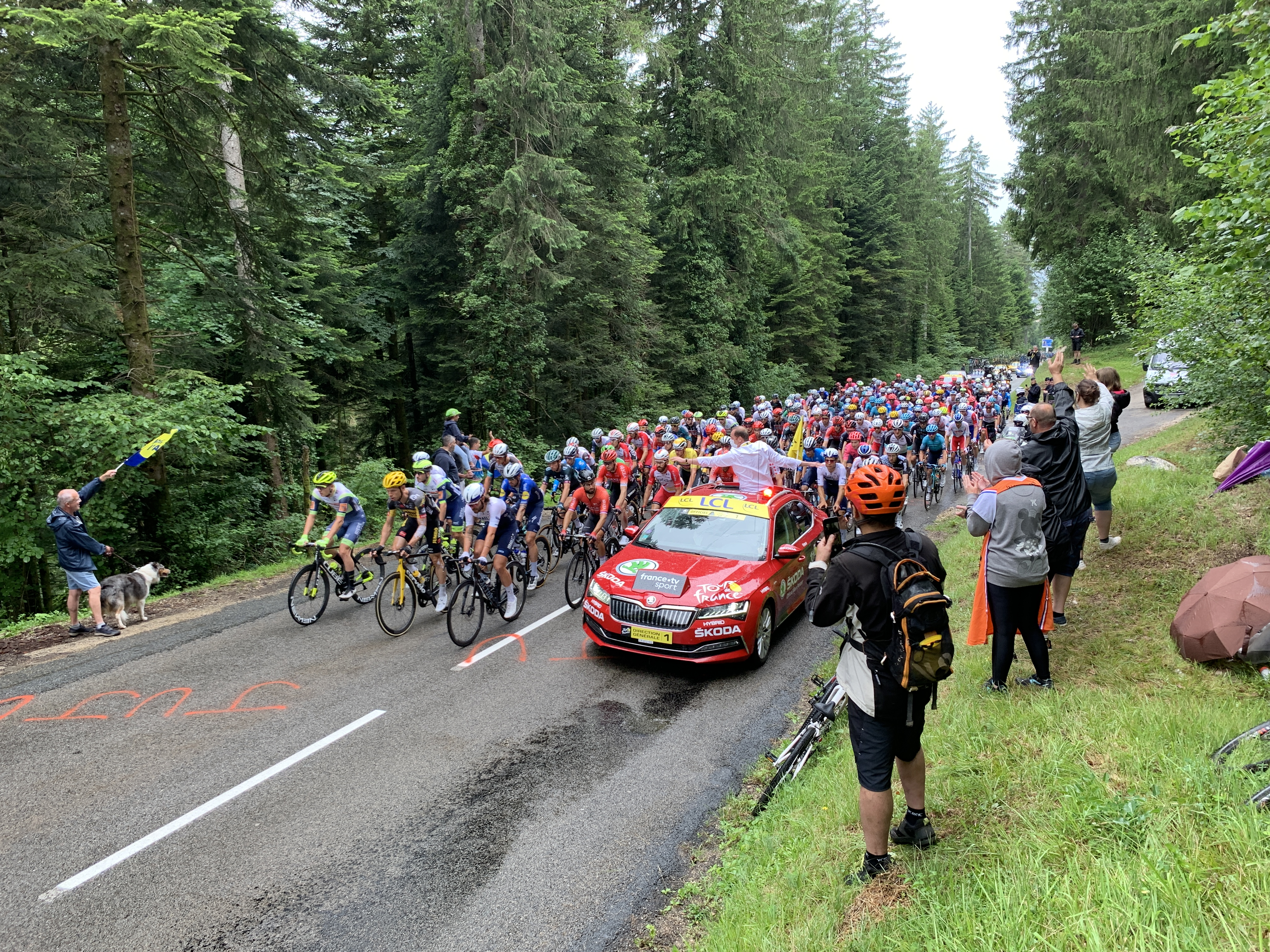
The peloton riding through the neutral section to the official stage start in Oyonnax

The race headed to the Alps for the first time in this year's Tour on stage 8, with the riders travelling from Oyonnax to Le Grand-Bornard. From the get-go, the riders tackled 5 kilometres (3.1 mi) of an uncategorized climb, providing a launchpad for the break to get away. The intermediate sprint took place in Frangy after 44.8 kilometres (27.8 mi) before the riders headed into the mountains. After two climbs, a third- and fourth-category respectively, the riders took on three first-category climbs. The first of these was the Côte de Mont-Saxonnex, a 5.7 kilometres (3.5 mi) climb with an average gradient of 8.3 percent. A short descent led to the foot of the Col de Romme, 8.8 kilometres (5.5 mi) long with an average gradient of 8.9 percent. Another short descent led to the final climb of the day, the Col de la Colombière, 7.5 kilometres (4.7 mi) long with an average gradient of 8.5 percent. The riders topped the Colombière with 14.7 kilometres (9.1 mi) to go. Eight, five, and two bonus seconds, respectively, were awarded to the first three riders across the top. The riders then reached the finish in Le Grand-Bornard after a descent and a short flat section.

With an uncategorized climb to start the day, several riders attempted to attack before Wout Poels (Team Bahrain Victorious) soloed off the front. A chasing group immediately formed while the peloton rode closely behind. Near the top of the climb, an injured Geraint Thomas (INEOS Grenadiers) was unable to maintain the pace. On the descent, the peloton split, with Pierre Latour (Team TotalEnergies), sitting in the top ten on GC, among the riders caught out. Later, another injured pre-race favorite, Primož Roglič (Team Jumbo–Visma) was dropped on the flat section. These three GC contenders would each finish over 30 minutes down on the stage, with their GC aspirations all but dashed. At this point, no breakaway had stuck. At the intermediate sprint, Sonny Colbrelli (Team Bahrain Victorious) took maximum points ahead of Michael Matthews (Team BikeExchange). At one point, Tadej Pogačar (UAE Team Emirates) found himself in the breakaway but soon rejoined the main peloton. On the first first-category climb of the day, Poels attacked solo once again. Eventually, with 77 kilometres (48 mi) to go, the peloton settled down while a chase group formed, which eventually caught Poels. They built their advantage over the UAE Team Emirates-led peloton as they neared the top of Côte de Mont-Saxonnex. Poels was first over the top of the first-category climb, putting him in the lead of the king of the mountains competition.

Just before the second category-one climb of Col de Romme, the Team DSM duo of Søren Kragh Andersen and Tiesj Benoot attacked from the break. In the peloton, a crash involving Jonas Vingegaard (Team Jumbo–Visma) and Stefan de Bod (Astana–Premier Tech) took place, but both riders were able to get back to the peloton. As the break reached the Col de Romme, Michael Woods (Israel Start-Up Nation) attacked, eventually passing Kragh Andersen, and soloing off the front. The break fragmented as a chase group formed in pursuit of Woods. Woods gained an advantage of more than a minute on the chasers as he took maximum mountain points at the top while Poels took second in the chasing group. Soon, the break reached the final first-category climb of the day, the Col de la Colombière. At this point, Woods started to fade and his advantage gradually came down. 3 kilometres (1.9 mi) from the top, Dylan Teuns (Team Bahrain Victorious) caught Woods while the chasing group began to fragment. A kilometre from the top, Teuns dropped Woods as he soloed to the top. He kept his advantage all the way to the line, soloing to the stage win.

In the main peloton, UAE Team Emirates controlled the group of contenders for much of the day. As they reached the Col de Romme, Davide Formolo increased the pace in the group and dropped the maillot jaune, Mathieu van der Poel (Alpecin–Fenix), while Wout van Aert (Team Jumbo–Visma) and Julian Alaphilippe (Deceuninck–Quick-Step) also began to struggle. With 4 kilometres (2.5 mi) to the top of the Romme, Pogačar launched an attack and only Richard Carapaz (INEOS Grenadiers) was able to stay with him. After Carapaz refused to work, Pogačar accelerated once again, dropping Carapaz for good. Pogačar gradually increased his advantage over Carapaz while also passing the remnants of the breakaway. At the top of the Colombière, Pogačar had increased his advantage to more than three minutes over Carapaz while also getting to within 20 seconds of catching Teuns. On the descent to the finish, Pogačar avoided taking risks, with Woods and Ion Izagirre (Astana–Premier Tech) catching him. Izagirre finished second, more than 40 seconds behind Teuns with Woods taking third. Pogačar finished fourth on the day at almost 50 seconds behind Teuns. On the descent from the Colombière, Carapaz was caught by the group of the other contenders, eventually finishing more than four minutes behind and conceding more than three minutes to Pogačar. Van Aert tried to limit his losses but he had lost more than five minutes by the end.

In the GC, Pogačar took the maillot jaune with a lead of almost two minutes on van Aert. Alexey Lutsenko (Astana–Premier Tech) moved up to third, more than four and a half minutes behind. From third to ninth in the GC, the riders were separated by less than a minute and a half from each other. Pello Bilbao (Team Bahrain Victorious) climbed into tenth, almost seven minutes behind Pogačar.

Stage 8 Result
Rank	Rider	Team	Time
1	Dylan Teuns (BEL)	Team Bahrain Victorious	3h 54' 41"
2	Ion Izagirre (ESP)	Astana–Premier Tech	+ 44"
3	Michael Woods (CAN)	Israel Start-Up Nation	+ 47"
4	Tadej Pogačar (SLO)	UAE Team Emirates	+ 49"
5	Wout Poels (NED)	Team Bahrain Victorious	+ 2' 33"
6	Simon Yates (GBR)	Team BikeExchange	+ 2' 43"
7	Aurélien Paret-Peintre (FRA)	AG2R Citroën Team	+ 3' 03"
8	Guillaume Martin (FRA)	Cofidis	+ 3' 03"
9	Mattia Cattaneo (ITA)	Deceuninck–Quick-Step	+ 4' 07"
10	Jonas Vingegaard (DEN)	Team Jumbo–Visma	+ 4' 09"

General classification after Stage 8
Rank	Rider	Team	Time
1	Tadej Pogačar (SLO)	UAE Team Emirates	29h 38' 25"
2	Wout van Aert (BEL)	Team Jumbo–Visma	+ 1' 48"
3	Alexey Lutsenko (KAZ)	Astana–Premier Tech	+ 4' 38"
4	Rigoberto Urán (COL)	EF Education–Nippo	+ 4' 46"
5	Jonas Vingegaard (DEN)	Team Jumbo–Visma	+ 5' 00"
6	Richard Carapaz (ECU)	INEOS Grenadiers	+ 5' 01"
7	Wilco Kelderman (NED)	Bora–Hansgrohe	+ 5' 13"
8	Enric Mas (ESP)	Movistar Team	+ 5' 15"
9	David Gaudu (FRA)	Groupama–FDJ	+ 5' 52"
10	Pello Bilbao (ESP)	Team Bahrain Victorious	+ 6' 41"

== Stage 9 ==
4 July 2021 – Cluses to Tignes, 144.9 km (90.0 mi)

The second day in the Alps took the riders from Cluses to the race's first mountaintop finish at Tignes. Tignes was supposed to be visited in 2019 as the finish of Stage 19, but the stage was cut short due to avalanche and landslides near Val-d'Isère on the ascent to Tignes. The first 19 kilometres (12 mi) of the stage were flat before the riders reached the second-category climb of Côte de Domancy. The intermediate sprint took place in Praz-sur-Arly after 32.7 kilometres (20.3 mi), a few kilometres before the riders climbed the first-category Col des Saisies. Following a long descent, the riders tackled the first hors catégorie climb of the race, the Col du Pré, at 12.6 kilometres (7.8 mi) long with an average gradient of 7.7 percent. Immediately after cresting the top and a short descent, the riders reached the second-category climb of Cormet de Roselend. After another long descent and a short flat section, the riders took on the final climb of the day, the first-category Monteé de Tignes, at 21 kilometres (13 mi) long with an average gradient of 5.6 percent. The riders crested the top with 2 kilometres (1.2 mi) to go before a short flat section to the finish line.

Before the start of the stage, Primož Roglič (Team Jumbo–Visma) abandoned the race due to his injuries while Mathieu van der Poel (Alpecin–Fenix) also abandoned as he prepared for the Olympics. At the start of the stage, Harry Sweeny (Lotto–Soudal) and Davide Ballerini (Deceuninck–Quick-Step) kicked off the attacks in the first few kilometres. The pair built a lead of around 40 seconds before being caught at the top of Côte de Domancy, where Pierre Latour (Team TotalEnergies) took maximum points. Several riders would attempt to attack again; chief among them were Sonny Colbrelli (Team Bahrain Victorious) and Michael Matthews (Team BikeExchange) as they attempted to take the points at the intermediate sprint. Soon, a 41-man group went away before the race reached the intermediate sprint. At the sprint itself, Colbrelli outsprinted Matthews, with the latter moving to within 38 points of Mark Cavendish's (Deceuninck–Quick-Step) lead in the points classification. On the Col des Saisies, the break split as several riders attacked. Mountains classification leader Wout Poels (Team Bahrain Victorious) soon attacked off the front as he attempted to extend his lead. Nairo Quintana (Arkéa–Samsic), Ben O'Connor (AG2R Citroën Team), Sergio Higuita (EF Education–Nippo), and Michael Woods (Israel Start-Up Nation) formed a chase group behind Poels, with Quintana bridging up to Poels near the top. Poels eventually took maximum points ahead of Quintana, with the latter accelerating on the descent while the peloton crested the top at six minutes behind. As the break reached the foot of Col du Pré, Quintana was joined by Woods, Higuita, O'Connor, and Lucas Hamilton (Team BikeExchange), while Poels was briefly distanced before eventually rejoining up front.

Near the top of Col du Pré, Poels was once again dropped from the lead group with Hamilton also getting dropped soon afterwards. 2 kilometres (1.2 mi) from the top, Quintana accelerated off the front, with Woods the only other rider to follow him. However, Woods was unable to follow his pace, eventually dropping to a chase group with Higuita and O'Connor. Quintana took maximum points at the top of the Pré to take the virtual lead in the king of the mountains classification while Higuita took second. Higuita soon reached Quintana up front, with O'Connor rejoining them shortly afterwards. Quintana took maximum points at the top of Cormet de Roselend to extend his lead in the mountains classification. On the descent, Higuita briefly took off the front and distancing both Quintana and O'Connor, but both riders would eventually make their way back to Higuita at the foot of Monteé de Tignes. O'Connor proceeded to drop both Higuita and Quintana, eventually soloing to the stage win by more than five minutes. Mattia Cattaneo (Deceuninck–Quick-Step) finished second on the day after Higuita and Quintana struggled for the rest of the stage. Colbrelli ended up finishing third.

In the GC group, UAE Team Emirates controlled for much of the day. At the climb of Col du Pré, Wout van Aert (Team Jumbo–Visma), second place in the GC, was dropped. At one point, the peloton was more than nine minutes behind O'Connor, who started the day 8' 13" behind race leader, Tadej Pogačar (UAE Team Emirates), and thus O'Connor temporarily became the virtual race leader. At the bottom of Monteé de Tignes, there were still three UAE Team Emirates riders surrounding Pogačar. Halfway through the climb, INEOS Grenadiers started to pace in the peloton as they set up their leader, Richard Carapaz. With around 2 kilometres (1.2 mi) to the top of the climb, Carapaz attacked, with Pogačar immediately responding. Shortly afterwards, Pogačar accelerated himself, dropping all his rivals. Pogačar finished sixth on the stage, six minutes behind O'Connor and 32 seconds ahead of a group containing Carapaz, Jonas Vingegaard (Team Jumbo–Visma), Enric Mas (Movistar Team), and Rigoberto Urán (EF Education–Nippo). Wilco Kelderman (Bora–Hansgrohe) lost an additional 13 seconds to the Carapaz group while David Gaudu (Groupama–FDJ) and Alexey Lutsenko (Astana–Premier Tech) each lost more than a minute and a half to Pogačar. Additionally, seven riders missed the time cut, including sprinters Arnaud Démare (Groupama–FDJ) and Bryan Coquard (B&B Hotels p/b KTM), and as such they were eliminated from the race. Nic Dlamini (Team Qhubeka NextHash), the first Black South African to ride the Tour de France, was also among those to miss the time cut; after crashing hard early on in the stage, Dlamini fought through his injuries and eventually finished around 85 minutes behind O'Connor.

In the general classification, Pogačar kept the maillot jaune and extended his lead, now at a margin of two minutes over O'Connor, who moved up to second by virtue of his time gains. Urán moved up to third at more than five minutes behind Pogačar, while Vingegaard and Carapaz rounded out the top five. Mas, Kelderman, Lutsenko, and Gaudu shipped even more time but remained in the top ten. Guillaume Martin (Cofidis), another rider who benefited from being the break, moved up to ninth, at more than seven minutes in arrears.

Stage 9 Result
Rank	Rider	Team	Time
1	Ben O'Connor (AUS)	AG2R Citroën Team	4h 26' 43"
2	Mattia Cattaneo (ITA)	Deceuninck–Quick-Step	+ 5' 07"
3	Sonny Colbrelli (ITA)	Team Bahrain Victorious	+ 5' 34"
4	Guillaume Martin (FRA)	Cofidis	+ 5' 36"
5	Franck Bonnamour (FRA)	B&B Hotels p/b KTM	+ 6' 02"
6	Tadej Pogačar (SLO)	UAE Team Emirates	+ 6' 02"
7	Richard Carapaz (ECU)	INEOS Grenadiers	+ 6' 34"
8	Jonas Vingegaard (DEN)	Team Jumbo–Visma	+ 6' 34"
9	Enric Mas (ESP)	Movistar Team	+ 6' 34"
10	Rigoberto Urán (COL)	EF Education–Nippo	+ 6' 34"

General classification after Stage 9
Rank	Rider	Team	Time
1	Tadej Pogačar (SLO)	UAE Team Emirates	34h 11' 10"
2	Ben O'Connor (AUS)	AG2R Citroën Team	+ 2' 01"
3	Rigoberto Urán (COL)	EF Education–Nippo	+ 5' 18"
4	Jonas Vingegaard (DEN)	Team Jumbo–Visma	+ 5' 32"
5	Richard Carapaz (ECU)	INEOS Grenadiers	+ 5' 33"
6	Enric Mas (ESP)	Movistar Team	+ 5' 47"
7	Wilco Kelderman (NED)	Bora–Hansgrohe	+ 5' 58"
8	Alexey Lutsenko (KAZ)	Astana–Premier Tech	+ 6' 12"
9	Guillaume Martin (FRA)	Cofidis	+ 7' 02"
10	David Gaudu (FRA)	Groupama–FDJ	+ 7' 22"

== Rest day 1 ==
5 July 2021 – Tignes

== Stage 10 ==
6 July 2021 – Albertville to Valence, 190.7 km (118.5 mi)

Stage 10

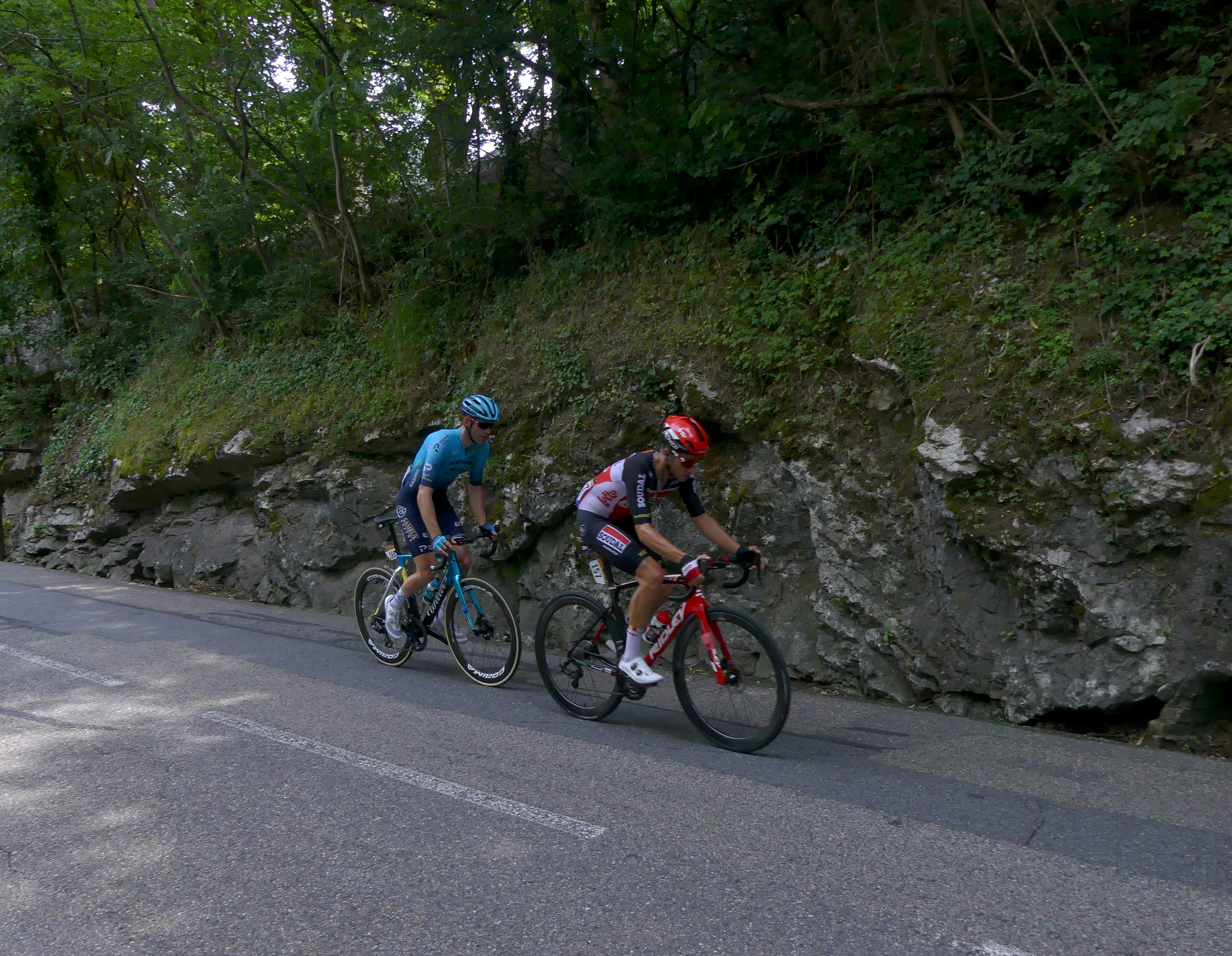
Stage 10's main breakaway, consisting of Hugo Houle (left) and Tosh Van der Sande, passing through Chambéry

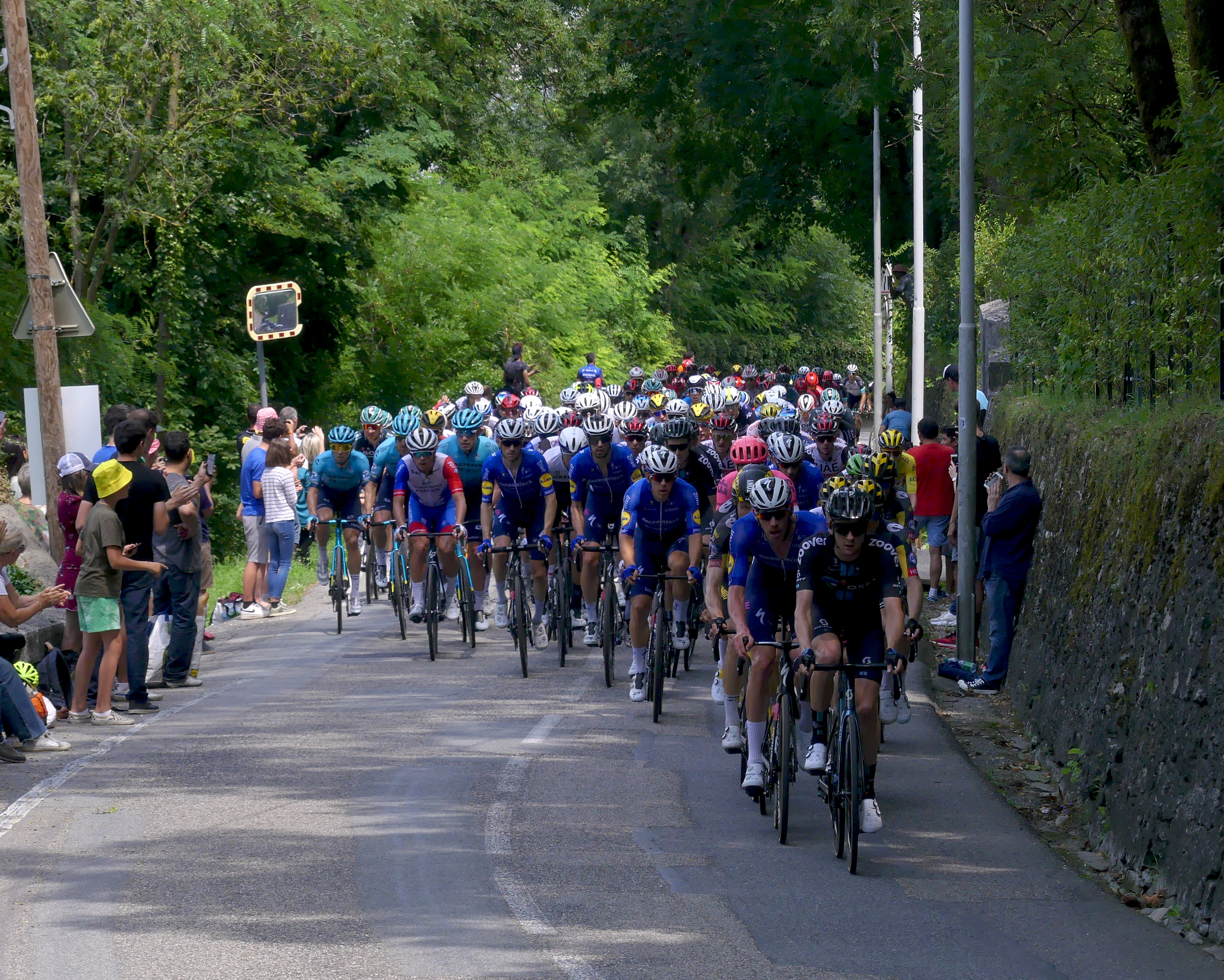
The peloton riding through Chambéry

On the first stage after the first rest day, riders travelled from Albertville to Valence on a mostly flat course. There was an early fourth-category climb, the Col de Couz, at 7.4 kilometres (4.6 mi) long and an average gradient of just under 3 percent. The intermediate sprint took place at the top of an uncategorized climb to La Placette, 108.4 kilometres (67.4 mi) from the finish. With around 41 kilometres (25 mi) left, there was another uncategorized 5.6-kilometre (3.5 mi) long climb up to Beauregard-Baret that averaged just under 4 percent, which provided an opportunity to put the pure sprinters under difficulty. The course after the descent was flat all the way to the line, with a threat of crosswinds on the way to the finish.

As soon as the flag dropped, Hugo Houle (Astana–Premier Tech) and Tosh Van der Sande (Lotto–Soudal) established the day's main breakaway. The pair gained a maximum advantage of six minutes before a group containing Sonny Colbrelli (Team Bahrain Victorious) attempted to break away. The move was quickly shut down before Team DSM began to lead the chase of the duo up front, with Tim Declercq (Deceuninck–Quick-Step) also contributing to the chase. At the only categorized climb of the day, Houle took the only point on offer while the peloton crossed the top at three and a half minutes behind. Just before the intermediate sprint, a minor crash in the peloton involved Mads Pedersen (Trek–Segafredo), Simon Yates (Team BikeExchange), and Julien Simon (Team TotalEnergies), but all three escaped generally unscathed. After the duo up front took maximum points at the intermediate sprint, Colbrelli outsprinted Michael Matthews (Team BikeExchange) and Jasper Philipsen (Alpecin–Fenix) to close in on Mark Cavendish's (Deceuninck–Quick-Step) lead in the points classification as Cavendish was briefly dropped on the unclassified climb.

With around 61 kilometres (38 mi) to go, there was another crash in the peloton, with Richie Porte (INEOS Grenadiers) the most prominent of the riders involved; Porte sustained a scrape to his left elbow but was otherwise able to continue. On the final uncategorized climb, the breakaway was caught, with van der Sande dropping back first while Houle remained out in front slightly longer to win the stage's combativity award. At this point, Team BikeExchange tried to drop the pure sprinters on the final uncategorized climb, albeit unsuccessfully. It was also around this point that a cross-tailwind began to affect the peloton as several teams attempted to form echelons. With 28 kilometres (17 mi) to go, Colbrelli suffered an untimely puncture, forcing him to change his bike. He was down by nearly 40 seconds at one point but he would eventually make it back after a brief lull in the action. Inside the final 20 kilometres (12 mi), there were several splits in the peloton, with race leader Tadej Pogačar (UAE Team Emirates) getting briefly caught out at one point.

Despite several attempts to split the peloton, no GC contender was caught out, and the sprinters' teams began to set up for the finish. In the final sprint, Deceuninck–Quick-Step — with Kasper Asgreen, Davide Ballerini, and Michael Mørkøv — once again successfully led out Cavendish for the stage win, his third in this year's Tour and his 33rd career Tour stage win. Wout van Aert (Team Jumbo–Visma) closed fast along the barriers to take second, while Philipsen came up along the other side of Cavendish to finish third. Pogačar and the other contenders finished safely in the main peloton as the GC remained unchanged ahead of the "double Ventoux" stage.

Stage 10 Result
Rank	Rider	Team	Time
1	Mark Cavendish (GBR)	Deceuninck–Quick-Step	4h 14' 07"
2	Wout van Aert (BEL)	Team Jumbo–Visma	+ 0"
3	Jasper Philipsen (BEL)	Alpecin–Fenix	+ 0"
4	Nacer Bouhanni (FRA)	Arkéa–Samsic	+ 0"
5	Michael Matthews (AUS)	Team BikeExchange	+ 0"
6	Michael Mørkøv (DEN)	Deceuninck–Quick-Step	+ 0"
7	André Greipel (GER)	Israel Start-Up Nation	+ 0"
8	Peter Sagan (SVK)	Bora–Hansgrohe	+ 0"
9	Anthony Turgis (FRA)	Team TotalEnergies	+ 0"
10	Cees Bol (NED)	Team DSM	+ 0"

General classification after Stage 10
Rank	Rider	Team	Time
1	Tadej Pogačar (SLO)	UAE Team Emirates	38h 25' 17"
2	Ben O'Connor (AUS)	AG2R Citroën Team	+ 2' 01"
3	Rigoberto Urán (COL)	EF Education–Nippo	+ 5' 18"
4	Jonas Vingegaard (DEN)	Team Jumbo–Visma	+ 5' 32"
5	Richard Carapaz (ECU)	INEOS Grenadiers	+ 5' 33"
6	Enric Mas (ESP)	Movistar Team	+ 5' 47"
7	Wilco Kelderman (NED)	Bora–Hansgrohe	+ 5' 58"
8	Alexey Lutsenko (KAZ)	Astana–Premier Tech	+ 6' 12"
9	Guillaume Martin (FRA)	Cofidis	+ 7' 02"
10	David Gaudu (FRA)	Groupama–FDJ	+ 7' 22"

== Stage 11 ==
7 July 2021 – Sorgues to Malaucène, 198.9 km (123.6 mi)

Stage 11

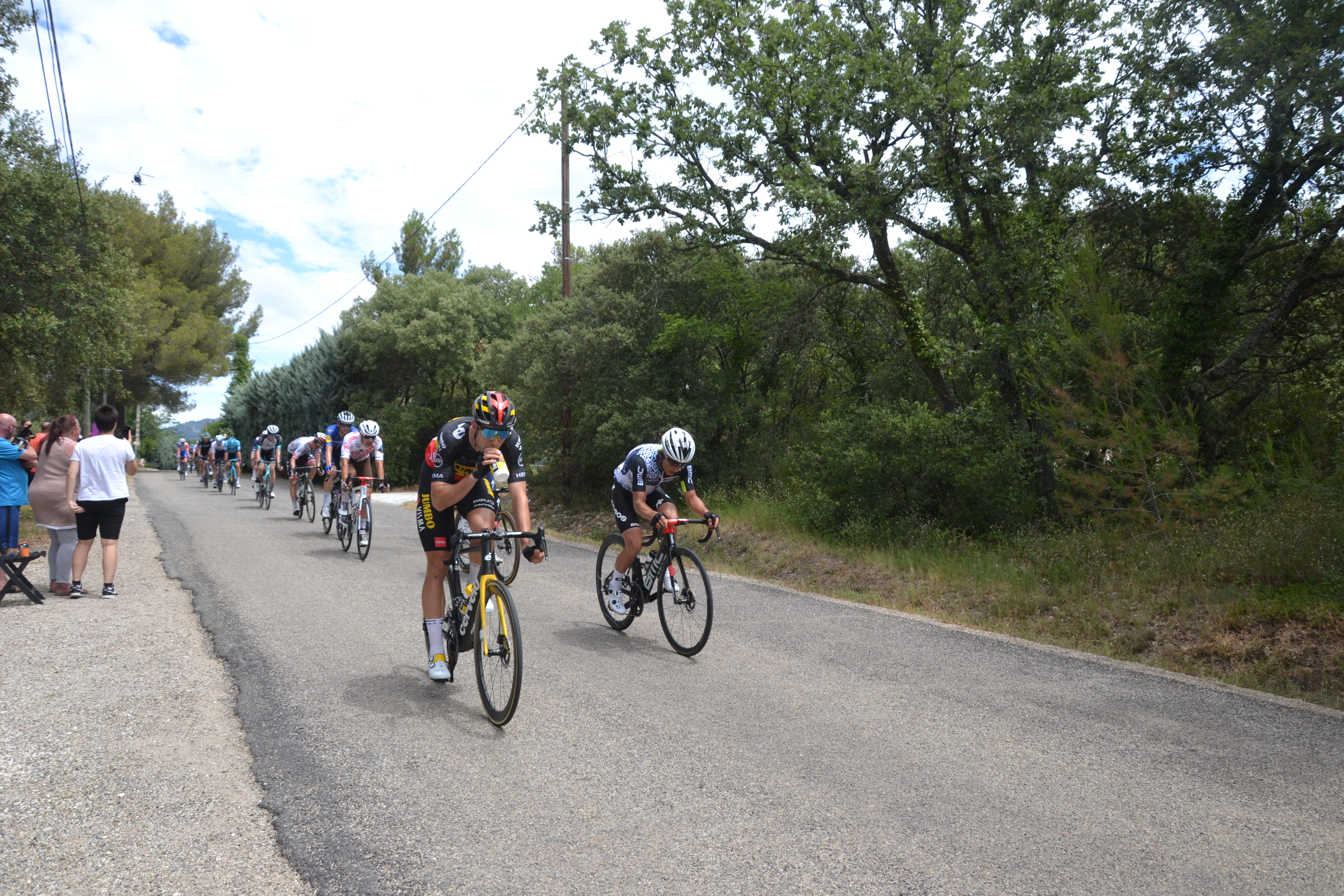
Eventual stage winner Wout van Aert in the peloton on the Côte de Fontaine-de-Vaucluse

Wout van Aert in Malaucène, about to win the stage

The eleventh stage took the riders from Sorgues to Malaucène, with the riders tackling the climb of Mont Ventoux twice. The climb was last featured in the Tour in 2016, when the stage finished at Chalet Reynard due to strong winds at the top. The early part of the stage featured a pair of fourth-category climbs, the Côte de Fontaine-de-Vaucluse and the Côte de Gordes, sandwiching an intermediate sprint in Les Imberts. After 71.9 kilometres (44.7 mi), the riders tackled the first-category Col de la Liguière, 9.3 kilometres (5.8 mi) long with an average gradient of 6.7 percent. Following the descent, the riders reached Sault, near the foot of the first passage of Mont Ventoux. The ascent from Sault, at 22 kilometres (14 mi) long with an average gradient of 5.1 percent, is classified as a first-category climb. For the first 16 kilometres (9.9 mi), the gradients are not particularly steep but after reaching Chalet Reynard, the average gradient punches up to over 8 percent. After cresting the top, the riders descended towards Malaucène, where they passed near the finish line. Afterwards, the riders circled back through Bédoin to summit Mont Ventoux again, this time as an hors catégorie climb. The ascent from Bédoin is shorter in length, at 15.7 kilometres (9.8 mi), but is steeper with an average gradient of 8.8 percent. At the top of the second ascent, bonus seconds of eight, five, and two were offered to the first three riders across. Additionally, it offered double points for the mountains classification. Afterwards, the riders descended into Malaucène again, this time for the stage finish.

Several attacks once again marked the start of the stage. After a few kilometres, Tony Martin (Team Jumbo–Visma) crashed into a ditch, forcing him to abandon the race and leaving the team with only five riders. Julian Alaphilippe (Deceuninck–Quick-Step) and Nairo Quintana (Arkéa–Samsic) soon attacked off the front, with Alaphilippe eventually pushing on on the first climb of the day. He was soon joined by Dan Martin (Israel Start-Up Nation), Anthony Perez (Cofidis), and Pierre Rolland (B&B Hotels p/b KTM). A 13-man chase group including Wout van Aert (Team Jumbo–Visma) also formed behind while INEOS Grenadiers proceeded to control the peloton. On the Col de la Liguière, Dan Martin took maximum points while the peloton crested the top around five minutes down. On the first ascent of Mont Ventoux, Alaphilippe led an attack that split the break, while behind in the peloton, David Gaudu (Groupama–FDJ), who was in the top ten on GC, began to struggle. Near the top, Bauke Mollema (Trek–Segafredo) bridged over from the second group to the front group. At the top, Alaphilippe took maximum points while the peloton crossed the top at around four and a half minutes behind. As the break neared the foot of the second ascent of Mont Ventoux, Perez was dropped, with Julien Bernard (Trek–Segafredo) following suit shortly after pacing for his teammates. At the bottom of the climb, Kenny Elissonde (Trek–Segafredo) attacked the break while a chase group composed of Alaphilippe, van Aert, and Mollema formed behind. Van Aert eventually bridged over to Elissonde, and around 11 kilometres (6.8 mi) from the summit, pushed on alone. Behind, Mollema dropped Alaphilippe and bridged up to Elissonde. On the descent, van Aert maintained his lead to win the stage. Elissonde and Mollema crossed the line together over a minute later, with the former winning the stage's combativity award.

Meanwhile, from behind, INEOS Grenadiers continued to pace the peloton. With around 11 kilometres (6.8 mi) to the top, Ben O'Connor (AG2R Citroën Team), second in the GC, was unable to keep up with the pace. Michał Kwiatkowski (INEOS Grenadiers) soon increased the pace further, causing Enric Mas (Movistar Team), Pello Bilbao (Team Bahrain Victorious), and Guillaume Martin (Cofidis) to be distanced as well. 2 kilometres (1.2 mi) from the top of the Ventoux, Jonas Vingegaard (Team Jumbo–Visma) launched an attack that was only followed by the race leader, Tadej Pogačar (UAE Team Emirates). Richard Carapaz (INEOS Grenadiers) and Rigoberto Urán (EF Education–Nippo) also tried to follow but they were not able to hold Pogačar's wheel. Further up the climb, Vingegaard managed to drop Pogačar, gradually increasing his advantage towards the top. Vingegaard crossed the top around 40 seconds ahead of Pogačar, with Carapaz and Urán riding closely behind the race leader. On the descent, Pogačar, Carapaz, and Urán worked together to bring back Vingegaard, eventually catching him near the flamme rouge. The quartet was led home by Pogačar, 1' 38" behind van Aert. Alexey Lutsenko (Astana–Premier Tech) and Wilco Kelderman (Bora–Hansgrohe), who were dropped when Vingegaard attacked, limited their losses and finished 18 seconds behind the yellow jersey group. Mas conceded almost a minute and a half while Bilbao lost almost two minutes. Martin also proceeded to lose nearly two and a half minutes. At the back of the race, after pacing for team leader Carapaz earlier in the stage, INEOS Grenadiers domestique Luke Rowe hit the wall and finished six minutes outside of the time cut, making it a total of eight riders to fall victim to the stage.

In the GC, Pogačar kept the maillot jaune, now with an advantage of 5' 18" over Urán in second with Vingegaard in third at 5' 32" down. Carapaz sat in fourth, one second behind Vingegaard while O'Connor lost four minutes to drop down to fifth. Kelderman and Lutsenko were still less than a minute behind Vingegaard while Mas dropped down to eighth. Martin and Bilbao rounded out the top ten. The biggest loser on the day was Gaudu, who lost over 25 minutes, effectively ending his GC aspirations.

Stage 11 Result
Rank	Rider	Team	Time
1	Wout van Aert (BEL)	Team Jumbo–Visma	5h 17' 43"
2	Kenny Elissonde (FRA)	Trek–Segafredo	+ 1' 14"
3	Bauke Mollema (NED)	Trek–Segafredo	+ 1' 14"
4	Tadej Pogačar (SLO)	UAE Team Emirates	+ 1' 38"
5	Rigoberto Urán (COL)	EF Education–Nippo	+ 1' 38"
6	Richard Carapaz (ECU)	INEOS Grenadiers	+ 1' 38"
7	Jonas Vingegaard (DEN)	Team Jumbo–Visma	+ 1' 38"
8	Alexey Lutsenko (KAZ)	Astana–Premier Tech	+ 1' 56"
9	Wilco Kelderman (NED)	Bora–Hansgrohe	+ 1' 56"
10	Enric Mas (ESP)	Movistar Team	+ 3' 02"

General classification after Stage 11
Rank	Rider	Team	Time
1	Tadej Pogačar (SLO)	UAE Team Emirates	43h 44' 38"
2	Rigoberto Urán (COL)	EF Education–Nippo	+ 5' 18"
3	Jonas Vingegaard (DEN)	Team Jumbo–Visma	+ 5' 32"
4	Richard Carapaz (ECU)	INEOS Grenadiers	+ 5' 33"
5	Ben O'Connor (AUS)	AG2R Citroën Team	+ 5' 58"
6	Wilco Kelderman (NED)	Bora–Hansgrohe	+ 6' 16"
7	Alexey Lutsenko (KAZ)	Astana–Premier Tech	+ 6' 30"
8	Enric Mas (ESP)	Movistar Team	+ 7' 11"
9	Guillaume Martin (FRA)	Cofidis	+ 9' 29"
10	Pello Bilbao (ESP)	Team Bahrain Victorious	+ 10' 28"
