= UCI Road World Championships – Mixed team relay =

Race details
- Date: End of season
- Discipline: Team time trial
- Type: One-day
- Organiser: UCI

History
- First edition: 2019
- Editions: 7 (as of 2026)
- First winner: Netherlands
- Most wins: Switzerland / Australia(2 wins)
- Most recent: Italy

The UCI Road World Championships – Mixed team relay is a world championship for road bicycle racing in the discipline of team time trial. It is organized by the world governing body, the Union Cycliste Internationale (UCI). First staged at the 2019 UCI Road World Championships, it replaced the men's and women's team time trial events.

The race is held with national teams, which each have 6 riders per team, 3 women and 3 men. The event features two laps of a course around 15 kilometres (9.3 mi) to 20 kilometres (12 mi) in length, with the women and men each doing one lap, one after another. The team with the shortest time to complete both laps wins.

== Medal winners ==
Championships	Gold	Silver	Bronze
2019 Yorkshire	Netherlands: Lucinda Brand; Riejanne Markus; Amy Pieters; Koen Bouwman; Bauke Mollema; Jos van Emden	Germany: Lisa Brennauer; Lisa Klein; Mieke Kröger; Tony Martin; Nils Politt; Jasha Sütterlin	Great Britain: Lauren Dolan; Anna Henderson; Joscelin Lowden; John Archibald; Daniel Bigham; Harry Tanfield
2021 Brugge	Germany: Lisa Brennauer; Lisa Klein; Mieke Kröger; Nikias Arndt; Tony Martin; Max Walscheid	Netherlands: Annemiek van Vleuten; Ellen van Dijk; Riejanne Markus; Koen Bouwman; Bauke Mollema; Jos van Emden	Italy: Marta Cavalli; Elena Cecchini; Elisa Longo Borghini; Edoardo Affini; Filippo Ganna; Matteo Sobrero
2022 Wollongong	Switzerland: Mauro Schmid; Stefan Küng; Stefan Bissegger; Elise Chabbey; Marlen Reusser; Nicole Koller	Italy: Edoardo Affini; Matteo Sobrero; Filippo Ganna; Elisa Longo Borghini; Elena Cecchini; Vittoria Guazzini	Australia: Michael Matthews; Luke Plapp; Luke Durbridge; Georgia Baker; Alexandra Manly; Sarah Roy
2023 Glasgow	Switzerland: Mauro Schmid; Stefan Küng; Stefan Bissegger; Elise Chabbey; Marlen Reusser; Nicole Koller	France: Rémi Cavagna; Bruno Armirail; Bryan Coquard; Juliette Labous; Cédrine Kerbaol; Audrey Cordon-Ragot	Germany: Jannik Steimle; Max Walscheid; Miguel Heidemann; Ricarda Bauernfeind; Franziska Koch; Lisa Klein
2024 Zurich	Australia: Michael Matthews; Ben O'Connor; Jay Vine; Grace Brown; Brodie Chapman; Ruby Roseman-Gannon	Germany: Marco Brenner; Miguel Heidemann; Maximilian Schachmann; Franziska Koch; Liane Lippert; Antonia Niedermaier	Italy: Edoardo Affini; Mattia Cattaneo; Filippo Ganna; Elisa Longo Borghini; Soraya Paladin; Gaia Realini
2025 Kigali	Australia: Michael Matthews Lucas Plapp Jay Vine Brodie Chapman Amanda Spratt Felicity Wilson-Haffenden	France: Bruno Armirail Paul Seixas Pavel Sivakov Cédrine Kerbaol Juliette Labous Maeva Squiban	Switzerland: Jan Christen Stefan Küng Mauro Schmid Jasmin Liechti Marlen Reusser Noemi Rüegg
2026 Montreal	Italy: Mattia Cattaneo Filippo Ganna Matteo Sobrero Vittoria Guazzini Elisa Longo Borghini Monica Trinca Colonel	France: Bruno Armirail Rémi Cavagna Jordan Labrosse Juliette Berthet Cédrine Kerbaol Marion Borras	Switzerland: Stefan Bissegger Stefan Küng Jasmin Liechti Marlen Reusser Noemi Rüegg Mauro Schmid

== Medals by nation ==
Rank	Nation	Gold	Silver	Bronze	Total
1	Switzerland (SUI)	2	0	2	4
2	Australia (AUS)	2	0	1	3
3	Germany (GER)	1	2	1	4
4	Italy (ITA)	1	1	2	4
5	Netherlands (NED)	1	1	0	2
6	France (FRA)	0	3	0	3
7	Great Britain (GBR)	0	0	1	1
Totals (7 entries)		7	7	7	21
