= 2021 UCI Road World Championships – Mixed team relay =

Mixed team relay
2021 UCI Road World Championships

Race details
- Dates: 22 September 2021
- Stages: 1
- Distance: 44.5 km (27.7 mi)
- Winning time: 50' 49.10"

Medalists
	Gold	Germany
	Silver	Netherlands
	Bronze	Italy

The Mixed team relay of the 2021 UCI Road World Championships was a cycling event that took place on 22 September 2021 between Knokke-Heist and Brugge, Belgium. It was the second time the event had been held, as it replaced the men's and women's team time trial from previous editions.

== Results ==
Place	Riders	Team	Time
1	Lisa Brennauer; Lisa Klein; Mieke Kröger; Nikias Arndt; Tony Martin; Max Walscheid	Germany	50:49.10
2	Annemiek van Vleuten; Ellen van Dijk; Riejanne Markus; Koen Bouwman; Bauke Mollema; Jos van Emden	Netherlands	+12.79
3	Marta Cavalli; Elena Cecchini; Elisa Longo Borghini; Edoardo Affini; Filippo Ganna; Matteo Sobrero	Italy	+37.74
4	Marlen Reusser; Stefan Küng; Elise Chabbey; Stefan Bissegger; Mauro Schmid; Nicole Koller	Switzerland	+37.79
5	John Archibald; Alice Barnes; Anna Henderson; Daniel Bigham; Alex Dowsett; Joscelin Lowden	Great Britain	+54.99
6	Amalie Dideriksen; Emma Norsgaard; Julie Leth; Mikkel Bjerg; Mathias Norsgaard; Magnus Cort Nielsen	Denmark	+1:16.16
7	Shari Bossuyt; Jolien d'Hoore; Lotte Kopecky; Victor Campenaerts; Ben Hermans; Yves Lampaert	Belgium	+1:21.03
8	Coryn Rivera; Leah Thomas; Ruth Winder; Lawson Craddock; Brandon McNulty; Neilson Powless	United States	+2:09.68
9	Marion Borras; Clara Copponi; Coralie Demay; Thomas Denis; Valentin Tabellion; Benjamin Thomas	France	+2:51.79
10	Karolina Karasiewicz; Karolina Kumiega; Aurela Nerlo; Filip Maciejuk; Damian Papierski; Bartosz Rudyk	Poland	+3:23.18
11	Ziortza Isasi; Sara Martin Martin; Lourdes Oyarbide; Xabier Azparren; Diego López; Lluís Mas	Spain	+4:05.55
12	Sarah Rijkes; Christina Schweinberger; Kathrin Schweinberger; Tobias Bayer; Felix Ritzinger; Maximilian Schmidbauer	Austria	+4:33.00
13	(Lithuania) Akvilė Gedraitytė (Belarus) Anastasiya Kolesava (Slovakia) Tereza Medveďová (Burkina Faso) Paul Daumont (Rwanda) Jean Eric Habimana (Syria) Ahmad Wais	World Cycling Centre	+6:28.98
