= 2019 UCI Road World Championships – Mixed team relay =

Mixed team relay
2019 UCI Road World Championships

Race details
- Dates: 22 September 2019
- Stages: 1
- Distance: 27.6 km (17.1 mi)
- Winning time: 38' 27.60"

Medalists
	Gold	Netherlands
	Silver	Germany
	Bronze	Great Britain

The Mixed team relay of the 2019 UCI Road World Championships was a cycling event that took place on 22 September 2019 in Harrogate, England. It was the first time the event had been held, as it replaced the men's and women's team time trial from previous editions.

The course consisted of two laps of a 27.6 km (17.1 mi) circuit through the town of Harrogate in North Yorkshire. The three men started first and passed the baton to three women after one lap. The time was taken from the second rider to finish from each team.

== Results ==
Place	Riders	Team	Time
1	Lucinda Brand; Koen Bouwman; Jos van Emden; Riejanne Markus; Bauke Mollema; Amy Pieters	Netherlands	38' 27.60"
2	Lisa Brennauer; Lisa Klein; Mieke Kröger; Tony Martin; Nils Politt; Jasha Sütterlin	Germany	+ 22"
3	John Archibald; Daniel Bigham; Lauren Dolan; Anna Henderson; Joscelin Lowden; Harry Tanfield	United Kingdom	+ 51"
4	Edoardo Affini; Elena Cecchini; Tatiana Guderzo; Elisa Longo Borghini; Davide Martinelli; Elia Viviani	Italy	+ 53"
5	Bruno Armirail; Aude Biannic; Jérôme Cousin; Coralie Demay; Séverine Eraud; Romain Seigle	France	+ 1'23"
6	Elise Chabbey; Robin Froidevaux; Claudio Imhof; Marlen Reusser; Kathrin Stirnemann; Joel Suter	Switzerland	+ 1'27"
7	Urška Bravec; Eugenia Bujak; Urša Pintar; Tadej Pogačar; Jaka Primožič; Jan Tratnik	Slovenia	+ 1'58"
8	Louise Norman Hansen; Julius Johansen; Julie Leth; Christoffer Lisson; Martin Toft Madsen; Pernille Mathiesen	Denmark	+ 2'04"
9	Jan Bakelants; Sofie De Vuyst; Valerie Demey; Frederik Frison; Senne Leysen; Julie Van de Velde	Belgium	+ 2'33"
10	Jonathan Castroviejo; Mavi García; Sheyla Gutiérrez; Lluís Mas; Sebastián Mora; Lourdes Oyarbide	Spain	+ 2'43"
11	(Trinidad and Tobago) Teniel Campbell (Republic of Ireland) Dillon Corkery (Canada) Ben Katerberg (Czech Republic) Petr Kelemen (Belarus) Anastasiya Kolesava (Argentina) Fernanda Yapura	World Cycling Centre	+ 3'29"
