= 2019 UCI Road World Championships – Men's road race =

Cycling race

Men's road race
2019 UCI Road World Championships
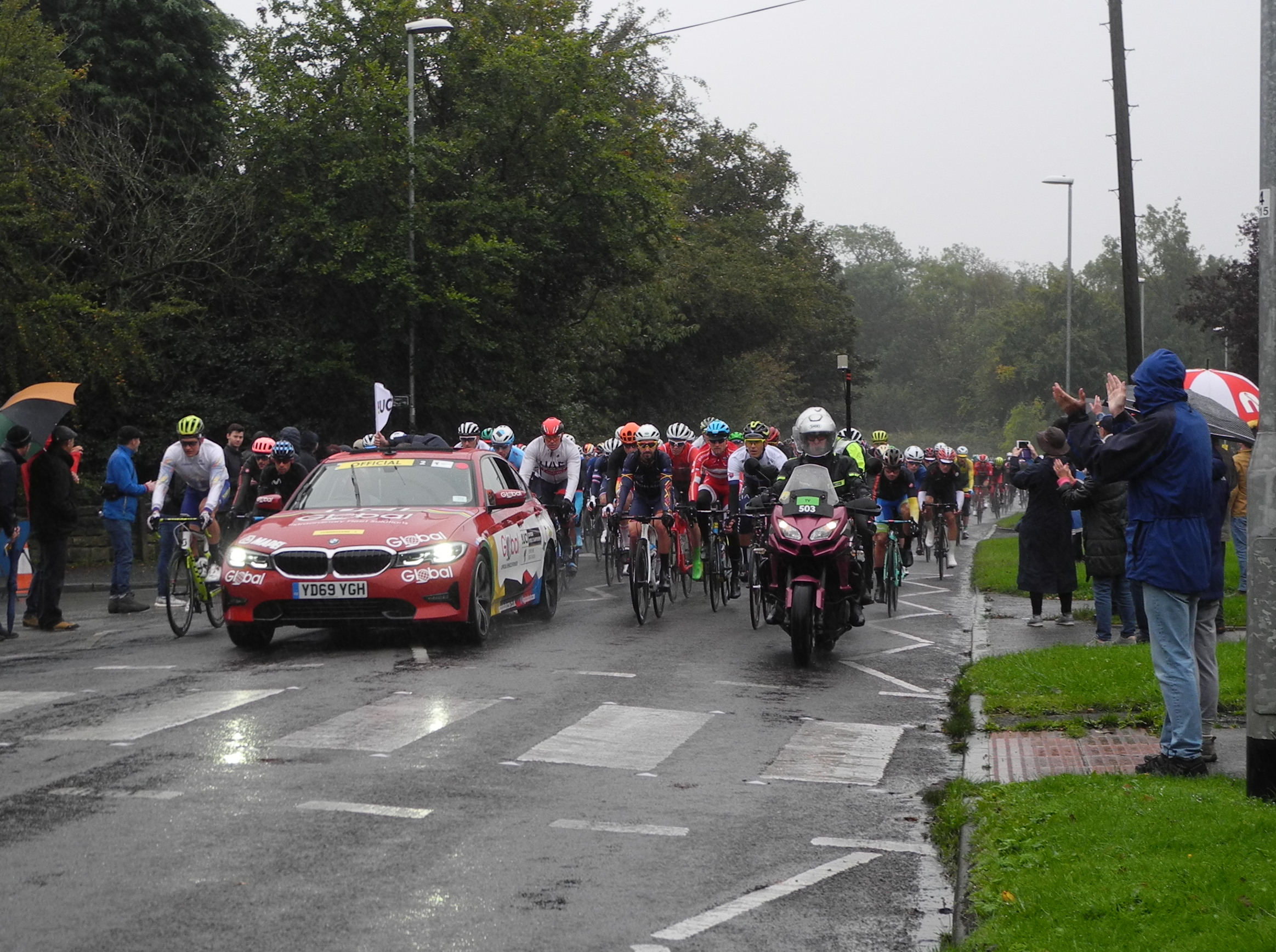
- The start of the race in Leeds

Race details
- Dates: 29 September 2019
- Stages: 1
- Distance: 260.7 km (162.0 mi)
- Winning time: 6h 27' 28"

Medalists
	Gold	(Denmark) Mads Pedersen (DEN)
	Silver	(Italy) Matteo Trentin (ITA)
	Bronze	(Switzerland) Stefan Küng (SUI)

The Men's road race of the 2019 UCI Road World Championships was a cycling event that took place on 29 September 2019 in Yorkshire, England. The race was initially scheduled to be contested over 280 kilometres (170 miles), but due to flooding on the course, the race was reduced to 260.7 kilometres (162.0 miles). The wet weather also meant there was a limited broadcast coverage of the race.

For the first time in the race's history, a Danish rider won the world title as Mads Pedersen out-sprinted two other riders at the finish in Harrogate to take the rainbow jersey. The silver medal went to Italy's Matteo Trentin, while the bronze medal went to Stefan Küng of Switzerland.

== Qualification ==
Qualification was based mainly on the UCI World Ranking by nations as of 11 August 2019.

=== UCI World Rankings ===
The following nations qualified.

Criterium	Rank	Number of riders		Nations
Criterium	Rank	To enter	To start	Nations
UCI World Ranking by Nations	1–10	13	8	France; Belgium; Italy; Netherlands; Spain; Colombia; Germany; Australia; Slovenia; Denmark
UCI World Ranking by Nations	11–20	9	6	Great Britain; Norway; Austria; Poland; Czech Republic; Switzerland; Russia; Portugal; Ireland; Canada
UCI World Ranking by Nations	21–30	7	4	Kazakhstan; South Africa; Ecuador; United States; Slovakia; Estonia; Eritrea; New Zealand; Luxembourg; Latvia
UCI World Ranking by Nations	31–50	2	1	Ukraine; Belarus; Turkey; Algeria; Japan; Romania; Greece; Lithuania; Iran; Hungary; Venezuela; Costa Rica; Mexico; Sweden; Argentina; Morocco; Guatemala; South Korea; Rwanda; Croatia
UCI World Ranking by Individuals (if not already qualified)	1–200	2	1	—

=== Continental champions ===
Name	Country	Reason
Alejandro Valverde	Spain	Outgoing World Champion
Mekseb Debesay	Eritrea	African Champion
Yevgeniy Gidich	Kazakhstan	Asian Champion
Jefferson Cepeda	Ecuador	Panamerican Champion

=== Participating nations ===
197 cyclists from 42 nations were entered in the men's road race. The number of cyclists per nation is shown in parentheses.

- Argentina (1)
- Australia (8)
- Austria (6)
- Belarus (2)
- Belgium (8)
- Canada (6)
- Colombia (7)
- Costa Rica (1)
- Croatia (1)
- Czech Republic (6)
- Denmark (8)
- Ecuador (4)
- Eritrea (4)
- Estonia (4)
- France (8)
- Germany (8)
- Great Britain (6)
- Greece (2)
- Hungary (2)
- Ireland (6)
- Italy (8)
- Japan (2)
- Kazakhstan (5)
- Latvia (3)
- Lithuania (2)
- Luxembourg (4)
- Namibia (1)
- Netherlands (8)
- New Zealand (4)
- Norway (6)
- Poland (6)
- Portugal (5)
- Romania (1)
- Russia (6)
- Slovakia (4)
- Slovenia (8)
- South Africa (4)
- Spain (9)
- Sweden (2)
- Switzerland (6)
- Ukraine (1)
- United States (4)

== Results ==
=== Final classification ===
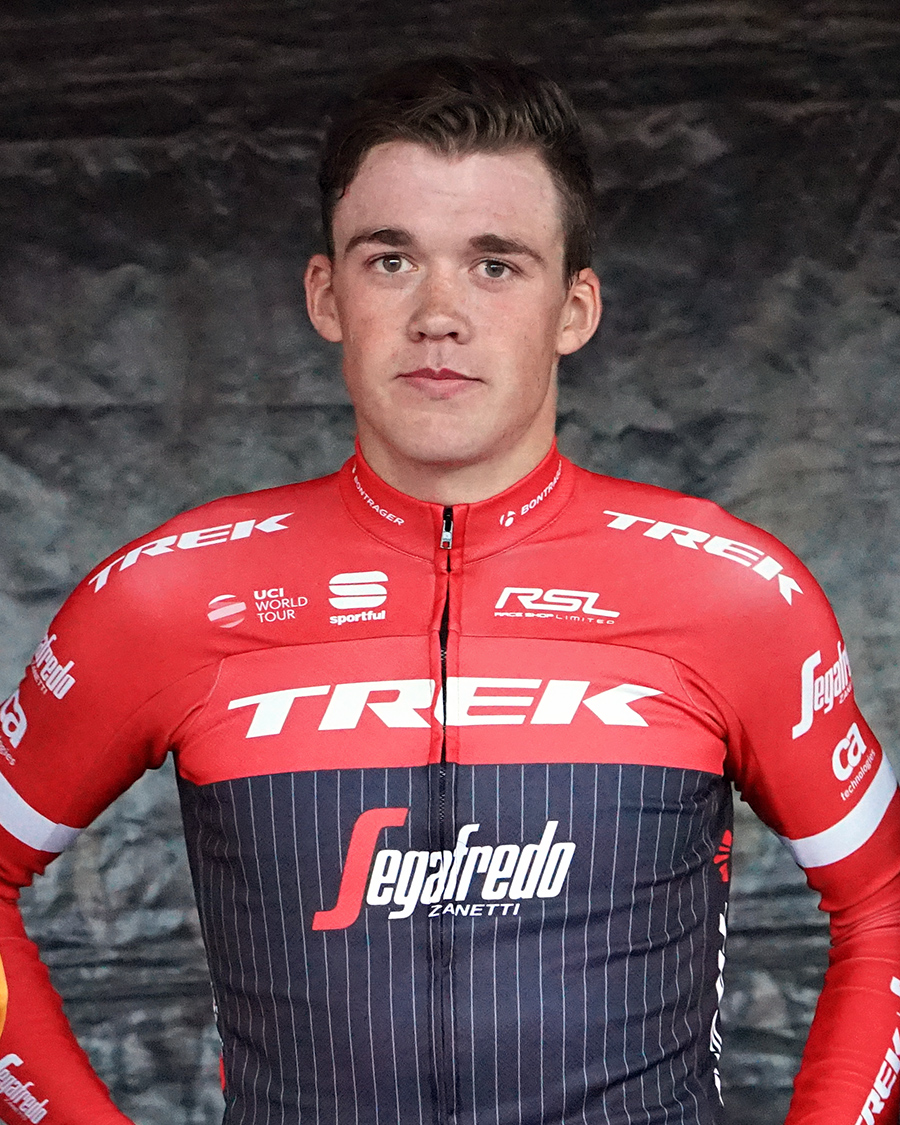
Mads Pedersen (pictured in 2017) won the race for Denmark.

Of the race's 197 entrants, 46 riders completed the full distance of 260.7 kilometres (162.0 miles).

Rank	Rider	Country	Time
1	Mads Pedersen	Denmark	6h 27' 28"
2	Matteo Trentin	Italy	+ 0"
3	Stefan Küng	Switzerland	+ 2"
4	Gianni Moscon	Italy	+ 17"
5	Peter Sagan	Slovakia	+ 43"
6	Michael Valgren	Denmark	+ 45"
7	Alexander Kristoff	Norway	+ 1' 10"
8	Greg Van Avermaet	Belgium	+ 1' 10"
9	Gorka Izagirre	Spain	+ 1' 10"
10	Rui Costa	Portugal	+ 1' 10"
11	Sonny Colbrelli	Italy	+ 1' 10"
12	Jakob Fuglsang	Denmark	+ 1' 10"
13	Zdeněk Štybar	Czech Republic	+ 1' 10"
14	Carlos Betancur	Colombia	+ 1' 10"
15	John Degenkolb	Germany	+ 1' 10"
16	Ion Izagirre	Spain	+ 1' 14"
17	Amund Grøndahl Jansen	Norway	+ 1' 14"
18	Tadej Pogačar	Slovenia	+ 1' 14"
19	Nils Politt	Germany	+ 1' 22"
20	Niki Terpstra	Netherlands	+ 1' 22"
21	Toms Skujiņš	Latvia	+ 1' 46"
22	Michael Albasini	Switzerland	+ 1' 48"
23	Tony Gallopin	France	+ 1' 50"
24	Michael Matthews	Australia	+ 1' 57"
25	Alberto Bettiol	Italy	+ 1' 57"
26	Tao Geoghegan Hart	Great Britain	+ 2' 20"
27	Marc Hirschi	Switzerland	+ 2' 20"
28	Julian Alaphilippe	France	+ 2' 26"
29	Daniel Martínez	Colombia	+ 3' 59"
30	Felix Großschartner	Austria	+ 3' 59"
31	Ben Swift	Great Britain	+ 6' 38"
32	Yves Lampaert	Belgium	+ 7' 48"
33	Oliver Naesen	Belgium	+ 8' 07"
34	Sven Erik Bystrøm	Norway	+ 8' 07"
35	Tim Wellens	Belgium	+ 8' 07"
36	Mike Teunissen	Netherlands	+ 8' 07"
37	Dylan Teuns	Belgium	+ 8' 07"
38	Esteban Chaves	Colombia	+ 8' 07"
39	Andrey Amador	Costa Rica	+ 8' 07"
40	Chad Haga	United States	+ 10' 27"
41	Neilson Powless	United States	+ 10' 27"
42	Benoît Cosnefroy	France	+ 10' 52"
43	Mathieu van der Poel	Netherlands	+ 10' 52"
44	Imanol Erviti	Spain	+ 14' 48"
45	Lucas Eriksson	Sweden	+ 14' 48"
46	Petr Vakoč	Czech Republic	+ 19' 25"

=== Failed to finish ===
149 riders failed to finish, while South Africa's Jay Thomson and Ukraine's Mark Padun failed to start.

Rider	Country
Jack Haig	Australia
Lukas Pöstlberger	Austria
Florian Sénéchal	France
Dylan van Baarle	Netherlands
Adam Yates	Great Britain
Patrick Konrad	Austria
Marco Haller	Austria
Bauke Mollema	Netherlands
Luka Pibernik	Slovenia
Alexandr Riabushenko	Belarus
Nikias Arndt	Germany
Davide Cimolai	Italy
Juraj Sagan	Slovakia
Magnus Cort	Denmark
Álvaro Hodeg	Colombia
Edvald Boasson Hagen	Norway
Michael Woods	Canada
Christophe Laporte	France
Michał Gołaś	Poland
Nathan Haas	Australia
Marc Soler	Spain
Pascal Ackermann	Germany
Ruben Guerreiro	Portugal
Alex Kirsch	Luxembourg
Alo Jakin	Estonia
Lawson Craddock	United States
Simon Clarke	Australia
Luke Durbridge	Australia
Hermann Pernsteiner	Austria
Giovanni Visconti	Italy
Alexey Lutsenko	Kazakhstan
Grega Bole	Slovenia
Simon Geschke	Germany
Geraint Thomas	Great Britain
Michael Mørkøv	Denmark
Jonathan Caicedo	Ecuador
Rémi Cavagna	France
Luis León Sánchez	Spain
Salvatore Puccio	Italy
Christopher Juul-Jensen	Denmark
Jack Bauer	New Zealand
Pieter Weening	Netherlands
Rafał Majka	Poland
Paweł Poljański	Poland
Jasha Sütterlin	Germany
Łukasz Wiśniowski	Poland
Jonathan Castroviejo	Spain
Josef Černý	Czech Republic
Kasper Asgreen	Denmark
Sam Bennett	Ireland

Rider	Country
Danilo Wyss	Switzerland
Ben Perry	Canada
Eduard-Michael Grosu	Romania
Emīls Liepiņš	Latvia
Rory Townsend	Ireland
Matej Mohorič	Slovenia
Anthony Roux	France
Diego Ulissi	Italy
Bob Jungels	Luxembourg
José Joaquín Rojas	Spain
Yukiya Arashiro	Japan
Jonas Koch	Germany
Mitchell Docker	Australia
Michael Schär	Switzerland
Casper Pedersen	Denmark
Pavel Sivakov	Russia
Eduardo Sepúlveda	Argentina
Sebastián Henao	Colombia
Carl Fredrik Hagen	Norway
Dion Smith	New Zealand
Sebastian Langeveld	Netherlands
Marcus Burghardt	Germany
Aleksandr Vlasov	Russia
Hugo Houle	Canada
Owain Doull	Great Britain
Alejandro Valverde	Spain
Tim Declercq	Belgium
Alex Howes	United States
Sergey Chernetskiy	Russia
Zhandos Bizhigitov	Kazakhstan
Nairo Quintana	Colombia
Gediminas Bagdonas	Lithuania
Conor Dunne	Ireland
Michael Gogl	Austria
Erik Baška	Slovakia
James Piccoli	Canada
Jan Polanc	Slovenia
Stylianos Farantakis	Greece
Tanel Kangert	Estonia
Kim Magnusson	Sweden
Eddie Dunbar	Ireland
José Gonçalves	Portugal
Remco Evenepoel	Belgium
Stepan Kurianov	Russia
Julien Bernard	France
David Per	Slovenia
Yevgeniy Gidich	Kazakhstan
Dmitriy Gruzdev	Kazakhstan
Ben Gastauer	Luxembourg
Silvan Dillier	Switzerland

Rider	Country
Nicholas Dlamini	South Africa
Rui Oliveira	Portugal
Maciej Bodnar	Poland
Rein Taaramäe	Estonia
Ian Stannard	Great Britain
Krists Neilands	Latvia
Vegard Stake Laengen	Norway
Evaldas Šiškevičius	Lithuania
Shane Archbold	New Zealand
Jan Bárta	Czech Republic
Hideto Nakane	Japan
Primož Roglič	Slovenia
Philippe Gilbert	Belgium
Jos van Emden	Netherlands
Dan Martin	Ireland
Yuriy Natarov	Kazakhstan
Guillaume Boivin	Canada
Rory Sutherland	Australia
Daryl Impey	South Africa
Mihkel Räim	Estonia
Nelson Oliveira	Portugal
Richard Carapaz	Ecuador
František Sisr	Czech Republic
Tom Wirtgen	Luxembourg
Juan Sebastián Molano	Colombia
Polychronis Tzortzakis	Greece
Antoine Duchesne	Canada
Antonio Barać	Croatia
Ján Andrej Cully	Slovakia
Péter Kusztor	Hungary
Roman Kreuziger	Czech Republic
Dmitry Strakhov	Russia
Jhonatan Narváez	Ecuador
Jefferson Cepeda	Ecuador
Stefan de Bod	South Africa
Ryan Mullen	Ireland
Rohan Dennis	Australia
Iván García	Spain
Jan Tratnik	Slovenia
Łukasz Owsian	Poland
Alexander Evtushenko	Russia
Natnael Berhane	Eritrea
Mekseb Debesay	Eritrea
Merhawi Kudus	Eritrea
Daniel Teklehaimanot	Eritrea
Patrick Bevin	New Zealand
Vasil Kiryienka	Belarus
Márton Dina	Hungary
Dirk Coetzee	Namibia
