= 2016 Eneco Tour =

2016 UCI World Tour, race 26 of 27

Race details
- Dates: 19–25 September 2016
- Stages: 7
- Distance: 981.9 km (610.1 mi)
- Winning time: 22h 43' 26"

Results
Jersey awarded to the overall winner	Winner	Niki Terpstra (NED)	(Etixx–Quick-Step)
	Second	Oliver Naesen (BEL)	(IAM Cycling)
	Third	Peter Sagan (SVK)	(Tinkoff)
Jersey awarded to the points classification winner	Points	Peter Sagan (SVK)	(Tinkoff)
Jersey awarded to the combativity classification winner	Combativity	Bert Van Lerberghe (BEL)	(Topsport Vlaanderen–Baloise)
	Team	Etixx–Quick-Step	

The 2016 Eneco Tour is a road cycling stage race which took place between 19 and 25 September 2016 in the Netherlands and Belgium. It was the 12th edition of the Eneco Tour stage race and the twenty-sixth race of the 2016 UCI World Tour. It was won by Niki Terpstra.

== Teams ==
The 18 UCI World Tour teams are automatically entitled and obliged to start the race. The race organisation also gave out wildcards to four UCI Professional Continental teams.

World Tour teams

- AG2R La Mondiale
- Astana
- BMC Racing Team
- Team Dimension Data
- Etixx–Quick-Step
- FDJ
- IAM Cycling
- Lampre–Merida
- Lotto–Soudal
- Movistar Team
- Team Giant–Alpecin
- Team Katusha
- LottoNL–Jumbo
- Team Sky
- Tinkoff
- Trek–Segafredo
- Cannondale–Drapac
- Orica–BikeExchange

Professional Continental teams

- Cofidis
- Roompot–Oranje Peloton
- Topsport Vlaanderen–Baloise
- Wanty–Groupe Gobert

== Schedule ==
The course for the race was announced in March 2016.

Stage	Date	Route	Distance	Type	Winner
1	19 September	Bolsward (Netherlands) to Bolsward (Netherlands)	184,5 km (114.6 mi)	Flat stage	Dylan Groenewegen (NED)
2	20 September	Breda (Netherlands) to Breda (Netherlands)	9,6 km (6 mi)	Individual time trial	Rohan Dennis (AUS)
3	21 September	Blankenberge (Belgium) to Ardooie (Belgium)	184,5 km (114.6 mi)	Flat stage	Peter Sagan (SVK)
4	22 September	Aalter (Belgium) to Sint-Pieters-Leeuw (Belgium)	199 km (123.7 mi)	Flat stage	Peter Sagan (SVK)
5	23 September	Sittard-Geleen (Netherlands) to Sittard-Geleen (Netherlands)	20,9 km (13 mi)	Team time trial	BMC Racing Team
6	24 September	Riemst (Belgium) to Lanaken (Belgium)	177,5 km (110.3 mi)	Hilly stage	Luka Pibernik (SVN)
7	25 September	Bornem (Belgium) to Geraardsbergen (Belgium)	195 km (121.2 mi)	Hilly stage	Edvald Boasson Hagen (NOR)

== Stages ==
=== Stage 1 ===
19 September 2016 — Bolsward to Bolsward, 184.5 km (114.6 mi)

Stage 1 Result

	Rider	Team	Time
1	Dylan Groenewegen (NED)	LottoNL–Jumbo	4h 14' 00"
2	Nacer Bouhanni (FRA)	Cofidis	s.t.
3	Peter Sagan (SVK)	Tinkoff	s.t.
4	Edvald Boasson Hagen (NOR)	Team Dimension Data	s.t.
5	Alexander Kristoff (NOR)	Team Katusha	s.t.
6	Giacomo Nizzolo (ITA)	Trek–Segafredo	s.t.
7	Arnaud Démare (FRA)	FDJ	s.t.
8	Andrea Guardini (ITA)	Astana	s.t.
9	Marcel Kittel (GER)	Etixx–Quick-Step	s.t.
10	Roy Jans (BEL)	Wanty–Groupe Gobert	s.t.

General Classification after Stage 1

	Rider	Team	Time
1	Dylan Groenewegen (NED)	LottoNL–Jumbo	4h 13' 50"
2	Nacer Bouhanni (FRA)	Cofidis	+ 4"
3	Frederik Backaert (BEL)	Wanty–Groupe Gobert	+ 4"
4	Laurens de Vreese (BEL)	Astana	+ 5"
5	Peter Sagan (SVK)	Tinkoff	+ 6"
6	Matteo Bono (ITA)	Lampre–Merida	+ 7"
7	Bert van Lerberghe (BEL)	Topsport Vlaanderen–Baloise	+ 8"
8	Brian van Goethem (NED)	Roompot–Oranje Peloton	+ 8"
9	Edvald Boasson Hagen (NOR)	Team Dimension Data	+ 10"
10	Alexander Kristoff (NOR)	Team Katusha	+ 10"

=== Stage 2 ===
20 September 2016 — Breda to Breda, 9.6 km (6.0 mi) Individual time trial (ITT)

Stage 2 Result

	Rider	Team	Time
1	Rohan Dennis (AUS)	BMC Racing Team	10' 48"
2	Jos van Emden (NED)	LottoNL–Jumbo	+ 5"
3	Jasha Sütterlin (GER)	Movistar Team	+ 14"
4	Wilco Kelderman (NED)	LottoNL–Jumbo	+ 15"
5	Matthias Brändle (AUT)	IAM Cycling	+ 15"
6	Primož Roglič (SVN)	LottoNL–Jumbo	+ 16"
7	Taylor Phinney (USA)	BMC Racing Team	+ 16"
8	Peter Sagan (SVK)	Tinkoff	+ 17"
9	Marcel Kittel (GER)	Etixx–Quick-Step	+ 17"
10	Alex Dowsett (GBR)	Movistar Team	+ 18"

General Classification after Stage 2

	Rider	Team	Time
1	Rohan Dennis (AUS)	BMC Racing Team	4h 24' 48"
2	Jos van Emden (NED)	LottoNL–Jumbo	+ 5"
3	Peter Sagan (SVK)	Tinkoff	+ 13"
4	Jasha Sütterlin (GER)	Movistar Team	+ 14"
5	Wilco Kelderman (NED)	LottoNL–Jumbo	+ 15"
6	Matthias Brändle (AUT)	IAM Cycling	+ 15"
7	Primož Roglič (SVN)	LottoNL–Jumbo	+ 16"
8	Taylor Phinney (USA)	BMC Racing Team	+ 16"
9	Marcel Kittel (GER)	Etixx–Quick-Step	+ 17"
10	Alex Dowsett (GBR)	Movistar Team	+ 18"

=== Stage 3 ===
21 September 2016 — Blankenberge to Ardooie, 184.5 km (114.6 mi)

Stage 3 Result

	Rider	Team	Time
1	Peter Sagan (SVK)	Tinkoff	4h 10' 36"
2	Danny van Poppel (NED)	Team Sky	s.t.
3	Nacer Bouhanni (FRA)	Cofidis	s.t.
4	Dylan Groenewegen (NED)	LottoNL–Jumbo	s.t.
5	Mark McNally (GBR)	Wanty–Groupe Gobert	s.t.
6	Giacomo Nizzolo (ITA)	Trek–Segafredo	s.t.
7	Martin Elmiger (SUI)	IAM Cycling	s.t.
8	Marcel Kittel (GER)	Etixx–Quick-Step	s.t.
9	André Greipel (GER)	Lotto–Soudal	s.t.
10	Alexander Kristoff (NOR)	Team Katusha	s.t.

General Classification after Stage 3

	Rider	Team	Time
1	Rohan Dennis (AUS)	BMC Racing Team	8h 35' 24"
2	Peter Sagan (SVK)	Tinkoff	+ 3"
3	Jos van Emden (NED)	LottoNL–Jumbo	+ 5"
4	Jasha Sütterlin (GER)	Movistar Team	+ 14"
5	Martin Elmiger (SUI)	IAM Cycling	+ 14"
6	Wilco Kelderman (NED)	LottoNL–Jumbo	+ 15"
7	Matthias Brändle (AUT)	IAM Cycling	+ 15"
8	Primož Roglič (SVN)	LottoNL–Jumbo	+ 16"
9	Taylor Phinney (USA)	BMC Racing Team	+ 16"
10	Marcel Kittel (GER)	Etixx–Quick-Step	+ 17"

=== Stage 4 ===
22 September 2016 — Aalter to Sint-Pieters-Leeuw, 199 km (123.7 mi)

Stage 4 Result

	Rider	Team	Time
1	Peter Sagan (SVK)	Tinkoff	4h 42' 12"
2	André Greipel (GER)	Lotto–Soudal	s.t.
3	Alexander Kristoff (NOR)	Team Katusha	s.t.
4	Arnaud Démare (FRA)	FDJ	s.t.
5	Dylan Groenewegen (NED)	LottoNL–Jumbo	s.t.
6	John Degenkolb (GER)	Team Giant–Alpecin	s.t.
7	Reinardt Janse van Rensburg (RSA)	Team Dimension Data	s.t.
8	Amaury Capiot (BEL)	Topsport Vlaanderen–Baloise	s.t.
9	Giacomo Nizzolo (ITA)	Trek–Segafredo	s.t.
10	Luka Mezgec (SVN)	Orica–BikeExchange	s.t.

General Classification after Stage 4

	Rider	Team	Time
1	Peter Sagan (SVK)	Tinkoff	13h 17' 29"
2	Rohan Dennis (AUS)	BMC Racing Team	+ 7"
3	Jos van Emden (NED)	LottoNL–Jumbo	+ 12"
4	Andrei Grivko (UKR)	Astana	+ 20"
5	Jasha Sütterlin (GER)	Movistar Team	+ 21"
6	Martin Elmiger (SUI)	IAM Cycling	+ 21"
7	Wilco Kelderman (NED)	LottoNL–Jumbo	+ 22"
8	Matthias Brändle (AUT)	IAM Cycling	+ 22"
9	Primož Roglič (SVN)	LottoNL–Jumbo	+ 23"
10	Taylor Phinney (USA)	BMC Racing Team	+ 23"

=== Stage 5 ===
23 September 2016 — Sittard-Geleen to Sittard-Geleen, 20.9 km (13.0 mi) Team time trial (TTT)

Stage 5 Result

	Team	Time
1	BMC Racing Team	23' 11"
2	Etixx–Quick-Step	+ 6"
3	LottoNL–Jumbo	+ 23"
4	Movistar Team	+ 25"
5	IAM Cycling	+ 26"
6	Lotto–Soudal	+ 29"
7	Team Giant–Alpecin	+ 33"
8	Tinkoff	+ 34"
9	Team Sky	+ 38"
10	FDJ	+ 40"

General Classification after Stage 5

	Rider	Team	Time
1	Rohan Dennis (AUS)	BMC Racing Team	13h 40' 47"
2	Taylor Phinney (USA)	BMC Racing Team	+ 16"
3	Tony Martin (GER)	Etixx–Quick-Step	+ 24"
4	Peter Sagan (SVK)	Tinkoff	+ 27"
5	Niki Terpstra (NED)	Etixx–Quick-Step	+ 27"
6	Jos van Emden (NED)	LottoNL–Jumbo	+ 28"
7	Manuel Quinziato (ITA)	BMC Racing Team	+ 29"
8	Greg van Avermaet (BEL)	BMC Racing Team	+ 33"
9	Bob Jungels (LUX)	Etixx–Quick-Step	+ 36"
10	Marcel Kittel (GER)	Etixx–Quick-Step	+ 37"

=== Stage 6 ===
24 September 2016 — Riemst to Lanaken, 177.5 km (110.3 mi)

Stage 6 Result

	Rider	Team	Time
1	Luka Pibernik (SVN)	Lampre–Merida	4h 28' 45"
2	Mark McNally (GBR)	Wanty–Groupe Gobert	s.t.
3	Bert van Lerberghe (BEL)	Topsport Vlaanderen–Baloise	s.t.
4	Alexis Gougeard (FRA)	AG2R La Mondiale	s.t.
5	Chad Haga (USA)	Team Giant–Alpecin	s.t.
6	Giacomo Nizzolo (ITA)	Trek–Segafredo	+ 5"
7	Nacer Bouhanni (FRA)	Cofidis	+ 5"
8	Edvald Boasson Hagen (NOR)	Team Dimension Data	+ 5"
9	Arnaud Démare (FRA)	FDJ	+ 5"
10	Jonas van Genechten (BEL)	IAM Cycling	+ 5"

General Classification after Stage 6

	Rider	Team	Time
1	Rohan Dennis (AUS)	BMC Racing Team	18h 09' 37"
2	Taylor Phinney (USA)	BMC Racing Team	+ 16"
3	Tony Martin (GER)	Etixx–Quick-Step	+ 24"
4	Peter Sagan (SVK)	Tinkoff	+ 27"
5	Niki Terpstra (NED)	Etixx–Quick-Step	+ 27"
6	Jos van Emden (NED)	LottoNL–Jumbo	+ 28"
7	Manuel Quinziato (ITA)	BMC Racing Team	+ 29"
8	Greg van Avermaet (BEL)	BMC Racing Team	+ 33"
9	Bob Jungels (LUX)	Etixx–Quick-Step	+ 36"
10	Wilco Kelderman (NED)	LottoNL–Jumbo	+ 38"

=== Stage 7 ===
24 September 2016 — Bornem to Geraardsbergen, 195 km (121.2 mi)

Stage 7 Result

	Rider	Team	Time
1	Edvald Boasson Hagen (NOR)	Team Dimension Data	4h 03' 27"
2	Niki Terpstra (NED)	Etixx–Quick-Step	+ 2"
3	Oliver Naesen (BEL)	IAM Cycling	+ 2"
4	Tom Dumoulin (NED)	Team Giant–Alpecin	+ 43"
5	Greg van Avermaet (BEL)	BMC Racing Team	+ 43"
6	Peter Sagan (SVK)	Tinkoff	+ 47"
7	Wilco Kelderman (NED)	LottoNL–Jumbo	+ 47"
8	Jos van Emden (NED)	LottoNL–Jumbo	+ 49"
9	Jon Izagirre (ESP)	Movistar Team	+ 49"
10	Dmitriy Gruzdev (KAZ)	Astana	+ 49"

Final general classification

	Rider	Team	Time
1	Niki Terpstra (NED)	Etixx–Quick-Step	22h 43' 26"
2	Oliver Naesen (BEL)	IAM Cycling	+ 31"
3	Peter Sagan (SVK)	Tinkoff	+ 1' 00"
4	Greg van Avermaet (BEL)	BMC Racing Team	+ 1' 02"
5	Jos van Emden (NED)	LottoNL–Jumbo	+ 1' 03"
6	Wilco Kelderman (NED)	LottoNL–Jumbo	+ 1' 11"
7	Zdenek Stybar (CZE)	Etixx–Quick-Step	+ 1' 15"
8	Jon Izagirre (ESP)	Movistar Team	+ 1' 19"
9	Tom Dumoulin (NED)	Team Giant–Alpecin	+ 1' 22"
10	Bob Jungels (LUX)	Etixx–Quick-Step	+ 1' 31"

== Classification leadership table ==
There are four principal classifications in the race. The first of these is the general classification, calculated by adding up the time each rider took to ride each stage. Time bonuses are applied for winning stages (10, 6 and 4 seconds to the first three riders) and for the three "golden kilometre" sprints on each stage. At each of these sprints, the first three riders are given 3-, 2- and 1-second bonuses respectively. The rider with the lowest cumulative time is the winner of the general classification. The rider leading the classification wins a white jersey.

There is also a points classification. On each road stage the riders are awarded points for finishing in the top 10 places, with other points awarded for intermediate sprints. The rider with the most accumulated points is the leader of the classification and wins the red jersey. The combativity classification is based solely on points won at the intermediate sprints; the leading rider wins the green jersey. The final classification is a team classification: on each stage the times of the best three riders on each team are added up. The team with the lowest cumulative time over the seven stages wins the team classification.

Stage	Winner	General classification	Points classification	Combativity classification	Team classification
1	Dylan Groenewegen	Dylan Groenewegen	Dylan Groenewegen	Bert van Lerberghe	Etixx–Quick-Step
2	Rohan Dennis	Rohan Dennis	Peter Sagan	Bert van Lerberghe	LottoNL–Jumbo
3	Peter Sagan	Rohan Dennis	Peter Sagan	Bert van Lerberghe	LottoNL–Jumbo
4	Peter Sagan	Peter Sagan	Peter Sagan	Bert van Lerberghe	LottoNL–Jumbo
5	BMC Racing Team	Rohan Dennis	Peter Sagan	Bert van Lerberghe	BMC Racing Team
6	Luka Pibernik	Rohan Dennis	Peter Sagan	Bert van Lerberghe	BMC Racing Team
7	Edvald Boasson Hagen	Niki Terpstra	Peter Sagan	Bert van Lerberghe	Etixx–Quick-Step
Final		Niki Terpstra	Peter Sagan	Bert van Lerberghe	Etixx–Quick-Step

- In stage five, Dylan Groenewegen, who was second in the points classification, wore the red jersey, because first-placed Peter Sagan wore the white jersey as leader of the general classification.
