= 2010 Hel van het Mergelland =

Race details
- Dates: 3 April 2010
- Stages: 1
- Distance: 195 km (121.2 mi)
- Winning time: 5h 09' 07"

Results
	Winner	Yann Huguet (FRA)
	Second	Jos van Emden (NED)
	Third	Dominic Klemme (GER)

The 2010 Hel van het Mergelland was the 37th edition of the Volta Limburg Classic cycle race and was held on 3 April 2010. The race started and finished in Eijsden. The race was won by Yann Huguet.

== General classification ==
Final general classification

Rank	Rider	Time
1	Yann Huguet (FRA)	5h 09' 07"
2	Jos van Emden (NED)	+ 0"
3	Dominic Klemme (GER)	+ 9"
4	Simon Geschke (GER)	+ 9"
5	Koos Moerenhout (NED)	+ 9"
6	Federico Canuti (ITA)	+ 9"
7	Gert Dockx (BEL)	+ 9"
8	Albert Timmer (NED)	+ 9"
9	Preben Van Hecke (BEL)	+ 9"
10	Arnoud van Groen (NED)	+ 12"
