= Preben Van Hecke =

Belgian road bicycle racer

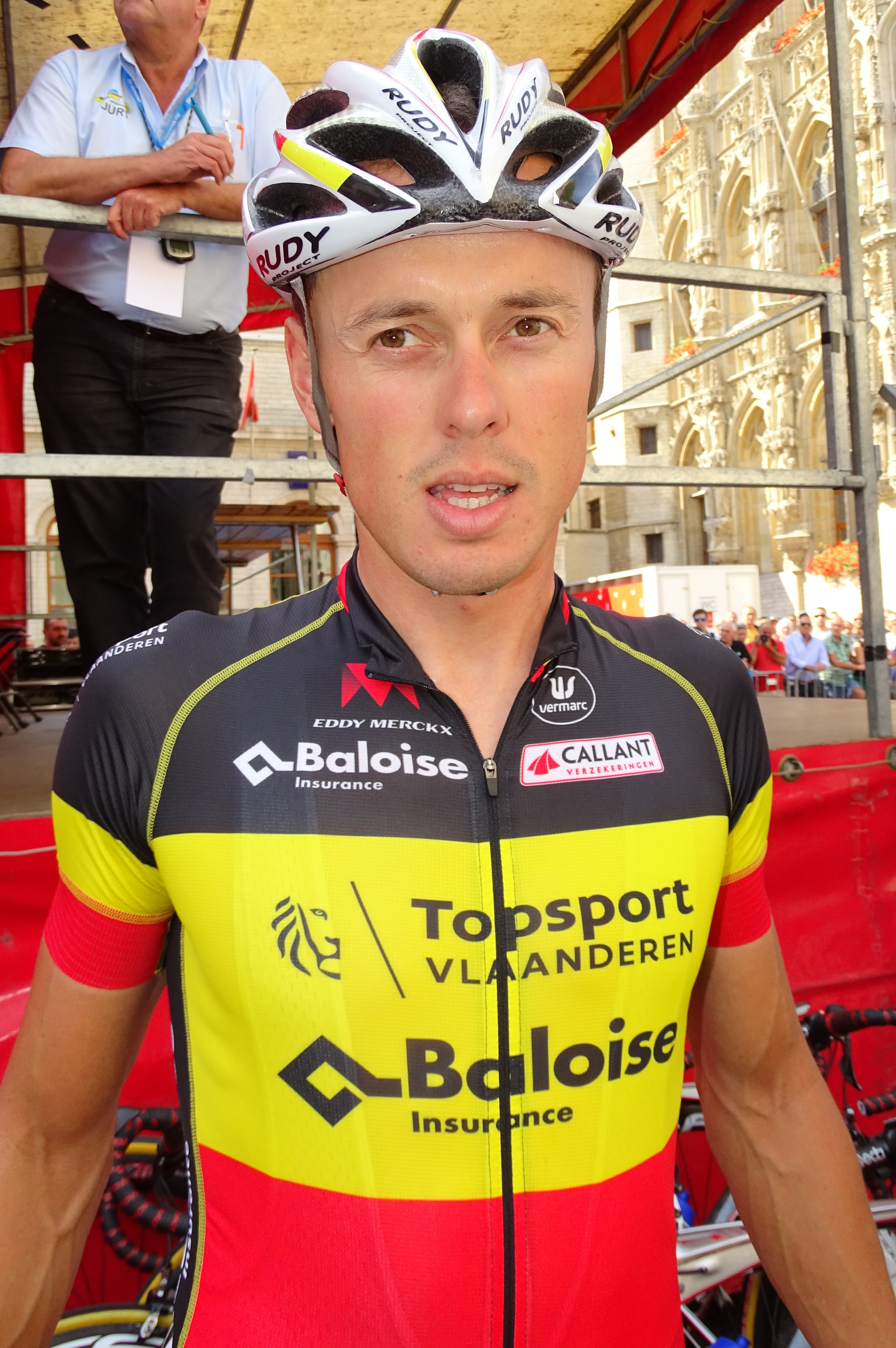
- Van Hecke in 2015

Personal information
- Full name: Preben Van Hecke
- Born: 9 July 1982 (age 44) Dendermonde, Belgium
- Height: 1.79 m (5 ft 10 in)
- Weight: 66 kg (146 lb)

Cycling career
- Sport: Cycling
- Current team: Alpecin–Premier Tech
- Discipline: Road
- Role: Rider (retired); Directeur sportif

Amateur team
- 2003: Quick-Step–Davitamon–Latexco

Professional teams
- 2004: Relax–Bodysol
- 2005–2007: Davitamon–Lotto
- 2008–2019: Topsport Vlaanderen

Managerial teams
- 2022: Minerva Cycling Team
- 2023–: Alpecin–Deceuninck

Major wins
- One-day races and Classics National Road Race Championships (2015)

Preben Van Hecke (born 9 July 1982) is a Belgian former professional road bicycle racer, who competed professionally between 2004 and 2019 for the Relax–Bodysol, Predictor–Lotto and Sport Vlaanderen–Baloise. He won the Belgian National Road Race Championships in 2015, out of a two-man breakaway with Jürgen Roelandts.

He now works as a directeur sportif for UCI WorldTeam Alpecin–Premier Tech.

== Major results ==
2002
6th Boucle de l'Artois
7th Flèche Ardennaise
2003
1st Omloop Het Volk U23
1st Circuit du Hainaut
1st Stage 6 Tour de Normandie
6th Zellik–Galmaarden
9th Flèche Ardennaise
2004
1st Noord Nederland Tour
Ster Elektrotoer

1st Mountains classification
1st Stage 2

7th Overall Tour de la Région Wallonne
2005
8th Overall Tour de l'Ain
2006
1st Schaal Sels
2nd Overall Étoile de Bessèges
6th Nationale Sluitingsprijs
9th Grand Prix Pino Cerami
2007
3rd Overall Étoile de Bessèges
4th Hel van het Mergelland
2008
2nd Grote Prijs Stad Zottegem
10th Grand Prix of Aargau Canton
10th Schaal Sels
2010
3rd Druivenkoers Overijse
9th Hel van het Mergelland
2012
1st Omloop van het Waasland
1st Mountains classification, Tour of Slovenia
2013
1st Antwerpse Havenpijl
1st Grand Prix de la Somme
2015
1st Road race, National Road Championships
3rd Dwars door de Vlaamse Ardennen
2016
7th Overall Arctic Race of Norway
2017
1st Mountains classification, Tour of Norway
7th Druivenkoers Overijse
8th Dorpenomloop Rucphen
2018
1st Mountains classification, Volta a la Comunitat Valenciana
3rd Ronde van Drenthe
3rd Great War Remembrance Race
