= 2004 Tour de la Région Wallonne =

Race details
- Dates: 26 July–30 July 2004
- Stages: 5
- Winning time: 20h 01' 00"

Results
	Winner	Gerben Löwik (NED)
	Second	Bert De Waele (BEL)
	Third	Christophe Agnolutto (FRA)

The 2004 Tour de la Région Wallonne was the 31st edition of the Tour de Wallonie cycle race and was held from 26 July to 30 July 2004. The race started in Aubel and finished in Charleroi. The race was won by Gerben Löwik.

== General classification ==
Final general classification

Rank	Rider	Time
1	Gerben Löwik (NED)	20h 01' 00"
2	Bert De Waele (BEL)	+ 1"
3	Christophe Agnolutto (FRA)	+ 5"
4	Sven Vanthourenhout (BEL)	+ 8"
5	Paul Van Hyfte (BEL)	s.t.
6	Maxime Monfort (BEL)	s.t.
7	Preben Van Hecke (BEL)	s.t.
8	Nicolas Reynaud (FRA)	+ 25"
9	Benoît Joachim (LUX)	+ 31"
10	Nicolas Inaudi (FRA)	+ 45"
