= Jos van Emden =

Dutch road bicycle racer (born 1985)

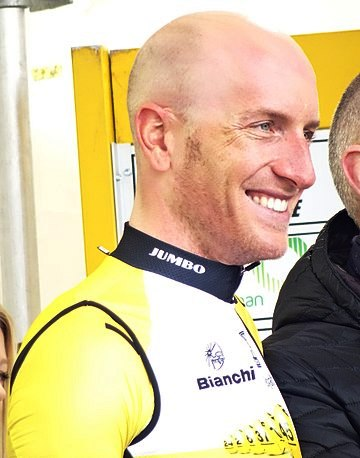
- Van Emden at the 2015 Kuurne–Brussels–Kuurne

Personal information
- Born: 18 February 1985 (age 41) Schiedam, the Netherlands
- Height: 1.86 m (6 ft 1 in)
- Weight: 74 kg (163 lb)

Cycling career
- Sport: Cycling
- Current team: Visma–Lease a Bike
- Discipline: Road
- Role: Rider (retired); Directeur sportif
- Rider type: Time trialist

Amateur team
- 2004: Wilton Snel Cycling Team

Professional teams
- 2005: Trientalis–Apac Team
- 2006–2008: Rabobank Continental Team
- 2008–2023: Rabobank

Managerial team
- 2024–: Visma–Lease a Bike

Major wins
- Grand Tours Giro d'Italia 1 individual stage (2017) One-day races and Classics National Time Trial Championships (2010, 2019, 2023) Dwars door West-Vlaanderen (2017)
Medal record
Men's road bicycle racing
Representing the Netherlands
World Championships
| Gold medal – first place | 2019 Yorkshire | Mixed team relay |
| Silver medal – second place | 2021 Flanders | Mixed team relay |
European Championships
| Bronze medal – third place | 2021 Trentino | Mixed team relay |

Jos van Emden (born 18 February 1985) is a Dutch former professional road bicycle racer, who rode professionally between 2005 and 2023 for the Trientalis–Apac Team, the Rabobank Continental Team and Team Jumbo–Visma.

During his career, Van Emden's specialty was in individual time trials, with 11 of his 14 professional victories coming in the discipline – including 3 victories in the Dutch National Time Trial Championships and a stage win at the 2017 Giro d'Italia. He was also part of the Dutch team that won the inaugural World Championships mixed team relay event, held in Yorkshire in 2019.

Following his retirement at the end of the 2023 season, Van Emden became a directeur sportif with UCI Women's WorldTeam Visma–Lease a Bike.

== Career ==
Born in Schiedam, Van Emden started racing at UCI level in 2005 with the Trientalis–Apac Team. During his second year, he took eight victories in his first season with the Rabobank Continental Team – two overall stage race victories along with stage wins across five races – and finished seventh in the under-23 road race at the 2006 UCI Road World Championships. The next year, he achieved his first professional victory when he won the Münsterland Giro. After three further victories in 2008, Van Emden was promoted to the main Rabobank team before the end of the season.

His debut in a Grand Tour came in 2009, when he took part in the Giro d'Italia. One year later, he finished ninth in two different stages of that same race, and achieved two time-trial victories in one week, winning the prologues of the Delta Tour Zeeland and the Ster Elektrotoer. Later that year, he was the winner of the Dutch National Time Trial Championships. He repeated his prologue victory at the Delta Tour Zeeland in 2011, and he also finished in fifth place overall at UCI World Tour race, the Eneco Tour. Van Emden's next victory came at the 2013 Münsterland Giro, joining Marcel Kittel as a two-time winner of the race, having broken clear from a lead group in the closing kilometres.

Van Emden made international headlines when he proposed to his girlfriend during the second time trial stage of the 2014 Giro d'Italia. After she accepted, he finished the stage 120th out of 156 starters. His best results during the 2014 season were third-place finishes in the Dutch National Time Trial Championships and the Arnhem–Veenendaal Classic. In 2015, Van Emden finished second in the time trial stage of the Tour of California, sitting in the leader's hot seat all day before being beaten by Peter Sagan. Two months later, Van Emden participated in his first Tour de France; he finished fifth in the opening time trial that took place in his home country. His biggest victory at that time came when he won the time trial stage of the Eneco Tour, subsequently gaining the right to wear the leader's jersey.

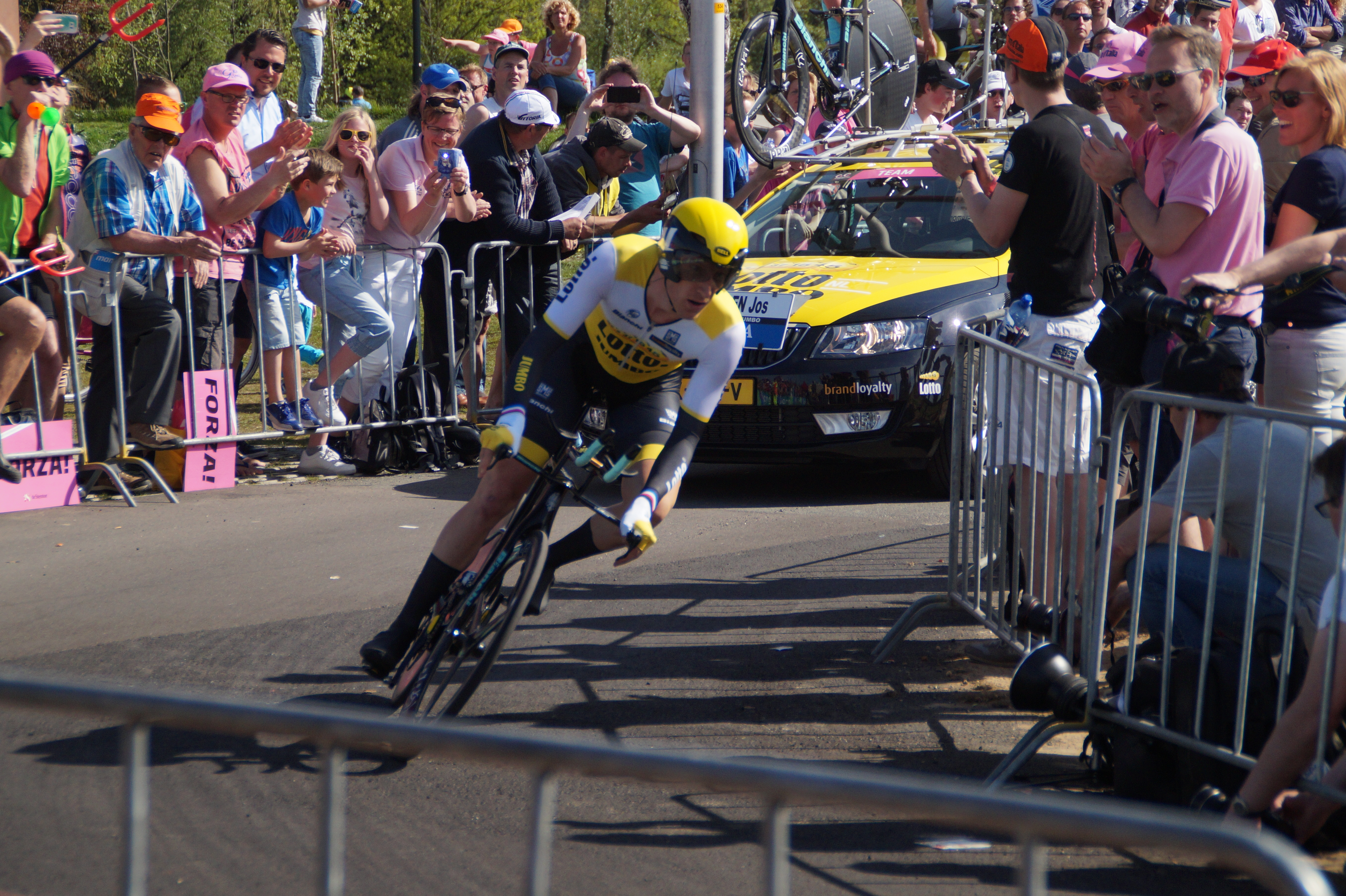
Van Emden at the 2016 Giro d'Italia

In 2016, Van Emden again won the opening time trial stage of the now-renamed Ster ZLM Toer, ultimately finishing the race in third place overall. He finished second in the Dutch National Time Trial Championships, more than half a minute down on race winner Tom Dumoulin. After riding the Giro d'Italia in the spring, Van Emden made his first start at the Vuelta a España, but failed to finish the race. He finished the season with an eighth-place finish in the time trial at the UCI Road World Championships in Qatar.

In 2017, Van Emden beat Silvan Dillier to the line to win Dwars door West-Vlaanderen in March, before taking his first Grand Tour stage victory at the Giro d'Italia in May, winning the final 29.3-kilometre (18.2-mile) individual time trial stage between the Monza Circuit and Milan. Later in the season, he placed fifth in the time trial at the UEC European Road Championships in Denmark. The following year, he was part of the LottoNL–Jumbo squad that won the team time trial at the Tour of Britain, and he finished second in individual time trial stages at Tirreno–Adriatico and the Critérium du Dauphiné.

Van Emden took his third prologue victory at the again-renamed ZLM Tour in 2019, and the following week, he won the Dutch National Time Trial Championships for the second time. Later in the season, Van Emden was part of the Dutch team that won the inaugural World Championships mixed team relay event, held in Yorkshire, and finished the season with a victory in the Chrono des Nations. In 2021, Van Emden took further medals in the mixed team relay at both the World Championships (silver) and the European Championships (bronze), with his final professional victory coming with his third Dutch national time trial title in June 2023. In August 2023, Van Emden announced his retirement from the sport as of the end of the season, and became a directeur sportif with UCI Women's WorldTeam Visma–Lease a Bike.

== Major results ==
2006
1st Overall Roserittet DNV GP

1st Stage 1

1st Overall Triptyque des Barrages

1st Stage 2 (ITT)

Grand Prix Guillaume Tell

1st Prologue & Stage 1

1st Stage 1 Tour du Loir-et-Cher
3rd Overall Tour de Normandie

1st Stage 4

3rd Ronde van Overijssel
National Under-23 Road Championships

4th Time trial
5th Road race

4th Paris–Tours Espoirs
5th Omloop van het Waasland
6th Ronde van Noord-Holland
7th Road race, UCI Under-23 Road World Championships
8th Time trial, UEC European Under-23 Road Championships
2007
1st Münsterland Giro
1st Prologue (TTT) Tour Alsace
National Under-23 Road Championships

2nd Time trial
3rd Road race

2008
1st Stage 1 Rhône-Alpes Isère Tour
1st Stage 5 Vuelta Ciclista a León
5th Overall Olympia's Tour
5th Ronde van Drenthe
7th Overall Le Triptyque des Monts et Châteaux
7th Halle–Ingooigem
8th Overall Tour de Normandie

1st Stage 7

9th Overall Boucles de la Mayenne
2009
8th Kampioenschap van Vlaanderen
10th Overall Sachsen Tour
2010
1st Time trial, National Road Championships
1st Prologue Ster Elektrotoer
2nd Overall Delta Tour Zeeland

1st Young rider classification
1st Prologue

2nd Hel van het Mergelland
2011
1st Stadsprijs Geraardsbergen
3rd Overall Delta Tour Zeeland

1st Prologue

5th Overall Eneco Tour
2013
1st Münsterland Giro
4th Overall Tour of Hainan
2014
3rd Time trial, National Road Championships
3rd Arnhem–Veenendaal Classic
9th Overall Ster ZLM Toer
10th Paris–Tours
2015
1st Stage 4 (ITT) Eneco Tour
3rd Time trial, National Road Championships
6th Overall Tour du Poitou-Charentes
2016
2nd Time trial, National Road Championships
3rd Overall Ster ZLM Toer

1st Stage 1 (ITT)

5th Overall Eneco Tour
8th Time trial, UCI Road World Championships
2017
1st Dwars door West-Vlaanderen
1st Stage 21 (ITT) Giro d'Italia
4th Time trial, National Road Championships
5th Time trial, UEC European Road Championships
6th Overall Tour of Britain
8th Le Samyn
2018
1st Stage 5 (TTT) Tour of Britain
5th Time trial, National Road Championships
8th Time trial, UEC European Road Championships
10th Paris–Tours
2019
1st Mixed team relay, UCI Road World Championships
1st Time trial, National Road Championships
1st Chrono des Nations
1st Stage 1 (TTT) UAE Tour
3rd Binche–Chimay–Binche
8th Overall ZLM Tour

1st Prologue

8th Time trial, UEC European Road Championships
2020
5th Road race, National Road Championships
2021
2nd Mixed team relay, UCI Road World Championships
3rd Mixed team relay, UEC European Road Championships
2022
4th Time trial, National Road Championships
9th Time trial, UEC European Road Championships
2023
1st Time trial, National Road Championships

=== Grand Tour general classification results timeline ===
| Grand Tour | 2009 | 2010 | 2011 | 2012 | 2013 | 2014 | 2015 | 2016 | 2017 | 2018 | 2019 | 2020 | 2021 | 2022 |
|---|---|---|---|---|---|---|---|---|---|---|---|---|---|---|
| Giro d'Italia | 166 | 116 | 159 | — | — | 107 | — | 120 | 117 | 99 | 104 | DNF | DNF | 89 |
| Tour de France | — | — | — | — | — | — | 121 | — | DNF | — | — | — | — | — |
| / Vuelta a España | — | — | — | — | — | — | — | DNF | — | — | — | — | — | — |

=== Major championship results ===
| Event | | 2008 | 2009 | 2010 | 2011 | 2012 | 2013 | 2014 | 2015 | 2016 | 2017 | 2018 | 2019 | 2020 | 2021 | 2022 | 2023 |
|---|---|---|---|---|---|---|---|---|---|---|---|---|---|---|---|---|---|
| World Championships | Time trial | — | — | 36 | — | — | — | — | — | 8 | — | 19 | 21 | 21 | 12 | — | 36 |
| World Championships | Mixed team relay | Event did not exist | | | | | | | | | | | 1 | NH | 2 | — | 7 |
| World Championships | Road race | — | — | DNF | — | — | — | — | DNF | DNF | DNF | — | DNF | — | — | — | — |
| World Championships | Team time trial | Event did not exist | | | | — | 12 | — | 6 | 5 | 7 | 13 | Event did not exist | | | | |
| European Championships | Time trial | Event did not exist | | | | | | | | — | 5 | 8 | 8 | — | 11 | 9 | — |
| European Championships | Mixed team relay | Event did not exist | | | | | | | | | | | — | — | 3 | NH | 4 |
| National Championships | Time trial | 8 | 7 | 1 | 9 | — | 18 | 3 | 3 | 2 | 4 | 5 | 1 | NH | — | 4 | 1 |
| National Championships | Road race | 25 | — | 49 | 43 | — | DNF | DNF | 50 | 40 | 50 | 18 | 59 | 5 | — | 13 | 37 |

Legend
| — | Did not compete |
| DNF | Did not finish |
| NH | Not held |

Sporting positions
| Preceded by Stef Clement | Dutch National Time Trial Championships; Winner; 2010 | Succeeded by Stef Clement |
| Preceded by Dylan van Baarle | Dutch National Time Trial Championships; Winner; 2019 | Succeeded by Tom Dumoulin |
| Preceded by Bauke Mollema | Dutch National Time Trial Championships; Winner; 2023 | Succeeded by Daan Hoole |
