= Anastasiya Kolesava =

Belarusian cyclist

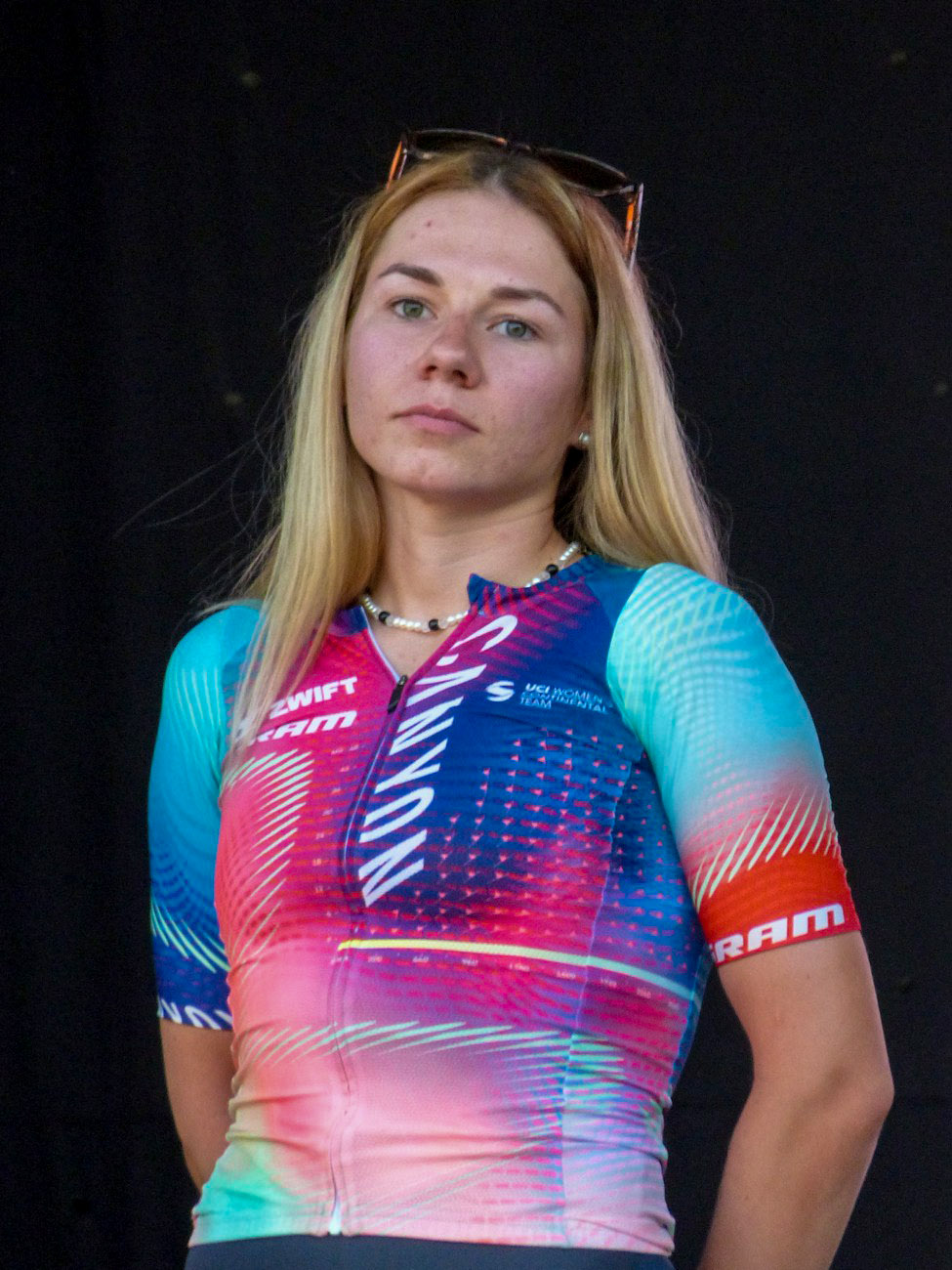
- Kolesava at TCFIA 2024.

Personal information
- Full name: Anastasiya Kolesava
- Born: 2 June 2000 (age 26)
- Height: 1.60 m (5 ft 3 in)

Cycling career
- Sport: Cycling
- Current team: Canyon//SRAM
- Discipline: Road
- Role: Rider

Professional teams
- 2019–2021: WCC Team
- 2022: Stade Rochelais Charente-Maritime
- 2023: Arkéa Pro Cycling Team
- 2024: Canyon–SRAM Generation
- 2025–: Canyon//SRAM Zondacrypto

Anastasiya Kolesava (born 2 June 2000) is a Belarusian professional racing cyclist, who currently rides for UCI Women's WorldTeam Canyon//SRAM. She rode in the women's road race at the 2019 UCI Road World Championships in Yorkshire, England.

== Major results ==
2017
National Junior Road Championships

1st Road race
2nd Time trial

2018
National Junior Road Championships

1st Road race
1st Time trial

2019
3rd Time trial, National Road Championships
2020
1st Time trial, National Under-23 Road Championships
2021
2nd Time trial, National Under-23 Road Championships
2nd Grand Prix Velo Manavgat
2022
9th La Périgord Ladies
2023
3rd Overall Giro della Toscana Int. Femminile – Memorial Michela Fanini

1st Stage 3

3rd Overall Tour Cycliste Féminin International de l'Ardèche
9th La Périgord Ladies
2024
2nd GP Lucien Van Impe

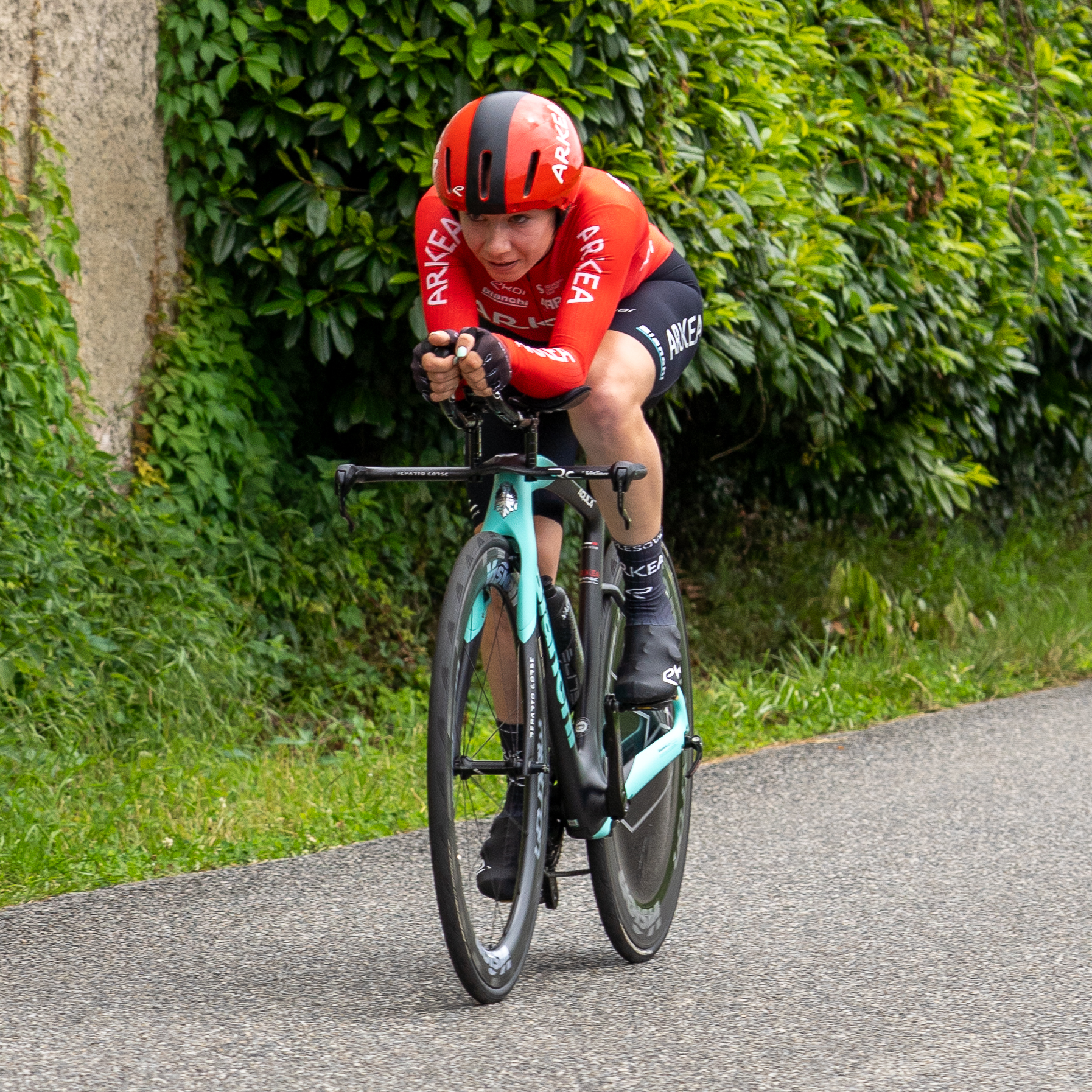
Kolesava, 2023 Tour de France Femmes time trial.
