= Koen Bouwman =

Dutch cyclist (born 1993)

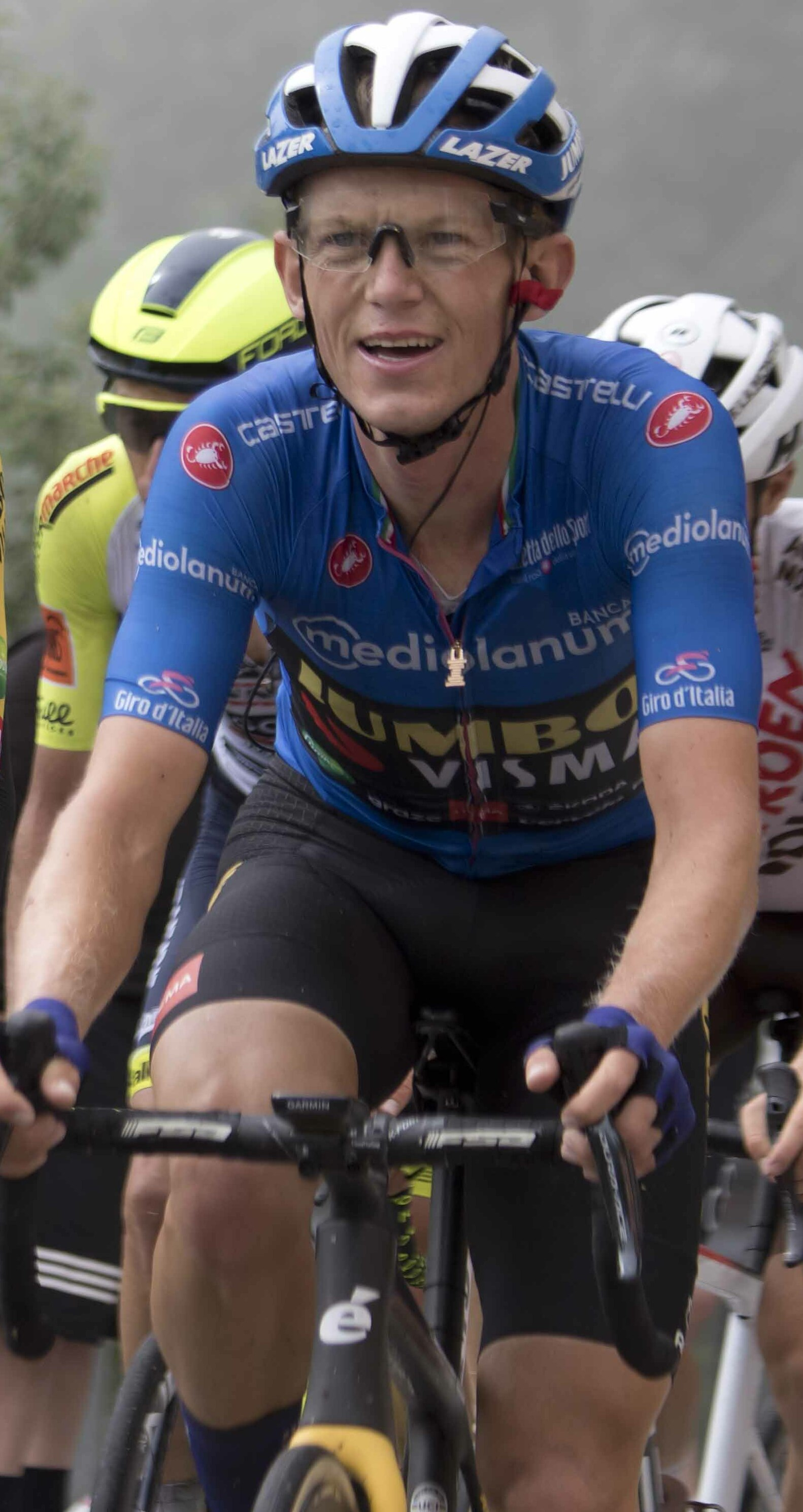
- Bouwman in 2022

Personal information
- Full name: Koen Bouwman
- Born: 2 December 1993 (age 32) Ulft, Netherlands
- Height: 1.78 m (5 ft 10 in)
- Weight: 60 kg (132 lb)

Cycling career
- Sport: Cycling
- Current team: Team Jayco–AlUla
- Disciplines: Road; Track
- Role: Rider
- Rider type: Climber

Amateur team
- 2012: Parkhotel Rooding Valkenburg

Professional teams
- 2013–2014: Cycling Team Jo Piels
- 2015: SEG Racing
- 2015: LottoNL–Jumbo (stagiaire)
- 2016–2024: LottoNL–Jumbo
- 2025–: Team Jayco–AlUla

Major wins
- Grand Tours Giro d'Italia Mountains classification (2022) 2 individual stages (2022)
Medal record
Men's road bicycle racing
Representing the Netherlands
World Championships
| Gold medal – first place | 2019 Yorkshire | Mixed team relay |
| Silver medal – second place | 2021 Flanders | Mixed team relay |
European Championships
| Gold medal – first place | 2019 Alkmaar | Mixed team relay |
| Bronze medal – third place | 2021 Trentino | Mixed team relay |

Koen Bouwman (born 2 December 1993 in Ulft) is a Dutch cyclist, who currently rides for UCI WorldTeam Team Jayco–AlUla.

== Career ==
Bouwman joined LottoNL–Jumbo in 2016 after riding for the team as a stagiaire the previous season. He competed in his first grand tour in 2016: the Vuelta a España. His first professional win was stage 3 of the 2017 Critérium du Dauphiné.

In May 2018, he competed in his first Giro d'Italia.

In 2019, Bouwman won the mixed team relay with the Dutch team at the UCI Road World Championships.

At the 2022 Giro d'Italia, Bouwman won two stages from the breakaway, giving him enough points to also win the mountains classification.

== Major results ==
=== Road ===
2014
4th Overall Carpathian Couriers Race
10th Volta Limburg Classic
2015
1st Stage 5 Giro della Valle d'Aosta
1st Mountains classification, Tour de Normandie
4th Time trial, National Under-23 Championships
6th Paris–Tours Espoirs
7th Overall Oberösterreich Rundfahrt
2017 (1 pro win)
Critérium du Dauphiné

1st Mountains classification
1st Stage 3

5th Time trial, National Championships
2018
1st Stage 5 (TTT) Tour of Britain
5th Overall Settimana Internazionale di Coppi e Bartali
9th Gran Premio Bruno Beghelli
2019
1st Team relay, UCI World Championships
1st Team relay, UEC European Championships
1st Stage 1 (TTT) UAE Tour
4th Time trial, National Championships
8th Overall Danmark Rundt
2020
7th Overall Czech Cycling Tour

1st Mountains classification

2021
2nd Team relay, UCI World Championships
3rd Team relay, UEC European Championships
3rd Time trial, National Championships
6th Overall Tour of Belgium
2022 (3)
Giro d'Italia

1st Mountains classification
1st Stages 7 & 19

3rd Overall Okolo Slovenska

1st Stage 3

2023
1st Stage 2 (TTT) Vuelta a Burgos
8th Overall Okolo Slovenska
8th Overall Tour de Luxembourg
2024 (2)
1st Overall Settimana Internazionale di Coppi e Bartali

1st Stage 3

2026
Vuelta a España

Held after Stages 2–3

==== Grand Tour general classification results timeline ====
| Grand Tour | 2016 | 2017 | 2018 | 2019 | 2020 | 2021 | 2022 | 2023 |
|---|---|---|---|---|---|---|---|---|
| Giro d'Italia | — | — | 50 | 41 | DNF | 12 | 21 | 25 |
| Tour de France | Has not contested during his career | | | | | | | |
| Vuelta a España | 123 | 41 | — | — | — | 42 | — | — |

Legend
| — | Did not compete |
| DNF | Did not finish |

=== Track ===
2018
2nd Individual pursuit, National Championships
2019
2nd Individual pursuit, National Championships
