= 2019 UCI Road World Championships =

Cycling world championships

- Location within North Yorkshire Location within the United Kingdom
- Venue: Harrogate, United Kingdom
- Date: 22–29 September 2019
- Coordinates: 53°59′30″N 1°32′15″W
- Events: 11

The 2019 UCI Road World Championships was the 92nd edition of the UCI Road World Championships, the annual world championships for road bicycle racing. It took place between 22 and 29 September 2019 in the historic county of Yorkshire, United Kingdom, the fourth to be held in the United Kingdom. The championships are traditionally hosted by a single town or city but, while each event in 2019 finished in the North Yorkshire town of Harrogate, the whole historic county of Yorkshire was the official host. Heavy rainfall caused some of the events to be re-routed and delayed.

Men and women were split into the categories of elite, under-23 (only men) and junior, competing individually in the two traditional road race and time trial disciplines of road bicycle racing. The 2019 championships saw the introduction of the mixed team relay, a team time trial which was raced together by the elite men and women. Mads Pedersen of Denmark won the men's elite road race and Annemiek van Vleuten of the Netherlands won the women's elite road race. The elite time trial titles were taken by Australian Rohan Dennis and American Chloé Dygert Owen.

== Race locations ==
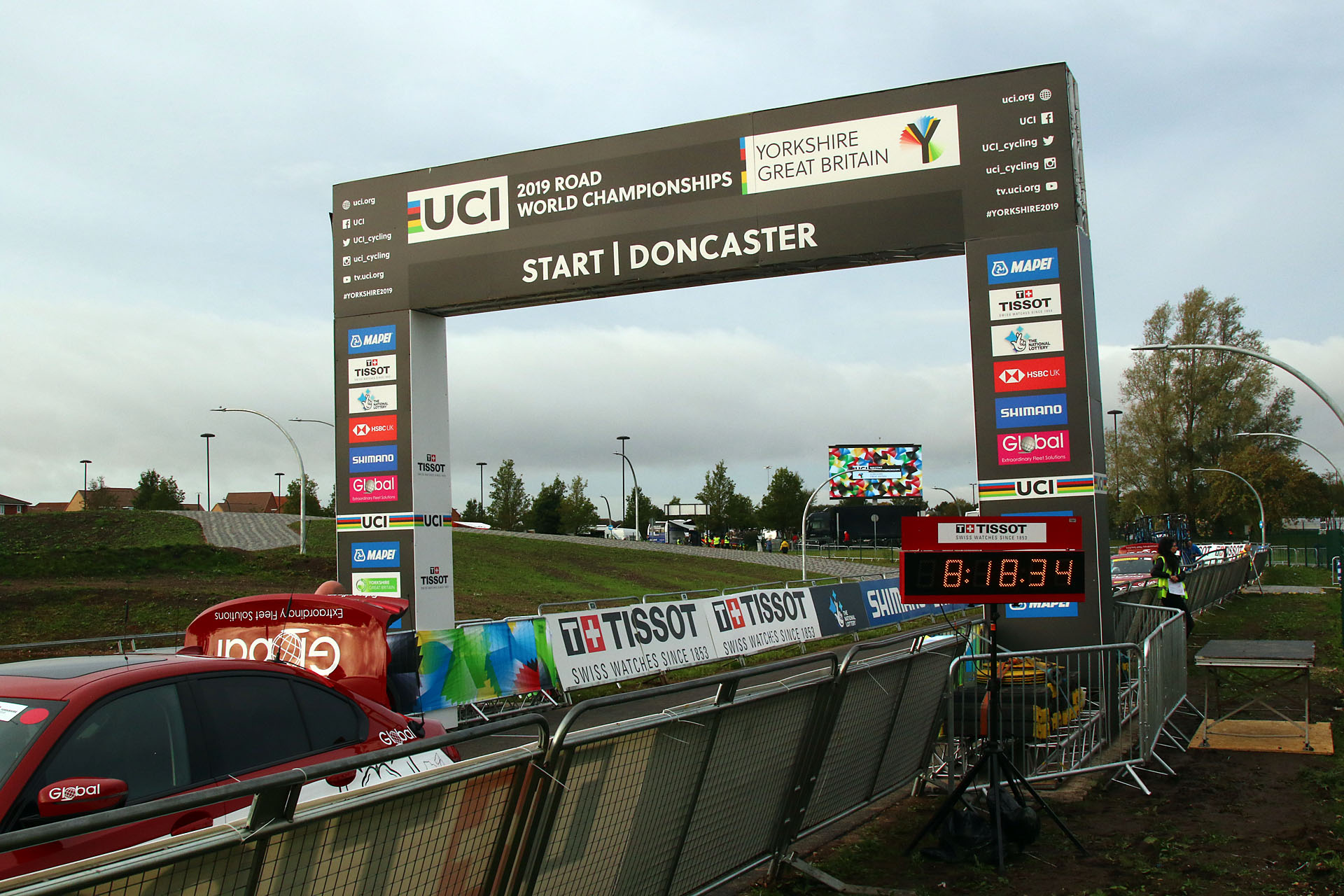
Starting point for the junior women's and under-23 men's road races in Doncaster

In July 2017, it was announced that Harrogate would host two circuit races and the other races were to start in locations across the historic county of Yorkshire, including Beverley, Doncaster, Leeds, Northallerton, Ripon and York.

At the 2018 UCI Road World Championships in September 2018, further details for the championships were announced. Harrogate would host the finishes for all eleven races during the eight days of racing, including the new-for-2019 mixed team time trial relay; three of these races will be contested entirely within a circuit of 14 kilometres (8.7 miles) in and around Harrogate. Ripon was announced to hold the start of two time trials, while the men's time trial will start in Northallerton. For the road races, Richmond was announced as the start location for the men's junior road race, while Doncaster would hold the start for the two remaining age-group races. The elite races were announced to be starting in Bradford (women) and Leeds (men) respectively.

The men's and women's elite road races followed separate routes before entering a 14 km (9 mi) circuit in and around the town of Harrogate. The men's elite road race integrated the route from stage one of the 2014 Tour de France for the first 185 kilometres (115 miles) before completing seven laps of the final circuit, for a total distance of 284.5 kilometres (176.8 miles). However, heavy rainfall necessitated last minute changes to the route of the men's elite road race, shortening the route to 260.7 kilometres (162.0 miles).

== Schedule ==
All times listed below were for the local time – British Summer Time or UTC+01:00.

Date	Timings		Event	Location (start)	Location (finish)	Distance	Laps (Note: Denotes the number of laps completed of the 14 km (8.7 mi) circuit in Harrogate.)
Mixed team relay
22 September	13:10	15:37	Mixed relay	Harrogate		27.6 km (17.1 mi)	2
Individual time trial events
23 September	10:10	11:42	Junior women	Harrogate		13.7 km (8.5 mi)	1
23 September	13:10	16:41	Junior men	Harrogate		27.6 km (17.1 mi)	2
24 September	10:10	12:29	Under-23 men	Ripon	Harrogate	30.3 km (18.8 mi)	1
24 September	14:40	16:48	Elite women	Ripon	Harrogate	30.3 km (18.8 mi)	1
25 September	13:10	15:48	Elite men	Northallerton	Harrogate	54 km (34 mi)	—N/a
Road race events
26 September	12:10	15:48	Junior men	Richmond	Harrogate	148.1 km (92.0 mi)	3
27 September	08:40	11:19	Junior women	Doncaster	Harrogate	86 km (53 mi)	—N/a
27 September	14:10	19:06	Under-23 men	Doncaster	Harrogate	171.6 km (106.6 mi)	2
28 September	11:40	15:47	Elite women	Bradford	Harrogate	149.4 km (92.8 mi)	3
29 September	09:10	15:35	Elite men	Leeds	Harrogate	260.7 km (162.0 mi) (Note: The race was initially scheduled to be contested over 280 km (170 mi) including seven laps of the Harrogate finish circuit. Due to flooding on the course, the race was reduced to 260.7 km (162.0 mi), although two additional laps of the finish circuit were added to the itinerary.)	9

== Race summaries ==
=== Elite men's road race ===
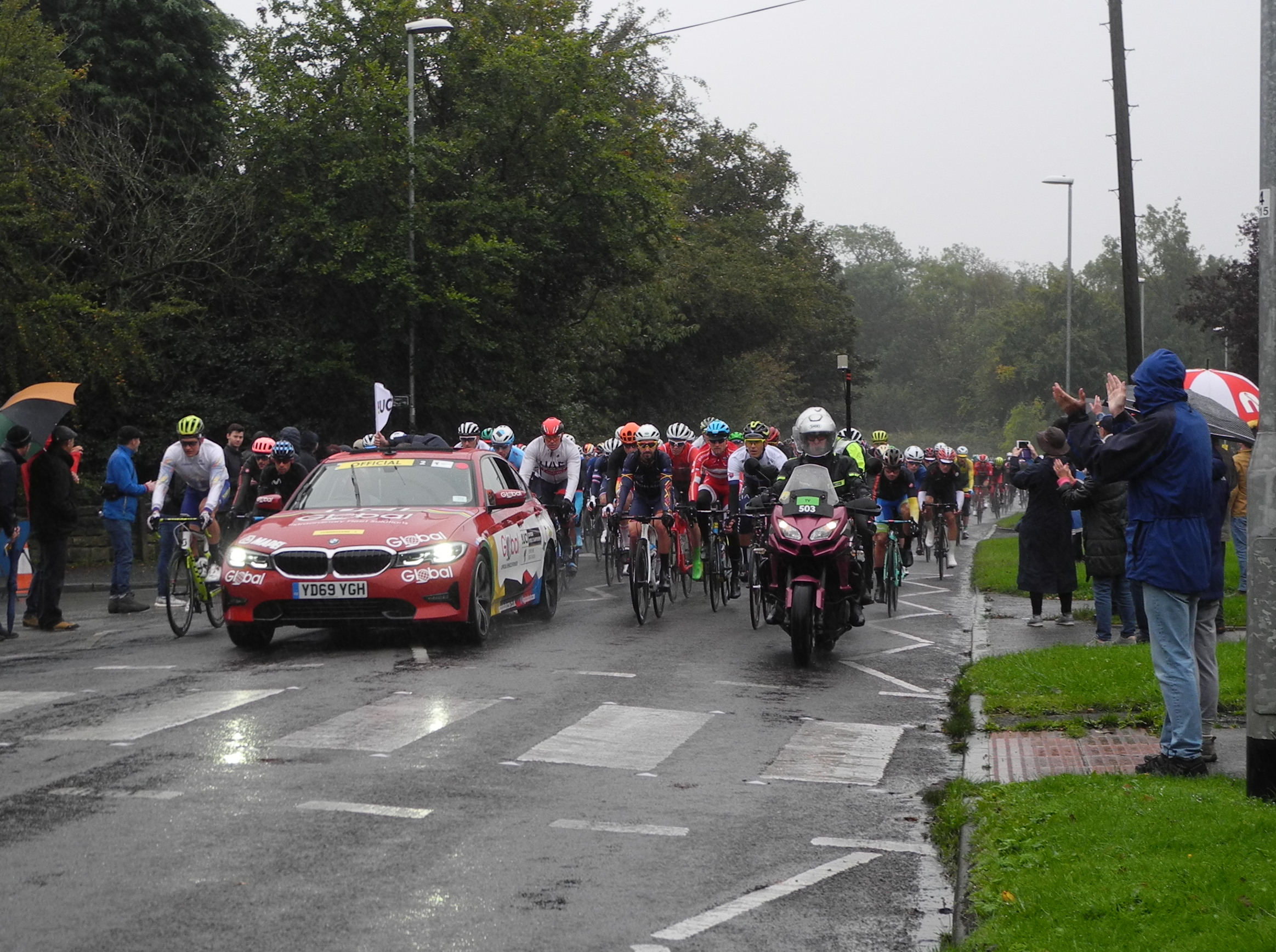
The start of the men's road race in Leeds

Mads Pedersen surprised in the men's road race by becoming the first Danish world champion in the event after winning the sprint in a three-man breakaway. Italy's Matteo Trentin started the sprint but took silver while Stefan Küng of Switzerland took bronze. One of the favourites, Mathieu van der Poel of the Netherlands, had also been in the breakaway but could not follow it on the last lap and finished over ten minutes behind. The day was marred by atrocious, torrential, downpours and bitterly cold, windy weather. This left four men where Italy's Gianni Moscon later lost contact; he finished in fourth place but was unable to help his teammate Trentin. Three-time champion Peter Sagan of Slovakia made a late breakaway from a larger chase group but could not catch the leaders and came fifth, followed by Michael Valgren of Denmark.

=== Elite women's road race ===
Dutch cyclist Annemiek van Vleuten won the race, after a solo breakaway for more than 100 km (62 mi). Defending champion Anna van der Breggen, also of the Netherlands, finished as runner-up, with Australian cyclist Amanda Spratt finishing in third.

=== Elite time trials ===
The men's time trial was 54 km (34 mi). Defending champion Rohan Dennis of Australia won by more than a minute. The silver went to the 19-year-old Belgian Remco Evenepoel who skipped the under-23 event after winning both the road race and time trial for juniors in 2018. Italy's Filippo Ganna rounded out the podium.

The women's time trial was 30.3 km (18.8 mi). The American Chloé Dygert Owen won by 1 minute 32 seconds, the largest margin ever in a world championship time trial. Anna van der Breggen took silver. Two-time defending champion Annemiek van Vleuten, had to settle with bronze. Four days later she won the road race after riding solo for more than three times as long.

The new mixed team time trial relay was 27.6 km (17.1 mi) in total, one lap for three men and one for three women. The inaugural event was won by one of the favourites, the Dutch team, with the female trio of Lucinda Brand, Riejanne Markus, Amy Pieters, and the male triumvirate Koen Bouwman, Bauke Mollema and Jos van Emden. Germany and the host Great Britain took silver and bronze, 23 seconds and 51 seconds behind.

=== Under-23 events ===
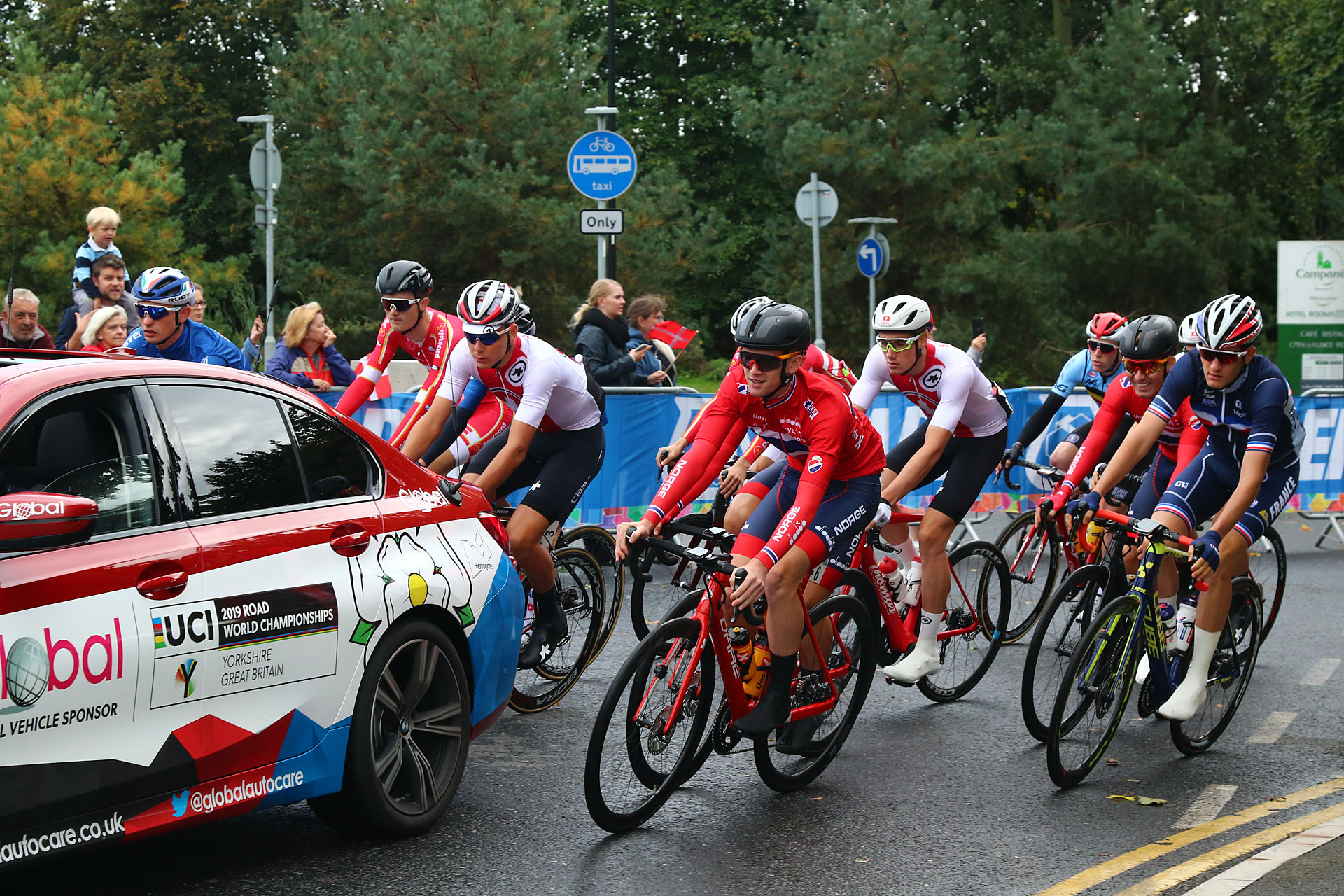
The start of the men's under-23 road race in Doncaster

As usual, there were only under-23 events for men. In the road race, Nils Eekhoff of the Netherlands won the sprint in a seven-man group but was later disqualified for drafting behind his team car for too long after a crash. The gold then went to Italy's Samuele Battistella. Stefan Bissegger of Switzerland was elevated to silver and Tom Pidcock got into the podium with a bronze for the British hosts.

The Danish favourite Mikkel Bjerg won his third consecutive gold in the under-23 time trial. The Americans Ian Garrison and Brandon McNulty took silver and bronze one second apart, but 27 seconds behind Bjerg who started as the last rider.

=== Junior events ===
Both junior road races were won by Americans. Quinn Simmons finished solo in the men's race while Megan Jastrab won a sprint for women. The victories contributed to the United States winning the most golds in the 2019 championships, three in total.

Antonio Tiberi of Italy won the junior time trial for men by 8 seconds. Russia's Aigul Gareeva won for women by four seconds.

== Events summary ==
=== Elite events ===
Event	Gold		Silver		Bronze	
Men's Events
Men's road race	Mads Pedersen (DEN)	6h 27' 28"	Matteo Trentin (ITA)	+ 0"	Stefan Küng (SUI)	+ 2"
Men's time trial	Rohan Dennis (AUS)	1h 05' 05.35"	Remco Evenepoel (BEL)	+ 1' 08.93"	Filippo Ganna (ITA)	+ 1' 55.00"
Women's Events
Women's road race	Annemiek van Vleuten (NED)	4h 06' 05"	Anna van der Breggen (NED)	+ 2' 15"	Amanda Spratt (AUS)	+ 2' 28"
Women's time trial	Chloé Dygert Owen (USA)	42' 11.57"	Anna van der Breggen (NED)	+ 1' 32.35"	Annemiek van Vleuten (NED)	+ 1' 52.66"
Mixed Event
Mixed relay	Netherlands	38' 27.60"	Germany	+ 22.75"	United Kingdom	+ 51.27"
Mixed relay	Lucinda Brand; Riejanne Markus; Amy Pieters; Koen Bouwman; Bauke Mollema; Jos van Emden	38' 27.60"	Lisa Brennauer; Lisa Klein; Mieke Kröger; Tony Martin; Nils Politt; Jasha Sütterlin	+ 22.75"	Lauren Dolan; Anna Henderson; Joscelin Lowden; John Archibald; Daniel Bigham; Harry Tanfield	+ 51.27"

=== Under-23 events ===
Event	Gold		Silver		Bronze	
Men's Under-23 Events
Men's under-23 road race	Samuele Battistella (ITA)	3h 53' 52"	Stefan Bissegger (SUI)	+ 0"	Tom Pidcock (GBR)	+ 0"
Men's under-23 time trial	Mikkel Bjerg (DEN)	40' 20.42"	Ian Garrison (USA)	+ 26.45"	Brandon McNulty (USA)	+ 27.69"

=== Junior events ===
Event	Gold		Silver		Bronze	
Men's Juniors Events
Men's junior road race	Quinn Simmons (USA)	3h 38' 04"	Alessio Martinelli (ITA)	+ 56"	Magnus Sheffield (USA)	+ 1' 33"
Men's junior time trial	Antonio Tiberi (ITA)	38' 28.25"	Enzo Leijnse (NED)	+ 7.79"	Marco Brenner (GER)	+ 12.62"
Women's Juniors Events
Women's junior road race	Megan Jastrab (USA)	2h 08' 00"	Julie de Wilde (BEL)	+ 0"	Lieke Nooijen (NED)	+ 0"
Women's junior time trial	Aigul Gareeva (RUS)	22' 16.23"	Shirin van Anrooij (NED)	+ 3.61"	Elynor Bäckstedt (GBR)	+ 10.93"

== Medal table ==
* Host nation (Great Britain)

Rank	Nation	Gold	Silver	Bronze	Total
1	United States (USA)	3	1	2	6
2	Netherlands (NED)	2	4	2	8
3	Italy (ITA)	2	2	1	5
4	Denmark (DEN)	2	0	0	2
5	Australia (AUS)	1	0	1	2
6	Russia (RUS)	1	0	0	1
7	Belgium (BEL)	0	2	0	2
8	Germany (GER)	0	1	1	2
8	Switzerland (SUI)	0	1	1	2
10	Great Britain (GBR)*	0	0	3	3
Totals (10 entries)		11	11	11	33

== Legacy ==
The legacy of the Worlds event has been reported with £15 million worth of funding to go towards the construction of 27 off-road racing venues around the country, "to ensure that every part of Britain has close access to a closed road circuit, velodrome, BMX track or mountain bike trail".

== See also ==
- Tour de Yorkshire
