= Joss Lowden =

British cyclist

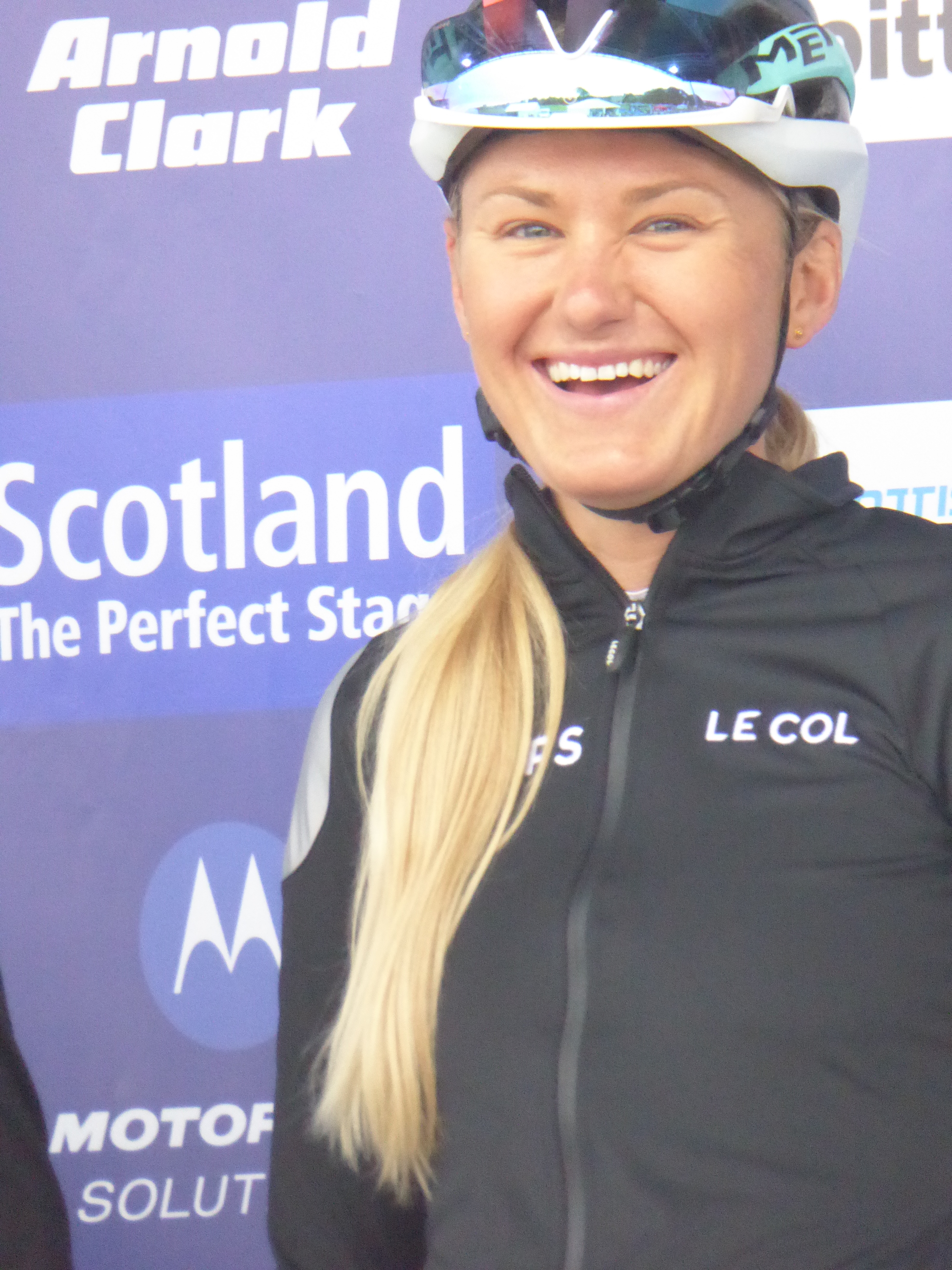
- Lowden at the 2019 Women's Tour of Scotland

Personal information
- Full name: Joscelin Kate Lowden
- Nickname: Joss
- Born: 3 October 1987 (age 39)

Cycling career
- Sport: Cycling
- Current team: Retired
- Discipline: Road
- Role: Rider

Amateur teams
- 2016–2017: Lewes Wanderers CC
- 2017: Aprire Bicycles/HSS Hire
- 2019: Independent Pedaler
- 2019: Brother UK/Fusion

Professional teams
- 2018: Storey Racing
- 2019–2021: Drops
- 2022–2024: Uno-X Pro Cycling Team
Medal record
Representing Great Britain
Women's road bicycle racing
World Championships
Bronze medal – third place	2019 Yorkshire	Mixed team relay

Joscelin Kate Lowden (born 3 October 1987) is a British former professional racing cyclist, who rode professionally between 2018 and 2024 for the Storey Racing, Drops–Le Col and Uno-X Mobility teams. During her professional career, Lowden took three victories – a stage and the general classification at the 2021 Tour de Feminin – O cenu Českého Švýcarska, and the 2022 British National Time Trial Championships. She also held the women's hour record from September 2021, until May 2022.

== Professional career ==
Having won the 2017 British National Hill Climb Championships, Lowden signed a contract with Storey Racing for the 2018 season. At the 2018 Women's Tour de Yorkshire, she was involved in an incident with a motorbike, suffering a fractured collarbone.

=== Drops (2019–2021) ===
Lowden joined the Drops team midway through the 2019 season, making her first race start at the Tour of California. She formed part of the British team for the inaugural mixed team relay at the UCI Road World Championships in Yorkshire, winning a bronze medal. The following year, Lowden only rode one professional race – riding the Setmana Ciclista Valenciana in February, prior to the COVID-19 pandemic which effected the remainder of the 2020 cycling season. In 2021, Lowden established herself as a team leader within Drops–Le Col by finishing eleventh overall at the Healthy Ageing Tour and fifth at Brabantse Pijl. Lowden took her first professional victory on Stage 4 of the Tour de Feminin – after launching a long range attack, she won the stage by over five minutes, earning the victory in the overall general classification. She also finished in eighth place in the time trial at the UCI Road World Championships in Belgium, and took two podium finishes at the British National Road Championships.

Away from the roads, Lowden set an unofficial hour record of 48.160 kilometres (29.925 miles) while in training in February, beating the existing record of 48.007 kilometres (29.830 miles) set by Vittoria Bussi. However, as it was not an official attempt, it did not qualify as a new record. It was later announced that Lowden would attempt an official assault on the record on 30 September at the Tissot Velodrome in Grenchen, Switzerland, and she ultimately set a new world record mark of 48.405 kilometres (30.077 miles) in one hour.

=== Uno-X Pro Cycling (2022–2024) ===
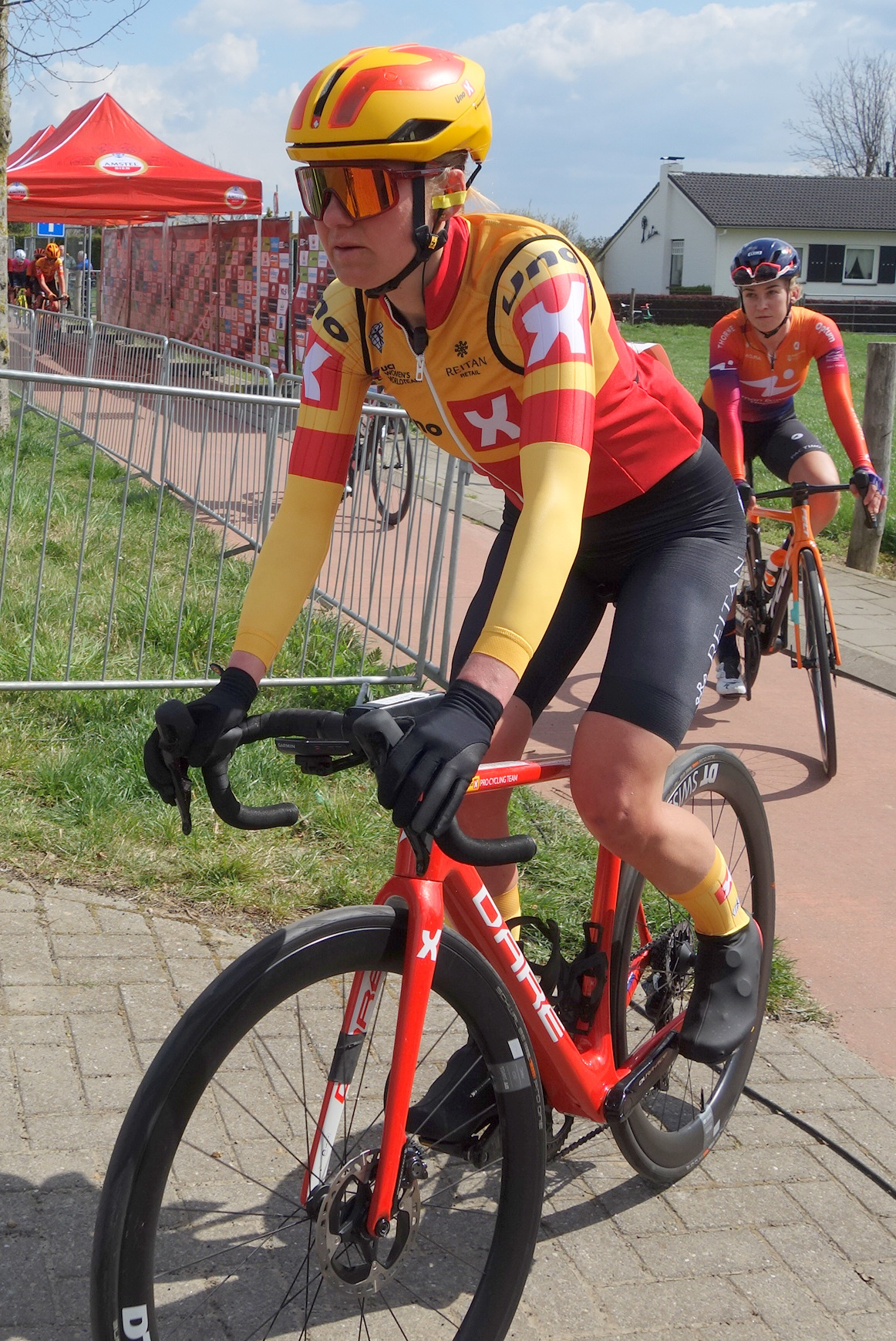
Lowden at the 2022 Amstel Gold Race

In August 2021, it was announced that Lowden had signed a two-year contract to join the newly formed Uno-X Pro Cycling Team from the 2022 season. She took her only road victory with the team when she won the 2022 British National Time Trial Championships in Dumfries by 23 seconds over her next closest competitor, Leah Dixon. She missed the 2023 season due to pregnancy, but was offered a contract extension for the 2024 season. She won the Graean Cymru gravel cycling race in September, before riding her final professional race the following month.

== Personal life ==
Lowden is married to fellow professional cyclist Daniel Bigham, and the couple have a son, born in 2023. Prior to her 2022 move to the Uno-X Pro Cycling Team, she combined her racing with working for NTT Data.

== Major results ==
2019
3rd Mixed team relay, UCI Road World Championships
2021
Hour record: 48.405 km
1st Overall Tour de Feminin – O cenu Českého Švýcarska

1st Mountains classification
1st Stage 4

National Road Championships

2nd Time trial
3rd Road race

5th Brabantse Pijl
8th UCI Road World Championships – Women's time trial
10th Overall The Women's Tour
2022
1st Time trial, National Road Championships
