= Simon Geschke =

German cyclist (born 1986)

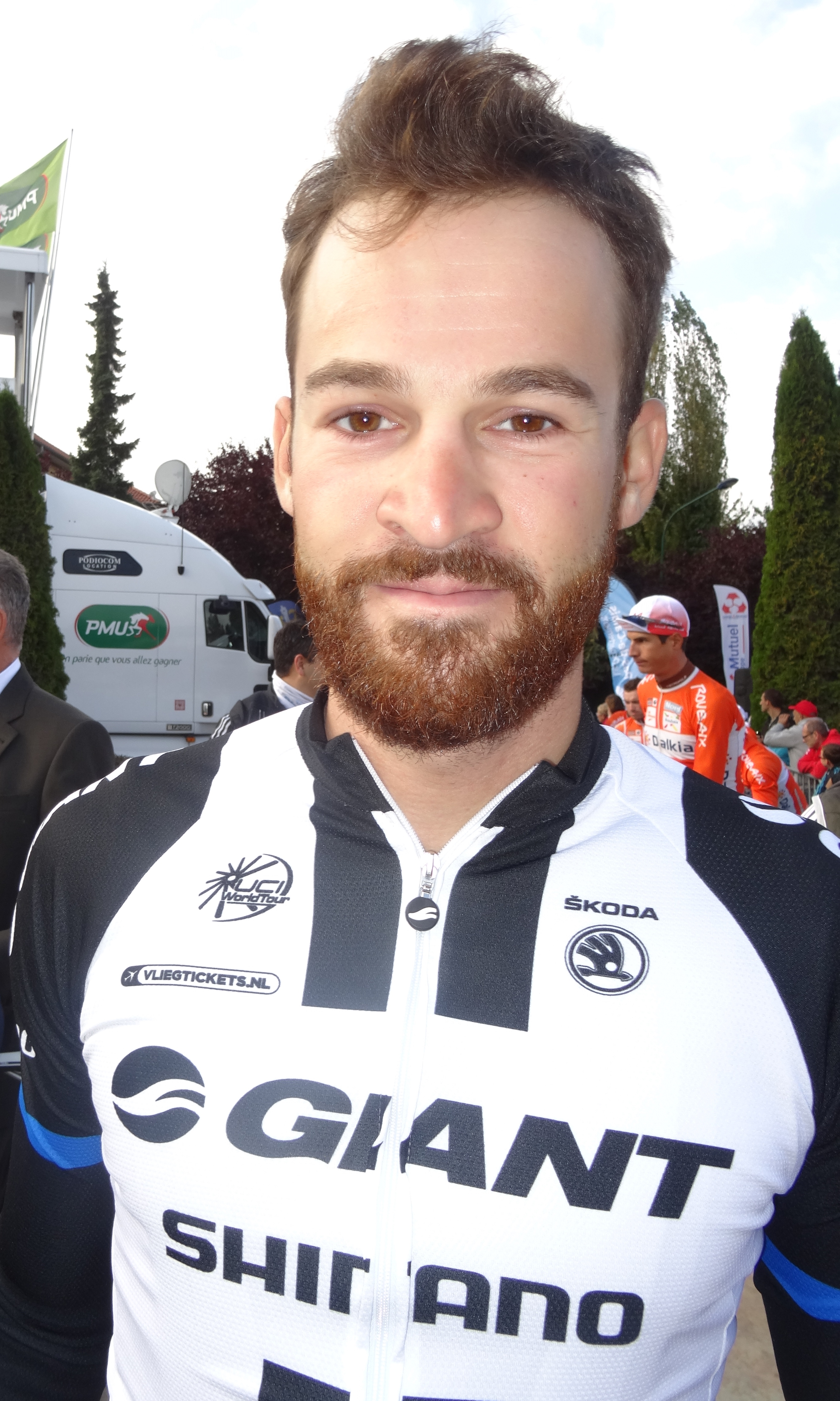
- Geschke at the 2014 Grand Prix d'Isbergues

Personal information
- Full name: Simon Geschke
- Born: 13 March 1986 (age 40) Berlin, Germany
- Height: 1.71 m (5 ft 7 1/2 in)
- Weight: 64 kg (141 lb; 10 st 1 lb)

Cycling career
- Sport: Cycling
- Discipline: Road
- Role: Rider
- Rider type: Climber

Amateur teams
- 2006: KED Bianchi Team Berlin
- 2008: Team Milram (stagiaire)

Professional teams
- 2009–2018: Skil–Shimano
- 2019–2020: CCC Team
- 2021–2024: Cofidis

Major wins
- Grand Tours Tour de France 1 individual stage (2015) One-day races and Classics Grand Prix of Aargau Canton (2014)

Simon Geschke (born 13 March 1986) is a German former road cyclist, who competed as a professional from 2009 to 2024.

== Career ==
In the 2015 Tour de France, Geschke won a mountain stage as he was part of the breakaway and soloed across the line in Pra-Loup.

=== Cofidis (2021–present) ===
In October 2020, Geschke signed with the Cofidis team as a mountain helper for team leader Guillaume Martin.

At the 2022 Tour de Romandie, Geschke initially rode in support of Ion Izagirre, but moved into overall contention, finishing as part of the lead group on the penultimate stage of the race in Zinal. He then finished second to Aleksandr Vlasov on the final stage, a 15.84-kilometre (9.84-mile) individual time trial from Aigle to Villars-sur-Ollon, moving up to third overall behind Vlasov and Gino Mäder. Prior to the Tour de France, Geschke finished third in the German National Road Race Championships. At his tenth Tour de France, Geschke wore a classification jersey at the race for the first time; after getting into the breakaway on stage 9, Geschke earned enough points to take the lead in the mountains classification, which was his goal for the stage. He also featured in the breakaways on stages 11, 14, and 16, before losing the jersey to Jonas Vingegaard after stage 17, after 9 days as mountains classification leader – a record for a German rider.

Following the end of the 2024 season, Geschke announced his retirement from the sport after 16 years, stating that “For me, the feeling is that the sport got less fun and there’s less fun between the riders”.

== Personal life ==
The son of former track cyclist Jürgen Geschke, Simon Geschke has been a vegan since 2016.

He announced the birth of a child on November 30, 2024

== Major results ==
2006
7th Overall Tour de Guadeloupe
9th Overall Cinturón a Mallorca
2007
7th Overall Ronde de l'Isard

1st Stage 1

2008
4th Overall Giro delle Regioni
6th Overall Grand Prix du Portugal
8th Overall Ronde de l'Isard
2009
9th Overall Bayern Rundfahrt
10th Eschborn–Frankfurt City Loop
2010
3rd Overall Tour de Seoul
4th Overall Bayern Rundfahrt
4th Hel van het Mergelland
6th Overall Circuit de Lorraine
10th Eschborn–Frankfurt City Loop
2011 (1 pro win)
1st Stage 2 Critérium International
4th Hel van het Mergelland
8th Eschborn–Frankfurt City Loop
10th Brabantse Pijl
2012
2nd Volta Limburg Classic
2013
5th Overall Bayern Rundfahrt
5th Brabantse Pijl
8th Roma Maxima
9th Grand Prix Cycliste de Québec
2014 (1)
1st Grand Prix of Aargau Canton
4th Brabantse Pijl
6th Amstel Gold Race
9th Roma Maxima
10th Strade Bianche
2015 (1)
1st RaboRonde Heerlen
Tour de France

1st Stage 17
Combativity award Stage 17

1st Sprints classification, Vuelta a Andalucía
Giro d'Italia

Held after Stages 9–10

2019
1st Mountains classification, Tour de Pologne
2020
3rd Overall Tour Down Under
5th Gran Piemonte
6th Overall Volta ao Algarve
10th La Flèche Wallonne
2021
7th Polynormande
2022
3rd Road race, National Road Championships
3rd Overall Tour de Romandie
10th Trofeo Pollença – Port d'Andratx
Tour de France

Held after Stages 9–17
Combativity award Stage 7

2023
7th Overall O Gran Camiño

=== General classification results timeline ===
Grand Tour general classification results
Grand Tour	2009	2010	2011	2012	2013	2014	2015	2016	2017	2018	2019	2020	2021	2022	2023	2024
Giro d'Italia	—	—	—	—	—	69	89	—	54	—	—	—	—	—	—	14
Tour de France	113	—	—	—	75	—	38	66	64	25	63	48	62	44	DNF	94
/ Vuelta a España	—	—	115	71	—	—	—	—	—	DNF	—	DNF	—	—	—	—
Major stage race general classification results
Race	2009	2010	2011	2012	2013	2014	2015	2016	2017	2018	2019	2020	2021	2022	2023	2024
Paris–Nice	—	51	—	71	—	—	—	23	53	—	—	—	24	DNF	49	—
Tirreno–Adriatico	—	—	—	—	39	35	DNF	—	—	DNF	—	—	—	—	—	60
Volta a Catalunya	—	—	—	—	—	—	—	—	—	—	DNF	NH	—	—	—	—
Tour of the Basque Country	—	—	—	—	DNF	64	—	DNF	DNF	—	—	NH	DNF	27	87	22
Tour de Romandie	—	—	—	—	—	—	—	—	—	76	—	NH	—	3	89	—
Critérium du Dauphiné	—	—	—	DNF	—	—	DNF	—	—	—	—	—	49	38	—	—
Tour de Suisse	—	—	—	—	37	—	—	32	—	40	41	—	—	—	53	—

Legend
—	Did not compete
DNF	Did not finish
DSQ	Disqualified
NH	Not held
