= 2021 UCI Road World Championships =

Cycling world championships

- Location within Belgium Location within Europe
- Venue: Flanders, Belgium
- Date: 19–26 September 2021
- Coordinates: 51°0′0″N 4°30′0″E
- Events: 11

The 2021 UCI Road World Championships was the 94th edition of the UCI Road World Championships, the annual world championships for road bicycle racing. It was held between 19 and 26 September 2021 in the Flanders region of Belgium. The region was chosen in light of the centenary of the world championships with the UCI opting for a return to one of the original founding countries.

== Schedule ==
Host cities in Flanders region of Belgium

All times listed below are for the local time – Central European Summer Time or UTC+02:00.

Date	Timings	Event	Location (start)	Location (finish)	Distance
Individual time trial events
19 September		Elite men	Knokke-Heist	Bruges	43.3 km (26.9 mi)
20 September		Men U23	Knokke-Heist	Bruges	30.3 km (18.8 mi)
20 September		Elite women	Knokke-Heist	Bruges	30.3 km (18.8 mi)
21 September		Junior women	Knokke-Heist	Bruges	19.3 km (12.0 mi)
21 September		Junior men	Knokke-Heist	Bruges	22.3 km (13.9 mi)
Mixed team relay
22 September		Mixed relay	Knokke-Heist	Bruges	44.5 km (27.7 mi)
Road race events
24 September		Junior men	Leuven	Leuven	119.4 km (74.2 mi)
24 September		Men U23	Antwerp	Leuven	162.6 km (101.0 mi)
25 September		Junior women	Leuven	Leuven	73.7 km (45.8 mi)
25 September		Elite women	Antwerp	Leuven	157.7 km (98.0 mi)
26 September		Elite men	Antwerp	Leuven	268.3 km (166.7 mi)

== Medal summary ==
=== Elite events ===
Event	Gold		Silver		Bronze	
Men's Events
Men's road race	Julian Alaphilippe; France	5h 56' 34"	Dylan van Baarle; Netherlands	+ 32"	Michael Valgren; Denmark	+ 32"
Men's time trial	Filippo Ganna; Italy	47' 47.83"	Wout van Aert; Belgium	+ 5.37"	Remco Evenepoel; Belgium	+ 43.34"
Women's Events
Women's road race	Elisa Balsamo; Italy	3h 52' 27"	Marianne Vos; Netherlands	+ 0"	Katarzyna Niewiadoma; Poland	+ 1"
Women's time trial	Ellen van Dijk; Netherlands	36' 05.28"	Marlen Reusser; Switzerland	+ 10.29"	Annemiek van Vleuten; Netherlands	+ 24.02"
Mixed Event
Mixed relay	Germany; Lisa Brennauer; Lisa Klein; Mieke Kröger; Nikias Arndt; Tony Martin; Max Walscheid	50' 49.10"	Netherlands; Annemiek van Vleuten; Ellen van Dijk; Riejanne Markus; Koen Bouwman; Bauke Mollema; Jos van Emden	+ 12.79"	Italy; Marta Cavalli; Elena Cecchini; Elisa Longo Borghini; Edoardo Affini; Filippo Ganna; Matteo Sobrero	+ 37.74"

=== Under-23 events ===
Event	Gold		Silver		Bronze	
Men's Under-23 Events
Men's under-23 road race	Filippo Baroncini; Italy	3h 37' 36"	Biniam Girmay; Eritrea	+ 2"	Olav Kooij; Netherlands	+ 2"
Men's under-23 time trial	Johan Price-Pejtersen; Denmark	34' 29.75"	Luke Plapp; Australia	+ 10.24"	Florian Vermeersch; Belgium	+ 11.39"

=== Junior events ===
Event	Gold		Silver		Bronze	
Men's Juniors Events
Men's junior road race	Per Strand Hagenes; Norway	2h 43' 48"	Romain Grégoire; France	+ 19"	Madis Mihkels; Estonia	+ 24"
Men's junior time trial	Gustav Wang; Denmark	25' 37.42"	Josh Tarling; Great Britain	+ 20.20"	Alec Segaert; Belgium	+ 29.48"
Women's Juniors Events
Women's junior road race	Zoe Bäckstedt; Great Britain	1h 55' 33"	Kaia Schmid; United States	+ 0"	Linda Riedmann; Germany	+ 57"
Women's junior time trial	Alena Ivanchenko; Russia	25' 05.49"	Zoe Bäckstedt; Great Britain	+ 10.64"	Antonia Niedermaier; Germany	+ 25.32"

== Medal table ==
* Host nation (Belgium)

Rank	Nation	Gold	Silver	Bronze	Total
1	Italy	3	0	1	4
2	Denmark	2	0	1	3
3	Netherlands	1	3	2	6
4	Great Britain	1	2	0	3
5	France	1	1	0	2
6	Germany	1	0	2	3
7	Norway	1	0	0	1
7	Russia	1	0	0	1
9	Belgium*	0	1	3	4
10	Australia	0	1	0	1
10	Eritrea	0	1	0	1
10	Switzerland	0	1	0	1
10	United States	0	1	0	1
14	Estonia	0	0	1	1
14	Poland	0	0	1	1
Totals (15 entries)		11	11	11	33
