= Lauren Dolan =

British cyclist

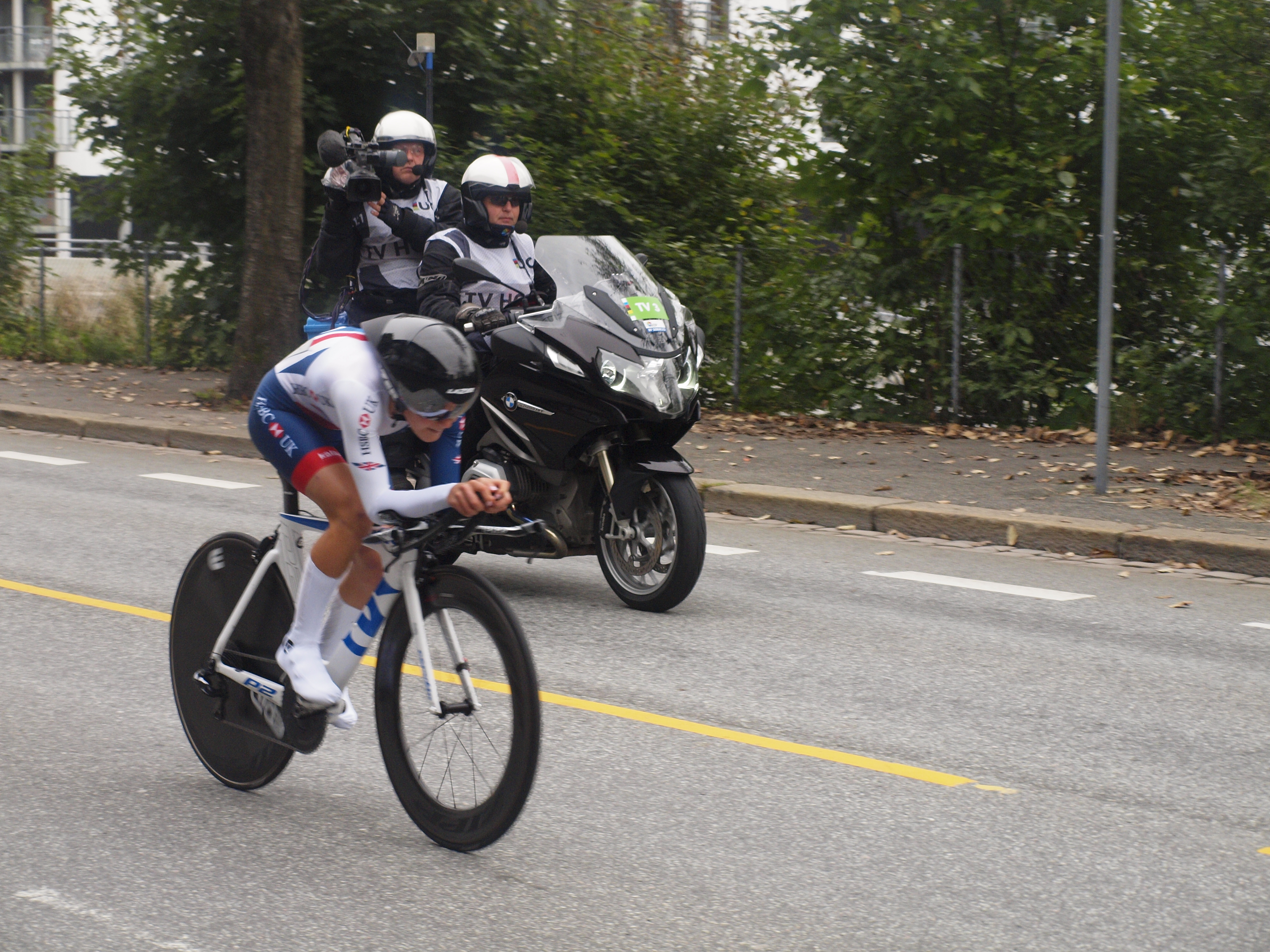
- Dolan in 2017

Personal information
- Full name: Lauren Louise Dolan
- Born: 19 September 1999 (age 27) Exeter, Devon, England

Cycling career
- Sport: Cycling
- Current team: Retired
- Discipline: Road
- Role: Rider

Professional team
- 2019–2020: Bizkaia–Durango
Medal record
Representing Great Britain
Women's road bicycle racing
World Championships
Bronze medal – third place	2019 Yorkshire	Team time trial mixed relay

Lauren Louise Dolan (born 19 September 1999) is a British former professional racing cyclist, who most recently rode for UCI Women's Continental Team Bizkaia–Durango. In September 2017, Dolan crashed heavily during the junior time trial event at the 2017 UCI Road World Championships, but went on to finish the race. A motorist's actions in September 2019 caused her to sustain multiple serious injuries which ultimately ended her career.

== Major results ==
2019
3rd Mixed team relay, UCI Road World Championships
