= Jasha Sütterlin =

German cyclist (born 1992)

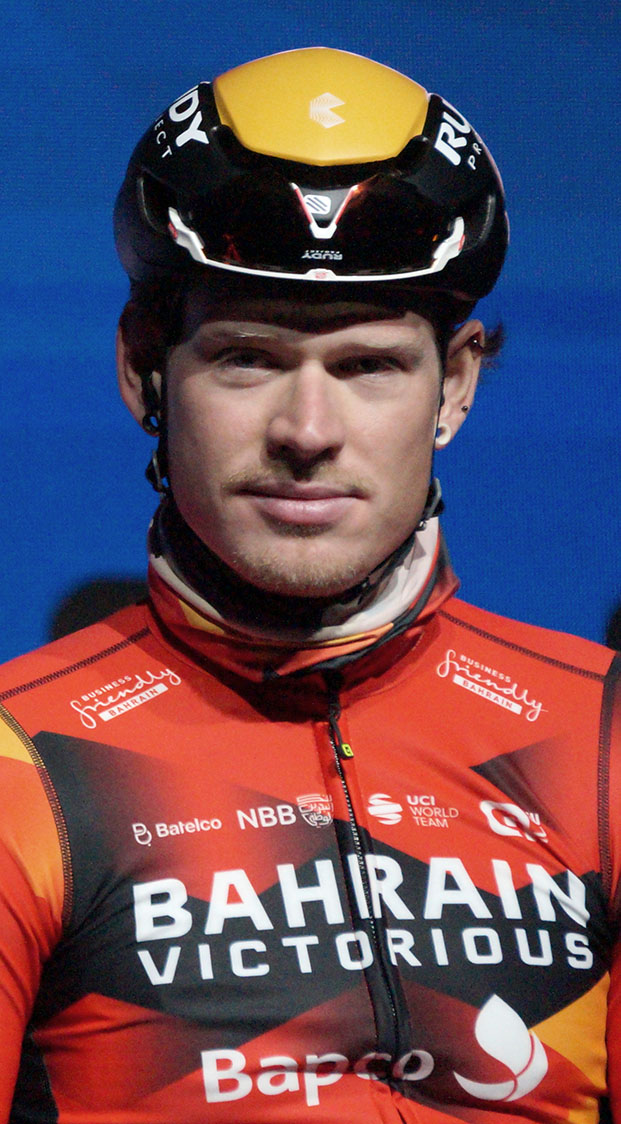
- Sütterlin in 2023

Personal information
- Full name: Jasha Sütterlin
- Born: 4 November 1992 (age 33) Freiburg im Breisgau, Germany
- Height: 1.84 m (6 ft 0 in)
- Weight: 78 kg (172 lb)

Cycling career
- Sport: Cycling
- Current team: Team Jayco–AlUla
- Discipline: Road
- Role: Rider
- Rider type: Rouleur

Professional teams
- 2011–2013: Thüringer Energie Team
- 2014–2019: Movistar Team
- 2020–2021: Team Sunweb
- 2022–2024: Team Bahrain Victorious
- 2025–: Team Jayco–AlUla
Medal record
Men's road bicycle racing
Representing Germany
World Championships
Silver medal – second place	2019 Yorkshire	Mixed team relay
European Championships
Silver medal – second place	2019 Alkmaar	Mixed team relay
Representing Movistar Team
World Championships
Bronze medal – third place	2015 Richmond	Team time trial

Jasha Sütterlin (born 4 November 1992 in Freiburg im Breisgau) is a German cyclist, who currently rides for UCI WorldTeam Team Jayco–AlUla. He was named in the start list for the 2016 Giro d'Italia, the 2017 Tour de France, and the 2020 Vuelta a España.

== Major results ==
2009
3rd Overall Regio-Tour Juniors
7th Overall Trofeo Karlsberg
2010
1st Time trial, National Junior Road Championships
1st Overall Niedersachsen–Rundfahrt Juniors
UCI Juniors Road World Championships

2nd Time trial
8th Road race

2nd Overall Giro della Lunigiana
3rd Overall Trofeo Karlsberg

1st Stage 4

4th Overall Regio-Tour Juniors
2011
1st Overall Tour de Berlin
4th Memorial Davide Fardelli
2012
1st Time trial, National Under-23 Road Championships
7th Overall Thüringen Rundfahrt der U23
8th Time trial, UCI Under-23 Road World Championships
2013
1st Time trial, National Under-23 Road Championships
Giro della Valle d'Aosta

1st Prologue & Stage 5

3rd Time trial, UEC European Under-23 Road Championships
3rd Overall Tour de Bretagne
2015
3rd Team time trial, UCI Road World Championships
10th Overall Bayern–Rundfahrt
2016
2nd Time trial, National Road Championships
2017
1st Stage 3 Vuelta a la Comunidad de Madrid
2nd Time trial, National Road Championships
10th Down Under Classic
2018
2nd Time trial, National Road Championships
6th Overall Tour of Britain
2019
2nd Team relay, UCI Road World Championships
2nd Team relay, UEC European Road Championships
3rd Time trial, National Road Championships
9th E3 Binckbank Classic
2020
5th Overall Okolo Slovenska
2026
3rd Time trial, National Road Championships

=== Grand Tour general classification results timeline ===
Grand Tour	2016	2017	2018	2019	2020	2021	2022	2023	2024
Giro d'Italia	113	—	—	120	—	—	87	75	57
Tour de France	—	108	—	—	—	DNF	—	—	
Vuelta a España	—	—	—	—	55	—	—	71	

Legend
—	Did not compete
DNF	Did not finish
IP	Race in Progress
