= 2018 Ronde van Drenthe =

2018 UCI Europe Tour

Race details
- Dates: 11 March 2018
- Stages: 1
- Distance: 192 km (119 mi)
- Winning time: 4h 36' 28"

Results
	Winner	František Sisr (CZE)
	Second	Dries De Bondt (BEL)
	Third	Preben Van Hecke (BEL)

The 2018 Ronde van Drenthe was the 56th edition of the Ronde van Drenthe road cycling one day race. It was held on 11 March 2018 as part of the UCI Europe Tour in category 1.HC.

The race was won by František Sisr of CCC–Sprandi–Polkowice.

== Teams ==
Twenty-two teams of up to seven riders started the race:

UCI WorldTeam

- Lotto–Soudal

UCI Professional Continental teams

- Vérandas Willems–Crelan
- Aqua Blue Sport
- UnitedHealthcare
- CCC–Sprandi–Polkowice
- Vital Concept
- Cofidis
- Wanty–Groupe Gobert
- WB Aqua Protect Veranclassic
- Israel Cycling Academy
- Roompot–Nederlandse Loterij
- Alecto Cycling Team
- Sport Vlaanderen–Baloise
- Gazprom–RusVelo

UCI Continental teams

- BEAT Cycling Club
- Metec–TKH
- Monkey Town Continental Team
- Canyon Eisberg
- Delta Cycling Rotterdam
- Riwal CeramicSpeed
- Vlasman Cycling Team

National team

- Netherlands

== Result ==
Final general classification

Rank	Rider	Team	Time
1	František Sisr (CZE)	CCC–Sprandi–Polkowice	4h 36' 28"
2	Dries De Bondt (BEL)	Vérandas Willems–Crelan	s.t.
3	Preben Van Hecke (BEL)	Sport Vlaanderen–Baloise	s.t.
4	Zak Dempster (AUS)	Israel Cycling Academy	s.t.
5	Wesley Kreder (NED)	Wanty–Groupe Gobert	s.t.
6	Rick Ottema (NED)	Alecto Cycling Team	s.t.
7	Floris Gerts (NED)	Roompot–Nederlandse Loterij	s.t.
8	Joey van Rhee (NED)	Monkey Town Continental Team	+ 3"
9	Johan Le Bon (FRA)	Vital Concept	s.t.
10	Jasper Bovenhuis (NED)	Vlasman Cycling Team	s.t.
