= 2016 Tour of Britain =

2016 UCI Europe Tour
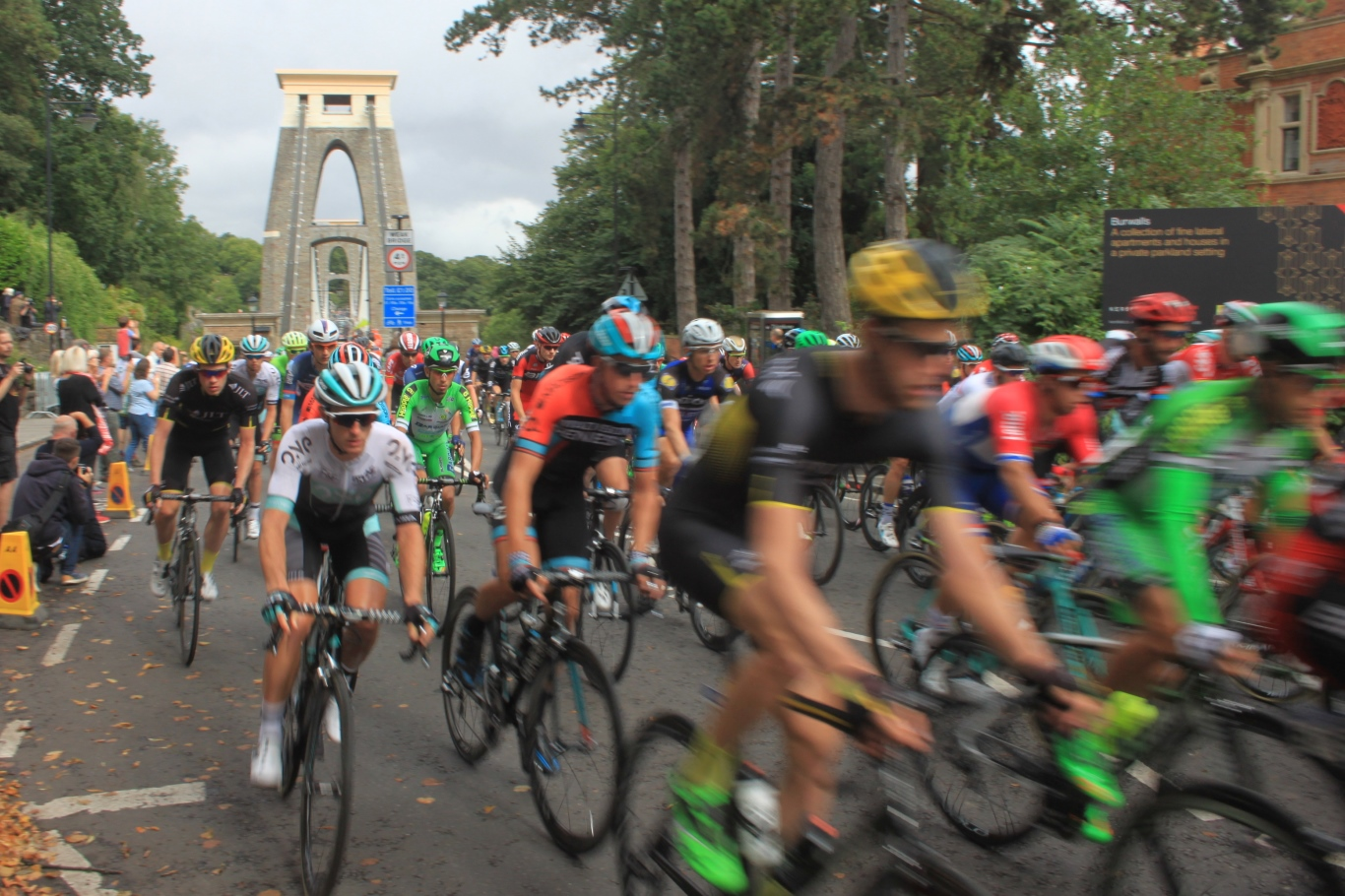
- Crossing Clifton Suspension Bridge during stage 7

Race details
- Dates: 4–11 September
- Stages: 8, including one split stage
- Distance: 1,295.6 km (805.0 mi)
- Winning time: 31h 30' 45"

Results
Jersey awarded to the overall winner	Winner	Steve Cummings (GBR)	(Team Dimension Data)
	Second	Rohan Dennis (AUS)	(BMC Racing Team)
	Third	Tom Dumoulin (NED)	(Team Giant–Alpecin)
Jersey awarded to the points classification winner	Points	Dylan Groenewegen (NED)	(LottoNL–Jumbo)
Jersey awarded to the mountains classification winner	Mountains	Xandro Meurisse (BEL)	(Wanty–Groupe Gobert)
Jersey awarded to the sprints classification winner	Sprints	Jasper Bovenhuis (NED)	(An Post–Chain Reaction)
	Team	Team Sky	

The 2016 Tour of Britain was a nine-stage men's professional road cycling race. It was the thirteenth running of the modern version of the Tour of Britain and the 76th British tour in total. The race started on 4 September in Glasgow and finished on 11 September in London. The race was part of the 2016 UCI Europe Tour.

Team Dimension Data rider Steve Cummings became the first British rider to win the Tour overall since Bradley Wiggins in 2013, as well as improving upon two previous runner-up finishes to win the race for the first time. Cummings finished second on the second stage in Cumbria, and assumed the race lead from Belgium's Julien Vermote (Etixx–Quick-Step) at the summit finish at Haytor, and maintained the yellow jersey over the final two days. Cummings eventually won the race by 26 seconds ahead of Australian rider Rohan Dennis of the BMC Racing Team – who won the circuit race in Bristol on the penultimate day – while the podium was completed by Tom Dumoulin from the Netherlands, riding for Team Giant–Alpecin, 12 seconds behinds Dennis and 38 seconds in arrears of Cummings.

In the race's other classifications, another Dutch rider Dylan Groenewegen (LottoNL–Jumbo) won the blue jersey for the points classification on the final stage, taking the lead from Dennis with a second-place finish to Caleb Ewan in London. Groenewegen also won a stage during the race, the longest stage of the Tour, into Builth Wells. Dutchman Jasper Bovenhuis won the green jersey for the sprints classification for An Post–Chain Reaction, having featured in breakaways on the first and last stages of the race. Xandro Meurisse from Belgium, riding for the Wanty–Groupe Gobert team as a stagiaire, won the black jersey for the mountains classification, as well as finishing seventh overall in the general classification. With two riders in the top ten overall – Nicolas Roche sixth and Ben Swift eighth – Team Sky won the teams classification, while Germany's André Greipel (Lotto–Soudal), who won the opening stage into Castle Douglas, was named as the Tour's most combative rider.

For the first time since 2006, no rider won more than one stage. As well as the victories recorded by Greipel, Vermote, Groenewegen, Dennis and Ewan; Team Sky pair Ian Stannard and Wout Poels, Cannondale–Drapac's Jack Bauer and Etixx–Quick-Step rider Tony Martin took stage wins.

== Teams ==
The twenty-one teams invited to participate in the Tour of Britain are:

UCI WorldTeams
- BMC Racing Team
- Cannondale–Drapac
- Etixx–Quick-Step
- Lotto–Soudal
- LottoNL–Jumbo
- Movistar Team
- Orica–BikeExchange
- Team Dimension Data
- Team Giant–Alpecin
- Team Sky
- Trek–Segafredo
UCI Professional Continental Teams
- Bardiani–CSF
- Caja Rural–Seguros RGA
- ONE Pro Cycling
- Wanty–Groupe Gobert
UCI Continental Teams
- An Post–Chain Reaction
- JLT–Condor
- Madison Genesis
- NFTO
- WIGGINS
National Teams
- Great Britain

== Schedule ==
The route for the race was announced in February 2016.

Stage characteristics and winners
Stage	Date	Course	Distance	Type	Winner	Ref
1	4 September	Glasgow to Castle Douglas	161.6 km (100 mi)	Hilly stage	André Greipel (GER)	
2	5 September	Carlisle to Kendal	188.2 km (117 mi)	Hilly stage	Julien Vermote (BEL)	
3	6 September	Congleton to Tatton Park	179.4 km (111 mi)	Hilly stage	Ian Stannard (GBR)	
4	7 September	Denbigh to Builth Wells	218 km (135 mi)	Hilly stage	Dylan Groenewegen (NED)	
5	8 September	Aberdare to Bath	194.5 km (121 mi)	Hilly stage	Jack Bauer (NZL)	
6	9 September	Sidmouth to Haytor	149.9 km (93 mi)	Hilly stage	Wout Poels (NED)	
7a	10 September	Bristol	14.2 km (9 mi)	Individual time trial	Tony Martin (GER)	
7b	10 September	Bristol	90.6 km (56 mi)	Flat stage	Rohan Dennis (AUS)	
8	11 September	London	99.2 km (62 mi)	Flat stage	Caleb Ewan (AUS)	
	Total		1,295.6 km (805 mi)			

== Stages ==
=== Stage 1 ===
4 September 2016 — Glasgow to Castle Douglas, 161.6 km (100 mi)

Stage 1 result

Rank	Rider	Team	Time
1	André Greipel (GER)	Lotto–Soudal	3h 52' 40"
2	Caleb Ewan (AUS)	Orica–BikeExchange	+ 0"
3	Ramon Sinkeldam (NED)	Team Giant–Alpecin	+ 0"
4	Maximiliano Richeze (ARG)	Etixx–Quick-Step	+ 0"
5	Giacomo Nizzolo (ITA)	Trek–Segafredo	+ 0"
6	Nicola Ruffoni (ITA)	Bardiani–CSF	+ 0"
7	Steele Von Hoff (AUS)	ONE Pro Cycling	+ 0"
8	Christopher Latham (GBR)	WIGGINS	+ 0"
9	Daniel McLay (GBR)	Great Britain	+ 0"
10	Jens Debusschere (BEL)	Lotto–Soudal	+ 0"

General classification after Stage 1

Rank	Rider	Team	Time
1	André Greipel (GER)	Lotto–Soudal	3h 52' 30"
2	Jasper Bovenhuis (NED)	An Post–Chain Reaction	+ 1"
3	Caleb Ewan (AUS)	Orica–BikeExchange	+ 4"
4	Peter Williams (GBR)	ONE Pro Cycling	+ 4"
5	Ramon Sinkeldam (NED)	Team Giant–Alpecin	+ 6"
6	Jonathan McEvoy (GBR)	NFTO	+ 8"
7	Tom Moses (GBR)	JLT–Condor	+ 9"
8	Maximiliano Richeze (ARG)	Etixx–Quick-Step	+ 10"
9	Giacomo Nizzolo (ITA)	Trek–Segafredo	+ 10"
10	Nicola Ruffoni (ITA)	Bardiani–CSF	+ 10"

=== Stage 2 ===
5 September 2016 — Carlisle to Kendal, 188.2 km (117 mi)

Stage 2 result

Rank	Rider	Team	Time
1	Julien Vermote (BEL)	Etixx–Quick-Step	4h 40' 50"
2	Steve Cummings (GBR)	Team Dimension Data	+ 2"
3	Dan Martin (IRL)	Etixx–Quick-Step	+ 58"
4	Xandro Meurisse (BEL)	Wanty–Groupe Gobert	+ 58"
5	Tony Gallopin (FRA)	Lotto–Soudal	+ 58"
6	Ben Swift (GBR)	Team Sky	+ 58"
7	Guillaume Martin (FRA)	Wanty–Groupe Gobert	+ 1' 02"
8	Tom Dumoulin (NED)	Team Giant–Alpecin	+ 1' 02"
9	Dylan van Baarle (NED)	Cannondale–Drapac	+ 1' 02"
10	Jacopo Mosca (ITA)	Trek–Segafredo	+ 1' 06"

General classification after Stage 2

Rank	Rider	Team	Time
1	Julien Vermote (BEL)	Etixx–Quick-Step	8h 33' 20"
2	Steve Cummings (GBR)	Team Dimension Data	+ 6"
3	Dan Martin (IRL)	Etixx–Quick-Step	+ 1' 04"
4	Xandro Meurisse (BEL)	Wanty–Groupe Gobert	+ 1' 08"
5	Ben Swift (GBR)	Team Sky	+ 1' 08"
6	Tony Gallopin (FRA)	Lotto–Soudal	+ 1' 08"
7	Dylan van Baarle (NED)	Cannondale–Drapac	+ 1' 12"
8	Guillaume Martin (FRA)	Wanty–Groupe Gobert	+ 1' 12"
9	Tom Dumoulin (NED)	Team Giant–Alpecin	+ 1' 12"
10	Nicolas Roche (IRL)	Team Sky	+ 1' 16"

=== Stage 3 ===
6 September 2016 — Congleton to Tatton Park, 179.4 km (111 mi)

Stage 3 result

Rank	Rider	Team	Time
1	Ian Stannard (GBR)	Team Sky	4h 14' 12"
2	Graham Briggs (GBR)	JLT–Condor	+ 1' 46"
3	Kristian House (GBR)	ONE Pro Cycling	+ 1' 46"
4	Nicola Ruffoni (ITA)	Bardiani–CSF	+ 5' 43"
5	Danny van Poppel (NED)	Team Sky	+ 5' 43"
6	Ramon Sinkeldam (NED)	Team Giant–Alpecin	+ 5' 43"
7	Christopher Latham (GBR)	WIGGINS	+ 5' 43"
8	Rick Zabel (GER)	BMC Racing Team	+ 5' 43"
9	Dylan van Baarle (NED)	Cannondale–Drapac	+ 5' 43"
10	Luka Mezgec (SLO)	Orica–BikeExchange	+ 5' 43"

General classification after Stage 3

Rank	Rider	Team	Time
1	Julien Vermote (BEL)	Etixx–Quick-Step	12h 53' 15"
2	Steve Cummings (GBR)	Team Dimension Data	+ 6"
3	Dan Martin (IRL)	Etixx–Quick-Step	+ 1' 04"
4	Ben Swift (GBR)	Team Sky	+ 1' 08"
5	Xandro Meurisse (BEL)	Wanty–Groupe Gobert	+ 1' 08"
6	Tony Gallopin (FRA)	Lotto–Soudal	+ 1' 08"
7	Dylan van Baarle (NED)	Cannondale–Drapac	+ 1' 12"
8	Guillaume Martin (FRA)	Wanty–Groupe Gobert	+ 1' 12"
9	Tom Dumoulin (NED)	Team Giant–Alpecin	+ 1' 12"
10	Nicolas Roche (IRL)	Team Sky	+ 1' 16"

=== Stage 4 ===
7 September 2016 — Denbigh to Builth Wells, 218 km (135 mi)

Stage 4 result

Rank	Rider	Team	Time
1	Dylan Groenewegen (NED)	LottoNL–Jumbo	5h 28' 49"
2	Daniel McLay (GBR)	Great Britain	+ 0"
3	Ben Swift (GBR)	Team Sky	+ 0"
4	Carlos Barbero (ESP)	Caja Rural–Seguros RGA	+ 0"
5	Julien Vermote (BEL)	Etixx–Quick-Step	+ 0"
6	Boy van Poppel (NED)	Trek–Segafredo	+ 0"
7	Luka Mezgec (SLO)	Orica–BikeExchange	+ 0"
8	Nicolas Vereecken (BEL)	An Post–Chain Reaction	+ 0"
9	Tom Dumoulin (NED)	Team Giant–Alpecin	+ 0"
10	Diego Rubio (ESP)	Caja Rural–Seguros RGA	+ 0"

General classification after Stage 4

Rank	Rider	Team	Time
1	Julien Vermote (BEL)	Etixx–Quick-Step	18h 22' 04"
2	Steve Cummings (GBR)	Team Dimension Data	+ 6"
3	Ben Swift (GBR)	Team Sky	+ 1' 03"
4	Tony Gallopin (FRA)	Lotto–Soudal	+ 1' 03"
5	Dan Martin (IRL)	Etixx–Quick-Step	+ 1' 04"
6	Xandro Meurisse (BEL)	Wanty–Groupe Gobert	+ 1' 08"
7	Dylan van Baarle (NED)	Cannondale–Drapac	+ 1' 12"
8	Tom Dumoulin (NED)	Team Giant–Alpecin	+ 1' 12"
9	Guillaume Martin (FRA)	Wanty–Groupe Gobert	+ 1' 12"
10	Nicolas Roche (IRL)	Team Sky	+ 1' 16"

- Local resident Roger Armstrong went for his usual ride and accidentally entered the stage between the first group of police bikes and the peloton. Wearing a Team GB Olympic kit, he was mistaken by spectators as a competitor. He pulled over to let the peloton pass.

=== Stage 5 ===
8 September 2016 — Aberdare to Bath, 194.5 km (121 mi)

Stage 5 result

Rank	Rider	Team	Time
1	Jack Bauer (NZL)	Cannondale–Drapac	4h 45' 25"
2	Amaël Moinard (FRA)	BMC Racing Team	+ 0"
3	Erick Rowsell (GBR)	Madison Genesis	+ 0"
4	Caleb Ewan (AUS)	Orica–BikeExchange	+ 0"
5	Dylan Groenewegen (NED)	LottoNL–Jumbo	+ 0"
6	Boy van Poppel (NED)	Trek–Segafredo	+ 0"
7	Jens Debusschere (BEL)	Lotto–Soudal	+ 0"
8	Daniel McLay (GBR)	Great Britain	+ 0"
9	Nicola Ruffoni (ITA)	Bardiani–CSF	+ 0"
10	Domingos Gonçalves (POR)	Caja Rural–Seguros RGA	+ 0"

General classification after Stage 5

Rank	Rider	Team	Time
1	Julien Vermote (BEL)	Etixx–Quick-Step	23h 07' 29"
2	Steve Cummings (GBR)	Team Dimension Data	+ 6"
3	Ben Swift (GBR)	Team Sky	+ 1' 03"
4	Tony Gallopin (FRA)	Lotto–Soudal	+ 1' 03"
5	Dan Martin (IRL)	Etixx–Quick-Step	+ 1' 04"
6	Xandro Meurisse (BEL)	Wanty–Groupe Gobert	+ 1' 08"
7	Dylan van Baarle (NED)	Cannondale–Drapac	+ 1' 12"
8	Tom Dumoulin (NED)	Team Giant–Alpecin	+ 1' 12"
9	Jacopo Mosca (ITA)	Trek–Segafredo	+ 1' 16"
10	Nicolas Roche (IRL)	Team Sky	+ 1' 16"

=== Stage 6 ===
9 September 2016 — Sidmouth to Haytor, 149.9 km (93 mi)

Stage 6 result

Rank	Rider	Team	Time
1	Wout Poels (NED)	Team Sky	3h 56' 15"
2	Rohan Dennis (AUS)	BMC Racing Team	+ 7"
3	Tom Dumoulin (NED)	Team Giant–Alpecin	+ 8"
4	Dylan van Baarle (NED)	Cannondale–Drapac	+ 12"
5	Xandro Meurisse (BEL)	Wanty–Groupe Gobert	+ 17"
6	Nicolas Roche (IRL)	Team Sky	+ 17"
7	Tony Gallopin (FRA)	Lotto–Soudal	+ 17"
8	Steve Cummings (GBR)	Team Dimension Data	+ 21"
9	Erick Rowsell (GBR)	Madison Genesis	+ 31"
10	Gorka Izagirre (ESP)	Movistar Team	+ 31"

General classification after Stage 6

Rank	Rider	Team	Time
1	Steve Cummings (GBR)	Team Dimension Data	27h 04' 11"
2	Tom Dumoulin (NED)	Team Giant–Alpecin	+ 49"
3	Rohan Dennis (AUS)	BMC Racing Team	+ 51"
4	Tony Gallopin (FRA)	Lotto–Soudal	+ 53"
5	Dylan van Baarle (NED)	Cannondale–Drapac	+ 57"
6	Xandro Meurisse (BEL)	Wanty–Groupe Gobert	+ 58"
7	Nicolas Roche (IRL)	Team Sky	+ 1' 06"
8	Ben Swift (GBR)	Team Sky	+ 1' 14"
9	Jacopo Mosca (ITA)	Trek–Segafredo	+ 1' 20"
10	Guillaume Martin (FRA)	Wanty–Groupe Gobert	+ 1' 24"

=== Stage 7a ===
10 September 2016 — Bristol, 14.2 km (9 mi), individual time trial (ITT)

Stage 7a result

Rank	Rider	Team	Time
1	Tony Martin (GER)	Etixx–Quick-Step	18' 06"
2	Rohan Dennis (AUS)	BMC Racing Team	+ 3"
3	Tom Dumoulin (NED)	Team Giant–Alpecin	+ 5"
4	Steve Cummings (GBR)	Team Dimension Data	+ 16"
5	Tony Gallopin (FRA)	Lotto–Soudal	+ 25"
6	Gorka Izagirre (ESP)	Movistar Team	+ 25"
7	Alex Dowsett (GBR)	Movistar Team	+ 35"
8	Nicolas Roche (IRL)	Team Sky	+ 36"
9	Ryan Mullen (IRL)	Cannondale–Drapac	+ 39"
10	Dylan van Baarle (NED)	Cannondale–Drapac	+ 40"

General classification after Stage 7a

Rank	Rider	Team	Time
1	Steve Cummings (GBR)	Team Dimension Data	27h 22' 33"
2	Tom Dumoulin (NED)	Team Giant–Alpecin	+ 38"
3	Rohan Dennis (AUS)	BMC Racing Team	+ 38"
4	Tony Gallopin (FRA)	Lotto–Soudal	+ 1' 02"
5	Dylan van Baarle (NED)	Cannondale–Drapac	+ 1' 21"
6	Nicolas Roche (IRL)	Team Sky	+ 1' 26"
7	Xandro Meurisse (BEL)	Wanty–Groupe Gobert	+ 1' 48"
8	Ben Swift (GBR)	Team Sky	+ 1' 52"
9	Julien Vermote (BEL)	Etixx–Quick-Step	+ 2' 08"
10	Jacopo Mosca (ITA)	Trek–Segafredo	+ 2' 32"

=== Stage 7b ===
10 September 2016 — Bristol, 90.6 km (56 mi)

Stage 7b result

Rank	Rider	Team	Time
1	Rohan Dennis (AUS)	BMC Racing Team	1h 58' 42"
2	Maximiliano Richeze (ARG)	Etixx–Quick-Step	+ 6"
3	Dylan Groenewegen (NED)	LottoNL–Jumbo	+ 6"
4	Danny van Poppel (NED)	Team Sky	+ 6"
5	Carlos Barbero (ESP)	Caja Rural–Seguros RGA	+ 6"
6	Xandro Meurisse (BEL)	Wanty–Groupe Gobert	+ 6"
7	Luka Mezgec (SLO)	Orica–BikeExchange	+ 6"
8	Tony Gallopin (FRA)	Lotto–Soudal	+ 6"
9	Marco Marcato (ITA)	Wanty–Groupe Gobert	+ 6"
10	Dylan van Baarle (NED)	Cannondale–Drapac	+ 6"

General classification after Stage 7b

Rank	Rider	Team	Time
1	Steve Cummings (GBR)	Team Dimension Data	29h 21' 21"
2	Rohan Dennis (AUS)	BMC Racing Team	+ 26"
3	Tom Dumoulin (NED)	Team Giant–Alpecin	+ 38"
4	Tony Gallopin (FRA)	Lotto–Soudal	+ 1' 02"
5	Dylan van Baarle (NED)	Cannondale–Drapac	+ 1' 21"
6	Nicolas Roche (IRL)	Team Sky	+ 1' 26"
7	Xandro Meurisse (BEL)	Wanty–Groupe Gobert	+ 1' 48"
8	Ben Swift (GBR)	Team Sky	+ 1' 52"
9	Julien Vermote (BEL)	Etixx–Quick-Step	+ 2' 12"
10	Jacopo Mosca (ITA)	Trek–Segafredo	+ 2' 32"

=== Stage 8 ===
11 September 2016 — London, 99.2 km (62 mi)

Stage 8 result

Rank	Rider	Team	Time
1	Caleb Ewan (AUS)	Orica–BikeExchange	2h 09' 24"
2	Dylan Groenewegen (NED)	LottoNL–Jumbo	+ 0"
3	Jens Debusschere (BEL)	Lotto–Soudal	+ 0"
4	Boy van Poppel (NED)	Trek–Segafredo	+ 0"
5	Elia Viviani (ITA)	Team Sky	+ 0"
6	André Greipel (GER)	Lotto–Soudal	+ 0"
7	Daniel McLay (GBR)	Great Britain	+ 0"
8	Steele Von Hoff (AUS)	ONE Pro Cycling	+ 0"
9	Nicola Ruffoni (ITA)	Bardiani–CSF	+ 0"
10	Paolo Simion (ITA)	Bardiani–CSF	+ 0"

Final General classification

Rank	Rider	Team	Time
1	Steve Cummings (GBR)	Team Dimension Data	31h 30' 45"
2	Rohan Dennis (AUS)	BMC Racing Team	+ 26"
3	Tom Dumoulin (NED)	Team Giant–Alpecin	+ 38"
4	Tony Gallopin (FRA)	Lotto–Soudal	+ 1' 02"
5	Dylan van Baarle (NED)	Cannondale–Drapac	+ 1' 21"
6	Nicolas Roche (IRL)	Team Sky	+ 1' 26"
7	Xandro Meurisse (BEL)	Wanty–Groupe Gobert	+ 1' 48"
8	Ben Swift (GBR)	Team Sky	+ 1' 52"
9	Julien Vermote (BEL)	Etixx–Quick-Step	+ 2' 12"
10	Jacopo Mosca (ITA)	Trek–Segafredo	+ 2' 32"

== Classification leadership ==
Classification leadership by stage
Stage	Winner	General classification	Points classification	Mountains classification	Sprints classification	Team classification	Combativity
1	André Greipel	André Greipel	André Greipel	Peter Williams	Jasper Bovenhuis	Caja Rural–Seguros RGA	Tom Moses
2	Julien Vermote	Julien Vermote	Julien Vermote	Xandro Meurisse	André Greipel	Etixx–Quick-Step	Nicolas Roche
3	Ian Stannard	Julien Vermote	Ramon Sinkeldam	Xandro Meurisse	André Greipel	Etixx–Quick-Step	Ian Stannard
4	Dylan Groenewegen	Julien Vermote	Julien Vermote	Xandro Meurisse	Jasper Bovenhuis	Etixx–Quick-Step	Alessandro Tonelli
5	Jack Bauer	Julien Vermote	Daniel McLay	Xandro Meurisse	Jasper Bovenhuis	Etixx–Quick-Step	Jack Bauer
6	Wout Poels	Steve Cummings	Daniel McLay	Xandro Meurisse	Jasper Bovenhuis	Wanty–Groupe Gobert	Jasper Bovenhuis
7a	Tony Martin	Steve Cummings	Tom Dumoulin	Xandro Meurisse	Jasper Bovenhuis	Team Sky	not awarded
7b	Rohan Dennis	Steve Cummings	Rohan Dennis	Xandro Meurisse	Jasper Bovenhuis	Team Sky	André Greipel
8	Caleb Ewan	Steve Cummings	Dylan Groenewegen	Xandro Meurisse	Jasper Bovenhuis	Team Sky	Taylor Phinney
Final		Steve Cummings	Dylan Groenewegen	Xandro Meurisse	Jasper Bovenhuis	Team Sky	André Greipel

== Final standings ==
Legend
Yellow jersey	Denotes the leader of the general classification	Blue jersey	Denotes the leader of the points classification
Black jersey	Denotes the leader of the mountains classification	Green jersey	Denotes the leader of the sprints classification

=== General classification ===
Final general classification (1–10)
Rank	Rider	Team	Time
1	Steve Cummings (GBR)	Team Dimension Data	31h 30' 45"
2	Rohan Dennis (AUS)	BMC Racing Team	+ 26"
3	Tom Dumoulin (NED)	Team Giant–Alpecin	+ 38"
4	Tony Gallopin (FRA)	Lotto–Soudal	+ 1' 02"
5	Dylan van Baarle (NED)	Cannondale–Drapac	+ 1' 21"
6	Nicolas Roche (IRL)	Team Sky	+ 1' 26"
7	Xandro Meurisse (BEL)	Wanty–Groupe Gobert	+ 1' 48"
8	Ben Swift (GBR)	Team Sky	+ 1' 52"
9	Julien Vermote (BEL)	Etixx–Quick-Step	+ 2' 12"
10	Jacopo Mosca (ITA)	Trek–Segafredo	+ 2' 32"

=== Points classification ===
Final points classification (1–10)
Rank	Rider	Team	Points
1	Dylan Groenewegen (NED)	LottoNL–Jumbo	53
2	Rohan Dennis (AUS)	BMC Racing Team	47
3	Caleb Ewan (AUS)	Orica–BikeExchange	41
4	Tom Dumoulin (NED)	Team Giant–Alpecin	41
5	Tony Gallopin (FRA)	Lotto–Soudal	39
6	Dylan van Baarle (NED)	Cannondale–Drapac	39
7	Daniel McLay (GBR)	Great Britain	38
8	Boy van Poppel (NED)	Trek–Segafredo	37
9	Nicola Ruffoni (ITA)	Bardiani–CSF	36
10	Steve Cummings (GBR)	Team Dimension Data	35

=== Mountains classification ===
Final mountains classification (1–10)
Rank	Rider	Team	Points
1	Xandro Meurisse (BEL)	Wanty–Groupe Gobert	60
2	Nicolas Roche (IRL)	Team Sky	42
3	Miguel Ángel Benito (ESP)	Caja Rural–Seguros RGA	27
4	Kristian House (GBR)	ONE Pro Cycling	26
5	Jonathan McEvoy (GBR)	NFTO	25
6	Ian Stannard (GBR)	Team Sky	21
7	Peter Williams (GBR)	ONE Pro Cycling	20
8	Rohan Dennis (AUS)	BMC Racing Team	20
9	Wout Poels (NED)	Team Sky	17
10	Jacopo Mosca (ITA)	Trek–Segafredo	17

=== Sprints classification ===
Final sprints classification (1–10)
Rank	Rider	Team	Points
1	Jasper Bovenhuis (NED)	An Post–Chain Reaction	24
2	André Greipel (GER)	Lotto–Soudal	12
3	Jonathan McEvoy (GBR)	NFTO	10
4	Matt Cronshaw (GBR)	Madison Genesis	6
5	Peter Williams (GBR)	ONE Pro Cycling	6
6	Miguel Ángel Benito (ESP)	Caja Rural–Seguros RGA	6
7	Conor Dunne (IRL)	JLT–Condor	6
8	Tony Gallopin (FRA)	Lotto–Soudal	5
9	Erick Rowsell (GBR)	Madison Genesis	5
10	Giovanni Visconti (ITA)	Movistar Team	5

=== Best British classification ===
Final Best British classification (1–10)
Rank	Rider	Team	Time
1	Steve Cummings	Team Dimension Data	31h 30' 45"
2	Ben Swift	Team Sky	+ 1' 52"
3	Mark Christian	WIGGINS	+ 4' 02"
4	Tao Geoghegan Hart	Great Britain	+ 5' 23"
5	Erick Rowsell	Madison Genesis	+ 5' 41"
6	Steven Lampier	JLT–Condor	+ 7' 05"
7	Edmund Bradbury	NFTO	+ 9' 32"
8	Russell Downing	JLT–Condor	+ 9' 54"
9	Tom Stewart	Madison Genesis	+ 18' 29"
10	Alistair Slater	JLT–Condor	+ 19' 55"

=== Team classification ===
Final team classification (1–10)
Rank	Team	Time
1	Team Sky	94h 43' 33"
2	Wanty–Groupe Gobert	+ 1' 17"
3	Etixx–Quick-Step	+ 2' 15"
4	Cannondale–Drapac	+ 9' 17"
5	BMC Racing Team	+ 15' 49"
6	Team Giant–Alpecin	+ 19' 00"
7	JLT–Condor	+ 21' 39"
8	Caja Rural–Seguros RGA	+ 21' 59"
9	Bardiani–CSF	+ 24' 04"
10	Movistar Team	+ 26' 04"

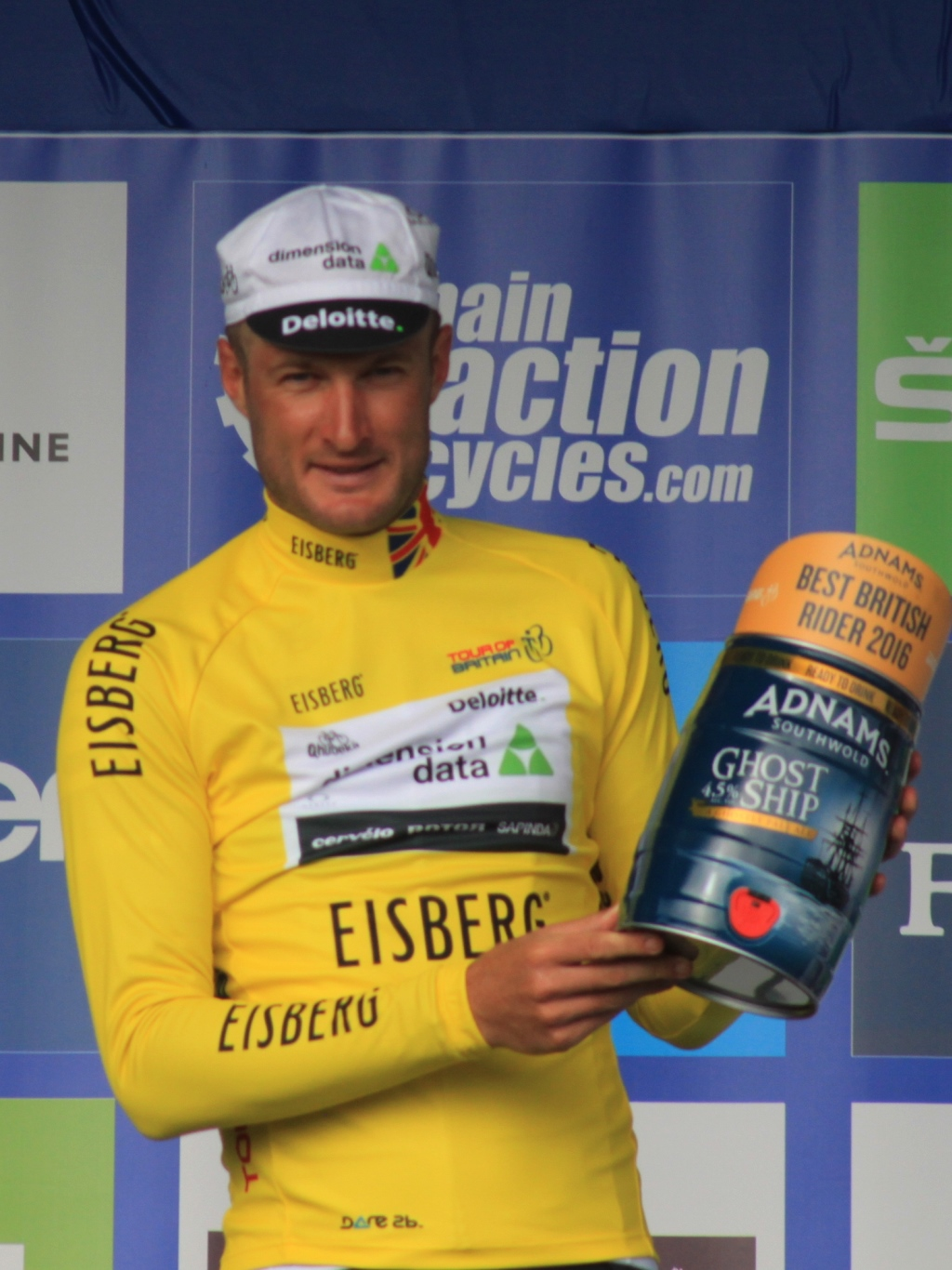
Steve Cummings
(GC winner and best British rider)

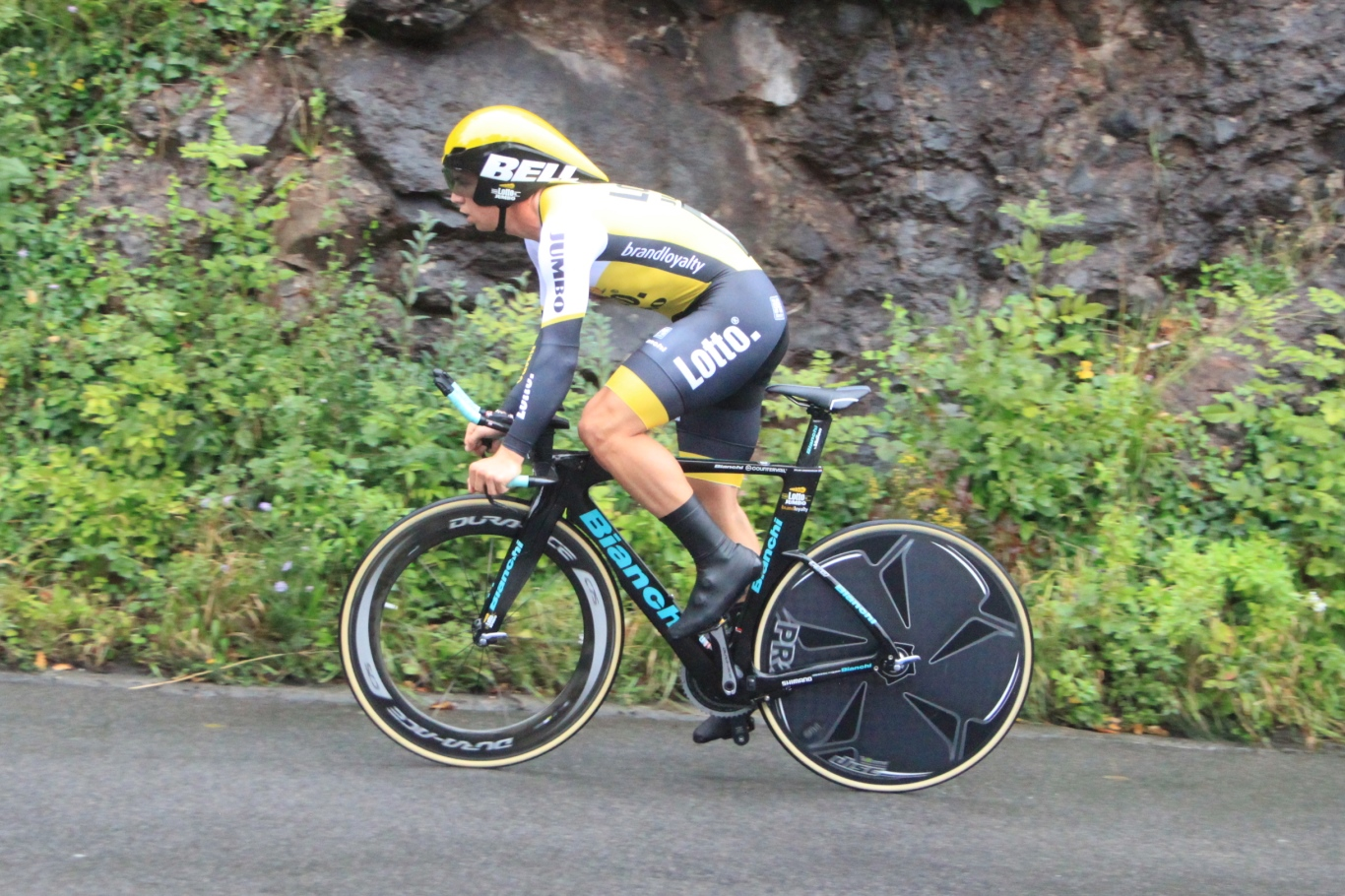
Dylan Groenewegen (Points winner)

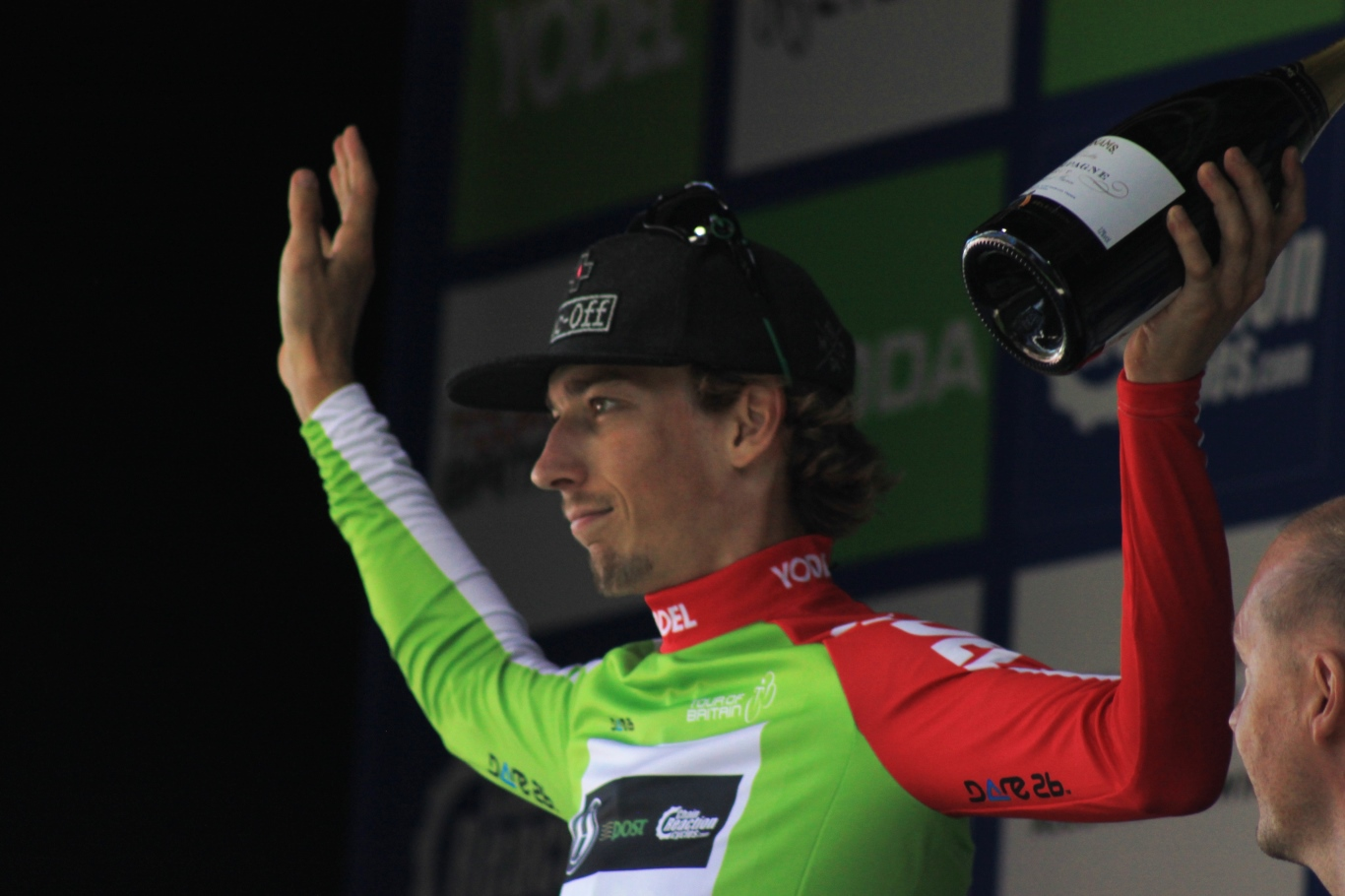
Jasper Bovenhuis (Sprints winner)

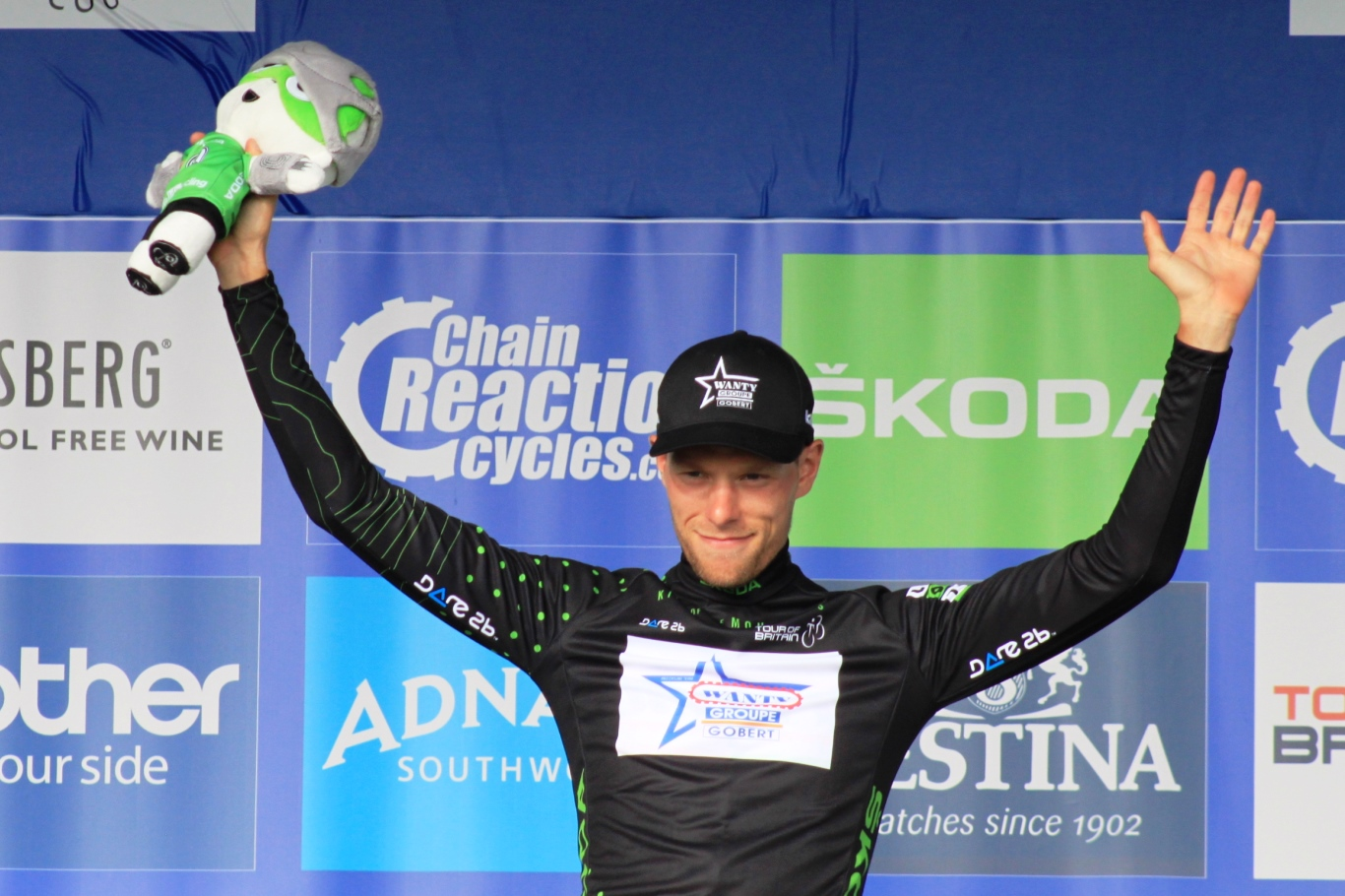
Xandro Meurisse
(King of the Mountains)

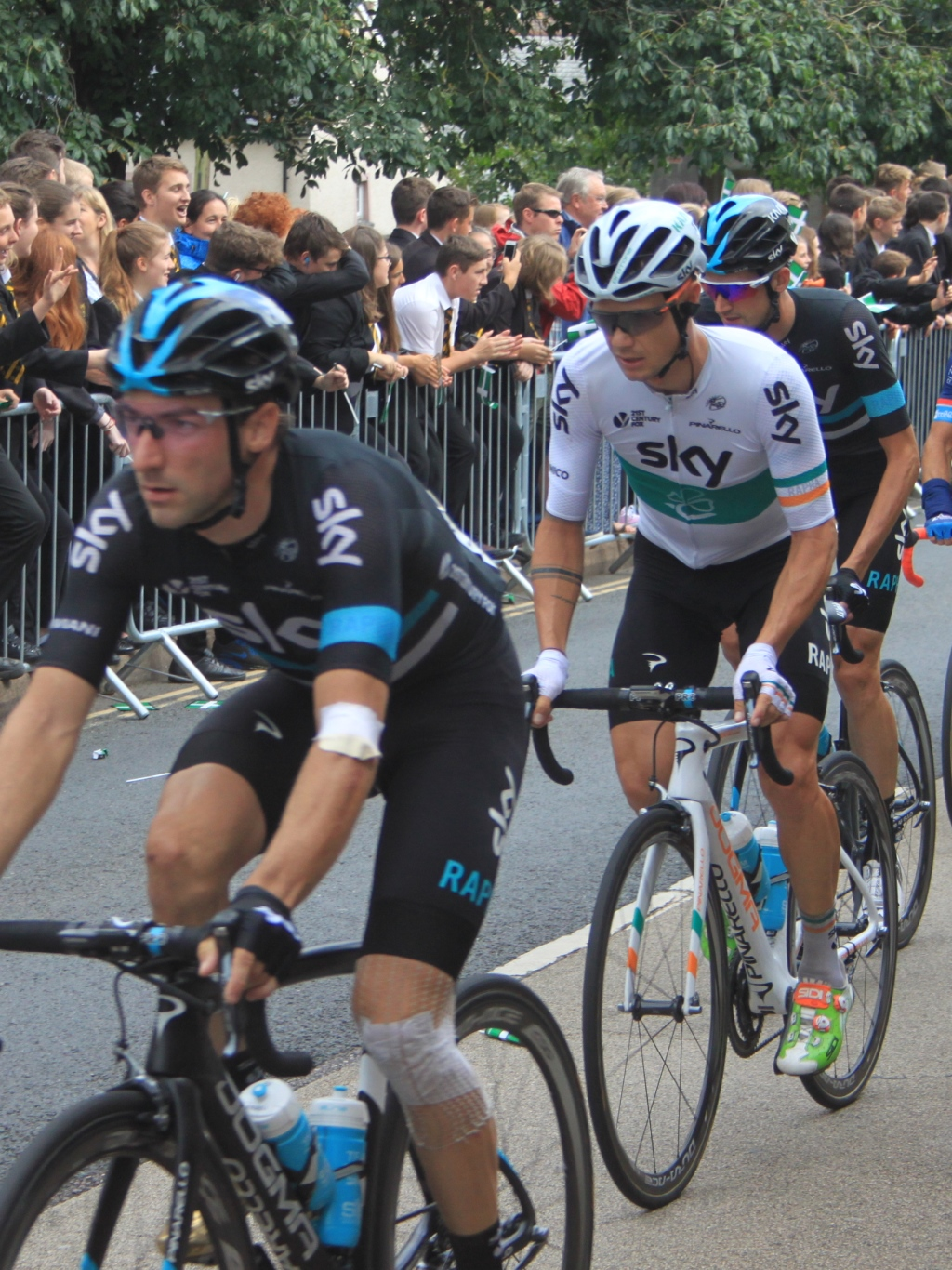
Team Sky
(Winning team)
