= Tom Barras =

Tom Barras may refer to:

- Tom Barras (cyclist) (born 1978), English road racing cyclist
- Tom Barras (rower) (born 1994), British rower

== See also ==
- Tom Barrass (born 1995), Australian rules footballer
