= Driedaagse van Axel =

Road cycling race

Race details
- Date: May
- Region: Netherlands
- English name: Three Days of Axel
- Discipline: Road race
- Type: Stage race
- Web site: www.juniorendriedaagse.nl/welkom/

History
- First edition: 1982
- Editions: 40 (as of 2023)
- First winner: Jack van der Horst (NED)
- Most wins: Jasper Bovenhuis (NED) (2 wins)
- Most recent: Léo Bisiaux (FRA)

The SPIE Internationale Junioren Driedaagse van Axel (English: Three Days of Axel) is a junior (ages 17–18) multi-day cycling race held annually in the Netherlands. It was part of the UCI Junior World Cup from 1993 to 2007.

== Winners ==
Year	Winner	Second	Third
1982	(Netherlands) Jack van der Horst	(Netherlands) E. Roovers	(Netherlands) R. Rijkenberg
1983	(Netherlands) Peter van de Klundert	(Netherlands) W. Roovers	(Netherlands) M. Duyenstein
1984	(Netherlands) Herbert Dijkstra	(Netherlands) Tom Cordes	(Netherlands) Arjan Jagt
1985	(Netherlands) Andre van Reek	(Netherlands) William Derns	(Netherlands) Niek de Taeye
1986	(Netherlands) Erik Hans Pauwe	(Netherlands) Yvan Louter	(Netherlands) John Kruithof
1987	(Netherlands) Raymond Thebes	(Netherlands) Richard Jansen	(Netherlands) Mark Krabbenburg
1988	(Netherlands) Servais Knaven	(Italy) Andrea Peron	(Italy) Gianluca Tarocco
1989	(Italy) Davide Rebellin	(Italy) Andrea Peron	(Netherlands) Richard Groenendaal
1990	(Netherlands) Léon van Bon	(France) Sébastien Rondeau	(Netherlands) Niels van der Steen
1991	(Australia) Henk Vogels	(France) Nicolas Jalabert	(Netherlands) Koos Moerenhout
1992	(Netherlands) Robert Koppers	(Netherlands) Charles Overgaag	(Netherlands) Maurice van Rijn
1993	(Netherlands) Johan Bruinsma	(Netherlands) Robert Koppers	(Germany) Andreas Klier
1994	(Germany) Andreas Klier	(Italy) Alessandro Rota	(Germany) Jörg Jaksche
1995	(Ukraine) Andrey Korolev	(Denmark) Jacob Nielsen	(Netherlands) Wopke Veenstra
1996	(Netherlands) Vincent van der Kooij	(Netherlands) Camiel van den Bergh	(Netherlands) Björn Vonk
1997	(Netherlands) Bram de Waard	(Switzerland) Martin Bolt	(Netherlands) Roel Egelmeers
1998	(Germany) Eric Baumann	(Belgium) Jurgen Van Goolen	(Belgium) Tom Boonen
1999	(Belgium) Filip Verscuren	(Netherlands) Martijn Stougie	(United Kingdom) Tom Southam
2000	(Germany) Marcel Sieberg	(Poland) Błażej Janiaczyk	(Netherlands) Kenny van Hummel
2001	(Germany) Christian Meschenmoser	(Netherlands) Martijn Maaskant	(Poland) Błażej Janiaczyk
2002	(Denmark) Matti Breschel	(Poland) Michał Gołaś	(United States) Oliver Steiler-Cote
2003	(Netherlands) Kai Reus	(Belgium) Michiel Van Aelbroeck	(Belgium) Jasper Melis
2004	(Poland) Pawel Mikulicz	(Belgium) Stijn Joseph	(Netherlands) Michel Kreder
2005	(Denmark) Thomas Riber-Sellebjerg	(Denmark) Kasper Thustrup	(Italy) Jacopo Guarnieri
2006	(Denmark) Morten Birck Reckweg	(Belgium) Sven Vandousselaere	(Netherlands) Ronan van Zandbeek
2007	(United Kingdom) Adam Blythe	(Germany) Philipp Ries	(Netherlands) Jetse Bol
2008	(Netherlands) Jasper Bovenhuis	(United Kingdom) Erick Rowsell	(Netherlands) Rune van der Meijden
2009	(Netherlands) Jasper Bovenhuis	(Germany) Nikias Arndt	(Belgium) Jasper Stuyven
2010	(Netherlands) Danny van Poppel	(Germany) Mario Vogt	(Netherlands) Dylan van Baarle
2011	(Denmark) Alexander Kamp	(Netherlands) Danny van Poppel	(Switzerland) Stefan Küng
2012	(Denmark) Mads Würtz Schmidt	(Netherlands) Piotr Havik	(Germany) Leon Rohde
2013	(Belgium) Brent Luyckx	(Denmark) Simon Larsen	(Denmark) Mathias Rask Jeppesen
2014	(Netherlands) Peter Lenderink	(Germany) Jan Tschernoster	(Netherlands) Bram Welten
2015	(Germany) Max Kanter	(Switzerland) Mario Spengler	(United Kingdom) Matthew Bostock
2016	(Switzerland) Stefan Bissegger	(Netherlands) Jarno Mobach	(Australia) Harry Sweeny
2017	(Netherlands) Alex Molenaar	(Denmark) Johan Langballe	(Belgium) Ward Vanhoof
2018	(Switzerland) Alexandre Balmer	(France) Valentin Retailleau	(United Kingdom) Mason Hollyman
2019	(United States) Quinn Simmons	(Netherlands) Hidde Van Veenendaal	(Germany) Hannes Wilksch
2020	No race		
2021	(United States) Artem Shmidt	(United Kingdom) Joshua Tarling	(Belgium) Alec Segaert
2022	(Denmark) Henrik Pedersen	(Luxembourg) Niels Michotte	(United States) Artem Shmidt
2023	(France) Léo Bisiaux	(Netherlands) Guus van den Eijnden	(Netherlands) Mees Vlot
