= Erick Rowsell =

British road racing cyclist (born 1990)

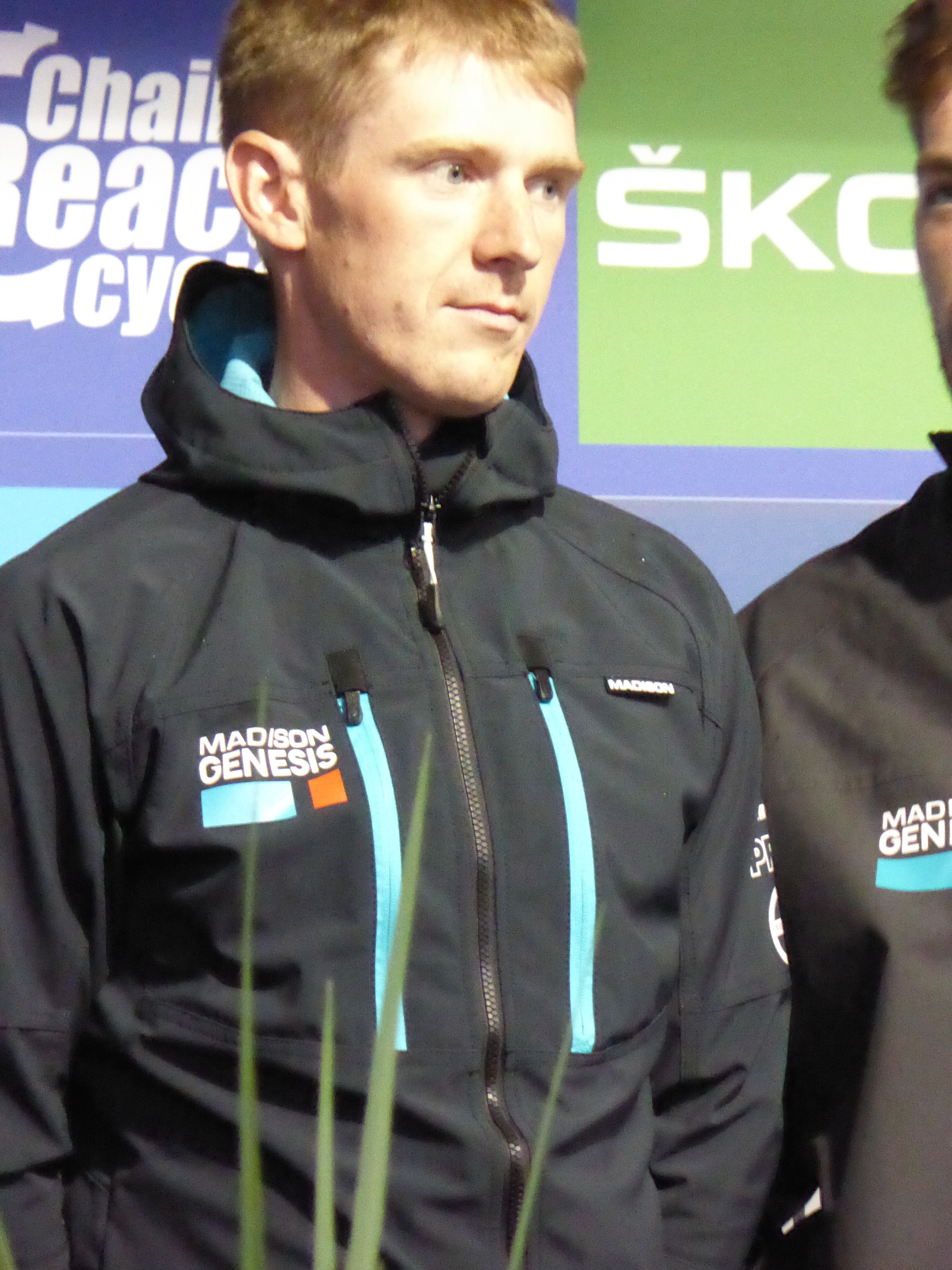
- Rowsell at the 2016 Tour of Britain

Personal information
- Full name: Erick Rowsell
- Born: 29 July 1990 (age 36)

Cycling career
- Sport: Cycling
- Discipline: Road
- Role: Rider

Amateur teams
- 2010: 100% ME
- 2011: Team Corridori/Specialized

Professional teams
- 2012: Endura Racing
- 2013–2014: NetApp–Endura
- 2015–2019: Madison Genesis

Erick Rowsell (born 29 July 1990) is a British former professional road racing cyclist, who rode professionally between 2012 and 2019 for the Endura Racing, NetApp–Endura, and Madison Genesis teams. He now works as the Elite Road Racing Manager for British Cycling, having previously been a member of their Olympic Development Programme as an endurance rider.

== Career ==
He won the junior race at the 2007 British National Time Trial Championships in an upset of world champion Peter Kennaugh. The following year, he won the junior race at the British National Road Race Championships.

Having won the prologue time trial of the Junior Tour of Wales in 2008, Rowsell won the three-day event – joining previous winners such as Charly Wegelius and Geraint Thomas – by eight seconds from Norwegian Johan Fredrik Ziesler of the Nymark team.

In November 2014 Madison Genesis announced that Rowsell would be part of the team's line-up for the 2015 season.

== Personal life ==
His older sister Joanna Rowsell also competed professionally as a road and track cyclist.

== Major results ==
2007
National Junior Road Championships

1st Time trial
3rd Road race

2nd Overall Junior Tour of Wales
3rd Individual pursuit, National Junior Track Championships
2008
1st Road race, National Junior Road Championships
1st Overall Junior Tour of Wales

1st Stage 1

2nd Team pursuit, UEC European Junior Track Championships
2nd Overall Driedaagse van Axel
3rd Points race, National Junior Track Championships
3rd Overall Tour du Pays de Vaud Juniors
2009
2nd Team pursuit, UEC European Under-23 Track Championships
2010
3rd Madison, National Track Championships (with George Atkins)
2011
2nd Team pursuit, UEC European Under-23 Track Championships
3rd Team pursuit, 2010–11 UCI Track Cycling World Cup Classics, Beijing
3rd Road race, National Under-23 Road Championships
2012
2nd Overall Tour Doon Hame

1st Stage 1

6th Overall Tour Alsace
7th Overall Tour de Normandie

1st Stage 5

7th Overall Tour de Bretagne
2014
5th Dwars door Drenthe
2015
1st Overall Tour of the Reservoir

1st Stage 1

8th Overall Tour de Yorkshire
2018
5th Rutland–Melton CiCLE Classic
