= Tom Barras (cyclist) =

English racing cyclist

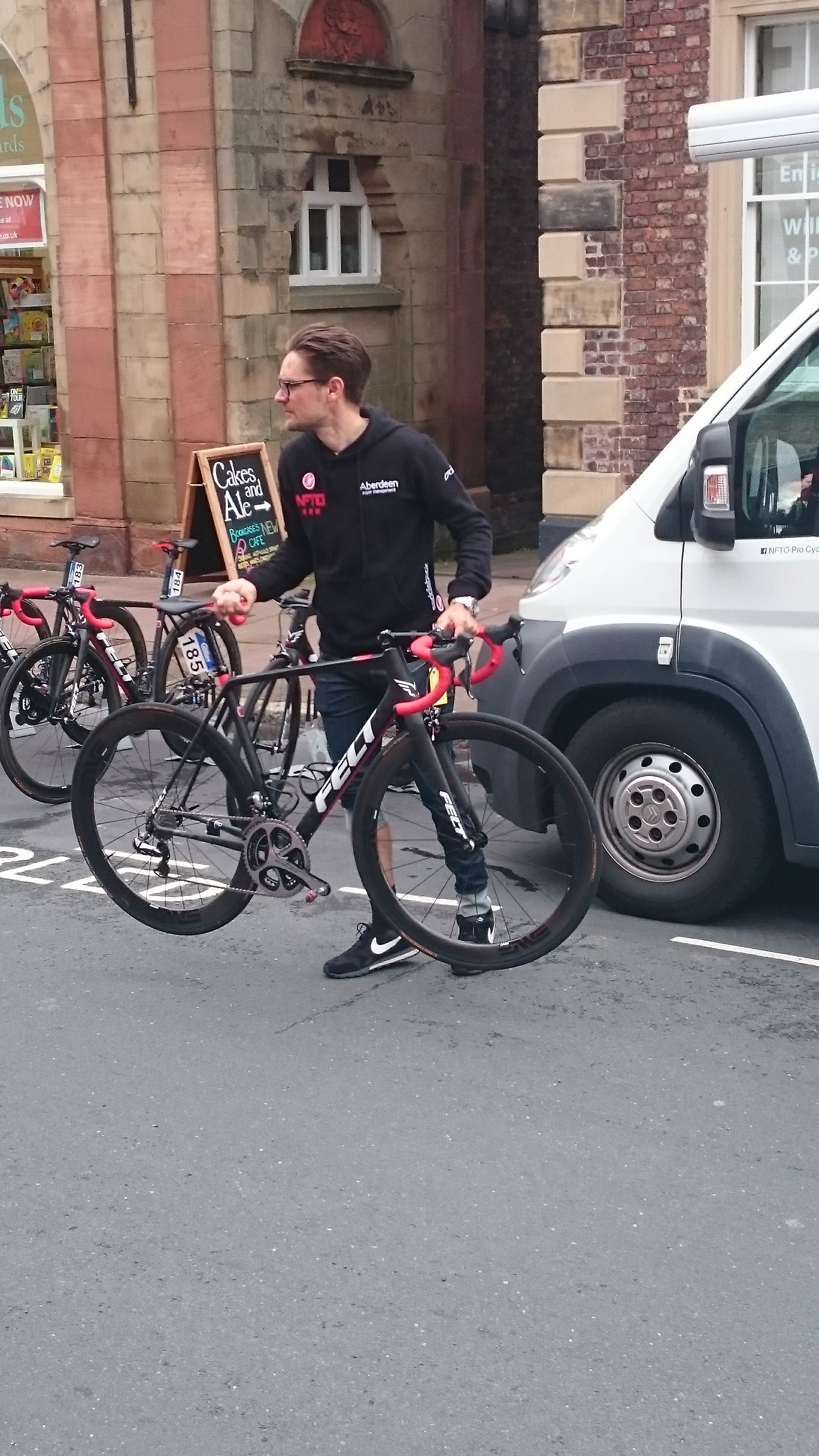
- Barras at the 2016 Tour of Britain

Personal information
- Full name: Thomas John Barras
- Nickname: Tom
- Born: 21 June 1978 (age 48) Laycock, Keighley, West Yorkshire, England, United Kingdom

Cycling career
- Sport: Cycling
- Current team: Retired
- Discipline: Road
- Role: Rider; Directeur sportif

Amateur teams
- 2000: Linda McCartney Racing Team (stagiaire)
- 2003: Palmans-Collstrop (stagiaire)

Professional teams
- 2001–2003: Team Down Under
- 2004–2005: Team Cyclingnews.com-Down Under
- 2006: DFL-Cyclingnews-Litespeed
- 2007: Merlin Racing Team
- 2008–2009: Plowman Craven-Evans Cycles
- 2010: Team Raleigh
- 2011–2012: CyclePremier.com-Metaltek
- 2013–2014: Wheelbase-Altura-MGD
- 2015: NFTO

Managerial team
- 2016: NFTO

Thomas John Barras (born 21 June 1978) is an English former professional road racing cyclist, who took more than 100 race wins during his career. Barras is also the son of former professional racing cyclist, Sid Barras.

== Career ==
Barras was born in Keighley, West Yorkshire. After graduating from Loughborough University in 2000, Barras started his professional career in Belgium, before returning to the UK in 2006. He combined his racing with work as a web designer from 2007. Barras was ranked 13th in the UK national road rankings at the end of the 2007 racing season. In December 2014 he was announced as a member of the NFTO squad for 2015. Barras retired from racing at the end of the 2015 season, but remained with NFTO as a directeur sportif.

He now runs his own coaching company Training Pro.

== Major results ==
2007
1st Roger Martin Memorial Race
1st Brighouse Town Centre Elite Criterium
3rd Round 1, National Criterium Series, Crawley
3rd Darley Moor Circuit Race
2008
1st Overall Bermuda Grand Prix

1st Stages 1 & 2

2009
1st Overall Bermuda Grand Prix

1st Stage 1

1st Road race, Yorkshire Regional Road Championships
2011
1st Hillingdon GP
2012
1st Stage 3 Holme Valley Wheelers 2-day
3rd Sheffrec CC Spring Road Race
2013
2nd York Cycleworks Elite Road Race
2014
1st Round 2, North East Spring Cup - Middlesbrough
2nd Round 5, Chevin Cycles Evening Road Race Series - Boroughbridge
2015
1st Ducan Sparrow Road Race
