= Jasper Bovenhuis =

Dutch cyclist (born 1991)

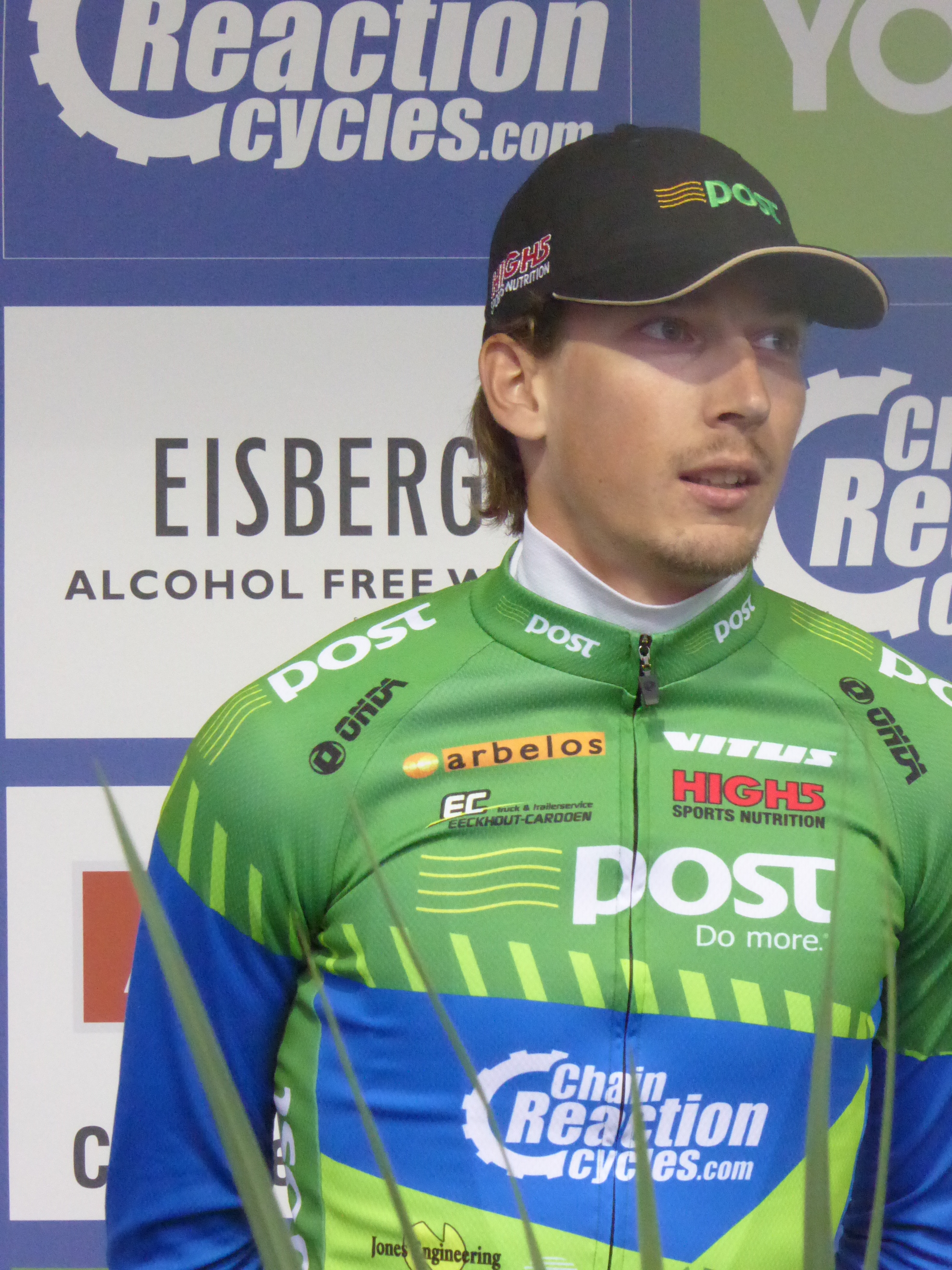
- Bovenhuis at the 2016 Tour of Britain

Personal information
- Full name: Jasper Bovenhuis
- Born: 27 July 1991 (age 35) Rouveen, Netherlands

Cycling career
- Sport: Cycling
- Current team: Retired
- Discipline: Road
- Role: Rider

Amateur team
- 2017: Vlasman Cycling Team

Professional teams
- 2010–2013: Rabobank Continental Team
- 2014: Koga Cycling Team
- 2015: SEG Racing
- 2015: Cannondale–Garmin (stagiaire)
- 2016: An Post–Chain Reaction
- 2018–2020: Vlasman Cycling Team

Jasper Bovenhuis (born 27 July 1991) is a Dutch former racing cyclist, who rode professionally between 2010 and 2016, and 2018 to 2020 for six different teams. He rode at the 2013 UCI Road World Championships, and in 2015, he rode for UCI WorldTeam Cannondale–Garmin as a stagiaire.

== Major results ==
2008
1st Overall Driedaagse van Axel

1st Young rider classification

2nd Time trial, National Junior Road Championships
2009
1st Overall Driedaagse van Axel
9th Overall Trofeo Karlsberg
2011
3rd Châteauroux Classic
5th Paris–Tours Espoirs
6th Rund um den Finanzplatz Eschborn-Frankfurt
9th Rogaland GP
9th Ronde van Midden-Nederland
2012
10th Ronde van Noord-Holland
2014
10th Overall Olympia's Tour
2015
1st Arno Wallaard Memorial
8th Dwars door Drenthe
2016
1st Sprints classification, Tour of Britain
2018
8th Ronde van Overijssel
10th Ronde van Drenthe
