= 2022 Paris–Roubaix =

Cycling race

2022 UCI World Tour, race 15 of 32
- Event poster with previous winner Sonny Colbrelli

Race details
- Dates: 17 April 2022
- Stages: 1
- Distance: 257.2 km (159.8 mi)
- Winning time: 5h 37' 01"

Results
	Winner	Dylan van Baarle (NED)	(INEOS Grenadiers)
	Second	Wout van Aert (BEL)	(Team Jumbo–Visma)
	Third	Stefan Küng (SUI)	(Groupama–FDJ)

The 2022 Paris–Roubaix was a road cycling one-day race that took place on 17 April 2022 in France. It was the 119th edition of Paris–Roubaix and the 15th event of the 2022 UCI World Tour. The race was won by Dutch rider Dylan van Baarle of Ineos Grenadiers.

== Teams ==
All eighteen UCI WorldTeams and seven UCI ProTeams took part in the race.

UCI WorldTeams

- AG2R Citroën Team
- Astana Qazaqstan Team
- Bora–Hansgrohe
- Cofidis
- EF Education–EasyPost
- Groupama–FDJ
- INEOS Grenadiers
- Intermarché–Wanty–Gobert Matériaux
- Israel–Premier Tech
- Lotto–Soudal
- Movistar Team
- Quick-Step Alpha Vinyl Team
- Team Bahrain Victorious
- Team BikeExchange–Jayco
- Team DSM
- Team Jumbo–Visma
- Trek–Segafredo
- UAE Team Emirates

UCI ProTeams

- Alpecin–Fenix
- Arkéa–Samsic
- B&B Hotels–KTM
- Bingoal Pauwels Sauces WB
- Sport Vlaanderen–Baloise
- Team TotalEnergies
- Uno-X Pro Cycling Team

== Result ==
Result
Rank	Rider	Team	Time
1	Dylan van Baarle (NED)	INEOS Grenadiers	5h 37' 01"
2	Wout van Aert (BEL)	Team Jumbo–Visma	+ 1' 47"
3	Stefan Küng (SUI)	Groupama–FDJ	+ 1' 47"
4	Tom Devriendt (BEL)	Intermarché–Wanty–Gobert Matériaux	+ 1' 47"
5	Matej Mohorič (SLO)	Team Bahrain Victorious	+ 1' 47"
6	Adrien Petit (FRA)	Intermarché–Wanty–Gobert Matériaux	+ 2' 27"
7	Jasper Stuyven (BEL)	Trek–Segafredo	+ 2' 27"
8	Laurent Pichon (FRA)	Arkéa–Samsic	+ 2' 27"
9	Mathieu van der Poel (NED)	Alpecin–Fenix	+ 2' 34"
10	Yves Lampaert (BEL)	Quick-Step Alpha Vinyl Team	+ 2' 59"
