= Dylan van Baarle =

Dutch cyclist (born 1992)

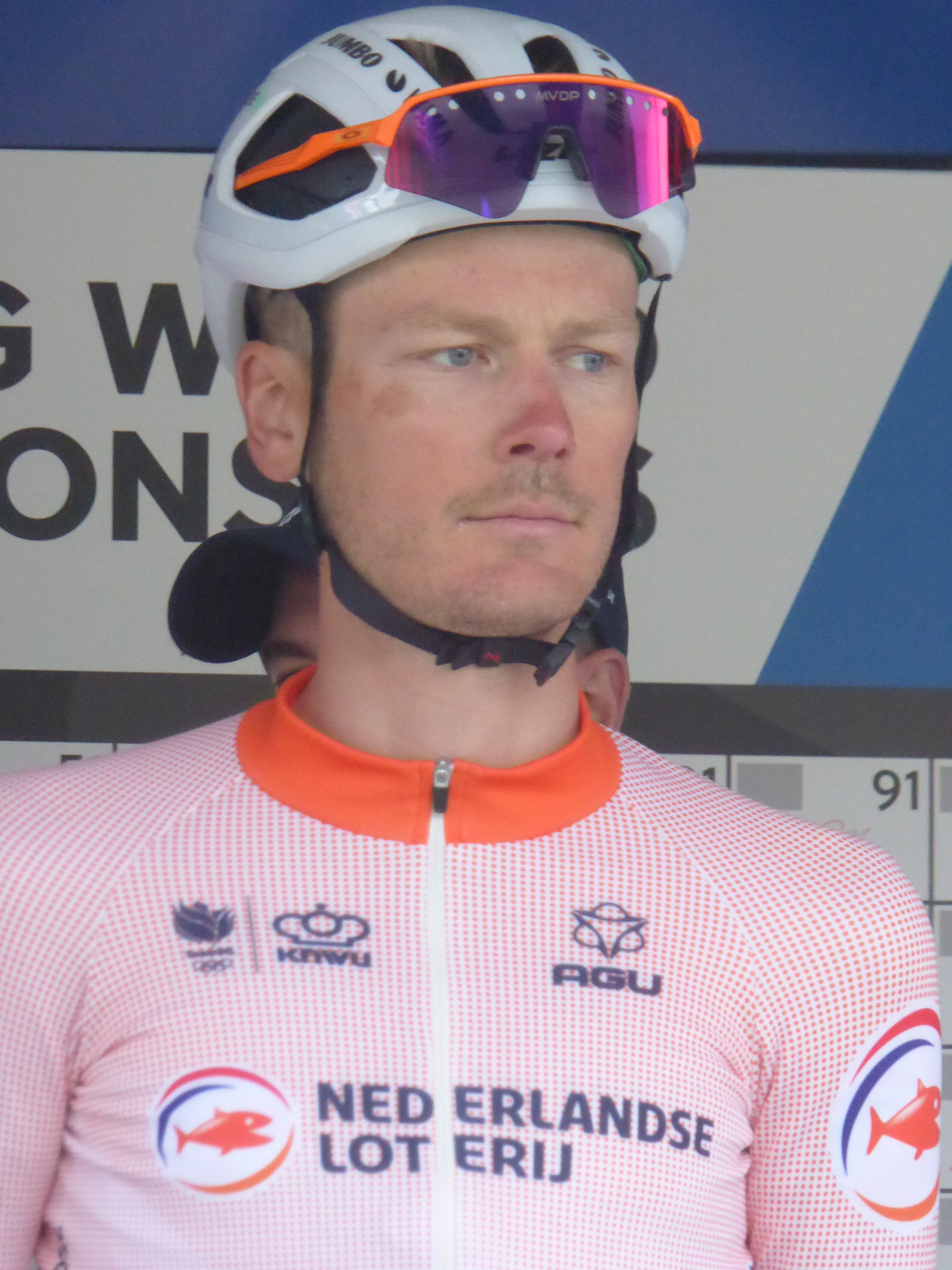
- Van Baarle at the 2023 UCI Road World Championships

Personal information
- Full name: Dylan van Baarle
- Nickname: The Diamond Thief
- Born: 21 May 1992 (age 34) Voorburg, Netherlands
- Height: 1.87 m (6 ft 2 in)
- Weight: 78 kg (172 lb)

Cycling career
- Sport: Cycling
- Current team: Soudal–Quick-Step
- Discipline: Road
- Role: Rider
- Rider type: Classics specialist; Time trialist; Rouleur

Amateur teams
- 2010: Restore Cycling Team
- 2011–2013: Rabobank Continental Team

Professional teams
- 2014–2017: Garmin–Sharp
- 2018–2022: Team Sky
- 2023–2025: Team Jumbo–Visma
- 2026–: Soudal–Quick-Step

Major wins
- Stage races Tour of Britain (2014) One-day races and Classics National Road Race Championships (2023) National Time Trial Championships (2018) Paris–Roubaix (2022) Dwars door Vlaanderen (2021) Omloop Het Nieuwsblad (2023)
Medal record
Representing Netherlands
Men's road cycling
World Championships
Silver medal – second place	2021 Flanders	Road race

Dylan van Baarle (born 21 May 1992) is a Dutch professional road racing cyclist, who rides for UCI WorldTeam Soudal–Quick-Step.

Specialising in classic cycle races, Van Baarle has taken eight wins during his professional career – including victories at the 2021 Dwars door Vlaanderen, 2022 Paris–Roubaix and the 2023 Omloop Het Nieuwsblad. He has also won the 2018 Dutch National Time Trial Championships and the 2023 Dutch National Road Race Championships, and won the silver medal in the road race at the 2021 UCI Road World Championships in Belgium.

== Career ==
=== Junior and amateur career ===
Born in Voorburg, Van Baarle won a stage of the 2009 Trofeo Karlsberg on his way to finishing second overall, and he also finished second in the junior race at the Dutch National Time Trial Championships. The following year, he finished third overall at the Driedaagse van Axel. Ageing out of juniors for the 2011 season, Van Baarle joined the Rabobank Continental Team, and was part of the team that won the team time trial stage at that year's Vuelta Ciclista a León. He took his first individual victory with the team at the 2012 Le Triptyque des Monts et Châteaux, where he won the stage 2a individual time trial. Over the next couple of months, Van Baarle won the Arno Wallaard Memorial, before winning the opening prologue stage of the Olympia's Tour in Zandvoort. He ultimately won the race overall, having regained the race lead on the penultimate day when he finished second to Rohan Dennis in a second individual time trial stage; he also won the points and young rider classifications.

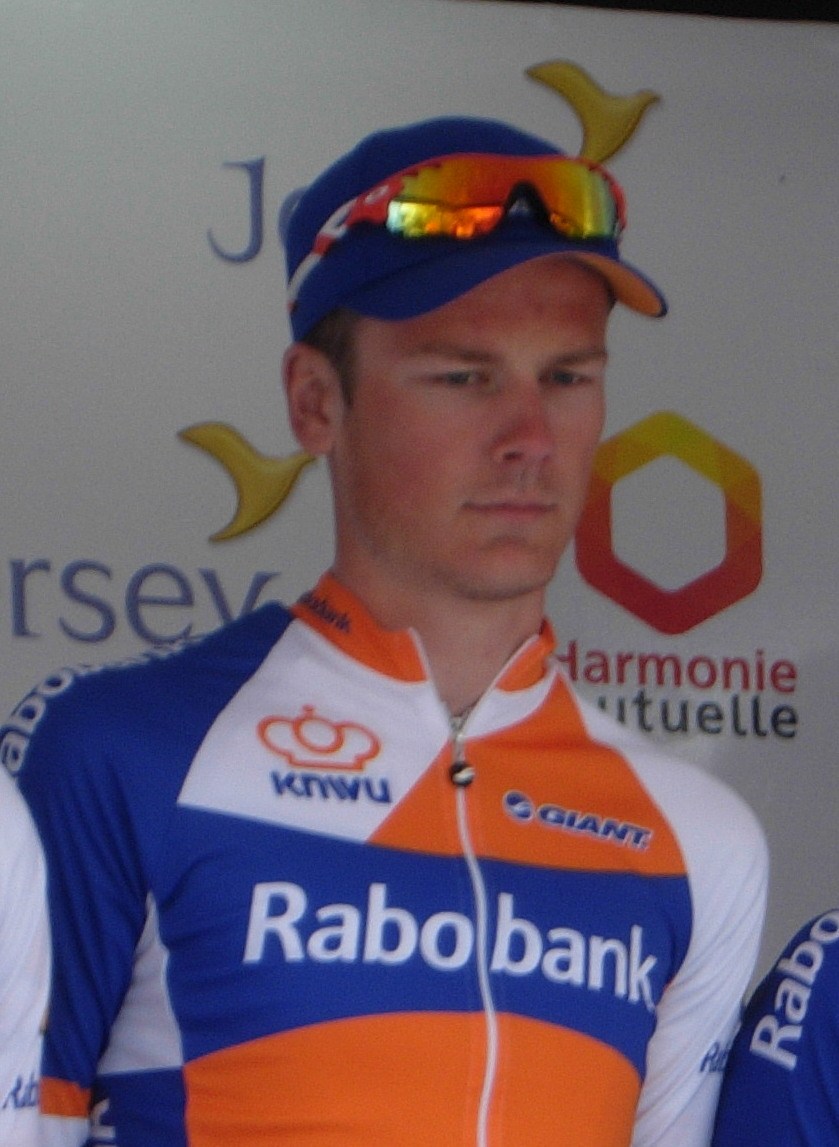
Van Baarle at the 2013 Tour de Bretagne, where he won three different classifications

He started the 2013 season with two one-day race victories on successive weekends at the Ster van Zwolle (from a small group) and the Dorpenomloop Rucphen in a solo move. He then finished third overall at the Tour de Normandie, before a fourth-place finish at the Tour de Bretagne. During that race, Van Baarle won the penultimate stage individual time trial, as well as three individual jerseys – for the mountains, sprints and combination classifications. He became the first rider to win successive editions of the Olympia's Tour since Servais Knaven in 1992 and 1993, winning the fourth stage on his way to the general classification victory. He then won the under-23 titles at both the Dutch National Time Trial Championships and the Dutch National Road Race Championships, either side of his overall victory at the Thüringen Rundfahrt der U23. He finished third at the Internationale Wielertrofee Jong Maar Moedig, before placing seventh in the under-23 road race at the UCI Road World Championships in Italy, finishing as part of a small group that sprinted for the bronze medal.

=== Garmin–Sharp (2014–2017) ===
Following a three-year stint with the Rabobank Development Team, Van Baarle signed with Garmin–Sharp, initially for the 2014 and 2015 seasons. In his first race with the team in 2014, he finished tenth at the Dubai Tour. After a sixth-place finish at the Ster ZLM Toer, Van Baarle took his first professional victory later in the season at the Tour of Britain; he gained the yellow jersey on the seventh stage, and successfully defended the jersey across the two stages on the final day. The following year, Van Baarle took a third-place finish at Dwars door Vlaanderen, having been part of a four-rider lead group that formed in the final third of the race. He finished fifth overall at the Bayern Rundfahrt, also winning the young rider classification in the process, before he made his début at the Tour de France. Having signed a two-year contract extension with Cannondale–Garmin until the end of 2017, Van Baarle was unable to defend his Tour of Britain title, finishing the race in eighth place overall.

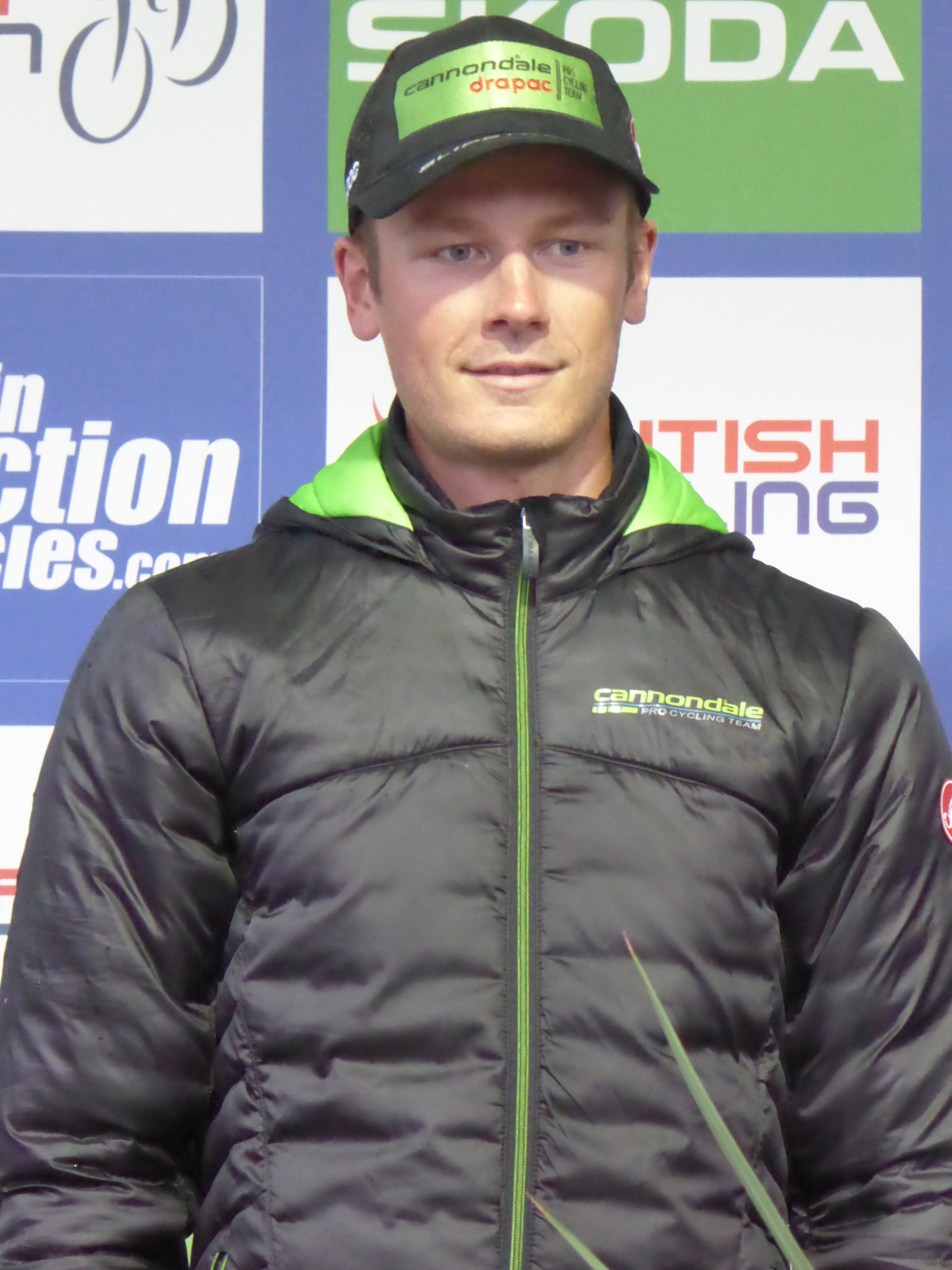
Van Baarle at the 2016 Tour of Britain, where he finished fifth overall – his third successive top-ten finish at the race

Starting his 2016 season at the Vuelta a Mallorca one-day races, Van Baarle recorded a fifth-place finish in the Trofeo Pollença–Port de Andratx, finishing as part of the front group. He finished in sixth place at the Tour of Flanders, having joined the lead group after an attack on the second ascent of the Oude Kwaremont. Another fifth-place finish followed at the Tour of Britain, recording five top-ten stage finishes during the race. In the 2017 classics, Van Baarle finished in the top ten at both Dwars door Vlaanderen (eighth) and E3 Harelbeke (ninth), ahead of the Tour of Flanders. At the Tour of Flanders, Van Baarle was part of the lead group behind solo winner Philippe Gilbert, but was out-sprinted by both Greg Van Avermaet and Niki Terpstra as he finished off the podium in fourth place. He featured in the breakaway during the seventh stage of the Tour de France, but was caught with 6 kilometres (3.7 miles) remaining of the stage; he did, however, win the combativity award for the stage.

=== Team Sky (2018–2022) ===
Out of contract at the end of the 2017 season, Van Baarle was initially announced as extending with Cannondale–Drapac until the end of 2019, but with the team's uncertain future at the time due to financial issues, Van Baarle ultimately joined Team Sky on an initial two-year deal from 2018.

==== 2018 ====
He took his first victory for the team when he won the Dutch National Time Trial Championships in June, finishing 30 seconds clear of the next closest competitor in Bergen op Zoom. He placed tenth in the time trial at the UEC European Road Championships in Glasgow, and also finished fifth overall at the BinckBank Tour. He made his début at the Vuelta a España, where he finished second from the breakaway on stage twelve, but was involved in a crash with a member of the race organisation post-stage, which ultimately forced his withdrawal from the race a few days later.

==== 2019–2020 ====
Taking aim at the Classics with a new coach, Van Baarle started his 2019 season in Australia, which culminated in him winning the general classification at the Herald Sun Tour, having gained more than two minutes to his main rivals on the penultimate stage. However, he crashed at Omloop Het Nieuwsblad and suffered a broken hand, which ruled him out for almost a month and impacted his preparation for the Tour of Flanders and Paris–Roubaix. Van Baarle took his first victory at UCI World Tour level, winning the final stage of the Critérium du Dauphiné in Champéry, defeating Jack Haig in a two-up sprint. He was unable to defend his Dutch National Time Trial Championships title, finishing third behind Jos van Emden and Sebastian Langeveld, before riding as a domestique for Team INEOS team leader Egan Bernal, as the latter won the team's fifth consecutive Tour de France. He later signed a three-year contract extension with the team, until the end of the 2022 season.

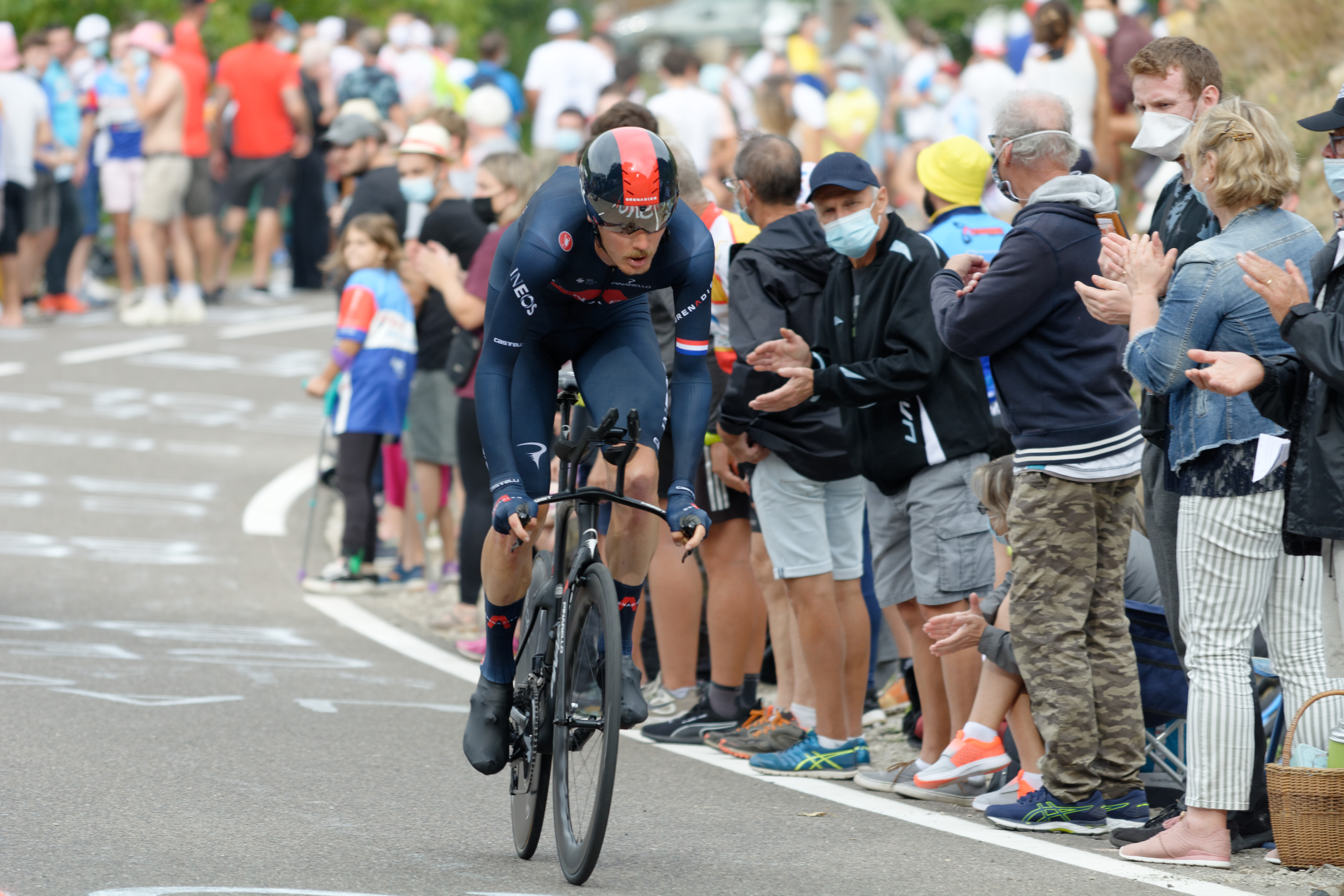
Van Baarle at the 2020 Tour de France

Prior to the COVID-19 pandemic-enforced suspension of racing in 2020, Van Baarle took a pair of fifth-place finishes in his opening block of racing in Australia, at the Tour Down Under and the Cadel Evans Great Ocean Road Race. Towards the end of the season, Van Baarle took another top-ten finish at the Tour of Flanders with eighth place, before riding the Vuelta a España, where he featured in two stage breakaways and finished fourth in the latter of these, on stage fourteen.

==== 2021 ====
Van Baarle finished in the first chase group at both the E3 Saxo Bank Classic and Gent–Wevelgem, finishing the races in seventh and eighth respectively. He followed this up with his first one-day classics victory, when he won Dwars door Vlaanderen from a 50-kilometre (31-mile) solo move, having attacked out of a seven-rider lead group. He was seen to be an outsider for the Tour of Flanders, and he finished as the highest-placed rider from the INEOS Grenadiers in tenth position. He featured in breakaways on three stages at the Tour de France and also on stage ten at the Vuelta a España, finishing fourth in Spain; he later fractured his pelvis in a crash, and ultimately withdrew from the race. He was part of the Dutch team for the road race at the UCI Road World Championships in Belgium, where it was thought he would be a key domestique for team leader Mathieu van der Poel. However, it was Van Baarle that placed highest, winning the silver medal from a group sprint of four riders, behind solo winner Julian Alaphilippe.

==== 2022 ====
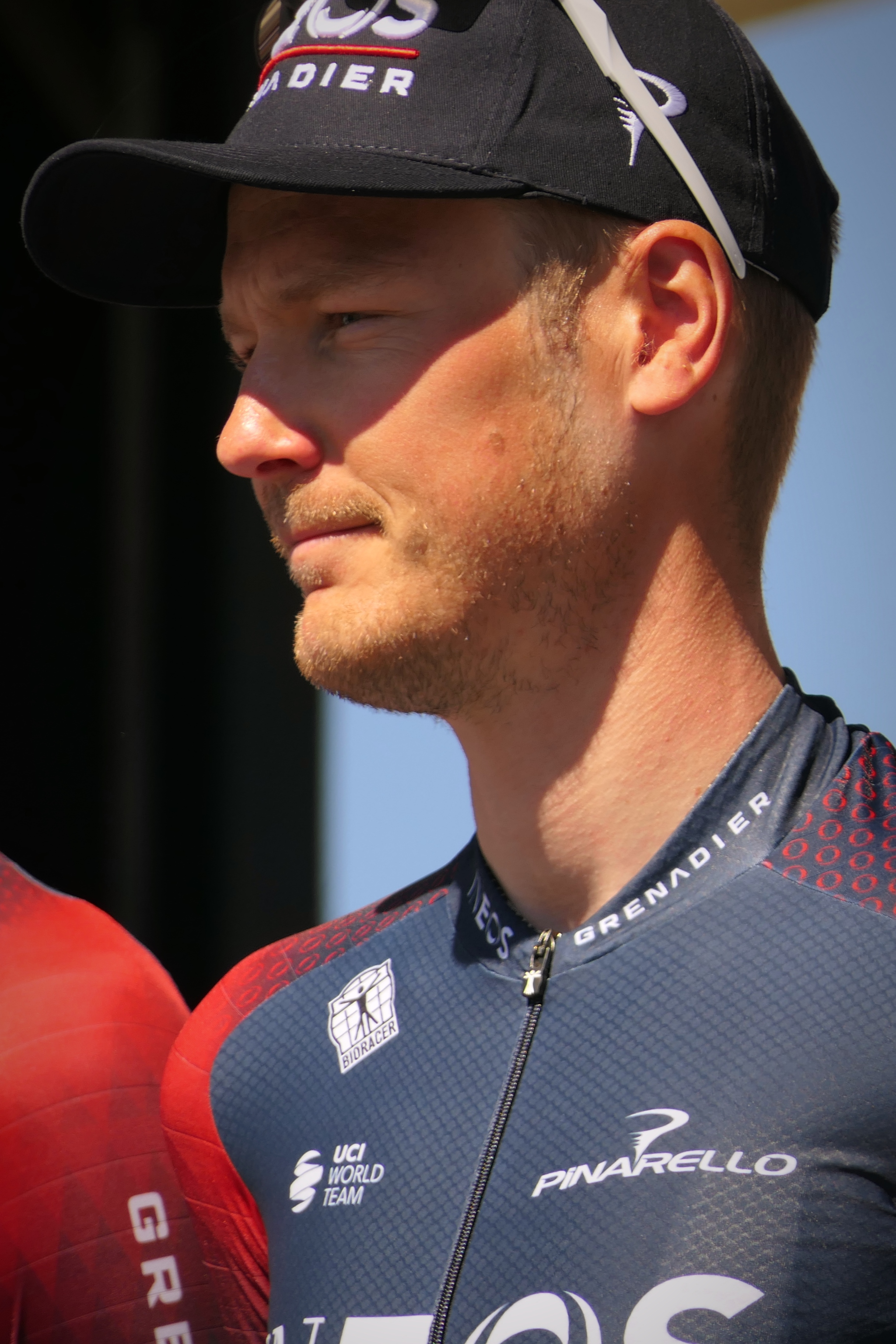
Van Baarle prior to the 2022 Paris–Roubaix, where he won his first cycling monument

Van Baarle again finished in the top ten positions at the E3 Saxo Bank Classic, finishing eighth, before taking his first podium finish in a cycling monument, with a second-place result at the Tour of Flanders. Van Baarle had attacked with Fred Wright at approximately 50 kilometres (31 miles) remaining, before being joined by Mathieu van der Poel, Tadej Pogačar and Valentin Madouas on the final ascent of the Taaienberg. After an attack by Van der Poel and Pogačar on the last climb of the Oude Kwaremont, Van Baarle and Madouas were able to catch up to the pair in the closing kilometres, but Van der Poel was able to win the sprint finish in Oudenaarde. Van Baarle then won the fastest Paris–Roubaix to be held at the time; he attacked from the main group on the cobbles between Auchy-lez-Orchies and Bersée, forcing a reaction from the main race favourites, before bridging to the lead group at Cysoing. Raising the tempo on Camphin-en-Pévèle, Van Baarle made his race-winning solo move on Carrefour de l'Arbre, ultimately winning the race by almost two minutes, the first Dutch win at the race since 2014.

=== Team Jumbo–Visma (2023–2025) ===
==== 2023 ====
Van Baarle joined Team Jumbo–Visma for the 2023 season, having signed a three-year contract with the team. In his first race with the team, Van Baarle won Omloop Het Nieuwsblad; having gone clear in a group of four riders with 40 kilometres (25 miles) remaining, he dropped his breakaway companions one-by-one and ultimately won by 20 seconds in Ninove. He was unable to retain his Paris–Roubaix title, as he crashed out of the race on the Trouée d'Arenberg, and suffered multiple fractures. After returning to racing at the Critérium du Dauphiné, Van Baarle took his second win of the season when he won his first Dutch National Road Race Championships title, attacking within the final 10 kilometres (6.2 miles) and soloed to victory while his teammate Olav Kooij countered chases by Mathieu van der Poel behind. Van Baarle later assisted Van der Poel to his victory in the road race at the UCI Road World Championships in Scotland, on a course that he described as a "glorified criterium". He was also part of Grand Tour overall wins by Jonas Vingegaard at the Tour de France and Sepp Kuss at the Vuelta a España.

==== 2024 ====
By contrast, Van Baarle only contested ten races during the 2024 season. He missed Paris–Roubaix in April due to illness, and did not return to racing until June's Critérium du Dauphiné, where he then crashed out of the race on stage five, fracturing his collarbone as a result. After missing a further two months of racing, Van Baarle raced the Vuelta a España and withdrew from the race on stage two after a crash – fracturing his hip – and ultimately ending his season.

==== 2025 ====
Van Baarle started his 2025 season at the Tour Down Under, where he crashed during the final phase of the first stage and did not finish. He later rode the Giro d'Italia, finishing 95th overall while riding in support of teammate Simon Yates, who won the race. In June, he finished second to Daan Hoole at the Dutch National Time Trial Championships, beaten by 20 seconds in Surhuisterveen. Van Baarle also competed in the Vuelta a España, finishing 130th overall while riding in support of teammate Jonas Vingegaard, who won the race. In August, it was announced that Van Baarle would leave Team Visma | Lease a Bike at the end of the season to join Soudal–Quick-Step, signing a contract through 2027.

=== Soudal–Quick-Step (2026–present) ===
==== 2026 ====
Van Baarle made his Soudal–Quick-Step and season debut at the Volta ao Algarve in February. He finished tenth on the final stage to Alto do Malhão and placed 26th overall in the general classification.

== Personal life ==
Van Baarle's father Mario van Baarle and younger sister Ashlynn van Baarle have both competed as professional cyclists. He lives in Monaco with his partner Pauline Ferrand-Prévot, who rides for the women's Visma–Lease a Bike team and won the 2025 Tour de France Femmes.

== Major results ==
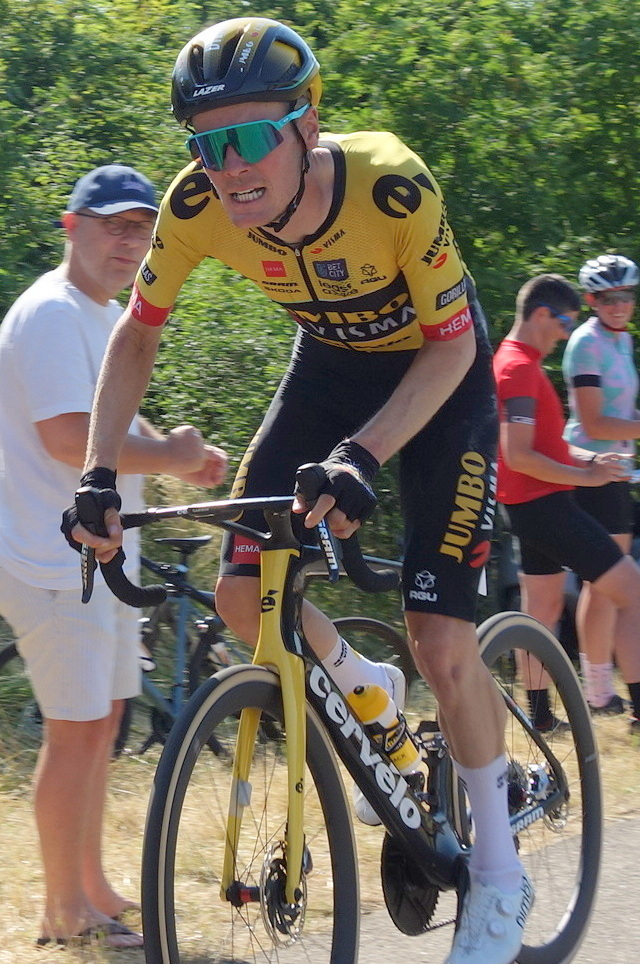
Van Baarle at the 2023 Dutch National Road Race Championships, where he won the national road race title for the first time

=== Road ===
2009
2nd Time trial, National Junior Championships
2nd Overall Trofeo Karlsberg

1st Stage 3 (ITT)

2010
3rd Overall Driedaagse van Axel
2011
1st Stage 2b (TTT) Vuelta Ciclista a León
10th Omloop der Kempen
2012
1st Overall Olympia's Tour

1st Points classification
1st Young rider classification
1st Prologue

1st Arno Wallaard Memorial
1st Stage 1 (TTT) Thüringen Rundfahrt der U23
4th Time trial, National Under-23 Championships
4th Zellik–Galmaarden
4th Dwars door het Hageland
7th Overall Kreiz Breizh Elites
7th Ronde van Midden-Nederland
9th Overall Le Triptyque des Monts et Châteaux

1st Stage 2a (ITT)

9th Overall Tour du Poitou-Charentes
10th Overall Tour de Normandie
2013
National Under-23 Championships

1st Road race
1st Time trial

1st Overall Olympia's Tour

1st Young rider classification
1st Stage 4

1st Overall Thüringen Rundfahrt der U23
1st Ster van Zwolle
1st Dorpenomloop Rucphen
3rd Overall Tour de Normandie
3rd Internationale Wielertrofee Jong Maar Moedig
4th Overall Tour de Bretagne

1st Mountains classification
1st Sprints classification
1st Combination classification
1st Stage 6 (ITT)

5th Münsterland Giro
7th Road race, UCI Under-23 World Championships
8th Overall Le Triptyque des Monts et Châteaux
9th Omloop Het Nieuwsblad U23
10th Paris–Tours Espoirs
2014 (1 pro win)
1st Overall Tour of Britain
5th Time trial, National Championships
6th Overall Ster ZLM Toer
10th Overall Dubai Tour
2015
3rd Dwars door Vlaanderen
5th Overall Bayern Rundfahrt

1st Young rider classification

8th Overall Tour of Britain
2016
5th Overall Tour of Britain
5th Trofeo Pollença–Port de Andratx
6th Tour of Flanders
2017
4th Tour of Flanders
8th Dwars door Vlaanderen
9th E3 Harelbeke
Combativity award Stage 7 Tour de France
2018 (1)
1st Time trial, National Championships
1st Stage 3 (TTT) Critérium du Dauphiné
5th Overall BinckBank Tour
10th Time trial, UEC European Championships
2019 (2)
1st Overall Herald Sun Tour
1st Stage 8 Critérium du Dauphiné
3rd Time trial, National Championships
6th Overall Settimana Internazionale di Coppi e Bartali
2020
5th Overall Tour Down Under
5th Cadel Evans Great Ocean Road Race
8th Tour of Flanders
2021 (1)
1st Dwars door Vlaanderen
2nd Road race, UCI World Championships
7th E3 Saxo Bank Classic
8th Gent–Wevelgem
10th Tour of Flanders
2022 (1)
1st Paris–Roubaix
2nd Tour of Flanders
8th E3 Saxo Bank Classic
10th Overall Volta ao Algarve
2023 (2)
1st Road race, National Championships
1st Omloop Het Nieuwsblad
2025
2nd Time trial, National Championships
2026
2nd Time trial, National Championships

==== Grand Tour general classification results timeline ====
Grand Tour	2014	2015	2016	2017	2018	2019	2020	2021	2022	2023	2024	2025
Giro d'Italia	DNF	—	—	—	—	—	—	—	—	—	—	95
Tour de France	—	147	91	77	—	46	59	54	32	42	—	—
Vuelta a España	—	—	—	—	DNF	—	49	DNF	49	88	DNF	130

==== Classics results timeline ====
Monument	2014	2015	2016	2017	2018	2019	2020	2021	2022	2023	2024	2025
Milan–San Remo	—	—	69	—	99	—	140	31	—	—	—	—
Tour of Flanders	89	37	6	4	12	18	8	10	2	—	83	46
Paris–Roubaix	64	133	16	20	19	21	NH	OTL	1	DNF	DNS	35
Liège–Bastogne–Liège	Has not contested during his career											
Giro di Lombardia	Has not contested during his career											
Classic	2014	2015	2016	2017	2018	2019	2020	2021	2022	2023	2024	2025
Omloop Het Nieuwsblad	—	—	—	81	51	14	—	—	—	1	34	—
Kuurne–Brussels–Kuurne	—	—	—	—	70	DNS	—	—	—	35	47	—
E3 Harelbeke	58	24	19	9	51	—	NH	7	8	DNF	88	65
Gent–Wevelgem	45	DNF	DNF	97	99	—	—	8	41	—	—	—
Dwars door Vlaanderen	45	3	—	8	—	53	NH	1	71	—	—	23

==== Major championship results timeline ====
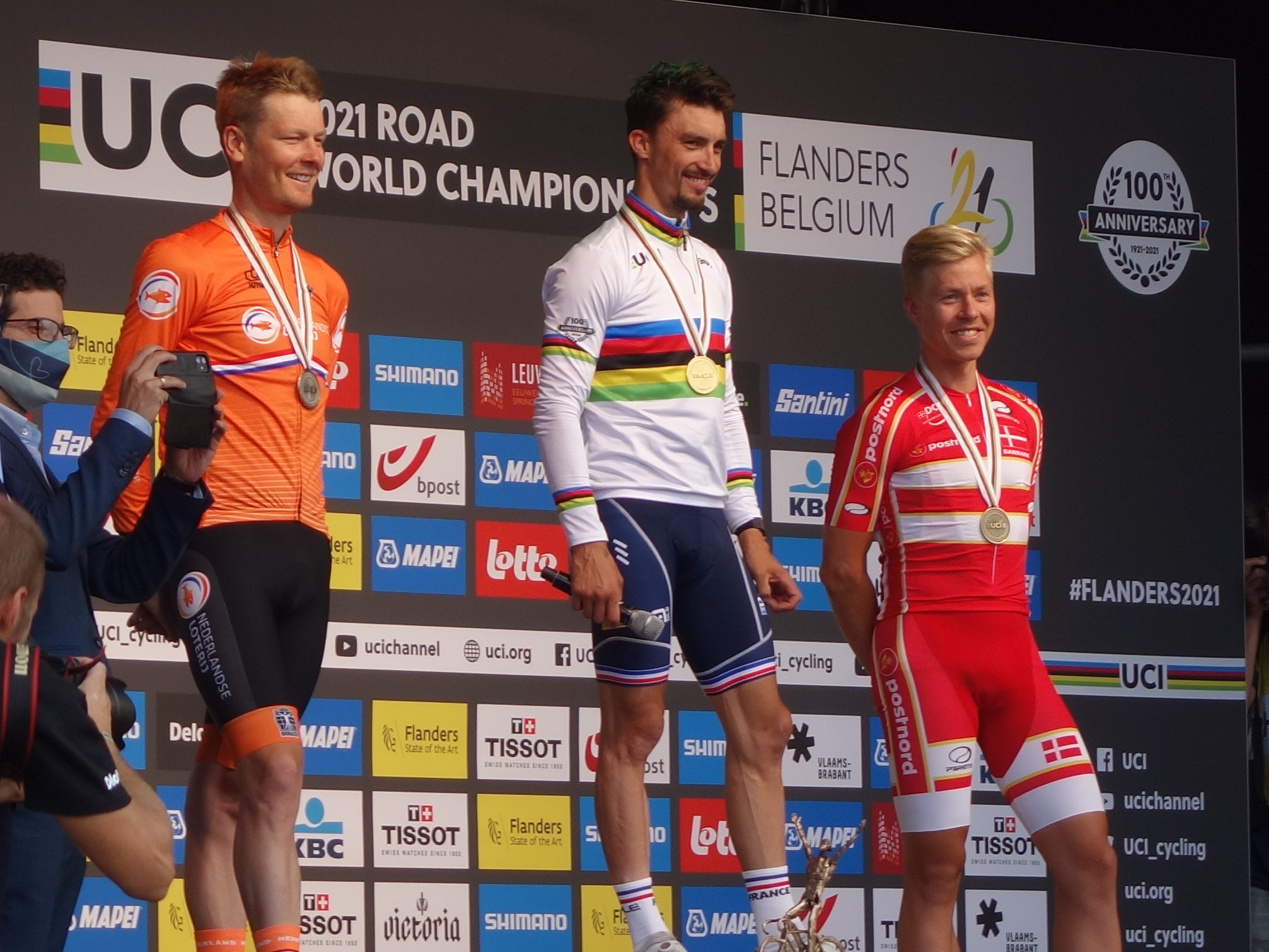
Van Baarle (left) on the podium, having won the silver medal in the road race at the 2021 UCI Road World Championships in Belgium

Event		2014	2015	2016	2017	2018	2019	2020	2021	2022	2023	2024	2025
Olympic Games	Road race	Not held		—	Not held				15	Not held		36	NH
World Championships	Time trial	—	—	—	—	—	15	—	—	—	—	—	
World Championships	Road race	DNF	96	48	—	—	DNF	35	2	27	12	—	
European Championships	Time trial	—	—	—	—	10	—	—	—	—	—	—	
European Championships	Road race	—	—	—	—	DNF	26	—	—	—	—	—	
National Championships	Time trial	5	9	—	—	1	3	—	—	—	—	—	2
National Championships	Road race	29	61	11	7	19	—	—	—	—	1	—	152

Legend
—	Did not compete
DNF	Did not finish
DNS	Did not start
NH	Not held
IP	In progress
OTL	Outside time limit

=== Track ===
2010
3rd Madison, National Championships (with Nick Stöpler)
2012
2nd Madison, National Championships (with Michael Vingerling)
2014
1st Madison, National Championships (with Yoeri Havik)
2015
1st Madison, National Championships (with Yoeri Havik)
2017
3rd Six Days of Rotterdam (with Wim Stroetinga)
