= NFTO (cycling team) =

British cycling team

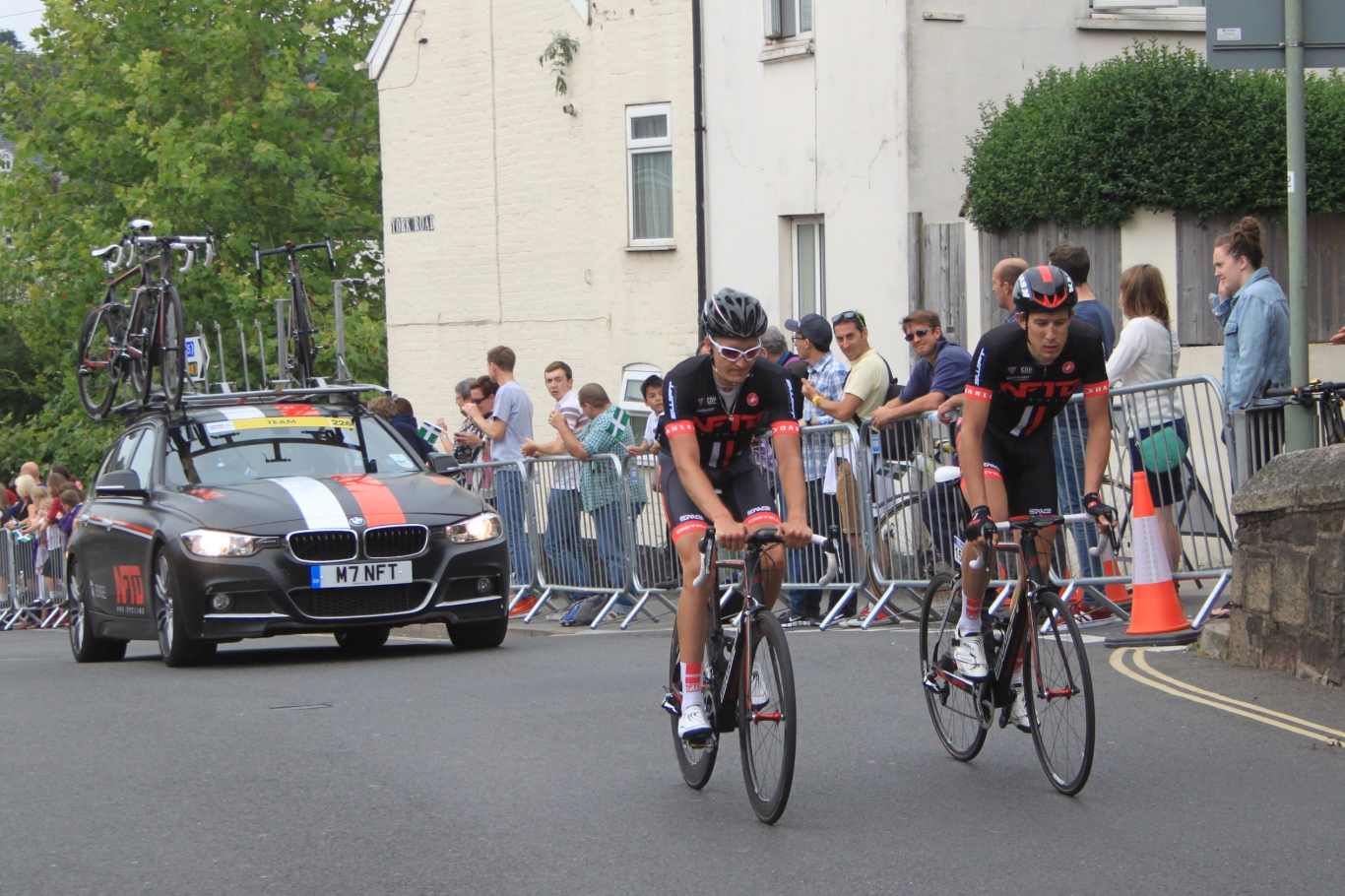

Team information
- UCI code: NPC
- Registered: United Kingdom
- Founded: 2014
- Disbanded: 2016
- Discipline: Road
- Status: UCI Continental
- Bicycles: Swift/Felt
- Website: Team home page

Key personnel
- Team manager: Tom Barras

Team name history
- 2014–2016: NFTO

NFTO Pro Cycling (UCI team code: NPC) were a British UCI Continental cycling team, until October 2016. According to the team's website, 'NFTO' stands for 'Not For The Ordinary'.

Founded in 2014 the team were planning to become a UCI Professional Continental team in 2016. However this change of status did not occur, and in October of that year it was announced that the team's sponsor would cease to support the team, and that the team's manager Tom Barras would set up a successor team with UCI Continental status. In December Barras confirmed that the new team would not race after the squad's prospective sponsor pulled out.

== Major wins ==
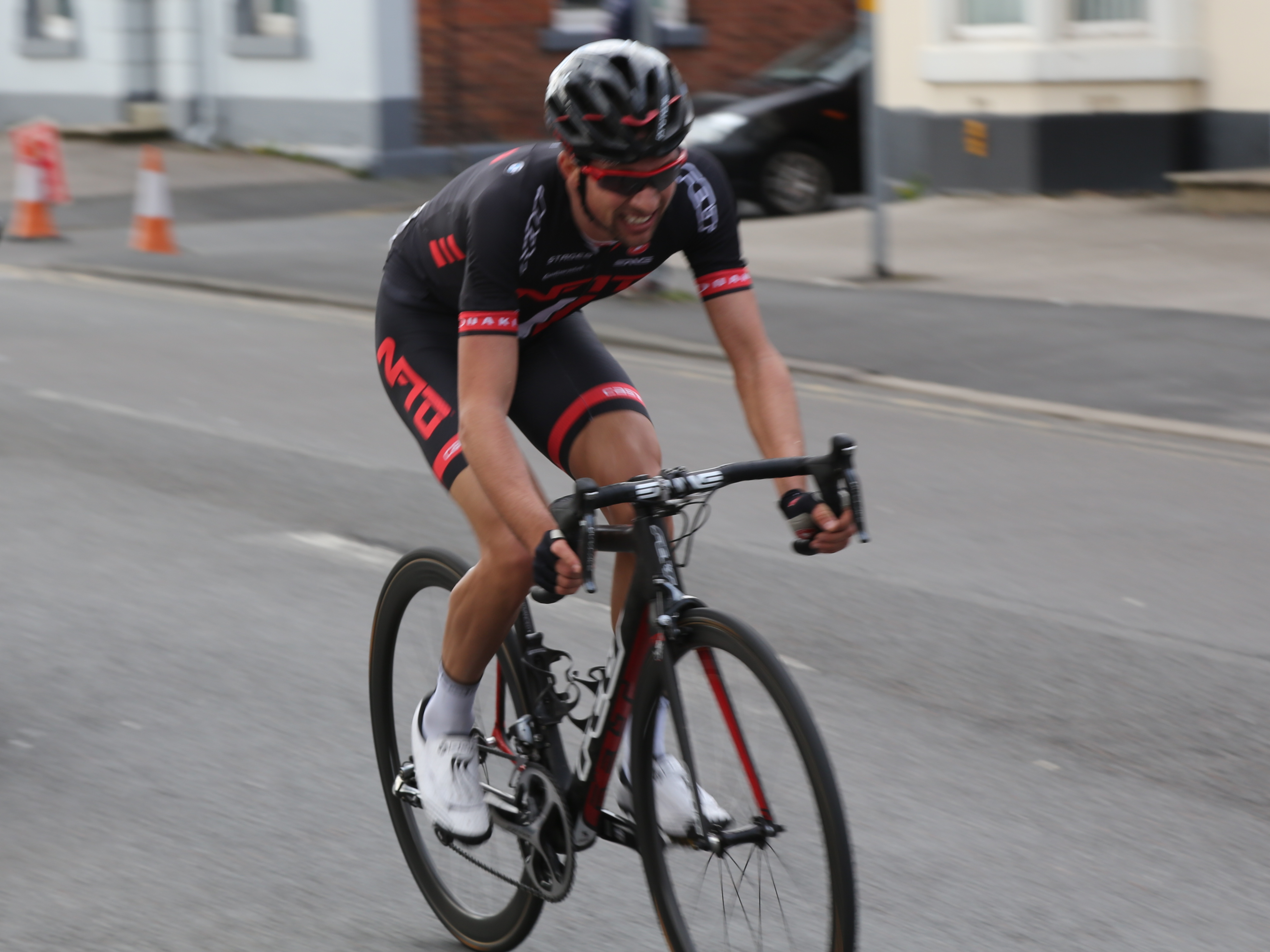
Ian Bibby, shortly before winning the Chorley Grand Prix on 4 April 2015

2014
Prudential RideLondon, Adam Blythe
Overall Totnes - Vire, James Lewis

Stage 1, James Lewis

Overall Tour Series Sprint classification, Jon Mould

Stoke-on-Trent, Jon Mould

Sprints classification, Jon Mould

Durham, Jon Mould

Sprints classification, Jon Mould

Edinburgh, Jon Mould

Sprints classification, Jon Mould

Woking Sprints classification, Jon Mould

Otley Criterium (Elite Circuit Series), Adam Blythe
Grand Prix of Poland Points race, Jon Mould
Stockton GP, Russell Downing
2015
Jock Wadley Memorial Road Race, Steele Von Hoff
Stage 4 Tour Down Under, Steele Von Hoff
Duncan Sparrow Road Race, Tom Barras
Capernwray Road Race, Ian Bibby
Rutland–Melton CiCLE Classic, Steele Von Hoff
Chorley GP, Ian Bibby
Stage 6 Rás Tailteann, Ian Bibby

== National champions ==
2014
British National Circuit Championships, Adam Blythe
2015
Australian National Criterium Championships, Steele Von Hoff

== Team roster ==
As of 18 April 2015

Rider	Date of birth
Dale Appleby (GBR)	9 December 1986 (age 39)
Tom Barras (GBR)	21 June 1978 (age 48)
Ian Bibby (GBR)	20 December 1986 (age 39)
Edmund Bradbury (GBR)	10 September 1992 (age 34)
Eddie Dunbar (IRL)	1 September 1996 (age 30)
Sam Harrison (GBR)	24 June 1992 (age 34)
Justin Hoy (GBR)	27 September 1978 (age 48)
James Lewis (GBR)	1 November 1990 (age 36)
Rhys Lloyd (GBR)	23 January 1989 (age 37)

Rider	Date of birth
James Lowsley-Williams (GBR)	12 January 1992 (age 34)
Richard Mardle (GBR)	9 December 1980 (age 45)
Zach May (GBR)	25 July 1995 (age 31)
Jonathan McEvoy (GBR)	2 August 1989 (age 37)
Matthew Rowe (GBR)	24 April 1988 (age 38)
Rob Partridge (GBR)	11 September 1985 (age 41)
Steele Von Hoff (AUS)	31 December 1987 (age 38)
Hugh Wilson (GBR)	18 April 1987 (age 39)
Joe Wiltshire (GBR)	1 March 1996 (age 30)
