= Vlasman Cycling Team =

Dutch cycling team

Team information
- UCI code: VLA
- Registered: Netherlands
- Founded: 2017
- Disbanded: 2020
- Discipline: Road
- Status: UCI Continental (2018–2020)

Team name history
- 2017–2020: Vlasman Cycling Team

Vlasman Cycling Team was a Dutch cycling team active from 2017 to 2020. After competing domestically in their first year, the team gained UCI Continental status in 2018.

== Team roster ==
As of 31 May 2020.

Rider	Date of birth
Björn Bakker (NED)	11 July 1993 (age 33)
Jasper Bovenhuis (NED)	27 July 1991 (age 35)
Hartthijs de Vries (NED)	11 July 1996 (age 30)
Yoeri Havik (NED)	19 February 1991 (age 35)
Gerben Mos (NED)	29 November 1991 (age 34)
Arne Peters (NED)	23 October 1995 (age 30)

Rider	Date of birth
Wiebe Scholten (NED)	20 December 1996 (age 29)
Remco Schouten (NED)	6 March 1995 (age 31)
Wim Stroetinga (NED)	23 May 1985 (age 41)
Melvin van Zijl (NED)	10 December 1991 (age 34)
Jelle Wolsink (NED)	11 November 1995 (age 30)
