= Edmund Bradbury =

British cyclist

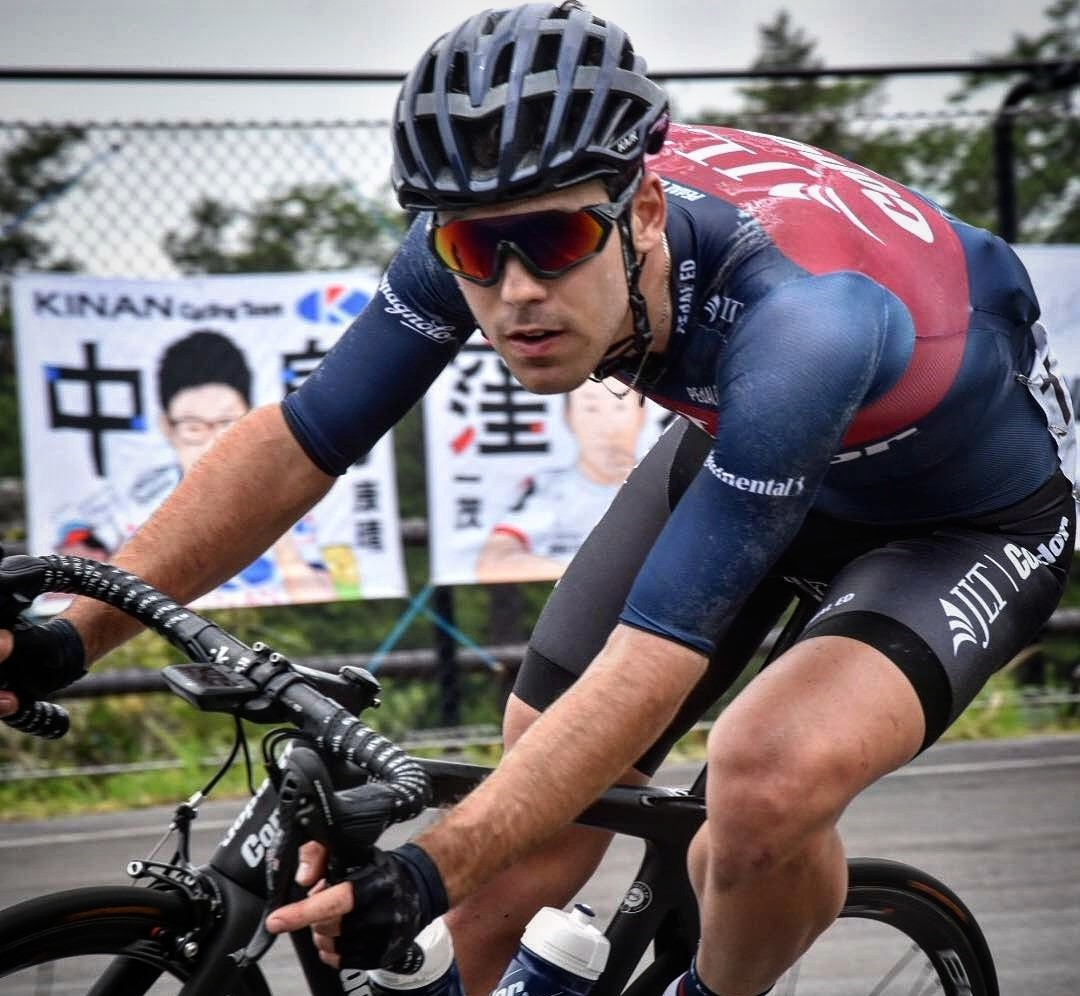
- Bradbury in the 2018 Tour of Japan

Personal information
- Full name: Edmund James Bradbury
- Born: 10 September 1992 (age 34) Surrey, England

Cycling career
- Sport: Cycling
- Current team: Sigma Sports–Cannondale RT
- Discipline: Road
- Role: Rider

Amateur teams
- 2020: Pearson Cycles
- 2021–: Nuun–Sigma Sports–London Race Team

Professional teams
- 2015–2016: NFTO
- 2017–2018: JLT–Condor
- 2019: Memil Pro Cycling

Edmund Bradbury (born 10 September 1992) is a British cyclist who retired from professional riding in 2020. He attended the University of Cambridge where he studied Natural Sciences and Management Studies. He signed his first professional contract in his final year of university and rode professionally between 2015 and 2019 for the NFTO, JLT–Condor and Memil Pro Cycling teams. Since retiring he has ridden for amateur teams including Sigma Sports–Cannondale RT.

== Major results ==
2015
2nd British National Time Trial – Elite Male, National Road Championships
2016
1st Chorley Grand Prix – British Cycling Motorpoint Spring Cup
21st GC Tour of Britain
2018
17th GC Tour de Yorkshire
2019
1st Mountains classification Tour of Xingtai
2nd Overall Tour du Maroc
7th Overall Tour de Taiwan
