= Cycling at the 2019 Pan American Games – Men's road race =

Men's road race at the 2019 Pan American Games
- Venue: Circuito San Miguel
- Dates: August 10
- Competitors: 50 from 18 nations
- Winning time: 4:06:28

Medalists
Gold medal	Maximiliano Richeze	Argentina
Silver medal	Ignacio Prado	Mexico
Bronze medal	Bryan Gómez	Colombia

The men's road race competition of the cycling events at the 2019 Pan American Games was held on August 10 at the Circuito San Miguel.

== Schedule ==
Date	Time	Round
August 10, 2019	13:00	Final

== Results ==
50 riders from 18 countries was started

Rank	Rider	Nation	Time
1st place, gold medalist(s)	Maximiliano Richeze	Argentina	4:06:28
2nd place, silver medalist(s)	Ignacio Prado	Mexico	4:06:28
3rd place, bronze medalist(s)	Bryan Gómez	Colombia	4:06:28
4	Christofer Jurado	Panama	4:06:28
5	Jhonatan Narváez	Ecuador	4:06:28
6	Alonso Gamero	Peru	4:06:29
7	José Luis Rodríguez Aguilar	Chile	4:06:29
8	Manuel Rodas	Guatemala	4:06:47
9	Tomás Contte	Argentina	4:07:15
10	Alain Quispe	Peru	4:07:21
11	Orluis Aular	Venezuela	4:08:13
12	Juan Esteban Arango	Colombia	4:08:23
13	Yans Arias	Cuba	4:08:37
14	Pablo Mudarra	Costa Rica	4:09:02
15	José Aguirre	Mexico	4:09:02
16	Pablo Alarcón	Chile	4:09:03
17	Dorian Monterroso	Guatemala	4:09:03
18	Brayan Sánchez	Colombia	4:09:03
19	Byron Guamá	Ecuador	4:09:03
20	Royner Navarro	Peru	4:09:03
21	Luis López Nolasco	Honduras	4:09:03
22	Jimmy Montenegro	Ecuador	4:09:05
23	Jefferson Alexander Cepeda	Ecuador	4:09:06
24	Pablo Anchieri	Uruguay	4:09:18
25	Ivan Carbajal	Mexico	4:09:18
26	André Gonzáles	Peru	4:09:19
27	Rodrigo Nascimento	Brazil	4:09:19
28	Brandon Rivera	Colombia	4:09:20
29	Jhonathan de Leon	Guatemala	4:09:20
30	Wellinton Canela	Dominican Republic	4:09:21
31	Geovanny García	Dominican Republic	4:09:26
32	René Corella	Mexico	4:09:26
33	Pedro Portuondo	Cuba	4:09:26
34	Nicolás Tivani	Argentina	4:09:27
35	Felipe Peñaloza	Chile	4:09:50
36	Diego Ferreyra	Chile	4:09:50
37	Hidalgo Vera	Cuba	4:30:19
	Magno Nazaret	Brazil	DNF
	Ralph Monsalve	Venezuela	DNF
	Akil Campbell	Trinidad and Tobago	DNF
	Tyler Cole	Trinidad and Tobago	DNF
	Hillard Cijntje	Aruba	DNF
	Junior Marte	Dominican Republic	DNF
	Maximo Rojas	Venezuela	DNF
	Kemp Orosco	Trinidad and Tobago	DNF
	Rubén Ramos	Argentina	DNF
	Frank Sosa	Cuba	DNF
	Clever Martinez	Venezuela	DNF
	Trevor Bailey	Saint Vincent and the Grenadines	DNF
	Jovian Gomez	Trinidad and Tobago	DNF
