= Sebastián Novoa =

Ecuadorian cyclist

Personal information
- Full name: Leonidas Sebastián Novoa Pavón
- Born: 6 November 1992 (age 33)

Cycling career
- Sport: Cycling
- Current team: Team C & S Technology
- Discipline: Road
- Role: Rider

Amateur teams
- 2017: Giant Ecuador
- 2019: Shimano Ecuador
- 2024–: C & S Technology

Professional teams
- 2014: Team Ecuador
- 2020–2023: Best PC Ecuador
Medal record
Men's road bicycle racing
Representing Ecuador
Pan American Championships
Silver medal – second place	2022 San Juan	Road race
Bronze medal – third place	2021 Santo Domingo	Road race

Leonidas Sebastián Novoa Pavón (born 6 November 1992) is an Ecuadorian road cyclist, who currently rides for club team Team C & S Technology.

== Major results ==
2012
1st Stage 3 (TTT) Vuelta al Ecuador
2014
4th Road race, National Road Championships
2019
1st Stage 1 Vuelta al Ecuador
2021
1st Stage 3 Vuelta al Ecuador
3rd Road race, Pan American Road Championships
3rd Time trial, National Road Championships
2022
2nd Road race, Pan American Road Championships
