= Segundo Navarrete =

Ecuadorian cyclist

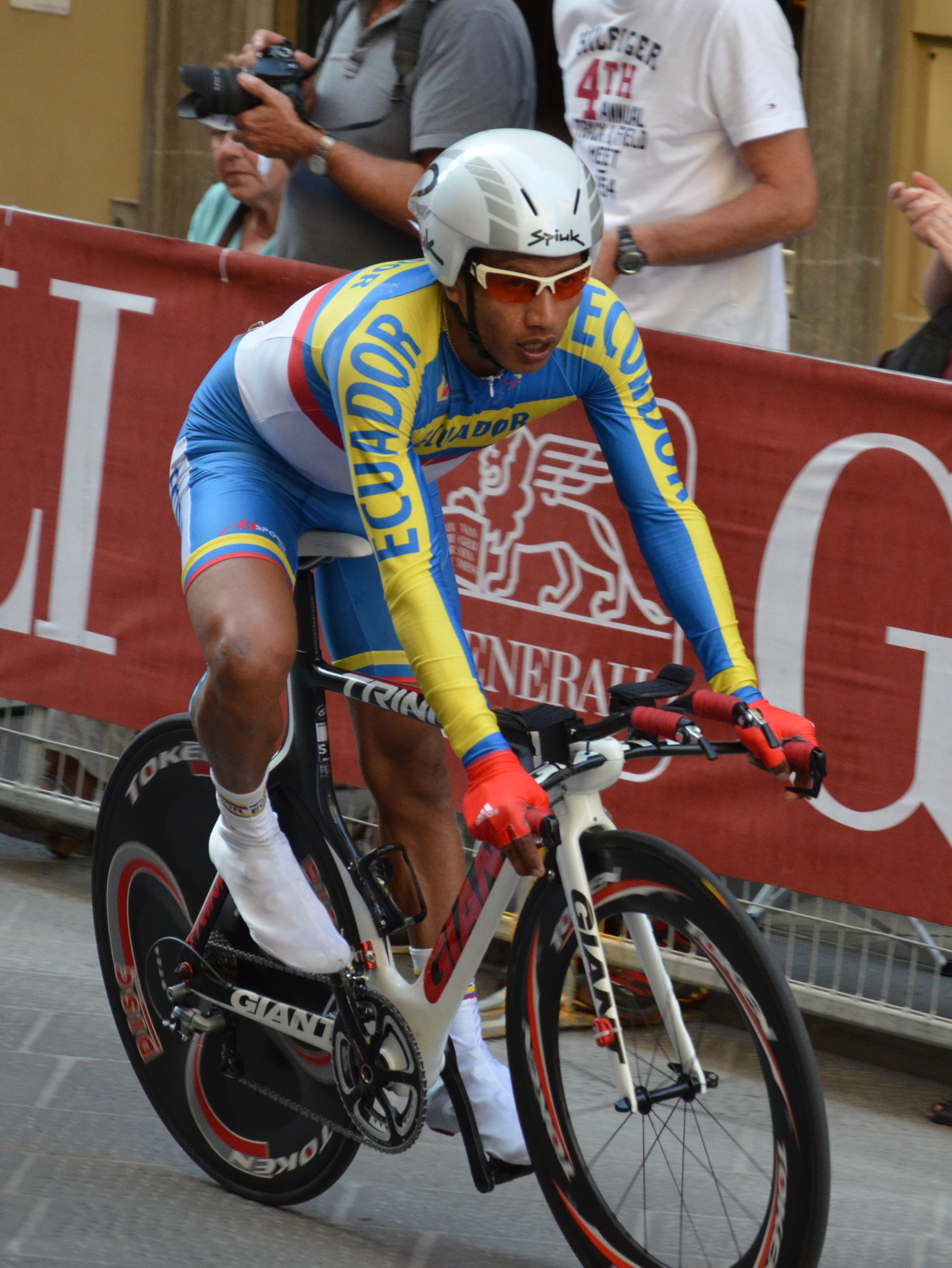
- Navarrete in 2013

Personal information
- Full name: Segundo Mesías Navarrete Navarrete
- Born: 21 May 1985 (age 41) San Gabriel, Ecuador

Cycling career
- Sport: Cycling
- Current team: Saitel
- Discipline: Road
- Role: Rider

Amateur teams
- 2013: RPM Ecuador
- 2016: Power Cycling
- 2017: Giant Ecuador
- 2018–2019: Tims Eagle Bike
- 2021: Movistar Team Ecuador
- 2022–: Saitel

Professional teams
- 2014–2015: Team Ecuador
- 2020: Movistar Team Ecuador
Medal record
Men's road bicycle racing
Representing Ecuador
Pan American Championships
Bronze medal – third place	2013 Zacatecas	Road race
Bronze medal – third place	2019 Ixmiquilpan	Road race

Segundo Mesías Navarrete Navarrete (born 21 May 1985) is an Ecuadorian racing cyclist, who rides for Ecuadorian amateur team Saitel. He rode at the 2014 UCI Road World Championships.

== Major results ==
2003
9th Road race, Pan American Junior Road Championships
2004
Pan American Under-23 Road Championships

6th Time trial
8th Road race

2007
1st Time trial, National Road Championships
1st Stage 6 Vuelta al Ecuador
2008
4th Overall Vuelta a Guatemala
4th Overall Vuelta al Ecuador
2009
1st Time trial, National Road Championships
2nd Overall Vuelta al Ecuador
7th Overall Vuelta a Guatemala
2010
1st Time trial, National Road Championships
8th Overall Vuelta a Bolivia

1st Stage 7

9th Overall Vuelta al Ecuador
2011
2nd Time trial, National Road Championships
2nd Overall Vuelta a Bolivia

1st Stage 8a (ITT)

6th Road race, Pan American Games
2012
3rd Overall Vuelta al Ecuador

1st Prologue, Stage 3 (TTT) & 9

9th Overall Vuelta a la Independencia Nacional

1st Stage 6

2013
1st Stage 7 Vuelta a Guatemala
2nd Time trial, Bolivarian Games
Pan American Road Championships

3rd Road race
4th Time trial

2014
National Road Championships

2nd Road race
3rd Time trial

Pan American Road Championships

5th Time trial
6th Road race

2015
National Road Championships

2nd Time trial
4th Road race

Pan American Road Championships

7th Road race
7th Time trial

2016
1st Time trial, National Road Championships
2018
National Road Championships

4th Road race
4th Time trial

2019
National Road Championships

2nd Time trial
5th Road race

3rd Road race, Pan American Road Championships
2021
National Road Championships

2nd Time trial
3rd Road race

8th Overall Vuelta al Ecuador
