= Cycling at the 2015 Pan American Games – Men's road race =

Men's road race at the 2015 Pan American Games
- Venue: Exhibition Place
- Dates: July 25
- Competitors: 43 from 16 nations
- Winning time: 3:46:26

Medalists
| Gold medal | Miguel Ubeto | Venezuela |
| Silver medal | Eric Marcotte | United States |
| Bronze medal | Guillaume Boivin | Canada |

The men's road race competition of the cycling events at the 2015 Pan American Games was held on July 25 in the streets of Downtown Toronto and High Park with the start and finish being at Exhibition Place.

== Schedule ==
All times are Eastern Standard Time (UTC−3).

| Date | Time | Round |
|---|---|---|
| July 25, 2015 | 16:05 | Final |

== Results ==
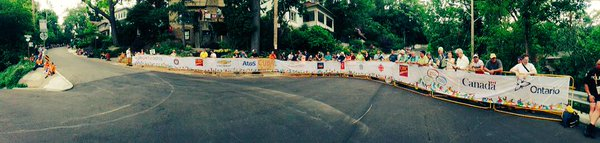
The cycling road race venue

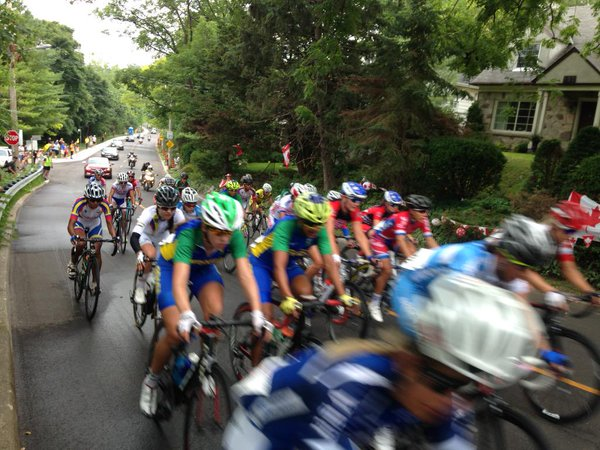
The men's road race during the 2015 Pan American Games

| Rank | Rider | Nation | Time |
|---|---|---|---|
| 1st place, gold medalist(s) | Miguel Ubeto | Venezuela | 3:46:26 |
| 2nd place, silver medalist(s) | Eric Marcotte | United States | 3:46:26 |
| 3rd place, bronze medalist(s) | Guillaume Boivin | Canada | 3:46:26 |
| 4 | Mauro Richeze | Argentina | 3:46:26 |
| 5 | Thiago Nardin | Brazil | 3:46:33 |
| 6 | Enrique Diaz Cedeño | Venezuela | 3:46:34 |
| 7 | Byron Guamá | Ecuador | 3:46:35 |
| 8 | Emile Abraham | Trinidad and Tobago | 3:46:35 |
| 9 | Fernando Gaviria | Colombia | 3:46:35 |
| 10 | Diego Milán | Dominican Republic | 3:46:35 |
| 11 | Xavier Quevedo | Venezuela | 3:46:35 |
| 12 | Efren Ortega | Puerto Rico | 3:46:35 |
| 13 | João Gaspar | Brazil | 3:46:35 |
| 14 | Alfredo Ajpacajá | Guatemala | 3:46:36 |
| 15 | Manuel Rodas | Guatemala | 3:46:36 |
| 16 | Luis Fernando Sepúlveda | Chile | 3:46:36 |
| 17 | Juan Magallanes | Mexico | 3:46:36 |
| 18 | Hugo Houle | Canada | 3:46:36 |
| 19 | Ignacio Prado | Mexico | 3:46:37 |
| 20 | Patricio Almonacid | Chile | 3:46:51 |
| 21 | Christopher Mansilla | Chile | 3:47:17 |
| 22 | José Aguirre | Mexico | 3:47:34 |
| 23 | Ignacio Sarabia | Mexico | 3:47:34 |
| 24 | José Ragonessi | Ecuador | 3:47:34 |
| 25 | Segundo Navarrete | Ecuador | 3:48:54 |
| 26 | Cristian Egidio da Rosa | Brazil | 3:51:10 |
| 27 | Maximiliano Richeze | Argentina | 3:52:04 |
| 28 | William Guzmán | Dominican Republic | 3:52:04 |
| 29 | Alex Cano | Colombia | 3:53:23 |
| 30 | Daniel Jaramillo | Colombia | 3:54:59 |
| | Laureano Rosas | Argentina | DNF |
| | Murilo Ferraz | Brazil | DNF |
| | Jhonathan de Leon | Guatemala | DNF |
| | Gonzalo Garrido | Chile | DNF |
| | Yonder Godoy | Venezuela | DNF |
| | Alonso Gamero | Peru | DNF |
| | Rémi Pelletier-Roy | Canada | DNF |
| | Dominique Mayho | Bermuda | DNF |
| | Sean MacKinnon | Canada | DNF |
| | Royner Navarro | Peru | DNF |
| | Alejandro Durán | Argentina | DNF |
| | Andre Simon | Antigua and Barbuda | DNF |
| | Juan Arango | Colombia | DNS |
