= Jefferson Cepeda =

Jefferson Cepeda is the name of two Ecuadorian cyclists:

- Jefferson Alveiro Cepeda (born 1996)
- Jefferson Alexander Cepeda (born 1998)
