= EF Education–EasyPost =

American professional men's cycling team

Team information
- UCI code: TIA (2005–2006); TSL (2007–2008); GRM (2009–2012); GRS (2012–2014); TCG (2015); CPT (2016); CDT (2016–2017); EFD (2018); EF1 (2019–2020); EFN (2021); EFE (2022–)
- Registered: United States
- Founded: 2003
- Disciplines: Road (2003–present); Track (2003–2006); Gravel (2022-present)
- Status: USA Cycling Club (2003–2004); UCI Continental (2005–2006); UCI Professional Continental (2007–2008); UCI WorldTeam (2009–present)
- Bicycles: Abici (2003); Lemond (2004); Javelin (2005–2006); Felt (2007–2010); Cervélo (2011–2014); Cannondale (2015–present)
- Components: SRAM
- Website: Team home page

Key personnel
- General manager: Jonathan Vaughters
- Team manager: Charly Wegelius

Team name history
2003	5280−Subaru
2004–2006	Team TIAA−CREF
2007	Team Slipstream
2008	Team Slipstream−Chipotle
2008	Team Garmin–Chipotle p/b H30
2009	Team Garmin−Slipstream
2010	Team Garmin−Transitions
2011	Team Garmin−Cervélo
2012	Team Garmin−Barracuda
2012–2014	Garmin−Sharp
2015	Team Cannondale−Garmin
2016	Cannondale Pro Cycling Team
2016–2017	Cannondale–Drapac Pro Cycling Team
2018	Team EF Education First–Drapac p/b Cannondale
2019	EF Education First Pro Cycling
2020	EF Pro Cycling
2021	EF Education–Nippo
2022–	EF Education–EasyPost

EF Education–EasyPost (UCI Code: EFE) is an American professional cycling team. Founded in 2003, they have competed in the UCI World Tour since 2009. Headquartered in Boulder, Colorado, United States, the team maintains an equipment and training facility in Girona, Catalonia, Spain. In 2018, EF Education First, an international education company — founded in Sweden but headquartered and incorporated in Switzerland — purchased a controlling equity stake in Slipstream Sports, the sports management company behind the team. The founder and CEO is American Jonathan Vaughters and the head sporting director is Briton Charly Wegelius. (Note: Wegelius holds dual citizenship with Finland and the United Kingdom. However, he has a license with British Cycling (BC) under the Union Cycliste Internationale (UCI).)

Between 2008 and 2021, the team won 36 Grand Tour stages and 37 national road race and time trial championships.

EF Education–EasyPost is known for its anti-doping stance. The team reviews blood levels before signing riders, and maintains an internal testing system. Before 2015, no rider had tested positive during or after his tenure at the team. American Tom Danielson tested positive for synthetic testosterone in August 2015. In October 2016, he accepted a four-year suspension for unintentionally consuming dehydroepiandrosterone. Riders who competed with banned substances in the late 1990s to early 2000s are eligible to ride after their confession and ban.

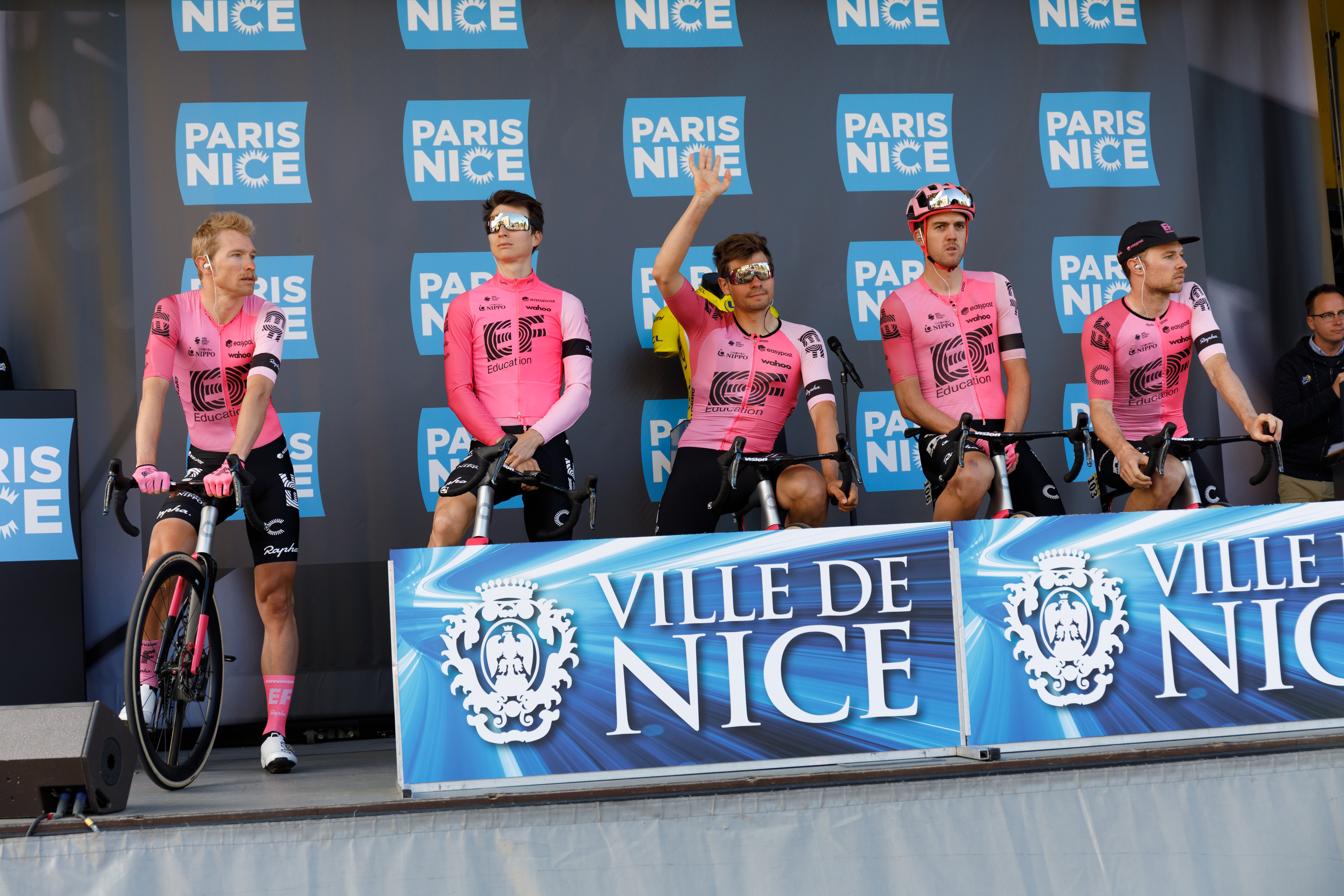
The team at the 2023 Paris–Nice

== History ==
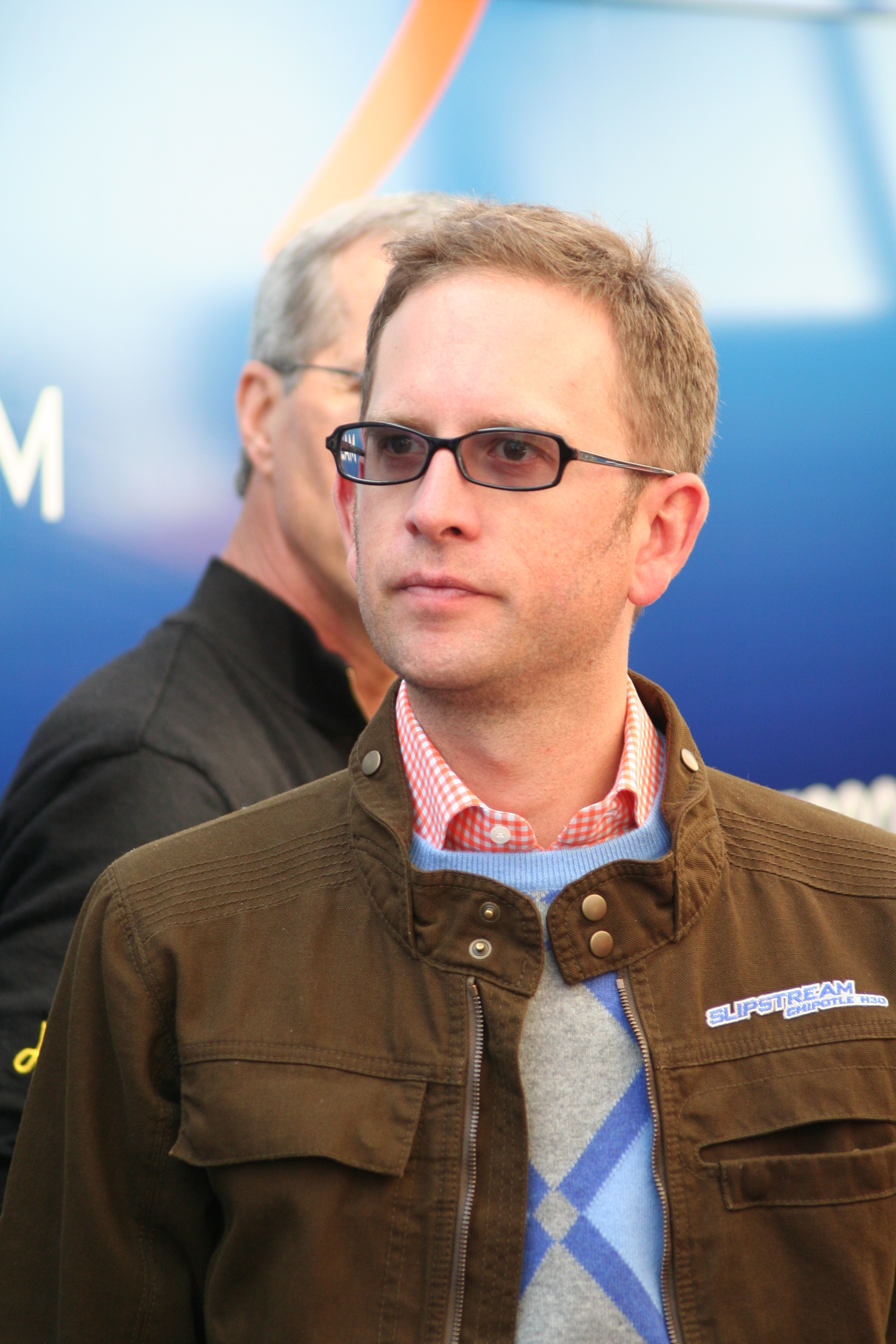
Jonathan Vaughters in 2008

=== Slipstream Sports ===
Slipstream Sports LLC was an American professional cycling organization founded in 2003 by Jonathan Vaughters, Beth Seliga, and Doug Ellis.

Doug Ellis served as a financial backer and co-founder of the organization, providing early funding and strategic support for the development of the team.

Beth Seliga served in multiple operational roles in the organization’s early years, including finance, logistics, and media production, and was described by founder Jonathan Vaughters as central to the team’s early success. Seliga also contributed to early team branding concepts, including ideas that influenced the team’s visual identity.

=== Early years ===
Vaughters founded the team for 2003 as a junior development squad. Its sponsor was 5280 magazine in Denver. The following year TIAA–CREF became sponsor and Vaughters fielded professional and amateur riders. 5280 and TIAA–CREF continued to sponsor Garmin's youth riders in subsequent years, followed by the restaurant chain Chipotle Mexican Grill.

=== 5280 Development Program (2003–2012) ===
The 5280/Subaru Development Program was established in Colorado in 2003 by Jonathan Vaughters, Colby Pearce, and Dan Brogan to identify and develop junior cyclists, focusing on road and track racing as part of a broader athlete development pathway.

Former professional rider Colby Pearce served as an early sporting director and coach, overseeing rider development and race programs. In 2004, Ben Turner joined the program’s leadership, contributing to team structure and junior athlete development as the program expanded.

During the late 2000s, the program continued under the broader Slipstream development structure, with Erik Hultgren directing junior development and coordinating progression from junior ranks to U23 teams.

The 5280 program produced multiple U.S. junior national titles and podium finishes at national championships

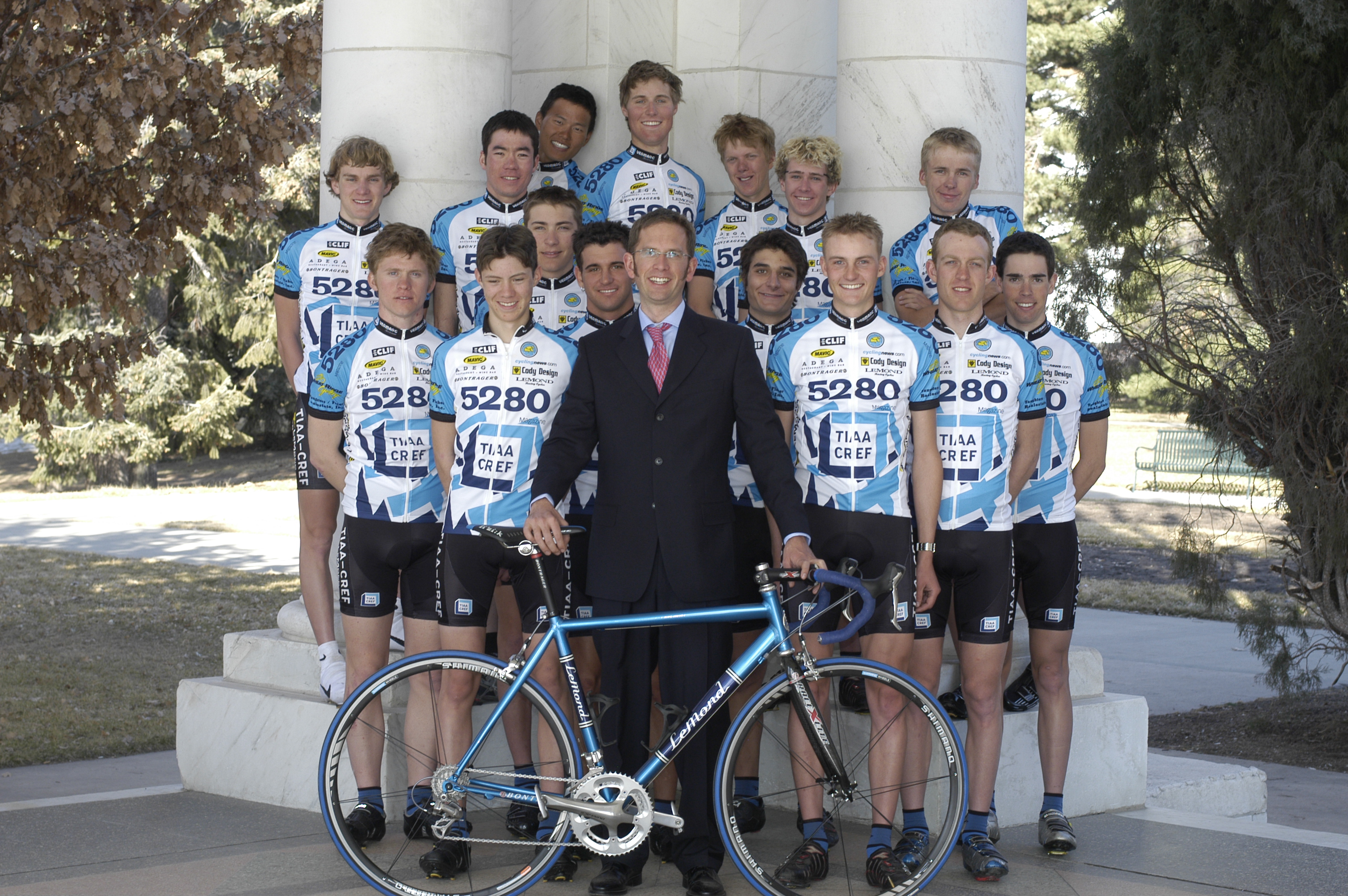
Members of the 5280 junior cycling team, sponsored by TIAA-CREF, with Jonathan Vaughters, circa 2003–2004.

The team operated as a feeder program into the U23 TIAA-CREF development squad beginning in 2005, forming part of a vertically integrated development system that later supported the professional Slipstream team.

Riders associated with the 5280 program included Tejay van Garderen, as well as Alex Howes and Peter Stetina, all of whom later advanced to professional and WorldTour-level competition.

=== U23 Development Team (2004–2010) ===
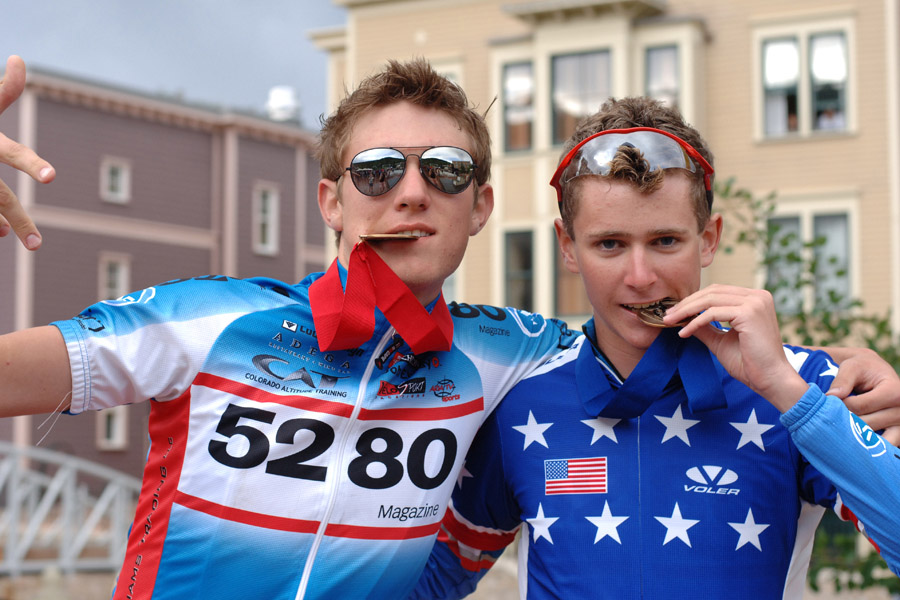
Stetina won the National Championship in the junior men's road race, finishing alongside teammate Tejay van Garderen. 2005 USA Junior National Championships in Park City

The U23 development team served as a bridge between junior and professional racing within the Slipstream Sports structure. From 2004 to 2006 it operated as the TIAA-CREF / 5280 Development Team, later transitioning to VMG–Felt / Felt–Holowesko Partners from 2006 to 2008.

From 2008 to 2010, the program competed as the Chipotle Development Team and later Chipotle–First Solar, a UCI Continental squad aligned with the professional Slipstream team.

=== 2007–2010 ===
In 2007, Slipstream Sports LLC took the management and the team raced under the name Team Slipstream, competing in UCI races across Europe and North America. Key riders included David Millar, Christian Vande Velde, Tom Danielson, and Will Frischkorn. The broader program was supported by staff working from the organization’s Girona base, including Johnny Weltz providing technical and tactical support and Katrina Grove as Operational and Accounting Director.

In 2008 Chipotle Mexican Grill began to sponsor the team and the team name was changed to Team Slipstream by Chipotle. The name was changed again in June 2008 after the navigation system manufacturer Garmin was announced as the title sponsor, a week prior to the 2008 Tour de France.

Their first major Tour was the 2008 Giro d'Italia, where they won the Team Time Trial and Christian Vande Velde wore the pink jersey for one stage. In the Tour de France Vande Velde finished fourth and the team was leading from stage 3 until stage 6. Garmin remained sponsor in 2009 and the team was renamed Garmin–Slipstream. In the 2009 Tour de France Bradley Wiggins was a major surprise, finishing fourth overall – later upgraded to third place after Lance Armstrong's results were voided by the UCI – while Vande Velde finished eighth.

In the 2009 Vuelta a España the sprinter Tyler Farrar, the time trial specialist David Millar and the Canadian Ryder Hesjedal took stage wins for the team. In 2010 Transitions Optical became co-sponsors of the team. Hesjedal was the best rider for the team in the 2010 Tour de France, finishing seventh.

=== 2011–2014 ===
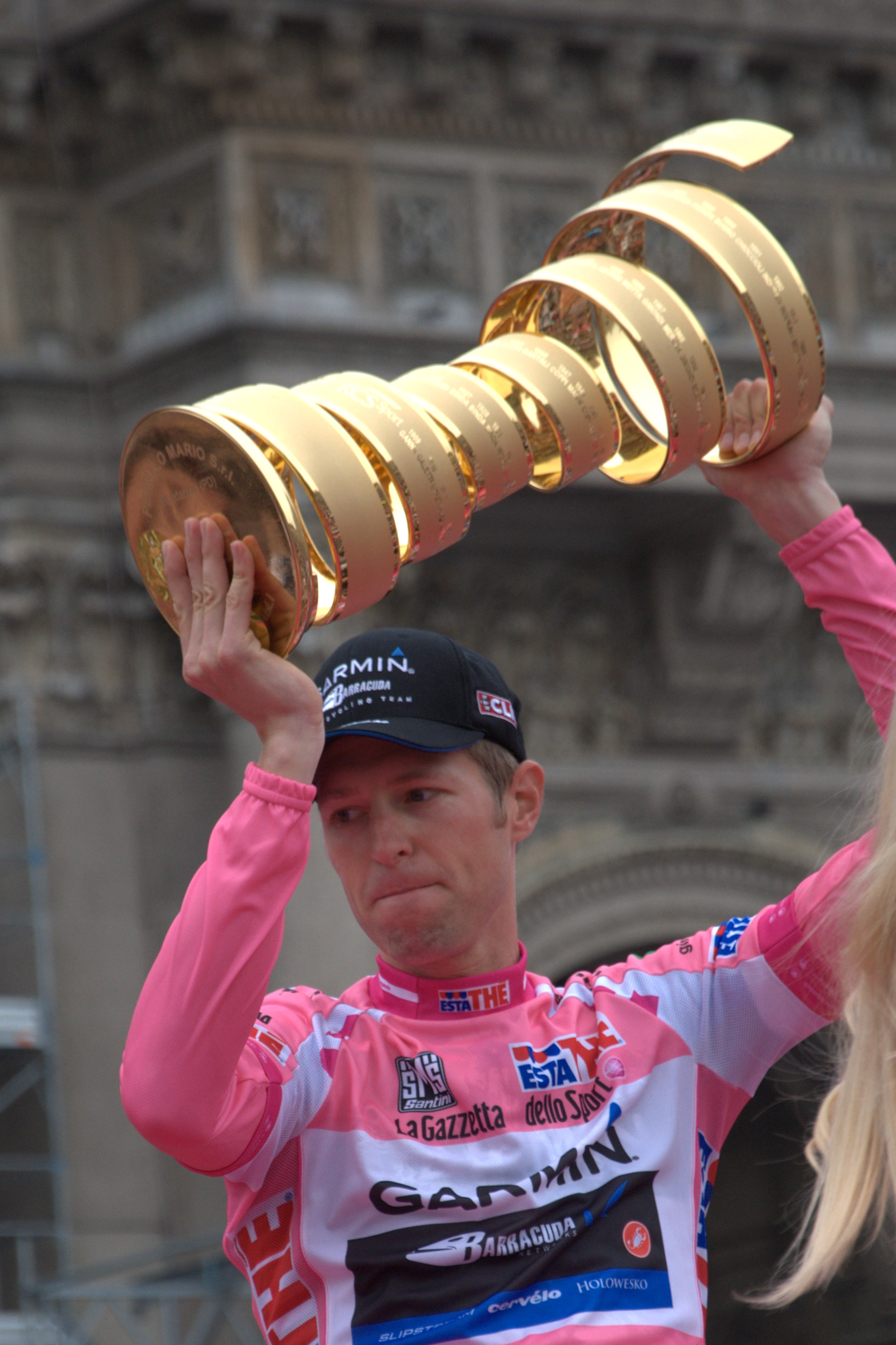
Ryder Hesjedal after winning the 2012 Giro d'Italia

On August 28, 2010, Garmin-Transitions announced it was switching working agreements from Felt Bicycles to Cervélo bikes, and that it would change its name to Garmin–Cervélo for the 2011 season. Felt chose not to exercise its option with Garmin-Transitions after a four-year working agreement. The Cervélo TestTeam folded and seven riders moved to Garmin–Cervélo, including then world champion Thor Hushovd.

Ahead of the 2012 season, the team again changed names to Garmin-Barracuda, after Barracuda Networks joined the team as a sponsor. Despite giving up the team's second name, Cervélo remained with the team as its official bicycle supplier. In June 2012, the Sharp Corporation became the second team name sponsor, although Barracuda remained a named member of the organisation.

After months of speculation, Garmin–Sharp and Cannondale announced on 20 August 2014 that for the 2015 season the two teams would merge. Cannondale became the title sponsor and bike supplier, with Garmin remaining a key team sponsor. Slipstream Sports became the managerial organisation behind the team.

=== 2015–2021 ===
The 2015 season did not match the team's expectations, with only one World Tour win, courtesy of Davide Formolo at the Giro d'Italia. At the end of the season it was announced that long term team leaders, Dan Martin & Ryder Hesjedal would leave the team for Etixx Quickstep & Trek Factory Racing respectively. Co-title sponsor Garmin also announced they would not continue sponsorship of the team. In 2021, Japanese construction company Nippo Corporation became a co-title sponsor.

In 2022, American shipping company EasyPost took over as the co-title sponsor, although Nippo remained within the team's organization and continued its sponsorship of the EF Education–Nippo Development Team.

== Notable results ==
Between the 2009 and the 2018 UCI World Tours, the team finished inside the top-ten on six occasions. Notable results include: the 2009 Vattenfall Cyclassics and the 2010 Vattenfall Cyclassics with American Tyler Farrar, the 2010 Tour de Pologne, the 2013 Volta a Catalunya, the 2013 Liège–Bastogne–Liège, and the 2014 Giro di Lombardia with Irishman Dan Martin, the 2011 Tour Down Under with Australian Cameron Meyer, the 2011 Paris–Roubaix with Belgian Johan Vansummeren, the 2012 Giro d'Italia with Canadian Ryder Hesjedal, the 2014 Critérium du Dauphiné with American Andrew Talansky, the 2019 Tour of Flanders with Italian Alberto Bettiol, the 2019 Bretagne Classic Ouest–France with Belgian Sep Vanmarcke, the 2020 Critérium du Dauphiné with Colombian Daniel Martínez, and the 2021 Clásica de San Sebastián and the 2025 Dwars door Vlaanderen with American Neilson Powless.

Between 2008 and 2024, the team claimed 42 Grand Tour stages – 14 in the Giro d'Italia, 11 in the Tour de France, and 17 in the Vuelta a España. Colombian Rigoberto Urán and Briton Bradley Wiggins finished second and third, respectively, in the 2017 and 2009 Tours de France. Briton Hugh Carthy finished third at the 2020 Vuelta a España. In 2010, Garmin–Transitions signed Norwegian Thor Hushovd, the reigning UCI Road World Race Champion. In 2010, Briton David Millar won the silver medal at the UCI Road World Time Trial Championships.

In 2015, 2018, and 2021, Lithuanian Ramūnas Navardauskas, Canadian Michael Woods, and Dane Michael Valgren won the bronze medal at their respective UCI Road World Race Championships. Between 2006 and 2012, the squad was partnered with American Chipotle–First Solar Development Team in the UCI America Tour. Between 2017 and 2019, it had ties to Australian Drapac Cannondale Holistic Development Team in the UCI Oceania Tour.

Between 2008 and 2023, the squad won 41 national road race and time trial championships.

== Anti-doping program ==
When the team entered the Professional Continental ranks they began in the Agency for Cycling Ethics program to eliminate doping. First, by recruiting admitted dopers before being hired, riders are required to admit any past doping offenses to the team while keeping those revelations from the public, then by what is now conventional means. Participants are tested repeatedly to develop a bio-stable marker profile.

Future tests check that these markers have not moved. If they have, it is a sign that the rider is ill or has taken performance-enhancing drugs. If any change has been noted, the rider cannot race until the markers have returned to normal. Riders are interviewed and tested for illness or doping.

Sports scientist Allen Lim was associated with the team’s performance and physiological monitoring during this period.

== 2018 season funding issues ==
During the 2017 Vuelta a España, Vaughters announced that a sponsor had backed out of a commitment to provide the team with funding for the following season, and that riders under contract for 2018 were free to seek employment elsewhere. In an effort to allow the team to continue racing in the 2018 season and raise the US$7 million to continue for the next season under the UCI's requirements for a WorldTour team, a crowdfunding system was set up and other sponsors sought using the hashtag #SaveArgyle. Raising over half a million dollars from ~4,700 donors was not quite enough to do the trick, however the campaign was an incredibly important stepping off point.

An employee of EF Education First contacted Vaughters after learning of Slipstream Sports' plight and alerted higherups at the company about the issue. After a failed pitch to EF back in 2014, the efforts of Slipstream this time were much more fruitful. After a decline of EF's 2017 offer of a one-year funding deal, Vaughters was able to convince chairman Phillip Hult to arrange an asset purchase from the majority owner of Slipstream, effectively rendering the team EF's. On September 7, Vaughters emailed his riders to inform them that their 2018 contracts would now be enforced, and two days later on September 9, 2017, the new sponsor was announced.

== 2026 season funding issues ==
In October 2026, following the early departure of Richard Carapaz to NSN Cycling Team, team manager Jonathan Vaughters shared publicly news of funding difficulties at EF. Vaughters stated that the team was looking at budget cuts of up to 15% due to increased operating costs and the departure of vegan milk brand Oatly as a title sponsor of the women's pro team.

== Team roster ==
As of August 4, 2026.

Rider	Date of birth
Mattia Agostinacchio (ITA)	September 13, 2007 (age 19)
Vincenzo Albanese (ITA)	November 12, 1996 (age 29)
Kasper Asgreen (DEN)	February 8, 1995 (age 31)
Samuele Battistella (ITA)	November 14, 1998 (age 27)
Alex Baudin (FRA)	May 25, 2001 (age 25)
Markel Beloki (ESP)	July 27, 2005 (age 21)
Richard Carapaz (ECU)	May 29, 1993 (age 33)
Jefferson Alexander Cepeda (ECU)	June 16, 1998 (age 28)
Ben Healy (IRL)	September 11, 2000 (age 26)
Noah Hobbs (GBR)	July 23, 2004 (age 22)
Mikkel Frølich Honoré (DEN)	January 29, 1997 (age 29)
Luke Lamperti (USA)	December 31, 2002 (age 23)
Michael Leonard (CAN)	March 26, 2004 (age 22)
Alastair Mackellar (AUS)	January 20, 2002 (age 24)
Madis Mihkels (EST)	May 21, 2003 (age 23)

Rider	Date of birth
Lukas Nerurkar (GBR)	November 14, 2003 (age 22)
Neilson Powless (USA)	September 3, 1996 (age 30)
Sean Quinn (USA)	May 10, 2000 (age 26)
Darren Rafferty (IRL)	July 1, 2003 (age 23)
Juan Felipe Rodríguez (Note: Joined on 1 August.) (COL)	November 5, 2003 (age 22)
Archie Ryan (IRL)	November 16, 2001 (age 24)
Matthias Schwarzbacher (SVK)	December 22, 2005 (age 20)
James Shaw (GBR)	June 13, 1996 (age 30)
Colby Simmons (USA)	October 16, 2003 (age 23)
Georg Steinhauser (GER)	October 21, 2001 (age 25)
Harry Sweeny (AUS)	July 9, 1998 (age 28)
Michael Valgren (DEN)	February 7, 1992 (age 34)
Marijn van den Berg (NED)	July 19, 1999 (age 27)
Jardi van der Lee (NED)	August 6, 2001 (age 25)
Max Walker (GBR)	July 14, 2001 (age 25)

== National champions ==
2005
American under-23 road race, Ian MacGregor
2006
American criterium, Bradly Huff
American under-23 road race, Craig Lewis
2008
American time trial, David Zabriskie
Irish road race, Dan Martin
New Zealander road race, Julian Dean
2009
American time trial, David Zabriskie
British time trial, Bradley Wiggins
Canadian time trial, Svein Tuft
2010
Australian time trial, Cameron Meyer
Australian road race, Travis Meyer
Brazilian road race, Murilo Fischer
Canadian time trial, Svein Tuft
2011
American time trial, David Zabriskie
Australian time trial, Cameron Meyer
Australian road race, Jack Bobridge
Brazilian road race, Murilo Fischer
Lithuanian road race, Ramūnas Navardauskas
2012
American time trial, David Zabriskie
German road race, Fabian Wegmann
Lithuanian time trial, Ramūnas Navardauskas
South African road race, Robert Hunter
2014
Australian criterium, Steele Von Hoff
Dutch road race, Sebastian Langeveld
Lithuanian time trial, Ramūnas Navardauskas
2015
American time trial, Andrew Talansky
Lithuanian time trial, Ramūnas Navardauskas
2016
Lithuanian road race, Ramūnas Navardauskas
New Zealander time trial, Patrick Bevin
2017
Irish road race, Ryan Mullen
Irish time trial, Ryan Mullen
2019
American road race, Alex Howes
Colombian time trial, Daniel Martínez
Ecuadorian road race, Jonathan Caicedo
Ecuadorian time trial, Jonathan Caicedo
2020
Colombian road race, Sergio Higuita
Colombian time trial, Daniel Martínez
2021
American time trial, Lawson Craddock
2022
Irish time trial, Ben Healy
Eritrean road race, Merhawi Kudus
2023
Colombian road race, Esteban Chaves
South African time trial, Stefan de Bod
Ecuadorian time trial, Jonathan Caicedo
Ecuadorian road race, Richard Carapaz
Irish road race, Ben Healy
2024
Ecuadorian time trial, Richard Carapaz
American road race, Sean Quinn
2025
Estonian road race, Madis Mihkels

== Team rankings ==
League	2009	2010	2011	2012	2013	2014	2015	2016	2017	2018	2019	2020	2021	2022	2023	2024
UCI World Tour	11	6	8	9	8	11	16	8	10	16	11	10	16	18	11	12
