= Jorge Luis Montenegro =

Ecuadorian cyclist (born 1988)

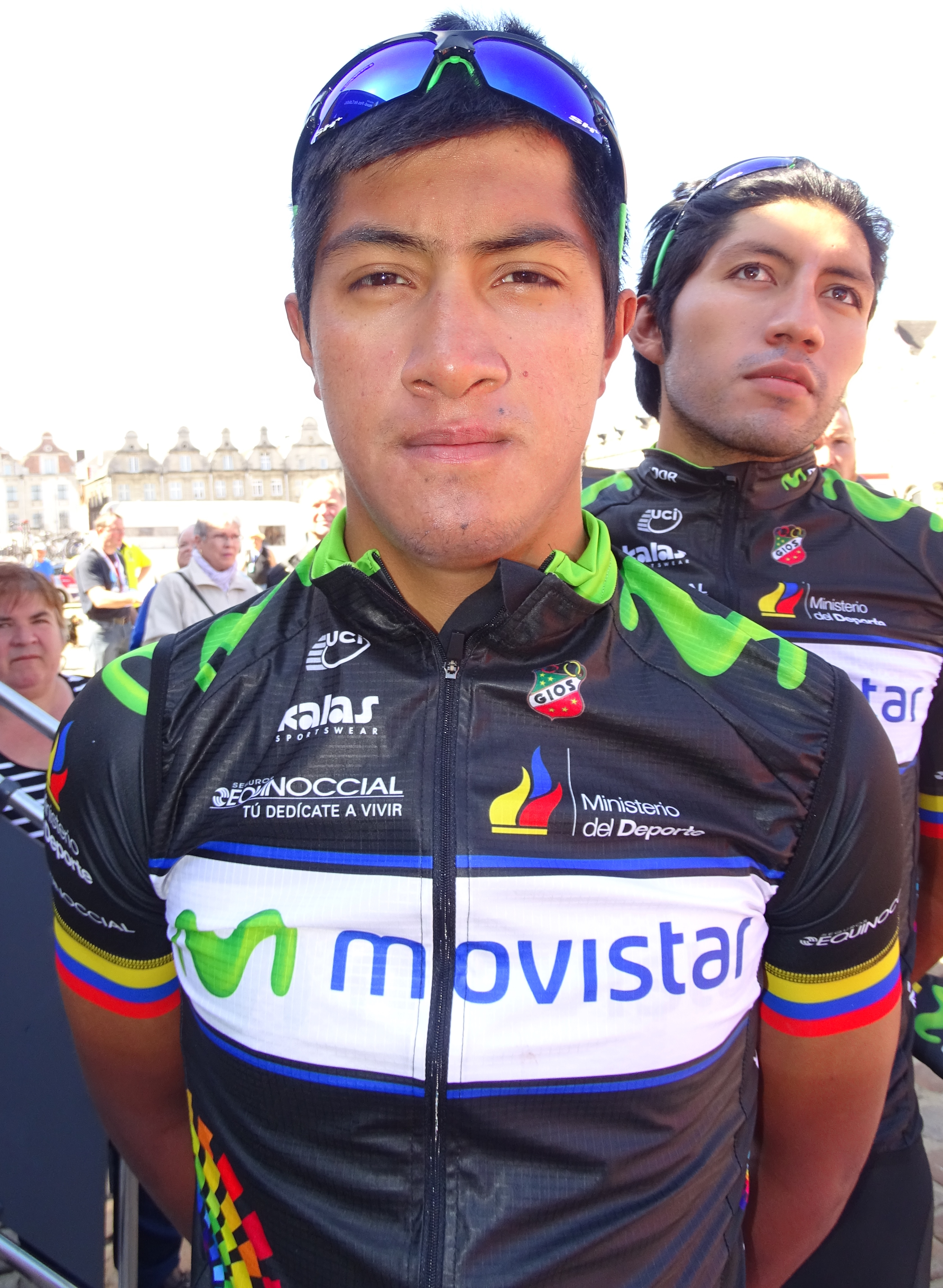
- Montenegro at the 2015 Paris–Arras Tour

Personal information
- Full name: Jorge Luis Montenegro Revelo
- Born: 26 September 1988 (age 38) Tulcán, Ecuador

Cycling career
- Sport: Cycling
- Current team: Team Banco Guayaquil–Bianchi
- Discipline: Road
- Role: Rider

Amateur teams
- 2013: RPM Ecuador
- 2018: Prefectura del Carchi
- 2019: Tims Eagle Bike
- 2020–2021: Movistar Team Ecuador

Professional teams
- 2014–2016: Team Ecuador
- 2022–: Team Banco Guayaquil–Ecuador
Medal record
Men's track cycling
Representing Ecuador
Pan American Championships
Silver medal – second place	2018 Aguascalientes	Points race

Jorge Luis Montenegro Revelo (born 26 September 1988) is an Ecuadorian cyclist, who currently rides for UCI Continental team Team Banco Guayaquil–Bianchi.

== Major results ==
2007
9th Overall Vuelta al Ecuador

1st Stage 9

2012
2nd Overall Vuelta al Ecuador

1st Stage 7

2013
1st Stage 10 Vuelta al Ecuador
2014
National Road Championships

3rd Road race
4th Time trial

2015
10th Road race, Pan American Road Championships
10th Overall Vuelta Mexico Telmex
2017
National Road Championships

1st Time trial
2nd Road race

2018
National Road Championships

2nd Time trial
3rd Road race

7th Time trial, South American Games
2019
1st Overall Vuelta al Ecuador

1st Stage 2

4th Road race, National Road Championships
2020
10th Overall Vuelta al Ecuador
2021
1st Time trial, National Road Championships
9th Overall Vuelta al Ecuador
10th Time trial, Pan American Road Championships
2022
2nd Time trial, National Road Championships
