= Movistar Team =

Movistar Team may refer to:

- Movistar Team (men's team), a professional cycling team that competes on the UCI World Tour
- Movistar Team (women's team), a professional cycling team that competes on the UCI Women's World Tour
- Movistar–Best PC, an Ecuadorian developmental cycling team that competes on UCI Continental circuits
- Movistar Team (Continental Team), a twice disbanded Colombian developmental cycling team that competed on UCI Continental circuits
- Movistar Team Ecuador, a defunct Ecuadorian developmental cycling team that competed on UCI Continental circuits
