= 2015 Pan American Road Cycling Championships =

Continental road cycling championships in the Americas

- Venue: León, Guanajuato, Mexico
- Date: May 7–10, 2015
- Nations participating: 24
- Cyclists participating: 200
- Events: 6

The 2015 Pan American Road Cycling Championships took place at León, Guanajuato, Mexico, May 7–10, 2015.

== Medal summary ==
=== Men ===
Event	Gold	Silver	Bronze
Individual road race	Byron Guamá; Ecuador	Josué González; Costa Rica	Juan Pablo Magallanes; Mexico
Individual time trial	Carlos Oyarzún; Chile	Manuel Rodas; Guatemala	Alejandro Durán; Argentina

=== Women ===
Event	Gold	Silver	Bronze
Individual road race	Marlies Mejías; Cuba	Coryn Rivera; United States	Yumari González; Cuba
Individual time trial	Carmen Small; United States	Tara Whitten; Canada	Clemilda Fernandes; Brazil

=== Under 23 Men ===
Event	Gold	Silver	Bronze
Individual road race	Jhonatan Restrepo; Colombia	José Rodríguez; Chile	Lucas Gaday; Argentina
Individual time trial	Ignacio Prado; Mexico	Sebastian Trillini; Argentina	José Rodríguez; Chile

== Results ==
=== Men elite road race ===
Rank	Rider	Nation	Time
1st place, gold medalist(s)	Byron Guamá	Ecuador	4:12:46
2nd place, silver medalist(s)	Josué González	Costa Rica	+ 7"
3rd place, bronze medalist(s)	Juan Pablo Magallanes	Mexico	+ 17"
4	William Chiarello	Brazil	+ 23"
5	Adam de Vos	Canada	+ 31"
6	Manuel Rodas	Guatemala	+ 42"
7	~~Adrian Alvarado~~ (Note: Adrian Alvarado tested positive to EPO and received a two year ban retroactive from 1 May 2014 until 30 April 2016.)	Chile	~~+ 1'06"~~
7	Segundo Navarrete	Ecuador	+ 1'46"
8	Paulo Mudarra	Costa Rica	+ 3'21"
9	Cristian Egidio	Brazil	+ 3'26"
10	Jorge Montenegro	Ecuador	+ 3'42"
11	André de Souza	Brazil	+ 3'51"
12	Diego Milán	Dominican Republic	+ 3'51"
13	Moises Algape	Mexico	+ 3'54"
14	Patricio Almonacid	Chile	+ 3'54"
15	Eder Frayre	Mexico	+ 3'57"
16	Richard Mascaranas	Uruguay	+ 4'01"
17	Wolfgang Burmann	Chile	+ 4'02"
18	Carlos Oyarzun	Chile	+ 4'02"
19	Royner Navarro	Peru	+ 4'06"
20	Alexander Cataford	Canada	+ 4'06"
21	Juan Rojas	Costa Rica	+ 4'07"
22	Florencio Ramos	Mexico	+ 4'07"
23	Alonso Gamero	Peru	+ 4'11"
24	Alfredo Ajpacaja Tax	Guatemala	+ 4'14"
25	Rubén Ramos	Argentina	+ 4'16"
26	Alejandro Durán	Argentina	+ 5'37"
27	Nervin Jiatz	Guatemala	+ 5'50"
28	José Rujano	Venezuela	+ 7'21"
29	Carlos Quishpe	Ecuador	+ 7'21"
30	Uri Martins	Mexico	+ 7'21"
31	Jorge Bravo	Uruguay	+ 7'21"
32	Jorge Contreras	Chile	+ 7'21"
33	Ulises Alfredo Castillo	Mexico	+ 7'21"
34	Pedro Dourado	Brazil	+ 7'21"
35	Jonathan Villavicencio	Ecuador	+ 7'24"
36	Gonzalo Garrido	Chile	+ 7'24"
37	Matias Pérez	Uruguay	+ 7'24"
	Magno Nazaret	Brazil	DNF
	Franklin Chacon	Venezuela	DNF
	Jackson Rodríguez	Venezuela	DNF
	Kléber Ramos	Brazil	DNF
	Xavier Quevedo	Venezuela	DNF
	Matteo Dal-Cin	Canada	DNF
	Yeison Delgado	Venezuela	DNF
	Efren Ortega	Puerto Rico	DNF
	Joseph Seppy	Puerto Rico	DNF
	Chelet Cadet	Haiti	DNF
	Jean Joseph	Haiti	DNF
	Jean Toussaint	Haiti	DNF
	Mauricio Muller	Argentina	DNF
	Pierrick Naud	Canada	DNF
	Enzo Moyano	Argentina	DNF
	Julio Padilla	Guatemala	DNF
	José Ragonessi	Ecuador	DNF
	Daniel Díaz	Argentina	DNF
	Jhon Cunto	Peru	DNF
	Carlos Brenes	Costa Rica	DNF
	Roman Villalobos	Costa Rica	DNF
	Carlos Cabrera	Uruguay	DNF
	Daniel Juárez	Argentina	DNF
	Gregory Duarte	Uruguay	DNF
	Ignacio Maldonado	Uruguay	DNF
	Brayan Rios	Guatemala	DNF
	Carlos Gálviz	Venezuela	DNF
	Erick Mendoza	Peru	DNS
	Jean Monuma	Haiti	DNF

=== Men elite individual time trial ===
Rank	Rider	Nation	Time
1st place, gold medalist(s)	Carlos Oyarzun	Chile	4:12:46
2nd place, silver medalist(s)	Manuel Rodas	Guatemala	+ 45"
3rd place, bronze medalist(s)	Alejandro Durán	Argentina	+ 1:11"
4	Pedro Dourado	Brazil	+ 1:42"
5	Magno OKI Nazaret	Brazil	+ 1:59"
6	José Rujano	Venezuela	+ 2:29"
7	Segundo Navarrete	Ecuador	+ 2'36"
8	Josué González	Costa Rica	+ 2'46"
9	Brayan Rios	Guatemala	+ 4'05"
10	Carlos Gálviz	Venezuela	+ 4'06"
11	Uri Martins	Mexico	+ 5'24"
12	José Ragonessi	Ecuador	+ 5'46"
13	Alonso Gamero	Peru	+ 5'52"
14	Ulises Alfredo Castillo	Mexico	+ 6'16"
15	Wolfgang Burmann	Chile	+ 7'01"
	Roman Villalobos	Costa Rica	DNF
	Erick Mendoza	Peru	DNF

=== Women road race ===
Rank	Rider	Nation	Time
1st place, gold medalist(s)	Marlies Mejías	Cuba	4:12:46
2nd place, silver medalist(s)	Coryn Rivera	United States	+ 0"
3rd place, bronze medalist(s)	Yumari González	Cuba	+ 0"
4	Arlenis Sierra	Cuba	+ 0"
5	Jennifer César	Venezuela	+ 0"
6	Gleydimar Tapia	Venezuela	+ 0"
7	Janildes Fernandes	Brazil	+ 0"
8	Clemilda Fernandes	Brazil	+ 0"
9	Iraida García	Cuba	+ 0"
10	Camila Ferreira	Brazil	+ 0"
11	Erika Varela	Mexico	+ 0"
12	Leidimar Suárez	Venezuela	+ 0"
13	Daniela Guajardo	Chile	+ 0"
14	Yareli Salazar	Mexico	+ 0"
15	Luciene Ferreyra	Brazil	+ 0"
16	Wilmarys Moreno	Venezuela	+ 0"
17	Angie González	Venezuela	+ 0"
18	Íngrid Drexel	Mexico	+ 0"
19	Edith Guillén	Costa Rica	+ 0"
20	Solymar Rivera	Puerto Rico	+ 0"
21	Milagro Mena	Costa Rica	+ 0"
22	Zuralmy Rivas	Venezuela	+ 0"
23	Cynthia Lee	Guatemala	+ 0"
24	Miryan Núñez	Ecuador	+ 0"
25	Carmen Small	United States	+ 0"
26	Constanza Paredes	Chile	+ 0"
27	Mayra del Rocío	Mexico	+ 0"
28	Laura Morfin	Mexico	+ 0"
29	Graciela Zarate	Argentina	+ 0"
30	Ana Polegatch	Brazil	+ 0"
31	Carolina Rodríguez	Uruguay	+ 9"
32	Jazmin Soto	Guatemala	+ 9"
33	Aranza Villalón	Chile	+ 12"
34	Marcela Rubiano	Costa Rica	+ 12"
35	Denisse Ahumada	Chile	+ 12"
36	Yoanka González	Cuba	+ 12"
37	Donelys Cariño	Puerto Rico	+ 12"
38	Tayler Wiles	United States	+ 31"
39	Lauren Hall	United States	+ 11:13"
	Karla Vallejos	Chile	DSQ
	Paola Muñoz	Chile	DSQ
	Paula Herrera	Costa Rica	DNF
	Emelyn Galicia	Guatemala	DNF
	María Preciozo	Argentina	DNF
	Cassandra Rodríguez	Costa Rica	DNF
	Ingrid Ramírez	Costa Rica	DNF

=== Women time trial ===
Rank	Rider	Nation	Time
1st place, gold medalist(s)	Carmen Small	United States	27:55
2nd place, silver medalist(s)	Tara Whitten	Canada	+ 15"
3rd place, bronze medalist(s)	Clemilda Fernandes	Brazil	+ 1:32"
4	Ana Polegatch	Brazil	+ 1:46"
5	Íngrid Drexel	Mexico	+ 2:26"
6	Constanza Paredes	Chile	+ 2:45"
7	Graciela Zarate	Argentina	+ 3'04"
8	Jessica Bonilla	Costa Rica	+ 3'30"
9	Miryan Núñez	Ecuador	+ 3'33"
10	Marlies Mejías	Cuba	+ 4'35"
11	Tayler Wiles	United States	+ 7'31"

=== Under 23 Men road race ===
Rank	Rider	Nation	Time
1st place, gold medalist(s)	Jhonatan Restrepo	Ecuador	3:26:14
2nd place, silver medalist(s)	José Rodríguez	Chile	+ 1"
3rd place, bronze medalist(s)	Lucas Gaday	Argentina	+ 1"
4	Richard Carapaz	Ecuador	+ 1"
5	Wilmar Paredes	Colombia	+ 9"
6	Elias Tello	Chile	+ 29"
7	Endrigo da Rosa	Brazil	+ 58"
8	Emiliano Contreras	Argentina	+ 58"
9	Germán Tivani	Argentina	+ 2'19"
10	Esteban Villareal	Ecuador	+ 2'19"
11	Cristian Pita	Ecuador	+ 2'19"
12	Sebastian Trillini	Argentina	+ 2'19"
13	Jhon Anderson Rodríguez	Colombia	+ 2'19"
14	Matias Arriaga	Chile	+ 2'19"
15	Dorian Monterroso	Guatemala	+ 2'19"
16	Jefferson Cepeda	Ecuador	+ 2'19"
17	Yonder Godoy	Venezuela	+ 2'19"
18	Anderson Paredes	Venezuela	+ 2'19"
19	Ignacio Prado	Mexico	+ 2'26"
20	Aldemar Reyes	Colombia	+ 6'06"
21	Orluis Aular	Venezuela	+ 6'06"
22	Johan Pérez	Colombia	+ 6'06"
23	Franco Vecchi	Argentina	+ 8'09"
24	Ricky Morales	Puerto Rico	+ 8'30"
25	Jhonatan de León	Guatemala	+ 8'32"
26	Alfredo Sánchez	Mexico	+ 8'32"
27	Alejandro Morales	Chile	+ 8'32"
28	Moisés Arce	Costa Rica	+ 8'35"
29	Gabriel Pérez	Chile	+ 8'35"
30	Victor Olivarez	Chile	+ 8'35"
31	Roniel Campos	Venezuela	+ 8'35"
	Ismael Cárdenas	Venezuela	DNF
	Jhorman Flores	Venezuela	DNF
	Brian Babilonia	Puerto Rico	DNF
	Gerson Toc	Guatemala	DNF
	Ismael Laguna	Argentina	DNF
	Pedro Rodríguez	Ecuador	DNF
	Jonathan Casillas	Mexico	DNF
	Jairo López	Mexico	DNF
	José Alfredo Santoyo	Mexico	DNF
	José Rodríguez	Costa Rica	DNF
	César Gárate	Peru	DNF
	Jorge Gómez	Colombia	DNF
	Francisco Lara	Mexico	DNF
	Daniel Bonilla	Costa Rica	DNF
	Adrián Jaramillo	Ecuador	DNF

=== Under 23 Men time trial ===
Rank	Rider	Nation	Time
1st place, gold medalist(s)	Ignacio Prado	Mexico	35:06
2nd place, silver medalist(s)	Sebastian Trillini	Argentina	+ 13"
3rd place, bronze medalist(s)	José Rodríguez	Chile	+ 15"
4	Endrigo da Rosa	Brazil	+ 57"
5	Jhonatan Restrepo	Colombia	+ 1:15"
6	Richard Carapaz	Ecuador	+ 1:22"
7	Adam de Vos	Canada	+ 1'25"
8	Emiliano Contreras	Argentina	+ 1'36"
9	Alexander Cataford	Canada	+ 2'11"
10	José Alfredo Santoyo	Mexico	+ 2'11"
11	Jhon Anderson Rodríguez	Colombia	+ 2'41"
12	Moisés Arce	Costa Rica	+ 3'17"
13	Ismael Cárdenas	Venezuela	+ 3'21"
14	Yonder Godoy	Venezuela	+ 3'58"
15	Adrián Jaramillo	Ecuador	+ 4'38"
