= Miryam Núñez =

Ecuadorian cyclist (born 1994)

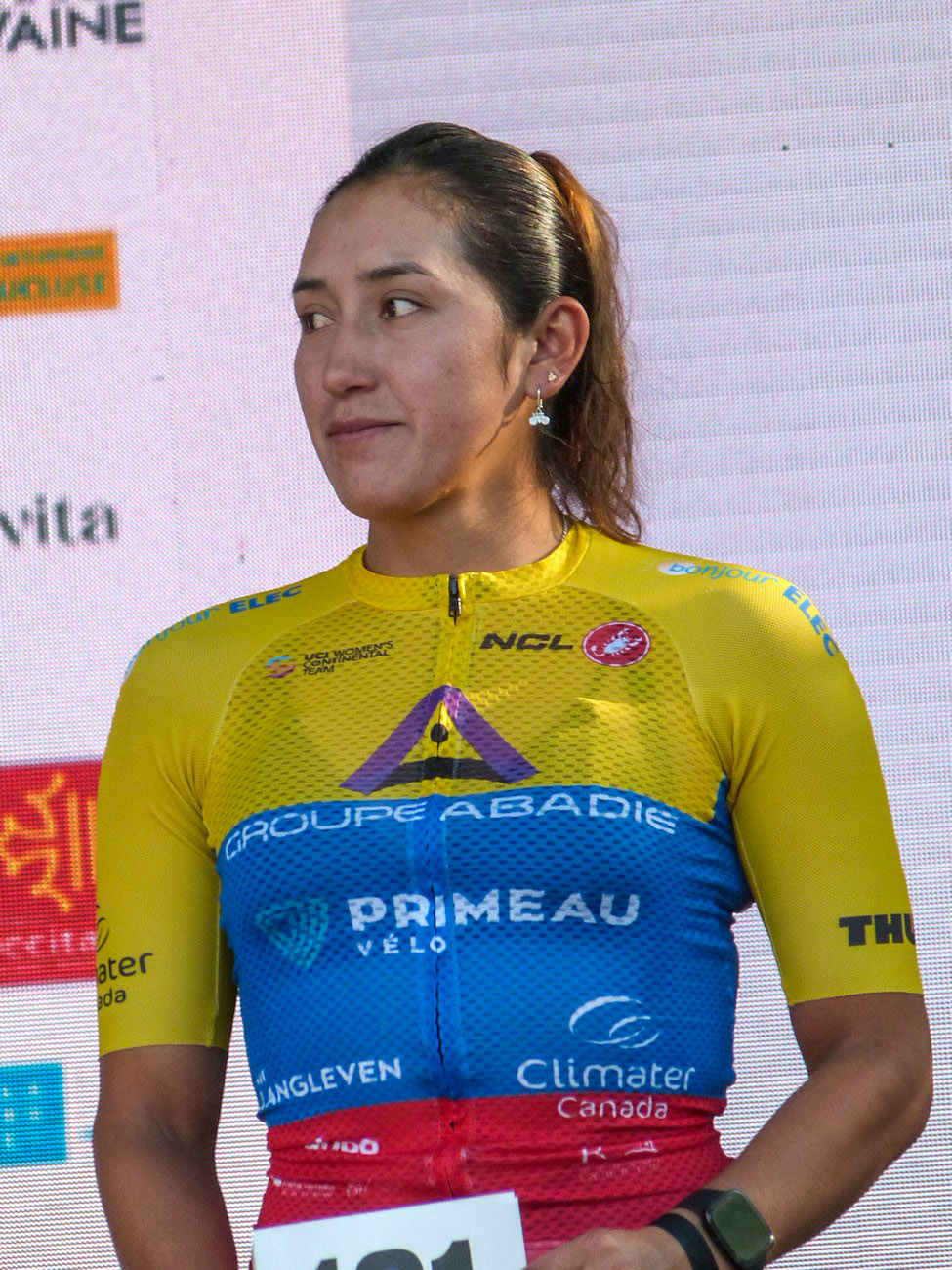
- Núñez in 2024

Personal information
- Full name: Miryam Maritza Núñez Padilla
- Born: 10 August 1994 (age 32)

Cycling career
- Sport: Cycling
- Disciplines: Road; Track; Mountain biking
- Role: Rider

Amateur teams
- 2018: S.C. Michela Fanini Rox (guest)
- 2020–2021: Liro Sport Alcaldía de La Vega

Professional teams
- 2019: Swapit–Agolíco
- 2022–2023: Massi–Tactic
- 2024: Primeau Vélo - Groupe Abadie
Medal record
Women's track cycling
Representing Ecuador
Pan American Games
Silver medal – second place	2023 Santiago	Road race
Pan American Championships
Bronze medal – third place	2021 Lima	Madison

Miryam Maritza Núñez Padilla (born 10 August 1994) is an Ecuadorian professional racing cyclist, who last rode for UCI Women's Continental Team Primeau Vélo - Groupe Abadie. She rode in the women's road race at the 2015 UCI Road World Championships.

She won both the time trial and the road race at the 2019 Ecuadorian National Road Championships, and repeated the double in 2021 as the Championships were not held in 2020.

== Major results ==
2015
1st Time trial, National Road Championships
9th Time trial, Pan American Road Championships
2016
5th Copa Federación Venezolana de Ciclismo
2017
Bolivarian Games

3rd Omnium
3rd Points race

9th Time trial, Pan American Road Championships
2018
3rd Time trial, South American Games
6th Time trial, Pan American Road Championships
7th Overall Vuelta a Colombia Femenina
7th Gran Premio Comite Olimpico Nacional Femenino
8th Overall Vuelta Internacional Femenina a Costa Rica
2019
National Road Championships

1st Road race
1st Time trial

5th Overall Vuelta Femenina a Guatemala

1st Mountains classification

7th Time trial, Pan American Road Championships
2020
1st Overall Vuelta a Colombia Femenina
2021
National Road Championships

1st Road race
1st Time trial

2nd Overall Vuelta Femenina a Guatemala
3rd Madison, Pan American Track Championships (with Dayana Aguilar)
3rd Overall Vuelta a Colombia Femenina

1st Stage 6

4th Time trial, Pan American Road Championships
2022
Bolivarian Games

1st Time trial
2nd Road race

National Mountain Bike Championships

1st Cross-country
1st Cross-country eliminator
2nd Cross-country short track

2023
National Road Championships

1st Time trial
4th Road race

2nd Road race, Pan American Games
6th Overall Giro della Toscana Int. Femminile – Memorial Michela Fanini
2024
National Road Championships

1st Road race
1st Time trial

8th Poreč Trophy
2025
National Road Championships

1st Time trial
