= Cycling at the 2011 Pan American Games – Men's road race =

Men's road race at the 2011 Pan American Games
- Venue: Guadalajara Circuit
- Dates: October 22
- Competitors: 53 from 21 nations

Medalists
Gold medal	Marc de Maar	Netherlands Antilles
Silver medal	Miguel Ubeto	Venezuela
Bronze medal	Arnold Alcolea	Cuba

The men's road race competition of the cycling events at the 2011 Pan American Games was held on October 22 at the Guadalajara Circuit in Guadalajara. The defending Pan American Games champion was Wendy Cruz of the Dominican Republic.

== Schedule ==
All times are Central Standard Time (UTC−6).

Date	Time	Round
October 22, 2011	12:00	Final

== Results ==
53 competitors from 21 countries competed.

Rank	Rider	Time
1st place, gold medalist(s)	Marc de Maar (AHO)	3:40:53
2nd place, silver medalist(s)	Miguel Ubeto (VEN)	3:40:53
3rd place, bronze medalist(s)	Arnold Alcolea (CUB)	3:41:48
4	Cristóbal Olavarría (CHI)	3:41:48
5	Juan Arango (COL)	3:41:48
6	Segundo Navarrete (ECU)	3:41:56
7	Juan Carlos López (COL)	3:41:59
8	Yans Arias (CUB)	3:42:04
9	Byron Guamá (ECU)	3:43:55
10	Bernardo Colex (MEX)	3:44:17
11	Guillaume Boivin (CAN)	3:44:17
12	Honorio Machado (VEN)	3:45:02
13	Rafael Andriato (BRA)	3:45:02
14	Lizardo Benitez (CUB)	3:45:04
15	Darren Matthews (BAR)	3:45:04
16	Walter Perez (ARG)	3:45:04
17	Carlos Hernández (GUA)	3:45:04
18	Manuel Rodas (GUA)	3:45:04
19	Iván Casas (COL)	3:45:04
20	Gonzalo Garrido (CHI)	3:45:06
21	Artur García (VEN)	3:45:06
22	Wendy Cruz (DOM)	3:45:06
23	Ignacio Sarabia (MEX)	3:45:06
24	Gregolry Panizo (BRA)	3:45:06
25	Weimar Roldán (COL)	3:45:14
26	Tomás Gil (VEN)	3:50:58
27	Deiber Esquivel (CRC)	3:50:58
28	Federico Ramirez (CRC)	3:50:58
29	Luis Fernando Macías (MEX)	3:50:58
30	Robert Britton (CAN)	3:50:58
31	Gregory Brenes (CRC)	3:50:58
32	Rémi Pelletier (CAN)	3:50:58
33	Ramon Martin (CUB)	3:50:58
34	Luis Mansilla (CHI)	3:50:58
35	Leandro Messineo (ARG)	3:50:58
36	Jorge Giacinti (ARG)	3:50:58
37	Nelson Sanchez (DOM)	3:50:58
38	José Ragonessi (ECU)	3:50:58
39	Andrey Sartasov (CHI)	3:50:58
40	Robert Marsh (ATG)	4:02:22
–	Murilo Fischer (BRA)	DNF
–	Marlon Perez (COL)	DNF
–	Emile Abraham (TRI)	DNF
–	Carlos Quishpe (ECU)	DNF
–	Matías Médici (ARG)	DNF
–	Jean-Michel Lachance (CAN)	DNF
–	Dominic Ollivierre (VIN)	DNF
–	Luiz Tavares (BRA)	DNF
–	Marloe Rodman (JAM)	DNF
–	Fidel Mangal (LCA)	DNF
–	Jorge Pérez (DOM)	DNF
–	Wilfrid Camelia (AHO)	DNF
–	Charli Quiñonez (ESA)	DNF
