= Jhonatan Narváez =

Ecuadorian cyclist (born 1997)

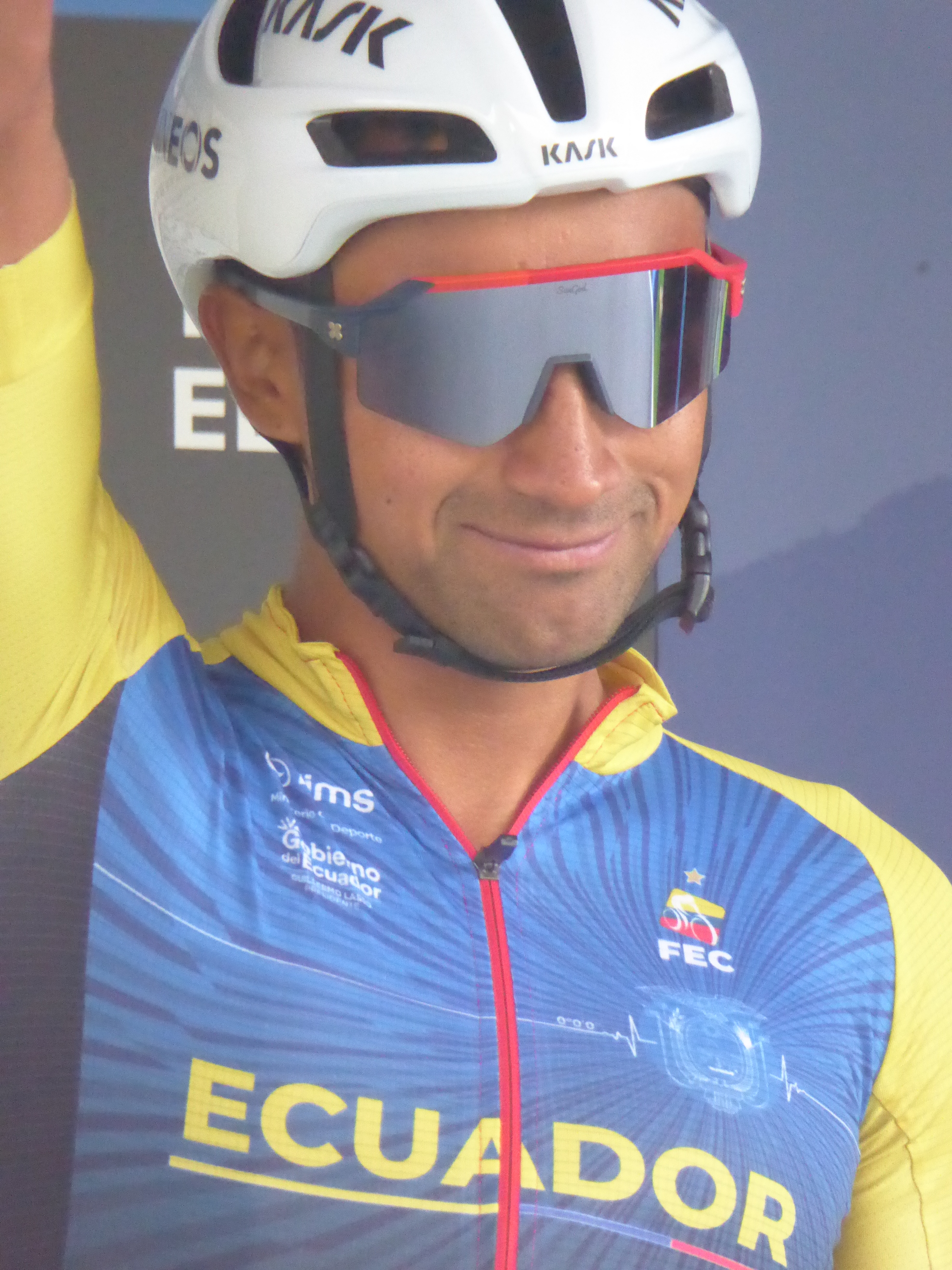
- Narváez at the 2023 UCI Road World Championships

Personal information
- Full name: Jhonatan Manuel Narváez Prado
- Nickname: El Lagarto (The Alligator)
- Born: 4 March 1997 (age 29) Sucumbíos Canton, Ecuador
- Height: 1.74 m (5 ft 9 in)

Cycling career
- Sport: Cycling
- Current team: UAE Team Emirates XRG
- Discipline: Road
- Role: Rider
- Rider type: Puncheur, Classics specialist

Professional teams
- 2016: Klein Constantia
- 2017: Axeon–Hagens Berman
- 2018: Quick-Step Floors
- 2019–2024: Team Sky
- 2025–: UAE Team Emirates XRG

Major wins
- Grand Tours Giro d'Italia 5 individual stages (2020, 2024, 2026) Stage races Tour Down Under (2025) One-day races and classics National Road Race Championships (2017, 2024, 2025)
Medal record
Representing Ecuador
Men's road cycling
Pan American Games
Gold medal – first place	2023 Santiago	Road race

Jhonatan Manuel Narváez Prado (born 4 March 1997) is an Ecuadorian professional road racing cyclist, who currently rides for UCI WorldTeam UAE Team Emirates XRG. He has had success at the Giro d'Italia, winning stages in 2020, 2024, and 2026.

== Career ==
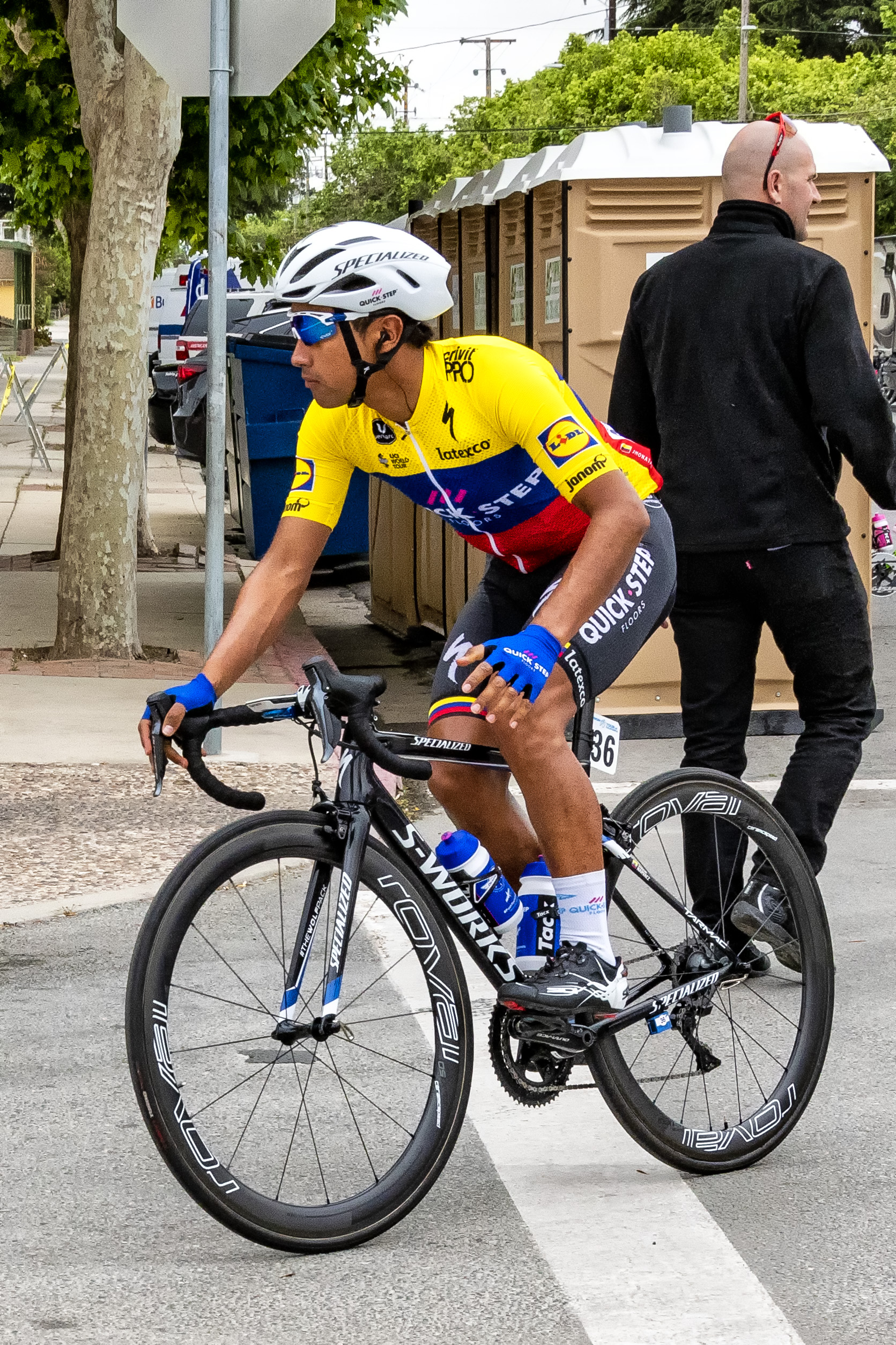
Narvaez in 2018

=== Early career ===
Originally from El Playón de San Francisco, situated at an altitude of 2,990 meters, in Ecuador's Sucumbíos Canton, whilst at school Narváez was a member of a cycling club founded by one of his teachers, former Olympic racing cyclist Juan Carlos Rosero. The club has also produced a number of other professional riders, including Richard Carapaz and Jonathan Caicedo. Narváez became a multiple-time Pan American Junior champion in 2015. For 2016, Narváez competed for Klein Constantia.

Narváez started the 2017 season competing in the Volta ao Alentejo. He won the Circuit des Ardennes with two stage runner-up finishes, despite a fall in the final stage. He was the youngest winner of the event in a decade.

=== UCI World Tour ===
In 2018, Narváez joined UCI WorldTeam Quick-Step Floors on a three-year contract, making him one of only two Ecuadorians in the World Tour. In late 2018, Narváez broke his three-year contract with Quick-Step Floors to join Team Sky for the 2019 season.

He was named in the startlist for the 2019 Giro d'Italia. He finished the race in 80th place. The following year he once again competed in the Giro; although he did not finish the race, he did win a stage; stage 12, which was an intermediate/hilly stage. Narváez finished just over a minute ahead of Mark Padun and nearly seven minutes ahead of 3rd place Simon Clarke.

In 2023, Narváez won the overall classification as well as three stages of the Tour of Austria, in addition to his second National Road Race Championship title.

Narváez opened 2024 with a win at the Down Under Classic before going on to finish second overall at the Tour Down Under. In May, he outsprinted Tadej Pogačar and Max Schachmann to win the opening stage of the Giro d'Italia, taking the maglia rosa in the process. However, he lost the race lead to Pogačar the following day.

From 2025, Narváez rides for UAE Team Emirates, having signed a two-year contract.

== Major results ==
2014
2nd Road race, Pan American Junior Road Championships
2015
Pan American Junior Track Championships

1st Individual pursuit
1st Points race

Pan American Junior Road Championships

2nd Road race
3rd Time trial

2016
1st Time trial, National Under-23 Road Championships
2nd Time trial, Pan American Under-23 Road Championships
5th Overall Tour de Savoie Mont Blanc

1st Mountains classification

2017 (1 pro win)
1st Road race, National Road Championships
1st Overall Circuit des Ardennes

1st Young rider classification

1st Young rider classification, Colorado Classic
6th Overall Tour of the Gila

1st Young rider classification
1st Stage 5

2018
1st Stage 1 (TTT) Adriatica Ionica Race
2nd Road race, National Road Championships
2nd La Drôme Classic
5th Overall Tour de Wallonie
6th Classic Sud-Ardèche
7th Dwars door West–Vlaanderen
10th Overall Colombia Oro y Paz
2020 (3)
1st Overall Settimana Internazionale di Coppi e Bartali

1st Points classification
1st Young rider classification
1st Stage 3

1st Stage 12 Giro d'Italia
8th Overall Tour de Wallonie

1st Young rider classification

10th Gran Trittico Lombardo
2021
9th Nokere Koerse
2022
4th Hamburg Cyclassics
6th Strade Bianche
6th E3 Saxo Bank Classic
2023 (5)
1st Road race, Pan American Games
1st Overall Tour of Austria

1st Points classification
1st Stages 2, 3 & 5

2024 (2)
1st Road race, National Road Championships
Giro d'Italia

1st Stage 1
Held & after Stage 1

1st Down Under Classic
2nd Overall Tour Down Under
5th Clásica de San Sebastián
5th Cadel Evans Great Ocean Road Race
6th E3 Saxo Classic
Combativity award Stage 14 Vuelta a España
2025 (4)
1st Road race, National Road Championships
1st Overall Tour Down Under

1st Stage 5

2nd Overall Deutschland Tour

1st Stage 2

3rd Overall Tour of Guangxi
9th Overall Tour de Luxembourg
2026 (4)
Giro d'Italia

1st Stages 4, 8 & 11
Held after Stages 14 & 17

1st Stage 3 Tour de Suisse
7th Overall Tour of Guangxi
9th Gran Piemonte
9th Tre Valli Varesine

=== Grand Tour general classification results timeline ===
Grand Tour	2019	2020	2021	2022	2023	2024	2025	2026
Giro d'Italia	80	DNF	49	42	—	28	—	DNF
Tour de France	—	—	—	—	—	—	13	—
Vuelta a España	—	—	DNF	—	—	50	—	—

=== Classics results timeline ===
Monument	2018	2019	2020	2021	2022	2023	2024	2025	2026
Milan–San Remo	—	—	—	—	—	32	35	85	—
Tour of Flanders	—	—	—	—	52	25	—	DNF	—
Paris–Roubaix	Has not contested in his career								
Liège–Bastogne–Liège	Has not contested in his career								
Giro di Lombardia	Has not contested in his career								
Classic	2018	2019	2020	2021	2022	2023	2024	2025	2026
Omloop Het Nieuwsblad	—	—	—	39	34	—	—	43	—
Strade Bianche	—	—	DNF	—	6	—	—	—	—
E3 Saxo Bank Classic	—	—	NH	DNF	6	82	6	—	—
Gent–Wevelgem	—	—	—	—	DNF	13	DNF	—	—
Clásica de San Sebastián	49	—	NH	—	—	72	5	—	35
Hamburg Cyclassics	—	—	Not held		4	—	—	—	—
Tre Valli Varesine	—	—	—	—	DNF	—	—	—	9
Gran Piemonte	—	—	—	—	117	—	—	—	9

Legend
—	Did not compete
DNF	Did not finish
NH	Not held
