= Jonathan Caicedo =

Ecuadorian cyclist

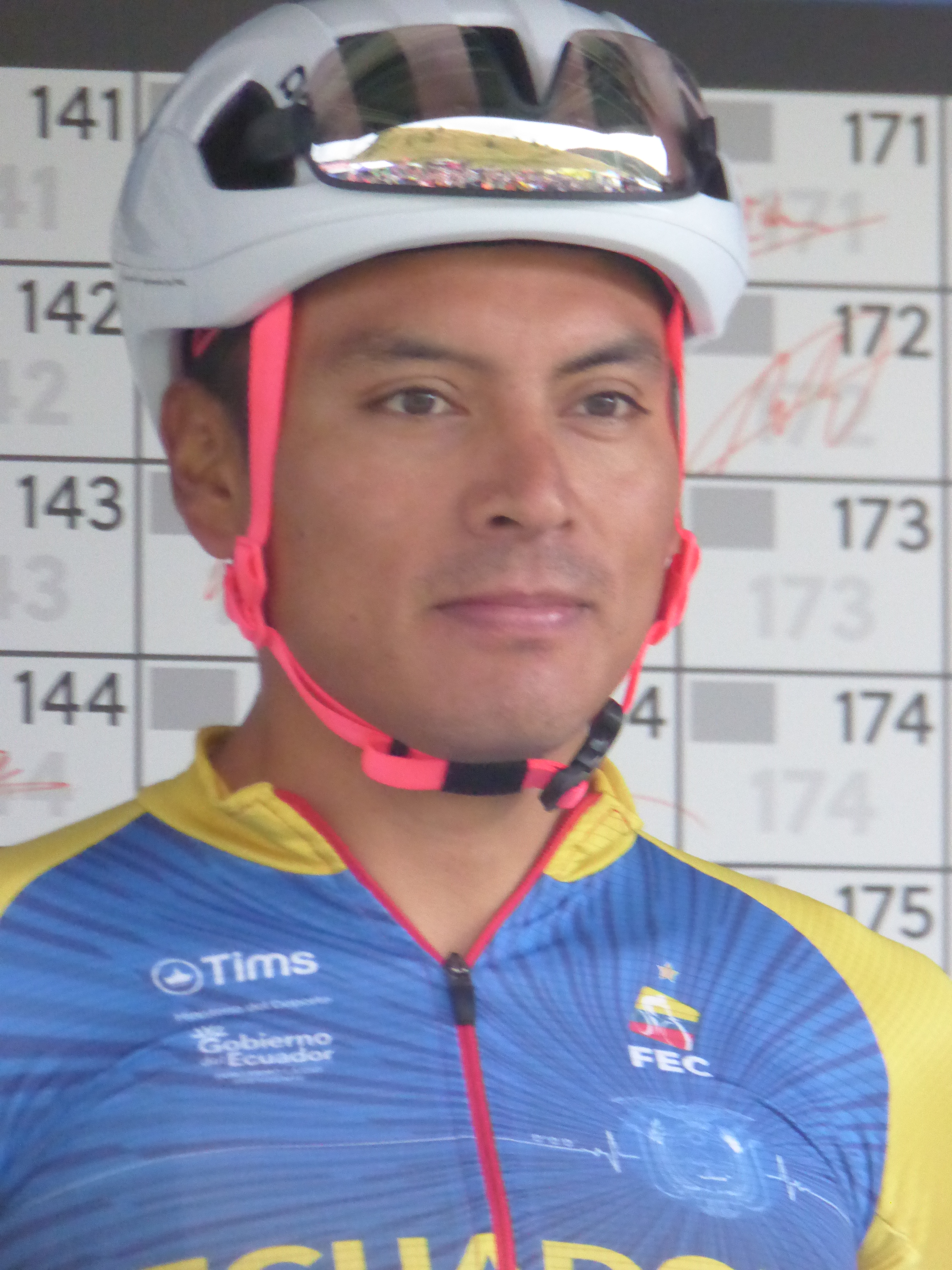

Personal information
- Full name: Jonathan Kléver Caicedo Cepeda
- Nickname: Cubanito (Little Cuban)
- Born: 28 April 1993 (age 33) Tulcán Canton, Ecuador
- Height: 1.62 m (5 ft 4 in)
- Weight: 64 kg (141 lb)

Cycling career
- Sport: Cycling
- Current team: Wheeltop Rotor Chengdu Team
- Discipline: Road
- Role: Rider

Professional teams
- 2014: Team Ecuador
- 2016–2017: Strongman–Campagnolo–Wilier
- 2018: Medellín
- 2019–2023: EF Education First
- 2024–2026: Petrolike
- 2026-: Wheeltop Rotor Chengdu Team

Major wins
- Grand Tours Giro d'Italia 1 individual stage (2020) One-day races and classics National Road Race Championships (2019) National Time Trial Championships (2015, 2019, 2023, 2026)
Medal record
Men's road bicycle racing
Representing Ecuador
Pan American Championships
Gold medal – first place	2016 San Cristóbal	Road race

Jonathan Kléver Caicedo Cepeda (born 28 April 1993) is an Ecuadorian professional road racing cyclist, who currently rides for UCI Continental team Wheeltop Rotor Chengdu Team.

== Career ==
Caicedo is from the town of Santa Martha de Cuba in Ecuador's Tulcán Canton, from which he gets his nickname, Cubanito ("Little Cuban"). Whilst at school, Caicedo was a member of a cycling club founded by one of his teachers, former Olympic racing cyclist Juan Carlos Rosero. The club has also produced a number of other professional riders, including Richard Carapaz and Jhonatan Narváez. Prior to joining EF for 2019, he rode for the Colombian teams Bicicletas Strongman and Medellín.

In May 2019, he was named in the startlist for the 2019 Giro d'Italia. The following month, he won both the road race and the time trial in the Ecuadorian National Road Championships. Caicedo was again selected by EF for the 2020 Giro d'Italia, where he won the race's third stage, forming part of the day's early breakaway before dropping the remainder of the breakaway riders alongside Giovanni Visconti in the closing stages before dropping Visconti with an attack and reaching the summit finish on Mount Etna alone, additionally taking the lead in the mountains classification.

After his contract at EF were now renewed at the end of 2023, he joined Mexican Continental team Petrolike. Amid financial troubles at the team, Caicedo rescinds his contract in the middle of 2026, joining Chinese Continental team Wheeltop Chengdu.

== Major results ==
2015 (1 pro win)
National Road Championships

1st Time trial
3rd Road race

2016 (1)
1st Road race, Pan American Road Championships
1st Stage 12 Vuelta a Costa Rica
2nd Time trial, National Road Championships
2017
4th Overall Vuelta a Colombia
2018
1st Overall Vuelta a Colombia
2nd Overall Vuelta a Asturias

1st Points classification

3rd Overall Vuelta a la Comunidad de Madrid
6th Winston-Salem Cycling Classic
2019 (2)
National Road Championships

1st Road race
1st Time trial

4th Overall Adriatica Ionica Race
2020 (1)
Giro d'Italia

1st Stage 3
Held after Stages 3–4

3rd Overall Tour Colombia

1st Stage 1 (TTT)

2022
3rd Road race, National Road Championships
4th Overall Vuelta a Castilla y León
South American Games

5th Time trial
6th Road race

2023 (1)
1st Time trial, National Road Championships
2024 (1)
1st Overall Vuelta al Tachira

1st Stage 4

1st Overall Vuelta Bantrab

1st Mountains classification
1st Stages 2 & 4

1st Stage 3 Sibiu Cycling Tour
3rd Overall Tour Colombia
5th Giro dell'Appennino
2025
1st Stage 7 Volta a Portugal
Bolivarian Games

2nd Time trial
2nd Road race

7th Overall Tour of Magnificent Qinghai
7th Overall Oberösterreich Rundfahrt
7th Andorra MoraBanc Clàssica
10th Coppa Città di San Daniele
2026
National Road Championships

1st Time trial

1st Overall Tour of Magnificent Qinghai

=== Grand Tour general classification results timeline ===
Grand Tour	2019	2020	2021	2022	2023
Giro d'Italia	108	65	DNF	DNF	DNF
Tour de France	—	—	—	—	—
Vuelta a España	—	—	DNF	69	47

Legend
—	Did not compete
DNF	Did not finish
IP	In progress
