= Jefferson Alexander Cepeda =

Ecuadorian cyclist

Jefferson Cepeda
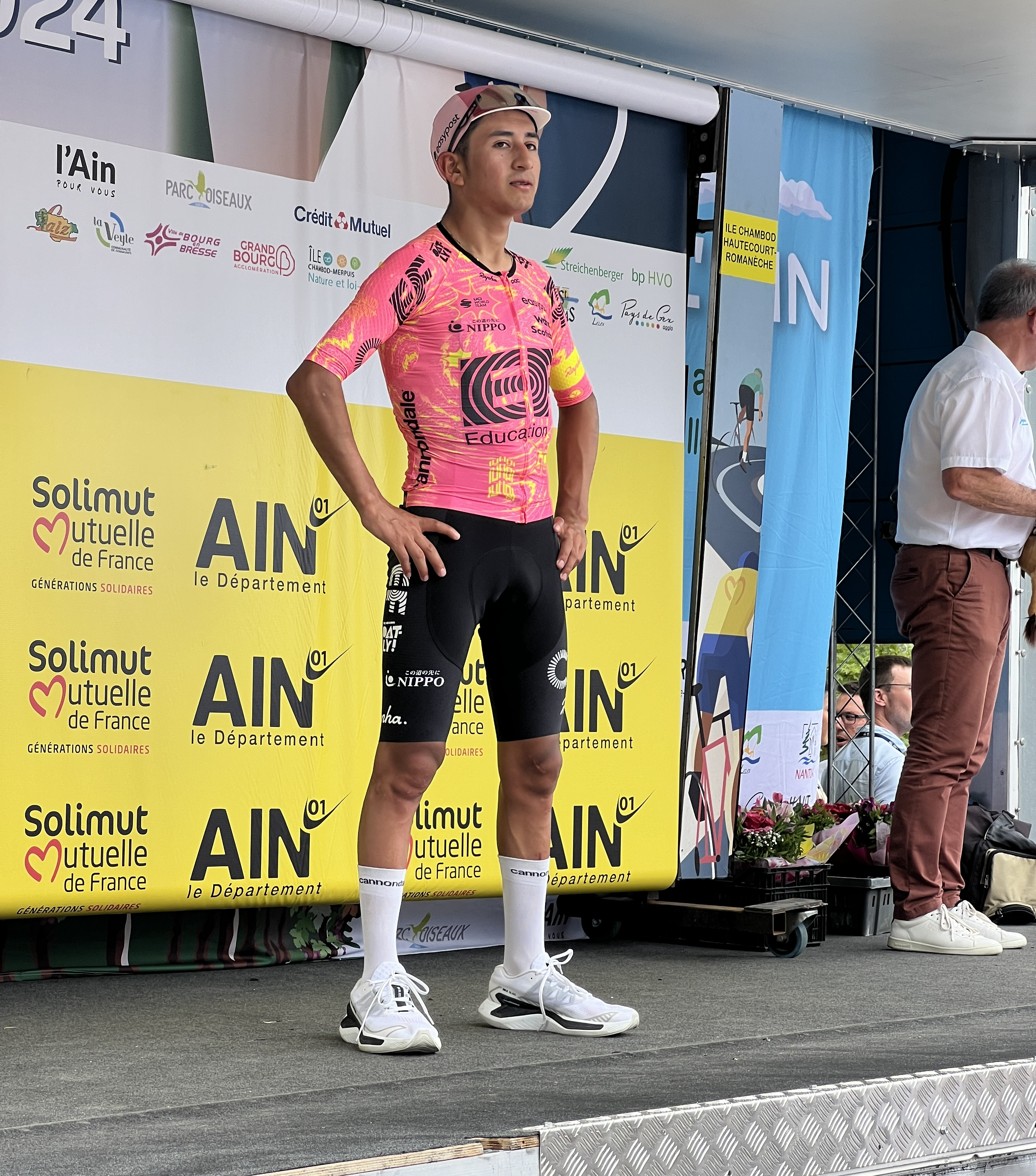
- Cepeda in 2024

Personal information
- Full name: Jefferson Alexander Cepeda Ortiz
- Born: 16 June 1998 (age 28) El Playón de San Francisco, Sucumbíos Canton, Sucumbíos Province, Ecuador
- Height: 1.64 m (5 ft 5 in)
- Weight: 56 kg (123 lb)

Cycling career
- Sport: Cycling
- Current team: EF Education–EasyPost
- Discipline: Road
- Role: Rider
- Rider type: Climber

Amateur teams
- 2019: Coraje Carchense
- 2019: Avinal–GW–El Carmen de Viboral

Professional teams
- 2017–2018: Team Ecuador
- 2020–2022: Androni Giocattoli–Sidermec
- 2022–: EF Education–EasyPost

Major wins
- One-day races and classics National Road Race Championships (2021)

Jefferson Alexander Cepeda Ortiz (born 16 June 1998) is an Ecuadorian cyclist, who currently rides for UCI WorldTeam EF Education–EasyPost. One of his cousins, also named Jefferson Cepeda, is also a professional road cyclist, on Movistar Team.

== Career ==
In October 2020, he was named in the startlist for the 2020 Giro d'Italia. On 1 August 2022 Cepeda joined EF Education–EasyPost on a three-year contract from Drone Hopper–Androni Giocattoli. His first race in the EF Education–EasyPost colors will be the Deutschland Tour.

== Major results ==
2017
2nd Time trial, National Under-23 Road Championships
4th Time trial, National Road Championships
2018
National Under-23 Road Championships

1st Time trial
3rd Road race

5th Time trial, Pan American Under-23 Road Championships
6th Road race, South American Games
2019
1st Stage 4 Clásico RCN
National Road Championships

2nd Road race
3rd Time trial

3rd Road race, Pan American Under-23 Road Championships
9th Overall Tour de l'Avenir

1st Stage 10

2020
10th Overall Tour de Savoie Mont-Blanc
2021 (1 pro win)
1st Road race, National Road Championships
1st Overall Tour de Savoie Mont-Blanc

1st Points classification
1st Stage 2

4th Overall Tour of the Alps

1st Young rider classification

2022
2nd Overall Giro di Sicilia

1st Young rider classification

2023 (1)
1st Stage 2 Tour de l'Ain
2nd Overall Tour de Langkawi
3rd Time trial, National Road Championships
4th Overall Tour of the Alps
7th Trofeo Laigueglia
2024 (2)
1st Overall Tour de l'Ain

1st Stage 2

2025
2nd Road race, National Road Championships
7th Milano–Torino
2026
6th Milano–Torino

=== Grand Tour general classification results timeline ===
Grand Tour	2020	2021	2022	2023	2024	2025
Giro d'Italia	78	DNF	DNF	53	71	
Tour de France	—	—	—	—	—	
Vuelta a España	—	—	—	—	46	

Legend
—	Did not compete
DNF	Did not finish
