= Santiago Montenegro =

Ecuadorian cyclist

Personal information
- Full name: Jimmy Santiago Montenegro Narváez
- Born: 15 May 1998 (age 28) El Playón de San Francisco, Sucumbíos Province, Ecuador

Cycling career
- Sport: Cycling
- Current team: Best PC Ecuador
- Discipline: Road
- Role: Rider

Amateur team
- 2020–2021: Escribano Sport

Professional teams
- 2017–2019: Team Ecuador
- 2021–: Best PC Ecuador

Jimmy Santiago Montenegro Narváez (born 15 May 1998) is an Ecuadorian road cyclist, who currently rides for UCI Continental team Best PC Ecuador.

He won the Under-23 road race at the 2019 Pan American Championships held in Lima, Peru. In July 2021, he was confirmed to be on the Ecuadorian team for the time trial at the 2020 Summer Olympics.

== Major results ==
2017
1st Road race, National Under-23 Road Championships
2018
5th Time trial, National Road Championships
10th Road race Pan American Under-23 Road Championships
2019
Pan American Under-23 Road Championships

1st Road race
9th Time trial

National Under-23 Road Championships

2nd Road race
3rd Time trial

3rd Overall Tour de l'Espoir
5th Overall Vuelta a Miranda

1st Mountains classification

9th Overall Vuelta a Venezuela
2020
1st Overall Vuelta al Ecuador

1st Young rider classification

2021
1st Stage 4 Vuelta al Ecuador
2022
1st Mountains classification, Vuelta a Colombia
3rd Overall Vuelta al Ecuador

1st Mountains classification
1st Stages 1, 6 & 8

3rd Overall Vuelta a Guatemala

1st Stage 7

4th Time trial, National Road Championships
Pan American Road Championships

7th Road race
7th Time trial

2023
3rd Overall Tour de Catamarca Internacional

1st Stage 1

5th Time trial, National Road Championships
9th Time trial Pan American Road Championships
