= Héctor Chiles =

Ecuadorian cyclist

Personal information
- Full name: Héctor Rubén Chiles Huaca
- Born: 11 February 1971 (age 55) Carchi, Ecuador

Cycling career
- Sport: Cycling
- Current team: Retired
- Discipline: Road
- Role: Rider

Amateur team
- 2012: Carchi Somos Ecuador

Professional teams
- 1992: Pony Malta–Avianca
- 1996: Pony Malta–Avianca
Medal record
Men's road bicycle racing
Representing Ecuador
Pan American Championships
| Bronze medal – third place | 2002 Quito | Road race |

Héctor Rubén Chiles Huaca (born 11 February 1971) is an Ecuadorian former cyclist. He competed in the men's individual road race at the 1996 Summer Olympics.

== Major results ==
1992
1st Road race, Pan American Road Championships
1997
1st Overall Vuelta al Ecuador
2001
1st Overall Vuelta al Ecuador
2002
1st Overall Vuelta al Ecuador
3rd Road race, Pan American Road Championships
2005
1st Overall Vuelta al Ecuador

1st Stage 9

2007
3rd Time trial, National Road Championships
2009
1st Stage 5 Vuelta al Ecuador
