= José Ragonessi =

Ecuadorian cyclist (born 1984)

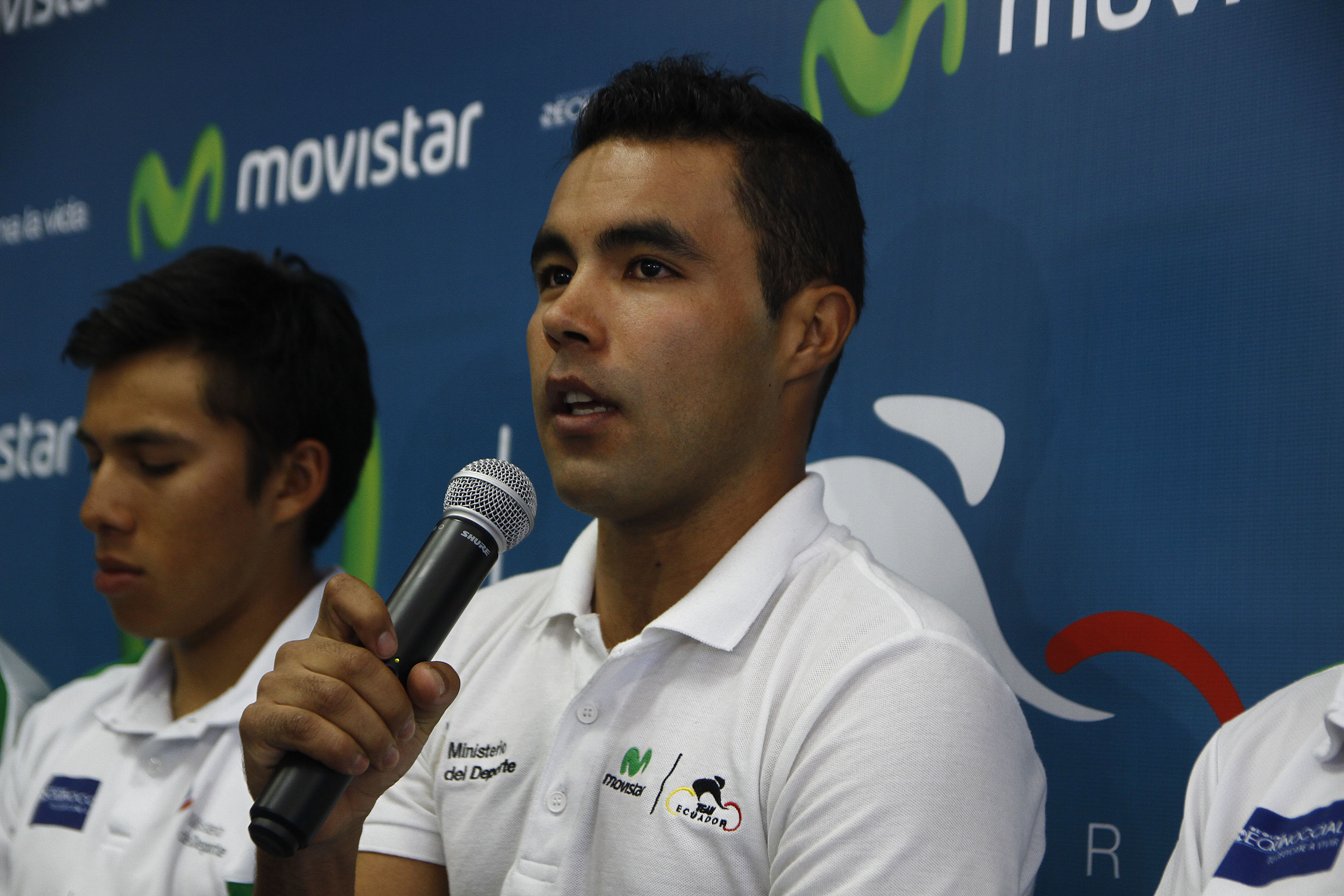
- Ragonessi in 2014

Personal information
- Full name: José Carlos Ragonessi Guzmán
- Born: 11 December 1984 (age 41)

Cycling career
- Sport: Cycling
- Disciplines: Road; Track
- Role: Rider

Professional team
- 2014–2019: Team Ecuador

José Carlos Ragonessi Guzmán (born 11 December 1984) is an Ecuadorian cyclist, who most recently rode for UCI Continental team Team Ecuador.

== Major results ==
2006
1st Stage 3 Vuelta al Ecuador
2007
3rd Road race, National Road Championships
2009
2nd Time trial, National Road Championships
2010
National Road Championships

1st Road race
2nd Time trial

2011
National Road Championships

1st Time trial
2nd Road race

2012
3rd Madison, Pan American Track Championships (with Byron Guamá)
10th Overall Tour de Guadeloupe
2013
7th Time trial, Pan American Road Championships
2014
1st Time trial, National Road Championships
6th Time trial, Pan American Road Championships
2015
1st Road race, National Road Championships
2016
1st Road race, National Road Championships
