= Byron Guamá =

Ecuadorian racing cyclist

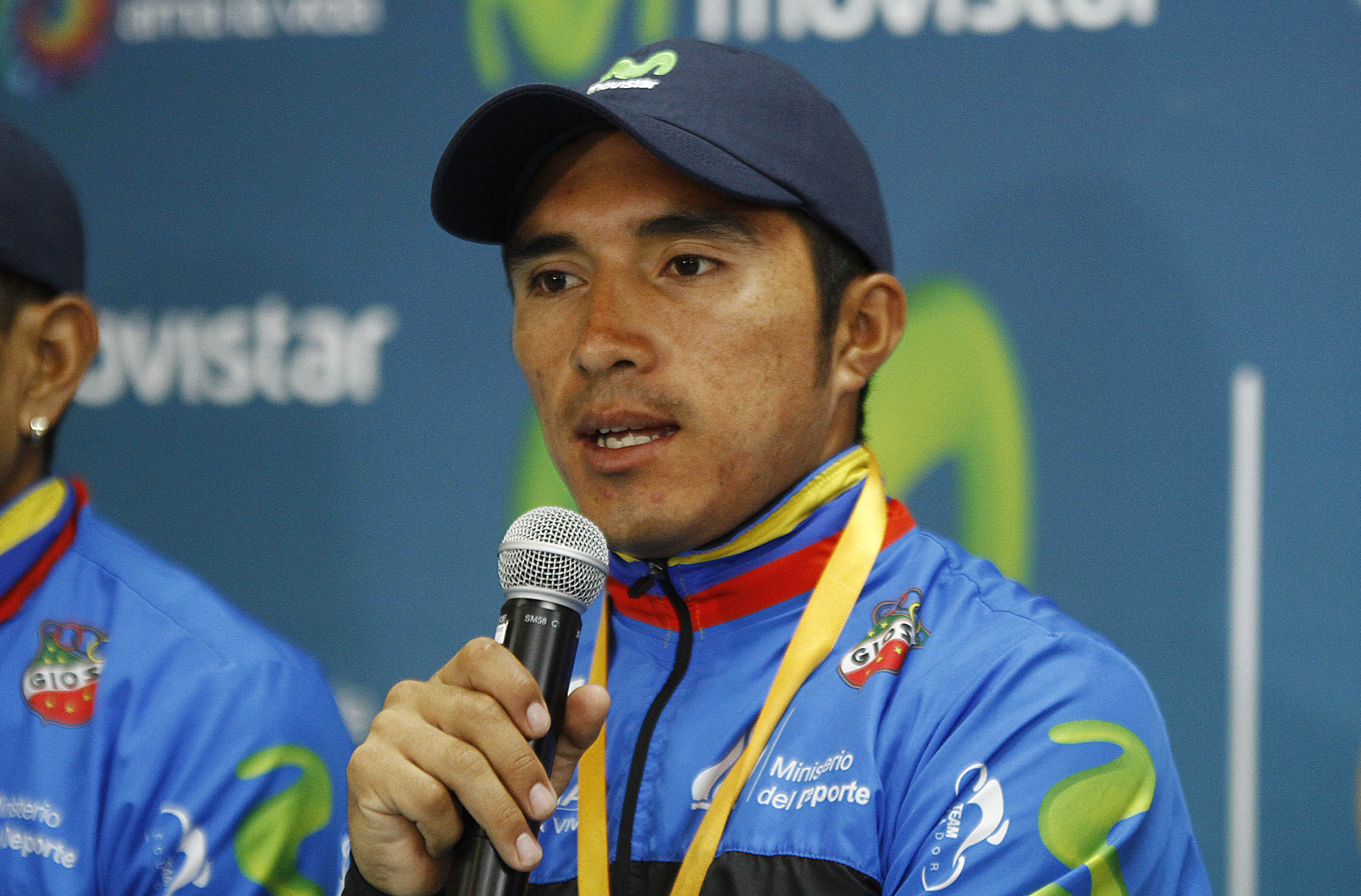
- Guamá in 2015

Personal information
- Full name: Byron Patricio Guamá de la Cruz
- Born: 14 June 1985 (age 41) Espejo, Ecuador
- Height: 170 cm (5 ft 7 in)
- Weight: 61 kg (134 lb)

Cycling career
- Sport: Cycling
- Current team: Best PC Ecuador
- Discipline: Road
- Role: Rider

Amateur team
- 2008: Canel's Turbo–Mayordomo

Professional teams
- 2009–2010: Burgos Monumental–Castilla y León
- 2011–2013: Movistar Continental Team
- 2014–2019: Team Ecuador
- 2020–: Best PC Ecuador
Medal record
Men's road bicycle racing
Representing Ecuador
Pan American Championships
Gold medal – first place	2014 Puebla	Road race
Gold medal – first place	2015 León	Road race

Byron Patricio Guamá de la Cruz (born 14 June 1985) is an Ecuadorian road bicycle racer, who currently competes for UCI Continental team Best PC Ecuador. He competed at the 2012 Summer Olympics in the Men's road race.

== Major results ==
2003
5th Road race, Pan American Junior Road Championships
2004
1st Overall Vuelta al Ecuador
5th Time trial, Pan American Under-23 Road Championships
2006
6th Overall Vuelta a Guatemala

1st Stage 2

2007
1st Road race, National Road Championships
1st Stage 10 Vuelta a Guatemala
7th Overall Vuelta al Ecuador

1st Stage 5

2008
1st Overall Doble Sucre Potosí GP Cemento Fancesa

1st Stages 1 & 2

1st Overall Vuelta al Ecuador

1st Stages 1, 2, 5 & 9

9th Overall Vuelta a Chihuahua

1st Stage 3

2009
4th Overall Vuelta al Ecuador

1st Stages 1 & 2

6th Overall Vuelta a Guatemala

1st Stages 4 & 8

2010
1st Overall Vuelta al Ecuador

1st Points classification
1st Stages 1 & 4

4th Overall Vuelta a Bolivia
2011
Vuelta a Colombia

1st Stages 4 & 8

9th Road race, Pan American Games
10th Road race, Pan American Road Championships
2012
1st Stage 8 Vuelta a Colombia
1st Stage 2 Vuelta Mundo Maya
3rd Overall Tour do Rio
2013
Vuelta a Colombia

1st Stages 2 & 10

4th Road race, Pan American Road Championships
4th Overall Vuelta a Guatemala
2014
1st Road race, Pan American Road Championships
National Road Championships

1st Road race
2nd Time trial

6th Overall Volta ao Alentejo

1st Mountains classification
1st Stage 1

2015
1st Road race, Pan American Road Championships
1st Overall Volta Ciclística Internacional do Rio Grande do Sul

1st Stages 3 & 4

1st Stage 5 Vuelta a Venezuela
1st Mountains classification Volta ao Alentejo
7th Road race, Pan American Games
8th Overall Vuelta Mexico Telmex

1st Stage 5

2016
1st Stage 8 Vuelta a Venezuela
5th Overall Vuelta a Guatemala

1st Stage 7

9th Overall Volta Ciclística Internacional do Rio Grande do Sul

1st Stage 3

2017
3rd Road race, National Road Championships
6th Overall Vuelta a la Independencia Nacional
7th Overall Vuelta a Guatemala

1st Stages 7 & 8

2018
1st Stage 9 Vuelta a Venezuela
4th Road race, South American Games
2019
4th Time trial, National Road Championships
5th Overall Vuelta Ciclista a Costa Rica

1st Points classification
1st Stage 1

6th Road race, Pan American Road Championships
2020
3rd Overall Vuelta a Guatemala

1st Points classification
1st Mountains classification

8th Overall Vuelta al Ecuador

1st Stages 2, 3 & 5

2021
2nd Road race, National Road Championships
3rd Overall Vuelta al Ecuador
2022
4th Road race, National Road Championships
2023
1st Stage 3 Vuelta a Colombia
2nd Overall Vuelta a Guatemala

1st Points classification

4th Overall Vuelta al Ecuador
5th Road race, Pan American Road Championships
7th Overall Vuelta Ciclista a Costa Rica

1st Stage 7

2024
1st Stage 3 Vuelta a Guatemala
4th Overall Vuelta al Ecuador
8th Overall Vuelta Ciclista a Costa Rica

1st Stage 4
