= Movistar–Best PC =

Ecuadorian cycling team

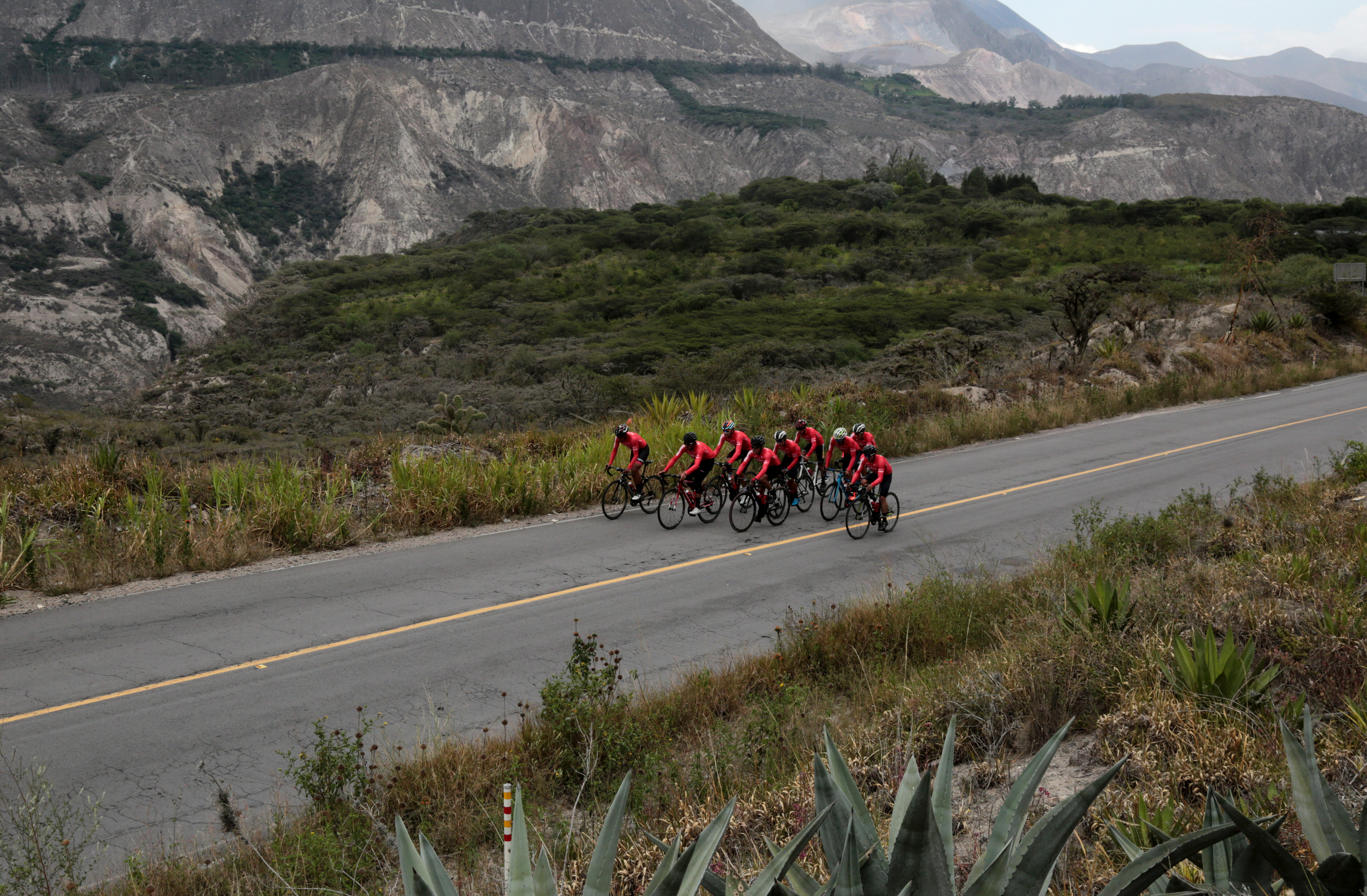
- Team Best

Team information
- UCI code: MBP
- Registered: Ecuador
- Founded: 2019
- Discipline: Road
- Status: UCI Continental (2020–)

Key personnel
- General manager: Juan Andrade Sarmiento
- Team manager: Anderson Padilla

Team name history
- 2019 2020–2021 2022–: Team Best PC; Best PC Ecuador; Movistar–Best PC

Movistar–Best PC is an Ecuadorian cycling team established in 2019. In its first season at UCI Continental level in 2020, the team took two stage victories at the Vuelta a Guatemala, and three stage victories at the Vuelta al Ecuador.

== Team roster ==
As of 8 February 2023.

Rider	Date of birth
Juan Diego Alba (COL)	11 September 1997 (age 28)
Pablo Caicedo (ECU)	12 October 1986 (age 39)
Joel Fuertes (ECU)	11 June 1999 (age 27)
Carlos Gálviz (VEN)	27 October 1989 (age 36)
Byron Guamá (ECU)	14 June 1985 (age 41)
Richard Huera (ECU)	25 April 1999 (age 27)

Rider	Date of birth
Mateo López (ECU)	5 October 2004 (age 21)
Jhonatan Byron Montenegro (ECU)	21 November 2002 (age 23)
Santiago Montenegro (ECU)	15 May 1998 (age 28)
Sebastián Novoa (ECU)	6 November 1992 (age 33)
Paulo Pantoja (COL)	2 January 2003 (age 23)
Marco Tulio Suesca (COL)	11 August 1994 (age 32)

== Major wins ==
2020
Stages 6 & 8 Vuelta a Guatemala, Harold Martín López
Stages 2, 3 & 5 Vuelta al Ecuador, Byron Guamá

2021
Stage 6 Vuelta al Tachira, Anderson Timoteo Paredes
Stage 3 Vuelta al Ecuador, Sebastián Novoa
Stage 4 Vuelta al Ecuador, Santiago Montenegro
