= Juan Carlos Rosero =

Ecuadorian cyclist

Personal information
- Born: 28 November 1962 Quito Canton, Ecuador
- Died: 23 January 2013 (aged 50) Tulcán, Ecuador

Cycling career
- Sport: Cycling

Juan Carlos Rosero García (28 November 1962 – 23 January 2013) was an Ecuadorian professional road racing cyclist, who competed for his native country at the 1992 Summer Olympics in Barcelona, Spain. After retiring from competition, Rosero became a teacher: he also became a mentor to Richard Carapaz, Ecuador's first European-based professional cyclist and Grand Tour winner, through a cycling club he founded at the school where he was teaching; the club has also produced a number of other professional riders, including Jhonatan Narváez and Jonathan Caicedo. Born in Tumbaco, Quito Canton, Rosero died in Tulcán.

== Career ==
1986
1st in General Classification Vuelta Ciclista a la Republica del Ecuador (ECU)
1987
1st in General Classification Vuelta a Mendoza (ARG)
1989
1st in General Classification Vuelta Ciclista a la Republica del Ecuador (ECU)
1991
2nd in General Classification Vuelta al Táchira (VEN)
1992
1st in General Classification Vuelta a Boyacá (COL)
1st in General Classification Vuelta Ciclista a la Republica del Ecuador (ECU)
43rd in Olympic Games, Road, Amateurs, Sant Sadurni d'Anoia, Barcelona (ESP)
5th in General Classification Vuelta a Colombia (COL)
1993
1st in Stage 13 Vuelta a Colombia, Pamplona (COL)
