= Abici =

Italian bicycle manufacturer

Coordinates: 44.9361721°N 10.4928869°E

- Industry: Bicycle industry
- Founded: 2006
- Founder: Giuseppe Marcheselli, Stefano Stelleti, Cristiano Gozzi

Abici is a defunct Italian bicycle manufacturer founded by Giuseppe Marcheselli, Stefano Stelleti and Cristiano Gozzi in 2006. The company produces classic style bikes, handmade and tested in Italy. Abici has showrooms in Milan and Viadana.

== History ==
The founders formed the prototype for Abici bicycles in Lombardy using the 1950s catalog of an Italian craftsman. Their goal was a classic bicycle with high-tech details and a vintage aesthetic.

The name Abici derives from "bici", the Italian slang for "bicicletta". The name also refers to the first three letters of the Italian alphabet: A-B-C.

== Design ==
Abici bikes are made in eight colors based on car colors of the 1950s, has a Brooks England saddle with copper rivets, metal mudguards and a chrome brake rod. The light-weight bikes are made from aluminum, carbon fiber and titanium.

The company produces classic style bikes, including touring bikes for men and women, as well as racing and mountain bikes. Each bicycle is handmade and tested in Italy. They come in five models: Granturismo, Camporella, Sveltina, Amante and Fuga.

== Collaborations ==
In 2009, Abici and Italian fashion house Fendi created the Fendi Abici Amante Donna Bicycle, featuring Fendi's Selleria leather accessories and fur saddlebags.

== See also ==
- List of bicycle parts
- List of Italian companies
