= Jefferson Alveiro Cepeda =

Ecuadorian bicycle racer

- Cepeda in 2026

Personal information
- Full name: Jefferson Alveiro Cepeda Hernández
- Born: 2 March 1996 (age 30) Quito, Ecuador
- Height: 1.70 m (5 ft 7 in)
- Weight: 61 kg (134 lb)

Cycling career
- Sport: Cycling
- Current team: Movistar Team
- Discipline: Road
- Role: Rider

Amateur team
- 2018–2019: Caja Rural–Seguros RGA amateur

Professional teams
- 2015–2016: Team Ecuador
- 2017: Equipo Bolivia
- 2017–2018: Team Ecuador
- 2019–2024: Caja Rural–Seguros RGA
- 2025–: Movistar Team

Major wins
- Stage races Tour of Qinghai Lake (2024) One-day races and classics National Road Race Championships (2018) National Time Trial Championships (2018, 2025)
Medal record
Men's road bicycle racing
Representing Ecuador
Pan American Championships
Gold medal – first place	2019 Ixmiquilpan	Road race

Jefferson Alveiro Cepeda Hernández (born 2 March 1996) is an Ecuadorian cyclist, who currently rides for UCI WorldTeam Movistar Team. In October 2020, he was named in the startlist for the 2020 Vuelta a España, and he has competed in two more editions since.

He qualified to represent Ecuador at the 2020 Summer Olympics but did not compete.

== Major results ==
2016
1st Stage 5 Volta Ciclística Internacional do Rio Grande do Sul
7th Overall Vuelta a Guatemala

1st Mountains classification

2017
1st Road race, National Under-23 Road Championships
Vuelta a Guatemala

1st Mountains classification
1st Stage 5

1st Mountains classification, Cascade Cycling Classic
2nd Time trial, National Road Championships
2018 (3 pro wins)
1st Road race, South American Games
National Road Championships

1st Road race
1st Time trial

3rd Overall Vuelta a Cantabria
2019 (1)
1st Road race, Pan American Road Championships
1st Vuelta a Navarra
2020
4th Prueba Villafranca de Ordizia
6th Overall Vuelta a Murcia
2022
3rd Road race, Bolivarian Games
8th Overall Tour of Romania
2023
National Road Championships

2nd Time trial
2nd Road race

2024 (2)
1st Overall Tour of Qinghai Lake
National Road Championships

2nd Road race
3rd Time trial

4th Overall O Gran Camiño
5th Overall Tour du Limousin

1st Stage 3

5th Brabantse Pijl
6th Overall Vuelta a Burgos
6th Classic Grand Besançon Doubs
8th Tour du Jura
2025 (1)
1st Time trial, National Road Championships
7th Overall Volta a la Comunitat Valenciana
7th Overall O Gran Camiño
2026
7th Overall Tour de Romandie
8th Ardèche Classic

=== Grand Tour general classification results timeline ===
Grand Tour	2020	2021	2022	2023
Giro d'Italia	—	—	—	—
Tour de France	—	—	—	—
Vuelta a España	116	32	—	DNF

Legend
—	Did not compete
DNF	Did not finish
