= Ecuadorian National Road Championships =

National road cycling championships in Ecuador

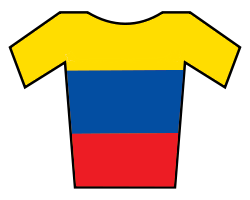

Race details
- Date: June
- Discipline: Road
- Type: One-day race

The Ecuadorian National Road Championships are held annually to decide the cycling champions in both the road race and time trial discipline, across various categories.

== Men ==
=== Road race ===
Year	Winner	Second	Third
2007	Byron Guamá	Jorge Gallegos	José Ragonessi
2008	Carlos Quishpe	Fausto Valencia	Jamil Intriago
2010	José Ragonessi	Luis Calispa	Jose Ruiz Chavez
2011	Wilson Paneluisa	José Ragonessi	Jose Ruiz Chavez
2014	Byron Guamá	Segundo Navarrete	Jorge Luis Montenegro
2015	José Ragonessi	Joel Burbano	Jonathan Caicedo
2017	Jhonatan Narváez	Jorge Luis Montenegro	Byron Guamá
2018	Jefferson Alveiro Cepeda	Jhonatan Narváez	Jorge Luis Montenegro
2019	Jonathan Caicedo	Jefferson Alveiro Cepeda	Henry Velasco
2021	Jefferson Alexander Cepeda	Byron Guamá	Segundo Navarrete
2022	Richard Huera	Richard Carapaz	Jonathan Caicedo
2023	Richard Carapaz	Jefferson Alveiro Cepeda	Jefferson Alexander Cepeda
2024	Jhonatan Narváez	Richard Carapaz	Jefferson Alveiro Cepeda
2025	Jhonatan Narváez	Jefferson Alexander Cepeda	Mateo Ramírez

=== Time trial ===
Year	Winner	Second	Third
2007	Segundo Navarrete	Juan Carlos Montenegro	Héctor Chiles
2009	Segundo Navarrete	José Ragonessi	Luis Villareal
2010	Segundo Navarrete	José Ragonessi	Diego Espinoza
2011	José Ragonessi	Segundo Navarrete	Cristian Garcia
2014	José Ragonessi	Byron Guamá	Segundo Navarrete
2015	Jonathan Caicedo	Segundo Navarrete	Jhonny Caicedo
2016	Segundo Navarrete	Jonathan Caicedo	Cleber Quasquer
2017	Jorge Luis Montenegro	Jefferson Alveiro Cepeda	Cleber Quasquer
2018	Jefferson Alveiro Cepeda	Jorge Luis Montenegro	Héctor Chiles
2019	Jonathan Caicedo	Segundo Navarrete	Jefferson Alveiro Cepeda
2021	Jorge Luis Montenegro	Segundo Navarrete	Leonidas Novoa
2022	Richard Carapaz	Jorge Luis Montenegro	Alexis Quinteros
2023	Jonathan Caicedo	Jefferson Alveiro Cepeda	Jefferson Alexander Cepeda
2024	Richard Carapaz	Jefferson Alveiro Cepeda	Jonathan Caicedo
2025	Jefferson Alveiro Cepeda	Alexis Quinteros	Kevin Navas

== Women ==
Year	Road Race	Time Trial
2011	Nataly Alejandra Arevalo	Maria Eugenia Parra
2014		Jazmin Analia Taborda
2015	Miryam Núñez	Miryam Núñez
2016		Ana Gabriela Suarez
2017		Samia Flores
2018	Samia Flores	Nikole Pamela Narvaez
2019	Miryam Núñez	Miryam Núñez
2021	Miryam Núñez	Miryam Núñez
2022	Esther Galarza	Paula Jara
2023	Ana Vivar	Miryam Núñez
2024	Natalia Amaya	Miryam Núñez
2025	Natalia Amaya	Miryam Núñez
