= Carlos Quishpe =

Ecuadorian cyclist (born 1991)

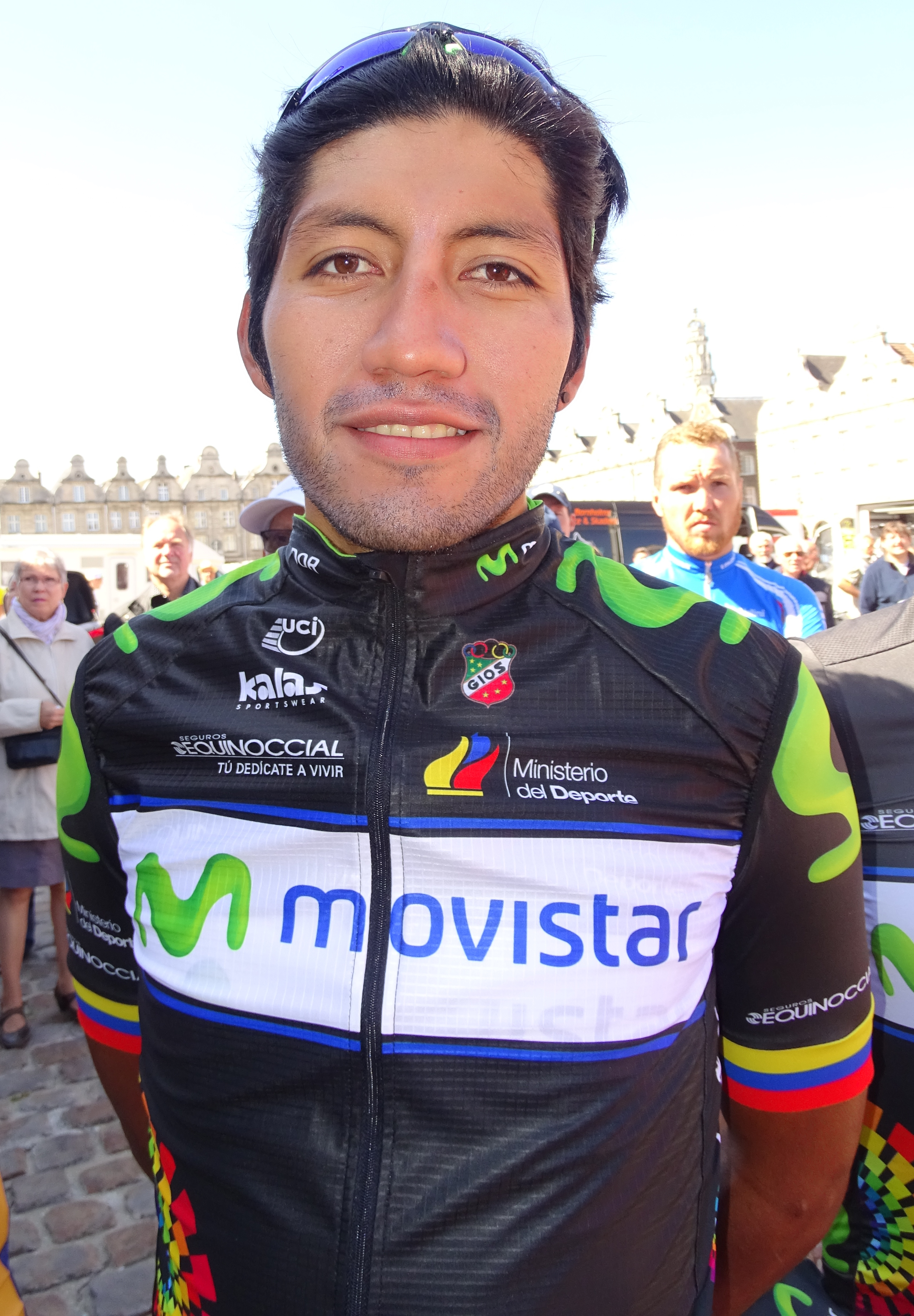

Personal information
- Full name: Carlos Eduardo Quishpe
- Born: July 21, 1991 (age 35) Ecuador

Cycling career
- Sport: Cycling
- Current team: Team Ecuador
- Discipline: Road
- Role: Rider

Professional team
- 2014-: Team Ecuador
Medal record
Men's track cycling
Representing Ecuador
Pan American Championships
Silver medal – second place	2018 Aguascalientes	Omnium

Carlos Eduardo Quishpe (born July 21, 1991) is an Ecuadorian cyclist riding for Team Ecuador. He was named in the startlist for the 2015 World Time Trial Championships.
