= Sucumbíos Canton =

- Canton
- Location of Sucumbíos Province in Ecuador.

- Sucumbíos Canton in Sucumbíos Province
- Coordinates: 0.4592°N 77.5230°W
- Country: Ecuador
- Province: Sucumbíos Province
- Time zone: UTC-5 (ECT)

Sucumbíos Canton is a canton of Ecuador, located in the Sucumbíos Province. Its capital is the town of La Bonita. Its population at the 2001 census was 2,836.
