= Vuelta al Ecuador =

Race details
- Date: November
- Region: Ecuador
- Discipline: Road race
- Competition: UCI America Tour
- Type: Stage race

History
- First edition: 1966
- Editions: 41 (as of 2024)
- First winner: Hipólito Pozo (ECU)
- Most wins: Pedro Rodríguez (ECU) (5 wins)
- Most recent: Richard Huera (ECU)

The Vuelta al Ecuador is a cycling race held annually in Ecuador. It was part of the UCI America Tour in category 2.2 from 2007 to 2010.

== Winners ==
Year	Winner
1966	(Ecuador) Hipólito Pozo
1967	(Ecuador) Jaime Pozo
1971	(Ecuador) Jaime Pozo
1972	(Ecuador) Jaime Pozo
1974	(Colombia) Carlos Arturo Zapata
1975	(Ecuador) Carlos Montenegro
1976	(Ecuador) Carlos Montenegro
1977	(Brazil) Elvio Barreto
1982	(Colombia) Jorge Amable Vázquez
1986	(Ecuador) Juan Carlos Rosero
1987	(Ecuador) Pablo Caicedo
1988	(Ecuador) Pedro Rodríguez
1989	(Ecuador) Juan Carlos Rosero
1990	(Ecuador) Pedro Rodríguez
1991	(Ecuador) Pedro Rodríguez
1992	(Ecuador) Juan Carlos Rosero
1993	(Ecuador) Pedro Rodríguez
1995	(Ecuador) Pedro Rodríguez
1997	(Ecuador) Héctor Chiles
2000	(Colombia) Julio Bernal
2001	(Ecuador) Héctor Chiles
2002	(Ecuador) Héctor Chiles
2003	(Ecuador) Franco Rodríguez
2004	(Ecuador) Byron Guamá
2005	(Ecuador) Héctor Chiles
2006	(Ecuador) Milton Tapia
2007	(Colombia) Alex Atapuma
2008	(Ecuador) Byron Guamá
2009	(Colombia) Fernando Camargo
2010	(Ecuador) Byron Guamá
2011	No race
2012	(Ecuador) Byron Guamá
2013	(Colombia) Freddy Montaña
2014	(Ecuador) Juan Carlos Pozo
2015 2016 2017	No race
2018	(Spain) Óscar Sevilla
2019	(Ecuador) Jorge Luis Montenegro
2020	(Ecuador) Santiago Montenegro
2021	(Ecuador) Wilson Haro
2022	(Colombia) Robinson Chalapud
2023	(Colombia) Robinson Chalapud
2024	(Ecuador) Richard Huera
