= Movistar Ecuador =

Ecuadorian cycling team

Movistar Team Ecuador
Team information
- Registered: Ecuador
- Founded: 2013
- Disbanded: 2021
- Discipline: Road
- Bicycles: Gios
- Website: Team home page

Key personnel
- General manager: Melcior Mauri
- Team manager: Santiago Rosero

Team name history
- 2013 2014–2018 2019–2021: Team RPM Ecuador; Team Ecuador; Movistar Team Ecuador

Movistar Team Ecuador was an Ecuadorian cycling team established in 2013 as a UCI Continental level team. Its last season was in 2021 when the team was merged with Movistar–Best PC.

== Team roster 2019 ==
Rider	Date of birth
Wolfgang Brandl (GER)	12 March 1986 (age 40)
Jefferson Cepeda (ECU)	16 June 1998 (age 28)
Jefferson Cepeda Hernandez (ECU)	2 March 1996 (age 30)
Joel Fuertes (ECU)	11 June 1999 (age 27)
Byron Guamá (ECU)	14 June 1985 (age 41)
Wilson Haro (ECU)	5 January 1998 (age 28)
Pablo Hidalgo (ECU)	16 July 1987 (age 39)

Rider	Date of birth
Richard Huera (ECU)	25 April 1999 (age 27)
Santiago Montenegro (ECU)	15 May 1998 (age 28)
Anderson Timoteo Paredes (VEN)	20 March 1995 (age 31)
Marco Pita (ECU)	9 July 1993 (age 33)
Alexis Quinteros (ECU)	1 October 1997 (age 28)
José Ragonessi (ECU)	11 December 1984 (age 41)

== Major wins ==
2014
Ecuador Road Race Championships, Byron Guamá
Ecuador Time Trial Championships, José Ragonessi
Stage 1 Volta ao Alentejo, Byron Guamá
Pan American Road Race Championships, Byron Guamá
Stages 2 & 3 Tour des Pays de Savoie, Jordi Simón
2015
Overall GP Internacional do Guadiana, Jordi Simón

Stage 1, Jordi Simón

Overall Volta Ciclística Internacional do Rio Grande do Sul, Byron Guamá

Stages 3 & 4, Byron Guamá

Stage 5 Vuelta Mexico Telmex, Byron Guamá
Pan American Road Race Championships, Byron Guamá
Stage 5 Vuelta a Venezuela, Byron Guamá
Ecuador Road Race Championships, José Ragonessi
2016
Stage 3 Volta Ciclística Internacional do Rio Grande do Sul, Byron Guamá
Stage 5 Volta Ciclística Internacional do Rio Grande do Sul, Jefferson Cepeda
Stage 8 Vuelta a Venezuela, Byron Guamá
2018
Stage 9 Vuelta a Venezuela, Byron Guamá
2019
Ecuador U23 Time Trial Championships, Lenin Javier Montenegro
