= Pan American Cycling Championships =

Annual road cycling championships

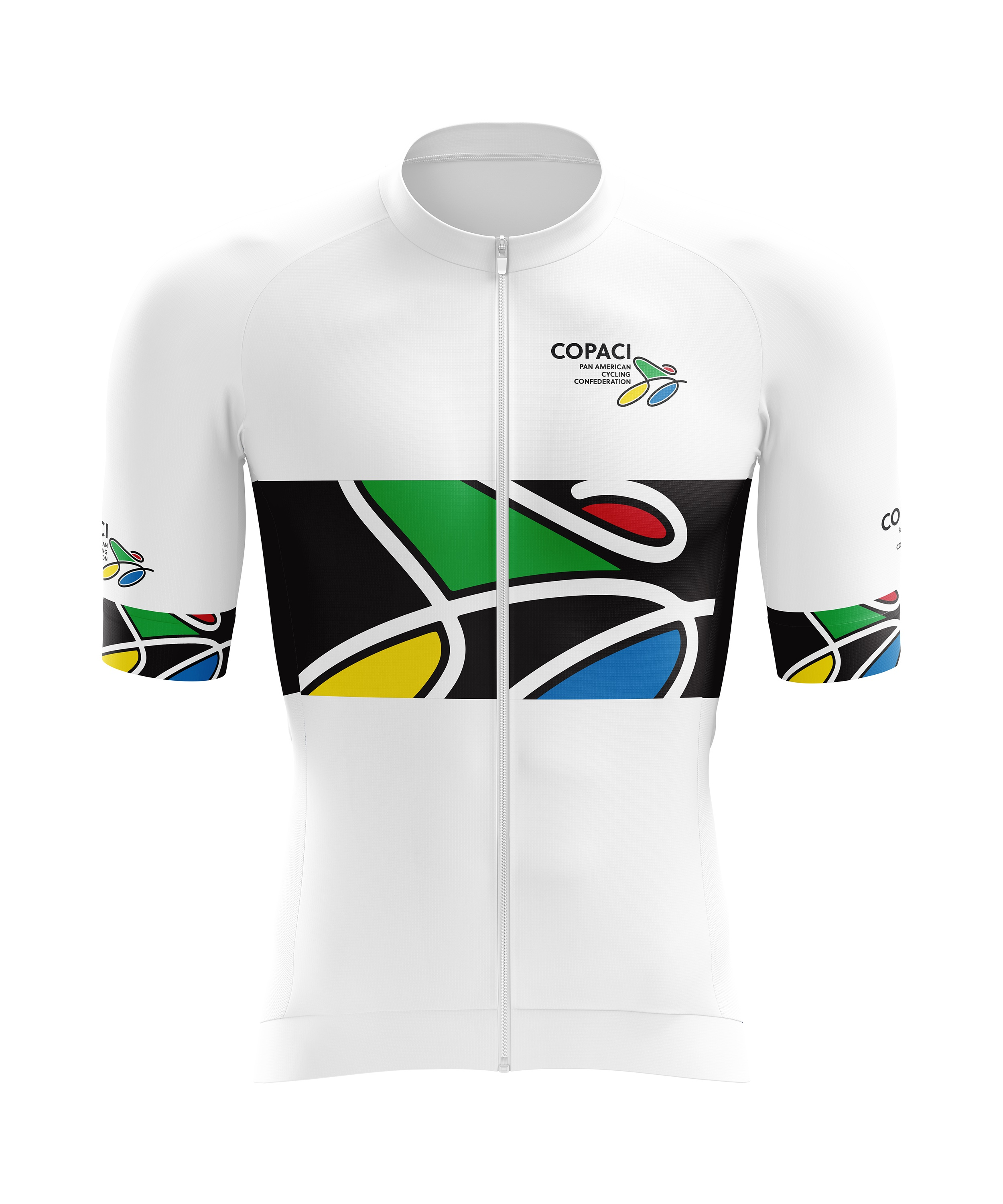
- Pan American Cycling Champion's jersey

The Pan American Cycling Championships are the continental cycling championships for road bicycle racing held annually for member nations of the Pan American Cycling Confederation. The events were first held in 1974 in Cali, Colombia for the road and track disciplines.

The events consist of the:

- Pan American Road Championships
- Pan American Track Championships
- Pan American Cyclo-cross Championships
- Pan American Mountain bike Championships
