= 1995 Clásico RCN =

Race details
- Dates: March 11 – March 20
- Stages: 9
- Distance: 1,421.3 km (883.2 mi)
- Winning time: 36h 41' 54"

Results
	Winner	Raúl Montaña (COL)	(ZG Mobili-Glacial)
	Second	Henry Cárdenas (COL)	(Gaseosas Glacial)
	Third	Pedro Rodríguez (ECU)	(Pony Malta)
	Points	Libardo Niño (COL)	(Pony Malta-Avianca)
	Mountains	José Martín Farfán (COL)	(Pony Malta-Avianca)

The 35th edition of the Clásico RCN was held from March 11 to March 20, 1995, in Colombia. The stage race, with an UCI rate of 2.4, started in Medellín, and finished in Bogotá. RCN stands for "Radio Cadena Nacional" one of the oldest and largest radio networks in the nation.

== Stages ==
=== 1995-03-11: Medellín — Cerro Nutibara (5.8 km) ===
Place	Prologue		General Classification	
Place	Name	Time	Name	Time
1.	Dubán Ramírez (COL)	00:08.13	Dubán Ramírez (COL)	00:08.13

=== 1995-03-12: Caldas — Pereira (234 km) ===
Place	Stage 1		General Classification	
Place	Name	Time	Name	Time
1.	Efraím Rico (COL)	06:37.34		

=== 1995-03-13: Pereira — Cali (201.4 km) ===
Place	Stage 2		General Classification	
Place	Name	Time	Name	Time
1.	Luis Alfredo López (COL)	04:32.08		

=== 1995-03-14: Cali — Armenia (185.6 km) ===
Place	Stage 3		General Classification	
Place	Name	Time	Name	Time
1.	Raúl Montaña (COL)	04:57.20		

=== 1995-03-15: Armenia — Espinal (166.5 km) ===
Place	Stage 4		General Classification	
Place	Name	Time	Name	Time
1.	Henry Cárdenas (COL)	04:24.38		

=== 1995-03-16: Espinal — Mosquera (137 km) ===
Place	Stage 5		General Classification	
Place	Name	Time	Name	Time
1.	Chepe González (COL)	04:04.57		

=== 1995-03-17: Tocancipá — Sogamoso (175 km) ===
Place	Stage 6		General Classification	
Place	Name	Time	Name	Time
1.	Marcel Wüst (GER)	04:03.40		

=== 1995-03-18: Circuito Mundiales Ciclismo Duitama (138 km) ===
Place	Stage 7		General Classification	
Place	Name	Time	Name	Time
1.	Libardo Niño (COL)	03:32.34		

=== 1995-03-19: Paipa — Tunja (42 km) ===
Place	Stage 8 (Individual Time Trial)		General Classification	
Place	Name	Time	Name	Time
1.	Dubán Ramírez (COL)	01:01.41		

=== 1995-03-20: Circuito Parque Nacional (136 km) ===
Place	Stage 9		General Classification	
Place	Name	Time	Name	Time
1.	Ruber Marín (COL)	03:15.48		

== Final classification ==
RANK	NAME	TEAM	TIME
1.	Raúl Montaña (COL)	ZG Mobili - Glacial	36:41:54
2.	Henry Cárdenas (COL)	Gaseosas Glacial	+ 0.38
3.	Pedro Rodríguez (ECU)	Pony Malta de Bavaria-Avianca	+ 1.18
4.	Juan Diego Ramírez (COL)	Aguardiente Antioqueño-Lotería Medellín	+ 1.38
5.	Elkin Barrera (COL)	Gaseosas Glacial	+ 1.41
6.	Celio Roncancio (COL)	Gaseosas Glacial	+ 2.06
7.	Elder Herrera (COL)	Ron Medellín-Lotería Medellín	+ 2.54
8.	Óscar Vargas (COL)	Aguardiente Antioqueño-Lotería Medellín	+ 2.54
9.	Efraím Rico (COL)	Manzana Postobón	+ 3.19
10.	Héctor Palacio (COL)	Aguardiente Antioqueño-Lotería Medellín	+ 3.32

== Teams ==
Pony Malta-Kelme PRF

1. (Colombia) Julio César Aguirre
2. (Colombia) Libardo Niño
3. (Colombia) Chepe González
4. (Colombia) José Martín Farfán
5. (Colombia) Federico Muñoz
6. (Colombia) Héctor Castaño
7. (Colombia) Hernán Buenahora
8. (Colombia) Julio Ortegón
9. (Colombia) Ángel Camargo
10. (Colombia) Jair Bernal

Le Groupement (Francia) PRF

11. (France) Luc Leblanc
12. (Scotland) Robert Millar
13. (Germany) Marcel Wüst
14. (France) Stéphane Hennebert
15. (France) Philippe Bouvatier
16. (France) David Dorique
17. (Colombia) Nelson Rodríguez

Manzana Postobón PRF

21. (Colombia) Luis Alberto González
22. (Colombia) Luis Espinosa
23. (Colombia) Efraím Rico
24. (Colombia) Julio César Rangel
25. (Colombia) Edgar Humberto Ruiz
26. (Colombia) Ruber Marín
27. (Colombia) Julio Ernesto Bernal
28. (Colombia) Álvaro Lozano
29. (Colombia) José Robles
30. (Ecuador) Juan Carlos Rosero

Aguardiante Antioqueño-Lotería de Medellín

31. (Colombia) Carlos Jaramillo
32. (Colombia) Óscar Vargas
33. (Colombia) Javier "El Milagroso" Zapata
34. (Colombia) Jorge Otálvaro
35. (Colombia) Juan Diego Ramírez
36. (Colombia) Argiro Zapata
37. (Colombia) Jaime Bolívar
38. (Colombia) Leonardo Cardona
39. (Colombia) Héctor Palacio
40. (Colombia) Dubán Ramírez

Gasesosas Glacial

41. (Colombia) Henry Cárdenas
42. (Colombia) Álvaro Sierra
43. (Colombia) Raúl Montaña
44. (Colombia) Celio Roncancio
45. (Colombia) Fabio Rodríguez
46. (Colombia) Elkin Barrera
47. (Colombia) Luciano Bonilla
48. (Colombia) Miguel Ángel Sanabria
49. (Colombia) Rubén Beltrán
50. (Colombia) Israel Ochoa

Lituania - Mixto

51. (Lithuania) Stakenas Kestutis
52. (Lithuania) Arunas Bendaravicius
53. (Lithuania) Stakenas Genininas
54. (Lithuania) Alexsiej Kulikov
55. (Lithuania) Donatas Virbickas
56. (Lithuania) Saulius Ruškys
57. (Colombia) Luis Alfredo López
58. (Colombia) Gildardo Sepúlveda
59. (Colombia) Nélson Pérez
60. (Colombia) Santo Álvarez

Manzana Postobón Aficionado

61. (Colombia) José Luis Vanegas
62. (Colombia) Nélson Rodríguez
63. (Colombia) Giovanny Huertas
64. (Colombia) César Grajales
65. (Colombia) Gregorio Ladino
66. (Colombia) Alexis Rojas
67. (Colombia) José Díaz
68. (Colombia) Freddy Moncada
69. (Colombia) Ubaldo Mesa
70. (Colombia) Juan Robayo
71. (Colombia) Luis Cárdenas

Ron Medellín-Lotería de Medellín

71. (Colombia) Elder Herrera
72. (Colombia) Marco Isaías
73. (Colombia) Hernán Darío Muñoz
74. (Colombia) Otoniel Soto
75. (Colombia) Germán Ospina
76. (Colombia) Ramón Fernando García
77. (Colombia) Luis Eduardo Acevedo
78. (Colombia) Néstor Barrera
79. (Colombia) Francisco Orozco
80. (Colombia) John Freddy Restrepo

Pony Malta–Avianca

91. (Ecuador) Pedro Rodríguez
92. (Colombia) Víctor Hugo Bolívar
93. (Colombia) Ricardo Mesa
94. (Colombia) Eduardo Guerrero
95. (Colombia) Santiago Amador
96. (Colombia) Félix Cárdenas
97. (Colombia) Diego Garavito
98. (Colombia) Omar Trompa
99. (Colombia) Ismael Sarmiento
100. (Colombia) José Ibáñez

Línea Gacela-Gobernación de Boyacá

101. (Colombia) Carlos Julio Rincón
102. (Colombia) Luis Enrique Pinzón
103. (Colombia) Javier Niño
104. (Colombia) Iván Aguirre
105. (Colombia) Miguel Ángel Sanabria
106. (Colombia) Fabio Arenas
107. (Colombia) Alfonso Alayón
108. (Colombia) José Florencio Franco
109. (Colombia) Augusto Bohórquez
110. (Colombia) Jairo Camargo

Cicloases-Cundinamarca

111. (Colombia) Jaime Acosta Cruz
112. (Colombia) Juan Carlos Fonseca
113. (Colombia) Carlos Vergara
114. (Colombia) Víctor Hugo García
115. (Colombia) Carlos Balaguera
116. (Colombia) Agustín Rodriguez
117. (Colombia) Marco Antonio Gómez
118. (Colombia) Ricardo Sánchez Arévalo
119. (Colombia) Henry Castro
120. (Colombia) Jorge Enrique Piñeda

Provincia Cundinamarca

121. (Colombia) Luis Enrique Vargas
122. (Colombia) Carlos Saavedra
123. (Colombia) Leonardo Bermúdez
124. (Colombia) Hildebrando Rodríguez
125. (Colombia) Celso González
126. (Colombia) Oscar Múnera
127. (Colombia) Segundo Chaparro
128. (Austria) Josef Lontscharitsch
129. (Colombia) Armando Ospina

Mixto

131. (Colombia) Luis Alfredo López
132. (Colombia) Gildardo Sepúlveda
133. (Colombia) Nélson Pérez
134. (Colombia) Santo Álvarez

== See also ==
- 1995 Vuelta a Colombia
