= 1995 Vuelta a Colombia =

Race details
- Dates: April 18 – May 1, 1995
- Stages: 13
- Distance: 1,927 km (1,197 mi)
- Winning time: 53h 28' 25"

Results
Jersey awarded to the overall winner	Winner	Chepe González (COL)	(Pony Malta-Kelme)
	Second	Juan Diego Ramírez (COL)	(Aguardiente)
	Third	Álvaro Sierra (COL)	(Gaseosas Glacial)
	Points	Elder Herrera (COL)	(Ron Medellín-Lotín)
	Mountains	Miguel Ángel Sanabria (COL)	(Gaseosas Glacial)
	Young rider	Gregorio Ladino (COL)	(Postobón Aficionado)
	Combination	Juan Diego Ramírez (COL)	(Aguardiente)
	Team	(Colombia) Aguardiente	

The 45th edition of the Vuelta a Colombia, a bicycle stage race was held from April 18 to May 1, 1995. There were a total number of 111 competitors.

== Stages ==
=== 1995-04-18: Paipa — Paipa (6.2 km) ===
Place	Prologue		General Classification	
Place	Name	Time	Name	Time
1.	Pedro Rodríguez (ECU)	07.27	Pedro Rodríguez (ECU)	07.27
2.	Elder Herrera (COL)	+0.07	Elder Herrera (COL)	+0.07
3.	Germán Ospina (COL)	+0.08	Germán Ospina (COL)	+0.08

=== 1995-04-19: Duitama — Villa de Leiva (177.3 km) ===
Place	Stage 1		General Classification	
Place	Name	Time	Name	Time
1.	Ruber Marín (COL)	04:07.03		
2.	Héctor Palacio (COL)	—		
3.	Óscar Alveiro (COL)	—		

=== 1995-04-20: Villa de Leiva — Pacho (198.1 km) ===
Place	Stage 2		General Classification	
Place	Name	Time	Name	Time
1.	Chepe González (COL)	05:19.05		
2.	Juan Diego Ramírez (COL)	+0.02		
3.	Libardo Niño (COL)	+0.03		

=== 1995-04-21: Funza — Mariquita (157.1 km) ===
Place	Stage 3		General Classification	
Place	Name	Time	Name	Time
1.	Luis Cárdenas (COL)	03:45.16		
2.	Edward Ruiz (COL)	—		
3.	Libardo Niño (COL)	+0.52		

=== 1995-04-22: Honda — Manizales (143.7 km) ===
Place	Stage 4		General Classification	
Place	Name	Time	Name	Time
1.	Libardo Niño (COL)	04:38.18		
2.	Chepe González (COL)	+1.02		
3.	Álvaro Sierra (COL)	+1.11		

=== 1995-04-23: Manizales — Santa Helena del Opón (214.2 km) ===
Place	Stage 5		General Classification	
Place	Name	Time	Name	Time
1.	Pedro Rodríguez (ECU)	05:54.06	Libardo Niño (COL)	23:52.33
2.	Héctor Palacio (COL)	—	Chepe González (COL)	+0.51
3.	Chepe González (COL)	—	Juan Diego Ramírez (COL)	+1.38

=== 1995-04-23: Caldas — Palestina (172.3 km) ===
Place	Stage 6		General Classification	
Place	Name	Time	Name	Time
1.	Miguel Ángel Sanabria (COL)	04:09.12	Libardo Niño (COL)	
2.	Juan Diego Ramírez (COL)	+0.06		
3.	Chepe González (COL)	+0.09		

=== 1995-04-25: Pereira — Cali (206.5 km) ===
Place	Stage 7		General Classification	
Place	Name	Time	Name	Time
1.	Leonardo Cardona (COL)	04:28.26	Libardo Niño (COL)	33:01.25
2.	Óscar Giraldo (COL)	—	Chepe González (COL)	+0.47
3.	Jairo Hernández (COL)	—	Juan Diego Ramírez (COL)	+1.28

=== 1995-04-26: Cali — Buenaventura (127.8 km) ===
Place	Stage 8		General Classification	
Place	Name	Time	Name	Time
1.	Luis Alberto González (COL)	02:55.45	Libardo Niño (COL)	35:57.10
2.	Jorge Otálvaro (COL)	—	Chepe González (COL)	+0.47
3.	Miguel Ángel Sanabria (COL)	—	Juan Diego Ramírez (COL)	+1.28

=== 1995-04-27: Buenaventura — Buga (122.3 km) ===
Place	Stage 9		General Classification	
Place	Name	Time	Name	Time
1.	Héctor Palacio (COL)	03:15.38		
2.	Efraím Rico (COL)	—		
3.	Alexis Rojas (COL)	—		

=== 1995-04-28: Buga — Armenia (187.6 km) ===
Place	Stage 10		General Classification	
Place	Name	Time	Name	Time
1.	Carlos Humberto Cabrera (COL)	04:42.28	Chepe González (COL)	44:01.14
2.	Francisco Orozco (COL)	+0.28	Juan Diego Ramírez (COL)	+0.41
3.	Alfonso Alayón (COL)	+4.50	Libardo Niño (COL)	+1.29

=== 1995-04-29: Armenia — Ibagué (115.2 km) ===
Place	Stage 11		General Classification	
Place	Name	Time	Name	Time
1.	Chepe González (COL)	03:16.29	Chepe González (COL)	47:17.43
2.	Juan Diego Ramírez (COL)	+0.13	Juan Diego Ramírez (COL)	+0.54
3.	Álvaro Sierra (COL)	+0.19	Álvaro Sierra (COL)	+2.48

=== 1995-04-30: Ibagué — Santa Fé de Bogotá (213.7 km) ===
Place	Stage 12		General Classification	
Place	Name	Time	Name	Time
1.	Dubán Ramírez (COL)	05:27.41	Chepe González (COL)	52:47.29
2.	Alexis Rojas (COL)	—	Juan Diego Ramírez (COL)	+0.54
3.	José Ángel Robles (COL)	—	Álvaro Sierra (COL)	+2.48

=== 1995-05-01: Bogotá — Alto de Patios (26 km) ===
Place	Stage 13 (Individual Time Trial)		General Classification	
Place	Name	Time	Name	Time
1.	Juan Diego Ramírez (COL)	0:40.11	Chepe González (COL)	53:28.25
2.	Luis Alberto González (COL)	+0.23	Juan Diego Ramírez (COL)	+0.09
3.	Chepe González (COL)	+0.45	Álvaro Sierra (COL)	+3.41

== Final classification ==
RANK	NAME	TEAM	TIME
1.	Chepe González (COL)	Pony Malta-Kelme	53:28:25
2.	Juan Diego Ramírez (COL)	Aguardiente Antioqueño	+ 0.09
3.	Álvaro Sierra (COL)	Gaseosas Glacial	+ 3.41
4.	Elkin Barrera (COL)	Gaseosas Glacial	+ 5.21
5.	Libardo Niño (COL)	Pony Malta-Kelme	+ 6.05
6.	Héctor Palacio (COL)	Aguardiente Antioqueño	+ 6.39
7.	Carlos Jaramillo (COL)	Aguardiente Antioqueño	+ 7.55
8.	Luis Alberto González (COL)	Manzana Postobón	+ 8.19
9.	Elder Herrera (COL)	Ron Medellín-Lotín	+ 11.18
10.	Fabio Rodríguez (COL)	Gaseosas Glacial	+ 12.00

== Teams ==
Pony Malta-Kelme PRF

1. (Colombia) Chepe González
2. (Colombia) Julio César Aguirre
3. (Colombia) José Martín Farfán
4. (Colombia) Libardo Niño
5. (Colombia) Héctor Castaño
6. (Colombia) Carlos Alberto Contreras
7. (Colombia) José Castelblanco
8. (Colombia) Nélson Ramírez
9. (Colombia) Óscar Jurado
10. (Colombia) Olmedo Capacho

Manzana Postobón PRF

11. (Colombia) Luis Alberto González
12. (Colombia) Luis Espinosa
13. (Colombia) Efraím Rico
14. (Ecuador) Juan Carlos Rosero
15. (Colombia) Edgar Humberto Ruiz
16. (Colombia) Álvaro Lozano
17. (Colombia) Ruber Marín
18. (Colombia) José Robles
19. (Colombia) Julio César Rangel
20. (Colombia) Julio Ernesto Bernal

Gasesosas Glacial

21. (Colombia) Henry Cárdenas
22. (Colombia) Celio Roncancio
23. (Colombia) Fabio Rodríguez
24. (Colombia) Álvaro Sierra
25. (Colombia) Israel Ochoa
26. (Colombia) Miguel Ángel Sanabria
27. (Colombia) Luciano Bonilla
28. (Colombia) Jairo Obando
29. (Colombia) Armando Moreno
30. (Colombia) Elkin Barrera

Aguardiante Antioqueño-Lotería de Medellín

31. (Colombia) Carlos Jaramillo
32. (Colombia) Óscar Vargas
33. (Colombia) Héctor Palacio
34. (Colombia) Argiro Zapata
35. (Colombia) Javier "El Milagroso" Zapata
36. (Colombia) Dubán Ramírez
37. (Colombia) Leonardo Cardona
38. (Colombia) Jorge Otálvaro
39. (Colombia) Juan Diego Ramírez
40. (Colombia) Jaime Bolívar

Pony Malta–Avianca

41. (Ecuador) Pedro Rodríguez
42. (Colombia) Víctor Hugo Bolívar
43. (Colombia) Diego Garavito
44. (Colombia) Eduardo Guerrero
45. (Colombia) José Daniel Bernal
46. (Colombia) Santiago Amador
47. (Colombia) Jairo Hernández
48. (Colombia) Ismael Sarmiento
49. (Colombia) Omar Trompa
50. (Colombia) José Ibáñez

Pilsener (Ecuador)

51. (Ecuador) Franco Rodríguez
52. (Ecuador) Byrón Chulde
53. (Ecuador) Raúl Huera
54. (Colombia) Carlos Alberto Saavedra
55. (Ecuador) Marco Pita
56. (Kazakhstan) Daulet Sapazhanov
57. (Ecuador) Pablo Perugachi
58. (Colombia) Walter Barco
59. (Ecuador) Héctor Chiles

Manzana Postobón Aficionado

61. (Colombia) José Luis Vanegas
62. (Colombia) Nélson Rodríguez
63. (Colombia) Óscar Alveiro
64. (Colombia) César Grajales
65. (Colombia) Gregorio Ladino
66. (Colombia) Luis Cárdenas
67. (Colombia) Alexis Rojas
68. (Colombia) Juan Alberto Robayo
69. (Colombia) Ubaldo Mesa
70. (Colombia) Juan Carlos Vargas

Cuba National Team

71. (Cuba) Eneido Soler
72. (Cuba) Eliécer Valdez
73. (Cuba) Frank Consuegra
74. (Cuba) Iddis Albin Tabares
75. (Cuba) Nivardo Enriquez
76. (Cuba) Libardo Rodríguez

Agua Natural Glacial

81. (Colombia) Víctor Becerra
82. (Colombia) Henry Pérez
83. (Colombia) Humberto Estupiñán
84. (Colombia) Jairo Pérez
85. (Colombia) Víctor Niño
86. (Colombia) Orlando Ortegón
87. (Colombia) Raúl Gómez
88. (Colombia) Urbelino Mesa
89. (Colombia) Edward Ruiz
90. (Colombia) Carlos Cabrera

Ron Medellín-Lotin

91. (Colombia) Francisco Orozco
92. (Colombia) Elder Herrera
93. (Colombia) Germán Ospina
94. (Colombia) John Freddy Restrepo
95. (Colombia) Hernán Osorio
96. (Colombia) Otoniel Soto
97. (Colombia) Ramón Fernando García
98. (Colombia) Marco Isaías
99. (Colombia) Luis Eduardo Acevedo
100. (Colombia) Néstor Barrera

Todos por Boyacá

101. (Colombia) Luis López
102. (Colombia) José Florencio Franco
103. (Colombia) Luis Enrique Pinzón
104. (Colombia) Augusto Bohórquez
105. (Colombia) Miguel Ángel Sanabria
106. (Colombia) Jairo Camargo
107. (Colombia) Javier Niño
108. (Colombia) Iván Aguirre
109. (Colombia) Fabio Arenas
110. (Colombia) Alfonso Alayón

Cicloases-Cundinamarca

111. (Colombia) José Reinaldo Castañeda
112. (Colombia) Wilson Farías
113. (Colombia) Jorge Enrique Pineda
114. (Colombia) Javier Castiblanco
115. (Colombia) Armando Ospina
116. (Colombia) Luis Fernando Bonilla

== See also ==
- 1995 Clásico RCN
