= 1997 Vuelta a Colombia =

Race details
- Dates: April 21 – May 4, 1997
- Stages: 13
- Distance: 1,960 km (1,218 mi)
- Winning time: 50h 14' 34"

Results
Jersey awarded to the overall winner	Winner	José Castelblanco (COL)	(Kelme-Telecom)
	Second	Jair Bernal (COL)	(Todos por Boyacá)
	Third	Héctor Palacio (COL)	(Kelme-Telecom)
	Points	Héctor Palacio (COL)	(Kelme-Telecom)
	Mountains	Juan Diego Ramírez (COL)	(Kelme-Telecom)
	Combination	Raúl Montaña (COL)	(Caprecom-Zapatos)
	Team	(Colombia) Kelme-Telecom	

The 47th edition of the Vuelta a Colombia was held from April 21 to May 4, 1997. There were a total of 119 competitors, including six Mexican riders.

== Stages ==
=== 1997-04-21: Bucaramanga — Bucaramanga (7.6 km) ===
Place	Prologue		General Classification	
Place	Name	Time	Name	Time
1.	José Castelblanco (COL)	00:14.28	José Castelblanco (COL)	00:14.28
2.	Federico Muñoz (COL)	+0.14	Federico Muñoz (COL)	+0.14
3.	Elder Herrera (COL)	+0.23	Elder Herrera (COL)	+0.23

=== 1997-04-22: Bucaramanga — Barichara (148.7 km) ===
Place	Stage 1		General Classification	
Place	Name	Time	Name	Time
1.	Héctor Palacio (COL)	03:49.18	José Castelblanco (COL)	04:03.50
2.	Ángel Camargo (COL)	—	Federico Muñoz (COL)	+0.06
3.	Federico Muñoz (COL)	—	Elder Herrera (COL)	+0.23

=== 1997-04-23: Oiba — Duitama (192.7 km) ===
Place	Stage 2		General Classification	
Place	Name	Time	Name	Time
1.	Israel Ochoa (COL)	05:00.30	Santiago Botero (COL)	09:04.55
2.	Santiago Botero (COL)	+0.01	José Castelblanco (COL)	+0.13
3.	Elder Herrera (COL)	+0.38	Federico Muñoz (COL)	+0.19

=== 1997-04-24: Tunja — Zipaquirá (138.3 km) ===
Place	Stage 3		General Classification	
Place	Name	Time	Name	Time
1.	Hernán Buenahora (COL)	03:05.12	Hernán Buenahora (COL)	12:10.37
2.	Carlos Contreras (COL)	+1.24	Santiago Botero (COL)	+0.57
3.	Elkin Barrera (COL)	—	José Castelblanco (COL)	+1.10

=== 1997-04-25: Funza — Ibagué (196.2 km) ===
Place	Stage 4		General Classification	
Place	Name	Time	Name	Time
1.	Juan Diego Ramírez (COL)	04:53.19	Hernán Buenahora (COL)	17:04.01
2.	Libardo Niño (COL)	—	Santiago Botero (COL)	+0.57
3.	Julio César Aguirre (COL)	—	José Castelblanco (COL)	+1.10

=== 1997-04-26: Ibagué — Sevilla (185.9 km) ===
Place	Stage 5		General Classification	
Place	Name	Time	Name	Time
1.	Elkin Barrera (COL)	05:15.15	José Castelblanco (COL)	22:20.14
2.	Jair Bernal (COL)	—	Jair Bernal (COL)	+0.22
3.	José Castelblanco (COL)	+0.02	Juan Diego Ramírez (COL)	+2.24

=== 1997-04-27: Cali Circuito Panamericano (105 km) ===
Place	Stage 6		General Classification	
Place	Name	Time	Name	Time
1.	Julio Ernesto Bernal (COL)	02:18.30	José Castelblanco (COL)	24:39.03
2.	Humberto Hernández (COL)	—	Jair Bernal (COL)	+0.22
3.	Raúl Montaña (COL)	+0.09	Elkin Barrera (COL)	+1.25

=== 1997-04-28: Palmira — Pereira (200.4 km) ===
Place	Stage 7		General Classification	
Place	Name	Time	Name	Time
1.	Freddy Moncada (COL)	04:45.12	José Castelblanco (COL)	29:24.30
2.	Jair Bernal (COL)	—	Jair Bernal (COL)	+0.22
3.	Francisco Orozco (COL)	+0.02	Elkin Barrera (COL)	+1.25

=== 1997-04-29: Santa Rosa de Cabal — Manizales (35.7 km) ===
Place	Stage 8 (Individual Time Trial)		General Classification	
Place	Name	Time	Name	Time
1.	José Castelblanco (COL)	00:59.20	José Castelblanco (COL)	30:23.47
2.	Héctor Palacio (COL)	+0.28	Jair Bernal (COL)	+2.01
3.	Carlos Contreras (COL)	—	Héctor Palacio (COL)	+3.05

=== 1997-04-30: Manizales — Itagüí (184 km) ===
Place	Stage 9		General Classification	
Place	Name	Time	Name	Time
1.	Hernán Darío Muñoz (COL)	04:45.32	José Castelblanco (COL)	35:09.27
2.	Héctor Palacio (COL)	+0.08	Jair Bernal (COL)	+1.59
3.	Raúl Montaña (COL)	—	Héctor Palacio (COL)	+2.59

=== 1997-05-01: Medellín — Alto Santa Helena (91.2 km) ===
Place	Stage 10		General Classification	
Place	Name	Time	Name	Time
1.	Julio César Rangel (COL)	02:32.17	José Castelblanco (COL)	37:42.49
2.	Juan Diego Ramírez (COL)	+0.53	Jair Bernal (COL)	+1.59
3.	Héctor Palacio (COL)	+1.03	Héctor Palacio (COL)	+2.52

=== 1997-05-02: Rionegro — Puerto Salgar (197 km) ===
Place	Stage 11		General Classification	
Place	Name	Time	Name	Time
1.	José Daniel Bernal (COL)	05:02.04	José Castelblanco (COL)	???????
2.	Misael Orozco (COL)	—	Jair Bernal (COL)	+1.59
3.	Celio Roncancio (COL)	—	Héctor Palacio (COL)	+2.52

=== 1997-05-03: La Dorada — Fontibón (179.5 km) ===
Place	Stage 12		General Classification	
Place	Name	Time	Name	Time
1.	Gregorio Ladino (COL)	05:23.53	José Castelblanco (COL)	48:11.18
2.	Raúl Montaña (COL)	+0.04	Jair Bernal (COL)	+1.59
3.	Libardo Niño (COL)	—	Héctor Palacio (COL)	+2.52

=== 1997-05-04: Circuito Bogotá (100 km) ===
Place	Stage 13		General Classification	
Place	Name	Time	Name	Time
1.	Leonardo Cardona (COL)	03:03.15	José Castelblanco (COL)	50:14:34
2.	Víctor Hugo Peña (COL)	+0.01	Jair Bernal (COL)	+ 1.59
3.	Federico Muñoz (COL)	+0.01	Héctor Palacio (COL)	+ 2.52

== Jersey progression ==
Stage	Winner	General classification	Points classification	Mountains classification	Team classification
P	José Castelblanco	José Castelblanco	—	—	—
1	Héctor Palacio	José Castelblanco	Héctor Palacio	Julio César Rangel	Telecom-Capitel-Kelme
2	Israel Ochoa	Santiago Botero	Federico Muñoz	Raúl Montaña	Telecom-Capitel-Kelme
3	Hernán Buenahora	Hernán Buenahora	Federico Muñoz	Raúl Montaña	Telecom-Capitel-Kelme
4	Juan Diego Ramírez	Hernán Buenahora	Federico Muñoz	Raúl Montaña	Telecom-Capitel-Kelme
5	Elkin Barrera	José Castelblanco	unknown	unknown	Telecom-Capitel-Kelme
6	Julio Ernesto Bernal	José Castelblanco	unknown	unknown	Telecom-Capitel-Kelme
7	Freddy Moncada	José Castelblanco	unknown	unknown	Telecom-Capitel-Kelme
8	José Castelblanco	José Castelblanco	unknown	unknown	Telecom-Capitel-Kelme
9	Hernán Darío Muñoz	José Castelblanco	unknown	unknown	Telecom-Capitel-Kelme
10	Julio César Rangel	José Castelblanco	unknown	unknown	Telecom-Capitel-Kelme
11	José Daniel Bernal	José Castelblanco	unknown	unknown	Telecom-Capitel-Kelme
12	Gregorio Ladino	José Castelblanco	unknown	unknown	Telecom-Capitel-Kelme
13	Leonardo Cardona	José Castelblanco	Héctor Palacio	Juan Diego Ramírez	Telecom-Capitel-Kelme

== Final classification ==
RANK	NAME	TEAM	TIME
1.	José Castelblanco (COL)	Kelme-Telecom	50:14:34
2.	Jair Bernal (COL)	Todos por Boyacá	+ 1.59
3.	Héctor Palacio (COL)	Kelme-Telecom	+ 2.52
4.	Juan Diego Ramírez (COL)	Kelme-Telecom	+ 3.03
5.	Carlos Alberto Contreras (COL)	Kelme-Telecom	+ 3.17
6.	Raúl Montaña (COL)	Caprecom-Zapatos	+ 5.16
7.	Álvaro Sierra (COL)	Todos por Boyacá	+ 5.23
8.	Julio César Aguirre (COL)	Kelme-Telecom	+ 5.35
9.	Libardo Niño (COL)	Lotería de Medellín-EPM	+ 8.11
10.	Álvaro Lozano (COL)	San Andresitos de la 38	+ 8.21

== Teams ==
Todos por Boyacá — Lotería de Boyacá

1. (Colombia) Miguel Ángel Sanabria
2. (Colombia) Israel Ochoa
3. (Colombia) Álvaro Sierra
4. (Colombia) Jair Bernal
5. (Colombia) José Ibáñez
6. (Colombia) Urbelino Mesa
7. (Colombia) Graciano Fonseca
8. (Colombia) Jairo Pérez
9. (Colombia) Ismael Sarmiento
10. (Colombia) Ubaldo Mesa

Telecom Discado Directo Internacional — Kelme

11. (Colombia) Juan Diego Ramírez
12. (Colombia) Héctor Palacio
13. (Colombia) Julio César Aguirre
14. (Colombia) Carlos Contreras
15. (Colombia) José Castelblanco
16. (Colombia) Federico Muñoz
17. (Colombia) Jairo Hernández
18. (Colombia) Víctor Hugo Peña
19. (Colombia) Elder Herrera
20. (Colombia) Carlos Osorio

Kelme Costa Blanca

21. (Colombia) Hernán Buenahora
22. (Colombia) Chepe González
23. (Colombia) Juan José de los Ángeles
24. (Spain) Francisco Benitez
25. (Spain) Daniel Ribera
26. (Spain) Javier Pascual
27. (Spain) Severo Rodríguez

Aguardiente Antioqueño — Lotería de Medellín

28. (Colombia) Dubán Ramírez
29. (Colombia) Germán Ospina
30. (Colombia) Javier Zapata)
31. (Colombia) Argiro Zapata
32. (Colombia) Hernán Darío Muñoz
33. (Colombia) Ramón García
34. (Colombia) Héctor Castaño
35. (Colombia) Marco Isaías
36. (Colombia) Leonardo Cardona
37. (Colombia) Ariel Martínez

Petróleos de Colombia — Energía Pura

38. (Colombia) Luis Espinosa
39. (Colombia) Álvaro Mejía
40. (Colombia) Raúl Gómez Suárez
41. (Colombia) Juan Javier Castillo
42. (Colombia) José Daniel Bernal
43. (Colombia) Diego Garavito
44. (Colombia) Heberth Gutiérrez
45. (Colombia) Flober Peña

Gaseosas Glacial

46. (Colombia) Libardo Niño
47. (Colombia) Elkin Barrera
48. (Colombia) Víctor Becerra
49. (Colombia) Ángel Camargo
50. (Colombia) Henry Cárdenas
51. (Colombia) Víctor Niño
52. (Colombia) Jairo Torres
53. (Colombia) Armando Moreno
54. (Colombia) Edward Ruiz
55. (Colombia) Giovanny Huertas

Caprecom — Zapatos Kioo’s

56. (Colombia) Raúl Montaña
57. (Colombia) José Vanegas
58. (Colombia) Julio César Rangel
59. (Colombia) Gregorio Ladino
60. (Colombia) Nélson Rodríguez
61. (Colombia) Freddy Moncada
62. (Colombia) Adolfo Rico
63. (Colombia) Luis Arnulfo Silva
64. (Colombia) Humberto Hernández
65. (Colombia) Henry Castro

San Andresitos de la 38 — Cúcuta su Bono

66. (Colombia) Álvaro Lozano
67. (Colombia) Celio Roncancio
68. (Colombia) César Goyeneche
69. (Colombia) Raúl Saavedra
70. (Colombia) Jaime Pinzón
71. (Colombia) José David Suárez
72. (Colombia) Rafael Brand
73. (Colombia) Eduardo Hernández

Ciclistas de Jesucristo

74. (Colombia) Julio Ernesto Bernal
75. (Colombia) Víctor Herrera
76. (Colombia) Luis Samacá
77. (Colombia) José Rodríguez
78. (Colombia) Juan Fonseca
79. (Colombia) Elio Pineda
80. (Colombia) Bernardo Pedraza
81. (Colombia) Guillermo Chaparro

Idea — SAM (Orgullo Paisa)

82. (Colombia) Jorge Otálvaro
83. (Colombia) Hernán Osorio
84. (Colombia) Francisco Orozco
85. (Colombia) Jaime Bolívar
86. (Colombia) Ricardo León
87. (Colombia) Wilmer Álzate

Mixto Telecom — Oriente Antioqueño

88. (Colombia) Efraím Rico
89. (Colombia) Ricardo Mesa
90. (Colombia) Nélson Ramírez
91. (Colombia) Óscar Jurado
92. (Colombia) Santiago Botero
93. (Colombia) Nélson Vargas
94. (Colombia) Otoniel Soto
95. (Colombia) Misael Orozco

Hotel Nuevo Magdalena Cicloases

96. (Colombia) José Castañeda
97. (Colombia) Óscar Múnera
98. (Colombia) Haristón Beltrán
99. (Colombia) Luis Fernando Bonilla
100. (Colombia) Carlos Vargas
101. (Colombia) José Ángel Robles
102. (Colombia) Marceliano Farfán

Mixto Glacial A

103. (Colombia) Víctor Hugo González
104. (Colombia) Miguel Ángel Niño
105. (Colombia) Miller Ñañez
106. (Colombia) Gustavo Taborda
107. (Colombia) Carlos Humberto Cabrera

Gaseosas Glacial — Tenis Karst Musher México Guanajuato

108. (Austria) Josef Lontscharitsch
109. (Mexico) Israel Ávila
110. (Mexico) Noé Hermán Camacho
111. (Mexico) Víctor Hugo Tapia
112. (Mexico) Armando Robles
113. (Mexico) Víctor Rodríguez
114. (Mexico) Alejandro Sánchez

== See also ==
- 1997 Clásico RCN
