= 1994 Vuelta a Colombia =

Race details
- Dates: March 15–27, 1994
- Stages: 12
- Distance: 1,930 km (1,200 mi)
- Winning time: 52h 27' 57"

Results
| Jersey awarded to the overall winner | Winner | Chepe González (COL) | (Manzana Postobón) |
| | Second | Álvaro Sierra (COL) | (Gaseosas Glacial) |
| | Third | Carlos Jaramillo (COL) | (Lotería de Medellín) |
| | Points | Julio Cubides (COL) | (Agua Natural Glacial) |
| | Mountains | Chepe González (COL) | (Manzana Postobón) |
| | Young rider | Juan Javier Castillo (COL) | (Pony Malta-Avianca) |
| | Combination | Chepe González (COL) | (Manzana Postobón) |
| | Team | (Colombia) Gaseosas Glacial | |

The 44th edition of the Vuelta a Colombia was held from March 15 to March 27, 1994. There were a total number of 95 competitors.

== Stages ==
=== 1994-03-15: Ocaña — Ocaña (7.9 km) ===
| Place | Prologue | | General Classification | |
| Place | Name | Time | Name | Time |
|---|---|---|---|---|
| 1. | Julio Ernesto Bernal (COL) | 00:09.52 | Julio Ernesto Bernal (COL) | 00:09.52 |

=== 1994-03-16: Aguachica — Bucaramanga (173.1 km) ===
| Place | Stage 1 | | General Classification | |
| Place | Name | Time | Name | Time |
|---|---|---|---|---|
| 1. | Eduardo Guerrero (COL) | 05:03.49 | | |

=== 1994-03-17: Floridablanca — Socorro (116.5 km) ===
| Place | Stage 2 | | General Classification | |
| Place | Name | Time | Name | Time |
|---|---|---|---|---|
| 1. | Jorge Otálvaro (COL) | 03:11.37 | | |

=== 1994-03-18: Socorro — Tunja (164.4 km) ===
| Place | Stage 3 | | General Classification | |
| Place | Name | Time | Name | Time |
|---|---|---|---|---|
| 1. | Israel Ochoa (COL) | 04:59.31 | | |

=== 1994-03-19: Tunja — La Vega (192.3 km) ===
| Place | Stage 4 | | General Classification | |
| Place | Name | Time | Name | Time |
|---|---|---|---|---|
| 1. | Héctor Palacio (COL) | 04:18.12 | | |

=== 1994-03-20: Honda — Manizales (141.8 km) ===
| Place | Stage 5 | | General Classification | |
| Place | Name | Time | Name | Time |
|---|---|---|---|---|
| 1. | Chepe González (COL) | 04:28.33 | Álvaro Sierra (COL) | 22:16.31 |
| 2. | Álvaro Sierra (COL) | — | Chepe González (COL) | +0.41 |
| 3. | Celio Roncancio (COL) | +0.58 | Celio Roncancio (COL) | +1.09 |

=== 1994-03-21: Manizales — Alto de Santa Helena (213.8 km) ===
| Place | Stage 6 | | General Classification | |
| Place | Name | Time | Name | Time |
|---|---|---|---|---|
| 1. | Chepe González (COL) | 06:15.33 | | |

=== 1994-03-22: Caldas — Pereira (191.9 km) ===
| Place | Stage 7 | | General Classification | |
| Place | Name | Time | Name | Time |
|---|---|---|---|---|
| 1. | Luis Alberto González (COL) | 05:02.22 | | |

=== 1994-03-23: Pereira — Armenia (47.5 km) ===
| Place | Stage 8 (Individual Time Trial) | | General Classification | |
| Place | Name | Time | Name | Time |
|---|---|---|---|---|
| 1. | Chepe González (COL) | 01:04.29 | Chepe González (COL) | ???????? |
| 2. | Carlos Jaramillo (COL) | +0.18 | Luis Alberto González (COL) | +1.31 |
| 3. | Efraím Rico (COL) | +0.49 | Álvaro Sierra (COL) | +1.32 |

=== 1994-03-24: Armenia — Ibagué (140 km) ===
| Place | Stage 9 | | General Classification | |
| Place | Name | Time | Name | Time |
|---|---|---|---|---|
| 1. | Jairo Hernández (COL) | ?????? | | |

=== 1994-03-25: Ibagué — Neiva (210 km) ===
| Place | Stage 10 | | General Classification | |
| Place | Name | Time | Name | Time |
|---|---|---|---|---|
| 1. | Ruber Marín (COL) | 05:14.56 | | |

=== 1994-03-26: Neiva — Girardot (175.4 km) ===
| Place | Stage 11 | | General Classification | |
| Place | Name | Time | Name | Time |
|---|---|---|---|---|
| 1. | Hernán Buenahora (COL) | 04:06.25 | Chepe González (COL) | 48:03.10 |
| 2. | | | Álvaro Sierra (COL) | +1.17 |
| 3. | | | Celio Roncancio (COL) | +1.53 |

=== 1994-03-27: Girardot — Alto de Patios (152.6 km) ===
| Place | Stage 12 | | General Classification | |
| Place | Name | Time | Name | Time |
|---|---|---|---|---|
| 1. | Efraím Rico (COL) | 04:24.44 | Chepe González (COL) | 52:27.57 |
| 2. | Carlos Jaramillo (COL) | +0.03 | Álvaro Sierra (COL) | +1.18 |
| 3. | Chepe González (COL) | +0.03 | Carlos Jaramillo (COL) | +1.57 |

== Final classification ==
| RANK | NAME | TEAM | TIME |
|---|---|---|---|
| 1. | Chepe González (COL) | Manzana Postobón | 52:27:57 |
| 2. | Álvaro Sierra (COL) | Gaseosas Glacial | + 1.18 |
| 3. | Carlos Jaramillo (COL) | Lotería de Medellín | + 1.57 |
| 4. | Celio Roncancio (COL) | Gaseosas Glacial | + 2.06 |
| 5. | Efraím Rico (COL) | Manzana Postobón | + 3.46 |
| 6. | Óscar Vargas (COL) | Lotería de Medellín | + 5.08 |
| 7. | Pedro Rodríguez (ECU) | Pony Malta-Avianca | + 7.55 |
| 8. | Juan Javier Castillo (COL) | Pony Malta-Avianca | + 11.59 |
| 9. | Héctor Palacio (COL) | Manzana Postobón | + 12.55 |
| 10. | Josué López (COL) | Gaseosas Glacial | + 14.34 |

== Teams ==
Lotería de Medellín-AA

1. (Colombia) Carlos Jaramillo
2. (Colombia) Néstor Barrera
3. (Colombia) Óscar Vargas
4. (Colombia) Héctor Castaño
5. (Colombia) Juan Diego Ramírez
6. (Colombia) Jorge Otálvaro
7. (Colombia) Javier Zapata
8. (Colombia) Héctor Castaño
9. (Colombia) Argiro Zapata
10. (Colombia) Raúl Acosta

Cerveza Aguila-Kelme

11. (Colombia) Hernán Buenahora
12. (Colombia) Libardo Niño
13. (Colombia) Augusto González
14. (Colombia) Jair Bernal
15. (Colombia) Federico Muñoz
16. (Colombia) Néstor Mora
17. (Colombia) Olmedo Capacho
18. (Colombia) Óscar Jurado
19. (Colombia) Nélson Ramírez

Gaseosas Glacial PRF

21. (Colombia) Luis Alberto González
22. (Colombia) Josué López
23. (Colombia) Celio Roncancio
24. (Colombia) Álvaro Sierra
25. (Colombia) Miguel Ángel Sanabria
26. (Colombia) Luciano Bonilla
27. (Colombia) José Fabio Moreno
28. (Colombia) Israel Ochoa
29. (Colombia) Armando Moreno
30. (Colombia) Santiago Amador

Manzana Postobón PRF

31. (Colombia) Edgar Humberto Ruiz
32. (Colombia) Chepe González
33. (Colombia) José Martín Farfán
34. (Colombia) Efraím Rico
35. (Colombia) Gerardo Moncada
36. (Colombia) Ruber Marín
37. (Colombia) Héctor Palacio
38. (Colombia) Julio César Aguirre
39. (Colombia) Julio Ernesto Bernal
40. (Colombia) Hernán Patiño

Quintanilha (PRF)-Lotería de Boyacá

41. (Portugal) José Quintanilha
42. (Portugal) Alfonso Quintanilha
43. (Colombia) Fabio Rodríguez
44. (Colombia) Fabio Arenas

Pilsener Ecuador

51. (Ecuador) Juan Carlos Rosero
52. (Ecuador) Héctor Chiles
53. (Ecuador) Marco Pita
54. (Colombia) Carlos Arturo Vargas
55. (Ecuador) Raúl Huera
56. (Ecuador) Pablo Perugachi
57. (Kazakhstan) Daulet Sapazhanov
58. (Colombia) Raúl Gómez Suárez

Pony Malta de Bavaria-Avianca

61. (Colombia) Omar Trompa
62. (Colombia) Víctor Hugo Bolívar
63. (Ecuador) Pedro Rodríguez
64. (Colombia) José Castelblanco
65. (Colombia) José Ibáñez
66. (Colombia) Jairo Hernández
67. (Colombia) Eduardo Guerrero
68. (Colombia) Adolfo Rico
69. (Colombia) Diego Garavito
70. (Colombia) Juan Javier Castillo

Agua Natural Glacial

71. (Colombia) Orlando Ortegón
72. (Colombia) Edward Ruiz
73. (Colombia) Miguel Ángel Niño
74. (Colombia) Henry Pérez
75. (Colombia) Héctor Sierra
76. (Colombia) Julio Manuel Cubides
77. (Colombia) Urbelino Mesa
78. (Colombia) Víctor Ángel Becerra
79. (Colombia) Jairo Torres
80. (Colombia) Luis Samacá

Ron Medellín-Lotería de Medellín

81. (Colombia) Elder Herrera
82. (Colombia) Jaime Bolívar
83. (Colombia) Marco Isaías
84. (Colombia) Francisco Orozco
85. (Colombia) Germán Ospina
86. (Colombia) Ramón García
87. (Colombia) John Freddy Garcés
88. (Colombia) John Freddy Restrepo
89. (Colombia) Gildardo Sepúlveda
90. (Colombia) Luis Eduardo Acevedo

Manzana Postobón Aficionado

91. (Colombia) Elkin Barrera
92. (Colombia) Bernardo Pedraza
93. (Colombia) Asdrúbal Patiño
94. (Colombia) Iván López
95. (Colombia) Luis Alfredo López
96. (Colombia) Alexis Rojas
97. (Colombia) José Luis Vanegas
98. (Colombia) Juan Alberto Robayo

Cicloases (7)

102. (Colombia) Javier Rincón
103. (Colombia) Ricardo Sánchez
108. (Colombia) Carlos Saavedra
