= 1996 Clásico RCN =

Race details
- Dates: March 16 – March 25
- Stages: 9
- Winning time: 44h 07' 20"

Results
	Winner	Israel Ochoa (COL)	(Glacial-Selle Italia)
	Second	Álvaro Lozano (COL)	(Manzana Postobón)
	Third	Jair Bernal (COL)	(Todos por Boyacá)
	Points	Ruber Marín (COL)	(Manzana Postobón)
	Mountains	Félix Cárdenas (COL)	(Pony Malta-Avianca)
	Combination	Otoniel Soto (COL)	(Municipal de Itagüí)
	Team	(Colombia) Glacial-Selle Italia	

The 36th edition of the Clásico RCN was held from Saturday March 16 to Monday March 25, 1996, in Colombia.

== Stages ==
=== 1996-03-16: Urena — Cúcuta (8 km) ===
Place	Prologue		General Classification	
Place	Name	Time	Name	Time
1.	Dubán Ramírez (COL)	07.30	Dubán Ramírez (COL)	07.30
2.	Raúl Montaña (COL)	+0.13	Raúl Montaña (COL)	+0.13
3.	Henry Cárdenas (COL)	+0.13	Henry Cárdenas (COL)	+0.13

=== 1996-03-17: Cúcuta — Bucaramanga (210 km) ===
Place	Stage 1		General Classification	
Place	Name	Time	Name	Time
1.	Israel Ochoa (COL)	????	Israel Ochoa (COL)	????
2.			Álvaro Lozano (COL)	+1.44
3.			José Castelblanco (COL)	+3.23

=== 1996-03-18: Bucaramanga — Barbosa (210 km) ===
Place	Stage 2		General Classification	
Place	Name	Time	Name	Time
1.	Henry Cárdenas (COL)	06:10.16	Israel Ochoa (COL)	12:02.48
2.	Ruber Marín (COL)	—	Álvaro Lozano (COL)	+1.50
3.	Carlos Contreras (COL)	—	José Castelblanco (COL)	+3.29

=== 1996-03-19: Barbosa — Leona en Tocancipa (170 km) ===
Place	Stage 3		General Classification	
Place	Name	Time	Name	Time
1.	Félix Cárdenas (COL)	04:52.03	Israel Ochoa (COL)	16:54.51
2.	Ruber Marín (COL)	—	Álvaro Lozano (COL)	+1.50
3.	Ismael Sarmiento (COL)	—	José Castelblanco (COL)	+3.29

=== 1996-03-20: Cajica — Zipaquirá (172 km) ===
Place	Stage 4		General Classification	
Place	Name	Time	Name	Time
1.	Julio César Aguirre (COL)	04:36.38	Israel Ochoa (COL)	21:31.49
2.	Félix Cárdenas (COL)	+0.20	Álvaro Lozano (COL)	+1.50
3.	Carlos Contreras (COL)	—	José Castelblanco (COL)	+3.29

=== 1996-03-21: Mosquera — Ibagué (185 km) ===
Place	Stage 5		General Classification	
Place	Name	Time	Name	Time
1.	Julio Ernesto Bernal (COL)	04:32.18	Israel Ochoa (COL)	26:06.04
2.	Heberth Gutiérrez (COL)	+0.04	Álvaro Lozano (COL)	+1.20
3.	Ramón García (COL)	+0.16	Dubán Ramírez (COL)	+4.05

=== 1996-03-22: Ibagué — Buga (207.9 km) ===
Place	Stage 6		General Classification	
Place	Name	Time	Name	Time
1.	Jair Bernal (COL)	05:22.50	Israel Ochoa (COL)	31:30.25
2.	Ruber Marín (COL)	+0.31	Álvaro Lozano (COL)	+1.20
3.	Henry Cárdenas (COL)	—	Dubán Ramírez (COL)	+4.05

=== 1996-03-23: Buga — Pereira (208 km) ===
Place	Stage 7		General Classification	
Place	Name	Time	Name	Time
1.	Carlos Alberto Silva (COL)	05:39.01	Israel Ochoa (COL)	37:14.43
2.	Alexis Rojas (COL)	—	Álvaro Lozano (COL)	+1.20
3.	Héctor Castaño (COL)	—	Dubán Ramírez (COL)	+4.00

=== 1996-03-24: Santa Rosa de Cabal — Alto de Las Palmas (206 km) ===
Place	Stage 8		General Classification	
Place	Name	Time	Name	Time
1.	Chepe González (COL)	???????	Israel Ochoa (COL)	???????

=== 1996-03-25: Medellín — Santa Helena (16 km) ===
Place	Stage 9 (Individual Time Trial)		General Classification	
Place	Name	Time	Name	Time
1.	Jair Bernal (COL)	00:39.20	Israel Ochoa (COL)	44:07.20
2.	Álvaro Sierra (COL)	+1.18	Álvaro Lozano (COL)	+1.37
3.	Luis Alberto González (COL)	+1.38	Jair Bernal (COL)	+1.54

== Final classification ==
RANK	NAME	TEAM	TIME
1.	Israel Ochoa (COL)	Gaseosas Glacial-Selle Italia	44:07:20
2.	Álvaro Lozano (COL)	Todos por Boyacá	+ 1.37
3.	Jair Bernal (COL)	Todos por Boyacá	+ 1.54
4.	Julio César Aguirre (COL)	Pony Malta-Avianca	+ 2.38
5.	Celio Roncancio (COL)	Gaseosas Glacial-Selle Italia	+ 3.27
6.	Álvaro Sierra (COL)	Gaseosas Glacial-Selle Italia	+ 3.41
7.	Luis Alberto González (COL)	Manzana Postobón	+ 4.43
8.	Germán Ospina (COL)	Orgullo Paisa	+ 4.44
9.	Henry Cárdenas (COL)	Gaseosas Glacial-Selle Italia	+ 4.53
10.	Héctor Palacio (COL)	Aguardiente Antioqueño-Loteria de Medellín	+ 5.36

== See also ==
- 1996 Vuelta a Colombia
