= 2003 Clásico RCN =

Race details
- Dates: August 24–31
- Stages: 8
- Distance: 1,232.9 km (766.1 mi)
- Winning time: 31h 10' 02"

Results
	Winner	José Castelblanco (COL)	(Colombia Selle Italia)
	Second	Álvaro Sierra (COL)	(Aguardiente Antioqueño)
	Third	Jairo Hernández (COL)	(Equipo Orbitel)
	Points	John Parra (COL)	(Aguardiente Antioqueño)
	Mountains	Álvaro Sierra (COL)	(Aguardiente Antioqueño)
	Young rider	José Rujano (VEN)	(Colombia-Selle Italia)
	Combination	Marlon Pérez (COL)	(Orbitel 05)
	Team	Aguardiente Antioqueño-Lotería de Medellín	

The 43rd edition of the annual Clásico RCN was held from August 24 to August 31, 2003, in Colombia. The stage race with an UCI rate of 2.3 started in Medellín and finished in Bogotá. RCN stands for "Radio Cadena Nacional".

== Stages ==
=== 2003-08-24: Medellín — Carmen de Viboral (111.5 km) ===
Place	Stage 1		General Classification	
Place	Name	Time	Name	Time
1.	Marlon Pérez (COL)	02:51.57	Marlon Pérez (COL)	02:51.47
2.	John Parra (COL)	—	John Parra (COL)	+0.03
3.	Israel Ochoa (COL)	—	Israel Ochoa (COL)	+0.04

=== 2003-08-25: Sabaneta — Manizales (184.8 km) ===
Place	Stage 2		General Classification	
Place	Name	Time	Name	Time
1.	Javier González (COL)	05:11.00	Félix Cárdenas (COL)	08:03.53
2.	Félix Cárdenas (COL)	+1.03	Óscar Álvarez (COL)	+0.05
3.	Óscar Álvarez (COL)	+1.05	Hernán Buenahora (COL)	+0.09

=== 2003-08-26: Pereira — Cali (204 km) ===
Place	Stage 3		General Classification	
Place	Name	Time	Name	Time
1.	John Parra (COL)	04:32.39	Félix Cárdenas (COL)	12:39.40
2.	Jairo Pérez (COL)	—	Óscar Álvarez (COL)	+0.05
3.	Graciano Fonseca (COL)	+0.23	Hernán Buenahora (COL)	+0.09

=== 2003-08-27: Buga — Ibagué (191.8 km) ===
Place	Stage 4		General Classification	
Place	Name	Time	Name	Time
1.	José Rujano (VEN)	05:40.48	Hernán Buenahora (COL)	18:22.10
2.	Daniel Rincón (COL)	+0.02	José Castelblanco (COL)	+0.02
3.	Néstor Bernal (COL)	+1.23	Álvaro Sierra (COL)	+0.02

=== 2003-08-28: Ibagué — Mosquera (194.8 km) ===
Place	Stage 5		General Classification	
Place	Name	Time	Name	Time
1.	Néstor Bernal (COL)	04:49.14	Hernán Buenahora (COL)	23:13.47
2.	Daniel Rincón (COL)	+1.55	José Castelblanco (COL)	+0.02
3.	Marlon Pérez (COL)	—	Álvaro Sierra (COL)	+0.02

=== 2003-08-29: Chia — Villa de Leyva (162.2 km) ===
Place	Stage 6		General Classification	
Place	Name	Time	Name	Time
1.	Javier Zapata (COL)	03:30.31	Jairo Hernández (COL)	26:45.17
2.	Jairo Hernández (COL)	—	Hernán Buenahora (COL)	+1.16
3.	Hernán Buenahora (COL)	+2.20	Álvaro Sierra (COL)	+1.23

=== 2003-08-30: Villa de Leyva — Tunja (41.4 km) ===
Place	Stage 7 (Individual Time Trial)		General Classification	
Place	Name	Time	Name	Time
1.	José Castelblanco (COL)	01:06.26	José Castelblanco (COL)	27:53.08
2.	Álvaro Sierra (COL)	+1.15	Álvaro Sierra (COL)	+1.13
3.	Félix Cárdenas (COL)	+1.18	Jairo Hernández (COL)	+3.02

=== 2003-08-31: Tunja — Bogotá (142.4 km) ===
Place	Stage 8		General Classification	
Place	Name	Time	Name	Time
1.	Félix Cárdenas (COL)	03:16.48	José Castelblanco (COL)	31:10.02
2.	Daniel Rincón (COL)	+0.04	Álvaro Sierra (COL)	+1.07
3.	Álvaro Sierra (COL)	—	Jairo Hernández (COL)	+3.21

== Final classification ==
RANK	NAME	TEAM	TIME
1.	José Castelblanco (COL)	Colombia Selle Italia	31:10:02
2.	Álvaro Sierra (COL)	Lotería de Medellin	+ 1.07
3.	Jairo Hernández (COL)	Equipo Orbitel	+ 3.21
4.	Félix Cárdenas (COL)	Equipo Orbitel	+ 3.41
5.	Hernán Buenahora (COL)	Equipo Orbitel	+ 5.47
6.	Daniel Rincón (COL)	Lotería de Boyacá	+ 9.28
7.	Mauricio Ortega (COL)	Lotería de Medellin	+ 9.46
8.	Néstor Bernal (COL)	Coldeportes Boyacá Ag Lider	+ 10.41
9.	Marlon Pérez (COL)	Equipo Orbitel	+ 24.38
10.	Ismael Sarmiento (COL)	Lotería de Boyacá	+ 31.40

== Teams ==
Colombia — Selle Italia

1. (Colombia) José Castelblanco
2. (Colombia) Hernán Darío Muñoz
3. (Colombia) Ruber Marín
4. (Colombia) Carlos Ibáñez
5. (Colombia) Óscar Henao
6. (Colombia) Edilberto Suárez
7. (Colombia) Hugo Osorio
8. (Colombia) Jhon García
9. (Venezuela) José Rujano
10. (Colombia) Freddy Paredes

Lotería de Boyacá

11. (Colombia) Libardo Niño
12. (Colombia) Israel Ochoa
13. (Colombia) Daniel Rincón
14. (Colombia) Ismael Sarmiento
15. (Colombia) Miguel Ángel Sanabria
16. (Colombia) Víctor Becerra
17. (Colombia) Graciano Fonseca
18. (Colombia) Giovanny Báez
19. (Colombia) Jairo Pérez
20. (Colombia) Ricardo Mesa

Orbitel 05

21. (Colombia) Félix Cárdenas
22. (Colombia) Hernán Buenahora
23. (Colombia) Carlos Contreras
24. (Colombia) Jairo Hernández
25. (Colombia) Marlon Pérez
26. (Colombia) Heberth Gutiérrez
27. (Colombia) Elder Herrera
28. (Colombia) Javier Zapata
29. (Colombia) Hernán Bonilla

Aguardiente Antioqueño — Lotería de Medellín

31. (Colombia) Oved Ramírez
32. (Colombia) Óscar Álvarez
33. (Colombia) Mauricio Ortega
34. (Colombia) John Parra
35. (Colombia) Álvaro Sierra
36. (Colombia) John Durango
37. (Colombia) Argiro Zapata
38. (Colombia) Juan Diego Ramírez
39. (Colombia) Juan Carlos López
40. (Colombia) Francisco Colorado

Cundeportes — Juegos Nacionales

41. (Colombia) Alexis Rojas
42. (Colombia) José Luis Vanegas
43. (Colombia) Edward Ruiz
44. (Colombia) José Ignacio Rodríguez
45. (Colombia) Juan Barrero
46. (Colombia) Víctor Herrera
47. (Colombia) Gerardo Rodríguez
48. (Colombia) Juan Fonseca
49. (Colombia) Alexánder Roa
50. (Colombia) Walter Pedraza

Coldeportes Boyacá — Aguardiente Líder

51. (Colombia) Víctor Niño
52. (Colombia) Néstor Bernal
53. (Colombia) José Ibáñez
54. (Colombia) Emiro Matta
55. (Colombia) Carlos Blanco
56. (Colombia) Wilson Cepeda

Orbitel 05

61. (Colombia) Javier Alberto González
62. (Colombia) Alejandro Cortés
63. (Colombia) Julio César Aguirre
64. (Colombia) Johnny Leal
65. (Colombia) Jorge Humberto Martínez
66. (Colombia) Olmedo Capacho

Ciclo Acosta — Bello — Gripogen — Seres

71. (Colombia) Stiver Ortíz
72. (Colombia) Nélson Vargas
73. (Colombia) Víctor Benítez
74. (Colombia) Julián Rodas
75. (Colombia) Wilmer Baena
76. (Colombia) Sandro Ardila
77. (Colombia) Álvaro Montoya
78. (Colombia) Édgar Restrepo
79. (Colombia) Jorge Iván González

Club Rotarios de Bello

81. (Colombia) Paulo Vélez
82. (Colombia) Carlos Eduardo Sánchez
83. (Colombia) Luis Cely
84. (Colombia) Johan Ramírez
85. (Colombia) Pedro Zapata
86. (Colombia) Juan Agudelo
87. (Colombia) Diego Montoya
88. (Colombia) Vladimir Zapata

Cicloases Cundinamarca

91. (Colombia) Jimmy Martínez
92. (Colombia) Alvaro Puentes
93. (Colombia) Oscar Bolívar
94. (Colombia) José Dionisio Sánchez
95. (Colombia) Elberth Garay
96. (Colombia) Carlos Albarracín
97. (Colombia) Fabio Montenegro
98. (Colombia) Gerson Sánchez
99. (Colombia) Miguel Angel Cendales

Mixto Uno

101. (Colombia) Alexis Castro
102. (Colombia) Vladimir González
103. (Colombia) Urbelino Mesa
104. (Colombia) Edwin Ortíz
105. (Colombia) Asis Velásquez
106. (Colombia) Luis Yepes
107. (Colombia) Deivy Ibáñez
108. (Colombia) Luis Gil
109. (Colombia) Germán Herrera
110. (Colombia) Arles Tabares

Mixto Dos

111. (Colombia) Santo Álvarez
112. (Colombia) Héctor Jaime Ríos
113. (Colombia) Ricael Orozco
114. (Colombia) Leonel Bonilla
115. (Colombia) Juan Carlos Castro
116. (Colombia) Edwin Amaya
117. (Colombia) Edwin Roa
118. (Colombia) Orlando Joya
119. (Colombia) Alejandro Ramírez
120. (Colombia) Andrés Cárdenas

EPM.net-IDEA

121. (Colombia) Ferney Bello
122. (Colombia) Samuel Cabrera
123. (Colombia) Mauricio Neisa
124. (Colombia) Néstor Alvarado
125. (Colombia) Jorge Acosta
126. (Colombia) Juan Botero

== See also ==
- 2003 Vuelta a Colombia
