= Council of the Assemblies of God of Colombia =

Pentecostal Christian denomination in Colombia

- Concilio de las Asambleas de Dios de Colombia
- Classification: Evangelical Christianity
- Theology: Pentecostal
- Associations: World Assemblies of God Fellowship
- Headquarters: Bogotá, Colombia
- Origin: 1958
- Congregations: 1,204
- Members: 356,398
- Official website: adcolombia.org

The Council of the Assemblies of God of Colombia (Spanish: Concilio de las Asambleas de Dios de Colombia) is a Pentecostal Christian denomination in Colombia. It is affiliated with the World Assemblies of God Fellowship. The headquarters in Bogotá.

== History ==
The Council of the Assemblies of God of Colombia has its origins in a mission of Edward Wagner and his wife, Ada, in 1932. They settled in Sogamoso and established the Sogamoso Evangelical Mission. On April 1, 1932, they celebrated their first Pentecostal worship; the service marked the origin of the Assemblies of God of Colombia. The council was founded in 1958, with 18 missionaries, pastors, workers and delegates all participating in the event.

In 2019, it had 1,204 churches and 356,398 members.

== See also ==
- Assemblies of God
