= Íkaro Valderrama =

Ikaro Valderrama
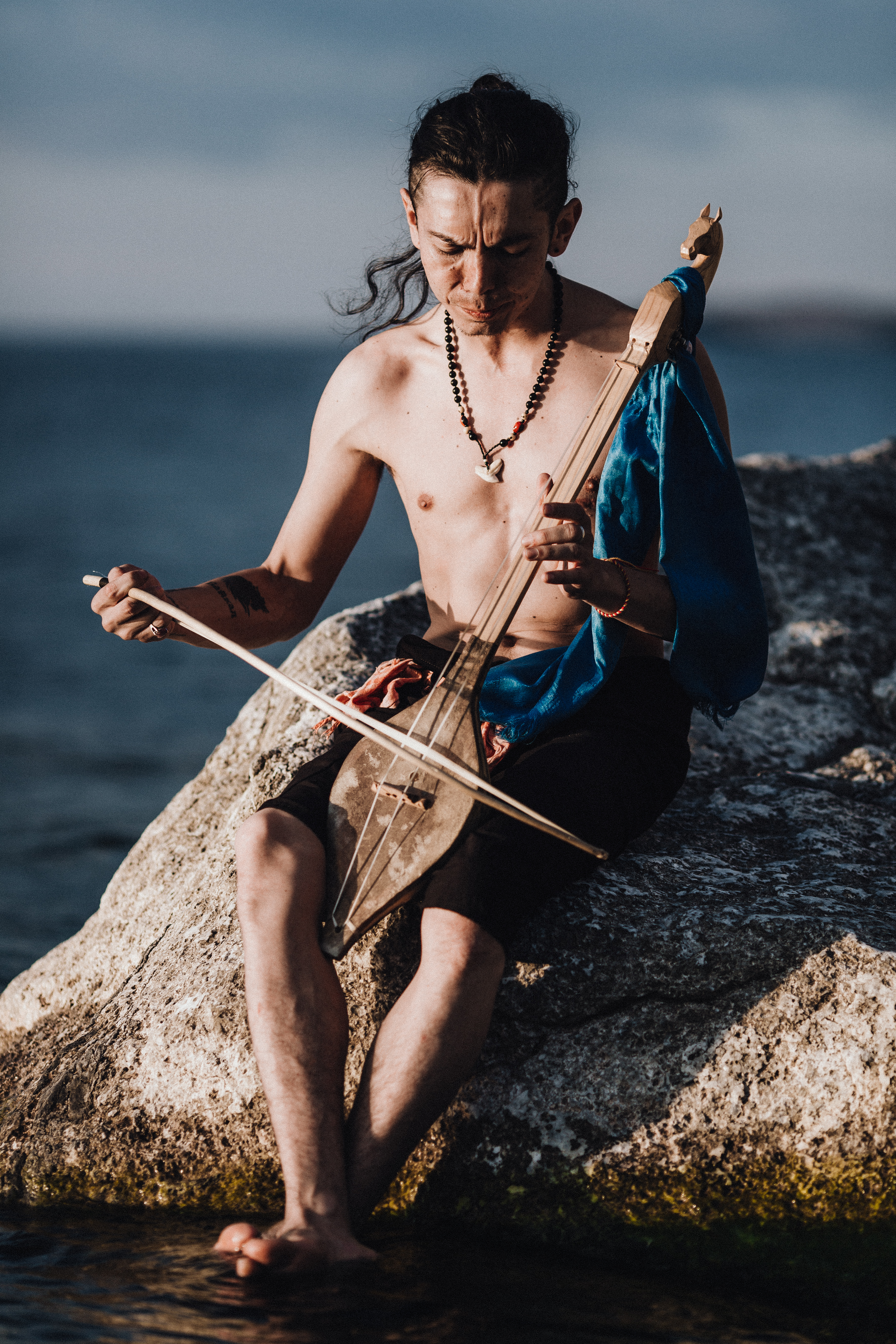

Background information
- Born: Ikaro Valderrama Ortiz; July 17, 1984 (age 41); Sogamoso, Colombia
- Genres: Latino-Siberian, Independent music, Neo-folk
- Instruments: Vocals, tuvan igil, topshur, cuatro venezolano, guitar
- Website: ikarovalderrama.com

Íkaro Valderrama Ortiz (born July 17, 1984, in Sogamoso) is a Colombian singer, writer, composer and multi-instrumentalist. His musical and literary work has influences from Siberia, India and Latin America. He defines himself as a kind of modern nomad, open to explore different geographies, traditions and rhythms. Since 2009 he has been living in a transit between many countries of Latin America and Siberia, assimilating the cultural heritage and developing a unique style of music. Íkaro has studied different kinds and techniques of singing, and he plays a wide range of musical instruments from different countries.

== Published works ==
- La Ciencia Métrica de los Placeres (The metric Science of Pleasures)
- Cuentos de Minicuentos.
- Ventanas del Silencio (Windows of Silence).
- Siberia en tus ojos (Siberia into your eyes)

== Discography ==
- TransBaikal 2.1 (2014)
- Sonido Nómada. With the singer from Altai Republic, Arina Tadyrova (2013)
