= Pedro Rodríguez (cyclist, born 1966) =

Ecuadorian cyclist

Personal information
- Full name: Pedro Álvaro Rodríguez Rosero
- Nickname: "El Aguila de Tulcán"
- Born: 18 October 1966 (age 59) Tulcán, Ecuador

Cycling career
- Sport: Cycling
- Current team: Retired
- Discipline: Road
- Role: Rider

Professional team
- 1992–1995: Pony Malta–Avianca

Pedro Álvaro Rodríguez Rosero (born 18 October 1966) is a retired Ecuadorian road cyclist, who was a professional from 1992 to 1995. Nicknamed "El Aguila de Tulcán", he competed for his native South American country at the 1996 Summer Olympics in Atlanta, Georgia in the men's road race, alongside Héctor Chiles and Paulo Caicedo.

== Major results ==
1988
1st Overall Vuelta al Ecuador
1990
1st Overall Vuelta al Ecuador
1991
1st Overall Vuelta al Ecuador
1993
1st Overall Vuelta al Ecuador
7th Overall Vuelta a Colombia
1994
1st Stage 7 Clásico RCN
7th Overall Vuelta a Colombia
1995
1st Overall Vuelta al Ecuador
1st Overall Vuelta a Mendoza
1st Prologue & Stage 5 Vuelta a Colombia
3rd Overall Clásico RCN
