= Carlos Silva (cyclist) =

Colombian cyclist

Carlos Alberto Silva Silva (born 4 July 1974 in vereda Bodoquero, Florencia, Caquetá) is a male professional road racing cyclist from Colombia.

== Career ==
1996
1st in Stage 7 Clásico RCN, Ibagué (COL)
2001
1st in Stage 6 Vuelta Ciclista del Uruguay, Mercedes (URU)
2002
1st in Stage 5 Rutas de América, Paysandu (URU)
2003
1st in Stage 6 Rutas de América, Young Trinidad (URU)
1st in Stage 3 Vuelta Ciclista del Uruguay, Treinta y tres (URU)
3rd in Stage 4 Vuelta Ciclista del Uruguay, Minas (URU)
2004
1st in Stage 2 Vuelta Ciclista del Uruguay, Rocha (URU
