= Luis Cárdenas (cyclist) =

Colombian cyclist (born 1967)

Luis Germán Cárdenas Amaya (born January 10, 1967) is a retired male road cyclist from Colombia.

== Career ==
Year	Event	Placed
1991	General Classification Clásica Ciudad de Girardot (COL)	1st
1993	General Classification Vuelta a El Salvador (ESA)	1st
1995	Stage 3 Vuelta a Colombia, Mariquita (COL)	1st
