= Efraím Rico =

Colombian cyclist

Efraím Rico Lizarazo (born December 3, 1967, in Villapinzón, Cundinamarca) is a retired male road cyclist from Colombia, who was a professional rider from 1990 to 1998. He was nicknamed "El Cuerito" during his career.

== Career ==
1988
1st in General Classification Vuelta Ciclista a Costa Rica (CRC)
1994
3rd in Stage 8 Vuelta a Colombia, Armenia (COL)
1st in Stage 12 Vuelta a Colombia, Alto de Patios (COL)
5th in General Classification Vuelta a Colombia (COL)
1995
1st in Stage 1 Clásico RCN, Pereira (COL)
3rd in Stage 5 Clásico RCN, Mosquera (COL)
3rd in Stage 7 Clásico RCN, Duitama (COL)
9th in General Classification Clásico RCN (COL)
2nd in Stage 9 Vuelta a Colombia, Buga (COL)
1st in Colombia National Championships, Road, Elite, Colombia (COL)
1996
7th in General Classification Vuelta a Colombia (COL)
