= Leonardo Cardona =

Colombian cyclist

Leonardo Jesús Cardona Palacio (born October 8, 1971, in Envigado, Antioquia) is a retired male road bicycle racer and track cyclist from Colombia, who became a professional rider in 1995.

== Career ==
1990
(bronze) in Pan American Championships, Track, Points Race, Duitama (COL)
1994
(gold) in Pan American Championships, Track, Points Race, Curicó (CHI)
1995
1st in Stage 7 Vuelta a Colombia, Cali (COL)
1997
1st in Stage 13 Vuelta a Colombia, Circuito Bogotá (COL)
