= Freddy Moncada =

Colombian cyclist (born 1973)

Fredy Alonso Moncada Torres (born 10 November 1973 in Vélez, Santander) is a retired male road cyclist from Colombia. He won stages in the 1997 Vuelta a Colombia and the 2000 Vuelta a Venezuela.
