= Carlos Humberto Cabrera =

Colombian racing cyclist

- Born: November 28, 1973 (age 52); Neiva, Huila, Colombia
- Cycling career
- Sport: Cycling
- Discipline: Road racing
- Role: Rider

Carlos Humberto Cabrera Polo (born November 28, 1973, in Neiva, Huila) is a retired male road racing cyclist from Colombia, who became a professional rider in 1996.

== Career ==
1994
1st in General Classification Vuelta a Chiriquí (PAN)
1995
1st in Stage 10 Vuelta a Colombia, Armenia (COL)
1996
1st in Stage 5 Vuelta a Colombia, Puerto Boyacá (COL)
