= Luis Alberto González =

Colombian cyclist

Luis Alberto González Gallego (born July 27, 1965, in Palestina, Caldas) is a retired male road cyclist from Colombia, who was a professional from 1987 to 1996.

== Career ==
1987
1st in General Classification Vuelta al Valle del Cauca (COL)
1988
1st in General Classification Vuelta a Cundinamarca (COL)
1989
1st in General Classification Vuelta a Boyacá (COL)
1992
3rd in General Classification Vuelta a Colombia (COL)
1st in General Classification Vuelta a Cundinamarca (COL)
1993
4th in General Classification Vuelta a Colombia (COL)
1st in General Classification Clásico RCN (COL)
1st in General Classification Vuelta a Cundinamarca (COL)
1994
1st in Stage 7 Vuelta a Colombia, Pereira (COL)
1st in Colombia National Championships, Road, Elite, Colombia (COL)
1st in Colombia National Championships, Road, ITT, Elite, Colombia (COL)
1995
1st in Stage 8 Vuelta a Colombia, Buenaventura (COL)
8th in General Classification Vuelta a Colombia (COL)
1996
7th in General Classification Clásico RCN (COL)
1st in Stage 7 Vuelta a Colombia, Alto de Santa Helena (COL)
3rd in General Classification Vuelta a Colombia (COL)
