= Celio Roncancio =

Colombian racing cyclist

Personal information
- Born: March 12, 1966
- Died: June 8, 2014 (aged 48) Manizales, Caldas, Colombia

Cycling career
- Sport: Cycling
- Discipline: Road racing
- Role: Rider

Celio Roberto Roncancio González (March 12, 1966 – June 8, 2014 in Manizales, Caldas) was a male road racing cyclist from Colombia, who was a professional rider from 1988 to 1997.

== Career ==
1988
10th in General Classification Vuelta a Colombia (COL)
1994
3rd in Stage 5 Vuelta a Colombia, Manizales (COL)
4th in General Classification Vuelta a Colombia (COL)
1995
2nd in Colombia National Championships, Road, Elite, Colombia (COL)
6th in General Classification Clásico RCN (COL)
1996
1st in Colombia National Championships, Road, Elite, Colombia (COL)
5th in General Classification Clásico RCN (COL)
1997
3rd in Stage 11 Vuelta a Colombia, Puerto Salgar (COL)
10th in General Classification Clásico RCN (COL)
