= Noé Hermán Camacho =

Mexican racing cyclist

Personal information
- Born: Mexico

Cycling career
- Sport: Cycling
- Discipline: Racing cyclist
- Role: Rider

Major wins
- 1st in Krem's New Year Cycling Classic (2008)

Noé Hermán Camacho is a Mexican professional racing cyclist.

== Career highlights ==
1. 2008: 1º in Krem's New Year Cycling Classic (BIZ)

== See also ==
- Glossary of cycling
- Outline of cycling
