= Luis Alfredo López (cyclist) =

Colombian racing cyclist (born 1966)

Luis Alfredo López Pedraza (born April 2, 1966, in Sogamoso) is a retired male road cyclist from Colombia.

== Career ==
1995
1st in General Classification Vuelta a Venezuela (VEN)
1st in Stage 2 Clásico RCN, Cali (COL)
