= Julio Ernesto Bernal =

Colombian cyclist

Julio Ernesto Bernal González (born April 16, 1966 in Anolaima, Cundinamarca) is a retired male road cyclist from Colombia, who was a professional rider from 1994 to 2002.

== Career ==
1991
1st in General Classification Vuelta a Venezuela (VEN)
1992
1st in General Classification Vuelta a Venezuela (VEN)
1993
3rd in Central American and Caribbean Games, Road, ITT, Ponce (PUR)
1994
1st in Prologue Vuelta a Colombia, Ocaña (COL)
1996
1st in Stage 5 Clásico RCN, Ibagué (COL)
1997
1st in Stage 6 Vuelta a Colombia, Cali Circuito Panamericano (COL)
1998
(bronze) in Pan American Championships, Road, ITT, Elite
2000
1st in General Classification Vuelta Ciclista a la Republica del Ecuador (ECU)
2001
1st in Stage 5 Vuelta al Táchira, San Cristóbal (VEN)
