= Álvaro Sierra =

Colombian cyclist (born 1967)

Personal information
- Full name: Álvaro Sierra Peña
- Born: 4 April 1967 (age 59) Sogamoso, Boyacá, Colombia

Cycling career
- Sport: Cycling
- Current team: Retired
- Discipline: Road
- Role: Rider

Amateur teams
- 1988: Pinturas Philaac
- 1999: Aguardiente Néctar–Cundinamarca
- 2000–2002: Lotería de Boyacá
- 2003: Aguardiente Antioqueño–Lotería de Medellín
- 2004–2005: 05 Orbitel
- 2006: Lotería de Boyacá
- 2007–2008: EBSA–Coordinadora de Boyacá

Professional teams
- 1989–1990: Café de Colombia
- 1991–1992: Postobón–Manzana–Ryalcao
- 1993–1995: Gaseosas Glacial
- 1996: Glacial–Selle Italia
- 1997–1998: Lotería de Boyacá
- 2000: Aguardiente Néctar–Selle Italia
- 2004: 05 Orbitel

Álvaro Sierra Peña (born 4 April 1967) is a Colombian former professional road racing cyclist.

== Major results ==
1988
6th Overall Vuelta a Colombia

1st Stages 3 & 8

1990
5th Overall Vuelta a Colombia
1991
1st Overall Vuelta a Colombia

1st Stage 8

1992
5th Subida a Urkiola
1993
4th Overall Clásico RCN

1st Stage 6

8th Overall Vuelta a Colombia
1994
2nd Overall Vuelta a Colombia
3rd Overall Vuelta y Ruta de Mexico
4th Overall Clásico RCN
1995
3rd Overall Vuelta a Colombia
1996
6th Overall Clásico RCN
1997
7th Overall Clásico RCN
7th Overall Vuelta a Colombia
1998
1st Overall Vuelta a Antioquia
1st Overall Vuelta a Boyacá
5th Overall Clásico RCN

1st Stage 9

1999
1st Overall Vuelta a Boyacá
2nd Overall Clásico RCN

1st Stage 3

7th Overall Vuelta a Colombia
2000
2nd Overall Vuelta a Boyacá

1st Stage 2

3rd Overall Vuelta a Venezuela
5th Overall Clásico RCN
2001
1st Overall Vuelta a Boyacá
2002
1st Stage 4 Vuelta al Tolima
2nd Overall Vuelta a Boyacá
2003
1st Overall Doble Sucre Potosí GP Cemento Fancesa
1st Overall Doble Copacabana GP Fides

1st Stages 3 & 4

1st Overall Clasica Integración de la Guadua-Gobernación de Risaralda

1st Stage 1

2nd Overall Vuelta a Antioquia

1st Stage 4

2nd Overall Clásico RCN
3rd Overall Vuelta a Colombia
3rd Overall Vuelta a Costa Rica

1st Stages 7 & 10

2004
1st Overall Vuelta a Cundinamarca

1st Stage 2

1st Overall Clásica Club Deportivo Boyacá
5th Overall Clásico RCN
2005
1st Overall Doble Sucre Potosí GP Cemento Fancesa

1st Mountains classification
1st Stages 1 & 2

1st Stage 3 Vuelta a Boyacá
2nd Overall Clásico RCN
3rd Overall Vuelta a Colombia
3rd Overall GP Cootranspensilvania
5th Overall Doble Copacabana GP Fides

1st Mountains classification
1st Stage 4

2006
2nd Overall Doble Sucre Potosí GP Cemento Fancesa
3rd Overall Vuelta a Colombia

1st Stages 8 & 14

3rd Overall Doble Copacabana GP Fides

1st Stage 4

6th Overall Clásico RCN
2007
3rd Overall Doble Sucre Potosí GP Cemento Fancesa
2008
2nd Overall Vuelta al Ecuador
2nd Overall Vuelta a Cundinamarca
3rd Overall Vuelta a Bolivia

1st Stage 7b (ITT)

4th Overall Vuelta a Boyacá
