= Henry Cárdenas =

Colombian cyclist

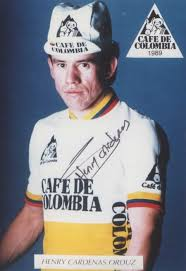

Personal information
- Full name: Henry Cárdenas Ordaz
- Nickname: Cebollita
- Born: 30 October 1965 (age 60) Sogamoso, Boyacá, Colombia

Cycling career
- Sport: Cycling
- Current team: Retired
- Discipline: Road
- Role: Rider

Amateur team
- 1985: Cafam

Professional teams
- 1986–1990: Café de Colombia–Varta
- 1991–1992: Postobón–Manzana–Ryalcao
- 1992: Carrera Jeans–Vagabond
- 1994–1995: Gaseosas Glacial
- 1996: Glacial–Selle Italia
- 1997: Gaseosas Glacial–Caprecom

Henry Cárdenas Ordaz (born 30 October 1965) is a retired road cyclist from Colombia, who was a professional rider from 1986 to 1997. He was nicknamed "Cebollita".

== Major results ==
1985
1st Stage 10 Vuelta a Colombia
1987
2nd Overall Critérium du Dauphiné Libéré

1st Stage 6

9th Overall Vuelta a España
10th Overall Vuelta a Colombia
1988
1st Stage 2 Clásico RCN
1990
9th Overall Vuelta a Colombia
1991
10th Overall Vuelta a Colombia
1995
2nd Overall Clásico RCN

1st Stage 4

1996
1st Stage 2 Clásico RCN

=== Grand Tour general classification results timeline ===
| Grand Tour | 1987 | 1988 | 1989 | 1990 | 1991 | 1992 | 1993 | 1994 | 1995 | 1996 |
|---|---|---|---|---|---|---|---|---|---|---|
| Giro d'Italia | — | — | 44 | — | — | 41 | — | — | — | DNF |
| Tour de France | — | DNF | DNF | — | 43 | — | — | — | — | — |
| Vuelta a España | 9 | — | — | 32 | 26 | DNF | — | — | — | — |
