= Elkin Barrera =

Colombian cyclist

Personal information
- Full name: Elkin Gilberto Barrera Chapparo
- Born: July 6, 1971 (age 55) Sogamoso, Colombia

Cycling career
- Sport: Cycling
- Current team: Retired
- Discipline: Road cycling
- Role: Rider

Elkin Gilberto Barrera Chapparo (born July 6, 1971 in Sogamoso, Boyacá) is a retired male road cyclist from Colombia, who was a professional rider from 1995 to 2000.

== Career ==
1995
4th in General Classification Vuelta a Colombia (COL)
1996
1st in Stage 10 Vuelta a Colombia, Cali (COL)
4th in General Classification Vuelta a Colombia (COL)
1997
1st in Stage 5 Vuelta a Colombia, Sevilla (COL)
2000
1st in Stage 7 Clásico RCN, Madrid (COL)
