= Eduardo Guerrero (cyclist) =

Colombian cyclist

Eduardo Guerrero Cartagena (born February 23, 1971, in Santander, Colombia) is a retired male road racing cyclist from Colombia. He was nicknamed "El Guerrero del Camino" during his career.

== Career ==
1994
1st in Stage 1 Vuelta a Colombia, Bucaramanga (COL)
1999
10th in General Classification Vuelta a Venezuela (VEN)
2000
5th in General Classification Vuelta a Venezuela (VEN)
