= Chepe González =

Colombian cyclist

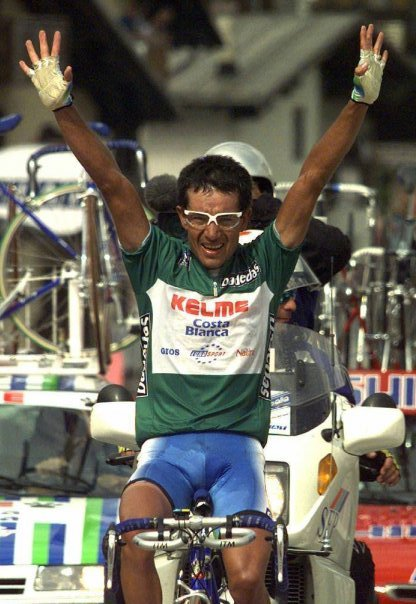

Personal information
- Full name: José Jaime González Pico
- Nickname: Chepe
- Born: July 28, 1968 (age 58) Sogamoso, Colombia
- Height: 1.68 m (5 ft 6 in)
- Weight: 56 kg (123 lb; 8 st 11 lb)

Cycling career
- Sport: Cycling
- Current team: Retired
- Discipline: Road
- Role: Rider
- Rider type: Climbing specialist

Major wins
- Grand Tours Tour de France 1 individual stage (1996) Giro d'Italia Mountains classification (1997, 1999) 2 individual stages (1997, 1999) Stage races Vuelta a Colombia (1994, 1995)

José Jaime González Pico (born July 28, 1968, in Sogamoso, Boyacá), also known as Chepe González, is a Colombian former road bicycle racer. He won stages in Tour de France and Giro d'Italia. He also won the Vuelta a Colombia in 1994 and 1995.

== Major results ==
1990
1st Stage 5 Vuelta a Colombia
1991
2nd Overall Clásico RCN

1st Stages 3 & 7

1992
6th Subida a Urkiola
8th Overall Vuelta a Colombia

1st Stage 5

8th Overall Tour du Limousin
1993
5th Overall Vuelta a Colombia
1994
1st Overall Vuelta a Colombia

1st Points classification
1st Mountains classification
1st Combination classification
1st Stages 5, 6 & 8 (ITT)

1995
1st Overall Vuelta a Colombia

1st Stages 2 & 11

1st Stage 5 Clásico RCN
1996
1st Stage 11 Tour de France
5th Overall Vuelta a Colombia
1997
Giro d'Italia

1st Mountains classification
1st Stage 20

1999
Giro d'Italia

1st Mountains classification
1st Stage 5

1st Stage 7 Vuelta a Colombia
6th Overall Vuelta a La Rioja
8th Overall Vuelta a Aragón
