= Sogamoso =

- Municipality and city
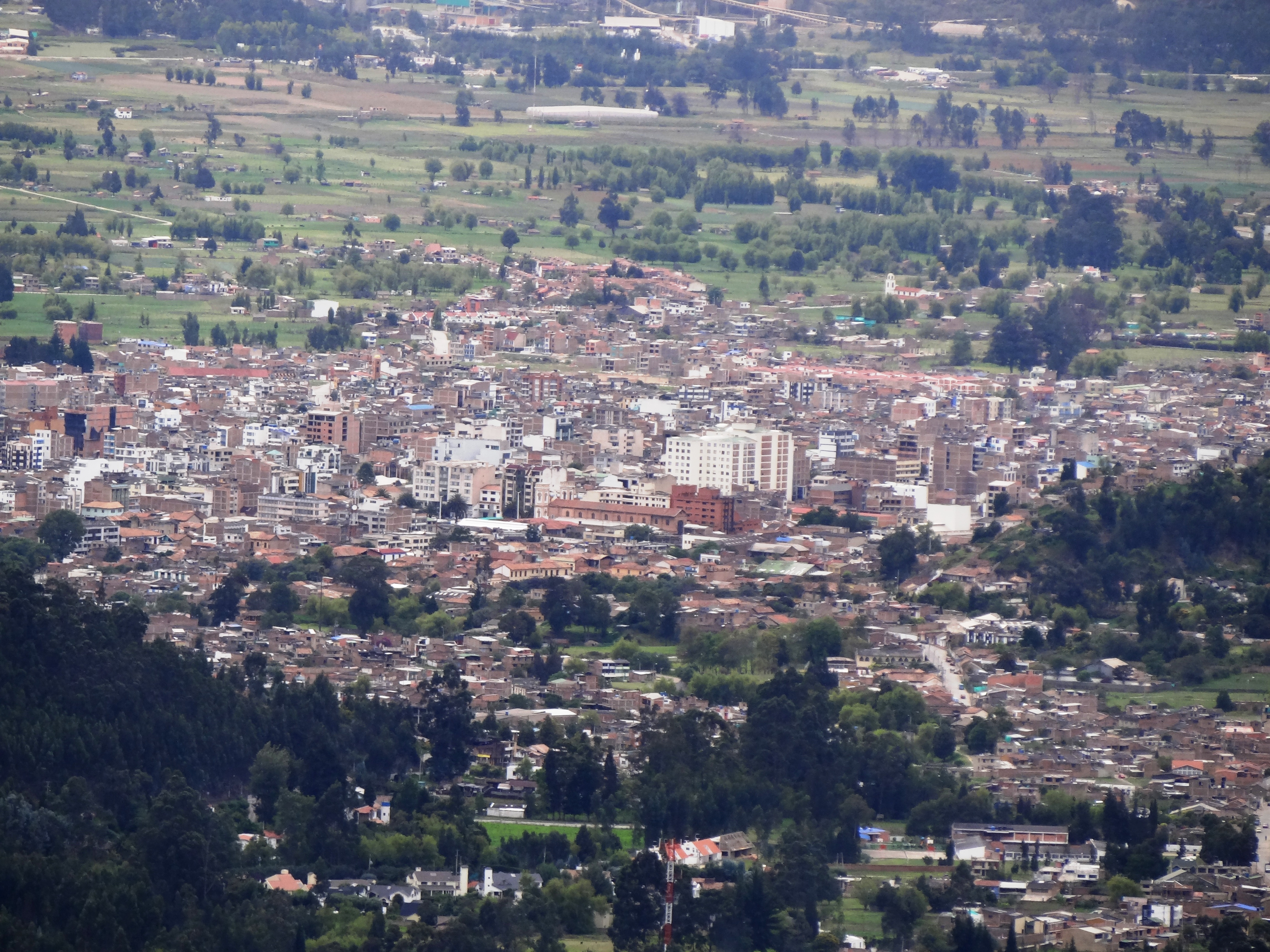
- Aerial view of Sogamoso in the Iraca Valley

- Flag Coat of arms
- Nickname: "City of the Sun"
- Location of the city and municipality of Sogamoso in the Boyaca Department

- Location in Colombia
- Coordinates: 5°43′0″N 72°55′15″W
- Country: Colombia
- Department: Boyacá
- Province: Sugamuxi Province
- Founded: 6 September 1810

Government
  - Mayor: Rigoberto Alfonso Pérez (2020–2023)

Area
  - Municipality and city: 208.3 km^{2} (80.4 sq mi)
  - Urban: 20.87 km^{2} (8.06 sq mi)
- Elevation: 2,569 m (8,428 ft)

Population (2020 est.)
  - Municipality and city: 131,105
  - Density: 629.4/km^{2} (1,630/sq mi)
  - Urban: 116,031
  - Urban density: 5,560/km^{2} (14,400/sq mi)
- Demonym: Sogamoseño/a
- Time zone: UTC-5 (Colombia Standard Time)
- Postal code: 152210-19
- Area code: +8
- Website: Official website

Sogamoso (Spanish pronunciation: [soɣaˈmoso]) is a city in the department of Boyacá of Colombia. It is the capital of the Sugamuxi Province, named after the original Sugamuxi. Sogamoso is nicknamed "City of the Sun", based on the original Muisca tradition of pilgrimage and adoring their Sun god Sué at the Sun Temple. The city is located at an altitude of 2,569 metres (8,428 ft) on the Altiplano Cundiboyacense in the Eastern Ranges of the Colombian Andes.

== Etymology ==
Sogamoso is named after Sugamuxi or Suamox, the original name in Chibcha for the city and Sugamuxi, the last iraca of the sacred City of the Sun. Suamuxi means "Dwelling of the Sun". Knowledge about Sugamuxi has been provided by Pedro Simón and the German countess Gertrud von Podewils Dürniz, in her work Chigys Mie.

== Geographical limits ==
Sogamoso limits with the following municipalities:

- north: Nobsa and Tópaga
- east: Tópaga, Monguí and Aquitania – 3030 m
- south: Aquitania, Cuítiva and Iza
- west: Tibasosa, Firavitoba

== Climate ==
Sogamoso has a subtropical highland climate (Köppen: Cfb) with mild days and cool nights.

Climate data for Sogamoso (Alberto Lleras Camargo Airport), elevation 2,500 m (8,200 ft), (1981–2010)
| Month | Jan | Feb | Mar | Apr | May | Jun | Jul | Aug | Sep | Oct | Nov | Dec | Year |
|---|---|---|---|---|---|---|---|---|---|---|---|---|---|
| Mean daily maximum °C (°F) | 22.7 (72.9) | 22.7 (72.9) | 22.4 (72.3) | 21.5 (70.7) | 21.0 (69.8) | 20.4 (68.7) | 20.0 (68.0) | 20.0 (68.0) | 20.5 (68.9) | 20.9 (69.6) | 21.4 (70.5) | 22.0 (71.6) | 21.3 (70.3) |
| Daily mean °C (°F) | 13.9 (57.0) | 14.2 (57.6) | 14.6 (58.3) | 14.8 (58.6) | 14.6 (58.3) | 14.2 (57.6) | 13.9 (57.0) | 13.8 (56.8) | 13.9 (57.0) | 14.2 (57.6) | 14.6 (58.3) | 14.1 (57.4) | 14.2 (57.6) |
| Mean daily minimum °C (°F) | 3.4 (38.1) | 4.3 (39.7) | 5.9 (42.6) | 7.5 (45.5) | 7.6 (45.7) | 6.7 (44.1) | 5.9 (42.6) | 5.9 (42.6) | 5.6 (42.1) | 6.7 (44.1) | 7.2 (45.0) | 5.0 (41.0) | 6.0 (42.8) |
| Average precipitation mm (inches) | 20.5 (0.81) | 28.5 (1.12) | 63.4 (2.50) | 105.4 (4.15) | 99.3 (3.91) | 56.5 (2.22) | 51.5 (2.03) | 45.2 (1.78) | 60.0 (2.36) | 100.8 (3.97) | 85.9 (3.38) | 26.4 (1.04) | 743.4 (29.27) |
| Average precipitation days | 5 | 6 | 11 | 16 | 17 | 14 | 16 | 14 | 14 | 17 | 14 | 8 | 152 |
| Average relative humidity (%) | 72 | 72 | 74 | 77 | 78 | 77 | 77 | 77 | 77 | 77 | 77 | 74 | 76 |
| Mean monthly sunshine hours | 235.6 | 189.1 | 176.7 | 132.0 | 127.1 | 138.0 | 151.9 | 142.6 | 141.0 | 142.6 | 165.0 | 204.6 | 1,946.2 |
| Mean daily sunshine hours | 7.6 | 6.7 | 5.7 | 4.4 | 4.1 | 4.6 | 4.9 | 4.6 | 4.7 | 4.6 | 5.5 | 6.6 | 5.3 |
Source: Instituto de Hidrologia Meteorologia y Estudios Ambientales

== History ==
Before the Spanish conquest, Suamox, as it was called, was ruled by the iraca of which the last ruler was called Sugamuxi. The city was a place of pilgrimage and the iraca was both priest and ruler housed in the Sun Temple, a richly ornamented temple honouring Sué, the Sun god in the Muisca religion.

=== Conquest and New Kingdom of Granada ===
Gonzalo Jiménez de Quesada was the conquistador of the Muisca Confederation, arriving in Suamox territories (Iraca Valley) in September 1537. Soldiers of De Quesada -according to Spanish chroniclers accidentally- set the Sun Temple on fire. Lucas Fernández de Piedrahita narrates about the march of De Quesada to Suamox, the looting of the city and the fire of the temple of the Sun.

Soon after the conquest, the missionaries began the construction of a chapel that would open the way to the first Catholic church of the time, located on the central square.

Natural scientist Alexander von Humboldt who visited the New Kingdom of Granada at the beginning of the 19th century, wrote about Sogamoso in his chronicles.

==== Suamox in Muisca history ====
History of the Muisca
| Altiplano | Muisca | Art | Architecture | Astronomy | Cuisine | El Dorado | Subsistence | Women | Conquest |

== Administrative division ==
According to the political Map – administrative Number 41ª, del Plan of Territorial Classification 1999–2010, in February of the year 2000, the city was conformed by 18 veredas:

=== Neighbourhoods ===
Sogamoso is composed of 70 neighbourhoods.
l. Alamos del sur 2. Álvaro González Santana 3. Angelmar 4. Benjamín Herrera 5. Campoamor 6. Centro 7. Chapinero 8. Chicamocha 9. Colombia 10. El Cortez 11. El Diamante 12. El Durazno 13. El Jardín 14. El Laguito 15. El Nogal 16. El Oriente 17. El Prado 18. El Recreo 19. El Rosario 20. El Sol 21. El Carmen 22. Gustavo Jiménez Jiménez 23. Jorge Eliécer Gaitán 24. José Antonio Galán 25. Juan José Rondón 26. La Castellana 27. La Esmeralda 28. La Florida 29. La Isla 30. La Pradera 31. La Villita 32. Las Acacias 33. Las Américas 34. Los Alisos 35. Los Alpes 36. Los Arrayanes 37. Los Libertadores 38. Los Rosales 39. Los Sauces 40. Lunapark 41. Magdalena 42. Monquirá 43. Enrique Olaya Herrera 44. Prado Norte 45. Rafael Uribe Uribe 46. San Andresito 47. San Cristóbal 48. San Martín 49. San Martín – Centro 50. Santa Ana – Mochacá 51. Santa Bárbara 52. Santa Catalina 53. Santa Helena 54. Santa Inés 55. San Rafael 56. Santa Isabel 57. Santa Marta 58. Siete de Agosto 59. Simón Bolívar 60. Sucre 61. Sugamuxi 62. Universitario 63. Rafael Valdés Tavera 64. Veinte de Julio 65. Venecia 66. Villa Blanca 67. Villa del Sol 68. Asodea 69. Villa del Lago 70. Valdez Tavera

== Economy ==
The economy of Sogamoso is centered around agriculture, trade, the steel industry and construction materials, and in the exploitation of limestones, marble and coal.

During the years 2007 and 2008, the city had a quick development in urban construction.

=== Transportation ===
Sogamoso is served by Alberto Lleras Camargo Airport. Aerocivil lifted the restriction of air operations in September 2009.

Due to the increase of economic relationships with Bogotá and the rest of the region, the government realised the need to build a highway.

== Education ==
As of 2016, Sogamoso has seven universities:

- Sogamoso Faculty of Pedagogical and Technological University Of Colombia, Universidad Pedagógica y Tecnológica de Colombia (UPTC)
- Open National University at Distance
- University Corporation Remington
- Polytechnic Grancolombiano
- University of Pamplona
- Superior school of Public Administration E.S.A.P.
- Sogamoso Faculty of the University of Boyacá

== Culture ==
=== Sites of interest ===
The city hosts historical places as:

- Archaeology Museum Sogamoso, with a reconstruction of the Sun Temple
- Central park
- 6 September square
- The Pile-Mochacá, from the ancient city "the old Sogamoso"
- Morca, where the Virgin Of Morca is venerated
- Nearby Lake Tota, largest lake of Colombia and sacred site of the Muisca

=== Festivals and celebrations ===
- September 6: Anniversary of the city
- July: Festivities of the Sun and of the Steel
- Huán Festival, recreation of the indigenous ceremony of the adoration of the Sun
- September: International Festival of The Culture
- October: Festival of the corn
- October: Festival of the mud

== Radio stations of Sogamoso ==
- Rumba Stereo 106.1 FM
- Tropicana Stereo 107.3 FM
- Sun Stereo 99.1 FM
- RCN Basic Radio 1200 AM
- Caracol Radio 1090 AM
- RCN Antenna 2 1440 AM
- 96.1 FM

== Notable people ==
- Lorenzo Alcantuz, revolutionary
- Fabián Ángel, professional footballer
- Elkin Barrera, former professional cyclist
- Henry Cárdenas, former professional cyclist
- Edgar Corredor, former professional cyclist
- Camilo Gómez, professional cyclist
- Chepe González, former professional cyclist
- Luis Alfredo López, former professional cyclist
- Fabio Parra, former professional cyclist
- Humberto Parra, former professional cyclist
- Iván Parra, former professional cyclist
- Alfonso Patiño Rosselli, Colombian diplomat
- Álvaro Sierra, former professional cyclist
- Íkaro Valderrama, Latin-Siberian folk musician

== Gallery ==
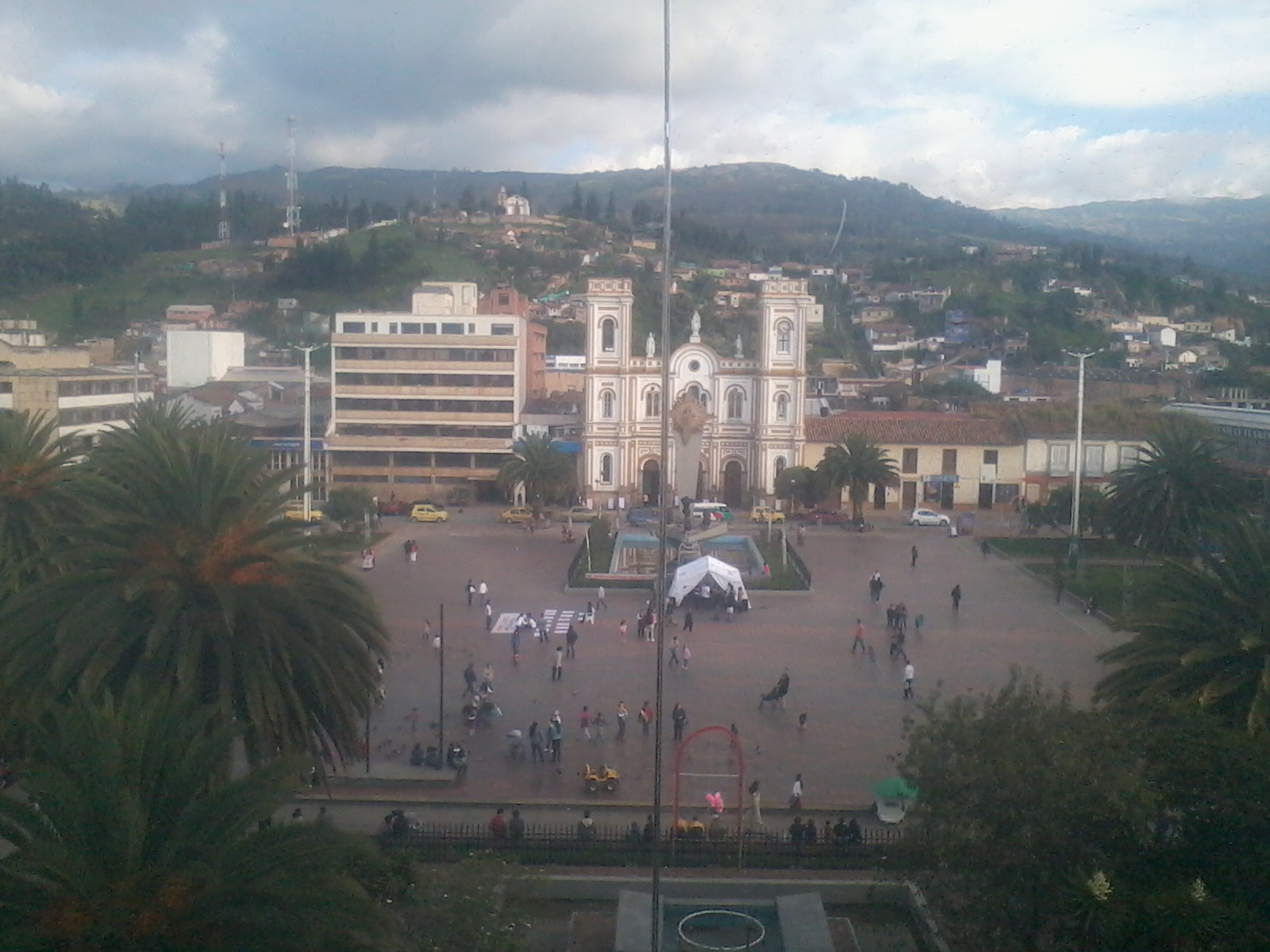
Central square

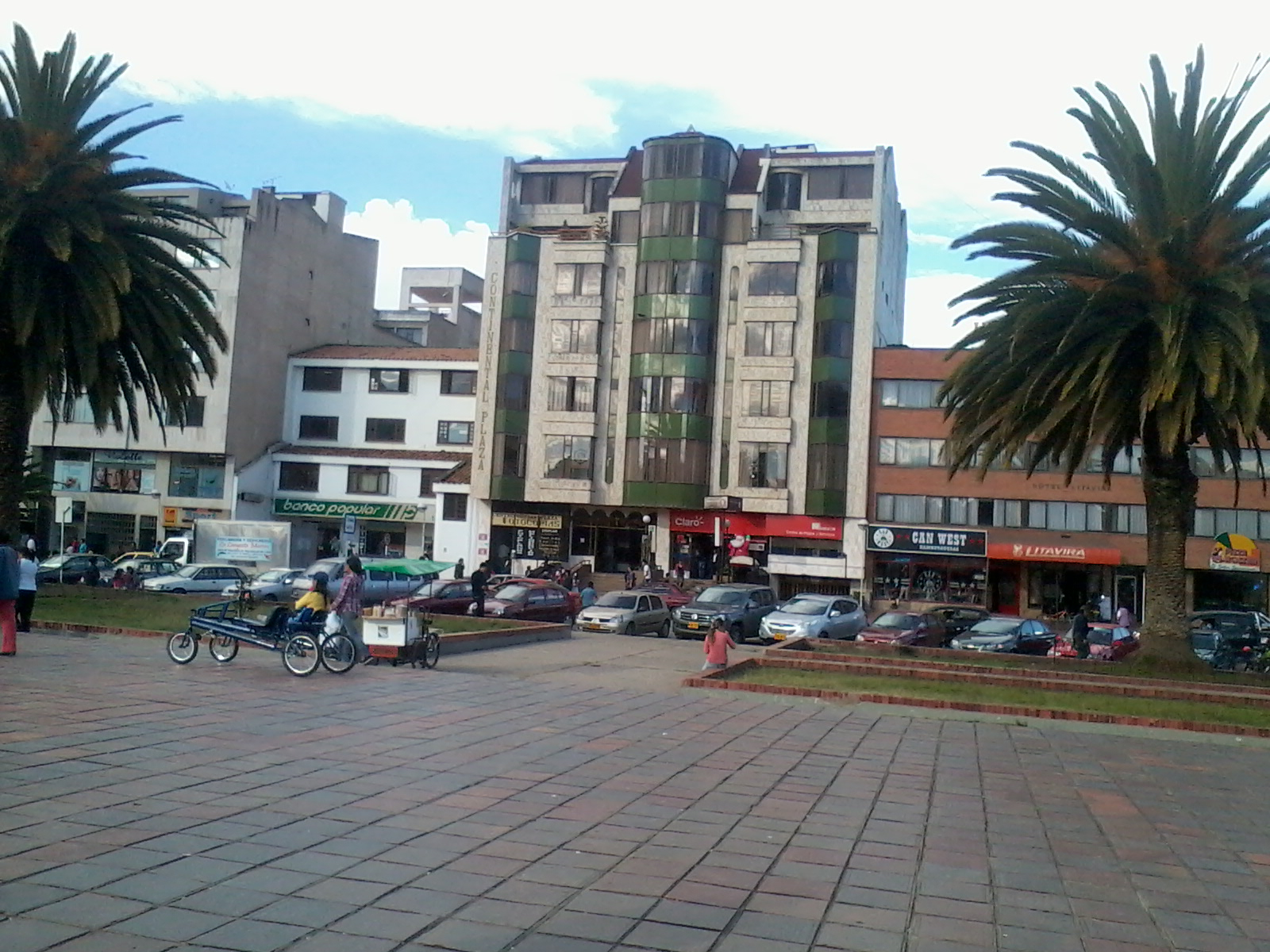
Central square

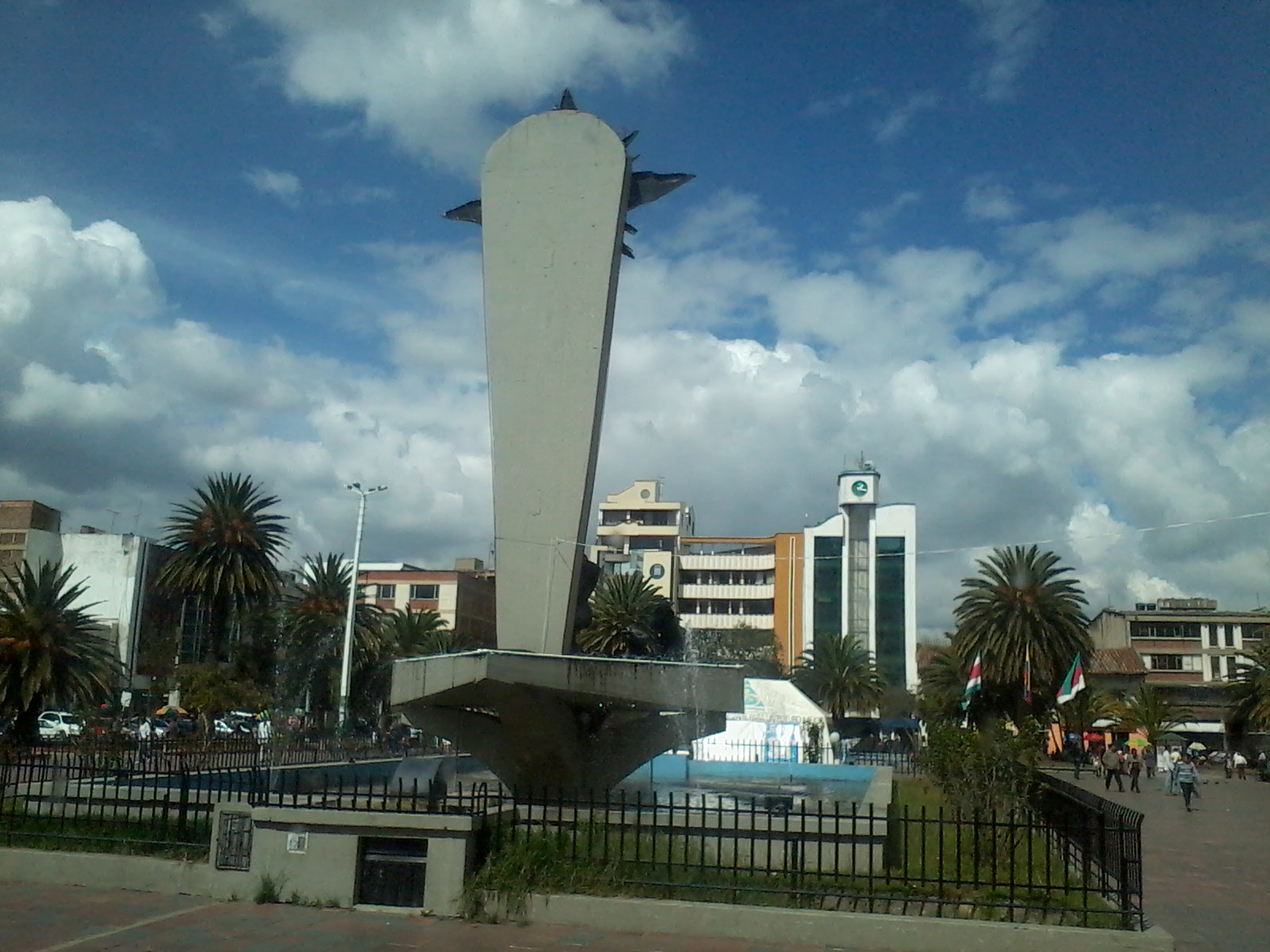
Monument to the Sun on the central square

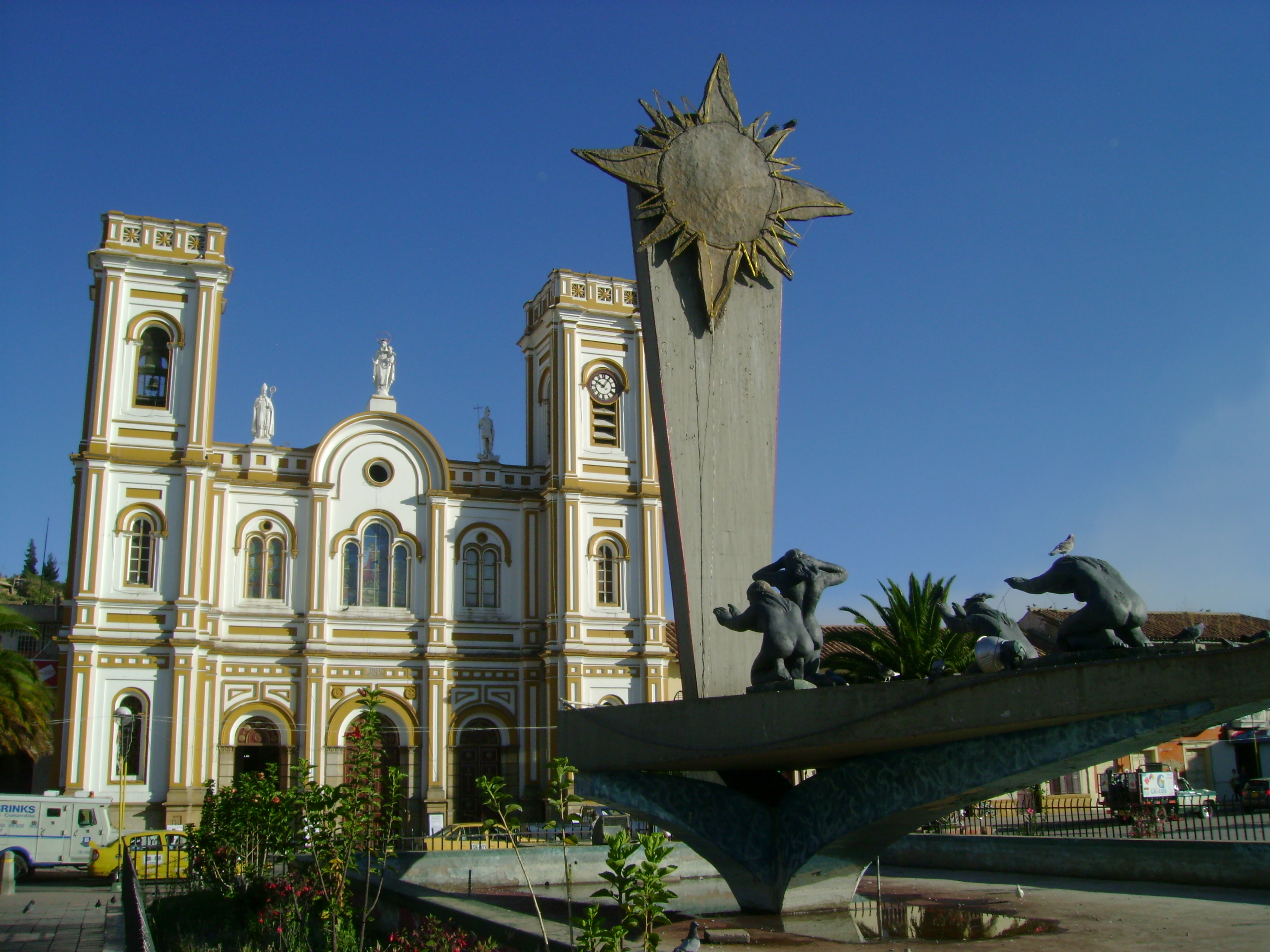
Monument to the Sun and cathedral

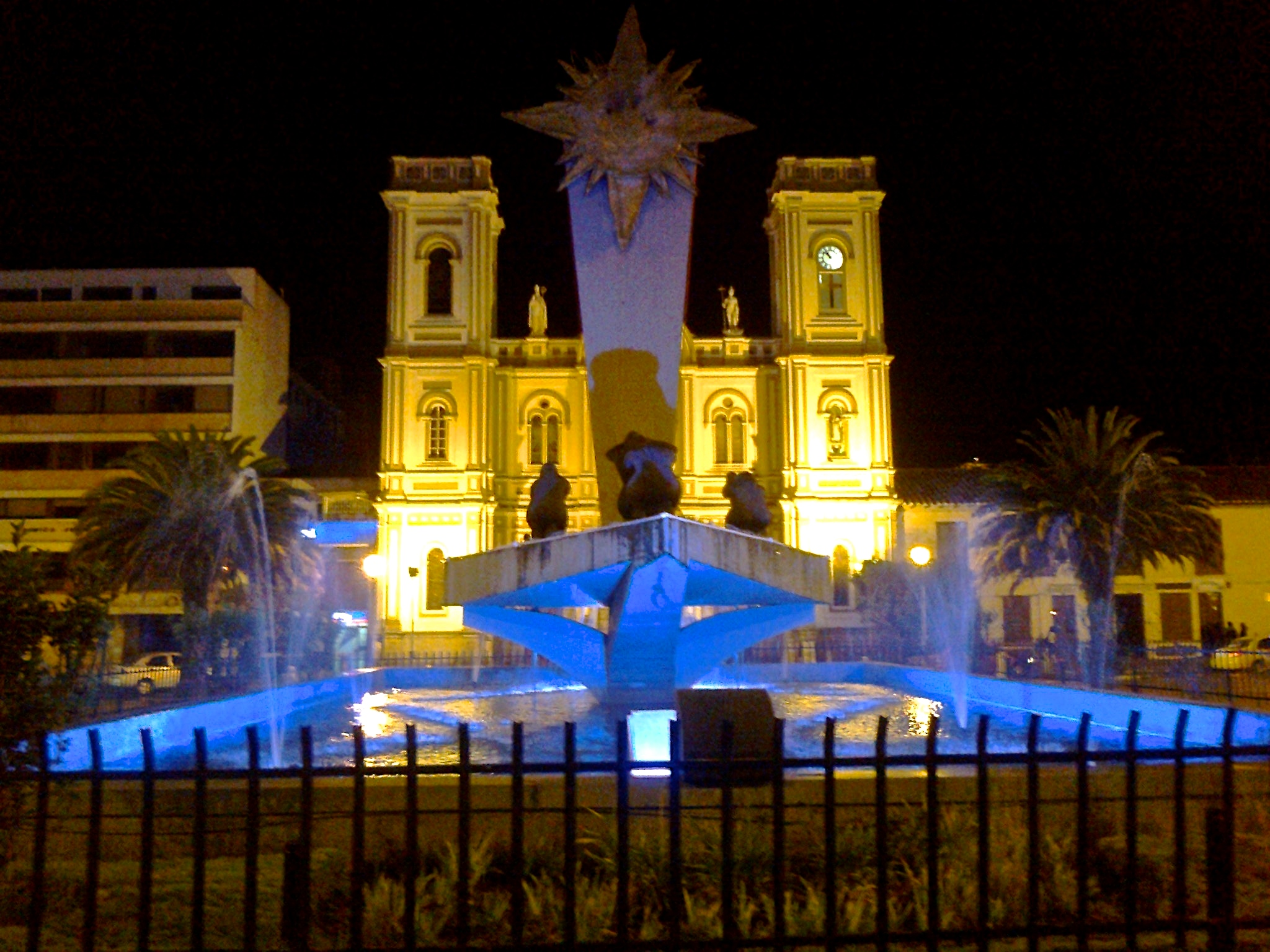
Cathedral by night
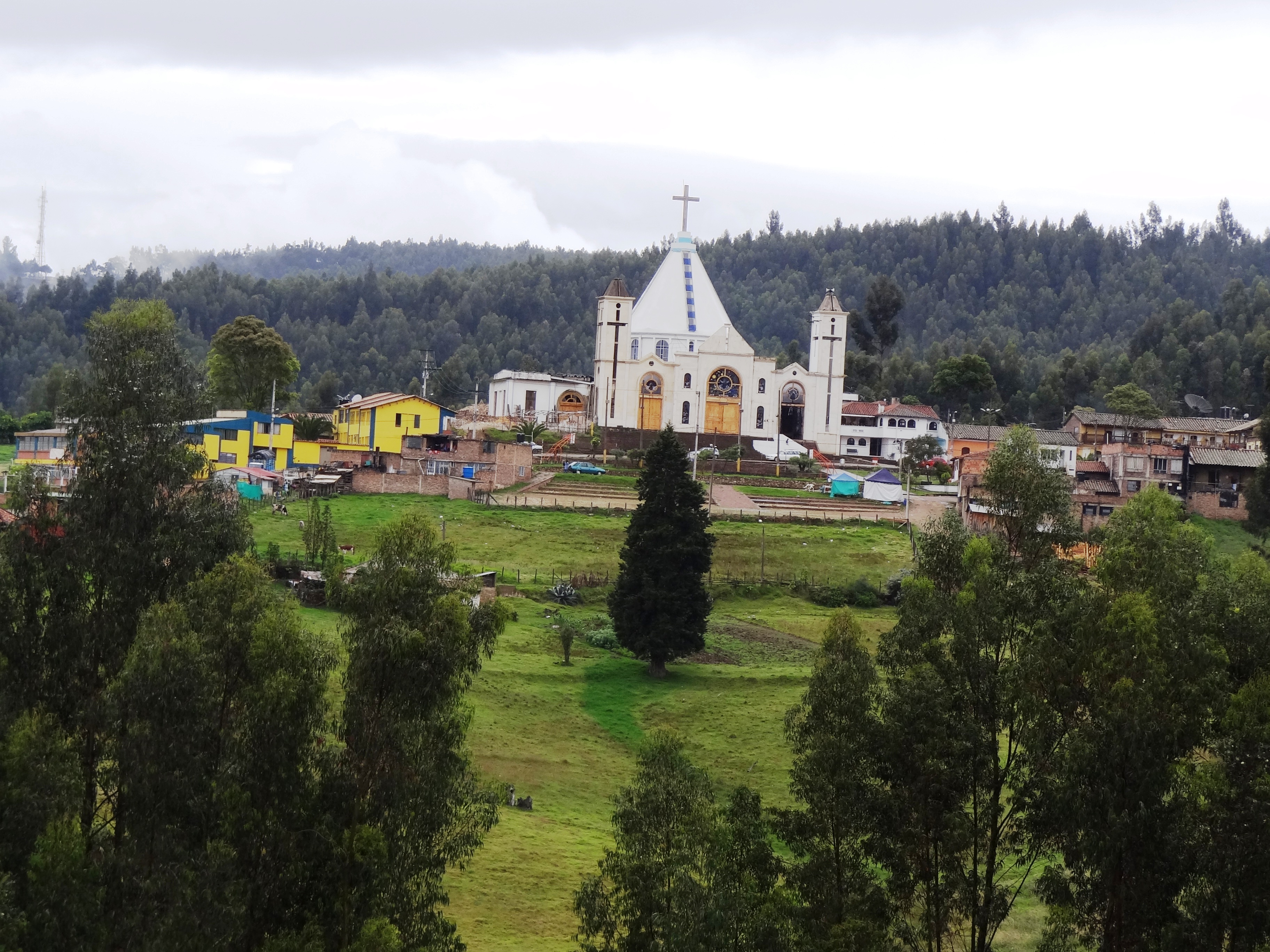
Church in the vereda Morcá

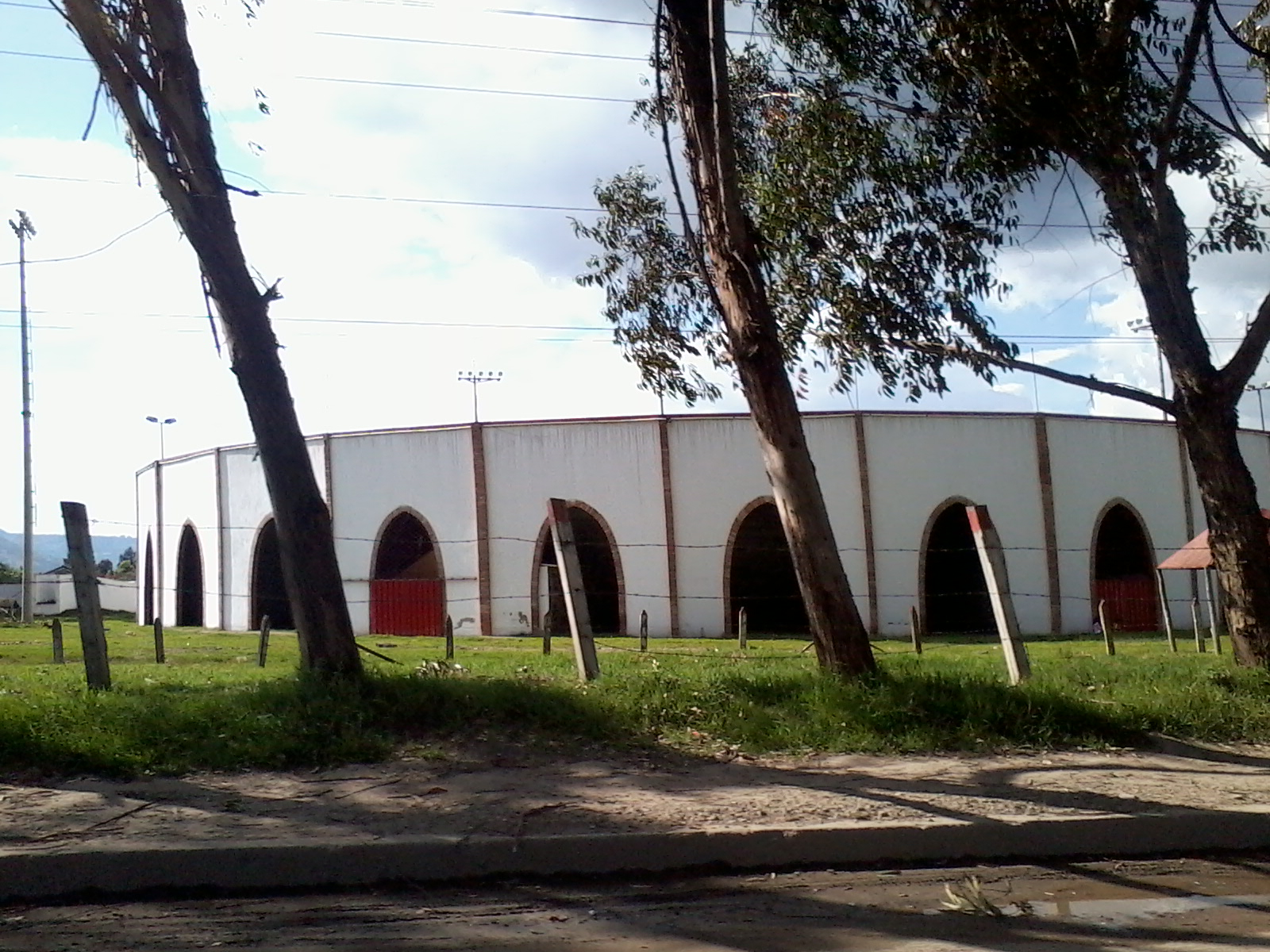
Bull fighting arena

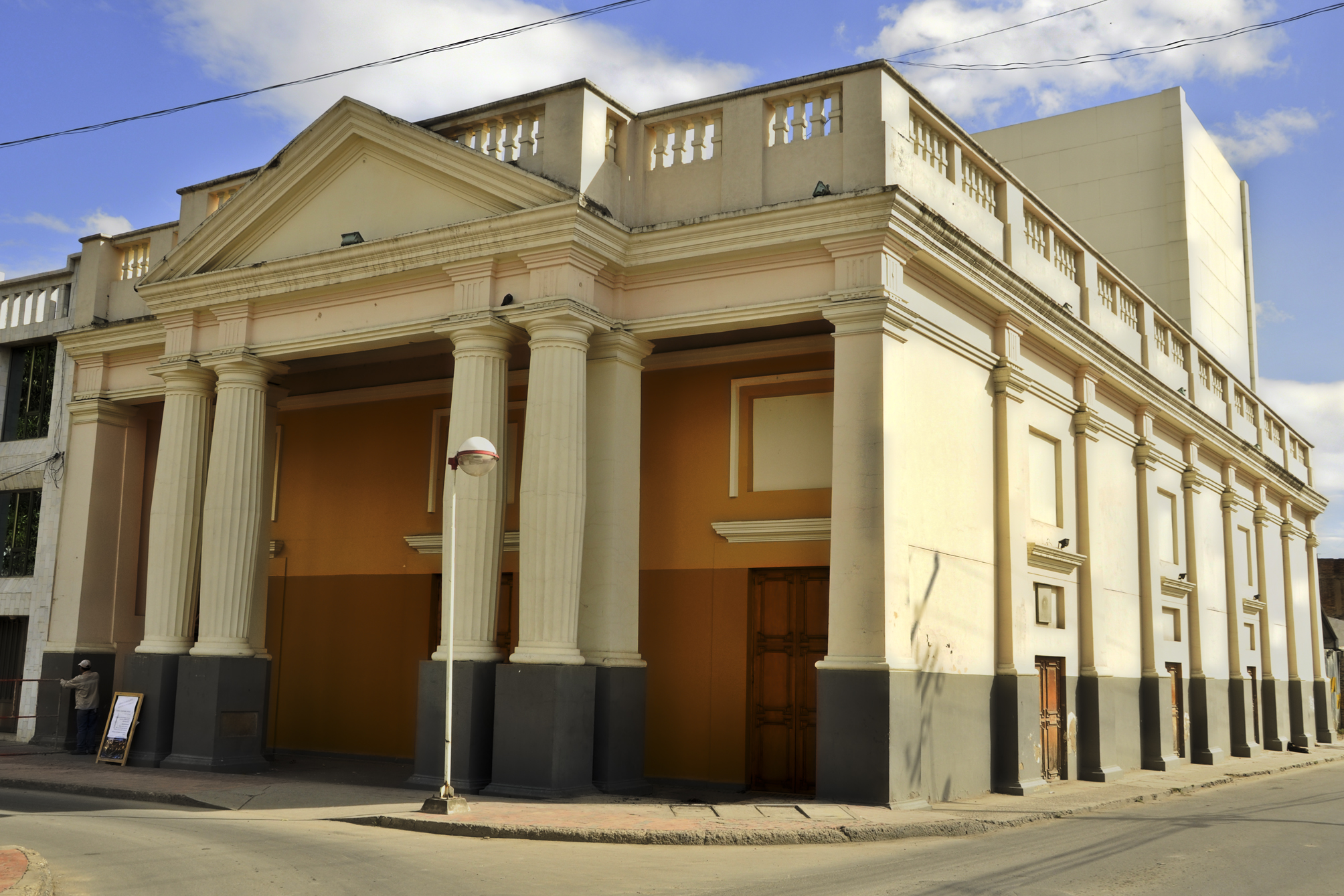
Theatre

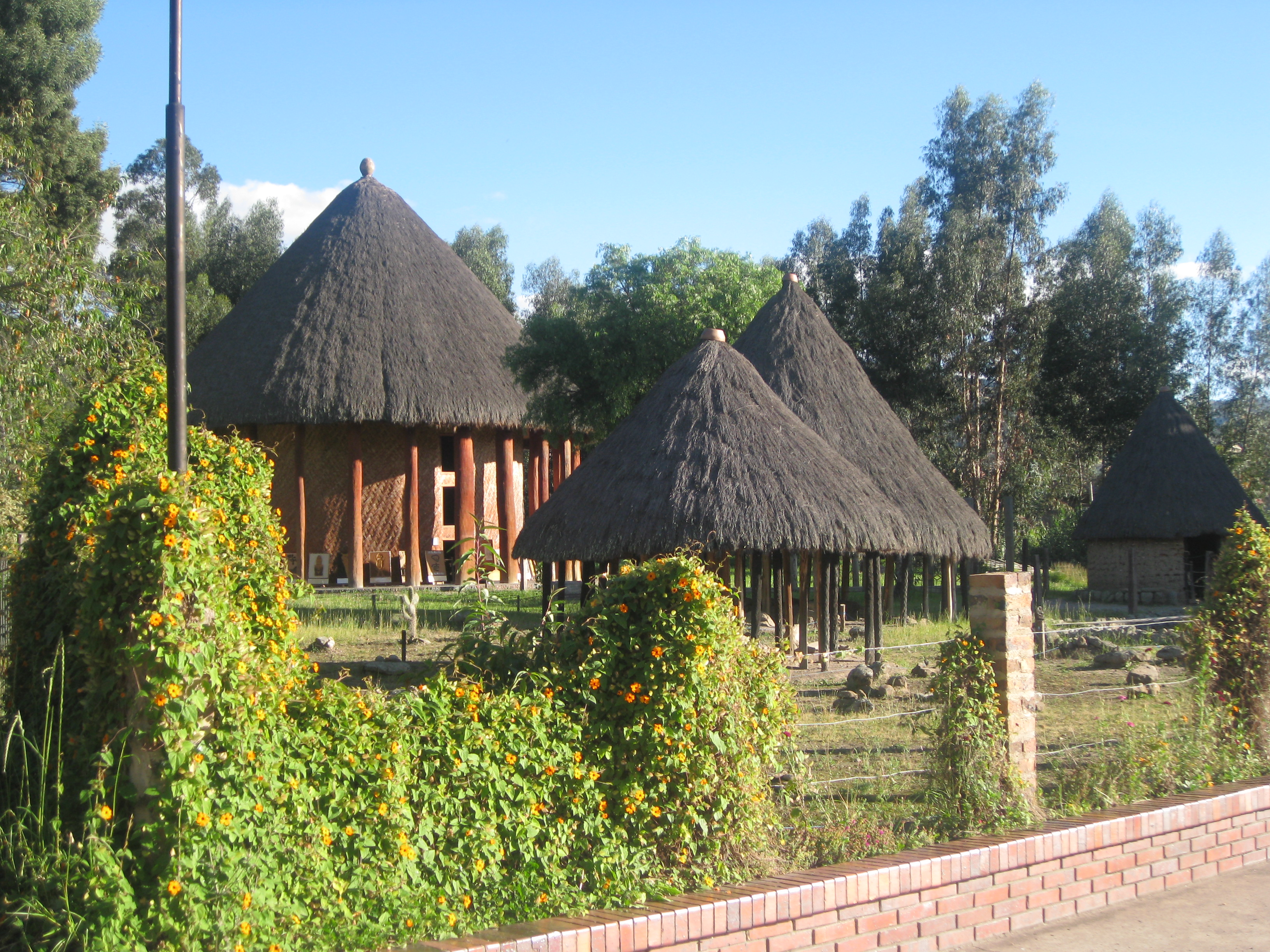
Reconstruction of Muisca houses in the Archaeology Museum

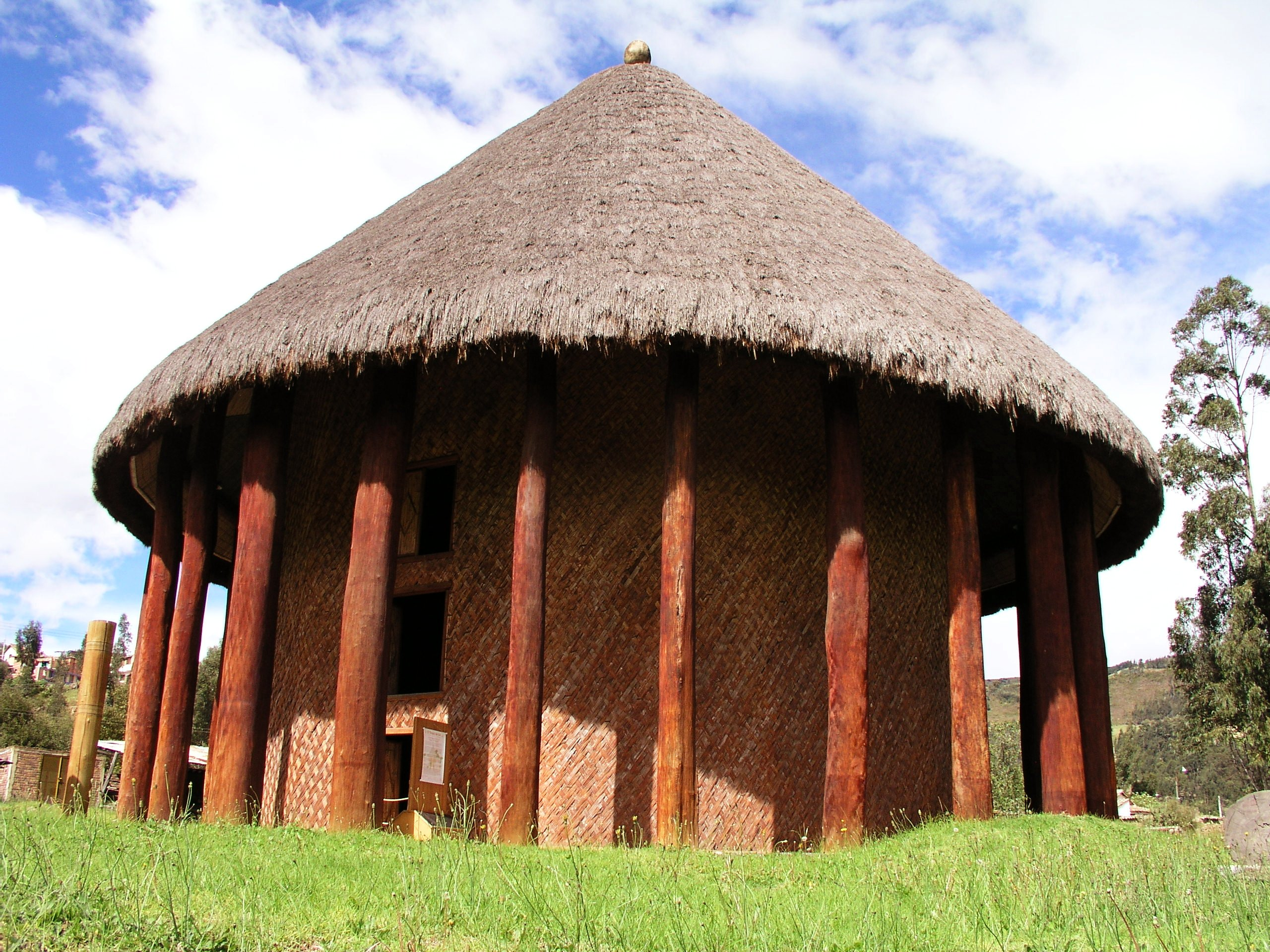
Reconstruction of the Sun Temple
