= José Robles (cyclist) =

Colombian cyclist

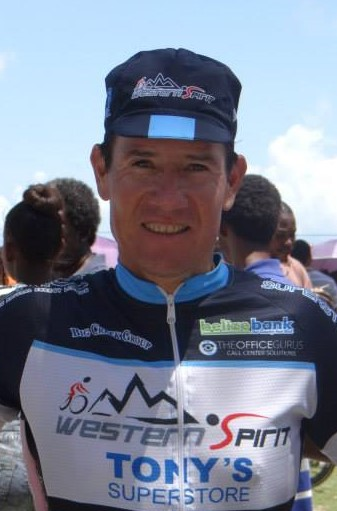

Personal information
- Full name: José Angel Florencio Robles López
- Born: 8 October 1964 (age 62) Cundinamarca, Colombia

Cycling career
- Sport: Cycling
- Disciplines: Road and track
- Role: Rider

Professional team
- 1995: Manzana-Postóbon

Major wins
- 1990 Pan American champion

José Angel Florencio Robles López (born 8 October 1964) is a retired male road racing cyclist from Colombia. He competed for his native country at the 1992 Summer Olympics, finishing in 49th place in the Men's Individual Road Race. Colombia competed with three cyclists in this event; the other ones being Héctor Palacio (52nd) and Libardo Niño (76th). He was nicknamed El Panamericano during his career.
