= Jair Bernal =

Colombian cyclist

Personal information
- Born: February 12, 1968 (age 58) Tunja, Central Boyacá Province

Cycling career
- Sport: Cycling
- Current team: Retired
- Role: Rider

Major wins
- Vuelta a El Salvador, 1989

Jair Humberto Bernal Sepúlveda (born February 12, 1968, in Tunja, Central Boyacá Province) is a retired male road cyclist from Colombia.

== Career ==
1989
1st in General Classification Vuelta a El Salvador (ESA)
1992
1st in Stage 9 Vuelta a Colombia, Bogotá (COL)
2nd in General Classification Vuelta a Guatemala (GUA)
1996
1st in Stage 6 Clásico RCN, Buga (COL)
1st in Stage 9 Clásico RCN, Santa Helena (COL)
3rd in General Classification Clásico RCN (COL)
1997
2nd in General Classification Vuelta a Colombia (COL)
