= José Castelblanco =

Colombian cyclist (born 1969)

José Joaquim Castelblanco Romero (born December 15, 1969, in Úmbita, Boyacá) is a professional track and road cyclist from Colombia. He was nicknamed "Don José" during his career.

== Major results ==
1992
1st in General Classification Vuelta a Guatemala (GUA)
1994
1st in General Classification Circuito Montañés (ESP)
1997
1st in Prologue Vuelta a Colombia, Bucaramanga (COL)
1st in Stage 8 Vuelta a Colombia, Manizales (COL)
1st in General Classification Vuelta a Colombia (COL)
1st in Colombia National Championships, Road, Elite, Colombia (COL)
1998
1st in Stage 8 Vuelta a Colombia, Manizales (COL)
1st in Stage 11 Vuelta a Colombia, Bucaramanga (COL)
1st in Stage 14 Vuelta a Colombia, Tunja (COL)
1st in General Classification Vuelta a Colombia (COL)
2001
1st in Stage 2 Clásico RCN, Manizales (COL)
1st in Stage 7 Clasico RCN, Tunja (COL)
2nd in General Classification Clasico RCN (COL)
2002
1st in Stage 5 Vuelta a Colombia, Bogota (COL)
1st in Stage 10 Vuelta a Colombia, Cali (COL)
1st in General Classification Vuelta a Colombia (COL)
2nd in Stage 6 Clásico RCN, Mosquera (COL)
1st in General Classification Clasico RCN (COL)
1st in Stage 8 Clasico RCN, Sopo (COL)
2003
1st in Stage 4 Clàsica Gobernacion de Casanare, Yopal (COL)
1st in Stage 7 Clásico RCN, Tunja (COL)
1st in General Classification Clasico RCN (COL)
2004
1st in Stage 2 Vuelta al Valle del Cauca, Palmira (COL)
2nd in General Classification Vuelta al Valle del Cauca -Col- (COL)
1st in Stage 1 Clásica de Fusagasugá, Barrio Pardo Legal (COL)
1st in Stage 3 Clásica de Fusagasugá, Fusagasuga (COL)
1st in General Classification Clásica de Fusagasugá (COL)
1st in General Classification Vuelta a Antioquia (COL)
1st in Stage 5 Vuelta a Colombia, Jericó (COL)
1st in General Classification Vuelta a Colombia (COL)
1st in Stage 2 GP Cootranspensilvania (COL)
2nd in General Classification GP Cootranspensilvania (COL)
2006
1st in Stage 4 Vuelta Internacional al Estado Trujillo, Betijoque (VEN)
1st in Stage 7 part A Vuelta Internacional al Estado Trujillo (VEN)
1st in General Classification Vuelta Internacional al Estado Trujillo (VEN)
1st in General Classification Vuelta a Colombia (COL)
2nd in General Classification Vuelta a Venezuela (VEN)
2nd in General Classification Clasico Ciclistico Banfoandes (VEN)
1st in Stage 8 Clasico Ciclistico Banfoandes, San Cristóbal (VEN)
2007
1st in General Classification Vuelta a los Santanderes (COL)
1st in Stage 4 Vuelta a Boyacà, Ramiriqui (COL)
2nd in General Classification Vuelta a Boyacà (COL)
1st in Stage 5 Clásico RCN, Pereira (COL)
2008
1st in Stage 3 Clásica Ciudad de Girardot, Guataqui (COL)
