= Santiago Amador =

Colombian cyclist (born 1964)

José Santiago Amador Abril Ospina (born 4 April 1964 in Chiquinquirá) is a retired male road racing cyclist from Colombia, who was a professional in the late 1980s and early 1990s. He was nicknamed "Pingüino" during his career.

== Career ==
1993
1st in Stage 6 Vuelta a Colombia, Medellín (COL)
