= Jorge Otálvaro =

Colombian cyclist (born 1964)

Jorge Leon Otálvaro Restrepo (born November 9, 1964, in Medellín) is a retired male road cyclist from Colombia, who was a professional from 1990 to 1997. He was nicknamed "Chacho" during his career.

== Career ==
1991
1st in Colombia National Championships, Road, Elite, Colombia (COL)
1992
2nd in Medellin (COL)
1st in Colombia National Championships, Road, Elite, Colombia (COL)
1993
1st in Stage 3 Vuelta a Colombia, El Bordo (COL)
1994
1st in Stage 2 Vuelta a Colombia, Socorro (COL)
