= Diego Garavito =

Colombian cyclist

Personal information
- Born: 30 June 1972 (age 54) Bogotá, Colombia

Cycling career
- Sport: Cycling

Diego Garavito (born 30 June 1972) is a Colombian cyclist. He competed in the men's cross-country mountain biking event at the 2000 Summer Olympics.
