= Ramón Fernando García =

Colombian cyclist (born 1972)

Ramón Fernando García (born March 15, 1972, in El Carmen, Santander) is a retired male professional road racing cyclist from Colombia.

== Career ==
1996
3rd in Stage 5 Clásico RCN, Ibagué (COL)
1999
2nd in Stage 14 Vuelta a Colombia, Zipaquirá (COL)
