= Santa Helena del Opón =

Coordinates: 6°20′N 73°36′W

- Municipality and town
- Flag

- Location of the municipality and town of Santa Helena del Opón in the Santander Department of Colombia.
- Country: Colombia
- Department: Santander Department

Area
  - Total: 387.82 km^{2} (149.74 sq mi)
- Elevation: 1,060 m (3,480 ft)
- Time zone: UTC-5 (Colombia Standard Time)

Santa Helena del Opón is a town and municipality in the Santander Department in northeastern Colombia.
