= Germán Ospina =

Colombian cyclist

Personal information
- Born: March 28, 1972 (age 54) La Unión, Valle del Cauca, Colombia

Cycling career
- Sport: Cycling
- Current team: Retired
- Discipline: Road cycling
- Role: Rider

Germán Alirio Ospina Castro (born March 28, 1972, in La Unión, Valle del Cauca) is a retired male road cyclist from Colombia, who was a professional rider from 1996 to 1997.

== Career ==
1996
1st in Stage 3 Clásico Mundo Ciclistico (COL)
1st in Stage 12 Vuelta a Colombia (COL)
1st in General Classification Clásica de El Carmen de Viboral (COL)
1997
1st in General Classification Vuelta a Antioquia (COL)
1st in General Classification Clásica a Itagüí (COL)
