= José Ibáñez (cyclist) =

Colombian cyclist

Personal information
- Nickname: El Barón Gallero
- Born: March 14, 1968 (age 58) Tunja, Boyacá

Cycling career
- Sport: Cycling
- Current team: Retired
- Role: Rider

Professional team

José Audelio Ibáñez (born March 14, 1968) is a retired racing cyclist from Colombia, who was a professional from 1997 to 1998. Born in Tunja, Boyacá, he was nicknamed "El Barón Gallero" during his career, because he was born in a Tunja's vereda called "El Barón Gallero".

== Career ==
1992
1st Stage 10 Vuelta a Colombia
2006
3rd overall, Vuelta a los Santanderes
1st Stage 5 Clásico RCN
