= Héctor Palacio =

Colombian cyclist

Personal information
- Born: 12 May 1969 (age 57) Envigado, Colombia

Cycling career
- Sport: Cycling
- Current team: Retired
- Discipline: Road
- Role: Rider

Amateur team
- 1999: 05 Orbitel

Professional teams
- 1994: Postobón–Manzana
- 1995–1996: Aguardiente Antioqueño–Lotería de Medellín
- 1997–1998: Flavia–Telecom
- 2000: 05 Orbitel

Major wins
- Vuelta a Colombia (2000)
Medal record
Representing Colombia
Pan American Games
Gold medal – first place	1991 Havana	Team time trial
Central American and Caribbean Games
Bronze medal – third place	1993 Ponce	Team time trial

Héctor Ivan Palacio Montoya (born 12 May 1969) is a Colombian former professional cyclist. During the 1992 Olympic Games, Palacio represented Colombia in the individual road race, where he finished 52nd. He most notably won the Vuelta a Colombia in 2000.

== Major results ==
1990
3rd Overall Vuelta a Costa Rica
1991
1st Team time trial, Pan American Games
1994
National Road Championships

3rd Road race
3rd Time trial

9th Overall Vuelta a Colombia

1st Stage 4

1995
6th Overall Vuelta a Colombia

1st Stage 9

1996
2nd Overall Vuelta a Colombia

1st Stages 4 & 13

1997
1st Mountains classification, Volta a Catalunya
1st Overall Vuelta al Valle del Cauca
2nd Overall Clásico RCN

1st Stage 4

3rd Overall Vuelta a Colombia

1st Stage 1

1998
7th Overall Vuelta a Colombia

1st Stage 12

1999
1st Stage 6 Vuelta a Colombia
2000
1st Overall Vuelta a Colombia

1st Stage 5

1st Stage 2 Clásico RCN
