= 2024 Tour Colombia =

2024 UCI America Tour

Race details
- Dates: 6–11 February 2024
- Stages: 6
- Distance: 925.1 km (574.8 mi)
- Winning time: 21h 18' 26"

Results
Jersey awarded to the overall winner	Winner	Rodrigo Contreras (COL)	(Nu Colombia)
	Second	Richard Carapaz (ECU)	(EF Education–EasyPost)
	Third	Jonathan Klever Caicedo (ECU)	(Petrolike)
Jersey awarded to the points classification winner	Points	Richard Carapaz (ECU)	(EF Education–EasyPost)
Jersey awarded to the mountains classification winner	Mountains	Richard Carapaz (ECU)	(EF Education–EasyPost)
Jersey awarded to the young rider classification winner	Young rider	Jose Ramon Muñiz (MEX)	(Petrolike)
Jersey awarded to the sprints classification winner	Sprints	David Santiago Gomez (COL)	(Team Sistecredito)
	Team	(United States) EF Education–EasyPost	

The 2024 Tour Colombia was a road cycling stage race that took place between 6 and 11 February 2024 starting in the city of Paipa and ending in Bogotá. The race is rated as a category 2.1 event on the 2024 UCI America Tour calendar, and was the 4th edition of the Tour Colombia.

== Teams ==
Three UCI WorldTeams, two UCI ProTeams, fourteen UCI Continental teams and five national teams make up the 24 teams that participated in the race. Each team entered a full squad of six riders with the exception of EF Education–EasyPost and the Colombian national team entering five, for a total of 142 riders who started the race.

UCI WorldTeams

- Astana Qazaqstan Team
- EF Education–EasyPost
- Movistar Team

UCI ProTeams

- Bingoal WB
- Team Corratec–Vini Fantini

UCI Continental Teams

- Canel's–Java
- Colombia Potencia de la Vida–Strongman
- GW Erco Shimano
- Nu Colombia
- Orgullo Paisa
- Panamá es Cultura y Valores
- Petrolike
- Sidi Ali–Unlock Team
- Swift Carbon Pro Cycling Brasil
- Team Banco Guayaquil–Bianchi
- Team Medellín–EPM
- Team Saitel
- Team Sistecredito
- Universe Cycling Team

National teams

- Colombia
- Brazil
- Ecuador
- Estonia
- Venezuela

== Route ==
Stage characteristics and winners
Stage	Date	Course	Distance	Type	Stage winner
1	6 February	Paipa to Duitama	155.8 km (96.8 mi)	Flat stage	Fernando Gaviria (COL)
2	7 February	Paipa to Santa Rosa de Viterbo	168.6 km (104.8 mi)	Hilly stage	Harold Tejada (COL)
3	8 February	Tunja to Tunja	141.9 km (88.2 mi)	Flat stage	Alejandro Osorio (COL)
4	9 February	Paipa to Zipaquirá	181.8 km (113.0 mi)	Hilly stage	Mark Cavendish (GBR)
5	10 February	Cota to Alto del Vino	138.3 km (85.9 mi)	Mountain stage	Richard Carapaz (ECU)
6	11 February	Sopó to Bogotá	138.7 km (86.2 mi)	Hilly stage	Jhonatan Restrepo (COL)
Total			654.415 km (406.635 mi)		

== Stages ==
=== Stage 1 ===
6 February 2024 – Paipa to Duitama, 155.8 km (96.8 mi)

Stage 1 Result (1–10)
Rank	Rider	Team	Time
1	Fernando Gaviria (COL)	Movistar Team	3h 11' 39"
2	Davide Persico (ITA)	Bingoal WB	+ 0"
3	Mark Cavendish (GBR)	Astana Qazaqstan Team	+ 0"
4	Nelson Soto (COL)	Petrolike	+ 0"
5	Jhonatan Restrepo (COL)	Colombia	+ 0"
6	Juan Diego Hoyos (COL)	Team Sistecredito	+ 0"
7	Andrea Piccolo (ITA)	EF Education–EasyPost	+ 0"
8	Niccolò Bonifazio (ITA)	Team Corratec–Vini Fantini	+ 0"
9	Christofer Jurado (PAN)	Panamá es Cultura y Valores	+ 0"
10	Franklin Archibold (PAN)	Panamá es Cultura y Valores	+ 0"

General classification after Stage 1 (1–10)
Rank	Rider	Team	Time
1	Fernando Gaviria (COL)	Movistar Team	3h 11' 29"
2	Davide Persico (ITA)	Bingoal WB	+ 4"
3	Santiago Gomez Marin (COL)	Team Sistecredito	+ 4"
4	Lauro Chaman (BRA)	Swift Carbon Pro Cycling Brasil	+ 4"
5	Mark Cavendish (GBR)	Astana Qazaqstan Team	+ 6"
6	Brayan Sánchez (COL)	Team Medellín–EPM	+ 7"
7	Cristian Camilo Muñoz (COL)	Nu Colombia	+ 8"
8	Diego Ochoa (COL)	Team Saitel	+ 9"
9	Nelson Soto (COL)	Petrolike	+ 10"
10	Jhonatan Restrepo (COL)	Colombia	+ 10"

=== Stage 2 ===
7 February 2024 – Paipa to Santa Rosa de Viterbo, 168.6 km (104.8 mi)

Stage 2 Result (1–10)
Rank	Rider	Team	Time
1	Harold Tejada (COL)	Astana Qazaqstan Team	3h 02' 07"
2	Andrea Piccolo (ITA)	EF Education–EasyPost	+ 0"
3	Óscar Sevilla (ESP)	Team Medellín–EPM	+ 0"
4	Rodrigo Contreras (COL)	Nu Colombia	+ 0"
5	Edgar Pinzón (COL)	GW Erco Shimano	+ 0"
6	Robinson Chalapud (COL)	Team Banco Guayaquil–Bianchi	+ 0"
7	Yeison Reyes (COL)	Team Sistecredito	+ 0"
8	César David Guavita (COL)	Colombia Potencia de la Vida–Strongman	+ 0"
9	Harold Martín López (ECU)	Astana Qazaqstan Team	+ 23"
10	Brandon Rivera (COL)	Colombia	+ 23"

General classification after Stage 2 (1–10)
Rank	Rider	Team	Time
1	Harold Tejada (COL)	Astana Qazaqstan Team	7h 13' 35"
2	Óscar Sevilla (ESP)	Team Medellín–EPM	+ 1"
3	Andrea Piccolo (ITA)	EF Education–EasyPost	+ 5"
4	Rodrigo Contreras (COL)	Nu Colombia	+ 11"
5	César David Guavita (COL)	Colombia Potencia de la Vida–Strongman	+ 11"
6	Yeison Reyes (COL)	Team Sistecredito	+ 11"
7	Edgar Pinzón (COL)	GW Erco Shimano	+ 11"
8	Robinson Chalapud (COL)	Team Banco Guayaquil–Bianchi	+ 11"
9	Javier Jamaica (COL)	Team Medellín–EPM	+ 30"
10	Cristian Camilo Muñoz (COL)	Nu Colombia	+ 32"

=== Stage 3 ===
8 February 2024 – Tunja to Tunja, 141.9 km (88.2 mi)

Stage 3 Result (1–10)
Rank	Rider	Team	Time
1	Alejandro Osorio (COL)	GW Erco Shimano	3h 20' 18"
2	Rodrigo Contreras (COL)	Nu Colombia	+ 0"
3	Rigoberto Urán (COL)	EF Education–EasyPost	+ 1"
4	Jonathan Klever Caicedo (ECU)	Petrolike	+ 1"
5	Egan Bernal (COL)	Colombia	+ 1"
6	Iván Sosa (COL)	Movistar Team	+ 1"
7	Adrián Bustamante (COL)	GW Erco Shimano	+ 1"
8	Edgar Cadena (MEX)	Petrolike	+ 1"
9	Niccolò Bonifazio (ITA)	Team Corratec–Vini Fantini	+ 11"
10	Richard Carapaz (ECU)	EF Education–EasyPost	+ 11"

General classification after Stage 3 (1–10)
Rank	Rider	Team	Time
1	Rodrigo Contreras (COL)	Nu Colombia	10h 33' 58"
2	Harold Tejada (COL)	Astana Qazaqstan Team	+ 6"
3	Óscar Sevilla (ESP)	Team Medellín–EPM	+ 7"
4	Andrea Piccolo (ITA)	EF Education–EasyPost	+ 11"
5	César David Guavita (COL)	Colombia Potencia de la Vida–Strongman	+ 17"
6	Yeison Reyes (COL)	Team Sistecredito	+ 17"
7	Edgar Pinzón (COL)	GW Erco Shimano	+ 17"
8	Robinson Chalapud (COL)	Team Banco Guayaquil–Bianchi	+ 17"
9	Alejandro Osorio (COL)	GW Erco Shimano	+ 19"
10	Rigoberto Urán (COL)	EF Education–EasyPost	+ 26"

=== Stage 4 ===
9 February 2024 – Paipa to Zipaquirá, 181.8 km (113.0 mi)

Stage 4 Result (1–10)
Rank	Rider	Team	Time
1	Mark Cavendish (GBR)	Astana Qazaqstan Team	4h 03' 34"
2	Fernando Gaviria (COL)	Movistar Team	+ 0"
3	Nelson Soto (COL)	Petrolike	+ 0"
4	Cees Bol (NED)	Astana Qazaqstan Team	+ 0"
5	Jhonatan Restrepo (COL)	Colombia	+ 0"
6	Niccolò Bonifazio (ITA)	Team Corratec–Vini Fantini	+ 0"
7	Norman Vahtra (EST)	Estonia	+ 0"
8	Davide Persico (ITA)	Bingoal WB	+ 0"
9	Jhojan García (COL)	Colombia Potencia de la Vida–Strongman	+ 0"
10	Andrea Piccolo (ITA)	EF Education–EasyPost	+ 0"

General classification after Stage 4 (1–10)
Rank	Rider	Team	Time
1	Rodrigo Contreras (COL)	Nu Colombia	14h 37' 32"
2	Harold Tejada (COL)	Astana Qazaqstan Team	+ 4"
3	Andrea Piccolo (ITA)	EF Education–EasyPost	+ 11"
4	César David Guavita (COL)	Colombia Potencia de la Vida–Strongman	+ 17"
5	Yeison Reyes (COL)	Team Sistecredito	+ 17"
6	Edgar Pinzón (COL)	GW Erco Shimano	+ 17"
7	Robinson Chalapud (COL)	Team Banco Guayaquil–Bianchi	+ 17"
8	Alejandro Osorio (COL)	GW Erco Shimano	+ 19"
9	Rigoberto Urán (COL)	EF Education–EasyPost	+ 26"
10	Jonathan Klever Caicedo (ECU)	Petrolike	+ 30"

=== Stage 5 ===
10 February 2024 – Cota to Alto del Vino, 138.3 km (85.9 mi)

Stage 5 Result (1–10)
Rank	Rider	Team	Time
1	Richard Carapaz (ECU)	EF Education–EasyPost	3h 34' 18"
2	Jonathan Klever Caicedo (ECU)	Petrolike	+ 13"
3	Rodrigo Contreras (COL)	Nu Colombia	+ 17"
4	Egan Bernal (COL)	Colombia	+ 33"
5	Rigoberto Urán (COL)	EF Education–EasyPost	+ 35"
6	Iván Sosa (COL)	Movistar Team	+ 37"
7	Esteban Chaves (COL)	EF Education–EasyPost	+ 1' 02"
8	Daniel Méndez (COL)	Nu Colombia	+ 1' 25"
9	Harold Tejada (COL)	Astana Qazaqstan Team	+ 1' 36"
10	Jose Ramon Muñiz (MEX)	Petrolike	+ 1' 54"

General classification after Stage 5 (1–10)
Rank	Rider	Team	Time
1	Rodrigo Contreras (COL)	Nu Colombia	18h 12' 04"
2	Richard Carapaz (ECU)	EF Education–EasyPost	+ 17"
3	Jonathan Klever Caicedo (ECU)	Petrolike	+ 24"
4	Rigoberto Urán (COL)	EF Education–EasyPost	+ 48"
5	Egan Bernal (COL)	Colombia	+ 50"
6	Harold Tejada (COL)	Astana Qazaqstan Team	+ 1' 27"
7	Esteban Chaves (COL)	EF Education–EasyPost	+ 1' 29"
8	Iván Sosa (COL)	Movistar Team	+ 1' 31"
9	Daniel Méndez (COL)	Nu Colombia	+ 1' 52"
10	Jose Ramon Muñiz (MEX)	Petrolike	+ 2' 36"

=== Stage 6 ===
11 February 2024 – Sopó to Bogotá, 138.7 km (86.2 mi)

Stage 6 Result (1–10)
Rank	Rider	Team	Time
1	Jhonatan Restrepo (COL)	Colombia	3h 06' 24"
2	Richard Carapaz (ECU)	EF Education–EasyPost	+ 0"
3	Alejandro Osoiro (COL)	GW Erco Shimano	+ 0"
4	Jonathan Klever Caicedo (ECU)	Petrolike	+ 0"
5	Harold Tejada (COL)	Astana Qazaqstan Team	+ 0"
6	Harold Martín López (ECU)	Astana Qazaqstan Team	+ 0"
7	Yeison Reyes (COL)	Team Sistecredito	+ 0"
8	Rodrigo Contreras (COL)	Nu Colombia	+ 0"
9	Rigoberto Urán (COL)	EF Education–EasyPost	+ 0"
10	Daniel Méndez (COL)	Nu Colombia	+ 0"

General classification after Stage 6 (1–10)
Rank	Rider	Team	Time
1	Rodrigo Contreras (COL)	Nu Colombia	21h 18' 26"
2	Richard Carapaz (ECU)	EF Education–EasyPost	+ 6"
3	Jonathan Klever Caicedo (ECU)	Petrolike	+ 26"
4	Rigoberto Urán (COL)	EF Education–EasyPost	+ 50"
5	Egan Bernal (COL)	Colombia	+ 1' 01"
6	Harold Tejada (COL)	Astana Qazaqstan Team	+ 1' 26"
7	Iván Sosa (COL)	Movistar Team	+ 1' 33"
8	Esteban Chaves (COL)	EF Education–EasyPost	+ 1' 46"
9	Daniel Méndez (COL)	Nu Colombia	+ 1' 54"
10	Yeison Reyes (COL)	Team Sistecredito	+ 2' 52"

== Classification leadership table ==
Classification leadership by stage
Stage	Winner	General classification	Points classification	Mountains classification	Young rider classification	Sprints classification	Team classification
1	Fernando Gaviria	Fernando Gaviria	Fernando Gaviria	Not awarded	Jose Ramon Muñiz	David Santiago Gomez	Movistar Team
2	Harold Tejada	Harold Tejada	Andrea Piccolo	Yeison Reyes	Cesar David Guavita	David Santiago Gomez	Astana Qazaqstan Team
3	Alejandro Osorio	Rodrigo Contreras	Rodrigo Contreras	Yeison Reyes	Cesar David Guavita	David Santiago Gomez	GW Erco Shimano
4	Mark Cavendish	Rodrigo Contreras	Fernando Gaviria	Yeison Reyes	Cesar David Guavita	David Santiago Gomez	GW Erco Shimano
5	Richard Carapaz	Rodrigo Contreras	Rodrigo Contreras	Richard Carapaz	Jose Ramon Muñiz	David Santiago Gomez	EF Education–EasyPost
6	Jhonatan Restrepo	Rodrigo Contreras	Richard Carapaz	Richard Carapaz	Jose Ramon Muñiz	David Santiago Gomez	EF Education–EasyPost
Final		Rodrigo Contreras	Richard Carapaz	Richard Carapaz	Jose Ramon Muñiz	David Santiago Gomez	EF Education–EasyPost

== Classification standings ==
Legend
Denotes the winner of the general classification	Denotes the winner of the points classification
Denotes the winner of the mountains classification	Denotes the winner of the young rider classification
Denotes the winner of the sprints classification	

=== General classification ===
Final general classification (1–10)
Rank	Rider	Team	Time
1	Rodrigo Contreras (COL)	Nu Colombia	21h 18' 26"
2	Richard Carapaz (ECU)	EF Education–EasyPost	+ 6"
3	Jonathan Klever Caicedo (ECU)	Petrolike	+ 26"
4	Rigoberto Urán (COL)	EF Education–EasyPost	+ 50"
5	Egan Bernal (COL)	Colombia	+ 1' 01"
6	Harold Tejada (COL)	Astana Qazaqstan Team	+ 1' 26"
7	Iván Sosa (COL)	Movistar Team	+ 1' 33"
8	Esteban Chaves (COL)	EF Education–EasyPost	+ 1' 46"
9	Daniel Méndez (COL)	Nu Colombia	+ 1' 54"
10	Yeison Reyes (COL)	Team Sistecredito	+ 2' 52"

=== Points classification ===
Final points classification (1–10)
Rank	Rider	Team	Time
1	Richard Carapaz (ECU)	EF Education–EasyPost	36
2	Rodrigo Contreras (COL)	Nu Colombia	36
3	Harold Tejada (COL)	Astana Qazaqstan Team	31
4	Jhonatan Restrepo (COL)	Colombia	29
5	Jonathan Klever Caicedo (ECU)	Petrolike	28
6	Fernando Gaviria (COL)	Movistar Team	27
7	Alejandro Osorio (COL)	GW Erco Shimano	25
8	Mark Cavendish (GBR)	Astana Qazaqstan Team	25
9	David Santiago Gomez (COL)	Team Sistecredito	23
10	Rigoberto Urán (COL)	EF Education–EasyPost	20

=== Mountains classification ===
Final mountains classification (1–10)
Rank	Rider	Team	Time
1	Richard Carapaz (ECU)	EF Education–EasyPost	15
2	Jonathan Klever Caicedo (ECU)	Petrolike	13
3	Rodrigo Contreras (COL)	Nu Colombia	12
4	Egan Bernal (COL)	Colombia	8
5	Yeison Reyes (COL)	Team Sistecredito	7
6	Rigoberto Urán (COL)	EF Education–EasyPost	6
7	Daniel Méndez (COL)	Nu Colombia	5
8	Iván Sosa (COL)	Movistar Team	4
9	Danny Osorio (COL)	Orgullo Paisa	3
10	Wilson Haro (ECU)	Ecuador	3

=== Young rider classification ===
Final young rider classification (1–10)
Rank	Rider	Team	Time
1	Jose Ramon Muñiz (MEX)	Petrolike	21h 25' 22"
2	Brandon Rojas (COL)	GW Erco Shimano	+ 59"
3	Diego Pescador (COL)	GW Erco Shimano	+ 4' 48"
4	César David Guavita (COL)	Colombia Potencia de la Vida–Strongman	+ 18' 41"
5	Hugo Rodríguez (COL)	Colombia	+ 31' 11"
6	Freddy Avila (COL)	Colombia Potencia de la Vida–Strongman	+ 34' 01"
7	Cesar Pantoja (COL)	Orgullo Paisa	+ 35' 16"
8	Michiel Lambrecht (BEL)	Bingoal WB	+ 35' 30"
9	Ivan Ojeda (COL)	Colombia Potencia de la Vida–Strongman	+ 37' 41"
10	Franklin Revelo (ECU)	Team Saitel	+ 42' 06"

=== Sprints classification ===
Final sprints classification (1–10)
Rank	Rider	Team	Time
1	David Santiago Gomez (COL)	Team Sistecredito	23
2	Richard Carapaz (ECU)	EF Education–EasyPost	7
3	Bernardo Suaza (COL)	Petrolike	7
4	Alexey Lutsenko (KAZ)	Astana Qazaqstan Team	6
5	Lauro Chaman (BRA)	Swift Carbon Pro Cycling Brasil	6
6	Harold Tejada (COL)	Astana Qazaqstan Team	6
7	Javier Jamaica (COL)	Team Medellín–EPM	4
8	Wilson Haro (ECU)	Ecuador	4
9	Rait Ärm (EST)	Estonia	4
10	Brandon Rojas (COL)	GW Erco Shimano	3

=== Teams classification ===
Final team classification (1–10)
Rank	Team	Time
1	(United States) EF Education–EasyPost	63h 58' 04"
2	Nu Colombia	+ 4' 53"
3	Colombia	+ 14' 16"
4	(Mexico) Petrolike	+ 15' 58"
5	(Kazakhstan) Astana Qazaqstan Team	+ 16' 59"
6	(Colombia) Team Sistecredito	+ 20' 08"
7	(Colombia) GW Erco Shimano	+ 21' 19"
8	(Spain) Movistar Team	+ 22' 48"
9	(Colombia) Team Medellín–EPM	+ 47' 46"
10	Colombia Potencia de la Vida–Strongman	+ 1h 04' 06"
