= 2024 EF Education–EasyPost season =

EF Education–EasyPost
- 2024 season
- UCI code: EFE
- Status: UCI WorldTeam
- Manager: Jonathan Vaughters (USA)
- Main sponsor(s): EF Education First
- Based: United States
- Bicycles: Cannondale
- Groupset: Shimano

Season victories
- One-day races: 4
- Stage race overall: 3
- Stage race stages: 12
- National Championships: 5
- Most wins: (Italy) Alberto Bettiol (Ecuador) Richard Carapaz (Netherlands) Marijn van den Berg (4 wins each)

The 2024 season for the EF Education–EasyPost team is the team's 21st season in existence and the 16th consecutive season as a UCI WorldTeam.

== Team roster ==
As of January 7, 2024.

Rider	Date of birth
Andrey Amador (CRC)	August 29, 1986 (aged 37)
Markel Beloki (ESP)	July 27, 2005 (aged 18)
Alberto Bettiol (ITA)	October 29, 1993 (aged 30)
Stefan Bissegger (SUI)	September 13, 1998 (aged 25)
Richard Carapaz (ECU)	May 29, 1993 (aged 30)
Simon Carr (GBR)	August 29, 1998 (aged 25)
Hugh Carthy (GBR)	July 9, 1994 (aged 29)
Jefferson Alexander Cepeda (ECU)	June 16, 1998 (aged 25)
Esteban Chaves (COL)	January 17, 1990 (aged 33)
Rui Costa (POR)	October 5, 1986 (aged 37)
Stefan de Bod (RSA)	November 17, 1996 (aged 27)
Owain Doull (GBR)	May 2, 1993 (aged 30)
Ben Healy (IRL)	September 11, 2000 (aged 23)
Mikkel Frølich Honoré (DEN)	January 29, 1997 (aged 26)
Lachlan Morton (AUS)	January 2, 1992 (aged 31)
Lukas Nerurkar (GBR)	November 14, 2003 (aged 20)

Rider	Date of birth
Andrea Piccolo (ITA)	March 23, 2001 (aged 22)
Neilson Powless (USA)	September 3, 1996 (aged 27)
Sean Quinn (USA)	May 10, 2000 (aged 23)
Darren Rafferty (IRL)	July 1, 2003 (aged 20)
Jack Rootkin-Gray (GBR)	November 5, 2002 (aged 21)
Jonas Rutsch (GER)	January 24, 1998 (aged 25)
Archie Ryan (IRL)	November 16, 2001 (aged 22)
James Shaw (GBR)	June 13, 1996 (aged 27)
Georg Steinhauser (GER)	October 21, 2001 (aged 22)
Harry Sweeny (AUS)	July 9, 1998 (aged 25)
Yuhi Todome (JPN)	June 18, 2002 (aged 21)
Rigoberto Urán (COL)	January 26, 1987 (aged 36)
Michael Valgren (DEN)	February 7, 1992 (aged 31)
Marijn van den Berg (NED)	July 19, 1999 (aged 24)
Jardi van der Lee (NED)	August 6, 2001 (aged 22)

== Season victories ==
Date	Race	Competition	Rider	Country	Location	Ref.
24 January	Trofeo Calvià	UCI Europe Tour	Simon Carr (GBR)	Spain	Calvià	
10 February	Tour Colombia, stage 5	UCI America Tour	Richard Carapaz (COL)	Colombia	Alto del Vino	
13 March	Milano–Torino	UCI ProSeries	Alberto Bettiol (ITA)	Italy	Salassa	
21 March	Volta a Catalunya, stage 4	UCI World Tour	Marijn van den Berg (NED)	Spain	Lleida	
22 March	Settimana Internazionale di Coppi e Bartali, stage 4	UCI Europe Tour	Archie Ryan (IRL)	Italy	Brisighella	
2 April	Région Pays de la Loire Tour, stage 1	UCI Europe Tour	Marijn van den Berg (NED)	France	Saint-Jean-de-Monts	
5 April	Région Pays de la Loire Tour, stage 4	UCI Europe Tour	Marijn van den Berg (NED)	France	Le Mans	
5 April	Région Pays de la Loire Tour, overall	UCI Europe Tour	Marijn van den Berg (NED)	France		
18 April	Tour of the Alps, stage 4	UCI ProSeries	Simon Carr (GBR)	Italy	Borgo Valsugana	
27 April	Tour de Romandie, stage 4	UCI World Tour	Richard Carapaz (ECU)	Switzerland	Leysin	
22 May	Giro d'Italia, stage 17	UCI World Tour	Georg Steinhauser (GER)	Italy	Brocon Pass	
25 May	Boucles de la Mayenne, stage 2	UCI ProSeries	Alberto Bettiol (ITA)	France	Villaines-la-Juhel	
26 May	Boucles de la Mayenne, overall	UCI ProSeries	Alberto Bettiol (ITA)	France		
16 June	Tour of Slovenia, stage 5	UCI ProSeries	Ben Healy (IRE)	Slovenia	Novo Mesto	
14 July	Tour de l'Ain, stage 2	UCI Europe Tour	Jefferson Alexander Cepeda (ECU)	France	Lelex Monts-Jura	
15 July	Tour de l'Ain, overall	UCI Europe Tour	Jefferson Alexander Cepeda (ECU)	France		
17 July	Tour de France, stage 17	UCI World Tour	Richard Carapaz (ECU)	France	Superdévoluy	
10 October	Gran Piemonte	UCI ProSeries	Neilson Powless (USA)	Italy	Borgomanero	
20 October	Utsunomiya Japan Cup Road Race	UCI ProSeries	Neilson Powless (USA)	Japan	Utsunomiya	

== National, Continental, and World Champions ==
Date	Discipline	Jersey	Rider	Country	Location	Ref.
1 February	Ecuadorian National Time Trial Championships		Richard Carapaz (ECU)	Ecuador	Riobamba	
19 May	United States National Road Race Championships		Sean Quinn (USA)	United States	Charleston	
23 June	Portuguese National Road Race Championships		Rui Costa (PRT)	Portugal	Santa Maria da Feira	
23 June	Irish National Road Race Championships		Darren Rafferty (IRE)	Ireland	Athea	
23 June	Italian National Road Race Championships		Alberto Bettiol (ITA)	Italy	Sesto Fiorentino	
