= 2024 in men's road cycling =

2024 in men's road cycling is about the 2024 men's bicycle races ruled by the UCI, national federations and the 2024 UCI Men's Teams.

== National events ==
=== October ===
Races in the 2023 National Events
Race	Rating	Date	Winner	Team
(Belgium) Nationale Sluitingsprijs	1.NE	17 October 2023	Coen Vermeltfoort (NED)	VolkerWessels Cycling Team
(Italy) Gran Premio D'Autunno	1.NE/1.19	17 October 2023	Matteo Baseggio (ITA)	
(Italy) Trofeo Comune Di Ferrera Erbagnone	1.NE	17 October 2023	Gvido Kokle (LVA)	G.C. Garlaschese
(South Korea) Korean National Cycling Games ITT	1.NE	17 October 2023	Jang Kyung-gu (KOR)	
(South Korea) Korean National Cycling Games RR	1.NE	18 October 2023	Joo Dae-young (KOR)	
(Colombia) Clásica de Girardot	2.NE	19–22 October 2023	Brandon Rojas (COL)	
(Australia) Cycle Sunshine Coast	2.NE	19–22 October 2023	Alastair Christie-Johnston (AUS)	
(Argentina) Lomas de Zamora	1.NE	20 October 2023	Sergio Fredes (ARG)	
(Thailand) Tour of Chiang Mai	2.NE	20–23 October 2023	Sarawut Sirironnachai (THA)	Kaze Bicycle
(Thailand) Tour of Chiang Mai	2.NE	20–29 October 2023	Andrei Stepanov	SY-CD-CCN
(Argentina) Zarate	1.NE	21 October 2023	Tomás Agustin Suárez (ARG)	
(United Kingdom) Richard Kell Memorial Series I	1.NE	21 October 2023	James Anderson (CAN)	
(United Kingdom) Salt Ayre Autumn II	1.NE	21 October 2023	Jack Unsworth (GBR)	
(Japan) Kasumigaura Time Trial	1.NE	21 October 2023	Sohei Kaneko (JPN)	
(Spain) Trofeo Vicente Arquimbau	1.NE	21 October 2023	Vicent Izquierdo Soriano (ESP)	
(United States) Big Sugar Gravel	1.NE/Gravel	21 October 2023	Torbjørn Røed (NOR)	
(Uruguay) Gran Carrera de la Leche	2.NE	21–22 October 2023	Agustín Moreira (URU)	CC Cerro Largo
(Costa Rica) Rojo Racing League 2	1.NE	22 October 2023	Sebastian Brenes (CRC)	
(Costa Rica) Clásica Cañas por Siempre	1.NE	22 October 2023	Claudio Miguel Monge (CRC)	
(Japan) Kasumigaura Road Race	1.NE	22 October 2023	Tetsuo Yamamoto (JPN)	
(South Africa) Amashova National Classic	1.NE	22 October 2023	Rohan Du Plooy (RSA)	
(Spain) Trofeo Ciudad de la Union	1.NE	22 October 2023	Manuel Maestra (ESP)	
(United Arab Emirates) DAMAN Al Ain Fondo	1.NE	22 October 2023	Yasser Albloushi (UAE)	
(Argentina) Mercedes	1.NE	24 October 2023	Miguel Ángel Montes (ARG)	
(France) Gwad Avenir Tour	2.NE	25–29 October 2023	Gabin Vedel (FRA)	GSC/UVN
(Bolivia) Vuelta a Cochabamba	2.NE	25–29 October 2023	Camilo Castiblanco (COL)	Pío Rico Cycling Team
(Costa Rica) Vuelta al Norte	2.NE	26–29 October 2023	Kevin Rivera (CRC)	7C-Economy Lacoinex
(Ecuador) Vuelta de la Juventud	2.NE	26–29 October 2023	Paulo Pantoja (COL)	Team Banco Guayaquil–Ecuador
(Chinese Taipei) Taiwan KOM Challenge	1.NE	27 October 2023	Ben Dyball (AUS)	Victoire Hiroshima
(Argentina) Vuelta Cutral Co	2.NE	27–29 October 2023	Leonardo Cobarrubia (ARG)	Sindicato de Empleados Publicos de San Juan
(Argentina) Las Flores 2	1.NE	28 October 2023	Sergio Fredes (ARG)	
(Australia) Gravelista	1.NE/Gravel	28 October 2023	Connor Sens (AUS)	
(Cuba) Clásico Pipian Martinez	1.NE	28 October 2023	Yariel De León (CUB)	
(Venezuela) Maturin	1.NE	28 October 2023	Fabián Rivas (VEN)	
(Zambia) Sugar Sweet Race	1.NE	28 October 2023	Yanjanani Sakala (ZAM)	
(Brazil) Giro Dario Delai	2.NE	28–29 October 2023	João Gaspar (BRA)	Pelotao AGI CT
(Argentina) Benito Juarez	1.NE	29 October 2023	Nehuén Erripa (ARG)	Ciudad de Bragado
(Argentina) Quilmes 3	1.NE	29 October 2023	Sergio Fredes (ARG)	SAT Team
(Mexico) San Francisco del Rincón Circuito de la Feria	1.NE	29 October 2023	Orlando Garibay (MEX)	Tenis Stars
Tour de France Singapore Criterium	1.NE	29 October 2023	Jasper Philipsen (BEL)	Alpecin–Deceuninck
(Spain) Madrid Criterium	1.NE	29 October 2023	Mathieu van der Poel (NED)	Alpecin–Deceuninck
(Turkey) Turkish Cycling Cup 5	1.NE	29 October 2023	Feritcan Şamlı (TUR)	
(Japan) Yokkaichi Cycle Sport Festival	1.NE	29 October 2023	Genji Iwamura (JPN)	Hatsushiba Ritsumeikan HS
(New Zealand) Tour of Southland	2.NE	29 October – 4 November 2023	Daniel Gardner (GBR)	Pista Corsa Development

=== November ===
Races in the 2023 National Events
Race	Rating	Date	Winner	Team
(Japan) Oshima Sunset Palm Line ITT	1.NE	4 November 2023	George Matsui (JPN)	Ritsumeikan University
(Argentina) Tapalque	1.NE	4 November 2023	Nehuén Erripa (ARG)	Ciudad de Bragado
(Japan) Nagato Criterium	1.CRT	4 November 2023	Bas van Belle (NED)	WPGA Amsterdam Racing Academy
(Turkey) 15 July Martyrs Commemoration Road Races	1.NE	4 November 2023	Mehmet Kanat (TUR)	
(China) Tour of Yellow River	2.NE	4–5 November 2023	Raman Ramanau	SCOM–Taishantiyu Team
(Argentina) Apertura de San Juan	1.NE	5 November 2023	Leonardo Cobarrubia (ARG)	SEP San Juan
(Argentina) Apertura Federacion de Mendoza	1.NE	5 November 2023	Matías Javier Pérez (ARG)	Gremios por el Deporte–Cutral Co
(Mexico) Gran Clasica San Diego Cuachayotla	1.NE	5 November 2023	Juan Silva Ambriz (MEX)	Balaneras Team Zacapu
(United Arab Emirates) Daman Liwa Urban Race	1.NE	5 November 2023	Anass Aït El Abdia (MAR)	Abu Dhabi CC
(Morocco) Course régionale d’Azemmour	1.NE	5 November 2023	Driss El Alouani (MAR)	Club Omnisports Meknes
(Argentina) Homenaje Rony Martinez	1.NE	5 November 2023	Enzo Nicolás Lujan (ARG)	Gremios por el Deporte–Cutral Co
Hong Kong Criterium Series 4	1.NE	5 November 2023	Yan Chak Jacob Lee (HKG)	
(Japan) Saitama Criterium	1.CRT	5 November 2023	Tadej Pogačar (SVN)	UAE Team Emirates
(Japan) Oshima Mt. Mihara HC	1.NE	5 November 2023	George Matsui (JPN)	Ritsumeikan University
(Argentina) Salto	1.NE	5 November 2023	Valentín Correa Alegre (ARG)	Ciudad de Bragado
(South Africa) PPA One Tonner	1.NE	5 November 2023	Félix Stehli (SUI)	EF Education–EasyPost
(Argentina) Tapalque	1.NE	5 November 2023	Elbio Alborzen (ARG)	SAT Team
(Brazil) Volta do Curimatau	1.NE	5 November 2023	Kléber Ramos (BRA)	Unifunvic Pindamondangadaba
(Argentina) Zarate 2	1.NE	5 November 2023	Miguel Angel Montes (ARG)	
(Argentina) Mercedes	1.NE	5 November 2023	Valentin Calderón de la Barca (ARG)	
(Australia) Tour of Tasmania	2.NRC	8–12 November 2023	Matthew Greenwood (AUS)	Team BridgeLane
(Algeria) GP National de la Ville d'Alger	2.NE	9–11 November 2023	Oussama Mimouni (ALG)	Nadi Riadhi Dely Ibrahim
(Saudi Arabia) Riyaad CC November Race	1.NE	10 November 2023	Faisal Al Shaya (KSA)	
(Bolivia) Vuelta a Potosí	2.NE	10–12 November 2023	Wilber Rodríguez (BOL)	Team Emanuel Bike
(Japan) Gunma CSC Criterium	1.NE	11 November 2023	Hibiki Koizumi (JPN)	Meiji University
(Argentina) Lanus	1.NE	11 November 2023	Gonzalo Romero (ARG)	Condimentar La Plata
(Argentina) Olavarria–UCO	1.NE	11 November 2023	Nehuén Erripa (ARG)	Ciudad de Bragado
(Argentina) Paraná entre Rios	1.NE	11 November 2023	Roberto Ayala Betancor (ARG)	Municipalidad de Lanús
(Morocco) Championnat Régional de la ligue Tanger Tetouan El Hoceima	2.NE	11–12 November 2023	Lahcen Sabbahi (MAR)	C.C.Detroit de Tanger
(Argentina) General Rodriguez	1.NE	12 November 2023	Emiliano Trozzi (ARG)	KTM Orange Road
(Argentina) Circuito Homenaje a la Calingasta	1.NE	12 November 2023	Leonardo Cobarrubia (ARG)	SEP San Juan
(Argentina) La Paz-Mendoza	1.NE	12 November 2023	Iván Escudero (ARG)	Municipalidad de Guaymallen
(Brazil) GP Outubro Rosa	1.NE	12 November 2023	David Guimarães dos Santos (BRA)	FMD Rio do Sul-Royal Ciclo-Dalthon
(China) Shengsi Islands	1.NE	12 November 2023	Tiantian Hu (CHN)	
National Games of Colombia ITT	1.NE	12 November 2023	Walter Vargas (COL)	Team Medellín–EPM
(Denmark) The Gravel Series 1	1.NE	12 November 2023	Alexander Arnt Hansen (DEN)	Restaurant Suri–Carl Ras
(Japan) Tour de Okinawa Citizen	1.NE	12 November 2023	Ryo Inoue (JPN)	Magellan Systems Japan
(Morocco) Course régionale d’Amezmiz	1.NE	12 November 2023	Ayoub El Bouhlali (MAR)	Kawkab A.C.Marrakech
(Mexico) Campeonato Michoacan	1.NE	12 November 2023	Jhonatan Casillas (MEX)	Balbanera
(Peru) Torneo Bicileo Trujillo VII	1.NE	12 November 2023	Frank Corcuera Rivera (PER)	Trujillo-TTT
(Spain) Cronoscalada Telde	1.NE	12 November 2023	Blas Arturo Rivero (ESP)	C.D.Z2 Bike
(Spain) Trofeo Ginés García	1.NE	12 November 2023	Ismael Sanchez Adan (ESP)	33 Bike Mobel Proteam
(United States) Tour por La Paz Justa	1.NE	12 November 2023	Óscar Pachón (COL)	Nusantara Cycling Team
(Uruguay) Clásica del Centenario	1.NE	12 November 2023	Juan Martín Echeverria (URU)	Club Paysandu Lil
National Games of Colombia RR	1.NE	15 November 2023	Rodrigo Contreras (COL)	Colombia Pacto por el Deporte
(Malaysia) Jelajah Negeri Sembilan	2.NE	16–19 November 2023	Muhammad Mohd Shukri (MAS)	Buceros Cycling Team
(Venezuela) Vuelta a Trujillo	2.NE	16–19 November 2023	Fernando Briceño (VEN)	Indet Trujillo

=== March ===
Race	Date	Cat. †	Winner	Second	Third	Ref
(Spain) Clásica Ciudad del Sol	10 March 2024	1.NE	Tim Schlichenmaier (GER)	Andreas Mayr (GER)	Michael Wasserrab (GER)	
(Spain) Carrera Guad Al Xenil	17 March 2024	1.NE	Joe Shillabeer (GBR)	Eduardo Gómez Díez (ESP)	Matthew Leach (AUS)	

=== April ===
Race	Date	Cat. †	Winner	Second	Third	Ref
(Spain) Clásica Martos- Monte Lope Álvarez	13 April 2024	1.NE	Alejandro Espejo Gil (ESP)	Mario Vilches Soria (ESP)	Manuel Francisco Villarrubia Rojano (ESP)	

Race	Date	Cat. †	Winner	Second	Third	Ref
Vuelta a Venezuela	21–26 November 2023	2.NE	César Sanabria (VEN)	Clever Martínez (VEN)	Franklin Chacón (VEN)	
(Bolivia) Vuelta a Santa Cruz	24–26 November 2023	2.NE	Miguel Jerez (BOL)	Pablo Figueroa Castro (BOL)	Andrés Pimentel Miranda (BOL)	
(Argentina) Vuelta al Valle Rio Negro	29 November – 3 December 2023	2.NE	Diego Valenzuela (ARG)	Alejandro Quilci (ARG)	Franco Orocito (ARG)	
Vuelta a Nicaragua	29 November – 3 December 2023	2.NE	Bryan Salas (CRC)	Carlos Andrés Romero (COL)	Argenis Vanegas (NCA)	
(Algeria) Tour de Ghardaia	30 November – 3 December 2023	2.NE	Yacine Hamza (ALG)	Mohamed N'hari (ALG)	Azzedine Lagab (ALG)	
