= 2021 Vuelta a Asturias =

Spanish cycling race

2021 Vuelta Asturias
2021 UCI Europe Tour

Race details
- Dates: 30 April – 2 May 2021
- Stages: 3
- Distance: 510.3 km (317.1 mi)

Results
Jersey awarded to the overall winner	Winner	Nairo Quintana (COL)	(Arkéa–Samsic)
	Second	Antonio Pedrero (ESP)	(Movistar Team)
	Third	Pierre Latour (FRA)	(Total Direct Énergie)
Jersey awarded to the points classification winner	Points	Nairo Quintana (COL)	(Arkéa–Samsic)
Jersey awarded to the mountains classification winner	Mountains	José Manuel Gutiérrez (ESP)	(Gios)
	Young rider	Einer Rubio (COL)	(Movistar Team)
Jersey awarded to the sprints classification winner	Sprints	Daniel Viegas (POR)	(Eolo–Kometa)
Jersey awarded to the team classification winner	Team	Movistar Team	

The 2021 Vuelta Asturias Julio Alvarez Mendo was a road cycling stage race that took place between 30 April and 2 May 2021 in the Asturias region of northwestern Spain. It was the 63rd edition of the Vuelta Asturias and was part of the 2021 UCI Europe Tour calendar as a category 2.1 event.

== Teams ==
One UCI WorldTeam, ten UCI ProTeams, and four UCI Continental teams made up the fifteen teams that participated in the race. All but two teams fielded the maximum of seven riders: Team Novo Nordisk entered six and Team Medellín–EPM entered five. There was a total of 102 riders that started the race.

UCI WorldTeams

- Movistar Team

UCI ProTeams

- Arkéa–Samsic
- Burgos BH
- Caja Rural–Seguros RGA
- Delko
- Eolo–Kometa
- Equipo Kern Pharma
- Euskaltel–Euskadi
- Gazprom–RusVelo
- Team Novo Nordisk
- Total Direct Énergie

UCI Continental Teams

- Electro Hiper Europa
- Gios
- Louletano–Loulé Concelho
- Team Medellín–EPM

== Route ==
Stage characteristics and winners
Stage	Date	Route	Distance	Type	Winner
1	30 April	Oviedo to Pola de Lena	184.5 km (114.6 mi)	Mountain stage	Nairo Quintana (COL)
2	1 May	Candás to Cangas del Narcea	200.5 km (124.6 mi)	Mountain stage	Héctor Carretero (ESP)
3	2 May	Cangas del Narcea to Alto del Naranco	125.3 km (77.9 mi)	Mountain stage	Pierre Latour (FRA)
Total			510.3 km (317.1 mi)		

== Stages ==
=== Stage 1 ===
30 April 2021 — Oviedo to Pola de Lena, 184.5 km (114.6 mi)

Stage 1 Result
Rank	Rider	Team	Time
1	Nairo Quintana (COL)	Arkéa–Samsic	5h 03' 45"
2	Antonio Pedrero (ESP)	Movistar Team	+ 26"
3	Pierre Latour (FRA)	Total Direct Énergie	+ 27"
4	Gotzon Martín (ESP)	Euskaltel–Euskadi	+ 49"
5	Alejandro Osorio (COL)	Caja Rural–Seguros RGA	+ 49"
6	Cristian Scaroni (ITA)	Gazprom–RusVelo	+ 49"
7	Roger Adrià (ESP)	Equipo Kern Pharma	+ 49"
8	Nelson Oliveira (POR)	Movistar Team	+ 49"
9	Einer Rubio (COL)	Movistar Team	+ 49"
10	Julen Amezqueta (ESP)	Caja Rural–Seguros RGA	+ 49"

General classification after Stage 1
Rank	Rider	Team	Time
1	Nairo Quintana (COL)	Arkéa–Samsic	5h 03' 35"
2	Antonio Pedrero (ESP)	Movistar Team	+ 30"
3	Pierre Latour (FRA)	Total Direct Énergie	+ 33"
4	Gotzon Martín (ESP)	Euskaltel–Euskadi	+ 59"
5	Alejandro Osorio (COL)	Caja Rural–Seguros RGA	+ 59"
6	Cristian Scaroni (ITA)	Gazprom–RusVelo	+ 59"
7	Roger Adrià (ESP)	Equipo Kern Pharma	+ 59"
8	Nelson Oliveira (POR)	Movistar Team	+ 59"
9	Einer Rubio (COL)	Movistar Team	+ 59"
10	Julen Amezqueta (ESP)	Caja Rural–Seguros RGA	+ 59"

=== Stage 2 ===
1 May 2021 — Candás to Cangas del Narcea, 200.5 km (124.6 mi)

Stage 2 Result
Rank	Rider	Team	Time
1	Héctor Carretero (ESP)	Movistar Team	5h 30' 57"
2	Nairo Quintana (COL)	Arkéa–Samsic	+ 0"
3	Einer Rubio (COL)	Movistar Team	+ 0"
4	Roger Adrià (ESP)	Equipo Kern Pharma	+ 0"
5	José Manuel Díaz (ESP)	Delko	+ 0"
6	Antonio Pedrero (ESP)	Movistar Team	+ 0"
7	Víctor de la Parte (ESP)	Total Direct Énergie	+ 0"
8	Ilnur Zakarin (RUS)	Gazprom–RusVelo	+ 3"
9	Pierre Latour (FRA)	Total Direct Énergie	+ 37"
10	Gotzon Martín (ESP)	Euskaltel–Euskadi	+ 37"

General classification after Stage 2
Rank	Rider	Team	Time
1	Nairo Quintana (COL)	Arkéa–Samsic	10h 34' 26"
2	Antonio Pedrero (ESP)	Movistar Team	+ 36"
3	Einer Rubio (COL)	Movistar Team	+ 1' 01"
4	Roger Adrià (ESP)	Equipo Kern Pharma	+ 1' 05"
5	Víctor de la Parte (ESP)	Total Direct Énergie	+ 1' 05"
6	Ilnur Zakarin (RUS)	Gazprom–RusVelo	+ 1' 08"
7	Pierre Latour (FRA)	Total Direct Énergie	+ 1' 16"
8	Héctor Carretero (ESP)	Movistar Team	+ 1' 38"
9	Gotzon Martín (ESP)	Euskaltel–Euskadi	+ 1' 42"
10	Alejandro Osorio (COL)	Caja Rural–Seguros RGA	+ 1' 42"

=== Stage 3 ===
2 May 2021 — Cangas del Narcea to Alto del Naranco, 125.3 km (77.9 mi)

Stage 3 Result
Rank	Rider	Team	Time
1	Pierre Latour (FRA)	Total Direct Énergie	2h 59' 49"
2	Alejandro Osorio (COL)	Caja Rural–Seguros RGA	+ 2"
3	Víctor de la Parte (ESP)	Total Direct Énergie	+ 12"
4	Antonio Pedrero (ESP)	Movistar Team	+ 12"
5	Nairo Quintana (COL)	Arkéa–Samsic	+ 12"
6	Einer Rubio (COL)	Movistar Team	+ 19"
7	Lorenzo Fortunato (ITA)	Eolo–Kometa	+ 59"
8	Jhojan García (COL)	Caja Rural–Seguros RGA	+ 59"
9	Roger Adrià (ESP)	Equipo Kern Pharma	+ 59"
10	Daniel Navarro (ESP)	Burgos BH	+ 59"

General classification after Stage 3
Rank	Rider	Team	Time
1	Nairo Quintana (COL)	Arkéa–Samsic	13h 34' 27"
2	Antonio Pedrero (ESP)	Movistar Team	+ 36"
3	Pierre Latour (FRA)	Total Direct Énergie	+ 54"
4	Víctor de la Parte (ESP)	Total Direct Énergie	+ 1' 01"
5	Einer Rubio (COL)	Movistar Team	+ 1' 08"
6	Alejandro Osorio] (COL)	Caja Rural–Seguros RGA	+ 1' 26"
7	Roger Adrià (ESP)	Equipo Kern Pharma	+ 1' 52"
8	Ilnur Zakarin (RUS)	Gazprom–RusVelo	+ 2' 00"
9	Nelson Oliveira (POR)	Movistar Team	+ 2' 43"
10	Julen Amezqueta (ESP)	Caja Rural–Seguros RGA	+ 3' 03"

== Classification leadership table ==
Classification leadership by stage
Stage	Winner	General classification	Points classification	Mountains classification	Sprints classification	Young rider classification	Team classification
1	Nairo Quintana	Nairo Quintana	Nairo Quintana	José Manuel Gutiérrez	Daniel Viegas	Alejandro Osorio	Movistar Team
2	Héctor Carretero	Nairo Quintana	Nairo Quintana	José Manuel Gutiérrez	Daniel Viegas	Einer Rubio	Movistar Team
3	Pierre Latour	Nairo Quintana	Nairo Quintana	José Manuel Gutiérrez	Daniel Viegas	Einer Rubio	Movistar Team
Final		Nairo Quintana	Nairo Quintana	José Manuel Gutiérrez	Daniel Viegas	Einer Rubio	Movistar Team

== Final classification standings ==
Legend
Denotes the winner of the general classification	Denotes the winner of the sprints classification
Denotes the winner of the points classification	Denotes the winner of the team classification
Denotes the winner of the mountains classification	

=== General classification ===
Final general classification (1–10)
Rank	Rider	Team	Time
1	Nairo Quintana (COL)	Arkéa–Samsic	13h 34' 27"
2	Antonio Pedrero (ESP)	Movistar Team	+ 36"
3	Pierre Latour (FRA)	Total Direct Énergie	+ 54"
4	Víctor de la Parte (ESP)	Total Direct Énergie	+ 1' 01"
5	Einer Rubio (COL)	Movistar Team	+ 1' 08"
6	Alejandro Osorio (COL)	Caja Rural–Seguros RGA	+ 1' 26"
7	Roger Adrià (ESP)	Equipo Kern Pharma	+ 1' 52"
8	Ilnur Zakarin (RUS)	Gazprom–RusVelo	+ 2' 00"
9	Nelson Oliveira (POR)	Movistar Team	+ 2' 43"
10	Julen Amezqueta (ESP)	Caja Rural–Seguros RGA	+ 3' 03"

=== Points classification ===
Final points classification (1–10)
Rank	Rider	Team	Points
1	Nairo Quintana (COL)	Arkéa–Samsic	57
2	Pierre Latour (FRA)	Total Direct Énergie	48
3	Antonio Pedrero (ESP)	Movistar Team	44
4	Alejandro Osorio (COL)	Caja Rural–Seguros RGA	36
5	Einer Rubio (COL)	Movistar Team	33
6	Roger Adrià (ESP)	Equipo Kern Pharma	30
7	Víctor de la Parte (ESP)	Total Direct Énergie	28
8	Héctor Carretero (ESP)	Movistar Team	25
9	Ilnur Zakarin (RUS)	Gazprom–RusVelo	18
10	Nelson Oliveira (POR)	Movistar Team	15

=== Mountains classification ===
Final mountains classification (1–10)
Rank	Rider	Team	Points
1	José Manuel Gutiérrez (ESP)	Gios	19
2	Víctor de la Parte (ESP)	Total Direct Énergie	16
3	Pierre Latour (FRA)	Total Direct Énergie	15
4	Antonio Pedrero (ESP)	Movistar Team	13
5	Daniel Viegas (POR)	Eolo–Kometa	13
6	Nairo Quintana (COL)	Arkéa–Samsic	11
7	Einer Rubio (COL)	Movistar Team	11
8	Ángel Madrazo (ESP)	Burgos BH	9
9	Luis Ángel Maté (ESP)	Euskaltel–Euskadi	9
10	Alejandro Osorio (COL)	Caja Rural–Seguros RGA	8

=== Sprints classification ===
Final sprints classification (1–4)
Rank	Rider	Team	Points
1	Daniel Viegas (POR)	Eolo–Kometa	12
2	José Manuel Gutiérrez (ESP)	Gios	4
3	Mathieu Burgaudeau (FRA)	Total Direct Énergie	2
4	Kévin Ledanois (FRA)	Arkéa–Samsic	1

=== Young rider classification ===
Final young rider classification (1–10)
Rank	Rider	Team	Time
1	Einer Rubio (COL)	Movistar Team	13h 35' 35"
2	Alejandro Osorio (COL)	Caja Rural–Seguros RGA	+ 18"
3	Roger Adrià (ESP)	Equipo Kern Pharma	+ 44"
4	Lorenzo Fortunato (ITA)	Eolo–Kometa	+ 2' 04"
5	Jhojan García (COL)	Caja Rural–Seguros RGA	+ 4' 34"
6	José Félix Parra (ESP)	Equipo Kern Pharma	+ 4' 49"
7	Daniel Méndez (COL)	Equipo Kern Pharma	+ 7' 09"
8	Cristian Scaroni (ITA)	Gazprom–RusVelo	+ 7' 30"
9	Unai Cuadrado (ESP)	Euskaltel–Euskadi	+ 10' 18"
10	Jon Agirre (ESP)	Equipo Kern Pharma	+ 11' 40"

=== Team classification ===
Final team classification (1–10)
Rank	Team	Time
1	Movistar Team	40h 47' 27"
2	Caja Rural–Seguros RGA	+ 6' 11"
3	Euskaltel–Euskadi	+ 8' 54"
4	Total Direct Énergie	+ 9' 16"
5	Equipo Kern Pharma	+ 11' 50"
6	Gazprom–RusVelo	+ 11' 56"
7	Burgos BH	+ 16' 38"
8	Arkéa–Samsic	+ 19' 57"
9	Delko	+ 25' 27"
10	Team Medellín–EPM	+ 29' 12"
