= Vuelta al Valle del Cauca =

Annual cycling road race in Colombia

Race details
- Date: Varies
- Region: Valle del Cauca Department
- English name: Tour of Cauca Valley
- Discipline: Road
- Competition: National calendar
- Type: Stage race
- Organiser: Liga de Ciclismo del Valle
- Race director: Hernando Zuluaga

History
- First edition: 1954
- Editions: 47 (as of 2025)
- First winner: Reinaldo Medina (COL)
- Most wins: Giovanny Báez (COL); Óscar Sevilla (ESP); (4 wins)
- Most recent: Daniel Méndez (COL)

The Vuelta al Valle del Cauca is a road cycling stage race held annually since 1954 in the Valle del Cauca Department of Colombia. It is considered to be one of the main cycling events in Colombia.

== Winners ==
| Year | Winner | Second | Third |
|---|---|---|---|
| 1954 | (Colombia) Reinaldo Medina | (Colombia) Aureliano Gallón | (Colombia) Óscar Salinas |
| 1955 | (Colombia) Francisco Otálvaro | (Colombia) Jaime Villegas | (Colombia) Carlos Gil |
| 1956-1960 | No race |
| 1961 | (Colombia) Rubén Darío Gómez | (Colombia) Pablo Hernández | (Colombia) Olmedo Britos |
| 1962-1969 | No race |
| 1970 | (Colombia) Martín Emilio Rodríguez | (Colombia) Avelino Ortega | (Colombia) Asdrúbal Salazar |
| 1971 | No race |
| 1972 | (Colombia) Óscar González | (Colombia) Gonzalo Marín | (Colombia) Mario Arbeláez |
| 1973 | (Colombia) Luis Hernán Díaz | (Colombia) Carlos Montoya Arias | (Colombia) Edgar García |
| 1974 | (Colombia) Henry Cuevas |
| 1975 | (Colombia) Luis Carlos Manrique |
| 1976 | (Colombia) Luis Hernán Díaz |
| 1977 | (Colombia) Rodolfo Arce | (Colombia) Luis Hernán Díaz | (Colombia) Diego Bravo |
| 1978 | (Colombia) Antonio Londoño | (Colombia) Abelardo Ríos | (Colombia) Gonzalo Marín |
| 1979 | (Colombia) Luis Carlos Manrique |
| 1980 | No race |
| 1981 | (Colombia) Heriberto Urán | (Colombia) Armando Aristizábal | (Colombia) Rodolfo Arce |
| 1983 | (Colombia) Rogelio Arango |
| 1986 | (Colombia) Héctor Julio Patarroyo |
| 1987 | (Colombia) Luis Alberto González | (Colombia) Fabio Acevedo | (Colombia) Celio Roncancio |
| 1988 | (Colombia) Alberto Camargo |
| 1989 | (Colombia) Luis Alberto Herrera | (Colombia) Oliverio Rincón | (Colombia) Marcos Wilches |
| 1990 | (Colombia) William Palacio | (Colombia) Henry Cárdenas | (Colombia) Óscar de Jesús Vargas |
| 1991 | (Colombia) Luis Alberto Herrera | (Colombia) Federico Muñoz | (Colombia) Armando Moreno |
| 1992 | (Colombia) Élder Herrera |
| 1993 | (Colombia) Dubán Ramírez | (Colombia) Luciano Bonilla | (Colombia) Carlos Mario Jaramillo |
| 1994 | (Colombia) Dubán Ramírez |
| 1995 | (Colombia) Javier de Jesús Zapata |
| 1996 | (Colombia) Luis Alberto González | (Colombia) Álvaro Lozano |
| 1997 | (Colombia) Héctor Iván Palacio | (Colombia) Carlos Alberto Contreras | (Colombia) José Castelblanco |
| 1998 | (Colombia) Iván Ramiro Parra | (Colombia) Dubán Ramírez | (Colombia) Julio Bernal |
| 1999 | (Colombia) Marlon Pérez |
| 2000 | (Colombia) John Freddy García | (Colombia) Marlon Pérez | (Colombia) Luis Félipe Laverde |
| 2001 | (Colombia) Javier de Jesús Zapata | (Colombia) Marlon Pérez | (Colombia) Carlos Contreras |
| 2002 | (Colombia) Mauricio Ardila | (Colombia) Carlos Andrés Ibáñez | (Colombia) Javier Alberto González |
| 2003 | (Colombia) Hernán Dario Bonilla | (Colombia) Johnny Daniel Leal | (Colombia) Marlon Pérez |
| 2004 | (Colombia) John Freddy García | (Colombia) José Castelblanco | (Colombia) Mauricio Henao Jaramillo |
| 2005 | (Colombia) Mauricio Ardila | (Colombia) Julián Darío Atehortúa | (Colombia) Mauricio Soler |
| 2006 | (Colombia) John Freddy García | (Colombia) Edwin Parra | (Colombia) Freddy González |
| 2007 | (Colombia) Giovanni Báez | (Colombia) Freddy González | (Colombia) Diego Calderon |
| 2008 | (Colombia) Giovanni Báez | (Colombia) Sergio Luis Henao | (Colombia) Mauricio Ortega |
| 2009 | (Colombia) Giovanni Báez | (Colombia) Edwar Stiber Ortiz Caro | (Colombia) Walter Pedraza |
| 2010 | (Colombia) Mauricio Ortega | (Colombia) Nairo Quintana | (Colombia) Giovanni Báez |
| 2011 | (Colombia) Mauricio Ortega | (Colombia) Wilson Marentes | (Colombia) Carlos Quintero |
| 2012 | (Colombia) Giovanni Báez | (Colombia) Ramiro Rincón | (Colombia) Edson Calderón |
| 2013 | (Colombia) Juan Pablo Villegas | (Colombia) Iván Mauricio Casas | (Colombia) Félix Cárdenas |
| 2014 | (Spain) Óscar Sevilla | (Colombia) Carlos Mario Ramírez | (Colombia) Hernando Bohórquez |
| 2015 | (Spain) Óscar Sevilla | (Colombia) Rafael Infantino | (Colombia) Walter Vargas |
| 2016 | (Spain) Óscar Sevilla | (Colombia) Fabio Duarte | (Colombia) Miguel Ángel Rubiano |
| 2017 | (Spain) Óscar Sevilla | (Colombia) Fabio Duarte | (Colombia) Juan Pablo Rendón |
| 2018 | (Colombia) Rodrigo Contreras | (Ecuador) Jonathan Caicedo | (Colombia) Jhojan García |
| 2019 | (Colombia) Miguel Ángel Reyes | (Colombia) Jhojan García | (Colombia) Freddy Montaña |
| 2020-2021 | No race |
| 2022 | (Colombia) Rodrigo Contreras | (Colombia) Wilson Peña | (Colombia) David Santiago Gómez |
| 2023 | (Colombia) Daniel Méndez | (Colombia) Didier Chaparro | (Colombia) Santiago Ramírez |
| 2024 | No race |
| 2025 | (Colombia) Javier Jamaica | (Colombia) Jaider Muñoz | (Colombia) Rodrigo Contreras |
