= Alejandro Osorio =

Alejandro Osorio may refer to:

- Alejandro Osorio (footballer)
- Alejandro Osorio (cyclist)
