= Javier Romo =

Spanish racing cyclist

Personal information
- Full name: Javier Romo Oliver
- Born: 6 January 1999 (age 27) Villafranca de los Caballeros, Toledo, Spain
- Height: 1.84 m (6 ft 0 in)
- Weight: 70 kg (154 lb)

Cycling career
- Sport: Cycling
- Current team: Movistar Team
- Discipline: Road
- Role: Rider

Professional teams
- 2021–2023: Astana–Premier Tech
- 2024–: Movistar Team

Javier Romo Oliver (born 6 January 1999) is a Spanish cyclist and triathlete, who currently rides for UCI WorldTeam Movistar Team.

After winning the Spanish national under-23 road race in 2020, Romo signed a three-year contract with Astana–Premier Tech and joined the team in 2021.

== Major results ==
=== Triathlon ===
2017
2nd Triathlon Junior European Cup
3rd Spanish National Junior Triathlon Championships
9th World Triathlon Grand Final
2018
4th Spanish National Triathlon Championships
10th European Under-23 Triathlon Championships
2019
3rd Sprint Triathlon African Cup
8th Sprint Triathlon European Cup
9th Spanish National Sprint Triathlon Championships

=== Road cycling ===
2020
1st Road race, National Under-23 Road Championships
2021
5th Overall Settimana Internazionale di Coppi e Bartali
8th Overall Tour de Hongrie
2023
7th Overall Vuelta a Burgos

1st Young rider classification

Combativity award Stage 2 Vuelta a España
2024
4th GP Industria & Artigianato di Larciano
7th Giro della Toscana
9th Overall Volta a la Comunitat Valenciana
2025 (1 pro win)
2nd Overall Tour Down Under

1st Stage 3

4th Cadel Evans Great Ocean Road Race
7th Ardèche Classic
10th Overall Tour de Romandie
Combativity award Stage 10 Vuelta a España
2026
7th Overall Tour of the Basque Country

==== Grand Tour general classification results timeline ====
Grand Tour	2023	2024	2025	2026
Giro d'Italia	—	—	—	DNF
Tour de France	—	23	—	
Vuelta a España	DNF	—	DNF	

Legend
—	Did not compete
DNF	Did not finish
