= Vuelta al Tolima =

Annual cycling road race in Colombia

Race details
- Date: Varies
- Region: Tolima Department
- English name: Tour of Tolima
- Discipline: Road
- Type: Stage race
- Organiser: Tolima Cycling League

History
- First edition: 1989
- Editions: 32 (as of 2025)
- Most wins: Rodrigo Contreras (ESP) (3 wins)
- Most recent: Javier Jamaica (COL)

History (women)
- Most recent: Diana Peñuela (COL)

The Vuelta al Tolima is a road cycling race held annually since 1989 in the Tolima Department of Colombia. Prior to 2002, the race was known as the Clásica del Tolima. Since 2015, a women's edition of the race has also been held.

== Winners ==
=== Men ===
Year	Winner	Second	Third
Clásica del Tolima
1989
1990	(Colombia) Óscar Fernando Vides	(Colombia) Joselín Peña	(Colombia) Cesar Ramírez
1991	(Colombia) Hugo Rendón	(Colombia) Gustavo Wilches	(Colombia) Jairo Giraldo
1993
1994	(Colombia) José Martín Farfán		(Colombia) José Vicente Díaz Reyes
1995	(Colombia) Henry Cárdenas	(Colombia) Augusto Triana
1996	(Colombia) Luis Espinosa	(Colombia) Fabio Hernán Rodríguez
1997	(Colombia) Henry Cárdenas	(Colombia) Israel Ochoa	(Colombia) Jairo Obando
1999	(Colombia) Jairo Hernández
2001	(Colombia) Hernán Darío Bonilla	(Colombia) Ismael Sarmiento	(Colombia) Raúl Montaña
Vuelta al Tolima
2002	(Colombia) Élder Herrera	(Colombia) Alejandro Cortés	(Colombia) Libardo Niño
2003	(Colombia) Heberth Gutiérrez	(Colombia) Juan Diego Ramírez	(Colombia) Víctor Niño
2004	(Colombia) Alexis Rojas	(Colombia) Víctor Becerra	(Colombia) Néstor Bernal
2005	(Colombia) Hernán Darío Muñoz	(Colombia) Daniel Rincón	(Colombia) Mauricio Neiza
2006	(Colombia) Jairo Hernández	(Colombia) Alejandro Serna	(Colombia) Wilson Zambrano
2007	(Colombia) Mauricio Ortega	(Colombia) Giovanni Barriga	(Colombia) Libardo Niño
2008	(Colombia) Juan Diego Ramírez	(Colombia) Iván Parra	(Colombia) Iván Casas
2009	No race
2010	(Colombia) Daniel Bernal	(Colombia) Andrés Guerrero	(Colombia) Julián Triviño
2011	(Colombia) Janier Acevedo	(Colombia) Sergio Henao	(Colombia) Álvaro Gómez
2012	(Colombia) Félix Cárdenas	(Spain) Óscar Sevilla	(Colombia) Juan Diego Ramírez
2013	(Spain) Óscar Sevilla	(Colombia) Rodolfo Torres	(Colombia) Freddy Montaña
2014	(Spain) Óscar Sevilla	(Colombia) Aristóbulo Cala	(Colombia) Rodrigo Contreras
2015	(Colombia) Alejandro Ramírez	(Colombia) Alejandro Serna	(Colombia) Luis Felipe Laverde
2016	(Bolivia) Óscar Soliz	(Colombia) Alejandro Serna	(Colombia) Alexander Gil
2017	(Colombia) Alex Cano	(Colombia) Rodrigo Contreras	(Colombia) Juan Pablo Rendón
2018	(Colombia) Rodrigo Contreras	(Colombia) Juan Pablo Suárez	(Colombia) Freddy Montaña
2019	(Colombia) Miguel Ángel Rubiano	(Colombia) Jhon Anderson Rodríguez	(Colombia) Walter Pedraza
2020	(Colombia) Aldemar Reyes	(Colombia) Didier Merchán	(Colombia) Óscar Pachón
2021	(Colombia) Yeison Rincón	(Colombia) Darwin Atapuma	(Colombia) Germán Chaves
2022	(Colombia) Wilson Peña	(Colombia) Rodrigo Contreras	(Colombia) Edison Muñoz
2023	(Colombia) Miguel Ángel López	(Colombia) Rodrigo Contreras	(Colombia) Cristian Muñoz
2024	(Colombia) Rodrigo Contreras	(Colombia) Edgar Andrés Pinzón	(Colombia) Javier Jamaica
2025	(Colombia) Javier Jamaica	(Colombia) Sebastián Castaño	(Colombia) Wilmar Paredes

=== Women ===
Year	Winner	Second	Third
2015	(Colombia) Ana Cristina Sanabria	(Colombia) Lorena Colmenares	(Colombia) Luz Adriana Tovar
2016	(Colombia) Serika Gulumá	(Ecuador) Miryam Núñez	(Colombia) Liliana Moreno
2017	No race
2018	(Colombia) Luisa Motavita	(Colombia) Jessica Parra	(Colombia) Lorena Beltrán
2019	(Colombia) Luz Adriana Tovar	(Colombia) Estefanía Herrera	(Colombia) Daniela Atehortúa
2020	(Colombia) Jennifer Ducuara	(Colombia) Andrea Alzate	(Colombia) Jessenia Meneses
2021	(Venezuela) Lilibeth Chacón	(Colombia) Erika Milena Botero	(Colombia) Lorena Colmenares
2022	(Colombia) Estefanía Herrera	(Colombia) Camila Valbuena	(Colombia) Andrea Alzate
2023	(Venezuela) Lilibeth Chacón	(Colombia) Jessenia Meneses	(Colombia) Sara Moreno
2024	(Colombia) Camila Valbuena	(Colombia) Stefanía Sánchez	(Colombia) Jennifer Ducuara
2025	(Colombia) Diana Peñuela	(Colombia) Lina Hernández	(Colombia) Gabriela López
