= Wilson Peña =

Colombian cyclist

Personal information
- Full name: Wilson Estiben Peña Molano
- Born: 7 April 1998 (age 28) Zipaquirá, Colombia

Cycling career
- Sport: Cycling
- Current team: Team Sistecredito
- Discipline: Road
- Role: Rider

Amateur teams
- 2017: Maltinti Lampadari–Banca di Cambiano
- 2021: Colombia Tierra de Atletas–GW Bicicletas
- 2023: Team Sistecredito

Professional teams
- 2018: Polartec–Kometa
- 2019: Team Beltrami TSA–Hopplà–Petroli Firenze
- 2020: Colombia Tierra de Atletas–GW Bicicletas
- 2022: Colombia Tierra de Atletas–GW Shimano
- 2024–: Team Sistecredito

Wilson Estiben Peña Molano (born 7 April 1998) is a Colombian cyclist, who currently rides for UCI Continental team Team Sistecredito.

== Major results ==
2021
1st Overall Clásica de Fusagasugá

1st Stage 1 (ITT)

2nd Overall Vuelta a Boyacá

1st Stage 3

3rd Overall Clásico RCN
2022
1st Overall Vuelta al Tolima

1st Stage 4

2nd Overall Vuelta al Valle del Cauca
4th Overall Vuelta a Colombia
2023
3rd Overall Vuelta a Colombia
4th Overall Vuelta al Tolima
5th Overall Clásica Nacional Ciudad de Anapoima

1st Stage 2

6th Overall Clásica de Fusagasugá

1st Stage 1

2024

1st Stage 5 Vuelta a Colombia
1st Prologue Tour de Guadeloupe

2025
1st Vuelta Bantrab

1st Stage 3
