= Cristian Pita =

Ecuadorian cyclist

Personal information
- Full name: Cristian David Pita Bolaños
- Born: 6 February 1995 (age 31)

Cycling career
- Sport: Cycling
- Current team: Team Banco Guayaquil–Bianchi
- Discipline: Road
- Role: Rider

Amateur team
- 2014: World Cycling Centre

Professional teams
- 2016: Team Ecuador
- 2017: Start–Vaxes Cycling Team
- 2018–2019: Team Ecuador
- 2020–2021: Best PC Ecuador
- 2022–: Team Banco Guayaquil–Ecuador
Medal record
Men's road bicycle racing
Representing Ecuador
Pan American Championships
Silver medal – second place	2021 Santo Domingo	Road race

Cristian David Pita Bolaños (born 6 February 1995) is an Ecuadorian cyclist, who currently rides for UCI Continental team Team Banco Guayaquil–Bianchi.

== Major results ==
2012
2nd Road race, National Junior Road Championships
2013
5th Time trial, Pan American Junior Road Championships
2015
5th Road race, National Road Championships
2016
1st Stage 6 Vuelta a Guatemala
2017
4th Road race, Pan American Under-23 Road Championships
2018
1st Points classification, Vuelta a Venezuela
2021
2nd Road race, Pan American Road Championships
2023
1st Points classification Vuelta a Formosa Internacional
