= 2021 Settimana Internazionale di Coppi e Bartali =

Italian cycling race

2021 UCI Europe Tour

Race details
- Dates: 23–27 March 2021
- Stages: 5, including one split stage
- Distance: 738.1 km (458.6 mi)
- Winning time: 19h 03' 47"

Results
Jersey awarded to the overall winner	Winner	Jonas Vingegaard (DEN)	(Team Jumbo–Visma)
	Second	Mikkel Frølich Honoré (DEN)	(Deceuninck–Quick-Step)
	Third	Nick Schultz (AUS)	(Team BikeExchange)
Jersey awarded to the points classification winner	Points	Jonas Vingegaard (DEN)	(Team Jumbo–Visma)
Jersey awarded to the mountains classification winner	Mountains	Alejandro Osorio (ESP)	(Caja Rural–Seguros RGA)
Jersey awarded to the youth classification winner	Youth	Ethan Hayter (GBR)	(Ineos Grenadiers)
	Team	Ineos Grenadiers	

The 2021 Settimana Internazionale di Coppi e Bartali was a road cycling stage race that took place between 23 and 27 March 2021 in the Italian region of Emilia-Romagna and in San Marino. It was the 36th edition of the Settimana Internazionale di Coppi e Bartali and was part of the 2021 UCI Europe Tour as a category 2.1 event.

== Teams ==
Nine UCI WorldTeams, seven UCI ProTeams, seven UCI Continental teams, and two national teams made up the twenty-five teams that participated in the race. All but three teams entered seven riders; Team Jumbo–Visma and Trek–Segafredo each entered six riders, while Deceuninck–Quick-Step entered only five, for a total of 171 riders. Of these riders, 88 finished.

UCI WorldTeams

- Astana–Premier Tech
- Deceuninck–Quick-Step
- Ineos Grenadiers
- Israel Start-Up Nation
- Movistar Team
- Team BikeExchange
- Team DSM
- Team Jumbo–Visma
- Trek–Segafredo

UCI ProTeams

- Androni Giocattoli–Sidermec
- Bardiani–CSF–Faizanè
- Caja Rural–Seguros RGA
- Eolo–Kometa
- Euskaltel–Euskadi
- Gazprom–RusVelo
- Vini Zabù

UCI Continental Teams

- Beltrami TSA–Tre Colli
- General Store–Fratelli Curia–Essegibi
- Giotti Victoria–Savini Due
- MG.K Vis VPM
- Team Colpack–Ballan
- Team Qhubeka
- Work Service–Marchiol–Vega

National Teams

- Italy
- Russia

== Route ==
Stage characteristics and winners
Stage	Date	Route	Distance	Type	Winner
1a	23 March	Gatteo to Gatteo	97.8 km (60.8 mi)	Flat stage	Jakub Mareczko (ITA)
1b	23 March	Gatteo to Gatteo	~~14 km (8.7 mi)~~ 10.8 km (6.7 mi)	Team time trial	Israel Start-Up Nation
2	24 March	Riccione to Sogliano al Rubicone	163.5 km (101.6 mi)	Hilly stage	Jonas Vingegaard (DEN)
3	25 March	Riccione to Riccione	145 km (90 mi)	Medium mountain stage	Ethan Hayter (GBR)
4	26 March	City of San Marino (San Marino) to City of San Marino	154.8 km (96.2 mi)	Mountain stage	Jonas Vingegaard (DEN)
5	27 March	Forlì to Forlì	166.2 km (103.3 mi)	Hilly stage	Mikkel Frølich Honoré (DEN)
Total		~~741.3 km (460.6 mi)~~ 738.1 km (458.6 mi)			

== Stages ==
=== Stage 1a ===
23 March 2021 — Gatteo to Gatteo, 97.8 km (60.8 mi)

Stage 1a Result
Rank	Rider	Team	Time
1	Jakub Mareczko (ITA)	Vini Zabù	2h 19' 08"
2	Mark Cavendish (GBR)	Deceuninck–Quick-Step	+ 0"
3	Marius Mayrhofer (GER)	Team DSM	+ 0"
4	Luca Coati (ITA)	Team Qhubeka	+ 0"
5	Ethan Hayter (GBR)	Ineos Grenadiers	+ 0"
6	Michael Zecchin (ITA)	Work Service–Marchiol–Vega	+ 0"
7	Cristian Rocchetta (ITA)	General Store–Fratelli Curia–Essegibi	+ 0"
8	Vincenzo Albanese (ITA)	Eolo–Kometa	+ 0"
9	Damiano Cima (ITA)	Gazprom–RusVelo	+ 0"
10	Mick van Dijke (NED)	Team Jumbo–Visma	+ 0"

General classification after Stage 1a
Rank	Rider	Team	Time
1	Jakub Mareczko (ITA)	Vini Zabù	2h 18' 59"
2	Mark Cavendish (GBR)	Deceuninck–Quick-Step	+ 2"
3	Marius Mayrhofer (GER)	Team DSM	+ 4"
4	Luca Coati (ITA)	Team Qhubeka	+ 6"
5	Ethan Hayter (GBR)	Ineos Grenadiers	+ 6"
6	Michael Zecchin (ITA)	Work Service–Marchiol–Vega	+ 6"
7	Cristian Rocchetta (ITA)	General Store–Fratelli Curia–Essegibi	+ 6"
8	Vincenzo Albanese (ITA)	Eolo–Kometa	+ 6"
9	Damiano Cima (ITA)	Gazprom–RusVelo	+ 6"
10	Mick van Dijke (NED)	Team Jumbo–Visma	+ 6"

=== Stage 1b ===
23 March 2021 — Gatteo to Gatteo, ~~14 km (8.7 mi)~~ 10.8 km (6.7 mi) (TTT)

Stage 1b Result
Rank	Team	Time
1	Israel Start-Up Nation	11' 36"
2	Astana–Premier Tech	+ 1"
3	Deceuninck–Quick-Step	+ 2"
4	Team BikeExchange	+ 6"
5	Ineos Grenadiers	+ 8"
6	Team Jumbo–Visma	+ 11"
7	Italy	+ 14"
8	Movistar Team	+ 21"
9	Team Qhubeka	+ 22"
10	Trek–Segafredo	+ 23"

General classification after Stage 1b
Rank	Rider	Team	Time
1	Mark Cavendish (GBR)	Deceuninck–Quick-Step	2h 30' 39"
2	Alex Dowsett (GBR)	Israel Start-Up Nation	+ 2"
3	Ben Hermans (BEL)	Israel Start-Up Nation	+ 2"
4	James Piccoli (CAN)	Israel Start-Up Nation	+ 2"
5	Guy Niv (ISR)	Israel Start-Up Nation	+ 2"
6	Alessandro De Marchi (ITA)	Israel Start-Up Nation	+ 2"
7	Sebastian Berwick (AUS)	Israel Start-Up Nation	+ 2"
8	Gleb Brussenskiy (KAZ)	Astana–Premier Tech	+ 3"
9	Javier Romo (ESP)	Astana–Premier Tech	+ 3"
10	Fabio Felline (ITA)	Astana–Premier Tech	+ 3"

=== Stage 2 ===
24 March 2021 — Riccione to Sogliano al Rubicone, 163.5 km (101.6 mi)

Stage 2 Result
Rank	Rider	Team	Time
1	Jonas Vingegaard (DEN)	Team Jumbo–Visma	4h 17' 43"
2	Iván Sosa (COL)	Ineos Grenadiers	+ 0"
3	Nick Schultz (AUS)	Team BikeExchange	+ 4"
4	Ben Hermans (BEL)	Israel Start-Up Nation	+ 4"
5	Ethan Hayter (GBR)	Ineos Grenadiers	+ 4"
6	Mauri Vansevenant (BEL)	Deceuninck–Quick-Step	+ 10"
7	Ilan Van Wilder (BEL)	Team DSM	+ 10"
8	Marco Brenner (GER)	Team DSM	+ 10"
9	Sergio Henao (COL)	Team Qhubeka	+ 10"
10	Javier Romo (ESP)	Astana–Premier Tech	+ 10"

General classification after Stage 2
Rank	Rider	Team	Time
1	Jonas Vingegaard (DEN)	Team Jumbo–Visma	6h 48' 25"
2	Iván Sosa (COL)	Ineos Grenadiers	+ 1"
3	Ben Hermans (BEL)	Israel Start-Up Nation	+ 3"
4	Nick Schultz (AUS)	Team BikeExchange	+ 5"
5	Javier Romo (ESP)	Astana–Premier Tech	+ 10"
6	Ethan Hayter (GBR)	Ineos Grenadiers	+ 11"
7	Mauri Vansevenant (BEL)	Deceuninck–Quick-Step	+ 11"
8	Mikkel Frølich Honoré (DEN)	Deceuninck–Quick-Step	+ 14"
9	Kevin Colleoni (ITA)	Team BikeExchange	+ 20"
10	Sergio Henao (COL)	Team Qhubeka	+ 31"

=== Stage 3 ===
25 March 2021 — Riccione to Riccione, 145 km (90 mi)

Stage 3 Result
Rank	Rider	Team	Time
1	Ethan Hayter (GBR)	Ineos Grenadiers	3h 49' 21"
2	Shane Archbold (NZL)	Deceuninck–Quick-Step	+ 0"
3	Nick Schultz (AUS)	Team BikeExchange	+ 0"
4	Jacopo Mosca (ITA)	Trek–Segafredo	+ 0"
5	Natnael Tesfatsion (ERI)	Androni Giocattoli–Sidermec	+ 0"
6	Orluis Aular (VEN)	Caja Rural–Seguros RGA	+ 0"
7	Vincenzo Albanese (ITA)	Eolo–Kometa	+ 0"
8	Davide Gabburo (ITA)	Bardiani–CSF–Faizanè	+ 0"
9	Cristian Scaroni (ITA)	Gazprom–RusVelo	+ 0"
10	Simone Velasco (ITA)	Gazprom–RusVelo	+ 0"

General classification after Stage 3
Rank	Rider	Team	Time
1	Jonas Vingegaard (DEN)	Team Jumbo–Visma	10h 37' 46"
2	Ethan Hayter (GBR)	Ineos Grenadiers	+ 1"
3	Iván Sosa (COL)	Ineos Grenadiers	+ 1"
4	Nick Schultz (AUS)	Team BikeExchange	+ 1"
5	Ben Hermans (BEL)	Israel Start-Up Nation	+ 3"
6	Javier Romo (ESP)	Astana–Premier Tech	+ 10"
7	Mauri Vansevenant (BEL)	Deceuninck–Quick-Step	+ 11"
8	Mikkel Frølich Honoré (DEN)	Deceuninck–Quick-Step	+ 14"
9	Kevin Colleoni (ITA)	Team BikeExchange	+ 20"
10	Sergio Henao (COL)	Team Qhubeka	+ 31"

=== Stage 4 ===
26 March 2021 — City of San Marino (San Marino) to City of San Marino, 154.8 km (96.2 mi)

Stage 4 Result
Rank	Rider	Team	Time
1	Jonas Vingegaard (DEN)	Team Jumbo–Visma	4h 26' 37"
2	Javier Romo (ESP)	Astana–Premier Tech	+ 0"
3	Nick Schultz (AUS)	Team BikeExchange	+ 0"
4	Ethan Hayter (GBR)	Ineos Grenadiers	+ 0"
5	Mauri Vansevenant (BEL)	Deceuninck–Quick-Step	+ 0"
6	Juan Ayuso (ESP)	Team Colpack–Ballan	+ 0"
7	Ben Hermans (BEL)	Israel Start-Up Nation	+ 2"
8	Natnael Tesfatsion (ERI)	Androni Giocattoli–Sidermec	+ 2"
9	Sergio Henao (COL)	Team Qhubeka	+ 2"
10	Antonio Tiberi (ITA)	Trek–Segafredo	+ 2"

General classification after Stage 4
Rank	Rider	Team	Time
1	Jonas Vingegaard (DEN)	Team Jumbo–Visma	15h 04' 13"
2	Nick Schultz (AUS)	Team BikeExchange	+ 7"
3	Ethan Hayter (GBR)	Ineos Grenadiers	+ 11"
4	Javier Romo (ESP)	Astana–Premier Tech	+ 14"
5	Ben Hermans (BEL)	Israel Start-Up Nation	+ 15"
6	Iván Sosa (COL)	Ineos Grenadiers	+ 16"
7	Mauri Vansevenant (BEL)	Deceuninck–Quick-Step	+ 21"
8	Mikkel Frølich Honoré (DEN)	Deceuninck–Quick-Step	+ 26"
9	Kevin Colleoni (ITA)	Team BikeExchange	+ 39"
10	Sergio Henao (COL)	Team Qhubeka	+ 43"

=== Stage 5 ===
27 March 2021 — Forlì to Forlì, 166.2 km (103.3 mi)

Stage 5 Result
Rank	Rider	Team	Time
1	Mikkel Frølich Honoré (DEN)	Deceuninck–Quick-Step	3h 59' 40"
2	Jonas Vingegaard (DEN)	Team Jumbo–Visma	+ 0"
3	Shane Archbold (NZL)	Deceuninck–Quick-Step	+ 19"
4	Ethan Hayter (GBR)	Ineos Grenadiers	+ 19"
5	Juan Ayuso (ESP)	Team Colpack–Ballan	+ 19"
6	Jonathan Lastra (ESP)	Caja Rural–Seguros RGA	+ 19"
7	Ilan Van Wilder (BEL)	Team DSM	+ 19"
8	Javier Romo (ESP)	Astana–Premier Tech	+ 19"
9	Paul Double (GBR)	MG.K Vis VPM	+ 19"
10	Ben Hermans (BEL)	Israel Start-Up Nation	+ 19"

General classification after Stage 5
Rank	Rider	Team	Time
1	Jonas Vingegaard (DEN)	Team Jumbo–Visma	19h 03' 47"
2	Mikkel Frølich Honoré (DEN)	Deceuninck–Quick-Step	+ 22"
3	Nick Schultz (AUS)	Team BikeExchange	+ 32"
4	Ethan Hayter (GBR)	Ineos Grenadiers	+ 36"
5	Javier Romo (ESP)	Astana–Premier Tech	+ 39"
6	Ben Hermans (BEL)	Israel Start-Up Nation	+ 40"
7	Mauri Vansevenant (BEL)	Deceuninck–Quick-Step	+ 46"
8	Sergio Henao (COL)	Team Qhubeka	+ 1' 08"
9	Amanuel Ghebreigzabhier (ERI)	Trek–Segafredo	+ 1' 14"
10	Ilan Van Wilder (BEL)	Team DSM	+ 1' 18"

== Classification leadership table ==
Classification leadership by stage
Stage	Winner	General classification	Points classification	Mountains classification	Young rider classification	Team classification
1a	Jakub Mareczko	Jakub Mareczko	Jakub Mareczko	Raffaele Radice	Marius Mayrhofer	Team Jumbo–Visma
1b	Israel Start-Up Nation	Mark Cavendish	Jakub Mareczko	Raffaele Radice	Sebastian Berwick	Israel Start-Up Nation
2	Jonas Vingegaard	Jonas Vingegaard	Jonas Vingegaard	Márton Dina	Javier Romo	Ineos Grenadiers
3	Ethan Hayter	Jonas Vingegaard	Ethan Hayter	Márton Dina	Ethan Hayter	Ineos Grenadiers
4	Jonas Vingegaard	Jonas Vingegaard	Ethan Hayter	Márton Dina	Ethan Hayter	Ineos Grenadiers
5	Mikkel Frølich Honoré	Jonas Vingegaard	Jonas Vingegaard	Alejandro Osorio	Ethan Hayter	Ineos Grenadiers
Final		Jonas Vingegaard	Jonas Vingegaard	Alejandro Osorio	Ethan Hayter	Ineos Grenadiers

- On stage 1b, Mark Cavendish, who was second in the points classification, wore the red-and-white jersey, because first-placed Jakub Mareczko wore the white jersey as the leader of the general classification.
- On stage 3, Jakub Mareczko, who was second in the points classification, wore the red-and-white jersey, because first-placed Jonas Vingegaard wore the white jersey as the leader of the general classification.
- On stages 4 and 5, Javier Romo, who was second in the young rider classification, wore the orange jersey, because first-placed Ethan Hayter wore the red-and-white jersey as the leader of the points classification.

== Final classification standings ==
Legend
Denotes the winner of the general classification	Denotes the winner of the mountains classification
Denotes the winner of the points classification	Denotes the winner of the young rider classification

=== General classification ===
Final general classification (1–10)
Rank	Rider	Team	Time
1	Jonas Vingegaard (DEN)	Team Jumbo–Visma	19h 03' 47"
2	Mikkel Frølich Honoré (DEN)	Deceuninck–Quick-Step	+ 22"
3	Nick Schultz (AUS)	Team BikeExchange	+ 32"
4	Ethan Hayter (GBR)	Ineos Grenadiers	+ 36"
5	Javier Romo (ESP)	Astana–Premier Tech	+ 39"
6	Ben Hermans (BEL)	Israel Start-Up Nation	+ 40"
7	Mauri Vansevenant (BEL)	Deceuninck–Quick-Step	+ 46"
8	Sergio Henao (COL)	Team Qhubeka	+ 1' 08"
9	Amanuel Ghebreigzabhier (ERI)	Trek–Segafredo	+ 1' 14"
10	Ilan Van Wilder (BEL)	Team DSM	+ 1' 18"

=== Points classification ===
Final points classification (1–10)
Rank	Rider	Team	Points
1	Jonas Vingegaard (DEN)	Team Jumbo–Visma	28
2	Ethan Hayter (GBR)	Ineos Grenadiers	28
3	Nick Schultz (AUS)	Team BikeExchange	18
4	Shane Archbold (NZL)	Deceuninck–Quick-Step	14
5	Mikkel Frølich Honoré (DEN)	Deceuninck–Quick-Step	10
6	Javier Romo (ESP)	Astana–Premier Tech	9
7	Mark Cavendish (GBR)	Deceuninck–Quick-Step	8
8	Ben Hermans (BEL)	Israel Start-Up Nation	7
9	Mauri Vansevenant (BEL)	Deceuninck–Quick-Step	7
10	Juan Ayuso (ESP)	Team Colpack–Ballan	7

=== Mountains classification ===
Final mountains classification (1–10)
Rank	Rider	Team	Points
1	Alejandro Osorio (COL)	Caja Rural–Seguros RGA	32
2	Márton Dina (HUN)	Eolo–Kometa	28
3	Antonio Nibali (ITA)	Trek–Segafredo	18
4	Edoardo Zardini (ITA)	Vini Zabù	12
5	Raffaele Radice (ITA)	MG.K Vis VPM	11
6	Einer Rubio (COL)	Movistar Team	8
7	Mikkel Frølich Honoré (DEN)	Deceuninck–Quick-Step	5
8	Ben Hermans (BEL)	Israel Start-Up Nation	5
9	Alessandro Fancellu (ITA)	Eolo–Kometa	4
10	Emil Dima (ROU)	Giotti Victoria–Savini Due	4

=== Young rider classification ===
Final young rider classification (1–10)
Rank	Rider	Team	Time
1	Ethan Hayter (GBR)	Ineos Grenadiers	19h 04' 23"
2	Javier Romo (ESP)	Astana–Premier Tech	+ 3"
3	Mauri Vansevenant (BEL)	Deceuninck–Quick-Step	+ 10"
4	Ilan Van Wilder (BEL)	Team DSM	+ 42"
5	Kevin Colleoni (ITA)	Team BikeExchange	+ 45"
6	Natnael Tesfatsion (ERI)	Androni Giocattoli–Sidermec	+ 1' 13"
7	Jefferson Alexander Cepeda (ECU)	Androni Giocattoli–Sidermec	+ 1' 13"
8	Juan Ayuso (ESP)	Team Colpack–Ballan	+ 1' 48"
9	Marco Frigo (ITA)	Italy	+ 2' 09"
10	Antonio Tiberi (ITA)	Trek–Segafredo	+ 2' 57"

=== Team classification ===
Final team classification (1–10)
Rank	Team	Time
1	Ineos Grenadiers	56h 53' 19"
2	Androni Giocattoli–Sidermec	+ 1"
3	Team DSM	+ 28"
4	Trek–Segafredo	+ 2' 30"
5	Caja Rural–Seguros RGA	+ 5' 54"
6	Israel Start-Up Nation	+ 6' 44"
7	Astana–Premier Tech	+ 8' 21"
8	Team BikeExchange	+ 11' 56"
9	Bardiani–CSF–Faizanè	+ 16' 46"
10	Deceuninck–Quick-Step	+ 21' 06"
