= 2025 Tour Down Under =

Cycling race

2025 UCI World Tour, race 1 of 36

Race details
- Dates: 21–26 January 2025
- Stages: 6
- Distance: 819.9 km (509.5 mi)
- Winning time: 19h 19' 16"

Results
Jersey awarded to the overall winner	Winner	Jhonatan Narváez (ECU)	(UAE Team Emirates XRG)
	Second	Javier Romo (ESP)	(Movistar Team)
	Third	Finn Fisher-Black (NZL)	(Red Bull–Bora–Hansgrohe)
Jersey awarded to the mountains classification winner	Mountains	Fergus Browning (AUS)	(Australia)
Jersey awarded to the young rider classification winner	Young rider	Albert Withen Philipsen (DEN)	(Lidl–Trek)
Jersey awarded to the sprints classification winner	Sprints	Sam Welsford (AUS)	(Red Bull–Bora–Hansgrohe)
	Team	(United States) Lidl–Trek	

The 2025 Tour Down Under was a road cycling stage race held between 21 and 26 January. It took place in and around Adelaide and South Australia. It was the 25th edition of the Tour Down Under and the first race of the 2025 UCI World Tour. The race was won by Ecuadorian rider Jhonatan Narváez (UAE Team Emirates XRG).

== Teams ==
All eighteen UCI WorldTeams, one UCI ProTeam, and one national team participated in the race.

UCI WorldTeams

- Alpecin–Deceuninck
- Arkéa–B&B Hotels
- Cofidis
- Decathlon–AG2R La Mondiale
- EF Education–EasyPost
- Groupama–FDJ
- INEOS Grenadiers
- Intermarché–Wanty
- Lidl–Trek
- Movistar Team
- Red Bull–Bora–Hansgrohe
- Soudal–Quick-Step
- Team Bahrain Victorious
- Team Picnic–PostNL
- Team Jayco–AlUla
- UAE Team Emirates XRG
- Visma–Lease a Bike
- XDS Astana Team

UCI ProTeams

- Israel–Premier Tech

National Teams

- Australia

== Route ==
Stage characteristics and winners
Stage	Date	Route	Distance	Type	Winner
1	21 January	Prospect to Gumeracha	150.7 km (93.6 mi)	Hilly stage	Sam Welsford (AUS)
2	22 January	Tanunda to Tanunda	128.8 km (80.0 mi)	Hilly stage	Sam Welsford (AUS)
3	23 January	Norwood to Uraidla	147.5 km (91.7 mi)	Hilly stage	Javier Romo (ESP)
4	24 January	Glenelg to Victor Harbor	157.2 km (97.7 mi)	Hilly stage	Bryan Coquard (FRA)
5	25 January	McLaren Vale to Willunga Hill	145.7 km (90.5 mi)	Hilly stage	Jhonatan Narváez (ECU)
6	26 January	Adelaide to Adelaide	90 km (56 mi)	Flat stage	Sam Welsford (AUS)
Total			824.6 km (512.4 mi)		

== Stages ==
=== Stage 1 ===
21 January 2025 — Prospect to Gumeracha, 150.7 km (94 mi)

Stage 1 Result
Rank	Rider	Team	Time
1	Sam Welsford (AUS)	Red Bull–Bora–Hansgrohe	3h 26' 38"
2	Matthew Brennan (GBR)	Visma–Lease a Bike	+ 0"
3	Matthew Walls (GBR)	Groupama–FDJ	+ 0"
4	Tim Torn Teutenberg (GER)	Lidl–Trek	+ 0"
5	Ben Swift (GBR)	INEOS Grenadiers	+ 0"
6	Simon Dehairs (BEL)	Alpecin–Deceuninck	+ 0"
7	Corbin Strong (NZL)	Israel–Premier Tech	+ 0"
8	Rui Oliveira (POR)	UAE Team Emirates XRG	+ 0"
9	Phil Bauhaus (GER)	Team Bahrain Victorious	+ 0"
10	Jacopo Mosca (ITA)	Lidl–Trek	+ 0"

General classification after Stage 1
Rank	Rider	Team	Time
1	Sam Welsford (AUS)	Red Bull–Bora–Hansgrohe	3h 26' 28"
2	Matthew Brennan (GBR)	Visma–Lease a Bike	+ 4"
3	Zac Marriage (AUS)	Australia	+ 5"
4	Matthew Walls (GBR)	Groupama–FDJ	+ 6"
5	Bastien Tronchon (FRA)	Decathlon–AG2R La Mondiale	+ 7"
6	Fergus Browning (AUS)	Australia	+ 7"
7	Jhonatan Narváez (ECU)	UAE Team Emirates XRG	+ 9"
8	Tim Torn Teutenberg (GER)	Lidl–Trek	+ 10"
9	Ben Swift (GBR)	INEOS Grenadiers	+ 10"
10	Simon Dehairs (BEL)	Alpecin–Deceuninck	+ 10"

=== Stage 2 ===
22 January 2025 — Tanunda to Tanunda, 128.8 km (80 mi)

Stage 2 Result
Rank	Rider	Team	Time
1	Sam Welsford (AUS)	Red Bull–Bora–Hansgrohe	3h 01' 22"
2	Arne Marit (BEL)	Intermarché–Wanty	+ 0"
3	Bryan Coquard (FRA)	Cofidis	+ 0"
4	Tim Torn Teutenberg (GER)	Lidl–Trek	+ 0"
5	Tobias Lund Andresen (DEN)	Team Picnic–PostNL	+ 0"
6	Henri Uhlig (GER)	Alpecin–Deceuninck	+ 0"
7	Samuel Watson (GBR)	INEOS Grenadiers	+ 0"
8	Corbin Strong (NZL)	Israel–Premier Tech	+ 0"
9	Alexis Renard (FRA)	Cofidis	+ 0"
10	Matthew Walls (GBR)	Groupama–FDJ	+ 0"

General classification after Stage 2
Rank	Rider	Team	Time
1	Sam Welsford (AUS)	Red Bull–Bora–Hansgrohe	6h 27' 40"
2	Arne Marit (BEL)	Intermarché–Wanty	+ 14"
3	Matthew Brennan (GBR)	Visma–Lease a Bike	+ 14"
4	Patrick Konrad (AUT)	Lidl–Trek	+ 15"
5	Georg Zimmermann (GER)	Intermarché–Wanty	+ 15"
6	Zac Marriage (AUS)	Australia	+ 15"
7	Fergus Browning (AUS)	Australia	+ 15"
8	Matthew Walls (GBR)	Groupama–FDJ	+ 16"
9	Bryan Coquard (FRA)	Cofidis	+ 16"
10	Bastien Tronchon (FRA)	Decathlon–AG2R La Mondiale	+ 17"

=== Stage 3 ===
23 January 2025 — Norwood to Uraidla, 147.5 km (91.7 mi)

Stage 3 Result
Rank	Rider	Team	Time
1	Javier Romo (ESP)	Movistar Team	3h 46' 01"
2	Jhonatan Narváez (ECU)	UAE Team Emirates XRG	+ 5"
3	Finn Fisher-Black (NZL)	Red Bull–Bora–Hansgrohe	+ 5"
4	Albert Withen Philipsen (DEN)	Lidl–Trek	+ 5"
5	Thomas Gloag (GBR)	Visma–Lease a Bike	+ 5"
6	Patrick Konrad (AUT)	Lidl–Trek	+ 5"
7	Andrea Bagioli (ITA)	Lidl–Trek	+ 5"
8	Bastien Tronchon (FRA)	Decathlon–AG2R La Mondiale	+ 5"
9	Rémy Rochas (FRA)	Groupama–FDJ	+ 5"
10	Magnus Sheffield (USA)	INEOS Grenadiers	+ 5"

General classification after Stage 3
Rank	Rider	Team	Time
1	Javier Romo (ESP)	Movistar Team	10h 13' 51"
2	Jhonatan Narváez (ECU)	UAE Team Emirates XRG	+ 8"
3	Patrick Konrad (AUT)	Lidl–Trek	+ 10"
4	Finn Fisher-Black (NZL)	Red Bull–Bora–Hansgrohe	+ 10"
5	Bastien Tronchon (FRA)	Decathlon–AG2R La Mondiale	+ 12"
6	Magnus Sheffield (USA)	INEOS Grenadiers	+ 15"
7	Albert Withen Philipsen (DEN)	Lidl–Trek	+ 15"
8	Jay Vine (AUS)	UAE Team Emirates XRG	+ 15"
9	Chris Harper (AUS)	Team Jayco–AlUla	+ 15"
10	Andrea Bagioli (ITA)	Lidl–Trek	+ 15"

=== Stage 4 ===
24 January 2025 — Glenelg to Victor Harbor, 157.2 km (97.7 mi)

Stage 4 Result
Rank	Rider	Team	Time
1	Bryan Coquard (FRA)	Cofidis	3h 55' 15"
2	Phil Bauhaus (GER)	Team Bahrain Victorious	+ 0"
3	Jhonatan Narváez (ECU)	UAE Team Emirates XRG	+ 0"
4	Liam Walsh (AUS)	Australia	+ 0"
5	Samuel Watson (GBR)	INEOS Grenadiers	+ 0"
6	Tobias Lund Andresen (DEN)	Team Picnic–PostNL	+ 0"
7	Corbin Strong (NZL)	Israel–Premier Tech	+ 0"
8	Tim Torn Teutenberg (GER)	Lidl–Trek	+ 0"
9	Henri Uhlig (GER)	Alpecin–Deceuninck	+ 0"
10	Dorian Godon (FRA)	Decathlon–AG2R La Mondiale	+ 0"

General classification after Stage 4
Rank	Rider	Team	Time
1	Javier Romo (ESP)	Movistar Team	14h 09' 06"
2	Jhonatan Narváez (ECU)	UAE Team Emirates XRG	+ 4"
3	Patrick Konrad (AUT)	Lidl–Trek	+ 10"
4	Finn Fisher-Black (NZL)	Red Bull–Bora–Hansgrohe	+ 10"
5	Bastien Tronchon (FRA)	Decathlon–AG2R La Mondiale	+ 12"
6	Magnus Sheffield (USA)	INEOS Grenadiers	+ 15"
7	Albert Withen Philipsen (DEN)	Lidl–Trek	+ 15"
8	Jay Vine (AUS)	UAE Team Emirates XRG	+ 15"
9	Rémy Rochas (FRA)	Groupama–FDJ	+ 15"
10	Chris Harper (AUS)	Team Jayco–AlUla	+ 15"

=== Stage 5 ===
25 January 2025 — McLaren Vale to Willunga Hill, 145.7 km (90.5 mi)

Stage 5 Result
Rank	Rider	Team	Time
1	Jhonatan Narváez (ECU)	UAE Team Emirates XRG	3h 17' 02"
2	Oscar Onley (GBR)	Team Picnic–PostNL	+ 0"
3	Finn Fisher-Black (NZL)	Red Bull–Bora–Hansgrohe	+ 0"
4	Luke Plapp (AUS)	Team Jayco–AlUla	+ 3"
5	Javier Romo (ESP)	Movistar Team	+ 3"
6	Michael Woods (CAN)	Israel–Premier Tech	+ 6"
7	Thomas Gloag (GBR)	Visma–Lease a Bike	+ 6"
8	Magnus Sheffield (USA)	INEOS Grenadiers	+ 6"
9	Bastien Tronchon (FRA)	Decathlon–AG2R La Mondiale	+ 6"
10	Patrick Konrad (AUT)	Lidl–Trek	+ 15"

General classification after Stage 5
Rank	Rider	Team	Time
1	Jhonatan Narváez (ECU)	UAE Team Emirates XRG	17h 26' 02"
2	Javier Romo (ESP)	Movistar Team	+ 9"
3	Finn Fisher-Black (NZL)	Red Bull–Bora–Hansgrohe	+ 12"
4	Oscar Onley (GBR)	Team Picnic–PostNL	+ 15"
5	Bastien Tronchon (FRA)	Decathlon–AG2R La Mondiale	+ 24"
6	Luke Plapp (AUS)	Team Jayco–AlUla	+ 24"
7	Magnus Sheffield (USA)	INEOS Grenadiers	+ 27"
8	Thomas Gloag (GBR)	Visma–Lease a Bike	+ 27"
9	Patrick Konrad (AUT)	Lidl–Trek	+ 31"
10	Michael Woods (CAN)	Israel–Premier Tech	+ 47"

=== Stage 6 ===
26 January 2025 — Adelaide to Adelaide, 90 km (55.9 mi)

Stage 6 Result
Rank	Rider	Team	Time
1	Sam Welsford (AUS)	Red Bull–Bora–Hansgrohe	1h 53' 14"
2	Bryan Coquard (FRA)	Cofidis	+ 0"
3	Phil Bauhaus (GER)	Team Bahrain Victorious	+ 0"
4	Rui Oliveira (POR)	UAE Team Emirates XRG	+ 0"
5	Danny Van Poppel (NED)	Red Bull–Bora–Hansgrohe	+ 0"
6	Henri Uhlig (GER)	Alpecin–Deceuninck	+ 0"
7	Tobias Lund Andresen (DEN)	Team Picnic–PostNL	+ 0"
8	Tim Torn Teutenberg (GER)	Lidl–Trek	+ 0"
9	Matthew Walls (GBR)	Groupama–FDJ	+ 0"
10	Andrea Raccagni Noviero (ITA)	Soudal–Quick-Step	+ 0"

General classification after Stage 6
Rank	Rider	Team	Time
1	Jhonatan Narváez (ECU)	UAE Team Emirates XRG	19h 19' 16"
2	Javier Romo (ESP)	Movistar Team	+ 9"
3	Finn Fisher-Black (NZL)	Red Bull–Bora–Hansgrohe	+ 12"
4	Oscar Onley (GBR)	Team Picnic–PostNL	+ 15"
5	Bastien Tronchon (FRA)	Decathlon–AG2R La Mondiale	+ 24"
6	Luke Plapp (AUS)	Team Jayco–AlUla	+ 24"
7	Magnus Sheffield (USA)	INEOS Grenadiers	+ 27"
8	Thomas Gloag (GBR)	Visma–Lease a Bike	+ 27"
9	Patrick Konrad (AUT)	Lidl–Trek	+ 31"
10	Michael Woods (CAN)	Israel–Premier Tech	+ 47"

== Classification leadership table ==
Classification leadership by stage
Stage	Winner	General classification	Sprints classification	Mountains classification	Young rider classification	Most competitive rider(s)	Team classification
1	Sam Welsford	Sam Welsford	Sam Welsford	Fergus Browning	Matthew Brennan	Fergus Browning & Zac Marriage	Alpecin–Deceuninck
2	Sam Welsford	Sam Welsford	Sam Welsford	Fergus Browning	Matthew Brennan	Georg Zimmermann	Alpecin–Deceuninck
3	Javier Romo	Javier Romo	Sam Welsford	Fergus Browning	Albert Withen Philipsen	Geoffrey Bouchard	Lidl–Trek
4	Bryan Coquard	Javier Romo	Sam Welsford	Fergus Browning	Albert Withen Philipsen	Mauro Schmid	Lidl–Trek
5	Jhonatan Narváez	Jhonatan Narváez	Sam Welsford	Fergus Browning	Albert Withen Philipsen	Chris Harper	Lidl–Trek
6	Sam Welsford	Jhonatan Narváez	Sam Welsford	Fergus Browning	Albert Withen Philipsen	Casper Pedersen	Lidl–Trek
Final		Jhonatan Narváez	Sam Welsford	Fergus Browning	Albert Withen Philipsen		Lidl–Trek

== Classification standings ==
Legend
Denotes the leader of the general classification	Denotes the leader of the sprints classification
Denotes the leader of the mountains classification	Denotes the leader of the young rider classification
Denotes the winner of the combativity award	

=== General classification ===
Final general classification (1–10)
Rank	Rider	Team	Time
1	Jhonatan Narváez (ECU)	UAE Team Emirates XRG	19h 19' 16"
2	Javier Romo (ESP)	Movistar Team	+ 9"
3	Finn Fisher-Black (NZL)	Red Bull–Bora–Hansgrohe	+ 12"
4	Oscar Onley (GBR)	Team Picnic–PostNL	+ 15"
5	Bastien Tronchon (FRA)	Decathlon–AG2R La Mondiale	+ 24"
6	Luke Plapp (AUS)	Team Jayco–AlUla	+ 24"
7	Magnus Sheffield (USA)	INEOS Grenadiers	+ 27"
8	Thomas Gloag (GBR)	Visma–Lease a Bike	+ 27"
9	Patrick Konrad (AUT)	Lidl–Trek	+ 31"
10	Michael Woods (CAN)	Israel–Premier Tech	+ 47"

=== Sprints classification ===
Final sprints classification (1–10)
Rank	Rider	Team	Points
1	Sam Welsford (AUS)	Red Bull–Bora–Hansgrohe	90
2	Bryan Coquard (FRA)	Cofidis	77
3	Phil Bauhaus (GER)	Team Bahrain Victorious	61
4	Jhonatan Narváez (ECU)	UAE Team Emirates XRG	60
5	Tim Torn Teutenberg (GER)	Lidl–Trek	60
6	Tobias Lund Andresen (DEN)	Team Picnic–PostNL	50
7	Henri Uhlig (GER)	Alpecin–Deceuninck	43
8	Corbin Strong (NZL)	Israel–Premier Tech	42
9	Matthew Walls (GBR)	Groupama–FDJ	38
10	Javier Romo (ESP)	Movistar Team	31

=== Mountains classification ===
Final mountains classification (1–10)
Rank	Rider	Team	Points
1	Fergus Browning (AUS)	Australia	58
2	Mauro Schmid (SUI)	Team Jayco–AlUla	27
3	Jhonatan Narváez (ECU)	UAE Team Emirates XRG	16
4	Chris Harper (AUS)	Team Jayco–AlUla	16
5	Javier Romo (ESP)	Movistar Team	15
6	Zac Marriage (AUS)	Australia	15
7	Damien Howson (AUS)	Australia	11
8	Finn Fisher-Black (NZL)	Red Bull–Bora–Hansgrohe	11
9	Rémy Rochas (FRA)	Groupama–FDJ	10
10	Patrick Konrad (AUT)	Lidl–Trek	10

=== Young rider classification ===
Final young rider classification (1–10)
Rank	Rider	Team	Time
1	Albert Withen Philipsen (DEN)	Lidl–Trek	19h 20' 25"
2	Zac Marriage (AUS)	Australia	+ 15"
3	Pablo Torres (ESP)	UAE Team Emirates XRG	+ 20"
4	Lukas Nerurkar (GBR)	EF Education–EasyPost	+ 1' 41"
5	Menno Huising (NED)	Visma–Lease a Bike	+ 3' 07"
6	Tijmen Graat (NED)	Visma–Lease a Bike	+ 4' 33"
7	Fergus Browning (AUS)	Australia	+ 4' 52"
8	Matthew Brennan (GBR)	Visma–Lease a Bike	+ 5' 27"
9	Bjoern Koerdt (GBR)	Team Picnic–PostNL	+ 5' 33"
10	Diego Pescador (COL)	Movistar Team	+ 11' 17"

=== Teams classification ===
Final team classification (1–10)
Rank	Team	Time
1	(United States) Lidl–Trek	58h 00' 34"
2	(United Arab Emirates) UAE Team Emirates XRG	+ 2"
3	Israel–Premier Tech	+ 1' 50"
4	(Australia) Team Jayco–AlUla	+ 4' 58"
5	(France) Groupama–FDJ	+ 5' 22"
6	Australia	+ 6' 01"
7	(France) Decathlon–AG2R La Mondiale	+ 6' 12"
8	(Netherlands) Visma–Lease a Bike	+ 6' 13"
9	(France) Arkéa–B&B Hotels	+ 8' 26"
10	(Spain) Movistar Team	+ 9' 08"
