= Héctor Carretero =

Spanish cyclist

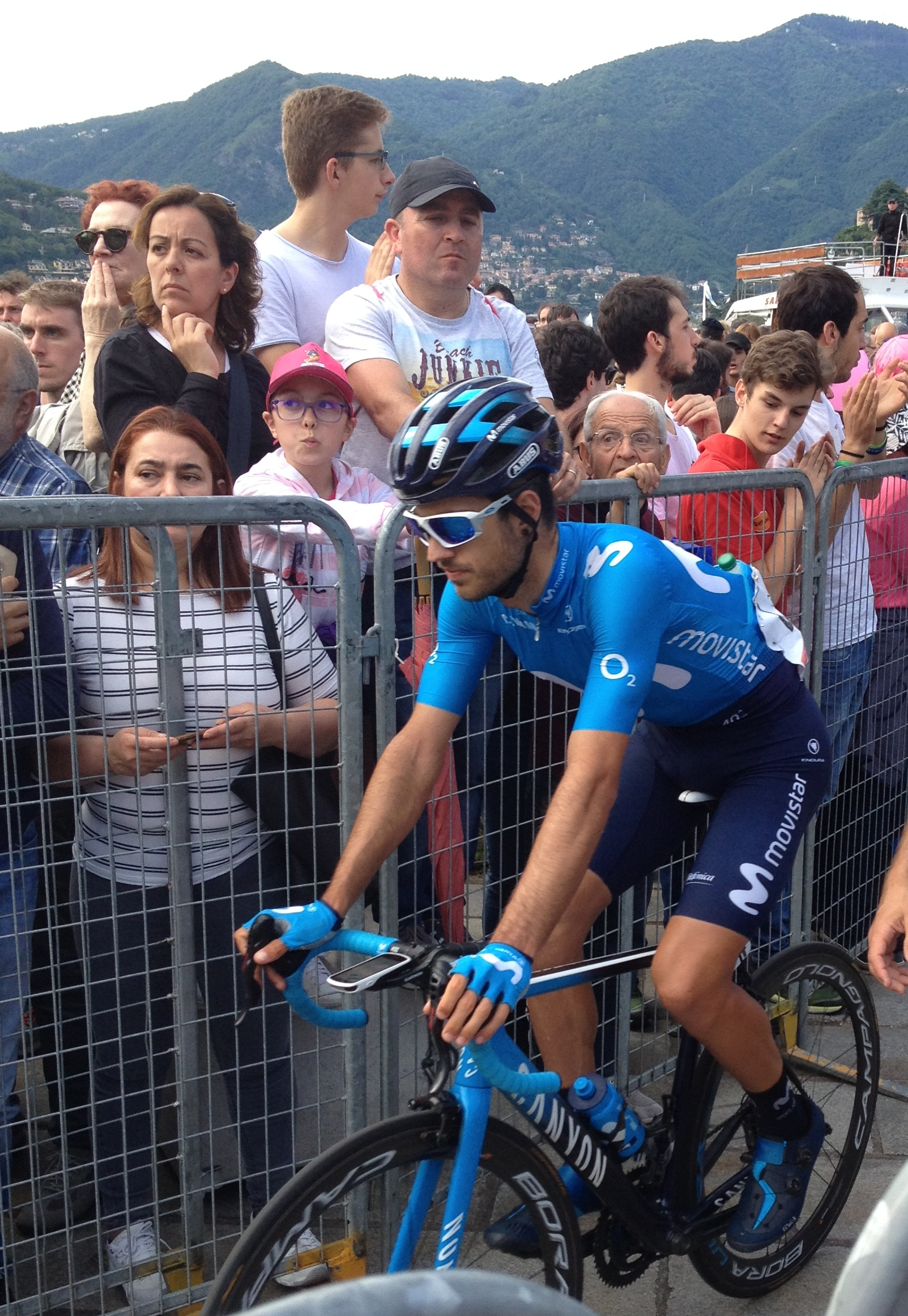
- Carretero at the 2019 Giro d'Italia

Personal information
- Full name: Héctor Carretero Milla
- Born: 28 May 1995 (age 31) Madrigueras, Spain
- Height: 1.83 m (6 ft 0 in)
- Weight: 67 kg (148 lb)

Cycling career
- Sport: Cycling
- Current team: Retired
- Discipline: Road
- Role: Rider

Amateur team
- 2014–2016: Lizarte–AD Galibier

Professional teams
- 2017–2021: Movistar Team
- 2022–2023: Equipo Kern Pharma

Héctor Carretero Milla (born 28 May 1995) is a Spanish former cyclist, who competed as a professional from 2017 to 2023. In May 2019, he was named in the startlist for the 2019 Giro d'Italia.

== Major results ==
2020
1st Mountains classification, Tirreno–Adriatico
7th Overall Vuelta a Murcia
2021
1st Stage 2 Vuelta Asturias
3rd Trofeo Serra de Tramuntana
4th Prueba Villafranca - Ordiziako Klasika

=== Grand Tour general classification results timeline ===
Grand Tour	2019	2020
Giro d'Italia	88	79
Tour de France	—	—
Vuelta a España	—	—
