= 2024 UCI America Tour =

2023–24 UCI America Tour
- Twentieth edition of the UCI America Tour

Details
- Dates: 17 November 2023 – 8 October 2024
- Location: North America and South America
- Races: 22

The 2024 UCI America Tour was the 20th season of the UCI America Tour. The season began on 17 November 2023 with the Vuelta Ciclista Internacional a Guatemala and ended on 8 October 2024.

The points leader, based on the cumulative results of previous races, wore the UCI America Tour cycling jersey. Throughout the season, points were awarded to the top finishers of stages within stage races and the final general classification standings of each of the stages races and one-day events. The quality and complexity of a race also determined how many points were awarded to the top finishers, the higher the UCI rating of a race, the more points were awarded.

The UCI ratings from highest to lowest were as follows:

- Multi-day events: 2.1 and 2.2
- One-day events: 1.1 and 1.2

== Events ==
Races in the 2024 UCI America Tour
Race	Rating	Date	Winner	Team
Vuelta Ciclista Internacional a Guatemala	2.2	17–26 November 2023	Gerson Toc (GUA)	Decoba–ASO Quetzaltenango
Vuelta Ciclista Internacional a Costa Rica	2.2	16–25 December 2023	Juan Diego Alba (COL)	Movistar–Best PC
(Venezuela) Vuelta al Táchira en Bicicleta	2.2	14–21 January 2024	Jonathan Klever Caicedo (ECU)	Petrolike
Tour Colombia	2.1	6–11 February 2024	Rodrigo Contreras (COL)	Nu Colombia
Jamaica International Cycling Classic	2.2	5–7 April 2024	Wilmar Paredes (COL)	Team Medellín–EPM
(United States) Tour of the Gila	2.2	24–28 April 2024	Tyler Stites (USA)	Project Echelon Racing
(Guatemala) Vuelta BANTRAB	2.2	1–5 May 2024	Jonathan Caicedo (COL)	Petrolike
(United States) Gran Premio New York City	1.2	19 May 2024	Tibor Del Grosso (NED)	Alpecin–Premier Tech Development Team
(Honduras) Elite Road Central American Championships ITT	1.2	6 June 2024	Franklin Archibold (PAN)	Panama (national team)
(Honduras) Elite Road Central American Championships ITT	1.2U	6 June 2024	Donovan Ramírez (CRC)	Costa Rica (national team)
(Honduras) Elite Road Central American Championships TTT	1.2	7 June 2024	Christofer Jurado; Franklin Archibold; Sandi Guerra; Bredio Ruiz; Randish Abdul Lorenzo; Alex Strah	Panama (national team)
(Honduras) Elite Road Central American Championships IRR	1.2	9 June 2024	Franklin Archibold (PAN)	Panama (national team)
(Canada) Tour de Beauce	2.2	12–16 June 2024	Josh Burnett (NZL)	Whoosh–NZ Cycling Project
Vuelta a Colombia	2.2	14–23 June 2024	Rodrigo Contreras (COL)	Nu Colombia
Vuelta a Venezuela	2.2	6–13 October 2024	Walter Vargas (COL)	Team Medellín–EPM
