= Fergus Browning =

Australian cyclist

Personal information
- Born: 4 December 2003 (age 22) Yarraville, Victoria, Australia

Cycling career
- Sport: Cycling
- Current team: Terengganu Cycling Team
- Discipline: Road
- Role: Rider

Amateur teams
- 2020: St Kilda Cycling Club
- 2021: Footscray Cycling Club
- 2022: Inform TMX MAKE

Professional teams
- 2022: Trinity Racing (stagiaire)
- 2023–2024: Trinity Racing
- 2025: CCACHE x BODYWRAP
- 2026–: Terengganu Cycling Team

Fergus Browning is an Australian racing cyclist.

== Career ==
Browning won the 2022 Merv Dean Memorial Tour.

In 2023, he moved to Europe to compete with Trinity Racing.

He won the 2024 U-23 Australian National Road Race Championships

That same year he won stage 1, and wore the leaders jersey, at the professional Tour de l'Ain.

Browning won the King of the Mountains jersey at the 2025 Tour Down Under. On stage 1, he was also jointly named the most competitive rider.

He joined Terengganu Cycling Team for the 2026 cycling season.

== Major results ==
2022
5th Time trial, National Under-23 Road Championships
2023
5th Time trial, National Under-23 Road Championships
2024 (1 pro win)
National Under-23 Road Championships

1st Road race
5th Time trial

1st Stage 1 Tour de l'Ain
2025
1st Mountains classification, Tour Down Under
National Under-23 Road Championships

2nd Road race
2nd Time trial

2026
1st Prologue Pune Grand Tour
2nd Grand Prix Pedalia
4th Overall Tour de Kumano
4th Oceania Road Cycling Championships Road race
5th Overall Tour of Japan
7th Overall Tour de Taiwan
