= Wilson Haro =

Ecuadorian road cyclist

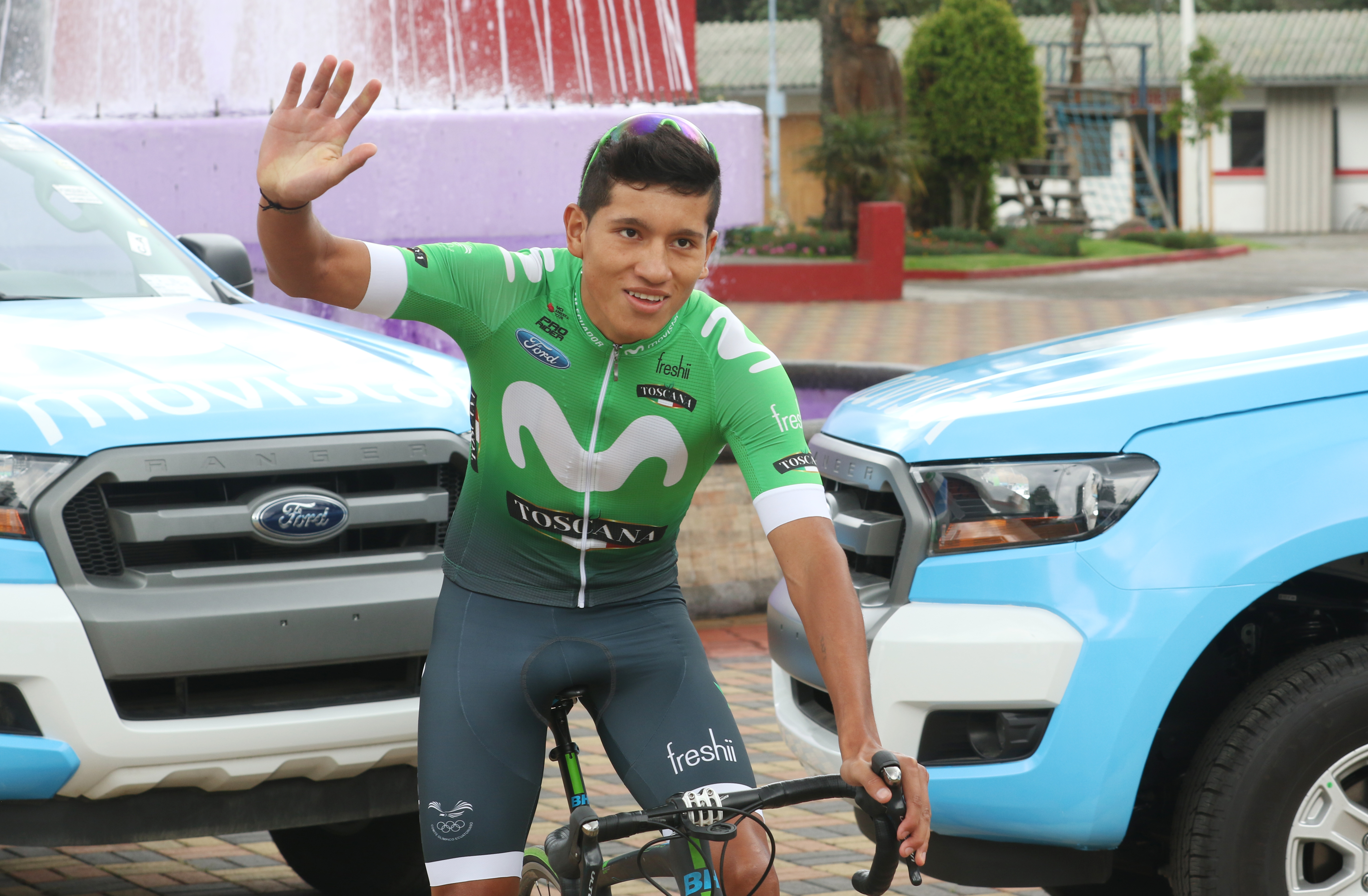

Personal information
- Full name: Wilson Steven Haro Criollo
- Born: 5 January 1998 (age 28) Urcuquí, Ecuador

Cycling career
- Sport: Cycling
- Current team: Team Banco Guayaquil–Bianchi
- Discipline: Road
- Role: Rider

Amateur teams
- 2020: Caja Rural–Seguros RGA amateur
- 2021: Essax

Professional teams
- 2017–2019: Team Ecuador
- 2022–: Team Banco Guayaquil–Ecuador

Wilson Steven Haro Criollo (born 5 January 1998) is an Ecuadorian road cyclist, who currently rides for UCI Continental team Team Banco Guayaquil–Bianchi. He competed in the road race at the 2021 UCI Road World Championships.

== Major results ==
2016
Pan American Junior Road Championships

7th Time trial
10th Road race

2017
10th Overall Vuelta Independencia Nacional
2018
6th Time trial, Pan American Under-23 Road Championships
2019
1st Overall Vuelta Ciclista a Miranda

1st Young rider classification

6th Overall Vuelta a Venezuela
6th Overall Tour de l'Espoir

1st Mountains classification

10th Road race, Pan American Under-23 Road Championships
2020
9th Overall Vuelta al Ecuador
2021
1st Overall Vuelta al Ecuador

1st Stage 6

5th Road race, National Road Championships
2022
6th Overall Vuelta a Formosa Internacional
