= Cristian Camilo Muñoz =

Colombian cyclist (1996–2026)

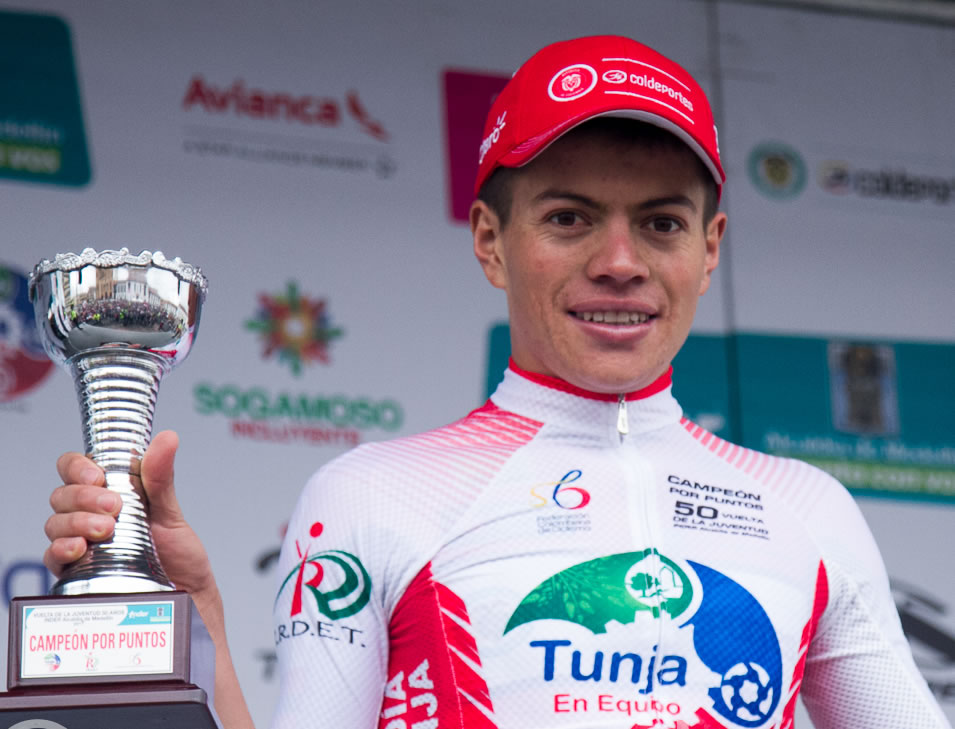
- Muñoz in 2017

Personal information
- Full name: Cristian Camilo Muñoz Lancheros
- Born: 20 March 1996 Ventaquemada, Colombia
- Died: 24 April 2026 (aged 30) Oviedo, Spain
- Height: 1.79 m (5 ft 10 in)
- Weight: 63 kg (139 lb)

Cycling career
- Sport: Cycling
- Discipline: Road
- Role: Rider

Amateur teams
- 2015–2016: Coldeportes–Claro
- 2022–2023: EPM–Scott

Professional teams
- 2017–2018: Coldeportes–Zenú
- 2019–2021: UAE Team Emirates
- 2024–2026: Nu Colombia

Cristian Camilo Muñoz Lancheros (20 March 1996 – 24 April 2026) was a Colombian professional cyclist who competed from 2017 until his death in 2026.

== Biography ==
Muñoz made his international breakthrough at the Under-23 level in 2018. He was one of the top climbers at the Giro d'Italia Under-23, where he won a stage, but his descending skills proved lacking, and he ultimately had to settle for seventh place in the general classification.

After spending three seasons with the UAE Emirates team without achieving any significant results, his contract was not renewed. For the 2022 season, Muñoz signed with the EPM-Scott team, aiming to demonstrate—by competing in a lower-tier race calendar—that his climbing prowess remained intact, and thereby convince a WorldTour team to give him a second chance.

Muñoz died at an hospital in Oviedo, on 24 April 2026, due to a hospital-acquired bacterial infection contracted following a knee injury sustained during a fall at the Tour du Jura. He was 30.

== Major results ==
2018
7th Overall Giro Ciclistico d'Italia

1st Stage 8

2020
10th Time trial, National Road Championships
2022
5th Juegos Bolivarianos Road Race
2023
2nd Circuito Ciclístico Jenesano
3rd Vuelta al Tolima
2024
4th Road race, National Championships
