= Javier Jamaica =

Colombian cyclist

Personal information
- Full name: Javier Ernesto Jamaica Mejía
- Born: 2 March 1996 (age 30) Bogotá, Colombia

Cycling career
- Sport: Cycling
- Current team: Nu Colombia
- Disciplines: Road; Track
- Role: Rider

Amateur team
- 2017–2020: Depormundo–M.Bosa–Ramguiflex

Professional teams
- 2021: Colnago CM Team
- 2022–2024: Team Medellín–EPM
- 2025–: Nu Colombia

Javier Ernesto Jamaica Mejía (born 2 March 1996) is a Colombian road racing cyclist, who currently rides for UCI Continental team Nu Colombia.

== Major results ==
2020
9th Overall Clásico RCN

1st Stage 6

2021
1st Overall Clásica Ciudad de Soacha

1st Stage 1 (ITT)

2nd Overall Vuelta a Cundinamarca

1st Stage 1 (ITT)

2022
1st Overall Vuelta a Antioquia
4th Overall Vuelta al Ecuador
2023
1st Overall Vuelta a Catamarca (Note: Awarded after the initial winner Miguel Ángel López was disqualified for doping.)

1st Stage 3

1st Gran Premio Chapin
1st Stages 2 & 3 Vuelta al Sur
2nd Overall Clásica de Rionegro

1st Stage 1 (TTT)

5th Road race, National Road Championships
10th Gran Premio Guatemala
2024
2nd Overall Vuelta a Venezuela

1st Mountains classification
1st Points classification
1st Stage 5

3rd Overall Vuelta Bantrab
3rd Overall Vuelta al Tolima
5th Overall Vuelta a Colombia
5th Overall Vuelta a Guatemala

1st Stage 9

9th Overall Clásico RCN

1st Stage 1 (TTT)

2025
1st Overall Vuelta al Valle del Cauca

1st Stage 3

1st Overall Vuelta al Tolima

1st Mountains classification
1st Stage 3

3rd Overall Clásico RCN
3rd Overall Vuelta a Boyacá
