= Alejandro Osorio (cyclist) =

Colombian cyclist (born 1998)

Personal information
- Full name: Alejandro Osorio Carvajal
- Nickname: Pony
- Born: 28 May 1998 (age 28) El Carmen de Viboral, Colombia
- Height: 1.81 m (5 ft 11 in)
- Weight: 62 kg (137 lb)

Cycling career
- Sport: Cycling
- Current team: GW Erco SportFitness
- Discipline: Road
- Role: Rider

Amateur team
- 2022: EPM–Scott

Professional teams
- 2017–2018: GW–Shimano
- 2019: Nippo–Vini Fantini–Faizanè
- 2020–2021: Caja Rural–Seguros RGA
- 2022: Team Bahrain Victorious
- 2023–: GW Shimano–Sidermec

Major wins
- One-day races and Classics National Road Race Championships (2024)

Alejandro Osorio Carvajal (born 28 May 1998) is a Colombian cyclist, who currently rides for UCI Continental team GW Erco SportFitness.

Osorio originally signed with UCI WorldTeam Team Bahrain Victorious for 2022 and 2023 seasons but his contract was terminated in April 2022 for multiple contract breaches. For the rest of the 2022 season he joined Colombian amateur team EPM–Scott.

== Major results ==
2018
1st Mountains classification, Tour de l'Avenir
6th Overall Giro Ciclistico d'Italia

1st Stage 4

2021
1st Mountains classification, Settimana Internazionale di Coppi e Bartali
6th Overall Vuelta Asturias
2022
Clásica Carmen de Viboral

1st Stages 1 (TTT) & 4

3rd Overall Clásica de Girardot
2024 (2 pro wins)
1st Road race, National Road Championships
Vuelta al Tachira

1st Points classification
1st Stage 8

1st Stage 3 Tour Colombia
1st Stages 2, 3 & 5 Vuelta a Colombia
