= Óscar Pachón =

Colombian bicycle racer (born 1987)

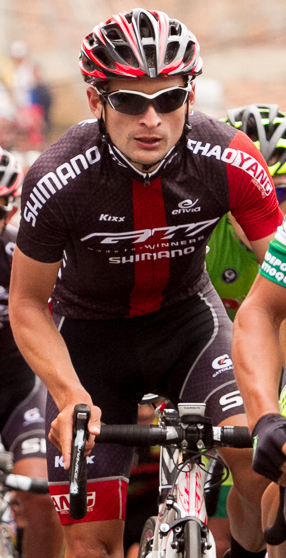
- Pachón in 2016

Personal information
- Born: 28 April 1987 (age 39) Zipaquirá, Colombia

Cycling career
- Sport: Cycling
- Current team: Yunnan Lvshan Landscape
- Discipline: Road
- Role: Rider

Amateur teams
- 2010: Formesan–Bogotá Humana
- 2014: Movistar Team América
- 2015: GW–Shimano
- 2018: Multirepuestos Bosa–Fundación Everet
- 2019: IMRD–Chia
- 2020–2021: Sundark Arawak Eca Team
- 2022: DCC
- 2022–2023: Iowa Latino–Bicicletas Addict

Professional teams
- 2008: UNE
- 2010: EPM–UNE
- 2016: GW–Shimano
- 2017: RTS–Monton Racing Team
- 2018: China Continental Team of Gansu Bank
- 2023–: Yunnan Lvshan Landscape

Óscar Mauricio Pachón Melo (born 28 April 1987) is a Colombian professional road cyclist, who currently rides for UCI Continental team Yunnan Lvshan Landscape.

== Major results ==
2008
6th Overall Doble Sucre Potosí GP Cemento Fancesa
2012
8th Overall Vuelta Ciclista de Chile
2013
1st Stage 5 Vuelta a Antioquia
2nd Overall Vuelta a la Independencia Nacional
2014
1st Tobago Cycling Classic
4th Road race, National Road Championships
2015
1st Overall Vuelta a Cundinamarca

1st Stages 1 & 2

3rd Overall Vuelta Mexico
2016
1st Stage 2 Tour of Tobago
4th Overall Vuelta al Tolima

1st Mountains classification

4th Tobago Cycling Classic
2018
1st Overall Tour of Tobago

1st Stages 1 & 5

4th Overall Vuelta a Cundinamarca

1st Stage 2

2020
3rd Overall Vuelta al Tolima
2022
1st Overall Tour por la Paz

1st Stage 3

2023
1st Overall Chengdu Tianfu Greenway International Cycling Race

1st Mountains classification

4th Overall Vuelta a la Independencia Nacional

1st Mountains classification
