= Robinson Chalapud =

Colombian cyclist

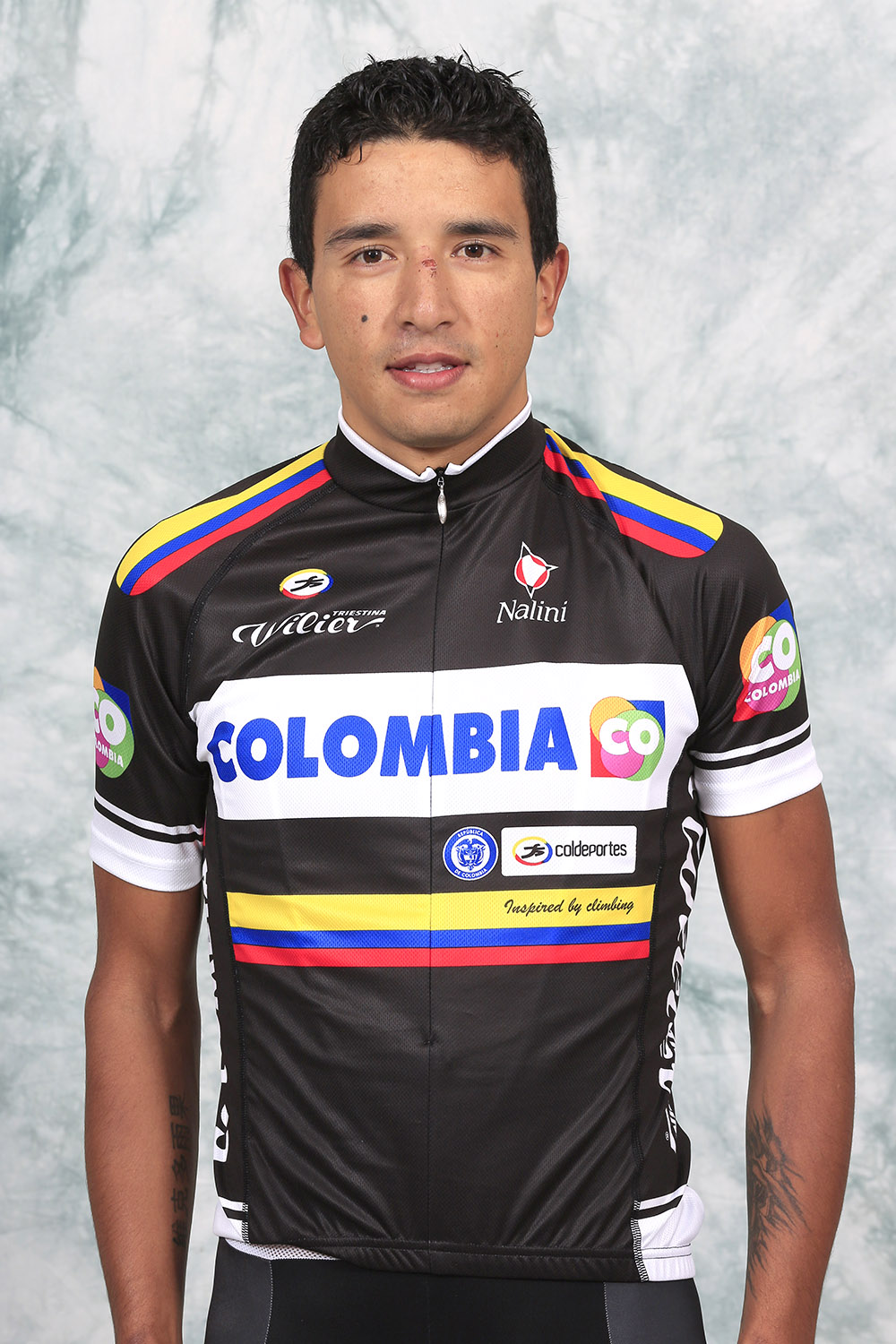
- Chalapud in 2013

Personal information
- Full name: Robinson Eduardo Chalapud Gómez
- Nickname: El Chala
- Born: 8 March 1984 (age 42) Ipiales, Colombia
- Height: 1.75 m (5 ft 9 in)
- Weight: 63 kg (139 lb)

Cycling career
- Sport: Cycling
- Current team: Team Banco Guayaquil–Bianchi
- Discipline: Road
- Role: Rider
- Rider type: Climber

Amateur teams
- 2007–2010: Colombia es Pasión
- 2026: Ho Chi Minh City Police

Professional teams
- 2011: Colombia es Pasión–Café de Colombia
- 2012–2014: Colombia–Coldeportes
- 2015: Orgullo Antioqueño
- 2016: Inteja–MMR Dominican Cycling Team
- 2017: GW–Shimano
- 2018–2021: Medellín
- 2022–: Team Banco Guayaquil–Ecuador

Major wins
- Single-day races and Classics National Road Race Championships (2015)

Robinson Eduardo Chalapud Gómez (born 8 March 1984) is a Colombian racing cyclist, who currently rides for UCI Continental team Team Banco Guayaquil–Bianchi. He competed in the 2014 Giro d'Italia and won the 2015 Colombian National Road Race Championships.

== Major results ==
2006
4th Overall Vuelta a Guatemala
2010
7th Overall Circuito Montañés
2011
5th Overall Tour de l'Ain
6th GP Miguel Induráin
8th Klasika Primavera
10th Prueba Villafranca de Ordizia
2014
10th Coppa Sabatini
2015
1st Road race, National Road Championships
3rd Overall Joe Martin Stage Race
6th Overall Tour of the Gila
2018
4th Overall Vuelta a Asturias
2019
1st Overall Tour of Qinghai Lake

1st Stage 1 (TTT)

1st Overall Vuelta a la Independencia Nacional

1st Stage 1

2021
1st Stage 7 Vuelta a Colombia
2022
1st Overall Vuelta al Ecuador

1st Stage 3

1st Mountains classification, Vuelta Ciclista a Costa Rica
1st Stages 1 & 5 Vuelta a Guatemala
8th Overall Vuelta a Colombia

1st Stage 9

2023
1st Overall Vuelta al Ecuador

1st Stage 2

=== Grand Tour general classification results timeline ===
Grand Tour	2013	2014
Giro d'Italia	94	75
Tour de France	—	—
Vuelta a España	—	—

Legend
—	Did not compete
DNF	Did not finish
