= Rodrigo Contreras (cyclist) =

Colombian road racing cyclist

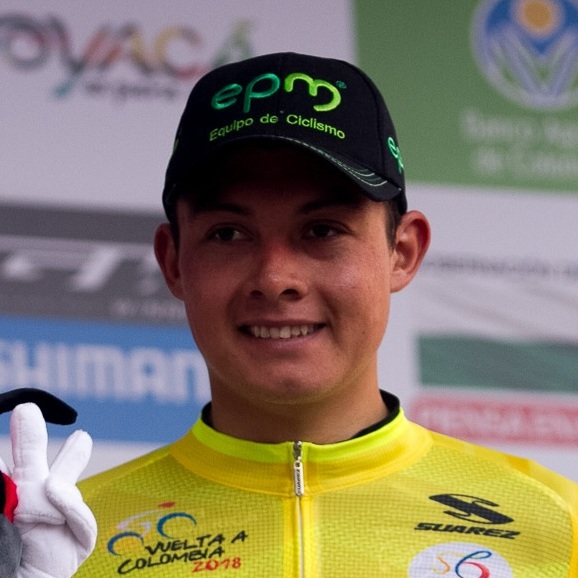
- Contreras in 2018

Personal information
- Full name: Rodrigo Contreras Pinzón
- Nickname: Rocky
- Born: June 2, 1994 (age 32) Villapinzón, Colombia
- Height: 1.80 m (5 ft 11 in)
- Weight: 68 kg (150 lb)

Cycling career
- Sport: Cycling
- Current team: Nu Colombia
- Discipline: Road
- Role: Rider

Amateur teams
- 2014–2015: Coldeportes–Claro
- 2022–2023: EPM–Scott

Professional teams
- 2013: Colombia–Coldeportes
- → 2015: Etixx–Quick-Step (stagiaire)
- 2016: Etixx–Quick-Step
- 2017: Coldeportes–Zenú
- 2018: EPM
- 2019–2021: Astana
- 2024–: Nu Colombia
Medal record
Representing Colombia
Men's road cycling
Event	1st	2nd	3rd
Pan American Championships	2	2	0
CAC Games	1	0	0
South American Games	1	1	0
Bolivarian Games	1	2	0
Total	5	5	0
Pan American Championships
Gold medal – first place	2014 Puebla	Under-23 time trial
Gold medal – first place	2022 San Juan	Time trial
Silver medal – second place	2017 Santo Domingo	Time trial
Silver medal – second place	2025 Punta del Este	Time trial
Central American and Caribbean Games
Gold medal – first place	2018 Barranquilla	Time trial
South American Games
Gold medal – first place	2018 Cochabamba	Time trial
Silver medal – second place	2022 Asunción	Time trial
Bolivarian Games
Gold medal – first place	2017 Santa Marta	Time trial
Silver medal – second place	2022 Valledupar	Road race
Silver medal – second place	2022 Valledupar	Time trial

Rodrigo Contreras Pinzón (born June 2, 1994, in Villapinzón) is a Colombian cyclist, who currently rides for UCI Continental team Nu Colombia. He previously rode for Etixx–Quick-Step and Astana. In October 2020, he was named in the startlist for the 2020 Giro d'Italia.

== Major results ==
2013
1st Stage 6 Vuelta a Bolivia
2014
Pan American Under-23 Road Championships

1st Time trial
4th Road race

2nd Time trial, National Under-23 Road Championships
2015
1st Stage 1 (TTT) Czech Cycling Tour
5th Overall Tour de San Luis

1st Young rider classification

2016
1st Stage 1 (TTT) Tour de San Luis
2017
1st Time trial, Bolivarian Games
2nd Time trial, Pan American Road Championships
2nd Time trial, National Road Championships
2018
South American Games

1st Time trial
5th Road race

1st Time trial, Central American and Caribbean Games
Vuelta a Colombia

1st Prologue & Stage 7 (ITT)

4th Time trial, Pan American Road Championships
4th Time trial, National Road Championships
2019
4th Time trial, National Road Championships
10th Overall Tour du Rwanda

1st Stage 8

10th Overall Tour Colombia
2022
1st Time trial, Pan American Road Championships
1st Overall Vuelta al Valle del Cauca

1st Stages 3 & 4

1st Overall Vuelta a Boyacá

1st Stages 3 & 4

1st Overall Clásica Rionegro con Futuro-Aguas de Rionegro

1st Stage 2

1st Overall Clásica Ciudad de Girardot

1st Prologue

1st Overall Clásica de Fusagasugá

1st Stage 1

1st Overall Clásica Carmen de Viboral

1st Stage 1 (TTT)

South American Games

2nd Time trial

Bolivarian Games

2nd Road race
2nd Time trial

2nd Overall Vuelta al Tolima
5th Time trial, National Road Championships
9th Overall Vuelta a Colombia

1st Stage 10

2023
1st Overall Vuelta a Boyacá

1st Stage 3 (ITT)

1st Overall Clásica el Carmen de Viboral
2nd Overall Vuelta a Colombia
2nd Overall Clásico RCN

1st Stage 6

2nd Overall Vuelta a Cundinamarca

1st Stage 1 (ITT)

2nd Overall Vuelta al Tolima
3rd Time trial, National Road Championships
2024
1st Overall Tour Colombia
1st Overall Vuelta a Colombia

1st Points classification
1st Prologue & Stage 9 (ITT)

1st Overall Vuelta al Tolima

1st Stages 3 & 4

3rd Time trial, National Road Championships
3rd Overall Clásica de Rionegro
4th Overall Vuelta Bantrab

1st Stage 3

2025
1st Overall Vuelta a Colombia

1st Stage 3 (ITT)

1st Overall Vuelta a Boyacá

1st Stage 3 (ITT)

1st Overall Clásica Nacional Ciudad de Anapoima

1st Points classification
1st Mountains classification
1st Stages 2 & 3 (ITT)

1st Overall Clásica de Rionegro

1st Points classification

1st Overall Clásica Carmen de Viboral

1st Stages 1 (ITT) & 3

1st Stage 8 Vuelta a Guatemala
2nd Time trial, Pan American Road Championships
3rd Overall Vuelta al Valle del Cauca
4th Time trial, National Road Championships
6th Overall Clásico RCN
2026
3rd Time trial, National Road Championships

=== Grand Tour general classification results timeline ===
Grand Tour	2020
Giro d'Italia	110
Tour de France	—
Vuelta a España	—

Legend
—	Did not compete
DNF	Did not finish
