= Daniel Méndez =

Colombian cyclist

Personal information
- Full name: Daniel Alejandro Méndez Noreña
- Born: 2 June 2000 (age 26) Bogotá, Colombia
- Height: 1.71 m (5 ft 7 in)
- Weight: 57 kg (126 lb)

Cycling career
- Sport: Cycling
- Current team: Nu Colombia
- Discipline: Road
- Role: Rider

Amateur team
- 2019: AV Villas

Professional teams
- 2020–2022: Equipo Kern Pharma
- 2023: EPM–Scott
- 2024–: Nu Colombia

Daniel Alejandro Méndez Noreña (born 2 June 2000) is a Colombian cyclist, who currently rides for UCI Continental team Nu Colombia.

== Major results ==
2018
1st Overall Challenge Montaña Central de Asturias Junior
2023
2nd Overall Vuelta a Boyacá
2024
9th Overall Tour Colombia
