= Team Banco Guayaquil–Bianchi =

Ecuadorian cycling team

Team information
- UCI code: BGE
- Registered: Ecuador
- Founded: 2022
- Discipline: Road
- Status: UCI Continental

Key personnel
- Team manager: Victor Hugo Peña

Team name history
- 2022–2023; 2024–: Team Banco Guayaquil–Ecuador; Team Banco Guayaquil–Bianchi

Team Banco Guayaquil–Bianchi is an Ecuadorian UCI Continental cycling team established in 2022.

== Team roster ==
As of 6 February 2024.

Rider	Date of birth
Sebastian Caicedo (ECU)	21 June 2001 (age 25)
Marcelo Casanova (ECU)	6 December 2005 (age 20)
Robinson Chalapud (COL)	8 March 1984 (age 42)
Miguel Eduardo Flórez (COL)	21 February 1996 (age 30)
Ronald Leiton (ECU)	3 November 2004 (age 21)
Lenin Javier Montenegro (ECU)	29 September 2000 (age 25)
Cristhian Montoya (COL)	4 August 1989 (age 37)

Rider	Date of birth
Kevin Navas (ECU)	28 January 2005 (age 21)
Cristian Pita (ECU)	6 February 1995 (age 31)
Sebastián Pita (ECU)	18 December 2003 (age 22)
Benjamín Quinteros (ECU)	1 October 1997 (age 28)
Aldemar Reyes (COL)	22 April 1995 (age 31)
Jose Sarmiento (ECU)	7 August 2004 (age 22)
