= List of teams and cyclists in the 2003 Giro d'Italia =

The 2003 Giro d'Italia was the 86th edition of the Giro d'Italia, one of cycling's Grand Tours. The field consisted of 170 riders, and 97 riders finished the race.

== By rider ==
Legend
No.	Starting number worn by the rider during the Giro
Pos.	Position in the general classification
DNF	Denotes a rider who did not finish

No.	Name	Nationality	Team	Pos.	Ref
1	Fabio Baldato	Italy	Alessio	76	
2	Pietro Caucchioli	Italy	Alessio	26	
3	Angelo Furlan	Italy	Alessio	DNF	
4	Denis Lunghi	Italy	Alessio	38	
5	Ruggero Marzoli	Italy	Alessio	DNF	
6	Vladimir Miholjević	Croatia	Alessio	40	
7	Cristian Moreni	Italy	Alessio	DNF	
8	Andrea Noè	Italy	Alessio	4	
9	Franco Pellizotti	Italy	Alessio	9	
11	Pavel Tonkov	Russia	CCC–Polsat	DNF	
12	Dariusz Baranowski	Poland	CCC–Polsat	12	
13	Tomasz Brożyna	Poland	CCC–Polsat	31	
14	Bogdan Bondariew	Ukraine	CCC–Polsat	DNF	
15	Piotr Chmielewski	Poland	CCC–Polsat	49	
16	Seweryn Kohut	Poland	CCC–Polsat	DNF	
17	Andris Naudužs	Latvia	CCC–Polsat	DNF	
18	Piotr Przydział	Poland	CCC–Polsat	DNF	
19	Radosław Romanik	Poland	CCC–Polsat	33	
21	Giuliano Figueras	Italy	Ceramiche Panaria–Fiordo	28	
22	Julio Alberto Pérez	Mexico	Ceramiche Panaria–Fiordo	DNF	
23	Graeme Brown	Australia	Ceramiche Panaria–Fiordo	DNF	
24	Scott Davis	Australia	Ceramiche Panaria–Fiordo	DNF	
25	Paolo Lanfranchi	Italy	Ceramiche Panaria–Fiordo	20	
26	Paolo Tiralongo	Italy	Ceramiche Panaria–Fiordo	DNF	
27	Luca Mazzanti	Italy	Ceramiche Panaria–Fiordo	DNF	
28	Brett Lancaster	Australia	Ceramiche Panaria–Fiordo	DNF	
29	Guillermo Bongiorno	Argentina	Ceramiche Panaria–Fiordo	DNF	
31	José Castelblanco	Colombia	Colombia–Selle Italia	37	
32	Fredy González	Colombia	Colombia–Selle Italia	35	
33	Jhon García	Colombia	Colombia–Selle Italia	DNF	
34	Ruber Marín	Colombia	Colombia–Selle Italia	85	
35	Luca De Angeli	Italy	Colombia–Selle Italia	95	
36	Hernán Muñoz	Colombia	Colombia–Selle Italia	46	
37	Rodolfo Massi	Italy	Colombia–Selle Italia	68	
38	Raffaele Illiano	Italy	Colombia–Selle Italia	66	
39	Mikhaylo Khalilov	Ukraine	Colombia–Selle Italia	DNF	
41	Serhiy Honchar	Ukraine	De Nardi-Colpack	8	
42	Andrus Aug	Estonia	De Nardi-Colpack	DNF	
43	Matteo Carrara	Italy	De Nardi-Colpack	DNF	
44	Graziano Gasparre	Italy	De Nardi-Colpack	32	
45	Leonardo Giordani	Italy	De Nardi-Colpack	90	
46	Michele Gobbi	Italy	De Nardi-Colpack	74	
47	Giuseppe Palumbo	Italy	De Nardi-Colpack	DNF	
48	Charly Wegelius	Great Britain	De Nardi-Colpack	51	
49	Leonardo Zanotti	Italy	De Nardi-Colpack	57	
51	Mario Cipollini	Italy	Domina Vacanze–Elitron	DNF	
52	Daniele Bennati	Italy	Domina Vacanze–Elitron	DNF	
53	Gabriele Colombo	Italy	Domina Vacanze–Elitron	63	
54	Giovanni Lombardi	Italy	Domina Vacanze–Elitron	70	
55	Gianpaolo Mondini	Italy	Domina Vacanze–Elitron	DNF	
56	Alberto Ongarato	Italy	Domina Vacanze–Elitron	DNF	
57	Michele Scarponi	Italy	Domina Vacanze–Elitron	16	
58	Mario Scirea	Italy	Domina Vacanze–Elitron	84	
59	Francesco Secchiari	Italy	Domina Vacanze–Elitron	96	
61	Marzio Bruseghin	Italy	Fassa Bortolo	22	
62	Dario Cioni	Italy	Fassa Bortolo	DNF	
63	Kim Kirchen	Luxembourg	Fassa Bortolo	29	
64	Dario Frigo	Italy	Fassa Bortolo	7	
65	Aitor González	Spain	Fassa Bortolo	19	
66	Alessandro Petacchi	Italy	Fassa Bortolo	DNF	
67	Matteo Tosatto	Italy	Fassa Bortolo	DNF	
68	Guido Trenti	United States	Fassa Bortolo	DNF	
69	Marco Velo	Italy	Fassa Bortolo	21	
71	Nicolas Fritsch	France	FDJeux.com	DNF	
72	Sandy Casar	France	FDJeux.com	13	
73	Jimmy Casper	France	FDJeux.com	DNF	
74	Carlos Da Cruz	France	FDJeux.com	61	
75	David Derepas	France	FDJeux.com	DNF	
76	Bernhard Eisel	Austria	FDJeux.com	64	
77	Frédéric Guesdon	France	FDJeux.com	DNF	
78	Régis Lhuillier	France	FDJeux.com	DNF	
79	Bradley Wiggins	Great Britain	FDJeux.com	DNF	
81	Elio Aggiano	Italy	Formaggi Pinzolo Fiavè	DNF	
82	Fortunato Baliani	Italy	Formaggi Pinzolo Fiavè	52	
83	Biagio Conte	Italy	Formaggi Pinzolo Fiavè	DNF	
84	Moreno Di Biase	Italy	Formaggi Pinzolo Fiavè	DNF	
85	Bo Hamburger	Denmark	Formaggi Pinzolo Fiavè	54	
86	Luis Laverde	Colombia	Formaggi Pinzolo Fiavè	30	
87	Héctor Mesa	Colombia	Formaggi Pinzolo Fiavè	77	
88	Giuseppe Muraglia	Italy	Formaggi Pinzolo Fiavè	DNF	
89	Rinaldo Nocentini	Italy	Formaggi Pinzolo Fiavè	60	
91	Daniele Contrini	Italy	Gerolsteiner	DNF	
92	Gianni Faresin	Italy	Gerolsteiner	17	
93	Robert Förster	Germany	Gerolsteiner	DNF	
94	Steffen Weigold	Germany	Gerolsteiner	DNF	
95	Uwe Hardter	Germany	Gerolsteiner	65	
96	Ronny Scholz	Germany	Gerolsteiner	DNF	
97	Marcel Strauss	Switzerland	Gerolsteiner	DNF	
98	Georg Totschnig	Austria	Gerolsteiner	5	
99	Gerhard Trampusch	Austria	Gerolsteiner	41	
101	Isaac Gálvez	Spain	Kelme–Costa Blanca	DNF	
102	Adolfo García Quesada	Spain	Kelme–Costa Blanca	18	
103	Carlos García Quesada	Spain	Kelme–Costa Blanca	DNF	
104	José Ignacio Gutiérrez	Spain	Kelme–Costa Blanca	39	
106	Jordi Riera	Spain	Kelme–Costa Blanca	93	
107	Alexis Rodríguez	Spain	Kelme–Costa Blanca	DNF	
108	Julian Usano	Spain	Kelme–Costa Blanca	87	
109	Constantino Zaballa	Spain	Kelme–Costa Blanca	27	
111	Francesco Casagrande	Italy	Lampre	DNF	
112	Sergio Barbero	Italy	Lampre	59	
113	Wladimir Belli	Italy	Lampre	11	
114	Simone Bertoletti	Italy	Lampre	88	
115	Mariano Piccoli	Italy	Lampre	DNF	
116	Manuel Quinziato	Italy	Lampre	86	
117	Raimondas Rumšas	Lithuania	Lampre	6	
118	Ján Svorada	Czech Republic	Lampre	89	
119	Francisco Vila	Spain	Lampre	44	
121	Sergey Advejev	Ukraine	Landbouwkrediet–Colnago	50	
122	Lorenzo Bernucci	Italy	Landbouwkrediet–Colnago	72	
123	Volodymyr Bileka	Ukraine	Landbouwkrediet–Colnago	58	
124	Vladimir Duma	Ukraine	Landbouwkrediet–Colnago	42	
125	Ruslan Gryschenko	Ukraine	Landbouwkrediet–Colnago	DNF	
126	Tom Stremersch	Belgium	Landbouwkrediet–Colnago	69	
127	Yaroslav Popovych	Ukraine	Landbouwkrediet–Colnago	3	
128	Salvatore Scamardella	Italy	Landbouwkrediet–Colnago	97	
129	Johan Verstrepen	Belgium	Landbouwkrediet–Colnago	94	
131	Robbie McEwen	Australia	Lotto–Domo	DNF	
132	Rik Verbrugghe	Belgium	Lotto–Domo	DNF	
133	Aart Vierhouten	Netherlands	Lotto–Domo	DNF	
134	Ief Verbrugghe	Belgium	Lotto–Domo	DNF	
135	Gert Steegmans	Belgium	Lotto–Domo	DNF	
136	Koos Moerenhout	Netherlands	Lotto–Domo	53	
137	Thierry Marichal	Belgium	Lotto–Domo	DNF	
138	Nick Gates	Australia	Lotto–Domo	DNF	
139	Kevin van Impe	Belgium	Lotto–Domo	DNF	
141	Marco Pantani	Italy	Mercatone Uno–Scanavino	14	
142	Massimo Codol	Italy	Mercatone Uno–Scanavino	15	
143	Roberto Conti	Italy	Mercatone Uno–Scanavino	56	
144	Fabiano Fontanelli	Italy	Mercatone Uno–Scanavino	91	
145	Daniel Clavero	Spain	Mercatone Uno–Scanavino	43	
146	Cristian Gasperoni	Italy	Mercatone Uno–Scanavino	45	
147	Sylwester Szmyd	Poland	Mercatone Uno–Scanavino	24	
148	Ivan Ravaioli	Italy	Mercatone Uno–Scanavino	DNF	
149	Mario Manzoni	Italy	Mercatone Uno–Scanavino	80	
151	Gilberto Simoni	Italy	Saeco	1	
152	Fabio Sacchi	Italy	Saeco	DNF	
153	Alessandro Spezialetti	Italy	Saeco	47	
154	Marius Sabaliauskas	Lithuania	Saeco	48	
155	Leonardo Bertagnolli	Italy	Saeco	25	
156	Paolo Fornaciari	Italy	Saeco	81	
157	Dario Pieri	Italy	Saeco	DNF	
158	Andrea Tonti	Italy	Saeco	55	
159	Damiano Cunego	Italy	Saeco	34	
161	Kurt Asle Arvesen	Norway	Team Fakta	DNF	
162	Jørgen Bo Petersen	Denmark	Team Fakta	DNF	
163	Frank Høj	Denmark	Team Fakta	DNF	
164	Magnus Bäckstedt	Sweden	Team Fakta	71	
165	Scott Sunderland	Australia	Team Fakta	23	
166	René Jørgensen	Denmark	Team Fakta	92	
167	Lars Bak	Denmark	Team Fakta	DNF	
168	Werner Riebenbauer	Austria	Team Fakta	DNF	
169	Julian Winn	Great Britain	Team Fakta	82	
171	Cristiano Frattini	Italy	Tenax	73	
172	Martin Hvastija	Slovenia	Tenax	DNF	
173	Crescenzo D'Amore	Italy	Tenax	DNF	
174	Sergei Lelekin	Russia	Tenax	DNF	
175	Mirko Marini	Italy	Tenax	DNF	
176	Daniele Pietropolli	Italy	Tenax	67	
177	Oscar Pozzi	Italy	Tenax	75	
178	Gianluca Tonetti	Italy	Tenax	78	
179	Mauro Zanetti	Italy	Tenax	DNF	
181	Dario Andriotto	Italy	Vini Caldirola–So.di	83	
182	Massimo Apollonio	Italy	Vini Caldirola–So.di	DNF	
183	Gabriele Balducci	Italy	Vini Caldirola–So.di	DNF	
184	Giampaolo Cheula	Italy	Vini Caldirola–So.di	62	
185	Stefano Garzelli	Italy	Vini Caldirola–So.di	2	
186	Mauro Gerosa	Italy	Vini Caldirola–So.di	79	
187	Oscar Mason	Italy	Vini Caldirola–So.di	DNF	
188	Eddy Mazzoleni	Italy	Vini Caldirola–So.di	10	
189	Steve Zampieri	Switzerland	Vini Caldirola–So.di	36	
