= 1996 Vuelta a Colombia =

Race details
- Dates: April 21 – May 5, 1996
- Stages: 14
- Distance: 1,968 km (1,223 mi)
- Winning time: 58h 42' 10"

Results
Jersey awarded to the overall winner	Winner	Miguel Ángel Sanabria (COL)	(Gaseosas Glacial-Selle Italia)
	Second	Héctor Palacio (COL)	(Gobernación de Antioquia-Pilsen)
	Third	Luis Alberto González (COL)	(Manzana Postobón)
	Points	Miguel Ángel Niño (COL)	(Todos por Boyacá)
	Mountains	Miguel Ángel Sanabria (COL)	(Gaseosas Glacial-Selle Italia)
	Combination	Jairo Hernández (COL)	(Pony Malta-Avianca)
	Team	(Colombia) Pony Malta-Kelme	

The 46th edition of the Vuelta a Colombia was held from April 21 to May 5, 1996. There were a total number of 106 competitors, including a Spanish rider, (Laudelino Cubino) and an Ecuadorian rider (Héctor Chiles). 77 cyclists finished the stage race.

== Stages ==
=== 1996-04-21: Bogotá — Colmena (5.1 km) ===
Place	Prologue		General Classification	
Place	Name	Time	Name	Time
1.	Dubán Ramírez (COL)	06.09	Dubán Ramírez (COL)	06.09

=== 1996-04-22: Chía — Duitama (183.1 km) ===
Place	Stage 1		General Classification	
Place	Name	Time	Name	Time
1.	Laudelino Cubino (ESP)	04:23.29	Dubán Ramírez (COL)	???

=== 1996-04-23: Duitama — Socorro (221.3 km) ===
Place	Stage 2		General Classification	
Place	Name	Time	Name	Time
1.	Jairo Hernández (COL)	05:06.41	Dubán Ramírez (COL)	9:36.19
2.			Javier Zapata (COL)	+0.03
3.			Raúl Montaña (COL)	+0.04

=== 1996-04-24: Socorro — Bucaramanga (120 km) ===
Place	Stage 3		General Classification	
Place	Name	Time	Name	Time
1.	Heberth Gutiérrez (COL)	03:02.40	Heberth Gutiérrez (COL)	12:39.54
2.	Javier Zapata (COL)	—	Dubán Ramírez (COL)	+0.18
3.			Javier Zapata (COL)	+0.19

=== 1996-04-25: Bucaramanga — Barrancabermeja (168 km) ===
Place	Stage 4		General Classification	
Place	Name	Time	Name	Time
1.	Héctor Palacio (COL)	03:55.23		

=== 1996-04-26: Barrancabermeja — Puerto Boyacá (202 km) ===
Place	Stage 5		General Classification	
Place	Name	Time	Name	Time
1.	Carlos Cabrera (COL)	04:39.20		

=== 1996-04-27: La Dorada — Villamaría (171.2 km) ===
Place	Stage 6		General Classification	
Place	Name	Time	Name	Time
1.	Miguel Ángel Sanabria (COL)	05:17.39		

=== 1996-04-28: Villamaría — Alto de Santa Helena (221.2 km) ===
Place	Stage 7		General Classification	
Place	Name	Time	Name	Time
1.	Luis Alberto González (COL)	05:58.22		
2.	Chepe González (COL)	+0.23		
3.	Juan Diego Ramírez (COL)	+0.23		

=== 1996-04-29: Medellín — Palestina (223.3 km) ===
Place	Stage 8		General Classification	
Place	Name	Time	Name	Time
1.	Juan Diego Ramírez (COL)	05:40.30		

=== 1996-04-30: Chinchiná — Palmira (219 km) ===
Place	Stage 9		General Classification	
Place	Name	Time	Name	Time
1.	Raúl Montaña (COL)	05:03.56		

=== 1996-05-01: Cali — Cali (17 km) ===
Place	Stage 10 (Individual Time Trial)		General Classification	
Place	Name	Time	Name	Time
1.	Elkin Barrera (COL)	00:38.21	Miguel Ángel Sanabria (COL)	43:58.46
2.	Luis Alberto González (COL)	+0.04	Luis Alberto González (COL)	+2.46
3.	Miguel Ángel Sanabria (COL)	+0.13	Elkin Barrera (COL)	+3.32

=== 1996-05-02: Buga — Córdoba (191.1 km) ===
Place	Stage 11		General Classification	
Place	Name	Time	Name	Time
1.	Hernán Buenahora (COL)	04:35.22		

=== 1996-05-03: Calarcá — Cajamarca (155 km) ===
Place	Stage 12		General Classification	
Place	Name	Time	Name	Time
1.	Julio César Aguirre (COL)	?????		

=== 1996-05-04: Ibagué — Bogotá (208 km) ===
Place	Stage 13		General Classification	
Place	Name	Time	Name	Time
1.	Héctor Palacio (COL)	05:08.22	Miguel Ángel Sanabria (COL)	57:59.48
2.			Héctor Palacio (COL)	??
3.			Luis Alberto González (COL)	??

=== 1996-05-05: Bogotá — Bogotá (26 km) ===
Place	Stage 14 (Individual Time Trial)		General Classification	
Place	Name	Time	Name	Time
1.	Carlos Alberto Contreras (COL)	00:41.35	Miguel Ángel Sanabria (COL)	58:42.10
2.	Dubán Ramírez (COL)	+0.38	Héctor Palacio (COL)	+3.11
3.	Miguel Ángel Sanabria (COL)	+0.47	Luis Alberto González (COL)	+3.13

== Final classification ==
RANK	NAME	TEAM	TIME
1.	Miguel Ángel Sanabria (COL)	Gaseosas Glacial-Selle Italia	58:42:10
2.	Héctor Palacio (COL)	Gobernación de Antioquia-Pilsen	+ 3.11
3.	Luis Alberto González (COL)	Manzana Postobón	+ 3.13
4.	Elkin Barrera (COL)	Gaseosas Glacial-Selle Italia	+ 3.50
5.	Chepe González (COL)	Pony Malta-Kelme	+ 4.21
6.	Carlos Alberto Contreras (COL)	Pony Malta-Kelme	+ 5.26
7.	Efraím Rico (COL)	Manzana Postobón	+ 5.36
8.	Germán Ospina (COL)	Gobernación de Antioquia-Pilsen	+ 5.40
9.	Jairo Hernández (COL)	Pony Malta-Avianca	+ 6.49
10.	Álvaro Lozano (COL)	Manzana Postobón	+ 7.14

== Teams ==
Pony Malta-Kelme A

1. (Colombia) Chepe González
2. (Colombia) Julio César Aguirre
3. (Spain) Laudelino Cubino
4. (Colombia) Libardo Niño
5. (Colombia) Carlos Alberto Contreras
6. (Colombia) Marco Isaías
7. (Colombia) Hernán Buenahora
8. (Colombia) José Castelblanco
9. (Colombia) Nélson Ramírez
10. (Colombia) Héctor Castaño

Gobernación de Antioquia-Pilsen

11. (Colombia) Juan Diego Ramírez
12. (Colombia) Carlos Jaramillo
13. (Colombia) Dubán Ramírez
14. (Colombia) Argiro Zapata
15. (Colombia) Héctor Palacio
16. (Colombia) Elder Herrera
17. (Colombia) Javier "El Milagroso" Zapata
18. (Colombia) Germán Ospina

Gaseosas Glacial-Selle Italia

21. (Colombia) Israel Ochoa
22. (Colombia) Elkin Barrera
23. (Colombia) Fabio Rodríguez
24. (Colombia) Miguel Ángel Sanabria
25. (Colombia) Armando Moreno
26. (Colombia) Jairo Torres
27. (Colombia) Giovanny Huertas
28. (Colombia) Víctor Becerra

Manzana Postobón A

31. (Colombia) Luis Alberto González
32. (Colombia) Luis Edgar Sepúlveda
33. (Colombia) Luis Alberto Camargo
34. (Colombia) Raúl Montaña
35. (Colombia) Álvaro Lozano
36. (Colombia) Efraím Rico
37. (Colombia) Nélson Rodríguez
38. (Colombia) Ruber Marín
39. (Colombia) Julio Ernesto Bernal
40. (Colombia) José Luis Vanegas

Pony Malta de Bavaria–Avianca A

41. (Colombia) Félix Cárdenas
42. (Colombia) Ricardo Mesa
43. (Colombia) Diego Garavito
44. (Ecuador) Héctor Chiles
45. (Colombia) Ismael Sarmiento
46. (Colombia) Jairo Hernández

Todos por Boyacá

51. (Colombia) Jair Bernal
52. (Colombia) José Ibáñez
53. (Colombia) José Castañeda
54. (Colombia) Joselín Saavedra
55. (Colombia) José Florencio Franco
56. (Colombia) Miguel Ángel Niño
57. (Colombia) Humberto Estupiñan
58. (Colombia) Luis Alfredo López
59. (Colombia) Jairo Camargo
60. (Colombia) Víctor Hugo García

Diario Deportivo–Centro Botánico El Polén

61. (Colombia) Oscar León
62. (Colombia) Armando Ospina
63. (Colombia) Eduardo Guerrero
64. (Colombia) Raúl Saavedra
65. (Colombia) Adolfo Rico
66. (Colombia) Humberto Hernández
67. (Colombia) Luis Fernando Bonilla

Estrellas–Aguardiente Néctar ELC

71. (Colombia) José A. Rodríguez
72. (Colombia) Jorge Enrique Pineda
73. (Colombia) Henry Castro
74. (Colombia) William Rodríguez
75. (Colombia) Juan Carlos Fonseca
76. (Colombia) Carlos A. Díaz
77. (Colombia) Jairo Vega

Municipal de Itagüí

81. (Colombia) Luis Eduardo Acevedo
82. (Colombia) John Restrepo
83. (Colombia) Otoniel Soto
84. (Colombia) Nélson Pérez
85. (Colombia) César Álzate
86. (Colombia) Francisco Rojas
87. (Colombia) William Valencia

Pony Malta-Kelme B

91. (Colombia) Federico Muñoz
92. (Colombia) Santiago Botero
93. (Colombia) Olmedo Capacho
94. (Colombia) Gerardo Buenahora
95. (Colombia) Óscar René Jurado
96. (Colombia) Javier Anaya

Lotería de Medellín-Aguardiente Antioqueño

101. (Colombia) Jaime Alberto Bolívar
102. (Colombia) Hernán Darío Muñoz
103. (Colombia) Hernán Osorio
104. (Colombia) Francisco Orozco
105. (Colombia) Ramón Fernando García
106. (Colombia) Leonardo Cardona

Agua Natural Glacial

111. (Colombia) Luciano Bonilla
112. (Colombia) Edward Ruiz
113. (Colombia) Urbelino Mesa
114. (Colombia) Jairo Pérez
115. (Colombia) Carlos Humberto Cabrera
116. (Colombia) Henry Alfonso Pérez
117. (Colombia) Víctor Niño

Manzana Postobón B

121. (Colombia) Óscar Giraldo
122. (Colombia) Gregorio Ladino
123. (Colombia) Alexis Rojas
124. (Colombia) Ubaldo Mesa
125. (Colombia) Luis Germán Cárdenas
126. (Colombia) César Grajales

Pony Malta de Bavaria–Avianca B

131. (Colombia) Hébert Gutiérrez
132. (Colombia) Raúl Gómez Suárez
133. (Colombia) Juan Javier Castillo
134. (Colombia) José Daniel Bernal
135. (Colombia) Carlos Silva
136. (Colombia) Carlos Andrés Osorio

Cicloases

141. (Colombia) Nélson Huérfano
142. (Colombia) Celso González
143. (Colombia) Gamaliel Parra
144. (Colombia) Juan Antonio Barrero
145. (Colombia) Miller Ñañez
146. (Colombia) Henry Pineda
147. (Colombia) Luis Ernesto Cely

== See also ==
- 1996 Clásico RCN
