= 1997 Clásico RCN =

Race details
- Dates: March 15 – March 24
- Stages: 10
- Distance: 1,482 km (920.9 mi)
- Winning time: 36h 03' 04"

Results
	Winner	Raúl Montaña (COL)	(Caprecom-Zapatos)
	Second	Javier Zapata (COL)	(Lotería de Medellín)
	Third	Héctor Palacio (COL)	(Telecom-Internet-Kelme)

The 37th edition of the annual Clásico RCN was held from March 15 to March 24, 1997, in Colombia. The stage race had an UCI rate of 2.4. RCN stands for "Radio Cadena Nacional". There were a total number of 90 competitors from 12 teams, with 71 riders actually finishing the stage race.

== Stages ==
=== 1997-03-15: Tocancipá — Villa de Leyva (149 km) ===
Place	Stage 1		General Classification	
Place	Name	Time	Name	Time
1.	Javier Zapata (COL)	????????	Raúl Montaña (COL)	????????
2.	Raúl Montaña (COL)	—	Israel Ochoa (COL)	—
3.	Israel Ochoa (COL)	—		

=== 1997-03-16: Villa de Leyva — Monguí (128 km) ===
Place	Stage 2		General Classification	
Place	Name	Time	Name	Time
1.	Raúl Montaña (COL)	03:06.40	Raúl Montaña (COL)	06:40.05
2.	Israel Ochoa (COL)	—	Libardo Niño (COL)	+0.07
3.	Libardo Niño (COL)	+0.05	Israel Ochoa (COL)	+0.14

=== 1997-03-17: Duitama — Barbosa (121 km) ===
Place	Stage 3		General Classification	
Place	Name	Time	Name	Time
1.	Víctor Becerra (COL)	02:40.26	Raúl Montaña (COL)	09:20.35
2.	Héctor Palacio (COL)	+0.07	Libardo Niño (COL)	+0.11
3.	Raúl Montaña (COL)	+0.08	Israel Ochoa (COL)	+0.18

=== 1997-03-18: Barbosa — Piedecuesta (203 km) ===
Place	Stage 4		General Classification	
Place	Name	Time	Name	Time
1.	Héctor Palacio (COL)	05:14.27	Raúl Montaña (COL)	14:34.58
2.	Javier Zapata (COL)	—	Héctor Palacio (COL)	+0.15
3.	Raúl Montaña (COL)	—	Javier Zapata (COL)	+0.23

=== 1997-03-19: Bucaramanga — Barrancabermeja (161 km) ===
Place	Stage 5		General Classification	
Place	Name	Time	Name	Time
1.	Raúl Montaña (COL)	03:45.30	Raúl Montaña (COL)	18:19.18
2.	Javier Zapata (COL)	—	Javier Zapata (COL)	+0.27
3.	Miguel Ángel Niño (COL)	—	Héctor Palacio (COL)	+0.35

=== 1997-03-20: Barrancabermeja — Puerto Boyacá (230 km) ===
Place	Stage 6		General Classification	
Place	Name	Time	Name	Time
1.	Olaf Pollack (GER)	05:18.51	Raúl Montaña (COL)	23:39.09
2.	César Goyeneche (COL)	—	Javier Zapata (COL)	+0.27
3.	Miguel Ángel Niño (COL)	—	Héctor Palacio (COL)	+0.35

=== 1997-03-21: Doradal — Guatapé (175 km) ===
Place	Stage 7		General Classification	
Place	Name	Time	Name	Time
1.	Libardo Niño (COL)	04:34.08	Raúl Montaña (COL)	28:13.15
2.	Héctor Palacio (COL)	—	Javier Zapata (COL)	+0.29
3.	Argiro Zapata (COL)	—	Héctor Palacio (COL)	+0.31

=== 1997-03-22: Rionegro — Puerto Salgar (180 km) ===
Place	Stage 8		General Classification	
Place	Name	Time	Name	Time
1.	Jairo Hernández (COL)	04:39.59	Raúl Montaña (COL)	32:54.57
2.	José Daniel Bernal (COL)	+0.01	Javier Zapata (COL)	+0.29
3.	Humberto Hernández (COL)	—	Héctor Palacio (COL)	+0.31

=== 1997-03-23: Circuito Parque Simón Bolivar, Bogotá (100 km) ===
Place	Stage 9		General Classification	
Place	Name	Time	Name	Time
1.	César Goyeneche (COL)	02:17.01	Raúl Montaña (COL)	35:11.58
2.	Steffen Blochwitz (GER)	—	Javier Zapata (COL)	+0.31
3.	Pedro Pablo Pérez (CUB)	—	Héctor Palacio (COL)	+0.33

=== 1997-03-23: Bogotá — Bogotá (35 km) ===
Place	Stage 10		General Classification	
Place	Name	Time	Name	Time
1.	Raúl Montaña (COL)	00:51.06	Raúl Montaña (COL)	36:03.04

== Final classification ==
RANK	NAME	TEAM	TIME
1.	Raúl Montaña (COL)	Caprecom-Zapatos	36:03:04
2.	Javier Zapata (COL)	Lotería de Medellín	+ 0.31
3.	Héctor Palacio (COL)	Telecom-Internet-Kelme	+ 0.33
4.	Miguel Ángel Sanabria (COL)	Todos por Boyacá	+ 0.58
5.	Juan Diego Ramírez (COL)	Telecom-Internet-Kelme	+ 1.02
6.	Carlos Contreras (COL)	Telecom-Internet-Kelme	+ 1.03
7.	Álvaro Sierra (COL)	Todos por Boyacá	+ 1.06
8.	Jair Bernal (COL)	Todos por Boyacá	+ 1.19
9.	Libardo Niño (COL)	Gaseosas Glacial-Selle Italia	+ 1.22
10.	Celio Roncancio (COL)	Bono del Ciclism	+ 1.24

== See also ==
- 1997 Vuelta a Colombia
