= 1992 Vuelta a Colombia =

Race details
- Dates: March 31 – April 12, 1992
- Stages: 12
- Distance: 1,974 km (1,227 mi)
- Winning time: 48h 36' 55"

Results
Jersey awarded to the overall winner	Winner	Fabio Parra (COL)	(Seguros Amaya)
	Second	Luis Espinosa (COL)	(Manzana Postobón)
	Third	Luis Alberto González (COL)	(Gaseosas Glacial)

The 42nd edition of the Vuelta a Colombia was held from March 31 to April 12, 1992. There were a total number of 93 competitors, including 20 foreign riders. The race started in Pereira.

== Stages ==
=== 1992-03-31: Pereira — Pereira (5.2 km) ===
Place	Prologue		General Classification	
Place	Name	Time	Name	Time
1.	Luis Herrera (COL)	00:06.26	Luis Herrera (COL)	00:06.26
2.	Luis Camargo (COL)	+0.04	Luis Camargo (COL)	+0.04
3.	Ángel Camargo (COL)	+0.06	Ángel Camargo (COL)	+0.06

=== 1992-04-01: Pereira — Palmira (196 km) ===
Place	Stage 1		General Classification	
Place	Name	Time	Name	Time
1.	Ruber Marín (COL)	04:05.44	Luis Herrera (COL)	04:12.10
2.	Roberto Gaggioli (ITA)	—	Luis Camargo (COL)	+0.04
3.	Jesús Rosado (ESP)	—	Ángel Camargo (COL)	+0.06

=== 1992-04-02: Cali — Popayán (138.4 km) ===
Place	Stage 2		General Classification	
Place	Name	Time	Name	Time
1.	Carlos Jaramillo (COL)	03:32.46	Luis Herrera (COL)	

=== 1992-04-03: Popayán — Buga (203.1 km) ===
Place	Stage 3		General Classification	
Place	Name	Time	Name	Time
1.	Roberto Gaggioli (ITA)	04:46.33	Luis Herrera (COL)	

=== 1992-04-04: Buga — Génova (163.5 km) ===
Place	Stage 4		General Classification	
Place	Name	Time	Name	Time
1.	Ángel Camargo (COL)	04:11.49	Luis Herrera (COL)	

=== 1992-04-05: Armenia — Manizales (151.2 km) ===
Place	Stage 5		General Classification	
Place	Name	Time	Name	Time
1.	Chepe González (COL)	04:00.23	Juan Carlos Rosero (ECU)	

=== 1992-04-06: Manizales — Medellín (199.3 km) ===
Place	Stage 6		General Classification	
Place	Name	Time	Name	Time
1.	Fabio Jaramillo (COL)	04:58.04	Edgar Humberto Ruiz (COL)	

=== 1992-04-07: Rionegro — La Dorada (205.8 km) ===
Place	Stage 7		General Classification	
Place	Name	Time	Name	Time
1.	Ruber Marín (COL)	04:44.48	Edgar Humberto Ruiz (COL)	

=== 1992-04-08: Honda — Ibagué (141 km) ===
Place	Stage 8		General Classification	
Place	Name	Time	Name	Time
1.	José Martín Farfán (COL)	04:00.05	Edgar Humberto Ruiz (COL)	34:29.17
2.	Luis Espinosa (COL)	+0.06	Carlos Jaramillo (COL)	+0.05
3.	Carlos Jaramillo (COL)	+0.06	Fabio Jaramillo (COL)	+0.07

=== 1992-04-09: Ibagué — Bogotá (211 km) ===
Place	Stage 9		General Classification	
Place	Name	Time	Name	Time
1.	Jair Bernal (COL)	05:17.50	Edgar Humberto Ruiz (COL)	

=== 1992-04-10: Cajicá — Duitama (173.1 km) ===
Place	Stage 10		General Classification	
Place	Name	Time	Name	Time
1.	José Ibáñez (COL)	04:20.31	Edgar Humberto Ruiz (COL)	

=== 1992-04-11: Paipa — Tunja (43 km) ===
Place	Stage 11 (Individual Time Trial)		General Classification	
Place	Name	Time	Name	Time
1.	Fabio Parra (COL)	??????	Fabio Parra (COL)	

=== 1992-04-12: Tunja — Bogotá (144.2 km) ===
Place	Stage 12		General Classification	
Place	Name	Time	Name	Time
1.	Roberto Gaggioli (ITA)	03:29.16	Fabio Parra (COL)	48:36.55

== Final classification ==
RANK	NAME	TEAM	TIME
1.	Fabio Parra (COL)	Seguros Amaya	48:36:55
2.	Luis Espinosa (COL)	Manzana Postobón	+ 0.50
3.	Luis Alberto González (COL)	Gaseosas Glacial	+ 1.17
4.	Carlos Jaramillo (COL)	Manzana Postobón	+ 1.36
5.	Juan Carlos Rosero (ECU)	Pony Malta-Avianca	+ 1.40
6.	Edgar Humberto Ruiz (COL)	Manzana Postobón	+ 2.27
7.	Augusto González (COL)	Kelme	+ 2.34
8.	Chepe González (COL)	Manzana Postobón	+ 3.13
9.	Hernán Patiño (COL)	Manzana Postobón	+ 4.26
10.	Fabio Jaramillo (COL)	Manzana Postobón	+ 4.26

== Teams ==
Manzana Postobón

1. (Colombia) Luis Herrera
2. (Colombia) Luis Camargo
3. (Colombia) Chepe González
4. (Colombia) Jorge Otálvaro
5. (Colombia) Luis Espinosa
6. (Colombia) Carlos Jaramillo
7. (Colombia) William Palacio
8. (Colombia) Ruber Marín
9. (Colombia) Fabio Jaramillo

Seguros Amaya (Spain)

11. (Colombia) Fabio Parra
12. (Colombia) Óscar Vargas
13. (Spain) Juan Romero Ruíz
14. (Spain) Juan Carlos García
15. (Spain) Juan Carlos Martín
16. (Spain) Fernando Quevedo
17. (Colombia) Humberto Parra

Kelme (Spain)

21. (Colombia) Ángel Camargo
22. (Colombia) Hernán Buenahora
23. (Spain) Juan Martínez Oliver
24. (Spain) Francisco Cabello
25. (Spain) Jesús Rosado
26. (Colombia) Pedro Saúl Morales
27. (Colombia) José Martín Farfán
28. (Colombia) Luis Felipe Moreno
29. (Colombia) Augusto González

Gaseosas Glacial

31. (Colombia) Luis Alberto González
32. (Colombia) Pablo Emilio Wilches
33. (Colombia) Miguel Ángel Sanabria
34. (Colombia) Israel Ochoa
35. (Colombia) Israel Corredor
36. (Colombia) Rubén Darío Beltrán
37. (Colombia) Santiago Amador
38. (Colombia) William Pulido
39. (Colombia) Héctor Patarroyo

Coors Light (United States)

41. (United States) Michael Engleman
42. (United States) David Former
43. (Italy) Roberto Gaggioli
44. (United States) Alexi Grewal
45. (United States) David Mann
46. (United States) Scott Moninger
47. (United States) Greg Oravetz
48. (United States) Clark Sheehan
49. (United States) Stephen Swart

Cadafé

51. (Colombia) Luciano Bonilla
52. (Venezuela) Mario Medina
53. (Colombia) Jesús Fajardo
54. (Venezuela) Omar Pumar
55. (Colombia) Wenceslao Lancheros
56. (Colombia) Julio Ernesto Bernal
57. (Venezuela) Giovanny Pabón
58. (Colombia) José Tiberio Beltrán

Pony Malta-Avianca

61. (Ecuador) Juan Carlos Rosero
62. (Colombia) Víctor Hugo Bolívar
63. (Colombia) Omar Trompa
64. (Colombia) Raúl Gómez
65. (Colombia) William Feliciano
66. (Colombia) Henry Ortíz
67. (Colombia) Jair Bernal
68. (Colombia) José Castelblanco
69. (Colombia) Julio César Aguirre

Manzana Postobón Aficionado

71. (Colombia) Libardo Niño
72. (Colombia) Edgar Humberto Ruiz
73. (Colombia) Hernán Patiño
74. (Colombia) Julio César Rangel
75. (Colombia) José Angel Robles
76. (Colombia) José Luis Vanegas
77. (Colombia) Henry Nova
78. (Colombia) Héctor Sierra
79. (Colombia) Juan Fajardo

Agua Natural Glacial

81. (Colombia) Armando Moreno
82. (Colombia) Jairo Torres
83. (Colombia) Luis Cárdenas
84. (Colombia) José Fabio Moreno
85. (Colombia) César Ramírez
86. (Colombia) Álvaro Delgado
87. (Colombia) Jaime Rincón
88. (Colombia) Heymar Espinosa
89. (Colombia) José Orlando Herrera

Lotería de Boyacá-Aguardiente Líder

91. (Colombia) Marco Carreño
92. (Colombia) Demetrio Cuspoca
93. (Colombia) Joselín Peña
94. (Colombia) Héctor Suesca
95. (Colombia) José Ibáñez
96. (Colombia) Luis Fernando Torres
97. (Colombia) Henry Pérez
98. (Colombia) Israel Gutiérrez

Pinturas Rust Oleum

101. (Colombia) Celio Roncancio
102. (Colombia) Dubán Ramírez
103. (Colombia) Álvaro Lozano
104. (Colombia) Elder Herrera
105. (Colombia) Alex Barbosa
106. (Colombia) Nélson Hernández
107. (Colombia) Jaime Bolívar
108. (Colombia) Javier Zapata
