= Vuelta a Antioquia =

Annual cycling road race in Colombia

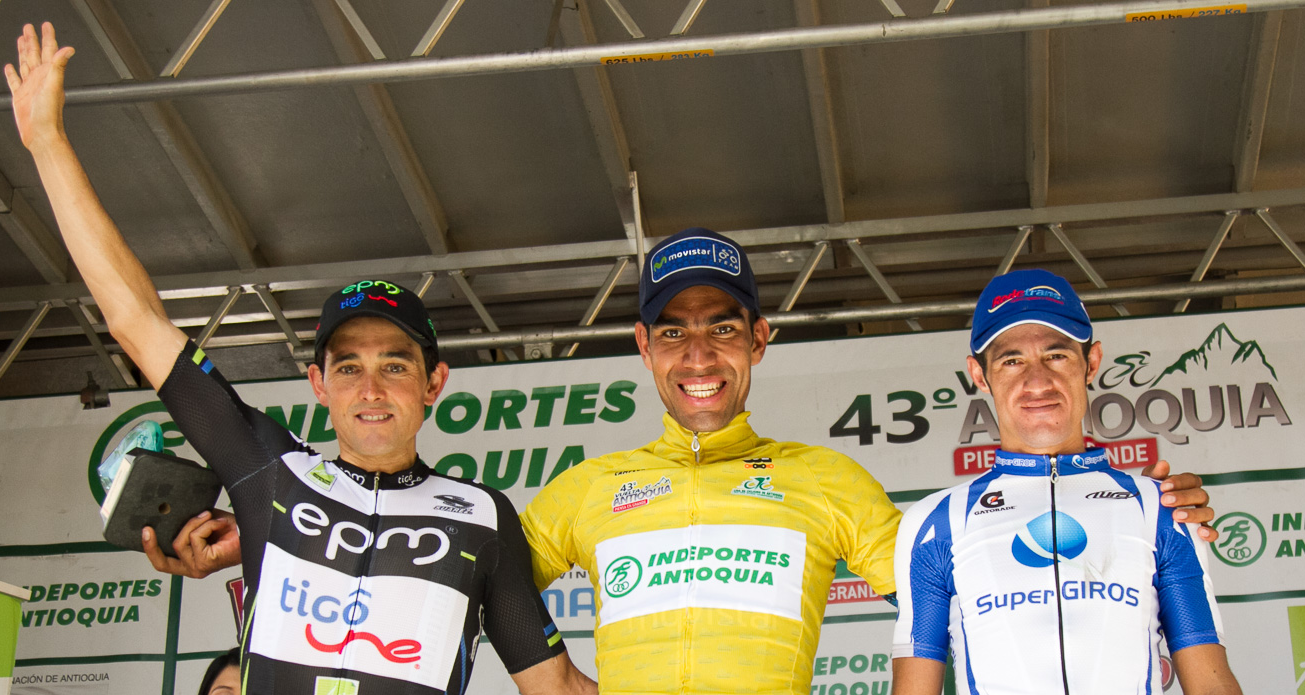
- Podium of the 2016 Vuelta a Antioquia

Race details
- Date: Varies
- Region: Antioquia Department
- English name: Tour of Antioquia
- Discipline: Road
- Type: Stage race
- Organiser: Colombian Cycling Federation

History
- First edition: 1973
- Editions: 51 (as of 2024)
- First winner: Juan de Dios Morales (COL)
- Most wins: Óscar Sevilla (ESP); Reynel Montoya (COL); (3 wins)
- Most recent: Sergio Henao (COL)

The Vuelta a Antioquia is a road cycling race held annually in the Antioquia Department of Colombia.

The first edition of the race, known as the Clásica Antioquia - Postobón, took place from 15 to 19 April 1973. Sponsored by the Postobón soft drink brand, it was organized by the Antioquia Cycling League. Sixty participants entered the race, which was divided into five stages and covered nearly 650 kilometers.

== Winners ==
Year	Winner	Second	Third
1973	(Colombia) Juan de Dios Morales	(Colombia) Guillermo Mejía	(Colombia) Héctor Cataño
1974	(Colombia) Óscar González	(Colombia) Norberto Cáceres	(Colombia) Abelardo Ríos
1976	(Colombia) Abelardo Ríos	(Colombia) Luis Manrique	(Colombia) Martín Emilio Rodríguez
1977	(Colombia) Gonzalo Marín	(Colombia) Antonio Londoño	(Colombia) Carlos Julio Siachoque
1978	(Colombia) Abelardo Ríos
1980	(Colombia) José Patrocinio Jiménez	(Colombia) Heriberto Urán	(Colombia) Alfonso Flórez Ortiz
1981	(Colombia) Julio Alberto Rubiano
1982	(Colombia) José Patrocinio Jiménez
1983	(Colombia) Reynel Montoya
1984	(Colombia) Fabio Parra	(Colombia) Martín Ramírez	(Colombia) Pacho Rodríguez
1985	(Colombia) Antonio Londoño	(Colombia) José Patrocinio Jiménez	(Colombia) Samuel Cabrera
1986	(Colombia) Reynel Montoya	(Colombia) Pedro Saúl Morales	(Colombia) Omar Hernández
1987	(Colombia) Reynel Montoya
1988	(Colombia) Pablo Wilches
1989	(Colombia) Oliverio Rincón	(Colombia) Gerardo Moncada	(Colombia) Alirio Chizabas
1990	(Colombia) Gustavo Wilches	(Colombia) Celio Roncancio	(Colombia) Pacho Rodríguez
1991	(Colombia) Álvaro Mejía	(Colombia) Óscar de Jesús Vargas	(Colombia) Luis Alberto González
1992	(Colombia) Carlos Jaramillo	(Colombia) José Luis Vanegas	(Colombia) Fabio Jaramillo
1993	(Colombia) Javier de Jesús Zapata
1994	(Colombia) Héctor Castaño
1995	(Colombia) Óscar de Jesús Vargas
1996	(Colombia) Argiro Zapata
1997	(Colombia) Germán Ospina	(Colombia) Javier de Jesús Zapata	(Colombia) Argiro Zapata
1998	(Colombia) Álvaro Sierra	(Colombia) José Castelblanco	(Colombia) Argiro Zapata
1999	(Colombia) Hernán Darío Muñoz	(Colombia) Uberlino Mesa	(Colombia) Álvaro Sierra
2000	(Colombia) Javier de Jesús Zapata	(Colombia) Daniel Rincón	(Colombia) Álvaro Sierra
2001	(Colombia) Javier de Jesús Zapata	(Colombia) Uberlino Mesa	(Colombia) Hernán Darío Bonilla
2002	(Colombia) Javier Alberto González	(Colombia) Argiro Zapata	(Colombia) Carlos Contreras
2003	(Colombia) Carlos Contreras	(Colombia) Álvaro Sierra	(Colombia) Hernán Buenahora
2004	(Colombia) José Castelblanco	(Colombia) Libardo Niño	(Colombia) Luis Ricardo Mesa
2005	(Colombia) Libardo Niño	(Colombia) Israel Ochoa	(Colombia) Jhon García
2006	(Colombia) Libardo Niño	(Colombia) Alexis Castro	(Colombia) Sergio Henao
2007	(Colombia) Mauricio Ortega	(Colombia) Hernán Buenahora	(Colombia) Sergio Henao
2008	(Colombia) Mauricio Ortega	(Colombia) Javier de Jesús Zapata	(Colombia) Edwar Ortiz
2009	(Colombia) Freddy González	(Colombia) Juan Pablo Suárez	(Colombia) Luis Felipe Laverde
2010	(Spain) Óscar Sevilla	(Colombia) Sergio Henao	(Colombia) Juan Pablo Villegas
2011	(Spain) ~~Óscar Sevilla~~	(Colombia) Sergio Henao	(Colombia) Marlon Pérez
2012	(Colombia) Alex Cano	(Colombia) Edwar Ortiz	(Colombia) Iván Parra
2013	(Spain) Óscar Sevilla	(Colombia) Alejandro Ramírez	(Colombia) Jonathan Millán
2014	(Colombia) Camilo Gómez	(Colombia) Rafael Infantino	(Colombia) Alex Cano
2015	(Spain) Óscar Sevilla	(Colombia) Juan Pablo Suárez	(Colombia) Alejandro Ramírez
2016	(Colombia) Omar Mendoza	(Colombia) Danny Osorio	(Spain) Óscar Sevilla
2017	(Colombia) Danny Osorio	(Colombia) Robinson Chalapud	(Colombia) Juan Pablo Suárez
2018	(Colombia) José Serpa	(Colombia) Aldemar Reyes	(Colombia) Juan Pablo Suárez
2019	(Colombia) Miguel Ángel Reyes	(Colombia) José Tito Hernández	(Colombia) Alexander Gil
2020	(Colombia) Alexander Gil	(Colombia) Danny Osorio	(Colombia) Freddy Montaña
2021	(Colombia) Didier Merchán	(Colombia) Didier Chaparro	(Colombia) Robinson Chalapud
2022	(Colombia) Javier Jamaica	(Colombia) Alexander Gil	(Colombia) Omar Mendoza
2023	(Colombia) Diego Pescador	(Colombia) Sebastián Castaño	(Colombia) Alexander Gil
2024	(Colombia) Sergio Henao	(Colombia) Sebastián Castaño	(Colombia) Adrián Bustamante
