= 1998 Vuelta a Colombia =

Race details
- Dates: April 25 – May 10, 1998
- Stages: 15
- Distance: 2,438.1 km (1,515 mi)
- Winning time: 61h 43' 14"

Results
Jersey awarded to the overall winner	Winner	José Castelblanco (COL)	(Telecom-Kelme)
	Second	Iván Parra (COL)	(Petróleo de Colombia)
	Third	Libardo Niño (COL)	(Aguardiente Néctar)
	Mountains	Juan Diego Ramírez (COL)	(Aguardiente Antioqueño-Lotería)
	Combination	Víctor Hugo Peña (COL)	(Telecom-Kelme)
	Team	(Colombia) Telecom-Kelme	

The 48th edition of the Vuelta a Colombia was held from April 25 to May 10, 1998. Only 68 cyclists (out of 93) completed the race.

== Stages ==
=== 1998-04-25: Villavicencio — Villavicencio (5.8 km) ===
Place	Prologue		General Classification	
Place	Name	Time	Name	Time
1.	Víctor Hugo Peña (COL)	00:06.52	Víctor Hugo Peña (COL)	00:06.52

=== 1998-04-26: Circuito del Llano (172 km) ===
Place	Stage 1		General Classification	
Place	Name	Time	Name	Time
1.	Jairo Pérez (COL)	05:38.07	Jairo Pérez (COL)	05:37.57
2.	Raúl Montaña (COL)	+4.31	Raúl Montaña (COL)	+4.37
3.	Javier Zapata (COL)	—	Fredy González (COL)	+4.38

=== 1998-04-27: Villavicencio — Cáqueza (147 km) ===
Place	Stage 2		General Classification	
Place	Name	Time	Name	Time
1.	Josef Lontscharitsch (AUT)	03:58.26	Jairo Pérez (COL)	09:37.14
2.	Ariel Martínez (COL)	—	Josef Lontscharitsch (AUT)	+3.37
3.	Juan Diego Ramírez (COL)	+0.29	Ariel Martínez (COL)	+3.42

=== 1998-04-28: Funza — Girardot (131 km) ===
Place	Stage 3		General Classification	
Place	Name	Time	Name	Time
1.	Fredy González (COL)	02:35.54	Jairo Pérez (COL)	12:13.08
2.	Raúl Montaña (COL)	—	Josef Lontscharitsch (AUT)	+3.36
3.	Javier Zapata (COL)	—	Ariel Martínez (COL)	+3.43

=== 1998-04-29: Girardot — Neiva (172 km) ===
Place	Stage 4		General Classification	
Place	Name	Time	Name	Time
1.	Eduardo Hernández (ESP)	04:17.12	Jairo Pérez (COL)	16:30.37
2.	Rafael Brand (COL)	—	Josef Lontscharitsch (AUT)	+3.35
3.	Raúl Montaña (COL)	+0.29	Ariel Martínez (COL)	+3.43

=== 1998-04-30: Neiva — Ibagué (208 km) ===
Place	Stage 5		General Classification	
Place	Name	Time	Name	Time
1.	Javier Pascual (ESP)	04:10.26	Jairo Pérez (COL)	21:45.02
2.	Félix Cárdenas (COL)	—	Javier Pascual (ESP)	+0.14
3.	Raúl Montaña (COL)	+3.59	Josef Lontscharitsch (AUT)	+3.35

=== 1998-05-01: Circuito del Café — Calle (144 km) ===
Place	Stage 6		General Classification	
Place	Name	Time	Name	Time
1.	Víctor Hugo Peña (COL)	03:07.07	Jairo Pérez (COL)	24:52.14
2.	Jairo Hernández (COL)	+0.03	Javier Pascual (ESP)	+1.17
3.	Gregorio Ladino (COL)	—	Ariel Martínez (COL)	+3.43

=== 1998-05-02: Santa Rosa de Cabal — Alto de Santa Helena (229 km) ===
Place	Stage 7		General Classification	
Place	Name	Time	Name	Time
1.	Jairo Pérez (COL)	05:38.07	Jairo Pérez (COL)	30:20.21
2.	Raúl Montaña (COL)	+4.31	Raúl Montaña (COL)	+4.37
3.	Javier Zapata (COL)	—	Fredy González (COL)	+4.38

=== 1998-05-03: Medellín — Manizales (195 km) ===
Place	Stage 8		General Classification	
Place	Name	Time	Name	Time
1.	José Castelblanco (COL)	06:25.05	José Castelblanco (COL)	37:27.00
2.	Juan Diego Ramírez (COL)	+0.32	Juan Diego Ramírez (COL)	+1.41
3.	Iván Parra (COL)	+0.35	Iván Parra (COL)	+1.57

=== 1998-05-04: Manizales — Dorada (177 km) ===
Place	Stage 9		General Classification	
Place	Name	Time	Name	Time
1.	Víctor Becerra (COL)	04:44.04	José Castelblanco (COL)	42:11.09
2.	Víctor Hugo Peña (COL)	+0.05	Juan Diego Ramírez (COL)	+1.41
3.	Carlos Contreras (COL)	—	Iván Parra (COL)	+1.57

=== 1998-05-05: Puerto Boyacá — Barrancabermeja (202 km) ===
Place	Stage 10		General Classification	
Place	Name	Time	Name	Time
1.	Raúl Montaña (COL)	05:48.54	José Castelblanco (COL)	48:00.03
2.	Ruber Marín (COL)	—	Juan Diego Ramírez (COL)	+1.41
3.	Josef Lontscharitsch (AUT)	—	Iván Parra (COL)	+1.57

=== 1998-05-06: Barrancabermeja — Bucaramanga (124 km) ===
Place	Stage 11		General Classification	
Place	Name	Time	Name	Time
1.	José Castelblanco (COL)	03:08.43	José Castelblanco (COL)	51:08.37
2.	Víctor Hugo Peña (COL)	+4.50	Juan Diego Ramírez (COL)	+6.49
3.	Alexis Rojas (COL)	+4.52	Iván Parra (COL)	+7.06

=== 1998-05-07: Bucaramanga — Barichara (148.7 km) ===
Place	Stage 12		General Classification	
Place	Name	Time	Name	Time
1.	Héctor Palacio (COL)	03:56.20	José Castelblanco (COL)	54:49.40
2.	Israel Ochoa (COL)	—	Juan Diego Ramírez (COL)	+6.49
3.	Víctor Hugo Peña (COL)	—	Héctor Palacio (COL)	+6.58

=== 1998-05-08: Barbosa — Duitama (138.9 km) ===
Place	Stage 13		General Classification	
Place	Name	Time	Name	Time
1.	Jairo Hernández (COL)	03:43.34	José Castelblanco (COL)	58:33.14
2.	Libardo Niño (COL)	—	Juan Diego Ramírez (COL)	+6.49
3.	Alexis Rojas (COL)	—	Héctor Palacio (COL)	+7.03

=== 1998-05-09: Paipa — Tunja (43.5 km) ===
Place	Stage 14 (Individual Time Trial)		General Classification	
Place	Name	Time	Name	Time
1.	José Castelblanco (COL)	01:01.40	José Castelblanco (COL)	59:34.54
2.	Dubán Ramírez (COL)	+0.44	Iván Parra (COL)	+8.13
3.	Iván Parra (COL)	+0.57	Libardo Niño (COL)	+10.25

=== 1998-05-10: Circuito en Bogotá (104 km) ===
Place	Stage 15		General Classification	
Place	Name	Time	Name	Time
1.	Fredy González (COL)	02:08.20	José Castelblanco (COL)	61:43.42
2.	Libardo Niño (COL)	—	Iván Parra (COL)	+8.13
3.	Javier Anaya (COL)	—	Libardo Niño (COL)	+10.21

== Final classification ==
RANK	NAME	TEAM	TIME
1.	José Castelblanco (COL)	Telecom-Kelme	61:43:14
2.	Iván Parra (COL)	Petróleo de Colombia	+ 8.13
3.	Libardo Niño (COL)	Aguardiente Néctar	+ 10.21
4.	Israel Ochoa (COL)	Lotería de Boyacá	+ 10.44
5.	Juan Diego Ramírez (COL)	Lotería de Medellín-EPM	+ 11.06
6.	Miguel Ángel Sanabria (COL)	Lotería de Boyacá	+ 11.34
7.	Héctor Palacio (COL)	Aguardiente Antioqueño	+ 11.39
8.	Víctor Hugo Peña (COL)	Telecom-Kelme	+ 12.40
9.	Argiro Zapata (COL)	Lotería de Medellín-EPM	+ 12.50
10.	Alexis Rojas (COL)	Petróleo de Colombia	+ 12.52

== Teams ==
Telecom — Kelme

1. (Colombia) José Castelblanco
2. (Colombia) Julio César Aguirre
3. (Colombia) Víctor Hugo Peña
4. (Colombia) Jairo Hernández
5. (Colombia) Ricardo Mesa
6. (Colombia) Elder Herrera
7. (Colombia) Federico Muñoz
8. (Colombia) Hernán Bonilla
9. (Colombia) Carlos Osorio
10. (Colombia) Olmedo Capacho

Petróleos de Colombia — Energía Pura

11. (Colombia) Álvaro Sierra
12. (Colombia) Iván Parra
13. (Colombia) Celio Roncancio
14. (Colombia) Alexis Rojas
15. (Colombia) Nélson Rodríguez
16. (Colombia) Gregorio Ladino
17. (Colombia) Raúl Gómez Suárez
18. (Colombia) Ruber Marín
19. (Colombia) Julio César Rangel
20. (Colombia) Félix Cárdenas

Kelme Costa Blanca — Eurosport

21. (Spain) José Santos González
22. (Spain) Daniel Ribera
23. (Spain) Severo Rodríguez
24. (Spain) Eduardo Hernández
26. (Spain) Francisco Cabello
27. (Spain) Juan José de los Ángeles
28. (Colombia) Carlos Contreras

Aguardiente Antioqueño — Lotería de Medellín

31. (Colombia) Héctor Palacio
32. (Colombia) Juan Diego Ramírez
33. (Colombia) Hernán Darío Muñoz
34. (Colombia) Argiro Zapata
35. (Colombia) Dubán Ramírez
36. (Colombia) Ariel Martínez
37. (Colombia) Héctor Castaño
38. (Colombia) Ramón García
39. (Colombia) Germán Ospina
40. (Colombia) Francisco Orozco

Ciclistas de Jesucristo

41. (Colombia) Julio Bernal
42. (Colombia) Henry Castro
43. (Colombia) Carlos Díaz
44. (Colombia) José Ignacio Rodríguez
45. (Colombia) Juan Barrero
46. (Colombia) Guillermo Chaparro
47. (Colombia) Bernardo Pedraza
48. (Colombia) Rafael Brand
49. (Colombia) Carlos Saavedra

Aguardiente Néctar

51. (Colombia) Raúl Montaña
52. (Colombia) Libardo Niño
53. (Colombia) José Luis Vanegas
54. (Colombia) Elkin Barrera
55. (Colombia) Fredy González
56. (Colombia) Juan Fonseca
57. (Colombia) Edward Ruiz
58. (Colombia) Freddy Moncada
59. (Colombia) Miguel Ángel Niño
60. (Colombia) Juan Alberto Robayo

Estampados Panamericanos — Distrillantas

61. (Colombia) Andrés Álvis
62. (Colombia) Alejandro Rodríguez
63. (Colombia) Darío Cedano
64. (Colombia) Henry Pineda
65. (Colombia) Heberth Gutiérrez
66. (Colombia) Asdrúbal Patiño

Cicloases

71. (Colombia) Leonel Jiménez
72. (Colombia) Freddy Rincón
73. (Colombia) José Carrillo
74. (Colombia) Javier Arcila
75. (Colombia) Otoniel Soto
76. (Austria) Josef Lontscharitsch

Aguardiente Néctar — Ron Santafé

81. (Colombia) Israel Ochoa
82. (Colombia) Miguel Ángel Sanabria
83. (Colombia) Luis Espinosa
84. (Colombia) Ángel Camargo
85. (Colombia) Víctor Becerra
86. (Colombia) Ismael Sarmiento
87. (Colombia) Graciano Fonseca
88. (Colombia) Jairo Pérez
89. (Colombia) Giovanny Huertas
90. (Colombia) Daniel Rincón

Lotería de Santander — Mixto Telecom

91. (Colombia) Jair Bernal
92. (Colombia) Javier Zapata
93. (Colombia) Álvaro Lozano
94. (Colombia) Nélson Ramírez
95. (Colombia) Óscar Jurado
96. (Colombia) Raúl Saavedra
97. (Colombia) Javier Anaya
98. (Colombia) Jaime Pinzón
99. (Colombia) José David Suárez

Flavia — Meta — Alcaldía de Cómbita

101. (Slovakia) Milan Dvorščík
102. (Spain) Javier Pascual
103. (Spain) Francisco León
104. (Colombia) Jairzinho Gutiérrez
105. (Colombia) Néstor Bernal
106. (Colombia) José Florencio Franco

== See also ==
- 1998 Clásico RCN
