= 1998 Clásico RCN =

Race details
- Dates: August 14 – August 23
- Stages: 9
- Distance: 1,474.8 km (916.4 mi)
- Winning time: 35h 18' 58"

Results
	Winner	Raúl Montaña (COL)	(Aguardiente Néctar)
	Second	Argiro Zapata (COL)	(Lotería de Medellín)
	Third	Israel Ochoa (COL)	(Lotería de Boyacá)
	Points	Eduardo Graciano (MEX)	(México-Cervecería)
	Mountains	Raúl Montaña (COL)	(Aguardiente Néctar)
	Combination	Raúl Montaña (COL)	(Aguardiente Néctar)
	Team	(Colombia) Empresas Públicas de Medellín	

The 38th edition of the annual Clásico RCN, a bicycle stage race, was held from August 14 to August 23, 1998, in Colombia. The race with an UCI rate of 2.4 started in Barrancabermeja and finished in Bogotá with an individual time trial. RCN stands for "Radio Cadena Nacional" – one of the oldest and largest radio networks in the nation. There were a total of 95 competitors from 13 teams, with 81 cyclists actually finishing the stage race.

== Stages ==
=== 1998-08-14: Barrancabermeja (6.8 km) ===
Place	Prologue		General Classification	
Place	Name	Time	Name	Time
1.	Israel Ochoa (COL)	00:07.51	Israel Ochoa (COL)	00:07.51
2.	Raúl Montaña (COL)	+0.06	Raúl Montaña (COL)	+0.06
3.	Dubán Ramírez (COL)	+0.08	Dubán Ramírez (COL)	+0.08

=== 1998-08-15: Barrancabermeja — Puerto Boyacá (228 km) ===
Place	Stage 1		General Classification	
Place	Name	Time	Name	Time
1.	Jairo Vega (COL)	05:34.16	Carlos Saavedra (COL)	05:43.30
2.	Carlos Saavedra (COL)	—	Jairo Vega (COL)	+0.24
3.	Raúl Montaña (COL)	+4.38	Israel Ochoa (COL)	+3.15

=== 1998-08-16: Puerto Berrio — Bello (180 km) ===
Place	Stage 2		General Classification	
Place	Name	Time	Name	Time
1.	Hernán Darío Muñoz (COL)	04:50.14	Hernán Darío Muñoz (COL)	10:37.11
2.	Víctor Becerra (COL)	—	Julio Ernesto Bernal (COL)	+0.10
3.	Félix Cárdenas (COL)	—	Félix Cárdenas (COL)	+0.13

=== 1998-08-17: Sabaneta — Jardín (124 km) ===
Place	Stage 3		General Classification	
Place	Name	Time	Name	Time
1.	Argiro Zapata (COL)	03:09.34	Oved Ramírez (COL)	13:47.25
2.	Daniel Rincón (COL)	+0.13	Hernán Darío Muñoz (COL)	+0.07
3.	Oved Ramírez (COL)	—	Argiro Zapata (COL)	+0.08

=== 1998-08-18: Jardín — Chinchiná (216.6 km) ===
Place	Stage 4		General Classification	
Place	Name	Time	Name	Time
1.	Libardo Niño (COL)	05:14.44	Oved Ramírez (COL)	19:02.09
2.	Waldo Meza (COL)	+0.09	Hernán Darío Muñoz (COL)	+0.07
3.	Ruber Marín (COL)	+1.03	Argiro Zapata (COL)	+0.08

=== 1998-08-19: Roldanillo — Buenaventura (208 km) ===
Place	Stage 5		General Classification	
Place	Name	Time	Name	Time
1.	Raúl Montaña (COL)	04:27.54	Oved Ramírez (COL)	23:30.36
2.	Elder Herrera (COL)	—	Hernán Darío Muñoz (COL)	+0.07
3.	Félix Cárdenas (COL)	—	Argiro Zapata (COL)	+0.08

=== 1998-08-20: Buenaventura — Pradera (187 km) ===
Place	Stage 6		General Classification	
Place	Name	Time	Name	Time
1.	Dubán Ramírez (COL)	04:26.07	Oved Ramírez (COL)	27:56.43
2.	Ruber Marín (COL)	+0.01	Hernán Darío Muñoz (COL)	+0.07
3.	Fredy González (COL)	—	Argiro Zapata (COL)	+0.08

=== 1998-08-21: Guacarí — Armenia (137 km) ===
Place	Stage 7		General Classification	
Place	Name	Time	Name	Time
1.	Raúl Montaña (COL)	03:00.57	Oved Ramírez (COL)	30:57.44
2.	Israel Ochoa (COL)	+0.04	Hernán Darío Muñoz (COL)	+0.07
3.	Ruber Marín (COL)	—	Argiro Zapata (COL)	+0.08

=== 1998-08-22: Armenia — Espinal (151 km) ===
Place	Stage 8		General Classification	
Place	Name	Time	Name	Time
1.	Raúl Montaña (COL)	03:44.22	Oved Ramírez (COL)	34:42.09
2.	Ruber Marín (COL)	—	Hernán Darío Muñoz (COL)	+0.07
3.	Israel Ochoa (COL)	—	Argiro Zapata (COL)	+0.08

=== 1998-08-23: Palacio Presidencial, Bogotá — Alto de Patios, Bogotá (22.1 km) ===
Place	Stage 9 (Individual Time Trial)		General Classification	
Place	Name	Time	Name	Time
1.	Álvaro Sierra (COL)	00:36.17	Raúl Montaña (COL)	35:18.58
2.	Raúl Montaña (COL)	+0.08	Argiro Zapata (COL)	+0.07
3.	Israel Ochoa (COL)	+0.20	Israel Ochoa (COL)	+0.24

== Final classification ==
RANK	NAME	TEAM	TIME
1.	Raúl Montaña (COL)	Aguardiente Néctar	35:18:58
2.	Argiro Zapata (COL)	Lotería de Medellín	+ 0.08
3.	Israel Ochoa (COL)	Telecom-Internet-Kelme	+ 0.24
4.	Oved Ramírez (COL)	Lotería de Medellín	+ 0.29
5.	Álvaro Sierra (COL)	Automotriz Carrera	+ 0.39
6.	Félix Cárdenas (COL)	Automotriz Carrera	+ 0.54
7.	Dubán Ramírez (COL)	Todos por Boyacá	+ 1.14
8.	Daniel Rincón (COL)	Lotería de Boyacá	+ 1.24
9.	Miguel Ángel Sanabria (COL)	Lotería de Boyacá	+ 1.28
10.	Héctor Castaño (COL)	Lotería de Medellín	+ 1.57

== See also ==
- 1998 Vuelta a Colombia
