= 1999 Vuelta a Colombia =

Race details
- Dates: June 13–27, 1999
- Stages: 15
- Distance: 2,300 km (1,429 mi)
- Winning time: 51h 38' 19"

Results
| Jersey awarded to the overall winner | Winner | Carlos Alberto Contreras (COL) | (Kelme-Costa Blanca) |
| | Second | Alexis Rojas (COL) | (Aguardiente Cristal-Chec) |
| | Third | Félix Cárdenas (COL) | (Lotería de Santander) |
| | Mountains | Félix Cárdenas (COL) | (Lotería de Santander) |
| | Combination | Carlos Alberto Contreras (COL) | (Kelme-Costa Blanca) |
| | Team | (Colombia) Aguardiente Néctar | |

The 49th edition of the Vuelta a Colombia was held from June 13 to June 27, 1999.

== Stages ==
=== 1999-06-13: Circuito en Manizales (120 km) ===
| Place | Stage 1 | | General Classification | |
| Place | Name | Time | Name | Time |
|---|---|---|---|---|
| 1. | Javier Zapata (COL) | 2:48.25 | Javier Zapata (COL) | 2:48.25 |
| 2. | Carlos Alberto Contreras (COL) | — | Carlos Alberto Contreras (COL) | +0.04 |
| 3. | Alexis Rojas (COL) | — | Alexis Rojas (COL) | +0.06 |

=== 1999-06-14: Manizales — Pereira (102.3 km) ===
| Place | Stage 2 | | General Classification | |
| Place | Name | Time | Name | Time |
|---|---|---|---|---|
| 1. | Javier Pascual (ESP) | 2:13.03 | Javier Pascual (ESP) | 5:01.16 |
| 2. | Ruber Marín (COL) | — | Carlos Alberto Contreras (COL) | +0.02 |
| 3. | Carlos Alberto Contreras (COL) | — | Javier Zapata (COL) | +0.02 |

=== 1999-06-15: Armenia — Cali (179.3 km) ===
| Place | Stage 3 | | General Classification | |
| Place | Name | Time | Name | Time |
|---|---|---|---|---|
| 1. | Ruber Marín (COL) | 4:13.00 | Ruber Marín (COL) | 9:14.11 |
| 2. | Carlos Alberto Contreras (COL) | +0.01 | Carlos Alberto Contreras (COL) | +0.01 |
| 3. | Yosvany Falcón (CUB) | +0.01 | Javier Pascual (ESP) | +0.05 |

=== 1999-06-16: Cali — Cartago (181.7 km) ===
| Place | Stage 4 | | General Classification | |
| Place | Name | Time | Name | Time |
|---|---|---|---|---|
| 1. | Fredy González (COL) | 4:17.25 | Alexis Rojas (COL) | 13:31.43 |
| 2. | Alexis Rojas (COL) | — | Fredy González (COL) | — |
| 3. | Ricardo Mesa (COL) | — | Víctor Niño (COL) | +0.10 |

=== 1999-06-17: Cartago — La Pintada (164.6 km) ===
| Place | Stage 5 | | General Classification | |
| Place | Name | Time | Name | Time |
|---|---|---|---|---|
| 1. | Raúl Montaña (COL) | 3:49.58 | Alexis Rojas (COL) | 17:21.01 |
| 2. | Jhon García (COL) | — | Fredy González (COL) | — |
| 3. | Alessio Girelli (ITA) | — | Víctor Niño (COL) | +0.10 |

=== 1999-06-18: Santa Fé de Antioquia — Alto del Toyó (78 km) ===
| Place | Stage 6 | | General Classification | |
| Place | Name | Time | Name | Time |
|---|---|---|---|---|
| 1. | Héctor Palacio (COL) | 2:49.54 | Alexis Rojas (COL) | 17:21.01 |
| 2. | Félix Cárdenas (COL) | +0.10 | Fredy González (COL) | — |
| 3. | Hernán Bonilla (COL) | +0.12 | Víctor Niño (COL) | +0.10 |

=== 1999-06-19: Santa Fé de Antioquia — Edificio Inteligente (150 km) ===
| Place | Stage 7 | | General Classification | |
| Place | Name | Time | Name | Time |
|---|---|---|---|---|
| 1. | Chepe González (COL) | 4:23.49 | Alexis Rojas (COL) | 24:38.56 |
| 2. | Dubán Ramírez (COL) | — | Víctor Niño (COL) | +0.10 |
| 3. | Elder Herrera (COL) | +1.12 | Ricardo Mesa (COL) | +0.37 |

=== 1999-06-20: Medellín — Medellín (31.5 km) ===
| Place | Stage 8 (Individual Time Trial) | | General Classification | |
| Place | Name | Time | Name | Time |
|---|---|---|---|---|
| 1. | Dubán Ramírez (COL) | 41.16 | Dubán Ramírez (COL) | 25:21.38 |
| 2. | Carlos Alberto Contreras (COL) | +0.24 | Víctor Niño (COL) | +0.42 |
| 3. | Javier Zapata (COL) | +1.17 | Alexis Rojas (COL) | +1.10 |

=== 1999-06-21: Bello — Puerto Berrío (177.4 km) ===
| Place | Stage 9 | | General Classification | |
| Place | Name | Time | Name | Time |
|---|---|---|---|---|
| 1. | Carlos Alberto Contreras (COL) | 4:02.31 | Dubán Ramírez (COL) | 29:24.09 |
| 2. | Félix Cárdenas (COL) | — | Víctor Niño (COL) | +0.42 |
| 3. | Ruber Marín (COL) | — | Carlos Alberto Contreras (COL) | +1.07 |

=== 1999-06-22: Puerto Berrío — Barrancabermeja (159.8 km) ===
| Place | Stage 10 | | General Classification | |
| Place | Name | Time | Name | Time |
|---|---|---|---|---|
| 1. | Jairo Pérez (COL) | 3:35.17 | Víctor Niño (COL) | 33:03.16 |
| 2. | Julio Ernesto Bernal (COL) | +0.47 | Carlos Alberto Contreras (COL) | +0.25 |
| 3. | Germán Ospina (COL) | +0.48 | Alexis Rojas (COL) | +0.28 |

=== 1999-06-23: Barrancabermeja — Bucaramanga (124.2 km) ===
| Place | Stage 11 | | General Classification | |
| Place | Name | Time | Name | Time |
|---|---|---|---|---|
| 1. | Federico Muñoz (COL) | 3:03.47 | Carlos Alberto Contreras (COL) | 36:07.24 |
| 2. | Israel Ochoa (COL) | — | Alexis Rojas (COL) | +0.07 |
| 3. | Carlos Alberto Contreras (COL) | — | Ricardo Mesa (COL) | +0.52 |

=== 1999-06-24: Bucaramanga — Barichara (148.7 km) ===
| Place | Stage 12 | | General Classification | |
| Place | Name | Time | Name | Time |
|---|---|---|---|---|
| 1. | Miguel Ángel Sanabria (COL) | 3:43.05 | Carlos Alberto Contreras (COL) | 39:51.08 |
| 2. | Argiro Zapata (COL) | — | Alexis Rojas (COL) | +0.13 |
| 3. | Félix Cárdenas (COL) | +0.02 | Félix Cárdenas (COL) | +0.28 |

=== 1999-06-25: San Gil — Tunja (188.3 km) ===
| Place | Stage 13 | | General Classification | |
| Place | Name | Time | Name | Time |
|---|---|---|---|---|
| 1. | Israel Ochoa (COL) | 5:21.55 | Carlos Alberto Contreras (COL) | 45:13.06 |
| 2. | Carlos Alberto Contreras (COL) | +0.03 | Alexis Rojas (COL) | +0.20 |
| 3. | Alexis Rojas (COL) | +0.08 | Félix Cárdenas (COL) | +0.44 |

=== 1999-06-26: Tunja — Zipaquirá (171.8 km) ===
| Place | Stage 14 | | General Classification | |
| Place | Name | Time | Name | Time |
|---|---|---|---|---|
| 1. | Raúl Montaña (COL) | 4:07.03 | Carlos Alberto Contreras (COL) | 49:22.02 |
| 2. | Ramón García (COL) | +0.01 | Alexis Rojas (COL) | +0.20 |
| 3. | Ismael Sarmiento (COL) | +0.03 | Félix Cárdenas (COL) | +0.44 |

=== 1999-06-27: Circuito en Bogotá (100.8 km) ===
| Place | Stage 15 | | General Classification | |
| Place | Name | Time | Name | Time |
|---|---|---|---|---|
| 1. | Raúl Montaña (COL) | 2:14.12 | Carlos Alberto Contreras (COL) | 51:38.19 |
| 2. | Libardo Niño (COL) | +0.39 | Alexis Rojas (COL) | +0.20 |
| 3. | Elder Herrera (COL) | — | Félix Cárdenas (COL) | +0.44 |

== Final classification ==
| RANK | NAME | TEAM | TIME |
|---|---|---|---|
| 1. | Carlos Alberto Contreras (COL) | Kelme-Costa Blanca | 51:38:19 |
| 2. | Alexis Rojas (COL) | Aguardiente Cristal-Chec | + 0.20 |
| 3. | Félix Cárdenas (COL) | Lotería de Santander | + 0.44 |
| 4. | Ricardo Mesa (COL) | Nacional Orbitel | + 1.11 |
| 5. | Israel Ochoa (COL) | Aguardiente Néctar | + 1.12 |
| 6. | Héctor Castaño (COL) | Nacional Orbitel | + 2.00 |
| 7. | Álvaro Sierra (COL) | Aguardiente Néctar | + 2.14 |
| 8. | Argiro Zapata (COL) | Empresas Públicas de Medellín | + 2.57 |
| 9. | Víctor Niño (COL) | Lotería de Boyacá | + 3.05 |
| 10. | Julio César Aguirre (COL) | Nacional Orbitel | + 3.11 |

== See also ==
- 1999 Clásico RCN
