= 1993 Vuelta a Colombia =

Race details
- Dates: March 20 – April 4, 1993
- Stages: 16
- Distance: 2,322 km (1,443 mi)
- Winning time: 61h 09' 54"

Results
Jersey awarded to the overall winner	Winner	Carlos Jaramillo (COL)	(Lotería de Medellín)
	Second	Edgar Humberto Ruiz (COL)	(Manzana Postobón)
	Third	Israel Ochoa (COL)	(Gaseosas Glacial)
	Points	Ruber Marín (COL)	(Manzana Postobón)
	Mountains	Chepe González (COL)	(Manzana Postobón)
	Youth	Javier Sánchez (COL)	(Lotería de Nariño)
	Combination	Carlos Jaramillo (COL)	(Lotería de Medellín)
	Team	(Colombia) Manzana Postobón	

The 43rd edition of the Vuelta a Colombia was held from March 20 to April 4, 1993. There were a total number of 102 competitors, including 26 foreign riders. The race started in Ecuador.

== Stages ==
=== 1993-03-20: Tulcán (Ecuador) — Ipiales (11.5 km) ===
Place	Stage 1		General Classification	
Place	Name	Time	Name	Time
1.	Libardo Niño (COL)	16.24	Libardo Niño (COL)	16.24

=== 1993-03-21: Tulcán (Ecuador) — Pasto (95.4 km) ===
Place	Stage 2		General Classification	
Place	Name	Time	Name	Time
1.	Gerardo Moncada (COL)	02:34.18		

=== 1993-03-22: Pasto — El Bordo (165.8 km) ===
Place	Stage 3		General Classification	
Place	Name	Time	Name	Time
1.	Jorge Otálvaro (COL)	04:04.51		

=== 1993-03-23: Popayán — Palmira (153.5 km) ===
Place	Stage 4		General Classification	
Place	Name	Time	Name	Time
1.	Omar Trompa (COL)	03:49.36		

=== 1993-03-24: Cali — Pereira (219.2 km) ===
Place	Stage 5		General Classification	
Place	Name	Time	Name	Time
1.	Ruber Marín (COL)	05:25.53		

=== 1993-03-25: Santa Rosa de Cabal — Medellín (202.5 km) ===
Place	Stage 6		General Classification	
Place	Name	Time	Name	Time
1.	Santiago Amador (COL)	05:32.09		

=== 1993-03-26: Itagüí — Manizales (188.5 km) ===
Place	Stage 7		General Classification	
Place	Name	Time	Name	Time
1.	Carlos Jaramillo (COL)	05:29.26		

=== 1993-03-27: Manizales — Ibagué (216.6 km) ===
Place	Stage 8		General Classification	
Place	Name	Time	Name	Time
1.	Hernán Patiño (COL)	05:32.37	Pedro Rodríguez (ECU)	32:48.55
2.	Dubán Ramírez (COL)	+01.17	Carlos Jaramillo (COL)	+00.03
3.	Gerardo Moncada (COL)	+01.57	Luis Alberto González (COL)	+00.20

=== 1993-03-28: Ibagué — Bogotá (212.6 km) ===
Place	Stage 9		General Classification	
Place	Name	Time	Name	Time
1.	Libardo Niño (COL)	04:24.19		

=== 1993-03-29: Sopó — Duitama (176.3 km) ===
Place	Stage 10		General Classification	
Place	Name	Time	Name	Time
1.	Ruber Marín (COL)	04:02.22		

=== 1993-03-30: Tunja — San Gil (191.8 km) ===
Place	Stage 11		General Classification	
Place	Name	Time	Name	Time
1.	Néstor Mora (COL)	03:31.33		

=== 1993-03-31: San Gil — Bucaramanga (100.2 km) ===
Place	Stage 12		General Classification	
Place	Name	Time	Name	Time
1.	Javier Zapata (COL)	02:37.05		

=== 1993-04-01: Bucaramanga — Pamplona (129 km) ===
Place	Stage 13		General Classification	
Place	Name	Time	Name	Time
1.	Juan Carlos Rosero (ECU)	03:59.37		

=== 1993-04-02: Pamplona — San Cristóbal (126 km) ===
Place	Stage 14		General Classification	
Place	Name	Time	Name	Time
1.	Jorge Otálvaro (COL)	02:59.45		

=== 1993-04-03: Cúcuta — Chinácota (40.4 km) ===
Place	Stage 15 (Individual Time Trial)		General Classification	
Place	Name	Time	Name	Time
1.	Libardo Niño (COL)	???		

=== 1993-04-04: Circuito Cúcuta (120.9 km) ===
Place	Stage 16		General Classification	
Place	Name	Time	Name	Time
1.	Raúl Acosta (COL)	03:08.25	Carlos Jaramillo (COL)	61:09.54
2.	Juan Carlos Arias (COL)	—	Edgar Humberto Ruiz (COL)	+00.31
3.	Javier Zapata (COL)	—	Israel Ochoa (COL)	+00.46

== Final classification ==
RANK	NAME	TEAM	TIME
1.	Carlos Jaramillo (COL)	Lotería de Medellín	61:09:54
2.	Edgar Humberto Ruiz (COL)	Manzana Postobón	+ 0.31
3.	Israel Ochoa (COL)	Gaseosas Glacial	+ 0.46
4.	Luis Alberto González (COL)	Gaseosas Glacial	+ 0.58
5.	Chepe González (COL)	Manzana Postobón	+ 0.59
6.	Gerardo Moncada (COL)	Manzana Postobón	+ 1.04
7.	Pedro Rodríguez (ECU)	Pony Malta de Bavaria	+ 1.06
8.	Álvaro Sierra (COL)	Gaseosas Glacial	+ 1.57
9.	Federico Muñoz (COL)	Kelme-Pony Malta	+ 3.55
10.	Ruber Marín (COL)	Manzana Postobón	+ 4.01

== Teams ==
Pony Malta-Avianca

1. (Ecuador) Juan Carlos Rosero
2. (Ecuador) Pedro Rodríguez
3. (Colombia) Omar Trompa
4. (Colombia) Víctor Hugo Bolívar
5. (Colombia) Julio César Aguirre
6. (Colombia) Adolfo Rico
7. (Colombia) Víctor Samacá
8. (Colombia) Jair Bernal
9. (Colombia) José Castelblanco
10. (Colombia) Nélson Rodríguez

Alemania-Ahusan (Hessen)

11. (Germany) Peter Hahner
12. (Germany) Martin Bott
13. (Germany) Markus Scheleicher
14. (Germany) Michael Bartilitcher
15. (Germany) René Dueveling
16. (Germany) Marco Rivas-Mai

Kelme-Pony Malta-Xacobeo

21. (Colombia) Néstor Mora
22. (Colombia) José Martín Farfán
23. (Colombia) Augusto González
24. (Colombia) Hernán Buenahora
25. (Colombia) Ángel Camargo
26. (Colombia) Federico Muñoz
27. (Colombia) Julio César Cadena

Gaseosas Glacial Profesional PRF

31. (Colombia) Luis Alberto González
32. (Colombia) José Fabio Moreno
33. (Colombia) Israel Ochoa
34. (Colombia) William Feliciano
35. (Colombia) César Ramírez
36. (Colombia) Álvaro Sierra
37. (Colombia) Santiago Amador
38. (Colombia) Miguel Ángel Sanabria
39. (Colombia) Demetrio Cuspoca
40. (Colombia) Rubén Darío Beltrán

Lotería de Medellín-AA

41. (Colombia) Carlos Jaramillo
42. (Colombia) Óscar Vargas
43. (Colombia) Argiro Zapata
44. (Colombia) Jorge Otálvaro
45. (Colombia) Raúl Acosta
46. (Colombia) Héctor Castaño
47. (Colombia) Javier Zapata
48. (Colombia) Dubán Ramírez
49. (Colombia) Juan Fajardo
50. (Colombia) Héctor Castaño

Cadafé

51. (Venezuela) Luis Barroso
52. (Venezuela) Omar Pumar
53. (Venezuela) Richard Parra
54. (Venezuela) José Lindarte
55. (Venezuela) Eddinel Figueroa
56. (Venezuela) Óscar Mendoza
57. (Colombia) José Villamizar

Manzana Postobón

61. (Colombia) Raúl Montaña
62. (Colombia) Libardo Niño
63. (Colombia) Chepe González
64. (Colombia) Edgar Humberto Ruiz
65. (Colombia) Gerardo Moncada
66. (Colombia) Ruber Marín
67. (Colombia) Héctor Palacio
68. (Colombia) Julio Ernesto Bernal
69. (Colombia) Hernán Patiño
70. (Colombia) Asdrúbal Patiño

Agua Natural Glacial

71. (Colombia) Armando Moreno
72. (Colombia) Juan Alberto Robayo
73. (Colombia) Luis Cárdenas
74. (Colombia) Jairo Torres
75. (Colombia) Heymar Espinosa
76. (Colombia) Héctor Sierra
77. (Colombia) Luciano Bonilla
78. (Colombia) Fabio Arenas
79. (Colombia) Robert Ramírez
80. (Colombia) Orlando Ortegón

Carchi Ecuador

81. (Ecuador) Eduardo Villarreal
82. (Ecuador) Rodrigo Villarreal
83. (Ecuador) Antonio Revelo
84. (Ecuador) Segundo Chugulí
85. (Ecuador) Vinicio Huera
86. (Ecuador) Armando Guasquer

Pinturas Rust Oleum

91. (Colombia) Celio Roncancio
92. (Colombia) Elder Herrera
93. (Colombia) Juan Carlos Arias
94. (Colombia) Eduardo Guerrero
95. (Colombia) Alex Barbosa
96. (Colombia) Jaime Alberto Bolívar
97. (Colombia) Waldo Aguilera
98. (Colombia) Wenceslao Lancheros
99. (Colombia) Marco Isaías

Lotería de Nariño

101. (Colombia) Virgilio Mora
102. (Colombia) Walter Barco
103. (Colombia) Sergio Escobar
104. (Colombia) Henry Castillo
105. (Colombia) Luis Alberto Yandar
106. (Colombia) Javier Sánchez
107. (Colombia) Óscar León
108. (Colombia) Luis Carlos Gómez

Pilsener Ecuador

111. (Ecuador) Héctor Chiles
112. (Colombia) Carlos Arturo Vargas
113. (Ecuador) Pablo Perugachi
114. (Ecuador) Byrón Chulde
115. (Ecuador) Miguel Padilla
116. (Ecuador) Raúl Huera
117. (Colombia) José Tiberio Beltrán
118. (Kazakhstan) Daulet Sapazhanov
