= Raúl Montaña =

Colombian cyclist

Raúl Alexander Montaña Herrera (born September 22, 1971 in Bogotá) is a retired male road racing cyclist from Colombia, who became a professional rider in 1994.

== Career ==
1992
1st in General Classification Vuelta a Colombia Sub-23 (COL)
1993
1st in General Classification Vuelta a Boyacá (COL)
1995
1st in Stage 3 Clásico RCN, Armenia (COL)
1st in General Classification Clásico RCN (COL)
1996
1st in Stage 9 Vuelta a Colombia, Palmira (COL)
1997
1st in Stage 2 Clásico RCN, Monguí (COL)
1st in Stage 5 Clásico RCN, Barrancabermeja (COL)
1st in Stage 10 Clásico RCN, Bogotá (COL)
1st in General Classification Clásico RCN (COL)
1st in General Combination Classification Vuelta a Colombia (COL)
6th in General Classification Vuelta a Colombia (COL)
1998
1st in Stage 10 Vuelta a Colombia, Barrancabermeja (COL)
1st in Stage 5 Clásico RCN, Buenaventura (COL)
1st in Stage 7 Clásico RCN, Armenia (COL)
1st in Stage 8 Clásico RCN, Espinal (COL)
1st in General Classification Clásico RCN (COL)
1999
1st in Stage 5 Vuelta a Colombia, La Pintada (COL)
1st in Stage 14 Vuelta a Colombia, Zipaquirá (COL)
1st in Stage 15 Vuelta a Colombia, Circuito en Bogotá (COL)
2000
1st in Stage 6 Vuelta a Colombia, Medellín (COL)
1st in Stage 15 Vuelta a Colombia, Tunja (COL)
1st in Stage 1 Vuelta a Boyacá, Tunja (COL)
3rd in General Classification Vuelta a Boyacá (COL)
3rd in Colombia National Championship, Road, ITT, Elite, Colombia (COL)
2001
1st in Stage 12 Vuelta a Venezuela, Ocumare del Tuy (VEN)
8th in General Classification Vuelta a Venezuela (VEN)
