= Édgar Humberto Ruiz =

Colombian cyclist

Personal information
- Born: January 22, 1971 (age 55) Bogotá, Colombia

Cycling career
- Sport: Cycling
- Current team: Retired
- Discipline: Road racing
- Role: Rider

Édgar Humberto Ruiz Sierra (born January 22, 1971, in Bogotá) is a retired male road cyclist from Colombia, who was a professional from 1994 to 1995.

== Career ==
1990
1st in General Classification Vuelta a Colombia Sub-23 (COL)
1992
6th in General Classification Vuelta a Colombia (COL)
1993
2nd in General Classification Vuelta a Colombia (COL)
