= Abelardo Ríos =

Colombian cyclist

Personal information
- Full name: Abelardo Ríos Osorio
- Born: 20 January 1952 (age 74) Alejandría, Colombia
- Height: 1.61 m (5 ft 3 in)
- Weight: 63 kg (139 lb)

Cycling career
- Sport: Cycling
- Discipline: Road
- Role: Rider

Amateur teams
- 1971: Administradora Postal Nacional
- 1972–1976: Polímeros Colombianos
- 1976–1977: Libreta de Plata
- 1978: Castalia
- 1979: Freskola
- 1980–1982: Pilsen Cervunión
- 1983–1984: Pilas Varta–Colombia

Professional teams
- 1985: Colpatria
- 1985: Varta–Café de Colombia–Mavic
- 1986: Felipe Almacenes y Joyerias
- 1986: Coca Cola–Caja Social
- 1987: Western–Rossin
- 1988: Pony Malta

Abelardo Ríos Osorio (Note: In this Spanish name, the first or paternal surname is Ríos and the second or maternal family name is Osorio.) (born 20 January 1952) is a Colombian former professional racing cyclist. He rode in two editions of the Tour de France and one edition of the Giro d'Italia. He also competed in the individual road race at the 1976 Summer Olympics.

== Major results ==
1971
4th Overall Clásico RCN

1st Young rider classification

1972
4th Overall Clásico RCN
1973
1st Stage 7 Vuelta a Colombia
9th Overall Tour de l'Avenir
1974
3rd Overall Clásico RCN

1st Stage 3

3rd Overall Vuelta a Antioquia
1975
2nd Overall Clásico RCN
3rd Road race, National Road Championships
1976
1st Overall Vuelta a Antioquia

1st Stages 4 & 6
1st Points classification
1st Combination classification

2nd Overall Vuelta a Cuba

1st Mountains classification
1st Stage 5

9th Overall Vuelta a Colombia

1st Stage 4

1977
1st Road race, National Road Championships
1st Overall Clásica Nacional Marco Fidel Suárez
1978
1st Overall Vuelta a Antioquia
1st Stage 1 Clásico RCN
1st Stage 1 Vuelta a Boyacá
1979
1st Stage 6 Vuelta a Colombia
1981
1st Stage 3 Vuelta a Colombia
1st Stage 4 Clásico RCN
1982
1st Overall Clásica de El Carmen de Viboral
1983
9th Overall Vuelta a Colombia
1986
1st Stage 1 Vuelta a Colombia
1987
1st Stage 12 Vuelta a Colombia

=== Grand Tour general classification results timeline ===
Grand Tour	1983	1984	1985
Giro d'Italia	—	—	62
Tour de France	44	DNF	—
Vuelta a España	—	—	—
