= Danny Osorio =

Colombian cyclist

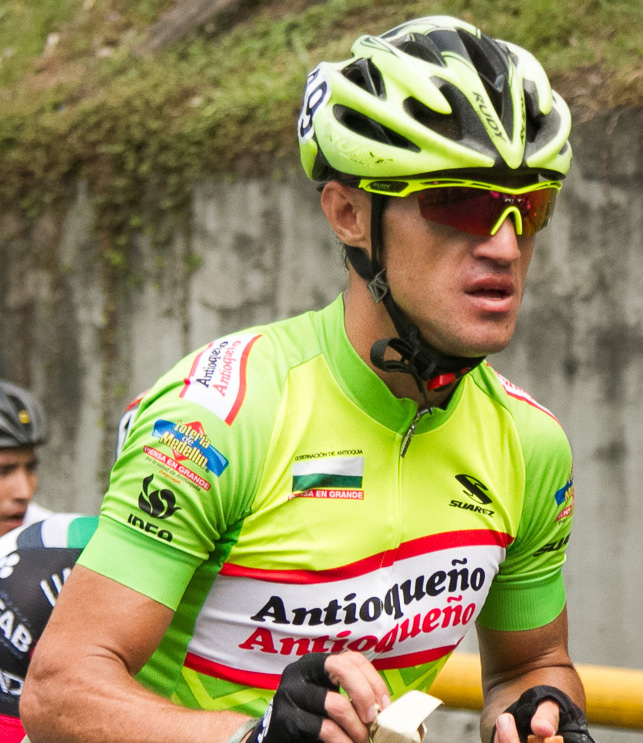
- Osorio in 2018

Personal information
- Full name: Danny Alberto Osorio Calle
- Born: 24 June 1988 (age 38) La Estrella, Antioquia, Colombia

Cycling career
- Sport: Cycling
- Current team: Orgullo Paisa
- Discipline: Road
- Role: Rider
- Rider type: Climber

Amateur teams
- 2010: GW Shimano–Chec–Edeq–Envia
- 2011: Formesan Panachi–Indersantader
- 2012: Grupo Elite El Mago Editores
- 2013: Coltejer–Alcaldía de Manizales
- 2014–2016: Blanco del Valle–Redetrans–Supergiros
- 2016: Team Arroz Sonora–Dimonex
- 2017: Orgullo Paisa
- 2021–2022: Equipe Continental Orgullo Paisa

Professional teams
- 2018–2020: Orgullo Paisa
- 2023: Team Medellín–EPM
- 2024–: Orgullo Paisa

Danny Alberto Osorio Calle (born 24 June 1988) is a Colombian road cyclist, who currently rides for UCI Continental team Orgullo Paisa.

== Major results ==
2013
5th Overall Vuelta a Ecuador
5th Overall Clásico RCN
2014
3rd Overall Clásico RCN
6th Overall Vuelta a Colombia
2015
4th Overall Vuelta a Chiriquí

1st Mountains classification

2016
2nd Overall Vuelta a Antioquia
2017
1st Overall Vuelta a Antioquia

1st Stage 5 (ITT)

2nd Overall Clásica de Marinilla

1st Sprints classification
1st Stage 1

2nd Overall Clásica de El Carmen de Viboral
3rd Overall Clásico RCN
3rd Overall Clásica de Anapoima
10th Overall Vuelta a Colombia
2018
1st Stage 2 Clásica de Anapoima
9th Overall Colombia Oro y Paz
2019
1st Stage 2 Clásica de Marinilla
2020
2nd Overall Vuelta a Antioquia
4th Overall Vuelta a Colombia
2021
1st Stage 1 Vuelta al Gran Santander
3rd Overall Vuelta al Táchira
4th Overall Vuelta a Colombia
2023
6th Overall Tour de Catamarca
8th Overall Vuelta Bantrab
