= Josef Lontscharitsch =

Austrian cyclist (born 1970)

Johann Lienhart
Personal information
- Born: 11 April 1970 (age 56) Madrid, Spain

Cycling career
- Sport: Cycling

Josef Lontscharitsch (born 11 April 1970) is a Spanish-born retired Austrian male road cyclist. He won the Austrian National Road Race Championships in 1995 and 1998.

== Career ==
1987
3rd in World Championships, Road, Juniors, Bergamo (ITA)
1989
3rd in Austria National Championships, Road, Amateurs, Austria (AUT)
3rd in Austria National Championships, Road, Elite, Austria (AUT)
1994
1st in Bad Radkersberg (GER)
3rd in Linz (AUT)
1995
3rd in Memorial Peter Dittrich (AUT)
1st in Austria National Championships, Road, Amateurs, Austria (AUT)
1st in Austria National Championships, Road, Elite, Austria (AUT)
1st in Stage 1 Niederoesterreich Rundfahrt, Wolkendorf (AUT)
3rd in Stage 3 Niederoesterreich Rundfahrt, Gars/Kamp (AUT)
3rd in General Classification Niederoesterreich Rundfahrt (AUT)
2nd in Stage 1 Österreich-Rundfahrt, Linz (AUT)
3rd in Stage 5 Österreich-Rundfahrt, Lienz (AUT)
2nd in Stage 11 Österreich-Rundfahrt, Illmitz (AUT)
1996
1st in Altheim (AUT)
1st in General Classification Vuelta a Chiriquí (PAN)
1997
1st in Altheim (AUT)
1998
1st in Austria National Championships, Road, Elite, Austria (AUT)
1st in Stage 2 Vuelta a Colombia, Cáqueza (COL)
3rd in Stage 10 Vuelta a Colombia, Barrancabermeja (COL)
1999
3rd in Austria National Championships, Road, ITT, Elite, Austria (AUT)
2nd in Prologue Tour de Slovénie (SLO)
3rd in Stage 1 Tour de Slovénie, Nova Gorica (SLO)
1st in Stage 2 Tour de Slovénie, Rogaska Slatina (SLO)
2nd in Stage 6 Tour de Slovénie, Novo Mesto (SLO)
1st in Stage 6 Österreich-Rundfahrt, Kaltenbach im Zillertal (AUT)
2000
1st in GP Judendorf Straßenengel (AUT)
2nd in Austria National Championships, Road, ITT, Elite, Austria (AUT)
1st in Raiffeisen Grand Prix (AUT)
3rd in Stage 9 Vuelta a Cuba, Santa Clara (CUB)
2nd in Stage 6 Österreich-Rundfahrt, Bad Hofgastein (AUT)
2nd in Stage 7 Österreich-Rundfahrt, Saalbach Hinterglemm (AUT)
2001
3rd in Stage 3 Vuelta al Táchira, Sabaneta (VEN)
3rd in Rund um die Nürnberger Altstadt (GER)
