= Raúl Acosta =

Colombian cyclist

Raúl Acosta Arias (born February 8, 1962, in Honda, Tolima) is a retired male road cyclist from Colombia, who was a professional from 1986 to 1995.

== Major results ==
1986
1st in Stage 1 Clásico RCN (COL)
1988
1st in Stage 8 Clásico RCN (COL)
1993
1st in Stage 16 Vuelta a Colombia, Circuito Cúcuta (COL)
