= Uwe Hardter =

German cyclist

Personal information
- Born: 14 January 1977 (age 49) Tübingen, Germany

Cycling career
- Sport: Cycling
- Current team: Retired
- Discipline: Road
- Role: Rider

Professional teams
- 2000–2004: Gerolsteiner
- 2005–2006: Team Lamonta
- 2007: Atlas–Romer's Hausbäckerei

Uwe Hardter (born 14 January 1977 in Tübingen) is a German former professional cyclist. He rode in the 2003 Giro d'Italia, finishing 64th overall.

== Major results ==
2002
7th GP Triberg-Schwarzwald
2006
7th Overall Tour of Indonesia
