= Fabio Jaramillo =

Colombian cyclist (born 1967)

Fabio León Jaramillo Mesa (born April 19, 1967 in Itagüí) is a retired male road cyclist from Colombia, who was a professional in the 1990s. He is a younger brother of Carlos Jaramillo.

== Career ==
1992
1st in Stage 6 Vuelta a Colombia, Medellín (COL)
