= Dubán Ramírez =

Colombian cyclist

Personal information
- Born: 30 December 1965 (age 60) Medellín, Antioquia, Colombia

Cycling career
- Sport: Cycling

Dubán Alberto Ramírez Rodríguez (born 30 December 1965) is a retired male road cyclist from Colombia, who was a professional rider from 1990 to 1998. He twice competed for his native country at the Summer Olympics: 1988 and 1996.

== Career ==
1993
1st in Stage 5 Clásica Coljueces Cundinamarca (COL)
1st in General Classification Clásica del Valle (COL)
2nd in Stage 8 Vuelta a Colombia, Ibagué (COL)
1994
1st in General Classification Vuelta al Valle del Cauca (COL)
1st in Stage 5 Clásica Antioqueña (COL)
1st in Clásica Viboral (COL)
1st in Clásica Nortevallacaucana (COL)
1st in Clásica Idea (COL)
1995
1st in Stage 3 Clásica Colprensa (ESP)
1st in Prologue Clásico RCN, Medellín (COL)
1st in Stage 8 Clásico RCN, Tunja (COL)
1st in Stage 12 Vuelta a Colombia, Santa Fe de Bogota (COL)
1st in Stage 2 Clásica Integración de la Guadua-Gobernación de Risaralda (COL)
1996
1st in Stage 3 Clásica a Itagüí (COL)
1st in Prologue Clásico RCN (COL)
1st in Stage 1 Vuelta a Colombia, Colmena (COL)
1st in Colombia National Championships, Road, Individual Time Trial, Elite, Colombia (COL)
1st in Stage 5 Vuelta a Boyacá (COL)
1997
1st in Vuelta a Cundinamarca (COL)
1st in General Classification Vuelta a Cundinamarca (COL)
1998
1st in Stage 4 Vuelta a Cundinamarca (COL)
2nd in Stage 14 Vuelta a Colombia, Tunja (COL)
3rd in Prologue Clásico RCN, Barrancabermeja (COL)
1st in Stage 6 Clásico RCN, Pradera (COL)
7th in General Classification Clásico RCN (COL)
1999
1st in Stage 8 Vuelta a Colombia (COL)
2000
2nd in Stage 5 Vuelta a Boyacá, Tunja (COL)
3rd in Prologue Clásico RCN, Medellin (COL)
4th in General Classification Vuelta a Colombia (COL)
