= Jesus Rosado =

Spanish cyclist (born 1967)

Personal information
- Born: 2 September 1967 (age 59)

Cycling career
- Sport: Cycling
- Role: Rider

Jesus Rosado (born 2 September 1967) is a Spanish racing cyclist. He rode in the 1990 Tour de France.
