= Tenax (cycling team) =

Team information
- UCI code: TEN
- Registered: Italy (2003–2004); Ireland (2005–2007)
- Founded: 2003
- Disbanded: 2007
- Discipline: Road
- Status: GSII (2003–2004); UCI Professional Continental (2005–2007)
- Bicycles: Olmo (2003–2005); Opera (2006–2007)

Key personnel
- Team managers: Mario Chiesa; Giancarlo Perini; Fabio Bordonali; Flavio Miozzo; Marco Tabai

Team name history
- 2003 (until April 16) 2003 (from April 17) 2004 2005 2006 2007: Tenax; Tenax–Garda Calze; Tenax; Tenax–Nobili Rubinetterie; Tenax Salmilano; Tenax–Menikini

Tenax was an Irish UCI Professional Continental cycling team active from 1994 to 2007. The team merged with Team LPR in 2008.

The team competed in the 2003 and 2004 Giro d'Italia.
