= Hernán Patiño =

Colombian cyclist

Hugo Hernán Patiño García (September 13, 1966 in Caicedonia – February 21, 1995 in Manizales) was a Colombian professional road cyclist who competed from 1989 to 1995.

== Career ==
1988
1st in Stage 9 Vuelta a Colombia (COL)
1992
3rd in General Classification Clasica Coljueces Cundinamarca (COL)
1993
1st in Stage 7 Vuelta a Colombia (COL)
1994
2nd in Clásica Santander (COL)
1st in Stage 3 Clásico RCN (COL)
