= Acquappesa =

- Comune
- Comune di Acquappesa
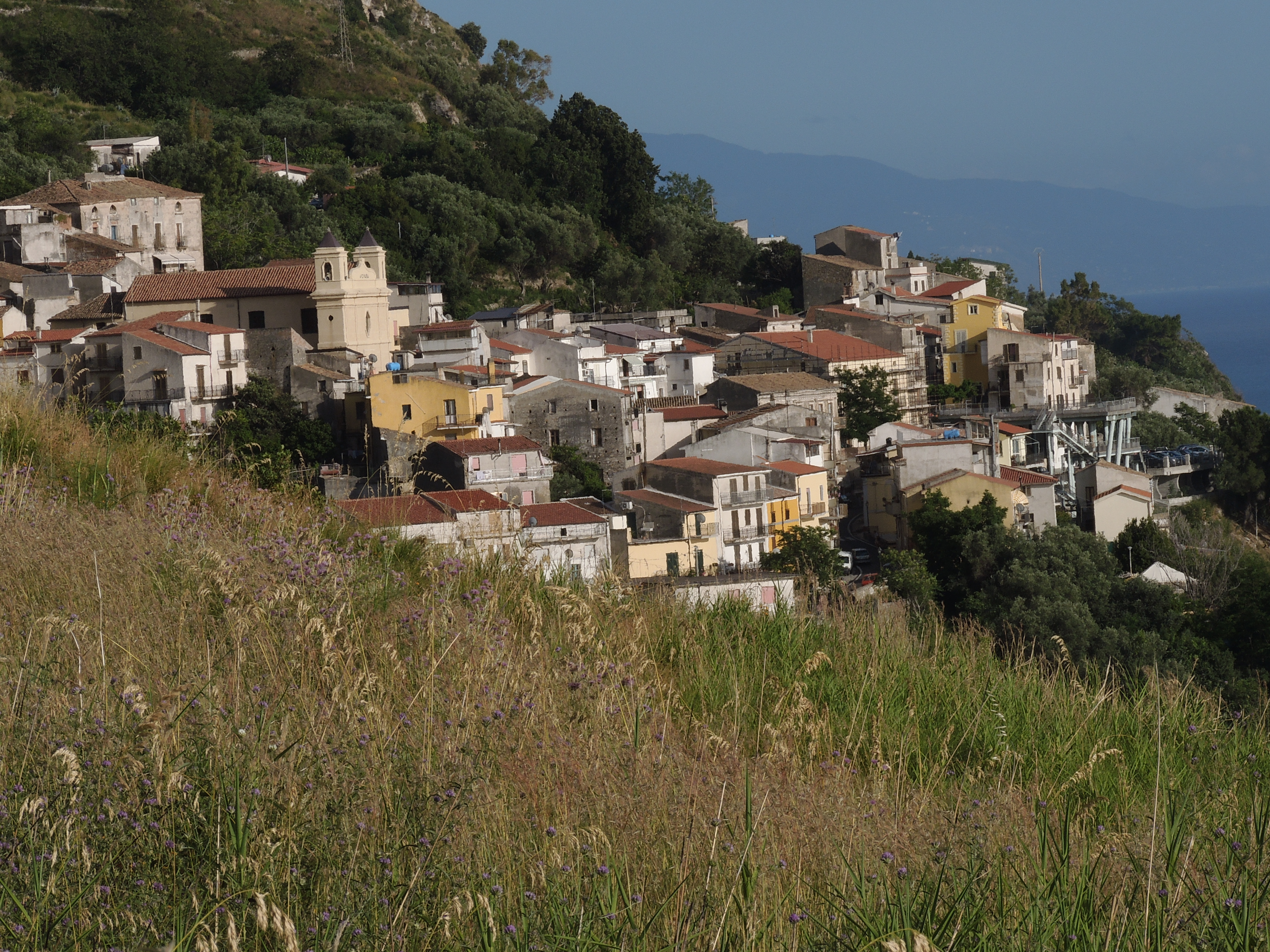

- Location of Acquappesa in Italy Acquappesa (Calabria)
- Coordinates: 39°30′N 15°57′E
- Country: Italy
- Region: Calabria
- Province: Cosenza (CS)
- Frazioni: Bergamotto, Castagnola, Chiusoli, Intavolata, Liguori, Mancusa, Mango, Riuncia, San Martino, Santo Iorio, Scarpa, Terme Luigiane, Vomicheria

Government
  - Mayor: Francesco Tripicchio

Area
  - Total: 17.75 km^{2} (6.85 sq mi)
- Elevation: 80 m (260 ft)

Population (31 December 2018)
  - Total: 1,838
  - Density: 103.5/km^{2} (268.2/sq mi)
- Demonym: Acquappesani
- Time zone: UTC+1 (CET)
  - Summer (DST): UTC+2 (CEST)
- Postal code: 87020
- Dialing code: 0982
- Patron saint: Madonna del Rifugio
- Saint day: 2 July
- Website: Official website

Acquappesa (Calabrian: U Casàle) is a town and comune (municipality) in the province of Cosenza in the Calabria region of southern Italy.
