= 2003 Giro d'Italia =

Race details
- Dates: May 10 – June 1, 2003
- Stages: 21
- Distance: 3,476.5 km (2,160 mi)
- Winning time: 89h 32' 09"

Results
Jersey awarded to the overall winner	Winner	Gilberto Simoni (ITA)	(Saeco)
	Second	Stefano Garzelli (ITA)	(Vini Caldirola–So.di)
	Third	Yaroslav Popovych (UKR)	(Landbouwkrediet–Colnago)
Jersey awarded to the points classification winner	Points	Gilberto Simoni (ITA)	(Saeco)
Jersey awarded to the mountains classification winner	Mountains	Fredy González (COL)	(Colombia–Selle Italia)
	Combativity	Fredy González (COL)	(Colombia–Selle Italia)
Jersey awarded to the intergiro classification winner	Intergiro	Magnus Bäckstedt (SWE)	(Team Fakta-Pata Chips)
	Team	Lampre	
	Team points	Fassa Bortolo	

The 2003 Giro d'Italia was the 86th edition of the Giro d'Italia, one of cycling's Grand Tours. The Giro began in Lecce with a 201 km (125 mi) mass-start stage. The race came to a close with a 33 km (21 mi) individual time trial that began and ended in the Italian city of Milan. Nineteen teams entered the race that was won by the Italian Gilberto Simoni of the Saeco team. Second and third were the Italian Stefano Garzelli and Ukrainian Yaroslav Popovych.

It was Simoni's second win in the Giro. After the race, it was discovered that sixth-placed Raimondas Rumšas had tested positive in this Giro.

This edition of the Giro was the first UCI endorsed race where the wearing of helmets was compulsory.

With Gilberto Simoni's general classification victories in 2003 and in 2001, Simoni became the eighteenth rider to repeat as winner of the Giro d'Italia. In addition to the general classification, Simoni also won the points classification. In the race's other classifications, Colombia–Selle Italia rider Fredy González won the mountains classification and Magnus Bäckstedt of the Team Fakta-Pata Chips team won the intergiro classification. Lampre finished as the winners of the Trofeo Fast Team classification, ranking each of the nineteen teams contesting the race by lowest cumulative time. The other team classification, the Trofeo Super Team classification, where the teams' riders are awarded points for placing within the top twenty in each stage and the points are then totaled for each team was won by Fassa Bortolo.

== Teams ==
A total of 19 teams were invited to participate in the 2003 Giro d'Italia. Each team sent a squad of nine riders (only Kelme–Costa Blanca started eight), so the Giro began with a peloton of 170 cyclists. Out of the 170 riders that started this edition of the Giro d'Italia, a total of 97 riders made it to the finish in Milan.

The 19 teams that took part in the race were:

- Alessio
- CCC–Polsat
- Ceramiche Panaria–Fiordo
- Colombia–Selle Italia
- De Nardi
- Domina Vacanze-Elitron
- Fassa Bortolo
- FDJeux.com
- Formaggi Pinzolo Fiavè
- Gerolsteiner
- Kelme–Costa Blanca
- Lampre
- Landbouwkrediet–Colnago
- Lotto–Domo
- Mercatone Uno–Scanavino
- Saeco
- Team Fakta-Pata Chips
- Tenax–Garda Calze
- Vini Caldirola–So.di

== Route and stages ==
Monte Zoncolan was climbed from eastern side of the mountain where the climb begins in Sutrio. The mountain hosted the end of the 185 km (115 mi) twelfth stage.

The route for the 2003 Giro d'Italia was unveiled by race director Carmine Castellano on 30 November 2002 in Milan. It contained two time trial events, all of which were individual. The organizers divided the remaining eighteen stages into three categories: flat stages, rolling stages, and mountain stages. Twelve of the stages were declared flat stages. Of the seven stages remaining, three stages were designated rolling stages and three were ranked as mountain stages. In the stages containing categorized climbs, six had summit finishes: stage 3, to Terme Luigiane; stage 7, to Monte Terminillo; stage 12, to Monte Zoncolan; stage 14, to Alpe di Pampeago; stage 18, to Chianale; and stage 19, to Cascata del Toce. The organizers chose to include two rest days. When compared to the previous year's race, the race was 122 km (76 mi) longer, contained the same amount of rest days, and one less individual time trial. In addition, this race lacked an opening prologue like the previous year had.

Stage characteristics and winners
Stage	Date	Course	Distance	Type	Winner
1	10 May	Lecce to Lecce	201 km (125 mi)	Flat stage	Alessandro Petacchi (ITA)
2	11 May	Copertino to Matera	177 km (110 mi)	Flat stage	Fabio Baldato (ITA)
3	12 May	Policoro to Terme Luigiane	145 km (90 mi)	Medium mountain stage	Stefano Garzelli (ITA)
4	13 May	Terme Luigiane to Vibo Valentia	170 km (106 mi)	Medium mountain stage	Robbie McEwen (AUS)
5	14 May	Messina to Catania	176 km (109 mi)	Medium mountain stage	Alessandro Petacchi (ITA)
	15 May	Rest day			
6	16 May	Maddaloni to Avezzano	222 km (138 mi)	Medium mountain stage	Alessandro Petacchi (ITA)
7	17 May	Avezzano to Monte Terminillo	146 km (91 mi)	Mountain stage	Stefano Garzelli (ITA)
8	18 May	Rieti to Arezzo	214 km (133 mi)	Flat stage	Mario Cipollini (ITA)
9	19 May	Arezzo to Montecatini Terme	160 km (99 mi)	Flat stage	Mario Cipollini (ITA)
10	20 May	Montecatini Terme to Faenza	202 km (126 mi)	Medium mountain stage	Kurt Asle Arvesen (NOR)
11	21 May	Faenza to San Donà di Piave	222 km (138 mi)	Flat stage	Robbie McEwen (AUS)
12	22 May	San Donà di Piave to Monte Zoncolan	185 km (115 mi)	Mountain stage	Gilberto Simoni (ITA)
13	23 May	Pordenone to Marostica	149 km (93 mi)	Flat stage	Alessandro Petacchi (ITA)
14	24 May	Marostica to Alpe di Pampeago	162 km (101 mi)	Mountain stage	Gilberto Simoni (ITA)
15	25 May	Merano to Bolzano	42.5 km (26 mi)	Individual time trial	Aitor González (ESP)
16	26 May	Arco to Pavia	207 km (129 mi)	Flat stage	Alessandro Petacchi (ITA)
	27 May	Rest day			
17	28 May	Salice Terme to Asti	117 km (73 mi)	Flat stage	Alessandro Petacchi (ITA)
18	29 May	Sanuario di Vicoforte to Chianale	174 km (108 mi)	Mountain stage	Dario Frigo (ITA)
19	30 May	Canelli to Cascata del Toce	239 km (149 mi)	Mountain stage	Gilberto Simoni (ITA)
20	31 May	Cannobio to Cantù	133 km (83 mi)	Flat stage	Giovanni Lombardi (ITA)
21	1 June	Milan to Milan	33 km (21 mi)	Individual time trial	Serhiy Honchar (UKR)
	Total		3,476.5 km (2,160 mi)		

== Classification leadership ==
In the 2003 Giro d'Italia, five different jerseys were awarded. For the general classification, calculated by adding each cyclist's finishing times on each stage, and allowing time bonuses for the first three finishers on mass-start stages, the leader received a pink jersey. This classification is considered the most important of the Giro d'Italia, and the winner is considered the winner of the Giro.

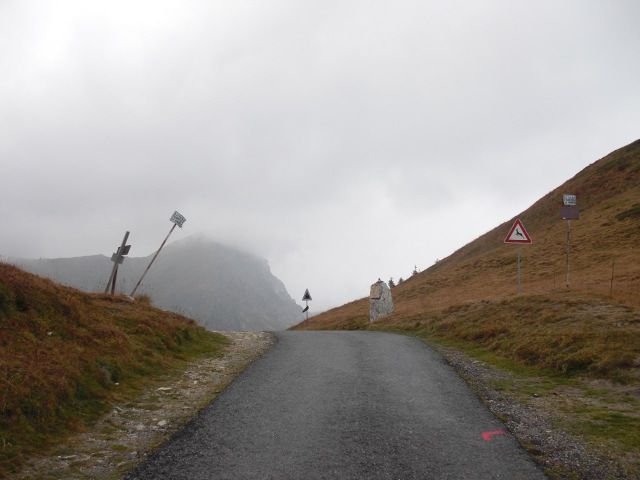
The Colle d'Esischie was the Cima Coppi for the 2004 Giro d'Italia.

Additionally, there was a points classification, which awarded a mauve jersey. In the points classification, cyclists got points for finishing in the top 15 in a stage. The stage win awarded 25 points, second place awarded 20 points, third 16, fourth 14, fifth 12, sixth 10, and one point fewer per place down the line, to a single point for 15th. In addition, points could be won in intermediate sprints.

There was also a mountains classification, which awarded a green jersey. In the mountains classifications, points were won by reaching the top of a mountain before other cyclists. Each climb was categorized as either first, second, or third category, with more points available for the higher-categorized climbs. The highest point in the Giro (called the Cima Coppi), which in 2003 was the Colle d'Esischie, afforded more points than the other first-category climbs.

The fourth jersey represented the intergiro classification, marked by a blue jersey. The calculation for the intergiro is similar to that of the general classification, in each stage there is a midway point that the riders pass through a point and where their time is stopped. As the race goes on, their times compiled and the person with the lowest time is the leader of the intergiro classification and wears the blue jersey.

There were also two classifications for teams. The first was the Trofeo Fast Team. In this classification, the times of the best three cyclists per team on each stage were added; the leading team was the team with the lowest total time. The Trofeo Super Team was a team points classification, with the top 20 placed riders on each stage earning points (20 for first place, 19 for second place and so on, down to a single point for 20th) for their team.

The rows in the following table correspond to the jerseys awarded after that stage was run.

Classification leadership by stage
Stage	Winner	General classification	Points classification	Mountains classification	Intergiro classification	Trofeo Fast Team	Trofeo Super Team
1	Alessandro Petacchi	Alessandro Petacchi	Alessandro Petacchi	not awarded	Andris Naudužs	De Nardi-Colpack	Ceramiche Panaria–Fiordo
2	Fabio Baldato	Alessandro Petacchi	Alessandro Petacchi	Fredy González	Mario Cipollini	Alessio	Alessio
3	Stefano Garzelli	Alessandro Petacchi	Alessandro Petacchi	Fredy González	Andris Naudužs	Alessio	Alessio
4	Robbie McEwen	Alessandro Petacchi	Alessandro Petacchi	Fredy González	Andris Naudužs	Alessio	Alessio
5	Alessandro Petacchi	Alessandro Petacchi	Alessandro Petacchi	Fredy González	Moreno di Biase	Alessio	Alessio
6	Alessandro Petacchi	Alessandro Petacchi	Alessandro Petacchi	Fredy González	Moreno di Biase	Alessio	Fassa Bortolo
7	Stefano Garzelli	Stefano Garzelli	Alessandro Petacchi	Fredy González	Moreno di Biase	Saeco	Alessio
8	Mario Cipollini	Stefano Garzelli	Alessandro Petacchi	Fredy González	Moreno di Biase	Saeco	Alessio
9	Mario Cipollini	Stefano Garzelli	Alessandro Petacchi	Fredy González	Moreno di Biase	Saeco	Domina Vacanze-Elitron
10	Kurt Asle Arvesen	Gilberto Simoni	Alessandro Petacchi	Fredy González	Moreno di Biase	Saeco	Domina Vacanze-Elitron
11	Robbie McEwen	Gilberto Simoni	Alessandro Petacchi	Fredy González	Moreno di Biase	Saeco	Fassa Bortolo
12	Gilberto Simoni	Gilberto Simoni	Alessandro Petacchi	Fredy González	Moreno di Biase	Lampre	Fassa Bortolo
13	Alessandro Petacchi	Gilberto Simoni	Alessandro Petacchi	Fredy González	Moreno di Biase	Lampre	Fassa Bortolo
14	Gilberto Simoni	Gilberto Simoni	Alessandro Petacchi	Fredy González	Moreno di Biase	Lampre	Fassa Bortolo
15	Aitor González	Gilberto Simoni	Alessandro Petacchi	Fredy González	Magnus Bäckstedt	Lampre	Fassa Bortolo
16	Alessandro Petacchi	Gilberto Simoni	Alessandro Petacchi	Fredy González	Magnus Bäckstedt	Lampre	Fassa Bortolo
17	Alessandro Petacchi	Gilberto Simoni	Alessandro Petacchi	Fredy González	Magnus Bäckstedt	Lampre	Fassa Bortolo
18	Dario Frigo	Gilberto Simoni	Stefano Garzelli	Fredy González	Magnus Bäckstedt	Saeco	Fassa Bortolo
19	Gilberto Simoni	Gilberto Simoni	Gilberto Simoni	Fredy González	Magnus Bäckstedt	Saeco	Fassa Bortolo
20	Giovanni Lombardi	Gilberto Simoni	Gilberto Simoni	Fredy González	Magnus Bäckstedt	Saeco	Fassa Bortolo
21	Serhiy Honchar	Gilberto Simoni	Gilberto Simoni	Fredy González	Magnus Bäckstedt	Lampre	Fassa Bortolo
Final		Gilberto Simoni	Gilberto Simoni	Fredy González	Magnus Bäckstedt	Lampre	Fassa Bortolo

== Final standings ==
Legend
Pink jersey	Denotes the winner of the General classification	Green jersey	Denotes the winner of the Mountains classification
Purple jersey	Denotes the winner of the Points classification	Blue jersey	Denotes the winner of the Intergiro classification

=== General classification ===
	Rider	Team	Time
1	Gilberto Simoni (ITA)	Saeco	89h 32' 09"
2	Stefano Garzelli (ITA)	Vini Caldirola–So.di	+ 7' 06"
3	Yaroslav Popovych (UKR)	Landbouwkrediet–Colnago	+ 7' 11"
4	Andrea Noè (ITA)	Alessio	+ 9' 24"
5	Georg Totschnig (AUT)	Gerolsteiner	+ 9' 42"
DSQ	~~Raimondas Rumšas (LIT)~~	Lampre	+ 9' 50"
6	Dario Frigo (ITA)	Fassa Bortolo	+ 10' 50"
7	Serhiy Honchar (UKR)	De Nardi	+ 14' 14"
8	Franco Pellizotti (ITA)	Alessio	+ 14' 26"
9	Eddy Mazzoleni (ITA)	Vini Caldirola–So.di	+ 19' 21"

=== Points classification ===
	Rider	Team	Points
1	Gilberto Simoni (ITA)	Saeco	154
2	Stefano Garzelli (ITA)	Vini Caldirola–So.di	154
3	Ján Svorada (CZE)	Lampre	137
4	Magnus Bäckstedt (SWE)	Team Fakta-Pata Chips	119
5	Eddy Mazzoleni (ITA)	Vini Caldirola–So.di	91
6	Dario Frigo (ITA)	Fassa Bortolo	90
7	Yaroslav Popovych (UKR)	Landbouwkrediet–Colnago	88
8	Giovanni Lombardi (ITA)	Domina Vacanze-Elitron	81
9	Aitor González (ESP)	Fassa Bortolo	70
10	Serhiy Honchar (UKR)	De Nardi	69

=== Mountains classification ===
	Rider	Team	Points
1	Fredy González (COL)	Colombia–Selle Italia	100
2	Gilberto Simoni (ITA)	Saeco	78
3	Constantino Zaballa (ESP)	Kelme–Costa Blanca	65
4	Stefano Garzelli (ITA)	Vini Caldirola–So.di	36
5	Dario Frigo (ITA)	Fassa Bortolo	29
6	Paolo Lanfranchi (ITA)	Landbouwkrediet–Colnago	24
7	Marzio Bruseghin (ITA)	Fassa Bortolo	15
8	Yaroslav Popovych (UKR)	Landbouwkrediet–Colnago	12
9	Georg Totschnig (AUT)	Gerolsteiner	12
10	Andrea Noè (ITA)	Alessio	10

=== Intergiro classification ===
	Rider	Team	Time
1	Magnus Bäckstedt (SWE)	Team Fakta-Pata Chips	50h 20' 37"
2	Ján Svorada (CZE)	Lampre	+ 2' 02"
3	Constantino Zaballa (ESP)	Kelme–Costa Blanca	+ 2' 26"
4	Fortunato Baliani (ITA)	Formaggi Pinzolo Fiave	+ 3' 06"
5	Aitor González (ESP)	Fassa Bortolo	+ 3' 09"
6	Serhiy Honchar (UKR)	De Nardi	+ 3' 20"
7	Sandy Casar (FRA)	FDJeux.com	+ 3' 30"
8	Ignacio Gutierrez Cataluna (ESP)	Kelme–Costa Blanca	+ 3' 36"
9	Dario Frigo (ITA)	Fassa Bortolo	+ 3' 50"
10	Eddy Mazzoleni (ITA)	Vini Caldirola–So.di	+ 3' 54"

=== Trofeo Fast Team classification ===
	Team	Time
1	Lampre	269h 37' 37"
2	Saeco	+ 1' 08"
3	Alessio	+ 5' 46"
4	Fassa Bortolo	+ 18' 39"
5	Vini Caldirola–So.di	+ 20' 54"
6	Mercatone Uno–Scanavino	+ 32' 41"
7	Gerolsteiner	+ 53' 40"
8	CCC–Polsat	+ 57' 04"
9	De Nardi	+ 1h 14' 02"
10	Kelme–Costa Blanca	+ 1h 17' 35"

=== Trofeo Super Team classification ===
	Team	Points
1	Fassa Bortolo	561
2	Lampre	394
3	Alessio	354
4	Domina Vacanze-Elitron	343
5	Vini Caldirola–So.di	315
6	Saeco	312
7	De Nardi	258
8	Landbouwkrediet–Colnago	251
9	Ceramiche Panaria–Fiordo	247
10	Team Fakta-Pata Chips	225

=== Minor classifications ===
Other less well-known classifications, whose leaders did not receive a special jersey, were awarded during the Giro. Other awards included the Combativity classification, which was a compilation of points gained for position on crossing intermediate sprints, mountain passes and stage finishes. Colombian Fredy González won the Most Combative classification. The Azzurri d'Italia classification was based on finishing order, but points were awarded only to the top three finishers in each stage. The Azzurri d'Italia classification was won by Gilberto Simoni. The Trofeo Fuga Piaggio classification rewarded riders who took part in a breakaway at the head of the field, each rider in an escape of ten or fewer riders getting one point for each kilometre that the group stayed clear. The classification was won by Constantino Zaballa. Teams were given penalty points for minor technical infringements. Colombia–Selle Italia was the most successful in avoiding penalties after not being penalized during the race, and so won the Fair Play classification.
