= Fredy González =

Colombian cyclist (born 1975)

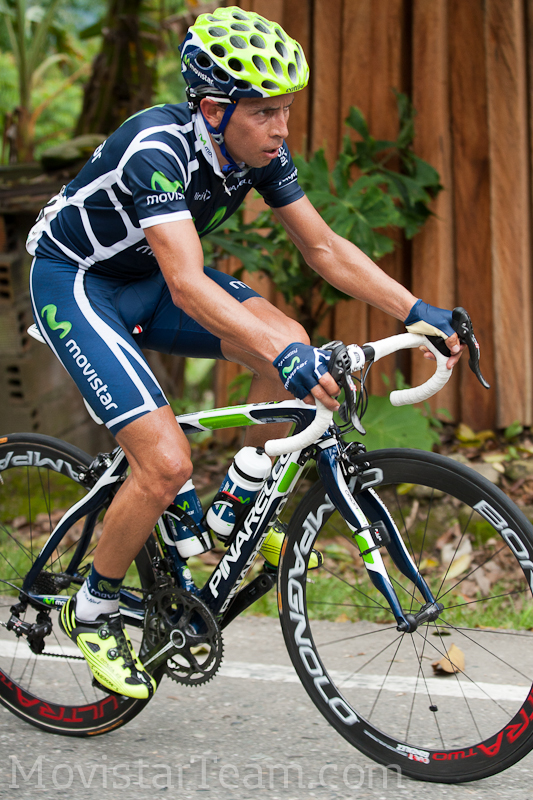

Personal information
- Full name: Freddy Excelino González Martínez
- Born: June 18, 1975 (age 51) La Ceja, Colombia
- Height: 5 ft 3 in (160 cm)

Cycling career
- Sport: Cycling
- Discipline: Road
- Role: Rider

Amateur teams
- 1999: Aguardiente Néctar
- 2009–2010: EBSA

Professional teams
- 2000–2004: Aguardiente Néctar–Selle Italia
- 2005: Ceramica Panaria–Navigare
- 2005: Relax–Fuenlabrada
- 2006: Selle Italia–Diquigiovanni
- 2007–2008: Colombia es Pasión
- 2011: Movistar Continental Team
- 2012: Azad University Cross Team
- 2014: RTS–Santic Racing Team

Freddy Excelino González Martínez (born 18 June 1975 in La Ceja, Colombia), also known as Fredy González, is a Colombian road racing cyclist. He is a two-time winner of the Mountains classification in the Giro d'Italia (one of cycling's three Grand Tours). His victories came in the 2001 and 2003 races. He also came close to winning in 2000, when he finished second to Francesco Casagrande. González has a total of 34 career victories.

== Career achievements ==
=== Major results ===
1998
Vuelta a Colombia

1st Stages 3 & 15

1999
1st Stage 4 Vuelta a Colombia
2nd Overall Vuelta al Táchira

1st Stages 5 & 8

2001
1st Mountains classification, Giro d'Italia
2nd Trofeo dello Scalatore
3rd Overall Settimana Internazionale di Coppi e Bartali
3rd Overall Giro della Liguria
6th Stausee Rundfahrt
2002
8th Giro del Lazio
2003
Giro d'Italia

1st Mountains classification
1st Combativity award

2004
1st Overall Tour de Langkawi
2nd Overall Vuelta al Táchira

1st Stages 8 & 12

2005
2nd Giro d'Oro
3rd GP Industria & Artigianato Larciano
4th Overall Settimana Ciclista Lombarda

1st Mountains classification
1st Stage 4

2007
1st Stage 11 Vuelta a Colombia
6th Overall Volta do Rio de Janeiro
2010
1st Stage 7 Vuelta a Colombia
2011
1st Stage 13 Vuelta a Colombia
4th Road race, National Road Championships

=== Grand Tour general classification results timeline ===
Grand Tour	2000	2001	2002	2003	2004	2005
Giro d'Italia	DNF	46	DNF	34	DNF	DNF
Tour de France	—	—	—	—	—	—
Vuelta a España	—	—	—	—	—	DNF

Legend
DSQ	Disqualified
DNF	Did not finish
