= Carlos Jaramillo =

Colombian cyclist (born 1961)

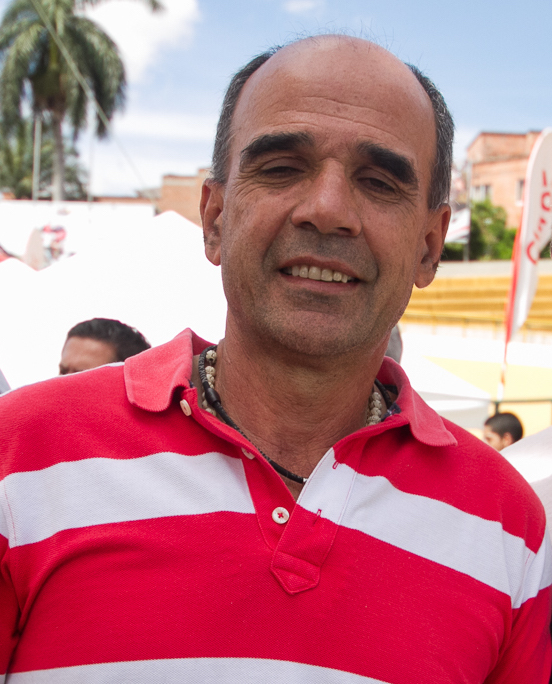

Personal information
- Born: 16 January 1961 (age 65) Itagüí, Antioquia, Colombia

Cycling career
- Sport: Cycling

Carlos María Jaramillo Mesa (born 16 January 1961) is a retired road racing cyclist from Colombia, who was a professional from 1985 to 1996. He competed for his native country at the 1984 Summer Olympics in the individual road race. Jaramillo is a younger brother of Sergio Jaramillo, and the older brother of Fabio Jaramillo.

== Major results ==
1983
(silver) in Pan American Games, Road, Caracas (VEN)
1984
52nd in Olympic Games, Road, Amateurs, Mission Viejo, Los Angeles (USA)
1985
1st in Stage 3 Criterium du Dauphiné Libéré (FRA)
1988
21st in General Classification Vuelta a España (ESP)
1989
13th in General Classification Vuelta a España (ESP)
1991
151st in General Classification Tour de France (FRA)
1992
1st in General Classification Vuelta a Antioquia (COL)
1st in Stage 2 Vuelta a Colombia, Popayán (COL)
4th in General Classification Vuelta a Colombia (COL)
68th in General Classification Tour de France (FRA)
1993
1st in General Classification Clásica 75 años Municipio de Bello Antioquia (COL)
1st in General Classification Clásica Nacional Marco Fidel Suárez (COL)
1st in Stage 7 Vuelta a Colombia, Manizales (COL)
1st in General Classification Vuelta a Colombia (COL)
1994
3rd in General Classification Vuelta a Colombia (COL)
1995
7th in General Classification Vuelta a Colombia (COL)
