= Carlos Alberto Contreras =

Colombian cyclist

Personal information
- Full name: Carlos Alberto Contreras Caño
- Born: 11 December 1973 (age 52) Manizales, Caldas, Colombia

Cycling career
- Sport: Cycling
- Current team: Retired
- Discipline: Road
- Role: Rider

Professional teams
- 1995–1996: Kelme–Sureña
- 1997: Telecom–Flavia
- 1998–2000: Kelme–Costa Blanca
- 2001–2002: Selle Italia–Pacific
- 2003: 05 Orbitel

Major wins
- Grand Tours Giro d'Italia 1 individual stage (2001)

Carlos Alberto Contreras Caño (born 11 December 1973) is a Colombian former professional road cyclist.

== Major results ==
1991
1st Overall Vuelta del Porvenir de Colombia
1994
3rd Overall Vuelta de la Juventud de Colombia
1995
10th Classique des Alpes
1996
6th Overall Vuelta a Colombia

1st Stage 14

1997
2nd Time trial, National Road Championships
5th Overall Vuelta a Colombia
1999
1st Overall Vuelta a Colombia

1st Stage 9

2001
8th Overall Giro d'Italia

1st Stage 14

2002
3rd Overall Vuelta a Antioquia
2003
1st Overall Vuelta a Antioquia

1st Stage 1

=== Grand Tour general classification results timeline ===
Grand Tour	1997	1998	1999	2000	2001	2002
Giro d'Italia	—	—	—	—	8	DNF
Tour de France	—	DNF	19	DNF	—	—
Vuelta a España	15	—	—	—	—	—
