= Israel Ochoa =

Colombian cyclist

Personal information
- Full name: Israel Antonio Ochoa Plazas
- Nickname: El Rápido
- Born: 26 August 1964 (age 62) Paipa, Colombia

Cycling career
- Sport: Cycling
- Current team: Retired
- Discipline: Road
- Role: Rider

Amateur teams
- 1988: Pinturas Philaac
- 2001–2009: Lotería de Boyacá
- 2010–2011: Boyacá es Para Vivirla–Orgullo de América

Professional teams
- 1992–1995: Gaseosas Glacial
- 1996: Glacial–Selle Italia
- 1997–1998: Lotería de Boyacá
- 1999–2000: Selle Italia

Israel Antonio Ochoa Plazas (born 26 August 1964) is a Colombian former professional racing cyclist. He was nicknamed El Rápido during his career.

== Major results ==
1991
1st Stage 6 Clásico RCN
1992
1st Stage 6 Vuelta al Táchira
1993
3rd Overall Vuelta a Colombia
1994
1st Stage 3 Vuelta a Colombia
1st Stages 5 & 12 Vuelta y Ruta de Mexico
1996
1st Overall Clásico RCN

1st Stage 1

1997
1st Overall Vuelta a Boyacá
1st Stage 2 Vuelta a Colombia
1998
1st Overall Vuelta a Cundinamarca
1st Stages 3a & 10 Vuelta a Guatemala
3rd Overall Clásico RCN

1st Prologue (TTT)

4th Overall Vuelta a Colombia
1999
3rd Overall Vuelta y Ruta de Mexico
5th Overall Vuelta a Colombia

1st Stage 13

2000
National Road Championships

1st Time trial
2nd Road race

2001
8th Overall Vuelta a Colombia
2002
1st Stage 4 Vuelta a Colombia
2003
2nd Overall Clasica del Meta

1st Stage 3

1st Overall Vuelta a Boyacá

1st Stage 5

3rd Time trial, National Road Championships
3rd Overall Clásica Nacional Ciudad de Anapoima
5th Overall Vuelta a Colombia
2004
National Road Championships

1st Road race
1st Time trial

1st Overall Vuelta a Costa Rica

1st Mountains classification
1st Stage 10

2nd Overall Doble Copacabana GP Fides

1st Stage 4

2005
1st Overall GP Mercanapro

1st Stage 1

1st Stage 3 Clasica del Meta
2nd Overall Vuelta a Antioquia

1st Stage 4

3rd Overall Vuelta a Boyacá

1st Stage 4

4th Overall Doble Copacabana GP Fides

1st Stages 3 (TTT) & 5b Doble Copacabana GP Fides

2006
1st Overall Vuelta a Boyacá

1st Stage 3

2007
1st Stages 7 & 8 Clásico RCN
1st Stage 2 Clásica Club Deportivo Boyacá
1st Stage 2 Vuelta a los Santanderes
3rd Time trial, National Road Championships
3rd Overall Vuelta a Colombia
2008
National Road Championships

1st Time trial
2nd Road race

1st Overall Clásica Aguazul
3rd Overall Clásica Ciudad de Girardot

1st Stage 1

2009
1st Overall Clásica Club Deportivo Boyacá

1st Stage 3

1st Stage 8 Clásico RCN
1st Stage 3 Vuelta a Santander
7th Overall Vuelta al Ecuador

1st Stage 8 (ITT)
