= Barrancabermeja =

- Municipality and city
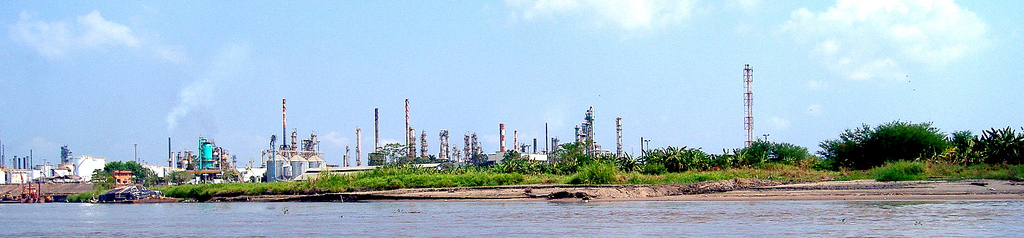

- Flag Coat of arms
- Nickname: Oil Capital of Colombia
- Location of the town and municipality of Barrancabermeja in the Santander Department

- Location in Colombia
- Coordinates: 7°04′N 73°51′W
- Country: Colombia
- Department: Santander
- Foundation: October 12, 1536
- Erection as City: April 22, 1922

Area
  - Municipality and city: 1,327 km^{2} (512 sq mi)
  - Urban: 32.4 km^{2} (12.5 sq mi)
- Elevation: 75 m (246 ft)

Population (2018 census)
  - Municipality and city: 203,537
  - Density: 153.4/km^{2} (397.3/sq mi)
  - Urban: 177,272
  - Urban density: 5,470/km^{2} (14,200/sq mi)
- Demonym: Barranqueño (a)
- Climate: Af
- Website: Official website (in Spanish)

Barrancabermeja (Spanish: [baraŋkaβeɾˈmexa]) is a municipality and city in Colombia, located on the shore of the Magdalena River, in the western part of the department of Santander. It is home to the largest oil refinery in the country, under direct management of ECOPETROL. Barrancabermeja is known as the Oil Capital of Colombia.

It is located 114 km west of Bucaramanga, on the banks of the Magdalena River in the Middle Magdalena region, which is the largest municipality and second in the entire department.

Barrancabermeja has high temperatures all year round. It is considered to be one of the hottest cities in Colombia. It is surrounded by water resources which make it very humid.

== History ==
On February 23, 2022, Barrancabermeja was affected by a 5.5 Richter Scale magnitude earthquake.

== Geography ==
Puerto Wilches lies to the north of Barrancabermeja; Puerto Parra and Simacota to the south; San Vicente de Chucuri and Giron to the southeast; and Magdalena River to the west. It is 116 km from Bucaramanga, the capital of Santander. The city is situated on the banks of the Magdalena River. In the past a Ferry service would cross between Santander and Antioquia, on the opposite side, where further oil fields are found. A bridge now spans the river at this location.

=== Climate ===
Barrancabermeja has a tropical monsoon climate (Am) with heavy rainfall in all months except January.

Climate data for Barrancabermeja (Yariguíes Airport), elevation 126 m (413 ft), (1981–2010)
Month	Jan	Feb	Mar	Apr	May	Jun	Jul	Aug	Sep	Oct	Nov	Dec	Year
Mean daily maximum °C (°F)	32.8 (91.0)	33.1 (91.6)	32.6 (90.7)	32.0 (89.6)	31.8 (89.2)	32.0 (89.6)	32.4 (90.3)	32.4 (90.3)	31.7 (89.1)	31.1 (88.0)	31.2 (88.2)	31.7 (89.1)	32.1 (89.7)
Daily mean °C (°F)	28.2 (82.8)	28.5 (83.3)	28.2 (82.8)	27.9 (82.2)	27.7 (81.9)	27.7 (81.9)	27.8 (82.0)	27.7 (81.9)	27.3 (81.1)	27.0 (80.6)	27.2 (81.0)	27.6 (81.7)	27.7 (81.9)
Mean daily minimum °C (°F)	23.6 (74.5)	23.8 (74.8)	23.8 (74.8)	23.7 (74.7)	23.5 (74.3)	23.4 (74.1)	23.2 (73.8)	23.1 (73.6)	22.9 (73.2)	23.0 (73.4)	23.3 (73.9)	23.5 (74.3)	23.4 (74.1)
Average precipitation mm (inches)	51.1 (2.01)	124.8 (4.91)	183.1 (7.21)	299.9 (11.81)	373.7 (14.71)	268.1 (10.56)	229.6 (9.04)	288.5 (11.36)	338.4 (13.32)	408.4 (16.08)	303.1 (11.93)	132.0 (5.20)	3,000.7 (118.14)
Average precipitation days	6.3	9.6	14.1	19.4	20.6	18.2	17.4	20.2	21.2	21.1	17.9	10.6	196.6
Average relative humidity (%)	73.9	73.3	76.6	81.0	81.7	80.8	78.0	78.6	80.8	82.9	83.1	79.7	79.2
Mean monthly sunshine hours	222.2	178.9	154.3	146.7	165.9	175.8	210.3	205.2	181.9	168.0	167.4	189.5	2,166.1
Mean daily sunshine hours	7.2	6.3	5.0	4.9	5.4	5.9	6.8	6.6	6.1	5.4	5.6	6.1	5.9
Source: Instituto de Hidrologia Meteorologia y Estudios Ambientales

== Culture ==
Barrancabermeja's culture has been largely affected by the migratory movements caused by the oil boom. The city exhibits an amalgam of many regional customs from Colombia. Due to its history as an oil town, the city is often visited by moneyed foreigners, often engineers and supervisory employees and technicians of oil companies. Thus Barrancabermeja has a reputation as an open and vibrant city and may be somewhat cosmopolitan.

Barrancabermeja's night life includes Salsa and merengue dance clubs. The city's culture presents a strong Caribbean influence that nevertheless is not exclusive of other cultural expressions from among the variety found in Colombia. The predominant music in the city is vallenato and other Caribbean rhythms including papayera.

Several local and national political organizations including unions, women's organizations, and human rights groups are active. Marches and demonstrations are quite common and the oil workers union is among the most important in the nation.

The commercial area of the city is adjacent to the river port ("the Port") where motor boats and canoes constantly arrive with fish and agricultural products from farmers along the river that include maize, cassava (or yuca in Spanish), plantain, and cacao.

In 1996 and 2000, Barrancabermeja hosted the Mundial de Patinaje, an international inline-skating competition.

== Transportation ==
The city is served by Yariguíes Airport.
