= Argiro Zapata =

Colombian cyclist (born 1971)

Personal information
- Born: June 14, 1971 (age 55) Medellín, Colombia

Cycling career
- Sport: Cycling
- Current team: Retired
- Role: Rider

Argiro Alberto Zapata Franco (born June 14, 1971 in Medellín) is a retired male professional road racing cyclist from Colombia.

== Career ==
1994
1st in General Classification Clásica Nacional Marco Fidel Suárez (COL)
1996
1st in General Classification Vuelta a Antioquia (COL)
1997
1st in Stage 9 Vuelta al Táchira (VEN)
2nd in General Classification Vuelta al Táchira (VEN)
6th in General Classification Vuelta a Venezuela (VEN)
1998
1st in General Classification Vuelta a los Santanderes (COL)
1st in Stage 3 Clásico RCN, Jardín (COL)
2nd in General Classification Clásico RCN (COL)
1999
6th in General Classification Clásico RCN (COL)
2002
2nd in General Classification Vuelta a Antioquia (COL)
1st in Stage 5 Vuelta a Boyacà, Toca (COL)
3rd in General Classification Vuelta a Boyacà (COL)
2003
3rd in General Classification Vuelta a las Americas (MEX)
1st in Stage 3 Vuelta de Higuito, Paraiso (CRC)
2nd in General Classification Vuelta de Higuito (CRC)
2004
6th in General Classification Clásico RCN (COL)
2nd in General Classification Clásica La Libertad (COL)
2nd in General Classification Vuelta de Higuito (CRC)
2nd in General Classification Vuelta a Chiriquí (PAN)
2007
1st in Stage 1 Vuelta a Antioquia, TTT, Medellin (COL)

alongside Francisco Colorado, Mauricio Ortega, Marlon Pérez, Marvin Correa, Juan Alejandro García, Ricardo Giraldo, and Andrés Rodríguez

1st in Stage 2 Clásica Nacional Marco Fidel Suárez, Cisneros (COL)
