= 2004 Clásico RCN =

Race details
- Dates: October 17 – October 24
- Stages: 7
- Distance: 1,119 km (695 mi)
- Winning time: 29h 56' 36"

Results
	Winner	Hernán Buenahora (COL)	(Cafés Baqué-Orbitel)
	Second	Félix Cárdenas (COL)	(Cafés Baqué-Orbitel)
	Third	Libardo Niño (COL)	(Lotería de Boyacá)
	Points	Deivi Ibañez (COL)	(Alcaldía Fusagasugá Ciudad)
	Mountains	Israel Ochoa (COL)	(Lotería de Boyacá)
	Youth	Mauricio Soler (COL)	(Chocolate Sol)
	Combination	Fredy González (COL)	(Selle Italia)
	Team	(Colombia) Cafés Baqué-Orbitel	

The 44th edition of the annual Clásico RCN was held from October 17 to October 24, 2004 in Colombia. The stage race started in Bucaramanga and finished with an individual time trial at the Alto del Escobero.

== Stages ==
=== 2004-10-17: Bucaramanga – Bucaramanga (6.8 km) ===
Place	Prologue		General Classification	
Place	Name	Time	Name	Time
1.	Hernán Buenahora (COL)	00:09.20	Hernán Buenahora (COL)	00:09.20
2.	José Castelblanco (COL)	+0.08	José Castelblanco (COL)	+0.08
3.	Urbelino Mesa (COL)	+0.09	Urbelino Mesa (COL)	+0.09

=== 2004-10-18: Socorro – Duitama (213 km) ===
Place	Stage 1		General Classification	
Place	Name	Time	Name	Time
1.	Fredy González (COL)	06:19.04	Hernán Buenahora (COL)	06:28.24
2.	Elder Herrera (COL)	—	José Castelblanco (COL)	+0.08
3.	Jhon García (COL)	—	Urbelino Mesa (COL)	+0.09

=== 2004-10-19: Duitama – Zipaquirá (173.6 km) ===
Place	Stage 2		General Classification	
Place	Name	Time	Name	Time
1.	Libardo Niño (COL)	04:22.53	Hernán Buenahora (COL)	10:51.17
2.	Fredy González (COL)	—	Libardo Niño (COL)	+0.02
3.	Jesús Sánchez (COL)	—	José Castelblanco (COL)	+0.08

=== 2004-10-20: Soacha – Ibagué (191.8 km) ===
Place	Stage 3		General Classification	
Place	Name	Time	Name	Time
1.	Álvaro Lozano (COL)	04:40.33	Hernán Buenahora (COL)	15:38.45
2.	Jorge Acosta (COL)	+5.15	Libardo Niño (COL)	+0.02
3.	Fernando Camargo (COL)	+5.57	José Castelblanco (COL)	+0.08

=== 2004-10-21: Ibagué – Buga (200 km) ===
Place	Stage 4		General Classification	
Place	Name	Time	Name	Time
1.	Félix Cárdenas (COL)	05:16.55	Félix Cárdenas (COL)	20:55.43
2.	Jairo Hernández (COL)	+0.59	Hernán Buenahora (COL)	+0.56
3.	Walter Pedraza (COL)	—	Libardo Niño (COL)	+0.58

=== 2004-10-22: Buga – Pereira (135.4 km) ===
Place	Stage 5		General Classification	
Place	Name	Time	Name	Time
1.	Javier Zapata (COL)	03:08.05	Félix Cárdenas (COL)	24:03.44
2.	Fredy González (COL)	—	Hernán Buenahora (COL)	+1.00
3.	Félix Cárdenas (COL)	—	Libardo Niño (COL)	+1.02

=== 2004-10-23: Dosquebradas – Sabaneta (191.6 km) ===
Place	Stage 6		General Classification	
Place	Name	Time	Name	Time
1.	Urbelino Mesa (COL)	05:16.36	Félix Cárdenas (COL)	29:11.42
2.	Hernán Buenahora (COL)	+1.26	Hernán Buenahora (COL)	+0.58
3.	Félix Cárdenas (COL)	—	Libardo Niño (COL)	+2.02

=== 2004-10-24: Envigado – Alto del Escobero (10.4 km) ===
Place	Stage 7 (Individual Time Trial)		General Classification	
Place	Name	Time	Name	Time
1.	Hernán Buenahora (COL)	00:33.56	Hernán Buenahora (COL)	29:56.36
2.	Félix Cárdenas (COL)	+1.07	Félix Cárdenas (COL)	+0.09
3.	Israel Ochoa (COL)	+1.54	Libardo Niño (COL)	+3.01

== Final classification ==
RANK	NAME	TEAM	TIME
1.	Hernán Buenahora (COL)	Cafés Baqué-Orbitel	29:56:36
2.	Félix Cárdenas (COL)	Cafés Baqué-Orbitel	+ 0.09
3.	Libardo Niño (COL)	EPM−Orbitel	+ 3.01
4.	José Castelblanco (COL)	EPM−Orbitel	+ 3.26
5.	Álvaro Sierra (COL)	EPM−Orbitel	+ 3.41
6.	Argiro Zapata (COL)	Aguardiente Antioqueño	+ 4.24
7.	Mauricio Soler (COL)	Chocolate Sol	+ 5.14
8.	Walter Pedraza (COL)	EPM−Orbitel	+ 5.25
9.	Alejandro Ramírez (COL)	Aguardiente Antioqueño	+ 5.42
10.	Javier Zapata (COL)	EPM−Orbitel	+ 8.10

== Teams ==
Cafés Baqué-Orbitel

1. (Colombia) José Castelblanco
2. (Colombia) Félix Cárdenas
3. (Colombia) Hernán Buenahora
4. (Colombia) Hernán Darío Muñoz
5. (Colombia) Heberth Gutiérrez
6. (Colombia) Jairo Hernández
7. (Colombia) Álvaro Sierra
8. (Colombia) Javier Zapata
9. (Colombia) Jhon García

Lotería de Boyacá-Servientrega

11. (Colombia) Libardo Niño
12. (Colombia) Víctor Niño
13. (Colombia) Israel Ochoa
14. (Colombia) Ricardo Mesa
15. (Colombia) Víctor Becerra
16. (Colombia) Jairo Pérez
17. (Colombia) Mauricio Neiza
18. (Colombia) Néstor Bernal

Gobernación de Norte de Santander-Selle Italia

21. (Colombia) Fredy González
22. (Venezuela) José Rujano
23. (Colombia) Álvaro Lozano
24. (Colombia) Urbelino Mesa
25. (Colombia) Alexis Castro
26. (Colombia) Freddy Paredes
27. (Colombia) Johnny Leal
28. (Colombia) Rolando Trujillo
29. (Colombia) Edisson Paredes

Aguardiente Antioqueño-Lotería de Medellín

31. (Colombia) Juan Diego Ramírez
32. (Colombia) Alejandro Ramírez
33. (Colombia) Argiro Zapata
34. (Colombia) Francisco Colorado
35. (Colombia) Héctor Mesa
36. (Colombia) Alexis Rojas
37. (Colombia) Elder Herrera
38. (Colombia) Óscar Álvarez
39. (Colombia) Diego Montoya

Inder Pereira-Indeportes Risaralda

41. (Colombia) Julián Andrés Rodas
42. (Colombia) Gerardo Ramírez
43. (Colombia) Vladimir Zapata
44. (Colombia) Juan Alejandro Botero
45. (Colombia) Ricadel Orozco
46. (Colombia) Albert Suárez
47. (Colombia) Leonel Bonilla

Chocolate Sol

51. (Colombia) Mauricio Soler
52. (Colombia) Jesús Albeiro Sánchez
53. (Colombia) Juan Alejandro García
54. (Bolivia) Horacio Gallardo
55. (Colombia) Fabio Montenegro
56. (Colombia) Edwin Parra

Cicloases Cundinamarca

61. (Colombia) José Ignacio Rodríguez
62. (Colombia) Gerson Sánchez
63. (Colombia) Rafael Montiel
64. (Colombia) Humberto Delgado
65. (Colombia) Carlos Albarracín
66. (Colombia) Gerardo Rodríguez
67. (Colombia) Mardoqueo Arteaga
68. (Colombia) Hugo Osorio

05 Orbitel

71. (Colombia) Fidel Chacón
72. (Colombia) Alejandro Cortés
73. (Colombia) Jorge Humberto Martínez
74. (Colombia) Olmedo Capacho
75. (Colombia) Óscar Mauricio Henao
76. (Colombia) Walter Pedraza

Servientrega-Lotería de Boyacá

81. (Colombia) Ismael Sarmiento
82. (Colombia) Miguel Ángel Sanabria
83. (Colombia) Iván Casas
84. (Colombia) Graciano Fonseca
85. (Colombia) Jorge Orlando Acosta

Equipo Mixto Antioquia

91. (Colombia) Edwin Orozco
92. (Colombia) Alexander Caño
93. (Colombia) Santo Álvarez
94. (Colombia) Héctor Ríos
95. (Colombia) William Muñoz

Equipo Mixto Boyacá-Cundinamarca

101. (Colombia) Víctor Julio Benítez
102. (Colombia) Emerson Bernal
103. (Colombia) Miguel Matta
104. (Colombia) Fabio Macheda
105. (Colombia) Édgar Fonseca
106. (Colombia) Deivy Ibáñez
107. (Colombia) William Rozo
108. (Colombia) Fernando Camargo

Equipo Mixto Regional

111. (Colombia) Arley Tabares
112. (Colombia) Juan Carlos Castro
113. (Colombia) Wilson Zambrano
114. (Colombia) Javier Torres
115. (Colombia) Hernán Darío Díaz
116. (Colombia) Giovanny Barriga
117. (Colombia) Vladimir González

== See also ==
- 2004 Vuelta a Colombia
