= 2003 Vuelta a Colombia =

2003 Vuelta a Colombia buscar livador Pérez Antonio Rodríguez
Race details
- Dates: June 16–30, 2003
- Stages: 15
- Distance: 2,200 km (1,400 mi)
- Winning time: 56h 14' 59"

Results
	Winner	Libardo Niño (COL)	(Lotería de Boyacá)
	Second	Félix Cárdenas (COL)	(05 Orbitel)
	Third	Álvaro Sierra (COL)	(Aguardiente Antioqueño)
	Points	Libardo Niño (COL)	(Lotería de Boyacá)
	Mountains	Félix Cárdenas (COL)	(05 Orbitel)
	Young rider	Mauricio Ortega (COL)	(Epmnet)
	Team	(Colombia) Lotería de Boyacá	

The 53rd edition of the Vuelta a Colombia was held from June 16 to June 30, 2003. The cycling race took place over fifteen stages (including a prologue) and 2,200 kilometres.

== Stages ==
=== 2003-06-16: El Rodadero — Santa Marta (6.6 km) ===
- Prologue was cancelled

=== 2003-06-17: Santa Marta — Cartagena (225 km) ===
Place	Stage 1		General Classification	
Place	Name	Time	Name	Time
1.	John Parra (COL)	5:30.15	John Parra (COL)	3:31.34
2.	Gil Cordovés (CUB)	+7.37	Gil Cordovés (CUB)	+7.41
3.	Diocenes Valdés (VEN)	—	Diocenes Valdés (VEN)	+7.43

=== 2003-06-18: Cartagena — Sincelejo (182 km) ===
Place	Stage 2		General Classification	
Place	Name	Time	Name	Time
1.	Santos Álvarez (COL)	5:30.15	John Parra (COL)	10:20.32
2.	Diocenes Valdés (VEN)	+0.38	Santos Álvarez (COL)	+6.54
3.	Marlon Pérez Arango (COL)	—	Diocenes Valdés (VEN)	+7.35

=== 2003-06-19: Sincelejo — Caucasia (192 km) ===
Place	Stage 3		General Classification	
Place	Name	Time	Name	Time
1.	Gil Cordovés (CUB)	4:17.19	John Parra (COL)	14:37.51
2.	Alejandro Cortés (COL)	—	Santos Álvarez (COL)	+6.54
3.	Diocenes Valdés (VEN)	—	Gil Cordovés (CUB)	+7.28

=== 2003-06-20: Caucasia — Yarumal (165 km) ===
Place	Stage 4		General Classification	
Place	Name	Time	Name	Time
1.	Daniel Rincón (COL)	4:48.51	Daniel Rincón (COL)	19:34.19
2.	Javier Zapata (COL)	+0.31	Javier Zapata (COL)	+0.35
3.	Libardo Niño (COL)	—	Libardo Niño (COL)	+0.37

=== 2003-06-21: Yarumal — El Escobero (154 km) ===
Place	Stage 5		General Classification	
Place	Name	Time	Name	Time
1.	Libardo Niño (COL)	3:37.33	Libardo Niño (COL)	23:12.19
2.	Álvaro Sierra (COL)	+0.18	Daniel Rincón (COL)	+0.04
3.	Daniel Rincón (COL)	+0.35	Álvaro Sierra (COL)	+0.38

=== 2003-06-22: Barbosa — Puerto Berrío (147 km) ===
Place	Stage 6		General Classification	
Place	Name	Time	Name	Time
1.	Hernán Bonilla (COL)	3:23.49	Libardo Niño (COL)	26:37.05
2.	Jeobany Chacón (COL)	—	Daniel Rincón (COL)	+0.04
3.	Mauricio Ardila (COL)	+0.57	Álvaro Sierra (COL)	+0.38

=== 2003-06-23: Piedecuesta — Barichara (132 km) ===
Place	Stage 7		General Classification	
Place	Name	Time	Name	Time
1.	Félix Cárdenas (COL)	3:33.26	Libardo Niño (COL)	30:11.29
2.	Javier Zapata (COL)	+0.54	Daniel Rincón (COL)	+0.07
3.	Alejandro Cortés (COL)	+0.58	Álvaro Sierra (COL)	+0.38

=== 2003-06-24: Socorro — Duitama (224 km) ===
Place	Stage 8		General Classification	
Place	Name	Time	Name	Time
1.	Alejandro Cortés (COL)	5:57.41	Libardo Niño (COL)	36:09.19
2.	Urbelino Mesa (COL)	—	Daniel Rincón (COL)	+0.07
3.	Víctor Becerra (COL)	—	Álvaro Sierra (COL)	+0.41

=== 2003-06-25: Duitama — Sopó (168 km) ===
Place	Stage 9		General Classification	
Place	Name	Time	Name	Time
1.	Carlos Andrés Ibáñez (COL)		Libardo Niño (COL)	36:09.19
2.	Juan Antonio Barrero (COL)		Daniel Rincón (COL)	+0.07
3.	Javier Zapata (COL)		Álvaro Sierra (COL)	+0.41

=== 2003-06-26: Soacha — Ibagué (197 km) ===
Place	Stage 10		General Classification	
Place	Name	Time	Name	Time
1.	Oscar Álvarez (COL)	4:31.43	Libardo Niño (COL)	45:08.22
2.	Jorge Humberto Martínez (COL)	+4.10	Daniel Rincón (COL)	+0.10
3.	Edilberto Suárez (COL)	—	Álvaro Sierra (COL)	+0.44

=== 2003-06-27: Ibagué — Santa Rosa de Cabal (145 km) ===
Place	Stage 11		General Classification	
Place	Name	Time	Name	Time
1.	Félix Cárdenas (COL)	3:58.30	Libardo Niño (COL)	49:07.07
2.	Libardo Niño (COL)	+0.22	Daniel Rincón (COL)	+0.22
3.	Israel Ochoa (COL)	+0.24	Álvaro Sierra (COL)	+0.50

=== 2003-06-28: Cartago — La Unión (47.2 km) ===
Place	Stage 12		General Classification	
Place	Name	Time	Name	Time
1.	Heberth Gutiérrez (COL)	0:56.26	Libardo Niño (COL)	50:04.29
2.	Félix Cárdenas (COL)	+0.09	Daniel Rincón (COL)	+2.26
3.	Javier Zapata (COL)	+0.39	Félix Cárdenas (COL)	+2.39

=== 2003-06-29: Tuluá — Kilómetro 18 (163 km) ===
Place	Stage 13		General Classification	
Place	Name	Time	Name	Time
1.	Urbelino Mesa (COL)	3:47.58	Libardo Niño (COL)	53:53.29
2.	Álvaro Sierra (COL)	+0.43	Félix Cárdenas (COL)	+2.36
3.	Israel Ochoa (COL)	+1.02	Álvaro Sierra (COL)	+3.28

=== 2003-06-30: Circuito en Cali (99 km) ===
Place	Stage 14		General Classification	
Place	Name	Time	Name	Time
1.	Hernán Bonilla (COL)	2:17.02	Libardo Niño (COL)	56:14.59
2.	Oved Ramírez (COL)	—	Félix Cárdenas (COL)	+2.36
3.	Alexis Rojas (COL)	—	Álvaro Sierra (COL)	+3.28

== Jersey progression ==
Stage	Winner	General classification	Points classification	Mountains classification	Youth classification
1	John Parra	John Parra	John Parra	Alexánder Roa	Leonardo Duque
2	Santos Álvarez	John Parra	Diocenes Valdés	Geovanny Chacón	Leonardo Duque
3	Gil Cordovés	John Parra	Diocenes Valdés	Geovanny Chacón	Leonardo Duque
4	Daniel Rincón	Daniel Rincón	Diocenes Valdés	Libardo Niño	Mauricio Ortega
5	Libardo Niño	Libardo Niño	Javier Zapata	Libardo Niño	Mauricio Ortega
6	Hernán Bonilla	Libardo Niño	Javier Zapata	Libardo Niño	Mauricio Ortega
7	Félix Cárdenas	Libardo Niño	Javier Zapata	Daniel Rincón	Mauricio Ortega
8	Alejandro Cortés	Libardo Niño	Javier Zapata	Daniel Rincón	Mauricio Ortega
9	Carlos Andrés Ibáñez	Libardo Niño	Javier Zapata	Daniel Rincón	Mauricio Ortega
10	Oscar Álvarez	Libardo Niño	Javier Zapata	Daniel Rincón	Mauricio Ortega
11	Félix Cárdenas	Libardo Niño	Libardo Niño	Daniel Rincón	Mauricio Ortega
12	Heberth Gutiérrez	Libardo Niño	Libardo Niño	Daniel Rincón	Mauricio Ortega
13	Urbelino Mesa	Libardo Niño	Libardo Niño	Félix Cárdenas	Mauricio Ortega
14	Hernán Bonilla	Libardo Niño	Libardo Niño	Félix Cárdenas	Mauricio Ortega

== Final classification ==
RANK	NAME	TEAM	TIME
1.	Libardo Niño (COL)	Lotería de Boyacá	56:14:59
2.	Félix Cárdenas (COL)	05 Orbitel	+ 2.36
3.	Álvaro Sierra (COL)	Aguardiente Antioqueño	+ 3.28
4.	Daniel Rincón (COL)	Lotería de Boyacá	+ 3.36
5.	Israel Ochoa (COL)	Lotería de Boyacá	+ 3.37
6.	Urbelino Mesa (COL)	Colombia Selle Italia	+ 6.53
7.	Víctor González (COL)	Alcaldía de Cabimas	+ 8.51
8.	Ismael Sarmiento (COL)	Lotería de Boyacá	+ 10.41
9.	Javier Zapata (COL)	05 Orbitel	+ 12.41
10.	Heberth Gutiérrez (COL)	05 Orbitel	+ 13.03

== Teams ==
Colombia — Selle Italia

1. (Colombia) José Castelblanco
2. (Colombia) Edilberto Suárez
3. (Colombia) Carlos Andrés Ibáñez
4. (Colombia) Vladimir González
5. (Colombia) Jhon García
6. (Colombia) Urbelino Mesa
7. (Colombia) Oscar Henao
8. (Colombia) Ruber Marín
9. (Colombia) Hernán Darío Muñoz
10. (Colombia) Freddy Paredes

05 Orbitel A

11. (Colombia) Hernán Buenahora
12. (Colombia) Félix Cárdenas
13. (Colombia) Carlos Contreras
14. (Colombia) Marlon Pérez
15. (Colombia) Jairo Hernández
16. (Colombia) Hernán Bonilla
17. (Colombia) Javier Zapata
18. (Colombia) Javier González
19. (Colombia) Elder Herrera
20. (Colombia) Heberth Gutiérrez

Lotería de Boyacá

21. (Colombia) Daniel Rincón
22. (Colombia) Ismael Sarmiento
23. (Colombia) Israel Ochoa
24. (Colombia) Graciano Fonseca
25. (Colombia) Libardo Niño
26. (Colombia) Jairo Pérez
27. (Colombia) Miguel Ángel Sanabria
28. (Colombia) Giovanny Huertas
29. (Colombia) Giovanny Báez
30. (Colombia) Carlos Blanco

Aguardiente Antioqueño

31. (Colombia) Óscar Álvarez
32. (Colombia) Mauricio Ardila
33. (Colombia) Fidel Chacón
34. (Colombia) John Parra
35. (Colombia) John Gilberto Durango
36. (Colombia) Leonardo Duque
37. (Colombia) Juan Diego Ramírez
38. (Colombia) Álvaro Sierra
39. (Colombia) Argiro Zapata
40. (Colombia) Oved Ramírez

Juegos Nacionales 2004

41. (Colombia) Víctor Herrera
42. (Colombia) Alexis Rojas
43. (Colombia) Juan Barrero
44. (Colombia) José Ignacio Rodríguez
45. (Colombia) Gerardo Rodríguez
46. (Colombia) José Luis Vanegas
47. (Colombia) Edward Ruiz
48. (Colombia) Rigoberto Ibáñez
49. (Colombia) Javier Guerrero
50. (Colombia) Alexánder Roa

Lotería del Táchira

51. (Venezuela) Noel Vasquez
52. (Venezuela) César Salazar
53. (Venezuela) Aldrin Salamanca
54. (Venezuela) Carlos Maya
55. (Venezuela) José Chacón Díaz
56. (Venezuela) John Nava
57. (Colombia) Yeison Delgado
58. (Venezuela) Diocenes Valdés

Ecuador National Team

61. (Ecuador) Héctor Chiles
62. (Ecuador) Juan Montenegro
63. (Ecuador) Mariño Delgado
64. (Ecuador) Byron Chulde
65. (Ecuador) Erick Castaño
66. (Ecuador) Wálter Tapia
67. (Ecuador) Wilson Paneluisa
68. (Ecuador) José Ruiz

Gobernación del Zulia

71. (Colombia) Álvaro Lozano
72. (Colombia) Julio César Rangel
73. (Colombia) Víctor Hugo González
74. (Colombia) Raúl Saavedra
75. (Venezuela) Manuel Medina
76. (Venezuela) Carlos Ochoa
77. (Venezuela) Víctor Becerra
78. (Cuba) Gil Cordovés
79. (Venezuela) Nélson Gélvez

05 Orbitel B

81. (Colombia) Johnny Leal
82. (Colombia) Luis Castañeda
83. (Colombia) Olmedo Capacho
84. (Colombia) Jorge Humberto Martínez
85. (Colombia) Julio César Aguirre
86. (Colombia) Alejandro Cortés

Mixto Uno — Gobernación de Boyacá

91. (Colombia) Victor Niño
92. (Colombia) Hugo Osorio
93. (Colombia) Víctor Becerra
94. (Colombia) Néstor Bernal
95. (Colombia) Gustavo Vargas
96. (Colombia) Jorge Andrés Moreno
97. (Colombia) Ferney Naranjo

Mixto Dos — EPM.net

101. (Colombia) Mauricio Ortega
102. (Colombia) Arles Castro
103. (Colombia) Francisco Colorado
104. (Colombia) Gerson Sánchez
105. (Colombia) Luis Alberto Gil
106. (Colombia) Giovanny Barriga

Mixto Tres — Sucre — Cicloases

111. (Colombia) Tony Salgado
112. (Colombia) Frank Salgado
113. (Colombia) Nélson Méndez
114. (Colombia) Alfredo Rodríguez
115. (Colombia) José Talero
116. (Colombia) Marco Javier Vega

Ciclo Acosta Bello

121. (Colombia) Alexander González
122. (Colombia) Edwárd Ortíz
123. (Colombia) Nélson Vargas
124. (Colombia) Juan Pablo Rivera
125. (Colombia) Darío Alberto Vargas
126. (Colombia) Daniel Rendón
127. (Colombia) Santo Álvarez
128. (Colombia) Luis Cely

== See also ==
- 2003 Clásico RCN
