= 2006 Vuelta a Colombia =

2005–2006 UCI America Tour

Race details
- Dates: August 5–20, 2006
- Stages: 15
- Distance: 1,905 km (1,184 mi)
- Winning time: 46h 40' 42"

Results
Jersey awarded to the overall winner	Winner	José Castelblanco (COL)	(Gob.Zulia Alc. Cabimas)
	Second	Daniel Rincón (COL)	(Orbitel-EPM)
	Third	Álvaro Sierra (COL)	(Lotería de Boyacá)
	Points	Fredy González (COL)	(Gob.Norte Sant.Selle Italia)
	Mountains	Fabio Montenegro (COL)	(Frugos Del Valle)
	Team	Lotería de Boyacá	

The 56th edition of the Vuelta a Colombia was held from August 5 to August 20, 2006.

== Stages ==
=== 2006-08-05: Táriba — San Cristóbal (19.8 km) ===
Place	Stage 1 (Individual Time Trial)		General Classification	
Place	Name	Time	Name	Time
1.	Libardo Niño (COL)	27.44	Libardo Niño (COL)	27.44
2.	Fabio Duarte (COL)	+0.21	Fabio Duarte (COL)	+0.21
3.	José Castelblanco (COL)	+0.41	José Castelblanco (COL)	+0.41

=== 2006-08-06: Circuito San Cristóbal (144 km) ===
Place	Stage 2		General Classification	
Place	Name	Time	Name	Time
1.	Alejandro Cortés (COL)	3:20.11	Libardo Niño (COL)	3:47.56
2.	Jackson Rodríguez (VEN)	+0.01	Fabio Duarte (COL)	+0.21
3.	Juan Murillo (VEN)	+0.01	José Castelblanco (COL)	+0.41

=== 2006-08-07: San Cristóbal — Pamplona (133 km) ===
Place	Stage 3		General Classification	
Place	Name	Time	Name	Time
1.	Javier González (COL)	3:59.55	Libardo Niño (COL)	7:48.18
2.	José Castelblanco (COL)	+0.04	Fabio Duarte (COL)	+0.04
3.	Hernán Buenahora (COL)	+0.10	José Castelblanco (COL)	+0.12

=== 2006-08-08: Piedecuesta — San Gil (113.5 km) ===
Place	Stage 4		General Classification	
Place	Name	Time	Name	Time
1.	Jhon García (COL)	3:00.55	Heberth Gutiérrez (COL)	10:49.59
2.	Heberth Gutiérrez (COL)	—	Jhon García (COL)	+0.56
3.	Edwin Parra (COL)	+1.45	Fabio Duarte (COL)	+1.03

=== 2006-08-09: San Gil — Tunja (183.3 km) ===
Place	Stage 5		General Classification	
Place	Name	Time	Name	Time
1.	Manuel Medina (VEN)	5:19.47	Heberth Gutiérrez (COL)	16:12.08
2.	Giovanny Báez (COL)	—	Jhon García (COL)	+0.56
3.	Héctor Mesa (COL)	+1.45	Fabio Duarte (COL)	+1.03

=== 2006-08-10: Circuito del Sol y del Acero Sogamoso (159.2 km) ===
Place	Stage 6		General Classification	
Place	Name	Time	Name	Time
1.	Juan Pablo Forero (COL)	3:22.00	Heberth Gutiérrez (COL)	19:38.39
2.	Edgardo Simón (ARG)	—	Jhon García (COL)	+0.56
3.	Rónald González (VEN)	—	Fabio Duarte (COL)	+1.03

=== 2006-08-12: Madrid — Ibagué (203.6 km) ===
Place	Stage 7		General Classification	
Place	Name	Time	Name	Time
1.	Walter Pedraza (COL)	4:46.05	Heberth Gutiérrez (COL)	24:30.18
2.	Rafael Montiel (COL)	—	Jhon García (COL)	+0.56
3.	Freddy Piamonte (COL)	—	Fabio Duarte (COL)	+1.03

=== 2006-08-13: Ibagué — Armenia (114.1 km) ===
Place	Stage 8		General Classification	
Place	Name	Time	Name	Time
1.	Álvaro Sierra (COL)	3:06.56	Fabio Duarte (COL)	27:38.54
2.	Fredy González (COL)	+0.40	José Castelblanco (COL)	+0.11
3.	Edwin Parra (COL)	—	Hernán Buenahora (COL)	+0.31

=== 2006-08-14: Armenia — Cali (185 km) ===
Place	Stage 9		General Classification	
Place	Name	Time	Name	Time
1.	Carlos Andrés Ibáñez (COL)	3:53.38	Fabio Duarte (COL)	31:32.34
2.	José Chacón Díaz (VEN)	+0.02	José Castelblanco (COL)	+0.11
3.	Juan Wilches (COL)	—	Hernán Buenahora (COL)	+0.31

=== 2006-08-15: Palmira — Buga (47.8 km) ===
Place	Stage 10 (Time Team Trial)		General Classification	
Place	Name	Time	Name	Time
1.	EPM-Orbitel	54.01	Fabio Duarte (COL)	32:26.35
2.	Gob.Zulia Alc. Cabimas Ven. A	+0.42	José Castelblanco (COL)	+0.26
3.	Gob.Norte Sant. Selle Italia	+0.46	Hernán Buenahora (COL)	+0.46

=== 2006-08-16: Buga — Cartago (139.6 km) ===
Place	Stage 11		General Classification	
Place	Name	Time	Name	Time
1.	Juan Pablo Forero (COL)	2:54.06	Fabio Duarte (COL)	35:20.41
2.	Jackson Rodríguez (VEN)	—	José Castelblanco (COL)	+0.26
3.	Fredy González (COL)	—	Hernán Buenahora (COL)	+0.46

=== 2006-08-17: Santa Rosa de Cabal — Ciudad Bolívar (192.8 km) ===
Place	Stage 12		General Classification	
Place	Name	Time	Name	Time
1.	José Serpa (COL)	4:21.23	Fabio Duarte (COL)	39:43.53
2.	Franklin Chacón (VEN)	+0.01	José Castelblanco (COL)	+0.26
3.	Rodolfo Camacho (COL)	+0.24	Hernán Buenahora (COL)	+0.46

=== 2006-08-18: Ciudad Bolívar — Medellín Pueblito Paisa (150.6 km) ===
Place	Stage 13		General Classification	
Place	Name	Time	Name	Time
1.	Hernán Buenahora (COL)	3:53.41	José Castelblanco (COL)	43:37.53
2.	José Castelblanco (COL)	—	Hernán Buenahora (COL)	+0.14
3.	Israel Ochoa (COL)	+0.02	Daniel Rincón (COL)	+0.47

=== 2006-08-19: Envigado — Alto del Escobero (10.7 km) ===
Place	Stage 14 (Individual Time Trial)		General Classification	
Place	Name	Time	Name	Time
1.	Hernán Buenahora (COL)	34.35	Hernán Buenahora (COL)	44:12.42
2.	Álvaro Sierra (COL)	+0.23	José Castelblanco (COL)	+0.46
3.	Fabio Duarte (COL)	+0.56	Daniel Rincón (COL)	+2.56

=== 2006-08-20: Circuito Medellín (108 km) ===
Place	Stage 15		General Classification	
Place	Name	Time	Name	Time
1.	Juan Pablo Forero (COL)	2:27.14	José Castelblanco (COL)	46:40.42
2.	Edgardo Simón (ARG)	—	Daniel Rincón (COL)	+2.10
3.	Jackson Rodríguez (VEN)	—	Álvaro Sierra (COL)	+2.51

== Jersey progression ==
Stage	Winner	General classification	Points classification	Mountains classification	Youth classification
1	Libardo Niño	Libardo Niño	Libardo Niño	unknown	unknown
2	Alejandro Cortés	Libardo Niño	Alejandro Cortés	unknown	unknown
3	Javier González	Libardo Niño	José Castelblanco	unknown	unknown
4	Jhon García	Heberth Gutiérrez	José Castelblanco	unknown	unknown
5	Manuel Medina	Heberth Gutiérrez	José Castelblanco	unknown	unknown
6	Juan Pablo Forero	Heberth Gutiérrez	José Castelblanco	Giovanny Báez	unknown
7	Walter Pedraza	Heberth Gutiérrez	José Castelblanco	Fabio Montenegro	unknown
8	Álvaro Sierra	Fabio Duarte	Edwin Parra	Fabio Montenegro	unknown
9	Carlos Andrés Ibáñez	Fabio Duarte	Hernán Buenahora	Fabio Montenegro	unknown
10	EPM-Orbitel	Fabio Duarte	Hernán Buenahora	Fabio Montenegro	unknown
11	Juan Pablo Forero	Fabio Duarte	Fredy González	Fabio Montenegro	unknown
12	José Serpa	Fabio Duarte	Fredy González	Fabio Montenegro	unknown
13	Hernán Buenahora	José Castelblanco	Fredy González	Fabio Montenegro	unknown
14	Hernán Buenahora	Hernán Buenahora	Fredy González	Fabio Montenegro	unknown
15	Juan Pablo Forero	José Castelblanco	Fredy González	Fabio Montenegro	unknown

== Final classification ==
RANK	NAME	TEAM	TIME
1.	José Castelblanco (COL) (Note: Stage 14 leader Hernán Buenahora failed a medical control before the last stage, and was not allowed to take part.)	Gobernación del Zulia-Alcaldía de Cabimas	46:40:42
2.	Daniel Rincón (COL)	Orbitel-EPM	+ 2.10
3.	Álvaro Sierra (COL)	Lotería de Boyacá	+ 2.51
4.	Fabio Duarte (COL)	Orbitel-EPM	+ 4.13
5.	Javier González (COL)	Orbitel-EPM	+ 7.44
6.	Juan Diego Ramírez (COL)	Orbitel-EPM	+ 8.22
7.	Edwin Parra (COL)	Orbitel-EPM	+ 8.38
8.	Jairo Hernández (COL)	Colombia es Pasion	+ 15.07
9.	Libardo Niño (COL)	Lotería de Boyacá	+ 19.35
10.	Javier Zapata (COL)	Orbitel-EPM	+ 21.51

== Teams ==
Lotería de Boyacá — Coordinadora

- Director Deportivo: José Alfonso "El Pollo" López
1. (Colombia) Libardo Niño
2. (Colombia) Álvaro Sierra
3. (Colombia) Víctor Niño
4. (Colombia) Israel Ochoa
5. (Colombia) Freddy Piamonte
6. (Colombia) Freddy Montaña
7. (Colombia) Iván Casas
8. (Colombia) Jairo Pérez
9. (Colombia) Graciano Fonseca

EPM — Orbitel

- Director Técnico: Raúl Mesa
11. (Colombia) Daniel Rincón
12. (Colombia) Javier Alberto González
13. (Colombia) Javier Zapata
14. (Colombia) Heberth Gutiérrez
15. (Colombia) Jhon García
16. (Colombia) Fabio Duarte
17. (Colombia) Edwin Parra
18. (Colombia) Juan Diego Ramírez
19. (Colombia) Alejandro Cortés

Gobernación del Zulia — Alcaldia de Cabimas

21. (Colombia) Hernán Buenahora
22. (Colombia) José Castelblanco
23. (Colombia) Nelson Galvez
24. (Venezuela) Manuel Medina
25. (Colombia) Raúl Saavedra
26. (Colombia) Paul Torres
27. (Colombia) Víctor Moreno
28. (Colombia) Adelso Valero
29. (Colombia) Manuel Palencia

Colombia es Pasión — Coldeportes

- Director Deportivo: Jairo Monroy Gutiérrez
31. (Colombia) Jairo Hernández
32. (Colombia) Alexis Rojas
33. (Colombia) Giovanny Torres
34. (Colombia) Robinson Chalapud
35. (Colombia) Olmedo Capacho
36. (Colombia) Francisco Colorado
37. (Colombia) Diego Montoya
38. (Colombia) Luis Castañeda
39. (Colombia) Juan Pablo Forero

Gobernacíon Norte de Santander — Selle Italia

41. (Colombia) José Serpa
42. (Colombia) Walter Pedraza
43. (Colombia) Alexander Giraldo
44. (Colombia) Fredy González
45. (Colombia) Freddy Paredes
46. (Colombia) Huberlino Mesa
47. (Colombia) Rolando Trujillo
48. (Argentina) Edgardo Simón

Lotería del Táchira

51. (Venezuela) César Salazar
52. (Venezuela) Carlos Maya
53. (Venezuela) Aldrin Salamanca
54. (Venezuela) José Chacón Díaz
55. (Venezuela) Rónald González
56. (Colombia) Rodolfo Camacho
57. (Venezuela) Jackson Rodríguez
58. (Venezuela) Franklin Chacón
59. (Venezuela) Juan Murillo

Atom — Azpiru

61. (Colombia) Giovanny Báez
62. (Colombia) Carlos Ibañez
63. (Colombia) Mauricio Ortega
64. (Colombia) Arles Tabares
65. (Colombia) Diego Tamayo
66. (Colombia) Fabio Mahecha
67. (Spain) Mikel Gaztañaga
68. (Spain) Gaizka Lasa
69. (Colombia) Luis Moyano
70. (Spain) Mikel Azparren

Frutidelicias Frugos del Valle

- Director Deportivo: William Palacio
71. (Colombia) Fabio Montenegro
72. (Colombia) Deiby Ibáñez
73. (Colombia) Giovanny Barriga
74. (Colombia) José Ibáñez
75. (Colombia) Diego Calderón
76. (Colombia) Leonel Bonilla
77. (Colombia) Edwin Sandoval
78. (Colombia) Harvey Hernández
79. (Colombia) Franklin López

Coordinadora

81. (Colombia) Ricardo Mesa
82. (Colombia) Víctor Becerra
83. (Colombia) Alejandro Serna
84. (Colombia) Miguel Ángel Sanabria
85. (Colombia) Jhon Martínez
86. (Colombia) Arles Castro
87. (Colombia) Marvin Correa
88. (Colombia) Orlando Acosta
89. (Colombia) Alex Rojas

Indeportes Boyacá — Alcaldia de Paipa

91. (Colombia) Fernando Camargo
92. (Colombia) Nestor Bernal
93. (Colombia) Héctor Barrera
94. (Colombia) Jefferson Vargas
95. (Colombia) Emiro Matta
96. (Colombia) Santiago Ojeda
97. (Colombia) Fabio Gordillo
98. (Colombia) Dario Sierra
99. (Colombia) Félix Castro

Idermeta

101. (Colombia) Farid Turriago
102. (Colombia) Juan Castro
103. (Colombia) Jonathan Méndez
104. (Colombia) Julian Perdomo
105. (Colombia) Aldo Valero
106. (Colombia) Alfredo López
107. (Colombia) Milton Ramos
108. (Colombia) Walter Guerra
109. (Colombia) Alexander Espitia

Coldeportes

111. (Colombia) Darwin González
112. (Colombia) Manuel Mayorga
113. (Colombia) Gerardo Rodríguez
114. (Colombia) Jairo Salas
115. (Colombia) Rafael Montiel
116. (Colombia) Alexis Castro
117. (Colombia) Carlos Alzate
118. (Colombia) Wilson Zambrano

Orbitel — EPM

- Director Deportivo: Carlos Jaramillo
121. (Colombia) Héctor Mesa
122. (Colombia) Julian Rodas
123. (Colombia) Rubén Laverde
124. (Colombia) Oscar Álvarez
125. (Colombia) Stiven Ortíz
126. (Colombia) Juan Botero
127. (Colombia) Juan Pablo Wilches
128. (Colombia) Norberto Wilches

Postal Express — Liga Bogotá

131. (Colombia) Gerson Sánchez
132. (Colombia) Fabian Rincón
133. (Colombia) Dairo Rodríguez
134. (Colombia) Freddy Guerrero
135. (Colombia) Jesús Andrés Cruz
136. (Colombia) Elver Garay
137. (Colombia) Miguel Cendales
138. (Colombia) Roger Lasso
139. (Colombia) Camilo Torres

Canal V.O.S — Cicloases

141. (Colombia) Carlos Vargas
142. (Colombia) Edgar Riaño
143. (Colombia) Ferney Baena
144. (Colombia) Santos Álvarez
145. (Colombia) Edgar Restrepo
146. (Colombia) Rito López
147. (Colombia) José Daniel Sánchez

== See also ==
- 2006 Clásico RCN
