= 2008 Clásico RCN =

Race details
- Dates: October 19–26
- Stages: 9
- Distance: 1,345.8 km (836.2 mi)
- Winning time: 32h 49' 53"

Results
	Winner	Óscar Sevilla (ESP)	(Alcaldía de Tunja)
	Second	Mauricio Ortega (COL)	(UNE-Orbitel)
	Third	Juan Carlos López (COL)	(UNE-Orbitel)
	Points	Juan Alejandro García (COL)	(GWS)
	Mountains	Graciano Fonseca (COL)	(Lotería de Boyacá)
	Team	UNE-Orbitel	

The 48th edition of the annual Clásico RCN was held from October 19 to October 26, 2008, in Colombia. The stage race with an UCI rate of 2.3 started with a time trial on the island San Andrés and finished in Cali.

== Stages ==
=== 2008-10-19: San Andrés – San Andrés (30.9 km) ===
Place	Stage 1 (Team Time Trial)		General Classification	
Place	Name	Time	Name	Time
1.	Alcaldía de Tunja	00:26.58	Óscar Sevilla (ESP)	00:26.58
2.	Lotería de Boyacá	+0.07	Félix Cárdenas (COL)	—
3.	GW-Shimano-EPM	+0.08		

=== 2008-10-19: Circuito en San Andrés (90 km) ===
Place	Stage 2		General Classification	
Place	Name	Time	Name	Time
1.	Félix Cárdenas (COL)	02:15.32	Félix Cárdenas (COL)	02:42.29
2.	William Aranzazu (COL)	—	Óscar Sevilla (ESP)	+0.11
3.	Weimar Roldán (COL)	—	José Bernal (COL)	—

=== 2008-10-20: Zipaquirá – Arcabuco (168 km) ===
Place	Stage 3		General Classification	
Place	Name	Time	Name	Time
1.	Javier González (COL)	04:05.08	Félix Cárdenas (COL)	06:45.22
2.	Luis Felipe Laverde (COL)	—	Javier González (COL)	+0.09
3.	Félix Cárdenas (COL)	—	Óscar Sevilla (ESP)	+0.16

=== 2008-10-21: Ventaquemada – Girardot (238.9 km) ===
Place	Stage 4		General Classification	
Place	Name	Time	Name	Time
1.	Juan Pablo Forero (COL)	05:09.18	Félix Cárdenas (COL)	11:56.40
2.	Jhon García (COL)	—	Javier González (COL)	+0.13
3.	Félix Cárdenas (COL)	—	Óscar Sevilla (ESP)	+0.19

=== 2008-10-22: Girardot – Armenia (162.2 km) ===
Place	Stage 5		General Classification	
Place	Name	Time	Name	Time
1.	Mauricio Ortega (COL)	04:39.47	Mauricio Ortega (COL)	16:35.35
2.	Óscar Sevilla (ESP)	+0.35	Óscar Sevilla (ESP)	+0.24
3.	Giovanny Báez (COL)	—	Giovanny Báez (COL)	+0.41

=== 2008-10-23: Santa Rosa de Cabal – Bello (206.8 km) ===
Place	Stage 6		General Classification	
Place	Name	Time	Name	Time
1.	Alex Caño (COL)	05:13.53	Mauricio Ortega (COL)	21:51.21
2.	Luis Felipe Laverde (COL)	+1.41	Óscar Sevilla (ESP)	+0.20
3.	Óscar Sevilla (ESP)	+1.42	Giovanny Báez (COL)	+0.41

=== 2008-10-24: Sabaneta – Manizales (177.2 km) ===
Place	Stage 7		General Classification	
Place	Name	Time	Name	Time
1.	Fernando Camargo (COL)	05:02.38	Óscar Sevilla (ESP)	26:56.18
2.	Víctor Niño (COL)	+1.02	Mauricio Ortega (COL)	+0.15
3.	Óscar Sevilla (ESP)	—	Fernando Camargo (COL)	+0.34

=== 2008-10-25: Manizales – Buga (223.3 km) ===
Place	Stage 8		General Classification	
Place	Name	Time	Name	Time
1.	Jhon García (COL)	05:08.23	Óscar Sevilla (ESP)	32:04.04
2.	William Aranzazu (COL)	—	Mauricio Ortega (COL)	+0.15
3.	John Parra (COL)	—	Fernando Camargo (COL)	+0.49

=== 2008-10-26: Palmira – Cali (35.7 km) ===
Place	Stage 9 (Individual Time Trial)		General Classification	
Place	Name	Time	Name	Time
1.	Juan Carlos López (COL)	00:44.56	Óscar Sevilla (ESP)	32:49.53
2.	Óscar Sevilla (ESP)	+0.13	Mauricio Ortega (COL)	+0.40
3.	Víctor Niño (COL)	+0.16	Juan Carlos López (COL)	+2.30

== Final classification ==
RANK	NAME	TEAM	TIME
1.	Óscar Sevilla (ESP)	Alcaldía de Tunja	32:49:53
2.	Mauricio Ortega (COL)	UNE-Orbitel	+ 0.40
3.	Juan Carlos López (COL)	UNE-Orbitel	+ 2.30
4.	Víctor Niño (COL)	EBSA Coordinadora	+ 3.02
5.	Luis Felipe Laverde (COL)	Indeportes Ag. Antioqueño Idea	+ 3.38
6.	Fernando Camargo (COL)	Lotería de Boyacá	+ 3.57
7.	Giovanny Báez (COL)	UNE−Orbitel	+ 4.22
8.	Janier Acevedo (COL)	Indeportes Ag. Antioqueño Idea	+ 5.44
9.	Darwin Atapuma (COL)	Indeportes Ag. Antioqueño Idea	+ 6.01
10.	Alex Cano (COL)	Indeportes Ag. Antioqueño Idea	+ 6.04

== See also ==
- 2008 Vuelta a Colombia
