= 2002 Clásico RCN =

Race details
- Dates: August 11 – August 18
- Stages: 8
- Distance: 1,041.1 km (646.9 mi)
- Winning time: 31h 22' 09"

Results
	Winner	José Castelblanco (COL)	(Colombia-Selle Italia)
	Second	Daniel Rincón (COL)	(05 Orbitel)
	Third	Fredy González (COL)	(Colombia-Selle Italia)
	Points	Gilberto Durango (COL)	(Papeles Scott)
	Mountains	Fredy González (COL)	(Colombia-Selle Italia)
	Youth	Alexis Castro (COL)	(Aguardiente Antioqueño)
	Combination	Fredy González (COL)	(Colombia-Selle Italia)
	Team	05 Orbitel	

The 42nd edition of the annual Clásico RCN was held from August 11 to August 18, 2002, in Colombia. The stage race with an UCI rate of 2.3 started in Cali and finished in Sopó. RCN stands for "Radio Cadena Nacional" – one of the oldest and largest radio networks in the nation.

== Stages ==
=== 2002-08-11: Cali — Armenia (190 km) ===
Place	Stage 1		General Classification	
Place	Name	Time	Name	Time
1.	Juan Botero (COL)	04:27.42	Juan Botero (COL)	04:27.32
2.	John Parra (COL)	+0.17	John Parra (COL)	+0.21
3.	César Laverde (COL)	+0.29	César Laverde (COL)	+0.35

=== 2002-08-12: Armenia — Manizales (153.8 km) ===
Place	Stage 2		General Classification	
Place	Name	Time	Name	Time
1.	Fredy González (COL)	04:06.03	Fredy González (COL)	08:35.05
2.	Julio César Aguirre (COL)	+0.10	Julio César Aguirre (COL)	+0.18
3.	Jairo Hernández (COL)	+0.19	Jairo Hernández (COL)	+0.29

=== 2002-08-13: Manizales — Sabaneta (190.6 km) ===
Place	Stage 3		General Classification	
Place	Name	Time	Name	Time
1.	Daniel Rincón (COL)	04:57.57	Daniel Rincón (COL)	13:33.35
2.	Fredy González (COL)	+1.18	Fredy González (COL)	+0.39
3.	Libardo Niño (COL)	—	Julio César Aguirre (COL)	+1.03

=== 2002-08-14: Medellín — Puerto Berrio (175 km) ===
Place	Stage 4		General Classification	
Place	Name	Time	Name	Time
1.	John Parra (COL)	04:20.39	Daniel Rincón (COL)	17:59.08
2.	Israel Ochoa (COL)	+4.32	Fredy González (COL)	+0.37
3.	Fidel Chacón (COL)	+4.34	Julio César Aguirre (COL)	+1.03

=== 2002-08-15: La Dorada — Ibagué (168 km) ===
Place	Stage 5		General Classification	
Place	Name	Time	Name	Time
1.	Fidel Chacón (COL)	05:06.16	Daniel Rincón (COL)	23:05.02
2.	Hernán Bonilla (COL)	+0.06	Fredy González (COL)	+0.26
3.	Fredy González (COL)	+0.31	Julio César Aguirre (COL)	+1.00

=== 2002-08-16: Ibagué — Mosquera (191.8 km) ===
Place	Stage 6		General Classification	
Place	Name	Time	Name	Time
1.	Fredy González (COL)	05:22.46	Fredy González (COL)	28:28.04
2.	José Castelblanco (COL)	+0.03	Daniel Rincón (COL)	—
3.	Urbelino Mesa (COL)	+0.11	Elder Herrera (COL)	+1.17

=== 2002-08-17: Circuito Parque Simón Bolívar, Bogotá (100 km) ===
Place	Stage 7		General Classification	
Place	Name	Time	Name	Time
1.	Elder Herrera (COL)	02:02.12	Fredy González (COL)	30:30.12
2.	Marlon Pérez (COL)	—	Daniel Rincón (COL)	+0.04
3.	Fredy González (COL)	—	Elder Herrera (COL)	+1.11

=== 2002-08-18: Sopo — Alto de Patios (33.8 km) ===
Place	Stage 8 (Individual Time Trial)		General Classification	
Place	Name	Time	Name	Time
1.	José Castelblanco (COL)	00:50.34	José Castelblanco (COL)	31:22.09
2.	Libardo Niño (COL)	+0.38	Daniel Rincón (COL)	+0.07
3.	Elder Herrera (COL)	+0.50	Fredy González (COL)	+0.33

== Final classification ==
RANK	NAME	TEAM	TIME
1.	José Castelblanco (COL)	Colombia-Selle Italia	31:22:09
2.	Daniel Rincón (COL)	05 Orbitel	+ 0.07
3.	Fredy González (COL)	Colombia-Selle Italia	+ 0.33
4.	Elder Herrera (COL)	05 Orbitel	+ 0.38
5.	Víctor Niño (COL)	Lotería de Boyacá	+ 1.43
6.	Libardo Niño (COL)	Lotería de Boyacá	+ 2.58
7.	Ismael Sarmiento (COL)	Lotería de Boyacá	+ 3.03
8.	Jairo Hernández (COL)	05 Orbitel	+ 3.50
9.	Alexis Rojas (COL)	Aguardiente Cristal	+ 3.53
10.	Urbelino Mesa (COL)	Lotería de Boyacá	+ 4.07

== See also ==
- 2002 Vuelta a Colombia
