= 2005 Vuelta a Colombia =

Race details
- Dates: July 24 – August 7, 2005
- Stages: 14
- Distance: 2,111.9 km (1,312 mi)
- Winning time: 54h 24' 55"

Results
Jersey awarded to the overall winner	Winner	Libardo Niño (COL)	(Loteria de Boyaca)
	Second	Walter Pedraza (COL)	(Orbitel)
	Third	Álvaro Sierra (COL)	(Orbitel)
	Points	Libardo Niño (COL)	(Loteria de Boyaca)
	Mountains	Álvaro Sierra (COL)	(Orbitel)
	Youth	Mauricio Soler (COL)	(Orbitel)
	Combination	Daniel Rincón (COL)	(Orbitel)
	Team	Orbitel	

The 55th edition of the Vuelta a Colombia was held from July 24 to August 7, 2005.

== Stages ==
=== 2005-07-24: Pitalito — Pitalito (5.7 km) ===
Place	Prologue		General Classification	
Place	Name	Time	Name	Time
1.	Alejandro Cortés (COL)	00:06.28	Alejandro Cortés (COL)	00:06.28
2.	Marlon Pérez (COL)	+0.02	Marlon Pérez (COL)	+0.02
3.	Israel Ochoa (COL)	+0.04	Israel Ochoa (COL)	+0.04

=== 2005-07-25: Pitalito — Yaguara (226.9 km) ===
Place	Stage 1		General Classification	
Place	Name	Time	Name	Time
1.	Manuel Medina (VEN)	05:42.50	Alejandro Cortés (COL)	05:29.28
2.	Edwin Orozco (COL)	—	Marlon Pérez (COL)	+0.02
3.	Heberth Gutiérrez (COL)	—	Heberth Gutiérrez (COL)	+0.02

=== 2005-07-26: Neiva — Agua de Dios (198 km) ===
Place	Stage 2		General Classification	
Place	Name	Time	Name	Time
1.	Nilton Ortíz (COL)	04:31.54	Carlos Ospina (COL)	10:22.02
2.	Carlos Ospina (COL)	+0.22	Alexander Roa (COL)	+0.41
3.	Alexander Roa (COL)	—	José Ibáñez (COL)	+3.11

=== 2005-07-27: Melgar — Armenia (180.4 km) ===
Place	Stage 3		General Classification	
Place	Name	Time	Name	Time
1.	Walter Pedraza (COL)	05:27.53	Walter Pedraza (COL)	15:53.42
2.	Álvaro Sierra (COL)	+0.01	Javier Zapata (COL)	+0.04
3.	Javier Zapata (COL)	+0.13	Heberth Gutiérrez (COL)	+0.05

=== 2005-07-28: Armenia — Cali (185.7 km) ===
Place	Stage 4		General Classification	
Place	Name	Time	Name	Time
1.	Javier Zapata (COL)	03:56.18	Javier Zapata (COL)	19:49.54
2.	Libardo Niño (COL)	+0.01	Walter Pedraza (COL)	+0.07
3.	Marlon Pérez (COL)	—	Heberth Gutiérrez (COL)	+0.12

=== 2005-07-29: Cali — Cerrito (41.2 km) ===
Place	Stage 5 (Individual Time Trial)		General Classification	
Place	Name	Time	Name	Time
1.	Libardo Niño (COL)	00:50.38	Heberth Gutiérrez (COL)	20:41.04
2.	Heberth Gutiérrez (COL)	+0.20	Javier Zapata (COL)	+0.35
3.	Marlon Pérez (COL)	+0.36	Walter Pedraza (COL)	+1.14

=== 2005-07-30: Palmira — Santa Rosa de Cabal (197.6 km) ===
Place	Stage 6		General Classification	
Place	Name	Time	Name	Time
1.	Vladimir González (COL)	04:59.51	Heberth Gutiérrez (COL)	25:45.58
2.	Edwin Orozco (COL)	+0.02	Javier Zapata (COL)	+0.01
3.	Moreno di Biase (ITA)	+1.19	Walter Pedraza (COL)	+0.40

=== 2005-07-31: Chinchina — Medellín (202.2 km) ===
Place	Stage 7		General Classification	
Place	Name	Time	Name	Time
1.	Graciano Fonseca (COL)	05:49.05	Javier Zapata (COL)	31:36.44
2.	Libardo Niño (COL)	+0.37	Heberth Gutiérrez (COL)	+0.11
3.	Mauricio Soler (COL)	+0.39	Libardo Niño (COL)	+0.41

=== 2005-08-01: Medellín — Jerico (113.1 km) ===
Place	Stage 8		General Classification	
Place	Name	Time	Name	Time
1.	Daniel Rincón (COL)	03:03.00	Javier Zapata (COL)	34:41.14
2.	Libardo Niño (COL)	+0.59	Libardo Niño (COL)	+0.04
3.	Álvaro Sierra (COL)	+1.02	Alexander Giraldo (COL)	+0.15

=== 2005-08-02: Jerico — Ciudad Bolívar (124.3 km) ===
Place	Stage 9		General Classification	
Place	Name	Time	Name	Time
1.	Jorge Humberto Martínez (COL)	02:41.03	Javier Zapata (COL)	37:32.02
2.	Marlon Pérez (COL)	+1.33	Libardo Niño (COL)	+0.04
3.	Wilson Zambrano (COL)	+1.50	Alexander Giraldo (COL)	+0.15

=== 2005-08-03: Ciudad Bolívar — Palestina (188.7 km) ===
Place	Stage 10		General Classification	
Place	Name	Time	Name	Time
1.	Fernando Camargo (COL)	04:44.38	Javier Zapata (COL)	42:25.01
2.	Edwin Orozco (COL)	+1.39	Alexander Giraldo (COL)	+0.06
3.	Elder Herrera (COL)	+1.44	Hernán Buenahora (COL)	+0.15

=== 2005-08-04: Chinchina — Mariquita (138.6 km) ===
Place	Stage 11		General Classification	
Place	Name	Time	Name	Time
1.	Urbelino Mesa (COL)	03:43.05	Hernán Buenahora (COL)	47:09.19
2.	Walter Pedraza (COL)	+0.58	Libardo Niño (COL)	+0.03
3.	Libardo Niño (COL)	—	Javier Zapata (COL)	+0.21

=== 2005-08-05: Dorada — Fontibón (175.6 km) ===
Place	Stage 12		General Classification	
Place	Name	Time	Name	Time
1.	Víctor Niño (COL)	05:10.33	Hernán Buenahora (COL)	51:22.02
2.	Mauricio Soler (COL)	—	Libardo Niño (COL)	+0.03
3.	Daniel Rincón (COL)	+0.01	Javier Zapata (COL)	+0.21

=== 2005-08-06: Bogotá — Bogotá (20.9 km) ===
Place	Stage 13 (Individual Time Trial)		General Classification	
Place	Name	Time	Name	Time
1.	Hernán Buenahora (COL)	00:33.18	Hernán Buenahora (COL)	51:55.20
2.	Libardo Niño (COL)	+0.03	Libardo Niño (COL)	+0.06
3.	Álvaro Sierra (COL)	+0.07	Walter Pedraza (COL)	+1.24

=== 2005-08-07: Bogotá Circuito (113 km) ===
Place	Stage 14		General Classification	
Place	Name	Time	Name	Time
1.	Mauricio Soler (COL)	02:27.48	Libardo Niño (COL)	54:24.55
2.	Javier Zapata (COL)	+1.37	Walter Pedraza (COL)	+1.14
3.	Marlon Pérez (COL)	—	Álvaro Sierra (COL)	+1.34

== Jersey progression ==
Stage	Winner	General classification	Points classification	Mountains classification	Youth classification
P	Alejandro Cortés	Alejandro Cortés	Jairo Pérez	Javier Zapata	Mauricio Soler
1	Manuel Medina	Alejandro Cortés	Manuel Medina	Fernando Camargo	Mauricio Soler
2	Nilton Ortíz	Carlos Ospina	Nilton Ortíz	Fernando Camargo	Carlos Ospina
3	Walter Pedraza	Walter Pedraza	Walter Pedraza	Álvaro Sierra	Rafael Ramírez
4	Javier Zapata	Javier Zapata	Heberth Gutiérrez	Álvaro Sierra	Rafael Ramírez
5	Libardo Niño	Heberth Gutiérrez	Heberth Gutiérrez	Álvaro Sierra	Mauricio Soler
6	Vladimir González	Heberth Gutiérrez	Javier Zapata	Álvaro Sierra	Mauricio Soler
7	Graciano Fonseca	Javier Zapata	Libardo Niño	Álvaro Sierra	Mauricio Soler
8	Daniel Rincón	Javier Zapata	Libardo Niño	Álvaro Sierra	Mauricio Soler
9	Jorge Humberto Martínez	Javier Zapata	Libardo Niño	Álvaro Sierra	Mauricio Soler
10	Fernando Camargo	Javier Zapata	Libardo Niño	Álvaro Sierra	Mauricio Soler
11	Urbelino Mesa	Hernán Buenahora	Libardo Niño	Álvaro Sierra	Mauricio Soler
12	Víctor Niño	Hernán Buenahora	Libardo Niño	Álvaro Sierra	Mauricio Soler
13	Hernán Buenahora	Hernán Buenahora	Libardo Niño	Álvaro Sierra	Mauricio Soler
14	Mauricio Soler	Libardo Niño	Libardo Niño	Álvaro Sierra	Mauricio Soler

== Final classification ==
RANK	NAME	TEAM	TIME
1.	Libardo Niño (COL)	Loteria de Boyaca	54:24:55
2.	Walter Pedraza (COL)	Orbitel	+ 1.14
3.	Álvaro Sierra (COL)	Orbitel	+ 1.34
4.	Javier Zapata (COL)	Orbitel	+ 1.44
5.	Alexis Castro (COL)	Aguardiente Antioqueño	+ 1.48
6.	Mauricio Soler (COL)	Orbitel	+ 3.24
7.	Daniel Rincón (COL)	Orbitel	+ 3.25
8.	Víctor Niño (COL)	Loteria de Boyaca	+ 17.40
9.	Urbelino Mesa (COL)	Mixed Team 2	+ 24.42
10.	Mauricio Neiza (COL)	Orbitel	+ 25.25
