= 2007 Clásico RCN =

Race details
- Dates: October 13 – October 21
- Stages: 8
- Distance: 1,138.9 km (707.7 mi)
- Winning time: 29h 56' 59"

Results
	Winner	Libardo Niño (COL)	(Coordinadora-Ebsa)
	Second	Javier González (COL)	(UNE-Orbitel)
	Third	Flober Peña (COL)	(Gobernación de Casanare)
	Points	Heberth Gutiérrez (COL)	(Indervalle-Frugos)
	Mountains	Flober Peña (COL)	(Gobernación de Casanare)
	Youth	Darwin Atapuma (COL)	(Aguardiente Antioqueño)
	Team	EPM Orbitel	

The 47th edition of the annual Clásico RCN was held from October 13 to October 21, 2007 in Colombia. The stage race with an UCI rating of 2.3 started with a prologue in Yopal and finished in Popayán.

== Stages ==
=== 2007-10-13: Yopal – Yopal (6.7 km) ===
Place	Prologue		General Classification	
Place	Name	Time	Name	Time
1.	Javier Zapata (COL)	00:08.09	Javier Zapata (COL)	00:08.09
2.	Libardo Niño (COL)	+0.12	Libardo Niño (COL)	+0.12
3.	Israel Ochoa (COL)	+0.15	Israel Ochoa (COL)	+0.15

=== 2007-10-14: Yopal – Villanueva (145.3 km) ===
Place	Stage 1		General Classification	
Place	Name	Time	Name	Time
1.	Heberth Gutiérrez (COL)	03:26.53	Javier Zapata (COL)	03:35.20
2.	Juan Esteban Arango (COL)	+0.04	Libardo Niño (COL)	+0.12
3.	Carlos Fonseca (COL)	—	Heberth Gutiérrez (COL)	+0.13

=== 2007-10-15: Villavicencio – Bogotá (120.2 km) ===
Place	Stage 2		General Classification	
Place	Name	Time	Name	Time
1.	Ismael Sarmiento (COL)	03:28.25	Ismael Sarmiento (COL)	07:03.58
2.	Libardo Niño (COL)	+1.52	Javier Zapata (COL)	+1.07
3.	Flober Peña (COL)	—	Víctor Niño (COL)	+1.13

=== 2007-10-16: Honda – Villamaría (130 km) ===
Place	Stage 3		General Classification	
Place	Name	Time	Name	Time
1.	Javier González (COL)	04:17.19	Libardo Niño (COL)	11:22.50
2.	Libardo Niño (COL)	+0.01	Javier González (COL)	+0.40
3.	Hernán Buenahora (COL)	+0.49	Hernán Buenahora (COL)	+1.10

=== 2007-10-17: Manizales – Envigado (189.3 km) ===
Place	Stage 4		General Classification	
Place	Name	Time	Name	Time
1.	Urbelino Mesa (COL)	04:55.46	Libardo Niño (COL)	16:23.11
2.	Jairo Pérez (COL)	+0.16	Javier González (COL)	+0.40
3.	Elder Herrera (COL)	+0.36	Flober Peña (COL)	+3.10

=== 2007-10-18: Caldas – Pereira (180.3 km) ===
Place	Stage 5		General Classification	
Place	Name	Time	Name	Time
1.	José Castelblanco (COL)	04:56.47	Libardo Niño (COL)	21:21.01
2.	Elder Herrera (COL)	+1.03	Javier González (COL)	+0.55
3.	Carlos Ospina (COL)	—	Flober Peña (COL)	+3.10

=== 2007-10-19: Pereira – Cali (214.4 km) ===
Place	Stage 6		General Classification	
Place	Name	Time	Name	Time
1.	Jhon García (COL)	04:51.36	Libardo Niño (COL)	26:12.37
2.	Fredy González (COL)	—	Javier González (COL)	+0.55
3.	Javier Zapata (COL)	—	Flober Peña (COL)	+3.10

=== 2007-10-20: Cali – Popayán (123.8 km) ===
Place	Stage 7		General Classification	
Place	Name	Time	Name	Time
1.	Israel Ochoa (COL)	03:05.06	Libardo Niño (COL)	29:20.19
2.	Ricardo Mesa (COL)	+2.35	Javier González (COL)	+0.55
3.	Flober Peña (COL)	—	Flober Peña (COL)	+3.06

=== 2007-10-21: Circuito Urbano en Popayán (28.9 km) ===
Place	Stage 8 (Individual Time Trial)		General Classification	
Place	Name	Time	Name	Time
1.	Israel Ochoa (COL)	00:36.37	Libardo Niño (COL)	29:56.59
2.	Elder Herrera (COL)	+0.01	Javier González (COL)	+2.21
3.	Libardo Niño (COL)	+0.03	Flober Peña (COL)	+4.58

== Final classification ==
RANK	NAME	TEAM	TIME
1.	Libardo Niño (COL)	Coordinadora-Ebsa	29:56:59
2.	Javier González (COL)	UNE-Orbitel	+ 2.21
3.	Flober Peña (COL)	Gobernación de Casanare	+ 4.58
4.	Hernán Buenahora (COL)	Lotería de Boyacá	+ 5.00
5.	Elder Herrera (COL)	Indervalle-Frugos	+ 5.36
6.	José Castelblanco (COL)	Lotería de Boyacá	+ 9.38
7.	Javier Zapata (COL)	Orgullo Santuariano	+ 10.24
8.	Freddy Piamonte (COL)	UNE−Orbitel	+ 12.55
9.	Manuel Mayorga (COL)	Colombia es Pasión	+ 18.23
10.	Urbelino Mesa (COL)	Lotería de Boyacá	+ 23.23

== See also ==
- 2007 Vuelta a Colombia
