= Alejandro Cortés =

Alejandro Cortés may refer to:

- Alejandro Cortés (cyclist)
- Alejandro Cortes (tennis)
