= Heberth Gutiérrez =

Colombian cyclist

Heberth Gutiérrez García (born February 13, 1973, in Roldanillo, Valle del Cauca) is a male professional road cyclist from Colombia.

== Career ==
1996
1st in Stage 3 Vuelta a Colombia, Bucaramanga (COL)
2001
1st in Stage 3 Clásico RCN, Anserma (COL)
2003
1st in Colombia National Championship, Road, ITT, Elite, Colombia, Villavicencio (COL)
1st in Stage 3 Vuelta al Tolima, El Fresno (COL)
1st in General Classification Vuelta al Tolima (COL)
1st in Stage 1 Volta do Rio de Janeiro, Angra dos Reis (BRA)
1st in Stage 2 Volta do Rio de Janeiro, Nova Friburgo (BRA)
1st in General Classification Volta do Rio de Janeiro (BRA)
3rd in Colombia National Championship, Road, Elite, Colombia, Villavicencio (COL)
1st in Stage 2 GP Mundo Ciclistico, Funza (COL)
1st in General Classification GP Mundo Ciclistico (COL)
3rd in General Classification Clasica Integración de la Guadua-Gobernación de Risaralda (COL)
1st in Stage 12 Vuelta a Colombia, La Union (COL)
2004
1st in Stage 4 Vuelta a Uraba, Apartadó. (COL)
1st in General Classification Vuelta a Uraba (COL)
1st in Stage 5 Vuelta a Boyacà, Tunja (COL)
1st in Stage 12 Vuelta a Colombia, Funza (COL)
1st in Stage 3 Clásica Ciudad de Girardot, Girardot (COL)
3rd in General Classification Clásica Ciudad de Girardot (COL)
2005
2nd in Colombia National Championship, Road, Elite, Colombia (COL)
1st in Stage 1 Vuelta al Tolima, Icononzo (COL)
1st in Stage 5 Clásica Nacional Marco Fidel Suárez, Bello circuit (COL)
2006
3rd in General Classification Clásica de Fusagasugá (COL)
1st in Stage 10 Vuelta a Colombia, Buga (COL) +

alongside Alejandro Cortés, Fabio Duarte, Jhon García, Javier Alberto González, Edwin Parra, Juan Diego Ramírez, Daniel Rincón, and Javier Zapata

2007
1st in Stage 1 Clásico RCN, Villanueva (COL)
1st in Points Classification Clásico RCN (COL)
