= Daniel Rincón =

Daniel Rincón may refer to:

- Daniel Rincón (cyclist) (born 1975), Colombian champion road cyclist
- Daniel Rincón (tennis) (born 2003), Spanish winner of 2021 US Open boys' singles
