= Alejandro Cortés (cyclist) =

Colombian cyclist

Alejandro Iván Cortés Llano (born December 2, 1977) is a male professional road racing cyclist from Colombia.

== Career ==
2001
3rd in Colombia National Championships, Road, Elite, Colombia (COL)
1st in Stage 1 Clásico RCN, Jerico (COL)
2002
1st in Stage 1 Vuelta al Tolima, Ibagué (COL)
2nd in General Classification Vuelta al Tolima (COL)
2003
1st in Stage 8 Vuelta a Colombia, Duitama (COL)
2004
3rd in General Classification Vuelta a Uraba (COL)
3rd in General Classification Clasica Alcaldía de Pasca (COL)
1st in Stage 4 part b Vuelta de la Paz, San Vicente (COL)
2005
1st in Prologue Vuelta a Colombia, Pitalito (COL)
2006
1st in Colombia National Championships, Road, Elite, Colombia, Popayán (COL)
1st in Stage 1 Clásica Nacional Marco Fidel Suárez, Puerto Berrio (COL)
1st in Stage 2 Vuelta a Colombia, San Cristóbal (COL)
1st in Stage 10 Vuelta a Colombia, Buga (COL)

alongside Fabio Duarte, Jhon García, Javier Alberto González, Heberth Gutiérrez, Edwin Parra, Juan Diego Ramírez, Daniel Rincón, and Javier Zapata

2009
1st in Stage 2 Vuelta a Colombia, Ibagué (COL)
