= Walter Pedraza =

Colombian racing cyclist

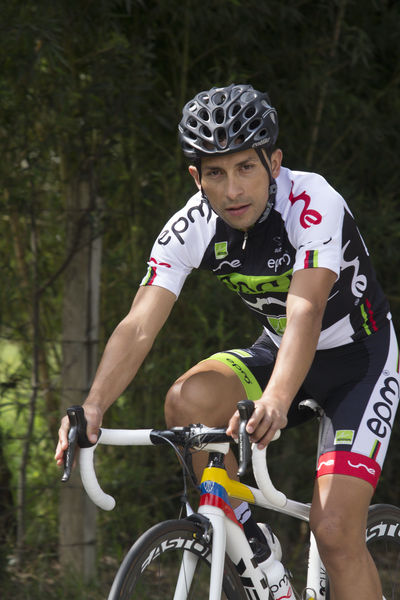

Personal information
- Full name: Walter Fernando Pedraza Morales
- Born: November 27, 1981 (age 44) Soacha, Colombia
- Height: 1.67 m (5 ft 6 in)
- Weight: 58 kg (128 lb)

Cycling career
- Sport: Cycling
- Current team: Team Cartagena
- Discipline: Road
- Role: Rider
- Rider type: Climbing specialist

Amateur teams
- 2004–2005: 05 Orbitel
- 2014: EPM–UNE–Área Metropolitana
- 2021–: Team Cartagena

Professional teams
- 2006–2007: Selle Italia–Diquigiovanni
- 2008: Tinkoff Credit Systems
- 2009–2010: SP Tableware–Gatsoulis Bikes
- 2011–2013: EPM–UNE
- 2015: Colombia
- 2016–2019: GW–Shimano
- 2020: Equipo Continental Supergiros

Major wins
- National Road Race Championships (2005, 2013)

Walter Fernando Pedraza Morales (born November 27, 1981, in Soacha) is a Colombian professional road racing cyclist, who currently rides for Colombian amateur team Team Cartagena. Pedraza is a two-time winner of the Colombian National Road Race Championships in 2005 and 2013.

== Major results ==
2004
8th Overall Clásico RCN
2005
1st Road race, National Road Championships
2nd Overall Vuelta a Colombia

1st Stage 3

2006
1st Stage 7 Vuelta a Colombia
5th Overall Tour de Langkawi
6th Overall Vuelta al Táchira
7th Overall Vuelta Ciclista de Chile
2007
1st Stage 10 Vuelta al Táchira
3rd Overall Tour de Langkawi
4th Overall Vuelta Ciclista de Chile

1st Stage 9

2008
3rd Road race, National Road Championships
3rd Overall Vuelta a Burgos
8th Overall Tour of Austria
2009
3rd Overall Tour of Bulgaria
2010
2nd Overall Tour of Szeklerland
4th Overall Tour of Małopolska
4th Overall Tour des Pyrénées
6th Overall Tour of Romania
9th Grand Prix de la ville de Nogent-sur-Oise
2011
7th Overall Vuelta a Colombia

1st Stage 1

2012
1st Mountains classification Vuelta a Castilla y León
1st Mountains classification Vuelta a Asturias
2013
1st Road race, National Road Championships
8th Road race, Pan American Road Championships
2014
Vuelta a Colombia

1st Mountains classification
1st Stage 1 (TTT)

5th Overall Vuelta a Guatemala

1st Mountains classification

6th Overall Tour do Brasil

1st Stage 7

2017
5th Overall Vuelta Ciclista a Costa Rica
2018
5th Road race, National Road Championships

=== Grand Tour general classification results timeline ===
Grand Tour	2008	2009	2010	2011	2012	2013	2014	2015
Giro d'Italia	Has not contested during his career							
Tour de France	Has not contested during his career							
Vuelta a España	85	—	—	—	—	—	—	136

Legend
—	Did not compete
DNF	Did not finish
