= Encino, Santander =

- Municipality and town
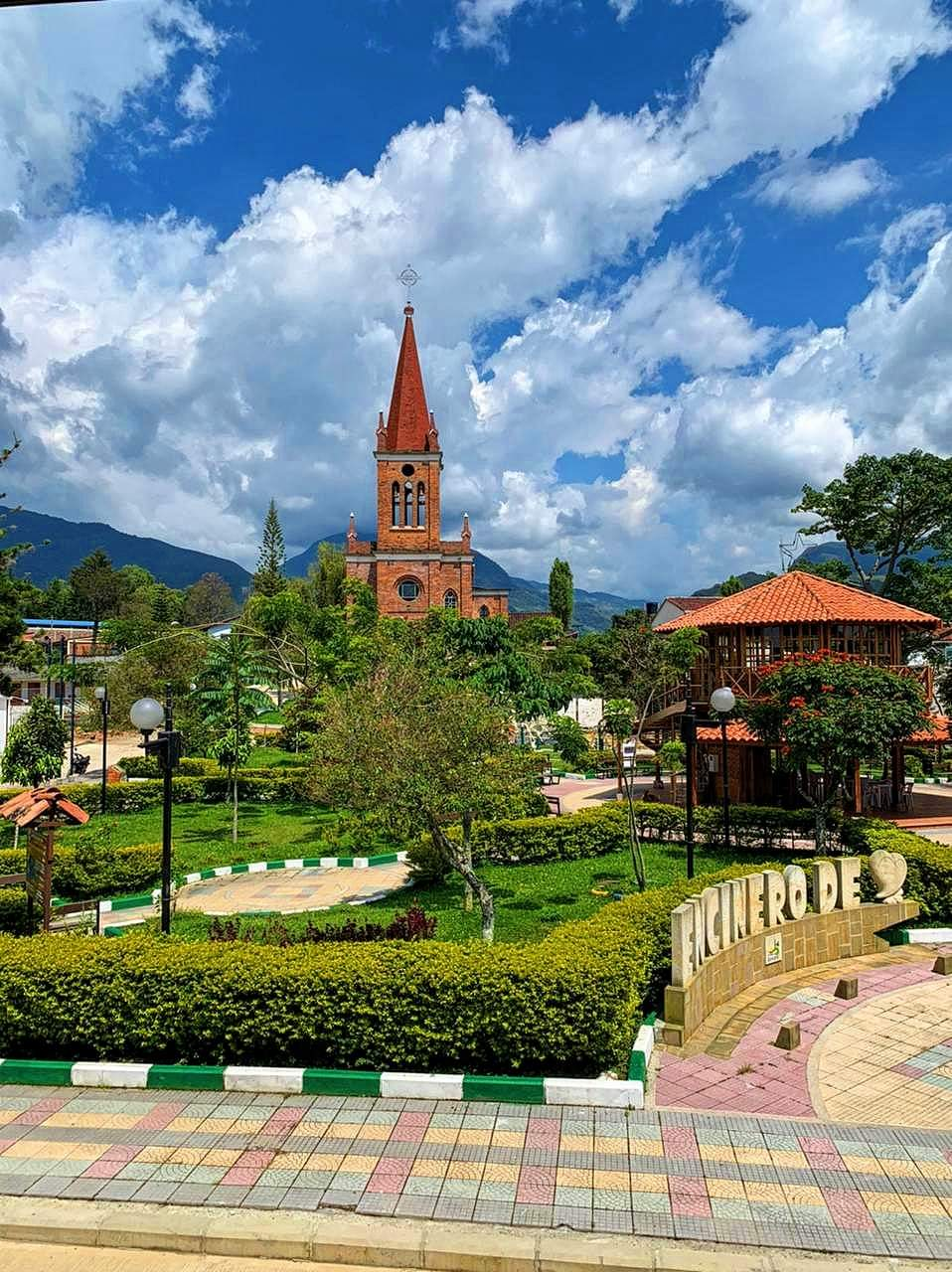

- Flag

- Location of the municipality and town of Encino, Santander in the Santander Department of Colombia

- Location in Colombia
- Coordinates: 6°08′16″N 73°05′56″W
- Country: Colombia
- Department: Santander Department
- Elevation: 1,854 m (6,083 ft)

Population
  - Total: 2,711
- Time zone: UTC-5 (Colombia Standard Time)

Encino is a town and municipality in the Santander Department in northeastern Colombia.

== Climate ==
Encino has a subtropical highland climate (Köppen Cfb) with cool to pleasant mornings, warm to very warm afternoons, and very heavy rainfall year round.

Climate data for Encino
Month	Jan	Feb	Mar	Apr	May	Jun	Jul	Aug	Sep	Oct	Nov	Dec	Year
Mean daily maximum °C (°F)	24.2 (75.6)	24.6 (76.3)	24.6 (76.3)	23.7 (74.7)	23.2 (73.8)	23.0 (73.4)	23.3 (73.9)	23.3 (73.9)	23.2 (73.8)	22.7 (72.9)	23.0 (73.4)	23.4 (74.1)	23.5 (74.3)
Daily mean °C (°F)	17.7 (63.9)	18.1 (64.6)	18.4 (65.1)	18.2 (64.8)	18.0 (64.4)	17.7 (63.9)	17.4 (63.3)	17.4 (63.3)	17.5 (63.5)	17.6 (63.7)	17.7 (63.9)	17.5 (63.5)	17.8 (64.0)
Mean daily minimum °C (°F)	11.3 (52.3)	11.7 (53.1)	12.2 (54.0)	12.8 (55.0)	12.8 (55.0)	12.4 (54.3)	11.5 (52.7)	11.6 (52.9)	11.9 (53.4)	12.5 (54.5)	12.5 (54.5)	11.7 (53.1)	12.1 (53.7)
Average rainfall mm (inches)	211.1 (8.31)	264.4 (10.41)	351.0 (13.82)	381.6 (15.02)	296.1 (11.66)	141.5 (5.57)	116.9 (4.60)	134.2 (5.28)	234.4 (9.23)	375.6 (14.79)	422.1 (16.62)	270.7 (10.66)	3,199.6 (125.97)
Average rainy days	14	15	19	22	19	14	13	14	17	22	22	17	208
Source 1: Instituto de Hidrologia Meteorologia y Estudios Ambientales
Source 2:

== Born in Encino ==
- Félix Cárdenas, professional cyclist
