= 2011 Tour de Suisse =

2011 UCI World Tour, race 16 of 27
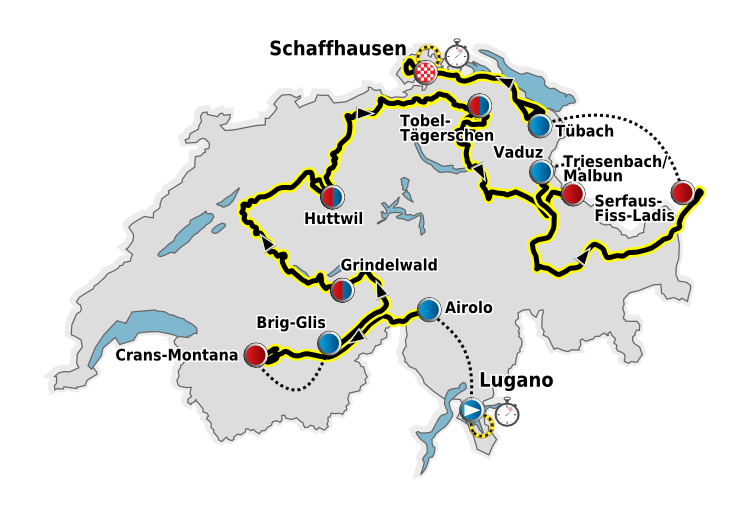
- The route of the 2011 Tour de Suisse

Race details
- Dates: 11–19 June 2011
- Stages: 9
- Distance: 1,246.4 km (774.5 mi)
- Winning time: 31h 45' 02"

Results
Jersey awarded to the overall winner	Winner	Levi Leipheimer (USA)	(Team RadioShack)
	Second	Damiano Cunego (ITA)	(Lampre–ISD)
	Third	Steven Kruijswijk (NED)	(Rabobank)
Jersey awarded to the points classification winner	Points	Peter Sagan (SVK)	(Liquigas–Cannondale)
Jersey awarded to the mountains classification winner	Mountains	Andy Schleck (LUX)	(Leopard Trek)
Jersey awarded to the sprints classification winner	Sprints	Lloyd Mondory (FRA)	(Ag2r–La Mondiale)
	Team	Leopard Trek	

The 2011 Tour de Suisse was the 75th running of the Tour de Suisse cycling stage race. It started on 11 June with an individual time trial in Lugano and ended with another individual time trial on 19 June, in Schaffhausen. It was the 16th race of the 2011 UCI World Tour season.

Just like the previous edition of the race won by Fränk Schleck, the lead of the race changed hands in the final time trial stage. Lampre–ISD rider Damiano Cunego, who had held the lead of the race since stage three, had an advantage of over 90 seconds to his nearest challenger Steven Kruijswijk of Rabobank, but it was Team RadioShack's Levi Leipheimer, who had been fourth prior to the final stage and almost two minutes in arrears of Cunego, that took the final overall honours. Leipheimer, who was only third on the stage behind Fabian Cancellara (Leopard Trek) and team-mate Andreas Klöden, triumphed by four seconds over Cunego after 1,246.4 kilometres (774.5 miles) of racing. Kruijswijk managed to hold on to third place in the overall classification, 62 seconds down on Leipheimer, but eight seconds ahead of another Leopard Trek rider, Jakob Fuglsang.

In the race's other classifications, Leopard Trek rider Andy Schleck won the King of the Mountains classification, Liquigas–Cannondale's Peter Sagan won the points classification after placing five times in the top three of stage results, Lloyd Mondory of Ag2r–La Mondiale finished clear at the top of the sprints classification, with Leopard Trek also finishing at the head of the teams classification.

== Route ==
Stage characteristics and winners
Stage	Date	Course	Distance	Type	Winner
1	11 June	Lugano	7.3 km (4.5 mi)	Individual time trial	Fabian Cancellara (SUI)
2	12 June	Airolo to Crans-Montana	149 km (92.6 mi)		Mauricio Soler (COL)
3	13 June	Brig-Glis to Grindelwald	107.6 km (66.9 mi)		Peter Sagan (SVK)
4	14 June	Grindelwald to Huttwil	198.4 km (123.3 mi)		Thor Hushovd (NOR)
5	15 June	Huttwil to Tobel-Tägerschen	204.2 km (126.9 mi)		Borut Božič (SLO)
6	16 June	Tobel-Tägerschen to Triesenberg (Liechtenstein)	157.7 km (98.0 mi)		Steven Kruijswijk (NED)
7	17 June	Vaduz (Liechtenstein) to Serfaus–Fiss–Ladis (Austria)	222.8 km (138.4 mi)		Thomas De Gendt (BEL)
8	18 June	Tübach to Schaffhausen	167.3 km (104.0 mi)		Peter Sagan (SVK)
9	19 June	Schaffhausen	32.1 km (19.9 mi)	Individual time trial	Fabian Cancellara (SUI)

== Stages ==
=== Stage 1 ===
11 June 2011 – Lugano, 7.3 km (4.5 mi) individual time trial (ITT)

Stage 1 Result and General classification after Stage 1

	Rider	Team	Time
1	Fabian Cancellara (SUI)	Leopard Trek	9' 41"
2	Tejay van Garderen (USA)	HTC–Highroad	+ 9"
3	Peter Sagan (SVK)	Liquigas–Cannondale	+ 17"
4	Gustav Larsson (SWE)	Saxo Bank–SunGard	+ 17"
5	Andreas Klöden (GER)	Team RadioShack	+ 18"
6	Tom Danielson (USA)	Garmin–Cervélo	+ 20"
7	Peter Velits (SVK)	HTC–Highroad	+ 21"
8	Bauke Mollema (NED)	Rabobank	+ 22"
9	Levi Leipheimer (USA)	Team RadioShack	+ 22"
10	Linus Gerdemann (GER)	Leopard Trek	+ 22"

=== Stage 2 ===
12 June 2011 – Airolo to Crans-Montana, 149 km (92.6 mi)

Stage 2 Result

	Cyclist	Team	Time
1	Mauricio Soler (COL)	Movistar Team	4h 23' 20"
2	Damiano Cunego (ITA)	Lampre–ISD	+ 12"
3	Fränk Schleck (LUX)	Leopard Trek	+ 12"
4	Danilo Di Luca (ITA)	Team Katusha	+ 16"
5	Bauke Mollema (NED)	Rabobank	+ 18"
6	Levi Leipheimer (USA)	Team RadioShack	+ 34"
7	Tejay van Garderen (USA)	HTC–Highroad	+ 36"
8	Mathias Frank (SUI)	BMC Racing Team	+ 39"
9	Eros Capecchi (ITA)	Liquigas–Cannondale	+ 47"
10	Laurens ten Dam (NED)	Rabobank	+ 47"

General classification after Stage 2

	Rider	Team	Time
1	Mauricio Soler (COL)	Movistar Team	4h 33' 19"
2	Damiano Cunego (ITA)	Lampre–ISD	+ 16"
3	Bauke Mollema (NED)	Rabobank	+ 22"
4	Tejay van Garderen (USA)	HTC–Highroad	+ 27"
5	Fränk Schleck (LUX)	Leopard Trek	+ 31"
6	Levi Leipheimer (USA)	Team RadioShack	+ 38"
7	Danilo Di Luca (ITA)	Team Katusha	+ 39"
8	Mathias Frank (SUI)	BMC Racing Team	+ 52"
9	Chris Froome (GBR)	Team Sky	+ 1' 02"
10	Eros Capecchi (ITA)	Liquigas–Cannondale	+ 1' 05"

=== Stage 3 ===
13 June 2011 – Brig-Glis to Grindelwald, 107.6 km (66.9 mi)

Stage 3 Result

	Cyclist	Team	Time
1	Peter Sagan (SVK)	Liquigas–Cannondale	3h 09' 47"
2	Damiano Cunego (ITA)	Lampre–ISD	s.t.
3	Jakob Fuglsang (DEN)	Leopard Trek	+ 21"
4	Laurens ten Dam (NED)	Rabobank	+ 21"
5	Giampaolo Caruso (ITA)	Team Katusha	+ 48"
6	Tejay van Garderen (USA)	HTC–Highroad	+ 1' 04"
7	Fränk Schleck (LUX)	Leopard Trek	+ 1' 04"
8	Bauke Mollema (NED)	Rabobank	+ 1' 04"
9	Mauricio Soler (COL)	Movistar Team	+ 1' 04"
10	Francis De Greef (BEL)	Omega Pharma–Lotto	+ 1' 04"

General classification after Stage 3

	Rider	Team	Time
1	Damiano Cunego (ITA)	Lampre–ISD	7h 43' 16"
2	Mauricio Soler (COL)	Movistar Team	+ 54"
3	Bauke Mollema (NED)	Rabobank	+ 1' 16"
4	Laurens ten Dam (NED)	Rabobank	+ 1' 19"
5	Tejay van Garderen (USA)	HTC–Highroad	+ 1' 21"
6	Fränk Schleck (LUX)	Leopard Trek	+ 1' 25"
7	Jakob Fuglsang (DEN)	Leopard Trek	+ 1' 32"
8	Danilo Di Luca (ITA)	Team Katusha	+ 1' 53"
9	Steven Kruijswijk (NED)	Rabobank	+ 2' 00"
10	Levi Leipheimer (USA)	Team RadioShack	+ 2' 10"

=== Stage 4 ===
14 June 2011 – Grindelwald to Huttwil, 198.4 km (123.3 mi)

Stage 4 Result

	Cyclist	Team	Time
1	Thor Hushovd (NOR)	Garmin–Cervélo	4h 46' 05"
2	Peter Sagan (SVK)	Liquigas–Cannondale	s.t.
3	Marco Marcato (ITA)	Vacansoleil–DCM	+ 2"
4	José Joaquín Rojas (ESP)	Movistar Team	+ 2"
5	Óscar Freire (ESP)	Rabobank	+ 2"
6	Enrico Gasparotto (ITA)	Astana	+ 2"
7	Greg Van Avermaet (BEL)	BMC Racing Team	+ 2"
8	Zdeněk Štybar (CZE)	Quick-Step	+ 2"
9	Tom Boonen (BEL)	Quick-Step	+ 2"
10	Daryl Impey (RSA)	Team NetApp	+ 2"

General classification after Stage 4

	Rider	Team	Time
1	Damiano Cunego (ITA)	Lampre–ISD	12h 29' 23"
2	Mauricio Soler (COL)	Movistar Team	+ 54"
3	Bauke Mollema (NED)	Rabobank	+ 1' 16"
4	Laurens ten Dam (NED)	Rabobank	+ 1' 19"
5	Tejay van Garderen (USA)	HTC–Highroad	+ 1' 21"
6	Fränk Schleck (LUX)	Leopard Trek	+ 1' 25"
7	Jakob Fuglsang (DEN)	Leopard Trek	+ 1' 32"
8	Danilo Di Luca (ITA)	Team Katusha	+ 1' 53"
9	Steven Kruijswijk (NED)	Rabobank	+ 2' 00"
10	Levi Leipheimer (USA)	Team RadioShack	+ 2' 10"

=== Stage 5 ===
15 June 2011 – Huttwil to Tobel-Tägerschen, 204.2 km (126.9 mi)

Stage 5 Result

	Cyclist	Team	Time
1	Borut Božič (SLO)	Vacansoleil–DCM	4h 44' 48"
2	Óscar Freire (ESP)	Rabobank	s.t.
3	Peter Sagan (SVK)	Liquigas–Cannondale	s.t.
4	Tejay van Garderen (USA)	HTC–Highroad	s.t.
5	José Joaquín Rojas (ESP)	Movistar Team	s.t.
6	Marco Marcato (ITA)	Vacansoleil–DCM	s.t.
7	Anthony Ravard (FRA)	Ag2r–La Mondiale	s.t.
8	Linus Gerdemann (GER)	Leopard Trek	s.t.
9	Greg Van Avermaet (BEL)	BMC Racing Team	s.t.
10	Ben Swift (GBR)	Team Sky	s.t.

General classification after Stage 5

	Rider	Team	Time
1	Damiano Cunego (ITA)	Lampre–ISD	17h 14' 11"
2	Mauricio Soler (COL)	Movistar Team	+ 54"
3	Bauke Mollema (NED)	Rabobank	+ 1' 16"
4	Laurens ten Dam (NED)	Rabobank	+ 1' 19"
5	Tejay van Garderen (USA)	HTC–Highroad	+ 1' 21"
6	Fränk Schleck (LUX)	Leopard Trek	+ 1' 25"
7	Jakob Fuglsang (DEN)	Leopard Trek	+ 1' 32"
8	Danilo Di Luca (ITA)	Team Katusha	+ 1' 53"
9	Steven Kruijswijk (NED)	Rabobank	+ 2' 00"
10	Levi Leipheimer (USA)	Team RadioShack	+ 2' 10"

=== Stage 6 ===
16 June 2011 – Tobel-Tägerschen to Triesenberg (Liechtenstein), 157.7 km (98.0 mi)

Stage 6 Result

	Cyclist	Team	Time
1	Steven Kruijswijk (NED)	Rabobank	4h 12' 03"
2	Levi Leipheimer (USA)	Team RadioShack	+ 9"
3	Damiano Cunego (ITA)	Lampre–ISD	+ 18"
4	Bauke Mollema (NED)	Rabobank	+ 21"
5	Giampaolo Caruso (ITA)	Team Katusha	+ 21"
6	Fränk Schleck (LUX)	Leopard Trek	+ 30"
7	Mathias Frank (SUI)	BMC Racing Team	+ 30"
8	Laurens ten Dam (NED)	Rabobank	+ 1' 19"
9	Jakob Fuglsang (DEN)	Leopard Trek	+ 1' 27"
10	Tom Danielson (USA)	Garmin–Cervélo	+ 1' 42"

General classification after Stage 6

	Rider	Team	Time
1	Damiano Cunego (ITA)	Lampre–ISD	21h 26' 28"
2	Bauke Mollema (NED)	Rabobank	+ 1' 23"
3	Steven Kruijswijk (NED)	Rabobank	+ 1' 36"
4	Fränk Schleck (LUX)	Leopard Trek	+ 1' 41"
5	Levi Leipheimer (USA)	Team RadioShack	+ 1' 59"
6	Laurens ten Dam (NED)	Rabobank	+ 2' 24"
7	Jakob Fuglsang (DEN)	Leopard Trek	+ 2' 45"
8	Mathias Frank (SUI)	BMC Racing Team	+ 3' 10"
9	Giampaolo Caruso (ITA)	Team Katusha	+ 3' 11"
10	Tejay van Garderen (USA)	HTC–Highroad	+ 3' 22"

=== Stage 7 ===
17 June 2011 – Vaduz (Liechtenstein) to Serfaus–Fiss–Ladis (Austria), 222.8 km (138.4 mi)

Stage 7 Result

	Cyclist	Team	Time
1	Thomas De Gendt (BEL)	Vacansoleil–DCM	5h 38' 42"
2	Andy Schleck (LUX)	Leopard Trek	+ 35"
3	José Joaquín Rojas (ESP)	Movistar Team	+ 48"
4	Christian Vande Velde (USA)	Garmin–Cervélo	+ 51"
5	Alberto Losada (ESP)	Team Katusha	+ 54"
6	Sergey Lagutin (UZB)	Vacansoleil–DCM	+ 1' 33"
7	Jan Bakelants (BEL)	Omega Pharma–Lotto	+ 1' 34"
8	Marco Marcato (ITA)	Vacansoleil–DCM	+ 2' 30"
9	George Hincapie (USA)	BMC Racing Team	+ 2' 30"
10	Manuele Boaro (ITA)	Saxo Bank–SunGard	+ 2' 30"

General classification after Stage 7

	Rider	Team	Time
1	Damiano Cunego (ITA)	Lampre–ISD	27h 09' 49"
2	Bauke Mollema (NED)	Rabobank	+ 1' 23"
3	Steven Kruijswijk (NED)	Rabobank	+ 1' 36"
4	Fränk Schleck (LUX)	Leopard Trek	+ 1' 41"
5	Levi Leipheimer (USA)	Team RadioShack	+ 1' 59"
6	Jakob Fuglsang (DEN)	Leopard Trek	+ 2' 38"
7	Mathias Frank (SUI)	BMC Racing Team	+ 3' 10"
8	Laurens ten Dam (NED)	Rabobank	+ 3' 10"
9	Giampaolo Caruso (ITA)	Team Katusha	+ 3' 11"
10	Tejay van Garderen (USA)	HTC–Highroad	+ 3' 22"

=== Stage 8 ===
18 June 2011 – Tübach to Schaffhausen, 167.3 km (104.0 mi)

Rabobank's Bauke Mollema, who was placed second overall at the time, punctured about 15 km from the finish. When the Leopard Trek team heard it, they led the chase, and Mollema was unable to get back to the group, and he finished 48 seconds behind. Rabobank assistant directeur sportif Frans Maassen said that Mollema should have had a chance to win the stage.

Stage 8 Result

	Cyclist	Team	Time
1	Peter Sagan (SVK)	Liquigas–Cannondale	3h 52' 00"
2	Matthew Goss (AUS)	HTC–Highroad	s.t.
3	Ben Swift (GBR)	Team Sky	s.t.
4	Koldo Fernández (ESP)	Euskaltel–Euskadi	s.t.
5	Thor Hushovd (NOR)	Garmin–Cervélo	s.t.
6	José Joaquín Rojas (ESP)	Movistar Team	s.t.
7	Gerald Ciolek (GER)	Quick-Step	s.t.
8	Ian Stannard (GBR)	Team Sky	s.t.
9	Simon Clarke (AUS)	Astana	s.t.
10	Tejay van Garderen (USA)	HTC–Highroad	s.t.

General classification after Stage 8

	Rider	Team	Time
1	Damiano Cunego (ITA)	Lampre–ISD	31h 01' 49"
2	Steven Kruijswijk (NED)	Rabobank	+ 1' 36"
3	Fränk Schleck (LUX)	Leopard Trek	+ 1' 41"
4	Levi Leipheimer (USA)	Team RadioShack	+ 1' 59"
5	Bauke Mollema (NED)	Rabobank	+ 2' 11"
6	Jakob Fuglsang (DEN)	Leopard Trek	+ 2' 38"
7	Laurens ten Dam (NED)	Rabobank	+ 3' 10"
8	Giampaolo Caruso (ITA)	Team Katusha	+ 3' 11"
9	Mathias Frank (SUI)	BMC Racing Team	+ 3' 20"
10	Tejay van Garderen (USA)	HTC–Highroad	+ 3' 22"

=== Stage 9 ===
19 June 2011 – Schaffhausen, 32.1 km (19.9 mi) individual time trial (ITT)

Stage 9 Result

	Cyclist	Team	Time
1	Fabian Cancellara (SUI)	Leopard Trek	41' 01"
2	Andreas Klöden (GER)	Team RadioShack	+ 9"
3	Levi Leipheimer (USA)	Team RadioShack	+ 13"
4	Nelson Oliveira (POR)	Team RadioShack	+ 25"
5	Tom Danielson (USA)	Garmin–Cervélo	+ 38"
6	Gustav Larsson (SWE)	Saxo Bank–SunGard	+ 41"
7	Jakob Fuglsang (DEN)	Leopard Trek	+ 44"
8	Thomas De Gendt (BEL)	Vacansoleil–DCM	+ 48"
9	Chris Froome (GBR)	Team Sky	+ 1' 02"
10	Christian Vande Velde (USA)	Garmin–Cervélo	+ 1' 04"

Final General classification

	Rider	Team	Time
1	Levi Leipheimer (USA)	Team RadioShack	31h 45' 02"
2	Damiano Cunego (ITA)	Lampre–ISD	+ 4"
3	Steven Kruijswijk (NED)	Rabobank	+ 1' 02"
4	Jakob Fuglsang (DEN)	Leopard Trek	+ 1' 10"
5	Bauke Mollema (NED)	Rabobank	+ 2' 05"
6	Mathias Frank (SUI)	BMC Racing Team	+ 2' 24"
7	Fränk Schleck (LUX)	Leopard Trek	+ 2' 35"
8	Laurens ten Dam (NED)	Rabobank	+ 3' 11"
9	Tom Danielson (USA)	Garmin–Cervélo	+ 3' 17"
10	Maxime Monfort (BEL)	Leopard Trek	+ 4' 12"

== Leadership classification ==
Stage	Winner	General classification	Mountains Classification	Points classification	Sprints Classification	Team Classification
1	Fabian Cancellara	Fabian Cancellara	no award	Fabian Cancellara	no award	Leopard Trek
2	Mauricio Soler	Mauricio Soler	Matti Breschel	Tejay van Garderen	Lloyd Mondory	Rabobank
3	Peter Sagan	Damiano Cunego	Laurens ten Dam	Peter Sagan	Lloyd Mondory	Rabobank
4	Thor Hushovd	Damiano Cunego	Laurens ten Dam	Peter Sagan	Lloyd Mondory	Rabobank
5	Borut Božič	Damiano Cunego	Laurens ten Dam	Peter Sagan	Lloyd Mondory	Rabobank
6	Steven Kruijswijk	Damiano Cunego	Laurens ten Dam	Peter Sagan	Lloyd Mondory	Rabobank
7	Thomas De Gendt	Damiano Cunego	Andy Schleck	Peter Sagan	Lloyd Mondory	Leopard Trek
8	Peter Sagan	Damiano Cunego	Andy Schleck	Peter Sagan	Lloyd Mondory	Leopard Trek
9	Fabian Cancellara	Levi Leipheimer	Andy Schleck	Peter Sagan	Lloyd Mondory	Leopard Trek
Final		Levi Leipheimer	Andy Schleck	Peter Sagan	Lloyd Mondory	Leopard Trek
