= Alexis Rojas (cyclist) =

Colombian cyclist

Personal information
- Full name: José Alexis Rojas Díaz
- Born: 9 August 1972 (age 54) Bogotá, Colombia

Cycling career
- Sport: Cycling
- Current team: Pío Rico Cycling Team
- Discipline: Road
- Role: Rider (retired); Directeur sportif

Amateur teams
- 1994–1995: Manzana Postóbon
- 1999: Aguardiente Cristal–Chec
- 2000: Canel's Turbo
- 2001: Aguardiente Nectar
- 2012: Pío Rico

Professional teams
- 1996: Postobón–Manzana
- 1997–1998: Petróleos de Colombia–Ecopetrol
- 2000: Cantanhede–Marques de Marialva–Bairrada
- 2003: Maestro–Nella
- 2005: Tecos de la Universidad de Guadalajara
- 2007: Colombia es Pasión

Managerial team
- 2021–: Pío Rico Cycling Team

José Alexis Rojas Díaz (born August 9, 1972 in Bogotá) is a Colombian former road racing cyclist, who currently works as a directeur sportif for UCI Continental team Pío Rico Cycling Team.

== Major results ==
1995
1st Overall Clasica Alcaldía de Pasca
1996
2nd Overall Vuelta a Colombia
1998
10th Overall Vuelta a Colombia
2000
1st Overall Vuelta de Higuito
2001
1st Overall Clásica de Fusagasugá
2002
Vuelta a la Independencia Nacional

1st Stages 7 & 9

1st Stage 2 Vuelta a Colombia
1st Stage 1 Doble Copacabana Grand Prix Fides
9th Overall Clásico RCN
2003
1st Stage 1 Clásica de Fusagasugá
1st Stage 3 Vuelta a Antioquia
2004
1st Overall Vuelta al Tolima

1st Stage 2

3rd Overall Doble Sucre Potosí GP Cemento Fancesa
3rd Overall Vuelta a Chiriquí
