= Uberlino Mesa =

Colombian cyclist

Personal information
- Born: June 12, 1971 (age 55) Nobsa, Boyacá, Colombia

Cycling career
- Sport: Cycling
- Discipline: Road cycling
- Role: Rider

Uberlino Mesa Estepa (born June 12, 1971) is a retired male professional road cyclist from Colombia. He was the older brother of Ubaldo Mesa, who died while racing in Venezuela in 2005.

== Background ==
Mesa began cycling as a child. His grandmother loved cycling and was friends with the parents of Fabio Parra, which influenced his parents to give him and his brother bicycles.

Mesa would cycle in Europe with the Colombia - Selle Italia team for six years, in the peloton with Marco Pantani and other notable cyclists of the time.

In 2004, he was declared unfit to start due to an abnormal blood test before the Giro d'Italia, and was unable to participate in the race.

In 2005, Uberlino Mesa was cycling in Venezuela's Clásico Ciclístico Banfoandes with his brother when Ubaldo died of heart failure before the final stage of the race. After that time, Uberlino claimed he never had another good race after his brother's death. Mesa continued to race through 2010.

Uberlino Mesa was forced to give up cycling after fracturing his skull in a training accident near his home. After retiring from cycling, Mesa opened Waldo’s Cafe Bar in his hometown of Boyacá in honor of his brother.

== Career ==
1997
1st in General Classification Vuelta a Chiriquí (PAN)
2000
1st in General Classification Vuelta a Cundinamarca (COL)
7th in General Classification Vuelta a Colombia (COL)
2003
1st in Stage 13 Vuelta a Colombia, Cali (COL)
2nd in Tuta (COL)
3rd in Circuito de Combita (COL)
2004
1st in Stage 6 Clásico RCN, Sabaneta (COL)
2005
1st in Stage 11 Vuelta a Colombia, Mariquita (COL)
2007
1st in Circuito de Combita (COL)
Clásico RCN (COL)

1st in Stage 4, Envigado
10th in General Classification

Vuelta a Boyacà (COL)

1st in Stage 2, Paipa
3rd in General Classification

2008
1st in Stage 1 Vuelta a Cundinamarca, Cogua (COL)
Vuelta a Boyacà (COL)

1st in Stage 5, Jenesano
3rd in General Classification

2nd in General Classification Clásica Nacional Ciudad de Anapoima (COL)
3rd in Tuta (COL)
