= Fernando Camargo =

Colombian racing cyclist

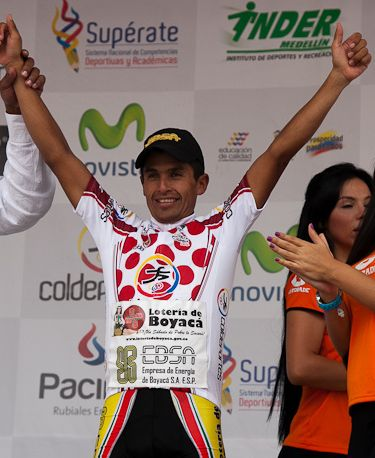
- Camargo in 2012.

Personal information
- Full name: Luis Fernando Camargo Flechas
- Nicknames: Veneno; Tenorio
- Born: 17 December 1977 (age 48) Paipa, Colombia

Cycling career
- Sport: Cycling
- Current team: Suspended
- Discipline: Road
- Role: Rider
- Rider type: Climber

Amateur teams
- 2007: Gobernación de Boyacá–Alcadía de Paipa
- 2009: Lotería de Boyacá
- 2010–2011: Boyacá Orgullo de América
- 2012: Lotería de Boyacá–EBSA
- 2013: EBSA–Indeportes Boyacá
- 2014–2015: Boyacá se atreve–LC Boyacá
- 2015: Formesan–Bogotá Humana
- 2015: Strongman–Campagnolo
- 2016–2017: Arroz Sonora–Dimonex

Luis Fernando Camargo Flechas (born December 17, 1977) is a Colombian road racing cyclist, who is currently suspended from the sport. He is nicknamed "Tenorio".

== Major results ==
2005
1st Stage 10 Vuelta a Colombia
2007
1st Stage 4 Vuelta a Colombia
2008
1st Overall Vuelta a Boyacà
1st Overall Vuelta a Bolivia

1st Stage 8a (ITT)

1st Stage 7 Clásico RCN
2009
1st Overall Vuelta al Ecuador

1st Stage 3

10th Overall Vuelta a Colombia
2010
3rd Overall Doble Sucre Potosí GP Cemento Fancesa
7th Overall Vuelta al Ecuador
2011
5th Overall Vuelta Ciclista a Costa Rica
2012
6th Overall Vuelta a Colombia

1st Mountains classification
1st Stages 9 & 11 (ITT)

2014
2nd Overall Vuelta a Colombia

1st Stage 9
