= Javier Alberto González =

Colombian bicycle racer

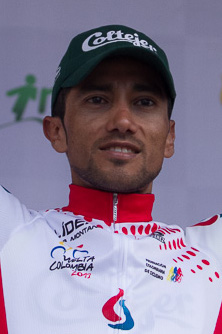
- González in 2013

Personal information
- Full name: Javier Alberto González Barrera
- Born: 13 November 1979 (age 46) Sogamoso, Colombia

Cycling career
- Sport: Cycling
- Current team: Retired
- Discipline: Road
- Role: Rider

Amateur teams
- 2002: 05 Orbitel
- 2006: Orbitel–EPM
- 2008–2009: Lotería de Boyacá
- 2013: Coltejer–Alcaldía de Manizales
- 2014: Boyacá se Atreve–Licibo

Professional teams
- 2001–2003: 05 Orbitel
- 2004: Saunier Duval–Prodir
- 2005: Andalucía–Paul Versan
- 2006: Massi
- 2007: UNE–Orbitel
- 2010–2011: EPM–UNE
- 2012: Colombia–Coldeportes

Javier Alberto González Barrera (born 13 November 1979 in Sogamoso) is a Colombian former professional cyclist, best known for winning the 2006 Clásico RCN.

== Major results ==
2003
1st Stage 2 Clásico RCN
2006
1st Overall Clásico RCN

1st Stage 3

1st Stage 3 Doble Sucre Potosí GP Cemento Fancesa
Vuelta a Colombia

1st Stages 3 & 10

1st Stage 5 Doble Copacabana Grand Prix Fides
2007
2nd Overall Clásico RCN

1st Stage 3

2008
1st Stage 3 Clásico RCN
2010
1st Stage 13 Vuelta a Colombia
