= Félix Cárdenas =

Colombian road bicycle racer

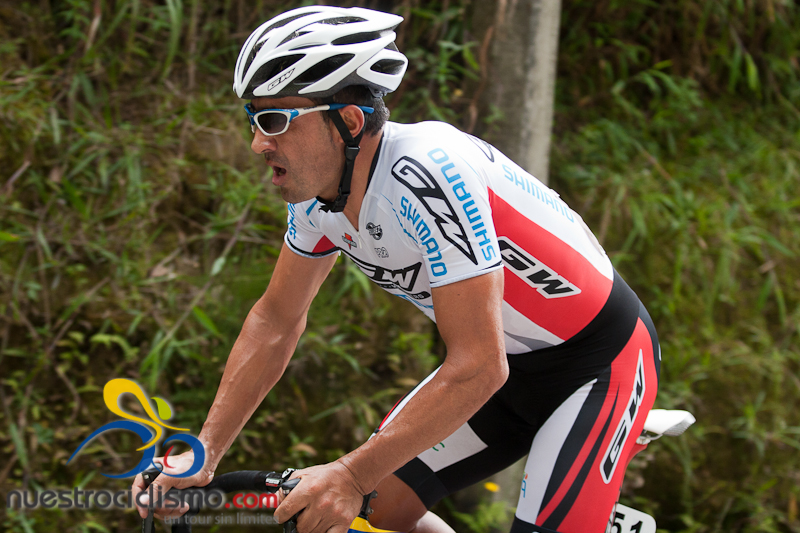

Personal information
- Full name: Félix Rafael Cárdenas Ravalo
- Born: November 24, 1973 (age 52) Encino, Santander, Colombia

Cycling career
- Sport: Cycling
- Current team: Retired
- Discipline: Road
- Role: Rider
- Rider type: Climbing specialist

Amateur teams
- 1995–1996: Pony Malta
- 1997: Lotería de Boyacá
- 1998: Petróleos de Colombia
- 1999: Lotería de Santander
- 2010–2012: GW–Shimano
- 2013–2014: Formesan–Bogotá Humana

Professional teams
- 2000–2001: Kelme–Costa Blanca
- 2002: Cage Maglierie
- 2003: 05 Orbitel
- 2003–2004: Cafés Baque
- 2005–2009: Barloworld

Managerial team
- 2017: GW–Shimano

Major wins
- Grand Tours Tour de France 1 individual stage (2001) Vuelta a España Mountains classification (2003, 2004) 3 individual stages (2000, 2003, 2004) One-day races and Classics National Road Race Championships (2010, 2012)

Félix Rafael Cárdenas Ravalo (born November 24, 1973, in Encino, Santander) is a Colombian former road bicycle racer, who competed both as an amateur and as a professional between 1995 and 2014. He previously rode for UCI Professional Continental team Barloworld until the team's demise in 2009.

In the 2001 Tour de France, Cardenas took one of the biggest victory of his career on the mountainous stage 12. He crossed the line solo in Ax-les-Thermes, with Roberto Laiseka and Lance Armstrong rounding the podium. He performed his trademark victory salute, standing on the pedals with arms raised high in the air.

== Major results ==
1996
Clásico RCN

1st Mountains classification
1st Stage 3

1998
6th Overall Clásico RCN
1999
3rd Overall Vuelta a Colombia
2000
1st Mountains classification Tour de Romandie
Tour du Limousin

1st Mountains classification
1st Stage 4

1st Stage 10 Vuelta a España
2001
1st Mountains classification Volta a Catalunya
1st Stage 12 Tour de France
10th Overall Euskal Bizikleta
2002
1st Stage 4 Giro del Trentino
Vuelta a Colombia

1st Stages 9 & 11

5th Giro della Romagna
7th Giro di Toscana
2003
1st Overall Vuelta a La Rioja

1st Mountains classification
1st Stage 3

1st Stage 4 Vuelta a Castilla y León
2nd Overall Vuelta a Colombia

1st Stages 7 & 11

4th Subida al Naranco
8th Overall Vuelta a España

1st Mountains classification
1st Stage 16

2004
Vuelta a España

1st Mountains classification
1st Stage 17

2nd Overall Clásico RCN
2nd Overall Vuelta a Asturias
7th Subida al Naranco
8th Gran Premio de Llodio
2005
1st Overall Tour of Japan

1st Points classification
1st Mountains classification
1st Stages 3 & 5

3rd Gran Premio Nobili Rubinetterie
10th Overall Vuelta a Aragón
2006
1st Prueba Villafranca de Ordizia
1st Gran Premio Industria e Commercio Artigianato Carnaghese
1st Stage 1 Brixia Tour
6th Overall Giro del Capo
9th Overall Peace Race
2007
2nd Overall Giro del Capo

1st Stage 1

2nd Overall Volta ao Alentejo
2nd Gran Premio Nobili Rubinetterie
7th Overall Settimana Ciclistica Lombarda
8th Trofeo Melinda
2008
6th Overall Giro del Capo
2009
6th Overall Tour Méditerranéen
7th Giro di Toscana
8th GP Industria & Artigianato di Larciano
2010
1st Road race, National Road Championships
1st Overall Clásico RCN
2011
1st Overall Vuelta a Colombia

1st Stage 4

2012
1st Road race, National Road Championships
1st Overall Vuelta a Colombia

1st Points classification
1st Stages 3, 4 & 10

2nd Overall Vuelta Ciclista de Chile

1st Stage 9

2013
1st Stage 9 Vuelta a Colombia
2014
1st Stage 8 Vuelta a Colombia
7th Overall Vuelta al Táchira
7th Overall Vuelta a la Independencia Nacional
