= John Parra =

Colombian cyclist

Personal information
- Full name: John Fredy Parra Celada
- Born: 9 November 1974 (age 51) Carepa, Antioquia, Colombia

Cycling career
- Sport: Cycling
- Current team: Retired
- Discipline: Road
- Role: Rider

Amateur teams
- 2003: Aguardiente Antioqueño–Lotería de Medellín
- 2010: Indeportes Antioquia

Professional teams
- 2006–2007: Tecos de la Universidad Autonoma de Guadalajara
- 2008: Toshiba-Santo
- 2009: Tecos de la Universidad Autonoma de Guadalajara
- 2011: Gobernación de Antioquia–Indeportes Antioquia
Medal record
Men's road bicycle racing
Representing Colombia
Pan American Championships
Gold medal – first place	2005 Mar del Plata	Road race

John Fredy Parra Celada (born November 9, 1974, in Carepa, Antioquia) is a Colombian former professional road cyclist.

== Major results ==
2002
1st Stage 4 Clásico RCN
2nd Road race, National Road Championships
2003
1st Overall Clàsica Gobernacion de Casanare

1st Stages 1 & 5

Vuelta a la Independencia Nacional

1st Stages 2, 3 & 6

1st Stage 1 Vuelta a Colombia
1st Stage 3 Clásico RCN
1st Prologue Vuelta a Guatemala
2004
1st Madison, Pan American Track Championships (with José Serpa)
2nd Overall Vuelta a Uraba
3rd Overall Clasico de Ejecutivos
2005
Pan American Championships

1st Road race
3rd Points race

1st Stage 8 Vuelta a la Independencia Nacional
2006
1st Stage 2 Tour de Beauce
1st Stage 2 Clásico Ciclístico Banfoandes
3rd Overall Vuelta Sonora
2007
1st Stage 8 Vuelta a Colombia
2nd Road race, National Road Championships
2nd Overall Vuelta a San Luis Potosi

1st Stage 5

3rd Univest Grand Prix
