= Óscar Álvarez (cyclist) =

Colombian cyclist

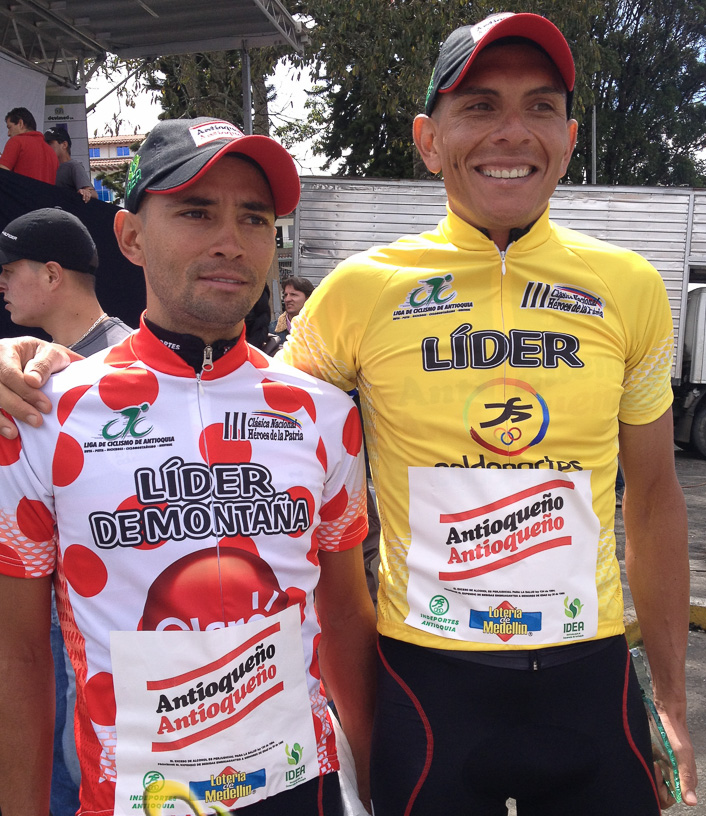

Personal information
- Full name: Óscar Mauricio Álvarez Paniagua
- Born: December 9, 1977 (age 48) Antioquia, Colombia

Cycling career
- Sport: Cycling
- Current team: Retired
- Discipline: Road
- Role: Rider

Amateur teams
- 2001: 05 Orbitel
- 2002: Aguardiente Antioqueño
- 2008–2009: UNE
- 2013–2014: Aguardiente Antioqueño–Lotería de Medellín–IDEA

Professional teams
- 2006: Caico Cycling Team
- 2007: UNE–Orbitel
- 2010: Café de Colombia–Colombia es Pasión
- 2011–2012: Gobernación de Antioquia–Indeportes Antioquia
- 2015–2016: EPM–UNE–Área Metropolitana

Major wins
- Clásica Nacional Marco Fidel Suárez (2004); Colombia National Road Champion (2009)
Medal record
Men's track cycling
Representing Colombia
Central American and Caribbean Games
Silver medal – second place	2002 San Salvador	Road race

Óscar Mauricio Álvarez Paniagua (born December 9, 1977, in Antioquia) is a Colombian former professional road cyclist.

== Major results ==
2002
2nd Road race, Central American and Caribbean Games
2003
1st Stage 1 Vuelta al Tolima
1st Stage 10 Vuelta a Colombia
2nd Overall Vuelta a las Americas
2004
1st Overall Clásica Nacional Marco Fidel Suárez
3rd Overall Vuelta a El Salvador

1st Stages 1 & 2

2006
1st Stage 7 Vuelta a Chiriquí
2009
1st Road race, National Road Championships
1st Stage 4 Clásica Ciudad de Girardot
5th Overall Vuelta a los Santanderes
2011
1st Stage 2a (TTT) Vuelta a Colombia
2014
1st Stage 1b Vuelta a Guatemala
