= Doble Copacabana Grand Prix Fides =

Race details
- Date: November
- Region: La Paz, Bolivia
- Discipline: Road race
- Competition: UCI America Tour
- Type: Stage race

History
- First edition: 1994
- Editions: 13
- Final edition: 2007
- First winner: Cristóbal Bustos (BOL)
- Most wins: Ismael Sarmiento (COL); Jairo Pérez (COL) (2 wins)
- Final winner: Óscar Soliz (BOL)

Doble Copacabana Grand Prix Fides was a cycling race held annually in Bolivia. It was part of the UCI America Tour in category 2.2.

== Winners ==
Year	Country	Rider	Team
1994	Bolivia	Cristóbal Bustos	
1996	Bolivia	Cid Martínez	
1997	Colombia	Graciano Fonseca	
1998	Colombia	Ismael Sarmiento	
1999	Colombia	Jairo Pérez	Aguardiente Néctar
2000	Colombia	Ismael Sarmiento	
2001	Colombia	Jairo Pérez	Lotería de Boyacá
2002	Colombia	Francisco Colorado	Aguardiente Antioqueño
2003	Colombia	Álvaro Sierra	
2004	Colombia	Javier Zapata	05 Orbitel
2005	Colombia	Libardo Niño	
2006	Colombia	Juan Diego Ramírez	05 Orbitel
2007	Bolivia	Óscar Soliz	
