= Fidel Chacón =

Colombian cyclist

Personal information
- Full name: Fidel Jeobani Chacón Skiner
- Born: 10 February 1980 (age 46)

Cycling career
- Sport: Cycling
- Current team: Retired
- Discipline: Road
- Role: Rider

Amateur teams
- 2004: Frutidelicias Frugos de Cali
- 2009–2010: GW–Shimano
- 2011: Redetrans–Supergiros–Indervalle–Emccali
- 2013–2014: GW–Shimano
- 2016: Mundial de Tornillos–Pijaos Web

Professional teams
- 2002–2003: Colombia–Selle Italia
- 2005: ASC–Chenco Jeans
- 2007: Vitória–ASC
- 2008: UNE

Fidel Jeobani Chacón Skiner (born 10 February 1980) is a Colombian former professional racing cyclist. He won the Colombian National Road Race Championships in 2007.

== Major results ==
2002
1st Stage 5 Clásico RCN
1st Stage 10 Vuelta al Táchira
1st Prologue & Stage 5 Tour du Sénégal
2003
1st Stage 2 Vuelta a Guatemala
2005
1st Clásica Rafael Mora Vidal
1st Stage 1 Volta a Portugal
3rd Overall Clásica de Fusagasugá

1st Stage 1

2006
8th Gran Premio Área Metropolitana de Vigo
2007
1st Road race, National Road Championships
2009
1st Stage 3 Clásico RCN
1st Prologue Vuelta a Colombia
2010
1st Clásica Rafael Mora Vidal
