= Hugo Osorio =

Salvadoran serial killer (born 1970)

- Born: Hugo Ernesto Osorio Chávez; 1970 (age 55–56); El Salvador
- Status: Incarcerated
- Penalty: 70 years

Details
- Victims: 14–40
- Span of crimes: 2019–2021
- Country: El Salvador
- State: Santa Ana
- Date apprehended: 7 May 2021

Hugo Ernesto Osorio Chávez (born 1970) is a Salvadoran serial killer. Nicknamed "The Psychopath of Chalchuapa" (Spanish: El Psicópata de Chalchuapa), he was convicted of murdering 14 people, whom he had buried in his home.

== Biography ==
Osorio worked as a police officer and was an alleged member of an organized criminal group. He killed several people whose bodies he buried in his home in Chalchuapa. Most of his victims were women whom he lured with deception through social networks, in which he offered employment to them, such as the opportunity to immigrate to the United States, or simply invited them on romantic dates. Once they came to his home, he subdued, raped, and murdered them. It is known that his last two victims, a 57-year-old woman and her 26-year-old daughter, were beaten to death with a pipe. When he was arrested on 7 May 2021, he confessed to the murders to the police.

Osorio was convicted of the murders and sentenced to 70 years in prison on 10 June 2022.
