= Daniel Rincón (cyclist) =

Colombian road cyclist (born 1975)

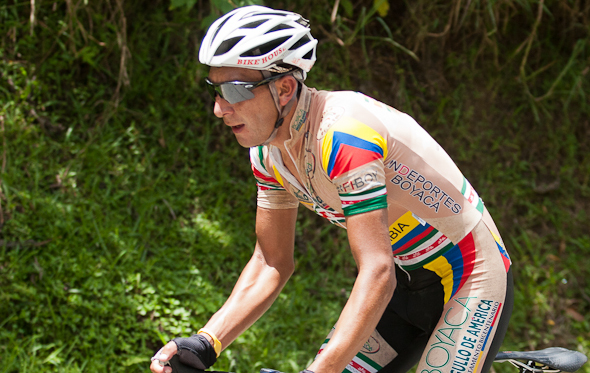

Personal information
- Full name: José Daniel Rincón Quintana
- Born: 4 December 1975 (age 50) Duitama, Boyacá, Colombia

Cycling career
- Sport: Cycling
- Current team: Retired
- Discipline: Road
- Role: Rider

Amateur teams
- 1997–1998: Lotería de Boyacá
- 2005: 05 Orbitel
- 2008: UNE
- 2010–2011: Boyacá es Para Vivirla–Orgullo de América
- 2012: GW–Shimano

Professional teams
- 2000–2002: 05 Orbitel
- 2004: U.S. Postal Service
- 2007: Colombia es Pasión
Medal record
Men's road bicycle racing
Representing Colombia
Pan American Championships
Gold medal – first place	2002 Quito	Road race

José Daniel Rincón Quintana (born 4 December 1975) is a Colombian former professional road cyclist. He is the younger brother of Oliverio Rincón.

== Major results ==
2001
1st Road race, National Road Championships
1st Overall Clasica Alcaldía de Pasca
2002
1st Road race, Pan American Road Championships
1st Overall Clásica de Fusagasugá
2nd Overall Clásico RCN

1st Stage 3

2003
4th Overall Vuelta a Colombia

1st Stage 4

2005
1st Stage 8 Vuelta a Colombia
2nd Overall Vuelta al Tolima
2006
2nd Overall Vuelta a Colombia

1st Stage 10 (TTT)

1st Overall Clásica Club Deportivo Boyacá

1st Stage 1

2007
1st Overall Vuelta a Cundinamarca

1st Stages 2 & 3

1st Overall Clásica Club Deportivo Boyacá
1st Stage 1 Vuelta a Boyacà
2008
1st Overall Clásica Club Deportivo Boyacá

1st Prologue & Stage 3

1st Overall Clásica Nacional Marco Fidel Suárez

1st Stage 4

1st Stage 1 Vuelta a Boyacà
1st Stage 2 Clasica de Guarné
2009
1st Overall Clasica Alcaldía de Pasca

1st Prologue

1st Stage 2 Vuelta a Cundinamarca
3rd Overall Clásica de Rionegro
2010
1st Stage 4 Doble Sucre Potosí GP Cemento Fancesa
2nd Overall Vuelta Mexico Telmex
2012
7th Overall Vuelta Ciclista de Chile
