= Vladimir González =

Colombian cyclist

Personal information
- Born: October 16, 1978 (age 47) Colombia

Cycling career
- Sport: Cycling
- Discipline: Road cycling
- Role: Rider

Major wins
- 1st in the Flemish Classic (2003)

Vladimir González Martínez (born October 16, 1978) is a male road cyclist from Colombia.

== Career ==
2001
3rd in Colombia National Championships, Road, ITT, Elite, Colombia (COL)
2003
1st in Clasica Independencia Ciudad de Flandes (COL)
2005
1st in Stage 6 Vuelta a Colombia, Santa Rosa Cabal (COL)
