= Mauricio Soler =

Colombian cyclist

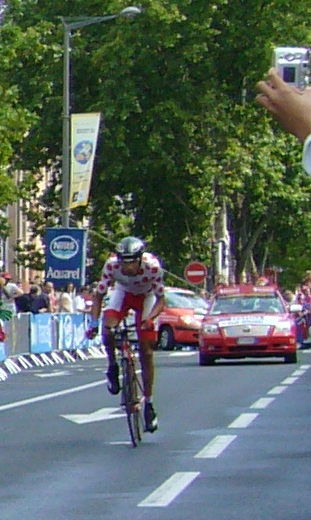

Personal information
- Full name: Juan Mauricio Soler Hernández
- Nickname: El Lancero
- Born: 14 January 1983 (age 43) Ramiriquí, Colombia
- Height: 1.90 m (6 ft 3 in)
- Weight: 70 kg (154 lb; 11 st 0 lb)

Cycling career
- Sport: Cycling
- Current team: Retired
- Discipline: Road
- Role: Rider
- Rider type: Climbing specialist

Professional teams
- 2006: Acqua & Sapone
- 2007–2009: Barloworld
- 2010–2011: Caisse d'Epargne

Major wins
- Grand Tours Tour de France Mountains classification (2007) 1 individual stage (2007)

Juan Mauricio Soler Hernández (born 14 January 1983 in Ramiriquí, Boyacá) is a Colombian former professional road bicycle racer, who last rode for UCI ProTour team Movistar Team. He competed in the Tour de France for the first time in 2007, winning stage 9, having broken away on the Col du Galibier. He won that year's King of the Mountains title. Soler stated the stage win was "a victory from heaven. It is the biggest win of my life, and in my first Tour de France. I didn't think it would come so quickly." He finished 11th overall that year. Soler had a career-ending crash in the 2011 Tour de Suisse.

== Career ==
Soler began racing at the age of 17; he stated a race in his village is what made him decide to become a professional cyclist. Upon becoming a professional, Soler spent a year racing in his native Colombia and soon after joined the Acqua & Sapone team where he was guided by Claudio Corti, who later brought him to the Barloworld team.

Soler made his Tour debut in the 2007 Tour de France, where he won the ninth stage, and won the mountains classification.

Soler's 2008 tour dreams were shattered, after having crashed in the final kilometers of the first stage. He was forced to drop out after a CT scan showed a microfracture in his wrist.

Having made the switch to the Caisse D'Epargne team in 2010, he was due to compete in that year's Tour de France, his first in two seasons, and was favoured to be among the top 20 riders. However, due to a knee injury sustained following a crash in the Critérium du Dauphiné, he was not fit to take part in the Tour de France.

After his long history of injuries and illnesses, Soler won his first race in four years Sunday 12 June 2011 by winning stage 2 of the Tour de Suisse with its difficult mountain top finish. It marked a return to his status as a world class climber; Soler and his team were poised compete in the Tour de France in July.

=== Tour de Suisse crash ===
On Thursday 16 June 2011, early in stage six of the Tour de Suisse and while in second place in the general classification, Soler hit a small raised piece of curbing from an adjacent footpath at a speed of approximately 80 km/h. He hit a spectator and was thrown into a solid fence. He suffered a fractured skull, a cerebral edema, other fractures and hematomas. Soler was placed in a medically induced coma. Within two days he had shown signs of improvement but was still in the coma, and by 8 July 2011 his condition had stabilized enough for him to be moved to Spain. On the same date, VeloNews quoted an unnamed source saying that Soler showed signs of "serious cognitive deficits" due to his head injury. In January 2012 it was reported in VeloNews that Soler had moved back to Colombia to begin his recuperation. In a meeting with reporters, Soler reported that he was still weak and easily fatigued.

On 17 July 2012, Soler announced that he would not attempt to return to professional cycling.

== Major results ==
2005
1st Stage 14 Vuelta a Colombia
2006
1st Overall Circuit de Lorraine

1st Stage 2

7th Tre Valli Varesine
2007
1st Overall Vuelta a Burgos

1st Stage 2

Tour de France

1st Mountains classification
1st Stage 9

2nd Milano–Torino
2008
2nd Overall Vuelta a Castilla y León
2009
2nd Overall Settimana Lombarda
5th Overall Vuelta a Burgos
6th Trofeo Melinda
9th Overall Settimana Internazionale di Coppi e Bartali
2011
1st Stage 2 Tour de Suisse
