= Hernán Buenahora =

Colombian cyclist

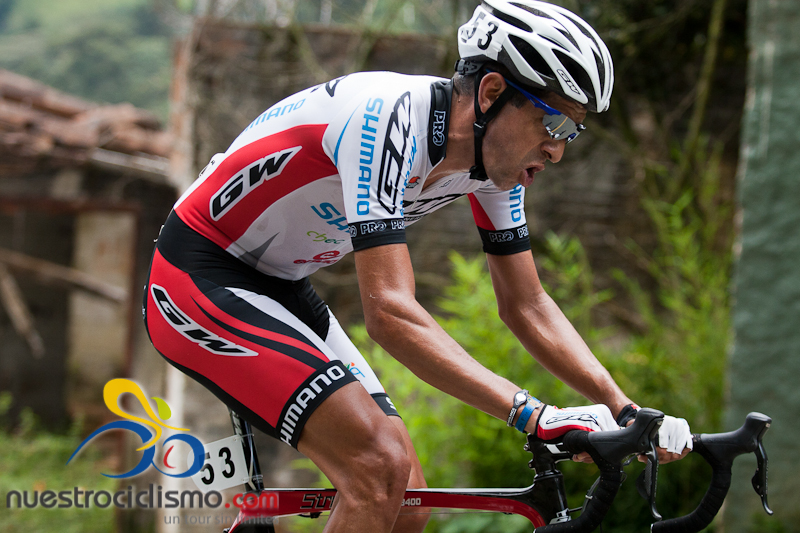

Personal information
- Full name: Hernán Buenahora Gutíerrez
- Nickname: El Cabrito de Barichara
- Born: 18 March 1967 (age 59) Barichara, Santander, Colombia

Cycling career
- Sport: Cycling
- Current team: Retired
- Discipline: Road
- Role: Rider
- Rider type: Climber

Amateur teams
- 2005–2006: Alcaldía de Cabimas
- 2007–2008: Lotería de Boyacá
- 2010: Formesan
- 2011: GW–Shimano

Professional teams
- 1990: Café de Colombia
- 1991–1997: Kelme–Ibexpress
- 1998–1999: Vitalicio Seguros
- 2000–2001: Aguardiente Néctar–Selle Italia
- 2002: Cage Maglierie–Olmo
- 2003: 05 Orbitel
- 2003–2004: Labarca-2–Café Baqué

Major wins
- Grand Tours Tour de France Combativity classification (1995) Stage races Volta a Catalunya (1998)

Hernán Buenahora Gutíerrez (born 18 March 1967) is a Colombian former road racing cyclist, who was nicknamed El Cabrito de Barichara during his career. He turned professional in 1990 and placed 18th in the 1994 Tour de France, 10th in the 1995 Tour, 22nd in the 1997 Tour, and 64th in the 1999 Tour.

Riding in the 2006–07 UCI America Tour events, Buenahora won the overall titles of the Clasico Ciclistico Banfoandes and the Vuelta al Táchira, riding for the Gobernación del Zulia – Alcaldía de Cabimas cycling team. In the prior season, he had been disqualified in the Vuelta al Colombia when, whilst leading the race, he had a non-negative doping control. However, Buenahora still managed to finish second overall.

== Major results ==
1989
1st Stage 12 Vuelta a Mexico
2nd Overall Ronde de l'Isard
1990
1st Stage 5 Vuelta al Táchira
5th Overall Clásico RCN
6th Overall Vuelta a Colombia

1st Stage 7

1991
8th Overall Vuelta a Murcia
1992
6th Overall Vuelta a Aragón
10th Overall Critérium du Dauphiné Libéré
1994
1st Stage 11 Vuelta a Colombia
1995
10th Overall Tour de France

1st Combativity award Stage 11 & Overall

1996
1st Stage 11 Vuelta a Colombia
1997
1st Stage 3 Vuelta a Colombia
1998
1st Overall Volta a Catalunya

1st Stages 6 & 7

1999
8th Overall Volta a Catalunya
9th Overall Giro del Trentino
2000
6th Overall Giro d'Italia
6th Overall Grande Prémio Jornal de Notícias
2001
1st Overall Vuelta a Colombia

1st Stages 6, 7, 9 & 15 (ITT)

2002
6th Giro del Friuli
2003
3rd Overall Vuelta a Asturias
2004
1st Overall Clásico RCN

1st Prologue & Stage 7 (ITT)

2005
1st Stage 13 Vuelta a Colombia
2006
1st Overall Clasico Ciclistico Banfoandes
1st Stage 13 Vuelta a Colombia
3rd Overall Vuelta al Táchira

1st Stage 6

2007
1st Overall Vuelta al Táchira

1st Stages 4 & 12 (ITT)

2nd Overall Vuelta a Colombia
2008
2nd Overall Vuelta a Colombia

1st Stages 8 (ITT) & 11

=== Grand Tour general classification results timeline ===
Grand Tour	1991	1992	1993	1994	1995	1996	1997	1998	1999	2000	2001	2002	2003	2004
Giro d'Italia	—	—	DNF	DNF	18	11	DNF	27	15	6	13	—	—	—
Tour de France	—	—	—	18	10	DNF	22	DNF	64	—	—	—	—	—
/ Vuelta a España	DNF	16	13	—	—	DNF	—	—	—	—	—	—	—	32
