= Libardo Niño =

Colombian cyclist (born 1968)

Personal information
- Born: 26 September 1968 (age 58) Paipa, Colombia

Cycling career
- Sport: Cycling
- Discipline: Road
- Role: Rider

Professional teams
- 1994–1996: Kelme–Avianca–Gios
- 1997: Gaseosas Glacial
- 1998–2000: Aguardiente Nectar-Selle Italia
- 2011: LeTua Cycling Team
Medal record
Men's road bicycle racing
Representing Colombia
Pan American Championships
Gold medal – first place	2007 Valencia	Time trial

Libardo Niño Corredor (born 26 September 1968) is a male road racing cyclist from Colombia. He competed for his native country at the 1992 Summer Olympics, finishing in 76th place in the individual road race. Colombia competed with three cyclists in this event; the other ones being José Robles (49th) and Héctor Palacio (52nd).

== Major results ==
1993
Vuelta a Colombia

1st Prologue & Stages 8 & 14

1994
3rd Overall Clásico RCN

1st Stages 4, 5 & 6

1995
5th Overall Vuelta a Colombia

1st Stage 4

1st Stage 7 Clásico RCN
1997
9th Overall Vuelta a Colombia
1998
1st Stage 9 Ruta Mexico
3rd Overall Vuelta a Colombia
2001
1st Stage 10 Vuelta a Colombia
2002
3rd Overall Vuelta a Colombia
2003
1st Overall Vuelta a Colombia

1st Points classification
1st Stage 5

1st Stage 9 Vuelta a Guatemala
2004
1st Overall Vuelta a Colombia

1st Points classification
1st Prologue & Stage 4

2nd Time trial, National Road Championships
2005
1st Overall Vuelta a Colombia

1st Points classification
1st Stage 5

1st Overall Clásico RCN

1st Stage 3

2006
1st Time trial, National Road Championships
2nd Overall Vuelta a El Salvador

1st Mountains classification
1st Stages 4 & 7

2nd Overall Clásico RCN

1st Mountains classification
1st Stage 6

4th Time trial, Central American and Caribbean Games
5th Time trial, Pan American Road and Track Championships
2007
1st Time trial, Pan American Road and Track Championships
1st Overall Clásico RCN
3rd Overall Doble Copacabana Grand Prix Fides

1st Stage 5b

6th Overall Vuelta a Colombia
8th Overall Doble Sucre Potosí GP Cemento Fancesa
2009
1st Overall Vuelta Ciclista Chiapas

1st Stage 1 (ITT)

4th Overall Vuelta a Bolivia
2010
2nd Overall Doble Sucre Potosí GP Cemento Fancesa
4th Overall Vuelta al Ecuador
2011
2nd Overall Tour de Langkawi
2nd Overall International Presidency Tour

1st Stage 1
