= Víctor Niño =

Colombian cyclist (born 1973)

Victor Niño
Personal information
- Full name: Victor Niño Corredor
- Nickname: La Chicharra
- Born: 4 June 1973 (age 53) Paipa, Boyacá, Colombia

Cycling career
- Sport: Cycling
- Discipline: Road
- Role: Rider

Amateur teams
- 1995: Agua Natural Glacial
- 1997: Gaseosas Glacial
- 1998: Aguardiente Néctar–Selle Italia
- 1999–2006: Lotería de Boyacá–Apuestas Chiquinquirá
- 2004: Dos Pinos–Banex
- 2007–2011: EBSA–Coordinadora de Boyacá
- 2009: Mauricio Báez
- 2009: Pio Rico
- 2010: Orven
- 2012: Lotería de Boyacá–Indeportes Boyacá
- 2013: EBSA–Indeportes Boyacá

Professional teams
- 1996: Glacial–Selle Italia
- 2012: Azad University Cross Team
- 2013: RTS Racing Team
- 2014: Start–Trigon Cycling Team
- 2014–2016: RTS–Santic Racing Team
- 2017–2018: Team Sapura Cycling

Victor Niño Corredor (born 4 June 1973 in Paipa, Boyacá) is a Colombian professional racing cyclist. He was nicknamed "La Chicharra" during his career.

== Major results ==
1998
1st Stage 5 Vuelta a Guatemala
2nd Overall Vuelta Ciclista a Costa Rica
1999
9th Overall Vuelta a Colombia
2001
1st Mountains classification Vuelta a Colombia
7th Overall Clásico RCN
2002
1st Stage 2 Vuelta al Tolima
5th Overall Clásico RCN
2003
3rd Overall Vuelta al Tolima
2004
1st Overall Vuelta a Boyacá
1st Overall Clásica de la Consolación
1st Stage 4 Vuelta al Tolima
1st Stage 2 Vuelta a Antioquia
6th Overall Vuelta a Venezuela
9th Overall Vuelta Ciclista a Costa Rica

1st Stage 11

2005
1st Overall Clasica del Meta
1st Stage 12 Vuelta a Colombia
6th Overall Doble Copacabana Grand Prix Fides

1st Stage 3 (TTT)

6th Overall Clásico RCN
2006
1st Stage 2 Doble Sucre Potosí GP Cemento Fancesa
3rd Overall Clásica Nacional Ciudad de Anapoima
8th Overall Doble Copacabana Grand Prix Fides
2007
1st Stage 4 Doble Sucre Potosí GP Cemento Fancesa
3rd Overall Clásica Ciudad de Girardot
4th Overall Doble Copacabana Grand Prix Fides
8th Overall Vuelta a Colombia
2008
2nd Overall Clasica Alcaldía de Pasca

1st Prologue

2nd Overall Vuelta a Boyacà

1st Stage 6

4th Overall Clásico RCN
6th Overall Vuelta a Colombia
2009
3rd Overall Doble Sucre Potosí GP Cemento Fancesa
3rd Overall Vuelta Ciclista Chiapas
5th Overall Vuelta a Bolivia
6th Overall Vuelta a la Independencia Nacional

1st Stage 4

9th Overall Clásico RCN
2010
4th Overall Vuelta Mexico Telmex
5th Overall Clásica Ciudad de Girardot
6th Overall Doble Sucre Potosí GP Cemento Fancesa
9th Overall Clásico RCN
2011
1st Overall Vuelta a Boyacà

1st Stage 4

3rd Overall Vuelta a Cundinamarca
4th Overall Vuelta a Bolivia
5th Overall Clásica Club Deportivo Boyacá
6th Overall Vuelta a Colombia
6th Overall Vuelta Ciclista Chiapas

1st Stage 4

2012
3rd Overall Tour de Langkawi
5th Overall Vuelta a Colombia
8th Overall Tour de Taiwan

1st Stage 6

2014
1st Mountains classification Tour of China I
10th Overall Tour of Fuzhou
2015
9th Overall Vuelta a Guatemala
2016
10th Overall Tour of Fuzhou
2017
2nd Overall Jelajah Malaysia
3rd Overall Tour de Ijen
8th Overall Tour de Singkarak
2018
8th Overall Tour de Lombok Mandalika
