= Javier de Jesús Zapata =

Colombian cyclist (born 1969)

Personal information
- Full name: Javier de Jesús Zapata Villada
- Nickname: El Milagroso
- Born: 16 October 1969 (age 57) Itagüí, Antioquia, Colombia
- Height: 1.72 m (5 ft 8 in)
- Weight: 62 kg (137 lb)

Cycling career
- Sport: Cycling
- Current team: Retired
- Discipline: Road
- Role: Rider

Amateur team
- 2009: Indeportes Antioquia

Professional teams
- 1993–1996: Aguardiente Antioqueño
- 1997: Gobernacion de Antioquia
- 1998: Kross–Selle Italia
- 2001–2004: 05 Orbitel
- 2007–2008: Caico

Javier de Jesús Zapata Villada (born 16 October 1969) is a Colombian former road racing cyclist, who was a professional rider from 1993 to 2004. He was nicknamed "El Milagroso" during his career.

== Major results ==
1993
1st Overall Vuelta a Antioquia
1st Stage 12 Vuelta a Colombia
2nd Road race, National Road Championships
1994
National Road Championships

2nd Road race
2nd Time trial

1995
1st Overall Vuelta al Valle del Cauca
1996
2nd Road race, National Road Championships
1997
1st Overall Vuelta a Venezuela
1st Overall Vuelta al Valle del Cauca
2nd Overall Clásico RCN

1st Stage 1

1999
1st in Stage 1 Clásico RCN, Barbosa (COL)
2000
1st Overall Vuelta a Antioquia
1st Stage 4 Vuelta a la Argentina
2001
1st Overall Vuelta a Antioquia
1st Overall Vuelta al Valle del Cauca
1st Stage 5 Vuelta a Colombia
National Road Championships

2nd Time trial
3rd Road race

10th Overall Clásico RCN
2003
1st Overall Vuelta de la Paz

1st Stage 3a

1st Stage 6 Clásico RCN
2nd Overall Vuelta a Cundinamarca

1st Stage 4

3rd Overall Vuelta a Boyacá
3rd Overall Vuelta a los Santanderes

1st Stage 3

2004
1st Overall Doble Sucre Potosí GP Cemento Fancesa

1st Stages 1 & 4

1st Overall Doble Copacabana GP Fides

1st Stages 1, 3 & 6b

1st Stage 3 GP Mundo Ciclistico
1st Overall Clasico de Ejecutivos

1st Stages 1 & 2

2nd Overall Vuelta de la Paz
3rd Overall Clásica Club Deportivo Boyacá
10th Overall Clásico RCN

1st Stage 5

2005
1st Overall Clásica de Fusagasugá

1st Stage 2

1st Overall Clásica Nacional Marco Fidel Suárez

1st Stages 2 & 4

1st Stage 4 Vuelta a Colombia
1st Stages 2 & 4 Clásico RCN
1st Stage 2 Doble Copacabana GP Fides
1st Stage 4 Vuelta al Tolima
2nd Time trial, National Road Championships
2006
1st Stage 10 (TTT) Vuelta a Colombia
1st Stage 2 Vuelta a Antioquia
1st Stages 2 & 5b Doble Copacabana GP Fides
1st Stage 1 Clasica International de Tulcan
1st Stage 2b Clásica de Fusagasugá
3rd Overall Clásico RCN
3rd Overall Doble Sucre Potosí GP Cemento Fancesa
3rd Overall Clásica Ciudad de Girardot

1st Stage 4

2007
1st Overall Tour of Virginia

1st Stage 2

1st Overall Clásica Ciudad de Girardot
1st Jin Mao Climb
2nd Overall Doble Copacabana GP Fides
2nd Overall Clásica Nacional Ciudad de Anapoima

1st Stage 2

7th Overall Clásico RCN

1st Prologue

2008
2nd Overall Vuelta a Antioquia

1st Stage 4

2nd Overall Clásica Ciudad de Girardot

1st Stage 4

10th Overall Vuelta a Bolivia

1st Stage 7a

2009
3rd Time trial, National Road Championships
