= Graciano Fonseca =

Colombian cyclist

Personal information
- Born: September 4, 1974 (age 52) Soracá, Boyacá, Colombia

Cycling career
- Sport: Cycling
- Current team: Retired
- Role: Rider

Major wins
- 1st in the Columbia National Championships (2004)

Graciano Fonseca Fuken (born September 4, 1974, in Soracá, Boyacá) is a retired male professional road racing cyclist from Colombia.

In 2005, he won Stage 7 of the Vuelta a Colombia.

== Major results ==
1996
1st in General Classification Vuelta a Guatemala (GUA)
2001
1st in Stage 13 Vuelta a Colombia, Tunja (COL)
2003
1st in Stage 2 Clásica de Fusagasugá, Alto de San Miguel-Sibaté-Canoas-Soacha (COL)
1st in Stage 3 Clásica de Fusagasugá, Fusagasugá (COL)
2nd in General Classification Clásica de Fusagasugá (COL)
2004
2nd in Colombia National Championships, Road, Elite, Colombia (COL)
2005
1st in Stage 3 Clásica de Fusagasugá, Circuito de Fusagasugá (COL)
1st in Stage 1 Vuelta a Boyacà, Sogamoso (COL)
2nd in General Classification Vuelta a Boyacà (COL)
1st in Stage 7 Vuelta a Colombia, Medellin (Alto de Santa Helena) (COL)
1st in Stage 5 Clásico RCN, Tunja (COL)
1st in Stage 3 Doble Copacabana GP Fides, TTT, La Paz (BOL)

alongside Libardo Niño, Víctor Niño, Freddy Montaña, Iván Casas, and Israel Ochoa

2008
4th in General Classification Vuelta a Bolivia (BOL)
