= Jhon García =

Colombian cyclist

Personal information
- Full name: Jhon Freddy García Fería
- Born: 25 May 1974 (age 52) Buga, Valle del Cauca, Colombia

Cycling career
- Sport: Cycling
- Current team: Retired
- Discipline: Road
- Role: Rider

Professional teams
- 2000–2003: Aguardiente Néctar–Selle Italia
- 2004: 05 Orbitel
- 2008–2009: UNE
- 2012: Coldeportes–Comcel

Jhon Freddy García Fería (born 25 May 1974 in Buga, Valle del Cauca) is a former professional track and road racing cyclist from Colombia.

== Major results ==
2000
1st Overall Vuelta al Valle del Cauca
1st Stage 10 Vuelta a Colombia
1st Stages 3 & 4 Clásico RCN
2001
1st Stage 2 Tour du Maroc
2002
1st National Road Race Championships
1st Stage 14 Vuelta a Colombia
2003
1st Stage 3 Vuelta al Valle del Cauca
2004
1st Overall Vuelta al Valle del Cauca
1st Stage 3 Vuelta a Boyacà
1st Stage 5 Vuelta a Antioquia
1st Stages 10 & 11 Vuelta a Colombia
2005
1st Stage 3 Vuelta al Valle del Cauca
3rd Overall Vuelta a Antioquia

1st Stages 1, 2, 5 & 6

2006
1st Overall Vuelta al Valle del Cauca, (COL)
3rd National Road Race Championships
2nd (silver) Road race, Central American and Caribbean Games
1st Stages 4 & 10 Vuelta a Colombia
1st Stage 1 Clásico RCN
1st Stage 11 Vuelta a Chiriquí
2007
1st Stage 2 Vuelta al Tolima
1st Stage 6 Clásico RCN
2nd Overall Vuelta a Chiriquí

1st Stages 1b, 3 (TTT) & 7

2008
1st Stage 2 Vuelta a Colombia
1st Stage 8 Clásico RCN
2009
1st Stage 1 Vuelta al Valle del Cauca
1st Stage 5 Vuelta a Antioquia
