= Doble Sucre Potosí GP Cemento Fancesa =

Doble Sucre Potosi GP Cemento Fancesa
Race details
- Date: May
- Region: Bolivia
- Discipline: Road race
- Competition: UCI America Tour
- Type: Stage race

History
- First edition: 2000
- Editions: 11
- Final edition: 2010
- First winner: Raul Escobar (BOL)
- Most wins: Álvaro Sierra (COL); Óscar Soliz (BOL)(2 wins)
- Final winner: Óscar Soliz (BOL)

Doble Sucre Potosi GP Cemento Fancesa was a cycling race held annually in Bolivia. It was part of the UCI America Tour in category 2.2.

== Winners ==
Year	Country	Rider	Team
2000	Bolivia	Raul Escobar	
2001	Peru	Alfredo Reinoso	
2002	Venezuela	Manuel Guevara	Lotería del Táchira
2003	Colombia	Álvaro Sierra	
2004	Colombia	Javier de Jesús Zapata	05 Orbitel
2005	Colombia	Álvaro Sierra	
2006	Colombia	Alejandro Ramírez	Orbitel–EPM
2007	Bolivia	Óscar Soliz	
2008	Ecuador	Byron Guamá	Canel's Turbo
2009	Colombia	Ferney Bello	
2010	Bolivia	Óscar Soliz	
