= 2007 Vuelta a Colombia =

2006–07 UCI America Tour

Race details
- Dates: July 28 – August 12, 2007
- Stages: 14
- Distance: 2,253.4 km (1,400.2 mi)
- Winning time: 57h 03' 19"

Results
| Jersey awarded to the overall winner | Winner | Santiago Botero (COL) | (Une Orbitel) |
| | Second | Hernán Buenahora (COL) | (Lotería de Boyacá) |
| | Third | Israel Ochoa (COL) | (Lotería de Boyacá) |
| | Mountains | Hernán Buenahora (COL) | (Lotería de Boyacá) |
| | Team | Lotería de Boyacá | |

The 57th edition of the Vuelta a Colombia was held from July 28 to August 12, 2007.

== Stages ==
=== 2007-07-28: Barranquilla — Barranquilla (6.6 km) ===
| Place | Prologue | | General Classification | |
| Place | Name | Time | Name | Time |
|---|---|---|---|---|
| 1. | Santiago Botero (COL) | 07.37 | Santiago Botero (COL) | 07.37 |
| 2. | Libardo Niño (COL) | +0.08 | Libardo Niño (COL) | +0.08 |
| 3. | Jhon García (COL) | +0.14 | Jhon García (COL) | +0.14 |

=== 2007-07-29: Barranquilla — Aracataca (122.4 km) ===
| Place | Stage 1 | | General Classification | |
| Place | Name | Time | Name | Time |
|---|---|---|---|---|
| 1. | Miguel Chacón (VEN) | 02:48.38 | Santiago Botero (COL) | 02:56.15 |
| 2. | Jairo Salas (COL) | — | Libardo Niño (COL) | +0.08 |
| 3. | Juan Pablo Magallanes (MEX) | — | Jhon García (COL) | +0.13 |

=== 2007-07-31: Aguachica — Barrancabermeja (189 km) ===
| Place | Stage 2 | | General Classification | |
| Place | Name | Time | Name | Time |
|---|---|---|---|---|
| 1. | Félix Castro (COL) | 04:26.20 | Santiago Botero (COL) | 07:22.37 |
| 2. | Héctor Rangel (MEX) | — | Libardo Niño (COL) | +0.08 |
| 3. | Jhon García (COL) | +0.02 | Jhon García (COL) | +0.09 |

=== 2007-08-01: Barrancabermeja — Piedecuesta (125 km) ===
| Place | Stage 3 | | General Classification | |
| Place | Name | Time | Name | Time |
|---|---|---|---|---|
| 1. | Manuel Medina (VEN) | 02:56.50 | Manuel Medina (VEN) | 10:19.59 |
| 2. | Mauricio Ortega (COL) | — | Mauricio Ortega (COL) | +0.02 |
| 3. | Gregorio Ladino (COL) | +1.32 | Santiago Botero (COL) | +1.11 |

=== 2007-08-02: Socorro — Paipa (213 km) ===
| Place | Stage 4 | | General Classification | |
| Place | Name | Time | Name | Time |
|---|---|---|---|---|
| 1. | Fernando Camargo (COL) | 05:38.06 | Fernando Camargo (COL) | 16:00.05 |
| 2. | Graciano Fonseca (COL) | +1.41 | Mauricio Ortega (COL) | +0.40 |
| 3. | Hernán Buenahora (COL) | +1.51 | Manuel Medina (VEN) | +0.47 |

=== 2007-08-03: Paipa — La Vega (232.7 km) ===
| Place | Stage 5 | | General Classification | |
| Place | Name | Time | Name | Time |
|---|---|---|---|---|
| 1. | Jairo Pérez (COL) | 05:45.44 | Jairo Pérez (COL) | 21:49.50 |
| 2. | Jackson Rodríguez (VEN) | +2.33 | Mauricio Ortega (COL) | +1.25 |
| 3. | Samuel Cabrera (COL) | +2.55 | Fernando Camargo (COL) | +1.26 |

=== 2007-08-04: Mariquita — Manizales (123.6 km) ===
| Place | Stage 6 | | General Classification | |
| Place | Name | Time | Name | Time |
|---|---|---|---|---|
| 1. | Santiago Botero (COL) | 04:48.12 | Santiago Botero (COL) | 25:40.38 |
| 2. | Mauricio Ortega (COL) | +3.40 | Mauricio Ortega (COL) | +2.23 |
| 3. | Hernán Buenahora (COL) | +5.18 | Hernán Buenahora (COL) | +4.54 |

=== 2007-08-05: Manizales — Las Palmas (201.4 km) ===
| Place | Stage 7 | | General Classification | |
| Place | Name | Time | Name | Time |
|---|---|---|---|---|
| 1. | Manuel Medina (VEN) | 05:37.05 | Santiago Botero (COL) | 31:21.48 |
| 2. | Graciano Fonseca (COL) | +1.13 | Mauricio Ortega (COL) | +1.05 |
| 3. | Víctor Niño (COL) | +1.47 | Hernán Buenahora (COL) | +2.50 |

=== 2007-08-06: Itagüí — Salgar (130.4 km) ===
| Place | Stage 8 | | General Classification | |
| Place | Name | Time | Name | Time |
|---|---|---|---|---|
| 1. | John Parra (COL) | 03:16.39 | Santiago Botero (COL) | 34:48.56 |
| 2. | Fredy González (COL) | +1.21 | Mauricio Ortega (COL) | +1.09 |
| 3. | Rónald González (VEN) | +1.23 | Hernán Buenahora (COL) | +2.50 |

=== 2007-08-07: Salgar — Pereira (196.4 km) ===
| Place | Stage 9 | | General Classification | |
| Place | Name | Time | Name | Time |
|---|---|---|---|---|
| 1. | Alexander Giraldo (COL) | 04:52.50 | Santiago Botero (COL) | 39:54.15 |
| 2. | Norberto Wilches (COL) | +3.08 | Mauricio Ortega (COL) | +1.09 |
| 3. | César Salazar (VEN) | +3.08 | Hernán Buenahora (COL) | +2.50 |

=== 2007-08-08: Pereira — Cali (220.2 km) ===
| Place | Stage 10 | | General Classification | |
| Place | Name | Time | Name | Time |
|---|---|---|---|---|
| 1. | Juan Pablo Magallanes (MEX) | 04:29.26 | Santiago Botero (COL) | 44:25.10 |
| 2. | Juan Murillo (VEN) | — | Mauricio Ortega (COL) | +1.09 |
| 3. | Juan Alejandro Garcia (COL) | — | Hernán Buenahora (COL) | +2.50 |

=== 2007-08-09: Palmira — Calarcá (163.5 km) ===
| Place | Stage 11 | | General Classification | |
| Place | Name | Time | Name | Time |
|---|---|---|---|---|
| 1. | Fredy González (COL) | 03:46.40 | Santiago Botero (COL) | 48:17.13 |
| 2. | Rafael Montiel (COL) | +0.05 | Mauricio Ortega (COL) | +1.11 |
| 3. | César Salazar (VEN) | +0.09 | Hernán Buenahora (COL) | +2.52 |

=== 2007-08-10: Calarcá — Agua de Dios (179.5 km) ===
| Place | Stage 12 | | General Classification | |
| Place | Name | Time | Name | Time |
|---|---|---|---|---|
| 1. | Fabio Duarte (COL) | 04:24.26 | Santiago Botero (COL) | 52:41.33 |
| 2. | Santiago Botero (COL) | — | Hernán Buenahora (COL) | +3.00 |
| 3. | Juan Diego Ramírez (COL) | — | Israel Ochoa (COL) | +6.45 |

=== 2007-08-11: Melgar — Bogotá (122.9 km) ===
| Place | Stage 13 | | General Classification | |
| Place | Name | Time | Name | Time |
|---|---|---|---|---|
| 1. | Rafael Montiel (COL) | 04:24.26 | Santiago Botero (COL) | 56:24.19 |
| 2. | César Salazar (VEN) | +0.05 | Hernán Buenahora (COL) | +3.00 |
| 3. | Camilo Gómez (COL) | +0.24 | Israel Ochoa (COL) | +6.45 |

=== 2007-08-13: Bogotá — Bogotá (34.9 km) ===
| Place | Stage 14 (Individual Time Trial) | | General Classification | |
| Place | Name | Time | Name | Time |
|---|---|---|---|---|
| 1. | Santiago Botero (COL) | 00:39.00 | Santiago Botero (COL) | 57:03.19 |
| 2. | Israel Ochoa (COL) | +1.31 | Hernán Buenahora (COL) | +4.45 |
| 3. | Fabio Duarte (COL) | +1.39 | Israel Ochoa (COL) | +8.16 |

== Final classification ==
| RANK | NAME | TEAM | TIME |
|---|---|---|---|
| 1. | Santiago Botero (COL) | Une Orbitel | 57:03:19 |
| 2. | Hernán Buenahora (COL) | Lotería de Boyacá | + 4.45 |
| 3. | Israel Ochoa (COL) | Lotería de Boyacá | + 8.16 |
| 4. | José Castelblanco (COL) | Lotería de Boyacá | + 11.13 |
| 5. | Mauricio Ortega (COL) | GW-Shimano | + 15.45 |
| 6. | Libardo Niño (COL) | Coordinadora-EBSA | + 21.34 |
| 7. | Yeison Delgado (VEN) | Gob. Zulia-Cabimas | + 25.53 |
| 8. | Víctor Niño (COL) | Coordinadora-EBSA | + 26.42 |
| 9. | Alexis Castro (COL) | Colombia es Pasion | + 30.36 |
| 10. | Graciano Fonseca (COL) | Lotería de Boyacá | + 32.14 |

== Teams ==
Lotería de Boyacá — Indeportes

1. (Colombia) José Castelblanco
2. (Colombia) Hernán Buenahora
3. (Colombia) Israel Ochoa
4. (Colombia) Jairo Pérez
5. (Colombia) Urbelino Mesa
6. (Colombia) Ricardo Mesa
7. (Colombia) Santiago Ojeda
8. (Colombia) Graciano Fonseca
9. (Colombia) Giovanny Torres
10. (Colombia) Fabio Gordillo

Une Orbitel

11. (Colombia) Santiago Botero
12. (Colombia) Javier Alberto González
13. (Colombia) Juan Carlos Lopez
14. (Colombia) Giovanny Báez
15. (Colombia) Alejandro Ramírez
16. (Colombia) Giovanny Chacón
17. (Colombia) Oscar Álvarez
18. (Colombia) Freddy Piamonte
19. (Colombia) Edwin Orozco
20. (Colombia) Jhon Martínez

Coordinadora — EBSA ESP

21. (Colombia) Libardo Niño
22. (Colombia) Álvaro Sierra
23. (Colombia) Juan Diego Ramírez
24. (Colombia) Víctor Niño
25. (Colombia) Wilson Cepeda
26. (Colombia) Víctor Becerra

Coordinadora EMP Energia de Boyá

27. (Colombia) Alexander Giraldo
28. (Colombia) Camilo Gómez
29. (Colombia) Alejandro Serna
30. (Colombia) Víctor Hugo González

Gobernacíon de Zulia — Alcaldia Cabim

31. (Venezuela) Manuel Medina
32. (Venezuela) Paul Torres
33. (Venezuela) Nelson Gelvez
34. (Venezuela) Adelso Valero
35. (Venezuela) Yeison Delgado
36. (Venezuela) Wilmer Vasquez
37. (Venezuela) Nestor Barrera
38. (Venezuela) Raul Saavedra

Tecos de Mexico

41. (Colombia) Gregorio Ladino
42. (Mexico) Juan Pablo Magallanes
43. (Mexico) Fausto Esparza
44. (Mexico) Jesús Zárate
45. (Colombia) John Parra
46. (Mexico) Bernardo Colex
47. (Mexico) Francisco Matamoros
48. (Mexico) Epifanio Cortés
49. (Mexico) Héctor Rangel

Lotería del Táchira — Banfoandes

51. (Venezuela) José Chacón Díaz
52. (Venezuela) César Salazar
53. (Venezuela) Ronald González
54. (Venezuela) Juan Murillo
55. (Venezuela) Jackson Rodríguez
56. (Venezuela) Rodolfo Camacho
57. (Venezuela) Juan Rios
58. (Venezuela) Freddy Vargas
59. (Venezuela) Miguel Chacón

Colombia es Pasion — Coldeportes

61. (Colombia) Alexis Castro
62. (Colombia) Daniel Rincón
63. (Colombia) Edwin Parra
64. (Colombia) Fredy González
65. (Colombia) Jairo Hernández
66. (Colombia) Rafael Montiel
67. (Colombia) Wilson Zambrano
68. (Colombia) Jairo Salas
69. (Colombia) Andres Miguel Díaz
70. (Colombia) Robinson Chalapud

GW — Shimano

71. (Colombia) Mauricio Ortega
72. (Colombia) Francisco Colorado
73. (Colombia) Ricardo Giraldo
74. (Colombia) Argiro Zapata
75. (Colombia) Marvin Correa
76. (Colombia) Juan Alejandro García
77. (Colombia) Willam Muñoz
78. (Colombia) Stiver Ortíz
79. (Colombia) Wilmer Baena
80. (Colombia) Weimar Roldán

Gobernacíon de Boyacá — Alc Paipa

81. (Colombia) Fernando Camargo
82. (Colombia) Nestor Bernal
83. (Colombia) Robert Plazas
84. (Colombia) Orlando Acosta
85. (Colombia) Erney Casallas
86. (Colombia) Félix Castro
87. (Colombia) Juan Pablo Mesa
88. (Colombia) Luis Peña
89. (Colombia) Edgar Fonseca

Sabana Centro Catedral de Sal

91. (Colombia) Giovanny Barriga
92. (Colombia) Samuel Cabrera
93. (Colombia) Luis Alonso
94. (Colombia) Giovanny Balsero
95. (Colombia) Juan Carlos Torres
96. (Colombia) Juan Carlos Benavides
97. (Colombia) Óscar Pachón
98. (Colombia) Yerson Sánchez
99. (Colombia) Marcos Reyes

Frugos — Indervalle

101. (Colombia) Jhon García
102. (Colombia) Fabio Montenegro
103. (Colombia) Elder Herrera
104. (Colombia) Diego Calderón
105. (Colombia) Óscar Sanceno
106. (Colombia) Remberto Jaramillo
107. (Colombia) Jose Ibañez
108. (Colombia) Franklin López
109. (Colombia) Alvaro Montoya
110. (Colombia) Arlex Castro

Bogotá — IDRD

111. (Colombia) Fabio Duarte
112. (Colombia) Walter Pedraza
113. (Colombia) Duvan Agudelo
114. (Colombia) Armando Cardenas
115. (Colombia) Gerardo Rodríguez
116. (Colombia) Albeiro Sanchez
117. (Colombia) Aldo Valero
118. (Colombia) Gelvis Santamaria
119. (Colombia) Jesús Cruz
120. (Colombia) Aldemar Herrera

Postal Express — CMC Construccion

121. (Colombia) Camilo Castelblanco
122. (Colombia) Norberto Wilches
123. (Colombia) Jonathan Méndez
124. (Colombia) José Robles
125. (Colombia) Daniel Rodríguez
126. (Colombia) Miguel Cendales
127. (Colombia) Alfredo López
128. (Colombia) Juan Botero
129. (Colombia) Wilson Correa
130. (Colombia) Leonardo Mayorga

Studio TV — 9 Millonaria

131. (Colombia) Santos Álvarez
132. (Colombia) César Méndez
133. (Colombia) Emiro Matta
134. (Colombia) Henry Muñoz
135. (Colombia) Juan Carlos Castro
136. (Colombia) Héctor Rios

== See also ==
- 2007 Clásico RCN
