= 2005 Clásico RCN =

Race details
- Dates: October 2 – October 9
- Stages: 8
- Distance: 1,006.4 km (625.3 mi)
- Winning time: 27h 17' 40"

Results
	Winner	Libardo Niño (COL)	(Lotería de Boyacá)
	Second	Álvaro Sierra (COL)	(Orbitel)
	Third	Jairo Hernández (COL)	(Orbitel)
	Points	Jairo Salas (COL)	(Coordinadora Sabaneta)
	Mountains	Mauricio Neiza (COL)	(Orbitel)
	Youth	Camilo Gómez (COL)	(Envía-Indeportes)
	Combination	Libardo Niño (COL)	(Lotería de Boyacá)
	Team	Orbitel	

The 45th edition of the annual Clásico RCN was held from October 2 to October 9, 2005 in Colombia. The stage race started in Cúcuta and finished with an individual time trial in Manizales. RCN stands for "Radio Cadena Nacional" – one of the oldest and largest radio networks in the nation.

== Stages ==
=== 2005-10-02: Cúcuta – Cúcuta (120.4 km) ===
Place	Stage 1		General Classification	
Place	Name	Time	Name	Time
1.	Jairo Salas (COL)	02:04.32	Jairo Salas (COL)	02:04.21
2.	John Parra (COL)	—	John Parra (COL)	+0.04
3.	Jhon García (COL)	—	Jhon García (COL)	+0.05

=== 2005-10-03: Bucaramanga – El Socorro (121.8 km) ===
Place	Stage 2		General Classification	
Place	Name	Time	Name	Time
1.	Javier Zapata (COL)	03:14.32	Javier Zapata (COL)	05:18.54
2.	Libardo Niño (COL)	+0.07	Libardo Niño (COL)	+0.09
3.	Camilo Gómez (COL)	+0.10	Jhon García (COL)	+0.13

=== 2005-10-04: El Socorro – Tunja (162 km) ===
Place	Stage 3		General Classification	
Place	Name	Time	Name	Time
1.	Libardo Niño (COL)	04:47.28	Javier Zapata (COL)	10:06.16
2.	Javier Zapata (COL)	—	Libardo Niño (COL)	+0.05
3.	Edwin Parra (COL)	—	Jhon García (COL)	+0.19

=== 2005-10-05: Duitama ("Circuito Mundialista 1995") (142.4 km) ===
Place	Stage 4		General Classification	
Place	Name	Time	Name	Time
1.	Javier Zapata (COL)	03:53.47	Javier Zapata (COL)	13:59.53
2.	Libardo Niño (COL)	—	Libardo Niño (COL)	+0.09
3.	Mauricio Neiza (COL)	—	Mauricio Neiza (COL)	+0.32

=== 2005-10-06: Tunja – Bogotá (198.2 km) ===
Place	Stage 5		General Classification	
Place	Name	Time	Name	Time
1.	Graciano Fonseca (COL)	05:17.53	Libardo Niño (COL)	19:20.28
2.	Mauricio Soler (COL)	+2.37	Javier Zapata (COL)	+0.23
3.	Libardo Niño (COL)	—	Mauricio Soler (COL)	+0.25

=== 2005-10-07: Soacha – Ibagué (190 km) ===
Place	Stage 6		General Classification	
Place	Name	Time	Name	Time
1.	Alejandro Ramírez (COL)	04:21.06	Libardo Niño (COL)	23:44.32
2.	John Parra (COL)	—	Javier Zapata (COL)	+0.19
3.	Javier Zapata (COL)	+2.39	Mauricio Soler (COL)	+0.25

=== 2005-10-08: Ibagué – Armenia (105.2 km) ===
Place	Stage 7		General Classification	
Place	Name	Time	Name	Time
1.	Jairo Hernández (COL)	02:45.52	Libardo Niño (COL)	26:10.03
2.	Libardo Niño (COL)	+0.05	Álvaro Sierra (COL)	+0.35
3.	Álvaro Sierra (COL)	+0.05	Jairo Hernández (COL)	+1.04

=== 2005-10-09: Chinchiná – Manizales (26.4 km) ===
Place	Stage 8 (Individual Time Trial)		General Classification	
Place	Name	Time	Name	Time
1.	Libardo Niño (COL)	00:47.37	Libardo Niño (COL)	27:17.40
2.	Edwin Orozco (COL)	+0.34	Álvaro Sierra (COL)	+1.49
3.	Álvaro Sierra (COL)	+1.14	Jairo Hernández (COL)	+3.03

== Final classification ==
RANK	NAME	TEAM	TIME
1.	Libardo Niño (COL)	Lotería de Boyacá	27:17:40
2.	Álvaro Sierra (COL)	Orbitel	+ 1.49
3.	Jairo Hernández (COL)	Orbitel	+ 3.03
4.	Javier Zapata (COL)	Orbitel	+ 3.30
5.	Edwin Orozco (COL)	Aguardiente Antioqueño	+ 4.00
6.	Víctor Niño (COL)	Lotería de Boyacá	+ 4.33
7.	Mauricio Neiza (COL)	Orbitel	+ 6.05
8.	Heberth Gutiérrez (COL)	Orbitel	+ 7.54
9.	Juan Diego Ramírez (COL)	Aguardiente Antioqueño	+ 7.55
10.	Camilo Gómez (COL)	Indeportes Paipa	+ 11.03

== Teams ==
05 Orbitel

1. (Colombia) Álvaro Sierra
2. (Colombia) Mauricio Soler
3. (Colombia) Mauricio Neiza
4. (Colombia) Hernán Darío Muñoz
5. (Colombia) Javier Zapata
6. (Colombia) Jairo Hernández
7. (Colombia) Heberth Gutiérrez
8. (Colombia) Walter Pedraza
9. (Colombia) Jhon García

Lotería de Boyacá-Coordinadora

11. (Colombia) Libardo Niño
12. (Colombia) Israel Ochoa
13. (Colombia) Elder Herrera
14. (Colombia) Víctor Niño
15. (Colombia) Víctor Becerra
16. (Colombia) Ricardo Mesa
17. (Colombia) Graciano Fonseca
18. (Colombia) Miguel Ángel Sanabria
19. (Colombia) Jairo Pérez

Aguardiente Antioqueño-Lotería de Medellín

21. (Colombia) Alexis Castro
22. (Colombia) Alexánder Giraldo
23. (Colombia) Alejandro Ramírez
24. (Colombia) Juan Diego Ramírez
25. (Colombia) Héctor Mesa
26. (Colombia) Óscar Álvarez
27. (Colombia) John Velásquez
28. (Colombia) Edwin Orozco
29. (Colombia) Julián Atehortúa

Postal Express

31. (Colombia) Johan Rodríguez
32. (Colombia) Juan Pablo Forero
33. (Colombia) Edwin Sánchez
34. (Colombia) Óscar Marentes
35. (Colombia) Freddy Guerrero
36. (Colombia) Fabián Rincón
37. (Colombia) Gerson Sánchez
38. (Colombia) Dayro Rodríguez
39. (Colombia) Jesús Andrés Cruz

Coordinadora - Monarca - Sabaneta

41. (Colombia) Jairo Salas
42. (Colombia) Marvin Correa
43. (Colombia) Juan Alejandro García
44. (Colombia) William Muñoz
45. (Colombia) Carlos Pulgarín
46. (Colombia) Wilmer Baena
47. (Colombia) Vladimir Zapata
48. (Colombia) Edwin Ortíz

Envía-Indeportes Boyacá

51. (Colombia) Edwin Parra
52. (Colombia) Camilo Gómez
53. (Colombia) Edilberto Martínez
54. (Colombia) Jefferson Vargas
55. (Colombia) Fernando Camargo
56. (Colombia) Giovanny Torres
57. (Colombia) Jorge Orlando Acosta
58. (Colombia) Fabio Mahecha
59. (Colombia) Santiago Ojeda

Frugos de Cali

61. (Colombia) Giovanny Barriga
62. (Colombia) Fabio Montenegro
63. (Colombia) Remberto Jaramillo
64. (Colombia) Norberto Wilches
65. (Colombia) Franklin López
66. (Colombia) Harvey Hernández
67. (Colombia) Juan Botero
68. (Colombia) Miguel Ángel Díaz
69. (Colombia) Dubán Agudelo

Gobernación de Norte de Santander-Bono del Ciclismo

71. (Colombia) Pedro Trujillo
72. (Colombia) Edison Paredes
73. (Colombia) Erwin Méndez
74. (Colombia) Juan Pablo Wilches
75. (Colombia) Alexander Rojas
76. (Colombia) Luis Fernando Cala
77. (Colombia) Wilson Zambrano
78. (Colombia) Luis Ernesto Duqué

Club Cicloases Cundinamarca

81. (Colombia) Jaider Lara
82. (Colombia) Luis Alberto Alonso
83. (Colombia) Rolando Pompeyo
84. (Colombia) Julián Jiménez
85. (Colombia) Humberto Delgado
86. (Colombia) Óscar Bolívar
87. (Colombia) César Méndez

Frutidelicias Frugos

91. (Colombia) Carlos Albarracín
92. (Colombia) Leonel Bonilla
93. (Colombia) Ricadel Orozco
94. (Colombia) John Zair Cedano

Mixto 1

101. (Colombia) Santo Álvarez
102. (Colombia) Héctor Ríos
103. (Colombia) Juan Camilo Rivera
104. (Colombia) John Parra
105. (Colombia) Diego Calderón
106. (Colombia) Edgar Restrepo

Mixto 2

111. (Colombia) Félix Cárdenas
112. (Colombia) Edgar Fonseca
113. (Colombia) Aldo Valero
114. (Colombia) Jorge Humberto Martínez
115. (Colombia) Alejandro Cortés
116. (Colombia) Óscar Henao
117. (Colombia) Auli Sánchez

Mixto 3

121. (Colombia) Darwin González
122. (Colombia) Héctor Hernández
123. (Colombia) Armando Cárdenas
124. (Colombia) Wilmer Martínez
125. (Colombia) Diego Castro
126. (Colombia) Juan Carlos Castro
127. (Colombia) Jorge Forero
128. (Colombia) Francisco Javier Gómez

Coordinadora-Lotería de Boyacá

131. (Colombia) Néstor Bernal
132. (Colombia) Iván Casas
133. (Colombia) Fredy Piamonte
134. (Colombia) Freddy Montaña
135. (Belgium) Stijn Dedecker

== See also ==
- 2005 Vuelta a Colombia
