= 2004 Vuelta a Colombia =

Race details
- Dates: June 6–20, 2004
- Stages: 14
- Distance: 1,945.7 km (1,209.0 mi)
- Winning time: 50h 25' 15"

Results
	Winner	~~José Castelblanco~~ Libardo Niño (COL)	(Lotería de Boyacá)
	Second	Jairo Hernández (COL)	(Orbitel)
	Third	Heberth Gutiérrez (COL)	(Orbitel)
	Points	Libardo Niño (COL)	(Loteria de Boyaca)
	Mountains	~~José Castelblanco~~ Victor Niño (COL)	(Lotería de Boyacá)
	Youth	Walter Pedraza (COL)	(Orbitel)
	Sprints	Ferney Bello (COL)	(Alcaldía de Fusagasugá)
	Team	Orbitel	

The 54th edition of the Vuelta a Colombia was held from June 6 to June 20, 2004.

== Stages ==
=== 2004-06-06: San Juan de Pasto — San Juan de Pasto (5.6 km) ===
Place	Prologue		General Classification	
Place	Name	Time	Name	Time
1.	Libardo Niño (COL)	00:09.48	Libardo Niño (COL)	00:09.48
2.	José Castelblanco (COL)	+0.03	José Castelblanco (COL)	+0.03
3.	Elder Herrera (COL)	+0.05	Elder Herrera (COL)	+0.05

=== 2004-06-07: San Juan de Pasto — San Juan de Pasto (172.3 km) ===
Place	Stage 1		General Classification	
Place	Name	Time	Name	Time
1.	Mauricio Neiza (COL)	05:02.40	Mauricio Neiza (COL)	05:12.29
2.	Jhon García (COL)	+0.12	Libardo Niño (COL)	+0.07
3.	Libardo Niño (COL)	—	José Castelblanco (COL)	+0.15

=== 2004-06-08: La Florida — Remolinos (108 km) ===
Place	Stage 2		General Classification	
Place	Name	Time	Name	Time
1.	Ismael Sarmiento (COL)	02:36.43	Mauricio Neiza (COL)	07:49.18
2.	Jairo Hernández (COL)	—	Libardo Niño (COL)	+0.07
3.	Heberth Gutiérrez (COL)	+0.01	Jairo Hernández (COL)	+0.07

=== 2004-06-09: Popayán — Palmira (149 km) ===
Place	Stage 3		General Classification	
Place	Name	Time	Name	Time
1.	Leonardo Duque (COL)	03:20.24	Mauricio Neiza (COL)	11:09.42
2.	Javier Zapata (COL)	—	Libardo Niño (COL)	+0.07
3.	Elder Herrera (COL)	—	Jairo Hernández (COL)	+0.07

=== 2004-06-10: Palmira — Santa Rosa de Cabal (197.6 km) ===
Place	Stage 4		General Classification	
Place	Name	Time	Name	Time
1.	Libardo Niño (COL)	04:54.23	Libardo Niño (COL)	16:04.02
2.	Leonardo Duque (COL)	—	Mauricio Neiza (COL)	+0.05
3.	Elder Herrera (COL)	+0.02	Jairo Hernández (COL)	+0.12

=== 2004-06-11: Santa Rosa de Cabal — Jericó (171 km) ===
Place	Stage 5		General Classification	
Place	Name	Time	Name	Time
1.	José Castelblanco (COL)	04:30.39	José Castelblanco (COL)	20:53.22
2.	Juan Diego Ramírez (COL)	+0.28	Jairo Hernández (COL)	+0.19
3.	Alejandro Ramírez (COL)	+0.33	Juan Diego Ramírez (COL)	+0.21

=== 2004-06-12: Jericó — La Estrella (116.4 km) ===
Place	Stage 6		General Classification	
Place	Name	Time	Name	Time
1.	Héctor Mesa (COL)	03:16.11	José Castelblanco (COL)	23:52.45
2.	Libardo Niño (COL)	+1.09	Jairo Hernández (COL)	+0.14
3.	Jairo Hernández (COL)	+1.11	Libardo Niño (COL)	+0.16

=== 2004-06-13: Medellín — Medellín (119 km) ===
Place	Stage 7		General Classification	
Place	Name	Time	Name	Time
1.	Edward Ruiz (COL)	02:58.55	José Castelblanco (COL)	26:56.04
2.	Ferney Bello (COL)	+4.24	Jairo Hernández (COL)	+0.14
3.	Deivy Ibáñez (COL)	—	Libardo Niño (COL)	+0.15

=== 2004-06-14: La Estrella — Jardín (151.4 km) ===
Place	Stage 8		General Classification	
Place	Name	Time	Name	Time
1.	Jairo Hernández (COL)	03:52.16	José Castelblanco (COL)	30:48.19
2.	Libardo Niño (COL)	—	Jairo Hernández (COL)	+0.05
3.	José Castelblanco (COL)	+0.03	Libardo Niño (COL)	+0.10

=== 2004-06-15: Jardín — Anserma (203.7 km) ===
Place	Stage 9		General Classification	
Place	Name	Time	Name	Time
1.	Jairo Hernández (COL)	05:16.52	Jairo Hernández (COL)	36:05.06
2.	Libardo Niño (COL)	—	José Castelblanco (COL)	+0.01
3.	José Castelblanco (COL)	—	Libardo Niño (COL)	+0.09

=== 2004-06-16: Anserma — La Tebaida (140.4 km) ===
Place	Stage 10		General Classification	
Place	Name	Time	Name	Time
1.	Jhon García (COL)	03:21.32	Jairo Hernández (COL)	39:30.21
2.	Javier Zapata (COL)	—	José Castelblanco (COL)	+0.01
3.	Héctor Mesa (COL)	+0.01	Libardo Niño (COL)	+0.07

=== 2004-06-17: La Tebaida — Girardot (176.4 km) ===
Place	Stage 11		General Classification	
Place	Name	Time	Name	Time
1.	Jhon García (COL)	04:45.02	Jairo Hernández (COL)	44:15.23
2.	Elder Herrera (COL)	—	José Castelblanco (COL)	+0.01
3.	Heberth Gutiérrez (COL)	+0.01	Libardo Niño (COL)	+0.07

=== 2004-06-18: Girardot — Funza (122.3 km) ===
Place	Stage 12		General Classification	
Place	Name	Time	Name	Time
1.	Heberth Gutiérrez (COL)	03:32.51	Jairo Hernández (COL)	47:48.10
2.	Libardo Niño (COL)	—	José Castelblanco (COL)	+0.05
3.	Jairo Hernández (COL)	—	Libardo Niño (COL)	+0.05

=== 2004-06-19: Bogotá — Alto de la Ye (21.9 km) ===
Place	Stage 13 (Individual Time Trial)		General Classification	
Place	Name	Time	Name	Time
1.	José Castelblanco (COL)	00:34.13	José Castelblanco (COL)	48:22.28
2.	Libardo Niño (COL)	+1.14	Libardo Niño (COL)	+1.14
3.	Walter Pedraza (COL)	+1.36	Jairo Hernández (COL)	+1.32

=== 2004-06-20: Circuito en Bogotá (Sector de Ciudad Kennedy) (90 km) ===
Place	Stage 14		General Classification	
Place	Name	Time	Name	Time
1.	Miguel Ángel Sanabria (COL)	01:58.08	José Castelblanco (COL)	50:25.15
2.	Jesús Albeiro Sánchez (COL)	—	Libardo Niño (COL)	+1.14
3.	Alexis Rojas (COL)	—	Jairo Hernández (COL)	+1.32

== Final classification ==
RANK	NAME	TEAM	TIME
1.	José Castelblanco (COL)	Orbitel	50:25:15
2.	Libardo Niño (COL)	Lotería de Boyacá	+ 1.14
3.	Jairo Hernández (COL)	Orbitel	+ 1.32
4.	Heberth Gutiérrez (COL)	Orbitel	+ 3.27
5.	Ricardo Mesa (COL)	Lotería de Boyacá	+ 3.50
6.	Víctor Niño (COL)	Lotería de Boyacá	+ 7.48
7.	Francisco Colorado (COL)	Aguardiente Antioqueño	+ 7.48
8.	Elder Herrera (COL)	Aguardiente Antioqueño	+ 8.53
9.	Jairo Pérez (COL)	Lotería de Boyacá	+ 9.18
10.	Walter Pedraza (COL)	Orbitel	+ 13.11

== Teams ==
Lotería de Boyacá

1. (Colombia) Libardo Niño
2. (Colombia) Israel Ochoa
3. (Colombia) Víctor Niño
4. (Colombia) Jairo Pérez
5. (Colombia) Ricardo Mesa
6. (Colombia) Víctor Becerra
7. (Colombia) Ismael Sarmiento
8. (Colombia) Miguel Ángel Sanabria
9. (Colombia) Néstor Bernal
10. (Colombia) Graciano Fonseca

05 Orbitel

11. (Colombia) José Castelblanco
12. (Colombia) Hernán Darío Muñoz
13. (Colombia) Hernán Darío Bonilla
14. (Colombia) Jorge Humberto Martínez
15. (Colombia) Javier Zapata
16. (Colombia) Heberth Gutiérrez
17. (Colombia) Jairo Hernández
18. (Colombia) Alejandro Cortés
19. (Colombia) Giovanny Chacón
20. (Colombia) Jhon García

Aguardiente Antioqueño — Lotería de Medellín

21. (Colombia) Juan Diego Ramírez
22. (Colombia) Elder Herrera
23. (Colombia) Leonardo Duque
24. (Colombia) Francisco Colorado
25. (Colombia) Alejandro Ramírez
26. (Colombia) Héctor Mesa
27. (Colombia) Urbelino Mesa
28. (Colombia) Alexis Rojas
29. (Colombia) John Parra
30. (Colombia) Julio César Rangel

Gobernación de Nariño

31. (Colombia) Jorge Aguirre
32. (Colombia) Jairo Valenzuela
33. (Colombia) Héctor Valenzuela
34. (Colombia) Armando Estacio
35. (Colombia) Walter Barco
36. (Colombia) Jesús Rojas
37. (Colombia) Germán Canchala

Alcaldía de Fusagasugá — Juegos Nacionales

41. (Colombia) Víctor Hugo González
42. (Colombia) Rigoberto Ibáñez
43. (Colombia) José Luis Vanegas
44. (Colombia) Jhonny Ruiz
45. (Colombia) Raúl Gómez
46. (Colombia) Ferney Bello
47. (Colombia) Juan Fonseca
48. (Colombia) Deivy Ibáñez
49. (Colombia) Juan Barrero
50. (Colombia) Alexánder Roa

Cicloacosta — Bello Instituto de Cancerología

51. (Colombia) Oved Ramírez
52. (Colombia) Alexis Castro
53. (Colombia) Stiven Ortiz
54. (Colombia) Nelson Vargas
55. (Colombia) Édgar Restrepo
56. (Colombia) Wílmar Baena
57. (Colombia) Álvaro Montoya
58. (Colombia) Alejandro Botero
59. (Colombia) Pedro Zapata
60. (Colombia) Gabriel Castaño

Gobernación — Coldeportes — Lotería de Boyacá

61. (Colombia) Mauricio Neiza
62. (Colombia) José Ibáñez
63. (Colombia) Giovanni Torres
64. (Colombia) Iván Casas
65. (Colombia) Carlos Blanco
66. (Colombia) Félix Castro
67. (Colombia) Jorge Orlando Acosta
68. (Colombia) Víctor Benítez

Mixto Uno

71. (Colombia) Olmedo Capacho
72. (Colombia) Walter Pedraza
73. (Colombia) Mauricio Henao
74. (Colombia) Oscar Álvarez
75. (Colombia) Gerardo Ramírez
76. (Colombia) Wálter Guerra
77. (Colombia) Giovanni Barriga
78. (Colombia) Luis Gil
79. (Colombia) Orlando Acosta

Cicloases provincia de Cundinamarca

81. (Colombia) Jimmy Martínez
82. (Colombia) Humberto Delgado
83. (Colombia) Gerardo Rodríguez
84. (Colombia) Rafael Montiel
85. (Colombia) Carlos Albarracín
86. (Colombia) Óscar Bolívar
87. (Colombia) Gerson Sánchez
88. (Colombia) Luis Alberto Gil

Mixto Dos

91. (Colombia) Oscar Álvarez
92. (Colombia) Gerardo Ramírez
93. (Colombia) Jorge Orlando Acosta
94. (Colombia) Walter Enrique Guerra
95. (Colombia) Santo Álvarez
96. (Colombia) Ferney Naranjo
97. (Colombia) Arlex Tabares
98. (Colombia) Jesús Albeiro Sánchez
99. (Colombia) Mardoqueo Arteaga

== See also ==
- 2004 Clásico RCN
