= Cycling at the 2003 Pan American Games – Mountain Bike =

The Mountainbike Competition at the 2003 Pan American Games in Santo Domingo, Dominican Republic was held on 10 August 2003.

== Results ==
=== Men's Cross Country ===
Rank	Name	Time
1	Jeremiah Bishop (USA)	2:10.39
2	Edvandro Cruz (BRA)	+ 0.14
3	Deiber Esquivel (CRC)	+ 1.49
4	Marcio Ravelli (BRA)	+ 6.04
5	Fabio Castañeda (COL)	+ 1 lap
6	Yamil Carlos Montaño (BOL)	+ 1 lap
7	Edvin Barrios (GUA)	+ 1 lap
8	Ismael Sánchez (DOM)	+ 1 lap
9	Carlos Gennero (ARG)	+ 1 lap
–	Héctor Paez (COL)	DNF
–	José Adrián Bonilla (CRC)	DNF
–	Jeremy Horgan (USA)	DNF
–	Ziranda Madrigal (MEX)	DNF
–	Ramón Moronta (DOM)	DNF
–	Mathieu Toulouse (CAN)	DNF

=== Women's Cross Country ===
Rank	Name	Time
1	Jimena Florit (ARG)	2:02.59
2	Mary McConneloug (USA)	+ 2.50
3	Francisca Campos (CHI)	+ 7.56
4	Laura Morfín (MEX)	+ 9.15
5	Jacqueline Mourao (BRA)	+ 1 lap
6	Karen Matamoros (CRC)	+ 1 lap
7	Flor Delgadillo (COL)	+ 1 lap
8	María Ramírez (ECU)	+ 1 lap
9	Anabella López (GUA)	+ 1 lap
10	Diana Marggraff (ECU)	+ 1 lap

== See also ==
- Cycling at the 2004 Summer Olympics – Men's cross-country
- Cycling at the 2004 Summer Olympics – Women's cross-country
