= Cycling at the 2007 Pan American Games =

There were four cycling events at the 2007 Pan American Games: road cycling, track cycling, mountain bike and BMX racing.

== Road cycling ==
=== Men's events ===
Event	Gold	Silver	Bronze
Individual Road Race	Wendy Cruz (DOM)	Emile Abraham (TRI)	Luciano Pagliarini (BRA)
Individual Time Trial	Santiago Botero (COL)	Matías Médici (ARG)	Dominique Rollin (CAN)

=== Women's events ===
Event	Gold	Silver	Bronze
Individual Road Race	Yumari González (CUB)	Belem Guerrero (MEX)	Danielys García (VEN)
Individual Time Trial	Anne Samplonius (CAN)	Giuseppina Grassi (MEX)	Clemilda Fernandes (BRA)

== Track cycling ==
=== Men's events ===
Event	Gold	Silver	Bronze
Sprint	Julio César Herrera (CUB)	Ben Barczewski (USA)	Andy Lakatosh (USA)
Team Sprint	Cuba; Ahmed López; Julio César Herrera; Yosmani Poll	Venezuela; Hersony Canelón; Andris Hernández; César Marcano	Colombia; Leonardo Narváez; Hernán Sánchez; Marzuki Mejia
Individual Pursuit	Enzo Cesario (CHI)	Tomás Gil (VEN)	Fernando Antogna (ARG)
Team Pursuit	Chile; Enzo Cesario; Marco Arriagada; Luis Sepúlveda; Gonzalo Miranda	Colombia; Carlos Alzate; Juan Pablo Forero; Arles Castro; Jairo Pérez	Venezuela; Tomás Gil; Richard Ochoa; Jaime Rivas; Franklin Chacón
Madison	Argentina; Walter Pérez; Juan Curuchet	Colombia; Alexander González; José Serpa	Venezuela; Richard Ochoa; Andris Hernández
Keirin	Leonardo Narváez (COL)	Cam Mackinnon (CAN)	Leandro Bottasso (ARG)
Points Race	Andris Hernández (VEN)	José Serpa (COL)	Milton Wynants (URU)

=== Women's events ===
Event	Gold	Silver	Bronze
Sprint	Diana García (COL)	Lisandra Guerra (CUB)	Arianna Herrera (CUB)
Individual Pursuit	María Luisa Calle (COL)	Danielys García (VEN)	Dalila Rodríguez (CUB)
Points Race	Yoanka González (CUB)	María Luisa Calle (COL)	Belem Guerrero (MEX)

== Mountain bike ==
Event	Gold	Silver	Bronze
Men	Adam Craig (USA)	Rubens Donizete (BRA)	Dario Alejandro Gasco (ARG)
Women	Catharine Pendrel (CAN)	Mary McConneloug (USA)	Lorenza Morfín (MEX)

== BMX ==
Event	Gold	Silver	Bronze
Men	Jason Richardson (USA)	Jonathan Suárez (VEN)	José Primera (VEN)
Women	Gabriela Díaz (ARG)	Ana Flávia Sgobin (BRA)	Kimmy Diquez (VEN)

== Medal table ==
Rank	Nation	Gold	Silver	Bronze	Total
1	Colombia	4	4	1	9
2	Cuba	4	1	2	7
3	United States	2	2	1	5
4	Argentina	2	1	3	6
5	Canada	2	1	1	4
6	Chile	2	0	0	2
7	Venezuela	1	4	5	10
8	Dominican Republic	1	0	0	1
9	Brazil	0	2	2	4
9	Mexico	0	2	2	4
11	Trinidad and Tobago	0	1	0	1
12	Uruguay	0	0	1	1
Totals (12 entries)		18	18	18	54

== See also ==
- 2007 in track cycling
