= Cycling at the 2003 Pan American Games =

There were three cycling events at the 2003 Pan American Games: road cycling, track cycling and mountain bike. The competition started on August 10, 2003 with the Mountain Bike competition (men and women), and ended on August 17, 2003 with the Men's Road Race.

== Road Cycling ==
=== Men's Events ===
Event	Gold	Silver	Bronze
Individual Road Race; Details	Milton Wynants (URU)	Pedro Pablo Pérez (CUB)	José Medina (CHI)
Individual Time Trial; Details	José Serpa (COL)	Chris Baldwin (USA)	Franklin Chacón (VEN)

=== Women's Events ===
Event	Gold	Silver	Bronze
Individual Road Race; Details	Yoanka González (CUB)	Janildes Fernandes (BRA)	Yeilin Fernández (CUB)
Individual Time Trial; Details	Kimberly Bruckner (USA)	Clara Hughes (CAN)	Kristin Armstrong (USA)

== Track Cycling ==
=== Men's Events ===
Event	Gold	Silver	Bronze
Sprint; Details	Leonardo Narváez (COL) Barry Forde, the initial winner, was disqualified for a doping violation.	Giddeon Massie (USA)	
Team Sprint; Details	Cuba; Ahmed López; Reinier Cartaya; Yosmani Poll	Colombia; Rodrigo Barros; Jonathan Marín; Leonardo Narváez	Venezuela; Alexander Cornieles; Rubén Osorio; Jhonny Hernández
Individual Pursuit; Details	Edgardo Simón (ARG)	Marco Arriagada (CHI)	Alexander González (COL)
Team Pursuit; Details	Chile; Enzo Cesario; Marco Arriagada; Luis Sepúlveda; Antonio Cabrera	Argentina; Ángel Colla; Guillermo Brunetta; Walter Pérez; Edgardo Simón	Colombia; Alexander González; José Serpa; Arles Castro; Juan Pablo Forero
Time Trial; Details	Ahmed López (CUB)	Christian Stahl (USA)	Benjamín Martínez (BOL)
Keirin; Details	Giddeon Massie (USA) Barry Forde, the initial winner, was disqualified for a doping violation.	Rubén Osorio (VEN)	
Madison; Details	Argentina; Walter Pérez; Juan Curuchet	Colombia; Alexander González; Leonardo Duque	United States; Colby Pearce; James Carney
Points Race; Details	Milton Wynants (URU)	Marco Arriagada (CHI)	Leonardo Duque (COL)

=== Women's Events ===
Event	Gold	Silver	Bronze
Sprint; Details	Tanya Lindenmuth (USA)	Daniela Larreal (VEN)	Chris Witty (USA)
Individual Pursuit; Details	María Luisa Calle (COL)	Yoanka González (CUB)	Clara Hughes (CAN)
Keirin; Details	Tanya Lindenmuth (USA)	Daniela Larreal (VEN)	Yumari González (CUB)
Points Race; Details	Clara Hughes (CAN)	María Molina de Ortíz (GUA)	Yoanka González (CUB)
500m time trial Details	Nancy Contreras (MEX)	Chris Witty (USA)	Yumari González (CUB)

== Mountain Bike ==
Event	Gold	Silver	Bronze
Men's Race; Details	Jeremiah Bishop (USA)	Edvandro Cruz (BRA)	Deiber Esquivel (CRC)
Women's Race; Details	Jimena Florit (ARG)	Mary McConneloug (USA)	Francisca Campos (CHI)

== Medals table ==
Place	Nation	Gold medal	Silver medal	Bronze medal	Total
1.	United States	5	5	3	13
2.	Cuba	3	2	4	9
3.	Colombia	3	2	3	8
4.	Argentina	3	1	0	4
5.	Uruguay	2	0	0	2
6.	Chile	1	2	2	5
7.	Canada	1	1	1	3
8.	Mexico	1	0	0	1
9.	Venezuela	0	3	2	5
10.	Brazil	0	2	0	2
11.	Guatemala	0	1	0	1
12.	Bolivia	0	0	1	1
12.	Costa Rica	0	0	1	1
Total		19	19	17	55
