= 1999 Clásico RCN =

Race details
- Dates: August 13 – August 22
- Stages: 9
- Distance: 1,335 km (830 mi)
- Winning time: 34h 39' 43"

Results
	Winner	Jairo Hernández (COL)	(05 Orbitel)
	Second	Álvaro Sierra (COL)	(Aguardiente Néctar)
	Third	Juan Diego Ramírez (COL)	(05 Orbitel)
	Points	Heberth Gutiérrez (COL)	(Aguardiente Cristal-Chec)
	Mountains	Álvaro Sierra (COL)	(Aguardiente Néctar)
	Combination	Jairo Hernández (COL)	(05 Orbitel)
	Team	(Colombia) 05 Orbitel	

The 39th edition of the annual Clásico RCN was held from August 13 to August 22, 1999, in Colombia. The stage race with an UCI rate of 2.4 started in Villa de Leyva and finished in Medellín.

== Stages ==
=== 1999-08-13: Villa de Leyva (3.6 km) ===
Place	Prologue		General Classification	
Place	Name	Time	Name	Time
1.	Marlon Pérez (COL)	00:04.34	Marlon Pérez (COL)	00:04.34
2.	Hernán Bonilla (COL)	+0.06	Hernán Bonilla (COL)	+0.06
3.	Jairo Hernández (COL)	+0.08	Jairo Hernández (COL)	+0.08

=== 1999-08-14: Villa de Leyva — Barbosa (158 km) ===
Place	Stage 1		General Classification	
Place	Name	Time	Name	Time
1.	Javier Zapata (COL)	03:45.24	Javier Zapata (COL)	03:49.58
2.	Ruber Marín (COL)	—	Marlon Pérez (COL)	—
3.	Juan Diego Ramírez (COL)	—	Hernán Bonilla (COL)	+0.06

=== 1999-08-15: Moniquirá — Tocancipá (160 km) ===
Place	Stage 2		General Classification	
Place	Name	Time	Name	Time
1.	Jairo Pérez (COL)	04:38.20	Marlon Pérez (COL)	08:28.16
2.	Raúl Montaña (COL)	+0.06	Javier Zapata (COL)	+0.04
3.	Marlon Pérez (COL)	—	Jairo Pérez (COL)	+0.07

=== 1999-08-16: Bogotá — Alto de Patios (22.6 km) ===
Place	Stage 3 (Individual Time Trial)		General Classification	
Place	Name	Time	Name	Time
1.	Álvaro Sierra (COL)	00:44.14	Juan Diego Ramírez (COL)	09:12.48
2.	Juan Diego Ramírez (COL)	+0.10	Jairo Hernández (COL)	+0.01
3.	Jairo Hernández (COL)	+0.11	Álvaro Sierra (COL)	+0.05

=== 1999-08-17: Madrid — Ibagué (196 km) ===
Place	Stage 4		General Classification	
Place	Name	Time	Name	Time
1.	Tomás García (ESP)	04:40.31	Tomás García (ESP)	13:56.21
2.	Álvaro Lozano (COL)	+1.23	Álvaro Lozano (COL)	+1.46
3.	Nélson Vargas (COL)	+1.50	Juan Diego Ramírez (COL)	+3.50

=== 1999-08-18: Ibagué — Roldanillo (152 km) ===
Place	Stage 5		General Classification	
Place	Name	Time	Name	Time
1.	Jairo Hernández (COL)	04:15.16	Tomás García (ESP)	18:15.58
2.	Jairo Pérez (COL)	—	Jairo Hernández (COL)	+0.07
3.	Alexis Rojas (COL)	—	Juan Diego Ramírez (COL)	+0.12

=== 1999-08-19: Roldanillo — Armenia (127 km) ===
Place	Stage 6		General Classification	
Place	Name	Time	Name	Time
1.	Jairo Hernández (COL)	03:13.34	Jairo Hernández (COL)	21:29.09
2.	Víctor Hugo Peña (COL)	—	Tomás García (ESP)	+0.10
3.	Ruber Marín (COL)	—	Juan Diego Ramírez (COL)	+0.22

=== 1999-08-20: Pereira — Manizales (210 km) ===
Place	Stage 7		General Classification	
Place	Name	Time	Name	Time
1.	Jairo Hernández (COL)	05:37.13	Jairo Hernández (COL)	27:07.22
2.	Álvaro Sierra (COL)	+0.01	Álvaro Sierra (COL)	+0.30
3.	Juan Diego Ramírez (COL)	+0.14	Juan Diego Ramírez (COL)	+0.42

=== 1999-08-21: Manizales — Medellín (185.8 km) ===
Place	Stage 8		General Classification	
Place	Name	Time	Name	Time
1.	Hernán Buenahora (COL)	04:44.45	Jairo Hernández (COL)	31:54.03
2.	Ubaldo Mesa (COL)	+1.51	Álvaro Sierra (COL)	+0.30
3.	Víctor Hugo Peña (COL)	—	Juan Diego Ramírez (COL)	+0.42

=== 1999-08-22: Medellín Circuit Race (120 km) ===
Place	Stage 9		General Classification	
Place	Name	Time	Name	Time
1.	Marlon Pérez (COL)	02:45.40	Jairo Hernández (COL)	34:39.43
2.	Fredy González (COL)	—	Álvaro Sierra (COL)	+0.30
3.	Ruber Marín (COL)	—	Juan Diego Ramírez (COL)	+0.42

== Final classification ==
RANK	NAME	TEAM	TIME
1.	Jairo Hernández (COL)	05 Orbitel	34:39:43
2.	Álvaro Sierra (COL)	Aguardiente Néctar	+ 0.30
3.	Juan Diego Ramírez (COL)	05 Orbitel	+ 0.42
4.	Tomás García (ESP)	Seguros Vitalicio	+ 1.52
5.	Héctor Castaño (COL)	05 Orbitel	+ 3.28
6.	Argiro Zapata (COL)	Empresas Públicas de Medellín	+ 4.11
7.	Miguel Ángel Sanabria (COL)	05 Orbitel	+ 4.40
8.	Julio César Rangel (COL)	Aguardiente Cristal-Chec	+ 4.57
9.	Jairo Pérez (COL)	Lotería de Boyacá	+ 5.44
10.	Héctor Palacio (COL)	05 Orbitel	+ 5.55

== See also ==
- 1999 Vuelta a Colombia
