= Andris Hernández =

Venezuelan cyclist (born 1982)

Personal information
- Full name: Andris José Hernández Gimenez
- Born: 11 January 1982 (age 44) Barinas, Barinas, Venezuela

Cycling career
- Sport: Cycling
- Discipline: Road
- Role: Rider

Amateur teams
- 2006–2009: Gobernación Bolivariano Carabobo
- 2011: Alcaldía Bolivariana de Valencia
- 2014: Fundarujano–Alcaldía de Tovar
- 2014–2015: Gobernación de Mérida–PDVSA
- 2016: Gobernación Trujillo–Policía–Emcontru
Medal record
Men's Track Cycling
Representing Venezuela
Pan American Games
Gold medal – first place	2007 Rio de Janeiro	Points Race
Silver medal – second place	2007 Rio de Janeiro	Team Sprint
Bronze medal – third place	2007 Rio de Janeiro	Madison
Central American and Caribbean Games
Silver medal – second place	2002 San Salvador	4000m Team Pursuit
Silver medal – second place	2006 Cartagena	Team pursuit
Silver medal – second place	2006 Cartagena	Points race

Andris José Hernández Gimenez (born January 11, 1982) is a male professional track and road racing cyclist from Venezuela. He won three medals for his native country at the 2007 Pan American Games in Rio de Janeiro, Brazil.

== Career ==
2002
2nd Team pursuit, Central American and Caribbean Games
2006
1st Pan American Points Race Championships
Central American and Caribbean Games

2nd Team pursuit
2nd Points race

2nd National Time Trial Championships
3rd Overall Vuelta al Oriente
2007
Pan American Games

1st Points race
2nd Team sprint
3rd Madison

2nd Pan American Points Race Championships
9th Overall Vuelta a Venezuela
2008
1st Stage 4 Clásico Virgen de la Consolación de Táriba
2nd Clásico Gobernación de Anzoátegui
3rd Overall Clásico Ciclístico Batalla de Carabobo
2009
1st Stage 6 Tour de Guadeloupe
3rd Overall Vuelta Ciclista Aragua
2014
Vuelta a Venezuela

1st Mountains classification
1st Stage 2

2016
5th Overall Vuelta a Venezuela
