= Mauricio Neiza =

Colombian cyclist

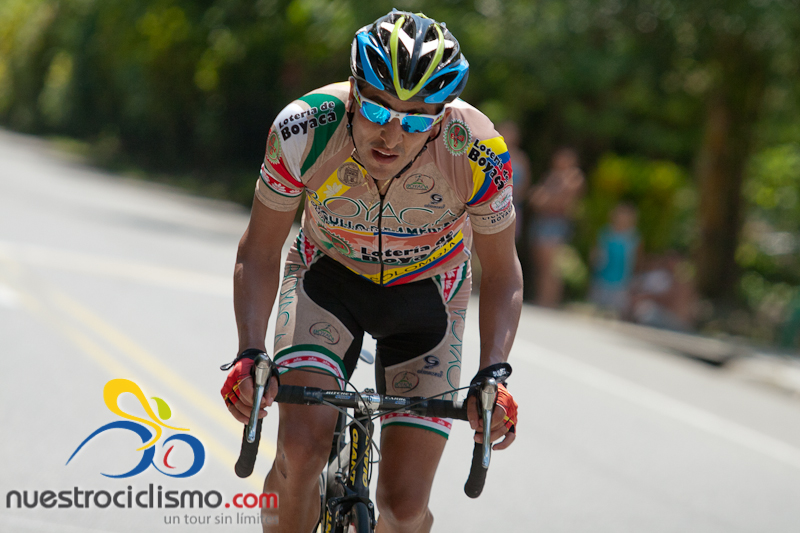
Mauricio Neiza

Mauricio Neiza Alvarado (born 3 September 1981 in Sora, Boyacá) is a male professional road cyclist from Colombia.

== Career ==
2002
1st in Stage 1 Vuelta a Colombia Sub-23, La Ceja (COL)
2003
3rd in Colombia National Championships, Road, ITT, U23, Colombia (COL)
2004
1st in Stage 1 Vuelta a Colombia, Pasto (COL)
2005
3rd in Circuito de Combita (COL)
3rd in General Classification Vuelta al Tolima (COL)
10th in General Classification Vuelta a Colombia (COL)
1st in Mountains Classification Clásico RCN (COL)
7th in General Classification Clásico RCN (COL)
3rd in General Classification Doble Copacabana GP Fides (BOL)
2006
3rd in Colombia National Championships, Road, ITT, Elite, Colombia, Popayán (COL)
1st in Stage 2 Clasica International de Tulcan (ECU)
2009
1st in Stage 2 Clásica Club Deportivo Boyacá, Tunja (COL)
