= Alexander González (cyclist) =

Colombian cyclist (born 1979)

Personal information
- Born: Cali, Valle del Cauca
Medal record
Men's track cycling
Representing Colombia
Pan American Games
Silver medal – second place	2007 Rio de Janeiro	Madison
Central American and Caribbean Games
Gold medal – first place	2006 Cartagena	Team Pursuit

Alexander González Peña (born November 1, 1979) is a male professional track and road racing cyclist from Colombia. He won a silver medal for his native country at the 2007 Pan American Games in Rio de Janeiro, Brazil.

== Career ==
2003
(bronze) in Pan American Games, Track, Team Pursuit, Santo Domingo (DOM)
(silver) in Pan American Games, Track, Madison, Santo Domingo (DOM)
1st in Aguascalientes, Team Pursuit (MEX)

alongside José Serpa, Carlos Alzate, and Juan Pablo Forero

1st in Prologue Vuelta al Valle del Cauca, Velodromo Alcides Nieto Patino (COL)
1st in Colombia National Championship, Track, Pursuit, Duitama (COL)
2004
(silver) in Pan American Championships, Track, Team Pursuit, San Carlos Tinaquillo

alongside José Serpa and Rafael Abreu

2005
(bronze) in Pan American Championships, Track, Team Pursuit, Mar del Plata (ARG)
(bronze) in Pan American Championships, Track, Madison, Mar del Plata (ARG)
2007
(silver) in Pan American Games, Track, Madison, Rio de Janeiro (BRA)
2008
3rd in UCI World Cup, Track, Team Pursuit, Cali, (COL)
2009
1st in Stage 7 Vuelta a la Independencia Nacional, Bani (DOM)
