= William Guerrero =

Colombian footballer (born 1990)

Personal information
- Full name: William Leonardo Guerrero Prins
- Date of birth: 6 September 1990 (age 36)
- Place of birth: Colombia
- Height: 1.70 m (5 ft 7 in)
- Position: Midfielder

Youth career
- 2010: Barranquilla (under 20)

Senior career*
Years	Team	Apps	(Gls)
2011–2012	Barranquilla		
2013	Chalatenango		
2014	Marte Soyapango		
2014–2015	Real Destroyer		
2015–2016	Sonsonate		
2016	UES	10	(0)
2017	Once Municipal		
2018–2019	Platense		
- * Club domestic league appearances and goals

William Leonardo Guerrero Prins (born 6 September 1990) is a Colombian professional footballer.

== Club career ==
=== Sonsonate ===
Guerrero signed with Sonsonate in the Apertura 2015 tournament. He continued on the team for the Clausura 2016 and left the club after the tournament ended.

=== UES ===
Guerrero signed with UES in the Apertura 2016 tournament. He left the club after the tournament ended.

=== Once Municipal ===
In 2017 he signed with Once Municipal.

=== Platense ===
Guerrero signed with Platense in the Apertura 2018 of Segunda División. In November 2018, Guerrero scored an Olympic goal against Santa Rosa Guachipilin in a 3–1 victory.
