= Francisca Campos =

Chilean cyclist

Personal information
- Born: July 19, 1985 (age 40)
Medal record
Women's mountain bike racing
Representing Chile
Pan American Games
Bronze medal – third place	2003 Santo Domingo	Cross-Country

Francisca Linoska Campos Salas (born July 19, 1985, in Antofagasta) is a female cyclist from Chile, specializing in competitive mountain biking.

Campos represented her native South American country at the 2008 Summer Olympics, where she finished in 25th place in the final rankings of the women's cross-country race. In 2003, she claimed the bronze medal at the Pan American Games in Santo Domingo, Dominican Republic, behind Argentina's Jimena Florit (gold) and USA's Mary McConneloug (silver).

Campos started her biking career at the age of 10. Soon she participated in national championships and can look back on impressive successes:

- 9 podiums in Panamerican Championships in Mountain Bike.

- 10 times national champion in Mountain Bike and 4 times in Road.

- 3rd place in a Mountain Bike World Cup.

- 3rd place in Tour de France du VTT

- raced for 3 International Mountain Bike Teams.

- the youngest rider in the Olympic Games in Beijing 2008.

- visited 25 countries by racing bike: Argentina, Bolivia, Ecuador, Brazil, Colombia, Venezuela, Puerto Rico, Dominican Republic, Netherlands Antilles, Mexico, USA, Canada, Spain, Andorra, France, Belgium, Switzerland, Germany, Great Britain, Austria, Italy, Slovenia, New Zealand, Philippines and China.
