= Sora, Boyacá =

Coordinates: 5°34′N 73°26′W

Sora
- Municipality and town
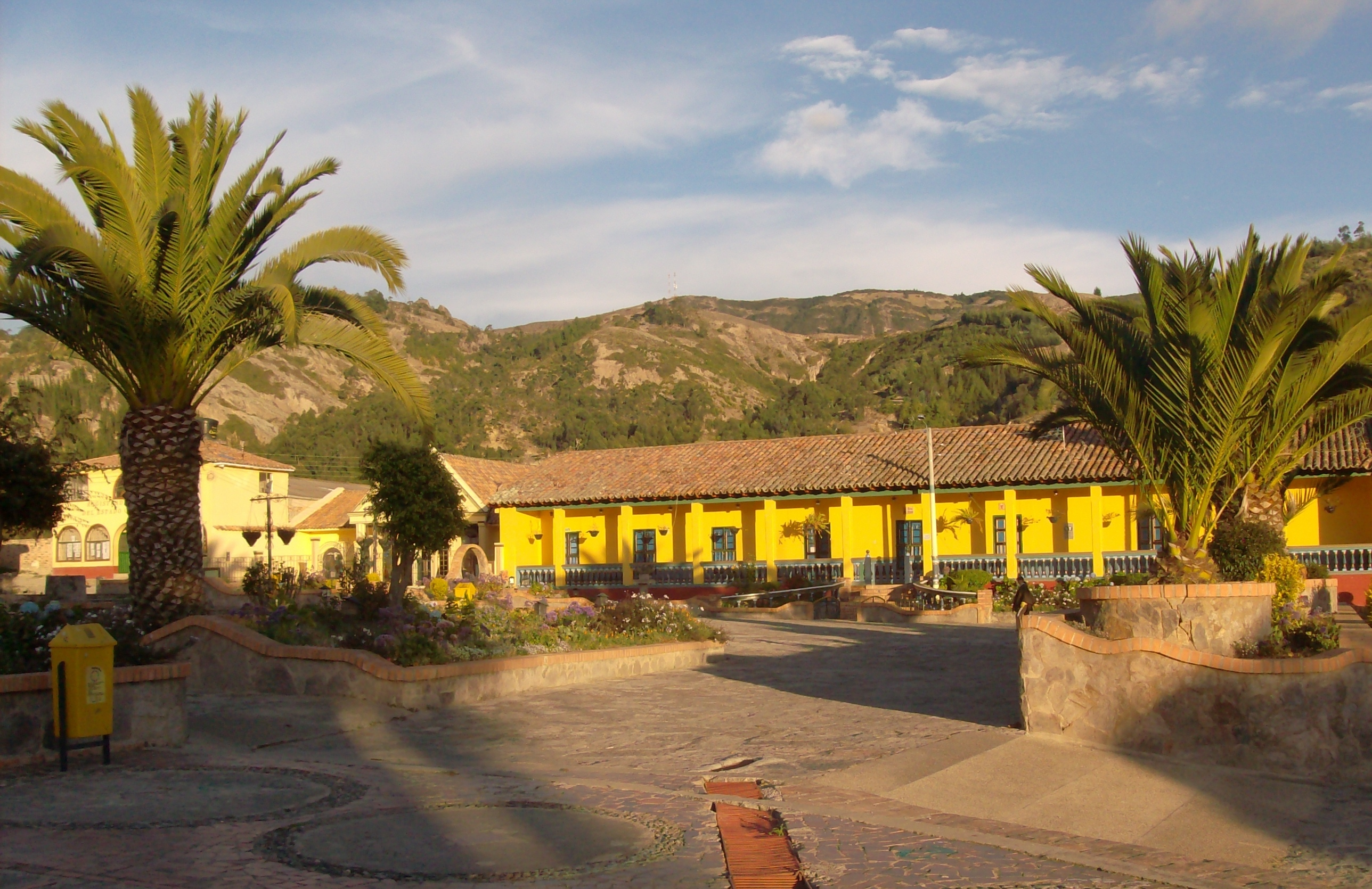
- Central square of Sora

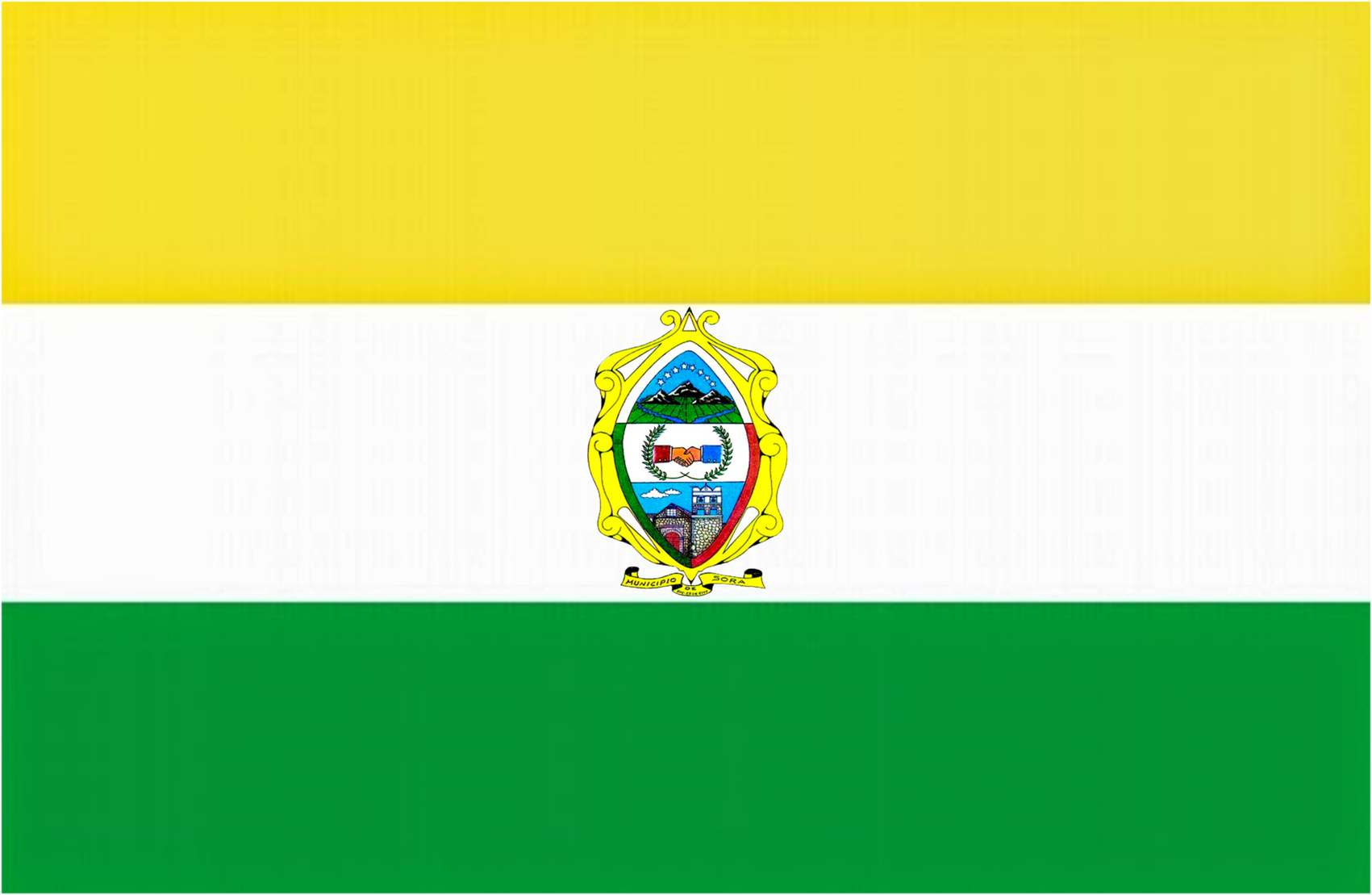
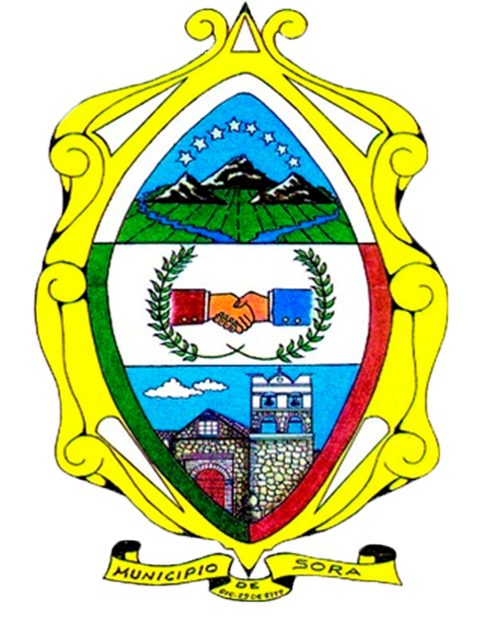
- Flag Coat of arms

- Location of the municipality and town of Sora in the Boyacá department of Colombia
- Country: Colombia
- Department: Boyacá Department
- Province: Central Boyacá Province
- Founded: 12 August 1556
- Founder: Tomás Gualba Castellanos

Government
  - Mayor: Flavio Hernán Largo Durán (2020-2023)

Area
  - Municipality and town: 42 km^{2} (16 sq mi)
  - Urban: 1.08 km^{2} (0.42 sq mi)
- Elevation: 2,650 m (8,690 ft)

Population (2015)
  - Municipality and town: 3,025
  - Density: 72/km^{2} (190/sq mi)
  - Urban: 499
- Time zone: UTC-5 (Colombia Standard Time)
- Website: Official website

Sora is a town and municipality in the Central Boyacá Province, part of the Colombian Department of Boyacá. Sora borders Motavita and Chíquiza in the north, Cucaita and Samacá in the south, Motavita and department capital Tunja in the east and Sáchica and Chíquiza in the west.

== Etymology ==
The name Sora comes from Chibcha and means "Devil worshipper".

== History ==
In the times before the Spanish conquest, the area of Sora was inhabited by the Muisca, organised in their loose Muisca Confederation. Sora was under the rule of the zaque from nearby Hunza.

Modern Sora was founded on August 12, 1556 by Tomás Gualba Castellanos.

== Born in Sora ==
- Mauricio Neiza, professional cyclist

== Gallery ==
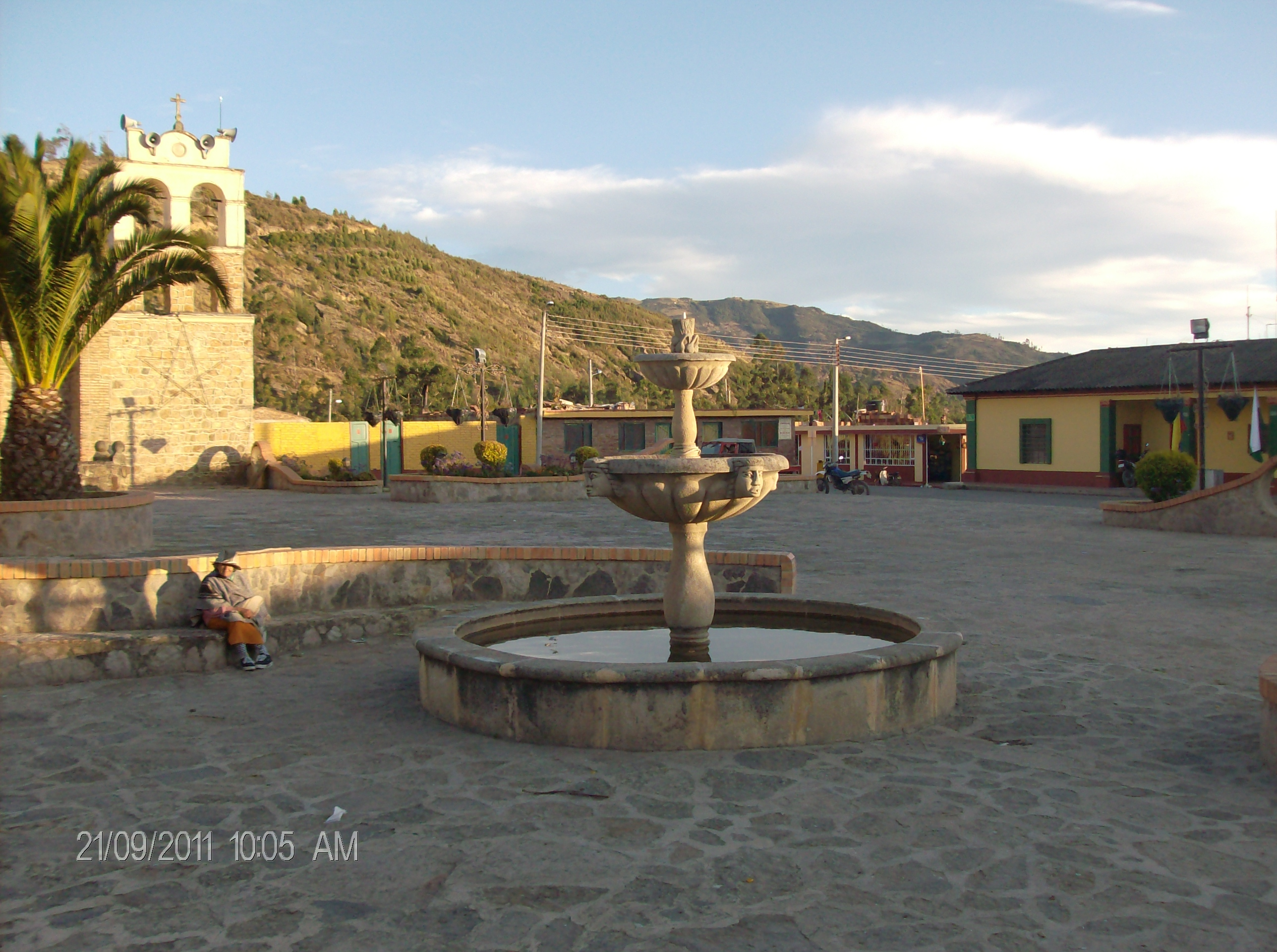
Central square

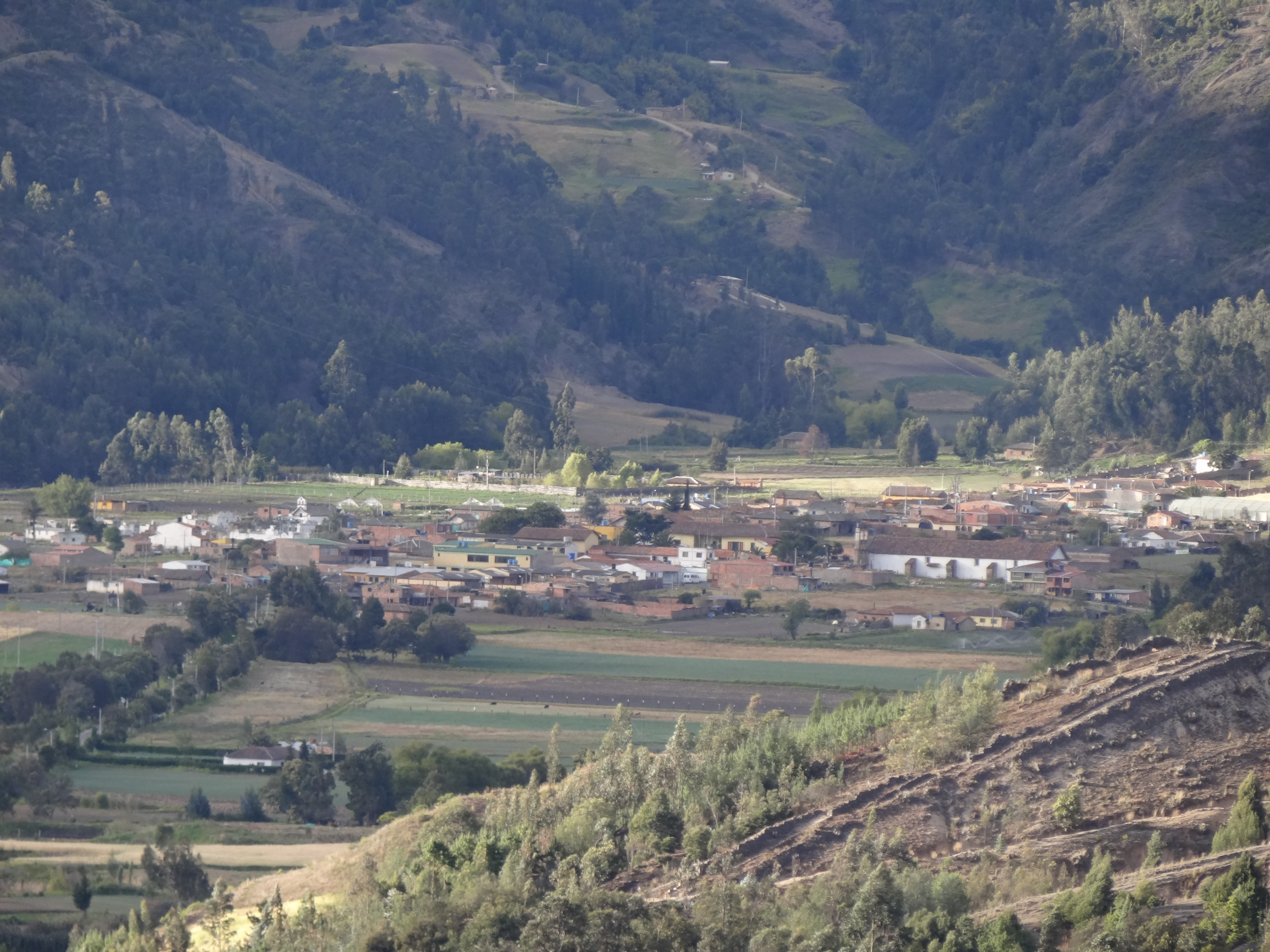
View of Sora

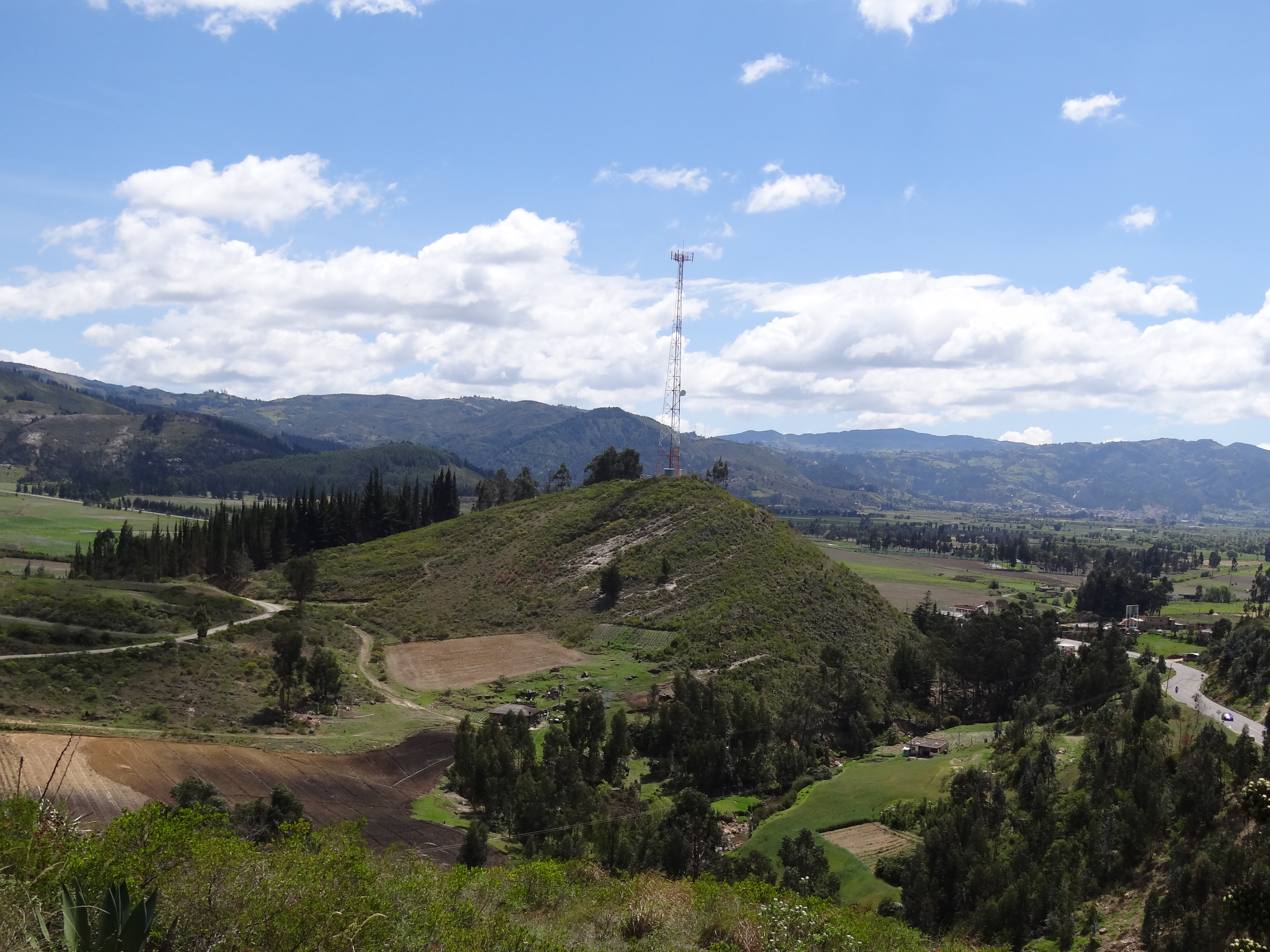
Border of Sora, Cucaita and Samacá

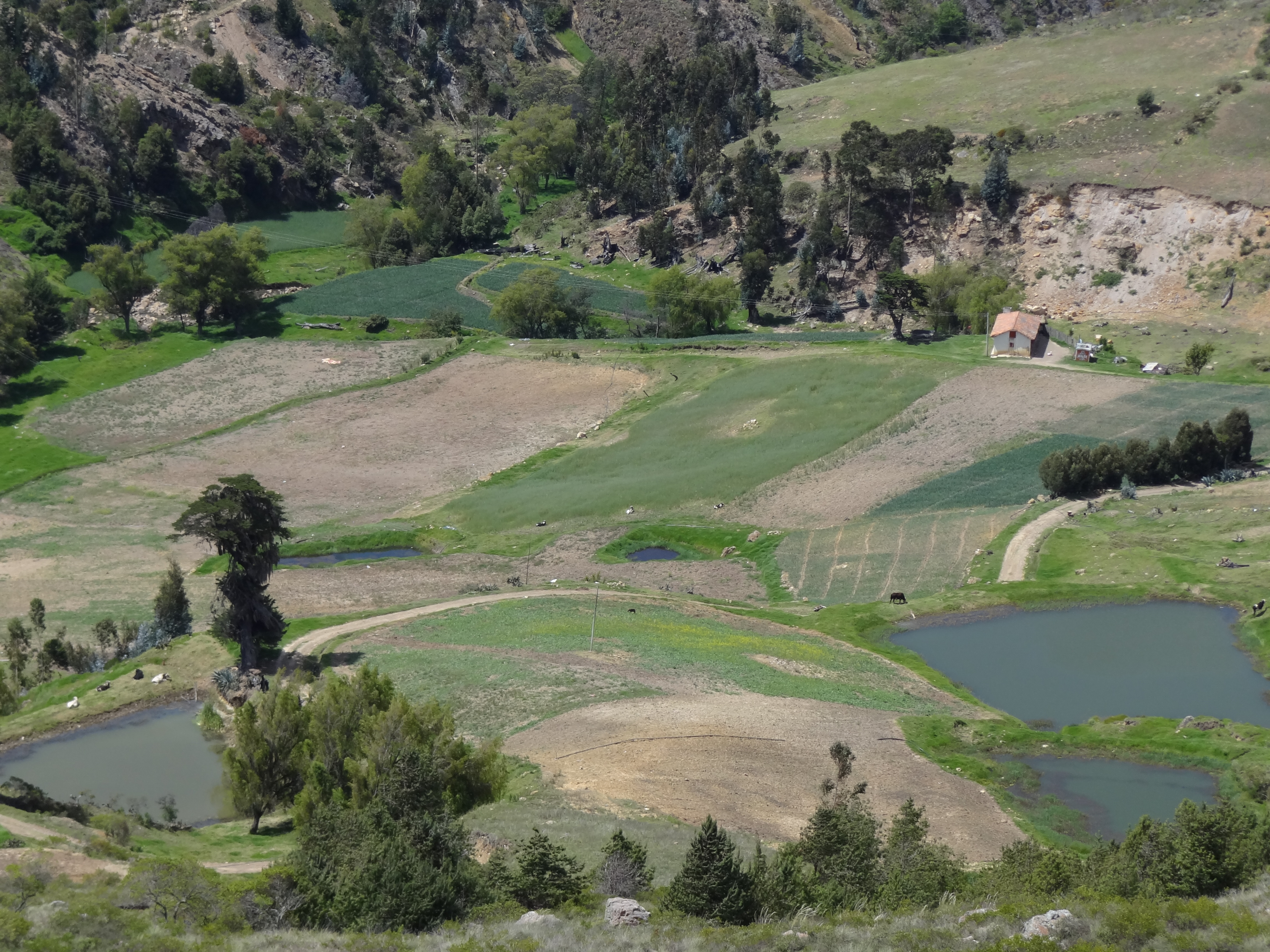
Farm fields in rural Sora
