= Alcalá, Valle del Cauca =

Alcalá
- Municipality and town
- Flag Coat of arms
- Nickname: El Saman
- Location of the municipality and town of Alcalá, Valle del Cauca in the Valle del Cauca Department of Colombia.

- Location in Colombia
- Coordinates: 4°40′N 75°45′W
- Country: Colombia
- Department: Valle del Cauca Department
- Region: Andean
- Demonym: Alcalaino(a)
- Founded: 1791

Government
  - Mayor: William Velazquez Villa

Area
  - Total: 61 km^{2} (24 sq mi)
- Elevation: 1,290 m (4,230 ft)

Population (2015)
  - Total: 21,352
  - Density: 350/km^{2} (910/sq mi)
- Time zone: UTC-5 (Colombia Standard Time)
- Climate: Cfb

Alcalá is a town and municipality located in the Department of Valle del Cauca, Colombia.

== Climate ==
Climate data for Alcalá (Arturo Gomez), elevation 1,320 m (4,330 ft), (1971–2000)
Month	Jan	Feb	Mar	Apr	May	Jun	Jul	Aug	Sep	Oct	Nov	Dec	Year
Mean daily maximum °C (°F)	27.7 (81.9)	27.9 (82.2)	27.8 (82.0)	27.0 (80.6)	26.5 (79.7)	26.8 (80.2)	27.5 (81.5)	27.7 (81.9)	27.2 (81.0)	26.4 (79.5)	26.6 (79.9)	27.0 (80.6)	27.1 (80.8)
Daily mean °C (°F)	21.4 (70.5)	21.5 (70.7)	21.5 (70.7)	21.1 (70.0)	20.9 (69.6)	21.1 (70.0)	21.5 (70.7)	21.6 (70.9)	21.0 (69.8)	20.5 (68.9)	20.7 (69.3)	21.0 (69.8)	21.2 (70.2)
Mean daily minimum °C (°F)	16.3 (61.3)	16.4 (61.5)	16.6 (61.9)	16.6 (61.9)	16.5 (61.7)	16.4 (61.5)	15.9 (60.6)	16.0 (60.8)	16.0 (60.8)	16.3 (61.3)	16.5 (61.7)	16.4 (61.5)	16.3 (61.3)
Average precipitation mm (inches)	109.1 (4.30)	103.1 (4.06)	163.7 (6.44)	220.9 (8.70)	224.3 (8.83)	149.5 (5.89)	87.8 (3.46)	115.3 (4.54)	150.7 (5.93)	232.4 (9.15)	213.5 (8.41)	141.8 (5.58)	1,912.1 (75.28)
Average precipitation days	14	14	18	21	22	18	15	15	19	22	21	17	215
Average relative humidity (%)	76	76	76	79	81	79	75	74	77	80	80	79	78
Mean monthly sunshine hours	164.3	138.5	148.8	129.0	124.0	141.0	179.8	164.3	141.0	127.1	132.0	139.5	1,729.3
Mean daily sunshine hours	5.3	4.9	4.8	4.3	4.0	4.7	5.8	5.3	4.7	4.1	4.4	4.5	4.7
Source: Instituto de Hidrologia Meteorologia y Estudios Ambientales
