= Carlos Alzate =

Colombian cyclist (born 1983)

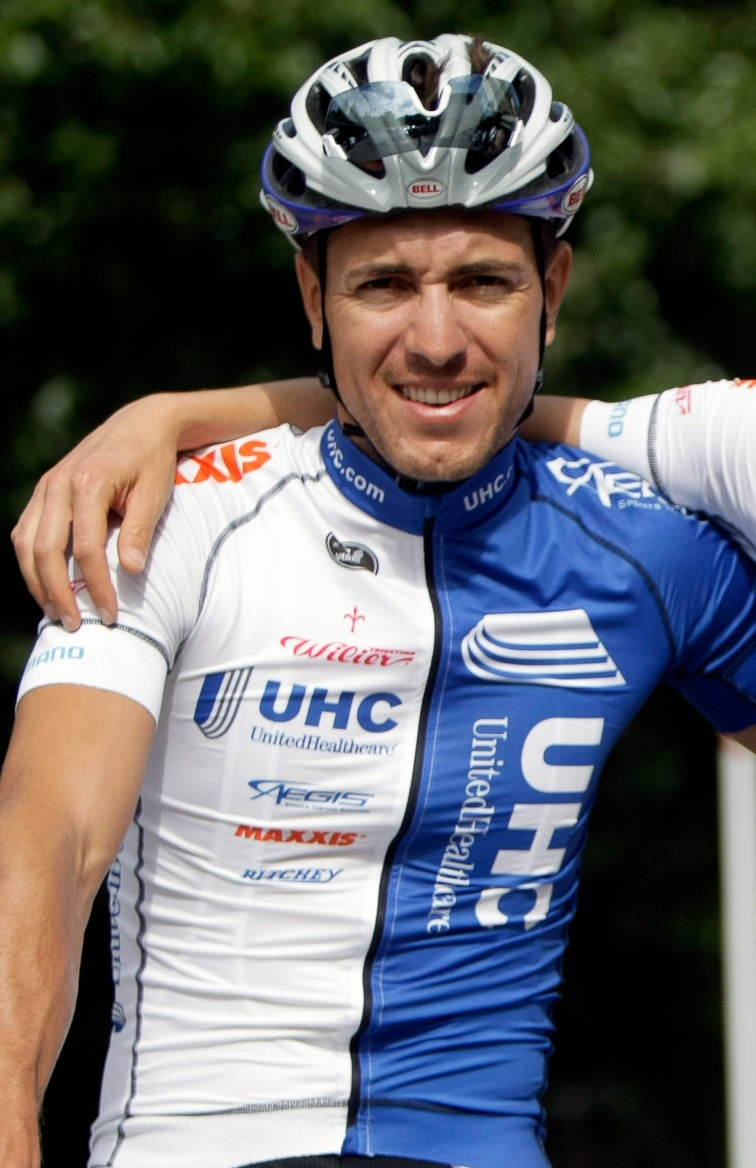
- Carlos Alzate in 2014

Personal information
- Full name: Carlos Eduardo Alzate Escobar
- Born: 23 March 1983 (age 43) Tuluá, Valle del Cauca, Colombia
- Height: 1.80 m (5 ft 11 in)
- Weight: 74 kg (163 lb)

Cycling career
- Sport: Cycling
- Disciplines: Road; Track
- Role: Rider
- Rider type: Sprinter

Amateur teams
- 2010: Rock Racing–Murcia
- 2010: Super Giros

Professional teams
- 2007: Colombia es Pasión
- 2008: Toshiba–Santo
- 2011–2012: Team Exergy
- 2013–2018: UnitedHealthcare
- 2019: GW–Shimano
Medal record
Men's track cycling
Representing Colombia
Pan American Games
Silver medal – second place	2007 Rio de Janeiro	Team Pursuit
Central American and Caribbean Games
Silver medal – second place	2002 San Salvador	4000m Team Pursuit
Silver medal – second place	2006 Cartagena	Individual Pursuit

Carlos Eduardo Alzate Escobar (born March 23, 1983, in Tuluá, Valle del Cauca) is a Colombian professional track and road racing cyclist from Colombia, who most recently rode for the GW–Shimano team. He won a silver medal for his native country at the 2007 Pan American Games in Rio de Janeiro, Brazil alongside Juan Pablo Forero, Arles Castro and Jairo Pérez in the Men's Track Team Pursuit. He competed at the 2008 Summer Olympics in Beijing, PR China.

== Major results ==
2003
1st in Aguascalientes, Team Pursuit

alongside José Serpa, Alexander González, and Juan Pablo Forero

2nd National Points Race Championships
2004
1st Stage 4 Vuelta a Colombia Sub-23
2005
International Cycling Classic

1st Stages 7 & 13

3rd National Individual Pursuit Championships
(bronze) Pan American Championships, Track, Team Pursuit
2006
1st Stage 8 Vuelta a El Salvador
2007
1st Stage 4 Vuelta al Valle del Cauca
Pan American Championships

1st Individual pursuit
1st Team pursuit (alongside Jairo Pérez, Arles Castro, and Juan Pablo Forero)

(silver) Pan American Games, Track, Team Pursuit

alongside Jairo Pérez, Arles Castro, and Juan Pablo Forero

2008
1st Stage 12 International Cycling Classic
2009
1st Stage 5 Vuelta a Cundinamarca
2011
1st 13th Annual Ontario GP
3rd Roswell Criterium
3rd Beaufort Memorial Classic
3rd Global Imports Sandy Springs Cycling Challenge
4th Sea Otter Classic Criterium
6th Sea Otter Classic Circuit Race
2012
1st Circuito Feria de Manizales
1st USA Crits speedweek Walterboro Criterium
1st USA Crits speedweek Sandy Springs Criterium
1st Stage 2 Nature Valley Grand Prix
1st Stage 4 Cascade Classic
2nd Sunny King Criterium
2013
1st Sunny King Criterium
1st Costal Empire Cycling Festival
1st USA Crits speedweek
1st Belmont Criterium
1st Tour de Grove
1st Base Camp International Basking Ridge
2nd Glencoe GP
2nd Chris Thater memorial Criterium
3rd USA Crits Finals, Las Vegas
2014
1st Charlotte Belmont Omnium
1st Sunny King Criterium
9th Winston Salem Cycling Classic Criterium
2015
7th Dana Point Grand Prix
7th Wilmington Grand Prix
8th Winston-Salem Classic Criterium
2016
1st Stage 3 Joe Martin Stage Race
2nd Clarendon Cup
2017
3rd Overall Tour of Taihu Lake
