= Nélson Vargas =

Colombian cyclist (born 1973)

Nélson Vargas de Jesús (born September 27, 1973) is a retired male road racing cyclist from Colombia.

== Career ==
1999
3rd in Stage 4 Clásico RCN, Ibagué (COL)
2001
2nd in Stage 12 Vuelta a Colombia, Socorro (COL)
3rd in Stage 8 Clásico RCN, Parque Nacional circuito (COL)
