= Edvandro Cruz =

Brazilian cyclist

Personal information
- Born: July 19, 1978 (age 47)
Medal record
Men's mountain bike racing
Representing Brazil
Pan American Games
Silver medal – second place	2003 Santo Domingo	Cross-Country

Edvandro de Souza Cruz (born July 19, 1978 in Ilhabela, São Paulo) is a male cyclist from Brazil who specializes in competitive mountain biking. Cruz represented his native South American country at the 2004 Summer Olympics in Athens, where he finished in 33rd position. A year earlier he was runner-up behind Jeremiah Bishop at the 2003 Pan American Games.

== Physical Build ==
Cruz is 5 feet, 6.5 inches tall and weighs 126 pounds.
