= Juan Pablo Forero =

Colombian cyclist (born 1983)

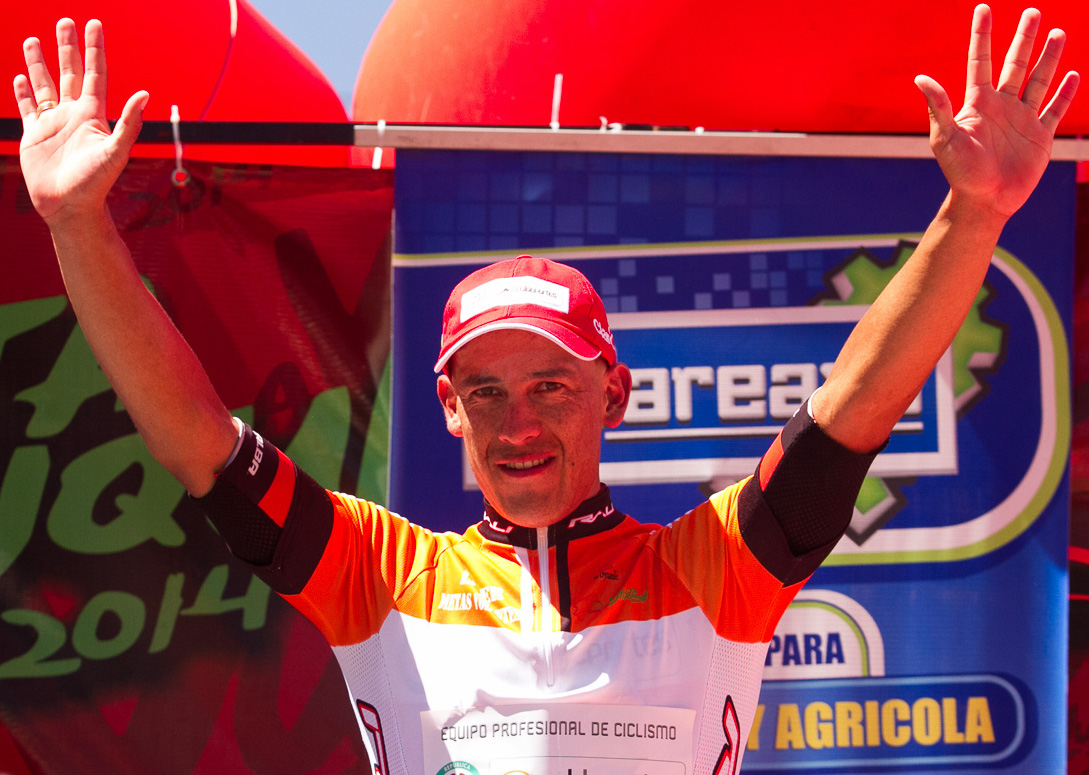

Personal information
- Full name: Juan Pablo Forero Carreño
- Born: 3 August 1983 (age 43) Cota, Cundinamarca, Colombia

Cycling career
- Sport: Cycling
- Current team: Colombia
- Disciplines: Road and Track
- Role: Rider
- Rider type: All-around

Professional teams
- 2006–2011: Colombia es Pasión
- 2012–: Colombia–Coldeportes
Medal record
Representing Colombia
Pan American Games
Silver medal – second place	2007 Rio de Janeiro	Team pursuit
Bronze medal – third place	2003 Santo Domingo	Team pursuit

Juan Pablo Forero Carreño (born August 3, 1983) is a professional track and road cyclist from Colombia. He has represented Colombia at the 2007 Pan American Games in Rio de Janeiro, Brazil where he won a silver medal in team pursuit with teammates Carlos Alzate, Arles Castro and Jairo Pérez. He also competed at the 2008 Summer Olympics in Beijing, PR China. He was born in Cota, Cundinamarca.

== Career ==
2003
1st Stage 3 Clásica Nacional Ciudad de Anapoima
1st Aguascalientes World Cup – Team Pursuit

alongside José Serpa, Alexander González, and Carlos Alzate

2nd National Track Championships – Madison
(bronze) Pan American Games – Team Pursuit

alongside José Serpa, Alexander González, and Arles Castro

2004
1st Prologue & Stage 3 Vuelta a Colombia Sub-23
2005
1st National Under-23 Road Championships
1st Stage 5 Vuelta al Valle del Cauca
1st Prologue Vuelta ciclista a la Republica del Ecuador
2nd National Track Championships – Scratch
2006
1st Stages 6, 11 & 15 Vuelta a Colombia
2007
(gold) Pan American Track Championships – Team Pursuit

alongside Jairo Pérez, Arles Castro, and Carlos Alzate

1st Stage 1 Vuelta al Valle del Cauca
(silver) Pan American Games – Team Pursuit

alongside Jairo Pérez, Arles Castro, and Carlos Alzate

3rd Overall Tour de Nez
2008
1st Stage 2 Vuelta al Tolima
1st Stage 15 International Cycling Classic
1st Stage 4 Vuelta a Cundinamarca
1st Stage 4 Clásico RCN
2009
1st Stages 1 & 4 Clasica International de Tulcan
2nd Circuito de Getxo
2012
1st Stage 5 Vuelta a Colombia
