= Arles Castro =

Colombian cyclist (born 1979)

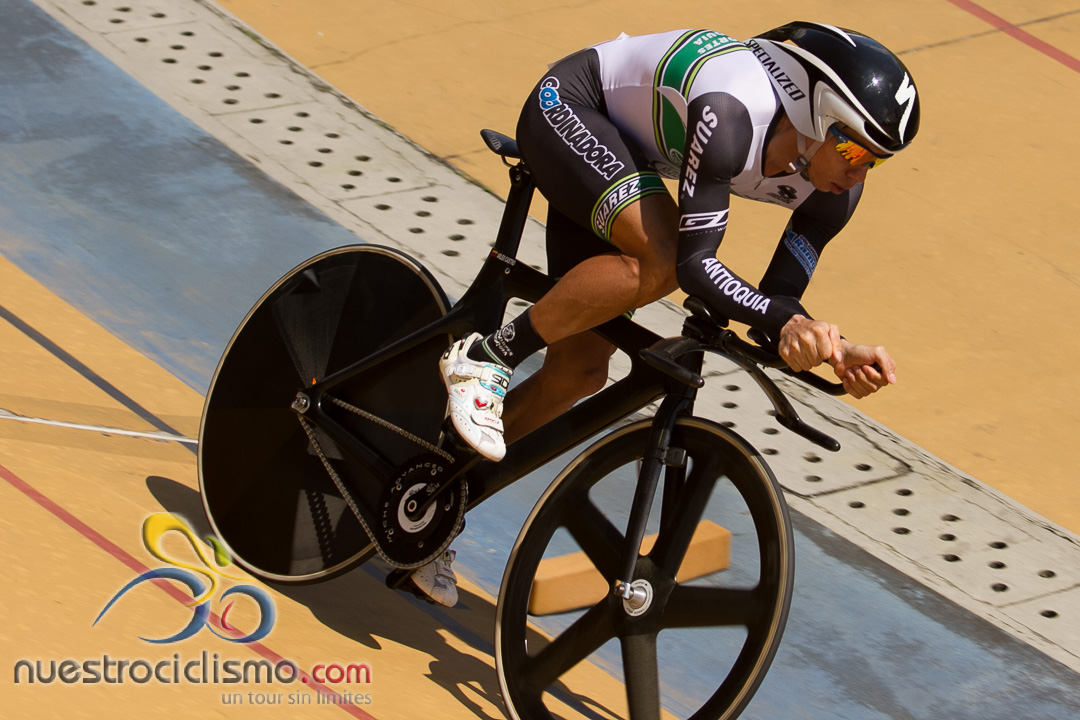
- Castro in 2013

Personal information
- Full name: Arles Antonio Castro Laverde
- Born: July 17, 1979 (age 47) Urrao, Colombia

Cycling career
- Sport: Cycling
- Disciplines: Road and track
- Role: Rider
Medal record
Men's track cycling
Representing Colombia
Pan American Games
Gold medal – first place	2011 Guadalajara	Team pursuit
Gold medal – first place	2015 Toronto	Team pursuit
Silver medal – second place	2007 Rio de Janeiro	Team pursuit
Bronze medal – third place	2003 Santo Domingo	Team pursuit
Pan American Championships
Gold medal – first place	2007 Valencia	Points race
Gold medal – first place	2007 Valencia	Team pursuit
Gold medal – first place	2010 Aguascalientes	Team pursuit
Gold medal – first place	2011 Medellin	Individual pursuit
Gold medal – first place	2011 Medellin	Team pursuit
Gold medal – first place	2014 Aguascalientes	Team pursuit
Gold medal – first place	2015 Santiago	Team pursuit
Central American and Caribbean Games
Gold medal – first place	2006 Cartagena	Team Pursuit
Bolivarian Games
Gold medal – first place	2013 Trujillo	Team Pursuit

Arles Antonio Castro Laverde (born July 17, 1979) is a male professional track and road racing cyclist from Colombia. He won a silver medal for his native country at the 2007 Pan American Games in Rio de Janeiro, Brazil alongside Carlos Alzate, Jairo Pérez and Juan Pablo Forero in the Men's Track Team Pursuit. He competed at the 2008 Summer Olympics in Beijing, PR China and the 2012 Summer Olympics in London.

== Career ==
2001
2nd in UCI World Cup, Track, Team Pursuit, Cali, (COL)
2003
2nd in Colombia National Championship, Track, Pursuit, Duitama (COL)
: in Pan American Games, Track, Team Pursuit, Santo Domingo (DOM)
2005
1st in Stage 2 Vuelta a El Salvador, Chalatenangno (ESA)

alongside Miguel Duarte, Jorge Contreras, Carlos Salazar, Paulo Andres Velez, Franco Marvulli, and Giuseppe Atzeni

2007
in Pan American Championships, Track, Points Race, Valencia (VEN)
in Pan American Championships, Track, Team Pursuit, Valencia (VEN)

alongside Juan Pablo Forero, Jairo Pérez, and Carlos Alzate

in Pan American Games, Track, Team Pursuit, Rio de Janeiro (BRA)

alongside Juan Pablo Forero, Jairo Pérez, and Carlos Alzate

2008
3rd in UCI World Cup, Track, Individual Pursuit, Cali, (COL)
3rd in UCI World Cup, Track, Team Pursuit, Cali, (COL)
2010
2nd in UCI World Cup, Track, Team Pursuit, Cali, (COL)
2011
in Pan American Games, Track, Team Pursuit, Guadalajara (MEX)

alongside Juan Esteban Arango, Edwin Ávila and Weimar Roldan

2012
1st in UCI World Cup, Track, Team Pursuit, Cali (COL)
2013
in Bolivarian Games, Track, Team Pursuit, Trujillo (PER)
