= Juan Diego Ramírez =

Colombian cyclist

Personal information
- Full name: Juan Diego Ramírez Calderón
- Born: July 21, 1971 (age 55) Colombia

Cycling career
- Sport: Cycling
- Current team: Retired
- Discipline: Road
- Role: Rider

Major wins
- Clásico RCN (2000, 2001); Pan American Championships (2001); Vuelta al Tolima (2008)

Juan Diego Ramírez Calderón (born July 21, 1971 in La Ceja, Antioquia) is a male road cyclist from Colombia.

== Career ==
1994
1st in General Classification Vuelta a Boyacá (COL)
1995
1st in General Classification Clásica Nacional Marco Fidel Suárez (COL)
4th in General Classification Clásico RCN (COL)
2nd in Stage 2 Vuelta a Colombia, Pacho (COL)
2nd in Stage 6 Vuelta a Colombia, Chinchina (COL)
2nd in Stage 11 Vuelta a Colombia, Ibagué (COL)
1st in Stage 13 Vuelta a Colombia, Bogota (COL)
2nd in General Classification Vuelta a Colombia (COL)
1996
1st in Stage 8 Vuelta a Colombia, Palestina (COL)
1997
5th in General Classification Clásico RCN (COL)
1st in Stage 4 Vuelta a Colombia, Ibagué (COL)
2nd in Stage 10 Vuelta a Colombia, Alto Santa Helena (COL)
1st in General Mountains Classification Vuelta a Colombia (COL)
4th in General Classification Vuelta a Colombia (COL)
1998
3rd in Stage 2 Vuelta a Colombia, Cáqueza (COL)
2nd in Stage 8 Vuelta a Colombia, Manizales (COL)
1999
3rd in Stage 1 Clásico RCN, Barbosa (COL)
2nd in Stage 3 Clásico RCN, Alto de Patios (COL)
3rd in Stage 7 Clásico RCN, El Cable (COL)
3rd in General Classification Clásico RCN (COL)
2000
1st in General Classification Vuelta a los Santanderes (COL)
3rd in Stage 6 Clásico RCN, Cajamarca (COL)
2nd in Stage 9 Clásico RCN, Bogotà, Alto de Patios (COL)
1st in General Classification Clásico RCN (COL)
2001
(gold) in Pan American Championships, Road, Elite
2nd in Stage 9 Vuelta a Colombia, Honda (COL)
2nd in Stage 15 Vuelta a Colombia, Alto de Patios (COL)
2nd in General Classification Vuelta a Colombia (COL)
2nd in Stage 1 Clásico RCN, Jerico (COL)
3rd in Stage 2 Clásico RCN, Manizales (COL)
1st in Stage 4 Clásico RCN, Ibagué (COL)
3rd in Stage 6 Clásico RCN, Villa de Leyva (COL)
1st in General Classification Clásico RCN (COL)
2002
3rd in Stage 2 Clasica de la Feria, Manizales (COL)
1st in Stage 1 Clasica de la Feria, Manizales (COL)
1st in General Classification Clasica de la Feria (COL)
2nd in Stage 2 Clasica Alcaldía de Pasca, Cabrera (COL)
1st in Stage 1 Clasica Alcaldía de Pasca, Pasca (COL)
2nd in Stage 3 Clasica Alcaldía de Pasca, Pasca (COL)
1st in General Classification Clasica Alcaldía de Pasca (COL)
12th in Stage 6 Giro d'Italia, Varazze (ITA)
11th in Stage 11 Giro d'Italia, Campitello Matese (ITA)
2nd in Stage 13 Vuelta a Colombia, El Escobero (COL)
2003
1st in Stage 15 Vuelta a las Americas, Toluca (MEX)
2nd in Stage 3 part a Vuelta de la Paz (COL)
3rd in General Classification Vuelta de la Paz (COL)
2nd in Stage 3 Vuelta al Tolima, El Fresno (COL)
2nd in General Classification Vuelta al Tolima (COL)
2nd in General Classification Doble Sucre Potosí GP Cemento Fancesa (BOL)
2004
2nd in Stage 3 Doble Sucre Potosí GP Cemento Fancesa, Sucre (BOL)
2nd in Stage 5 Vuelta a Colombia, Jericó (COL)
2005
3rd in General Classification Vuelta al Cauca (COL)
1st in Stage 7 Vuelta a Boyacá, Tunja (COL)
3rd in Stage 3 Clásica Nacional Marco Fidel Suárez (COL)
3rd in General Classification Clásica Nacional Marco Fidel Suárez (COL)
2006
3rd in Prologue Clasica International de Tulcan (ECU)
3rd in Stage 4 Doble Sucre Potosí GP Cemento Fancesa, Sucre (BOL)
1st in Stage 10 Vuelta a Colombia, TTT, Buga (COL)
1st in Stage 2 Clasica de Guarné (COL)
1st in Stage 3 Clasica de Guarné, Guarné (COL)
1st in General Classification Clasica de Guarné (COL)
2nd in Stage 1 Vuelta a Antioquia, Santa Rosa de Osas (COL)
3rd in Stage 1 Clásico RCN, Cali (COL)
3rd in Stage 3 Clásico RCN, Manizales (COL)
2nd in Stage 4 Doble Copacabana GP Fides, Viacha (BOL)
2nd in Stage 5 part b Doble Copacabana GP Fides, Copacabana (BOL)
3rd in Stage 6 part a Doble Copacabana GP Fides, San Pedro de Tiquina (BOL)
1st in General Classification Doble Copacabana GP Fides (BOL)
2007
2nd in Stage 2 Clasica Marinilla, Marinilla (COL)
3rd in General Classification Clasica Marinilla (COL)
3rd in Stage 4 Clasica Marinilla, Marinilla (COL)
1st in Stage 1 Clasica de Guarné, Guarné (COL)
1st in Stage 3 Clasica de Guarné, Guarné (COL)
3rd in Stage 4 Clasica de Guarné, Guarné (COL)
3rd in General Classification Clasica de Guarné (COL)
3rd in Stage 12 Vuelta a Colombia, Agua de Dios (COL)
2nd in Stage 2 Clásica Nacional Marco Fidel Suárez, Cisneros (COL)
2008
1st in Stage 1 Vuelta al Tolima, Libano (COL)
1st in General Classification Vuelta al Tolima (COL)
2nd in Stage 9 Vuelta a Colombia, Manizales (COL)
3rd in Stage 3 Clasica de Guarné, Guarné (COL)
1st in Stage 4 Clasica de Guarné, Guarné (COL)
3rd in Stage 4 Vuelta a Boyacá, Sáchica (COL)
2009
1st in Prologue Vuelta a Colombia, TTT, Bogotá (COL)
