= Jairo Salas =

Colombian racing cyclist (born 1984)

- Salas in 2013.

Personal information
- Full name: Jairo Alonso Cano Salas Atehortúa
- Nickname: El pequeño Gigante
- Born: 2 June 1984 (age 42) Amagá, Antioquia, Colombia

Cycling career
- Sport: Cycling
- Discipline: Road
- Role: Rider
- Rider type: Sprinter

Amateur teams
- 2010–2012: GW–Shimano
- 2013–2014: Aguardiente Antioqueño–Lotería de Medellín–IDEA
- 2016–2017: Aguardiente Antioqueño–Lotería de Medellín–Idea Indeportes Antioquia

Professional teams
- 2007–2009: Colombia es Pasión
- 2015: Orgullo Antioqueño
- 2017–2019: EPM

Jairo Alonso Cano Salas Atehortúa (born 2 June 1984 in Amagá, Antioquia) is a Colombian professional road racing cyclist, who last rode for UCI Continental team EPM.

== Major results ==
2005
1st Stage 1 Clásico RCN
2006
Vuelta a Guatemala

1st Points classification
1st Stages 3, 10 & 12

2007
1st Stage 5 Vuelta a Antioquia
1st Stage 3 Vuelta a Guatemala
2008
1st Stage 1 Vuelta al Valle del Cauca
1st Stage 1 Clasica Marinilla
1st Stage 5 Clásica Nacional Marco Fidel Suárez
1st Stage 13 Vuelta a Guatemala
2011
1st Stage 12 Vuelta a Colombia
2013
1st Sprints classification Vuelta a Colombia
2014
1st Stage 11 Vuelta a Colombia
2016
1st Stage 9 Vuelta a Colombia
2017
1st Stage 1 (TTT) Vuelta a Colombia
