= Jairo Hernández =

Colombian cyclist (born 1972)

Jairo de Jesús Hernández Montoya (born August 13, 1972 in Calarcá, Quindío) is a male professional track and road cyclist from Colombia.

== Major results ==
1990
1st in Colombia National Championships, Road, Juniors, Colombia (COL)
1993
1st in Colombia National Championships, Road, Amateurs, Colombia (COL)
1st in General Classification Vuelta a Colombia Sub-23 (COL)
1994
1st in Stage 9 Vuelta a Colombia, Ibagué (COL)
1995
1st in General Classification Vuelta a Guatemala (GUA)
1996
1st in Stage 2 Vuelta a Colombia (COL)
9th in General Classification Vuelta a Colombia (COL)
1st in Prologue Vuelta al Tolima (COL)
1997
1st in Stage 8 Clásico RCN, Puerto Salgar (COL)
1998
1st in Stage 13 Vuelta a Colombia, Duitama (COL)
1999
3rd in Colombia National Championship, Road, ITT, Elite, Colombia (COL)
1st in General Classification Vuelta al Tolima (COL)
1st in Stage 5 Clásico RCN, Roldanillo (COL)
1st in Stage 6 Clásico RCN, Armenia (COL)
1st in Stage 7 Clásico RCN, El Cable (COL)
1st in General Classification Clásico RCN (COL)
2000
3rd in General Classification Vuelta a la Argentina (ARG)
1st in Stage 6 Clásico RCN, Cajamarca (COL)
10th in General Classification Clásico RCN (COL)
2001
(gold) in Pan American Championships, Road, ITT, Elite
1st in Stage 8 Vuelta a Colombia, Manizales (COL)
3rd in General Classification Vuelta a Colombia (COL)
5th in General Classification Clásico RCN (COL)
2002
1st in Stage 4 Vuelta a Antioquia, Medellín (COL)
8th in General Classification Clásico RCN (COL)
2003
1st in Stage 4 Vuelta a Boyacá, Jenesano (COL)
3rd in General Classification Clasico RCN (COL)
1st in Stage 2 Vuelta a los Santanderes, Lebrija (COL)
2nd in General Classification Vuelta a los Santanderes (COL)
2004
1st in Stage 1 Vuelta de la Paz, Sonson (COL)
1st in General Classification Vuelta de la Paz (COL)
1st in Stage 8 Vuelta a Colombia, Jardín (COL)
1st in Stage 9 Vuelta a Colombia, Anserma (COL)
3rd in General Classification Vuelta a Colombia (COL)
1st in Prologue Clásica Ciudad de Girardot, Girardot (COL)
1st in Stage 3 Doble Copacabana GP Fides, La Paz (BOL)

alongside Jorge Humberto Martínez, Javier Zapata, Walter Pedraza, Hernán Darío Muñoz, and Maurizio Henao

1st in Stage 5 part b Doble Copacabana GP Fides, Plaza Copacabana (BOL)
3rd in Colombia National Championship, Road, ITT, Elite, Colombia (COL)
6th in General Classification Vuelta Ciclista de Chile, Chile (CHI)
2005
2nd in General Classification Doble Sucre Potosí GP Cemento Fancesa (BOL)
1st in Stage 1 Clásica Nacional Marco Fidel Suárez (COL)
2nd in General Classification Clásica Nacional Marco Fidel Suárez (COL)
1st in Stage 7 Clásico RCN, Armenia (COL)
3rd in General Classification Clasico RCN (COL)
1st in Stage 6 part a Doble Copacabana GP Fides, San Pedro De Tiquina (BOL)
2006
1st in Stage 3 Vuelta al Tolima, Piedras (COL)
1st in General Classification Vuelta al Tolima (COL)
2007
1st in Stage 2 Clasica de Guarné, Guarné (COL)
2nd in General Classification Clasica de Guarné (COL)
1st in Stage 1 Clásica Nacional Marco Fidel Suárez, Santa Rosa de Osa (COL)
1st in Stage 3 Clásica Nacional Marco Fidel Suárez (COL)
1st in General Classification Clásica Nacional Marco Fidel Suárez (COL)
