= Remolinos =

Coordinates: 41°50′N 1°10′W

- municipality
- Flag Coat of arms
- Interactive map of Remolinos
- Country: Spain
- Autonomous community: Aragon
- Province: Zaragoza

Area
  - Total: 18 km^{2} (6.9 sq mi)

Population (2025-01-01)
  - Total: 1,018
  - Density: 57/km^{2} (150/sq mi)
- Time zone: UTC+1 (CET)
  - Summer (DST): UTC+2 (CEST)

Remolinos is a municipality located in the province of Zaragoza, Aragon, Spain. According to the 2004 census (INE), the municipality has a population of 1,210 inhabitants.

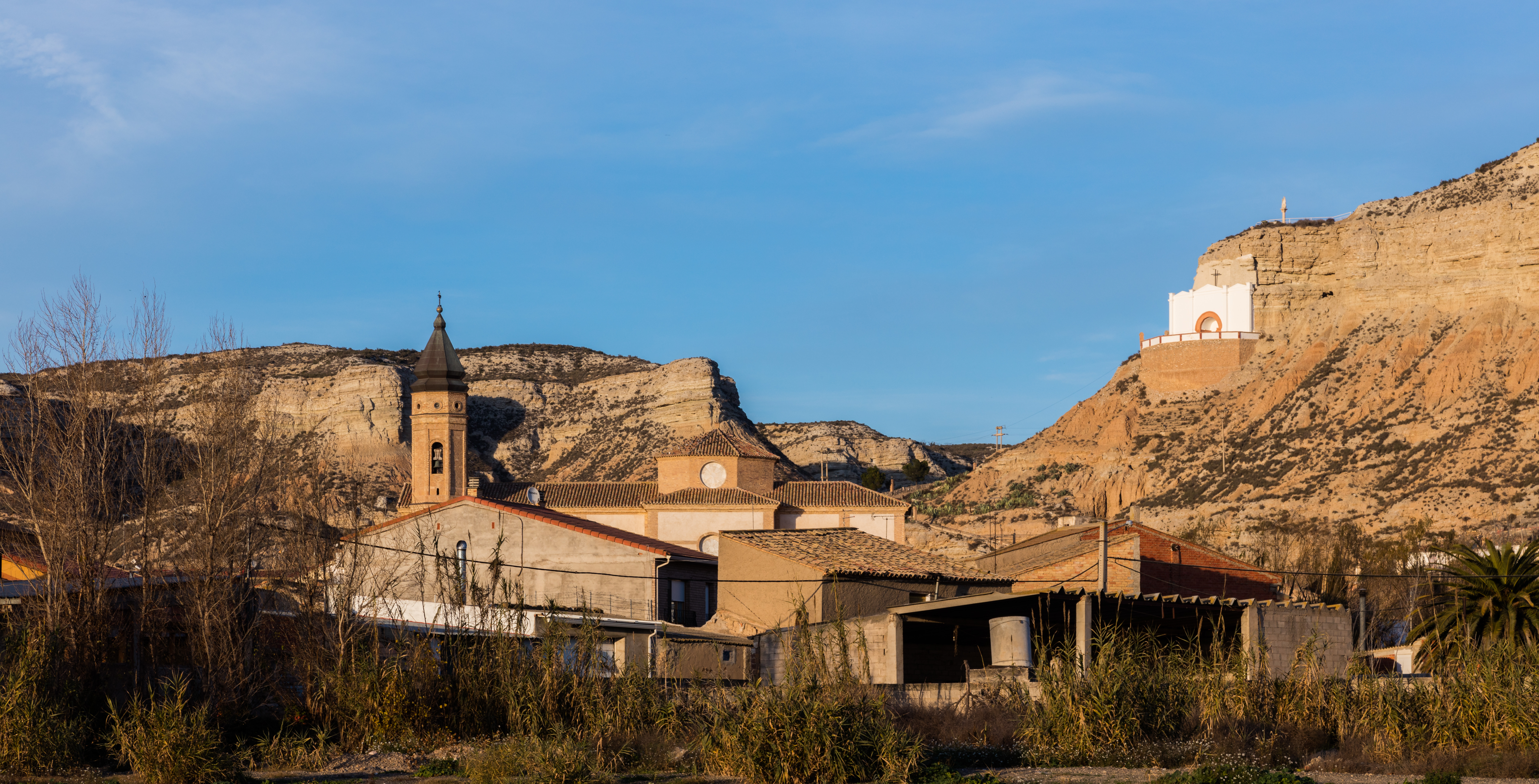
Church of Remolinos, Zaragoza Spain

== See also ==
- List of municipalities in Zaragoza
