= Anserma, Caldas =

Anserma, Caldas Santa Ana de los Caballeros
- Municipality and town
- Flag Coat of arms

- Location of the municipality and town of Anserma, Caldas in the Caldas Department of Colombia.

- Location in Colombia
- Coordinates: 5°14′17″N 75°47′2.55″W
- Country: Colombia
- Department: Caldas Department

Area
  - Municipality and town: 209.1 km^{2} (80.7 sq mi)
  - Urban: 2.13 km^{2} (0.82 sq mi)
- Elevation: 1,790 m (5,870 ft)

Population (2020 est.)
  - Municipality and town: 36,691
  - Density: 175.5/km^{2} (454.5/sq mi)
  - Urban: 20,876
  - Urban density: 9,800/km^{2} (25,400/sq mi)
- Time zone: UTC-5 (Colombia Standard Time)
- Website: Las imagenes más lindas de Anserma

Anserma is a town and municipality in the Colombian Department of Caldas.

Anserma was founded on August 15, 1539 by Marshal Jorge Robledo.

== Climate ==
Climate data for Anserma (Bellavista), elevation 1,932 m (6,339 ft), (1981–2010)
Month	Jan	Feb	Mar	Apr	May	Jun	Jul	Aug	Sep	Oct	Nov	Dec	Year
Mean daily maximum °C (°F)	21.8 (71.2)	21.9 (71.4)	21.7 (71.1)	21.6 (70.9)	21.5 (70.7)	21.4 (70.5)	21.9 (71.4)	22.0 (71.6)	21.5 (70.7)	21.2 (70.2)	20.9 (69.6)	21.0 (69.8)	21.5 (70.7)
Daily mean °C (°F)	16.9 (62.4)	17.1 (62.8)	17.0 (62.6)	17.1 (62.8)	17.2 (63.0)	17.3 (63.1)	17.3 (63.1)	17.3 (63.1)	16.9 (62.4)	16.7 (62.1)	16.6 (61.9)	16.7 (62.1)	17.0 (62.6)
Mean daily minimum °C (°F)	13.3 (55.9)	13.5 (56.3)	13.7 (56.7)	13.8 (56.8)	13.8 (56.8)	13.5 (56.3)	13.1 (55.6)	13.1 (55.6)	13.1 (55.6)	13.4 (56.1)	13.4 (56.1)	13.6 (56.5)	13.4 (56.1)
Average precipitation mm (inches)	99.0 (3.90)	96.0 (3.78)	159.8 (6.29)	238.1 (9.37)	208.8 (8.22)	147.4 (5.80)	134.3 (5.29)	143.5 (5.65)	178.8 (7.04)	221.7 (8.73)	180.3 (7.10)	111.5 (4.39)	1,919.2 (75.56)
Average precipitation days	13	12	17	21	21	16	14	14	18	21	20	15	197
Average relative humidity (%)	87	86	87	88	88	87	85	85	87	87	88	88	87
Mean monthly sunshine hours	133.3	118.6	108.5	87.0	102.3	117.0	158.1	164.3	114.0	102.3	90.0	102.3	1,397.7
Mean daily sunshine hours	4.3	4.2	3.5	2.9	3.3	3.9	5.1	5.3	3.8	3.3	3.0	3.3	3.8
Source: Instituto de Hidrologia Meteorologia y Estudios Ambientales
