= Camilo Gómez =

Colombian cyclist

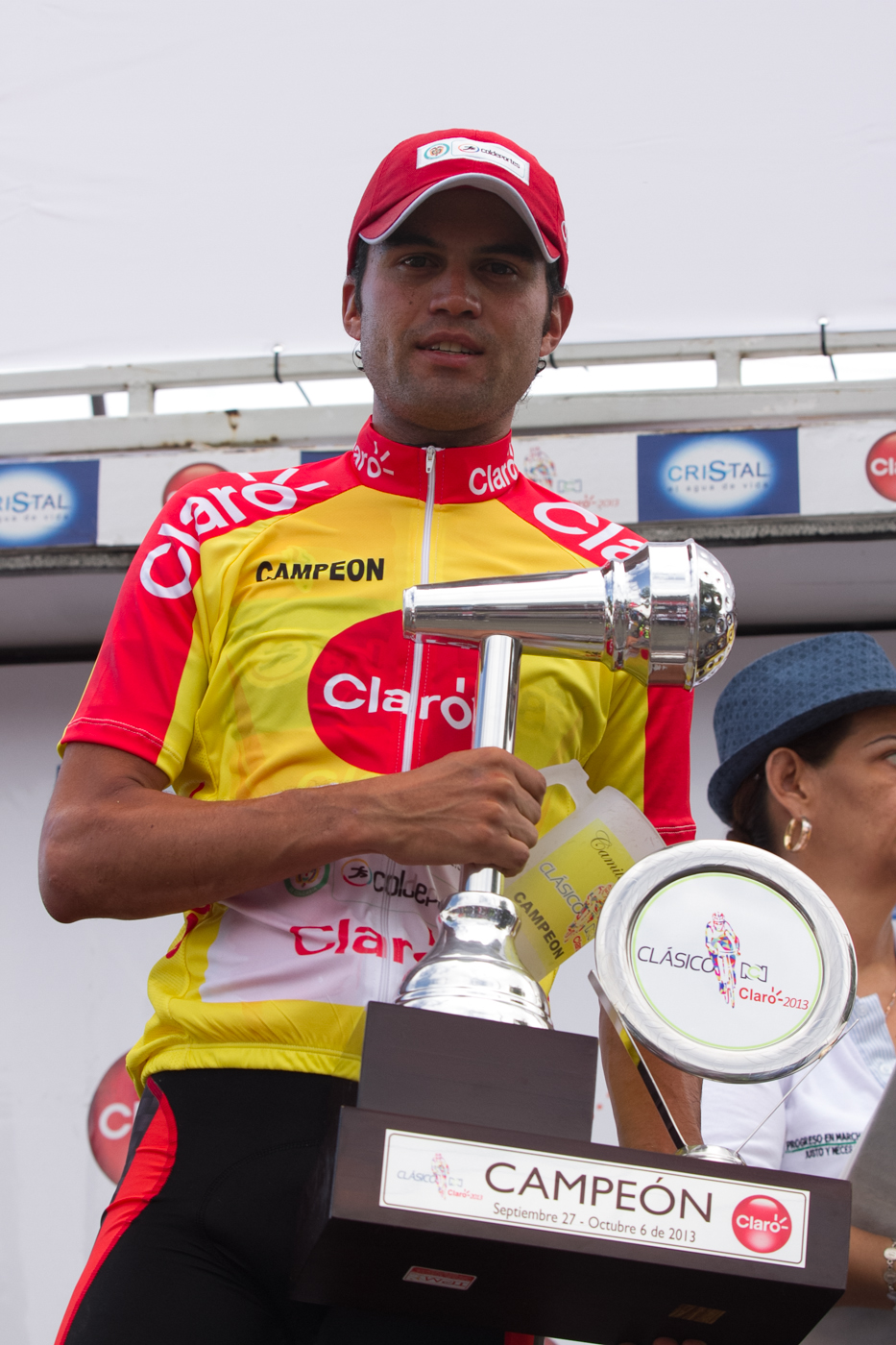
- Gómez in 2013

Personal information
- Full name: Camilo Andrés Gómez Archila
- Born: 5 October 1984 (age 42) Sogamoso, Boyacá, Colombia

Cycling career
- Sport: Cycling
- Discipline: Road
- Role: Rider
- Rider type: All-Rounder

Amateur teams
- 2007–2008: EBSA–Coordinadora
- 2010–2011: GW–Shimano
- 2014: Formesan–Bogotá Humana
- 2015–2016: Coldeportes–Claro

Professional teams
- 2012–2013: Coldeportes–Comcel
- 2017: Bicicletas Strongman
- 2018: EPM

Major wins
- Clásico RCN (2013)

Camilo Andrés Gómez Archila (born 5 October 1984 in Sogamoso, Boyacá) is a Colombian former professional road racing cyclist.

== Major results ==
2003
1st Stage 1 Vuelta a Colombia Under-23
2005
10th Overall Clásico RCN
2007
3rd Overall Clasica del Meta

1st Stage 1

2010
1st Prologue (TTT) Vuelta al Valle del Cauca
2011
1st Stage 1 (TTT) Vuelta a Antioquia
4th Overall Vuelta Ciclista de Chile
9th Overall Tour de San Luis
9th Overall Vuelta a Colombia
2012
1st Stage 8 Clásico RCN
1st Stage 4 Vuelta a Boyacá
1st Stage 2 Vuelta a Cundinamarca
10th Overall Vuelta a Bolivia

1st Stage 3 (TTT)

2013
1st Overall Clásico RCN
3rd Overall Vuelta a Boyacá
2014
1st Overall Vuelta a Antioquia
1st Stage 1 Vuelta al Ecuador
2015
1st Stage 3 Clásico RCN
4th Overall Vuelta a Colombia

1st Stage 7

2016
9th Overall Vuelta a Colombia
