= La Florida, Nariño =

Coordinates: 1.30167°N 77.4106°W

- Municipality and town
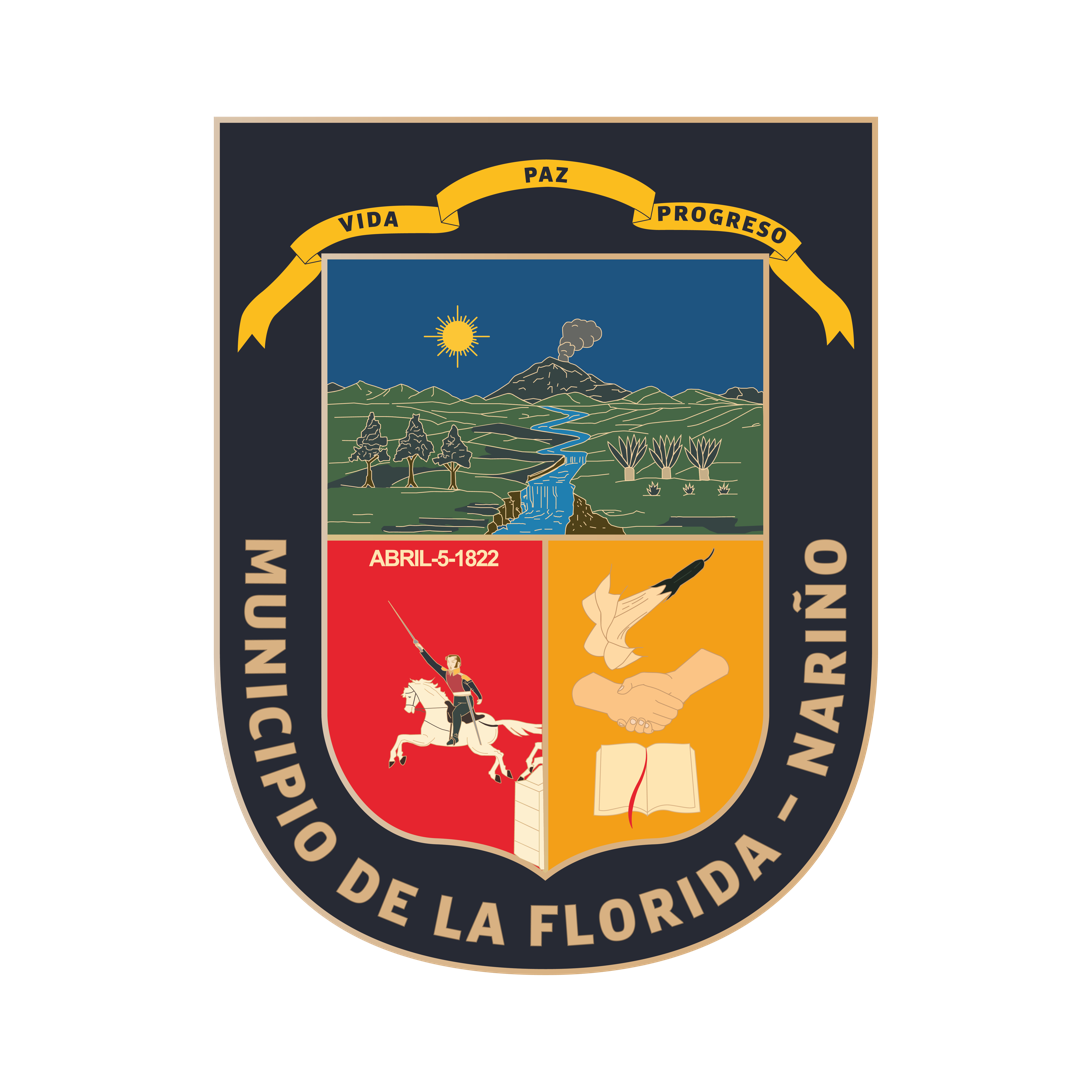
- Flag Coat of arms

- Location of the municipality and town of La Florida, Nariño in the Nariño Department of Colombia.
- Country: Colombia
- Department: Nariño Department

Area
  - Total: 139 km^{2} (54 sq mi)

Population (Census 2018)
  - Total: 9,047
  - Density: 65.1/km^{2} (169/sq mi)
- Time zone: UTC-5 (Colombia Standard Time)

La Florida (Spanish pronunciation: [la floˈɾiða]) is a town and municipality in the Nariño Department, Colombia.

The village of La Florida was founded on 11 November 1820 under the original name of Mombuco which means "small valley". It was founded by Juan Meneses and formed part of the dioceses of San Bartholome of Matituy. It was renamed in 1843 to the name of La Florida.
