= Jimena Florit =

Argentine cyclist

Personal information
- Born: May 18, 1972 (age 54) Olivos, Vicente López, Argentina
Medal record
Women's Mountain Bike
Representing Argentina
Pan American Games
Gold medal – first place	2003 Santo Domingo	Mountain bike
Bronze medal – third place	1999 Winnipeg	Mountain bike

Jimena Florit (born May 18, 1972) is a female cyclist from Argentina, specializing in competitive mountain biking.

Florit twice represented her native South American country at the Summer Olympics (2000 and 2004), where she finished in 20th and 12th place in the final rankings of the women's cross-country race. In 2003, she claimed the gold medal at the Pan American Games in Santo Domingo, Dominican Republic, defeating USA's Mary McConneloug (silver) and Chile's Francisca Campos (bronze).
