= Franklin López =

Nicaraguan footballer (born 1982)

Personal information
- Full name: Franklin Ulises López González
- Date of birth: August 16, 1982 (age 44)
- Place of birth: Jinotepe, Nicaragua
- Position: Midfielder

Team information
- Current team: Real Estelí
- Number: 27

Senior career*
Years	Team	Apps	(Gls)
2001–2003	Diriangén		
2003–2004	Parmalat		
2004–2007	Diriangén		
2007–present	Real Estelí		

International career^{‡}
2004–2009	Nicaragua	20	(1)
- * Club domestic league appearances and goals ‡ National team caps and goals as of 20 January 2014

Franklin Ulises López González (born 16 August 1982) is a Nicaraguan footballer who currently plays for Real Estelí in the Primera División de Nicaragua.

== Club career ==
He started his career at Diriangén and also played for Parmalat. In 2007 López moved to Real Estelí.

== International career ==
López made his debut for Nicaragua in a February 2004 friendly match against Haiti and has earned a total of 20 caps, scoring 1 goal1. He has represented his country in 3 FIFA World Cup qualification matches and played at the 2005, 2007, and 2009 UNCAF Nations Cups as well as at the 2009 CONCACAF Gold Cup.

His final international was a July 2009 CONCACAF Gold Cup against Panama.

=== International goals ===
Scores and results list Honduras' goal tally first.

N.	Date	Venue	Opponent	Score	Result	Competition
1.	4 June 2004	Campo de Fútbol, Quesada, Costa Rica	Costa Rica	1–0	1–5	Friendly match
