= Alejandro Ramírez (cyclist) =

Colombian racing cyclist

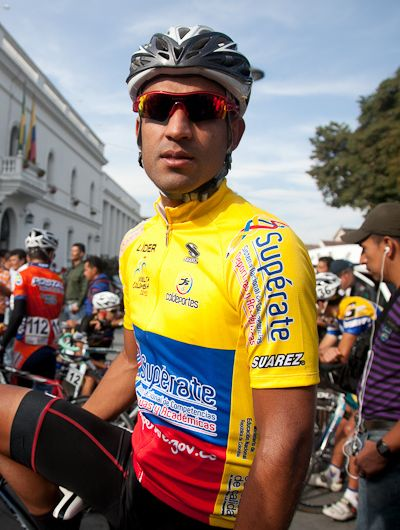
- Ramírez in 2012

Personal information
- Full name: Alejandro Ramírez Calderón
- Born: 15 August 1981 (age 45) La Ceja, Colombia

Cycling career
- Sport: Cycling
- Current team: Retired
- Discipline: Road
- Role: Rider

Amateur teams
- 2002: Aguardiente Antioqueño
- 2006: Orbitel–EPM
- 2008: UNE
- 2010: Indeportes Antioquia
- 2013–2014: Aguardiente Antioqueño–Lotería de Medellín–IDEA
- 2015–2016: Coldeportes–Claro

Professional teams
- 2007: UNE–Orbitel
- 2009: Colombia es Pasión–Coldeportes
- 2011–2012: Gobernación de Antioquia–Indeportes Antioquia
- 2017: Coldeportes–Zenú

Alejandro Ramírez Calderón (born August 15, 1981) is a Colombian former road racing cyclist.

== Major results ==
2002
1st Overall Vuelta a Colombia Sub-23

1st Stage 6

2003
2nd Overall Vuelta a Colombia Sub-23
2005
1st Stage 6 Clásico RCN
2006
1st Overall Doble Sucre Potosí GP Cemento Fancesa

1st Stage 1

1st Stage 3 Clasica International de Tulcan
2008
1st in Stage 1 Vuelta de Higuito
2012
2nd Overall Vuelta a Colombia
2013
7th Overall Vuelta a Colombia
