= Jairo Pérez (cyclist) =

Colombian cyclist (born 1973)

Personal information
- Full name: Jairo Pérez Suárez
- Born: March 24, 1973 (age 53) Iza, Boyacá
Medal record
Men's track cycling
Representing Colombia
Pan American Games
Silver medal – second place	2007 Rio de Janeiro	Team Pursuit
Central American and Caribbean Games
Gold medal – first place	2006 Cartagena	Team Pursuit
Silver medal – second place	2006 Cartagena	Individual Pursuit

Jairo Pérez Suárez (born March 24, 1973, in Iza, Boyacá) is a male professional track and road cyclist from Colombia. He won a silver medal for his native country at the 2007 Pan American Games in Rio de Janeiro, Brazil alongside Carlos Alzate, Arles Castro and Juan Pablo Forero in the Men's Track Team Pursuit. He competed at the 2008 Summer Olympics in Beijing, PR China.

== Career ==
1998
1st in Stage 1 Vuelta a Colombia, Circuito del Llano (COL)
1st in Stage 7 Vuelta a Colombia, Alto de Santa Helena (COL)
1999
1st in Stage 10 Vuelta a Colombia, Barrancabermeja (COL)
1st in Stage 2 Clásico RCN, Tocancipá (COL)
2000
1st in Stage 11 Vuelta al Táchira, Bramón (VEN)
1st in Stage 9 Vuelta a Colombia, Manizales (COL)
1st in Stage 14 Vuelta a Colombia, Villa de Leyva (COL)
2001
1st in Stage 6 Clásico RCN, Villa de Leyva (COL)
1st in Stage 6 Vuelta a Venezuela, Calabozo circuit (VEN)
3rd in General Classification Vuelta a Venezuela (VEN)
1st in General Classification Doble Copacabana GP Fides (BOL)
1st in Stage 2 Doble Copacabana GP Fides, Viacha (BOL)
2002
1st in Stage 6 Vuelta a Colombia, Bogota (COL)
2003
1st in Tuta (COL)
3rd in Colombia National Championships, Track, Pursuit, Colombia, Duitama (COL)
2004
1st in Stage 3 Vuelta al Tolima, Coello (COL)
1st in Stage 1 Vuelta a Antioquia, Jardin (COL)
1st in Stage 3 Vuelta a Antioquia, Sabaneta (COL)
1st in Stage 6 part a Doble Copacabana GP Fides, San Pedro De Tiquina (BOL)
1st in Prologue Vuelta a Costa Rica, Velódromo Nacional del Parque de La Paz (CRC)
1st in Stage 2 Vuelta a Costa Rica, Circuito Interdistrital en San Carlos (CRC)
1st in Stage 4 Vuelta a Costa Rica, Playas del Coco (CRC)
2005
1st in Tuta (COL)
3rd in Colombia National Championships, Track, Points Race, Colombia (COL)
1st in Stage 1 Clasica del Meta (COL)
2nd in General Classification Clasica del Meta (COL)
2006
2nd in Tuta (COL)
1st in Stage 4 Vuelta al Valle del Cauca (COL)
1st in Stage 8 part b Vuelta a la Independencia Nacional, Santo Domingo (DOM)
1st in General Classification Vuelta a la Independencia Nacional (DOM)
2007
(gold) in Pan American Championships, Track, Team Pursuit, Valencia (VEN)

alongside Juan Pablo Forero, Arles Castro, and Carlos Alzate

(silver) in Pan American Games, Track, Team Pursuit, Rio de Janeiro (BRA)

alongside Juan Pablo Forero, Arles Castro, and Carlos Alzate

1st in Stage 5 Vuelta a Colombia, La Vega (COL)
2008
1st in Stage 4 Vuelta al Tolima, Ibagué (COL)
1st in Stage 6 International Cycling Classic, Bensenville (USA)
1st in Stage 17 International Cycling Classic, Whitefish Bay (USA)
