= Miguel Ángel Sanabria =

Colombian cyclist

Miguel Ángel Sanabria Acevedo (September 20, 1967 – October 7, 2006) was a male road cyclist from Colombia, who was a professional from 1990 to 1998. He was born in Tuta, Boyacá, and nicknamed "El Ratón" during his career.

== Career ==
1992
1st in Stage 9 Vuelta al Tachira (VEN)
1995
1st in Stage 6 Vuelta a Colombia, Chinchina (COL)
1st in General Mountains Classification Vuelta a Colombia (COL)
1996
1st in Stage 6 Vuelta a Colombia, Villamaría (COL)
1st in General Classification Vuelta a Colombia (COL)
1997
1st in Stage 4 Vuelta a Cundinamarca (COL)
1998
1st in Stage 1 GP Mundo Ciclistico (COL)
1st in General Classification GP Mundo Ciclistico (COL)
1999
1st in Stage 12 Vuelta a Colombia (COL)
2002
1st in General Classification Vuelta a Cundinamarca (COL)
1st in Stage 4 Clasica Alcaldía de Pasca, Pasca (COL)
2004
1st in Stage 1 Vuelta a Boyacà, Sáchica (COL)
1st in Stage 13 Vuelta a Colombia, Bogotá (COL)
1st in Stage 14 Vuelta a Colombia, Bogota (COL)
2005
1st in Stage 2 Clásica Ciudad de Girardot, Cunday (COL)
