= Edwin Orozco =

Colombian cyclist

Personal information
- Born: 17 July 1982 (age 44) La Unión, Antioquia, Colombia

Cycling career
- Sport: Cycling
- Discipline: Road racing
- Role: Rider

Edwin Armando Orozco Toro (born 17 July 1982 in La Unión, Antioquia) is a male professional road racing cyclist from Colombia.

== Career ==
2002
1st in Stage 2 Vuelta a Colombia Sub-23, Riosucio (COL)
2004
1st in General Classification Clàsica Gobernacion de Casanare (COL)
2005
1st in Stage 2 Vuelta a Boyacà, Tuta (COL)
2009
1st in Prologue Vuelta a Colombia, Team Time Trial, Bogotá (COL)
1st in Stage 2 Clasica Marinilla, Marinilla (COL)
2nd in General Classification Clasica Marinilla (COL)
3rd in General Classification Clásica Nacional Marco Fidel Suárez (COL)
5th in General Classification Vuelta a Santander (b) (COL)
