= Mary McConneloug =

American racing cyclist (born 1971)

Personal information
- Full name: Mary McConneloug
- Nickname: Mary Mac
- Born: June 24, 1971 (age 55) San Francisco, California, United States

Cycling career
- Sport: Cycling
- Current team: Team KENDA Global MTB
- Disciplines: Mountain bike racing; Cross country; Cyclocross; Marathon; Off road Stage races; Enduro MTB
- Role: Rider, team chef and logistical coordinator
- Rider type: Cross-country; Cyclocross; Marathon; Off road Stage races; Enduro MTB

Professional teams
- 1999-?: Team KENDA/Seven/NoTubes
- ?-?: Kenda/Stans NoTubes
- ?-?: Kenda/Intense
- ?-current: Kenda Global MTB

Major wins
- USA Cross Country Mountain Bike National Champion 2003, 2005, 2007, 2008; Pan American (Continental) Champion (Mexico 2005, Brasil 2006, Venezuela 2008, Argentina 2013); 9 x winners of Trans Andes Challenge Stage race mixed category with husband Michael Broderick; New England Cyclocross Champion (2009, 2012); 2017 Masters Women Enduro MTB World Champion
Medal record
Representing the United States
Women's Mountain bike racing
Pan American Games
Silver medal – second place	2003 Santo Domingo	Cross-Country
Silver medal – second place	2007 Rio de Janeiro	Cross-Country

Mary McConneloug (born June 24, 1971) is a racing cyclist from the United States, specializing in competitive mountain biking. She is a four time USA Cross Country Mountain Bike National Champion having captured the title in 2003, 2005, 2007, 2008.

McConneloug graduated from Santa Clara University in 1993 with a Bachelor of Music degree in Vocal Performance.

McConneloug twice represented her native country at the Summer Olympics (2004 and 2008), where she finished in 9th and 7th place respectively in the final rankings of the women's cross-country race. In 2003, she claimed the silver medal at the Pan American Games in Santo Domingo, Dominican Republic, behind Argentina's Jimena Florit.

After nearly 15 years of international competition in cross country racing, and representing USA Cycling National Team for 13 years, Mary and her long-time teammate and husband Mike Briderick turned their focus to Enduro MTB racing, following the Enduro World Series as Master's (40+) athletes.
