= 2001 Clásico RCN =

Race details
- Dates: August 12 – August 19
- Stages: 8
- Distance: 1,031 km (640.6 mi)
- Winning time: 29h 11' 40"

Results
| | Winner | Juan Diego Ramírez (COL) | (05 Orbitel) |
| | Second | José Castelblanco (COL) | (Selle Italia) |
| | Third | Elder Herrera (COL) | (05 Orbitel) |
| | Mountains | José Castelblanco (COL) | (Selle Italia) |
| | Youth | Franklin Chacón (VEN) | (Lotería del Táchira) |
| | Combination | Juan Diego Ramírez (COL) | (05 Orbitel) |
| | Sprints | Heberth Gutiérrez (COL) | (Selle Italia) |
| | Team | 05 Orbitel | |

The 41st edition of the annual Clásico RCN was held from August 12 to August 19, 2001 in Colombia. The stage race with a UCI rate of 2.4 started in Medellín and finished in Parque Nacional Circuito. RCN stands for "Radio Cadena Nacional" one of the oldest and largest radio networks in the nation.

== Stages ==
=== 2001-08-12: Medellín–Jericó (124 km) ===
| Place | Stage 1 | | General Classification | |
| Place | Name | Time | Name | Time |
|---|---|---|---|---|
| 1. | Alejandro Cortés (COL) | 03:45.26 | Alejandro Cortés (COL) | 03:45.16 |
| 2. | Juan Diego Ramírez (COL) | + 0.03 | Juan Diego Ramírez (COL) | + 0.07 |
| 3. | Álvaro Lozano (COL) | + 0.03 | Álvaro Lozano (COL) | + 0.07 |

=== 2001-08-13: Jericó–Manizales (164.4 km) ===
| Place | Stage 2 | | General Classification | |
| Place | Name | Time | Name | Time |
|---|---|---|---|---|
| 1. | José Castelblanco (COL) | 04:34.36 | Álvaro Lozano (COL) | 08:20.05 |
| 2. | Álvaro Lozano (COL) | + 0.16 | Juan Diego Ramírez (COL) | + 0.05 |
| 3. | Juan Diego Ramírez (COL) | + 0.19 | Ismael Sarmiento (COL) | + 1.35 |

=== 2001-08-14: Manizales–Anserma (122.2 km) ===
| Place | Stage 3 | | General Classification | |
| Place | Name | Time | Name | Time |
|---|---|---|---|---|
| 1. | Heberth Gutiérrez (COL) | 03:06.52 | Juan Diego Ramírez (COL) | 11:35.01 |
| 2. | Jairo Hernández (COL) | + 0.13 | Álvaro Lozano (COL) | + 0.13 |
| 3. | Alexis Rojas (COL) | + 0.23 | José Castelblanco (COL) | + 2.09 |

=== 2001-08-15: Alcalá–Ibagué (155.7 km) ===
| Place | Stage 4 | | General Classification | |
| Place | Name | Time | Name | Time |
|---|---|---|---|---|
| 1. | Juan Diego Ramírez (COL) | 04:32.58 | Juan Diego Ramírez (COL) | 16:07.49 |
| 2. | José Castelblanco (COL) | + 0.41 | José Castelblanco (COL) | + 2.54 |
| 3. | Elder Herrera (COL) | + 1.10 | Elder Herrera (COL) | + 8.56 |

=== 2001-08-16: Ibagué–Mosquera (181.3 km) ===
| Place | Stage 5 | | General Classification | |
| Place | Name | Time | Name | Time |
|---|---|---|---|---|
| 1. | Ubaldo Mesa (COL) | 05:14.07 | Juan Diego Ramírez (COL) | 21:21.41 |
| 2. | Víctor Niño (COL) | + 0.02 | José Castelblanco (COL) | + 2.50 |
| 3. | José Castelblanco (COL) | + 0.15 | Elder Herrera (COL) | + 12.34 |

=== 2001-08-17: Sopó–Villa de Leyva (143.8 km) ===
| Place | Stage 6 | | General Classification | |
| Place | Name | Time | Name | Time |
|---|---|---|---|---|
| 1. | Jairo Pérez (COL) | 03:34.45 | Juan Diego Ramírez (COL) | 25:04.47 |
| 2. | Libardo Niño (COL) | — | José Castelblanco (COL) | + 3.51 |
| 3. | Juan Diego Ramírez (COL) | + 8.25 | Elder Herrera (COL) | + 12.38 |

=== 2001-08-18: Villa de Leyva–Tunja (37.6 km) ===
| Place | Stage 7 (Individual Time Trial) | | General Classification | |
| Place | Name | Time | Name | Time |
|---|---|---|---|---|
| 1. | José Castelblanco (COL) | 01:09.42 | Juan Diego Ramírez (COL) | 26:15.49 |
| 2. | Elder Herrera (COL) | + 0.27 | José Castelblanco (COL) | + 2.31 |
| 3. | Jairo Hernández (COL) | + 1.16 | Elder Herrera (COL) | + 11.44 |

=== 2001-08-19: Circuito Parque Nacional de Bogotá (102 km) ===
| Place | Stage 8 | | General Classification | |
| Place | Name | Time | Name | Time |
|---|---|---|---|---|
| 1. | Fredy González (COL) | 02:49.18 | Juan Diego Ramírez (COL) | 29:11.40 |
| 2. | Libardo Niño (COL) | — | José Castelblanco (COL) | + 2.31 |
| 3. | Nélson Vargas (COL) | + 5.40 | Elder Herrera (COL) | + 11.44 |

== Final classification ==
| RANK | NAME | TEAM | TIME |
|---|---|---|---|
| 1. | Juan Diego Ramírez (COL) | 05 Orbitel | 29:11:40 |
| 2. | José Castelblanco (COL) | Baterías MAC-Selle Italia-Pacific | + 2.31 |
| 3. | Elder Herrera (COL) | 05 Orbitel | + 11.44 |
| 4. | Marlon Pérez (COL) | 05 Orbitel | + 14.11 |
| 5. | Jairo Hernández (COL) | 05 Orbitel | + 15.19 |
| 6. | Ismael Sarmiento (COL) | Lotería de Boyacá | + 19.47 |
| 7. | Víctor Niño (COL) | Lotería de Boyacá | + 20.30 |
| 8. | Hernán Bonilla (COL) | 05 Orbitel | + 26.11 |
| 9. | Miguel Ángel Sanabria (COL) | 05 Orbitel | + 32.08 |
| 10. | Javier Zapata (COL) | 05 Orbitel | + 35.44 |

== Teams ==
05 Orbitel

1. (Colombia) Juan Diego Ramírez
2. (Colombia) Jairo Hernández
3. (Colombia) Marlon Pérez
4. (Colombia) Elder Herrera
5. (Colombia) Javier Zapata
6. (Colombia) Miguel Ángel Sanabria
7. (Colombia) Julio César Aguirre
8. (Colombia) Daniel Rincón
9. (Colombia) Hernán Bonilla
10. (Colombia) Luis Castañeda

Lotería de Boyacá

11. (Colombia) Urbelino Mesa
12. (Colombia) Israel Ochoa
13. (Colombia) Álvaro Sierra
14. (Colombia) Jairo Pérez
15. (Colombia) Jair Bernal
16. (Colombia) Libardo Niño
17. (Colombia) Graciano Fonseca
18. (Colombia) José Ibáñez
19. (Colombia) Ismael Sarmiento
20. (Colombia) Víctor Niño

Baterías MAC-Selle Italia-Pacific

21. (Colombia) José Castelblanco
22. (Colombia) Hernán Buenahora
23. (Colombia) Carlos Alberto Contreras
24. (Colombia) Fredy González
25. (Colombia) Álvaro Lozano
26. (Colombia) Julio Ernesto Bernal
27. (Colombia) Vladimir González
28. (Colombia) Fidel Chacón
29. (Colombia) Jhon García
30. (Colombia) Heberth Gutiérrez

Aguardiente Antioqueño-Empresas Públicas de Medellín

31. (Colombia) Héctor Castaño
32. (Colombia) Héctor Palacio
33. (Colombia) Dubán Ramírez
34. (Colombia) Argiro Zapata
35. (Colombia) Germán Ospina
36. (Colombia) Jorge Humberto Martínez
37. (Colombia) Nélson Vargas
38. (Colombia) Ariel Martínez
39. (Colombia) Ramón García
40. (Colombia) Oscar Álvarez

Lotería del Táchira (Venezuela)

41. (Venezuela) Noel Vasquez
42. (Colombia) César Salazar
43. (Venezuela) Carlos Maya
44. (Venezuela) Omar Pumar
45. (Venezuela) Alexis Méndez
46. (Venezuela) Pastor Linares
47. (Venezuela) José Chacón Díaz
48. (Venezuela) Yeison Delgado

Aguardiente Cristal

51. (Colombia) Alejandro Cortés
52. (Colombia) Ferney Naranjo
53. (Colombia) Julio César Rangel
54. (Colombia) Ricardo Vargas
55. (Colombia) Darío Cedano
56. (Colombia) Óscar Alarcón
57. (Colombia) Javier Castiblanco
58. (Colombia) Juan Botero

Casanare Inderca

61. (Colombia) William Guerrero
62. (Colombia) Víctor Becerra
63. (Colombia) Miller Suárez
64. (Colombia) Miguel Ángel Niño
65. (Colombia) Osman Rivera
66. (Colombia) Giovanny Huertas
67. (Colombia) Wilson Parra
68. (Colombia) Juan Carlos Sierra
69. (Colombia) Camilo Bernal
70. (Colombia) Anselmo Barrera

Sorteo Extraordinario de Navidad-Aguardiente Néctar

71. (Colombia) Alexis Rojas
72. (Colombia) Raúl Montaña
73. (Colombia) Gregorio Ladino
74. (Colombia) Javier Guerrero
75. (Colombia) José Luis Vanegas
76. (Colombia) Juan Fonseca
77. (Colombia) Edward Ruiz
78. (Colombia) Víctor Hugo González
79. (Colombia) Rigoberto Ibáñez
80. (Colombia) Ubaldo Mesa

Nacional 05 Orbitel

81. (Colombia) Johnny Leal
82. (Colombia) Carlos Osorio
83. (Colombia) Jorge Iván González
84. (Colombia) Javier Alberto González
85. (Colombia) Olmedo Capacho

Idea-Indeportes Antioquia

91. (Colombia) Oved Ramírez
92. (Colombia) Edilberto Suárez
93. (Colombia) César Laverde
94. (Colombia) Jorge Eliécer
95. (Colombia) José Diego Marín

Club Cicloases - Los Panches

95. (Colombia) Eduardo García
96. (Colombia) Alexander Rodríguez
97. (Colombia) Gerson Sánchez
98. (Colombia) Hildebrando Rodríguez
99. (Colombia) Hernando Leal
100. (Colombia) Javier Ravelo
101. (Colombia) Miller López
102. (Colombia) Fermin Linares
103. (Colombia) William Jetial
104. (Colombia) Jeison Lasso

Cicloases

111. (Colombia) Marceliano Farfán
112. (Colombia) Freddy Rincón
113. (Colombia) Jairo Vega
114. (Colombia) Juan Barrero

Mixto

121. (Colombia) Javier Anaya
122. (Colombia) Hernando Hernández
123. (Colombia) Gustavo Guzmán
124. (Colombia) Héctor Reina

== See also ==
- 2001 Vuelta a Colombia
