= 2001 Vuelta a Colombia =

Race details
- Dates: June 17 – July 2, 2001
- Stages: 15
- Distance: 1,946.3 km (1,209.4 mi)
- Winning time: 46h 51' 29"

Results
	Winner	Hernán Buenahora (COL)	(Selle Italia-Baterías Mac)
	Second	Juan Diego Ramírez (COL)	(05 Orbitel)
	Third	Jairo Hernández (COL)	(05 Orbitel)
	Points	Marlon Pérez (COL)	(05 Orbitel)
	Mountains	Víctor Niño (COL)	(Lotería de Boyacá)
	Youth	Johnny Leal (COL)	(05 Orbitel)
	Combination	Hernán Buenahora (COL)	(Selle Italia-Baterías Mac)
	Sprints	Gregorio Ladino (COL)	(Aguardiente Néctar)
	Team	05 Orbitel	

The 51st edition of the Vuelta a Colombia was held from June 17 to July 2, 2001. There were a total number of 98 competitors from 13 teams.

== Stages ==
=== 2001-06-17: Ciudad de Popayán (8.8 km) ===
Place	Prologue		General Classification	
Place	Name	Time	Name	Time
1.	Marlon Pérez (COL)	00:08.51	Marlon Pérez (COL)	00:08.51
2.	Ismael Sarmiento (COL)	+0.17	Ismael Sarmiento (COL)	+0.17
3.	Javier Zapata (COL)	+0.21	Javier Zapata (COL)	+0.21

=== 2001-06-18: Popayán — Cali (143 km) ===
Place	Stage 1		General Classification	
Place	Name	Time	Name	Time
1.	Marlon Pérez (COL)	03:00.48	Marlon Pérez (COL)	03:09.29
2.	Víctor Herrera (COL)	—	Ismael Sarmiento (COL)	+0.27
3.	Luis Orán Castañeda (COL)	—	Javier Zapata (COL)	+0.27

=== 2001-06-19: Palmira — Buga (46.7 km) ===
Place	Stage 2 (Team Time Trial)		General Classification	
Place	Name	Time	Name	Time
1.	05 Orbitel A	00:51.02	Marlon Pérez (COL)	03:08.29
2.	Lotería de Boyacá A	+0.35	Javier Zapata (COL)	+0.27
3.	Lotería de Boyacá B	+1.09	Ismael Sarmiento (COL)	+0.36

=== 2001-06-20: Buga — Cartago (120 km) ===
Place	Stage 3		General Classification	
Place	Name	Time	Name	Time
1.	Gregorio Ladino (COL)	02:23.14	Marlon Pérez (COL)	05:31.44
2.	Marlon Pérez (COL)	+0.07	Javier Zapata (COL)	+0.33
3.	Víctor Herrera (COL)	—	Ismael Sarmiento (COL)	+0.43

=== 2001-06-21: Cartago — Pereira (176 km) ===
Place	Stage 4		General Classification	
Place	Name	Time	Name	Time
1.	Yeison Delgado (VEN)	04:16.11	Marlon Pérez (COL)	09:48.05
2.	Israel Ochoa (COL)	+0.14	Javier Zapata (COL)	+0.37
3.	Marlon Pérez (COL)	—	Ismael Sarmiento (COL)	+0.47

=== 2001-06-22: Pereira — Chinchiná (27.7 km) ===
Place	Stage 5 (Individual Time Trial)		General Classification	
Place	Name	Time	Name	Time
1.	Javier Zapata (COL)	00:38.13	Marlon Pérez (COL)	10:26.19
2.	Marlon Pérez (COL)	+0.01	Javier Zapata (COL)	+0.36
3.	Libardo Niño (COL)	+0.06	Libardo Niño (COL)	+1.05

=== 2001-06-23: Chinchiná — Medellín (191 km) ===
Place	Stage 6		General Classification	
Place	Name	Time	Name	Time
1.	Hernán Buenahora (COL)	04:41.58	Marlon Pérez (COL)	15:08.35
2.	Héctor Palacio (COL)	+0.22	Javier Zapata (COL)	+0.41
3.	Marlon Pérez (COL)	—	Libardo Niño (COL)	+1.10

=== 2001-06-24: Medellín — El Escobero (129 km) ===
Place	Stage 7		General Classification	
Place	Name	Time	Name	Time
1.	Hernán Buenahora (COL)	??????	Javier Zapata (COL)	18:46.06
2.	Héctor Castaño (COL)	+0.25	Hernán Buenahora (COL)	+0.13
3.	Noel Vasquez (VEN)	+0.59	Ismael Sarmiento (COL)	+1.14

=== 2001-06-25: Caldas — Manizales (182.5 km) ===
Place	Stage 8		General Classification	
Place	Name	Time	Name	Time
1.	Jairo Hernández (COL)	04:49.08	Javier Zapata (COL)	23:36.21
2.	Marlon Pérez (COL)	+0.01	Hernán Buenahora (COL)	+0.13
3.	Rodolfo Camacho (COL)	+0.02	Ismael Sarmiento (COL)	+1.14

=== 2001-06-26: Manizales — Honda (140.8 km) ===
Place	Stage 9		General Classification	
Place	Name	Time	Name	Time
1.	Hernán Buenahora (COL)	03:23.54	Hernán Buenahora (COL)	27:00.19
2.	Juan Diego Ramírez (COL)	+2.13	Javier Zapata (COL)	+2.08
3.	Javier Zapata (COL)	—	Juan Diego Ramírez (COL)	+3.37

=== 2001-06-27: Puerto Boyacá — Barrancabermeja (203.5 km) ===
Place	Stage 10		General Classification	
Place	Name	Time	Name	Time
1.	Libardo Niño (COL)	04:12.52	Hernán Buenahora (COL)	31:20.25
2.	Carlos Osorio (COL)	+0.04	Javier Zapata (COL)	+2.08
3.	Marlon Pérez (COL)	+7.09	Juan Diego Ramírez (COL)	+3.37

=== 2001-06-28: Barrancabermeja — Bucaramanga (124.3 km) ===
Place	Stage 11		General Classification	
Place	Name	Time	Name	Time
1.	Federico Muñoz (COL)	03:05.30	Hernán Buenahora (COL)	34:25.55
2.	Israel Ochoa (COL)	—	Juan Diego Ramírez (COL)	+3.37
3.	Héctor Palacio (COL)	—	Jairo Hernández (COL)	+4.58

=== 2001-06-29: Bucaramanga — Socorro (123 km) ===
Place	Stage 12		General Classification	
Place	Name	Time	Name	Time
1.	Olmedo Capacho (COL)	02:59.32	Hernán Buenahora (COL)	37:30.22
2.	Nélson Vargas (COL)	+3.04	Juan Diego Ramírez (COL)	+3.43
3.	Víctor Hugo González (COL)	+3.05	Jairo Hernández (COL)	+4.58

=== 2001-06-30: Socorro — Tunja (169.4 km) ===
Place	Stage 13		General Classification	
Place	Name	Time	Name	Time
1.	Graciano Fonseca (COL)	04:41.42	Hernán Buenahora (COL)	42:16.44
2.	Víctor Niño (COL)	—	Juan Diego Ramírez (COL)	+3.37
3.	Alejandro Cortés (COL)	+4.11	Jairo Hernández (COL)	+4.58

=== 2001-07-01: Tunja — Bogotá (163 km) ===
Place	Stage 14		General Classification	
Place	Name	Time	Name	Time
1.	Darío Sedano (COL)	03:55.11	Hernán Buenahora (COL)	46:15.33
2.	Jorge Humberto Martínez (COL)	+0.05	Juan Diego Ramírez (COL)	+3.43
3.	Rigoberto Ibáñez (COL)	—	Jairo Hernández (COL)	+4.58

=== 2001-07-02: Bogotá — Alto de Patios (23.5 km) ===
Place	Stage 15 (Individual Time Trial)		General Classification	
Place	Name	Time	Name	Time
1.	Hernán Buenahora (COL)	00:35.56	Hernán Buenahora (COL)	46:51.29
2.	Juan Diego Ramírez (COL)	center>+0.59	Juan Diego Ramírez (COL)	+4.42
3.	Raúl Montaña (COL)	+1.17	Jairo Hernández (COL)	+6.55

== Final classification ==
RANK	NAME	TEAM	TIME
1.	Hernán Buenahora (COL)	Selle Italia Baterías MAC	46:51:29
2.	Juan Diego Ramírez (COL)	05 Orbitel	+ 4.42
3.	Jairo Hernández (COL)	05 Orbitel	+ 6.55
4.	Héctor Castaño (COL)	Empresas Públicas Medellín	+ 6.59
5.	Noel Vasquez (VEN)	Lotería del Táchira	+ 8.02
6.	Alexis Rojas (COL)	Aguardiente Néctar	+ 10.48
7.	Ubaldo Mesa (COL)	Lotería de Boyacá	+ 12.13
8.	Israel Ochoa (COL)	Lotería de Boyacá	+ 13.27
9.	Ismael Sarmiento (COL)	Lotería de Boyacá	+ 14.11
10.	Marlon Pérez (COL)	05 Orbitel	+ 16.46

== Teams ==
Empresas Públicas de Medellín — Aguardiente Antioqueño

- Director Deportivo: Luis Carlos Mejía
1. (Colombia) Héctor Palacio
2. (Colombia) Héctor Castaño
3. (Colombia) Argiro Zapata
4. (Colombia) Dubán Ramírez
5. (Colombia) Nélson Vargas
6. (Colombia) Germán Ospina
7. (Colombia) Ariel Martínez
8. (Colombia) Jorge Humberto Martínez

Aguardiente Néctar — Cartoprin

- Director Deportivo: José Alfonso López
11. (Colombia) Raúl Montaña
12. (Colombia) Víctor Hugo González
13. (Colombia) José Vanegas
14. (Colombia) Víctor Herrera
15. (Colombia) Alexis Rojas
16. (Colombia) Gregorio Ladino
17. (Colombia) Edward Ruiz
18. (Colombia) Rigoberto Ibáñez

Baterías MAC — Selle Italia — Pacific

- Director Deportivo: Hernán Herrón
21. (Colombia) José Castelblanco
22. (Colombia) Hernán Buenahora
23. (Colombia) Carlos Alberto Contreras
24. (Colombia) Álvaro Lozano
25. (Colombia) Julio Ernesto Bernal
26. (Colombia) Vladimir González
27. (Colombia) Jhon García
28. (Colombia) Heberth Gutiérrez

Lotería de Boyacá A

- Director Deportivo: Rafael Antonio Niño
31. (Colombia) Álvaro Sierra
32. (Colombia) Israel Ochoa
33. (Colombia) Libardo Niño
34. (Colombia) Urbelino Mesa
35. (Colombia) Ismael Sarmiento
36. (Colombia) Jair Bernal
37. (Colombia) Ángel Camargo
38. (Colombia) Jairo Pérez

05 Orbitel A

- Director Deportivo: José Raúl Mesa
41. (Colombia) Juan Diego Ramírez
42. (Colombia) Marlon Pérez
43. (Colombia) Jairo Hernández
44. (Colombia) Luis Castañeda
45. (Colombia) Javier Zapata
46. (Colombia) Elder Herrera
47. (Colombia) Julio César Aguirre
48. (Colombia) Hernán Bonilla

Lotería del Táchira (Venezuela)

- Director Deportivo: Guillermo Cárdenas
51. (Venezuela) Noel Vasquez
52. (Colombia) César Salazar
53. (Venezuela) Carlos Maya
54. (Venezuela) Omar Pumar
55. (Venezuela) Alexis Méndez
56. (Venezuela) Pastor Linares
57. (Venezuela) José Chacón Díaz
58. (Venezuela) Yeison Delgado

Aguardiente Cristal — Liciclismo Caldas

- Director Deportivo: Rubén Darío Beltrán
61. (Colombia) Ferney Naranjo
62. (Colombia) Alejandro Cortés
63. (Colombia) Ricardo Vargas
64. (Colombia) Julio César Rangel
65. (Colombia) John Freddy Rubio
66. (Colombia) Oscar Alarcón
67. (Colombia) Darío Sedano

Idea — Indeportes Antioquia

- Director Deportivo: Luis Fernando Otálvaro
71. (Colombia) Oved Ramírez
72. (Colombia) Edilberto Suárez
73. (Colombia) Oscar Álvarez
74. (Colombia) Ramón García
75. (Colombia) César Laverde
76. (Colombia) Jorge Flórez

Lotería de Boyacá B

- Director Deportivo: José Patrocinio Jiménez
81. (Colombia) Víctor Niño
82. (Colombia) Ubaldo Mesa
83. (Colombia) José Ibáñez
84. (Colombia) Giovanny Huertas
85. (Colombia) Elkin Barrera
86. (Colombia) Víctor Becerra
87. (Colombia) Giovanny Torres
88. (Colombia) Graciano Fonseca

05 Orbitel B

- Técnico Adjunto: Carlos Jaramillo
91. (Colombia) Miguel Ángel Sanabria
92. (Colombia) Daniel Rincón
93. (Colombia) Jorge Iván González
94. (Colombia) Carlos Osorio
95. (Colombia) Olmedo Capacho
96. (Colombia) Javier Alberto González
97. (Colombia) Johnny Leal

Triple Gordo de Trujillo (Venezuela)

- Director Deportivo: José Lindarte and Jaime Díaz
101. (Colombia) Federico Muñoz
102. (Colombia) Luis Espinosa
103. (Venezuela) Tomy Linares
104. (Venezuela) José Alirio Contreras
105. (Colombia) Raúl Gómez Suárez
106. (Colombia) Freddy Moncada
107. (Venezuela) Carlos José Ochoa
108. (Colombia) Rodolfo Camacho

Cicloases Cundinamarca

- Director Deportivo: Leonidas Herrera
111. (Colombia) Alexander Rodríguez
112. (Colombia) Guillermo Chaparro
113. (Colombia) Maximiliano Farfán
114. (Colombia) José Javier Castiblanco
115. (Colombia) Freddy Rincón
116. (Colombia) Juan Barrero
117. (Colombia) Gerson Sánchez
118. (Colombia) Jairo Vega

Mixto 1

121. (Colombia) Javier Guerrero
122. (Colombia) Javier Torres
123. (Colombia) Darío Sedano
124. (Colombia) Hernando Hernández
125. (Colombia) José Diego Marín
126. (Colombia) Gustavo Guzmán
127. (Colombia) Héctor Reina

== See also ==
- 2001 Clásico RCN
