= 2000 Vuelta a Colombia =

Race details
- Dates: June 11–26, 2000
- Stages: 16
- Distance: 2,310.8 km (1,435.9 mi)
- Winning time: 58h 51' 53"

Results
Jersey awarded to the overall winner	Winner	Héctor Palacio (COL)	(05 Orbitel)
	Second	Elder Herrera (COL)	(05 Orbitel)
	Third	Héctor Castaño (COL)	(05 Orbitel)
	Points	Raúl Montaña (COL)	(Néctar-Aguila Roja)
	Mountains	Raúl Montaña (COL)	(Néctar-Aguila Roja)
	Combination	Raúl Montaña (COL)	(Néctar-Aguila Roja)
	Sprints	Alexander Clavero (CUB)	(Cuban National Team)
	Team	05 Orbitel	

The 50th edition of the Vuelta a Colombia was held from June 11 to June 26, 2000.

== Stages ==
=== 2000-06-11: Circuito Cartagena (108 km) ===
Place	Stage 1		General Classification	
Place	Name	Time	Name	Time
1.	Andris Naudužs (LAT)	02:28.12	Andris Naudužs (LAT)	02:28.12
2.	Marlon Pérez (COL)	+0.04	Marlon Pérez (COL)	+0.04
3.	Jhon García (COL)	+0.05	Jhon García (COL)	+0.05

=== 2000-06-12: Cartagena — Barranquilla (141.9 km) ===
Place	Stage 2		General Classification	
Place	Name	Time	Name	Time
1.	Andris Naudužs (LAT)	03:40.30	Andris Naudužs (LAT)	06:08.32
2.	Jhon García (COL)	—	Jhon García (COL)	+0.09
3.	Pedro Pablo Pérez (CUB)	—	Marlon Pérez (COL)	+0.14

=== 2000-06-13: Puerto Giraldo — Sincelejo (174.9 km) ===
Place	Stage 3		General Classification	
Place	Name	Time	Name	Time
1.	Andris Naudužs (LAT)	04:29.21	Andris Naudužs (LAT)	10:37.43
2.	Yosvanni Gutiérrez (CUB)	—	Jhon García (COL)	+0.15
3.	Jhon García (COL)	—	Marlon Pérez (COL)	+0.24

=== 2000-06-14: Sincelejo — Montería (121.1 km) ===
Place	Stage 4		General Classification	
Place	Name	Time	Name	Time
1.	Andris Naudužs (LAT)	02:48.15	Andris Naudužs (LAT)	13:25.48
2.	Jhon García (COL)	—	Jhon García (COL)	+0.19
3.	Marlon Pérez (COL)	—	Marlon Pérez (COL)	+0.30

=== 2000-06-15: Caucasia — Yarumal (164 km) ===
Place	Stage 5		General Classification	
Place	Name	Time	Name	Time
1.	Héctor Palacio (COL)	04:41.11	Héctor Palacio (COL)	18:07.29
2.	Urbelino Mesa (COL)	—	Urbelino Mesa (COL)	+0.04
3.	Alexis Rojas (COL)	+0.05	Alexis Rojas (COL)	+0.11

=== 2000-06-16: Yarumal — Medellín (136.2 km) ===
Place	Stage 6		General Classification	
Place	Name	Time	Name	Time
1.	Raúl Montaña (COL)	03:08.47	Héctor Palacio (COL)	21:17.54
2.	Giovanny Torres (COL)	+1.36	Urbelino Mesa (COL)	+0.04
3.	Jhon García (COL)	+1.38	Alexis Rojas (COL)	+0.11

=== 2000-06-17: Medellín — Medellín (25.2 km) ===
Place	Stage 7 (Individual Time Trial)		General Classification	
Place	Name	Time	Name	Time
1.	Marlon Pérez (COL)	00:32.34	Héctor Palacio (COL)	21:52.29
2.	Raúl Montaña (COL)	+0.43	Elder Herrera (COL)	+1.01
3.	Javier Zapata (COL)	+0.56	Urbelino Mesa (COL)	+1.03

=== 2000-06-18: Oriente — Oriente (152.9 km) ===
Place	Stage 8		General Classification	
Place	Name	Time	Name	Time
1.	Jair Bernal (COL)	03:40.58	Héctor Palacio (COL)	25:35.00
2.	Raúl Montaña (COL)	+0.57	Elder Herrera (COL)	+1.18
3.	Héctor Palacio (COL)	+1.37	Dubán Ramírez (COL)	+1.36

=== 2000-06-19: Caldas — Manizales (196 km) ===
Place	Stage 9		General Classification	
Place	Name	Time	Name	Time
1.	Jairo Pérez (COL)	04:54.57	Héctor Palacio (COL)	29:31.06
2.	Raúl Montaña (COL)	+1.49	Elder Herrera (COL)	+1.19
3.	Alexis Rojas (COL)	—	Dubán Ramírez (COL)	+1.36

=== 2000-06-20: Cartago — Cali (184.6 km) ===
Place	Stage 10		General Classification	
Place	Name	Time	Name	Time
1.	Jhon García (COL)	04:18.07	Héctor Palacio (COL)	34:49.13
2.	César Acuña (COL)	—	Elder Herrera (COL)	+1.13
3.	Raúl Montaña (COL)	—	Dubán Ramírez (COL)	+1.37

=== 2000-06-21: Palmira — Pereira (222 km) ===
Place	Stage 11		General Classification	
Place	Name	Time	Name	Time
1.	Eliécer Valdés (CUB)	05:14.04	Héctor Palacio (COL)	40:08.52
2.	Alejandro Cortés (COL)	+0.03	Elder Herrera (COL)	+1.19
3.	Carlos Blanco (COL)	+0.07	Dubán Ramírez (COL)	+1.37

=== 2000-06-22: Pereira — Ibagué (125 km) ===
Place	Stage 12		General Classification	
Place	Name	Time	Name	Time
1.	Elder Herrera (COL)	03:50.35	Héctor Palacio (COL)	43:59.27
2.	Héctor Palacio (COL)	+0.06	Elder Herrera (COL)	+1.09
3.	Urbelino Mesa (COL)	—	Urbelino Mesa (COL)	+2.59

=== 2000-06-23: Ibagué — Soacha (181 km) ===
Place	Stage 13		General Classification	
Place	Name	Time	Name	Time
1.	Ruber Marín (COL)	05:01.14	Héctor Palacio (COL)	49:00.38
2.	Jairo Pérez (COL)	—	Elder Herrera (COL)	+1.09
3.	Hernán Bonilla (COL)	+6.15	Urbelino Mesa (COL)	+3.46

=== 2000-06-24: Chía — Villa de Leyva (157.2 km) ===
Place	Stage 14		General Classification	
Place	Name	Time	Name	Time
1.	Jairo Pérez (COL)	03:56.35	Héctor Palacio (COL)	52:12.03
2.	Ángel Camargo (COL)	+1.06	Elder Herrera (COL)	+1.09
3.	Daniel Rincón (COL)	—	Urbelino Mesa (COL)	+3.46

=== 2000-06-25: Villa de Leyva — Tunja (36.6 km) ===
Place	Stage 15 (Individual Time Trial)		General Classification	
Place	Name	Time	Name	Time
1.	Raúl Montaña (COL)	01:09.27	Héctor Palacio (COL)	54:23.18
2.	Álvaro Sierra (COL)	+0.11	Elder Herrera (COL)	+0.02
3.	Héctor Castaño (COL)	+0.34	Héctor Castaño (COL)	+1.37

=== 2000-06-26: Paipa — Bogotá (184.2 km) ===
Place	Stage 16		General Classification	
Place	Name	Time	Name	Time
1.	Yosvani Falcón (CUB)	04:28.35	Héctor Palacio (COL)	58:51.53
2.	Hernán Bonilla (COL)	—	Elder Herrera (COL)	+0.02
3.	Giovanny Huertas (COL)	—	Héctor Castaño (COL)	+2.41

== Final classification ==
RANK	NAME	TEAM	TIME
1.	Héctor Palacio (COL)	05-Orbitel	58:51:53
2.	Elder Herrera (COL)	05-Orbitel	+ 0.02
3.	Héctor Castaño (COL)	05 Orbitel	+ 1.37
4.	Dubán Ramírez (COL)	05-Orbitel	+ 4.45
5.	Jair Bernal (COL)	Lotería de Boyacá	+ 7.29
6.	Alexis Rojas (COL)	Aguardiente Cristal	+ 7.48
7.	Urbelino Mesa (COL)	Lotería de Boyacá	+ 8.47
8.	Julio César Aguirre (COL)	05-Orbitel	+ 9.56
9.	Federico Muñoz (COL)	Ciclistas de Jesucristo	+ 11.08
10.	Germán Ospina (COL)	Antioqueño-LM	+ 13.18

== Teams ==
Aguardiente Cristal — Chec

1. (Colombia) Alexis Rojas
2. (Colombia) Jhon García
3. (Colombia) Raúl Gómez
4. (Colombia) Celio Roncancio
5. (Colombia) Álvaro Lozano
6. (Colombia) Julio César Rangel
7. (Colombia) Heberth Gutiérrez
8. (Colombia) Víctor Herrera
9. (Colombia) Ferney Naranjo
10. (Colombia) Gregorio Ladino

05 Orbitel

11. (Colombia) Miguel Ángel Sanabria
12. (Colombia) Javier Zapata
13. (Colombia) Dubán Ramírez
14. (Colombia) Héctor Palacio
15. (Colombia) Daniel Rincón
16. (Colombia) Julio César Aguirre
17. (Colombia) Héctor Castaño
18. (Colombia) Elder Herrera
19. (Colombia) Carlos Osorio
20. (Colombia) Olmedo Capacho

Selle Italia — Néctar

21. (Colombia) Ruber Marín
22. (Italy) Francesco Pasquini
23. (Italy) Leonardo Scarselli
24. (Latvia) Andris Naudužs
25. (Italy) Guido Trombeta
26. (Hungary) Csaba Zekeres

Selección de Cuba

31. (Cuba) Idis Albin Tabares
32. (Cuba) Yosvani Falcón
33. (Cuba) Eliécer Valdez
34. (Cuba) Alexánder Clavero
35. (Cuba) Pedro Pablo Pérez
36. (Cuba) Luis Antonio Romero
37. (Cuba) Yosvany Gutiérrez
38. (Cuba) Rolando Basulto
39. (Cuba) Nivaldo Enríquez

Selección de Ecuador

41. (Ecuador) Héctor Chiles
42. (Ecuador) Ramiro Calpa
43. (Ecuador) Darwin Chulde
44. (Ecuador) Byron Chulde
45. (Ecuador) Juan Carlos Montenegro
46. (Ecuador) Pablo Caicedo
47. (Ecuador) Wílmer Portilla
48. (Ecuador) Franco Rodríguez

Aguardiente Antioqueño — Lotería de Medellín

51. (Colombia) Marlon Pérez
52. (Colombia) Germán Ospina
53. (Colombia) Argiro Zapata
54. (Colombia) Hernán Bonilla
55. (Colombia) Jorge Humberto Martínez
56. (Colombia) Ariel Martínez
57. (Colombia) Nélson Vargas
58. (Colombia) Ramón García
59. (Colombia) Alejandro Cortés
60. (Colombia) Oscar Álvarez

Lotería de Boyacá

61. (Colombia) Ismael Sarmiento
62. (Colombia) Ángel Camargo
63. (Colombia) Jair Bernal
64. (Colombia) Graciano Fonseca
65. (Colombia) Víctor Becerra
66. (Colombia) Giovanny Huertas
67. (Colombia) Ricardo Mesa
68. (Colombia) Ubaldo Mesa
69. (Colombia) Urbelino Mesa
70. (Colombia) Álvaro Sierra

Aguardiente Néctar — Selle — Aguila Roja

71. (Colombia) Israel Ochoa
72. (Colombia) Raúl Montaña
73. (Colombia) José Vanegas
74. (Colombia) Libardo Niño
75. (Colombia) Jairo Pérez
76. (Colombia) Elkin Barrera
77. (Colombia) César Acuña
78. (Colombia) Juan Fonseca
79. (Colombia) Víctor Hugo González
80. (Colombia) Edward Ruiz

Ciclistas de Jesucristo

81. (Colombia) Julio Ernesto Bernal
82. (Colombia) Federico Muñoz
83. (Colombia) Javier Anaya
84. (Colombia) Juan Antonio Barrero
85. (Cuba) Gil Cordovés
86. (Colombia) Nélson Ramírez
87. (Colombia) Jaime Pinzón

Ron Boyacá-Esmopar — Alcaldías Norte Boyacá

91. (Colombia) Néstor Bernal
92. (Colombia) Augusto Bohórquez
93. (Colombia) José Florencio Franco
94. (Colombia) Gustavo Vargas
95. (Colombia) Jairo Camargo
96. (Colombia) Carlos Blanco

Club Cicloases

101. (Colombia) Armando Ospina
102. (Colombia) Freddy Rincón
103. (Colombia) Uriel Chaparro
104. (Colombia) José Manuel Carrillo
105. (Colombia) Gerson Sánchez
106. (Colombia) Carlos Bohórquez

Panamericanos Bucaramanga 2000

111. (Colombia) Juan Diego Ramírez
112. (Colombia) Jorge Iván González
113. (Colombia) Giovanny Alexánder
114. (Colombia) Víctor Niño
115. (Colombia) Hernán Antolínez
116. (Colombia) Freddy Moncada
117. (Colombia) Óscar Alarcón

Mixto Federación — Tolima — Huila

121. (Colombia) Nazario Arango
122. (Colombia) Dayro Rodríguez
123. (Colombia) Óscar Pérez
124. (Colombia) Juan Carlos Pino
125. (Colombia) Tony Salgado
126. (Colombia) Edgar Quiñones
128. (Colombia) José Ibáñez
129. (Colombia) Miguel Ángel Niño
132. (Colombia) Juan Carlos Martínez

== See also ==
- 2000 Clásico RCN
