= 2000 Clásico RCN =

Race details
- Dates: August 11 – August 20
- Stages: 9
- Distance: 1,344 km (835.1 mi)
- Winning time: 36h 08' 11"

Results
	Winner	Juan Diego Ramírez (COL)	(05 Orbitel)
	Second	Elder Herrera (COL)	(05 Orbitel)
	Third	Julio César Aguirre (COL)	(05 Orbitel)
	Points	Elder Herrera (COL)	(05 Orbitel)
	Mountains	Juan Diego Ramírez (COL)	(05 Orbitel)
	Sprints	Víctor Herrera (COL)	(Aguardiente Cristal Chec)
	Team	(Colombia) 05 Orbitel	

The 40th edition of the annual Clásico RCN was held from August 11 to August 20, 2000, in Colombia. The stage race with an UCI rate of 2.4 started in Medellín and finished in Bogotá. RCN stands for "Radio Cadena Nacional" one of the oldest and largest radio networks in the nation.

== Stages ==
=== 2000-08-11: Medellín — Pueblito Paisa (5.4 km) ===
Place	Prologue		General Classification	
Place	Name	Time	Name	Time
1.	Libardo Niño (COL)	00:08.02	Libardo Niño (COL)	00:08.02
2.	Raúl Montaña (COL)	+ 0.01	Raúl Montaña (COL)	+ 0.01
3.	Dubán Ramírez (COL)	+ 0.02	Dubán Ramírez (COL)	+ 0.02

=== 2000-08-12: Medellín — Jardín (172 km) ===
Place	Stage 1		General Classification	
Place	Name	Time	Name	Time
1.	Julio César Aguirre (COL)	05:05.32	Julio César Aguirre (COL)	05:13.39
2.	Israel Ochoa (COL)	+ 0.08	Israel Ochoa (COL)	+ 0.14
3.	Álvaro Lozano (COL)	+ 0.10	Álvaro Lozano (COL)	+ 0.16

=== 2000-08-13: Jardín — Manizales (210 km) ===
Place	Stage 2		General Classification	
Place	Name	Time	Name	Time
1.	Héctor Palacio (COL)	05:40.19	Julio César Aguirre (COL)	10:54.04
2.	Álvaro Lozano (COL)	—	Álvaro Lozano (COL)	+ 0.14
3.	Julio César Aguirre (COL)	—	Israel Ochoa (COL)	+ 0.18

=== 2000-08-14: Manizales — Cartago (207 km) ===
Place	Stage 3		General Classification	
Place	Name	Time	Name	Time
1.	Jhon García (COL)	05:25.34	Julio César Aguirre (COL)	16:19.33
2.	Israel Ochoa (COL)	—	Álvaro Lozano (COL)	+ 0.12
3.	Ruber Marín (COL)	—	Israel Ochoa (COL)	+ 0.14

=== 2000-08-15: Roldanillo — Cali (131 km) ===
Place	Stage 4		General Classification	
Place	Name	Time	Name	Time
1.	Jhon García (COL)	03:06.18	Julio César Aguirre (COL)	19:25.51
2.	Elder Herrera (COL)	—	Israel Ochoa (COL)	+ 0.12
3.	Ruber Marín (COL)	—	Álvaro Lozano (COL)	+ 0.14

=== 2000-08-16: Palmira — Pereira (182 km) ===
Place	Stage 5		General Classification	
Place	Name	Time	Name	Time
1.	Giovanny Torres (COL)	04:23.02	Julio César Aguirre (COL)	23:52.34
2.	Pedro Pablo Pérez (CUB)	+ 0.08	Israel Ochoa (COL)	+ 0.12
3.	Jorge Martínez (COL)	—	Álvaro Lozano (COL)	+ 0.14

=== 2000-08-17: Pereira — Ibagué (126 km) ===
Place	Stage 6		General Classification	
Place	Name	Time	Name	Time
1.	Jairo Hernández (COL)	03:41.40	Juan Diego Ramírez (COL)	27:34.14
2.	Elder Herrera (COL)	+ 0.28	Julio César Aguirre (COL)	+ 0.21
3.	Juan Diego Ramírez (COL)	—	Álvaro Lozano (COL)	+ 0.30

=== 2000-08-18: Ibagué — Madrid (188 km) ===
Place	Stage 7		General Classification	
Place	Name	Time	Name	Time
1.	Elkin Barrera (COL)	05:19.55	Juan Diego Ramírez (COL)	30:56.41
2.	Julio César Aguirre (COL)	+ 1.20	Julio César Aguirre (COL)	+ 0.26
3.	Elder Herrera (COL)	+ 1.35	Álvaro Lozano (COL)	+ 0.58

=== 2000-08-19: Circuito Parque Nacional, Bogotá (102 km) ===
Place	Stage 8		General Classification	
Place	Name	Time	Name	Time
1.	Luis Espinosa (COL)	02:36.25	Juan Diego Ramírez (COL)	35:33.18
2.	Miguel Ángel Niño (COL)	—	Julio César Aguirre (COL)	+ 0.26
3.	Graciano Fonseca (COL)	—	Álvaro Lozano (COL)	+ 0.58

=== 2000-08-20: Plaza de Bolívar — Patios, Bogotá (18.5 km) ===
Place	Stage 9 (Individual Time Trial)		General Classification	
Place	Name	Time	Name	Time
1.	Elder Herrera (COL)	00:35.12	Juan Diego Ramírez (COL)	36:08.31
2.	Juan Diego Ramírez (COL)	+0.01	Elder Herrera (COL)	+ 0.57
3.	Jairo Hernández (COL)	+0.01	Julio César Aguirre (COL)	+ 1.19

== Final classification ==
RANK	NAME	TEAM	TIME
1.	Juan Diego Ramírez (COL)	05 Orbitel	36:08:11
2.	Elder Herrera (COL)	05 Orbitel	+ 0.57
3.	Julio César Aguirre (COL)	05 Orbitel	+ 1.19
4.	Álvaro Lozano (COL)	Aguardiente Cristal Chec	+ 1.43
5.	Álvaro Sierra (COL)	Lotería de Boyacá	+ 2.10
6.	Héctor Castaño (COL)	05 Orbitel	+ 2.27
7.	Israel Ochoa (COL)	Aguardiente Néctar Café Aguila Roja	+ 3.15
8.	Miguel Ángel Sanabria (COL)	05 Orbitel	+ 7.37
9.	Libardo Niño (COL)	Aguardiente Néctar Café Aguila Roja	+ 8.05
10.	Jairo Hernández (COL)	05 Orbitel	+ 8.27

== Teams ==
05 Orbitel

1. (Colombia) Jairo Hernández
2. (Colombia) Héctor Palacio
3. (Colombia) Dubán Ramírez
4. (Colombia) Javier Zapata
5. (Colombia) Miguel Ángel Sanabria
6. (Colombia) Héctor Castaño
7. (Colombia) Juan Diego Ramírez
8. (Colombia) Julio César Aguirre
9. (Colombia) Elder Herrera
10. (Colombia) Carlos Osorio

Lotería de Boyacá

11. (Colombia) Álvaro Sierra
12. (Colombia) Jair Bernal
13. (Colombia) Ismael Sarmiento
14. (Colombia) Ángel Camargo
15. (Colombia) Ricardo Mesa
16. (Colombia) Giovanny Huertas
17. (Colombia) Víctor Niño
18. (Colombia) Urbelino Mesa
19. (Colombia) Giovanny Torres
20. (Colombia) Ubaldo Mesa

Aguardiente Antioqueño—Lotería de Medellín

21. (Colombia) Germán Ospina
22. (Colombia) Argiro Zapata
23. (Colombia) Hernán Bonilla
24. (Colombia) Nélson Vargas
25. (Colombia) Ariel Martínez
26. (Colombia) Jorge Humberto Martínez
27. (Colombia) Oved Ramírez
28. (Colombia) Oscar Álvarez
29. (Colombia) Ramón García
30. (Colombia) John Parra

Aguardiente Néctar—Café Águila Roja

31. (Colombia) Raúl Montaña
32. (Colombia) Libardo Niño
33. (Colombia) Israel Ochoa
34. (Colombia) Jairo Pérez
35. (Colombia) José Luis Vanegas
36. (Colombia) Fredy González
37. (Colombia) Elkin Barrera
38. (Colombia) César Goyeneche
39. (Colombia) Juan Fonseca

Aguardiente Cristal—Chec

41. (Colombia) Alexis Rojas
42. (Colombia) Ruber Marín
43. (Colombia) Celio Roncancio
44. (Colombia) Álvaro Lozano
45. (Colombia) Jhon García
46. (Colombia) Gregorio Ladino
47. (Colombia) Heberth Gutiérrez
48. (Colombia) Raúl Gómez
49. (Colombia) Víctor Herrera
50. (Colombia) Ferney Naranjo

Cuba de Aviación

51. (Cuba) Pedro Pablo Pérez
52. (Cuba) Eliécer Valdéz
53. (Cuba) Giovanny Falcón
54. (Cuba) Rolando Basulto
55. (Cuba) Luis Alberto Romero
56. (Cuba) Iddis Tabares

Club Ciclo Guachucal Nariño

61. (Colombia) Carlos Estancio
62. (Colombia) Germán Canchalá
63. (Colombia) Wálter Barco
64. (Colombia) Euler Herrera
65. (Colombia) Luis Alonso Irúa
66. (Colombia) Jorge Aguirre
67. (Colombia) Jorge Ceballos

Ron Boyacá—Covarachía—Dosmopar

71. (Colombia) Luis Espinosa
72. (Colombia) José Florencio Franco
73. (Colombia) Jairo Camargo
74. (Colombia) Néstor Bernal
75. (Colombia) Augusto Bohórquez
76. (Colombia) Gustavo Guzmán

Santa Fe Ron Añejo ELC

81. (Colombia) Víctor Hugo González
82. (Colombia) Edward Ruiz
83. (Colombia) José Ibáñez
84. (Colombia) Rigoberto Ibáñez
85. (Colombia) Javier Guerrero
86. (Colombia) Miguel Ángel Niño

Mixto Antioquia

91. (Colombia) Olmedo Capacho
92. (Colombia) Jorge Iván González
93. (Colombia) Luis Castañeda
94. (Colombia) Jorge Eliécer
95. (Colombia) José Diego Marín
96. (Colombia) John Freddy Restrepo
97. (Colombia) Otoniel Soto
98. (Colombia) Juan Carlos Arias

Mixto Cauca—Cicloases

101. (Colombia) Ricardo Arcila
102. (Colombia) Julio Viveros
103. (Colombia) Alfredo Muñoz
104. (Colombia) Freddy Rincón
105. (Colombia) Gerson Sánchez
106. (Colombia) Javier Castiblanco
107. (Colombia) Hildebrando Rodríguez

Kazakhstan—Mixto Boyacá

111. (Kazakhstan) Sergey Tretyakov
112. (Kazakhstan) Sergey Lavrenenko
113. (Kazakhstan) Vadim Kravchenko
114. (Kazakhstan) Mikhail Andreyev
115. (Colombia) Graciano Fonseca
116. (Colombia) Luis Ernesto Cely

== See also ==
- 2000 Vuelta a Colombia
