= 2006 Clásico RCN =

Race details
- Dates: October 15–22
- Stages: 8
- Distance: 1,170 km (730 mi)
- Winning time: 31h 07' 51"

Results
	Winner	Javier González (COL)	(EPM−Orbitel)
	Second	Libardo Niño (COL)	(Lotería de Boyacá)
	Third	Javier Zapata (COL)	(EPM−Orbitel)
	Points	Rafael Montiel (COL)	(Lotería de Boyacá)
	Mountains	Libardo Niño (COL)	(Lotería de Boyacá)
	Young rider	Sergio Henao (COL)	(Aguardiente Antioqueño)
	Team	EPM Orbitel	

The 46th edition of the annual Clásico RCN was held from October 15 to October 22, 2006, in Colombia. The stage race with an UCI rate of 2.3 started in Buenaventura and finished in Cali. RCN stands for "Radio Cadena Nacional" – one of the oldest and largest radio networks in the nation.

== Stages ==
=== 2006-10-15: Buenaventura – Cali (123 km) ===
Place	Stage 1		General Classification	
Place	Name	Time	Name	Time
1.	Jhon García (COL)	03:20.57	Jhon García (COL)	03:20.57
2.	Fredy González (COL)	—	Fredy González (COL)	+0.04
3.	Juan Diego Ramírez (COL)	+0.03	Juan Diego Ramírez (COL)	+0.09

=== 2006-10-16: Cali – Buga (116 km) ===
Place	Stage 2		General Classification	
Place	Name	Time	Name	Time
1.	Ismael Sarmiento (COL)	03:07.27	Jhon García (COL)	06:28.19
2.	Jhon García (COL)	+0.11	Fredy González (COL)	+0.06
3.	Fredy González (COL)	—	Juan Diego Ramírez (COL)	+0.15

=== 2006-10-17: Tuluá – Villamaría (188 km) ===
Place	Stage 3		General Classification	
Place	Name	Time	Name	Time
1.	Javier González (COL)	04:29.44	Javier González (COL)	10:58.21
2.	Elder Herrera (COL)	+0.30	Elder Herrera (COL)	+0.34
3.	Juan Diego Ramírez (COL)	+1.51	Juan Diego Ramírez (COL)	+1.46

=== 2006-10-18: Manizales – Sabaneta (180 km) ===
Place	Stage 4		General Classification	
Place	Name	Time	Name	Time
1.	Mauricio Ortega (COL)	04:38.41	Javier González (COL)	15:41.52
2.	Graciano Fonseca (COL)	+2.00	Juan Diego Ramírez (COL)	+1.46
3.	José Ibáñez (COL)	—	Oscar Álvarez (COL)	+2.15

=== 2006-10-19: Itagüí – Pereira (196.9 km) ===
Place	Stage 5		General Classification	
Place	Name	Time	Name	Time
1.	José Ibáñez (COL)	05:20.51	Javier González (COL)	21:05.18
2.	Mauricio Ortega (COL)	+1.43	Juan Diego Ramírez (COL)	+1.46
3.	Rafael Montiel (COL)	—	Oscar Álvarez (COL)	+2.15

=== 2006-10-20: Pereira – Armenia (44.8 km) ===
Place	Stage 6 (Individual Time Trial)		General Classification	
Place	Name	Time	Name	Time
1.	Libardo Niño (COL)	01:04.54	Javier González (COL)	22:11.59
2.	Javier González (COL)	+1.47	Libardo Niño (COL)	+01.31
3.	Javier Zapata (COL)	+3.00	Juan Diego Ramírez (COL)	+3.51

=== 2006-10-21: Calarcá – Ibagué (156.4 km) ===
Place	Stage 7		General Classification	
Place	Name	Time	Name	Time
1.	Elder Herrera (COL)	04:19.06	Javier González (COL)	26:31.38
2.	Libardo Niño (COL)	+0.33	Libardo Niño (COL)	+1.25
3.	Alejandro Serna (COL)	—	Juan Diego Ramírez (COL)	+3.51

=== 2006-10-22: Espinal – Bogotá (157.7 km) ===
Place	Stage 8		General Classification	
Place	Name	Time	Name	Time
1.	Ismael Sarmiento (COL)	04:35.07	Javier González (COL)	31:07.51
2.	Iván Casas (COL)	—	Libardo Niño (COL)	+1.25
3.	Rafael Montiel (COL)	+0.04	Javier Zapata (COL)	+4.28

== Final classification ==
RANK	NAME	TEAM	TIME
1.	Javier González (COL)	EPM−Orbitel	31:07:51
2.	Libardo Niño (COL)	Lotería de Boyacá	+ 1.25
3.	Javier Zapata (COL)	EPM−Orbitel	+ 4.28
4.	Elder Herrera (COL)	paginascolombianas.com	+ 4.59
5.	Sergio Henao (COL)	Aguardiente Antioqueño−IDEA	+ 5.16
6.	Álvaro Sierra (COL)	Lotería de Boyacá	+ 6.32
7.	Diego Calderón (COL)	Frutidelicias Frugos	+ 10.44
8.	Edwin Parra (COL)	EPM−Orbitel	+ 20.35
9.	Daniel Rincón (COL)	EPM−Orbitel	+ 21.24
10.	Alejandro Ramírez (COL)	EPM−Orbitel	+ 21.26

== Teams ==
Lotería de Boyacá — Coordinadora

- Director Deportivo: José Alfonso "El Pollo" López
1. (Colombia) Libardo Niño
2. (Colombia) Israel Ochoa
3. (Colombia) Álvaro Sierra
4. (Colombia) Víctor Niño
5. (Colombia) Ricardo Mesa
6. (Colombia) Graciano Fonseca
7. (Colombia) Víctor Becerra
8. (Colombia) Fredy Piamonte
9. (Colombia) Freddy Montaña

EPM — Orbitel

- Director Técnico: José Raúl Mesa
11. (Colombia) Daniel Rincón
12. (Colombia) Javier Alberto González
13. (Colombia) Fabio Duarte
14. (Colombia) Edwin Parra
15. (Colombia) Juan Diego Ramírez
16. (Colombia) Javier Zapata
17. (Colombia) Heberth Gutiérrez
18. (Colombia) Jhon García
19. (Colombia) Julián Rodas

Colombia es Pasión — Coldeportes

- Director Deportivo: Jairo Monroy Gutiérrez
21. (Colombia) Alexis Castro
22. (Colombia) Diego Montoya
23. (Colombia) Olmedo Capacho
24. (Colombia) Luis Castañeda
25. (Colombia) Jairo Hernández
26. (Colombia) Francisco Colorado
27. (Colombia) Rafael Montiel
28. (Colombia) Gerardo Rodríguez
29. (Colombia) Wilson Zambrano

Secretaría de Hacienda — Indeportes Boyacá — Alcaldía de Paipa

- Director Deportivo: Ángel Camargo
31. (Colombia) Giovanny Báez
32. (Colombia) Flober Peña
33. (Colombia) Santiago Ojeda
34. (Colombia) Néstor Bernal
35. (Colombia) Aldo Valero
36. (Colombia) Fabio Mahecha
37. (Colombia) Miguel Matta
38. (Colombia) Félix Castro
39. (Colombia) Fernando Camargo

Www.Paginascolombianas.Com

- Director Deportivo: Roberto Augusto Sánchez
41. (Colombia) Ismael Sarmiento
42. (Colombia) Elder Herrera
43. (Colombia) José Daniel Bernal
44. (Colombia) Samuel Cabrera
45. (Colombia) Armando Cárdenas
46. (Colombia) Dubán Enrique Agudelo
47. (Colombia) Juan Castelblanco
48. (Colombia) Fabio Avendaño

Aguardiente Antioqueño — Idea

- Director Deportivo: Héctor Castaño
51. (Colombia) Sergio Henao
52. (Colombia) Janier Acevedo
53. (Colombia) Arley Montoya
54. (Colombia) Juan Carlos Montoya
55. (Colombia) Wilson Grisales
56. (Colombia) William Muñoz
57. (Colombia) Weimar Roldán
58. (Colombia) Jaller Puerta
59. (Colombia) Jesús Castaño

Frutidelicias Frugos del Valle

- Director Deportivo: William Palacio
61. (Colombia) Diego Calderón
62. (Colombia) Fabio Montenegro
63. (Colombia) José Ibáñez
64. (Colombia) Deiby Ibáñez
65. (Colombia) Oscar Iván Sanceno
66. (Colombia) Franklin López
67. (Colombia) Remberto Jaramillo
68. (Colombia) Camilo Gómez
69. (Colombia) Dalivier Ospina

Coordinadora — Lotería de Boyacá

- Director Deportivo: José Alfonso "El Pollo" López
71. (Colombia) Iván Casas
72. (Colombia) Edilberto Martínez
73. (Colombia) Arlex Castro
74. (Colombia) Alejandro Serna
75. (Colombia) Marvin Correa
76. (Colombia) Jorge Acosta

Orbitel — EPM

- Director Deportivo: Carlos Jaramillo
81. (Colombia) Mauricio Neiza
82. (Colombia) Héctor Mesa
83. (Colombia) Alejandro Ramírez
84. (Colombia) Alejandro Cortés
85. (Colombia) Oscar Álvarez
86. (Colombia) Rubén Laverde
87. (Colombia) Juan Botero

Bogotá Sin Indifferencia — IDRD — Canapro

- Director Deportivo: Oliverio Cárdenas
91. (Colombia) Mauricio Soler
92. (Colombia) Giovanny Chacón
93. (Colombia) Carlos Rodríguez
94. (Colombia) Héctor Hernández
95. (Colombia) Fausto Mayorga
96. (Colombia) Jonathan Méndez
97. (Colombia) Jaime Lozano
98. (Colombia) Alexander Giraldo
99. (Colombia) Fabián Rincón

Frutidelicias Primacol

- Director Deportivo: Gustavo Cardona
101. (Colombia) Giovanny Barriga
102. (Colombia) Jairo Torres
103. (Colombia) Alex Rojas
104. (Colombia) Leonel Bonilla
105. (Colombia) Andrés Porras
106. (Colombia) Walter Nieto
107. (Colombia) Álvaro Montoya

Tolima Solidario — Lotería del Tolima

- Director Deportivo: Danilo Alvis
111. (Colombia) Hernán Vargas
112. (Colombia) Andrés Rodríguez
113. (Colombia) Dayro Rodriguez
114. (Colombia) John Jairo Montaño
115. (Colombia) Álvaro Gómez
116. (Colombia) Helber Rodriguez

Caldas Actitud Campeona 2008

- Director Deportivo: John Jairo Narváez
121. (Colombia) John Freddy Acosta
122. (Colombia) Dubán Páez
123. (Colombia) Didier Chaparro
124. (Colombia) Holger Orozco
125. (Colombia) Emerson Narváez
126. (Colombia) Julio César López
127. (Colombia) Jorge Iván Vélez
128. (Colombia) José Jaramillo

Alcaldía de Ibagué — Tolima Solidario

- Director Deportivo: Carlos Enrique "Ramillete" Pérez
131. (Colombia) Fredy González
132. (Colombia) Diego Quintero
133. (Colombia) Edinson Mahecha
134. (Colombia) Jaime Vergara
135. (Colombia) Julián Cardona
136. (Colombia) Alfonso Martínez
137. (Colombia) Diego Sanabria
138. (Colombia) John Sedano
139. (Colombia) Anderson Bonilla

GW Bicycletas Shimano

- Director Deportivo: Luis Alfonso Cely
141. (Colombia) Juan Carlos López
142. (Colombia) Mauricio Ortega
143. (Colombia) John Agudelo
144. (Colombia) Carlos Ospina
145. (Colombia) Wilmar Báena
146. (Colombia) Edwárd Stiver
147. (Colombia) Edgar Restrepo
148. (Colombia) Carlos Pulgarín
149. (Colombia) Bladimir Zapata

Postal Express — Químicos y Curtidores San Benito

- Director Deportivo: Marco Tulio Bustamante
151. (Colombia) Jesús Andrés Cruz
152. (Colombia) Gerson Sánchez
153. (Colombia) Gelvis Santamaría León
154. (Colombia) Carlos Robayo
155. (Colombia) Miguel Ángel Cendales
156. (Colombia) Rubén Darío Igua
157. (Colombia) Humberto Delgado
158. (Colombia) Juan Pablo Wilches
159. (Colombia) Norberto Wilches

Club Cicloases Cundinamarca

- Director Deportivo: Leonidas Herrera
161. (Colombia) Juan Carlos Torres
162. (Colombia) Efraín Montaña
163. (Colombia) Wilson Correa
164. (Colombia) Daniel Rodríguez
165. (Colombia) Gabriel Velásquez
166. (Colombia) John Manuel Cubillos
167. (Colombia) Celso González
168. (Colombia) Marco Javier Vega

Mixto

- Director Deportivo: John Jairo Rivera
171. (Colombia) Ricardo Giraldo
172. (Colombia) Carlos Alberto Fernández
173. (Colombia) Ferney Restrepo
174. (Colombia) Christian Torres
175. (Colombia) Héctor Barrera
176. (Colombia) Pedro Nelson Torres

== See also ==
- 2006 Vuelta a Colombia
