= 2002 Vuelta a Colombia =

Race details
- Dates: June 30 – July 14, 2002
- Stages: 14
- Distance: 1,728.8 km (1,074 mi)
- Winning time: 45h 34' 21"

Results
	Winner	José Castelblanco (COL)	(Colombia Selle Italia)
	Second	Elder Herrera (COL)	(05 Orbitel)
	Third	Libardo Niño (COL)	(Lotería de Boyacá)
	Points	Marlon Pérez (COL)	(05 Orbitel)
	Mountains	Julio César Rangel (COL)	(Alcaldía de Cabimas)
	Youth	Sebastián Castañeda (COL)	(Aguardiente Cristal)
	Combination	Julio César Rangel (COL)	(Alcaldía de Cabimas)
	Sprints	Javier Zapata (COL)	(05 Orbitel)
	Team	05 Orbitel	

The 52nd edition of the Vuelta a Colombia was held from June 30 to July 14, 2002.

== Stages ==
=== 2002-06-30: Cúcuta — Cúcuta (5.2 km) ===
Place	Prologue		General Classification	
Place	Name	Time	Name	Time
1.	Marlon Pérez (COL)	00:06.51	Marlon Pérez (COL)	00:06.51
2.	Jairo Pérez (COL)	+00.15	Jairo Pérez (COL)	+00.15
3.	Jairo Hernández (COL)	+00.20	Jairo Hernández (COL)	+00.20

=== 2002-07-01: Pamplona — Bucaramanga (142 km) ===
Place	Stage 1		General Classification	
Place	Name	Time	Name	Time
1.	Marlon Pérez (COL)	03:38.32	Marlon Pérez (COL)	03:45.23
2.	Jhon García (COL)	—	Jhon García (COL)	+00.24
3.	Ruber Marín (COL)	—	Jairo Pérez (COL)	+00.25

=== 2002-07-02: Bucaramanga — Socorro (109.1 km) ===
Place	Stage 2		General Classification	
Place	Name	Time	Name	Time
1.	Alexis Rojas (COL)	03:38.32	Marlon Pérez (COL)	04:05.13
2.	Hernán Bonilla (COL)	+00.04	Hernán Bonilla (COL)	+00.24
3.	Ismael Sarmiento (COL)	—	Jairo Hernández (COL)	+00.30

=== 2002-07-03: Socorro — Tunja (150.7 km) ===
Place	Stage 3		General Classification	
Place	Name	Time	Name	Time
1.	Jorge Humberto Martínez (COL)	04:48.40	Marlon Pérez (COL)	???????
2.	Graciano Fonseca (COL)	+00.09	Hernán Bonilla (COL)	+00.24
3.	Víctor Hugo González (COL)	+00.15	Jairo Hernández (COL)	+00.30

=== 2002-07-04: Tunja — Chía (115.7 km) ===
Place	Stage 4		General Classification	
Place	Name	Time	Name	Time
1.	Israel Ochoa (COL)	02:58.00	Marlon Pérez (COL)	15:02.06
2.	Gregorio Ladino (COL)	—	Hernán Bonilla (COL)	+00.28
3.	Marlon Pérez (COL)	+00.19	Jairo Hernández (COL)	+00.34

=== 2002-07-05: Bogotá — Bogotá (39 km) ===
Place	Stage 5 (Individual Time Trial)		General Classification	
Place	Name	Time	Name	Time
1.	José Castelblanco (COL)	00:42.09	José Castelblanco (COL)	15:44.48
2.	Elder Herrera (COL)	+00.25	Marlon Pérez (COL)	+00.15
3.	Libardo Niño (COL)	+00.42	Elder Herrera (COL)	+00.29

=== 2002-07-06: Bogotá — Bogotá (160.6 km) ===
Place	Stage 6		General Classification	
Place	Name	Time	Name	Time
1.	Jairo Pérez (COL)	03:57.54	José Castelblanco (COL)	19:50.12
2.	Luis Felipe Laverde (COL)	+01.10	Marlon Pérez (COL)	+00.15
3.	Rodolfo Camacho (COL)	+01.44	Elder Herrera (COL)	+00.29

=== 2002-07-07: Soacha — Ibagué (194 km) ===
Place	Stage 7		General Classification	
Place	Name	Time	Name	Time
1.	Hernán Bonilla (COL)	04:25.14	José Castelblanco (COL)	???????
2.	Marlon Pérez (COL)	+00.18	Marlon Pérez (COL)	+00.08
3.	Elder Herrera (COL)	—	Elder Herrera (COL)	+00.24

=== 2002-07-08: Ibagué — Pereira (121.7 km) ===
Place	Stage 8		General Classification	
Place	Name	Time	Name	Time
1.	Luis Castañeda (COL)	03:41.44	Elder Herrera (COL)	27:57.51
2.	Daniel Rincón (COL)	+00.02	Daniel Rincón (COL)	+01.52
3.	Elder Herrera (COL)	—	José Castelblanco (COL)	+01.53

=== 2002-07-09: Pereira — Cali (199.5 km) ===
Place	Stage 9		General Classification	
Place	Name	Time	Name	Time
1.	Félix Cárdenas (COL)	04:38.20	Elder Herrera (COL)	32:48.28
2.	Gregorio Ladino (COL)	—	José Castelblanco (COL)	+01.51
3.	Rodolfo Camacho (VEN)	—	Daniel Rincón (COL)	+01.52

=== 2002-07-10: Cali — Cali (17 km) ===
Place	Stage 10 (Individual Time Trial)		General Classification	
Place	Name	Time	Name	Time
1.	José Castelblanco (COL)	00:37.04	José Castelblanco (COL)	33:27.23
2.	Libardo Niño (COL)	+00.49	Elder Herrera (COL)	+00.47
3.	Víctor Niño (COL)	+00.54	Libardo Niño (COL)	+01.24

=== 2002-07-11: Buga — Armenia (106.1 km) ===
Place	Stage 11		General Classification	
Place	Name	Time	Name	Time
1.	Félix Cárdenas (COL)	02:35.10	José Castelblanco (COL)	36:03.50
2.	Marlon Pérez (COL)	+00.35	Elder Herrera (COL)	+00.46
3.	Manuel Guevara (VEN)	+00.39	Libardo Niño (COL)	+01.24

=== 2002-07-12: Manizales — Jericó (154 km) ===
Place	Stage 12		General Classification	
Place	Name	Time	Name	Time
1.	Hernán Darío Muñoz (COL)	04:01.32	José Castelblanco (COL)	40:05.24
2.	Julio César Rangel (COL)	+00.04	Elder Herrera (COL)	+02.01
3.	José Castelblanco (COL)	+00.06	Libardo Niño (COL)	+03.03

=== 2002-07-13: Jericó — El Escobero (105 km) ===
Place	Stage 13		General Classification	
Place	Name	Time	Name	Time
1.	Julio César Rangel (COL)	03:21.27	José Castelblanco (COL)	43:28.51
2.	Juan Diego Ramírez (COL)	+01.31	Elder Herrera (COL)	+04.13
3.	José Castelblanco (COL)	+01.59	Libardo Niño (COL)	+05.12

=== 2002-07-14: Circuito en Medellín (109.2 km) ===
Place	Stage 14		General Classification	
Place	Name	Time	Name	Time
1.	Jhon García (COL)	02:05.34	José Castelblanco (COL)	45:34.21
2.	Marlon Pérez (COL)	—	Elder Herrera (COL)	+04.13
3.	Ruber Marín (COL)	—	Libardo Niño (COL)	+05.12

== Final classification ==
RANK	NAME	TEAM	TIME
1.	José Castelblanco (COL)	Colombia Selle Italia	45:34:21
2.	Elder Herrera (COL)	05 Orbitel	+ 4.13
3.	Libardo Niño (COL)	Lotería de Boyacá	+ 5.12
4.	Hernán Darío Muñoz (COL)	Colombia Selle Italia	+ 6.25
5.	Daniel Rincón (COL)	05 Orbitel	+ 6.39
6.	Álvaro Sierra (COL)	Lotería de Boyacá	+ 8.34
7.	Hernán Bonilla (COL)	05 Orbitel	+ 10.59
8.	Ismael Sarmiento (COL)	Lotería de Boyacá	+ 11.24
9.	Argiro Zapata (COL)	05 Orbitel	+ 13.09
10.	Julio César Rangel (COL)	Alcaldía de Cabimas	+ 14.10

== See also ==
- 2002 Clásico RCN
