= 2000 Vuelta a Venezuela =

Race details
- Dates: October 17 – October 23
- Stages: 13
- Distance: 1,874.4 km (1,164.7 mi)
- Winning time: 44h 52' 46"

Results
Jersey awarded to the overall winner	Winner	Álvaro Lozano (COL)	(Colombia National Team)
	Second	Yeison Delgado (VEN)	(Triple Gordo Gob.)
	Third	Álvaro Sierra (COL)	(Triple Gordo)
	Points	Gil Cordovés (CUB)	(Gobernacíon del Zulía)
	Mountains	Rodolfo Camacho (COL)	(Triple Gordo)
	Sprints	Gil Cordovés (CUB)	(Gobernacíon del Zulía)

The 37th edition of the annual Vuelta a Venezuela was held from October 17 to October 29, 2000. The stage race started in San Fernando, and ended in San Cristóbal.

== Stages ==
=== 2000-10-17: San Fernando — San Fernando (129 km) ===
Place	Stage 1		General Classification	
Place	Name	Time	Name	Time
1.	Faviano Ferrari (ITA)	02:31.58	John Nava (VEN)	02:31.48
2.	John Nava (VEN)	—	Faviano Ferrari (ITA)	+0.02
3.	Robinson Merchán (VEN)	+0.05	Javier Anava (COL)	+0.12

=== 2000-10-18: Calabozo — San Juan de Los Morros (154 km) ===
Place	Stage 2		General Classification	
Place	Name	Time	Name	Time
1.	José Chacón Díaz (VEN)	03:35.34	José Chacón Díaz (VEN)	06:07.30
2.	Víctor Becerra (COL)	+0.33	Víctor Becerra (COL)	+0.34
3.	Tommy Alcedo (VEN)	+1.19	Tommy Alcedo (VEN)	+1.24

=== 2000-10-19: El Cabriales — Valencia (110 km) ===
Place	Stage 3		General Classification	
Place	Name	Time	Name	Time
1.	Gil Cordovés (CUB)	02:49.10	José Chacón Díaz (VEN)	08:56.40
2.	Oscar Alarcón (VEN)	—	Víctor Becerra (COL)	+0.34
3.	Mario Figueroa (VEN)	—	Tommy Alcedo (VEN)	+1.29

=== 2000-10-20: Yagua — San Diego (22 km) ===
Place	Stage 4-A (Individual Time Trial)		General Classification	
Place	Name	Time	Name	Time
1.	Faviano Ferrari (ITA)	00:29.08		
2.	Federico Muñoz (COL)	+0.01		
3.	César Salazar (COL)	+0.01		

=== 2000-10-20: Valencia — Valencia (94 km) ===
Place	Stage 4-B		General Classification	
Place	Name	Time	Name	Time
1.	Mario Figueroa (VEN)	01:44.59	José Chacón Díaz (VEN)	11:12.06
2.	Eduardo Guerrero (COL)	+0.02	Faviano Ferrari (ITA)	+0.29
3.	Tommy Alcedo (VEN)	+0.02	Federico Muñoz (COL)	+1.43

=== 2000-10-21: Valencia — Los Teques (133 km) ===
Place	Stage 5		General Classification	
Place	Name	Time	Name	Time
1.	Tommy Alcedo (VEN)	03:21.19	José Chacón Díaz (VEN)	14:33.25
2.	Álvaro Lozano (COL)	—	Federico Muñoz (COL)	+1.43
3.	Robinson Merchán (VEN)	—	Álvaro Lozano (COL)	+1.44

=== 2000-10-22: Bolívar — Caracas (130 km) ===
Place	Stage 6		General Classification	
Place	Name	Time	Name	Time
1.	Gil Cordovés (CUB)	02:50.10	José Chacón Díaz (VEN)	17:23.35
2.	Carlos Quiroga (URU)	—	Federico Muñoz (COL)	+1.43
3.	Oscar Alarcón (COL)	—	Álvaro Lozano (COL)	+1.44

=== 2000-10-23: Maracay — San Felipe (169 km) ===
Place	Stage 7		General Classification	
Place	Name	Time	Name	Time
1.	Mauzicio Vandelli (ITA)	04:05.49	José Chacón Díaz (VEN)	21:29.27
2.	Álvaro Lozano (COL)	+0.05	Álvaro Lozano (COL)	+1.42
3.	José Chacón Díaz (VEN)	—	Aldrim Salamanca (VEN)	+1.52

=== 2000-10-24: San Felipe Circuito (83 km) ===
Place	Stage 8-A		General Classification	
Place	Name	Time	Name	Time
1.	Gil Cordovés (CUB)	01:55.32		
2.	Carlos Quiroga (URU)	—		
3.	Mario Figueroa (VEN)	—		

=== 2000-10-24: Barquisimeto Circuit (63 km) ===
Place	Stage 8-B		General Classification	
Place	Name	Time	Name	Time
1.	Gil Cordovés (CUB)	01:29.51	José Chacón Díaz (VEN)	24:54.50
2.	Gabriel Maurev (ITA)	—	Álvaro Lozano (COL)	+1.42
3.	Franklin Chacón (VEN)	—	Aldrim Salamanca (VEN)	+1.52

=== 2000-10-25: Carora — Cabimas (201 km) ===
Place	Stage 9		General Classification	
Place	Name	Time	Name	Time
1.	Gil Cordovés (CUB)	04:47.09	José Chacón Díaz (VEN)	29:41.59
2.	Deivis Urdaneta (VEN)	—	Álvaro Lozano (COL)	+1.42
3.	Mario Figueroa (VEN)	—	Aldrim Salamanca (VEN)	+1.52

=== 2000-10-26: Cabimas — Dividive (157 km) ===
Place	Stage 10		General Classification	
Place	Name	Time	Name	Time
1.	Tonny Linares (VEN)	02:52.04	José Chacón Díaz (VEN)	33:37.38
2.	Josmer Méndez (VEN)	+0.04	Álvaro Lozano (COL)	+1.42
3.	Edgar Caballero (VEN)	+2.47	Aldrim Salamanca (VEN)	+1.52

=== 2000-10-27: Dividive — El Vigía (160 km) ===
Place	Stage 11		General Classification	
Place	Name	Time	Name	Time
1.	Gil Cordovés (CUB)	03:37.52	José Chacón Díaz (VEN)	??????
2.	Freddy Moncada (COL)	—	Álvaro Lozano (COL)	+1.42
3.	Robinson Merchán (VEN)	—	Aldrim Salamanca (VEN)	+1.52

=== 2000-10-28: El Vigía — San Cristóbal (175 km) ===
Place	Stage 12		General Classification	
Place	Name	Time	Name	Time
1.	Rodolfo Camacho (VEN)	04:29.11	Álvaro Lozano (VEN)	41:46.09
2.	Álvaro Lozano (COL)	—	Yeison Delgado (VEN)	+1.07
3.	Yeison Delgado (VEN)	—	Álvaro Sierra (COL)	+1.34

=== 2000-10-29: San Cristóbal Circuito (124 km) ===
Place	Stage 13		General Classification	
Place	Name	Time	Name	Time
1.	Freddy Moncada (COL)	03:06.27	Álvaro Lozano (VEN)	44:52.46
2.	Maurizio Vandelli (ITA)	+0.02	Yeison Delgado (VEN)	+1.07
3.	Robinson Merchán (VEN)	+0.04	Álvaro Sierra (COL)	+1.34

== Final classification ==
RANK	NAME	TEAM	TIME
1.	Álvaro Lozano (COL)	Distribuidora La Japonesa Lotería de Oriente	44:52:46
2.	Yeison Delgado (VEN)	Kino Táchira	+ 1.07
3.	Álvaro Sierra (COL)	Triple Gordo	+ 1.34
4.	José Chacón Díaz (VEN)	Kino Táchira	+ 1.59
5.	Eduardo Guerrero (COL)	Gobernacíon Trujillo Café Flor de Patria	+ 3.17
6.	César Salazar (COL)	Triple Táchira A	+ 4.12
7.	Edgar Ortega (VEN)	Bono del Ciclismo-Colombia	+ 5.08
8.	Robinson Merchán (VEN)	Kino Táchira	+ 5.11
9.	Aldrin Salamanca (VEN)	Kino Táchira	+ 6.00
10.	Freddy Moncada (COL)	Triple Gordo	+ 6.32
