= Victor Herrera =

Victor Herrera might refer to:

- Víctor Herrera (cyclist) (b. 1970), Colombian track and road cyclist
- Víctor Herrera (footballer) (b. 1980), Panamanian football (soccer) player
