= 1994 World Juniors Track Cycling Championships =

- Venue: Quito, Ecuador
- Date: August 1994

The 1994 World Juniors Track Cycling Championships were the 20th annual Junior World Championships for track cycling held in Quito, Ecuador in August 1994.

The Championships had five events for men (sprint, points race, individual pursuit, team pursuit and 1 kilometre time trial) and two for women (sprint and individual pursuit).

== Events ==
Event	Gold	Silver	Bronze
Men's Events
Sprint	Julio Herrera; Venezuela	Carlo Bottarelli; Italy	Toshiyuki Ono; Japan
Points race	Marlon Pérez Arango; Colombia	Tim De Peuter; Belgium	Ronnie Lauke; Germany
Individual pursuit	Bradley McGee; Australia	Thorsten Rund; Germany	Luke Roberts; Australia
Team pursuit	Bradley McGee; Ian Cristison; Grigg Homan; Luke Roberts; Australia	Heiko Szonn; Ronny Lauke; Lutz Birkenkamp; Michael Werner; Germany	Maurizio Semprini; Massimo Ferraretto; Alessandro Rota; Vicenzo Monterosso; Italy
Time trial	Jan van Eijden; Germany	Tony Homan; Spain	Diego Ortega; Spain

Event	Gold	Silver	Bronze
Women's Events
Sprint	Ina Heinemann; Germany	Roberta Passoni; Italy	Michelle Ferris; Australia
Individual pursuit	Sarah Ulmer; New Zealand	Judith Arndt; Germany	Aurélie G'styr; France

== Medal table ==
* Host nation (Ecuador)

Rank	Nation	Gold	Silver	Bronze	Total
1	Germany (GER)	2	3	1	6
2	Australia (AUS)	2	0	2	4
3	Colombia (COL)	1	0	0	1
3	New Zealand (NZL)	1	0	0	1
3	Venezuela (VEN)	1	0	0	1
6	Italy (ITA)	0	2	1	3
7	Spain (ESP)	0	1	1	2
8	Belgium (BEL)	0	1	0	1
9	France (FRA)	0	0	1	1
9	Japan (JPN)	0	0	1	1
Totals (10 entries)		7	7	7	21
