= 1999 Vuelta Ciclista de Chile =

Race details
- Dates: March 11 – March 21
- Stages: 10
- Distance: 1,463 km (909 mi)
- Winning time: 33h 51' 12"

Results
	Winner	Luis Fernando Sepúlveda (CHI)	(Bliss Sport)
	Second	Márcio May (BRA)	(Caloí-Parana)
	Third	Luis Romero (CUB)	(Cuba National Team)
	Mountains	Daniel Valter Rogelim (BRA)	(Caloí-Parana)
	Team	(France) Aix-en-Provence	

The 22nd edition of the Vuelta Ciclista de Chile was held from March 11 to March 21, 1999.

== Stages ==
=== 1999-03-11: Santiago (Circuito "Avenue Merino Benítez") (4 km) ===
Place	Prologue		General Classification	
Place	Name	Time	Name	Time
1.	Márcio May (BRA)	4.47	Márcio May (BRA)	4.47
2.	Luis Fernando Sepúlveda (CHI)	+0.02	Luis Fernando Sepúlveda (CHI)	+0.02
3.	Richard Rodríguez (CHI)	+0.07	Richard Rodríguez (CHI)	+0.07

=== 1999-03-12: Santiago — El Tabo (137.4 km) ===
Place	Stage 1		General Classification	
Place	Name	Time	Name	Time
1.	Fabio Veloso (SUI)	3:13.43	Márcio May (BRA)	3:18.30
2.	Pedro Pablo Pérez (CUB)	+0.04	Luis Fernando Sepúlveda (CHI)	+0.02
3.	Ángel Pérez (CHI)	+0.06	Richard Rodríguez (CHI)	+0.07

=== 1999-03-13: El Tabo — San Fernando (164.3 km) ===
Place	Stage 2		General Classification	
Place	Name	Time	Name	Time
1.	Olivier Trastour (FRA)		Olivier Trastour (FRA)	3:18.30
2.			Ángel Pérez (CHI)	+0.45
3.			Pedro Pablo Pérez (CUB)	+0.45

=== 1999-03-14: Curicó — Constitución (173.3 km) ===
Place	Stage 3		General Classification	
Place	Name	Time	Name	Time
1.	Luis Romero (CUB)		Olivier Trastour (FRA)	11:24.45
2.	Jaime Bretti (CHI)	+0.24	Luis Romero (CUB)	+0.26
3.			Luis Fernando Sepúlveda (CHI)	+0.45

=== 1999-03-15: Cauquenes — San Pedro de la Paz (149.4 km) ===
Place	Stage 4		General Classification	
Place	Name	Time	Name	Time
1.	Víctor Garrido (CHI)	3:49.31	Olivier Trastour (FRA)	15:14.26
2.	Ángel Pérez (CHI)	+0.04	Luis Romero (CUB)	+0.26
3.	Richard Rodríguez (CHI)	+0.06	Luis Fernando Sepúlveda (CHI)	+0.42

=== 1999-03-16: Concepción — Los Angeles (139.9 km) ===
Place	Stage 5		General Classification	
Place	Name	Time	Name	Time
1.	Ángel Pérez (CHI)	3:49.31	Olivier Trastour (FRA)	18:43.39
2.	Víctor Garrido (CHI)	+0.04	Luis Romero (CUB)	+0.26
3.	Pedro Pablo Pérez (CUB)	+0.06	Ángel Pérez (CHI)	+0.36

=== 1999-03-17: Los Angeles — Chillán (135 km) ===
Place	Stage 6		General Classification	
Place	Name	Time	Name	Time
1.	Víctor Garrido (CHI)	3:08.50	Olivier Trastour (FRA)	21:52.39
2.	Ángel Pérez (CHI)	+0.04	Luis Romero (CUB)	+0.26
3.	Pedro Pablo Pérez (CUB)	+0.06	Víctor Garrido (CHI)	+0.29

=== 1999-03-18: Chillán — Talca (158.4 km) ===
Place	Stage 7		General Classification	
Place	Name	Time	Name	Time
1.	Alberto Riquelme (CHI)	3:38.36	Olivier Trastour (FRA)	
2.	Franck Tognini (FRA)	+0.04	Ángel Pérez (CHI)	
3.	Ángel Pérez (CHI)	+0.04	Luis Romero (CUB)	

=== 1999-03-19: Talca — Curicó (97.5 km) ===
Place	Stage 8-A		General Classification	
Place	Name	Time	Name	Time
1.	Joél Mariño (CUB)	1:59.38		
2.	Pedro Pablo Pérez (CUB)	+0.02		
3.	Ángel Pérez (CHI)	+0.04		

=== 1999-03-19: Cruce Curicó — El Plumero (20 km) ===
Place	Stage 8-B		General Classification	
Place	Name	Time	Name	Time
1.	Luis Fernando Sepúlveda (CHI)	25.10	Luis Fernando Sepúlveda (CHI)	27:57.00
2.	Márcio May (BRA)	25.51	Márcio May (CHI)	+0.45
3.	Marco Arriagada (CHI)	25.58	Luis Romero (CUB)	+1.17

=== 1999-03-20: Curicó — Isla de Maipo (200 km) ===
Place	Stage 9		General Classification	
Place	Name	Time	Name	Time
1.	Joél Mariño (CUB)	25.10	Luis Fernando Sepúlveda (CHI)	27:57.00
2.	Ángel Pérez (CHI)	+0.04	Márcio May (BRA)	+0.45
3.	Alberto Riquelme (CHI)	+0.06	Luis Romero (CUB)	+1.17

=== 1999-03-21: Santiago (Circuito "Providencia") (71.4 km) ===
Place	Stage 10		General Classification	
Place	Name	Time	Name	Time
1.	Ángel Pérez (CHI)	1:32.34	Luis Fernando Sepúlveda (CHI)	33:51.12
2.	Pedro Pablo Pérez (CUB)	—	Márcio May (BRA)	+0.45
3.	Franck Tognini (FRA)	—	Luis Romero (CUB)	+1.17

== Final classification ==
RANK	CYCLIST	TEAM	TIME
1.	Luis Fernando Sepúlveda (CHI)	Bliss Sport	33:51.12
2.	Márcio May (BRA)	Caloí-Parana	+ 0.45
3.	Luis Romero (CUB)	Cuban National Team	+ 1.17
4.	Pedro Pablo Pérez (CUB)	Cuban National Team	+ 1.33
5.	Marco Arriagada (CHI)	Bliss-Sport	+ 1.42
6.	Hernandes Cuadri (BRA)	Caloí-Parana	+ 1.52
7.	Olivier Trastour (FRA)	Aix-en-Provence	+ 2.03
8.	Ángel Pérez (CHI)	Ekono-Zuko	+ 2.11
9.	Richard Rodríguez (CHI)	Bliss-Sport	+ 2.23
10.	Francisco Cabrera (CHI)	San Fernando	+ 2.32
