= Víctor Herrera =

Víctor Herrera might refer to:

- Víctor Herrera (cinematographer), Mexican cinematographer
- Víctor Herrera (cyclist) (born 1970), Colombian track and road cyclist
- Víctor Herrera (footballer) (born 1980), Panamanian footballer
