= Eduardo Guerrero =

Eduardo Guerrero may refer to:

- Eddie Guerrero (1967–2005), American professional wrestler
- Eduardo Guerrero (cyclist) (born 1971), Colombian road cyclist
- Eduardo Guerrero (rower) (1928–2015), Argentine rower and Olympic gold medalist
- Eduardo Guerrero (footballer) (born 2000), Panamanian footballer
- Eduardo "Lalo" Guerrero Jr. (1916 – 2005), American guitarist, singer and farm labor activist
