= Andris Naudužs =

Latvian cyclist

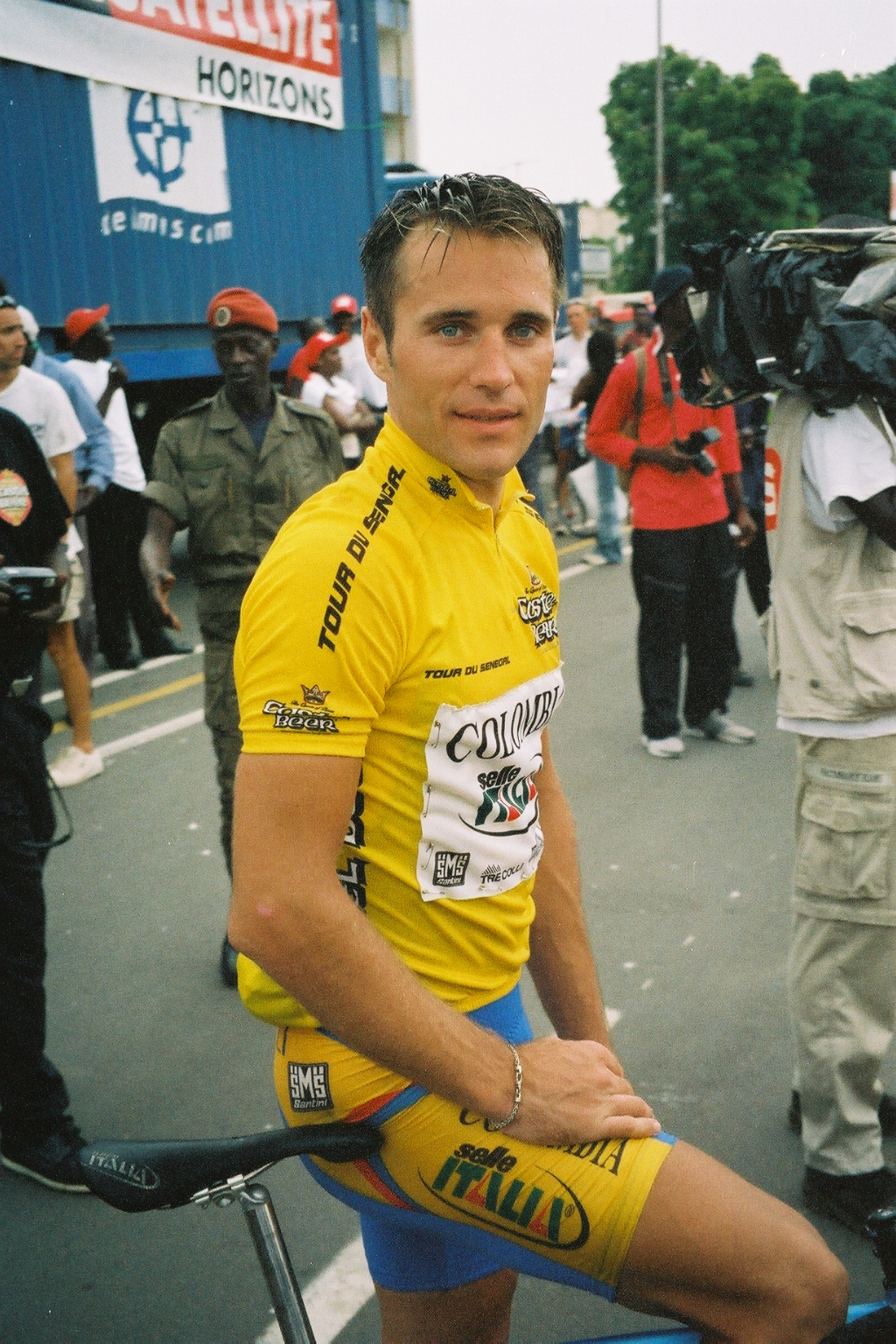
- Naudužs at Tour du Sénégal, 2002

Personal information
- Born: 9 September 1975 (age 50); Dobele, Latvia

Andris Naudužs (born 9 September 1975 in Dobele) is a former professional racing cyclist from Latvia.

== Palmarès ==
1999 - Selle Italia (Italy/Colombia)

- Note: He joined the Selle Italia team on the first of September.

2000 - Aguardiente Nectar-Selle Italia (Colombia/Italy)

3rd National Road Race Championships

- Tour du lac Leman (1.5)
  - Winner
- Vuelta a Colombia (2.5)
  - Winner in Stage 1
  - Winner in Stage 2
  - Winner in Stage 3
  - Winner in Stage 4
- Giro del Trentino (2.2)
  - Second Place in Stage 1a

2001 - Selle Italia-Pacific (Colombia/Italy)

- Stausee Rundfahrt (1.5) - 25 March
  - Winner
- Giro del Trentino (2.2)
  - Second place in Stage 4 – 165 km - 3 May
- Giro Rivera Ligure Ponente (2.4)
  - Second place in Stage 1 - 155.6 km - 21 February
- Tour de Langkawi (2.3)
  - Second place in Stage 11 - 162.9 km - 17 February
  - Second place in Stage 12 - 75.6 km criterium - 18 February
  - Third place in Stage 4 - 135.5 km - 9 February

2002 - Colombia-Selle Italia (Colombia/Italy)

- Tour de Senegal (2.5) - 1225 km - 14–25 October
  - Overall winner
  - Winner Sprint Point Competition
  - First place Stage 1 – 80 km - 15 October
  - First place Stage 10 – 100 km - 26 October
- Tour of Bulgaria (2.5)
  - First place in Stage 2–3 September
  - First place in Stage 4–5 September
- Tour de Langkawi (2.3)
  - Second place in Stage 8 - 95.5 km - 8 February

2003 - CCC-Polsat (Poland)

1st National Road Race Championships
2nd National Time Trial Championships

- Idea Mazovia Tour (2.5)
  - First Place Stage 3 - - 163.8 km - 25 July
- GP de la Ville de Rennes (1.3) - 157.5 km - 6 April
  - Second Place
- Course de la Soliderite Olympique (2.3)
  - Second Place - Stage 1 – 78 km - 2 July
- Tour du Poitou Charentes et de la Vienne (2.3)
  - Third place in Stage 1 – 180 km - 26 August
- Note: He joined the team on 26 March.

2004 - Domina Vacanze (Italy)

- Stausee-Rundfahrt (1.3) - 188 km - 21 March
  - Winner
- Giro della Provincia di Reggio Calabria (1.3) - 184 km - 6 March
  - Winner
- E3 Prijs Vlaanderen (1.1) - 195 km - 27 March
  - Third Place
- Giro d'Italia (GT)
  - Third place in Stage 10 – 146 km - 19 May

2005 - Naturino-Sapore di Mare (Italy)

- Circuit de Lorraine (2.1)
  - Overall winner
  - Sprinter's Points Competition
  - First Place - Stage 1 – 157 km - 27 April
  - Second Place - Stage 5 - 158.5 km - 30 April
- Circuit de la Sarthe (2.1)
  - Second Place - Stage 1 - 197.2 km - 5 April
  - Second Place - Stage 3 - 195.4 km - 7 April
