= John Jairo Montaño =

Colombian footballer (born 1984)

Personal information
- Full name: John Jairo Montaño Victoria
- Date of birth: April 17, 1984 (age 42)
- Place of birth: Cali, Valle, Colombia
- Height: 1.82 m (6 ft 0 in)
- Position: Left-back

Youth career
- 2001–2002: Deportivo Cali

Senior career*
Years	Team	Apps	(Gls)
2003–2004	Deportivo Cali	13	(1)
2005	Deportes Tolima	4	(0)
2006	Deportivo Cali	7	(0)
2007	Depor	15	(1)
2008–2010	Cortuluá	100	(8)
2010	Millonarios	11	(0)
2011	Boyacá Chicó	33	(2)
2012–2015	Deportivo Pasto	117	(14)
2015	Cúcuta Deportivo	8	(0)
2016–2017	Deportivo Pereira	66	(13)
2018	Unión Magdalena	31	(8)
2019	Cortuluá	6	(0)
2019	Deportes Quindío	5	(0)
- * Club domestic league appearances and goals

John Jairo Montaño (born April 17, 1984) is a retired Colombian defender.
