= Carlos Quiroga =

Argentine footballer

Personal information
- Full name: Carlos Armando Quiroga
- Place of birth: Argentina
- Position: Forward

Senior career*
Years	Team	Apps	(Gls)
1977	Unión de Santa Fe	60	(2)
1978	Club Gimnasia y Esgrima	10	(2)
1982–1983	Buffalo Stallions (indoor)	5	(0)
1983	Toronto Italia		
- * Club domestic league appearances and goals

Carlos Quiroga is an Argentine former footballer who played as a forward and is a football manager.

== Career ==
Quiroga played with Andes Talleres Sport Club, and won the league title. In 1977, he played in the Argentine Primera División with Unión de Santa Fe. In 1978, he played with Gimnasia y Esgrima de Mendoza. In 1982, he played abroad in the Major Indoor Soccer League with the Buffalo Stallions. In 1983, he played in the National Soccer League with Toronto Italia where he assisted in securing the NSL Championship by contributing a goal against Dinamo Latino. He later returned to Argentina to play with Luján Sport Club.

== Managerial career ==
Quiroga later became the head coach for Argentina Academy, North York Azzurri Soccer Club, and the Mississauga Falcons Soccer Club. He later formed a soccer school known as CAQ Soccer Training.

== Personal life ==
Quiroga's sister Olga Quiroga married his friend, the former footballer Carlos Salguero.
