= Julio Herrera (cyclist) =

Venezuelan cyclist

Personal information
- Full name: Julio César Herrera Navas
- Born: 28 November 1980 (age 45)

Cycling career
- Sport: Cycling
- Current team: Revivir GOB DC Yokosuna
- Discipline: Road
- Role: Rider

Amateur teams
- 2020: JAJOMTB Indet Trujillo
- 2021–: Revivir GOB DC Yokosuna

Julio César Herrera Navas (born 28 November 1980) is a Venezuelan road cyclist.

== Major results ==
2008
1st Stage 7b Vuelta a Cuba
2009
5th Clasico Corre Por La Vida
2011
4th Copa Federacion Venezolana De Ciclismo Corre Por La Vida
