= Élder Herrera =

Colombian cyclist

Personal information
- Full name: Élder Herrera Cortes
- Born: 28 December 1968 (age 57) Cali, Valle del Cauca, Colombia

Cycling career
- Sport: Cycling
- Current team: Retired
- Discipline: Road
- Role: Rider

Amateur teams
- 1991: Universal de Occidente–Hotel Confort
- 1992–1993: Pinturas Rust Oleum
- 1994–1995: Ron Medellín–Lotería de Medellín
- 1994–1995: Aguardiente Antioqueño–Lotería de Medellín
- 2004: Ace–Bryc
- 2005: Lotería de Boyacá
- 2009: GW–Shimano

Professional teams
- 1990: American Commerce National Bank
- 1996: Aguardiente Antioqueño–Lotería de Medellín
- 1997: Telecom–Flavia
- 1998: Avianca–Telecom–Kelme
- 1999–2003: 05 Orbitel

Élder Herrera Cortes (born 28 December 1968) is a Colombian former road cyclist.

== Major results ==
1992
1st Overall Vuelta al Valle del Cauca
1995
7th Overall Clásico RCN
9th Overall Vuelta a Colombia
1999
1st Overall Vuelta a Mendoza
2000
2nd Overall Vuelta a Colombia

1st Stage 12

2nd Overall Clásico RCN

1st Stage 9

2001
3rd Overall Clásico RCN
2002
1st Overall Vuelta al Tolima
2nd Overall Vuelta a Colombia
3rd Road race, National Road Championships
4th Overall Clásico RCN

1st Stage 7

2003
1st Road race, National Road Championships
1st Stage 3 Clasica Integración de la Guadua-Gobernación de Risaralda
1st Stage 2 Vuelta a Boyacá
2004
1st Stage 7 Vuelta de Higuito
2nd Overall Doble Sucre Potosí GP Cemento Fancesa
2005
2nd Individual pursuit, National Track Championships
2006
4th Overall Clásico RCN

1st Stage 7

2007
1st Stage 3 (TTT) & 11 Vuelta a Chiriquí
5th Overall Clásico RCN
2009
1st Prologue (TTT) Vuelta a Colombia
