= Luis Espinosa =

Colombian cyclist

Luis Edgar Espinosa Sepúlveda was born on November 17, 1967, in San Mateo, Boyacá in Colombia. He is a retired male road cyclist, and was a professional from 1992 to 1997.

== Career ==
1991
2nd in General Classification Tour of Austria (AUT)
1992
2nd in Colombia National Championships, Road, Elite, Colombia (COL)
2nd in General Classification Vuelta a Colombia (COL)
1st in General Classification Vuelta a Costa Rica (CRC)
1994
12th in General Classification Vuelta a España (ESP)
2000
1st in Stage 8 Clásico RCN, Bogotà (COL)
2001
7th in General Classification Vuelta a Venezuela (VEN)
