= Carlos Alberto Fernández =

Argentine politician

Carlos Alberto Fernández (Tandil, March 14, 1959) is an Argentine politician from the Radical Civic Union who served as a national deputy for the province of Buenos Aires between 2017 and 2021. He was a provincial senator for the 5th electoral section between 2009 and 2017.

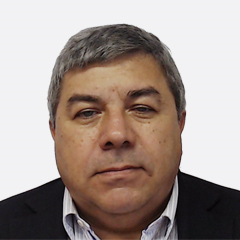
Image of Fernandez

== Biography ==
He was born in Tandil (the province of Buenos Aires) in 1959. As a young man, he joined the Radical Civic Union (UCR) in politics. Between 1983 and 1985, he served as secretary of the Deliberative Council of the Tandil Party, which he joined as an elected member in 1987–1991, 1993–1997, and 1997–2001, serving as president of the block of radical councilors in his last term. Between 1999 and 2003, he was its president.

In the 2009 provincial elections, he was elected to the Senate of the Province of Buenos Aires by the 5th Electoral Section, being vice president of the block of radical senators until 2011 and president of the same until 2015. He had been re-elected in 2013 by the Progressive Front Civic and Social, and since 2015, he has been the first vice president of the Buenos Aires Senate.

In the 2017 legislative elections, he was elected national deputy, being the sixth candidate on the Cambiemos list in the province of Buenos Aires, obtaining 42.18% of the votes. He serves as president of the National Defense Commission and is a member of the Commerce Commissions of Industry, Mercosur, and Internal Security. He voted in favor of the two voluntary termination of pregnancy bills that were debated by Congress in 2018 and 2020.

At the party level, he has been a member of the board of directors, convention, and vice president of the UCR of the province of Buenos Aires.
