= Noel Vasquez =

Venezuelan racing cyclist

Noel Vásquez
Personal information
- Full name: Noel Armando Vásquez Mendoza
- Born: 19 October 1976 (age 49) Capacho, Venezuela

Cycling career
- Sport: Cycling
- Current team: Retired
- Discipline: Road
- Role: Rider

Amateur teams
- 2007–2011: Gobernación del Zulia
- 2012–2013: Lotería del Táchira

Noel Armando Vásquez Mendoza (born October 19, 1976, in Capacho) is a Venezuelan former professional racing cyclist.

== Major results ==
2000
1st Overall Vuelta al Táchira

1st Stages 4 & 6

2001
1st Overall Vuelta al Táchira

1st Stage 6

5th Overall Vuelta a Colombia
2002
2nd Overall Vuelta al Táchira
1st Stages 7 & 11
2004
2nd Overall Vuelta a Guatemala
2008
National Road Championships
1st Road race

3rd Time trial

1st Stage 5 Vuelta al Táchira
6th Overall Clásico Ciclístico Banfoandes
2010
3rd Overall Vuelta al Táchira
2011
1st Overall Vuelta a Trujillo
3rd Overall Vuelta al Táchira
1st Stage 11
