= Olivier Trastour =

French cyclist

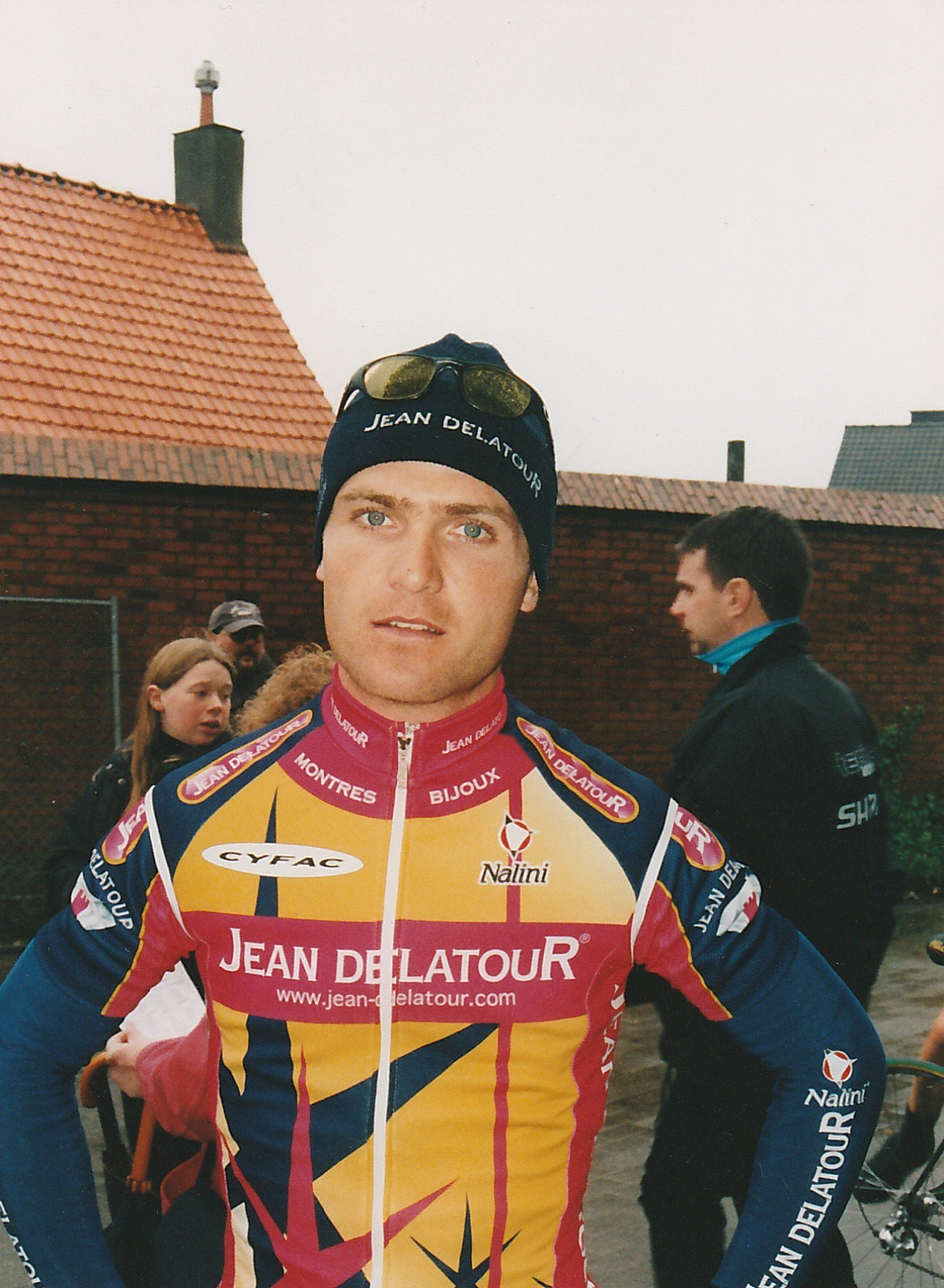

Personal information
- Born: 30 December 1971 (age 54) Cagnes-sur-Mer, France

Cycling career
- Sport: Cycling
- Current team: Retired
- Discipline: Road
- Role: Rider

Amateur teams
- 1994: US Mandelieu
- 1995: ASCM Toulon
- 1996: VC Lyon-Vaulx-en-Velin
- 1996: Mutuelle de Seine-et-Marne (stagiaire)
- 1997–1999: AVC Aix-en-Provence

Professional teams
- 2000–2001: Jean Delatour
- 2002–2003: AG2R Prévoyance

Olivier Trastour (born 30 December 1971) is a French former racing cyclist. He rode in the 2001 Tour de France.

== Major results ==
1997
1st Stage 3 Vuelta a Navarra
1999
1st Stage 2 Vuelta Ciclista de Chile
