= Julio César Aguirre =

Colombian cyclist

Personal information
- Full name: Julio César Aguirre Cabrera
- Born: July 15, 1969 (age 57) Bogotá, Colombia

Cycling career
- Sport: Cycling
- Current team: Retired
- Discipline: Road
- Role: Rider

Major wins
- Clásico RCN (1994)

Julio César Aguirre Cabrera (born July 15, 1969, in Bogotá) is a retired male road cyclist from Colombia, who was a professional rider from 1994 to 2003.

== Career ==
1994
1st in Clásica Santander (COL)
1st in Stage 9 Clásico RCN (COL)
1st in General Classification Clásico RCN (COL)
1996
1st in Stage 4 Clásico RCN (COL)
1st in Stage 12 Vuelta a Colombia, Cajamarca (COL)
1st in Stage 2 Vuelta a Itagui (COL)
1997
1st in Stage 2 Clasico Mundo Ciclistico (COL)
1st in General Classification Clasico Mundo Ciclistico (COL)
1st in Vuelta a Boyacá (COL)
8th in General Classification Vuelta a Colombia (COL)
1999
10th in General Classification Vuelta a Colombia (COL)
2000
1st in General Classification Clásica Ciudad de Girardot (COL)
8th in General Classification Vuelta a Colombia (COL)
1st in Stage 1 Clásico RCN, Jardin (COL)
3rd in General Classification Clásico RCN (COL)
2001
1st in Stage 4 Vuelta a Cundinamarca (COL)
2002
1st in Clásica de Fusagasugá (COL)
1st in Clasico Mundo Ciclistico (COL)
1st in General Classification Clasico Mundo Ciclistico (COL)
2003
1st in Stage 2 Vuelta al Tolima, Ibagué (COL)
