= Ubaldo Mesa =

Colombian cyclist

Personal information
- Born: November 20, 1973 Nobsa, Boyacá, Colombia
- Died: October 9, 2005 (aged 31) San Cristóbal, Bogotá, Colombia

Cycling career
- Sport: Cycling
- Discipline: Road cycling
- Role: Rider

Ubaldo Mesa Estepa (November 20, 1973 – October 9, 2005) was a male professional road cyclist from Colombia. He was the younger brother of Urbelino Mesa.

Mesa died from heart failure at age 31 after collapsing before a race.

== Career ==
2001
1st in General Classification Vuelta a Chiriquí (PAN)
1st in Stage 5 Clásico RCN, Mosquera (COL)
7th in General Classification Vuelta a Colombia (COL)
2003
1st in Stage 5 Tour of the Gila, Gila Monster Race (USA)
2nd in General Classification Tour of the Gila (USA)
2005
1st in Stage 2 Tour of the Gila, Mogollon (USA)
3rd in General Classification Tour of the Gila (USA)
