= Rodolfo Camacho =

Colombian racing cyclist (1975–2016)

Rodolfo Antonio Camacho Duarte (October 17, 1975 – August 7, 2016) was a Colombian-born Venezuelan road racing cyclist. He and his son were shot and killed in his home on August 7, 2016.

== Career ==
1999
1st in Stage 12 Vuelta al Táchira, San Cristóbal (VEN)
2000
1st in Stage 12 Vuelta a Venezuela, San Cristóbal (VEN)
2001
1st in General Classification Tour de la Guadeloupe (GUA)
1st in Stage 8 Vuelta al Táchira, La Grita (VEN)
2006
1st in Stage 7 part B Vuelta Internacional al Estado Trujillo, Carvajal (VEN)
2007
1st in Stage 8 Clasico Ciclistico Banfoandes, Cordero (VEN)
2008
1st in Stage 3 Clásico Virgen de la Consolación de Táriba, Lobatera (VEN)
1st in Stage 10 Clasico Ciclistico Banfoandes, San Cristóbal (VEN)
2009
6th in General Classification Vuelta a Venezuela (VEN)
