= Pedro Pablo Pérez =

Cuban cyclist

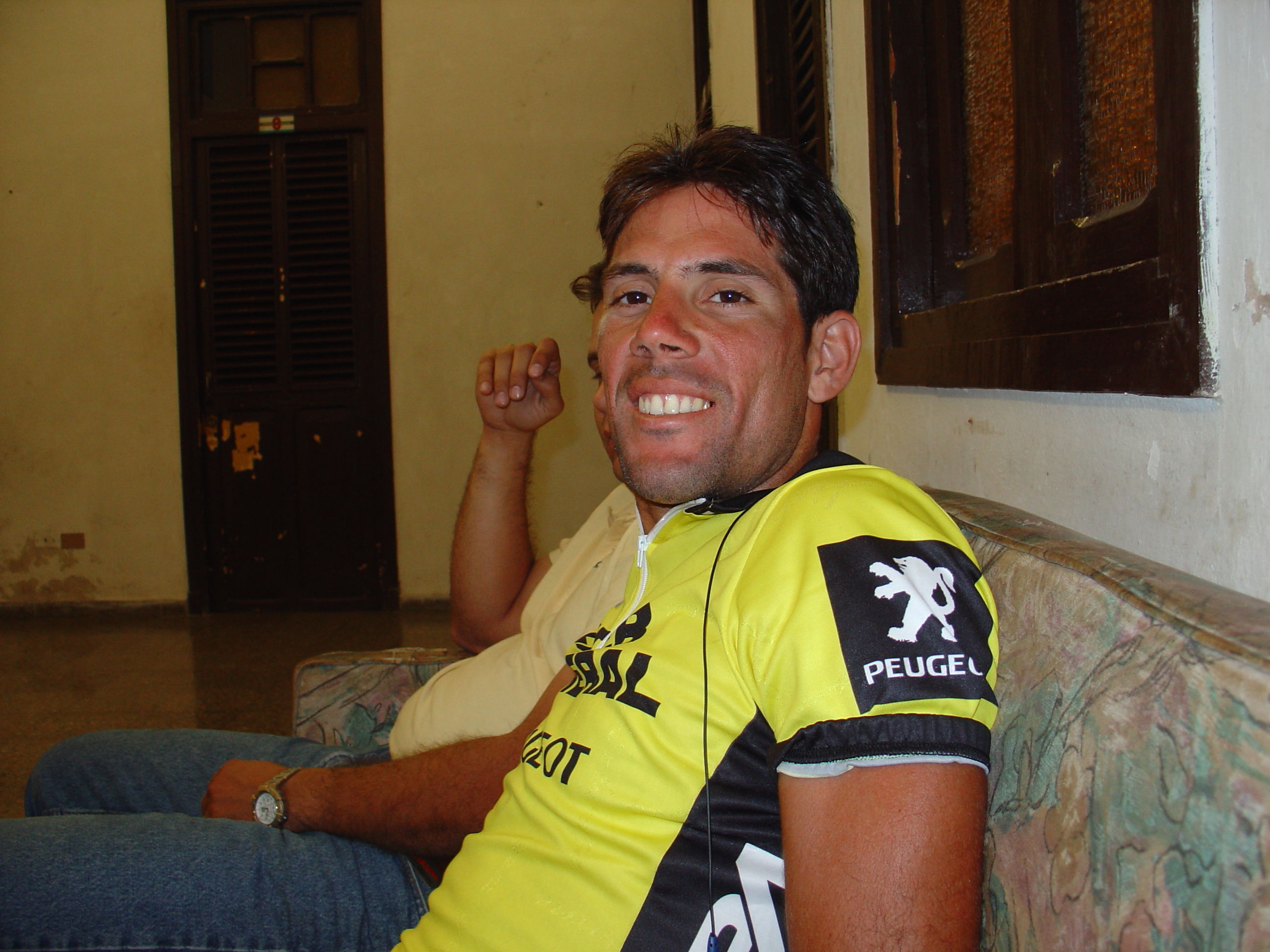
- Pedro Pablo Pérez relaxes during the 2004 Vuelta a Cuba

Personal information
- Full name: Pedro Pablo Pérez Márquez
- Nickname: "Pedro Pablo"
- Born: February 7, 1977 (age 49) Cuba
- Height: 6 ft 3 in (1.91 m)
- Weight: 197 lb (89 kg)

Cycling career
- Sport: Cycling
- Discipline: Road
- Role: Rider
- Rider type: All-around

Amateur team
- Cuban National Team

Major wins
- 2000 Vuelta a Cuba; 2000 Vuelta a Uruguay (Stage); 2001 Vuelta a Cuba; 2002 Clasico de Ciudad Caracas; 2002 Clasico de Ciudad Caracas; 2004 Vuelta a Cuba; 2006 Vuelta a Chiriqui (Stage); 2006 Vuelta a Costa Rica (Stage); 2007 Vuelta a Cuba; 2008 Vuelta a Cuba; 2008 Vuelta a Tachira (Stage); 2008 Premio Augustin Alcantara
Medal record
Representing Cuba
Men's road cycling
Pan American Games
Silver medal – second place	2003 Santo Domingo	Road Race
Bronze medal – third place	1999 Winnipeg	Road Race

Pedro Pablo Pérez Márquez (born February 7, 1977) is a Cuban professional racing cyclist. Known as "Pedro Pablo" by fans and competitors alike, Pérez is a five-time winner of the Vuelta a Cuba, a Pan American Games medalist, many times the National Champion of Cuba and a winner of international cycling events across the globe.

== Cycling experience ==
Pérez is one of the greatest Cuban cyclists of all time. He is a five-time winner of the Vuelta a Cuba (2000, 2001, 2004, 2007, 2008) – second only to his compatriot Eduardo Alonso with six. Pérez represented Cuba in the 2000 Sydney Olympics and qualified for the 2008 Beijing Games.

Career-ending Injury

Pérez missed the 2008 Games after suffering a near-fatal car crash in July. Details are unclear, but it is known Pérez was driving the car (a Lada) at the time when the crash occurred in San Cristobal, Pinar del Rio. Pérez suffered severe cerebral lacerations and spent several days in a coma. A female passenger was reported dead at the scene. He is receiving treatment at the Abel Santamaria hospital in the province of Pinar del Rio. Pérez intended to retire from cycling after the 2008 Olympics.

== Palmares ==
1999
1st in Stage 1 Vuelta al Tachira, Barquisimeto (VEN)
4th in General Classification Vuelta Ciclista de Chile (CHI)
(bronze) in Pan American Games, Road, Winnipeg (CAN)
2000
Vuelta a Cuba:

Winner stages 5 and 11A
Winner General Classification

1st in Stage 10 Vuelta Ciclista del Uruguay, Montevideo (URU)
2001
Vuelta a Cuba:

Winner Prologue, stages 1, 11A and 12
Winner General Classification

Cuba National Road Race Championship
2002
1st in Clasico ciudad de Caracas, Elite/U23 (VEN)
Vuelta a Cuba:

Winner stage 2
3rd place General Classification

1st in Stage 12 Vuelta a Venezuela, Quibor (VEN)
2003
(silver) in Pan American Games, Road, Santo Domingo (DOM)
2004
Vuelta a Cuba:

Winner stages 1, 2 and 7
Winner General Classification

2005
1st in Stage 6 Vuelta a Venezuela, San Diego de Alcalá (VEN)
2006
Vuelta a Cuba:

Winner stages 1, 6 and 9
Winner General Classification

2nd in National Championship, Road, Elite, Cuba (CUB)
1st in Stage 9 Vuelta a Chiriqui, David (PAN)
1st in Stage 2 Vuelta a Costa Rica, Playas del Coco (CRC)
1st in Stage 9 Vuelta a Costa Rica, Pérez Zeledón (CRC)
2007
Vuelta a Cuba:

Winner stages 4 and 5
2nd place General Classification

1st in Stage 2 Vuelta a Costa Rica, Playas del Coco (CRC)
1st in Stage 4 Vuelta a Costa Rica, Upala (CRC)
1st in Stage 9 Vuelta a Costa Rica, Santa Ana (CRC)
2008
1st in Stage 3 Vuelta al Tachira, Ciudad Bolivia (VEN)

== Other ==
Pérez is the father of one child (a son, from his first marriage), and is currently married to Yoanka González, herself a World Champion in cycling.
