= Yeison Delgado =

Colombian-born Venezuelan cyclist

Personal information
- Full name: Yeison Rogelio Delgado Ortega
- Born: 14 April 1977 (age 49) Cúcuta, Colombia

Cycling career
- Sport: Cycling
- Discipline: Road
- Role: Rider

Amateur teams
- 2007–2009: Gobernación del Zulia
- 2013: Kino Táchira
- 2014: Gobernación del Táchira
- 2015–2017: Amo Táchira–Concafé
- 2019: Venezuela Pais Futuro–Fina Arroz

Professional team
- 1998–1999: Kross–Selle Italia

Yeison Rogelio Delgado Ortega (born 14 April 1977 in Cúcuta, Colombia) is a Venezuelan professional racing cyclist. He was caught doping in the 2004 Vuelta a Guatemala, alongside Abel Jochola, Nery Velázquez, David Calanche, Noel Velázquez (2nd), Carlos López (3rd), Reynaldo Murillo and Federico Muñoz.

== Major results ==
2001
1st Stage 4 Vuelta a Colombia
2003
3rd Overall Vuelta al Táchira

1st Stage 9

2004
6th Overall Vuelta al Táchira
~~7th Overall Vuelta a Guatemala~~
2007
3rd Overall Vuelta a Yacambu-Lara

1st Stage 4

6th Overall Vuelta al Táchira
7th Overall Vuelta a Colombia
9th Overall Clásico Ciclístico Banfoandes
2008
2nd Overall Vuelta al Táchira
4th Road race, National Road Championships
2009
8th Overall Vuelta a Venezuela
2010
8th Overall Vuelta a Venezuela
2011
3rd Overall Vuelta Ciclista Chiapas
5th Overall Vuelta al Táchira
6th Overall Vuelta a Bolivia
2012
5th Overall Vuelta al Táchira
2013
1st Overall Vuelta al Táchira

1st Stage 7

2014
4th Overall Vuelta al Táchira
10th Overall Vuelta a Venezuela
2015
3rd Overall Vuelta al Táchira
2016
4th Overall Vuelta al Táchira
