= Héctor Castaño =

Colombian cyclist

Héctor Manuel Castaño Betancurt (born January 23, 1965, in Itagüí, Antioquia) is a retired male professional road cyclist from Colombia.

== Career ==
1994
1st in General Classification Vuelta a Antioquia (COL)
1999
5th in General Classification Clásico RCN (COL)
2000
3rd in General Classification Vuelta a Colombia (COL)
2001
4th in General Classification Vuelta a Colombia (COL)
