= Luis Orán Castañeda =

Colombian cyclist (1979–2020)

Personal information
- Born: 10 October 1979
- Died: 14 July 2020 (aged 40)

Cycling career
- Sport: Cycling
- Discipline: Road cycling

Professional teams
- 2000: Vitalicio Seguros
- 2001-2003: 05 Orbitel
- 2007: Colombia Es Pasion

Major wins
- Stage 9 Vuelta a Costa Rica

Luis Orán Castañeda Ramos (10 October 1979 — 14 July 2020) was a Colombian road cyclist. He rode the 2000 Giro d'Italia.

After his cycling career, he worked in a factory. On 14 July 2020, he died after an accident with a conveyor belt, aged 40.

== Teams ==
- 2000 Vitalicio Seguros-Grupo Generali (Spain)
- 2001–2003 05 Orbitel (Colombia)
- 2007 Colombia Es Pasion (Colombia)

== Achievements ==
1998

- 2nd General classification Vuelta de la Juventud Guatemala
- 1st stage 9 Vuelta a Costa Rica
- 1st stage 12 Vuelta a Costa Rica

1999

- (gold) Colombian road championships (U23)
- (gold) Colombian time trial championships (U23)
- 2nd General classification Vuelta de la Juventud Guatemala

2001

- 1st stage 2 (team time trial) 2001 Vuelta a Colombia

2002

- 1st Stage 3 Vuelta al Tolima
- 1st Stage 8 2002 Vuelta a Colombia
