= Ismael Sarmiento =

Colombian racing cyclist

Medal record

Men's road bicycle racing

Representing Colombia

Pan American Championships
| Silver medal – second place | 2002 Quito | Road race |

José Ismael Sarmiento Riaño (born July 15, 1973 in Cómbita, Boyacá) is a retired male road cyclist from Colombia. He was nicknamed "Pocholo" during his career.

== Major results ==
1995
2nd in Stage 8 Clásico RCN, Tunja (COL)
1996
3rd in Stage 3 Clásico RCN, Leona en Tocancipa (COL)
1998
1st in General Classification Vuelta a Guatemala (GUA)
1st in General Classification Vuelta de Higuito (CRC)
1999
3rd in Stage 14 Vuelta a Colombia, Zipaquirá (COL)
2000
3rd in Stage 2 Vuelta a Boyacà, El Humilladero (COL)
2001
2nd in Colombia National Championships, Road, Elite, Colombia (COL)
1st in General Classification Vuelta a Cundinamarca (COL)
2nd in Prologue Vuelta a Colombia, Popayan (COL)
2nd in Stage 2 Doble Copacabana GP Fides, Viacha (BOL)
2002
(silver) in Pan American Championships, Road, Elite
3rd in Stage 1 Vuelta a Boyacà, Chiquinquirá (COL)
3rd in Stage 4 Vuelta a Boyacà, Jenesano (COL)
3rd in Stage 2 Vuelta a Colombia, Socorro (COL)
3rd in Stage 1 Clásica Nacional Ciudad de Anapoima, Anapoima (COL)
1st in Stage 2 Clásica Nacional Ciudad de Anapoima, Anapoima (COL)
1st in General Classification Clásica Nacional Ciudad de Anapoima (COL)
2003
2nd in Stage 2 Clásica de Fusagasugá, Alto de San Miguel-Sibaté-Canoas-Soacha (COL)
2nd in Stage 1 Clásica de Fusagasugá, Fusagasugá (COL)
2nd in Stage 3 Clásica de Fusagasugá, Fusagasugá (COL)
1st in General Classification Clásica de Fusagasugá (COL)
3rd in Stage 1 GP Mundo Ciclistico, Mosquera (COL)
2nd in Stage 2 GP Mundo Ciclistico, Funza (COL)
2nd in General Classification GP Mundo Ciclistico (COL)
3rd in Stage 1 Vuelta a Boyacà, Chiquinquira (COL)
1st in Stage 1 Clásica Nacional Ciudad de Anapoima, Anapoima (COL)
1st in General Classification Clásica Nacional Ciudad de Anapoima (COL)
2004
2nd in Stage 4 Vuelta a Boyacà, Jenesano (COL)
2nd in General Classification Vuelta a Boyacà (COL)
1st in Stage 2 Vuelta a Colombia, Remolinos (COL)
2005
2nd in Stage 3 Vuelta a Boyacà, Saboyá (COL)
1st in General Classification Vuelta a Boyacà (COL)
2006
3rd in Circuito de Combita (COL)
3rd in Stage 1 Vuelta a los Santanderes, Cucuta (COL)
1st in Stage 2 Clásico RCN, Buga (COL)
1st in Stage 8 Clásico RCN, Bogotá (COL)
3rd in Stage 5 part a Doble Copacabana GP Fides, San Pablo de Tiquina (BOL)
2007
1st in Stage 2 Clásico RCN, Bogotá (COL)
2008
3rd in Stage 2 Vuelta a Boyacà, Paz de Río (COL)
2009
1st in Stage 2 part b Tour de la Guadeloupe, TTT, Les Abymes (GUA)

alongside Boris Carène, Nicolas Dumont, and José Daniel Bernal
