= Miguel Ángel Niño =

Colombian cyclist

Personal information
- Full name: Miguel Ángel Niño Corredor
- Born: 25 January 1971 (age 55) Paipa, Boyacá, Colombia

Cycling career
- Sport: Cycling
- Current team: Retired
- Discipline: Road
- Role: Rider

Amateur teams
- 1994: Agua Natural Glacial
- 1998–2000: Aguardiente Néctar–Selle Italia
- 2008–2011: EBSA

Professional teams
- 2011: LeTua Cycling Team
- 2012: Azad University Cross Team
- 2013: RTS Racing Team

Miguel Ángel Niño Corredor (born 25 January 1971) is a Colombian former professional road cyclist.

His brothers Libardo and Víctor also competed as professional cyclists.

== Major results ==
1996
1st Points classification, Vuelta a Colombia
2008
1st Overall Clasica del Meta
3rd Overall Clásica Aguazul
2011
1st Stage 5 Tour of Azerbaijan (Iran)
6th Overall International Presidency Tour

1st Stage 3
