= Álvaro Lozano =

Colombian cyclist (born 1964)

Personal information
- Born: May 14, 1964 (age 62) Cúcuta, Norte de Santander, Colombia

Cycling career
- Sport: Cycling
- Role: Rider

Major wins
- 1st in General Classification Clasico Ciclistico Banfoandes (1993, 1994)

Álvaro Lozano Moncada (born May 14, 1964, in Cúcuta, Norte de Santander) is a Colombian road racing cyclist.

== Career ==
1990
3rd in Colombia National Championships, Road, Elite, Colombia, Bogota (COL)
1991
1st in Combination Classification Volta a Portugal (POR)
1993
1st in General Classification Clasico Ciclistico Banfoandes (VEN)
1994
1st in General Classification Clasico Ciclistico Banfoandes (VEN)
1996
2nd in General Classification Clásico RCN (COL)
3rd in Colombia National Championships, Road, Elite, Colombia (COL)
1997
1st in General Classification Clásico Virgen de la Consolación de Táriba (VEN)
3rd in General Classification Vuelta a Venezuela (VEN)
1998
1st in General Classification Clásico Virgen de la Consolación de Táriba (VEN)
Vuelta a Venezuela (VEN)

1st in Stage 13
1st in Stage 15
1st in General Classification

1st in General Classification Vuelta Internacional al Estado Trujillo (VEN)
Vuelta al Táchira, San Cristóbal (VEN)

1st in Stage 12
2nd in General Classification

2000
1st in General Classification Vuelta a Venezuela (VEN)
Colombia National Championships, Road, Elite, Colombia (COL)

2nd in ITT
3rd in Road

4th in General Classification Clásico RCN (COL)
2001
3rd in General Classification Clasico Ciclistico Banfoandes (VEN)
2002
1st in Stage 13 Vuelta a Venezuela, Barquisimeto criterium (VEN)
1st in Stage 1 Vuelta a Costa Rica, Turrialba (CRC)
2003
6th in General Classification Vuelta a Venezuela (VEN)
2004
1st in Stage 3 Clásico RCN, Ibagué (COL)
