= Julio César Rangel =

Colombian cyclist (born 1968)

Julio César Rangel Melo (born February 11, 1968, in Bogotá) is a retired male road cyclist from Colombia.

== Career ==
1996
1st in General Classification Vuelta a Boyacá (COL)
1997
1st in Stage 10 Vuelta a Colombia, Alto Santa Helena (COL)
1999
8th in General Classification Clásico RCN (COL)
2002
1st in General Classification Clasico Ciclistico Banfoandes (VEN)
1st in Stage 6 Vuelta al Táchira, Mérida (VEN)
2nd in Stage 7 Vuelta al Táchira, La Grita (VEN)
1st in Stage 8 Vuelta al Táchira, Cerro Cristo Rey (VEN)
3rd in Stage 13 Vuelta al Táchira, San Cristóbal (VEN)
2nd in Stage 1 Vuelta a la Independencia Nacional, La Romana (DOM)
3rd in General Classification Vuelta a la Independencia Nacional (DOM)
2nd in Stage 12 Vuelta a Colombia, Jérico (COL)
1st in Stage 13 Vuelta a Colombia, El Escobero (COL)
1st in Stage 3 Vuelta a Costa Rica, Zurqui (CRC)
1st in Stage 9 Vuelta a Costa Rica, Tarbara (CRC)
1st in Stage 12 Vuelta a Costa Rica, San José (CRC)
1st in General Classification Vuelta a Costa Rica (CRC)
2003
2nd in Stage 15 Vuelta a las Americas, Toluca (MEX)
1st in General Classification Vuelta a la Americas (MEX)
1st in Stage 7 Vuelta a Guatemala, Quetzaltenango (GUA)
2nd in General Classification Vuelta a Guatemala (GUA)
3rd in Stage 8 Vuelta a Vuelta a Costa Rica, Cascajal de Coronado (CRC)
2004
3rd in Stage 9 Vuelta Ciclista de Chile, Portillo (CHI)
