= Marlon Pérez Arango =

Colombian cyclist (1976–2024)

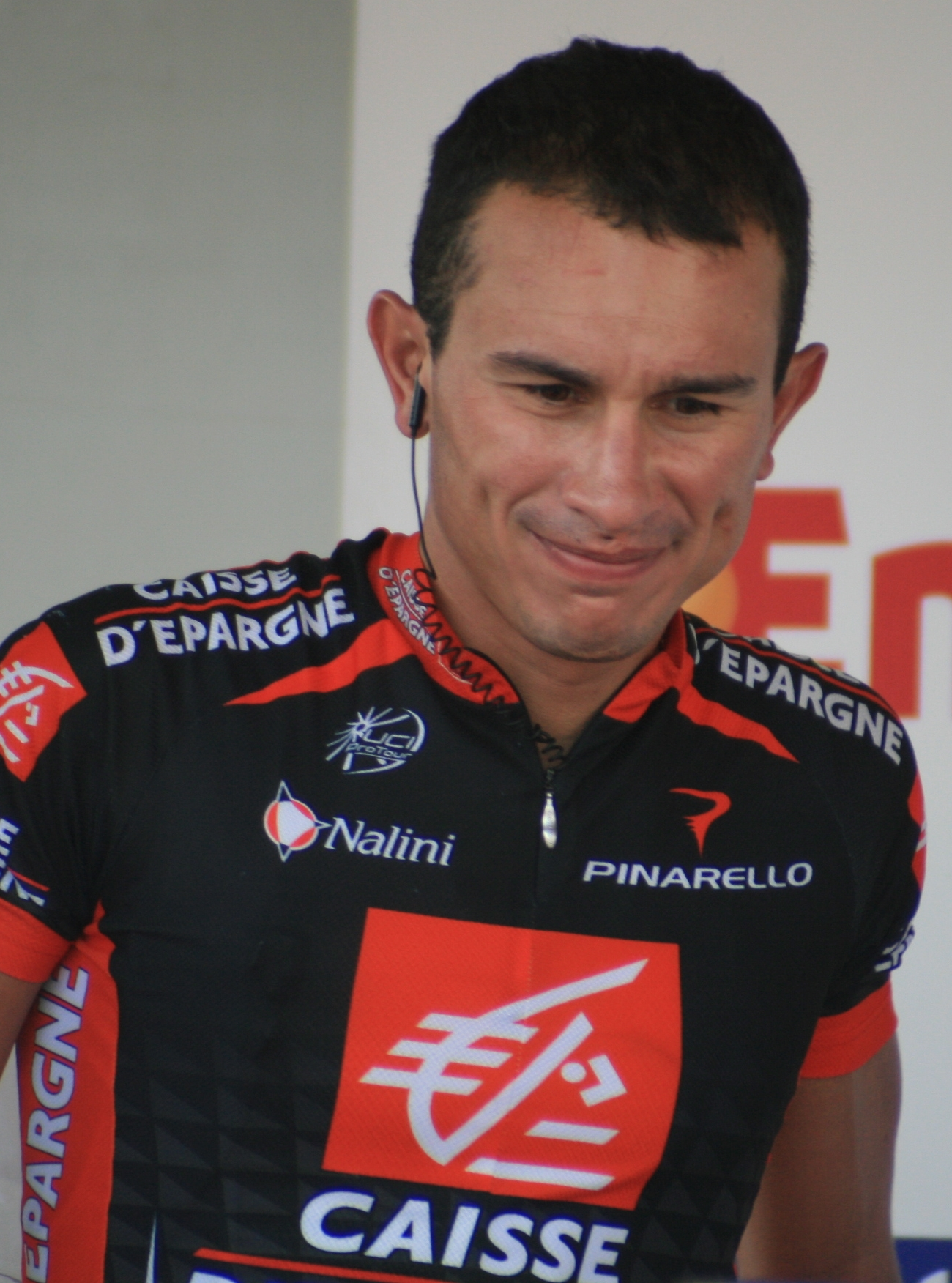
- Arango in 2008

Personal information
- Full name: Marlon Alirio Pérez Arango
- Born: 10 January 1976 Támesis, Antioquia, Colombia
- Died: 4 October 2024 (aged 48) El Carmen de Viboral, Colombia
- Height: 1.75 m (5 ft 9 in)
- Weight: 68 kg (150 lb)

Cycling career
- Sport: Cycling
- Disciplines: Road; Track
- Role: Rider

Amateur teams
- 1999: Empresas Públicas de Medellín
- 2000: Aguardiente Antioqueño–Lotería de Medellín
- 2000: RDM–Bianchi
- 2010–2011: GW–Shimano
- 2013: GW–Shimano
- 2016–2017: Supergiros–Redetrans

Professional teams
- 2001: Linda McCartney–Jacob’s Creek–Jaguar
- 2001–2003: 05 Orbitel
- 2004–2005: Colombia–Selle Italia
- 2006: Tenax–Salmilano
- 2007: Universal Caffè–Ecopetrol
- 2008–2009: Caisse d'Epargne
- 2012: Coldeportes–Comcel
Medal record
Men's track cycling
Representing Colombia
Pan American Games
| Gold medal – first place | 2011 Guadalajara | Time trial |
Central American and Caribbean Games
| Gold medal – first place | 1998 Maracaibo | Time trial |
World Junior Championships
| Gold medal – first place | 1994 Quito | Points race |

Marlon Alirio Pérez Arango (10 January 1976 – 4 October 2024) was a Colombian professional road bicycle racer who rode for the UCI ProTour team Caisse d'Epargne. He competed in the road and track categories for Colombia in the 1996, 2000 and 2004 Summer Olympic Games. He was stabbed to death at the age of 48.

== Major results ==
1994
1st Points race, UCI Junior Track World Championships
1996
1st Time trial, National Road Championships
1st Team pursuit, Pan American Track Championships
1997
1st Overall Clásica de Girardot
2nd Time trial, National Under-23 Road Championships
1998
1st Time trial, Central American and Caribbean Games
National Under-23 Road Championships

1st Road race
1st Time trial

1st Overall Vuelta de la Juventud de Colombia
1999
Pan American Games

1st Points race
3rd Individual pursuit

National Road Championships

1st Time trial
2nd Road race

1st Overall Vuelta al Valle del Cauca
1st Prologue & Stage 9 Clásico RCN
3rd Overall Vuelta del Uruguay

1st Stage 4

2000
1st Overall Points race, UCI Track World Cup

1st Points race, Cali
3rd Points race, Turin

Pan American Track Championships

1st Team pursuit
3rd Points race

1st Overall Tour Nord-Isère

1st Stages 1, 2 & 3

1st Seraing-Aachen-Seraing
1st Stage 7 (ITT) Vuelta a Colombia
2nd Overall Vuelta al Valle del Cauca
7th Druivenkoers-Overijse
2001
1st Time trial, National Road Championships
10th Overall Vuelta a Colombia

1st Prologue & Stages 1 & 2 (TTT)

2002
1st Prologue & Stage 1 Vuelta a Colombia
1st Stages 1 & 2 Vuelta a Boyacá
2nd Time trial, National Road Championships
2003
1st Stage 1 Clásico RCN
2nd Trophée des Grimpeurs
3rd Overall Vuelta al Valle del Cauca

1st Stage 2 (ITT)

3rd Overall Vuelta a Cundinamarca
7th Overall Vuelta a la Rioja
2004
1st Stages 1, 3 & 14 Vuelta al Táchira
3rd Trofeo dell'Etna
7th Overall Tour de Langkawi

1st Stage 2

9th GP Fred Mengoni
2005
1st Stages 4 & 10a (ITT) Vuelta a Venezuela
1st Stage 3 (ITT) Clásica de Girardot
7th Overall Tour de Langkawi
2007
6th Tre Valli Varesine
2008
8th Overall Tour du Poitou-Charentes
2010
1st Stages 1 (TTT), 3, 5 (ITT), 6 & 8 Clásico RCN
1st Stages 4 & 5 (ITT) Clásica de Girardot
1st Stage 4 Clásica de El Carmen de Viboral
1st Stage 3 Clásica de Anapoima
1st Prologue (TTT) Vuelta al Valle del Cauca
2011
1st Time trial, Pan American Games
1st Stage 1 (ITT) Vuelta a Colombia
1st Prologue Clásico RCN
2012
~~1st Stages 3 (ITT) & 9 Vuelta a Costa Rica~~
2nd Time trial, National Road Championships

=== Grand Tour general classification results timeline ===
| Grand Tour | 2004 | 2005 | 2006 | 2007 | 2008 |
|---|---|---|---|---|---|
| Giro d'Italia | 40 | DNF | — | — | 90 |
| Tour de France | — | — | — | — | — |
| Vuelta a España | — | — | — | — | — |

Olympic Games
| Preceded by Bernardo Tovar | Flagbearer for Colombia; Atlanta 1996 | Succeeded by María Urrutia |
