= Jorge Humberto Martínez =

Colombian cyclist

Medal record

Men's road bicycle racing

Representing Colombia

Pan American Championships
Silver medal – second place	2004 Cojedes	Road race

Jorge Humberto Martínez Correa (born November 5, 1975, in Jardín, Antioquia) is a male road cyclist from Colombia.

== Career ==
1999
2nd in General Classification GP Jornal de Noticias (POR)
1st in General Classification Vuelta de Higuito (CRC)
2002
1st in Stage 3 Vuelta a Colombia, Tunja (COL)
2003
2nd in General Classification Volta do Rio de Janeiro (BRA)
1st in Stage 2 Clasica Integración de la Guadua-Gobernación de Risaralda, Apia (COL)
2nd in General Classification Clasica Integración de la Guadua-Gobernación de Risaralda (COL)
2004
1st in Stage 1 GP Mundo Ciclistico, Fusagasugà (COL)
1st in General Classification GP Mundo Ciclistico (COL)
(silver) in Pan American Championships, Road, Elite, Tinaquillo
1st in Stage 3 Doble Copacabana GP Fides, TTT, La Paz (BOL)

alongside Javier de Jesús Zapata, Jairo Hernández, Walter Pedraza, Hernán Darío Muñoz, and Maurizio Henao

2005
1st in Stage 9 Vuelta a Colombia, Ciudad Bolivar (COL)
2006
1st in Stage 1 Vuelta a Uraba (COL)
2nd in General Classification Vuelta a Uraba (COL)
1st in Stage 2 Vuelta al Valle del Cauca (COL)
1st in Stage 1 Vuelta a San Luis Potosi (MEX)
1st in Stage 2 Vuelta a San Luis Potosi (MEX)
1st in General Classification Vuelta a San Luis Potosi (MEX)
1st in Stage 7 part a Vuelta al Estado de Oaxaca, Santa Maria Tula (MEX)
2nd in General Classification Vuelta al Estado de Oaxaca (MEX)
2008
1st in Stage 4 Vuelta del Huila (COL)
2009
1st in Stage 1 Clásico RCN, TTT, La Ceja (COL)
