= Víctor Hugo González =

Colombian cyclist

Víctor Hugo González Melo (born May 21, 1974 in Fusagasugá, Cundinamarca) is a male road cyclist from Colombia.

== Major results ==
2002
1st in General Classification Vuelta a Guatemala (GUA)
2003
1st in Stage 10 Vuelta a Guatemala, Guatemala (GUA)
1st in Stage 1 Doble Copacabana GP Fides, La Paz (BOL)
2005
1st in General Classification GP Vila-Real (ESP)
2009
4th in General Classification Clásica de Soacha (COL)
