= Víctor Herrera (cyclist) =

Colombian cyclist (born 1970)

Personal information
- Full name: Víctor Hugo Herrera Ramos
- Born: October 22, 1970 (age 55) Pesca, Boyacá, Colombia
Medal record
Men's track cycling
Representing Colombia
Central American and Caribbean Games
Gold medal – first place	1998 Maracaibo	Points race

Víctor Hugo Herrera Ramos (Note: In this Spanish name, the first or paternal surname is Herrera and the second or maternal family name is Ramos.) (born October 22, 1970, in Pesca, Boyacá) is a retired male track and road cyclist from Colombia.

== Career ==
1999
3rd in World Cup, Team Pursuit, Mexico City (MEX)
2003
1st in Stage 1 GP Mundo Ciclistico, Mosquera (COL)
2nd in Colombia National Championships, Track, Madison, Elite, Colombia (COL)
