= 2009 Vuelta a Colombia =

2008–09 UCI America Tour

Race details
- Dates: June 6–21, 2009
- Stages: 14
- Distance: 1,881.3 km (1,169 mi)
- Winning time: 43h 37' 55"

Results
Jersey awarded to the overall winner	Winner	José Rujano (VEN)	(Gobernacion del Zulía)
	Second	Freddy Montaña (COL)	(Boyacá es Para Vivirla)
	Third	César Salazar (COL)	(Loteria del Tachirá)
	Points	Artur García (VEN)	(Loteria del Tachirá)
	Mountains	José Rujano (VEN)	(Gobernacion del Zulía)
	Youth	Cristian Montoyá (COL)	(Indeportes Antioquia)
	Combination	Óscar Sevilla (ESP)	(RRC)
	Team	Loteria de Boyacá	

The 59th edition of the Vuelta a Colombia was held from June 6 to June 21, 2009. Stage nine was cancelled due to a landslide.

== Stages ==
=== 2009-06-06: Bogotá — Bogotá (7.6 km) ===
Place	Prologue (Team Time Trial)		General Classification	
Place	Name	Time	Name	Time
1.	GW-Shimano	00:08.38	Stiver Ortíz (COL)	00:08.38
2.	Loteria de Boyacá	+0.07	Juan Diego Ramírez (COL)	—
3.	UNE-EPM	+0.10	Francisco Colorado (COL)	—

=== 2009-06-07: Bogotá — Bogotá (85.9 km) ===
Place	Stage 1		General Classification	
Place	Name	Time	Name	Time
1.	Juan Alejandro García (COL)	02:06.17	Juan Alejandro García (COL)	02:14.42
2.	Jefferson Vargas (COL)	—	Jefferson Vargas (COL)	+0.23
3.	José Ibáñez (COL)	+0.54	Juan Diego Ramírez (COL)	+1.38

=== 2009-06-08: Mosquera — Ibagué (184.4 km) ===
Place	Stage 2		General Classification	
Place	Name	Time	Name	Time
1.	Alejandro Cortés (COL)	04:16.52	Juan Alejandro García (COL)	06:31.36
2.	Óscar Álvarez (COL)	+0.01	Jefferson Vargas (COL)	+0.23
3.	Juan Pablo Suárez (COL)	+0.02	Juan Diego Ramírez (COL)	+1.38

=== 2009-06-09: Ibagué — Ibagué (128.2 km) ===
Place	Stage 3		General Classification	
Place	Name	Time	Name	Time
1.	Fabio Duarte (COL)	03:54.56	Fabio Duarte (COL)	10:28.11
2.	Javier González (COL)	+2.17	Javier González (COL)	+2.17
3.	Fernando Camargo (COL)	+2.38	Freddy Montaña (COL)	+3.10

=== 2009-06-10: Circasia — Cali (195.5 km) ===
Place	Stage 4		General Classification	
Place	Name	Time	Name	Time
1.	Wilson Cepeda (COL)	04:09.47	Fabio Duarte (COL)	14:46.11
2.	Víctor González (COL)	—	Javier González (COL)	+2.17
3.	Jorge Duarte (COL)	+0.26	Freddy Montaña (COL)	+3.10

=== 2009-06-11: Guacari — Cartago (146.8 km) ===
Place	Stage 5		General Classification	
Place	Name	Time	Name	Time
1.	Artur García (VEN)	03:04.55	Javier González (COL)	17:53.23
2.	Weimar Roldán (COL)	—	Freddy Montaña (COL)	+0.53
3.	Fredy González (COL)	—	Fernando Camargo (COL)	+0.56

=== 2009-06-12: Santa Rosa de Cabal — Sabaneta (177.8 km) ===
Place	Stage 6		General Classification	
Place	Name	Time	Name	Time
1.	José Rujano (VEN)	04:35.52	José Rujano (VEN)	22:32.43
2.	Victor Niño (COL)	+2.43	Freddy Montaña (COL)	+0.33
3.	Óscar Sevilla (ESP)	+3.08	Fernando Camargo (COL)	+0.36

=== 2009-06-14: Medellín — Medellín (35 km) ===
Place	Stage 7 (Individual Time Trial)		General Classification	
Place	Name	Time	Name	Time
1.	Santiago Botero (COL)	00:41.35	José Rujano (VEN)	23:15.04
2.	Freddy Montaña (COL)	+0.30	Freddy Montaña (COL)	+0.27
3.	José Rujano (VEN)	+0.36	Santiago Botero (COL)	+0.58

=== 2009-06-15: Rionegro — El Escobero (119.5 km) ===
Place	Stage 8		General Classification	
Place	Name	Time	Name	Time
1.	José Rujano (VEN)	03:24.38	José Rujano (VEN)	26:39.32
2.	César Salazar (COL)	+3.09	Freddy Montaña (COL)	+3.54
3.	Freddy Montaña (COL)	+3.21	Santiago Botero (COL)	+4.50

=== 2009-06-16: Caldas — Manizales (167.2 km) ===
- Stage cancelled due to a landslide

=== 2009-06-17: Manizales — Guaduas (167.3 km) ===
Place	Stage 10		General Classification	
Place	Name	Time	Name	Time
1.	José Rujano (VEN)	04:38.47	José Rujano (VEN)	31:18.09
2.	Javier González (COL)	+0.55	Freddy Montaña (COL)	+5.03
3.	Freddy Montaña (COL)	+1.03	César Salazar (COL)	+7.49

=== 2009-06-18: Guaduas — Zipaquirá (141.8 km) ===
Place	Stage 11		General Classification	
Place	Name	Time	Name	Time
1.	Giovanny Báez (COL)	04:20.13	José Rujano (VEN)	35:41.15
2.	Óscar Sevilla (ESP)	+1.48	Freddy Montaña (COL)	+5.03
3.	Jorge Duarte (COL)	+1.48	César Salazar (COL)	+7.49

=== 2009-06-19: Ubaté — Tunja (158.7 km) ===
Place	Stage 12		General Classification	
Place	Name	Time	Name	Time
1.	Víctor Hugo Peña (COL)	03:55.45	José Rujano (VEN)	39:37.09
2.	Urbelino Mesa (COL)	+0.07	Freddy Montaña (COL)	+5.03
3.	Juan Pablo Wilches (COL)	+0.09	César Salazar (COL)	+7.49

=== 2009-06-20: Tunja — Bogotá (142.5 km) ===
Place	Stage 13		General Classification	
Place	Name	Time	Name	Time
1.	Glen Chadwick (NZL)	03:21.22	José Rujano (VEN)	43:02.59
2.	Francisco Mancebo (ESP)	+3.30	Freddy Montaña (COL)	+5.03
3.	Rafael Montiel (COL)	+3.53	César Salazar (COL)	+7.49

=== 2009-06-21: La Calera — Bogotá (23.1 km) ===
Place	Stage 14 (Individual Time Trial)		General Classification	
Place	Name	Time	Name	Time
1.	José Rujano (VEN)	00:34.56	José Rujano (VEN)	43:37.55
2.	Juan Pablo Suárez (COL)	+0.09	Freddy Montaña (COL)	+5.25
3.	Óscar Sevilla (ESP)	+0.16	César Salazar (COL)	+8.49

== Jersey progression ==
Stage	Winner	General classification	Points classification	Mountains classification	Youth classification
P	GW-Shimano	Stiver Ortíz	no award	no award	no award
1	Juan Alejandro García	Juan Alejandro García	unknown	unknown	unknown
2	Alejandro Cortés	Juan Alejandro García	unknown	unknown	unknown
3	Fabio Duarte	Fabio Duarte	unknown	unknown	unknown
4	Wilson Cepeda	Fabio Duarte	unknown	unknown	unknown
5	Artur García	Javier González	unknown	unknown	unknown
6	José Rujano	José Rujano	unknown	unknown	unknown
7	Santiago Botero	José Rujano	unknown	unknown	unknown
8	José Rujano	José Rujano	unknown	unknown	unknown
9	cancelled	José Rujano	unknown	unknown	unknown
10	José Rujano	José Rujano	unknown	unknown	unknown
11	Giovanny Báez	José Rujano	unknown	unknown	unknown
12	Víctor Hugo Peña	José Rujano	unknown	unknown	unknown
13	Glen Chadwick	José Rujano	unknown	unknown	unknown
14	José Rujano	José Rujano	Artur García	José Rujano	Cristian Montoyá

== Final classification ==
RANK	NAME	TEAM	TIME
1.	José Rujano (VEN)	Gobernacion del Zulia	43:37:55
2.	Freddy Montaña (COL)	Boyacá es Para Vivirla	+ 5.25
3.	César Salazar (COL)	Loteria del Tachirá	+ 8.49
4.	Mauricio Ortega (COL)	UNE-EPM	+ 9.35
5.	Luis Felipe Laverde (COL)	Colombia es Pasion	+ 13.17
6.	Edwin Parra (COL)	Boyacá es Para Vivirla	+ 13.29
7.	Javier González (COL)	Loteria de Boyacá	+ 15.27
8.	Giovanny Báez (COL)	UNE-EPM	+ 17.29
9.	Francisco Colorado (COL)	GW-Shimano	+ 17.43
10.	Fernando Camargo (COL)	Loteria de Boyacá	+ 22.01

== Teams ==
Une-Epm

1. (Colombia) Giovanny Báez
2. (Colombia) Mauricio Ortega
3. (Colombia) Juan Carlos López
4. (Colombia) Daniel Rincón
5. (Colombia) Hernán Darío Muñoz
6. (Colombia) Oscar Álvarez
7. (Colombia) Jhon García
8. (Colombia) Jorge Humberto Martínez
9. (Colombia) Freddy Piamonte
10. (Colombia) Jhon Martínez
- Director Deportivo: Raúl Mesa

Rock Racing

11. (Spain) Francisco Mancebo
12. (Spain) Óscar Sevilla
13. (United States) Sergio Hernández
14. (Spain) José Enrique Gutiérrez
15. (Colombia) Martín Velasco
16. (Australia) Aaron Kemps
17. (New Zealand) Glen Chadwick
18. (Colombia) Víctor Hugo Peña
19. (Colombia) César Grajales
- Director Deportivo: Rudy Pevenage

Lotería de Boyacá

21. (Colombia) Iván Parra
22. (Colombia) Graciano Fonseca
23. (Colombia) Urbelino Mesa
24. (Colombia) Jairo Pérez
25. (Colombia) Giovanni Torres
26. (Colombia) Edgar Fonseca
27. (Colombia) Fernando Camargo
28. (Colombia) Javier González
29. (Colombia) Pedro Herrera
30. (Colombia) Yoedison Bustamante
- Director Deportivo: Ángel Camargo

Colombia es Pasión — Café de Colombia

31. (Colombia) Fabio Duarte
32. (Colombia) Luis Felipe Laverde
33. (Colombia) Alex Caño
34. (Colombia) Alejandro Ramírez
35. (Colombia) Óscar Sánchez
36. (Colombia) Fabio Gordillo
37. (Colombia) Robinson Chalapud
38. (Colombia) Jairo Salas
39. (Colombia) Juan Pablo Forero
40. (Colombia) Fader Ardila
- Director Deportivo: Luis Saldarriaga

Gobernación del Zulia

41. (Venezuela) José Rujano
42. (Venezuela) Manuel Medina
43. (Venezuela) Nelson Gelves
44. (Venezuela) Franklin Chacón
45. (Venezuela) Adelso Valero
46. (Venezuela) Carlos Galvis
47. (Colombia) Raúl Saavedra
48. (Venezuela) Carlos Figueras
49. (Venezuela) Víctor Moreno
50. (Venezuela) Richard Ochoa
- Director Deportivo: Hernán Alemán

Indeportes Antioquia — Idea-Fla

51. (Colombia) Santiago Botero
52. (Colombia) Alejandro Cortés
53. (Colombia) Arley Montoya
54. (Colombia) Diego Calderón
55. (Colombia) Iván Hernández
56. (Colombia) Janier Acevedo
57. (Colombia) Julián Rodas
58. (Colombia) Jesús Castaño
59. (Colombia) Javier Zapata
60. (Colombia) Cristian Montoya
- Director Deportivo: Carlos Jaramillo

EBSA

61. (Colombia) Fredy González
62. (Colombia) Víctor Niño
63. (Colombia) Álvaro Gómez
64. (Colombia) Diego Quintero
65. (Colombia) Germán León
66. (Colombia) José Cordero
67. (Colombia) Camilo Gómez
68. (Colombia) Miguel Ángel Niño
69. (Colombia) Jairo Pérez
70. (Colombia) Robert Plazas
- Director Deportivo: Rafael Antonio Niño

Lotería del Táchira

71. (Venezuela) Rónald González
72. (Venezuela) Noel Vasquez
73. (Venezuela) Carlos Becerra
74. (Venezuela) Yeison Delgado
75. (Venezuela) Tomás Gil
76. (Venezuela) Rodolfo Camacho
77. (Venezuela) César Salazar
78. (Venezuela) Jimmy Briceño
79. (Venezuela) Jhonathan Camargo
80. (Venezuela) Artur García
- Director Deportivo: Roberto Sánchez

Para Tunja lo Mejor

81. (Colombia) Félix Cárdenas
82. (Colombia) Fabio Montenegro
83. (Colombia) Ismael Sarmiento
84. (Colombia) Néstor Bernal
85. (Colombia) Mauricio Neisa
86. (Colombia) Daniel Bernal
87. (Colombia) Edwin Sánchez
88. (Colombia) Flober Peña
89. (Colombia) Iván Casas
- Director Deportivo: Jairo Sierra

Néctar-Coldeportes-Cundinamarca.

91. (Colombia) José Castelblanco
92. (Colombia) Walter Pedraza
93. (Colombia) Samuel Cabrera
94. (Colombia) Rafael Montiel
95. (Colombia) Juan Torres
96. (Colombia) Giovanni Balsero
97. (Colombia) Juan Pablo Wilches
98. (Colombia) Víctor Hugo González
99. (Colombia) Miguel Ángel Díaz
100. (Colombia) Aldemar Herrera
- Director Deportivo: Raùl Gómez

GW-Chec

101. (Colombia) Juan Diego Ramírez
102. (Colombia) Francisco Colorado
103. (Colombia) Edwin Orozco
104. (Colombia) Juan Alejandro García
105. (Colombia) Weimar Roldán
106. (Colombia) Carlos Ospina
107. (Colombia) Stiver Ortíz
108. (Colombia) Elder Herrera
109. (Colombia) Jeobani Chacón
110. (Colombia) Jaime Vergara
- Director Deportivo: Luís Cely

Indervalle

111. (Colombia) Heberth Gutiérrez
112. (Colombia) Albeiro Sánchez
113. (Colombia) Álvaro Montoya
114. (Colombia) Edwin Sandoval
115. (Colombia) Franklin López
116. (Colombia) Remberto Jaramillo
117. (Colombia) Jhon Henao
118. (Colombia) Andrés Díaz
119. (Colombia) Julian López
120. (Colombia) Carlos Alzate
- Director Deportivo: William Palacios

Boyacá es para Vivirla

121. (Colombia) Jefferson Vargas
122. (Colombia) Santiago Ojeda
123. (Colombia) Edwin Parra
124. (Colombia) Alejandro Serna
125. (Colombia) Giovanny López
126. (Colombia) Freddy Montaña
127. (Colombia) Wilson Cepeda
- Director Deportivo: Vicente Belda

Alc. Armenia y Pereira

131. (Colombia) Jairo Hernández
132. (Colombia) Olmedo Capacho
133. (Colombia) Jorge Duarte
134. (Colombia) Juan Botero
135. (Colombia) Argiro Zapata
136. (Colombia) Alejandro García
137. (Colombia) Víctor Orozco
- Director Deportivo: Alejandro Carrizoza

Gobernación Nariño-Alkosto

141. (Colombia) Alex Atapuma
142. (Colombia) Edson Calderón
143. (Colombia) Oscar Suratá
144. (Colombia) Albert Quiquantar
145. (Colombia) Óscar Taimal
146. (Colombia) Luis Churfalán
147. (Colombia) Darwin González
- Director Deportivo: Remigio Atapuma

Cicloases

151. (Colombia) Camilo Castelblanco
152. (Colombia) Fabio Páez
153. (Colombia) Libardo Alape
154. (Colombia) Yerson Sánchez
155. (Colombia) Deiby Ibáñez
156. (Colombia) Luis Alonso
- Director Deportivo: Marcos Goyes

Estudiantes de Tunja

161. (Colombia) Ricardo Mesa
162. (Colombia) Emiro Mata
163. (Colombia) Raúl Saìz
164. (Colombia) Ángel Jiménez
165. (Colombia) Fabio Arenas
166. (Colombia) Mayler Prada
167. (Colombia) José Ibáñez

== See also ==
- 2009 Clásico RCN
