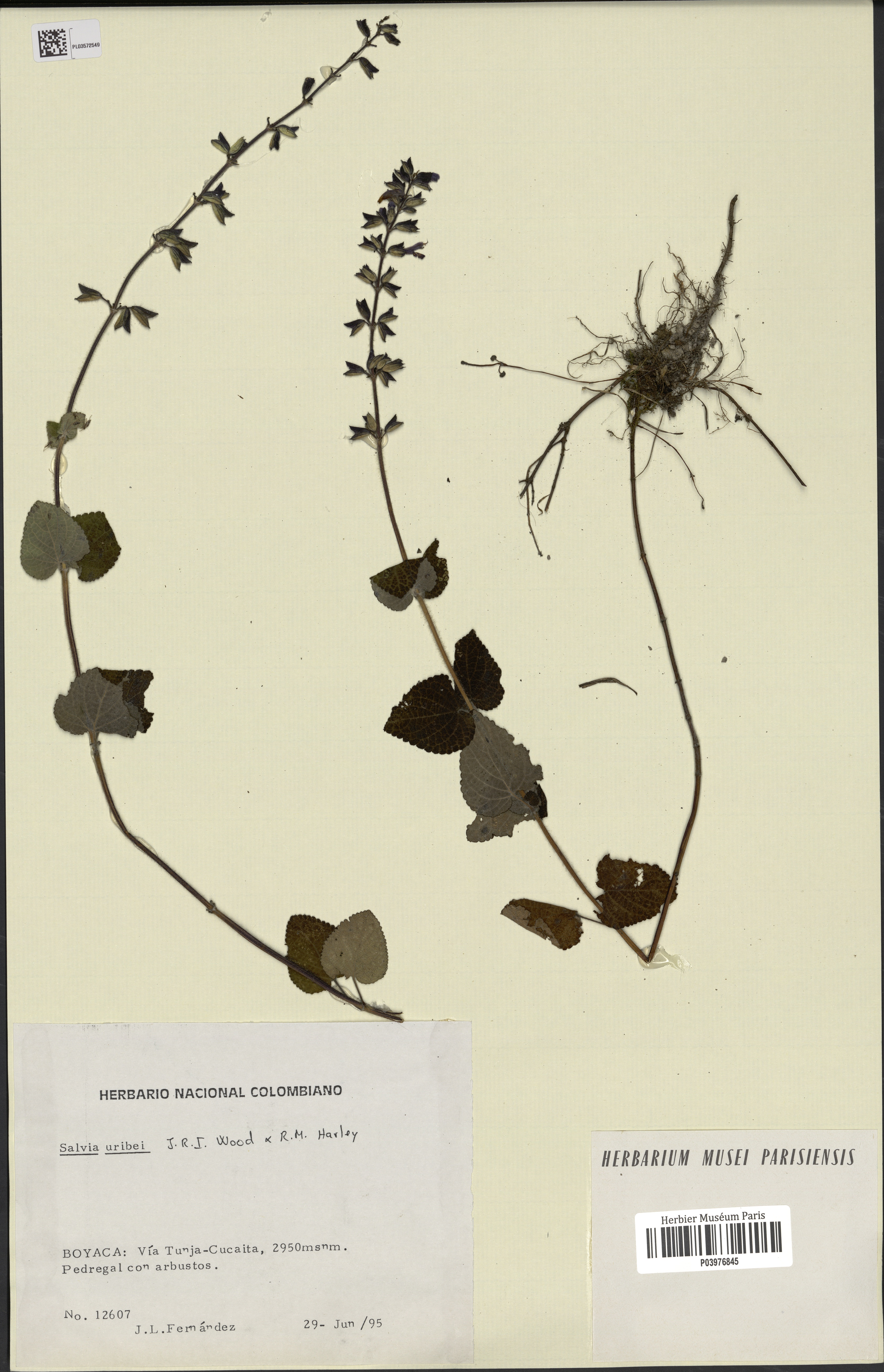

Scientific classification
- Kingdom: Plantae
- Clade: Tracheophytes
- Clade: Angiosperms
- Clade: Eudicots
- Clade: Asterids
- Order: Lamiales
- Family: Lamiaceae
- Genus: Salvia
- Species: S. uribei

Binomial name
- Salvia uribei J.R.I. Wood & Harley

= Salvia uribei =

Species of flowering plant

Salvia uribei is a herbaceous perennial that is endemic to a single small valley between Tunja and Cucaita in Colombia. It grows in dry scrub, along with Salvia palifolia and Peperomia species, between 2,900 to 2,950 m (9,510 to 9,680 ft) elevation. It was named after Lorenzo Uribe Uribe, who discovered the plant, and has made significant contributions to Colombian botany.

S. uribei is decumbent, rooting near the base, and growing to 30 cm (12 in) tall, with 4-angled stems with white hairs. The broad ovate leaves are 3 to 5 cm (1.2 to 2.0 in) long and 2.5 to 4.5 cm (0.98 to 1.77 in) wide, with the upper side dark green and pilose, and the underside grey tomentose. The inflorescence has 2 to 12 cm (0.79 to 4.72 in) terminal racemes, with a 15 to 16 mm (0.59 to 0.63 in) long corolla that has a blue upper lip and a dark violet lower lip with a white throat.
