= Christian Rivera (Colombian footballer) =

Colombian footballer (born 1996)

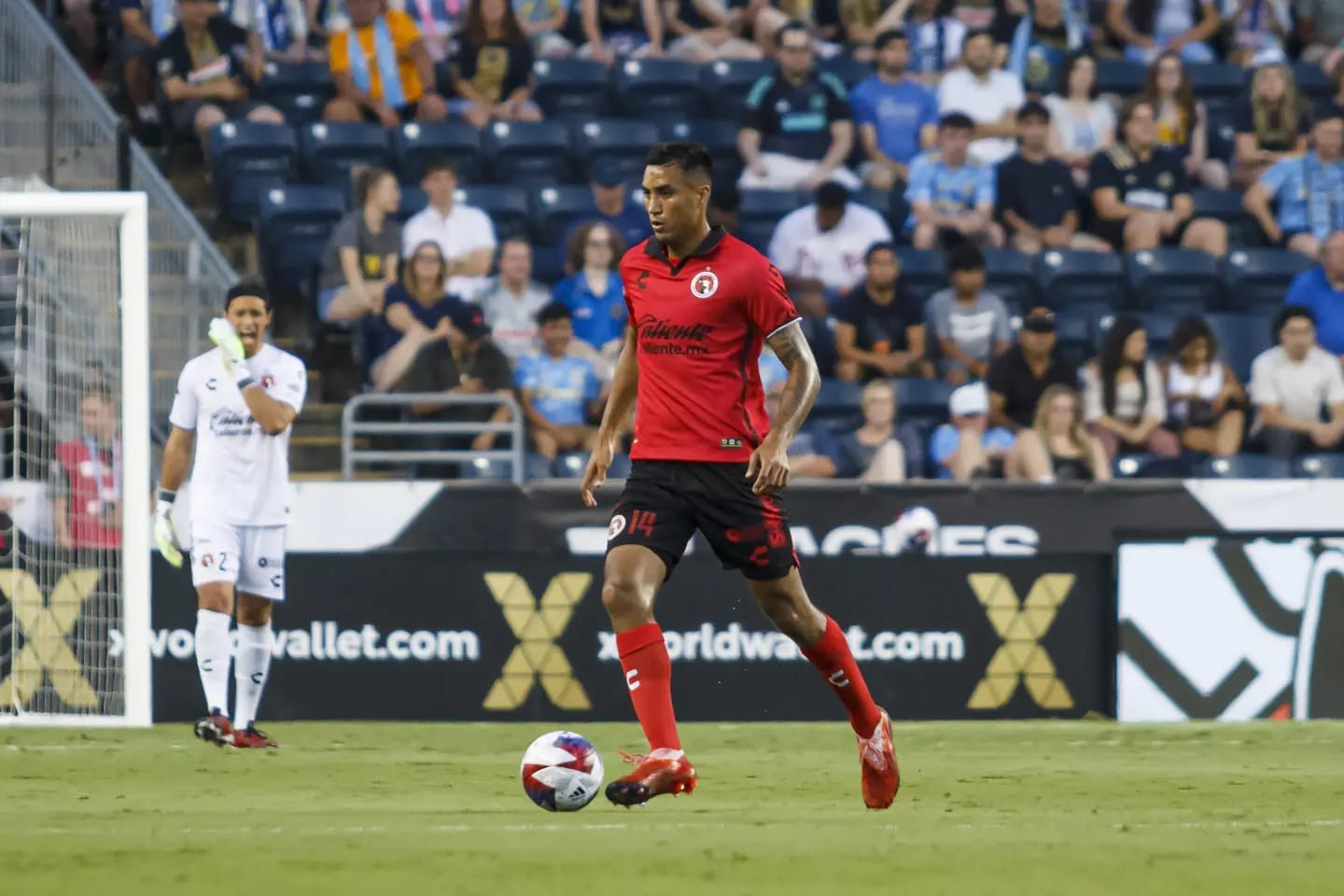

Personal information
- Full name: Christian Hernando Rivera Cuéllar
- Date of birth: 14 January 1996 (age 30)
- Place of birth: Cali, Colombia
- Height: 6 ft 1 in (1.85 m)
- Position: Midfielder

Team information
- Current team: Pachuca
- Number: 16

Youth career
- 2012–2016: Deportivo Cali

Senior career*
Years	Team	Apps	(Gls)
2016	Deportivo Cali	10	(0)
2016–2017	Deportivo Pasto	32	(2)
2017–2020	Deportivo Cali	70	(4)
2020	→ Tijuana (loan)	23	(0)
2021–2025	Tijuana	117	(13)
2023	→ Querétaro (loan)	16	(1)
2025	Sport Recife	39	(0)
2026–	Pachuca	13	(1)
- * Club domestic league appearances and goals as of 15 December 2025

Christian Hernando Rivera Cuéllar (born 14 January 1996) is a Colombian professional footballer who plays as a midfielder for Liga MX club Pachuca.

== Club career ==
=== Early career ===
Born in Cali, Rivera is the son of Hernando and Yenny. He began playing football at age four at the Universidad Santiago de Cali, where his mother worked as a teacher. When Rivera turned nine, he joined the Sarmiento Lora academy where he had to balance his football training and studies. In 2012, Rivera was selected from three players at Sarmiento Lora, including future first team teammate Alveiro Sánchez, to join local club Deportivo Cali.

=== Colombia ===
Rivera made his professional debut for Cali on 17 February 2016 against Fortaleza. He came on as a late stoppage time substitute as Cali won 1–0. Midway through the 2016 season, at the start of the Torneo Finalización, Rivera joined Deportivo Pasto, making his debut on 10 July against Boyacá Chicó as a halftime substitute in the 2–0 victory.

The next season, on 3 February 2017, Rivera scored his first professional goal for Pasto against Cortuluá. His 89th-minute goal was the fourth in a 4–0 victory. Prior to the second half of the season, Rivera returned to Deportivo Cali, making his debut on 5 July 2017 against Cúcuta Deportivo. On 26 July, Rivera scored a brace for Cali against Cúcuta Deportivo in the second leg of the Copa Colombia in a 3–1 victory.

During the 2019 season, Rivera finished as the top goalscorer in the Copa Colombia where he led Deportivo Cali to final against Independiente Medellín.

=== Tijuana ===
On 3 January 2020, Rivera joined Liga MX club Tijuana on loan with a purchase option. He made his debut for the club on 10 January 2020 against Santos Laguna, coming on as a 58th-minute substitute in a 2–1 victory. Prior to the Torneo Guardianes 2021, Rivera joined Tijuana on a permanent basis.

== Career statistics ==
As of match played on 27 April 2024

Appearances and goals by club, season and competition
Club	Season	League			Cup		Continental		Other		Total	
Club	Season	Division	Apps	Goals	Apps	Goals	Apps	Goals	Apps	Goals	Apps	Goals
Deportivo Cali	2016	Categoría Primera A	10	0	0	0	3	0	—		13	0
Deportivo Pasto	2016	Categoría Primera A	14	0	2	0	—		—		16	0
Deportivo Pasto	2017	Categoría Primera A	18	2	4	0	—		—		22	2
Deportivo Pasto	Total		32	2	6	0	—		—		38	2
Deportivo Cali	2017	Categoría Primera A	10	0	3	2	—		—		13	2
Deportivo Cali	2018	Categoría Primera A	16	2	2	0	2	0	—		20	2
Deportivo Cali	2019	Categoría Primera A	44	4	7	3	4	0	—		55	7
Deportivo Cali	Total		70	6	12	5	6	0	—		88	11
Tijuana	2019–20	Liga MX	10	0	6	1	—		—		16	1
Tijuana	2020–21	Liga MX	30	0	—		—		—		30	0
Tijuana	2021–22	Liga MX	32	1	—		—		—		32	1
Tijuana	2022–23	Liga MX	12	0	—		—		2	0	14	0
Tijuana	2023–24	Liga MX	32	7	—		—		1	0	33	7
Tijuana	Total		116	8	6	1	—		3	0	125	9
Querétaro (loan)	2022–23	Liga MX	16	1	—		—		—		16	1
Career total			244	17	24	6	9	0	3	0	280	23
