= Bolivian National Road Championships =

National road cycling championships in Bolivia

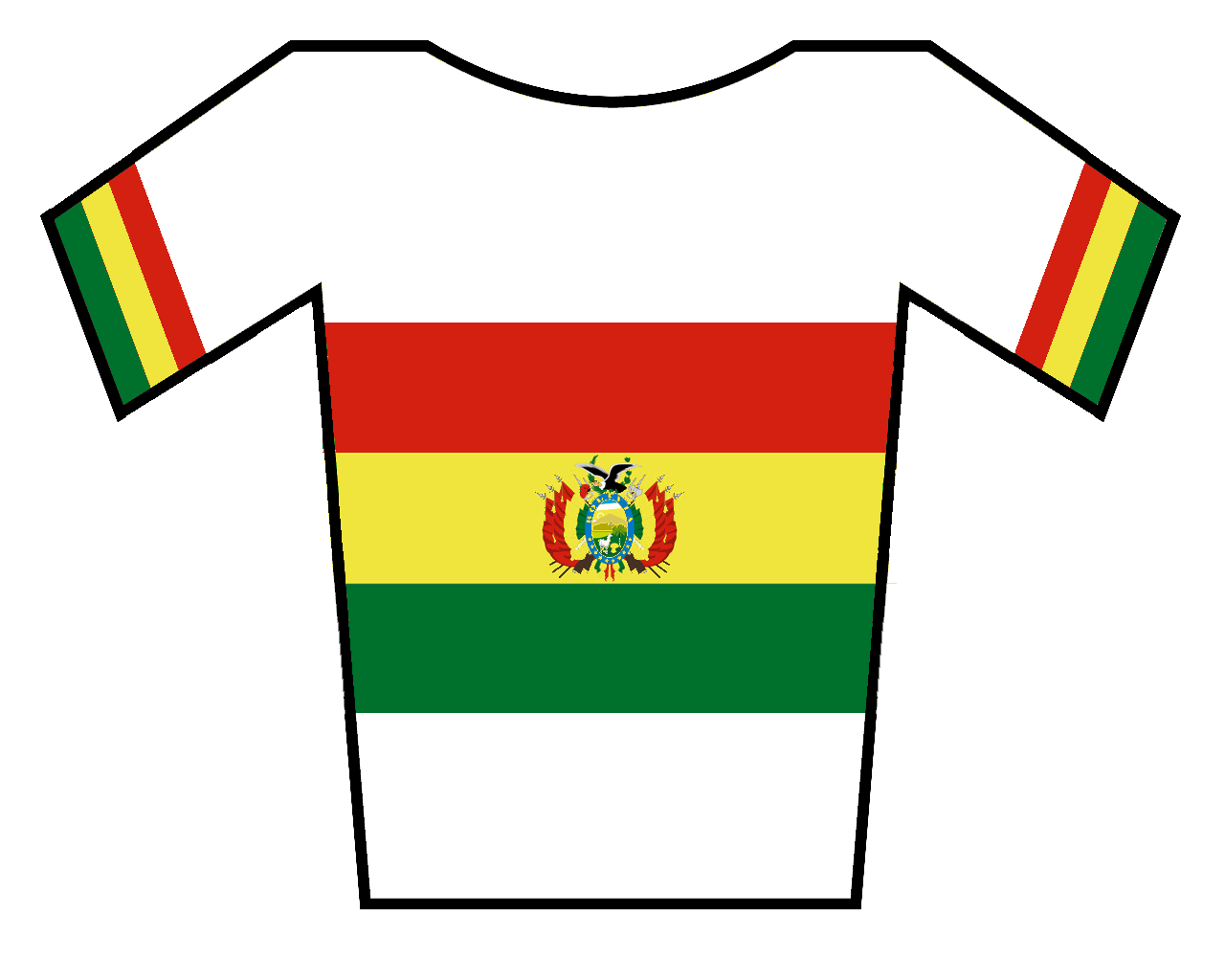

Race details
- Discipline: Road
- Type: One-day race

The Bolivian National Road Championships are held annually to decide the cycling champions in both the road race and time trial discipline, across various categories.

== Men ==
=== Road race ===
Year	Winner	Second	Third
2002	Genaro Agosto	Raoul Escobar	Hermino Cortez
2003	–
2004	Ruben Velasquez	Horacio Gallardo	Heriberto Acosta	2005	Horacio Gallardo	Yamil Carlos Montaño	Sandro Rodriguez
2006	Yamil Carlos Montaño	Juan Cotumba	Arnold Zapata
2007	Horacio Gallardo	Javier Prieto	Heriberto Acosta
2008	Horacio Gallardo	Sandro Rodriguez	Alberto Maizares
2009	Horacio Gallardo	Óscar Soliz	Juan Cotumba
2010	Óscar Soliz	Juan Cotumba	Jorge Quispe
2011	Víctor Tarqui	Gilver Zurita	Samuel Alaka
2012	Horacio Gallardo	Heriberto Acosta	Óscar Soliz
2013	Gilver Zurita	Juan Cotumba	Justino Quispe
2014	Óscar Soliz	Juan Cotumba	Piter Campero
2015	Óscar Soliz	Bacilio Ramos	Gilver Zurita
2016	Óscar Soliz	Horacio Gallardo	Bacilio Ramos
2017	Bacilio Ramos	Javier Arando	Gilver Zurita
2018	Carlos Montellano	Horacio Gallardo	Javier Arando
2019	Bernardo Leon	William Rodriguez	David Rojas
2021	William Rodriguez	Óscar Soliz	Gilver Zurita
2022	David Rojas	Horacio Gallardo	Robin Ortiz

=== Time Trial ===
Year	Winner	Second	Third
2002	Raul Escobar	Arnold Zapata	Herminio Cortez
2003
2004
2005
2006	Juan Cotumba	Yamil Carlos Montaño	Marcelo Rivera
2007	Alberto Maizares	Yamil Carlos Montaño	Jhonny Burgos
2008	Óscar Soliz	Alberto Maizares	Carlos Alarcon
2009	Arnold Zapata	Juan Carlos Cespedes	Jhonny David Acarapi
2010	Óscar Soliz	Juan Cotumba	Pedro Chambilla
2011	Óscar Soliz	Gilber Zurita	Juan Cotumba
2012	Óscar Soliz	Basílio Ramos	Ruben Ibañez
2013	Basílio Ramos	Gilber Zurita	Piter Campero
2014	Óscar Soliz	Gilber Zurita	Basílio Ramos
2015	Óscar Soliz	Gilber Zurita	Basílio Ramos
2016	Óscar Soliz	Freddy Gonzales	Basílio Ramos
2017	Javier Arando	Freddy Gonzales
2018	Javier Arando	Rene Daza	Basílio Ramos
2019	Basílio Ramos	Freddy Gonzales	David Rojas
2021	Freddy Gonzales	Óscar Soliz	Carlos Cristian Torrico
2022	Freddy Gonzales	David Rojas	Óscar Soliz
