= 2008 Vuelta a Colombia =

2007–08 UCI America Tour

Race details
- Dates: May 10–25, 2008
- Stages: 14
- Distance: 2,069.3 km (1,286 mi)
- Winning time: 50h 26' 36"

Results
| Jersey awarded to the overall winner | Winner | Giovanny Báez (COL) | (Une Orbitel) |
| | Second | Hernán Buenahora (COL) | (Lotería de Boyacá) |
| | Third | Mauricio Ortega (COL) | (Lotería de Boyacá) |
| | Points | Óscar Sevilla (ESP) | (Rock Racing) |
| | Mountains | Fabio Montenegro (COL) | (Blanco del Valle) |
| | Youth | Darwin Atapuma (COL) | (Indeportes Antioquia) |
| | Team | Lotería de Boyacá | |

The 2008 Vuelta a Colombia, the competition's 58th edition, was held from May 10 to May 25, 2008. Colombia's Giovanny Báez was crowned champion after 50 hours, 25 minutes and 55 seconds or riding through the plains and mountains of Colombia. The last stage, an urban race through the streets of Cali, was won by Artur García. The 27-year-old Báez was the 33rd cyclist to win the Tour of Colombia.

== Stages ==
=== 2008-05-10: Barrancabermeja — Barrancabermeja (8.4 km) ===
| Place | Prologue | | General Classification | |
| Place | Name | Time | Name | Time |
|---|---|---|---|---|
| 1. | Santiago Botero (COL) | 09.53 | Santiago Botero (COL) | 27.44 |
| 2. | Víctor Hugo Peña (COL) | +0.07 | Víctor Hugo Peña (COL) | +0.07 |
| 3. | Óscar Sevilla (ESP) | +0.14 | Óscar Sevilla (ESP) | +0.14 |

=== 2008-05-11: Barrancabermeja — Bucaramanga (146.9 km) ===
| Place | Stage 1 | | General Classification | |
| Place | Name | Time | Name | Time |
|---|---|---|---|---|
| 1. | Artur García Rincón (VEN) | 4:00.09 | Carlos Ospina (COL) | 4:10.27 |
| 2. | Rafael Montiel (COL) | — | Artur García Rincón (VEN) | +0.07 |
| 3. | Oscar Álvarez (COL) | +0.04 | Oscar Álvarez (COL) | +0.10 |

=== 2008-05-12: Piedecuesta — El Socorro (136.4 km) ===
| Place | Stage 2 | | General Classification | |
| Place | Name | Time | Name | Time |
|---|---|---|---|---|
| 1. | Jhon García (COL) | 3:37.10 | Carlos Ospina (COL) | 7:47.37 |
| 2. | Óscar Sevilla (ESP) | — | Oscar Álvarez (COL) | +0.10 |
| 3. | Franklin Chacón (VEN) | — | Rafael Montiel (COL) | +0.23 |

=== 2008-05-13: El Socorro — Tunja (169.5 km) ===
| Place | Stage 3 | | General Classification | |
| Place | Name | Time | Name | Time |
|---|---|---|---|---|
| 1. | Santiago Ojeda (COL) | 4:39.17 | Carlos Ospina (COL) | 12:30.37 |
| 2. | Juan Pablo Wilches (COL) | +3.31 | Santiago Ojeda (COL) | +0.04 |
| 3. | Edwin Parra (COL) | +3.42 | Oscar Álvarez (COL) | +0.10 |

=== 2008-05-14: Tunja — La Vega (192 km) ===
| Place | Stage 4 | | General Classification | |
| Place | Name | Time | Name | Time |
|---|---|---|---|---|
| 1. | Jefferson Vargas (COL) | 4:20.02 | Wilson Cepeda (COL) | 16:52.11 |
| 2. | Wilson Cepeda (COL) | — | Iván Casas (COL) | +1.45 |
| 3. | Miguel Ángel Díaz (COL) | +0.02 | Giovanny Báez (COL) | +2.02 |

=== 2008-05-15: San Francisco — La Dorada (135 km) ===
| Place | Stage 5 | | General Classification | |
| Place | Name | Time | Name | Time |
|---|---|---|---|---|
| 1. | Edgar Fonseca (COL) | 3:11.26 | Wilson Cepeda (COL) | 20:03.33 |
| 2. | Jhon García (COL) | +0.26 | Iván Casas (COL) | +2.15 |
| 3. | Óscar Sevilla (ESP) | — | Giovanny Báez (COL) | +2.32 |

=== 2008-05-16: Doradal — El Santuario (115.3 km) ===
| Place | Stage 6 | | General Classification | |
| Place | Name | Time | Name | Time |
|---|---|---|---|---|
| 1. | Rafael Montiel (COL) | 3:21.10 | Wilson Cepeda (COL) | 23:28.13 |
| 2. | Oscar Álvarez (COL) | +0.47 | Alejandro Ramírez (COL) | +0.05 |
| 3. | Graciano Fonseca (COL) | — | Rafael Montiel (COL) | +1.14 |

=== 2008-05-17: Río Negro — La Unión (163.6 km) ===
| Place | Stage 7 | | General Classification | |
| Place | Name | Time | Name | Time |
|---|---|---|---|---|
| 1. | Víctor Hugo Peña (COL) | 3:51.32 | Wilson Cepeda (COL) | 27:23.17 |
| 2. | Edwin Orozco (COL) | +0.18 | Alejandro Ramírez (COL) | +0.05 |
| 3. | Wilson Marentes (COL) | +0.36 | Rafael Montiel (COL) | +1.14 |

=== 2008-05-18: Medellín — Santa Elena (31 km) ===
| Place | Stage 8 (Individual Time Trial) | | General Classification | |
| Place | Name | Time | Name | Time |
|---|---|---|---|---|
| 1. | Hernán Buenahora (COL) | 57.45 | Giovanny Báez (COL) | 28:22.58 |
| 2. | Giovanny Báez (COL) | +0.36 | Alejandro Ramírez (COL) | +1.31 |
| 3. | Víctor Niño (COL) | +0.51 | Hernán Buenahora (COL) | +2.19 |

=== 2008-05-20: Caldas — Manizales (173 km) ===
| Place | Stage 9 | | General Classification | |
| Place | Name | Time | Name | Time |
|---|---|---|---|---|
| 1. | Óscar Sevilla (ESP) | 3:37.50 | Giovanny Báez (COL) | 32:00.49 |
| 2. | Juan Diego Ramírez (COL) | — | Alejandro Ramírez (COL) | +1.31 |
| 3. | Mauricio Ortega (COL) | — | Hernán Buenahora (COL) | +2.18 |

=== 2008-05-21: Manizales — Mariquita (176.8 km) ===
| Place | Stage 10 | | General Classification | |
| Place | Name | Time | Name | Time |
|---|---|---|---|---|
| 1. | Diego Calderón (COL) | 3:09.47 | Giovanny Báez (COL) | 35:11.00 |
| 2. | Juan Pablo Wilches (COL) | +1.06 | Alejandro Ramírez (COL) | +1.31 |
| 3. | Óscar Sevilla (ESP) | +1.09 | Hernán Buenahora (COL) | +2.18 |

=== 2008-05-22: Mariquita — La Linéa (176.8 km) ===
| Place | Stage 11 | | General Classification | |
| Place | Name | Time | Name | Time |
|---|---|---|---|---|
| 1. | Hernán Buenahora (COL) | 5:04.44 | Giovanny Báez (COL) | 40:16.37 |
| 2. | Mauricio Ortega (COL) | +0.05 | Hernán Buenahora (COL) | +2.00 |
| 3. | Giovanny Báez (COL) | +0.12 | Mauricio Ortega (COL) | +3.14 |

=== 2008-05-23: Quimbaya — Pereira (158.2 km) ===
| Place | Stage 12 | | General Classification | |
| Place | Name | Time | Name | Time |
|---|---|---|---|---|
| 1. | Wilson Marentes (COL) | 4:04.16 | Giovanny Báez (COL) | 44:22.18 |
| 2. | Camilo Gómez (COL) | — | Hernán Buenahora (COL) | +2.00 |
| 3. | Edgar Fonseca (COL) | — | Mauricio Ortega (COL) | +3.14 |

=== 2008-05-24: Cartago — Cali (190.4 km) ===
| Place | Stage 13 | | General Classification | |
| Place | Name | Time | Name | Time |
|---|---|---|---|---|
| 1. | César Salazar (VEN) | — | Giovanny Báez (COL) | 48:18.20 |
| 2. | Oscar Álvarez (COL) | — | Hernán Buenahora (COL) | +2.00 |
| 3. | Wilson Marentes (COL) | — | Mauricio Ortega (COL) | +3.14 |

=== 2008-05-25: Cali — Cali (96 km) ===
| Place | Stage 14 | | General Classification | |
| Place | Name | Time | Name | Time |
|---|---|---|---|---|
| 1. | Artur García (VEN) | 2:07.35 | Giovanny Báez (COL) | 50:25.55 |
| 2. | Andres Miguel Díaz (COL) | — | Hernán Buenahora (COL) | +2.00 |
| 3. | Jhon García (COL) | — | Mauricio Ortega (COL) | +3.14 |

== Final classification ==
| RANK | NAME | TEAM | TIME |
|---|---|---|---|
| 1. | Giovanny Báez (COL) | Une Orbitel | 50:25:55 |
| 2. | Hernán Buenahora (COL) | Lotería de Boyacá | + 2.00 |
| 3. | Mauricio Ortega (COL) | Une Orbitel | + 3.14 |
| 4. | Alejandro Ramírez (COL) | GW Shimano-EPM | + 3.29 |
| 5. | Diego Calderón (COL) | Blanco del Valle Frugos | + 4.36 |
| 6. | Víctor Niño (COL) | Coordinadora-EBSA | + 5.24 |
| 7. | Juan Diego Ramírez (COL) | GW Shimano | + 5.33 |
| 8. | Iván Parra (COL) | Colombia es Pasión | + 7.02 |
| 9. | Óscar Sevilla (ESP) | Rock Racing | + 7.45 |
| 10. | Francisco Colorado (COL) | GW Shimano | + 8.27 |

== See also ==
- 2008 Clásico RCN
