= Horacio Gallardo =

Bolivian cyclist (born 1981)

Personal information
- Full name: Horacio Gallardo Burgos
- Nickname: Torpedo
- Born: May 29, 1981 (age 45) Tarija, Bolivia
- Height: 1.68 m (5 ft 6 in)
- Weight: 59 kg (130 lb)

Cycling career
- Sport: Cycling
- Current team: GLAS Casa Real Campos de Solana
- Discipline: Road
- Role: Rider
- Rider type: Sprinter

Amateur team
- 2012–2018: GLAS Casa Real Campos de Solana

Professional team
- 2018: Start Team Gusto

Major wins
- National Road Race Championships (2005, 2007, 2008, 2009, 2012)

Horacio Gallardo Burgos (born May 29, 1981) is a Bolivian former professional road bicycle racer. He competed in the men's individual road race at the 2008 Summer Olympics.More than 80 times gold medal in road and track races national championships. Record holder in individual and team pursuit and team sprint. Considered the best one day races rider of his country. Most road national race winner with 5 titles.

== Major results ==
2005
1st Road race, National Road Championships
2007
1st Road race, National Road Championships
Doble Sucre Potosí GP Cemento Fancesa

1st Points classification
1st Stage 1

1st Stage 2 Doble Copacabana GP Fides
2008
1st Road race, National Road Championships
2009
9th Overall Vuelta a Bolivia

1st Stage 9

2011
1st Points classification, Vuelta a Bolivia
2012
1st Road race, National Road Championships
1st Stage 5 Vuelta a Bolivia
2013
1st Points classification, Vuelta a Bolivia
2016
2nd Road race, National Road Championships
2018
2nd Road race, National Road Championships
