= Wilson Marentes =

Colombian cyclist

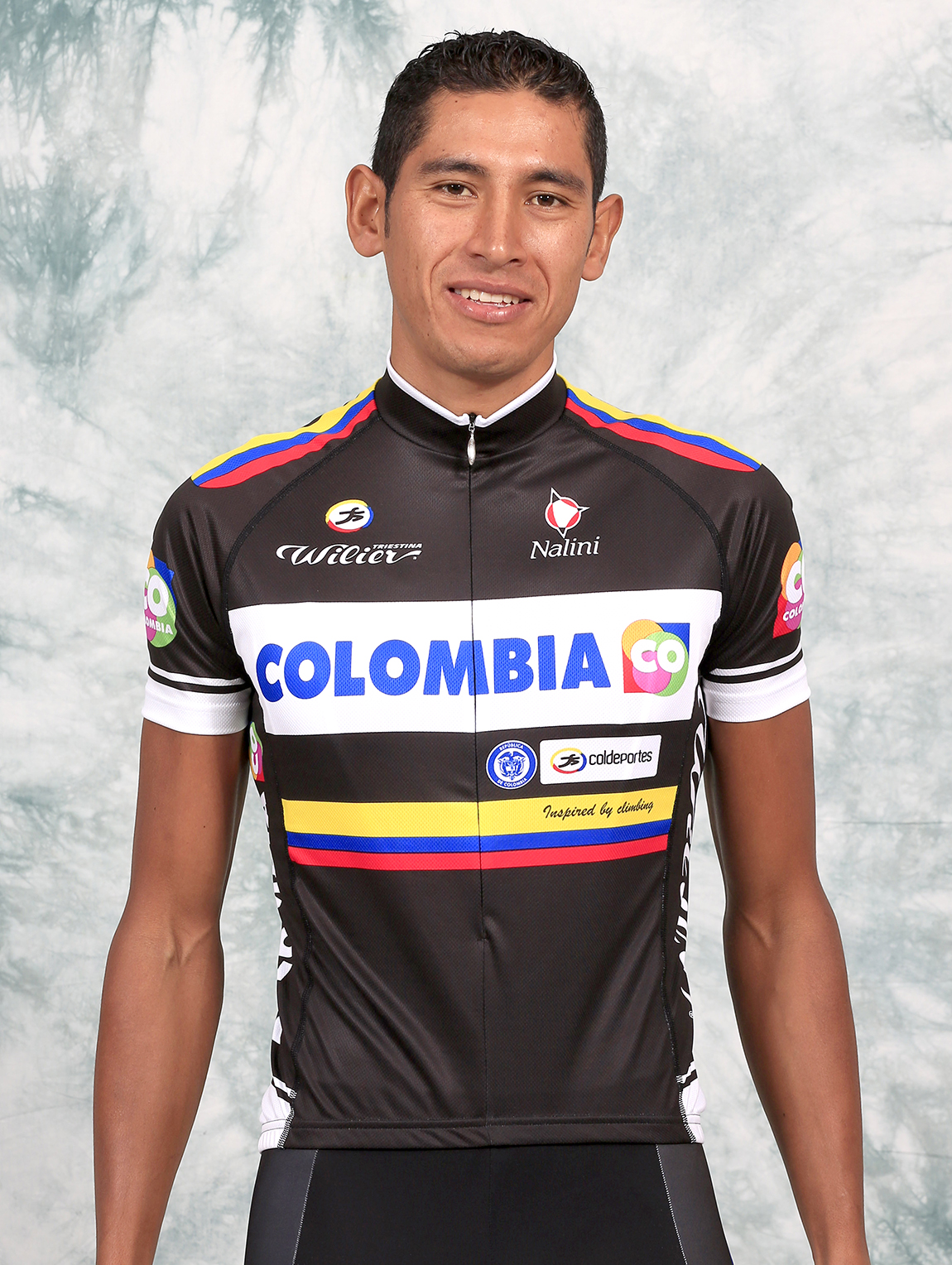

Personal information
- Full name: Wilson Alexander Marentes Torres
- Born: August 8, 1985 (age 41) Facatativá, Colombia

Cycling career
- Sport: Cycling
- Current team: Formesán-Bogotá Humana-ETB
- Discipline: Road
- Role: Rider

Amateur team
- 2014: Formesán-Bogotá Humana-ETB

Professional teams
- 2007-2009: Colombia es Pasión
- 2012-2013: Colombia

Wilson Alexander Marentes Torres (born 8 August 1985 in Facatativá) is a Colombian cyclist riding for Formesán-Bogotá Humana-ETB. He rode in the 2013 Giro d'Italia, and finished in 162nd place.

== Palmares ==
2006
1st stages 4 and 5 Vuelta a Guatemala
2007
National U23 Time trial Champion
2008
1st stage 12 Vuelta a Colombia
2011
2nd Colombian National Time Trial Championships
2014
1st stage 6b Vuelta a la Independencia Nacional
