= Freddy Montaña =

Colombian road cyclist

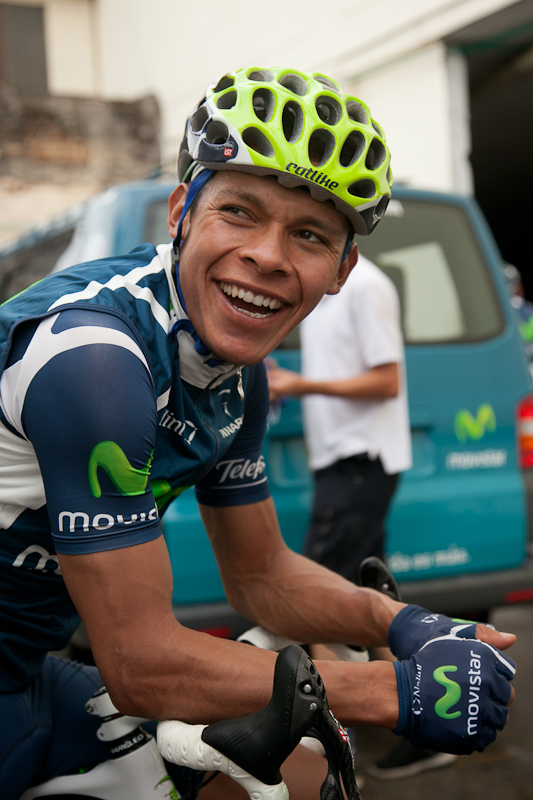
- Montaña in 2012

Personal information
- Full name: Freddy Emir Montaña Cadena
- Born: 23 November 1982 (age 43) Aquitania, Boyacá, Colombia

Cycling career
- Sport: Cycling
- Current team: Nu Colombia
- Discipline: Road
- Role: Rider
- Rider type: Climber

Amateur teams
- 2005–2006: Loteria de Boyaca
- 2010–2011: Boyacá Orgullo de America
- 2013–2014: Movistar Team América
- 2016: Indeportes–IMRD Cota

Professional teams
- 2007: Boyaca es para Vivirla–Marche
- 2009: Boyaca es para Vivirla
- 2012: Movistar Continental Team
- 2015: Movistar Team América
- 2017–: EPM
Medal record
Men's road bicycle racing
Representing Colombia
Pan American Championships
Bronze medal – third place	2010 Aguascalientes	Time trial

Freddy Emir Montaña Cadena (born November 23, 1982, in Aquitania, Boyacá) is a Colombian road cyclist, who currently rides for UCI Continental team Nu Colombia.

== Major results ==
2005
10th Overall Doble Copacabana Grand Prix Fides

1st Stage 3 (TTT)

2006
2nd Overall Doble Copacabana Grand Prix Fides
6th Overall Doble Sucre Potosí GP Cemento Fancesa
2008
3rd Clásica Internacional de Bogotá
2009
1st Overall Vuelta a Boyacá

1st Stage 3

2nd Overall Vuelta a Colombia
2nd Overall Vuelta Ciclista a León

1st Stage 4

3rd Clasica Alcaldía de Pasca
3rd Subida a Urkiola
2010
3rd Time trial, Pan American Road Championships
6th Overall Vuelta Mexico Telmex
7th Overall Vuelta a Colombia
2011
2nd Overall Vuelta Ciclista a Costa Rica

1st Stage 8 (ITT)

3rd Overall Vuelta a Colombia

1st Stage 15

7th Overall Vuelta Ciclista Chiapas
2012
8th Overall Vuelta a Colombia
2013
1st Stage 11 Vuelta a Colombia
2014
5th Overall Vuelta a Colombia
2017
1st Stage 1 (TTT) Vuelta a Colombia
2020
6th Overall Tour Colombia
