= Óscar Soliz =

Bolivian bicycle racer (born 1985)

Oscar Soliz
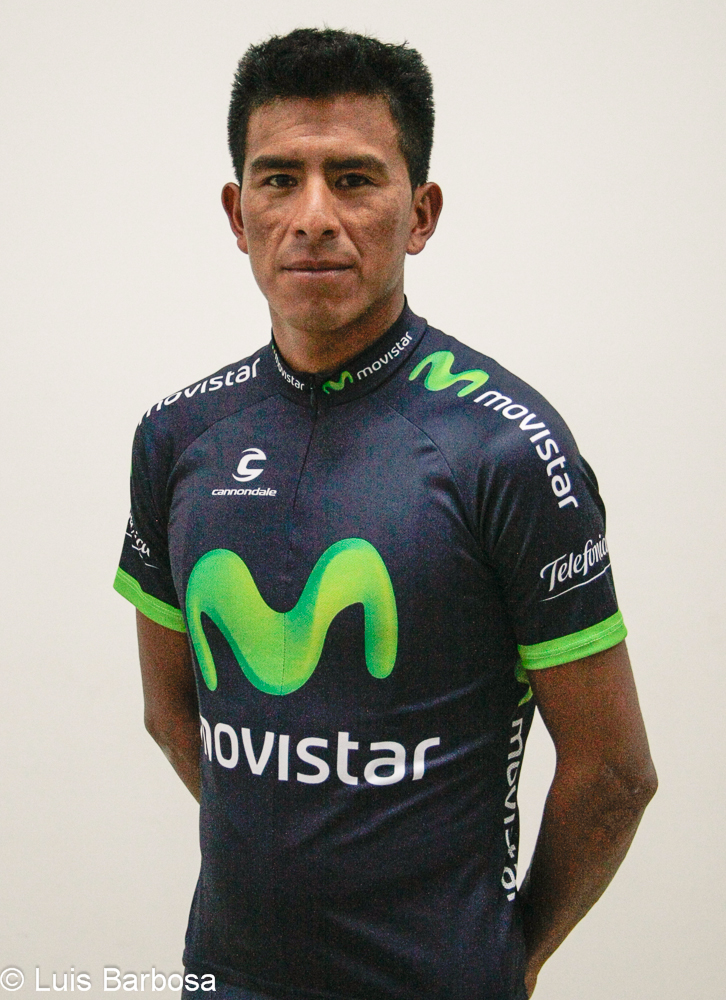
- Soliz in 2013.

Personal information
- Full name: Oscar Soliz Villca
- Born: 9 January 1985 (age 41) Villazón, Bolivia

Cycling career
- Sport: Cycling
- Current team: Potosí
- Discipline: Road
- Role: Rider
- Rider type: Climbing specialist

Amateur teams
- 2005: UCO Z Sport
- 2007–2008: EBSA–Coordinadora De Boyaca
- 2009: Pio Rico
- 2010: Boyaca Orgullo de America
- 2010: EBSA
- 2013–2014: Movistar Team América
- 2022–: Potosí

Professional teams
- 2011–2012: Movistar Continental Team
- 2015–2017: Movistar Team América

Major wins
- National Time Trial Championships (2008–2012, 2014–2016); National Road Race Championships (2010, 2014–2016)

Oscar Soliz (born 9 January 1985) is a Bolivian road racing cyclist, who rides for Bolivian amateur team Potosí. Between 2017 and 2021, Soliz was suspended from the sport after testing positive for continuous erythropoietin receptor activator (CERA) at the 2017 Vuelta a Colombia.

== Major results ==
2006
1st Mountains classification Doble Sucre Potosí GP Cemento Fancesa
7th Overall Doble Copacabana Grand Prix Fides

1st Mountains classification

2007
1st Overall Doble Sucre Potosí GP Cemento Fancesa

1st Mountains classification
1st Stage 2

1st Overall Vuelta al Lago Uru Uru

1st Stage 1

1st Overall Tour of Cochabamba
1st Overall Doble Copacabana Grand Prix Fides

1st Stage 4

2008
1st Time trial, National Road Championships
1st Stage 2 Tour of Cochabamba
2nd Overall Vuelta a Bolivia
2009
National Road Championships

1st Time trial
2nd Road race

1st Overall Tour of Tarija

1st Stages 1a & 3

1st Stage 1 GP Savina Cuellar
2nd Overall Tour of Cochabamba

1st Stage 3

2nd Overall Vuelta a Bolivia

1st Stages 6, 8 & 11 (ITT)

5th Overall Vuelta al Lago Uru Uru

1st Stage 2

6th Overall Doble Sucre Potosí GP Cemento Fancesa

1st Stage 3

2010
National Road Championships

1st Time trial
1st Road race

1st Overall Doble Sucre Potosí GP Cemento Fancesa

1st Stages 1, 2 & 5 (ITT)

1st Overall Tour of Chaco
1st Overall Vuelta al Lago Uru Uru

1st Prologue & Stage 2

1st Overall Tour of Cochabamba

1st Prologue, Stages 1 & 3

1st Overall Vuelta a Bolivia

1st Stages 4, 8 & 9 (ITT)

1st Overall Tour of Camargo

1st Stages 1, 3 & 5

2011
1st Time trial, National Road Championships
4th Overall Vuelta Ciclista a Costa Rica

1st Stage 12

5th Overall Tour of Cundinamarca
2012
National Road Championships

1st Time trial
3rd Road race

1st Overall Clasica International Tulcan

1st Stage 8

4th Overall Vuelta a Bolivia

1st Mountains classification
1st Stages 7, 9b & 10a (ITT)

5th Overall Vuelta a Boyacá
8th Overall Clásico RCN
2013
1st Overall Tour of Cotagaita
1st Overall Vuelta al Sur de Bolivia

1st Mountains classification
1st Points classification
1st Stages 1, 2 (ITT) & 3

1st Overall Tour of Cochabamba

1st Stage 2

2nd Overall Vuelta a Bolivia

1st Mountains classification
1st Stages 7 & 10a (ITT)

2014
National Road Championships

1st Time trial
1st Road race

1st Overall Clásico RCN

1st Stages 6 & 10

5th Time trial, South American Games
7th Overall Vuelta a Colombia
2015
National Road Championships

1st Time trial
1st Road race

1st Overall Vuelta a Chuquisaca

1st Stages 1 & 3

1st Stage 3 Vuelta a Cundinamarca
2016
National Road Championships

1st Time trial
1st Road race

2017
~~8th Overall Vuelta a Colombia~~
2022
3rd Time trial, National Road Championships
