= The Rumba Madre =

American band

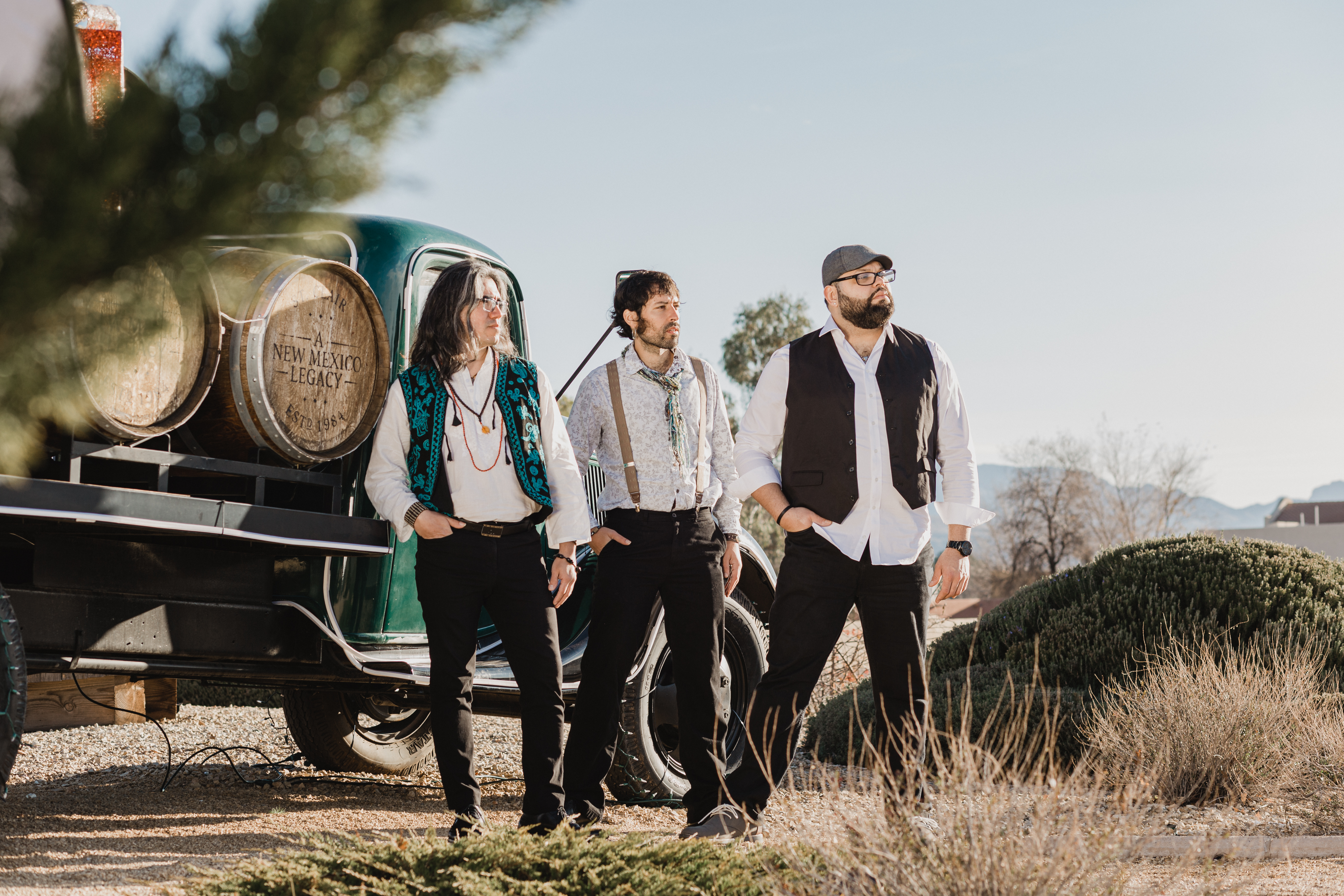

Background information
- Origin: Nashville, Tennessee, U.S.
- Genres: Latin - Flamenco - Urban - Fusion - Punk
- Years active: 2018-present
- Label: ONErpm
- Members: Benjamín Alejandro Delgado David Vila Diéguez Rubén Darío Gómez
- Website: rumbamadre.com'

The Rumba Madre, often abbreviated as TRM, is an American World and Latinx Alternative band formed in Nashville, Tennessee, in 2018. Their music is a mix of Latin-American and world music styles with punk, reggaetón, trap, and others. The name of the band is a play on words of the typical celebratory expression in Spanish “¡de puta madre!” The core of the band is formed by David Vila Diéguez (Galicia / Basque Country / Spain) Rubén Darío Gómez (Colombia), and Benjamín Alejandro Delgado (The Bronx / New York / Puerto Rico).

== History ==
In 2017, David Vila Diéguez and Rubén Darío Gómez decided to form their own original project. This project would be based around different Latin styles but with a strong presence of the rumba flamenca. They were approached by producer, engineer, and composer Ivan Gutiérrez Carrasquillo who told them that they had great potential and proposed them to record an album under his guidance so that he could then circulate it among his contacts in the US music industry. The Rumba Madre recorded their debut album Prisiones y Fugas, releasing the first single of the album, "La Rumba del Coco", on May 8, 2020. The video of "La Rumba del Coco" was also released on May 8, 2020. During the rest of 2020, they released various live "Quarantine Sessions" of the songs in Prisiones y Fugas from their homes. On October 10, 2020, they released a cover of The Beatles' song "Help" in Spanish for "Travel Tips for Aztlan" at KPFK 90.7 FM.

On March 5, 2021, they released a new single and video called "Tu Maldita Vida" featuring the Argentinian tango/trap/reggaeton artist Enrique Campos. That same year, on September 3, they released a remix of "La Rumba del Coco" featuring Asdru Sierra from the multicultural L.A. band Ozomatli. The following year, 2022, on March 18, they released a new single and video with L.A. artist Nancy Sánchez. In April 2025, they released a new single called "Abuela," which deals with the generational trauma created by the Spanish Civil War. "Abuela" was one of Billboard's picks for the month of June describing The Rumba Madre as one of the bands to have on the radar. That same month they released "¡Oh, San Juan! (Live from el Choliseo)", a song dealing with gentrification in Puerto Rico.

== Discography ==
=== Studio albums ===
2020

Prisiones y Fugas

=== Singles ===
2020

La Rumba del Coco

2021

Tu Maldita Vida

La Rumba del Coco Ft. Asdru Sierra (Ozomatli)

2022

Vivir Sin Ti (with Nancy Sánchez)

== Videos ==
Meet The Rumba Madre

La Rumba del Coco

Tu Maldita Vida

La Rumba del Coco Ft. Asdru Sierra (Ozomatli)

Vivir Sin Ti (with Nancy Sánchez)
