= Movistar Team (Continental Team) =

Team information
- UCI code: MOT
- Registered: Colombia
- Founded: 2011
- Disbanded: 2017
- Discipline: Road
- Status: Continental (2011–2012); National (2013–2014); UCI Continental (2015–2017)
- Bicycles: Guerciotti

Key personnel
- General manager: Libardo Leyton

Team name history
- 2011–2012 2013–2014 2015–2017: Movistar Continental Team; Movistar Team América; Movistar Team
Movistar Team jersey
Jersey

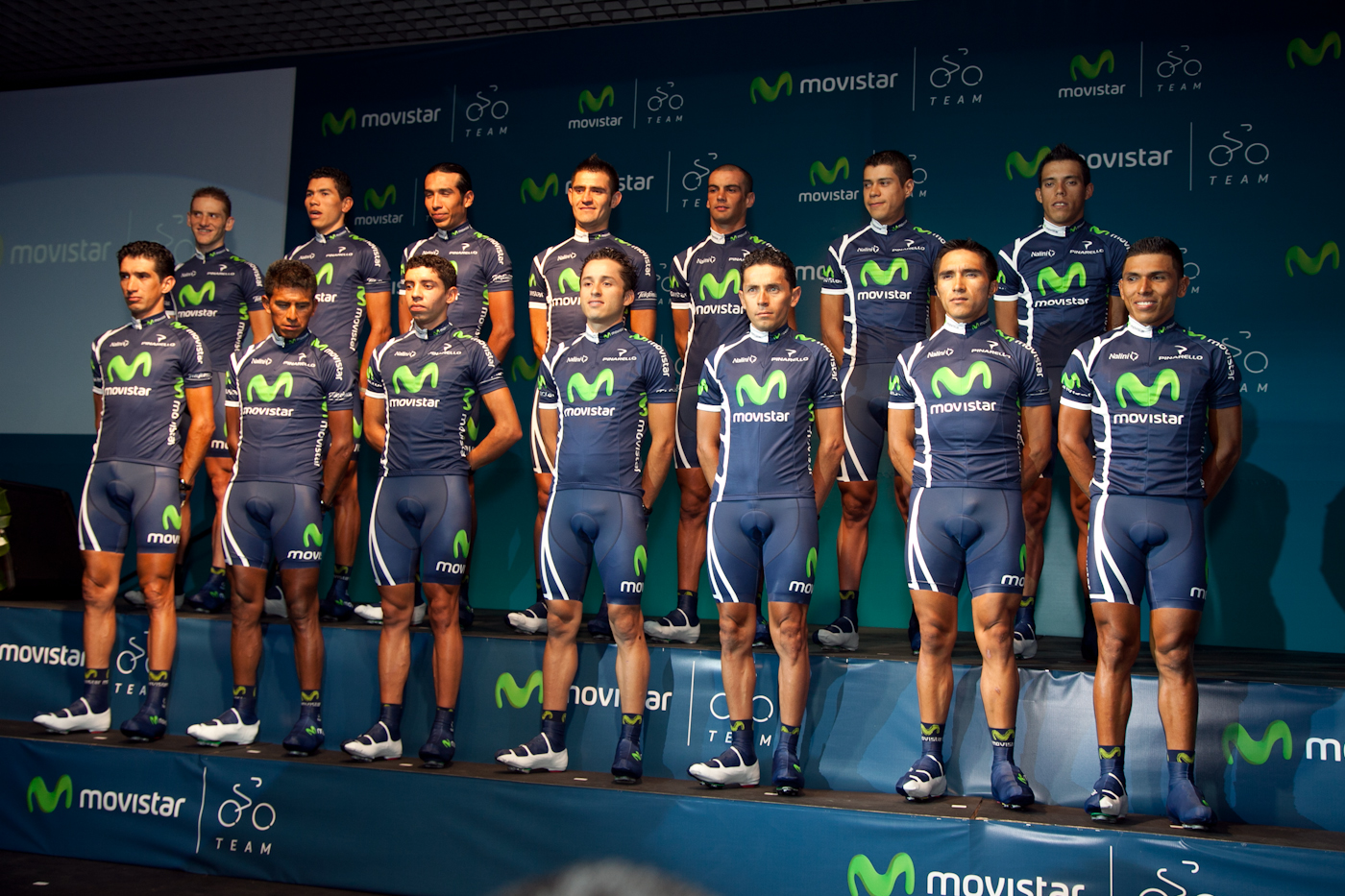

Movistar Team (Continental Team) (UCI Code MOT) was a Colombian UCI Continental cycling team.

== History ==
=== Creation ===
The team was set up in time for the 2011 season with Movistar sponsoring both the Continental team and Spanish UCI Pro Tour team to race in events on the UCI America Tour as well as those national events within its region. The team is based in Bogotá, Colombia, and the management team is headed by former Colombian coach Libardo Leyton

On 2 June, the squad was presented officially and on 12 June and started the Tour of Colombia, where Byron Guamá achieved the first official victory for the team.

=== Disappearance of the continental team ===
In two years the squad ran 7 races out of Colombia, being three in 2011 (Tour of Venezuela, Vuelta a Chiriquí and Tour of Costa Rica) and four in 2012 (Vuelta al Táchira Vuelta del Uruguay, Classic International Tulcán y Vuelta al Mundo Maya). Although the team's goal was to be part of the principal races of the Latin American calendar, this could not be accomplished for different reasons;, organizational, logistical, legal as well as geographical. Therefore, on October 22, 2012, it was announced that the team would disband in 2013, with the last race that the team would participate in being the Vuelta al Mundo Maya.

After the disappearance announced in January 2013, Movistar Colombia and Ecuador confirmed that they would unite forces to give continuity to the team but not linked to Movistar Team. With Bogotá as the team's headquarters and Libardo Leyton as general manager. The team was not registered with the UCI, becoming amateur and contesting races only in Colombia and Ecuador.

=== Resurgence of the continental team ===
For the 2015 season, the team now named Movistar Team, re-applied for UCI Continental status. with a roster of 10 cyclists, including the world champion para-cyclist Álvaro Galvis.

The team disbanded again after the 2017 season.

== Doping ==
On 28 November 2017 news broke that Óscar Soliz had tested positive for CERA at the 2017 Vuelta a Colombia.

== Team roster ==
As of 26 December 2015.

Rider	Date of birth
Jaime Castaneda (COL)	29 October 1986 (age 39)
Wilson Cepeda (COL)	2 September 1989 (age 37)
Yuber Contreras (COL)	3 July 1994 (age 32)
Alvaro Duarte (COL)	12 January 1991 (age 35)
Alvaro Galvis (COL)	25 January 1970 (age 56)
Luis Miguel Martinez (COL)	30 June 1993 (age 33)
Omar Mendoza (COL)	25 November 1989 (age 36)

Rider	Date of birth
Edwar Ortiz (COL)	8 December 1980 (age 45)
Brayan Ramírez (COL)	20 November 1992 (age 33)
Carlos Ramírez (COL)	26 October 1994 (age 31)
Edwin Sanchez (COL)	20 July 1981 (age 45)
Yors Santofimio (COL)	26 December 1995 (age 30)
Óscar Soliz (BOL)	19 January 1985 (age 41)
Cristian Talero (COL)	25 March 1990 (age 36)

== Major wins ==
2011
Stages 2b & 6 Vuelta a Colombia, Byron Guamá
Stage 11 Vuelta a Colombia, Fredy González
Stages 2, 8b, 11 & 12 Vuelta a Venezuela, Marvin Angarita
Stage Vuelta a Venezuela, Marvin Angarita
Stages 5 (ITT) & 11 Vuelta Ciclista a Costa Rica, Gregory Brenes
Stage 12 Vuelta Ciclista a Costa Rica, Óscar Soliz
Bolivia National Time Trial Championships, Óscar Soliz
Colombia Under-23 National Road Race Championships, Marvin Angarita
2012
Stage 8 Vuelta a Colombia, Byron Guamá
Stage 1 Vuelta Mundo Maya, Gregory Brenes
Stage 2 Vuelta Mundo Maya, Byron Guamá
Stage 3 Vuelta Mundo Maya, Alejandro Serna Toro
Stage 6 Vuelta Mundo Maya, Freddy Montaña
Bolivia National Time Trial Championships, Óscar Soliz
Panama National Time Trial Championships, Ramon Carretero
2013
Stages 2 & 10 Vuelta a Colombia, Byron Guamá
Stage 11 Vuelta a Colombia, Freddy Montaña
Bolivarian Games ITT, Brayan Ramírez
2014
Central American and Caribbean Games ITT, Brayan Ramírez
Bolivia National Time Trial Championships, Óscar Soliz
Bolivia National Road Race Championships, Óscar Soliz
2015
Bolivia National Time Trial Championships, Óscar Soliz
Bolivia National Road Race Championships, Óscar Soliz
2016
Colombia National Under-23 Time Trial Championships, Carlos Ramírez
Bolivia National Time Trial Championships, Óscar Soliz
Bolivia National Road Race Championships, Óscar Soliz

== National champions ==
2011
Bolivian Time Trial Championship, Óscar Soliz
Colombian U23 Road Race Championship, Marvin Angarita
2012
Bolivian Time Trial Championship, Óscar Soliz
Panamanian Time Trial Championship, Ramon Carretero
2014
Bolivian Road Race Championship, Óscar Soliz
Bolivian Time Trial Championship, Óscar Soliz
2015
Bolivian Road Race Championship, Óscar Soliz
Bolivian Time Trial Championship, Óscar Soliz
2016
Bolivian Road Race Championship, Óscar Soliz
Bolivian Time Trial Championship, Óscar Soliz
Colombian U23 Time Trial Championship, Carlos Ramírez
