= Juan Cotumba =

Bolivian cyclist

Personal information
- Full name: Juan Cotumba Coa
- Nickname: Cóndor
- Born: 17 December 1980 (age 45) Potosí, Bolivia

Cycling career
- Sport: Cycling
- Current team: Pío Rico Cycling Team
- Discipline: Road
- Role: Rider

Amateur teams
- 2009–2012: Pío Rico
- 2013–2014: Pollito Rico
- 2015: Pío Rico
- 2016: Ese–Tarija
- 2017–2018: Pollito Rico
- 2019–2020: Pío Rico

Professional teams
- 2009: Tecos UAG
- 2021–: Pío Rico Cycling Team

Juan Cotumba Coa (born January 21, 1980, in Potosí) is a Bolivian road bicycle racer, who currently rides for UCI Continental team Pío Rico Cycling Team. He is the winner of the 2011 Vuelta a Bolivia and 2014 Vuelta al Sur de Bolivia races.

== Doping ==
On 17 August 2014 Cotumba gave an adverse analytical finding for Furosemide and was subsequently banned for one year until 16 August 2015.

== Major results ==
2005
3rd Overall Doble Sucre Potosí GP Cemento Fancesa
2006
8th Overall Doble Sucre Potosí GP Cemento Fancesa
2009
3rd Overall Vuelta a Bolivia

1st Stage 5

4th Overall Doble Sucre Potosí GP Cemento Fancesa
2010
8th Overall Doble Sucre Potosí GP Cemento Fancesa
2011
1st Overall Vuelta a Bolivia

1st Mountains classification
1st Stages 5 & 6

2012
8th Overall Vuelta a Bolivia

1st Stage 8

2013
2nd Road race, National Road Championships
5th Overall Vuelta a Bolivia
6th Overall Vuelta al Sur de Bolivia
2014
~~1st Overall Vuelta al Sur de Bolivia~~
2nd Road race, National Road Championships
