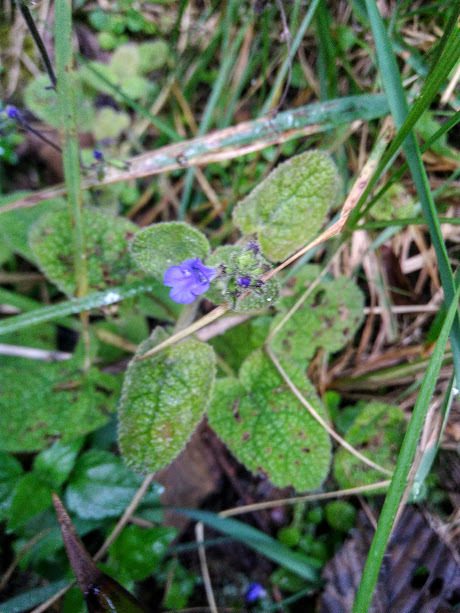

Scientific classification
- Kingdom: Plantae
- Clade: Tracheophytes
- Clade: Angiosperms
- Clade: Eudicots
- Clade: Asterids
- Order: Lamiales
- Family: Lamiaceae
- Genus: Salvia
- Species: S. palifolia

Binomial name
- Salvia palifolia Kunth

= Salvia palifolia =

Species of herb

Salvia palifolia is a decumbent perennial herb native to Colombia and western Venezuela, growing in grassland, cloud forest clearings, streamsides, and rocky outcrops from 1,600 to 3,500 m (5,200 to 11,500 ft) elevation. The 3 to 4 cm (1.2 to 1.6 in) long green leaves are hastate or cordate; the blue flowers are 5 to 6 mm (0.20 to 0.24 in) long.
