= Alveiro Sánchez =

Colombian footballer (born 1997)

Personal information
- Full name: Alveiro Sánchez Ramírez
- Date of birth: 18 November 1997 (age 28)
- Place of birth: La Tola, Nariño, Colombia
- Height: 1.68 m (5 ft 6 in)
- Position: Forward

Youth career
- 2011–2013: Carlos Sarmiento Lora
- 2013: → Deportivo Cali (loan)

Senior career*
Years	Team	Apps	(Gls)
2014–2018	Deportivo Cali	5	(0)
2016	→ Deportivo Pasto (loan)	6	(0)
2018	→ Orsomarso (loan)	8	(0)
Total		19	(0)

International career
2012	Colombia U15		
- * Club domestic league appearances and goals

Alveiro Sánchez Ramírez (born 18 November 1997) is a Colombian former footballer.

== Club career ==
Born in La Tola in the Nariño Department of Colombia, Sánchez began his footballing career in the academy of former footballer Carlos Sarmiento Lora at the age of thirteen. He later joined the academy of Deportivo Cali, initially on loan, and while progressing through the academy, he earned call-ups to the regional team of the Valle del Cauca Department. In the 2013 edition of the Campeonato Nacional Interclubes, Sánchez finished as top scorer, with thirty-six goals in thirty games as Deportivo Cali won the title.

He made his professional debut for Deportivo Cali on 10 March 2014, starting in an eventual 0–0 draw with Fortaleza C.E.I.F. in the Categoría Primera A. Later in the same year, he was named in English newspaper The Guardian as one of the most promising young footballers born in 1997.

In January 2015, he suffered a ruptured ACL injury, while ultimately stunted his development as a professional footballer. Despite this, he signed a new contract with the club in June of the same year.

In July 2016, having managed only two appearances (a total of six minutes) over the last two seasons, Sánchez was loaned to fellow Categoría Primera A side Deportivo Pasto.

On his return to Deportivo Cali, he scored his first, and only, goal in professional football in a 2017 Copa Colombia game against Orsomarso. He was loaned to Orsomarso the following year, managing eight Categoría Primera B appearances before a return to Deportivo Cali, where he decided to retire from professional football at the age of twenty-one.

== International career ==
Sánchez represented Colombia at under-15 level, first being called up in January 2012 for the Mundialito Tahuichi in Bolivia, where he went on to score five goals. He was called up to the Colombian under-20 side in April 2016 for a training camp.

== Career statistics ==
=== Club ===
Appearances and goals by club, season and competition
Club	Season	League			Cup		Other		Total	
Club	Season	Division	Apps	Goals	Apps	Goals	Apps	Goals	Apps	Goals
Deportivo Cali	2014	Categoría Primera A	3	0	1 (Note: Appearances in the Copa Colombia)	0	0	0	4	0
Deportivo Cali	2015	Categoría Primera A	1	0	0	0	0	0	1	0
Deportivo Cali	2016	Categoría Primera A	1	0	0	0	0	0	1	0
Deportivo Cali	2017	Categoría Primera A	0	0	2	1	0	0	2	1
Deportivo Cali	2018	Categoría Primera A	0	0	0	0	0	0	0	0
Deportivo Cali	Total		5	0	3	1	0	0	8	1
Deportivo Pasto (loan)	2016	Categoría Primera A	6	0	0	0	0	0	6	0
Orsomarso (loan)	2018	Categoría Primera B	8	0	2	0	0	0	10	0
Career total			19	0	5	1	0	0	24	1
