= Cucaita =

Coordinates: 5°32′N 73°27′W

- Municipality
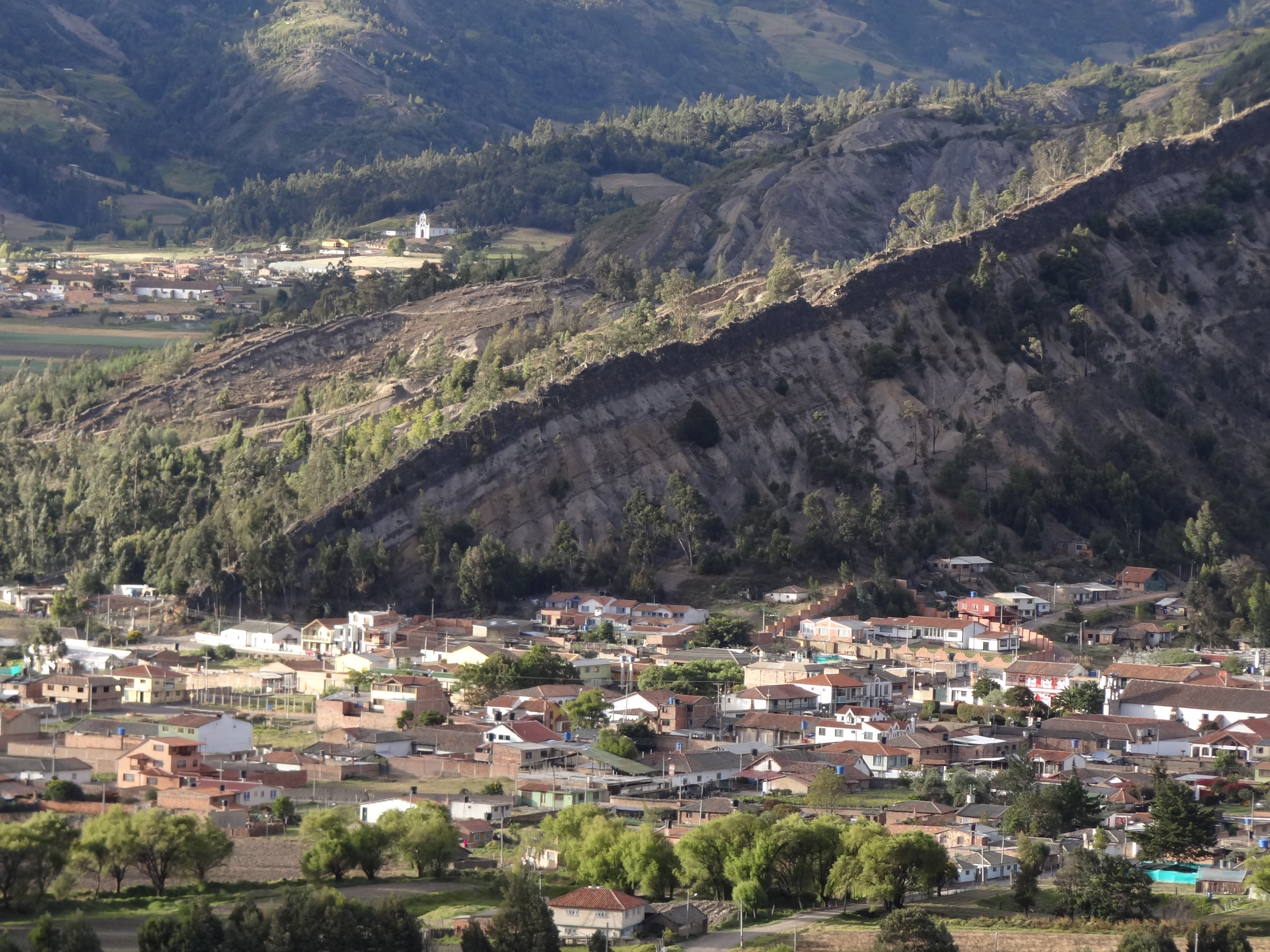
- View of Cucaita

- Flag Coat of arms

- Location of the municipality and town of Cucaita in the Boyacá Department of Colombia
- Country: Colombia
- Department: Boyacá Department
- Province: Central Boyacá Province
- Founded: 12 August 1556
- Founder: Juan de Los Barrios

Government
  - Mayor: Marcos Daniel Borda Parra (2024-2027)

Area
  - Municipality: 43.58 km^{2} (16.83 sq mi)
- Elevation: 2,650 m (8,690 ft)

Population (2015)
  - Municipality: 4,687
  - Density: 107.5/km^{2} (278.6/sq mi)
  - Urban: 1,905
- Time zone: UTC-5 (Colombia Standard Time)
- Website: Official website

Cucaita is a municipality in the Central Boyacá Province, part of Boyacá Department, Colombia. The urban centre is situated on the Altiplano Cundiboyacense at a distance of 20 kilometres (12 mi) from the department capital Tunja. Cucaita borders Sora in the north, Tunja in the east and south and Samacá in the south and west.

== Etymology ==
The name Cucaita is derived from Chibcha and means either "Seminary enclosure" or "Shade of the farming fields".

== History ==
The area of Cucaita in the times before the Spanish conquest was inhabited by the Muisca, organised in their loose Muisca Confederation. Cucaita was ruled by the zaque of nearby Hunza.

Modern Cucaita was founded on August 12, 1556 by friar Juan de Los Barrios.

== Economy ==
Main economical activities of Cucaita are agriculture (predominantly onions and peas), livestock farming and minor carbon mining.

== Born in Cucaita ==
- Rafael Antonio Niño, former professional cyclist

== Gallery ==
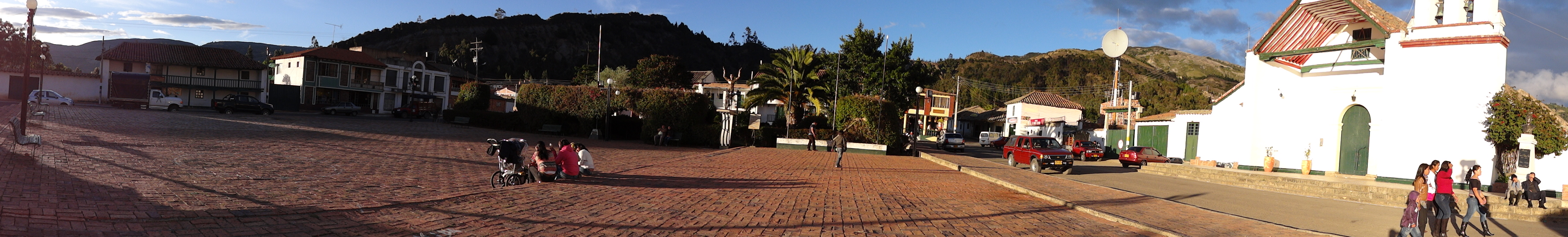
Panorama of central square of Cucaita
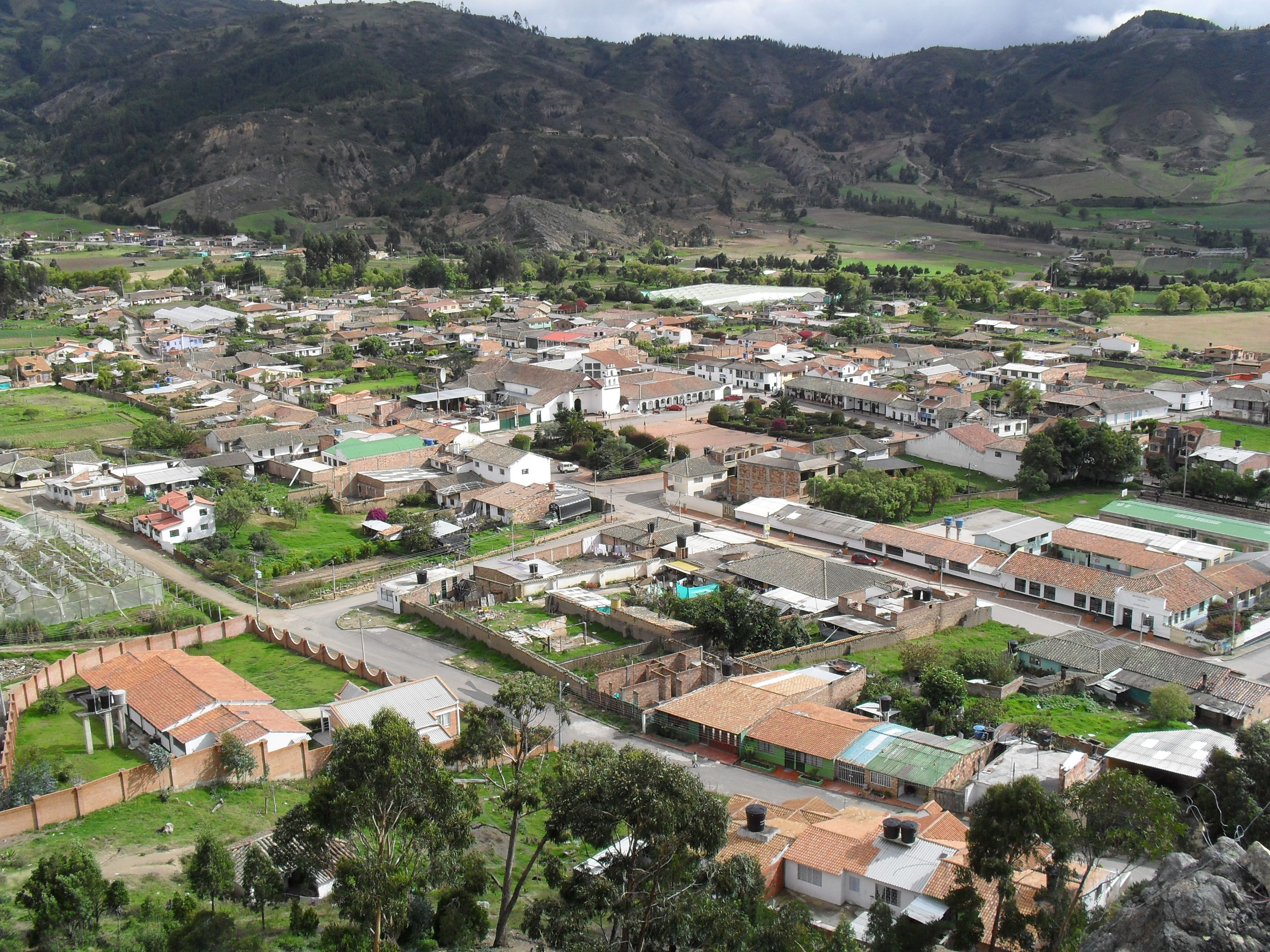
View of Cucaita

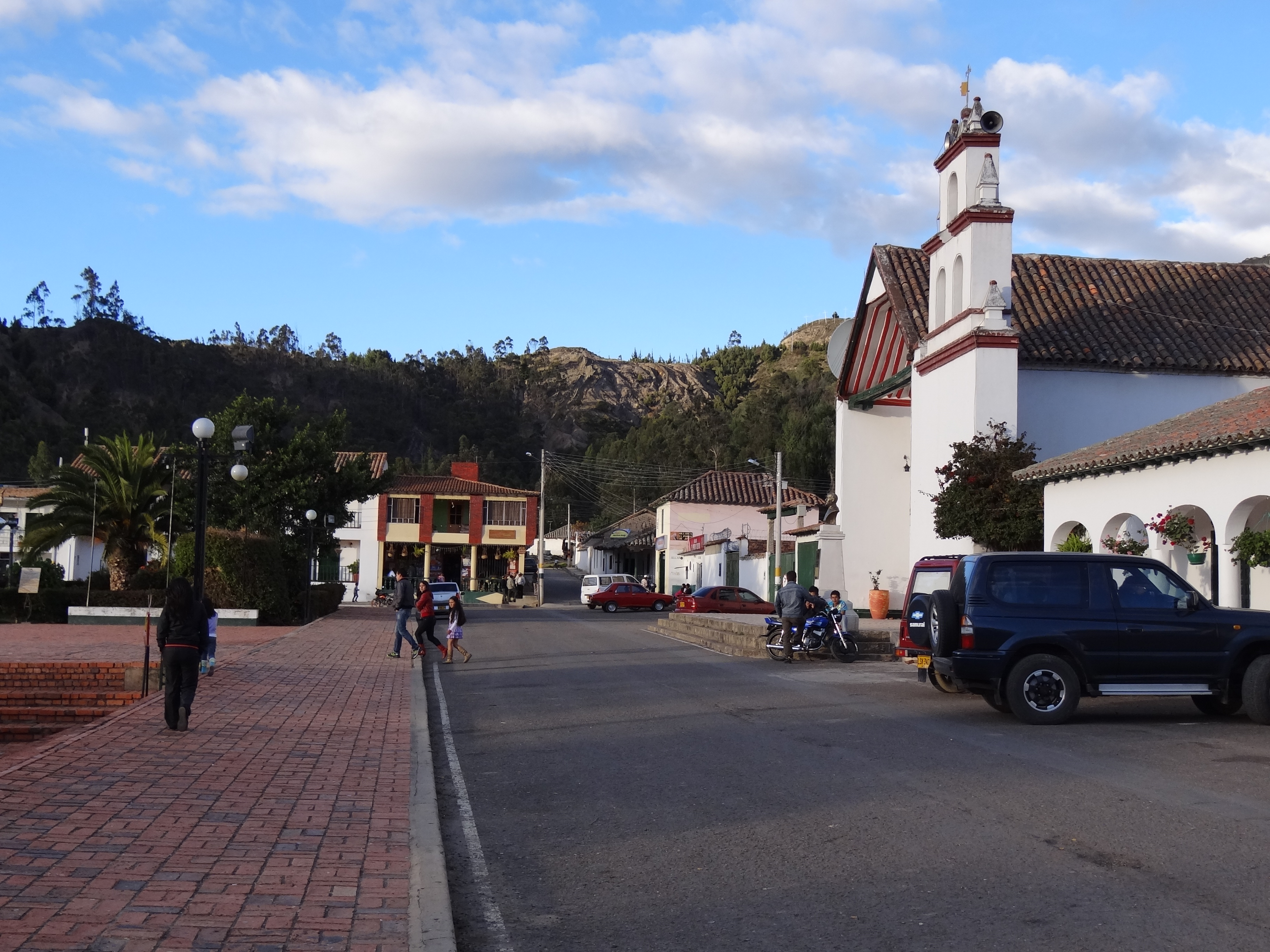
Central square

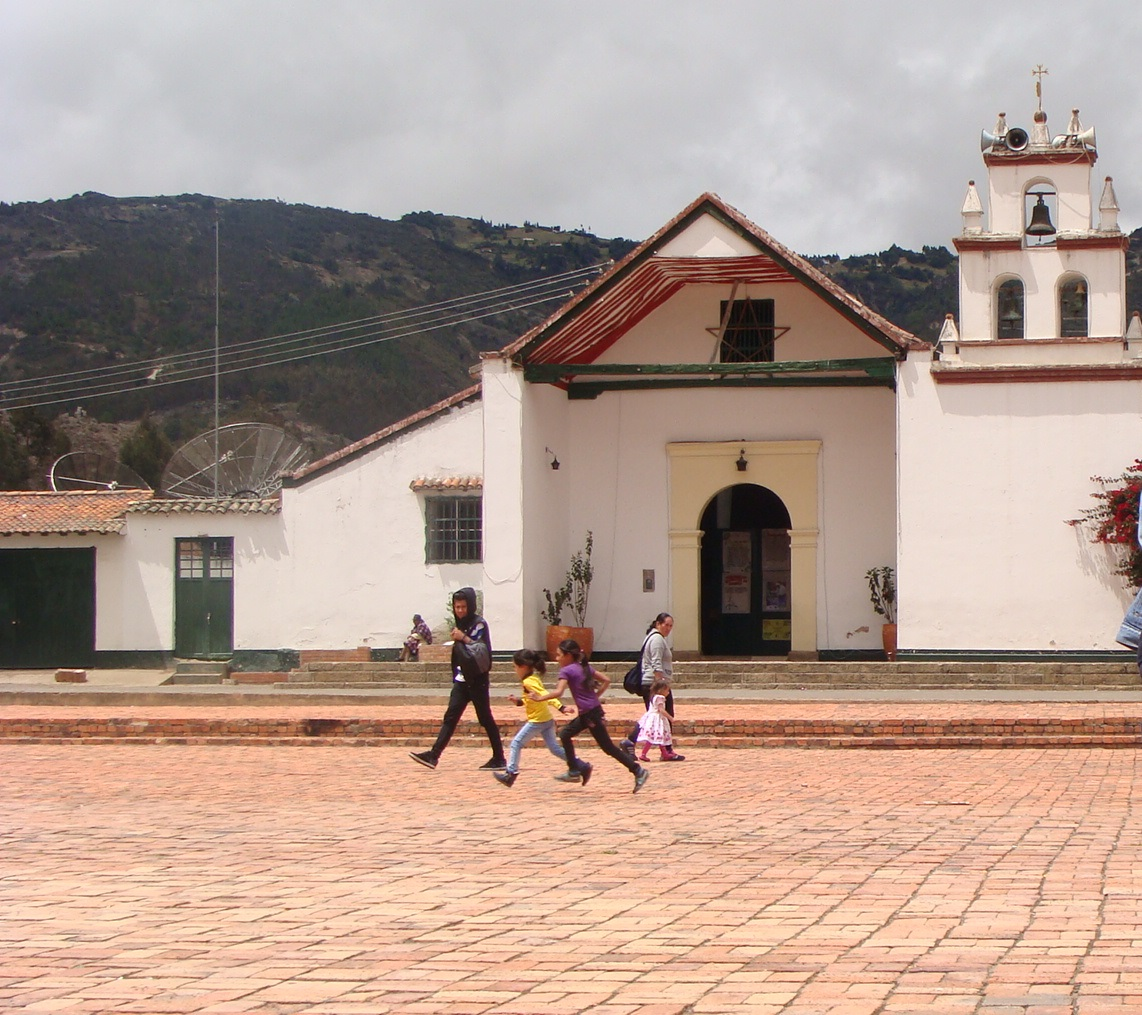
Church of Cucaita

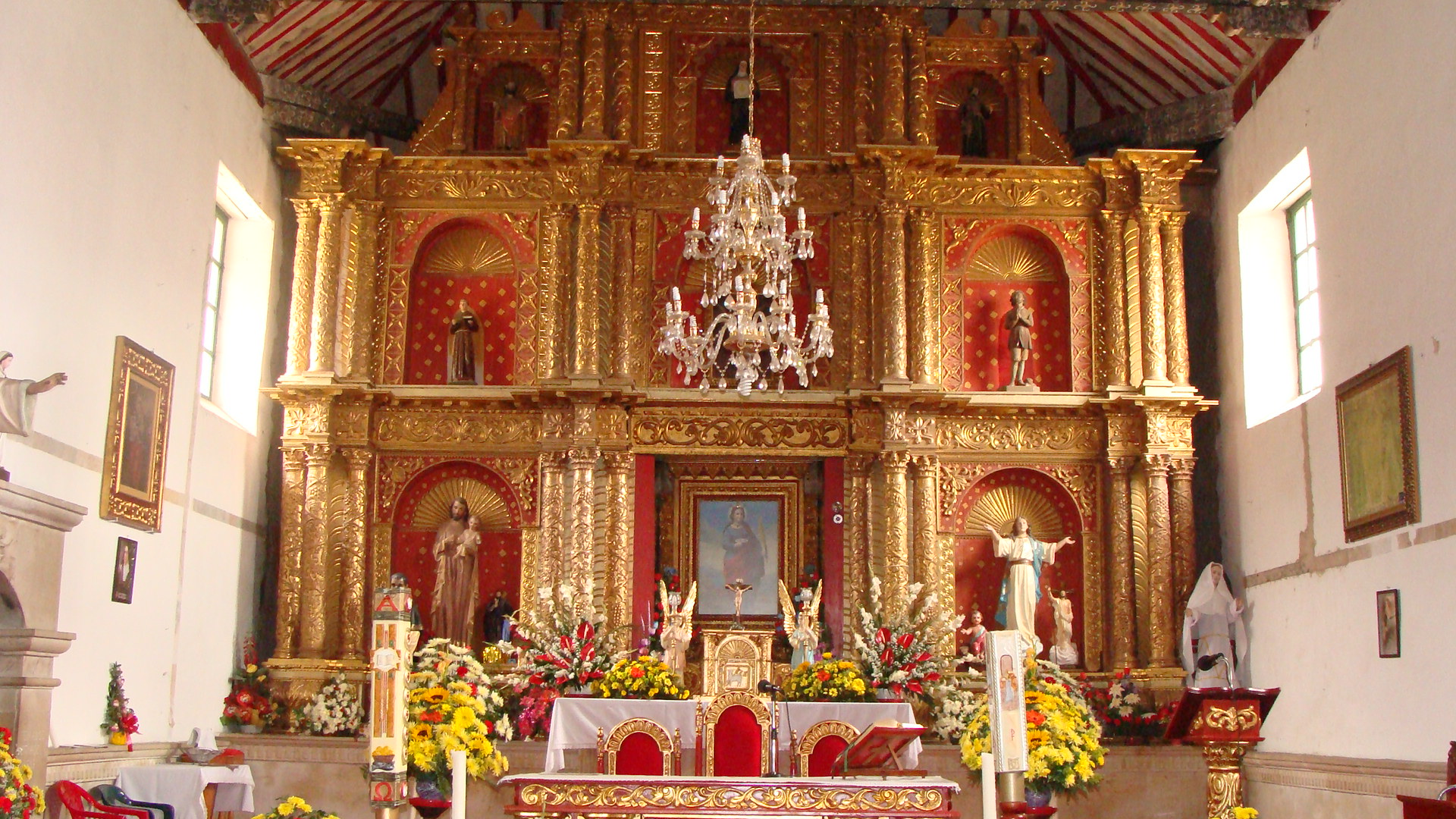
Church interior
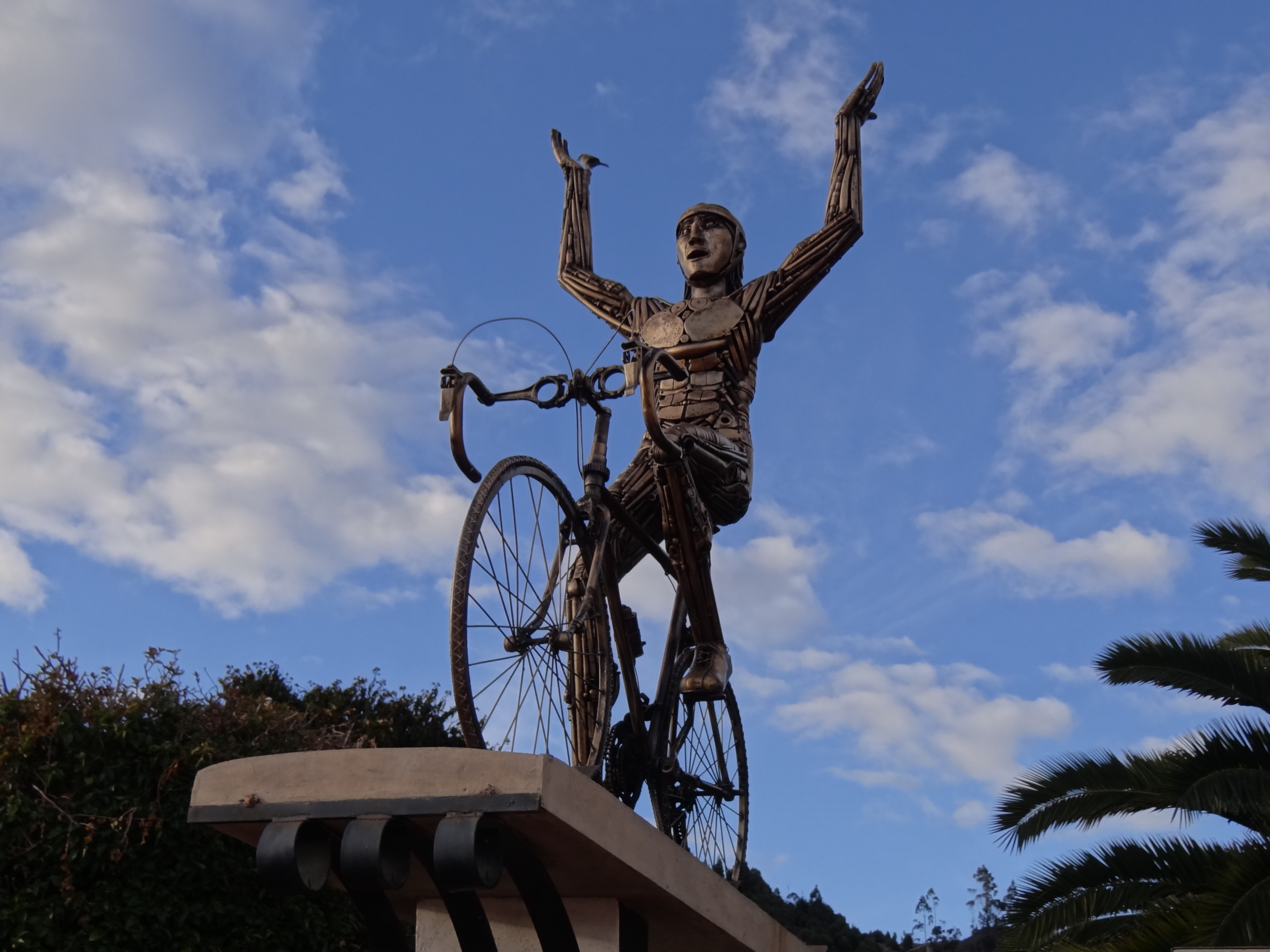
Monument to Rafael Antonio Niño

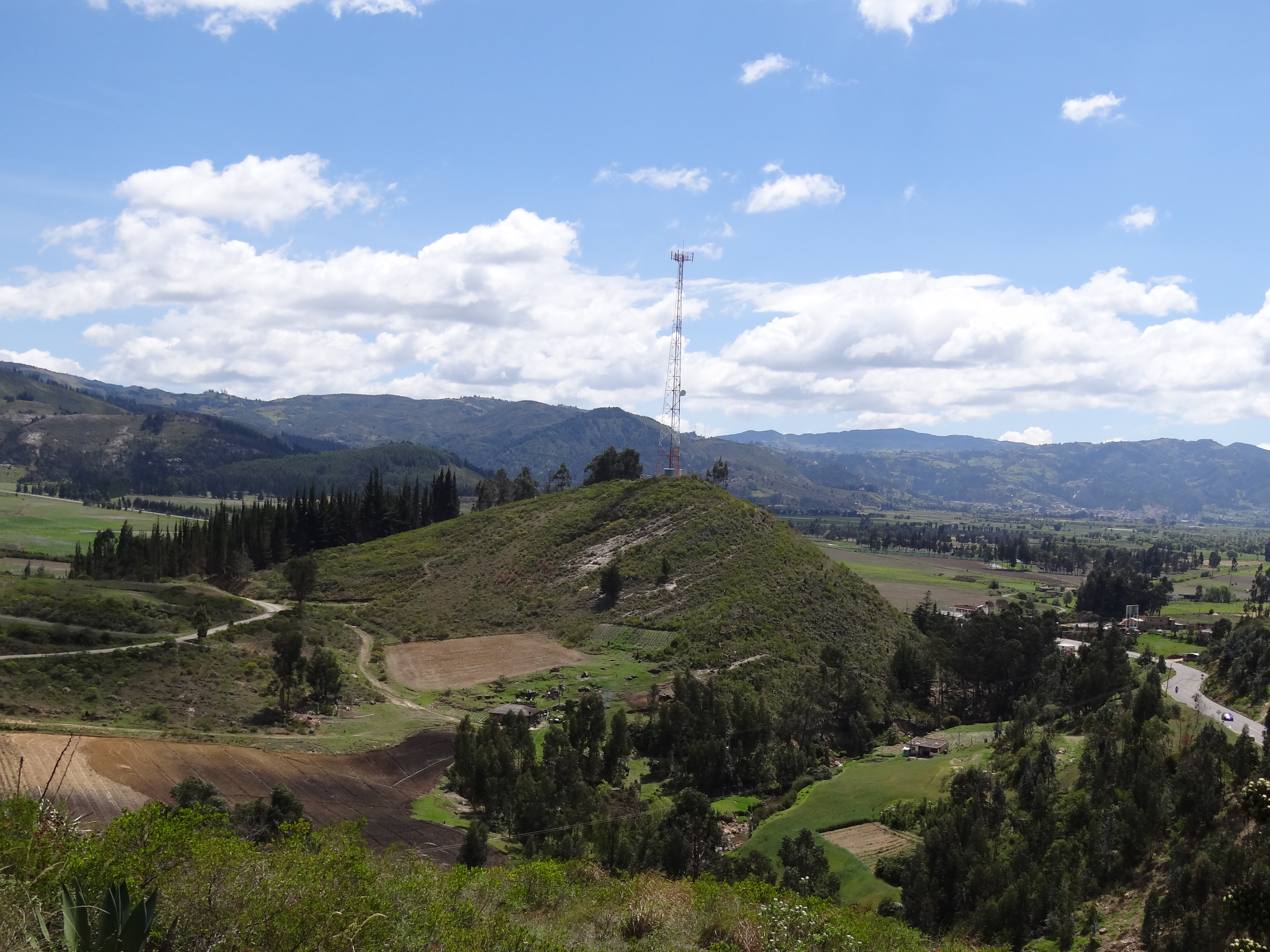
Rural Cucaita

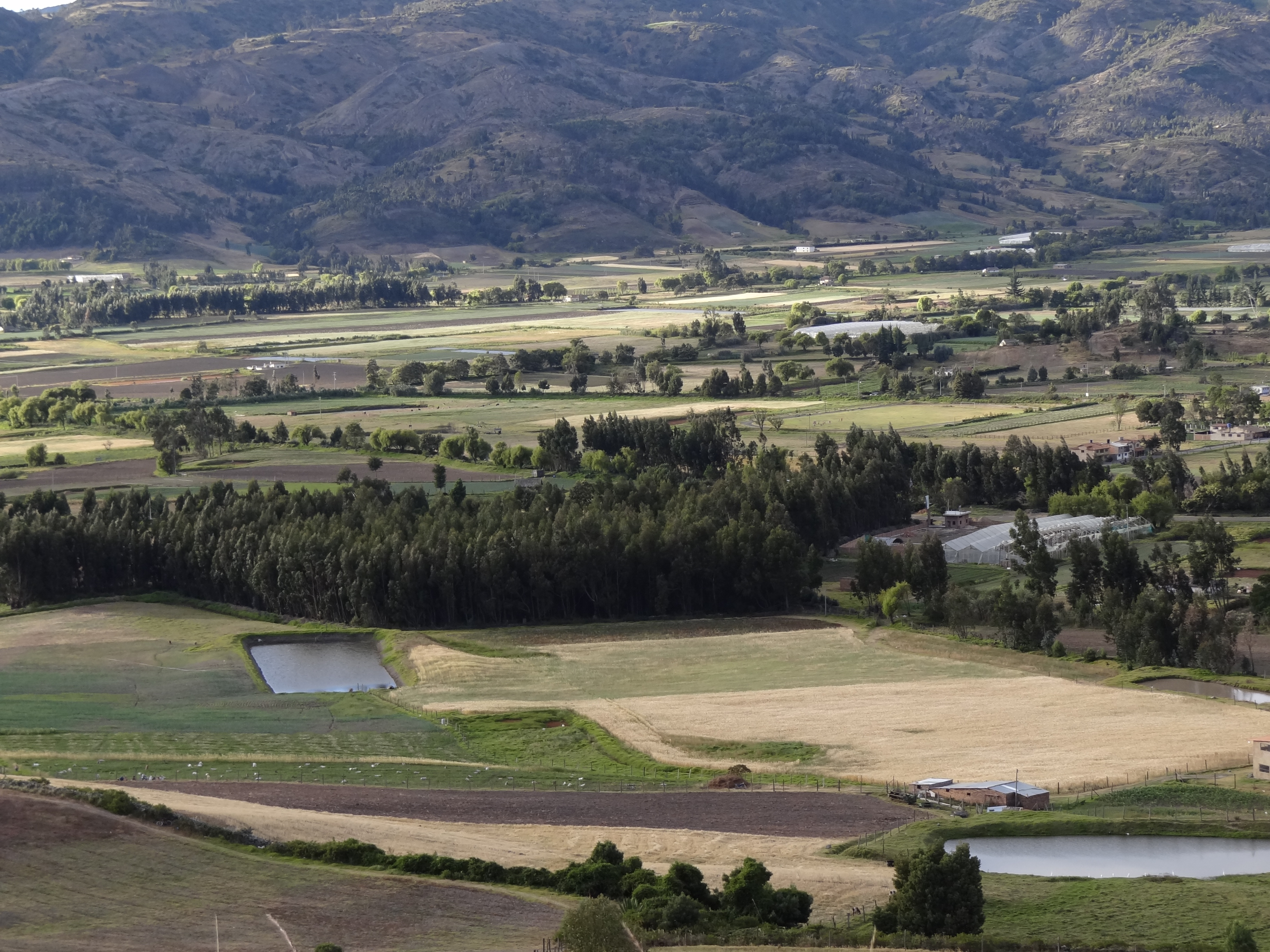
Farmfields
