= Rafael Montiel =

Colombian racing cyclist

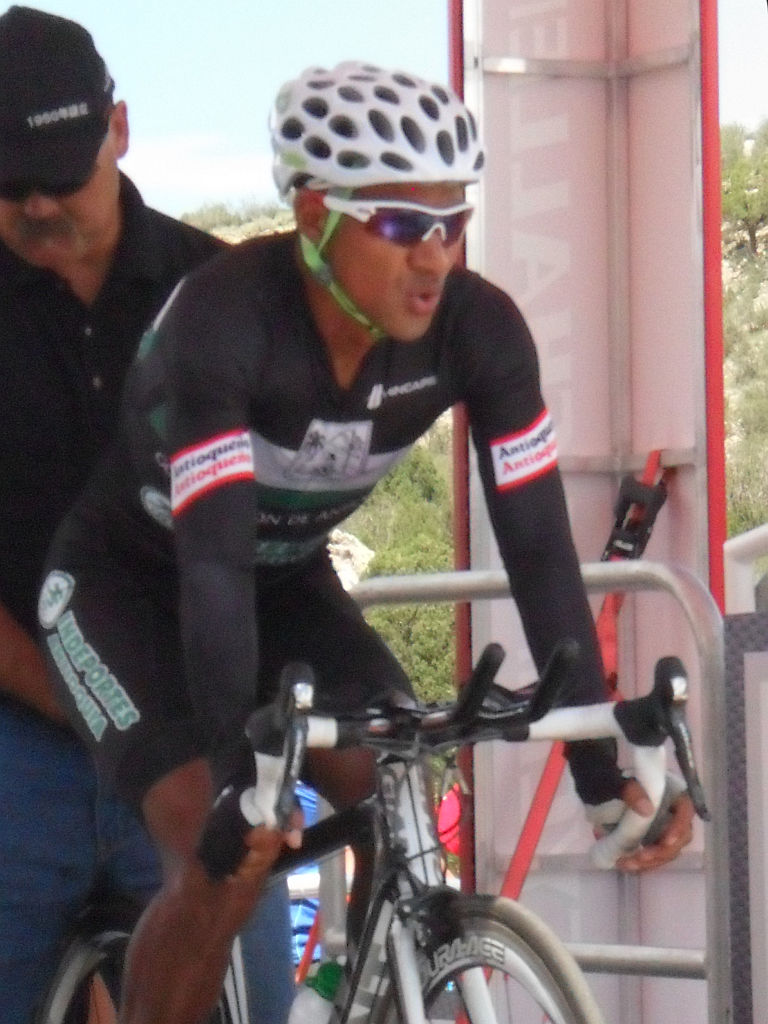
- Montiel at the 2011 USA Pro Cycling Challenge.

Personal information
- Full name: Rafael Anibal Montiel Cuéllar
- Born: 28 June 1981 (age 45) El Bagre, Colombia

Cycling career
- Sport: Cycling
- Discipline: Road
- Role: Rider
- Rider type: Climber

Amateur teams
- 2006–2007: Colombia es Pasión
- 2009: Néctar-Coldeportes-Cundinamarca
- 2009: Fedecarchi/Gobierno
- 2010: Indeportes Antioquia
- 2013: Aguardiente Antioqueño–Lotería de Medellín–IDEA
- 2016–2017: Aguardiente Antioqueño–Lotería de Medellín–Idea Indeportes Antioquia

Professional teams
- 2008: Colombia es Pasión–Coldeportes
- 2011–2012: Gobernación de Antioquia–Indeportes Antioquia
- 2015: Orgullo Antioqueño
- 2018–2019: Orgullo Paisa

Rafael Anibal Montiel Cuéllar (born 28 June 1981 in El Bagre) is a Colombian professional road cyclist, who last rode for UCI Continental team Orgullo Paisa. On 29 April 2015, Montiel won the opening stage of the Tour of the Gila, after catching the breakaway on the slopes of the last climb and soloing to the mountaintop finish.

== Major results ==
2006
9th Overall Clásico Ciclístico Banfoandes
2007
1st Stage 13 Vuelta a Colombia
2nd Overall Vuelta a Guatemala

1st Stage 5

3rd Overall Vuelta a Cundinamarca
10th Overall Vuelta a El Salvador

1st Stage 9

2008
1st Stage 6 Vuelta a Colombia
2009
2nd Overall Clásica de Soacha
2nd Overall Vuelta a Santander

1st Stage 2

3rd Overall Vuelta al Ecuador
2010
1st Stage 1 (TTT) Vuelta a Colombia
8th Overall Vuelta a Guatemala

1st Stage 4

2011
1st Stage 2a (TTT) Vuelta a Colombia
1st Mountains classification USA Pro Cycling Challenge
2013
1st Stage 5 Vuelta a Colombia
2014
8th Overall Vuelta a Guatemala
2015
1st Stage 1 Tour of the Gila

== See also ==
- List of doping cases in cycling
