= Rafael Antonio Niño =

Colombian cyclist (1949–2026)

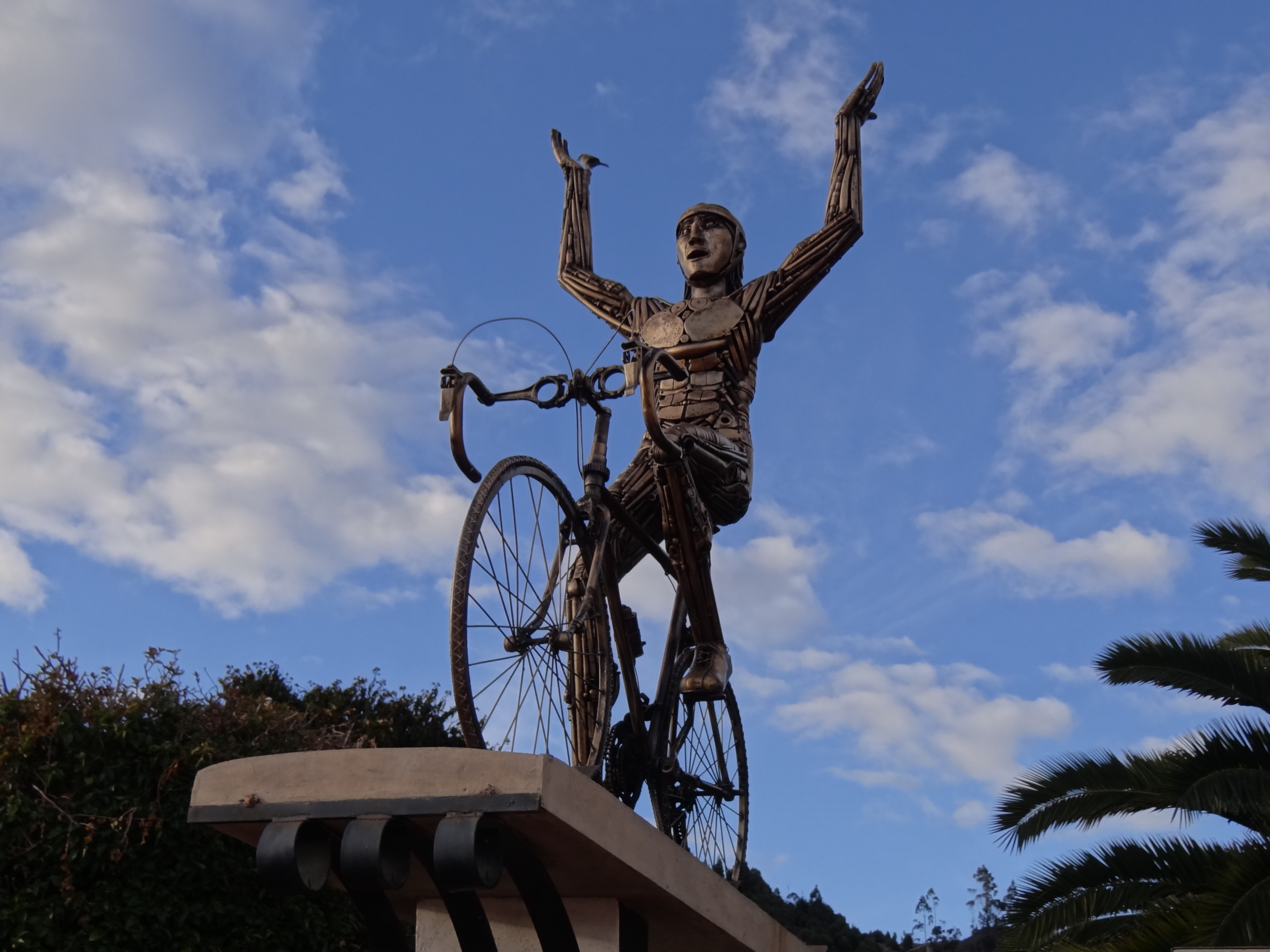
- Monument dedicated to Niño in his hometown of Cucaita, Colombia

Personal information
- Full name: Rafael Antonio Niño Munévar
- Nickname: El Niño de Cucaita
- Born: December 11, 1949 Cucaita, Colombia
- Died: July 9, 2026 (aged 76) Tunja, Colombia

Cycling career
- Sport: Cycling
- Discipline: Road
- Role: Rider
- Rider type: Climbing specialist

Amateur teams
- 1970: Junta administradora de deportes
- 1971: Singer
- 1972: Postobón
- 1973: Ferretería Reina Ltda
- 1975–1977: Banco Cafetero
- 1978: Benotto
- 1979: Lotería de Boyacá
- 1980: Droguería Yaneth
- 1981–1982: Lotería de Boyacá

Professional team
- 1974: Jollj Ceramica

Major wins
- Vuelta a Colombia (6 times); Clásico RCN (5 times)

Rafael Antonio Niño Munévar (December 11, 1949 – July 9, 2026) was a Colombian road racing cyclist. He won the Vuelta a Colombia in 1970. After that he became a professional cyclist from 1973 to 1974. He participated in the Giro d'Italia. After one year as a professional he returned to Colombia and set up the Banco Cafetero team of which he was the undisputed leader. With this strong team he dominated the Vuelta a Colombia and the Clásico RCN during the 1970s. He earned the nickname El Niño de Cucaita. He won a record six editions of the Vuelta a Colombia.

After he retired he became a technical director of the Colombia professional cycling team, Café de Colombia, that participated in the Tour de France winning several stages during the 1980s. Niño died on July 9, 2026, at the age of 76.

== Major results ==
1970
1st Overall Vuelta a Colombia
1971
1st Overall Clásico RCN
3rd Overall Vuelta a Colombia
1972
1st Stage 6 Vuelta a Colombia
2nd Overall Vuelta al Táchira

1st Sprints classification

3rd Overall Clásico RCN
1973
1st Overall Vuelta a Colombia

1st Stages 2 & 6

1975
1st Overall Vuelta a Colombia

1st Mountains classification
1st Stages 7, 10 & 12

1st Overall Clásico RCN

1st Points classification
1st Mountains classification
1st Combined classification
1st Stages 4 & 5

1976
1st Stages 3b & 4 Vuelta a Boyacá
1977
1st Overall Vuelta a Colombia

1st Points classification
1st Mountains classification
1st Combined classification
1st Stages 1, 7, 10 & 11

1st Overall Clásico RCN

1st Points classification

2nd Overall Vuelta a Cundinamarca

1st Points classification
1st Stages 1 & 6

1978
1st Overall Vuelta a Colombia

1st Stage 4

1st Overall Clásico RCN

1st Points classification
1st Mountains classification
1st Combined classification
1st Stages 3a & 5

1979
1st Overall Clásico RCN

1st Combined classification
1st Stage 4

4th Overall Vuelta a Colombia
1980
1st Overall Vuelta a Colombia

1st Stages 6 & 13

1981
1st Stage 11 Vuelta a Colombia
