= Jefferson Vargas =

Colombian cyclist

Personal information
- Full name: Jefferson Abacuc Vargas Pacheco
- Born: 6 November 1984 (age 41) Motavita, Boyacá, Colombia

Cycling career
- Sport: Cycling
- Current team: Retired
- Discipline: Road
- Role: Rider

Amateur teams
- 2010–2011: Redetrans–Supergiros
- 2012: Formesan–IDRD–Pinturas Bler
- 2013: Formesan–Bogota Humana
- 2014: Los Pijaos–Rodrigo Pacheco
- 2014: Blanco del Valle–Redetrans
- 2015: Gobernación de Boyacá
- 2015: Fundacion Jose Rujano
- 2016: Mundial de Tornillos–Pijaos Web
- 2016: Team Arroz Sonora–Dimonex
- 2017: Tolima es Pasión–Carnaval del Pollo
- 2018: Club Ciclo Valle

Professional team
- 2007–2009: Boyacá es Para Vivirla–Marche

Jefferson Abacuc Vargas Pacheco (born 6 November 1984) is a Colombian former professional road cyclist.

== Major results ==
2008
1st Stage 4 Vuelta a Colombia
2011
1st Stage 2 Vuelta al Valle del Cibao
2012
1st Stage 4 Vuelta al Tolima
