= Édgar Fonseca =

Colombian cyclist (born 1981)

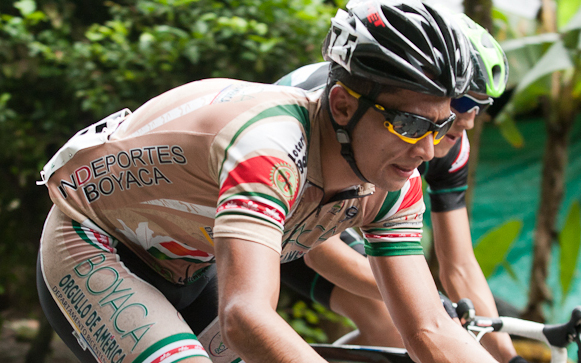
- Fonseca competing in the 2011 Vuelta a Antioquia

Personal information
- Born: March 6, 1981 (age 45) Duitama, Boyacá, Colombia

Cycling career
- Sport: Cycling
- Discipline: Road cycling
- Role: Rider

Carlos Édgar Fonseca (born March 6, 1981, in Duitama, Boyacá) is a male professional road cyclist from Colombia.

== Career ==
2005
1st in Stage 2 Clasica del Meta (COL)
2008
1st in Stage 5 Vuelta a Colombia, La Dorada (COL)
