= Wilson Cepeda =

Colombian racing cyclist

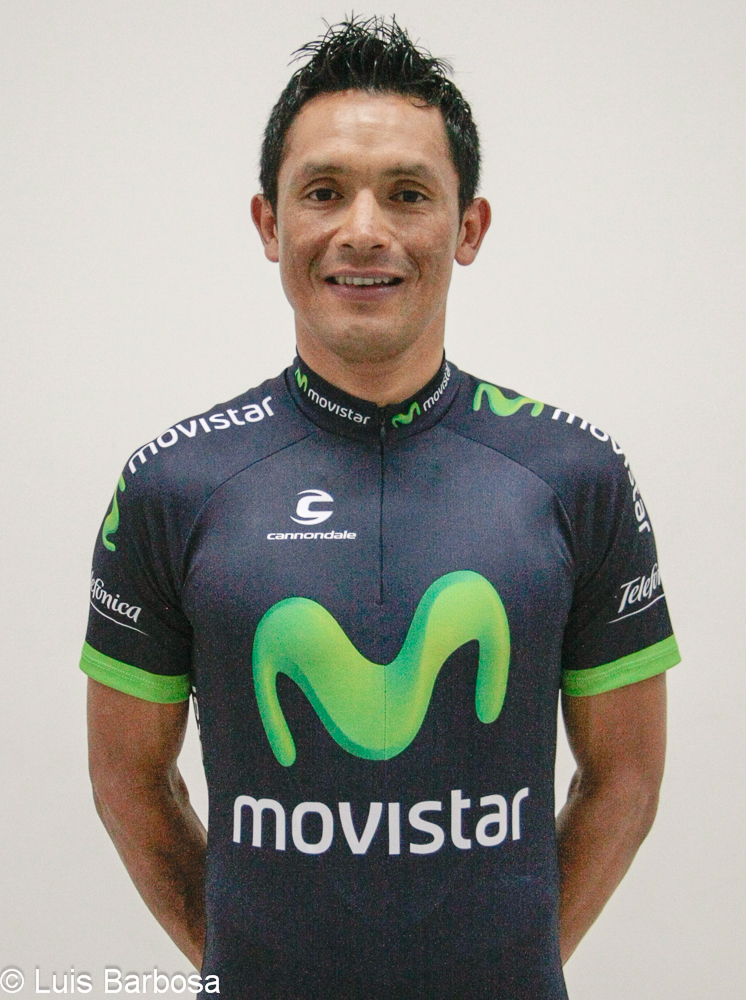
- Cepeda in 2013

Personal information
- Full name: Wilson Fernando Cepeda Cuervo
- Born: 2 September 1980 (age 46) Paipa, Boyacá, Colombia

Cycling career
- Sport: Cycling
- Current team: Retired
- Discipline: Road
- Role: Rider

Amateur teams
- 2007: Coordinadora EBSA
- 2008: UNE
- 2010: EBSA
- 2011: IDRD–Liga de Bogotá–Formesan
- 2012: Formesan–Bogotá Humana–Pinturas Bler
- 2013–2014: Movistar Team América

Professional teams
- 2005: Catalunya–Ángel Mir
- 2006: Massi
- 2009: Boyacá es Para Vivirla
- 2015–2017: Movistar Team América

Wilson Fernando Cepeda Cuervo (born September 2, 1980, in Paipa, Boyacá) is a Colombian former professional road racing cyclist.

== Major results ==
2002
1st Stage 5 Vuelta al Tolima
2003
1st Stage 3 Vuelta a Cundinamarca
2005
1st Stage 4 Vuelta a Ávila
2008
1st Overall Clasica Alcaldía de Pasca
2009
1st Stage 4 Vuelta a Colombia
