= La Tola =

Coordinates: 2°25′N 78°15′W

- Municipality and town
- Flag

- Location of the municipality and town of La Tola in the Nariño Department of Colombia.
- Country: Colombia
- Department: Nariño Department

Area
  - Total: 128 km^{2} (49 sq mi)

Population (Census 2018)
  - Total: 5,847
  - Density: 45.7/km^{2} (118/sq mi)
- Time zone: UTC-5 (Colombia Standard Time)

La Tola is a town and municipality in the Nariño Department, Colombia.

== Climate ==
La Tola has a tropical rainforest climate (Köppen Af) with heavy to very heavy rainfall year-round.

Climate data for La Tola
Month	Jan	Feb	Mar	Apr	May	Jun	Jul	Aug	Sep	Oct	Nov	Dec	Year
Mean daily maximum °C (°F)	28.9 (84.0)	29.9 (85.8)	30.3 (86.5)	30.0 (86.0)	29.9 (85.8)	29.9 (85.8)	29.7 (85.5)	29.5 (85.1)	29.2 (84.6)	28.6 (83.5)	28.7 (83.7)	29.1 (84.4)	29.5 (85.1)
Daily mean °C (°F)	25.6 (78.1)	26.1 (79.0)	26.4 (79.5)	26.3 (79.3)	26.4 (79.5)	26.1 (79.0)	26.0 (78.8)	25.9 (78.6)	25.8 (78.4)	25.7 (78.3)	25.7 (78.3)	25.7 (78.3)	26.0 (78.8)
Mean daily minimum °C (°F)	22.4 (72.3)	22.3 (72.1)	22.5 (72.5)	22.7 (72.9)	22.9 (73.2)	22.3 (72.1)	22.3 (72.1)	22.4 (72.3)	22.4 (72.3)	22.8 (73.0)	22.7 (72.9)	22.3 (72.1)	22.5 (72.5)
Average rainfall mm (inches)	331 (13.0)	300 (11.8)	263 (10.4)	349 (13.7)	521 (20.5)	492 (19.4)	335 (13.2)	295 (11.6)	375 (14.8)	361 (14.2)	280 (11.0)	254 (10.0)	4,156 (163.6)
Source: Climate-Data.org
