= Vuelta a Bolivia =

Race details
- Date: November
- Region: Bolivia
- English name: Tour of Bolivia
- Local name: Vuelta a Bolivia (in Spanish)
- Discipline: Road
- Competition: UCI America Tour
- Type: Stage race
- Web site: www.fidesciclismo.com/vuelta/iii/

History
- First edition: 2008
- Editions: 6 (as of 2013)
- Final edition: 2013
- First winner: Fernando Camargo (COL)
- Most wins: No repeat winners
- Final winner: Salvador Moreno (COL)

The Vuelta a Bolivia is the most important road bicycle race in the State of Bolivia. The first edition of the race, in 2008, replaced an historical Bolivian race, the "Doble Copacabana de Ciclismo". It is now organized as a 2.2 event on the UCI America Tour.

== Winners ==
Year	Country	Rider	Team
2008	Colombia	Fernando Camargo	Boyacá Colombia
2009	Colombia	Gregorio Ladino	Tecos de la Universidad Autónoma de Guadalajara
2010	Bolivia	Oscar Soliz	EBSA
2011	Bolivia	Juan Cotumba	Pio Rico
2012	Venezuela	Maky Roman	Prodem–Loteria del Táchira
2013	Colombia	Salvador Moreno	Colombia–Coldeportes
