= 1996 Tour de Langkawi =

Race details
- Dates: 29 February–10 March 1996
- Stages: 11
- Distance: 1,294.8 km (804.6 mi)
- Winning time: 34h 21' 22"

Results
Jersey awarded to the overall winner	Winner	Damian McDonald (AUS)	(Giant-AIS)
	Second	Chris Newton (GBR)	(Great Britain)
	Third	Brett Dennis (AUS)	(Giant-AIS)
Jersey awarded to the points classification winner	Points	Damian McDonald (AUS)	(Giant-AIS)
Jersey awarded to the mountains classification winner	Mountains	Chris Newton (GBR)	(Giant-AIS)
	Team	Giant-AIS	

The 1996 Tour de Langkawi was the first edition of the Tour de Langkawi, a cycling stage race that took place in Malaysia. It officially began on 29 February in Langkawi and ended on 10 March in Langkawi. The race was sanctioned by the Union Cycliste Internationale (UCI) as a 2.5 category race.

Australian rider, Damian McDonald emerged as the first winner of the race. Chris Newton of Great Britain was second and another Australian, Brett Dennis third. McDonald was also the first winner of points classification and mountains classification of the race. Giant-AIS won the team classification of the race.

== Stages ==
The race comprised 11 stages, covering 1,294.8 kilometres.

Stage	Date	Course	Distance	Stage winner
1	29 February	Langkawi Criterium	70.8 km (44.0 mi)	Jay Sweet (AUS)
2	1 March	Langkawi Team time trial	40 km (24.9 mi)	Great Britain: Matt Illingworth (GBR); John Tanner (GBR); Rob Hayles (GBR); Bryan Steel (GBR); Chris Newton (GBR)
3	2 March	Kangar to George Town	186 km (115.6 mi)	Glen Mitchell (NZL)
4	3 March	George Town to Ipoh	173 km (107.5 mi)	Josef Christen (SUI)
5	4 March	Tanjung Malim to Genting Highlands	63 km (39.1 mi)	Damian McDonald (AUS)
6	5 March	Kuala Lumpur to Malacca	167 km (103.8 mi)	Patrick Vetsch (SUI)
7	6 March	Muar to Johor Bahru	172 km (106.9 mi)	Rob Hayles (GBR)
8	7 March	Mersing to Kuantan	203 km (126.1 mi)	Patrick Vetsch (SUI)
9	8 March	Kuantan to Kuala Terengganu	113 km (70.2 mi)	Richie McCauley (IRL)
10	9 March	Kuala Terengganu to Kota Bharu	107 km (66.5 mi)	Jay Sweet (AUS)
11	10 March	Langkawi Criterium	67 km (41.6 mi)	Marc Jacobsen (DEN)

== Final standings ==
=== General classification ===
	Rider	Time
1	Damian McDonald (AUS)	34h 21' 22"
2	Chris Newton (GBR)	+ 09"
3	Brett Dennis (AUS)	+ 12"
4	Matthew White (AUS)	+ 53"
5	Douglas Ryder (RSA)	+ 01' 02"
6	Marcel Gono (AUS)	+ 01' 03"
7	Ján Valach (SVK)	+ 01' 11"
8	Brenden Hart (NZL)	+ 01' 16"
9	Kelvin Martin (AUS)	+ 01' 21"
10	Mark Rendell (NZL)	+ 01' 23"
11	Josef Christen (SUI)	n/a
12	David George (RSA)	n/a
13	Morten Sonne (DEN)	n/a
14	Ralf Grabsch (GER)	n/a
15	Alan Volhuter (RSA)	n/a
