= 2021 Team Qhubeka NextHash season =

Team Qhubeka NextHash
- 2021 season
- UCI code: TQA
- Status: UCI WorldTeam
- World Tour Rank: 20th
- Manager: Douglas Ryder (RSA)
- Main sponsor(s): Qhubeka; Assos (until 23 June); NextHash Group (since 24 June)
- Based: South Africa
- Bicycles: BMC
- Groupset: Shimano

Season victories
- One-day races: 2
- Stage race stages: 3
- Most wins: Giacomo Nizzolo (ITA) (3)
- Best ranked rider: Giacomo Nizzolo (ITA) (21st)

The 2021 season for Team Qhubeka NextHash was its sixth season as a UCI WorldTeam and its 15th overall. After last year's title sponsor, Japanese telecommunications company NTT, decided not to renew their contract with the team, South African bicycle charity organization Qhubeka, a former title sponsor, and Swiss clothing brand Assos stepped up to sponsor the team for two seasons. However, before the new sponsors were announced, the sponsorship crisis led to many riders seeking contracts with teams elsewhere, resulting in the departure of 19 of the 29 riders on the team last season.

Prior to the Tour de France, cryptocurrency investment company NextHash Group became the team's co-title sponsor as part of a five-year sponsorship deal, and the team rebranded as Team Qhubeka NextHash.

However, despite finding a sponsor mid-season again, the team faced financial problems. In December 2021, the UCI announced that the team would not receive a UCI WorldTour license for 2022. The team then announced they would continue at the UCI Continental level with the development team (Team Qhubeka) and hoped to return to the WorldTour in the future.

== Team roster ==
As of 5 September 2021.

Rider	Date of birth
Sander Armée (BEL)	10 December 1985 (aged 35)
Fabio Aru (Note: Aru retired on 5 September, following the conclusion of the Vuelta a España.) (ITA)	3 July 1990 (aged 30)
Carlos Barbero (ESP)	29 April 1991 (aged 29)
Sean Bennett (USA)	March 31, 1996 (aged 24)
Connor Brown (NZL)	6 August 1998 (aged 22)
Victor Campenaerts (BEL)	28 October 1991 (aged 29)
Dimitri Claeys (BEL)	18 June 1987 (aged 33)
Simon Clarke (AUS)	18 July 1986 (aged 34)
Nicholas Dlamini (RSA)	12 August 1995 (aged 25)
Kilian Frankiny (SUI)	26 January 1994 (aged 26)
Michael Gogl (AUT)	4 November 1993 (aged 27)
Lasse Norman Hansen (DEN)	11 February 1992 (aged 28)
Sergio Henao (COL)	10 December 1987 (aged 33)
Reinardt Janse van Rensburg (RSA)	3 February 1989 (aged 31)

Rider	Date of birth
Bert-Jan Lindeman (NED)	16 June 1989 (aged 31)
Giacomo Nizzolo (ITA)	30 January 1989 (aged 31)
Matteo Pelucchi (ITA)	21 January 1989 (aged 31)
Robert Power (AUS)	11 May 1995 (aged 25)
Domenico Pozzovivo (ITA)	30 November 1982 (aged 38)
Mauro Schmid (SUI)	4 December 1999 (aged 21)
Andreas Stokbro (DEN)	8 April 1997 (aged 23)
Dylan Sunderland (AUS)	26 February 1996 (aged 24)
Harry Tanfield (GBR)	17 November 1994 (aged 26)
Karel Vacek (CZE)	9 September 2000 (aged 20)
Emil Vinjebo (DEN)	24 March 1994 (aged 26)
Max Walscheid (GER)	13 June 1993 (aged 27)
Łukasz Wiśniowski (POL)	7 December 1991 (aged 29)

Riders who joined the team for the 2021 season

Rider	2020 team
Sander Armée	Lotto–Soudal
Fabio Aru	UAE Team Emirates
Sean Bennett	EF Pro Cycling
Connor Brown	neo-pro (NTT Continental Cycling Team)
Dimitri Claeys	Cofidis
Simon Clarke	EF Pro Cycling
Kilian Frankiny	Groupama–FDJ
Lasse Norman Hansen	Alpecin–Fenix
Sergio Henao	UAE Team Emirates
Bert-Jan Lindeman	Team Jumbo–Visma
Matteo Pelucchi	Bardiani–CSF–Faizanè
Robert Power	Team Sunweb
Mauro Schmid	neo-pro (Leopard Pro Cycling)
Harry Tanfield	AG2R La Mondiale
Karel Vacek	neo-pro (Team Colpack–Ballan)
Emil Vinjebo	Riwal Securitas
Łukasz Wiśniowski	CCC Team

Riders who left the team during or after the 2020 season

Rider	2021 team
Samuele Battistella	Astana–Premier Tech
Edvald Boasson Hagen	Total Direct Énergie
Michael Carbel	Retired
Stefan de Bod	Astana–Premier Tech
Benjamin Dyball	Team UKYO
Enrico Gasparotto	Retired
Amanuel Gebrezgabihier	Trek–Segafredo
Ryan Gibbons	UAE Team Emirates
Shotaro Iribe	Yowamushi Pedal Cycling
Ben King	Rally Cycling
Roman Kreuziger	Gazprom–RusVelo
Gino Mäder	Team Bahrain Victorious
Louis Meintjes	Intermarché–Wanty–Gobert Matériaux
Ben O'Connor	AG2R Citroën Team
Matteo Sobrero	Astana–Premier Tech
Jay Thomson	Retired
Rasmus Tiller	Uno-X Pro Cycling Team
Michael Valgren	EF Education–Nippo
Danilo Wyss	

== Season victories ==
Date	Race	Competition	Rider	Country	Location	Ref.
14 February	Clásica de Almería	UCI Europe Tour; UCI ProSeries	Giacomo Nizzolo (ITA)	Spain	Roquetas de Mar	
19 May	Giro d'Italia, Stage 11	UCI World Tour	Mauro Schmid (SUI)	Italy	Montalcino	
21 May	Giro d'Italia, Stage 13	UCI World Tour	Giacomo Nizzolo (ITA)	Italy	Verona	
23 May	Giro d'Italia, Stage 15	UCI World Tour	Victor Campenaerts (BEL)	Italy	Gorizia	
1 August	Circuito de Getxo	UCI Europe Tour	Giacomo Nizzolo (ITA)	Spain	Getxo	
