= 2001 Tour de Langkawi =

Race details
- Dates: 4–18 February 2001
- Stages: 12+Prologue
- Distance: 1,833.47 km (1,139.27 mi)
- Winning time: 42h 59' 23"

Results
Jersey awarded to the overall winner	Winner	Paolo Lanfranchi (ITA)	(Mapei–Quick-Step)
	Second	Paolo Bettini (ITA)	(Mapei–Quick-Step)
	Third	Chris Wherry (USA)	(Mercury Viatel)
Jersey awarded to the points classification winner	Points	Paolo Bettini (ITA)	(Mapei–Quick-Step)
Jersey awarded to the mountains classification winner	Mountains	Paolo Lanfranchi (ITA)	(Mapei–Quick-Step)
	Team	Mapei–Quick-Step	

The 2001 Tour de Langkawi was the 6th edition of the Tour de Langkawi, a cycling stage race that took place in Malaysia. It began with prologue on 4 February in Langkawi and ended on 18 February in Merdeka Square, Kuala Lumpur. In fact, this race was rated by the Union Cycliste Internationale (UCI) as a 2.3 category race.

Paolo Lanfranchi, Italian cyclist emerged as the winner of general classification and mountains classification of the race. Paolo Bettini became the winner of points classification and second-placed in general classification. Chris Wherry was third-placed in general classification. Mapei–Quick-Step became the winner of team classification.

== Stages ==
The cyclists competed in 12 stages, covering a distance of 1,833.47 kilometres. Prologue did not count towards the overall but many riders competed in the stage.

Stage	Date	Course	Distance	Stage result		
Stage	Date	Course	Distance	Winner	Second	Third
P	4 February	Langkawi Prologue	64.4 km (40.0 mi)	Paolo Lanfranchi (ITA)	Francesco Secchiari (ITA)	Dario Cioni (ITA)
1	6 February	Alor Setar to Sungai Petani	182 km (113.1 mi)	Gordon Fraser (CAN)	Jans Koerts (NED)	Enrico Degano (ITA)
2	7 February	Gerik to Kota Bharu	226.3 km (140.6 mi)	Enrico Degano (ITA)	Jans Koerts (NED)	Massimo Strazzer (ITA)
3	8 February	Kota Bharu to Kuala Terengganu	177.3 km (110.2 mi)	Paolo Bettini (ITA)	Alexandre Usov (BLR)	Ivan Quaranta (ITA)
4	9 February	Dungun to Kuantan	135.5 km (84.2 mi)	Jans Koerts (NED)	Ivan Quaranta (ITA)	Andris Naudužs (LAT)
5	10 February	Pekan to Kota Tinggi	241.1 km (149.8 mi)	Enrico Degano (ITA)	Henk Vogels (AUS)	Paolo Bettini (ITA)
6	11 February	Kluang to Malacca	150.4 km (93.5 mi)	Jans Koerts (NED)	Massimiliano Mori (ITA)	Saulius Ruskys (LTU)
	12 February	Rest day				
7	13 February	Malacca to Klang	172.1 km (106.9 mi)	Ivan Quaranta (ITA)	Jans Koerts (NED)	Enrico Degano (ITA)
8	14 February	Kuala Kubu Bharu to Tanah Rata	154.4 km (95.9 mi)	Paolo Lanfranchi (ITA)	Pascal Hervé (FRA)	Paolo Bettini (ITA)
9	15 February	Tapah to Genting Highlands	132 km (82.0 mi)	Paolo Lanfranchi (ITA)	Paolo Bertoglio (ITA)	Paolo Bettini (ITA)
10	16 February	Shah Alam Individual time trial	24.17 km (15.0 mi)	Nathan O'Neill (AUS)	Michael Rich (GER)	Chris Wherry (USA)
11	17 February	KL Tower to Shah Alam	162.9 km (101.2 mi)	Paolo Bettini (ITA)	Andris Naudužs (LAT)	Graeme Miller (NZL)
12	18 February	Merdeka Square, Kuala Lumpur Criterium	75.3 km (46.8 mi)	Federico Colonna (ITA)	Andris Naudužs (LAT)	Graeme Miller (NZL)

== Classification leadership ==
Stage	Stage winner	General classification	Points classification	Mountains classification	Asian rider classification	Team classification	Asian team classification
1	Gordon Fraser	Jans Koerts	Jans Koerts	not available	Makoto Iijima	Mercury Viatel	= Japan = Telekom Malaysia
2	Enrico Degano	Jans Koerts	Jans Koerts	not available	Tsen Seong Hoong	Mercury Viatel	= Japan = Telekom Malaysia
3	Paolo Bettini	Jans Koerts	Jans Koerts	Paolo Lanfranchi	Makoto Iijima	Mercury Viatel	= Japan = Telekom Malaysia
4	Jans Koerts	Jans Koerts	Jans Koerts	Paolo Lanfranchi	Makoto Iijima	Mercury Viatel	= Japan = Telekom Malaysia
5	Enrico Degano	Jans Koerts	Jans Koerts	Paolo Lanfranchi	Makoto Iijima	Mercury Viatel	= Japan = Telekom Malaysia
6	Jans Koerts	Jans Koerts	Jans Koerts	Paolo Lanfranchi	Makoto Iijima	Mercury Viatel	Telekom Malaysia
7	Ivan Quaranta	Jans Koerts	Jans Koerts	Paolo Lanfranchi	Makoto Iijima	Mercury Viatel	Telekom Malaysia
8	Paolo Lanfranchi	Paolo Bettini	Jans Koerts	Paolo Lanfranchi	Wong Kam-po	Mapei–Quick-Step	Telekom Malaysia
9	Paolo Lanfranchi	Paolo Lanfranchi	Paolo Bettini	Paolo Lanfranchi	Wong Kam-po	Mapei–Quick-Step	Telekom Malaysia
10	Nathan O'Neill	Paolo Lanfranchi	Paolo Bettini	Paolo Lanfranchi	Wong Kam-po	Mapei–Quick-Step	Telekom Malaysia
11	Paolo Bettini	Paolo Lanfranchi	Paolo Bettini	Paolo Lanfranchi	Wong Kam-po	Mapei–Quick-Step	Telekom Malaysia
12	Federico Colonna	Paolo Lanfranchi	Paolo Bettini	Paolo Lanfranchi	Wong Kam-po	Mapei–Quick-Step	Telekom Malaysia
Final		Paolo Lanfranchi	Paolo Bettini	Paolo Lanfranchi	Wong Kam-po	Mapei–Quick-Step	Telekom Malaysia

== Final standings ==
=== General classification ===
	Rider	Team	Time
1	Paolo Lanfranchi (ITA)	Mapei–Quick-Step	42h 59' 23"
2	Paolo Bettini (ITA)	Mapei–Quick-Step	+ 44"
3	Chris Wherry (USA)	Mercury Viatel	+ 01' 57"
4	Paolo Bertoglio (ITA)	Ceramiche Panaria–Fiordo	+ 02' 43"
5	Christopher Jenner (FRA)	Crédit Agricole	+ 03' 59"
6	Pascal Hervé (FRA)	Alexia Alluminio	+ 04' 21"
7	Jörg Ludewig (GER)	Saeco	+ 04' 29"
8	Niklas Axelsson (SWE)	Mercury Viatel	+ 04' 32"
9	Gianluca Tonetti (ITA)	Selle Italia–Pacific	+ 04' 58"
10	René Jørgensen (DEN)	CSC World Online	+ 05' 05"

=== Points classification ===
	Rider	Team	Points
1	Paolo Bettini (ITA)	Mapei–Quick-Step	129
2	Andris Naudužs (LAT)	Selle Italia–Pacific	82
3	Alexandre Usov (BLR)	Phonak	57
4	Sébastien Hinault (FRA)	Crédit Agricole	57
5	Peter Wrolich (AUT)	Gerolsteiner	46
6	Paolo Lanfranchi (ITA)	Mapei–Quick-Step	43
7	Massimiliano Mori (ITA)	Saeco	41
8	Graeme Miller (NZL)	Phonak	37
8	Chris Wherry (USA)	Mercury Viatel	37
8	Hans De Meester (BEL)	Collstrop–Palmans	37

=== Mountains classification ===
	Rider	Team	Points
1	Paolo Lanfranchi (ITA)	Mapei–Quick-Step	66
2	Pascal Hervé (FRA)	Alexia Alluminio	40
3	Paolo Bettini (ITA)	Mapei–Quick-Step	29
4	Paolo Bertoglio (ITA)	Ceramiche Panaria–Fiordo	20
5	Chris Wherry (USA)	Mercury Viatel	20
6	Walter Bénéteau (FRA)	Bonjour	18
7	Davide Bramati (ITA)	Mapei–Quick-Step	15
8	Gianluca Tonetti (ITA)	Selle Italia–Pacific	11
9	Amir Zargari (IRI)	Telekom Malaysia	10
9	Christopher Jenner (FRA)	Crédit Agricole	10

=== Asian rider classification ===
	Rider	Team	Time
1	Wong Kam-po (HKG)	Telekom Malaysia	43h 12' 02"
2	Ghader Mizbani (IRI)	Telekom Malaysia	+ 28"
3	Makoto Iijima (JPN)	Japan	+ 01' 23"
4	Tonton Susanto (INA)	Indonesia	+ 01' 44"
5	Victor Espiritu (PHI)	Telekom Malaysia	+ 05' 51"
6	Li Fuyu (CHN)	China	+ 06' 47"
7	Tsen Seong Hoong (MAS)	Malaysia	+ 15' 36"
8	Satoshi Hirose (JPN)	Japan	+ 16' 01"
9	Tang Xuezhong (CHN)	China	+ 17' 18"
10	Mitsuteru Tanaka (JPN)	Japan	+ 19' 00"

=== Team classification ===
	Team	Time
1	Mapei–Quick-Step	129h 05' 05"
2	Phonak	+ 16' 01"
3	Mercury Viatel	+ 16' 35"
4	Selle Italia–Pacific	+ 19' 44"
5	CSC World Online	+ 24' 19"
6	South Africa	+ 29' 13"
7	Telekom Malaysia	+ 29' 15"
8	Saturn	+ 35' 07"
9	Colchon Relax–Fuenlabrada	+ 38' 18"
10	Mobilvetta Rossin	+ 40' 37"

=== Asian team classification ===
	Team	Time
1	Telekom Malaysia	129h 40' 49"
2	Japan	+ 29' 43"
3	China	+ 37' 22"
4	Malaysia	+ 44' 04"

== List of teams and riders ==
A total of 25 teams were invited to participate in the 2001 Tour de Langkawi. Out of the 173 riders, a total of 108 riders made it to the finish in Kuala Lumpur.

Mercury Viatel

- (United States) Chris Horner
- (Sweden) Niklas Axelsson
- (United States) Scott Moninger
- (United States) Chris Wherry
- (Canada) Gordon Fraser
- (Netherlands) Jans Koerts
- (Australia) Henk Vogels

Mapei–Quick-Step

- (Italy) Paolo Lanfranchi
- (Italy) Dario Cioni
- (Italy) Paolo Bettini
- (Italy) Elio Aggiano
- (Spain) Pedro Horrillo
- (Italy) Davide Bramati
- (Italy) Rinaldo Nocentini

CSC World Online

- (Denmark) Michael Sandstød
- (Sweden) Martin Rittsel
- (Denmark) Nicki Sørensen
- (Denmark) Danny Jonasson
- (Denmark) René Jørgensen
- (Denmark) Jacob Moe Rasmussen
- (Denmark) Bjarke Nielsen

Ceramiche Panaria–Fiordo

- (Mexico) Julio Alberto Pérez
- (Italy) Enrico Degano
- (Italy) Antonio Varriale
- (Italy) Stefano Guerrini
- (Italy) Paolo Bertoglio
- (Australia) Tom Leaper
- (Australia) Nathan O'Neill

Crédit Agricole

- (Sweden) Magnus Bäckstedt
- (Germany) Jens Voigt
- (France) Anthony Langella
- (France) Ludovic Martin
- (France) Pierrick Fédrigo
- (France) Sébastien Hinault
- (France) Christopher Jenner

Saeco

- (Australia) Brad Davidson
- (Italy) Oscar Cavagnis
- (Italy) Alessio Galletti
- (Germany) Jörg Ludewig
- (Italy) Massimiliano Mori
- (Italy) Francesco Secchiari
- (Germany) Christian Wegmann

AG2R Prévoyance

- (Lithuania) Linas Balčiūnas
- (France) Stéphane Berges
- (France) Philippe Bordenave
- (France) Laurent Estadieu
- (France) Alexandre Grux
- (France) Thierry Loder
- (Estonia) Innar Mändoja

Telekom Malaysia

- (New Zealand) Graeme Miller
- (Philippines) Victor Espiritu
- (Iran) Ghader Mizbani
- (Iran) Amir Zargari
- (Norway) Björnar Vestöl
- (Malaysia) Mohamad Fauzi Shafihi
- (Hong Kong) Wong Kam-po

Team Fakta

- (Australia) Scott Sunderland
- (Denmark) Lennie Kristensen
- (Denmark) Allan Johansen
- (Norway) Kurt Asle Arvesen
- (Belgium) Manu L'hoir
- (Germany) Roberto Lochowski
- (Denmark) Morten Sonne

Cantina Tollo–Acqua & Sapone

- (Italy) Claudio Astolfi
- (Italy) Federico Colonna
- (Italy) Cesare Di Cintio
- (Italy) Federico Giabbecucci
- (Italy) Emanuele Negrini
- (Ukraine) Kyrylo Pospyeyev
- (Italy) Cristian Gasperoni

Mobilvetta Rossin

- (Italy) Massimo Strazzer
- (Czech Republic) Milan Kadlec
- (Italy) Daniele Castellan
- (Italy) Domenico Gualdi
- (Italy) Daniele Gadenz
- (Slovenia) Uroš Murn
- (Zimbabwe) Timothy Jones

Bonjour

- (France) Jean-Cyril Robin
- (France) Walter Bénéteau
- (France) Charles Guilbert
- (France) Olivier Perraudeau
- (France) Mickaël Pichon
- (France) Frédéric Gabriel
- (France) Thomas Voeckler

Malaysia

- (Malaysia) Sharulneeza Razali
- (Malaysia) Tsen Seong Hoong
- (Malaysia) Mohd Mahazir Hamad
- (Malaysia) Robert Lee
- (Malaysia) Wong Ah Thiam
- (Malaysia) Mohd Hardi Razali
- (Malaysia) Azlan Jamaludin

Canada

- (Canada) Mark Walters
- (Canada) Andrew Randell
- (Canada) Jacob Erker
- (Canada) Min Van Velzen
- (Canada) Svein Tuft
- (Canada) Cory Lange
- (Canada) Gregory Sienewicz

South Africa

- (South Africa) Douglas Ryder
- (South Africa) Kosie Loubser
- (South Africa) Simon Kessler
- (South Africa) Daniel Spence
- (South Africa) Neil McDonald
- (South Africa) James Lewis Perry
- (South Africa) Ian McLeod

Selle Italia–Pacific

- (Italy) Fortunato Baliani
- (Italy) Gianluca Tonetti
- (Italy) Leonardo Scarselli
- (Latvia) Andris Naudužs
- (Hungary) Csaba Szekeres
- (Australia) Russel Van Hout

Colchon Relax–Fuenlabrada

- (Spain) Nácor Burgos
- (Spain) Andres Bermejo Siller
- (Spain) Juan Antonio Flecha
- (Spain) David Fernandez Domingo
- (Spain) Eduardo Hernandez Bailo
- (Spain) German Nieto Fernandez
- (Spain) José Manuel Vázquez Palomo

Phonak

- (Germany) Bert Grabsch
- (Austria) Matthias Buxhofer
- (Switzerland) Lukas Zumsteg
- (Switzerland) Stéphane Richner
- (Switzerland) René Stadelmann
- (Switzerland) Uwe Straumann
- (Belarus) Alexandre Usov

Gerolsteiner

- (Austria) René Haselbacher
- (Germany) Michael Rich
- (Germany) Volker Ordowski
- (Lithuania) Saulius Ruskys
- (Germany) Andreas Sauerborn
- (Germany) Steffen Weigold
- (Austria) Peter Wrolich

Indonesia

- (Indonesia) Tonton Susanto
- (Indonesia) Wawan Setyobudi
- (Indonesia) Sulistiyono Sulistiyono
- (Indonesia) Matnur Matnur
- (Indonesia) Suyitno Suyitno
- (Indonesia) Heru Febianto
- (Indonesia) Amin Suryana

China

- (China) Tang Xuezhong
- (China) Li Fuyu
- (China) Zhu Yongbiao
- (China) Ma Yajun
- (China) Li Zhengjiang
- (China) Xiao Yechen
- (China) Zheng Xiaohai

Japan

- (Japan) Ken Hashikawa
- (Japan) Kazuya Okazaki
- (Japan) Junichi Shibuya
- (Japan) Makoto Iijima
- (Japan) Satoshi Hirose
- (Japan) Yoshimasa Hiroshi
- (Japan) Mitsuteru Tanaka

Alexia Alluminio

- (Italy) Ivan Quaranta
- (France) Pascal Hervé
- (Ukraine) Serguei Outschakov
- (Italy) Mario Manzoni
- (Italy) Corrado Serina
- (Italy) Christian Auriemma
- (Italy) Andrea Brognara

Collstrop–Palmans

- (Belgium) Tony Bracke
- (Belgium) Danny Baeyens
- (Belgium) Eric De Clercq
- (Belgium) Hans De Meester
- (Ukraine) Oleg Pankov
- (Belgium) Karel Pauwels
- (Lithuania) Donatas Virbickas

Saturn

- (United States) Frank McCormack
- (United States) Matt DeCanio
- (United States) Chris Fisher
- (United States) Trent Klesna
- (Netherlands) Harm Jansen
- (Canada) Michael Barry
- (Denmark) Soren Petersen
