= 2001 Tour Down Under =

3rd edition of the Tour Down Under stage race

Race details
- Dates: 16–21 January 2001
- Stages: 6
- Winning time: 18h 34' 20"

Results
Jersey awarded to the overall winner	Winner	Stuart O'Grady (AUS)	(Crédit Agricole)
	Second	Kai Hundertmarck (GER)	(Team Telekom)
	Third	Fabio Sacchi (ITA)	(Saeco)
Jersey awarded to the points classification winner	Points	Graeme Brown (AUS)	(United Water)
Jersey awarded to the mountains classification winner	Mountains	Robert Tighello (AUS)	(Sun-Smart–Mitsubishi)
Jersey awarded to the young rider classification winner	Young rider	Gene Bates (AUS)	(UniSA–Australia)
	Team	Mapei–Quick-Step	

The 2001 Tour Down Under was the third edition of the Tour Down Under stage race. It took place from 16 to 21 January in and around Adelaide, South Australia. This edition was won for the second time by Australian rider Stuart O'Grady, who rode for Crédit Agricole.

== Teams ==
- Jacob's Creek–Linda McCartney Racing
- UniSA–Australia
- Team Telekom
- Crédit Agricole
- United Water
- Lotto–Adecco
- AG2R Prévoyance
- Mapei–Quick-Step
- Sun-Smart–Mitsubishi
- CSC–Tiscali
- BigMat–Auber 93
- Saeco

== Route ==
Stage	Date	Route	Distance	Winner	Nation	Team
1	16 January	Glenelg	47.0 km	Graeme Brown	Australia	United Water
2	17 January	Norwood – Murray Bridge	142.0 km	Fabio Sacchi	Italy	Saeco
3	18 January	McLaren Vale – Victor Harbor	165.5 km	Alessio Galletti	Italy	Saeco
4	19 January	Unley – Strathalbyn	157.0 km	Luke Roberts	Australia	UniSA–Australia
5	20 January	Gawler – Tanunda	156.0 km	Kai Hundertmarck	Germany	Team Telekom
6	21 January	Adelaide	90.0 km	David McKenzie	Australia	Jacob's Creek–Linda McCartney Racing Team

== Stage results ==
=== Stage 1 ===
Rank	Rider	Nation	Time
1	Graeme Brown	Australia	1h 00' 02"
2	Stuart O'Grady	Australia	s.t.
3	Fabio Sacchi	Italy	s.t.
4	Ciaran Power	Ireland	s.t.
5	Fabien De Waele	Belgium	s.t.

=== Stage 2 ===
Rank	Rider	Nation	Time
1	Fabio Sacchi	Italy	3h 26' 24"
2	Stuart O'Grady	Australia	s.t.
3	Kai Hundertmarck	Germany	s.t.
4	Nick Gates	Australia	s.t.
5	Glenn D'Hollander	Belgium	s.t.

=== Stage 3 ===
Rank	Rider	Nation	Time
1	Alessio Galletti	Italy	4h 18' 12"
2	Graeme Brown	Australia	+ 3' 18"
3	Stuart O'Grady	Australia	+ 3' 18"
4	Hendrik Van Dyck	Belgium	+ 3' 18"
5	David McKenzie	Australia	+ 3' 18"

=== Stage 4 ===
Rank	Rider	Nation	Time
1	Luke Roberts	Australia	3h 44' 07"
2	Marcel Gono	Australia	s.t.
3	Nicolaj Bo Larsen	Denmark	s.t.
4	Trent Wilson	Australia	+ 4"
5	Nicolas Jalabert	France	+ 8"

=== Stage 5 ===
Rank	Rider	Nation	Time
1	Kai Hundertmarck	Germany	4h 00' 28"
2	Peter Rogers	Australia	s.t.
3	Allan Davis	Australia	s.t.
4	Fabio Sacchi	Italy	s.t.
5	Glenn D'Hollander	Belgium	s.t.

=== Stage 6 ===
Rank	Rider	Nation	Time
1	David McKenzie	Australia	1h 58' 48"
2	Ben Day	Australia	+ 17"
3	Luca Paolini	Italy	+ 20"
4	Torsten Nitsche	Germany	+ 32"
5	Kurt Van Lancker	Belgium	+ 32"

== Final classification ==
Rank	Rider	Nation	Time
1	Stuart O'Grady	Australia	18h 34' 20"
2	Kai Hundertmarck	Germany	+ 2"
3	Fabio Sacchi	Italy	+ 3"
4	Daniele Nardello	Italy	+ 8"
5	Christopher Jenner	Australia	+ 8"
6	Alexandre Botcharov	Russia	+ 10"
7	Patrick Jonker	Australia	+ 10"
8	Benoit Poilvet	France	+ 10"
9	Glenn D'Hollander	Belgium	+ 21"
10	Cadel Evans	Australia	+ 24"
