= 2014 MTN–Qhubeka season =

MTN–Qhubeka
- 2014 season
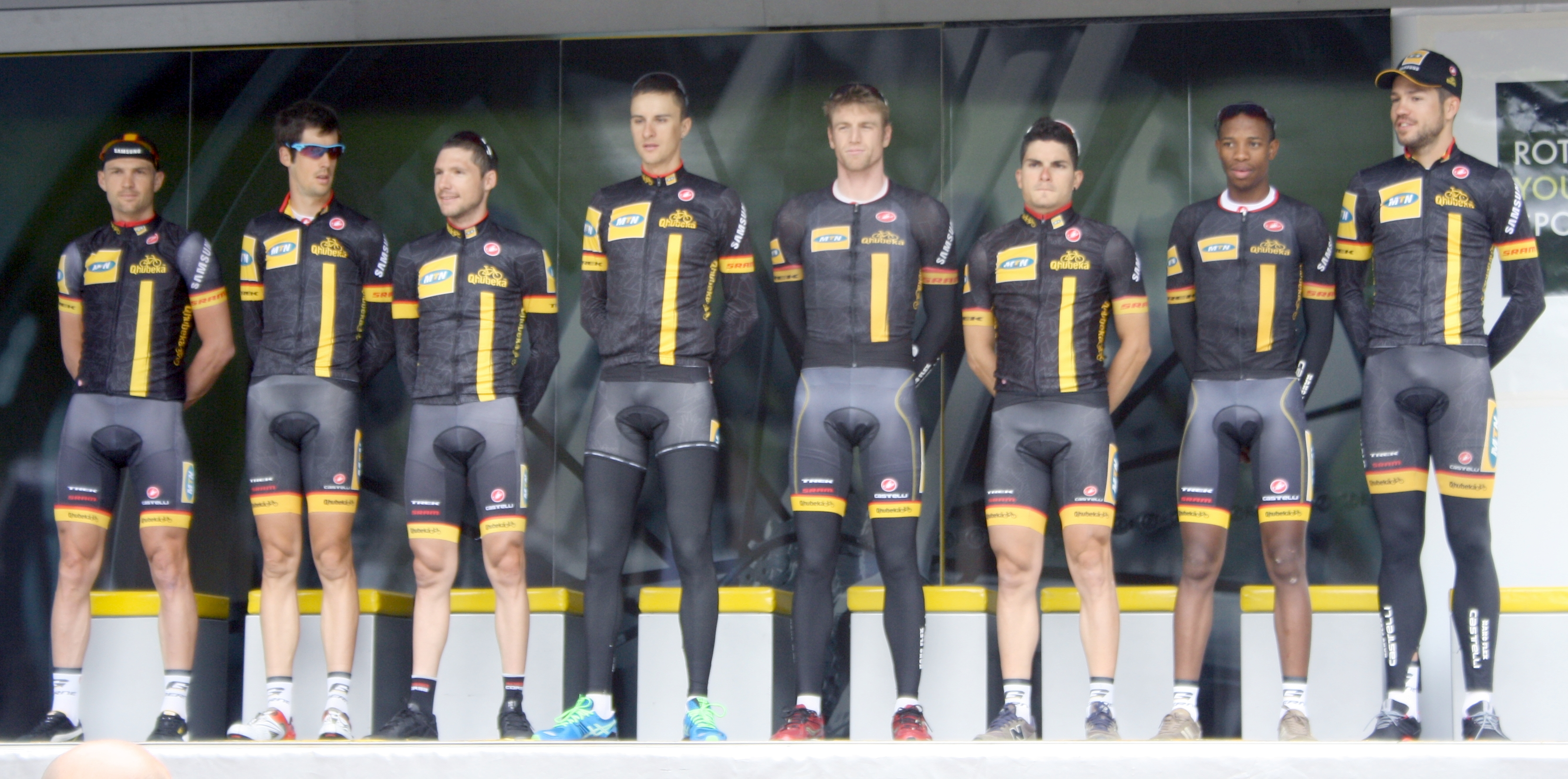
- The team at the 2014 World Ports Classic
- UCI code: MTN
- Status: UCI Professional Continental
- UCI Africa Tour ranking: 1st (402.33 points)
- Manager: Douglas Ryder; Brian Smith (July–)
- Main sponsor(s): MTN & Qhubeka
- Based: South Africa
- Bicycles: Trek
- Groupset: ?

Season victories
- One-day races: -
- Stage race overall: 1
- Stage race stages: 6
- National Championships: 3

The 2014 season for the MTN–Qhubeka cycling team began in January at the 2014 La Tropicale Amissa Bongo. The team participated in UCI Continental Circuits and UCI World Tour events when given a wildcard invitation.

== 2014 roster ==
As of 1 February 2014.

Rider	Date of birth
John-Lee Augustyn (RSA)	10 August 1986 (aged 27)
Gerald Ciolek (GER)	19 September 1986 (aged 27)
Frekalsi Debesay (ERI)	10 January 1983 (aged 31)
Nicolas Dougall (Note: Dougall joined the team on 1 July as a stagiaire.) (RSA)	21 November 1992 (aged 21)
Linus Gerdemann (GER)	16 September 1982 (aged 31)
Tsgabu Grmay (ETH)	25 August 1991 (aged 22)
Karel Hník (Note: Hník joined the team on 1 August as a stagiaire, from Etixx.) (CZE)	9 August 1991 (aged 22)
Jacques Janse van Rensburg (RSA)	6 September 1987 (aged 26)
Songezo Jim (RSA)	17 September 1990 (aged 23)
Ignatas Konovalovas (LTU)	8 December 1985 (aged 28)
Merhawi Kudus (ERI)	23 January 1994 (aged 20)
Louis Meintjes (RSA)	21 February 1992 (aged 21)
Adrien Niyonshuti (RWA)	2 February 1987 (aged 26)
Sergio Pardilla (ESP)	16 January 1984 (aged 30)

Rider	Date of birth
Bradley Potgieter (RSA)	11 May 1989 (aged 24)
Youcef Reguigui (ALG)	9 January 1990 (aged 24)
Martin Reimer (GER)	14 June 1987 (aged 26)
Meron Russom (ERI)	12 March 1982 (aged 31)
Kristian Sbaragli (ITA)	8 May 1990 (aged 23)
Andreas Stauff (GER)	22 January 1987 (aged 27)
Daniel Teklehaymanot (ERI)	10 November 1988 (aged 25)
Jani Tewelde (ERI)	1 October 1990 (aged 23)
Jay Thomson (RSA)	12 April 1986 (aged 27)
Dennis Van Niekerk (RSA)	19 October 1984 (aged 29)
Johann Van Zyl (RSA)	2 February 1991 (aged 22)
Jaco Venter (RSA)	13 February 1987 (aged 26)
Martin Wesemann (RSA)	19 March 1984 (aged 29)

Riders who joined the team for the 2014 season

Rider	2013 team
John-Lee Augustyn	ex-pro (Utensilnord–Named, 2012)
Linus Gerdemann	ex-pro (RadioShack–Nissan, 2012)
Merhawi Kudus	neo-pro (MTN-Qhubeka U23)
Daniel Teklehaymanot	Orica–GreenEDGE

== Season victories ==
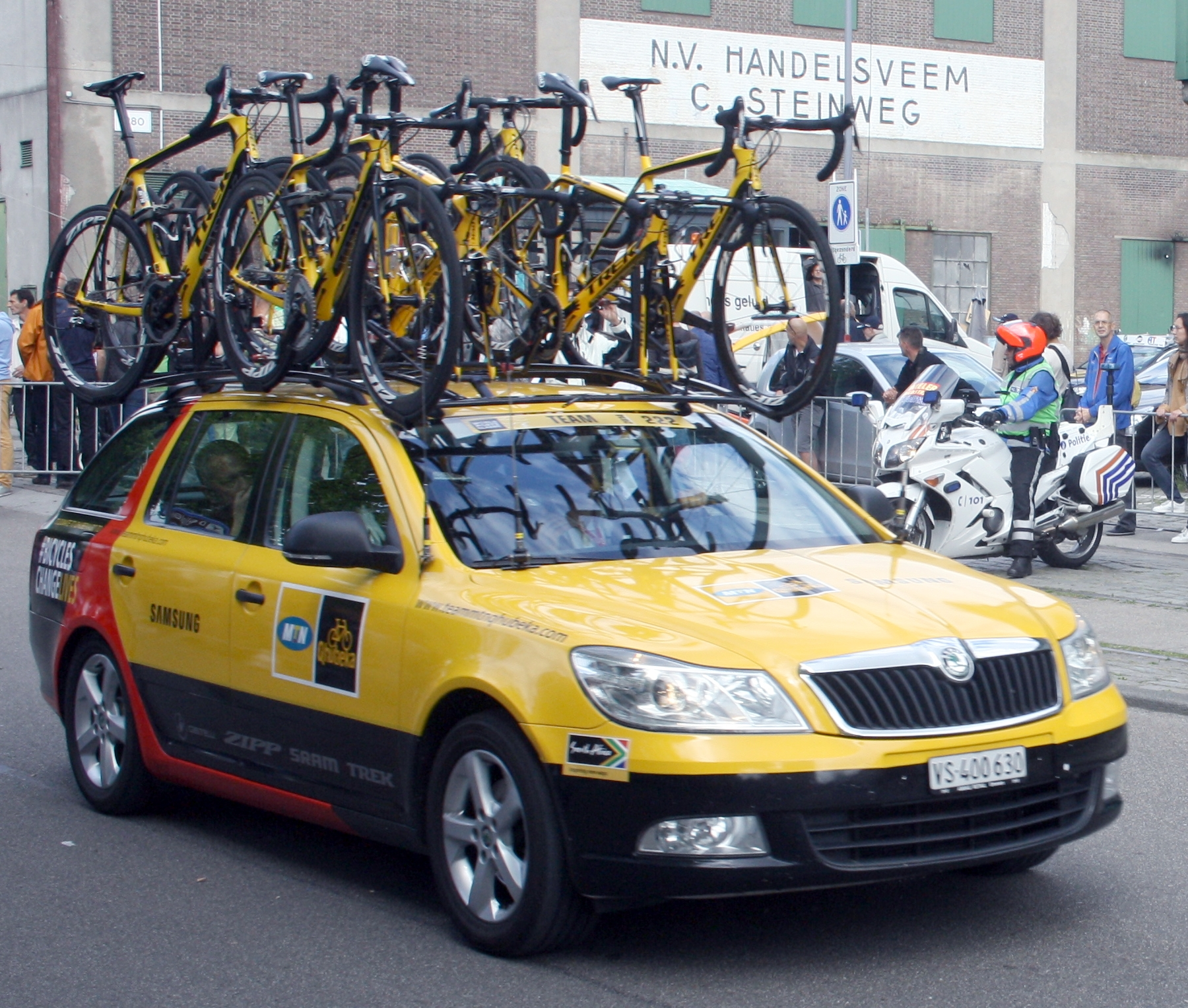
The team car

Date	Race	Competition	Rider	Country	Location
16 January	La Tropicale Amissa Bongo, Stage 4	UCI Africa Tour	Frekalsi Debesay (ERI)	Gabon	Mouila
22 February	Vuelta a Andalucía, Stage 3	UCI Europe Tour	Gerald Ciolek (GER)	Spain	Seville
8 March	Tour de Langkawi, Teams classification	UCI Asia Tour	(Note: The riders on the squad were Jacques Janse van Rensburg, John-Lee Augustyn, Louis Meintjes, Merhawi Kudus, Tsgabu Grmay and Youcef Reguigui)	Malaysia	
9 April	Mzansi Tour, Stage 1	UCI Africa Tour	Jacques Janse van Rensburg (RSA)	South Africa	Clarens
10 April	Mzansi Tour, Stage 2	UCI Africa Tour	Louis Meintjes (RSA)	South Africa	Golden Gate
11 April	Mzansi Tour, Overall	UCI Africa Tour	Jacques Janse van Rensburg (RSA)	South Africa	
11 April	Mzansi Tour, Mountains classification	UCI Africa Tour	Louis Meintjes (RSA)	South Africa	
11 April	Mzansi Tour, Young rider classification	UCI Africa Tour	Louis Meintjes (RSA)	South Africa	
25 April	Giro del Trentino, Young rider classification	UCI Europe Tour	Louis Meintjes (RSA)	Italy	
9 May	Tour d'Azerbaïdjan, Stage 3	UCI Europe Tour	Youcef Reguigui (ALG)	Azerbaijan	Qabala
10 May	Tour d'Azerbaïdjan, Stage 4	UCI Europe Tour	Linus Gerdemann (GER)	Azerbaijan	Pirqulu
11 May	Tour d'Azerbaïdjan, Mountains classification	UCI Europe Tour	Linus Gerdemann (GER)	Azerbaijan	
22 June	Route du Sud, Young rider classification	UCI Europe Tour	Merhawi Kudus (ERI)	France	
