= 1999 Tour de Langkawi =

Race details
- Dates: 3–14 February 1999
- Stages: 12
- Distance: 1,903.3 km (1,183 mi)
- Winning time: 46h 56' 18"

Results
Jersey awarded to the overall winner	Winner	Paolo Lanfranchi (ITA)	(Mapei–Quick-Step)
	Second	Sergei Ivanov (RUS)	(TVM–Farm Frites)
	Third	Allan Iacoune (AUS)	(Linda McCartney Cycling Team)
Jersey awarded to the points classification winner	Points	Graeme Miller (NZL)	(New Zealand)
Jersey awarded to the mountains classification winner	Mountains	Alessandro Petacchi (ITA)	(Navigare–Gaerne)
	Team	Mapei–Quick-Step	

The 1999 Tour de Langkawi was the 4th edition of the Tour de Langkawi, a cycling stage race that took place in Malaysia. It started on 3 February in Langkawi and ended on 14 February in Kuala Lumpur. The race was sanctioned by the Union Cycliste Internationale (UCI) as a 2.4 category race.

Italian Paolo Lanfranchi won the race, Sergei Ivanov of Russia second and Allan Iacoune of Australia third. Graeme Miller of New Zealand also won the points classification and Alessandro Petacchi of Italy won the mountains classification of the race. Mapei–Quick-Step won the team classification of the race.

== Stages ==
The cyclist competed in 12 stages with a prologue over 12 days, covering a distance of 1,903.3 kilometres.

Stage	Date	Course	Distance	Stage result		
Stage	Date	Course	Distance	Winner	Second	Third
1a	3 February	Langkawi Individual time trial	9.2 km (5.7 mi)	Lennie Kristensen (DEN)	Michael Andersson (SWE)	Graeme Miller (NZL)
1b	3 February	Langkawi Criterium	50 km (31.1 mi)	Fred Rodriguez (USA)	Graeme Miller (NZL)	René Haselbacher (AUT)
2	4 February	Kangar to George Town	165.9 km (103.1 mi)	Enrico Degano (ITA)	Graeme Miller (NZL)	Andrea Tafi (ITA)
3	5 February	Seberang Jaya to Kuala Kangsar	103 km (64.0 mi)	David McKenzie (AUS)	Chris Newton (GBR)	Rinaldo Nocentini (ITA)
4	6 February	Ipoh to Bentong	217.4 km (135.1 mi)	Stig Dam (DEN)	Johan Capiot (BEL)	Andrea Tafi (ITA)
5	7 February	Kuala Lumpur to Port Dickson	156.3 km (97.1 mi)	Moreno Di Biase (ITA)	Andrea Tafi (ITA)	René Haselbacher (AUT)
6	8 February	Malacca to Johor Bahru	223.7 km (139.0 mi)	Bjørnar Vestøl (NOR)	Grzegorz Wajs (POL)	Jacob Nielsen (DEN)
7	9 February	Kota Tinggi to Pekan	232.1 km (144.2 mi)	Enrico Degano (ITA)	Luca Cei (ITA)	Fred Rodriguez (USA)
8	10 February	Kuantan to Kuala Terengganu	197.1 km (122.5 mi)	Eric Wohlberg (CAN)	Vadim Kravchenko (KAZ)	Michael Barry (CAN)
9	11 February	Kuala Terengganu to Kota Bharu	155.5 km (96.6 mi)	Rinaldo Nocentini (ITA)	Bart Bowen (USA)	Michael Andersson (SWE)
10	12 February	Pasir Mas to Gerik	197.2 km (122.5 mi)	Rinaldo Nocentini (ITA)	Alessandro Petacchi (ITA)	Marcin Gebka (POL)
11	13 February	Tapah to Genting Highlands	126.3 km (78.5 mi)	Marcus Ljungqvist (SWE)	Peter Wrolich (AUT)	Sergei Ivanov (RUS)
12	14 February	Kuala Lumpur Criterium	69.6 km (43.2 mi)	Luca Cei (ITA)	Graeme Miller (NZL)	Marcin Gebka (POL)

== Classification leadership ==
Stage	Stage winner	General classification	Points classification	Mountains classification	Asian rider classification	Team classification	Asian team classification
1a	Lennie Kristensen	Lennie Kristensen	Lennie Kristensen	Michael Andersson	Tang Xuezhong	Mapei–Quick-Step	Japan
1b	Fred Rodriguez	Lennie Kristensen	Graeme Miller	Michael Andersson	Tang Xuezhong	Mapei–Quick-Step	Japan
2	Enrico Degano	Graeme Miller	Graeme Miller	Michael Andersson	Tang Xuezhong	Mapei–Quick-Step	Japan
3	David McKenzie	Graeme Miller	Graeme Miller	Alessandro Petacchi	Tang Xuezhong	Mapei–Quick-Step	Japan
4	Stig Dam	Michael Andersson	Graeme Miller	Dominique Perras	Tang Xuezhong	Mapei–Quick-Step	Japan
5	Moreno Di Biase	Frank McCormack	Graeme Miller	Alessandro Petacchi	Hideto Yukinari	Mapei–Quick-Step	Japan
6	Bjørnar Vestøl	Frank McCormack	Graeme Miller	Alessandro Petacchi	Hideto Yukinari	Mapei–Quick-Step	Japan
7	Enrico Degano	Frank McCormack	Graeme Miller	Alessandro Petacchi	Hideto Yukinari	Acceptcard	Japan
8	Eric Wohlberg	Morten Sonne	Graeme Miller	Alessandro Petacchi	Hideto Yukinari	Acceptcard	Japan
9	Rinaldo Nocentini	Morten Sonne	Graeme Miller	Alessandro Petacchi	Hideto Yukinari	Saturn	Japan
10	Rinaldo Nocentini	Alessandro Petacchi	Graeme Miller	Alessandro Petacchi	Hideto Yukinari	Saturn	Malaysia
11	Marcus Ljungqvist	Paolo Lanfranchi	Graeme Miller	Alessandro Petacchi	Hideto Yukinari	Mapei–Quick-Step	Malaysia
12	Luca Cei	Paolo Lanfranchi	Graeme Miller	Alessandro Petacchi	Hideto Yukinari	Mapei–Quick-Step	Malaysia
Final		Paolo Lanfranchi	Graeme Miller	Alessandro Petacchi	Hideto Yukinari	Mapei–Quick-Step	Malaysia

== Final standings ==
=== General classification ===
	Rider	Team	Time
1	Paolo Lanfranchi (ITA)	Mapei–Quick-Step	46h 56' 18"
2	Sergei Ivanov (RUS)	TVM–Farm Frites	+ 26"
3	Allan Iacoune (AUS)	Linda McCartney Cycling Team	+ 02' 27"
4	Danny Jonasson (DEN)	Acceptcard	+ 02' 34"
5	Levi Leipheimer (USA)	Saturn	+ 02' 55"
6	Morten Sonne (DEN)	Acceptcard	+ 03' 16"
7	Alessandro Petacchi (ITA)	Navigare–Gaerne	+ 05' 31"
8	Uwe Peschel (GER)	Gerolsteiner	+ 05' 34"
9	Czeslaw Lukaszewicz (CAN)	Canada	+ 05' 48"
10	Uwe Ampler (GER)	Agro-Adler	+ 07' 12"

=== Points classification ===
	Rider	Team	Points
1	Graeme Miller (NZL)	New Zealand	125
2	Fred Rodriguez (USA)	Mapei–Quick-Step	105
3	René Haselbacher (AUT)	Gerolsteiner	80
4	Johan Capiot (BEL)	TVM–Farm Frites	77
5	Rinaldo Nocentini (ITA)	Mapei–Quick-Step	73
6	Enrico Degano (ITA)	Navigare–Gaerne	70
7	Luca Cei (ITA)	Navigare–Gaerne	55
8	Alessandro Petacchi (ITA)	Navigare–Gaerne	52
9	Moreno Di Biase (ITA)	Cantina Tollo–Alexia Alluminio	48
10	Michael Andersson (SWE)	Acceptcard	44

=== Mountains classification ===
	Rider	Team	Points
1	Alessandro Petacchi (ITA)	Navigare–Gaerne	47
2	Sergei Ivanov (RUS)	TVM–Farm Frites	45
3	Paolo Lanfranchi (ITA)	Mapei–Quick-Step	39
4	Ole Sigurd Simensen (NOR)	Agro-Adler	32
5	Massimo Giunti (ITA)	Cantina Tollo–Alexia Alluminio	31
6	Marcus Ljungqvist (SWE)	Cantina Tollo–Alexia Alluminio	25
7	Rinaldo Nocentini (ITA)	Mapei–Quick-Step	24
8	Dominique Perras (CAN)	Canada	23
9	Peter Wrolich (AUT)	Gerolsteiner	22
10	Michael Andersson (SWE)	Acceptcard	19

=== Asian rider classification ===
	Rider	Team	Time
1	Hideto Yukinari (JPN)	Japan	47h 12' 58"
2	Shahrulneeza Razali (MAS)	Malaysia	+ 04' 54"
3	Victor Espiritu (PHI)	Philippines	+ 09' 16"
4	Tsen Seong Hoong (MAS)	Malaysia	+ 10' 44"
5	Nor Effandy Rosli (MAS)	Malaysia	+ 19' 45"
6	Tang Xuezhong (CHN)	China	+ 20' 02"
7	Yoshiyuki Abe (JPN)	Japan	+ 21' 26"
8	Wang Rongshuang (CHN)	China	+ 23' 14"
9	Sulistiyono Sulistiyono (INA)	Indonesia	+ 34' 41"
10	Mohamad Suhaimi Keton (MAS)	Malaysia	+ 37' 17"

=== Team classification ===
	Team	Time
1	Mapei–Quick-Step	140h 58' 19"
2	Acceptcard	+ 02' 45"
3	Saturn	+ 04' 27"
4	Gerolsteiner	+ 06' 36"
5	Agro-Adler	+ 20' 45"
6	TVM–Farm Frites	+ 24' 39"
7	Canada	+ 34' 25"
8	Cantina Tollo–Alexia Alluminio	+ 43' 02"
9	Linda McCartney Cycling Team	+ 46' 54"
10	Denmark	+ 52' 12"

=== Asian team classification ===
	Team	Time
1	Malaysia	141h 52' 25"
2	Japan	+ 23' 49"
3	China	+ 01h 05' 12"
4	Philippines	+ 01h 14' 52"
5	Indonesia	+ 02h 46' 10"
