= Peter Rogers (cyclist) =

Australian cyclist

Peter John Rogers (born 24 October 1974 in Barham, New South Wales) is a former Australian professional road racing cyclist.

== Cycling career ==
Peter is the oldest of three brothers, all successful cyclists His younger brother Dean Rogers was the first ever Australian Junior World Champion, winning the Time Trial in Quito, Ecuador in 1994. His youngest brother, Michael Rogers is a professional cyclist. who has won three world time-trial championships.

Peter started competitive cycling at age 11 with the Griffith Cycling Club. After a racing season in The Netherlands, he turned professional in 1997 at age 23 with the Giant-Australian Institute of Sport team under the GIANT-AIS Sports Director and Australian National Coach, German born Heiko Salzwedel. During this period the team's European headquarters were in Koblenz/Hahn, Germany.

He represented Australia in the road race and time trial at the 1998 Commonwealth Games in Kuala Lumpur, Malaysia, he helped Jay Sweet win the gold medal in the road race and finished 9th in the time trial.

In 2001 Peter signed for the infamous Linda McCartney Racing Team and was to join the outfit that nurtured the likes of Chris Froome and Bradley Wiggins but the team failed to start its European program after it was declared bankrupt, leaving riders and team personnel without a job. Peter was unable to find an appropriate contract for the remainder of the year.

Peter represented Australia at 2 professional world championships in 1997 (San Sebastien) and 1998 (Verona). In 1998, after the dissolution of the Australian GIANT-AIS Cycling Team, Rogers then went, along with GIANT-AIS teammate Matt White through Italian team Amore & Vita–ForzArcore (1998) and to various German teams, such as Olympia-Die Continentale (1999), Team Hohenfelder-Concorde (2000) and the Australian-based team Iteamnova.com in 2002 before he retired from road racing. Rogers lives in Canberra, Australia.

== Proteams ==
- 1997 GIANT-Australian Institute of Sport
- 1998 Amore & Vita–ForzArcore
- 1999 Die Continentale-Olympia
- 2000 Team Hohenfelder-Concorde
- 2001 Linda McCartney Racing Team
- 2002 iTeamnova.com

== Palmares ==
1996
2nd Overall Olympia's Tour (The Netherlands)
2nd Overall U23 Tour of Sweden
3rd Overall Hessen Rundfahrt (GER)
1st. Stage 5 Commonwealth Bank Cycle Classic (AUS)
1st. Stage 14 Commonwealth Bank Cycle Classic (AUS)
1997
2nd Stage 1 Bayclassic Crit. Series (AUS)
3rd Overall Tour of Japan
3rd Overall Commonwealth Bank Cycle Classic (AUS)
5th Overall CoreStates Invitational (USA)
8th Overall Hessen Rundfahrt (GER)
1999
1st Stage 2a Rheinland-Pfalz Rundfahrt (GER)
1st Stage 1 Herald Sun Tour (AUS)
2001
2nd Stage 5 Tour Down Under
2002
2nd Stage 7 herald Sun Tour
1st Stage 1 TTT Tour of Southland (NZL)
