= Tsgabu Grmay =

Ethiopian road bicycle racer

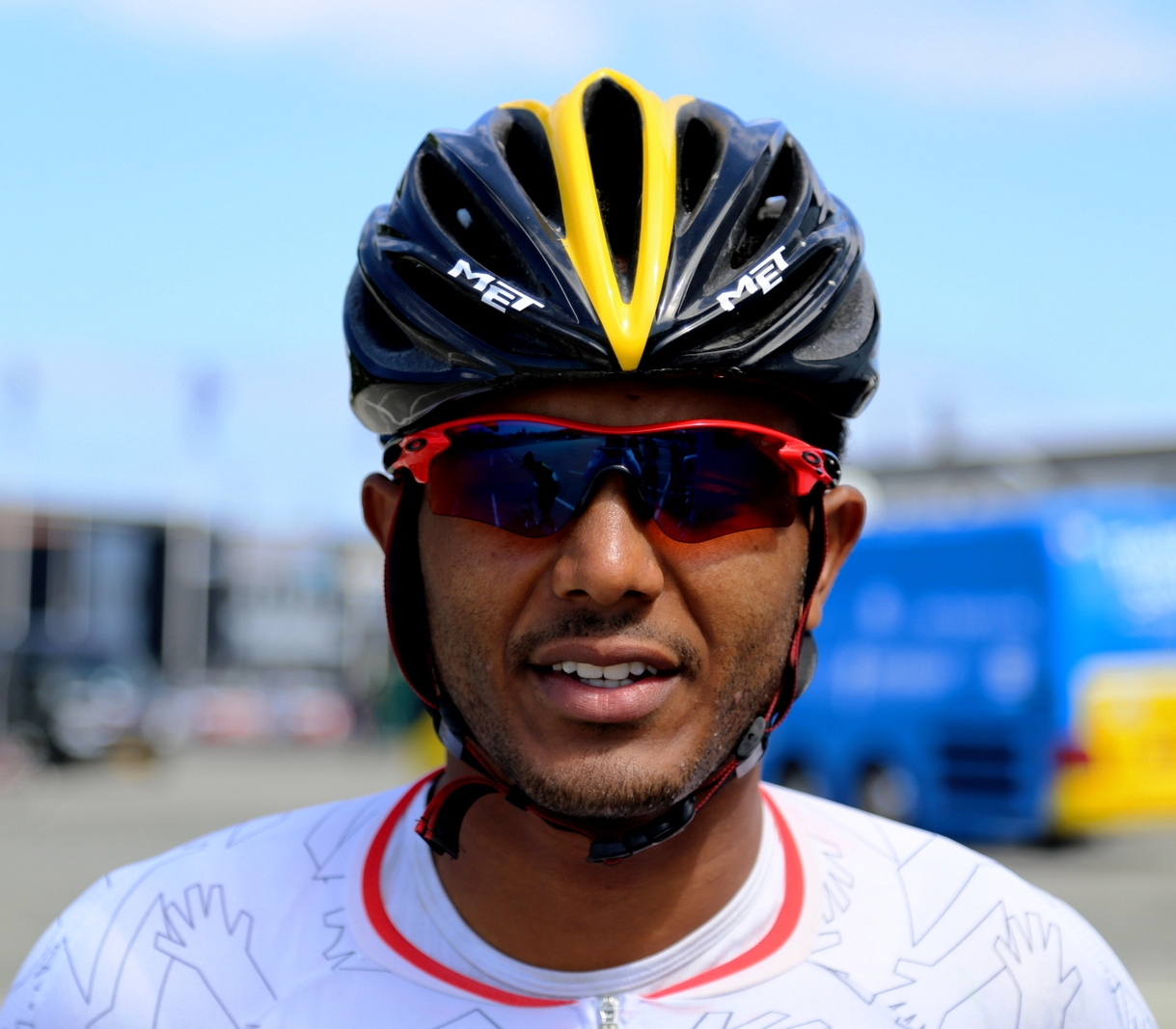
- Tsgabu at the 2014 Tour des Fjords

Personal information
- Full name: Tsgabu Gebremaryam Grmay
- Nickname: Gmail
- Born: 25 August 1991 (age 35) Mekelle, Ethiopia
- Height: 175 cm (5 ft 9 in)
- Weight: 63 kg (139 lb)

Cycling career
- Sport: Cycling
- Discipline: Road
- Role: Rider
- Rider type: Climber

Amateur team
- 2011–2012: World Cycling Centre

Professional teams
- 2012–2014: MTN–Qhubeka
- 2015–2016: Lampre–Merida
- 2017: Bahrain–Merida
- 2018: Trek–Segafredo
- 2019–2023: Mitchelton–Scott

Major wins
- One-day races and Classics African Continental Time Trial Championships (2015) National Road Race Championships (2013–2015) National Time Trial Championships (2013–2015, 2017–2019, 2023)
Medal record
Men's road cycling
Representing Ethiopia
African Road Championships
Gold medal – first place	2015 Wartburg	Time trial
Gold medal – first place	2012 Ouagadougou	Under-23 time trial
Silver medal – second place	2012 Ouagadougou	Time trial
Silver medal – second place	2016 Benslimane	Time trial
Bronze medal – third place	2015 Wartburg	Team time trial
Bronze medal – third place	2021 Cairo	Mixed team relay

Tsgabu Gebremaryam Grmay (Tigrinya: ጽጋቡ ገብረማርያም ግርማይ; born 25 August 1991) is an Ethiopian retired professional road cyclist from Tigray, who last rode for UCI WorldTeam Team Jayco–AlUla. He is a three time national road race champion, six time national time trial champion, and one time African time trial champion. Tsgabu became the first Ethiopian professional cyclist when he joined MTN–Qhubeka in 2012. In 2013 Tsgabu became the first Ethiopian to win an international cycling event when he won the fifth stage of the Tour de Taiwan. He made his UCI World Tour debut at the 2013 Giro di Lombardia.

== Biography ==
Tsgabu grew up near the city of Mekelle, Tigray at an altitude of 2400 metres. He comes from a sporting family, with a father and a brother who competed in local bike races in Ethiopia. As an amateur rider he received training at the African UCI Continental Center in Potchefstroom, South Africa and the World Cycling Centre in Aigle, Switzerland.

=== 2010 season ===
In November 2010 Tsgabu came sixth at the African Continental Cycling Championships individual time trial in Kigali, Rwanda. He then stayed in Kigali to race the Tour of Rwanda which began five days later. He finished fifth overall.

=== 2011 season ===
Tsgabu began his season in January 2011 at La Tropicale Amissa Bongo, which he finished in 13th place overall. In February he finished 21st in the Tour of South Africa. In April he came 51st in La Côte Picarde in France and 16th at the Ster ZLM Toer in the Netherlands. He then travelled to Quebec in June to race the Coupe des nations Ville Saguenay which he finished in 18th place overall. In July Tsgabu returned to France for more stage racing. He finished 31st in the Tour Alsace, 42nd in the Mi-Août Bretonne, and 19th in the Tour de l'Avenir. Tsgabu ended the season in Denmark in September representing Ethiopia at the 2011 UCI Road World Championships by participating in the men's under-23 road race which he abandoned.

=== 2012 season ===
Tsgabu began the 2012 season in April with a 71st place at the Ronde Van Vlaanderen Beloften. He raced two races in the Netherlands and then headed back to Africa for La Tropicale Amissa Bongo in Gabon, which he finished in 11th place. He also came fourth in the young rider classification, 19 seconds behind winner Nikita Stalnov of the Continental Team Astana. In May Tsgabu finished 19th in the Flèche du Sud, coming fifth in the young rider classification. He was 43rd in the Tour de Gironde.

Following the Ronde van Zeeland Seaports, which he did not finish but was won by his future teammate Reinardt Janse van Rensburg, Tsgabu joined the South African UCI Continental team MTN–Qhubeka for the remainder of their 2012 season. In August Tsgabu entered the 2012 Volta a Portugal. He was 17th in the prologue, but finished 82nd overall and 25th in the young rider classification. Tsgabu raced the Kernen Omloop Echt-Susteren as a warm-up for the 2012 UCI Road World Championships in Valkenburg, Netherlands where he was the only Ethiopian competitor. He finished 25th in the men's under-23 time trial and 87th in the men's under-23 road race. Tsgabu ended his season in November by winning silver at the African Continental Championships individual time trial and gold in the men's under-23 individual time trial in Ouagadougou, Burkina Faso. He finished 38th in the road race.

In October 2012 it was announced that Tsgabu's contract had been extended for the 2013 season, and he became the first Ethiopian professional cyclist when MTN-Qhubeka became a UCI Professional Continental team.

=== 2013 season ===
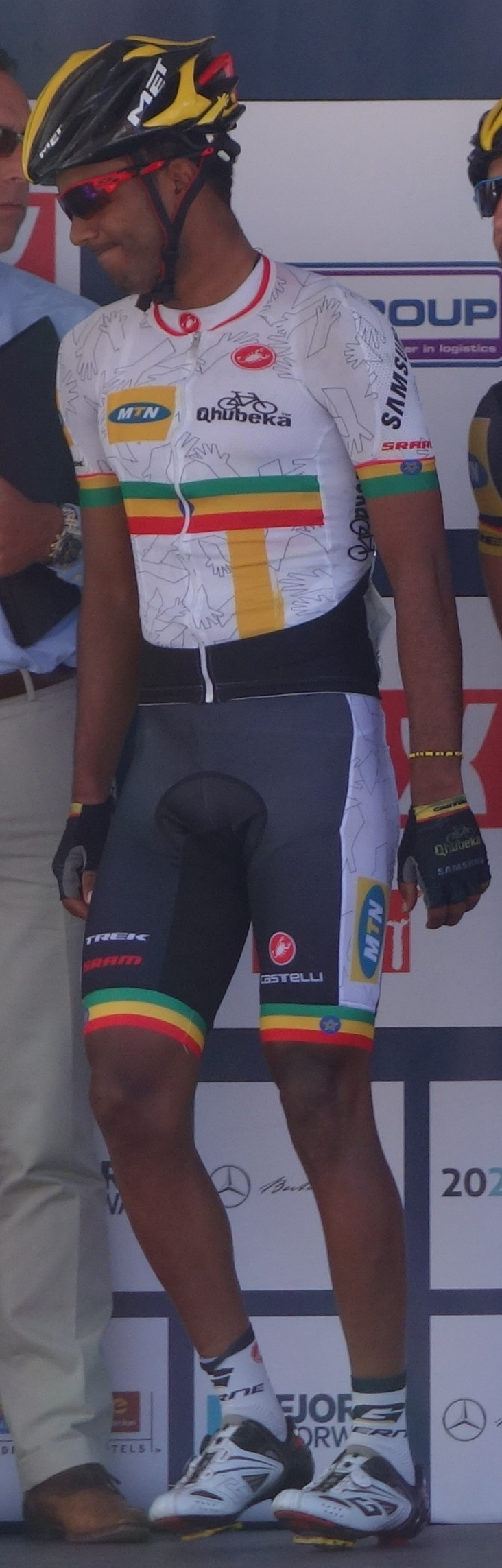
Tsgabu wearing his national champions jersey

Tsgabu's second season at MTN–Qhubeka saw the team rise to the second highest level in cycling, becoming the first ever African UCI Professional Continental team. Tsgabu began the 2013 season in January at La Tropicale Amissa Bongo in Gabon, finishing fifth overall and third in the young rider classification as well as coming second in the team classification. He narrowly missed out of a stage victory on the final day, crossing the finishing line in Libreville two seconds behind stage winner Gert Dockx of Lotto–Belisol.

In February Tsgabu participated in the 2013 Tour de Langkawi in Malaysia finishing ninth overall, 2' 58" behind winner Julián Arredondo. MTN-Qhubeka won the team classification by nine minutes before the second placed Tabriz Petrochemical Team.

In March 2013 Tsgabu became the first Ethiopian ever to win an international cycling event when he won the fifth stage of the Tour de Taiwan in Taoyuan County ten seconds ahead of Mohammad Saufi Mat Senan. The stage victory propelled him to second place overall, a position he managed to keep for the remaining stages. It also netted him 10 mountain points, which helped him to fourth position overall in the mountains classification.

At the 2013 Giro del Trentino in April Tsgabu finished 21st in the youth classification and 94th overall. In May he finished 73rd in the 2013 Tour of Norway. In July Tsgabu won both the national road race championship and the national time trial championship of Ethiopia in Bahir Dar for the first time. He headed to the United States of America in August, to race the Tour of Elk Grove and the 2013 Tour of Utah. He finished 42nd overall in the first and 27th overall in the second of the two stage races, as well as third in the young rider classification in Utah (15' 32" behind youth classification winner Lachlan Morton). After this he flew to Norway to ride the Tour des Fjords, but was forced to abandon after the fourth stage. Towards the end of August Tsgabu entered four single day races in Italy, receiving modest results in two races and abandoning the two others. At the Settimana Ciclistica Lombarda in September Tsgabu was 24th overall and seventh in the young rider classification.

Tsgabu was the sole representative of Ethiopia at the 2013 UCI Road World Championships in Tuscany. He participated in the men's under-23 time trial, which he finished in 50th place, as well as the men's under-23 road race which he was forced to abandon. Tsgabu was in the last group to cross the finish line in the 2013 Milano–Torino. He made his UCI World Tour debut at the 2013 Il Lombardia, but did not finish the race. Tsgabu ended his season in Europe with three one-day races in Italy during October, abandoning two of them and finishing 78th in the Gran Premio Bruno Beghelli. He then rounded off his season in December at the African Continental Championships, where he finished seventh in the time trial and 28th in the road race.

=== 2014 season ===
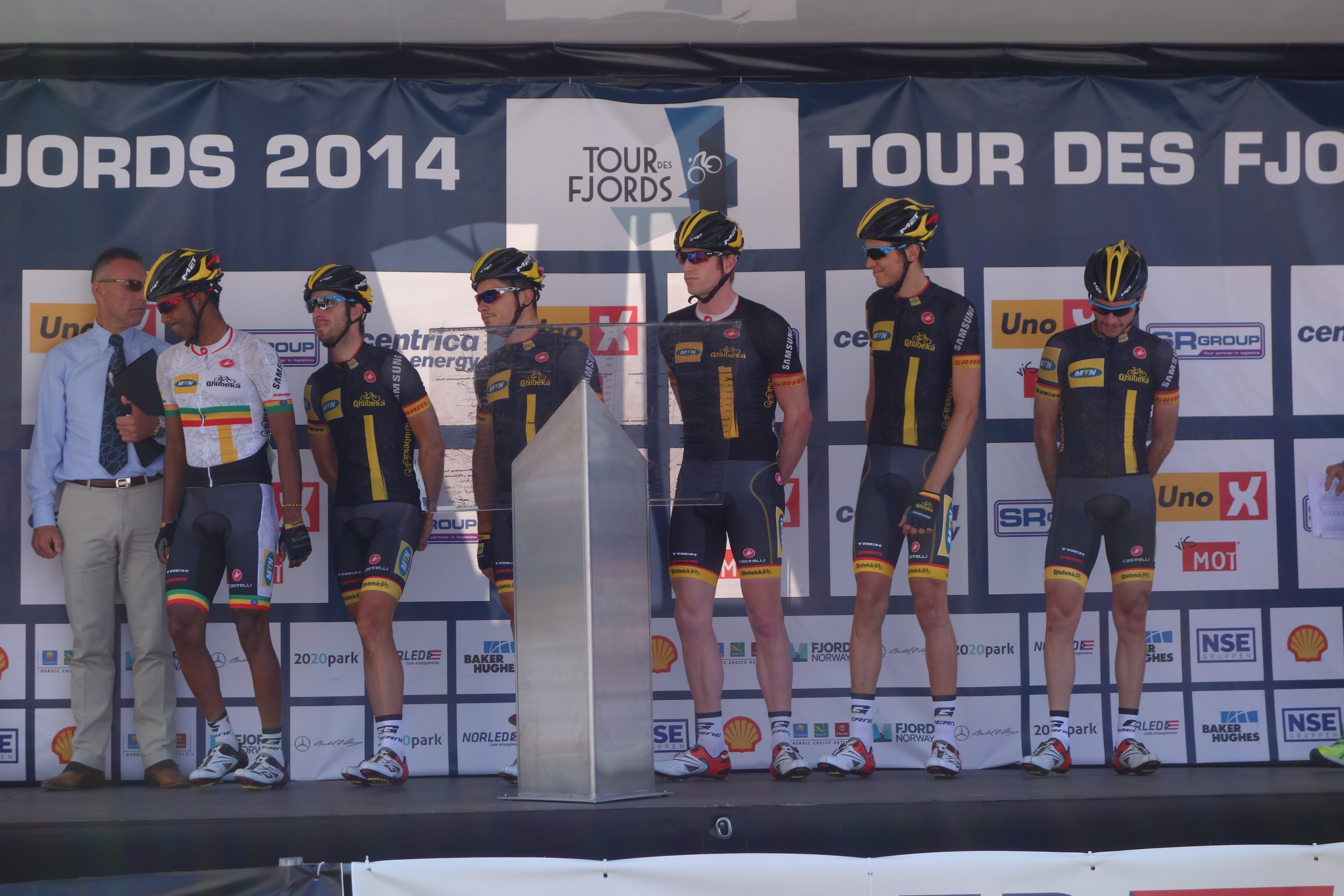
Grmay (far left) as part of the MTN–Qhubeka team at the team presentation at stage one of the 2014 Tour des Fjords.

The 2014 season was Tsgabu's third season with MTN–Qhubeka and began in February at the 2014 Tour de Langkawi. He aimed for a podium finish but could not repeat the success he had the previous year, and finished 52nd overall. However, MTN–Qhubeka did manage to win the team classification for a second consecutive year. Tsgabu did little racing during the spring, and abandoned the Gran Premio Nobili Rubinetterie, the Tour de Picardie, and the 2014 Tour of Norway. At the end of May he participated in the Tour des Fjords, finishing 70th overall and coming in second in the mountains classification only seven points behind winner Amets Txurruka of Caja Rural–Seguros RGA.

At the Tour de Korea in June he finished 10th overall. Tsgabu abandoned on the second stage of the Route du Sud, and came 58th in the Giro dell'Appennino. At the end of June he won both the road race and the individual time trial at the Ethiopian 2014 national road cycling championships for a second time. In August Tsgabu finished 51st in the 2014 Vuelta a Burgos and 56th at the Tour du Limousin. He was 11th in the young rider classification in Limousin, 11 seconds behind Otto Vergaerde of Topsport Vlaanderen–Baloise who came in 10th. Tsgabu finished 65th in the final edition of the Châteauroux Classic. At the Memorial Marco Pantani Tsgabu was part of the initial five man breakaway. They gained four minutes on the peloton but were caught, and he didn't finish the race. Of the six other Italian one day races Tsgabu entered in September and October he only finished the final one, ending his time at MTN-Qhubeka with a second-to-last place in the Gran Premio Bruno Beghelli.

=== 2015 season ===
Tsgabu left MTN–Qhubeka at the end of 2014 and joined the highest level of professional cycling at the Italian UCI ProTeam Lampre–Merida, becoming the first Ethiopian to ride for them. Joining Lampre meant he would be guaranteed to race at UCI World Tour races during the 2015 season. Tsgabu began the season in January as the team's candidate for the general classification at the 2015 Tour Down Under. He finished 11th overall and fifth in the young rider classification.

In February Tsgabu competed at the African Continental Championships in Wartburg, South Africa. He finished third in the team time trial, and two days later won the individual time trial. Tsgabu was the first Ethiopian to ever win an African Continental Championship. In the road race three days later Tsgabu finished fifth, 2' 35" behind winner and former teammate Louis Meintjes of MTN–Qhubeka. Tsgabu rode the 2015 Tirreno–Adriatico in March. He finished 51st overall, and came eighth in the young rider classification only 16 seconds behind Peter Sagan of Tinkoff–Saxo. He started the 2015 Giro d'Italia in San Lorenzo al Mare, becoming the first Ethiopian rider to compete in a Grand Tour. For the third time in his career, he won the Ethiopian national championship in both road and time trial events. He was named in the start list for the 2015 Vuelta a España.

=== 2016 season ===
In July 2016 Tsgabu participated in the Tour de France for the Lampre–Merida team.

== Major results ==
2010
5th Overall Tour du Rwanda
6th Time trial, African Road Championships
2011
5th Overall Toscana-Terra di Ciclismo
2012
African Road Championships

1st Under-23 time trial
2nd Time trial

2013 (3 pro wins)
National Road Championships

1st Time trial
1st Road race

2nd Overall Tour de Taiwan

1st Stage 5

5th Overall La Tropicale Amissa Bongo
9th Overall Tour de Langkawi
2014 (2)
National Road Championships

1st Time trial
1st Road race

10th Overall Tour de Korea
2015 (3)
African Road Championships

1st Time trial
3rd Team time trial
5th Road race

National Road Championships

1st Time trial
1st Road race

10th Overall Tour of Qinghai Lake
2016
African Road Championships

2nd Time trial
9th Road race

2017 (1)
1st Time trial, National Road Championships
5th Overall Tour of Oman
2018 (1)
1st Time trial, National Road Championships
2019 (1)
1st Time trial, National Road Championships
2021
African Road Championships

3rd Mixed team relay
5th Time trial
5th Road race

2023 (1)
1st Time trial, National Road Championships

=== Grand Tour general classification results timeline ===
Grand Tour	2015	2016	2017	2018	2019	2020
Giro d'Italia	91	—	—	—	—	—
Tour de France	—	92	73	DNF	—	—
Vuelta a España	125	62	—	—	62	54

Legend
—	Did not compete
DNF	Did not finish
