= Peter Rogers (disambiguation) =

Peter Rogers (1914–2009) was an English film producer.

Peter Rogers may also refer to:

- Peter Rogers (businessman) (1947–2020), British businessman, chief executive of Babcock International Group
- Peter Rogers (politician) (1940–2025), Welsh Conservative politician
- Peter Rogers (rugby union) (born 1969), former Wales international rugby union player
- Peter Rogers (cyclist) (born 1974), former Australian professional road racing cyclist
- Pete Rogers, see 1986 British Saloon Car Championship season
