= Danny Jonasson =

Danish cyclist

Personal information
- Born: 1 October 1974 (age 52) Hørsholm, Denmark

Cycling career
- Sport: Cycling
- Current team: Retired
- Discipline: Road
- Role: Rider

Professional teams
- 1997–1998: Rabobank
- 1999: Acceptcard Pro Cycling
- 2000: Team Fakta
- 2001–2002: CSC–Tiscali

Danny Jonasson (born 1 October 1974) is a Danish former road cyclist. Professional from 1997 to 2002, he notably competed in the 2002 Giro d'Italia and the 1997 Vuelta a España.

== Major results ==
1998
1st Stage 3a Regio-Tour
1st Stage 5 GP Tell
1999
3rd GP Herning
4th Overall Tour de Langkawi
5th GP Aarhus
2000
2nd Rund um die Hainleite-Erfurt
4th Overall Tour de Normandie
5th Grand Prix Midtbank
6th Cholet-Pays de Loire
6th GP Aarhus
9th Sparkassen Giro Bochum
2001
1st Stage 5 Rheinland-Pfalz Rundfahrt
