= Federico Colonna =

Italian cyclist

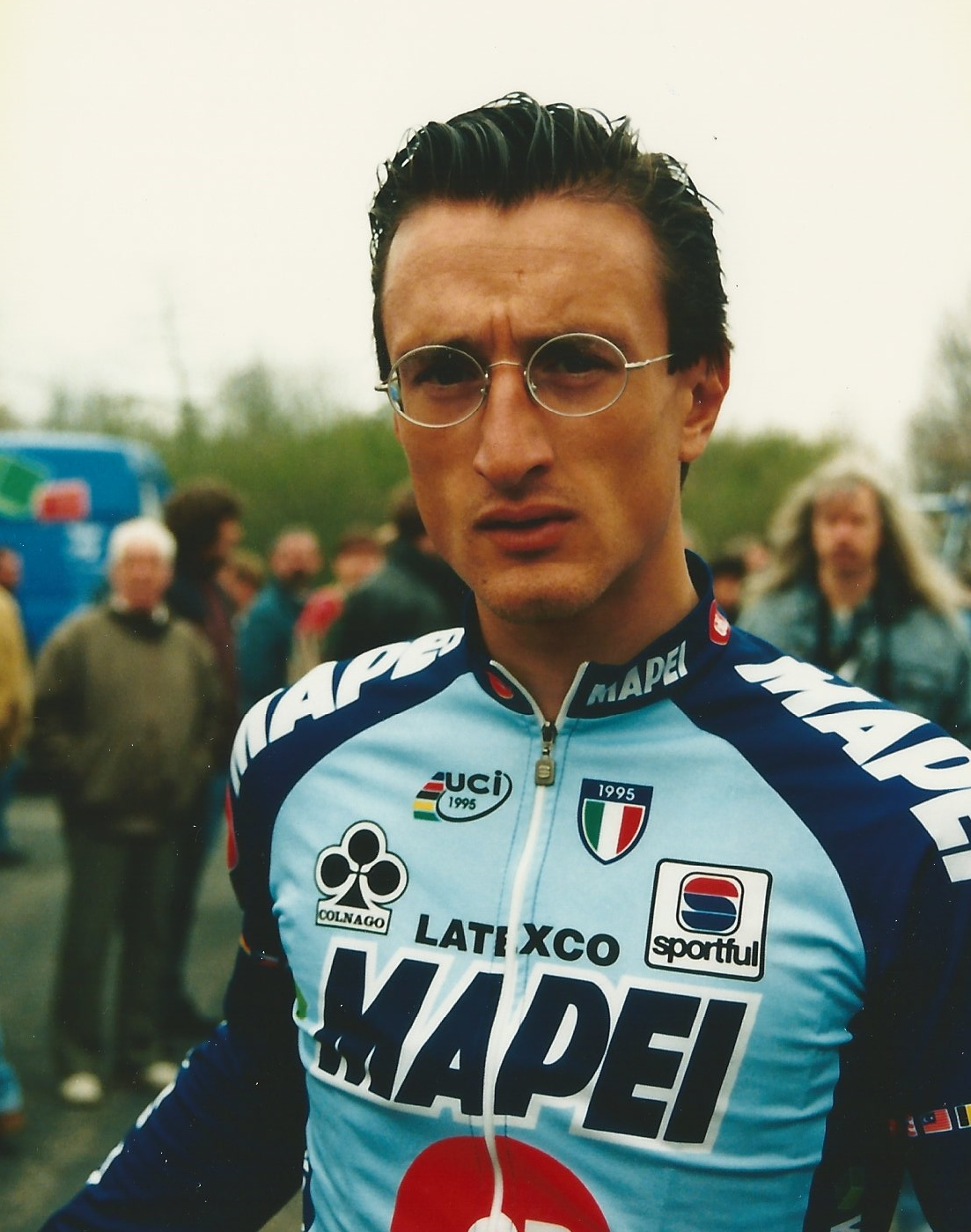

Personal information
- Born: 17 August 1972 (age 54) Fucecchio, Italy

Cycling career
- Sport: Cycling
- Current team: Retired
- Discipline: Road
- Role: Rider

Professional teams
- 1994–1996: Mapei–CLAS
- 1997–1998: Asics–CGA
- 1999: home–Jack & Jones
- 2000–2001: Cantina Tollo–Regain

Federico Colonna (born 17 August 1972) is an Italian former professional road racing cyclist.

== Major results ==
1992
2nd Circuito del Porto
1993
1st Circuito del Porto
1994
1st Stage 4 Vuelta a Murcia
1st Stage 2 Vuelta a Castilla y León
1st Stage 3 Herald Sun Tour
1995
1st Overall Clásica de Alcobendas
1st Stage 2 Four Days of Dunkirk
1st Stages 2, 4 & 5 Vuelta a Castilla y León
1996
1st Stage 1 Ronde van Nederland
1st Trofeo Manacor
1st Stage 2 Circuit de la Sarthe
1st Stage 2 Tour de Pologne
1st Stage 8 Tour DuPont
3rd Paris–Camembert
3rd Trofeo Alcudia
5th Clásica de Almería
1997
1st Gran Premio Città di Rio Saliceto e Correggio
1998
1st Stages 3 & 5 Volta a la Comunitat Valenciana
1st Gran Premio Città di Rio Saliceto e Correggio
2001
1st Stage 12 Tour de Langkawi

=== Grand Tour general classification results timeline ===
Grand Tour	1997	1998	1999	2000
Giro d'Italia	—	155	—	—
Tour de France	—	—	—	—
Vuelta a España	DNF	—	—	121

Legend
—	Did not compete
DNF	Did not finish
