= Heiko Salzwedel =

German cyclist (1957–2021)

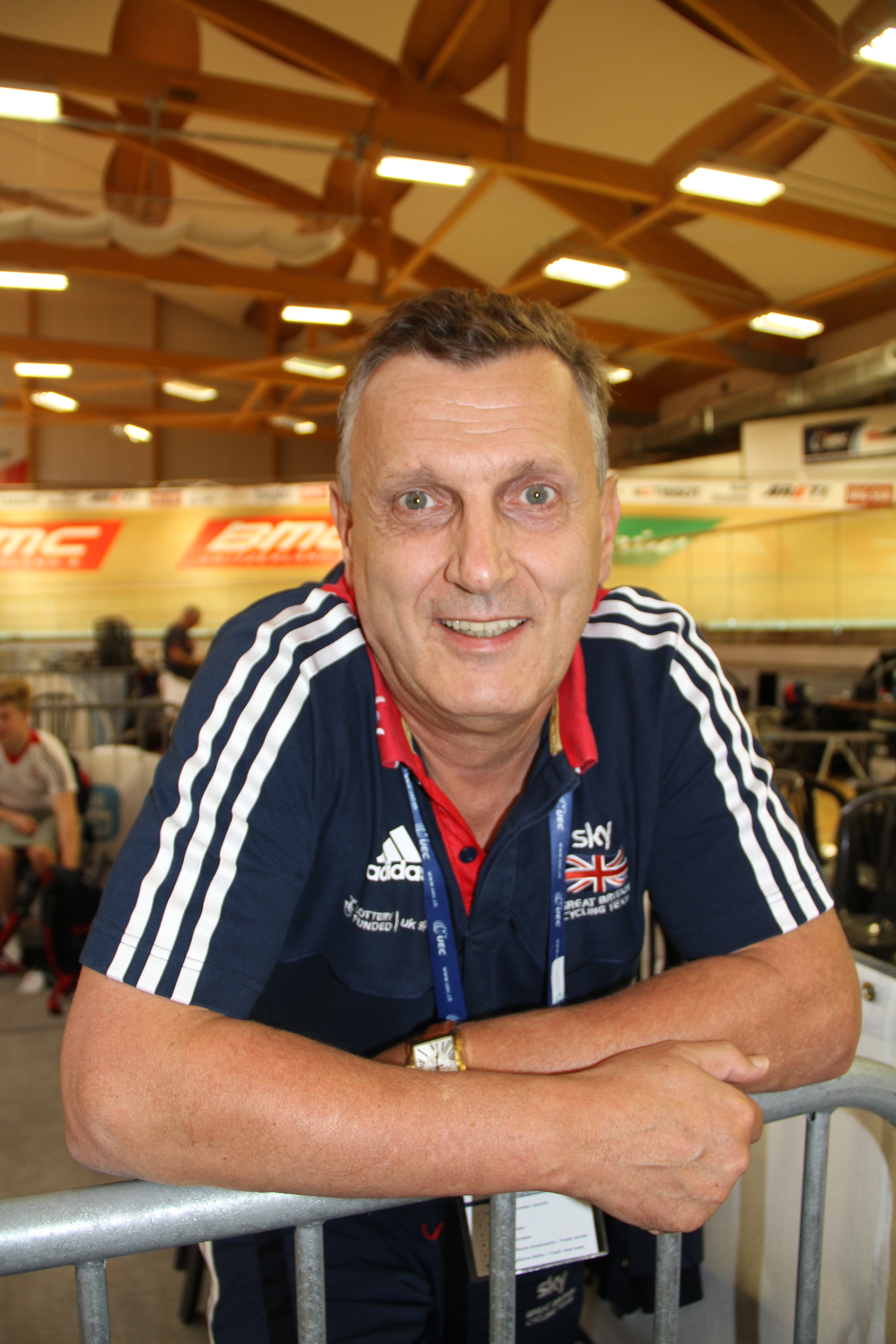
Salzwedel at the 2015 UEC European Track Championships

Heiko Salzwedel (16 April 1957 – 29 September 2021) was a German cycling coach and team manager.

== Coaching career ==
Salzwedel was born in Schmalkalden. After moving from his native East Germany to Australia in 1990, he set up the Australian Institute of Sport Road Cycling/MTB programme in Canberra. World class riders, such as Robbie McEwen, Cadel Evans, Patrick Jonker, Henk Vogels, Matt White, Nick Gates and Kathy Watt, emerged from this programme.

In 1996, as a part of the campaign to include professional riders and races in the preparation towards the Sydney Olympics 2000, he was creating the first UCI registered Australian Trade Team: the GIANT-Australian Institute of Sport Cycling Team (GIANT-AIS; later: ZVVZ-GIANT-AIS).

In 1998, he returned to Europe, working briefly as Performance Director of the German Cycling Federation (BDR) before switching to UK Sport’s Lottery funded “Monitoring & Evaluation” unit in 2000. In 2001, he moved on to work as the Performance Manager at British Cycling.

From 2003, amongst others, he started working as consultant for the Danish Cycling Federation. Further clients of his company SL-sports included the UCI, Speed Skating Canada, Swiss Triathlon, Equipe Nürnberger Versicherung, SRM and the T-Mobile Cycling Team. For the latter, he directed the T-Mobile Development Programme, which included riders such as Mark Cavendish, Ed Clancy, Geraint Thomas, Ian Stannard and Stefan Denifl.

In 2005, he was appointed Denmark’s National Track Cycling Coach. Within years, he was elevating the Danish team pursuit squad from 10th place at the 2006 World Championships in Bordeaux to Olympic Silver at the Beijing Olympics, achieving in the semifinals 3:56.831, the 2nd fastest time in the world.

In late 2008, he returned to British Cycling as Performance Manager.

In 2012 he founded the Russian professional cycling team RusVelo.

In October 2014 Salzwedel rejoined British Cycling for a third spell with the federation, with responsibility for the men's endurance programme. In this role he coached Bradley Wiggins in his successful bid to break the world hour record in June 2015, and coached the team pursuit squad to a gold medal at the 2016 Summer Olympics. In October 2017 it was reported in the media that he had been sacked from his post: In January 2018 British Cycling confirmed that he had left his role.

== Personal life ==
Salzwedel was married, with two children. He died on 29 September 2021 in Berlin.
