= Enrico Degano =

Italian professional road bicycle racer

Personal information
- Full name: Enrico Degano
- Born: 11 March 1976 (age 50) Gorizia, Italy

Cycling career
- Sport: Cycling
- Discipline: Road
- Role: Rider
- Rider type: Sprinter

Professional teams
- 1999–2002: Ceramiche Panaria
- 2003: Mercatone Uno
- 2004–2009: Barloworld

Enrico Degano (born 11 March 1976 in Gorizia) is an Italian professional road bicycle racer who rode for UCI Professional Continental team Barloworld until the team's demise.

He was the first rider to start the prologue of the 2007 Tour de France, although had to abandon during stage 7 of the race due to a crash.

== Major results ==
1997
1st Stage 1 Tour of Croatia
1999
Tour de Langkawi

1st Stages 2 & 7

1st Stage 3 Tour de Slovénie
2000
1st Stage 3 Settimana Internazionale Coppi e Bartali
1st Stage 2 Grande Prémio Jornal de Notícias
2001
Tour de Langkawi

1st Stages 2 & 5

3rd GP Citta di Rio Saliceto e Correggio
10th Stausee Rundfahrt
2002
1st Stage 3 Tour de Langkawi
2003
1st Stage 9 Peace Race
1st Stage 5 Ster Elektrotoer
2004
1st Stage 5 Tour of Britain
1st Stage 3 Brixia Tour
8th Scheldeprijs
2005
Ster Elektrotoer

1st Points classification
1st Stages 1 & 5

2nd GP Stad Zottegem
3rd Overall GP Costa Azul
5th GP Costa degli Etruschi
5th GP Citta' di Misano Adriatico
2006
GP Costa Azul

1st Stages 2 & 4

1st Stage 2 Volta ao Alentejo
1st Stage 1 GP CTT Correios de Portugal
2nd GP Citta' di Misano Adriatico
4th Ronde van Drenthe
8th GP de Fourmies
2007
1st Stage 1 GP CTT Correios de Portugal
