= Paolo Lanfranchi =

Italian cyclist

Personal information
- Full name: Paolo Lanfranchi
- Born: 25 July 1968 (age 58) Gazzaniga, Italy

Cycling career
- Sport: Cycling
- Discipline: Road
- Role: Rider
- Rider type: All-rounder

Professional teams
- 1993–1994: Mercatone Uno–Zucchini–Medeghini
- 1995: Brescialat–Fago
- 1996: San Marco Group
- 1996–2001: Mapei–GB
- 2002: Index–Alexia Alluminio
- 2003–2004: Ceramiche Panaria–Fiordo

Major wins
- Tour de Langkawi (1999 & 2001)

Paolo Lanfranchi (born 25 July 1968 in Gazzaniga, Province of Bergamo) is an Italian former professional road bicycle racer. Originally from Gazzaniga, Italy. Lanfranchi was a dominating figure in the Italian road racing scene by winning many points standings. Turning pro in 1993, he captured his first major victory in winning a Yellow Jersey for General classification of the Tour de Langkawi in 1999 riding for the Mapei–Quick-Step team, and again in 2001 with the same team.

== Major results ==
1988
1st GP Capodarco
1990
1st Giro del Medio Brenta
1991
1st Gran Premio di Poggiana
1992
3rd Trofeo Città di San Vendemiano
1994
3rd Clásica Internacional de Alcobendas
1995
2nd Road race, National Road Championships
2nd Trofeo Matteotti
4th GP Città di Camaiore
1996
3rd GP Llodio
1997
2nd Giro di Lombardia
2nd Giro del Piemonte
3rd Milano–Torino
1998
2nd Giro dell'Appennino
1999
1st Overall Tour de Langkawi
1st Overall GP Internacional Telecom

1st Stage 1

4th GP Città di Camaiore
4th Tre Valli Varesine
2000
1st Stage 19 Giro d'Italia
3rd Giro dell'Appennino
3rd LuK Challenge
3rd Clasica de Sabiñanigo
2001
1st Overall Tour de Langkawi

1st Prologue, Stages 8 & 9

3rd GP Miguel Indurain
4th Giro dell'Emilia
6th Giro del Lazio
6th GP Industria & Commercio di Prato
9th Giro di Romagna
9th Overall Vuelta a Murcia
10th GP Industria & Artigianato di Larciano
2002
3rd GP Kanton Aargau Gippingen
8th Overall Tour de Langkawi
2003
5th Overall Tour Down Under
5th Overall Giro del Trentino
6th Coppa Sabatini
6th GP Industria & Commercio di Prato
8th Tre Valli Varesine
10th Overall Tour de Langkawi
2004
9th Coppa Agostoni

=== Grand Tour general classification results timeline ===
Grand Tour	1994	1995	1996	1997	1998	1999	2000	2001	2002	2003	2004
Giro d'Italia	—	15	15	DNF	18	—	12	41	41	20	61
Tour de France	DNF	14	59	—	—	18	—	—	—	—	—
Vuelta a España	13	—	—	18	DNF	—	38	—	—	—	—

Legend
—	Did not compete
DNF	Did not finish
