= David McKenzie (cyclist) =

Australian cyclist (born 1974)

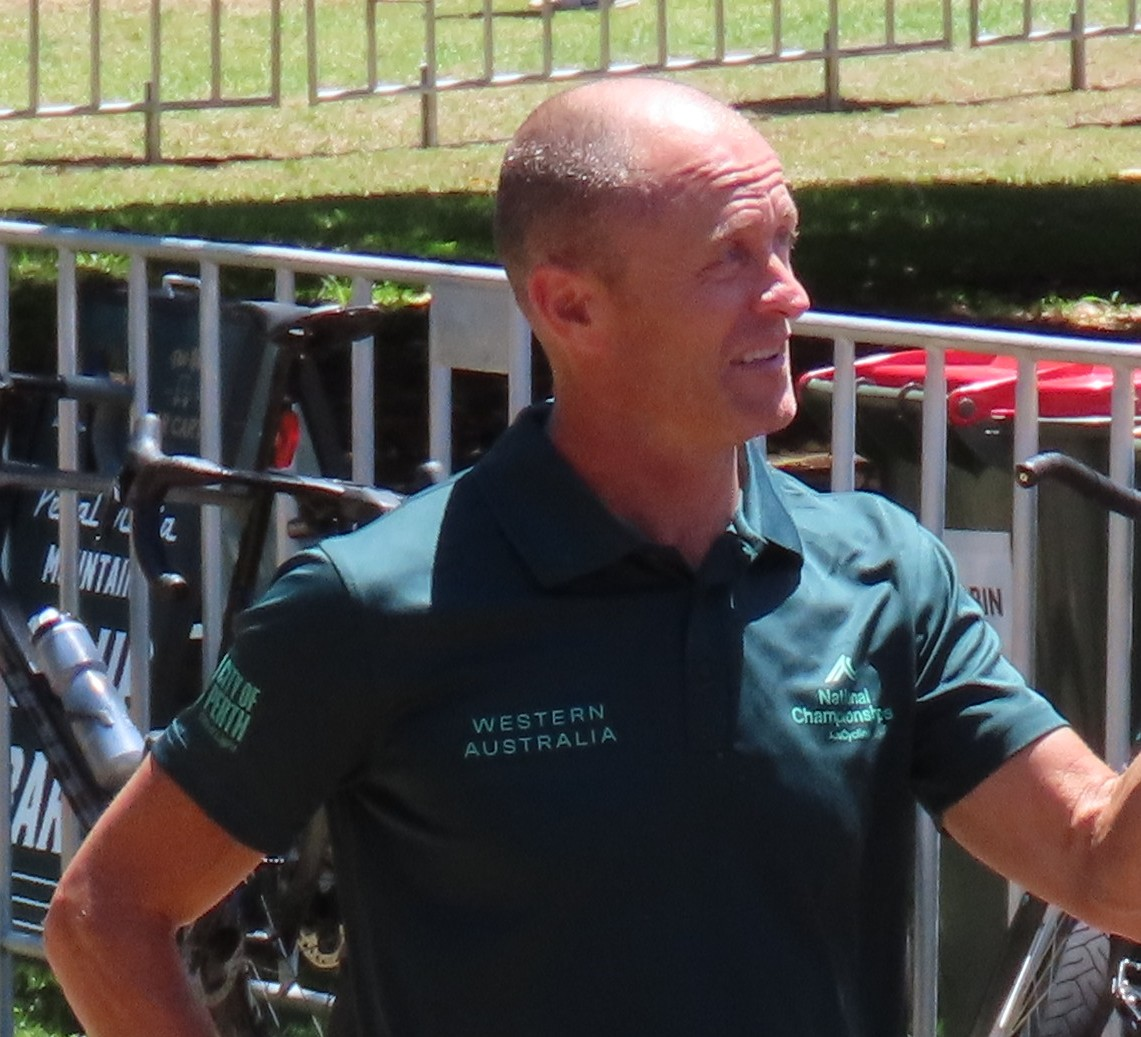
- McKenzie conducting an interview during the 2025 Australia National Road Cycling Championships

Personal information
- Full name: David McKenzie
- Born: 6 August 1974 (age 52) Ballarat, Australia

Cycling career
- Sport: Cycling
- Discipline: Road
- Role: Rider

Professional teams
- 1996: Giant–Australian Institute of Sport
- 1997–1998: Kross–Montanari–Selle Italia
- 1999–2001: Linda McCartney Racing Team
- 2001: Ficonseils–RCC Conseils
- 2002–2003: iTeamNova.com
- 2004: Navigators Insurance
- 2005: Wismilak International Team

Major wins
- Stage 7, Giro d'Italia (2000)

David McKenzie (born 6 August 1974) is an Australian former racing cyclist. He won the Australian national road race title in 1998. McKenzie's biggest victory came on stage 7 of the 2000 Giro d'Italia where he rode to victory after a 164 km solo breakaway. McKenzie won the Goulburn to Sydney Classic in 2005. He now works as a cycling journalist and commentator for Australian broadcaster SBS. He has been involved with the UCI Continental teams Black Spoke Pro Cycling Academy and EuroCyclingTrips - CMI Pro Cycling.

== Major results ==
1994
1st Stage 1 Olympia's Tour
1995
Herald Sun Tour

1st Stages 4 & 8

1996
Herald Sun Tour

1st Stages 6a & 8a

1997
1st Stage 14 Herald Sun Tour
1998
1st Road race, National Road Championships
Herald Sun Tour

1st Stages 3 & 8a

1999
1st Stage 3 Tour de Langkawi
2000
1st Stage 7 Giro d'Italia
1st Stage 8 Circuito Montañes
2001
1st Stage 4 Tour de Beauce
1st Stage 6 Tour Down Under
1st Stage 1 (ITT) Herald Sun Tour
2002
2nd Grand Prix de la ville de Pérenchies
4th Overall Herald Sun Tour

1st Stages 1 (ITT) & 6

2003
1st Stage 4 Tour of Qinghai Lake
1st Stage 3 Herald Sun Tour
2004
2nd Overall Herald Sun Tour
2nd Ronde van Drenthe
2005
4th Overall Herald Sun Tour
9th Overall Tour of Japan

1st Stage 2
