= Damian McDonald =

Australian cyclist (1972–2007)

Personal information
- Full name: Damian McDonald
- Born: 12 May 1972 Wangaratta, Victoria, Australia
- Died: 23 March 2007 (aged 34) Melbourne, Victoria, Australia

Cycling career
- Sport: Cycling
- Disciplines: Road & Track
- Role: Rider

Amateur team
- Blackburn Cycling Club

Professional teams
- 1996: Giant-AIS
- 1997: ZVVZ-Giant-AIS
Medal record
Men's road bicycle racing
Representing Australia
Commonwealth Games
Gold medal – first place	1994 Victoria	Team time trial

Damian McDonald (12 May 1972 – 23 March 2007) was an Australian road bicycle racer, who was born in Wangaratta. He was an Australian Institute of Sport scholarship holder. McDonald died on 23 March 2007. He was one of three men killed in a collision and explosion in the Burnley Tunnel in Melbourne, Victoria.

== Career ==
In 1990, McDonald won the Australian national road race title, beating Eddy Salas, who is also a successful road bicycle racer.

In 1992, he was a reserve for four-man pursuit team at the Barcelona Olympics, barely missing out on a medal when the team won silver, losing to Germany. In the same year McDonald was also inducted as a life member of the Blackburn Cycling Club. He won a gold medal at the 1994 Commonwealth Games as part of the road time trial team with Henk Vogels, Phil Anderson and Brett Dennis. He also won gold at the inaugural Malaysian Tour de Langkawi in 1996, and also represented Australia at the 1996 Summer Olympics in Atlanta.

== Family ==
He was married to Bree McDonald, the manager of the Melbourne Vixens netball side. They have a son.
