= Giant–Australian Institute of Sport =

Giant-AIS Cycling Team
Team information
- UCI code: GIA
- Registered: Australia
- Founded: 1996
- Disbanded: 1998
- Discipline: Road
- Bicycles: Giant

Key personnel
- General manager: Heiko Salzwedel
- Team manager: Jiri Zenisek

The Giant–Australian Institute of Sport Cycling Team (UCI team code: GIA) was an Australian professional cycling team sponsored by the Australian Institute of Sport (AIS) and bicycle manufacturer Giant. Heiko Salzwedel and Brian Stephens were early directeur sportifs. The fusion of the Giant-AIS and the Czech Husquarna team in 1997 extended its International profile, allowing to include foreign riders, such as Jens Voigt, Jan Hruška, Tomáš Konečný. Consequently, the name of the team was changed to ZVVZ-Giant-AIS Cycling Team.

== Sponsors ==
=== Australian Institute of Sport ===
The Australian Institute of Sport is the high-performance arm of the Government founded Australian Sports Commission. In 1990, the AIS extended their commitment to Cycling and started the AIS Road Cycling programme in Canberra under AIS Head Coach and Australian National Road Coach Heiko Salzwedel. Initially, 12 cyclists have been offered scholarships, amongst them Patrick Jonker, Grant Rice, Darren Smith, Robert McLachlan, Robert Crowe, Jamie Kelly, Matt Bazzano and Jason Phillips. In 1993, the AIS programme in Canberra was expanding to include the MTB and the Women's Endurance programme. Cadel Evans was in the first group of mountain bikers and Olympic Gold medalist Kathy Watt being the most prominent riders of the Women's Endurance programme. Damian Grundy (MTB) and Andrew Logan (Women's Endurance) have been appointed as AIS and National Coaches.

=== Giant ===
The Taiwanese bicycle manufacturer began its international sponsorship activities in 1991 with the Australian Institute of Sport Cycling Team. Riders, such as Robbie McEwen, Patrick Jonker, Henk Vogels, David McKenzie started their International cycling career at the Australian Institute of Sport on GIANT bikes. When the Trade Team was founded in 1996, it became prime co-sponsor of the team bearing its name along with the Australian Institute of Sport.

=== Jayco ===
As a consequence of their long standing relationship with Cycling teams and races in Australia, the American/Australian manufacturer of caravans and motorhomes, based in Melbourne, provided the team with custom made motorhomes both in USA and in Australia.

=== ZVVZ ===
The financial support of Czech manufacturer of Airconditioning equipment enabled the Australian team to contract International riders, such as Jens Voigt, Jan Hruška, Tomáš Konečný and others.

=== Škoda ===
As a part of the Volkswagen Group, the Czech car manufacturer Škoda started their extensive and long time commitment towards cycling in 1997, providing the team with six of their then brand new model Škoda Octavia.

== Team roster 1996 ==
Rider	Date of birth
Brett Dennis (AUS)	21 October 1971 (aged 24)
Paul Brosnan (AUS)	23 October 1973 (aged 22)
Nick Gates (AUS)	10 March 1972 (aged 23)
John Gregory (AUS)	7 October 1966 (aged 29)
Declan Lonergan (IRL)	25 July 1969 (aged 26)
Kelvin Martin (AUS)	27 July 1972 (aged 23)
Damian McDonald (AUS)	12 May 1972 (aged 23)
Rodney McGee (AUS)	11 March 1974 (aged 21)
Tony Morphett (AUS)	13 April 1973 (aged 22)
Tristan Priem (AUS)	19 February 1972 (aged 23)
Jay Sweet (AUS)	11 August 1972 (aged 23)
Matt White (AUS)	22 February 1974 (aged 21)

== Team roster 1997 ==
Rider	Date of birth
Brett Dennis (AUS)	21 October 1971 (aged 25)
Paul Brosnan (AUS)	23 October 1973 (aged 23)
Nick Gates (AUS)	10 March 1972 (aged 24)
Slavomir Heger (CZE)	3 March 1971 (aged 25)
Jan Hruška (CZE)	4 February 1975 (aged 21)
Miroslav Kejval (CZE)	11 July 1973 (aged 23)
Tomáš Konečný (CZE)	11 October 1973 (aged 23)
Damian McDonald (AUS)	12 May 1972 (aged 24)
Peter Rogers (AUS)	24 October 1974 (aged 22)
Paul Rowney (AUS)	2 December 1970 (aged 26)
Tomas Sedlacek (CZE)	17 March 1967 (aged 29)
Jay Sweet (AUS)	11 August 1972 (aged 24)
Jens Voigt (GER)	17 September 1971 (aged 25)
Matt White (AUS)	22 February 1974 (aged 22)
