= Mitsuteru Tanaka =

Japanese cyclist

Personal information
- Born: 27 September 1971 Gifu, Japan
- Died: 5 August 2018 (aged 46)

Cycling career
- Sport: Cycling

Professional team
- 2006: Aisan Racing Team

Mitsuteru Tanaka (田中 光輝, Tanaka Mitsuteru; 27 September 1971 – 5 August 2018) was a Japanese cyclist. He competed in the individual road race at the 1992 Summer Olympics. He was also Japanese national champion in 1992. During his career, he rode for Aisan Racing Team, and after retirement, served as both team manager and general manager of Aisan.
