= Connor Brown (cyclist) =

New Zealand cyclist (born 1998)

Personal information
- Born: 6 August 1998 (age 28) Cape Town, South Africa
- Height: 187 cm (6 ft 2 in)
- Weight: 74 kg (163 lb)

Cycling career
- Sport: Cycling
- Current team: Retired
- Discipline: Road
- Role: Rider

Professional teams
- 2018: Mobius–BridgeLane
- 2019–2020: Dimension Data for Qhubeka
- 2021: Team Qhubeka Assos
Medal record
Junior World Championships
Gold medal – first place	2016 Aiglé	Team Pursuit

Connor Brown (born 6 August 1998) is a New Zealand former professional racing cyclist, who competed as a professional from 2018 to 2021.

== Major results ==
2016
UCI Junior Track World Championships

1st Team pursuit

2019
3rd Overall Tour de Limpopo

1st Stage 2

3rd Trofeo Alcide Degasperi
2020
6th Overall New Zealand Cycle Classic

=== Grand Tour general classification results timeline ===
Grand Tour	2021
Giro d'Italia	—
Tour de France	—
Vuelta a España	130

Legend
—	Did not compete
DNF	Did not finish
