= Graeme Miller (cyclist) =

New Zealand cyclist (born 1960)

Personal information
- Full name: Graeme John Miller
- Born: 20 November 1960 (age 65) Blenheim, New Zealand

Cycling career
- Sport: Cycling
- Disciplines: Road and track
- Role: Rider

Professional teams
- 1994: Motorola
- 1995: Scott - BiKyle Flyers
- 2000: Shaklee
- 2002: Mercury Cycling Team
Medal record
Representing New Zealand
Commonwealth Games
Men's road bicycle racing
Gold medal – first place	1990 Auckland	Road race
Men's track cycling
Gold medal – first place	1990 Auckland	Team time trial
Silver medal – second place	1986 Edinburgh	Team time trial
Silver medal – second place	1982 Brisbane	Team pursuit

Graeme John Miller (born 20 November 1960) is a former New Zealand racing cyclist from Blenheim. He competed at three Olympic Games in 1984, 1988 and 1992. His best result was in 1988 in Seoul where he finished 8th in the men's road race.

He won two gold medals at the 1990 Commonwealth Games in the men's road race and in the men's team time trial. At the 1986 Commonwealth Games he won a silver medal in the men's team time trial, and four years earlier at the 1982 Commonwealth Games he won another silver in the team pursuit over 4000m.

He was the New Zealand team captain and opening ceremony flag bearer at the 1998 Commonwealth Games.

After more than 20 years as a New Zealand representative cyclist, at the age of 42 he retired from competitive cycling due to a back problem.

After four back operations and a two level fusion, Graeme was able to ride again after a six-year layoff.

He came out of retirement in Bermuda in 2008 after being asked to coach a start up team of amateur cyclists. He won several races after his return to cycling, including the Sinclair Packwood Memorial Road Race in May 2009.

== Major results ==
1987
1st Road race, National Road Championships
1988
8th Road race, Olympic Games
1993
1st Stage 4 Herald Sun Tour
3rd US Pro Championship
1995
1st Stage 11 Herald Sun Tour
1998
1st Stage 10b & 11 Herald Sun Tour
1999
1st Stage 6 Tour Down Under
1st Stage 4 Tour of Japan
2nd Road race, National Road Championships
2000
1st Stage 4 Tour of Japan
2001
1st Stage 2 Tour of Japan
6th First Union Classic
