= Nick Gates (cyclist) =

Australian cyclist (born 1972)

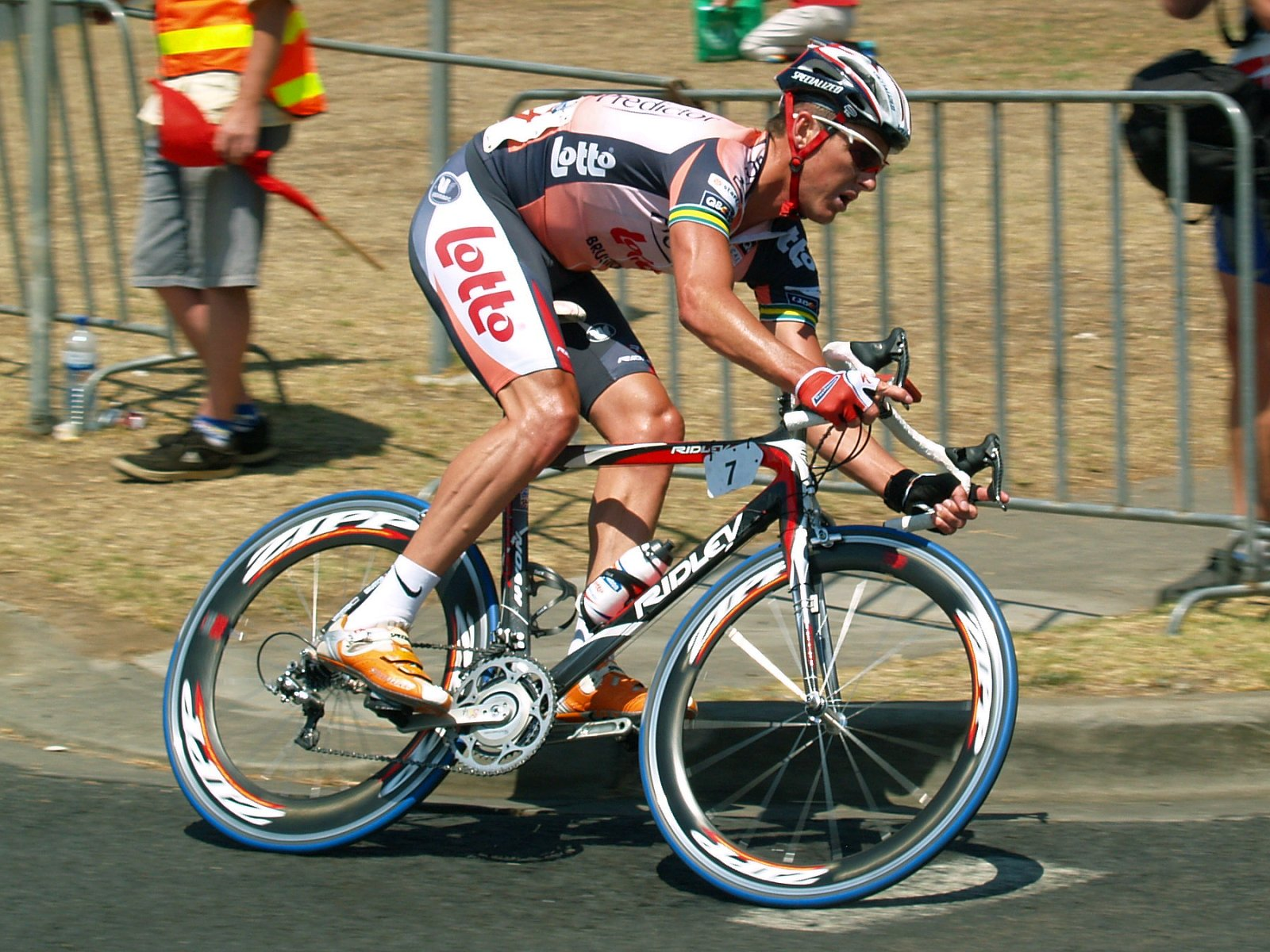
- Gates in 2007

Personal information
- Full name: Nick Gates
- Born: 10 March 1972 (age 54) Sydney, Australia
- Height: 1.83 m (6 ft 0 in)
- Weight: 71 kg (157 lb)

Cycling career
- Sport: Cycling
- Current team: Retired
- Discipline: Road
- Role: Domestique

Professional team
- 1996–1997: Giant–Australian Institute of Sport
- 1998–1999: Die Continentale–Olympia
- 2000: Team Hohenfelder–Concorde
- 2001: Agro–Adler–Brandenburg
- 2002: Team Wiesenhof
- 2003–2008: Lotto–Domo

Major wins
- Australian National Road Race Champion (1996); Commonwealth Bank Cycle Classic (1996)

Nick Gates (born 10 March 1972 in Sydney) is an Australian former professional road bicycle racer.

In 1996 Gates won the Commonwealth Bank Classic and the Australian national road race title.

Gates twice competed in the Tour de France, riding for the Lotto-Domo team, but failed to finish either event, pulling out after the 15th stage in 2003 and after the first stage in 2004.

His career ended with a fairytale victory in his self-named event, the Nick Gates Classic, in Townsville in 2008, where he won with the assistance of long-time teammate, Robbie McEwen.

== Major results ==
1996
1st Road race, National Road Championships
1st Overall Commonwealth Bank Classic
1997
1st Stage 1 Tour of Tasmania
1998
1st Stage 12 Commonwealth Bank Classic
1999
3rd Overall Tour of Japan

1st Stage 3

2000
1st Harsewinkel
2001
1st Gold Coast-Nerang
1st Neuss
2004
1st Burleigh
2006
1st Surfers Paradise
2007
1st Stage 1b (TTT) Settimana Ciclistica Internazionale Coppi-Bartali
2008
1st Nick Gates Classic

=== Tour de France results ===
- 2003 – DNF
- 2004 – DNF
