= Qhubeka =

South African non-profit organisation

Qhubeka Charity
- Formation: 2005
- Founder: Anthony Fitzhenry
- Location: South Africa
- Website: qhubeka.org

Qhubeka is a South African non-profit social mobility Charitable organization headquartered in Douglasdale, Johannesburg that donates bicycles to schoolchildren and key workers across South Africa and southern Africa. Qhubeka has donated nearly 110,000 of their unique bicycles to date, funded by several major global corporations, alongside personal donors worldwide. Qhubeka is currently a charity supported by the Tour de France since 2018 and has been supported by the Tour de France Femmes avec Zwift since 2022.

== History ==
The Qhubeka Charity was founded in 2005 by Anthony Fitzhenry. The name Qhubeka means "to move forward" in Nguni. Qhubeka provides bicycles for children to attend schools, and for adults to attend work, with estimates suggesting a 75% reduction in commuting time and 23% higher attendance at schools for people given a bicycle by the Qhubeka. In order to be given a bicycle, the recipients are first required to take bicycle safety and maintenance training courses. The organisation also donates one bicycle for every 100 trees grown, or for every ton of rubbish collected.

Since 2011, the Qhubeka Charity has been supported by Douglas Ryder's cycling team at various levels of elite professional cycling, helping to raise the profile of the charity worldwide. Qhubeka is also partnered with Absa Group Limited, Breitling, NTT and several others for either one-off donations/campaigns or long-term partnerships.

In November 2013, RCS Sport, the organisers of the Giro d'Italia, donated 58 bicycles to Qhubeka. In 2014, Qhubeka encouraged people to ride for 67 minutes and donate R67 on Mandela Day, and the Berg and Bush mountain bike race in KwaZulu-Natal chose Qhubeka as their charity to support. In 2015, the organisation donated 5,020 bicycles, and in June 2016, 100 bicycles were donated by Auto Trader.

On 2 August 2018, Qhubeka established a UK branch with Companies House to facilitate donations from the United Kingdom, as well gain access to Gift Aid. Following this, on 24 October 2019, Qhubeka had a branch confirmed by the Charity Commission for England and Wales. Since the UK branch was established, Qhubeka has established presence in the UK, and is now a charity partner of Cycling UK, and the high-profile BikeIsBest campaign.

Since 2018, the Qhubeka Charity has been a high-profile international charity partner of the Tour de France, with the race donating one Qhubeka bicycle per rider in the race (c.180) each year. This has now put over 500 children on bicycles across South Africa. From 2022, this partnership was also extended to the Tour de France Femmes avec Zwift race also, with over 50 bicycles funded in the debut year of this partnership.

In July 2019, the high-profile yellow-painted #maillotjaune Qhubeka bicycle was stolen at the Grand Départ in Brussels. This led to a multi-police agency hunt, supported by professional riders from all the World Tour teams present at the race. The campaign was covered across many media channels including Cycling Weekly. The bicycle was successfully recovered by an off-duty policeman. As part of their commitment to social mobility, The Tour de France agreed to provide one bicycle for every ride in the race.

In October 2019, Qhubeka announced they had distributed their 100,000 bicycle, with founder Anthony Fitzhenry quoted extensively.

On 8 May 2021, Assos of Switzerland, a long-term partner of the charity, announced the launch of a dedicated Qhubeka jersey with €60 going directly to the Qhubeka programme from the purchase of each jersey.

In December 2021, pro cyclist Victor Campenaerts announced a charity raffle of over 20 signed pro cycling jerseys, with all proceeds to Qhubeka. The auction raised over €20,000 for the charity. On 23 June 2022, ASO (the organisers of the Tour de France and Tour de France Femmes avec Zwift, announced a continuation of their partnership with Qhubeka.

Swiss Iron Man athlete Ronnie Schildknecht was at a triathlon training camp in Mallorca in 2019. While joking around he and two friends decided to shave moustaches over night and ride as “Les Moustaches” for the rest of the week. Being back in Switzerland 'Les Moustaches' initiated a charity ride in 2019 for Qhubeka, an organization which Ronnie cares about passionately. The aim is to grow a moustache, meet great people, have an easy ride and raise money for a good cause. The Moustaches Ride fifth edition took place on 13 August 2023 in Zurich.

Anthony Fitzhenry is currently leading a design and engineering project to create a new look Qhubeka bicycle for 2024. Several elements of the bicycle are being re-engineered and developed to improve longevity, reduce maintenance still further, and simplify all the tools needed to repair and replace parts.
