= Team Qhubeka NextHash =

South African cycling team

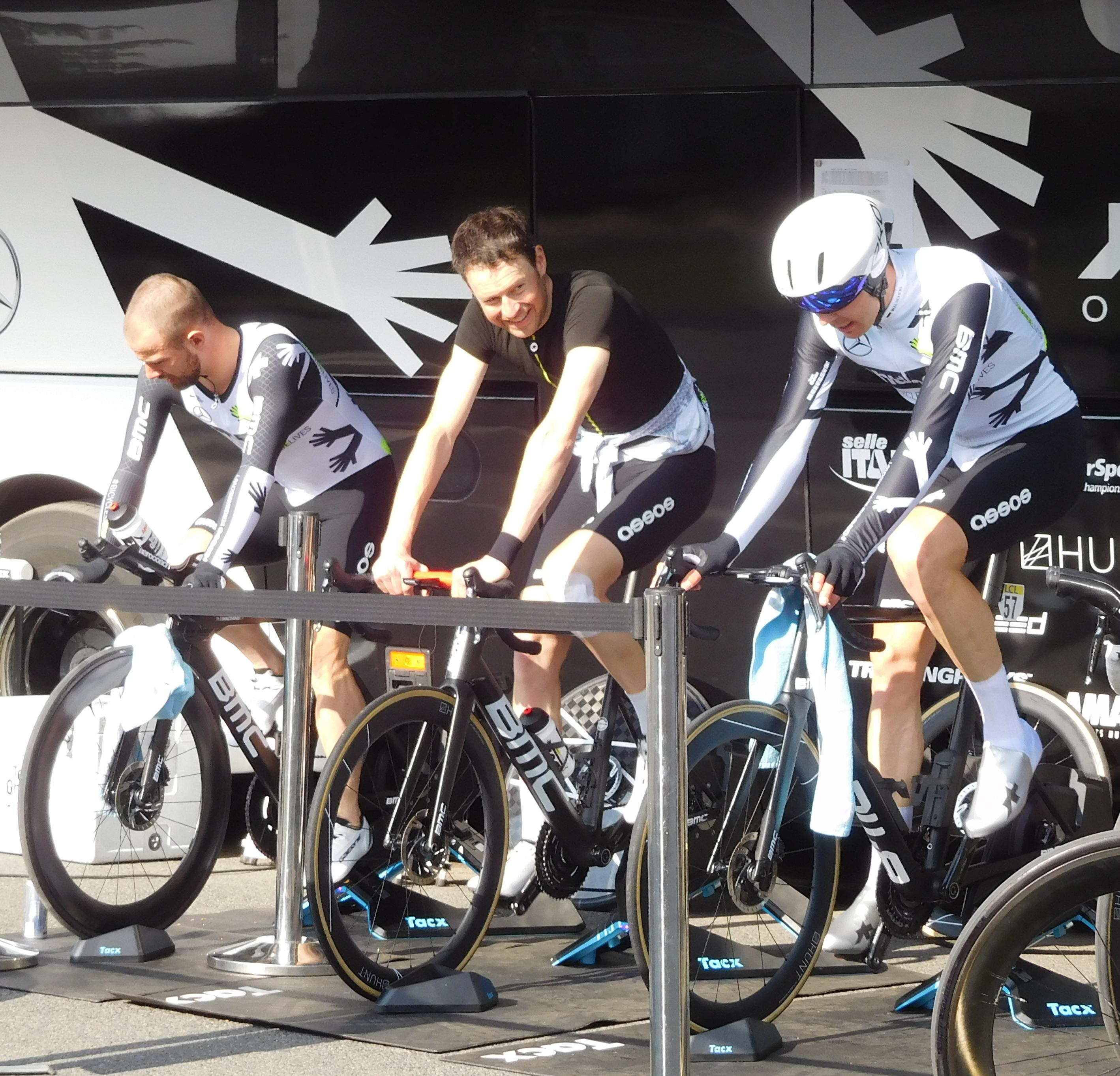
- Team Qhubeka Assos riders at the 2021 Paris–Nice

Team information
- UCI code: TQA
- Registered: South Africa
- Founded: 2007
- Disbanded: 2021
- Discipline: Road cycling
- Status: UCI Continental (2007–2012); UCI Professional Continental (2013–2015); UCI WorldTeam (2016–2021)
- Bicycles: Trek (2007–2014); Cervélo (2015–2018); BMC (2019–2021)
- Website: Team home page

Key personnel
- General manager: Douglas Ryder
- Team manager: Lars Michaelsen

Team name history
2007	MTN
2008	Team MTN
2009	MTN Cycling
2010	MTN–Energade
2011–2015	MTN–Qhubeka
2016–2019	Team Dimension Data for Qhubeka
2020	NTT Pro Cycling
2021	Team Qhubeka Assos
2021	Team Qhubeka NextHash
Team Qhubeka NextHash jersey
Jersey

Team Qhubeka (UCI team code: TQA) was a UCI WorldTeam based in South Africa. The team rode to raise awareness and funds for Qhubeka, a South African not-for-profit organisation. The team was founded in 2007 and was the first-ever African team to ride the Tour de France (2015).

== History ==
=== Foundation ===
The team was founded in 2007, becoming a Continental Team in 2008. The team remained as a UCI Continental Team until the end of the 2012 season, with the team registering its interest for a Professional Continental licence for 2013 under the name MTN-Qhubeka. In November 2012, the team were registered as a Professional Continental team – Africa's first – by the Union Cycliste Internationale, for the 2013 season.

The team achieved their first major win in 2013 when Gerald Ciolek won Milan-San Remo, one of the 5 Monuments of cycling. The team received their first Grand Tour wildcard for the 2014 Vuelta a España.

In July 2014, the team announced that for the 2015 season they would be using Cervélo bikes with Brian Smith being appointed interim general manager. In August 2014, the team confirmed the signing of Edvald Boasson Hagen on a 2-year contract. In September 2014 the team announced they had signed Tyler Farrar and Matthew Goss for the 2015 season.

=== First African Team in Tour de France ===
On 14 January 2015, the Amaury Sport Organisation (ASO) announced the 22 teams that would participate in the 2015 Tour de France, with MTN-Qhubeka making history as the first African registered team to take part. Steve Cummings brought the team their first stage win of the Tour, stage 14 on Mandela Day. The team's second Grand Tour stage victory came the following month at the 2015 Vuelta a España, where Kristian Sbaragli won a reduced bunch sprint on stage 10.

Daniel Teklehaimanot made history in the 2015 Tour de France when he spent four days in the race's polka-dot jersey, becoming not only the first Eritrean but the first African to wear that jersey. The success brought him to the attention of the wider cycling world.

=== Dimension Data as new sponsor ===
In July 2015, MTN announced they would end their sponsorship of the team. Two months later, Dimension Data was announced as the team's new primary sponsor. The new team name would be "Team Dimension Data for Qhubeka"; the change in name was intended to demonstrate that the team supported the Qhubeka bicycle charity rather than receiving sponsorship for them. The change came at the same time as rumours were circulating that Mark Cavendish and his lead-out man Mark Renshaw were about to sign with the team for the 2016 season. Days later the team announced Deloitte had agreed to become a major sponsor of the team; the very next day the signing of Cavendish and Renshaw – along with their former teammate Bernhard Eisel – was confirmed. In November 2015, the team announced that Rolf Aldag had been appointed as the team's Performance Manager with immediate effect, following Cavendish and Renshaw from Etixx–Quick-Step. Later that month Roger Hammond announced that he would join the team as a sports director for 2016, combining the role with his current position as manager of the Madison Genesis squad, and it was confirmed that the team had been granted a UCI World Tour licence for the 2016 season, becoming the first African team to enter cycling's top division.

=== Rebranding ===
In 2020 the team was rebranded as "Team NTT", named for the holding company of Dimension Data. On 8 January 2020, the team announced that 1996 Tour de France winner Bjarne Riis, who had previously worked with Tinkoff–Saxo., had acquired a third of the team's ownership and would serve as manager. On 11 November 2020, it was announced that Riis would leave NTT Pro Cycling. The team faced an uncertain future beyond 2020, as their main sponsor NTT confirmed to be leaving the team by the end of the year. On 20 November 2020, Douglas Ryder announced that, from 2021, the team will move forward as "Qhubeka ASSOS". The team was further rebranded ahead of the 2021 Tour de France, after a five-year naming rights agreement was signed with the NextHash Group, becoming Team Qhubeka NextHash.

However, despite finding a sponsor mid-season again, the team faced financial problems. In December 2021, the UCI announced that the team would not receive a UCI WorldTour license for 2022. The team then announced they would continue at the UCI Continental level with the development team (Team Qhubeka) and hoped to return to the WorldTour in the future.

== Team roster ==
As of 31 December 2021.

Rider	Date of birth
Sander Armée (BEL)	10 December 1985 (aged 36)
Fabio Aru (ITA)	3 July 1990 (aged 31)
Carlos Barbero (ESP)	29 April 1991 (aged 30)
Sean Bennett (USA)	31 March 1996 (aged 25)
Connor Brown (NZL)	6 August 1998 (aged 23)
Victor Campenaerts (BEL)	28 October 1991 (aged 30)
Dimitri Claeys (BEL)	18 June 1987 (age 39)
Simon Clarke (AUS)	18 July 1986 (aged 35)
Nicholas Dlamini (RSA)	12 August 1995 (aged 26)
Kilian Frankiny (SUI)	26 January 1994 (aged 27)
Michael Gogl (AUT)	4 November 1993 (aged 28)
Sergio Henao (COL)	10 December 1987 (aged 34)
Reinardt Janse van Rensburg (RSA)	3 February 1989 (aged 32)
Bert-Jan Lindeman (NED)	16 June 1989 (aged 32)

Rider	Date of birth
Giacomo Nizzolo (ITA)	30 January 1989 (aged 32)
Lasse Norman Hansen (DEN)	11 February 1992 (aged 29)
Matteo Pelucchi (ITA)	21 January 1989 (aged 32)
Robert Power (AUS)	11 May 1995 (aged 26)
Domenico Pozzovivo (ITA)	30 November 1982 (aged 39)
Mauro Schmid (SUI)	4 December 1999 (aged 22)
Andreas Stokbro (DEN)	8 April 1997 (aged 24)
Dylan Sunderland (AUS)	26 February 1996 (aged 25)
Harry Tanfield (GBR)	17 November 1994 (aged 27)
Karel Vacek (CZE)	9 September 2000 (aged 21)
Emil Vinjebo (DEN)	24 March 1994 (aged 27)
Max Walscheid (GER)	13 June 1993 (aged 28)
Łukasz Wiśniowski (POL)	7 December 1991 (aged 30)

== National champions ==
2010
South Africa Road Race Christoff Van Heerden
South Africa Time Trial Kevin Evans
Rwanda Road Race Adrien Niyonshuti
2011
South Africa Time Trial, Daryl Impey
Namibia Road Race, Lotto Petrus
Namibia Time Trial, Lotto Petrus
Rwanda Road Race, Adrien Niyonshuti
2012
South Africa Time Trial, Reinardt Janse van Rensburg
Rwanda Road Race Adrien Niyonshuti
Namibia Road Race, Lotto Petrus
Namibia Time Trial, Lotto Petrus
2013
South Africa Road Race, Jay Thomson
Lithuania Time Trial, Ignatas Konovalovas
South Africa U23 Road Race, Louis Meintjes
South Africa U23 Time Trial, Louis Meintjes
2014
South Africa Road Race, Louis Meintjes
South Africa U23 Road Race, Louis Meintjes
South Africa U23 Time Trial, Louis Meintjes
Ethiopia Road Race, Tsgabu Grmay
Ethiopia Time Trial, Tsgabu Grmay
2015
South Africa Road Race, Jacques Janse van Rensburg
Norway Time Trial, Edvald Boasson Hagen
Eritrea Time Trial, Daniel Teklehaimanot
Eritrea Road Race, Natnael Berhane
Norway Road Race, Edvald Boasson Hagen
Netherlands Track (Kilo), Theo Bos
Netherlands Track (Individual sprint), Theo Bos
2016
South Africa Road Race, Jaco Venter
World Track (Madison), Mark Cavendish
Belarus Time Trial, Kanstantsin Siutsou
Norway Time Trial, Edvald Boasson Hagen
Eritrea Time Trial, Daniel Teklehaimanot
Rwanda Time Trial, Adrien Niyonshuti
Eritrea Road Race, Daniel Teklehaimanot
Belarus Road Race, Kanstantsin Siutsou
Norway Road Race, Edvald Boasson Hagen
2017
South Africa Road Race, Reinardt Janse van Rensburg
Norway Time Trial, Edvald Boasson Hagen
British Time Trial, Steve Cummings
Eritrea Time Trial, Mekseb Debesay
Rwanda Time Trial, Adrien Niyonshuti
British Road Race, Steve Cummings
Algeria Road Race, Youcef Reguigui
2018
Norway Time Trial, Edvald Boasson Hagen
Eritrea Road Race, Merhawi Kudus
2019
Eritrea Time Trial, Amanuel Gebrezgabihier
Africa Continental Time Trial, Ryan Gibbons
2020
South Africa Road Race, Ryan Gibbons
Italian Road Race, Giacomo Nizzolo
European Road Race, Giacomo Nizzolo
