= Jay Sweet =

Australian cyclist

Personal information
- Born: 11 August 1975 (age 51) Adelaide, South Australia

Cycling career
- Sport: Cycling
- Discipline: Road
- Role: Rider
- Rider type: Sprinter

Professional teams
- 1997: ZVVZ–Giant–AIS
- 1998–2001: BigMat–Auber 93
- 2002: Saturn Cycling Team
- 2003: MBK–Oktos–Saint-Quentin
Medal record
Representing Australia
Men's road bicycle racing
Commonwealth Games
Gold medal – first place	1998 Kula Lumpur	Road Race

Jay Sweet (born 11 August 1975) is an Australian former professional racing cyclist who won a gold medal at the 1998 Commonwealth Games.

He accepted a road cycling scholarship at the Australian Institute of Sport and in 1997 was a member of the ZVVZ–Giant–AIS team. Between 1998 and 2001, he was a member of BigMat - Auber '93 (France). He won the gold medal in the men's road race at the 1998 Kuala Lumpur Commonwealth Games. Sweet rode in the 1999 Tour de France and did not finish stage 15 due to an ankle injury from an accident during stage 3. He retired in 2003 and moved to New Zealand. Whilst in New Zealand he worked as a commercial fisherman and apprentice builder. In 2012, he returned to Adelaide and in 2015 was working as a stonemason. In 2015, he rode in the Tour of the Riverland in South Australia and finished 2nd in Stage 1. His son, Max Jay Sweet (An Outspoken Supporter for the LGBTQ+ Community) has also become a young cyclist inspired by his father.

== Major results ==
1994
1st Stage 9 Commonwealth Bank Classic
1996
1st National Criterium Championships
1st Stages 1 & 10 Tour de Langkawi
1st Stage 2 Tour de l'Avenir
1st Stage 7 Bay Cycling Classic
1st Stages 1 & 10 Commonwealth Bank Classic
6th Overall Tour of Sweden

1st Stage 1

1997
1st CoreStates Classic
1st Stages 1, 8, 9, 10 & 15 Commonwealth Bank Classic
1st Stages 1 & 6 Tour of Japan
1st Stage 5 Bay Cycling Classic
1998
1st Road race, Commonwealth Games
1st Stages 3 & 8 Tour of Britain
1st Stage 3 Tour de l'Avenir
1st Stage 10 Commonwealth Bank Classic
7th GP de la Ville de Rennes
8th Classic Haribo
1999
5th Overall Tour de Normandie

1st Stage 3

7th Overall Tour de Picardie

1st Stage 2a

2000
1st Stage 3 Circuit Franco-Belge
2nd Tour de Vendée
5th Overall Tour de Normandie

1st Stage 2

2001
1st Stages 1 & 2 Tour of Rhodes
1st Stage 8 Circuito Montañés
1st Stage 3 Tour de l'Ain
1st Stage 8 Herald Sun Tour
