= Acceptcard Pro Cycling =

Road bicycle racing team

Team information
- UCI code: ACC
- Registered: Denmark
- Founded: 1998
- Disbanded: 1999
- Discipline: Road
- Status: Trade Team II

Key personnel
- General manager: Henrik Elmgreen
- Team managers: Brian Holm; Fritz Mogensen

Team name history
- 1998–1999: Acceptcard Pro Cycling

Acceptcard Pro Cycling, also known as Team Acceptcard, was a Danish professional road bicycle racing team in 1998 and 1999. The sponsor, AcceptCard, is a Danish credit card company.

It was considered Denmark's first professional cycling team, and was managed by Henrik Elmgreen and Brian Holm. The team disbanded after the 1999 season due to failing to acquire a new main sponsor after AcceptCard ended their sponsorship.

Brian Holm was on the team in 1998, and manager in 1999. Jakob Piil rode for the team both years.

The team had three victories in 1998 and ten in 1999.
