= Matt White (cyclist) =

Australian cyclist (born 1974)

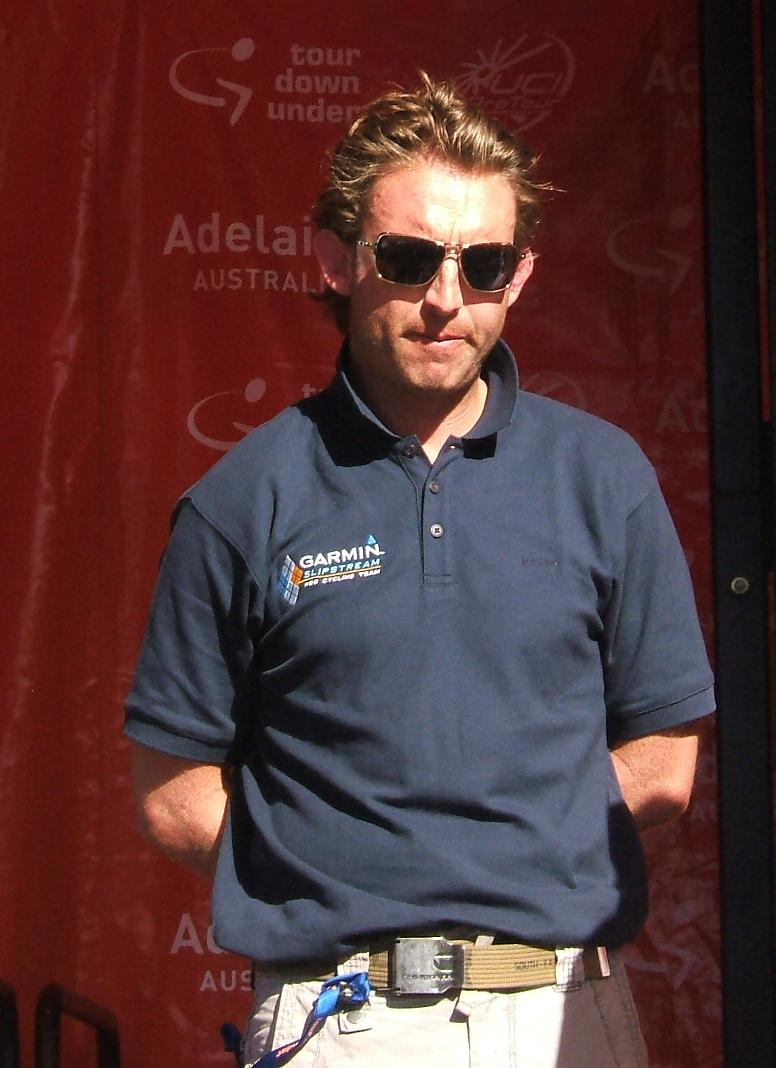

Personal information
- Full name: Matthew White
- Nickname: Whitey
- Born: 22 February 1974 (age 52) Sydney, Australia
- Height: 180 cm (5 ft 11 in)
- Weight: 79 kg (174 lb)

Cycling career
- Sport: Cycling
- Current team: Movistar

Professional teams
- 1996–1997: Giant-Australian Institute of Sport
- 1998: Amore & Vita–ForzArcore
- 1999–2000: Vini Caldirola
- 2001–2003: U.S. Postal Service
- 2004–2005: Cofidis
- 2006–2007: Discovery Channel

Managerial teams
- 2008-2010: Slipstream–Chipotle
- 2012-2025: Orica–Scott

Matthew White (born 22 February 1974) is an Australian former professional road racing cyclist. Most recently White worked as a sporting director for Team Jayco–AlUla, leaving the team unexpectedly just before the 2025 Giro d'Italia. White also worked as a sporting director for Garmin–Cervélo but was let go because of doping offenses during his racing career. His most notable results are winning a stage of the 1999 Tour de Suisse and another stage victory at the 2005 Tour Down Under. He mainly worked as a domestique throughout his career, sacrificing personal ambitions to help his leader.

== Biography ==
White started competitive cycling at age 14. Like so many other Australian professional riders he started his career on the track under Charlie Walsh, competing in the Junior World Championship in Athens. In 1994, he attended the Commonwealth Games in Victoria Canada, his fourth spot in the Team Time Trial was taken by soon to be retired Phil Anderson but he did compete in & finish the road race. Turning professional in 1996 at age 22 with the Giant-Australian Institute of Sport team under the GIANT-A.I.S. Sports Director and Australian National Coach, German born Heiko Salzwedel. During this period the team's European headquarters were in Cottbus, Germany.

After 2 years with the Australian GIANT-AIS Cycling Team, White then went through Italian teams Amore & Vita–ForzArcore (1998) and Vini Caldirola (1999) before finding himself on the US Postal Service team from 2001 through to 2003. In this period White was not selected to ride the Tour de France with Lance Armstrong but did ride the 2003 Vuelta a España in support of Roberto Heras. In 2004, Matthew moved to the French Cofidis team to join fellow Australian Stuart O'Grady.

He was selected in the Cofidis team to ride the 2004 Tour de France, but did not make the start line after falling and breaking his collar bone just hours prior to the start while warming up. Much to his relief he was selected again in 2005 and made it to the start. In 2005, he won stage 4 at the Tour Down Under, besting fellow Aussie Robbie McEwen to the sprint after their escape group of six riders succeeded.

White also coached his wife, Jane Saville, to a bronze medal at the 2004 Athens Olympics in the 20 km race walk. The couple split their time between Sydney and Oliva, Spain.

In 2012, as head of Australia's cycling team, Orica-GreenEDGE, Matt White admitted that during his competitive career he used performance-enhancing drugs while on the U.S. Postal Service squad, where doping formed part of the team's strategy and said "I too was involved in that strategy". He stood down from his role with Orica-GreenEDGE on 13 October 2012. On 17 October 2012 Matt White was sacked as a national coach by Cycling Australia due to his use of performance-enhancing drugs. Despite his involvement in doping Orica-GreenEDGE announced on 11 June 2013 that it was reinstating Matt White as their sports director.

== Major results ==
1992
3rd Team pursuit, UCI World Junior Track Championships
1996
1st Stage 1 (TTT) Tour of Wellington
2nd Overall Tour de Beauce
3rd Overall Tour of Wellington
1997
2nd Overall Giro del Capo
2nd Hennesee Rundfahrt
1998
1st Joseph Sunde Memorial
1999
1st Stage 6 Tour de Suisse
2002
1st Stage 1 (TTT) Volta a Catalunya
1st Noosa International Criterium
1st 1st South Bank GP
2005
1st Stage 4 Tour Down Under
2007
1st Cronulla International Grand Prix
