= Linda McCartney Racing Team =

Team information
- UCI code: LIN
- Registered: United Kingdom
- Founded: 1998
- Disbanded: 2001
- Discipline: Road
- Status: Inactive

Key personnel
- General manager: Julian Clark

Team name history
Linda McCartney Racing Team jersey
Jersey

The Linda McCartney Racing Team was a British professional road bicycle racing team.

== History ==
The team began in 1998 with Linda McCartney Foods, maker of vegetarian food, sponsoring vegetarian riders and staff. The company was started by Sir Paul McCartney's wife, Linda. Team success would promote vegetarianism and Linda McCartney Foods.

The team was to compete in Britain before expanding to international events. It was initially composed of British riders with more experienced riders joining later to improve credentials for the UCI World Cup and the Grand Tours.

It was the first British team to ride the Giro d'Italia but the increase in cost as the team and its commitments grew — Linda McCartney Foods did not continue sponsorship — led the team to disband in 2001 with reported debts of more than US$1m and a dispute with the UCI over riders' wages.

In 2012, a British investigation was launched into the former team, with allegations that the management did not organise doping, but knew several riders used performance-enhancing drugs and turned a blind eye.

== Notable riders ==
- Íñigo Cuesta
- Matt DeCanio
- David McKenzie
- Ciarán Power
- Pascal Richard
- Max Sciandri
- Matt Stephens
- Charly Wegelius
- Bradley Wiggins
