= Douglas Ryder =

South African cyclist

Personal information
- Full name: Douglas Ryder
- Born: 26 November 1971 (age 54) Cape Town, South Africa

Cycling career
- Sport: Cycling
- Current team: Retired (rider); Pinarello–Q36.5 Pro Cycling Team
- Role: Rider; Manager

Professional teams
- 1995–1996: Plymouth–Chrysler
- 2001: Team IBM–Lotus Development

Managerial teams
- 2007–2021: MTN
- 2023–: Q36.5 Pro Cycling Team
Medal record
Men's road cycling
Representing South Africa
CAC Road African Championships
Silver medal – second place	2001	Road Race

Douglas Ryder (born 26 November 1971) is a South African former cyclist, who works as the general manager UCI ProTeam Q36.5 Pro Cycling Team. He previously worked for UCI WorldTeam Team Qhubeka NextHash before the team disbanded in 2021. He competed in the men's individual road race at the 1996 Summer Olympics.

Ryder is a Laureus Sport for Good ambassador, further demonstrating his commitment to using sport for positive societal impact.

Doug Ryder has integrated Environmental, Social, and Governance (ESG) principles into his work with the Q36.5 Pro Cycling Team, focusing on data-driven approaches to become carbon neutral and measure sustainability efforts. His team's previous iteration, Team Qhubeka, also exemplified social responsibility by distributing over 100,000 bicycles to communities in Africa.

Ryder is a proponent of the belief that sports can effect meaningful change and a vision of purpose-driven organizations, which aligns with ESG goals.

== Major results ==
1995
5th Overall Tour de Langkawi
2001
2nd Road race, African Road Championships
