= 2002 Tour de Langkawi =

Race details
- Dates: 1–10 February 2002
- Stages: 10
- Distance: 1,312.6 km (815.6 mi)
- Winning time: 30h 03' 31"

Results
Jersey awarded to the overall winner	Winner	Hernán Darío Muñoz (COL)	(Colombia–Selle Italia)
	Second	Robert Hunter (RSA)	(Mapei–Quick-Step)
	Third	David George (RSA)	(South Africa)
Jersey awarded to the points classification winner	Points	Robert Hunter (RSA)	(Mapei–Quick-Step)
Jersey awarded to the mountains classification winner	Mountains	Ruber Marín (COL)	(Colombia–Selle Italia)
	Team	Mapei–Quick-Step	

The 2002 Tour de Langkawi was the 7th edition of the Tour de Langkawi, a cycling stage race that took place in Malaysia. It started on 1 February in Putrajaya and ended on 10 February in Kuala Lumpur. In fact, this race was rated by the Union Cycliste Internationale (UCI) as a 2.3 category race.

Hernán Darío Muñoz of Colombia won the race. Robert Hunter of South Africa won the point classification and Ruber Marín of Colombia won the mountains classification. Mapei–Quick-Step won the team classification.

== Stages ==
The cyclists competed in 10 stages, covering a distance of 1,312.6 kilometres.

Stage	Date	Course	Distance	Stage result		
Stage	Date	Course	Distance	Winner	Second	Third
1	1 February	Putrajaya Individual time trial	20.3 km (12.6 mi)	Robert Hunter (RSA)	Nathan O'Neill (AUS)	Eric Wohlberg (CAN)
2	2 February	Klang to Sitiawan	183.5 km (114.0 mi)	Robert Hunter (RSA)	Antonio Salomone (ITA)	Andrea Tafi (ITA)
3	3 February	Lumut to Ipoh	129.6 km (80.5 mi)	Enrico Degano (ITA)	Graeme Brown (AUS)	Mario Traversoni (ITA)
4	4 February	Tapah to Bentong	176.4 km (109.6 mi)	Moreno Di Biase (ITA)	Robert Hunter (RSA)	Frédéric Amorison (BEL)
5	5 February	Bangi to Malacca	129.7 km (80.6 mi)	Robert Hunter (RSA)	Antonio Salomone (ITA)	Wong Kam-po (HKG)
6	6 February	Muar to Johor Bahru	172 km (106.9 mi)	Graeme Brown (AUS)	Robert Hunter (RSA)	Hendrik Van Dyck (BEL)
7	7 February	Kluang to Tampin	196.7 km (122.2 mi)	Moreno Di Biase (ITA)	Daniele Galli (ITA)	Robert Hunter (RSA)
8	8 February	Port Dickson to Petaling Jaya	95.5 km (59.3 mi)	Antonio Salomone (ITA)	Andris Naudužs (LAT)	Dirk Schumann (GER)
9	9 February	Menara Telekom to Genting Highlands	133.3 km (82.8 mi)	Hernán Darío Muñoz (COL)	David George (RSA)	Ruber Marín (COL)
10	10 February	Kuala Lumpur Criterium	75.6 km (47.0 mi)	Graeme Brown (AUS)	Daniele Galli (ITA)	Robert Hunter (RSA)

== Classification leadership ==
Stage	Stage winner	General classification	Points classification	Mountains classification	Asian rider classification	Team classification	Asian team classification
1	Robert Hunter	Robert Hunter	Robert Hunter	not available	Arnel Quirimit	Mapei–Quick-Step	Japan
2	Robert Hunter	Robert Hunter	Robert Hunter	not available	Arnel Quirimit	Mapei–Quick-Step	Japan
3	Enrico Degano	Robert Hunter	Robert Hunter	Hans De Meester	Arnel Quirimit	Mapei–Quick-Step	Japan
4	Moreno Di Biase	Robert Hunter	Robert Hunter	Koji Fukushima	Ghader Mizbani	Mapei–Quick-Step	Telekom Malaysia
5	Robert Hunter	Robert Hunter	Robert Hunter	Koji Fukushima	Tonton Susanto	Mapei–Quick-Step	Telekom Malaysia
6	Graeme Brown	Robert Hunter	Robert Hunter	Koji Fukushima	Tonton Susanto	Mapei–Quick-Step	Telekom Malaysia
7	Moreno Di Biase	Robert Hunter	Robert Hunter	Koji Fukushima	Tonton Susanto	Mapei–Quick-Step	Telekom Malaysia
8	Antonio Salomone	Robert Hunter	Robert Hunter	Koji Fukushima	Tonton Susanto	Mapei–Quick-Step	Telekom Malaysia
9	Hernán Darío Muñoz	Hernán Darío Muñoz	Robert Hunter	Ruber Marín	Tonton Susanto	Mapei–Quick-Step	Telekom Malaysia
10	Graeme Brown	Hernán Darío Muñoz	Robert Hunter	Ruber Marín	Tonton Susanto	Mapei–Quick-Step	Telekom Malaysia
Final		Hernán Darío Muñoz	Robert Hunter	Ruber Marín	Tonton Susanto	Mapei–Quick-Step	Telekom Malaysia

== Final standings ==
=== General classification ===
	Rider	Team	Time
1	Hernán Darío Muñoz (COL)	Colombia–Selle Italia	30h 03' 31"
2	Robert Hunter (RSA)	Mapei–Quick-Step	+ 36"
3	David George (RSA)	South Africa	+ 01' 52"
4	René Jørgensen (DEN)	Team Fakta	+ 03' 50"
5	Mickaël Pichon (FRA)	Bonjour	+ 04' 42"
6	David Cañada (ESP)	Mapei–Quick-Step	+ 05' 00"
7	Artour Babaitsev (RUS)	Nürnberger	+ 05' 29"
8	Paolo Lanfranchi (ITA)	Index–Alexia Alluminio	+ 05' 56"
9	Ruber Marín (COL)	Colombia–Selle Italia	+ 06' 43"
10	Stive Vermaut (BEL)	Lotto–Adecco	+ 07' 11"

=== Points classification ===
	Rider	Team	Points
1	Robert Hunter (RSA)	Mapei–Quick-Step	121
2	Lubor Tesar (CZE)	Nürnberger	72
3	Graeme Brown (AUS)	Ceramiche Panaria–Fiordo	71
3	Moreno Di Biase (ITA)	Mobilvetta Design–Formaggi Trentini	71
5	Andrea Tafi (ITA)	Mapei–Quick-Step	67
6	Allan Bo Andresen (DEN)	Team Fakta	53
7	David Fernández Domingo (ESP)	Colchon Relax–Fuenlabrada	52
8	Antonio Salomone (ITA)	Index–Alexia Alluminio	49
9	Enrico Degano (ITA)	Ceramiche Panaria–Fiordo	42
10	Daniele Galli (ITA)	Index–Alexia Alluminio	40

=== Mountains classification ===
	Rider	Team	Points
1	Ruber Marín (COL)	Colombia–Selle Italia	30
2	Hernán Darío Muñoz (COL)	Colombia–Selle Italia	29
3	David George (RSA)	South Africa	29
4	Koji Fukushima (JPN)	Japan	15
5	Hans De Meester (BEL)	Palmans–Collstrop	12
5	Wong Kam-po (HKG)	Telekom Malaysia	12
5	Christophe Le Mével (FRA)	Crédit Agricole	12
5	René Jørgensen (DEN)	Team Fakta	12
9	Antoni Rizzi (ITA)	Mobilvetta Design–Formaggi Trentini	10
10	Dominique Perras (CAN)	iTeamNova.com	8
10	Robert Hunter (RSA)	Mapei–Quick-Step	8

=== Asian rider classification ===
	Rider	Team	Time
1	Tonton Susanto (INA)	Telekom Malaysia	30h 13' 40"
2	Shinichi Fukushima (JPN)	Japan	+ 06' 26"
3	Wong Kam-po (HKG)	Telekom Malaysia	+ 13' 10"
4	Ghader Mizbani (IRI)	Telekom Malaysia	+ 18' 07"
5	Tomoya Kano (JPN)	Japan	+ 22' 46"
6	Tsen Seong Hoong (MAS)	Malaysia	+ 27' 26"
7	Victor Espiritu (PHI)	Philippines	+ 28' 34"
8	Merculio Ramos (PHI)	Philippines	+ 29' 32"
9	Nor Affendy Rosli (MAS)	Telekom Malaysia	+ 31' 20"
10	Mohamad Fauzi Shafihi (MAS)	Telekom Malaysia	+ 32' 44"

=== Team classification ===
	Team	Time
1	Mapei–Quick-Step	90h 21' 04"
2	South Africa	+ 11' 11"
3	Colombia–Selle Italia	+ 11' 41"
4	Index–Alexia Alluminio	+ 21' 54"
5	Bonjour	+ 27' 32"
6	Acqua & Sapone–Cantina Tollo	+ 34' 55"
7	Telekom Malaysia	+ 36' 26"
8	Team Fakta	+ 52' 25"
9	Lotto–Adecco	+ 58' 25"
10	Crédit Agricole	+ 59' 26"

=== Asian team classification ===
	Team	Time
1	Telekom Malaysia	91h 01' 55"
2	Japan	+ 37' 01"
3	Philippines	+ 1h 01' 36"
4	Malaysia	+ 1h 12' 40"
5	China	+ 1h 57' 34"

== List of teams and riders ==
A total of 22 teams were invited to participate in the 2002 Tour de Langkawi. Out of the 151 riders, a total of 128 riders made it to the finish in Kuala Lumpur.

Index–Alexia Alluminio

- (Italy) Paolo Lanfranchi
- (Italy) Marco Battiston
- (Italy) Alberto Elli
- (Italy) Daniele Galli
- (Italy) Antonio Salomone
- (Italy) Eddy Serri
- (Latvia) Andris Reiss

Mapei–Quick-Step

- (Italy) Andrea Tafi
- (Italy) Davide Bramati
- (Italy) Paolo Fornaciari
- (South Africa) Robert Hunter
- (United Kingdom) Charly Wegelius
- (Italy) Luca Scinto
- (Spain) David Cañada

Crédit Agricole

- (Germany) Jens Voigt
- (France) Yohann Charpenteau
- (France) Christophe Le Mével
- (France) Ludovic Martin
- (France) Benoît Poilvet
- (France) Yan Tournier

Acqua & Sapone–Cantina Tollo

- (Ukraine) Kyrylo Pospyeyev
- (Italy) Michele Scarponi
- (Spain) Rubén Lobato
- (Spain) Agustin Pena Gago
- (Italy) Cesare Di Cintio
- (Italy) Lorenzo Cardellini

AG2R Prévoyance

- (Lithuania) Linas Balčiūnas
- (France) Laurent Estadieu
- (France) Andy Flickinger
- (France) Alexandre Grux
- (France) Nicolas Inaudi
- (Estonia) Innar Mändoja
- (France) Nicolas Portal

Ceramiche Panaria–Fiordo

- (Australia) Nathan O'Neill
- (Italy) Nicola Chesini
- (Italy) Enrico Degano
- (Italy) Stefano Guerrini
- (Ukraine) Sergiy Matveyev
- (Australia) Graeme Brown
- (Italy) Cristiano Parrinello

Lotto–Adecco

- (Belgium) Mario Aerts
- (Belgium) Frédéric Amorison
- (Belgium) Kurt van Lancker
- (Belgium) Kevin van Impe
- (Netherlands) Fulco van Gulik
- (Belgium) Stive Vermaut
- (Belgium) Wesley van Speybroeck

Telekom Malaysia

- (New Zealand) Graeme Miller
- (Hong Kong) Wong Kam-po
- (Iran) Ghader Mizbani
- (Iran) Ahad Kazemi
- (Indonesia) Tonton Susanto
- (Malaysia) Mohamad Fauzi Shafihi
- (Malaysia) Nor Affendy Rosli

Palmans–Collstrop

- (Luxembourg) Max Becker
- (Belgium) Tony Bracke
- (Belgium) Eric De Clercq
- (Belgium) Hans De Meester
- (Belgium) Björn Leukemans
- (Belgium) Karl Pauwels
- (Belgium) Hendrik Van Dyck

Mobilvetta Design–Formaggi Trentini

- (Italy) Mario Traversoni
- (Italy) Moreno Di Biase
- (Italy) Alessandro Brendolin
- (Italy) Samuel Vecchi
- (Italy) Antoni Rizzi
- (Slovenia) Uros Murn
- (Russia) Denis Bondarenko

Colchon Relax–Fuenlabrada

- (Spain) Jorge Capitan Peregrina
- (Spain) David Fernández Domingo
- (Spain) César Garcia Calvo
- (Spain) Oscar Laguna Garcia
- (Spain) German Nieto Fernandez
- (Spain) David Vazquez Garcia
- (Spain) José Manuel Vázquez Palomo

Team Fakta

- (Denmark) Lennie Kristensen
- (Denmark) Morten Sonne
- (Norway) Bjørnar Vestøl
- (Denmark) René Jørgensen
- (Denmark) Jorgen Bo Petersen
- (Denmark) Lars Bak
- (Denmark) Allan Bo Andresen

Bonjour

- (France) Anthony Charteau
- (France) Anthony Geslin
- (France) Charles Guilbert
- (France) Jimmy Engoulvent
- (France) Mickaël Pichon
- (France) Jérôme Pineau
- (France) Thomas Voeckler

Malaysia

- (Malaysia) Shahrulneeza Razali
- (Malaysia) Tsen Seong Hoong
- (Malaysia) Mohd Yusof Abd. Nasir
- (Malaysia) Muhd. Jasmin Ruslan
- (Malaysia) Shahrizan Selamat
- (Malaysia) Wong Ah Thiam
- (Malaysia) Suhardi Hassan

Colombia–Selle Italia

- (Colombia) Hernán Darío Muñoz
- (Colombia) Juan Diego Ramírez
- (Italy) Fortunato Baliani
- (Latvia) Andris Naudužs
- (Italy) Leonardo Scarselli
- (Ukraine) Mikhaylo Khalilov
- (Colombia) Ruber Marín

Nürnberger

- (Russia) Artour Babaitsev
- (Germany) Ronny Lauke
- (Austria) Jürgen Pauritsch
- (Germany) Dirk Schumann
- (Germany) Holger Sievers
- (Czech Republic) Lubor Tesar
- (Germany) Jurgen Werner

iTeamNova.com

- (Australia) Jamie Drew
- (United Kingdom) Russell Downing
- (New Zealand) Scott Guyton
- (Canada) Dominique Perras
- (Australia) Brett Lancaster
- (Australia) Trent Wilson
- (Australia) Allan Iacuone

South Africa

- (South Africa) Douglas Ryder
- (South Africa) David George
- (South Africa) Rodney Green
- (South Africa) Daniel Spence
- (South Africa) Jacques Fullard
- (South Africa) James Ball
- (South Africa) Jeremy Maartens

Philippines

- (Philippines) Victor Espiritu
- (Philippines) Warren Davadilla
- (Philippines) Arnel Quirimit
- (Philippines) Enrique Domingo
- (Philippines) Merculio Ramos
- (Philippines) Villamor Baluyut
- (Philippines) Emilito Atilano

Japan

- (Japan) Makoto Iijima
- (Japan) Koji Fukushima
- (Japan) Shinichi Fukushima
- (Japan) Tomoya Kano
- (Japan) Mitsuteru Tanaka
- (Japan) Kazuya Okazaki
- (Japan) Shinri Suzuki

Canada

- (Canada) Glan Rendall
- (Canada) Mark Ernsting
- (Canada) Andrew Pinfold
- (Canada) Geoff Kabush
- (Canada) Josh Hall
- (Canada) Eric Wohlberg
- (Canada) Ryder Hesjedal

China

- (China) Hui Guo
- (China) Wang Guozhang
- (China) Song Shuhai
- (China) Li Hongwei
- (China) Zhu Yongbiao
- (China) Jiang Xueli
