= 2003 Tour de Langkawi =

Race details
- Dates: 31 January–9 February 2003
- Stages: 10
- Distance: 1,343.5 km (834.8 mi)
- Winning time: 31h 54' 09"

Results
Jersey awarded to the overall winner	Winner	Tom Danielson (USA)	(Saturn)
	Second	Hernán Darío Muñoz (COL)	(Colombia–Selle Italia)
	Third	Fredy González (COL)	(Colombia–Selle Italia)
Jersey awarded to the points classification winner	Points	Graeme Brown (AUS)	(Ceramiche Panaria–Fiordo)
Jersey awarded to the mountains classification winner	Mountains	Roland Green (CAN)	(Canada)
	Team	Colombia–Selle Italia	

The 2003 Tour de Langkawi was the 8th edition of the Tour de Langkawi, a cycling stage race that took place in Malaysia. It began on January 31st in Langkawi and ended on February 9th in Kuala Lumpur. In fact, this race was rated by the Union Cycliste Internationale (UCI) as a 2.2 category race.

Tom Danielson of USA won the race, followed by Hernán Darío Muñoz of Colombia second and Fredy González of Colombia third. Graeme Brown of Australia won the points classification category and Roland Green of South Africa won the mountains classification category. Colombia–Selle Italia won the team classification category.

== Stages ==
The cyclists competed in 10 stages, covering a distance of 1,343.5 kilometres. Due to the extreme weather conditions(heavy downpour) experienced during the Stage 10 of the 2003 Tour de Langkawi, the stage was neutralised according to the decision of the College of Commissaires and the Race Organizer. All competitors at the stage had been awarded the winner's time. However, the classification and the top three finalist of the stage had been awarded.

Stage	Date	Course	Distance	Stage result		
Stage	Date	Course	Distance	Winner	Second	Third
1	January 31	Langkawi Individual time trial	9.5 km (5.9 mi)	Nathan O'Neill (AUS)	Roland Green (CAN)	Tom Danielson (USA)
2	February 1	Kangar to Butterworth	148.3 km (92.1 mi)	Luciano Pagliarini (BRA)	Graeme Brown (AUS)	Mikhaylo Khalilov (UKR)
3	February 2	Kulim to Ipoh	169.6 km (105.4 mi)	Luciano Pagliarini (BRA)	Moreno Di Biase (ITA)	Graeme Brown (AUS)
4	February 3	Gerik to Tanah Merah	172.9 km (107.4 mi)	Luciano Pagliarini (BRA)	Graeme Brown (AUS)	Stuart O'Grady (AUS)
5	February 4	Kota Bharu to Kuala Terengganu	179.1 km (111.3 mi)	Graeme Brown (AUS)	Guillermo Bongiorno (ARG)	Simone Cadamuro (ITA)
6	February 5	Marang to Chukai	136.3 km (84.7 mi)	Stuart O'Grady (AUS)	Graeme Brown (AUS)	Simone Cadamuro (ITA)
7	February 6	Kuantan to Bentong	196 km (121.8 mi)	Graeme Brown (AUS)	Stuart O'Grady (AUS)	Allan Bo Andresen (DEN)
8	February 7	Menara Telekom to Seremban	112.5 km (69.9 mi)	Stuart O'Grady (AUS)	Miguel Ángel Martín Perdiguero (ESP)	Mikhaylo Khalilov (UKR)
9	February 8	Seremban to Genting Highlands	143.7 km (89.3 mi)	Hernán Darío Muñoz (COL)	Tom Danielson (USA)	Roland Green (CAN)
10	February 9	Kuala Lumpur Criterium	75.6 km (47.0 mi)	Guillermo Bongiorno (ARG)	Graeme Brown (AUS)	Stuart O'Grady (AUS)

== Classification leadership ==
Stage	Stage winner	General classification	Points classification	Mountains classification	Asian rider classification	Team classification	Asian team classification
1	Nathan O'Neill	Nathan O'Neill	Nathan O'Neill	Fortunato Baliani	Hossein Askari	Saturn	Iran
2	Luciano Pagliarini	Nathan O'Neill	Nathan O'Neill	Fortunato Baliani	Hossein Askari	Saturn	Iran
3	Luciano Pagliarini	Nathan O'Neill	Luciano Pagliarini	Fortunato Baliani	Hossein Askari	Saturn	Iran
4	Luciano Pagliarini	Nathan O'Neill	Luciano Pagliarini	Roland Green	Hossein Askari	Saturn	Iran
5	Graeme Brown	Nathan O'Neill	Graeme Brown	Roland Green	Hossein Askari	Saturn	Iran
6	Stuart O'Grady	Nathan O'Neill	Graeme Brown	Roland Green	Hossein Askari	Saturn	Iran
7	Graeme Brown	Tom Danielson	Graeme Brown	Roland Green	Hossein Askari	Saturn	Iran
8	Stuart O'Grady	Tom Danielson	Graeme Brown	Roland Green	Hossein Askari	Saturn	Iran
9	Hernán Darío Muñoz	Tom Danielson	Graeme Brown	Roland Green	Tomoya Kano	Colombia–Selle Italia	Iran
10	Guillermo Bongiorno	Tom Danielson	Graeme Brown	Roland Green	Tomoya Kano	Colombia–Selle Italia	Iran
Final		Tom Danielson	Graeme Brown	Roland Green	Tomoya Kano	Colombia–Selle Italia	Iran

== Final standings ==
=== General classification ===
	Rider	Team	Time
1	Tom Danielson (USA)	Saturn	31h 54' 09"
2	Hernán Darío Muñoz (COL)	Colombia–Selle Italia	+ 09"
3	Fredy González (COL)	Colombia–Selle Italia	+ 01' 44"
4	Roland Green (CAN)	Canada	+ 02' 03"
5	Josep Jufré (ESP)	Colchon Relax–Fuenlabrada	+ 02' 35"
6	Fortunato Baliani (ITA)	Formaggi Pinzolo Fiave	+ 02' 59"
7	Miguel Ángel Martín Perdiguero (ESP)	De Nardi–Colpack	+ 03' 09"
8	David George (RSA)	South Africa	+ 03' 35"
9	Ruber Marín (COL)	Colombia–Selle Italia	+ 03' 41"
10	Paolo Lanfranchi (ITA)	Ceramiche Panaria–Fiordo	+ 03' 48"

=== Points classification ===
	Rider	Team	Points
1	Graeme Brown (AUS)	Ceramiche Panaria–Fiordo	128
2	Stuart O'Grady (AUS)	Crédit Agricole	113
3	Allan Bo Andresen (DEN)	Team Fakta	74
4	Andrus Aug (EST)	De-Nardi Colpack	69
5	Miguel Ángel Martín Perdiguero (ESP)	De Nardi–Colpack	64
6	Luciano Pagliarini (BRA)	Lampre	56
7	Mikhaylo Khalilov (UKR)	Colombia–Selle Italia	54
8	Moreno Di Biase (ITA)	Formaggi Pinzolo Fiave	51
8	Hassan Maleki (IRI)	Iran	51
8	Gert Vanderaerden (BEL)	Palmans–Collstrop	51

=== Mountains classification ===
	Rider	Team	Points
1	Roland Green (CAN)	Canada	49
2	Koji Fukushima (JPN)	Japan	28
3	Hernán Darío Muñoz (COL)	Colombia–Selle Italia	27
4	Fortunato Baliani (ITA)	Formaggi Pinzolo Fiave	26
5	Ruber Marín (COL)	Colombia–Selle Italia	21
6	Tom Danielson (USA)	Saturn	20
7	Fredy González (COL)	Colombia–Selle Italia	12
7	Jose Manuel Maestre (ESP)	Colchon Relax–Fuenlabrada	12
7	Christopher Jenner (FRA)	Crédit Agricole	12
10	Thomas Evans (IRL)	Telekom Malaysia	11

=== Asian rider classification ===
	Rider	Team	Time
1	Tomoya Kano (JPN)	Japan	31h 59' 29"
2	Tonton Susanto (INA)	Telekom Malaysia	+ 20"
3	Ahad Kazemi (IRI)	Iran	+ 03' 10"
4	Ghader Mizbani (IRI)	Telekom Malaysia	+ 03' 35"
5	Victor Espiritu (PHI)	Philippines	+ 06' 55"
6	Mehdi Sohrabi (IRI)	Iran	+ 07' 22"
7	Hossein Askari (IRI)	Iran	+ 08' 08"
8	Hidenori Nodera (JPN)	Japan	+ 08' 11"
9	Suhardi Hassan (MAS)	Malaysia	+ 08' 40"
10	Alireza Haghi (IRI)	Iran	+ 09' 50"

=== Team classification ===
	Team	Time
1	Colombia–Selle Italia	95h 47' 07"
2	Saturn	+ 09' 32"
3	Lampre	+ 10' 09"
4	Colchon Relax–Fuenlabrada	+ 12' 33"
5	Formaggi Pinzolo Fiave	+ 14' 24"
6	De Nardi–Colpack	+ 15' 08"
7	De Nardi-Colpack	+ 16' 54"
8	Team Fakta	+ 17' 08"
9	Ceramiche Panaria–Fiordo	+ 17' 15"
10	Canada	+ 18' 01"

=== Asian team classification ===
	Team	Time
1	Iran	96h 11' 02"
2	Japan	+ 31"
3	Telekom Malaysia	+ 03' 50"
4	Malaysia	+ 22' 07"
5	Philippines	+ 24' 14"

== List of teams and riders ==
A total of 20 teams were invited to participate in the 2003 Tour de Langkawi. Out of the 138 riders, a total of 122 riders made it to the finish in Kuala Lumpur.

Colombia–Selle Italia

- (Colombia) Hernán Darío Muñoz
- (Colombia) Fredy González
- (Australia) Russel Van Hout
- (Colombia) Ruber Marín
- (Colombia) Urbelino Mesa
- (Ukraine) Mikhaylo Khalilov
- (Venezuela) José Rujano

Lampre

- (Italy) Gabriele Missaglia
- (United Kingdom) Maximilian Sciandri
- (Switzerland) Rubens Bertogliati
- (Italy) Daniele Righi
- (Italy) Marco Pinotti
- (Brazil) Luciano Pagliarini
- (Italy) Marco Serpellini

De Nardi–Colpack

- (Spain) Santos González
- (Spain) Miguel Ángel Martín Perdiguero
- (Spain) Rubén Lobato
- (Italy) Lorenzo Cardellini
- (Italy) Filippo Simeoni
- (Italy) Sergio Marinangeli

Crédit Agricole

- (Australia) Stuart O'Grady
- (France) Christopher Jenner
- (Australia) Corey Sweet
- (France) Eric Leblacher
- (France) Yohann Charpenteau
- (France) Yan Tournier

Team Fakta

- (Denmark) René Jørgensen
- (Denmark) Jørgen Bo Petersen
- (United Kingdom) Julian Winn
- (Denmark) Lars Bak
- (Denmark) Allan Bo Andresen
- (Denmark) Jacob Moe Rasmussen
- (Norway) Bjørnar Vestøl

Marlux-Ville De Charlerois

- (Belgium) Dave Bruylandts
- (Luxembourg) Christian Poos
- (Latvia) Raivis Belohvoščiks
- (Belgium) Johan Dekkers
- (France) Guillaume Girout
- (France) Charles Guilbert
- (Belgium) Sébastien Mattozza

De Nardi-Colpack

- (Estonia) Andrus Aug
- (Italy) Simone Cadamuro
- (Italy) Michele Colleoni
- (Czech Republic) Ondrej Fadrny
- (Italy) Andrea Rossi
- (United Kingdom) Charly Wegelius
- (Italy) Michele Gobbi

Telekom Malaysia

- (Hong Kong) Wong Kam-po
- (Iran) Ghader Mizbani
- (Republic of Ireland) Thomas Evans
- (Indonesia) Tonton Susanto
- (Italy) Simone Mori
- (Malaysia) Nor Effendy Rosli
- (Malaysia) Tsen Seong Hoong

Ceramiche Panaria–Fiordo

- (Italy) Paolo Lanfranchi
- (Australia) Graeme Brown
- (Australia) Brett Lancaster
- (Australia) Scott Davis
- (Ukraine) Sergiy Matveyev
- (Italy) Filippo Perfetto
- (Argentina) Guillermo Bongiorno

Saturn

- (United States) Chris Horner
- (United States) Tom Danielson
- (Canada) Charles Dionne
- (United States) Tim Johnson
- (Australia) Nathan O'Neill
- (Canada) Eric Wohlberg
- (United States) Phil Zajicek

Colchon Relax–Fuenlabrada

- (Spain) Josep Jufré
- (Spain) David Fernández Domingo
- (Spain) Nácor Burgos
- (Spain) Oscar Laguna Garcia
- (Spain) German Nieto Fernandez
- (Spain) Jose Manuel Maestre
- (Spain) José Manuel Vázquez Palomo

Formaggi Pinzolo Fiave

- (Italy) Biagio Conte
- (Italy) Moreno Di Biase
- (Italy) Fortunato Baliani
- (Italy) Domenico Gualdi
- (Colombia) Luis Felipe Laverde
- (Italy) Matteo Cappe
- (Italy) Massimo Amichetti

Flanders-iTeamNova

- (Belgium) Ronny Assez
- (Australia) Jamie Drew
- (New Zealand) Scott Guyton
- (Australia) Allan Iacuone
- (Belgium) Jurgen Landrie
- (Australia) David McKenzie
- (Australia) Trent Wilson

Malaysia

- (Malaysia) Shahrulneeza Razali
- (Malaysia) Wong Ah Thiam
- (Malaysia) Mohd Mahadzir Hamad
- (Malaysia) Musairi Musa
- (Malaysia) Shahrizan Selamat
- (Malaysia) Suhardi Hassan
- (Malaysia) Mohd Sazlee Ismail

Canada

- (Canada) Roland Green
- (Canada) Seamus McGrath
- (Canada) Peter Wedge
- (Canada) Cory Lange
- (Canada) Alexandre Lavallée
- (Canada) Gordon Fraser
- (Canada) Bruno Langlois

Palmans–Collstrop

- (Belgium) Thierry De Groote
- (Belgium) Kristof Trouve
- (Belgium) Hendrik Van Dyck
- (Belgium) Michel Van Haecke
- (Belgium) Erwin Thijs
- (Belgium) Peter Wuyts
- (Belgium) Gert Vanderaerden

South Africa

- (South Africa) Malcolm Lange
- (South Africa) Simon Kessler
- (South Africa) Johan Van Der Berg
- (South Africa) Morné Bester
- (South Africa) Owen Hannie
- (South Africa) Ross Grant
- (South Africa) David George

Japan

- (Japan) Tomoya Kano
- (Japan) Shinri Suzuki
- (Japan) Hidenori Nodera
- (Japan) Kazuya Okazaki
- (Japan) Satoshi Hirose
- (Japan) Koki Shimbo
- (Japan) Koji Fukushima

Philippines

- (Philippines) Victor Espiritu
- (Philippines) Arnel Quirimit
- (Philippines) Merculio Ramos
- (Philippines) Villamor Baluyut
- (Philippines) Enrique Domingo
- (Philippines) Warren Davadilla
- (Philippines) Lloyd Lucien Reynante

Iran

- (Iran) Ahad Kazemi
- (Iran) Hossein Askari
- (Iran) Alireza Haghi
- (Iran) Mehdi Sohrabi
- (Iran) Hassan Maleki
- (Iran) Rasoul Farshbaf
- (Iran) Sirous Hashemzadeh
