= 2000 Tour de Langkawi =

Race details
- Dates: 25 January–6 February 2000
- Stages: 12+Prologue
- Distance: 1,604.9 km (997.2 mi)
- Winning time: 38h 34' 39"

Results
Jersey awarded to the overall winner	Winner	Chris Horner (USA)	(Mercury)
	Second	Julio Alberto Pérez (MEX)	(Ceramica Panaria–Gaerne)
	Third	Fortunato Baliani (ITA)	(Aguardiente Néctar–Selle Italia)
Jersey awarded to the points classification winner	Points	Gordon Fraser (CAN)	(Mercury)
Jersey awarded to the mountains classification winner	Mountains	Julio Alberto Pérez (MEX)	(Ceramica Panaria–Gaerne)
	Team	Mercury	

The 2000 Tour de Langkawi was the 5th edition of the Tour de Langkawi, a cycling stage race that took place in Malaysia. It began with a prologue criterium on 25 January in Langkawi and ended on 6 February in Kuala Lumpur. In fact, this race was rated by the Union Cycliste Internationale (UCI) as a 2.4 category race.

Chris Horner of USA won the race, followed by Julio Alberto Pérez of Mexico second and Fortunato Baliani of Italy third. Gordon Fraser won the points classification category and Julio Alberto Pérez won the mountains classification category. Mercury won the team classification category.

== Stages ==
The cyclists competed in 12 stages, covering a distance of 1,604.9 kilometres. Prologue did not count towards the overall but many riders competed in the stage.

Stage	Date	Course	Distance	Stage result		
Stage	Date	Course	Distance	Winner	Second	Third
P	25 January	Langkawi Criterium	50 km (31.1 mi)	Graeme Miller (NZL)	Jans Koerts (NED)	Jan Bratkowski (GER)
1	26 January	Langkawi Individual time trial	9.2 km (5.7 mi)	Floyd Landis (USA)	Frank McCormack (USA)	Daniele Contrini (ITA)
2	27 January	Alor Setar to Batu Ferringhi	173 km (107.5 mi)	Jamie Drew (AUS)	Daniele Contrini (ITA)	René Haselbacher (AUT)
3	28 January	Taiping to Sitiawan	86.1 km (53.5 mi)	Damien Nazon (FRA)	Gordon Fraser (CAN)	René Haselbacher (AUT)
4	29 January	Lumut to Tanah Rata	162 km (100.7 mi)	Wong Kam-po (HKG)	Mark Walters (CAN)	Julio Alberto Pérez (MEX)
5	30 January	Tapah to Bentong	168.9 km (104.9 mi)	Glen Mitchell (NZL)	Trent Klasna (USA)	Gordon Fraser (CAN)
6	31 January	Bentong to Kuantan	191.2 km (118.8 mi)	Antonio Cruz (USA)	Fortunato Baliani (ITA)	Chris Horner (USA)
7	1 February	Kuantan to Kuala Rompin	133.5 km (83.0 mi)	Ivan Quaranta (ITA)	Luca Cei (ITA)	Gordon Fraser (CAN)
8	2 February	Mersing to Malacca	244.8 km (152.1 mi)	Ivan Quaranta (ITA)	Gordon Fraser (CAN)	Sven Teutenberg (GER)
9	3 February	Malacca to Kajang	115.5 km (71.8 mi)	Guido Trenti (USA)	Henk Vogels (AUS)	Torsten Schmidt (GER)
10	4 February	KL Tower to Genting Highlands	111.3 km (69.2 mi)	Julio Alberto Pérez (MEX)	Matthew Stephens (GBR)	Walter Bénéteau (FRA)
11	5 February	Shah Alam	134.4 km (83.5 mi)	Ivan Quaranta (ITA)	Damien Nazon (FRA)	Gordon Fraser (CAN)
12	6 February	Kuala Lumpur Criterium	75.3 km (46.8 mi)	Jan Bratkowski (GER)	Antonio Cruz (USA)	Volker Ordowski (GER)

== Classification leadership ==
Stage	Stage winner	General classification	Points classification	Mountains classification	Asian rider classification	Team classification	Asian team classification
1	Floyd Landis	Floyd Landis	Floyd Landis	Floyd Landis	Makoto Iijima	Saturn	Japan
2	Jamie Drew	Daniele Contrini	Daniele Contrini	Graziano Recinella	Makoto Iijima	Saturn	Japan
3	Damien Nazon	Daniele Contrini	Gordon Fraser	Graziano Recinella	Makoto Iijima	Saturn	Japan
4	Wong Kam-po	Mark Walters	Gordon Fraser	Julio Alberto Pérez	Wong Kam-po	Saturn	Japan
5	Glen Mitchell	Mark Walters	Gordon Fraser	Lennie Kristensen	Wong Kam-po	Saturn	Japan
6	Antonio Cruz	Chris Horner	Gordon Fraser	Lennie Kristensen	Wong Kam-po	Saturn	Japan
7	Ivan Quaranta	Chris Horner	Gordon Fraser	Lennie Kristensen	Wong Kam-po	Saturn	Japan
8	Ivan Quaranta	Chris Horner	Gordon Fraser	Lennie Kristensen	Wong Kam-po	Saturn	Japan
9	Guido Trenti	Chris Horner	Gordon Fraser	Lennie Kristensen	Wong Kam-po	Saturn	Japan
10	Julio Alberto Pérez	Chris Horner	Gordon Fraser	Julio Alberto Pérez	Wong Kam-po	Mercury	Japan
11	Ivan Quaranta	Chris Horner	Gordon Fraser	Julio Alberto Pérez	Wong Kam-po	Mercury	Japan
12	Jan Bratkowski	Chris Horner	Gordon Fraser	Julio Alberto Pérez	Wong Kam-po	Mercury	Japan
Final		Chris Horner	Gordon Fraser	Julio Alberto Pérez	Wong Kam-po	Mercury	Japan

== Final standings ==
=== General classification ===
	Rider	Team	Time
1	Chris Horner (USA)	Mercury	38h 34' 39"
2	Julio Alberto Pérez (MEX)	Ceramica Panaria–Gaerne	+ 27"
3	Fortunato Baliani (ITA)	Aguardiente Néctar–Selle Italia	+ 29"
4	Matthew Stephens (GBR)	Linda McCartney Cycling Team	+ 01' 05"
5	Floyd Landis (USA)	Mercury	+ 01' 48"
6	Lennie Kristensen (DEN)	Denmark	+ 01' 50"
7	Graziano Recinella (ITA)	Mobilvetta Design–Rossin	+ 02' 02"
8	René Haselbacher (AUT)	Gerolsteiner	+ 02' 04"
9	Chris Wherry (USA)	Saturn	+ 02' 25"
10	Loic Lamouller (FRA)	BigMat–Auber 93	+ 02' 27"

=== Points classification ===
	Rider	Team	Points
1	Gordon Fraser (CAN)	Mercury	111
2	Guido Trenti (USA)	Cantina Tollo–Regain	87
3	René Haselbacher (GER)	Gerolsteiner	82
4	Jans Koerts (NED)	Farm Frites	58
5	Ivan Quaranta (ITA)	Mobilvetta Design–Rossin	55
6	Franky Van Haesebroucke (BEL)	Telekom Malaysia All-Stars	52
7	Kosie Loubser (RSA)	South Africa	50
8	Antonio Cruz (USA)	Saturn	48
9	Damien Nazon (FRA)	Bonjour	41
9	Jan Bratkowski (GER)	Mercury	41

=== Mountains classification ===
	Rider	Team	Points
1	Julio Alberto Pérez (MEX)	Ceramica Panaria–Gaerne	66
2	Lennie Kristensen (DEN)	Denmark	57
3	Floyd Landis (USA)	Mercury	34
4	Mark Walters (CAN)	Canada	34
5	Wong Kam-po (HKG)	Telekom Malaysia All-Stars	31
6	Graziano Recinella (ITA)	Mobilvetta Design–Rossin	30
7	Matthew Stephens (GBR)	Linda McCartney Cycling Team	20
8	Tom Leaper (AUS)	Ceramica Panaria–Gaerne	20
9	Chris Horner (USA)	Mercury	17
10	Walter Bénéteau (FRA)	Bonjour	16

=== Asian rider classification ===
	Rider	Team	Time
1	Wong Kam-po (HKG)	Telekom Malaysia All-Stars	38h 41' 16"
2	Sharulneeza Razali (MAS)	Malaysia	+ 03' 39"
3	Hidenori Nodera (JPN)	Japan	+ 04' 35"
4	Victor Espiritu (PHI)	Philippines	+ 06' 14"
5	Yasutaka Tashiro (JPN)	Japan	+ 07' 54"
6	Yoshimasa Hirose (JPN)	Japan	+ 18' 34"
7	Musairi Musa (MAS)	Malaysia	+ 19' 47"
8	Merculio Ramos (PHI)	Philippines	+ 20' 01"
9	Zhu Yongbiao (CHN)	China	+ 20' 16"
10	Makoto Iijima (JPN)	Japan	+ 22' 44"

=== Team classification ===
	Team	Time
1	Mercury	115h 44' 59"
2	South Africa	+ 38"
3	Saturn	+ 03' 08"
4	Linda McCartney Cycling Team	+ 04' 03"
5	Denmark	+ 05' 05"
6	Gerolsteiner	+ 05' 56"
7	Aguardiente Néctar–Selle Italia	+ 10' 02"
8	Canada	+ 18' 49"
9	BigMat–Auber 93	+ 26' 14"
10	Japan	+ 31' 22"

=== Asian team classification ===
	Team	Time
1	Japan	116h 16' 21"
2	Philippines	+ 32' 21"
3	Malaysia	+ 38' 28"
4	China	+ 1h 25' 08"
5	Indonesia	+ 2h 23' 50"

== List of teams and riders ==
A total of 25 teams were invited to participate in the 2000 Tour de Langkawi. Out of the 149 riders, a total of 126 riders made it to the finish in Kuala Lumpur.

Farm Frites

- (Russia) Sergei Ivanov
- (Belgium) Dave Bruylandts
- (Netherlands) Jans Koerts
- (Sweden) Michel Lafis
- (Sweden) Glenn Magnusson
- (Netherlands) Koos Moerenhout

Cantina Tollo–Regain

- (United States) Guido Trenti
- (Italy) Marco Di Renzo
- (Italy) Federico Giabbecucci
- (Italy) Emanuele Negrini
- (Italy) Germano Pierdomenico

Liquigas–Pata

- (Italy) Daniele Contrini
- (Italy) Fabio Marchesin
- (Italy) Christian Morini
- (Italy) Giancarlo Raimondi
- (Italy) Ellis Rastelli
- (Slovenia) Gorazd Štangelj

Ceramica Panaria–Gaerne

- (Mexico) Julio Alberto Pérez
- (Italy) Luca Cei
- (Italy) Enrico Degano
- (Australia) Nathan O'Neill
- (Australia) Tom Leaper
- (Ukraine) Vladimir Duma

BigMat–Auber 93

- (France) Thierry Gouvenou
- (Russia) Alexei Sivakov
- (France) Lylian Lebreton
- (Russia) Oleg Joukov
- (France) Loic Lamouller
- (France) Denis Leproux

Phonak

- (Austria) Matthias Buxhofer
- (Canada) Dominique Perras
- (Belarus) Alexandre Usov
- (Switzerland) René Stadelmann
- (Austria) Jochen Summer
- (France) Jérôme Delbove

Mróz–Supradyn Witaminy

- (Poland) Jacek Mickiewicz
- (Poland) Piotr Chmielewski
- (Poland) Grzegorz Wajs
- (Poland) Dariusz Wojciechowski
- (Poland) Arkadiusz Wojtas
- (Poland) Sebastian Wolski

Saturn

- (United States) Frank McCormack
- (United States) Antonio Cruz
- (United States) Mark McCormack
- (United States) Chris Wherry
- (Canada) Michael Barry
- (United States) Trent Klasna

Linda McCartney Cycling Team

- (Australia) Benjamin Brooks
- (Australia) David McKenzie
- (Norway) Bjørnar Vestøl
- (United Kingdom) Matthew Stephens
- (Republic of Ireland) Ciarán Power
- (United Kingdom) Spencer Smith

Telekom Malaysia All-Stars

- (New Zealand) Graeme Miller
- (New Zealand) Glen Mitchell
- (Hong Kong) Wong Kam-po
- (Malaysia) Nor Effandy Rosli
- (Netherlands) John Talen
- (Belgium) Franky Van Haesebroucke

Mobilvetta Design–Rossin

- (Russia) Evgeni Berzin
- (Italy) Ivan Quaranta
- (Italy) Corrado Serina
- (Italy) Alberto Ongarato
- (Italy) Graziano Recinella
- (Russia) Serguei Lelekin

Bonjour

- (France) Frédéric Gabriel
- (France) Pascal Deramé
- (France) Christophe Faudot
- (France) Damien Nazon
- (France) Mickaël Pichon
- (France) Walter Bénéteau

Gerolsteiner

- (Germany) Torsten Schmidt
- (Germany) Sven Teutenberg
- (Austria) Peter Wrolich
- (Germany) Volker Ordowski
- (Germany) Uwe Peschel
- (Austria) René Haselbacher

Mercury

- (Australia) Henk Vogels
- (Germany) Jan Bratkowski
- (Canada) Gordon Fraser
- (United States) Chris Horner
- (United States) Floyd Landis
- (Switzerland) Steve Zampeiri

Collstrop–De Federale Verzekeringen

- (Belgium) Danny Baeyens
- (Belgium) Tony Bracke
- (Belgium) Eric De Clercq
- (Belgium) Dirk Aernouts
- (Belgium) Koen Deschuytter
- (Ukraine) Oleg Pankov

Aguardiente Néctar–Selle Italia

- (Colombia) Chepe González
- (Italy) Fortunato Baliani
- (Italy) Gianluca Tonetti
- (Italy) Andrea Paluan
- (Latvia) Andris Naudužs
- (Australia) Jamie Drew

Malaysia

- (Malaysia) Sharulneeza Razali
- (Malaysia) Tsen Seong Hoong
- (Malaysia) Wong Ah Thiam
- (Malaysia) Musairi Musa
- (Malaysia) Mohd Mahazir Hamad
- (Malaysia) Mohd Suhaimi Keton

South Africa

- (South Africa) Daniel Spence
- (South Africa) Tiaan Kannemeyer
- (South Africa) Ryan Cox
- (South Africa) Simon Kessler
- (South Africa) Kosie Loubser
- (South Africa) Douglas Ryder

Indonesia

- (Indonesia) Sulistiono Sulistiono
- (Indonesia) Wawan Setyobudi
- (Indonesia) Hengky Setiawan
- (Indonesia) Agung Joni Suryo
- (Indonesia) Suyitno Suyitno
- (Indonesia) Herry Janto Setiawan

China

- (China) Li Fuyu
- (China) Feng Luanyun
- (China) Li Fuji
- (China) Wong Guozhang
- (China) Xiao Yechen
- (China) Zhu Yongbiao

Denmark

- (Denmark) Lennie Kristensen
- (Denmark) Morten Sonne
- (Denmark) Martin Kryger
- (Denmark) Jan Jespersen
- (Denmark) Dennis Rasmussen
- (Denmark) Stig Dam

Japan

- (Japan) Makoto Iijima
- (Japan) Yasutaka Tashiro
- (Japan) Hidenori Nodera
- (Japan) Hideto Yukinari
- (Japan) Yoshimasa Hirose
- (Japan) Yasuhiro Yamamoto

Philippines

- (Philippines) Victor Espiritu
- (Philippines) Warren Davadilla
- (Philippines) Arnel Quirimit
- (Philippines) Enrique Domingo
- (Philippines) Villamor Baluyut
- (Philippines) Merculio Ramos

Canada

- (Canada) Eric Wohlberg
- (Canada) Mark Walters
- (Canada) Paul Kelly
- (Canada) Mat Anand
- (Canada) Sylvain Beauchamp
- (Canada) Peter Wedge

Nürnberger

- (Russia) Artour Babaitsev
- (Switzerland) Christoph Goehring
- (Germany) Alexander Kastenhuber
- (Switzerland) Roland Mueller
- (Germany) Heinrich Trumheller
- (Germany) Jürgen Werner
