= Palmans-Collstrop =

Palmans-Collstrop may refer to:

- Cycle Collstrop, a Swedish cycling team
- Palmans–Cras, a Belgian cycling team
