= 1997 Tour de Langkawi =

Race details
- Dates: 13–24 February 1997
- Stages: 12
- Distance: 1,538 km (956 mi)
- Winning time: 35h 44' 25"

Results
Jersey awarded to the overall winner	Winner	Luca Scinto (ITA)	(MG Maglificio–Technogym)
	Second	Jens Voigt (GER)	(ZVVZ-Giant-AIS)
	Third	Alberto Elli (ITA)	(Casino)
Jersey awarded to the points classification winner	Points	Luca Scinto (ITA)	(MG Maglificio–Technogym)
Jersey awarded to the mountains classification winner	Mountains	Luca Scinto (ITA)	(MG Maglificio–Technogym)
	Team	MG Maglificio–Technogym	

The 1997 Tour de Langkawi was the second edition of the Tour de Langkawi, a cycling stage race that took place in Malaysia. It started on 13 February in Kota Kinabalu and ended on 24 February in Langkawi. The race was sanctioned by the Union Cycliste Internationale (UCI) as a 2.5 category race.

Italian Luca Scinto won the race, Jens Voigt of Germany second and Alberto Elli third. Scinto also won the points classification and mountains classification of the race. MG Maglificio–Technogym won the team classification of the race.

== Stages ==
The cyclist competed in 12 stages over 12 days, covering a distance of 1,538 kilometres.

Stage	Date	Course	Distance	Stage result		
Stage	Date	Course	Distance	Winner	Second	Third
1	13 February	Kota Kinabalu, Sabah Individual time trial	19.1 km (11.9 mi)	Eric Wohlberg (CAN)	Andrey Mizurov (KAZ)	Roland Green (CAN)
2	14 February	Sarawak Criterium	52.8 km (32.8 mi)	Frank McCormack (USA)	Glen Mitchell (NZL)	Mariano Friedick (USA)
3	15 February	Johor to Malacca City	92 km (57.2 mi)	Andrea Tafi (ITA)	Nicola Loda (ITA)	Mark McCormack (USA)
4	16 February	Port Dickson to Sunway Lagoon	203.5 km (126.4 mi)	Frank McCormack (USA)	Heinrich Trumheller (GER)	Alberto Elli (ITA)
5	17 February	Berjaya Times Square to Kuala Lumpur	159.1 km (98.9 mi)	Andreas Walzer (GER)	Marc Vlijm (NED)	Juris Silovs (LAT)
6	18 February	Bukit Kiara to Genting Highlands	71.3 km (44.3 mi)	Luca Scinto (ITA)	Paolo Bettini (ITA)	Nicola Loda (ITA)
7	19 February	Bentong to Kuantan	198 km (123.0 mi)	Frank McCormack (USA)	Gerard Kemper (NED)	Andrea Tafi (ITA)
8	20 February	Kuantan to Kuala Terengganu	204.9 km (127.3 mi)	Brian Walton (CAN)	Jay Sweet (AUS)	Gerard Kemper (NED)
9	21 February	Kuala Terengganu to Kota Bharu	164.3 km (102.1 mi)	Andrea Tafi (ITA)	Mark McCormack (USA)	Christophe Agnolutto (FRA)
10	22 February	Jeli to Gerik	123.2 km (76.6 mi)	Gianni Bugno (ITA)	John Tanner (GBR)	Franz Hotz (SUI)
11	23 February	Kangar to Penang	189.4 km (117.7 mi)	Fabiano Fontanelli (ITA)	Jay Sweet (AUS)	Marc-Timo Weichert (GER)
12	24 February	Langkawi Criterium	60.5 km (37.6 mi)	Fabiano Fontanelli (ITA)	Gerard Kemper (NED)	Andrus Aug (EST)

== Final standings ==
=== General classification ===
	Rider	Time
1	Luca Scinto (ITA)	35h 44' 25"
2	Jens Voigt (GER)	+ 02' 24"
3	Alberto Elli (ITA)	+ 02' 29"
4	Angelo Lecchi (ITA)	+ 02' 31"
5	Nicola Loda (ITA)	+ 02' 45"
6	Andrew McLean (RSA)	+ 02' 46"
7	Sergey Lavrenenko (KAZ)	+ 02' 46"
8	Paolo Bettini (ITA)	+ 03' 11"
9	Philippe Bordenave (FRA)	+ 03' 45"
10	Volker Ordowski (GER)	+ 03' 46"
