= Stive Vermaut =

Belgian cyclist

- Vermaut in 1998

Personal information
- Born: 22 October 1975 Ostend, Belgium
- Died: 30 June 2004 (aged 28) Roeselare, Belgium

Cycling career
- Sport: Cycling
- Discipline: Road
- Role: Rider

Amateur team
- 1997: Vlaanderen 2002–Eddy Merckx (stagiaire)

Professional teams
- 1998–1999: Vlaanderen 2002–Eddy Merckx
- 2000: U.S. Postal Service
- 2001–2002: Lotto–Adecco
- 2002: Palmans–Collstrop

Stive Vermaut (22 October 1975 – 30 June 2004) was a Belgian cyclist.

== Cycling career ==
Vermaut was born in Ostend. He turned professional in 1998 with the team Vlaanderen 2002–Eddy Merckx, after riding with them as a stagiaire the previous year. In 1999, he won a stage of the Circuit des Mines and placed sixth in the Circuito Montañés and Cholet-Pays de Loire, ninth in the Tour de l'Avenir, and tenth in the Grand Prix de Wallonie and the Deutschland Tour. In 2000, he joined the American team U.S. Postal Service, led by Belgian Johan Bruyneel. In 2001, he joined the Belgian team Lotto–Adecco. He participated in the Tour de France, where he finished 36th overall.

With heart problems early in the 2002 season, he was forced to stop cycling. Medical examinations revealed that he suffered from tachyarrhythmia and the right part of his heart was overdeveloped. The team's doctor declared him unfit to ride. In July, Vermaut received word from another doctor that he was fit to ride again. He joined Palmans–Collstrop for the remainder of the season, but ended his career at the end, as new problems were arising.

== Death ==
In June 2004, Vermaut was transported unconscious to Roeselare Hospital following a heart attack. He died there a few days later of a brain haemorrhage.

The Omloop van de Westhoek was renamed Omloop van de Westhoek-Memorial Stive Vermaut later that year.

== Major results ==
1996
1st De Drie Zustersteden
1st Stage 5 Tour de Namur
2nd La Flèche Namuroise
1997
3rd Overall Volta a Lleida

1st Stage 1

1st Stage 6 Tour de Namur
3rd Mémorial Danny Jonckheere
8th Seraing–Aachen–Seraing
1998
7th GP du Nord Pas de Calais
8th Kampioenschap van Vlaanderen
1999
1st Stage 8 Circuit des Mines
2nd La Flèche Namuroise
6th Egmont Cycling Race
6th Overall Circuito Montañés
6th Cholet-Pays de Loire
9th Overall Tour de l'Avenir

1st Mountains Classification

10th Overall Deutschland Tour
10th Grand Prix de Wallonie
2001
National Road Championships

7th Individual Time trial
10th Road race

7th Grand Prix of Aargau Canton
2002
9th Grand Prix d'Isbergues
10th Overall Tour de Langkawi
