= Vanderaerden =

Vanderaerden is a surname. Notable people with the surname include:

- Eric Vanderaerden (born 1962), Belgian racing cyclist
- Gert Vanderaerden (born 1973), Belgian racing cyclist, brother of Eric
- Michael Vanderaerden (born 1987), Belgian racing cyclist
