= Graeme Brown =

Australian cyclist (born 1979)

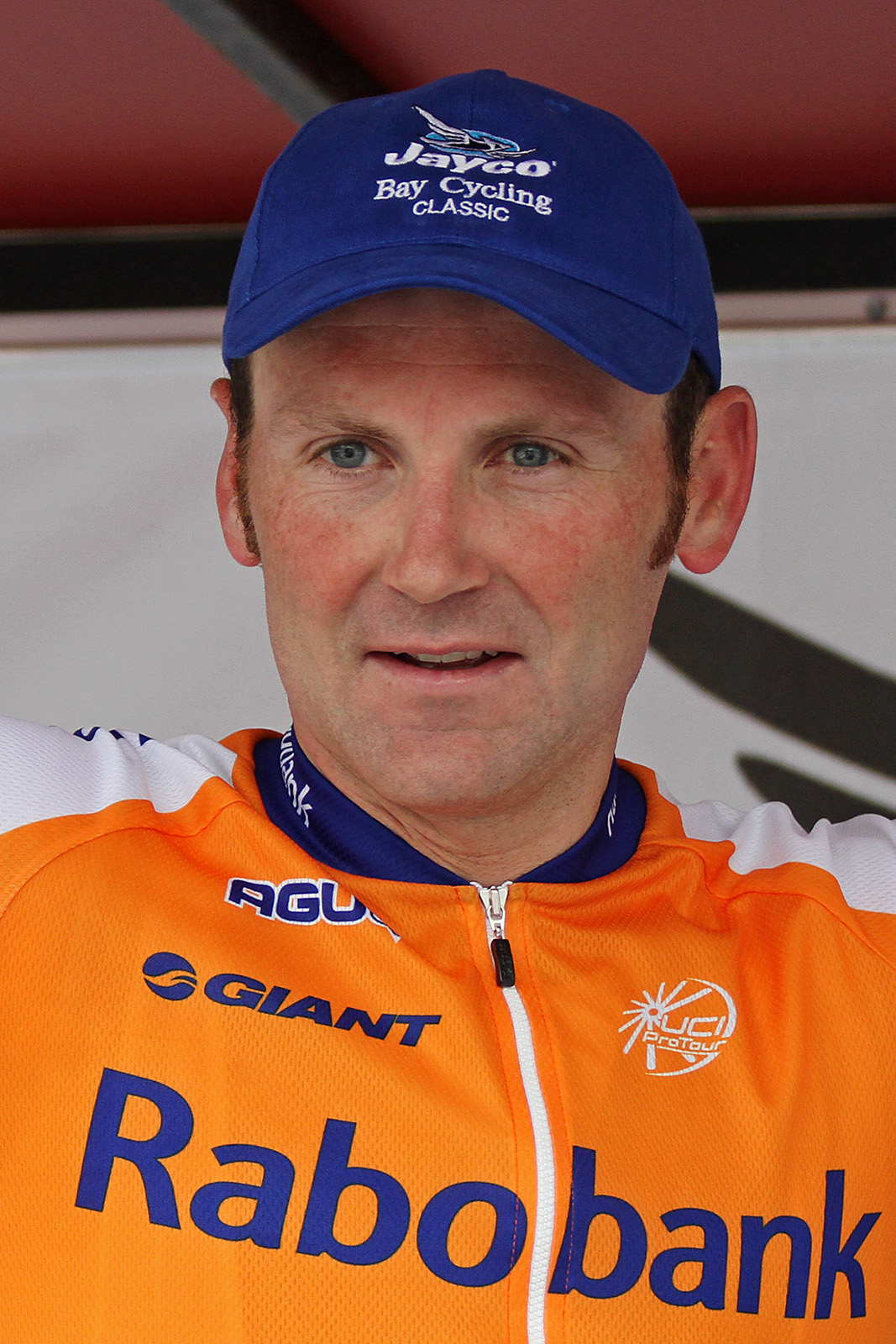
- Brown at the 2010 Bay Classic Series

Personal information
- Full name: Graeme Allen Brown
- Nickname: Brownie
- Born: 9 April 1979 (age 47) Darwin, Australia
- Height: 1.80 m (5 ft 11 in)
- Weight: 76 kg (168 lb)

Cycling career
- Sport: Cycling
- Current team: Retired
- Disciplines: Road; Track
- Role: Rider
- Rider type: Sprinter

Amateur team
- Randwick Botany Cycling Club

Professional teams
- 2002–2005: Ceramiche Panaria–Fiordo
- 2006–2014: Rabobank
- 2015–2016: Drapac Professional Cycling
Medal record
Men's track cycling
Representing Australia
Olympic Games
Gold medal – first place	2004 Athens	4000m Team Pursuit
Gold medal – first place	2004 Athens	Madison
Commonwealth Games
Gold medal – first place	2002 Manchester	4000m Team Pursuit
Gold medal – first place	2002 Manchester	Scratch Race

Graeme Allen Brown OAM (born 9 April 1979 in Darwin, Northern Territory) is an Australian former professional cyclist, who competed professionally between 2002 and 2016 for the Ceramica Panaria–Navigare, Belkin Pro Cycling and Drapac Professional Cycling teams.

A former Australian Institute of Sport scholarship holder, Brown's greatest success as a road cyclist came in the Tour de Langkawi in Malaysia, including a record-breaking 5 stage wins in 2005 and winning the Points Classification in 2003 and 2005.

As a track cyclist he won a gold medal at the 2004 Summer Olympics in Athens as a member of the team pursuit (with Bradley McGee, Brett Lancaster, and Luke Roberts) in world record-breaking time of 3:58.233. He also won a gold medal with Stuart O'Grady for the Madison event at the 2004 Summer Olympics. At the 2002 Commonwealth Games in Manchester he won two gold medals: for the Team pursuit, and the Scratch Race.

== Mark French accusations ==
At a hearing before the Court of Arbitration for Sport, cyclist Mark French gave sworn evidence that named Shane Kelly, Sean Eadie, Jobie Dajka, and Graeme Brown as riders who often injected vitamins and supplements in his room. 13 ampoules labelled EquiGen (equine growth hormone, an illegal doping agent), syringes and vitamins had been discovered by cleaners outside French's boarding room at the Australian Institute of Sport. On testing, some of the syringes were also found to contain the EquiGen hormone. French's lifetime ban was ultimately overturned on appeal, and Brown himself was never charged with any offense.

== Personal life ==
Brown hails from Menai, an outer suburb of Sydney. He has three sons and a daughter. Recently married Brooke Colton.

== Career achievements ==
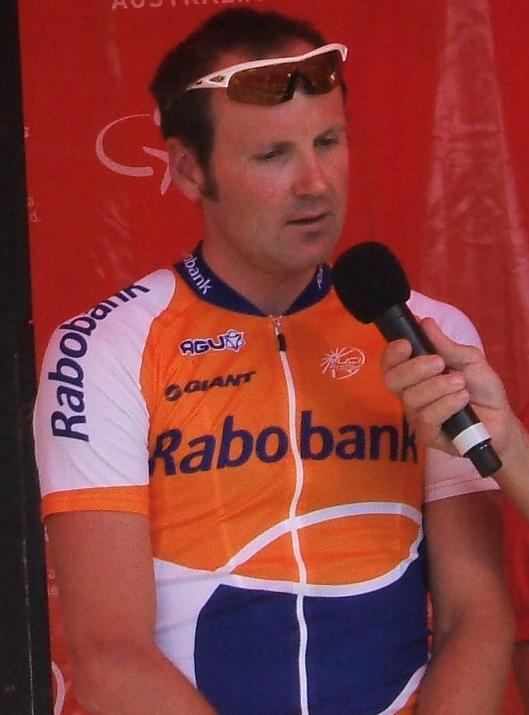
Brown at the 2009 Tour Down Under

=== Major results ===
1996
1st Sprint, National Junior Track Championships
1997
1st Team pursuit, UCI Junior Track World Championships
1st Team pursuit, National Junior Track Championships
1998
1st Stage 8 Commonwealth Bank Cycle Classic
1999
UCI Track Cycling World Cup Classics

1st Team pursuit, Frisco
1st Team pursuit, Cali

1st Points race, National Track Championships
1st Team pursuit, Oceania International Grand Prix
2000
UCI Track Cycling World Cup Classics, Cali

1st Madison
2nd Team pursuit

1st Team pursuit, National Track Championships
2001
1st Stage 1 Tour Down Under
1st Stage 6 Giro delle Regioni
1st Stage 6 Tour of Japan
6th Circuito del Porto
2002
1st Points race, UCI Track Cycling World Cup Classics, Moscow
Commonwealth Games

1st Team pursuit
1st Scratch

Tour de Langkawi

1st Stages 6 & 10

2003
1st Team pursuit, UCI Track Cycling World Championships
1st Madison, National Track Championships (with Mark Renshaw)
Tour de Langkawi

1st Points classification
1st Stages 5 & 7

1st Points classification Perth Criterium Series
1st Stage 6 Tour Down Under
2004
Olympic Games

1st Team pursuit
1st Madison (with Stuart O'Grady)

2005
Tour de Langkawi

1st Points classification
1st Stages 1, 5, 7, 9 & 10

2nd Coppa Bernocchi
3rd Giro della Romagna
2006
1st Tour de Rijke
Deutschland Tour

1st Stages 4 & 8

3rd Ronde van Midden-Zeeland
5th Classic Haribo
5th Scheldeprijs
5th Noord-Nederland Tour
8th International Grand Prix Doha
2007
1st Stage 1 Tour of California
1st Stage 3 Vuelta a Murcia
1st Stage 2 Tour de Pologne
2nd Overall Niedersachsen Rundfahrt
2nd Ronde van het Groene Hart
2nd Rund um Köln
2nd Tour de Rijke
4th Ronde van Midden-Zeeland
5th Scheldeprijs
2008
1st Trofeo Cala Millor-Cala Bona
1st Stage 1 Vuelta a Murcia
1st Stage 3 Tour Down Under
2nd Trofeo Mallorca
3rd Clásica de Almería
2009
1st Nokere Koerse
1st Omloop van het Houtland
1st Stage 3 Tour Down Under
Vuelta a Murcia

1st Stages 1 & 5

2nd Trofeo Cala Millor
2nd Clásica de Almería
2nd Ronde van het Groene Hart
2nd Dutch Food Valley Classic
5th Batavus Prorace
2010
1st Stage 1 Bay Classic Series
1st Stage 8 Tour of Austria
3rd Overall Delta Tour Zeeland
3rd Clásica de Almería
4th Ronde van het Groene Hart
5th Rund um Köln
2011
3rd Nokere Koerse
10th Overall Delta Tour Zeeland
2012
6th Handzame Classic
2013
4th Omloop van het Houtland
2015
8th Road race, Oceania Road Championships

==== Grand Tour general classification results timeline ====
Grand Tour	2002	2003	2004	2005	2006	2007	2008	2009	2010	2011	2012	2013
Giro d'Italia	DNF	DNF	—	—	DNF	DNF	DNF	—	130	DNF	DNF	—
Tour de France	Did not contest during career											
Vuelta a España	—	—	—	—	—	—	—	—	—	—	—	DNF

Legend
—	Did not compete
DNF	Did not finish

=== Awards and honours ===
Brown was awarded the Order of Australia Medal (OAM) in the 2005 Australia Day Honours List.
