= Loïc Lamouller =

French cyclist

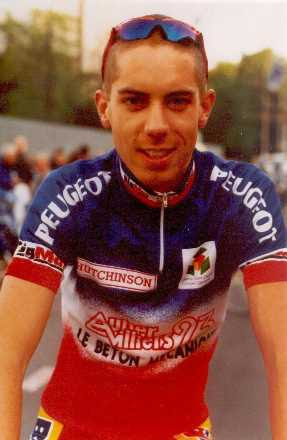

Personal information
- Born: 16 May 1978 (age 48) L'Isle-Adam, Val-d'Oise, France

Cycling career
- Sport: Cycling
- Current team: Retired
- Discipline: Road
- Role: Rider

Amateur teams
- 1991: VC Saint-Ouen l'Aumône
- 1992–1995: EC New Town 95
- 1996–1997: CM Aubervilliers 93
- 1997: BigMat–Auber 93 (stagiaire)
- 1998: BigMat–Auber 93 (stagiaire)

Professional team
- 1999–2004: BigMat–Auber 93

Loïc Lamouller (born 16 May 1978) is a French former racing cyclist. He rode in the 2001 Tour de France.

== Major results ==
1996
1st Road race, National Junior Road Championships
1998
8th Tro-Bro Léon
1999
10th Overall Tour du Poitou Charentes
2000
10th Overall Tour de Langkawi
2003
9th Tour du Jura
2004
7th Tour du Jura
