= Tour de Langkawi =

Malaysian multi-day road cycling race

- 2026 Tour de Langkawi

Race details
- Date: February–March (1996–2020); September (2023); October (2022–)
- Region: Peninsular Malaysia
- English name: Tour of Langkawi
- Discipline: Road
- Competition: UCI ProSeries
- Type: Stage race
- Organiser: Malaysian National Cycling Federation; Ministry of Youth and Sports (National Sports Council)
- Web site: www.letourdelangkawi.my

History
- First edition: 1996
- Editions: 30 (as of 2026)
- First winner: Damian McDonald (AUS)
- Most wins: Paolo Lanfranchi (ITA); José Serpa (COL) (2 wins)
- Most recent: Lennart Jasch (GER)

The Tour de Langkawi is a multiple stage bicycle race held in Malaysia. It is named after the archipelago Langkawi, where the first edition started and finished. The race has been held annually since 1996, primarily in February. Originally consists of 10 day-long segments (stages) over 10 days, the race has been reduced to eight stages over recent years. While the route changes each year, the Genting Highlands climb, the toughest in the tour, is almost always included. Tour de Langkawi is sanctioned by the International Cycling Union (UCI) as a 2.HC road race in the UCI Asia Tour calendar. The race became part of the UCI ProSeries in 2020 for a 3-year period, with the race gaining the new classification of 2.Pro. The ProSeries status were renewed by UCI in 2023 until 2025, and were again renewed by UCI in 2025 until 2028.

All stages are timed to the finish. Times for each completed stage are compounded; the rider with the lowest aggregate time is the leader of the race and gets to wear the general classification green jersey. There are other contests held within the Tour: the points classification for sprinters, the mountains classification for climbers, the Asian rider classification for Asian riders, the team classification for competing teams, and the Asian team classification for competing Asian teams.

== History ==
The Tour de Langkawi was conceived by former Malaysian Prime Minister Mahathir Mohamad to put Malaysia "on the world sporting and tourism map". The first race was held from 29 February to 9 March 1996, with the opening and ending taking place in Langkawi. It was Asia's richest bicycle race with total prize money of RM1.1 million. It attracted 21 teams from 19 countries but without the participation of the major cyclists of the world.

In 1997, the teams Mapei–GB and MG Maglificio–Technogym from Italy and the team Casino from France refused to participate in the second stage of the Tour as a protest against long delays in the delivery of their bicycles and luggage caused by insufficient numbers of cargo handlers at provincial airports in the states of Sabah and Sarawak. Organisers officially cancelled the second stage, though an unofficial shortened version was held. Since then, the race has never re-visited Sabah or Sarawak, except for the 2020 edition.

The final stage of the race was cancelled twice due to heavy rain in 2003 and 2006.

During the first stage in 2004, police allowed vehicles onto the course by mistake. Riders mutually decided to neutralise the stage.

In 2008, the Genting Highlands climb stage was replaced by Fraser's Hill. Due to 150,000 visitors converging on the Genting Highlands resort area to celebrate Chinese New Year, officials would not be able to close roads along the race route to insure the safety of riders and the public. The Genting Highlands climb stage returned to the Tour in 2009.

Due to the COVID-19 pandemic, the 2021 race that was supposed to happen between January 30 to February 6 was cancelled after initial consideration of postponement to September in the same year. The event made its return in 2022, initially scheduled from March 3 to 10 but was then postponed twice, first to June 11 to 18, then again to October 11 to 18.

The 2023 race was taken off from the UCI calendar after the UCI received complaints from teams of not receiving payments for appearance fees and flight tickets from the 2022 race. Malaysia National Cycling Federation vice president Datuk Amarjit Singh Gill said that the race will go on as scheduled and he will get a clearer picture of the situation during the world body's board meeting. In August 2023, the UCI agreed to reinstate the race in its calendar, with the National Sports Council making key changes on payments to participants from the 2023 race onwards. For the 2023 edition, the race will be held on 23 September to 30 September 2023 and the National Sport Council (MSN) will be the organiser of the event. The race involves eight stages of racing over eight days across 11 states in Peninsular Malaysia with a total distance of 1,280 kilometers.

MSN continues to organise the race for the 2024 and 2025 edition, and were given the mandate by the Malaysian government to continue as organiser for three years starting from 2026. This is despite the rumours that the organisation of the race were going to be handed to Ministry of Tourism from 2026.

There was a mooted plan to stage future races exclusively in East Malaysia (Sabah & Sarawak).

== Past winners ==
=== General classification ===
Year	Country	Rider	Team
1996	Australia	Damian McDonald	Giant–AIS
1997	Italy	Luca Scinto	MG Maglificio–Technogym
1998	Italy	Gabriele Missaglia	Mapei–Bricobi
1999	Italy	Paolo Lanfranchi	Mapei–Quick-Step
2000	United States	Chris Horner	Mercury Cycling Team
2001	Italy	Paolo Lanfranchi	Mapei–Quick-Step
2002	Colombia	Hernán Darío Muñoz	Colombia–Selle Italia
2003	United States	Tom Danielson	Saturn Cycling Team
2004	Colombia	Fredy González	Colombia–Selle Italia
2005	South Africa	Ryan Cox	Barloworld
2006	South Africa	David George	South Africa (national team)
2007	France	Anthony Charteau	Crédit Agricole
2008	Moldova	Ruslan Ivanov	Diquigiovanni–Androni
2009	Colombia	José Serpa	Diquigiovanni–Androni
2010	Venezuela	José Rujano	Androni Giocattoli
2011	Venezuela	Jonathan Monsalve	Androni Giocattoli
2012	Colombia	José Serpa	Androni Giocattoli–Venezuela
2013	Colombia	Julián Arredondo	Team Nippo–De Rosa
2014	Iran	Samad Pourseyedi	Tabriz Petrochemical Team
2015	Algeria	Youcef Reguigui	MTN–Qhubeka
2016	South Africa	Reinardt Janse van Rensburg	Team Dimension Data
2017	South Africa	Ryan Gibbons	Team Dimension Data
2018	Russia	Artem Ovechkin	Terengganu Cycling Team
2019	Australia	Benjamin Dyball	Team Sapura Cycling
2020	Italy	Danilo Celano	Team Sapura Cycling
2021	No race due to COVID-19 pandemic		
2022	Colombia	Iván Sosa	Movistar Team
2023	Great Britain	Simon Carr	EF Education–EasyPost
2024	Great Britain	Max Poole	Team dsm–firmenich PostNL
2025	France	Joris Delbove	Team TotalEnergies
2026	Germany	Lennart Jasch	Tudor Pro Cycling Team

=== Points classification ===
Year	Country	Rider	Team
1996	Australia	Damian McDonald	Giant–AIS
1997	Italy	Luca Scinto	MG Maglificio–Technogym
1998	United States	Fred Rodriguez	Saturn Cycling Team
1999	New Zealand	Graeme Miller	New Zealand (national team)
2000	Canada	Gordon Fraser	Mercury Cycling Team
2001	Italy	Paolo Bettini	Mapei–Quick-Step
2002	South Africa	Robert Hunter	Mapei–Quick-Step
2003	Australia	Graeme Brown	Ceramiche Panaria–Fiordo
2004	Canada	Gordon Fraser	Health Net–Maxxis
2005	Australia	Graeme Brown	Ceramica Panaria–Navigare
2006	Germany	Steffen Radochla	Wiesenhof–AKUD
2007	Italy	Alberto Loddo	Diquigiovanni–Selle Italia
2008	Switzerland	Aurélien Clerc	Bouygues Télécom
2009	Italy	Mattia Gavazzi	Diquigiovanni–Androni
2010	Malaysia	Anuar Manan	Geumsan Ginseng Asia
2011	Italy	Andrea Guardini	Farnese Vini–Neri Sottoli
2012	Italy	Andrea Guardini	Farnese Vini–Selle Italia
2013	Italy	Francesco Chicchi	Vini Fantini–Selle Italia
2014	Lithuania	Aidis Kruopis	Orica–GreenEDGE
2015	Australia	Caleb Ewan	Orica–GreenEDGE
2016	Italy	Andrea Guardini	Astana
2017	South Africa	Ryan Gibbons	Team Dimension Data
2018	Italy	Andrea Guardini	Bardiani–CSF
2019	United States	Travis McCabe	Floyd's Pro Cycling
2020	Germany	Max Walscheid	NTT Pro Cycling
2021	No race due to COVID-19 pandemic		
2022	Norway	Erlend Blikra	Uno-X Pro Cycling Team
2023	Netherlands	Arvid de Kleijn	Tudor Pro Cycling Team
2024	Italy	Matteo Malucelli	JCL Team UKYO
2025	Norway	Erlend Blikra	Uno-X Mobility
2026	Italy	Matteo Malucelli	XDS Astana Team

=== Mountains classification ===
Year	Country	Rider	Team
1996	Great Britain	Chris Newton	Great Britain (National Team)
1997	Italy	Luca Scinto	MG Maglificio–Technogym
1998	South Africa	Douglas Ryder	South Africa (national team)
1999	Italy	Alessandro Petacchi	Navigare–Gaerne
2000	Mexico	Julio Alberto Pérez	Ceramica Panaria–Gaerne
2001	Italy	Paolo Lanfranchi	Mapei–Quick-Step
2002	Colombia	Ruber Marín	Colombia–Selle Italia
2003	Canada	Roland Green	Canada (national team)
2004	Colombia	Ruber Marín	Colombia–Selle Italia
2005	South Africa	Ryan Cox	Barloworld
2006	South Africa	David George	South Africa (national team)
2007	Colombia	Walter Pedraza	Diquigiovanni–Selle Italia
2008	Italy	Filippo Savini	CSF Group–Navigare
2009	Colombia	José Serpa	Diquigiovanni–Androni
2010	Australia	Peter McDonald	Drapac–Porsche Cycling
2011	Venezuela	Jonathan Monsalve	Androni Giocattoli
2012	Colombia	José Serpa	Androni Giocattoli–Venezuela
2013	China	Wang Meiyin	Hengxiang Cycling Team
2014	Ireland	Matt Brammeier	Synergy Baku
2015	United States	Kiel Reijnen	UnitedHealthcare
2016	China	Wang Meiyin	Wisdom–Hengxiang Cycling Team
2017	Denmark	John Ebsen	Infinite AIS Cycling Team
2018	Colombia	Álvaro Duarte	Forca Amskins Racing
2019	Australia	Angus Lyons	Oliver's Real Food Racing
2020	Malaysia	Muhamad Nur Aiman Mohd Zariff	Team Sapura Cycling
2021	No race due to COVID-19 pandemic		
2022	Malaysia	Muhamad Nur Aiman Mohd Zariff	Terengganu Polygon Cycling Team
2023	Switzerland	Simon Pellaud	Tudor Pro Cycling Team
2024	Spain	Mario Aparicio	Burgos BH
2025	Australia	Patrick Eddy	Team Picnic–PostNL
2026	Germany	Lennart Jasch	Tudor Pro Cycling Team

=== Asian rider classification ===
Year	Country	Rider	Team
1998	Indonesia	Tonton Susanto	Indonesia (national team)
1999	Japan	Hideto Yukinari	Japan (national team)
2000	Hong Kong	Wong Kam-po	Telekom Malaysia Cycling Team
2001	Hong Kong	Wong Kam-po	Telekom Malaysia Cycling Team
2002	Indonesia	Tonton Susanto	Telekom Malaysia Cycling Team
2003	Japan	Tomoya Kano	Japan (national team)
2004	Iran	Ghader Mizbani	Iran (national team)
2005	Japan	Koji Fukushima	Bridgestone-Anchor
2006	Iran	Hossein Askari	Giant Asia Racing Team
2007	Iran	Ghader Mizbani	Giant Asia Racing Team
2008	Japan	Shinichi Fukushima	Meitan Hompo-GDR
2009	Indonesia	Tonton Susanto	LeTua Cycling Team
2010	South Korea	Gong Hyo-Suk	Seoul Cycling Team
2011	Iran	Rahim Emami	Azad University Iran
2012	Kazakhstan	Alexsandr Dyachenko	Astana
2013	China	Wang Meiyin	Hengxiang Cycling Team
2014	Iran	Samad Pourseyedi	Tabriz Petrochemical Team
2015	Japan	Tomohiro Hayakawa	Aisan Racing Team
2016	Malaysia	Adiq Husainie Othman	Terengganu Cycling Team
2017	Japan	Hideto Nakane	Nippo–Vini Fantini
2018	Kazakhstan	Yevgeniy Gidich	Astana
2019	Kazakhstan	Vadim Pronskiy	Astana City
2020	Kazakhstan	Yevgeniy Fedorov	Vino–Astana Motors
2021	No race due to COVID-19 pandemic		
2022	Mongolia	Sainbayaryn Jambaljamts	Terengganu Polygon Cycling Team
2023	Kazakhstan	Vadim Pronskiy	Astana Qazaqstan Team
2024	Japan	Manabu Ishibashi	JCL Team UKYO
2025	Kazakhstan	Nicolas Vinokurov	XDS Astana Team
2026	Japan	Yuhi Todome	Aisan Racing Team

=== Team classification ===
Year	Based	Team name
1996	(Australia)	Giant–AIS
1997	(Italy)	MG Maglificio–Technogym
1998	(Italy)	Mapei–Bricobi
1999	(Italy)	Mapei–Quick-Step
2000	(United States)	Mercury Cycling Team
2001	(Italy)	Mapei–Quick-Step
2002	(Italy)	Mapei–Quick-Step
2003	(Colombia)	Colombia–Selle Italia
2004	(United Kingdom)	Barloworld
2005	(United Kingdom)	Barloworld
2006	(Colombia)	Selle Italia–Diquigiovanni
2007	(Chinese Taipei)	Giant Asia Racing Team
2008	(Venezuela)	Diquigiovanni–Androni
2009	(Venezuela)	Diquigiovanni–Androni
2010	(Iran)	Tabriz Petrochemical Team
2011	(Iran)	Tabriz Petrochemical Team
2012	(Italy)	Androni Giocattoli–Venezuela
2013	(South Africa)	MTN–Qhubeka
2014	(South Africa)	MTN–Qhubeka
2015	(Indonesia)	Pegasus Continental Cycling Team
2016	(United States)	UnitedHealthcare
2017	(Australia)	IsoWhey Sports SwissWellness
2018	(Italy)	Wilier Triestina–Selle Italia
2019	(Canada)	Floyd's Pro Cycling
2020	(Malaysia)	Team Sapura Cycling
2021	No race due to COVID-19 pandemic	
2022	(Spain)	Movistar Team
2023	(United States)	EF Education–EasyPost
2024	(Spain)	Equipo Kern Pharma
2025	(Italy)	Team Polti VisitMalta
2026	(Spain)	Caja Rural–Seguros RGA

=== Asian team classification ===
Year	Based	Team name
1998	(Philippines)	Philippines (national team)
1999	(Malaysia)	Malaysia (national team)
2000	(Japan)	Japan (national team)
2001	(Malaysia)	Telekom Malaysia Cycling Team
2002	(Malaysia)	Telekom Malaysia Cycling Team
2003	(Iran)	Iran (national team)
2004	(Iran)	Iran (national team)
2005	(Iran)	Iran (national team)
2006	(Japan)	Japan (national team)
2007	(Chinese Taipei)	Giant Asia Racing Team
2008	(South Korea)	Seoul Cycling Team
2009	(Iran)	Iran (national team)
2010	(Iran)	Tabriz Petrochemical Team
2011	(Iran)	Tabriz Petrochemical Team
2012	(Kazakhstan)	Astana
2013	(Iran)	Tabriz Petrochemical Team
2014	(Iran)	Tabriz Petrochemical Team
2015	(Indonesia)	Pegasus Continental Cycling Team
2016	(China)	Wisdom–Hengxiang Cycling Team
2017	(Kazakhstan)	Vino–Astana Motors
2018	(Kazakhstan)	Astana
2019	(Kazakhstan)	Vino–Astana Motors
2020	(Malaysia)	Team Sapura Cycling
2021	No race due to COVID-19 pandemic	
2022	(Malaysia)	Terengganu Polygon Cycling Team
2023	(Thailand)	Roojai Online Insurance
2024	(Japan)	JCL Team UKYO
2025	(Indonesia)	Nusantara–BYC Cycling Team
2026	(Malaysia)	Terengganu Cycling Team

== Sponsor ==
- Telekom Malaysia
- Petronas
- Genting Malaysia
- Maju Group
- BSN
- Altel
- Terengganu
- Proton Holdings
- Tourism Malaysia
- DRB-HICOM
