= Nokere Koerse =

Belgian one-day road cycling race

Race details
- Date: Late March
- Region: Flanders, Belgium
- English name: Nokere Koerse
- Local name: Nokere Koerse (in Dutch)
- Discipline: Road
- Competition: UCI ProSeries; UCI Women's ProSeries
- Type: One-day race
- Web site: www.nokerekoerse.be

Men's history
- First edition: 1944
- Editions: 80 (as of 2026)
- First winner: Marcel Kint (BEL)
- Most wins: Hendrik Van Dijck (BEL); Tim Merlier (BEL) (3 wins)
- Most recent: Jasper Philipsen (BEL)

Women's history
- First edition: 2019
- Editions: 7 (as of 2026)
- First winner: Lorena Wiebes (NED)
- Most wins: Lotte Kopecky (BEL) (3 wins)
- Most recent: Lotte Kopecky (BEL)

Nokere Koerse is a European semi classic single day cycle race held in the Belgian region of Flanders.

The Nokere Koerse was created in 1944, initially as the Grand Prix Jules Lowie in honour of 1938 Paris–Nice winner Jules Lowie who was born in Nokere. From 2005 to 2015, the race was organized as a 1.1 event on the UCI Europe Tour, and starting in 2016 it was upgraded to a 1.HC event. Since 2021, the race has been part of the UCI ProSeries. The 2013 edition of the race is counted as an edition by the organisation as it was fully organised but cancelled due to bad winter weather on the day (hence only 78 winners for 79 editions in the table below), and the 2020 edition of the race was cancelled owing to the COVID-19 pandemic.

Since 2019, a women's edition of Nokere Koerse is held on the same day as the men's race, starting and finishing in the same location. In 2021, this race joined the UCI Women's ProSeries. Since 2016, a junior edition of the race has also been held.

Only five cyclists not born in Belgium or the Netherlands have won the men's race, with only Belgian and Dutch riders and one lone Polish rider having won the women's race.

== Winners (men) ==
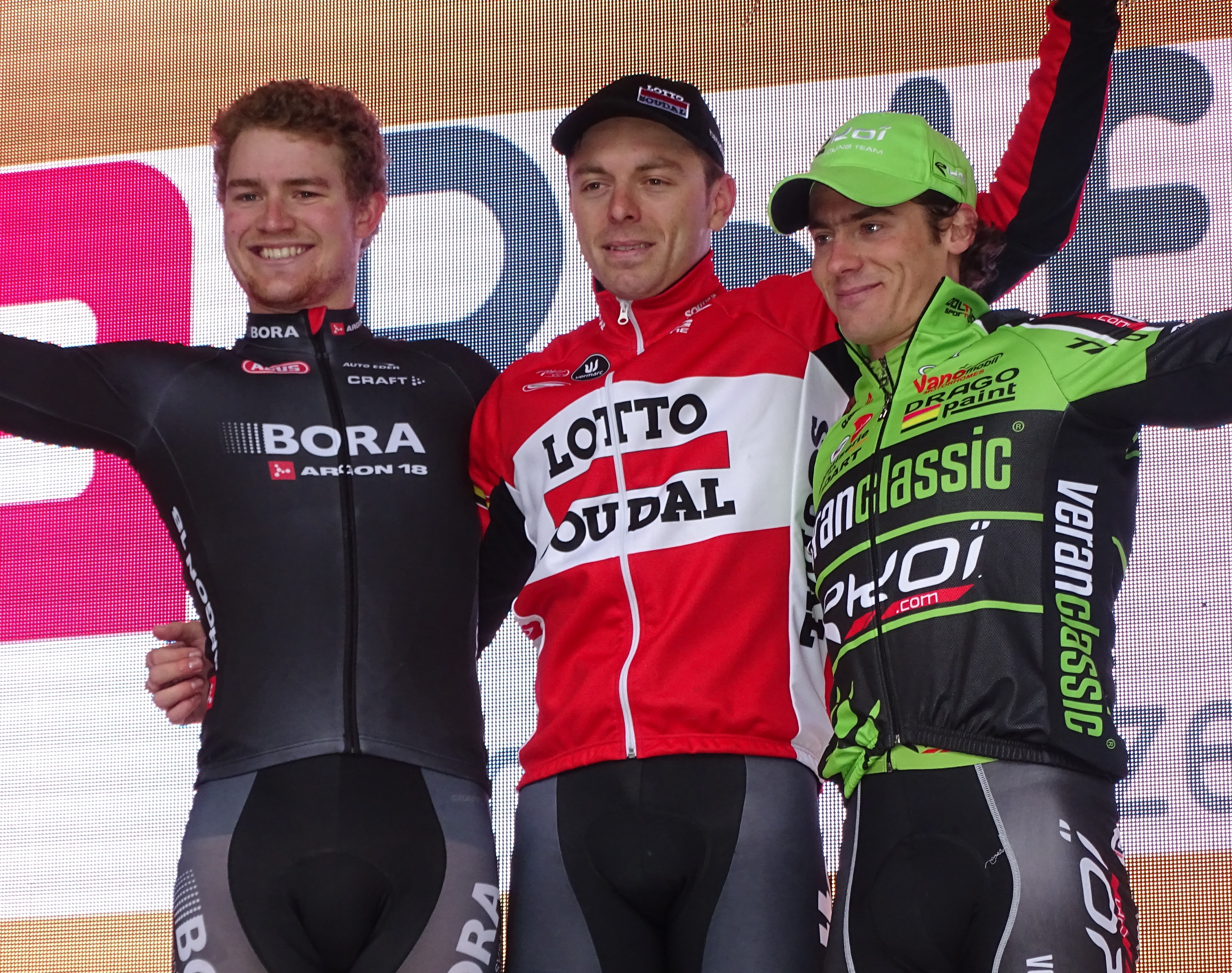
The 2015 podium (from left to right): Scott Thwaites, Kris Boeckmans and Justin Jules.

Year	Country	Rider	Team
1944	Belgium	Marcel Kint	Mercier–Hutchinson
1945	Belgium	Briek Schotte	Groene Leeuw
1946	Belgium	Emmanuel Thoma	Starnord
1947	Belgium	Albert Sercu	Bertin–Wolber
1948	Belgium	Roger Cnockaert	Celta
1949	Belgium	Ernest Sterckx	Alcyon–Dunlop
1950	Belgium	Jules Depoorter	Dardenne
1951	Belgium	Gerard Buyl	Dossche Sport
1952	Netherlands	Wim van Est	Locomotief–Wego
1953	Belgium	Basiel Wambeke	Girardengo
1954	Belgium	Jan Zagers	Girardengo–Eldorado
1955	Belgium	Jozef Schils	Girardengo–Eldorado
1956	Belgium	Marcel Rijckaert	Dossche Sport
1957	Belgium	André Auquier	Rochet–Dunlop
1958	Belgium	Arthur Decabooter	Groene Leeuw–Leopold
1959	No race		
1960	Belgium	Gilbert Desmet	Carpano
1961	Belgium	Leon Vandaele	Wiel's–Flandria
1962	No race		
1963	Belgium	Frans De Mulder	Wiel's–Groene Leeuw
1964	Belgium	Robert De Middeleir	Mercier–BP–Hutchinson
1965	Belgium	Arthur Decabooter	Wiel's–Groene Leeuw
1966	Belgium	Jacques De Boever	Wiel's–Groene Leeuw
1967	Belgium	Walter Godefroot	Flandria–De Clerck
1968	Belgium	Frans Brands	Smiths
1969	Belgium	Roger Rosiers	Mann–Grundig
1970	Belgium	André Dierickx	Flandria–Mars
1971	Belgium	Herman Van Springel	Molteni
1972	Belgium	Tony Houbrechts	Salvarani
1973	Belgium	Noël Vantyghem	Flandria–Carpenter–Shimano
1974	Belgium	Freddy Maertens	Carpenter–Confortluxe–Flandria
1975	Belgium	Marc Demeyer	Carpenter–Confortluxe–Flandria
1976	Belgium	Luc Leman	Miko–de Gribaldy–Superia
1977	Belgium	Frans Van Looy	Maes–Mini Flat
1978	Belgium	Gustaaf Van Roosbroeck	IJsboerke–Gios
1979	Belgium	Hendrik Devos	Flandria–Ça va seul
1980	Belgium	Jos Van De Poel	IJsboerke–Warncke
1981	Netherlands	Gerrie Knetemann	TI–Raleigh
1982	Belgium	William Tackaert	DAF Trucks
1983	Belgium	Walter Schoonjans	Vorselaars Autoschade
1984	Belgium	Jan Bogaert	Dries–Verandalux
1985	Belgium	Diederik Foubert	Safir–Van de Ven
1986	Belgium	Luc Colijn	Fangio–AD Renting
1987	Belgium	Etienne De Wilde	Sigma
1988	Belgium	Patrick Versluys	Intral Renting–Merckx
1989	Belgium	Rik Van Slycke	Histor–Sigma
1990	Belgium	Herman Frison	Histor–Sigma
1991	Belgium	Koen Van Rooy	La William–Saltos
1992	Belgium	Johan Capiot	TVM–Sanyo
1993	Netherlands	Michel Cornelisse	La William–Duvel
1994	Belgium	Peter De Clercq	Lotto
1995	Belgium	Jo Planckaert	Collstrop–Lystex
1996	Belgium	Hendrik Van Dijck	TVM–Farm Frites
1997	Belgium	Hendrik Van Dijck	TVM–Farm Frites
1998	Australia	Scott Sunderland	Palmans–Ideal
1999	Netherlands	Jeroen Blijlevens	TVM–Farm Frites
2000	Belgium	Hendrik Van Dijck	Palmans–Ideal
2001	Belgium	Michel Vanhaecke	Landbouwkrediet–Colnago
2002	Switzerland	Aurélien Clerc	Mapei–Quick-Step
2003	Netherlands	Matthé Pronk	BankGiroLoterij
2004	Netherlands	Max van Heeswijk	U.S. Postal Service
2005	Netherlands	Steven de Jongh	Rabobank
2006	Belgium	Bert Roesems	Davitamon–Lotto
2007	Netherlands	Leon van Bon	Rabobank
2008	Belgium	Wouter Weylandt	Quick-Step
2009	Australia	Graeme Brown	Rabobank
2010	Belgium	Jens Keukeleire	Cofidis
2011	Belgium	Gert Steegmans	Quick-Step
2012	Italy	Francesco Chicchi	Omega Pharma–Quick-Step
2013	No race due to snow		
2014	Belgium	Kenny Dehaes	Lotto–Belisol
2015	Belgium	Kris Boeckmans	Lotto–Soudal
2016	Belgium	Timothy Dupont	Verandas Willems
2017	France	Nacer Bouhanni	Cofidis
2018	Netherlands	Fabio Jakobsen	Quick-Step Floors
2019	Netherlands	Cees Bol	Team Sunweb
2020	No race due to COVID-19 pandemic		
2021	Belgium	Ludovic Robeet	Bingoal WB
2022	Belgium	Tim Merlier	Alpecin–Fenix
2023	Belgium	Tim Merlier	Soudal–Quick-Step
2024	Belgium	Tim Merlier	Soudal–Quick-Step
2025	Netherlands	Nils Eekhoff	Team Picnic–PostNL
2026	Belgium	Jasper Philipsen	Alpecin–Premier Tech

=== Wins per country ===
Wins	Country
63	Belgium
11	Netherlands
2	Australia
1	Italy; Switzerland; France

=== Junior race ===
Since 2016 a junior edition of the race has existed.

Year	Country	Rider	Team
2016	Belgium	Arne Marit	Van Den Hauwe–Gentse VS
2017	Belgium	Arne Marit	Van Den Hauwe–Nucci
2018	Belgium	Ilan Van Wilder	
2019	Great Britain	Alex Haines	HMT Hospitals Giant CT
2020–2021	No race due to COVID-19 pandemic		
2022	Belgium	Jarno Widar	Crabbe Toitures–CC Chevigny U19
2023	Great Britain	Jed Smithson	Fensham Howes-MAS Design
2024	Great Britain	Seb Grindley	Fensham Howes-MAS Design
2025	Belgium	Thor Michielsen	Avia-Rudyco Cycling Team

== Winners (women) ==
Year	Country	Rider	Team
2019	Netherlands	Lorena Wiebes	Parkhotel Valkenburg
2020	No race due to COVID-19 pandemic		
2021	Netherlands	Amy Pieters	SD Worx
2022	Netherlands	Lorena Wiebes	Team DSM
2023	Belgium	Lotte Kopecky	SD Worx
2024	Belgium	Lotte Kopecky	Team SD Worx–Protime
2025	Poland	Marta Lach	Team SD Worx–Protime
2026	Belgium	Lotte Kopecky	Team SD Worx–Protime

=== Wins per country ===
Wins	Country
3	Netherlands; Belgium
1	Poland
