= Telekom Malaysia Cycling Team =

Team information
- Registered: Malaysia
- Founded: 2000
- Discipline: Road
- Status: UCI Continental Team

Telekom Malaysia Cycling Team is an Invitational Continental Team cycling team based in the Kuala Lumpur, Malaysia. The team are founded to participate in the Tour de Langkawi. Telekom Malaysia Cycling Team's most prominent rider is Hong Kong's Wong Kam-po. The team's title sponsor is Telekom Malaysia, which is the largest telecommunication company in Malaysia.

== Squad ==
Nationality & Riders	Tour de Langkawi (Tours Participated)	Achievements
Graeme Miller	2000, 2001 & 2002	2000 Tour de Langkawi – 54th in General Classifications (Yellow Jersey) & 30th in Points (Sprint) Classifications (Green Jersey); 2001 Tour de Langkawi – 34th in General Classifications (Yellow Jersey) & 8th in Points (Sprint) Classifications (Green Jersey); 2002 Tour de Langkawi – 112th in General Classifications (Yellow Jersey) & 38th in Points (Sprint) Classifications (Green Jersey)
Glen Mitchell (New Zealand cyclist)	2000	2000 Tour de Langkawi – 69th in General Classifications (Yellow Jersey) & 46th in Points (Sprint) Classifications (Green Jersey)
Wong Kam-po	2000, 2001, 2002 & 2003	2000 Tour de Langkawi – 20th in General Classifications (Yellow Jersey), 37th in Points (Sprint) Classifications (Green Jersey), 5th in Mountain Classifications (Red Polka-Dot Jersey) & 1st in Best Asian Riders Classifications (Blue Jersey); 2001 Tour de Langkawi – 24th in General Classifications (Yellow Jersey) & 1st in Best Asian Riders Classifications (Blue Jersey); 2002 Tour de Langkawi – 27th in General Classifications (Yellow Jersey), 17th in Points (Sprint) Classifications (Green Jersey), 6th in Mountain Classifications (Red Polka-Dot Jersey) & 3rd in Best Asian Riders Classifications (Blue Jersey); 2003 Tour de Langkawi – 94th in General Classifications (Yellow Jersey) & 20th in Best Asian Riders Classifications (Blue Jersey)
Nor Effandy Rosli	2000, 2002 & 2003	2000 Tour de Langkawi – 60th in General Classifications (Yellow Jersey) & 12th in Best Asian Riders Classifications (Blue Jersey); 2002 Tour de Langkawi – 64th in General Classifications (Yellow Jersey) & 9th in Best Asian Riders Classifications (Blue Jersey); 2003 Tour de Langkawi – 73rd in General Classifications (Yellow Jersey) & 15th in Best Asian Riders Classifications (Blue Jersey)
John Talen	2000	2000 Tour de Langkawi – 85th in General Classifications (Yellow Jersey) & 64th in Points (Sprint) Classifications (Green Jersey)
Franky Van Haesebroucke	2000	2000 Tour de Langkawi – 100th in General Classifications (Yellow Jersey) & 6th in Points (Sprint) Classifications (Green Jersey)
Victor Espiritu	2001	2001 Tour de Langkawi – 33rd in General Classifications (Yellow Jersey) & 5th in Best Asian Riders Classifications (Blue Jersey)
Ghader Mizbani Iranagh	2001, 2002 & 2003	2001 Tour de Langkawi – 25th in General Classifications (Yellow Jersey), 22nd in Mountain Classifications (Red Polka-Dot Jersey) & 2nd in Best Asian Riders Classifications (Blue Jersey); 2002 Tour de Langkawi – 32nd in General Classifications (Yellow Jersey), 71st in Points (Sprint) Classifications (Green Jersey), 21st in Mountain Classifications (Red Polka-Dot Jersey) & 4th in Best Asian Riders Classifications (Blue Jersey); 2003 Tour de Langkawi – 34th in General Classifications (Yellow Jersey) & 4th in Best Asian Riders Classifications (Blue Jersey)
Amir Zargari	2001	2001 Tour de Langkawi – 72nd in General Classifications (Yellow Jersey), 47th in Points (Sprint) Classifications (Green Jersey), 9th in Mountain Classifications (Red Polka-Dot Jersey) & 12th in Best Asian Riders Classifications (Blue Jersey)
Björnar Vestöl	2001	2001 Tour de Langkawi – 78th in General Classifications (Yellow Jersey)
Mohamad Fauzi Shafihi	1996,1998, 2001 & 2002	1998 Tour de Langkawi – 95th in General Classifications (Yellow Jersey), 4th in Mountain Classifications (Red Polka-Dot Jersey) 11th in Best Asian Riders Classifications (Blue Jersey) 2001 Tour de Langkawi – 69th in General Classifications (Yellow Jersey) & 11th in Best Asian Riders Classifications (Blue Jersey); 2002 Tour de Langkawi – 49th in General Classifications (Yellow Jersey) & 10th in Best Asian Riders Classifications (Blue Jersey)
Ahad Kazemi	2002	2002 Tour de Langkawi – 90th in General Classifications (Yellow Jersey) & 14th in Best Asian Riders Classifications (Blue Jersey)
Tonton Susanto	2002 & 2003	2002 Tour de Langkawi – 15th in General Classifications (Yellow Jersey), 51st in Points (Sprint) Classifications (Green Jersey) & 1st in Best Asian Riders Classifications (Blue Jersey); 2003 Tour de Langkawi – 20th in General Classifications (Yellow Jersey) & 2nd in Best Asian Riders Classifications (Blue Jersey)
Thomas Evans	2003	2003 Tour de Langkawi – 118th in General Classifications (Yellow Jersey), 19th in Points (Sprint) Classifications (Green Jersey) & 10th in Mountain Classifications (Red Polka-Dot Jersey)
Tsen Seong Hoong	2003	2003 Tour de Langkawi – 69th in General Classifications (Yellow Jersey) & 14th in Best Asian Riders Classifications (Blue Jersey)
Simone Mori	2003	2003 Tour de Langkawi – ???? in General Classifications (Yellow Jersey)

=== Team achievements ===
Riders

Race	Riders	Achievements
2000 Tour de Langkawi	(Wong Kam-po)	20th in General Classifications (Yellow Jersey), 5th in Mountain Classifications (Red Polka-Dot Jersey) & 1st in Best Asian Riders Classifications (Blue Jersey)
	(Franky van Haesebroucke)	100th in General Classifications (Yellow Jersey) & 6th in Points (Sprint) Classifications (Green Jersey)
2001 Tour de Langkawi	(Wong Kam-po)	24th in General Classifications (Yellow Jersey) & 1st in Best Asian Riders Classifications (Blue Jersey)
	(Graeme Miller)	34th in General Classifications (Yellow Jersey) & 8th in Points (Sprint) Classifications (Green Jersey)
	(Amir Zargari)	72nd in General Classifications (Yellow Jersey) & 9th in Mountain Classifications (Red Polka-Dot Jersey)
2002 Tour de Langkawi	(Tonton Susanto)	15th in General Classifications (Yellow Jersey) & 1st in Best Asian Riders Classifications (Blue Jersey)
	(Wong Kam-po)	27th in General Classifications (Yellow Jersey), 17th in Points (Sprint) Classifications (Green Jersey) & 6th in Mountain Classifications (Red Polka-Dot Jersey)
2003 Tour de Langkawi	(Tonton Susanto)	20th in General Classifications (Yellow Jersey) & 2nd in Best Asian Riders Classifications (Blue Jersey)
	(Thomas Evans)	118th in General Classifications (Yellow Jersey), 19th in Points (Sprint) Classifications (Green Jersey) & 10th in Mountain Classifications (Red Polka-Dot Jersey)

Team

Tours	Achievements
2000 Tour de Langkawi	13th in Team General Classifications & 2nd in Asian Team Overall Classifications
2001 Tour de Langkawi	7th in Team General Classifications & 1st in Asian Team Overall Classifications
2002 Tour de Langkawi	7th in Team General Classifications & 1st in Asian Team Overall Classifications
2003 Tour de Langkawi	16th in Team General Classifications & 3rd in Asian Team Overall Classifications
