= Lennie Kristensen =

Danish cyclist

Personal information
- Born: 16 May 1968 (age 58) Silkeborg, Denmark

Cycling career
- Sport: Cycling
- Current team: Retired
- Disciplines: Road, mountain bike
- Role: Rider

Amateur team
- 1995–1997: Team Giant

Professional teams
- 1999–2002: Team Fakta
- 2003: Team CSC

Lennie Kristensen (born 16 May 1968) is a Danish former professional cyclist. He competed in the men's cross-country mountain biking event at the 1996 Summer Olympics.

== Major results ==
=== Road ===
1991
10th Overall Tour of Sweden
1999
1st Stage 1a (ITT) Tour de Langkawi
2000
1st Stage 4 Tour de Normandie
5th Overall Danmark Rundt
6th Overall Tour de Langkawi
8th Overall Tour de Luxembourg
2002
2nd Time trial, National Road Championships
2nd Grand Prix de Wallonie
2nd Rund um die Hainleite
4th Overall Tour of Austria
4th Paris–Camembert
8th Rund um Düren
10th Overall Tour de Luxembourg
10th Classique des Alpes
2003
2nd Overall Tour Down Under

=== Mountain ===
1992
1st Cross-country, National Mountain Bike Championships
1994
3rd Cross-country, National Mountain Bike Championships
1996
3rd Cross-country, National Mountain Bike Championships
1997
1st Cross-country, European Mountain Bike Championships
2nd Cross-country, National Mountain Bike Championships
1999
3rd Cross-country, National Mountain Bike Championships
