= Hernán Darío Muñoz =

Colombian racing cyclist

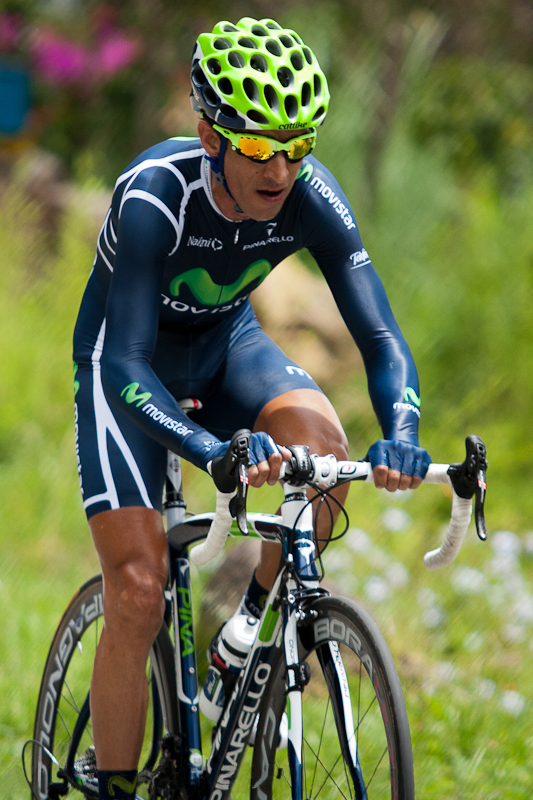

Personal information
- Full name: Hernán Darío Muñoz Giraldo
- Born: 5 January 1973 (age 53) Rionegro, Antioquia, Colombia

Cycling career
- Sport: Cycling
- Current team: Retired
- Discipline: Road
- Role: Rider

Amateur teams
- 1999: Tucanes–Banco de Costa Rica
- 2004: Orbitel Colombia
- 2006: Canels Turbo–Chocolate Mayordomo
- 2007: Gobernación Zulia Bod
- 2009: UNE–EPM

Professional teams
- 2000–2001: Colchon Relax–Fuenlabrada
- 2002–2003: Colombia–Selle Italia
- 2010: EPM–UNE
- 2011: Movistar Continental Team

Hernán Darío Muñoz Giraldo (born January 5, 1973) is a Colombian former professional road cyclist.

== Major results ==
1997
2nd Overall Vuelta a Venezuela

1st Stage 9

3rd Overall Vuelta al Táchira

1st Stages 10b & 12

1998
1st Overall Clásica Nacional Marco Fidel Suárez
1st Overall Vuelta a Chiriquí
1st Overall Vuelta a Costa Rica
1st Stage 7 Vuelta al Táchira
1st Stage 2 Clásico RCN
2nd Road race, National Road Championships
1999
1st Overall Clasica Alcaldía de Pasca
1st Overall Vuelta a Antioquia
2002
1st Overall Tour de Langkawi

1st Stage 9

1st Stage 12 Vuelta a Colombia
2003
1st Overall Vuelta al Táchira

1st Stages 8 & 13

2nd Overall Tour de Langkawi

1st Stage 9

2004
1st Overall Clasica Ciclo Acosta-Bello

1st Prologue

1st Stage 3 (TTT) Doble Copacabana GP Fides
2nd Overall Vuelta a Cundinamarca
2005
1st Overall Vuelta al Tolima

1st Stage 3

2006
1st Overall Vuelta a Uraba

1st Stage 3

1st Overall Vuelta Mazatlán

1st Stage 3

1st Overall Vuelta a Puebla

1st Stage 2

2nd Overall Vuelta a Guatemala
2007
1st Stage 2 Tour of the Gila
2nd Overall Vuelta de Bisbee

1st Stage 3

3rd Overall Tucson Bicycle Classic
2009
1st Stage 2 Vuelta a Antioquia
2nd Cham-Hagendorn
