= Ruber Marín =

Colombian cyclist

Personal information
- Full name: Ruber Albeiro Marín Valencia
- Born: June 7, 1968 (age 58) Argelia, Valle del Cauca, Colombia

Cycling career
- Sport: Cycling
- Discipline: Road
- Role: Rider

Professional teams
- 1992–1996: Postobón
- 2000–2004: Aguardiente Néctar–Selle Italia
Medal record
Representing Colombia
Pan American Games
Gold medal – first place	1991 Havana	Road time trial team
Central American and Caribbean Games
Gold medal – first place	1990 Mexico City	Road time trial team

Ruber Albeiro Marín Valencia (born June 7, 1968, in Argelia, Valle del Cauca) is a Colombian cyclist who competed in the 1996 and 2000 Summer Olympics.

== Major results ==
1991
1st Stage 1 Vuelta a Colombia
1992
Vuelta a Colombia

1st Stages 1 & 7

1993
Clásico RCN

1st Stages 2 & 3

10th Overall Vuelta a Colombia

1st Stages 4 & 9

1994
1st Stage 10 Vuelta a Colombia
1995
1st Stage 1 Vuelta a Colombia
1st Stage 9 Clásico RCN
1999
1st Stage 3 Vuelta a Colombia
2000
1st Stage 13 Vuelta a Colombia
1st Stage 10 Vuelta al Táchira
2002
9th Overall Tour de Langkawi
2003
1st Stage 6 Vuelta al Táchira
9th Overall Tour de Langkawi
2004
6th Overall Tour de Langkawi

1st Stage 9
