= Gert Vanderaerden =

Belgian former road cyclist (born 1973)

Personal information
- Born: 23 January 1973 (age 53) Herk-de-Stad, Belgium

Cycling career
- Sport: Cycling
- Current team: Retired
- Discipline: Road
- Role: Rider

Amateur team
- 1995: Palmans–Ipso (stagiaire)

Professional teams
- 1996–2000: Palmans–Boghemans
- 2001: Vlaanderen–T Interim
- 2002–2003: Palmans–Collstrop
- 2004: Mr. Bookmaker–Palmans–Collstrop
- 2006: Yawadoo–Colba–ABM
- 2007: DFL–Cyclingnews–Litespeed

Gert Vanderaerden (born 23 January 1973) is a Belgian former road cyclist, who competed as a professional from 1996 to 2007. His older brother Eric was also a professional cyclist.

== Major results ==
1995
3rd Internationale Wielertrofee Jong Maar Moedig
3rd Liège–Bastogne–Liège U23
10th Nationale Sluitingprijs
1996
1st Overall Coca-Cola Trophy
1st Stage 2 Tour of Austria
7th GP Rik Van Steenbergen
1997
9th Schaal Sels
1998
1st Omloop van de Vlaamse Scheldeboorden
3rd Omloop van de Westhoek
5th Nationale Sluitingprijs
9th Kampioenschap van Vlaanderen
1999
2nd GP Stad Zottegem
3rd Grote Prijs Jef Scherens
4th GP Rik Van Steenbergen
5th Paris–Brussels
2000
3rd Brussels–Ingooigem
4th Schaal Sels
2001
4th Schaal Sels
4th Grote Prijs Jef Scherens
2002
2nd Omloop van het Waasland
3rd Road race, National Road Championships
4th Vlaamse Pijl
10th Kampioenschap van Vlaanderen
10th GP Stad Zottegem
2003
2nd Le Samyn
2nd Grote 1-MeiPrijs
6th GP de Fourmies
10th Ronde van Midden-Zeeland
10th Sparkassen Giro Bochum
2004
1st Circuito de Getxo
7th Rund um die Nürnberger Altstadt
2005
1st Internationale Wielertrofee Jong Maar Moedig
