= Fortunato Baliani =

Italian former road racing cyclist

Personal information
- Full name: Fortunato Baliani
- Born: 6 July 1974 (age 52) Foligno, Italy

Cycling career
- Sport: Cycling
- Discipline: Road
- Role: Rider

Professional teams
- 1998–2002: Kross–Selle Italia
- 2003: Formaggi Pinzolo Fiavè
- 2004–2009: Ceramica Panaria–Margres
- 2010: Miche
- 2011–2013: D'Angelo & Antenucci–Nippo
- 2014: Christina Watches–Dana

Fortunato Baliani (born 6 July 1974 in Foligno) is an Italian former road racing cyclist, who competed professionally between 1998 and 2014.

== Palmares ==
1992
2nd National Junior Road Race Championships
2000
3rd Overall Tour de Langkawi
2002
1st Stage 2 Vuelta a Cundinamarca
5th Tre Valli Varesine
2003
6th Overall Tour de Langkawi
2005
2nd Overall Tour of Slovenia
10th Coppa Ugo Agostoni
2006
1st Subida al Naranco
2007
1st GP Cittá di Camaiore
4th Coppa Ugo Agostoni
6th Overall Giro del Trentino
2008
4th Giro d'Oro
6th Overall Giro del Trentino
2009
1st Giro della Provincia di Reggio Calabria
2nd Gran Premio Nobili Rubinetterie
4th Gran Premio Industria e Commercio Artigianato Carnaghese
2010
2nd Overall Vuelta a la Comunidad de Madrid
3rd Overall Route du Sud
7th Overall Settimana Ciclistica Lombarda
7th Overall Course de la Solidarité Olympique
7th Trofeo Melinda
9th Overall Settimana Internazionale di Coppi e Bartali
9th Subida al Naranco
2011
1st Overall Tour de Kumano

1st Stage 2

1st Overall Brixia Tour
4th Overall Giro di Padania
5th Overall Giro della Provincia di Reggio Calabria
6th Trofeo Laigueglia
6th Gran Premio di Lugano
6th Trofeo Matteotti
2012
1st Overall Tour de Kumano

1st Stage 2

1st Overall Tour of Japan

1st Stage 4

2nd Coppa Ugo Agostoni
9th Overall Tour de Serbie

1st Mountains classification
1st Stage 4

10th Trofeo Matteotti
2013
1st Overall Tour of Japan
2nd Overall Tour de Kumano
3rd Overall Mzansi Tour
7th Overall Tour de Langkawi
2014
5th Overall Tour de Korea
