= Yasuhiro Yamamoto =

Japanese baseball player (born 1993)

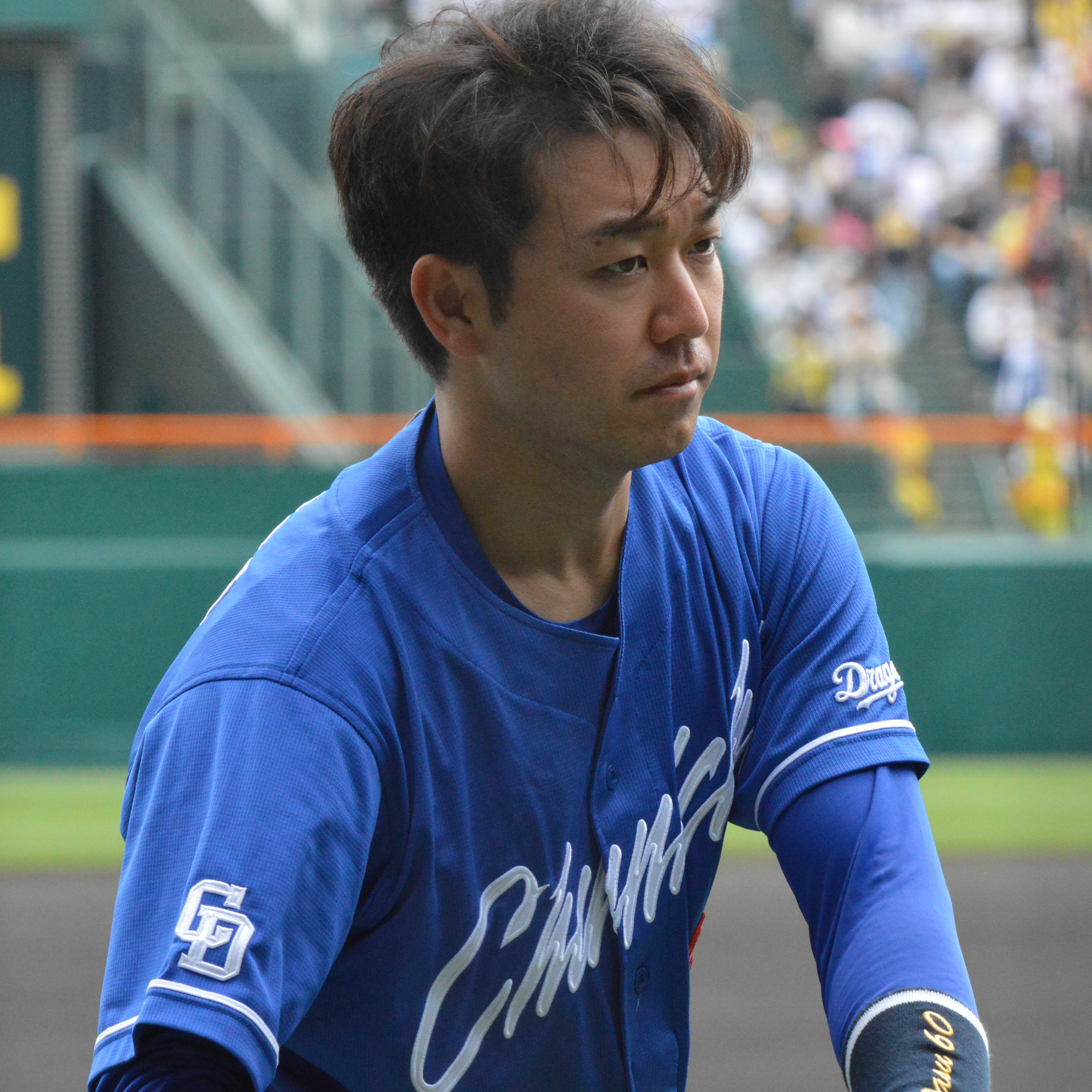

Chunichi Dragons – No. 60
- Infielder
- Born: October 10, 1993 (age 32); Arakawa, Tokyo, Japan
- Bats: Right Throws: Right

NPB debut
- May 1, 2016, for the Yomiuri Giants

Career statistics (through 2025 season)
- Batting average: .239
- Home runs: 10
- RBIs: 72
- Stats at Baseball Reference

Teams
- Yomiuri Giants (2016–2020); Hanshin Tigers (2021–2023); Chunichi Dragons (2024–present)

Yasuhiro Yamamoto (山本泰寛; born October 10, 1993) is a Japanese professional baseball player. He plays infielder for the Chunichi Dragons.
