= Moreno Di Biase =

Italian cyclist

Personal information
- Born: 5 November 1975 (age 50) Lanciano, Italy

Cycling career
- Sport: Cycling
- Discipline: Road
- Role: Rider

Amateur team
- 1996: VC Montesilvano

Professional teams
- 1998: Riso Scotti–MG Maglificio
- 1999–2000: Cantina Tollo–Alexia Alluminio
- 2001–2003: Mobilvetta Design–Formaggi Trentini
- 2004: Team ICET
- 2005: Colombia–Selle Italia

Moreno Di Biase (born 5 November 1975) is an Italian former professional racing cyclist. He rode in five editions of the Giro d'Italia.

== Major results ==
1996
1st Trofeo Città di Castelfidardo
1997
1st Trofeo Franco Balestra
1st Gran Premio San Giuseppe
1st Stage 6 Giro delle Regioni
1999
1st Stage 5 Tour de Langkawi
1st Stage 6 Tour de Slovénie
1st Stage 1 Tour of Japan
2000
1st Stage 5 Giro d'Abruzzo
6th Giro della Provincia di Siracusa
9th Giro di Campania
2001
8th Giro della Provincia di Siracusa
8th Criterium d'Abruzzo
2002
Tour de Langkawi

1st Stages 4 & 7

1st Stage 3 Brixia Tour
2003
1st Stage 2 Tour of Georgia
2005
7th Giro della Provincia di Reggio Calabria

=== Grand Tour general classification results timeline ===
Grand Tour	1999	2000	2001	2002	2003	2004	2005
Giro d'Italia	—	119	118	137	DNF	—	DNF
Tour de France	DNF	—	—	—	—	—	—
Vuelta a España	—	—	—	—	—	—	—

Legend
—	Did not compete
DNF	Did not finish
