= Tom Leaper =

Australian cyclist

Personal information
- Full name: Tom Leaper
- Born: 7 November 1975 (age 50) Melbourne, Australia

Cycling career
- Sport: Cycling
- Role: Rider

Tom Leaper (born 7 November 1975) is a former Australian racing cyclist. He finished in second place in the Australian National Road Race Championships in 1998.
