= Simone Mori (cyclist) =

Italian cyclist

Personal information
- Full name: Simone Mori
- Born: 23 April 1972 (age 54) Pontremoli, Italy

Cycling career
- Sport: Cycling
- Current team: Retired
- Disciplines: Road, Track
- Role: Rider

Professional teams
- 1997: Kross-Montanari-Selle Italia
- 1998: Kross-Selle Italia
- 1999: Amica Chips-Costa de Almeria
- 2000: Team Coast
- 2001: KIA-Suisse
- 2002: Jura Suisse
- 2002: Jura Suisse-Nippon Hodo
- 2003: Nippon Hodo
- 2003: Telekom Malaysia Cycling Team

Simone Mori (born 23 April 1972, in Pontremoli) is an Italian former professional racing cyclist.
