= Franky Van Haesebroucke =

Belgian cyclist

Personal information
- Full name: Franky Van Haesebroucke
- Born: 31 July 1970 (age 56) Deinze, Belgium

Cycling career
- Sport: Cycling
- Current team: Retired
- Disciplines: Road, track
- Role: Rider

Professional teams
- 1993: Morgan Oils–Tönissteiner
- 1994: Morgan Oils
- 1995: Asfra–Orlans
- 1996–1997: Ipso–Asfra
- 1998: Ipso–Euroclean
- 1998: ABOM Mount Buller
- 1999: Collstrop-De Federale Verzekeringen
- 2000: Telekom Malaysia Cycling Team
- 2000–2001: Navigators Insurance Cycling Team

Franky Van Haesebroucke (born 31 July 1970 in Deinze, Belgium) is a former Belgian professional racing cyclist and formerly riding for Navigators Insurance Cycling Team. He was active as a professional cyclist from 1993 to 2001
