= Koji Fukushima =

Japanese racing cyclist (born 1973)

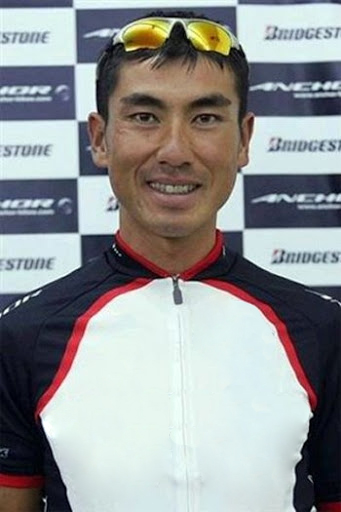

Personal information
- Full name: Koji Fukushima
- Born: August 21, 1973 (age 53) Japan

Cycling career
- Sport: Cycling
- Current team: Retired
- Discipline: Road
- Role: Rider

Professional teams
- 2004–2005: Team Bridgestone Anchor
- 2006: Cycle Racing Team Vang
- 2007: Nippo Corporation-Meitan Honpo-Asada
- 2008: Meitan Hompo-GDR

Major wins
- Ronde van Servië (2004); Tour of China (2004); Boucles de la Mayenne (2006)

Koji Fukushima (福島 康司, Fukushima Kōji; born August 21, 1973) is a Japanese former professional racing cyclist. He retired at the end of the 2008 season. His brother, Shinichi Fukushima, is also a professional cyclist.

== Career highlights ==
1. 2003: 3rd in General Classification GP Chantal Biya (Cameroon)
2. 2003: 3rd in Stage 2 Tour de Taiwan, Taitung (Taiwan)
3. 2003: 2nd in Stage 5 Tour de Taiwan, Shih Kang Dam (Taiwan)
4. 2004: 1st in Stage 3 Paths of King Nikola, Kotor
5. 2004: 1st in Stage 1 Ronde van Servië, Banja Koviljaca (Loznica) (Serbia)
6. 2004: 1st in General Classification Ronde van Servië (Serbia)
7. 2004: 2nd in Stage 1 Tour of China, Beijing (China)
8. 2004: 1st in Stage 3 Tour of China, Beijing (China)
9. 2004: 1st in General Classification Tour of China (China)
10. 2005: 1st in Prologue Tour of Siam, Chiang Mai (Thailand)
11. 2005: 2nd in Stage 1 Tour of Siam, Phrae (Thailand)
12. 2005: 1st in Stage 3 Le Tour de Langkawi, Tanah Merah (Malaysia)
13. 2005: 1st in Best Asian Riders Classifications (Blue Jersey) Le Tour de Langkawi (Malaysia)
14. 2005: 3rd in Stage 1 Circuit de Lorraine, Nancy (France)
15. 2005: 2nd in General Classification Circuit de Lorraine (France)
16. 2006: 2nd in Stage 1 Tour of Siam, Bangkok circuit (Thailand)
17. 2006: 3rd in Stage 2 Tour of Siam, Prachuap Khiri Khan (Thailand)
18. 2006: 1st in General Classification Boucles de la Mayenne (France)
19. 2006: 3rd in Stage 4 Tour d'Indonesia, Solo (Indonesia)
20. 2007: 1st in Stage 2 Tour of Siam, Si Nakharindra Dam (Thailand)
