= Luca Scinto =

Italian cyclist

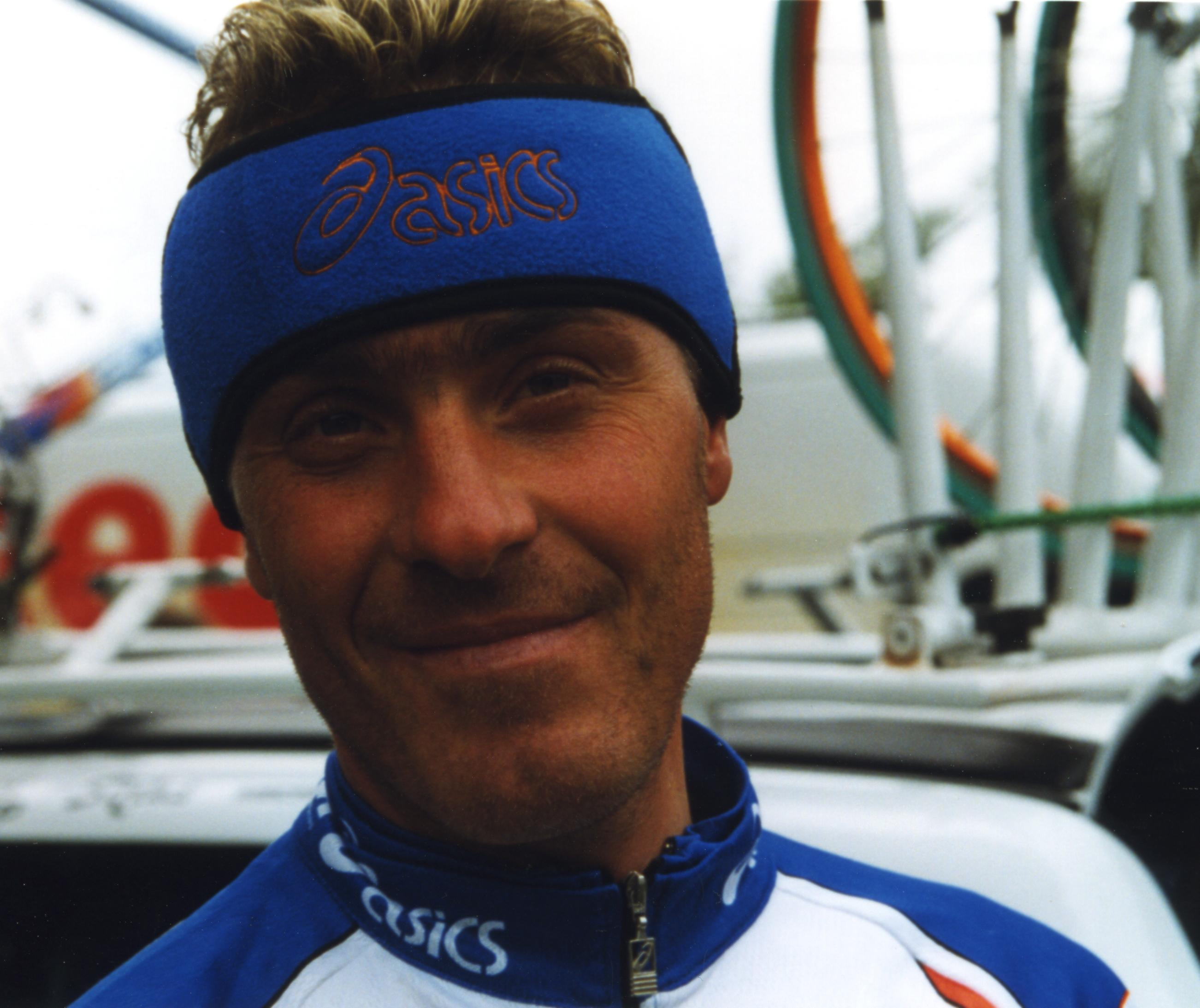

Personal information
- Born: 28 January 1968 (age 58) Fucecchio, Italy
- Height: 1.85 m (6 ft 1 in)
- Weight: 71 kg (157 lb; 11 st 3 lb)

Cycling career
- Sport: Cycling
- Current team: Retired
- Discipline: Road
- Role: Rider, manager
- Rider type: Domestique

Professional teams
- 1992: Italbonifica–Navigare
- 1994–1997: GB–MG Maglificio
- 1998: Asics–CGA
- 1999–2002: Mapei–Quick-Step

Managerial teams
- 2008: Danieli Cycling Team
- 2009–2014: ISD–NERI

Luca Scinto (born 28 January 1968 in Fucecchio) is an Italian former cyclist.

After retiring as a rider Scinto joined Angelo Citracca in forming the Italian-Ukrainian teamISD–NERI team for the 2009 season. At the end of the 2014 he stepped down from the team citing he was tired of being caught up in doping scandals.

== Major results ==
1993
1st Gran Premio Industria e Commercio Artigianato Carnaghese
1995
1st Gran Premio Città di Camaiore
1st Tour de Berne
3rd Italian National Time Trial Championships
1997
1st Tour de Langkawi

1st Mountains classification
1st Points classification
1 stage

1999
1st Giro di Toscana
2000
1 stage UNIQA Classic

== Grand Tour Results ==
=== Tour de France ===
- 1997: 120th

=== Giro d'Italia ===
- 1994: 86th
- 1998: DNF
- 2001: 109th
