= Zhu Yongbiao =

Chinese cyclist

Personal information
- Born: 12 March 1976 (age 50)

Cycling career
- Sport: Cycling

Zhu Yongbiao (born 12 March 1976) is a Chinese cyclist. He competed in the men's cross-country mountain biking event at the 2004 Summer Olympics.
