= Dominique Perras =

Canadian cyclist

Personal information
- Full name: Dominique Perras
- Born: 11 February 1974 (age 52) Napierville, Quebec, Canada

Cycling career
- Sport: Cycling
- Discipline: Road
- Role: Rider
- Rider type: Climber

Professional teams
- 2000: Phonak
- 2001: Ficonseils - RCC Conseils Assurances
- 2001: Servisco
- 2002: iTeamNova.com
- 2003: Flanders - iTeamNova
- 2004: Ofoto - Lombardi Sports
- 2005: Kodak Easyshare Gallery - Sierra Nevada Pro Cycling
- 2006: Kodakgallery.com - Sierra Nevada Pro Cycling
- 2007: Optum–Kelly Benefit Strategies
- 2008: Eva DeVinci

Major wins
- Canadian Road Race Championship (2003)

Dominique Perras is a Canadian retired professional cyclist born in Napierville, Quebec. He was part of the pro peloton from 2000 to 2008, and his major accomplishments have been stage wins on the Herald Sun Tour and the Tour of Qinghai Lake, and a victory on the Canadian Road Race Championship in 2003. In 2012, Perras is a cycling analyst on Quebec's television stations RDS and RDS2 with Louis Bertrand as commentator. Since 2014 the commentator is Sébastien Boucher.

== Palmares ==
1999
Tour de Beauce

1st Stages 2 & 5

2000
3rd Grand Prix de Lausanne
2002
Tour de Hokkaido

1st Stages 1 & 2

2nd Canadian Road Race Championship
2nd Classique Montréal-Québec Louis Garneau
2003
1st Canadian Road Race Championship
Herald Sun Tour

1st Stages 1 & 10

Tour of Qinghai Lake

1st Stages 3 & 6

2004
1st Classique Louis-Garneau Montréal - Québec
1st Stage 6 Herald Sun Tour
1st Stage 1 Greenmountain stage race
2005
2nd Overall Herald Sun Tour
3rd Canadian Road Race Championship
2006
3rd Canadian Road Race Championship
2007
3rd Canadian Road Race Championship
2008
2nd Classique Louis-Garneau Montréal - Québec
