= David Fernández (cyclist) =

Spanish cyclist

Personal information
- Full name: David Fernández Domingo
- Born: 16 February 1977 (age 49) Villaconejos, Spain

Cycling career
- Sport: Cycling
- Current team: Retired
- Discipline: Road
- Role: Rider

Professional teams
- 2000–2003: Colchon Relax–Fuenlabrada
- 2004: Costa de Almería–Paternina
- 2005: Andalucía–Paul Versan

David Fernández Domingo (born 16 February 1977 in Villaconejos) is a Spanish former cyclist.

== Major results ==
2001
2nd GP Llodio
2002
1st Stage 3 Vuelta a Castilla y León
1st Stage 5 Vuelta a Burgos
2003
1st Stage 2 Grande Prémio Mosqueteros-Ruta del Marqués
2005
1st Circuito de Getxo
