= Hendrik Van Dijck =

Belgian cyclist

Personal information
- Full name: Hendrik Van Dijck
- Born: 5 February 1974 (age 52) Herentals, Belgium

Cycling career
- Sport: Cycling
- Current team: Retired
- Discipline: Road
- Role: Rider

Professional teams
- 1994: TVM-Bison Kit (stagiare)
- 1995: TVM
- 1996–1999: TVM-Farm Frites
- 2000: Palmans-Ideal
- 2001: Lotto-Adecco
- 2002–2003: Palmans-Collstrop

Major wins
- Nokere Koerse (3 times); E3 Prijs Vlaanderen

Hendrik Van Dijck (born 5 February 1974, in Herentals) is a Belgian former professional road bicycle racer.

== Victories ==
1994
Hasselt-Spa-Hasselt
1995
5th stage Hofbrau Cup
2nd Stage Niederösterreich Rundfahrt
1996
Nokere Koerse
1997
E3 Prijs Vlaanderen
Nokere Koerse
6th stage Tour of Sweden
2nd stage Vuelta a Castilla y León
1999
Grand Prix Rudy Dhaenens
2000
Nokere Koerse
1st stage Tour of Murcia
