= Bjørnar Vestøl =

Norwegian cyclist

Personal information
- Full name: Bjørnar Vestøl
- Born: May 28, 1974 (age 52) Oslo, Norway
- Height: 190 cm (6 ft 3 in)
- Weight: 85 kg (187 lb)

Cycling career
- Sport: Cycling
- Current team: Retired
- Discipline: Road
- Role: Rider

Amateur team
- 1990–1997: Grimstad SK–Horten og Omegn SK

Professional teams
- 1998–1999: Acceptcard Pro Cycling
- 2000: Linda McCartney Racing Team
- 2001: Telekom Malaysia
- 2001–2003: Team Fakta
- 2004: Team Sparebanken Vest

Major wins
- Ronde van Noord-Holland 2000

Bjørnar Vestøl (born May 28, 1974 in Oslo) is a Norwegian former professional racing cyclist. He competed in the men's individual road race at the 2000 Summer Olympics. He also rode in the 2000 Giro d'Italia and finished 125th overall.

== Major results ==
1997
1st Stage 2 Tour of Sweden
2nd Road race, National Road Championships
1998
3rd Overall Ster der Beloften

1st Stage 3

1999
1st Grand Prix de la Ville de Lillers
1st Stage 1 Ringerike GP
1st Stage 6 Tour de Langkawi
2nd Time trial, National Road Championships
3rd Overall Prudential Tour
10th Grand Prix Herning
2000
1st Ronde van Noord-Holland
1st Stage 7 Circuito Montañes
National Road Championships

2nd Road race
2nd Time trial

2001
1st Rund um Düren
1st Stage 5 Hessen Rundfahrt
2nd Kampioenschap van Vlaanderen
8th Druivenkoers Overijse
2002
3rd Time trial, National Road Championships
6th A Travers le Morbihan
10th Le Samyn
2003
3rd Time trial, National Road Championships
5th GP Stad Zottegem
