= Eric Wohlberg =

Canadian cyclist

Personal information
- Born: January 8, 1965 (age 61) Sudbury, Ontario
- Height: 1.7 m (5 ft 7 in)
- Weight: 63 kg (139 lb)

Cycling career
- Sport: Cycling
- Current team: Retired
- Discipline: Road
- Role: Rider; Directeur sportif
- Rider type: Time-trialist

Professional teams
- 1997–2000: Team Shaklee
- 2001–2003: Saturn
- 2004: Sierra Nevada Cycling
- 2005–2008: Symmetrics

Managerial teams
- 2009–2010: Bissell
- 2012–: Optum–Kelly Benefit Strategies
Medal record
Men's road bicycle racing
Representing Canada
Pan American Games
| Gold medal – first place | 1999 Winnipeg | Time Trial |
Pan American Championships
| Bronze medal – third place | 2006 São Paulo | Time trial |
Commonwealth Games
| Gold medal – first place | 1998 Kuala Lumpur | Time Trial |
| Bronze medal – third place | 1998 Kuala Lumpur | Road Race |

Eric Wohlberg (born January 8, 1965, in Sudbury, Ontario) is a Canadian former professional racing cyclist. He competed for his native country at three consecutive Summer Olympics, starting in 1996. Wohlberg won two medals at the 1998 Commonwealth Games in Kuala Lumpur, Malaysia. He also won the Tour of the Gila in 2000. He is also a multi-time Canadian National Time Trial Champion. As of 2013, he was still racing as an amateur against regional professionals in Northern California & Nevada. He is a directeur sportif (DS) for Rally Cycling.

== Major results ==
1995
1st Overall Tour de Beauce
1996
National Road Championships

1st Time trial
2nd Road race

1st Overall Tour de Hokkaido
1997
National Road Championships

1st Time trial
2nd Road race

1st Stage 1 (ITT) Tour de Langkawi
1st Overall Hotter'N Hell Hundred

1st Stages 2 & 3

1st Stage 1 Tour de Toona
1998
1st Time trial, National Road Championships
Commonwealth Games

1st Time trial
3rd Road race

1st Stage 6 Tour de Toona
2nd Overall Hotter'N Hell Hundred

1st Stage 3

1999
1st Time trial, Pan American Road Championships
1st Time trial, National Road Championships
1st Overall Hotter'N Hell Hundred

1st Stage 3

1st Overall Tour of Somerville
1st Stage 8 Tour de Langkawi
1st Prologue & Stage 4a Tour de Beauce
9th Overall Herald Sun Tour
2000
National Road Championships

1st Time trial
5th Road race

1st Overall Tour of the Gila
1st Overall Tour de Hokkaido
1st Stage 3 Hotter'N Hell Hundred
3rd Overall Fitchburg Longsjo Classic

1st Stage 1

4th Overall Herald Sun Tour

1st Stage 11 (ITT)

2001
1st Time trial, National Road Championships
1st Overall Fitchburg Longsjo Classic

1st Stage 1

1st Overall Tour of Somerville
1st Cat's Hill Classic
1st Stages 5 & 6 Tour of Southland
3rd Overall Tour de Toona
6th Overall Herald Sun Tour
2002
1st Time trial, National Road Championships
1st Tour de Nez
1st Cat's Hill Classic
1st Stage 9 Tour of Southland
5th Road race, Commonwealth Games
7th Overall Herald Sun Tour
2003
National Road Championships

1st Time trial
3rd Road race

1st Nevada City Classic
1st Tour de Nez
1st Stage 5 Herald Sun Tour
2nd Overall Joe Martin Stage Race

1st Stage 1

2nd Overall Tour of Queensland

1st Stage 1

9th Overall Sea Otter Classic
10th T-Mobile International
2004
1st Overall Tour of Wellington

1st Stage 2a

1st Stage 5 (ITT) Tour de Langkawi
National Road Championships

2nd Time trial
5th Road race

5th Overall Sea Otter Classic
10th Overall Tour of Georgia
2005
National Road Championships

2nd Road race
2nd Time trial

5th Overall Redlands Bicycle Classic
2006
1st Stage 3 (TTT) Vuelta a El Salvador
2nd Cat's Hill Classic
3rd Time trial, Pan American Road Championships
National Road Championships

3rd Time trial
4th Road race

6th Overall Vuelta Sonora

1st Stage 3

7th Overall Tour de Hokkaido
2007
1st Stages 1 & 4 (TTT) Vuelta a El Salvador
8th Overall Herald Sun Tour
2008
1st Stage 3 Tour de Nez
National Road Championships

4th Road race
5th Time trial

6th US Air Force Cycling Classic
