= Palmans (cycling team) =

Cycling team

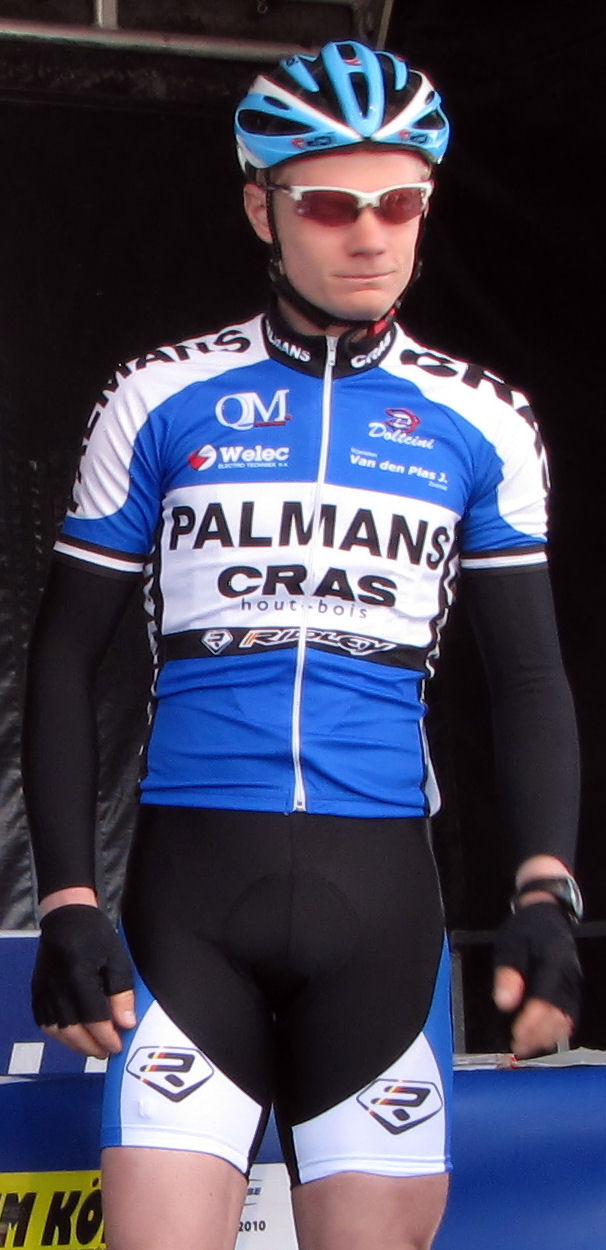
- Egidijus Juodvalkis wearing the team's jersey in 2010.

Team information
- UCI code: PCO
- Registered: Belgium
- Founded: 1993
- Disbanded: 2010
- Disciplines: Road; Cyclo-cross
- Status: UCI Continental (2006–2010)
- Bicycles: Ridley

Key personnel
- General manager: Charles Palmans
- Team manager: Marcel Omloop

Team name history
- 1993 1994 1995 1996 1997 1998–2000 2001 2002–2003 2006–2007 2008–2010: Primator–Palmans; Palmans–Inco Coating; Palmans–Ipso; Palmans–Boghemans; Palmans–Lystex; Palmans–Ideal; Collstrop–Palmans; Palmans–Collstrop; Palmans–Collstrop; Palmans–Cras
Palmans jersey
Jersey

Palmans was a Belgian professional road and cyclo-cross cycling team that existed from 1993 until 2010. The team underwent many different name changes throughout its existence, but was always sponsored by Palmans, an international road transport company.

In 2000, the team merged with Collstrop, another Belgian team.

The team disbanded for two years in 2004. Part of the staff and Palmans, the main sponsor, helped form a new Belgian team, Mr. Bookmaker–Palmans–Collstrop. In 2006, MrBookmaker.com–SportsTech split in two. Part of the team became Unibet.com and the other returned to Palmans–Collstrop. In 2010, the team permanently disbanded.

== Major wins ==
=== Races ===
- Omloop van het Waasland : Jan Bogaert (1994), Wim Omloop (1997), Geert Omloop (2003)
- Omloop van het Houtland : Jans Koerts (1995), Niko Eeckhout (2000), Geert Omloop (2001, 2003)
- Le Samyn : Hans De Meester (1996)
- Grote 1-MeiPrijs : Peter Spaenhoven (1997), Geert Omloop (2001), Roger Hammond (2002)
- Grand Prix d'Isbergues : Magnus Bäckstedt (1997), Peter Van Petegem (2001)
- Circuit Franco-Belge : Frank Høj (1998)
- Nokere Koerse : Hendrik Van Dijck (2000)
- Circuito Montañés : Dave Bruylandts (2000)
- Kampioenschap van Vlaanderen : Niko Eeckhout (2000)
- Kuurne–Brussels–Kuurne : Peter Van Petegem (2001)
- Tour Beneden-Maas : Geert Omloop (2001), Roger Hammond (2002)
- Grand Prix de Denain : Bert Roesems (2003)
- Antwerpse Havenpijl : Rob Goris (2010)
- Schaal Sels : Aidis Kruopis (2010)

=== National championships ===
2003
Belgium Road Race, Geert Omloop
Britain Road Race, Roger Hammond
2008
Finland Time Trial, Matti Helminen
