= 2004 Tour de Langkawi =

Race details
- Dates: 6–15 February 2004
- Stages: 10
- Distance: 1,242.9 km (772.3 mi)
- Winning time: 28h 52' 52"

Results
Jersey awarded to the overall winner	Winner	Fredy González (COL)	(Colombia–Selle Italia)
	Second	Ryan Cox (RSA)	(Barloworld)
	Third	Dave Bruylandts (BEL)	(Chocolade Jacques-Wincor Nixdorf)
Jersey awarded to the points classification winner	Points	Gordon Fraser (CAN)	(Health Net–Maxxis)
Jersey awarded to the mountains classification winner	Mountains	Ruber Marín (COL)	(Colombia–Selle Italia)
	Team	Barloworld	

The 2004 Tour de Langkawi was the 9th edition of the Tour de Langkawi, a cycling stage race that took place in Malaysia. It began on 6 February in Bayan Baru and ended on 15 February in Merdeka Square, Kuala Lumpur. In fact, this race was rated by the Union Cycliste Internationale (UCI) as a 2.2 category race.

Fredy González of Colombia won the race, followed by Ryan Cox of South Africa second and Dave Bruylandts of Belgium third. Gordon Fraser of Australia won the points classification category and Ruber Marín of Colombia won the mountains classification category. Barloworld won the team classification category.

== Stages ==
The cyclists competed in 12 stages, covering a distance of 1,242.9 kilometres.

Stage	Date	Course	Distance	Stage result		
Stage	Date	Course	Distance	Winner	Second	Third
1	6 February	Bayan Baru to Taiping	112 km (69.6 mi)	Due to the traffic conditions in the final lap, the College of Commissaires and the Race Organiser had been decided that stage 1 was neutralised. Points and bonuses for stage 1 had been withdrawn.		
2	7 February	Ipoh to Tanah Rata	151.6 km (94.2 mi)	Marlon Pérez Arango (COL)	Fredy González (COL)	Ryan Cox (RSA)
3	8 February	Tapah to Raub	171.2 km (106.4 mi)	Brett Lancaster (AUS)	Gordon Fraser (CAN)	Gert Vanderaerden (BEL)
4	9 February	Ulu Klang to Tampin	147.8 km (91.8 mi)	Sean Sullivan (AUS)	Devis Miorin (ITA)	Michael Sayers (USA)
5	10 February	Malacca Individual time trial	18 km (11.2 mi)	Eric Wohlberg (CAN)	Marlon Pérez Arango (COL)	John Lieswyn (USA)
6	11 February	Muar to Johor Bahru	175.2 km (108.9 mi)	Ivan Quaranta (ITA)	Luciano Pagliarini (BRA)	Guillermo Bongiorno (ARG)
7	12 February	Pontian to Malacca	166.7 km (103.6 mi)	Luciano Pagliarini (BRA)	Gordon Fraser (CAN)	Graeme Brown (AUS)
8	13 February	Port Dickson to Shah Alam	96.4 km (59.9 mi)	Luciano Pagliarini (BRA)	Enrico Degano (ITA)	Graeme Brown (AUS)
9	14 February	Kuala Lumpur to Genting Highlands	131.6 km (81.8 mi)	Ruber Marín (COL)	Fredy González (COL)	Dave Bruylandts (BEL)
10	15 February	Merdeka Square, Kuala Lumpur Criterium	80.4 km (50.0 mi)	Guillermo Bongiorno (ARG)	Gregory Henderson (NZL)	Matteo Carrara (ITA)

== Classification leadership ==
Stage	Stage winner	General classification	Points classification	Mountains classification	Asian rider classification	Team classification	Asian team classification
1	No winner						
2	Marlon Pérez Arango	Marlon Pérez Arango	Marlon Pérez Arango	Marlon Pérez Arango	Ghader Mizbani	Colombia–Selle Italia	Iran
3	Brett Lancaster	Fredy González	Gordon Fraser	Marlon Pérez Arango	Ghader Mizbani	Barloworld	Japan
4	Sean Sullivan	Fredy González	Gordon Fraser	Marlon Pérez Arango	Ghader Mizbani	Barloworld	Japan
5	Eric Wohlberg	Marlon Pérez Arango	Gordon Fraser	Marlon Pérez Arango	Ghader Mizbani	Barloworld	Japan
6	Ivan Quaranta	Marlon Pérez Arango	Gordon Fraser	Marlon Pérez Arango	Ghader Mizbani	Barloworld	Japan
7	Luciano Pagliarini	Marlon Pérez Arango	Gordon Fraser	Marlon Pérez Arango	Ghader Mizbani	Barloworld	Japan
8	Luciano Pagliarini	Marlon Pérez Arango	Gordon Fraser	Marlon Pérez Arango	Ghader Mizbani	Barloworld	Japan
9	Ruber Marín	Fredy González	Gordon Fraser	Ruber Marín	Ghader Mizbani	Barloworld	Iran
10	Guillermo Bongiorno	Fredy González	Gordon Fraser	Ruber Marín	Ghader Mizbani	Barloworld	Iran
Final		Fredy González	Gordon Fraser	Ruber Marín	Ghader Mizbani	Barloworld	Iran

== Final standings ==
=== General classification ===
	Rider	Team	Time
1	Fredy González (COL)	Colombia–Selle Italia	28h 52' 52"
2	Ryan Cox (RSA)	Barloworld	+ 48"
3	Dave Bruylandts (BEL)	Chocolade Jacques-Wincor Nixdorf	+ 01' 54"
4	Tiaan Kannemeyer (RSA)	Barloworld	+ 01' 55"
5	Nicholas White (RSA)	South Africa	+ 02' 12"
6	Ruber Marín (COL)	Colombia–Selle Italia	+ 02' 22"
7	Marlon Pérez Arango (COL)	Colombia–Selle Italia	+ 02' 30"
8	David George (RSA)	Barloworld	+ 02' 31"
9	Kurt Van De Wouwer (BEL)	Mr. Bookmaker–Palmans–Collstrop	+ 04' 06"
10	Roland Green (CAN)	Canada	+ 04' 06"

=== Points classification ===
	Rider	Team	Points
1	Gordon Fraser (CAN)	Health Net–Maxxis	105
2	Gert Vanderaerden (BEL)	Mr. Bookmaker–Palmans–Collstrop	70
3	Marlon Pérez Arango (COL)	Colombia–Selle Italia	65
4	Luciano Pagliarini (BRA)	Lampre	46
5	Enrico Degano (ITA)	Barloworld	45
6	Fredy González (COL)	Colombia–Selle Italia	40
7	Guillermo Bongiorno (ARG)	Ceramica Panaria–Margres	38
7	Hector Guerra Garcia (ESP)	Relax–Bodysol	38
9	Gregory Henderson (NZL)	Health Net–Maxxis	34
10	Ivan Quaranta (ITA)	Formaggi Pinzolo Fiave	32
10	David George (RSA)	Barloworld	32

=== Mountains classification ===
	Rider	Team	Points
1	Ruber Marín (COL)	Colombia–Selle Italia	57
2	Fredy González (COL)	Colombia–Selle Italia	40
3	Marlon Pérez Arango (COL)	Colombia–Selle Italia	34
4	Ryan Cox (RSA)	Barloworld	23
5	Sean Sullivan (AUS)	Barloworld	20
6	Hector Guerra Garcia (ESP)	Relax–Bodysol	19
7	Devis Miorin (ITA)	De-Nardi	18
8	Dave Bruylandts (BEL)	Chocolade Jacques-Wincor Nixdorf	16
8	David George (RSA)	Barloworld	16
10	Brett Lancaster (AUS)	Ceramica Panaria–Margres	15
10	Luis Felipe Laverde (COL)	Formaggi Pinzolo Fiave	15

=== Asian rider classification ===
	Rider	Team	Time
1	Ghader Mizbani (IRI)	Iran	28h 57' 19"
2	Ahad Kazemi (IRI)	Iran	+ 03' 49"
3	Tonton Susanto (INA)	Wismilak	+ 05' 49"
4	Yasutaka Tashiro (JPN)	Japan	+ 09' 07"
5	Shahrulneeza Razali (MAS)	Malaysia	+ 12' 11"
6	Jiang Xueli (CHN)	China	+ 13' 42"
7	Shao Xiaojun (CHN)	China	+ 15' 40"
8	Rhyan Tanguilig (PHI)	Pagcor-Casino Filipino	+ 15' 56"
9	Lloyd Lucien Reynante (PHI)	Pagcor-Casino Filipino	+ 17' 10"
10	Shinichi Fukushima (JPN)	Japan	+ 17' 12"

=== Team classification ===
	Team	Time
1	Barloworld	86h 41' 27"
2	Colombia–Selle Italia	+ 43"
3	Relax–Bodysol	+ 12' 40"
4	Lampre	+ 17' 45"
5	Chocolade Jacques-Wincor Nixdorf	+ 21' 42"
6	Canada	+ 21' 52"
7	De-Nardi	+ 22' 12"
8	South Africa	+ 24' 13"
9	Mr. Bookmaker–Palmans–Collstrop	+ 29' 36"
10	Republic of Ireland	+ 32' 35"

=== Asian team classification ===
	Team	Time
1	Iran	87h 17' 32"
2	Japan	+ 11' 07"
3	China	+ 16' 32"
4	Pagcor-Casino Filipino	+ 26' 11"
5	Malaysia	+ 50' 25"
6	Wismilak	+ 01h 08' 17"

== List of teams and riders ==
A total of 20 teams were invited to participate in the 2004 Tour de Langkawi. Out of the 140 riders, a total of 121 riders made it to the finish in Kuala Lumpur.

Lampre

- (Brazil) Luciano Pagliarini
- (Italy) Wladimir Belli
- (Italy) Matteo Carrara
- (Italy) Marco Pinotti
- (Italy) Alessandro Cortinovis
- (Italy) Sergio Barbero
- (Italy) Michele Scotto D'abusco

Chocolade Jacques-Wincor Nixdorf

- (Netherlands) Jans Koerts
- (Belgium) Dave Bruylandts
- (Colombia) Mauricio Ardila
- (Spain) Andoni Aranaga
- (Poland) Zbigniew Piątek
- (Netherlands) Jan Van Velzen
- (Belgium) Jurgen Van de Walle

Colombia–Selle Italia

- (Colombia) Fredy González
- (Colombia) Ruber Marín
- (Colombia) Urbelino Mesa
- (Colombia) Marlon Pérez Arango
- (Venezuela) José Rujano
- (Australia) Russel Van Hout
- (Australia) Trent Wilson

De-Nardi

- (Italy) Graziano Gasparre
- (Italy) Michele Gobbi
- (Italy) Enrico Grigoli
- (Italy) Devis Miorin
- (Uzbekistan) Rafael Nuritdinov
- (Italy) Antonio Rizzi
- (United Kingdom) Charly Wegelius

Mr. Bookmaker–Palmans–Collstrop

- (United Kingdom) Jeremy Hunt
- (Belgium) Kurt Van De Wouwer
- (France) Frédéric Gabriel
- (Belgium) Peter Wuyts
- (Belgium) Michel Van Haecke
- (Belgium) Gert Vanderaerden
- (Australia) Ben Day

Ceramica Panaria–Margres

- (Italy) Fortunato Baliani
- (Australia) Graeme Brown
- (Argentina) Alejandro Borrajo
- (Ukraine) Sergiy Matveyev
- (Italy) Fabio Gilioli
- (Argentina) Guillermo Bongiorno
- (Australia) Brett Lancaster

Formaggi Pinzolo Fiave

- (Italy) Ivan Quaranta
- (Italy) Mario Manzoni
- (Italy) Corrado Serina
- (Italy) Giulini Sulpizi
- (Italy) Domenico Gualdi
- (Italy) Matteo Cappe
- (Colombia) Luis Felipe Laverde

Relax–Bodysol

- (Spain) Xavier Florencio
- (Spain) Santiago Blanco Gil
- (Spain) Moises Duenas Nevado
- (Belgium) Johan Vansummeren
- (Spain) Hector Guerra Garcia
- (Spain) Nácor Burgos
- (Spain) Oscar Laguna Garcia

Barloworld

- (South Africa) David George
- (Italy) Enrico Degano
- (Australia) Sean Sullivan
- (South Africa) Ryan Cox
- (South Africa) Jock Green
- (South Africa) James Lewis Perry
- (South Africa) Tiaan Kannemeyer

Health Net–Maxxis

- (Canada) Gordon Fraser
- (New Zealand) Gregory Henderson
- (United States) Brice Jones
- (United States) Danny Pate
- (United States) John Lieswyn
- (United States) Scott Moninger
- (United States) Michael Sayers

Bert Story-Piels

- (Netherlands) Germ van der Burg
- (Netherlands) Dennis van Uden
- (Netherlands) Coen Loos
- (Netherlands) Reinier Honig
- (Netherlands) Jasper Lenferink
- (Netherlands) Jarko van der Stelt
- (Netherlands) Arne Kornegoor

Wismilak

- (Indonesia) Tonton Susanto
- (Indonesia) Sama'i Sama'i
- (Indonesia) Wawan Setyobudi
- (Indonesia) Matnur Matnur
- (Netherlands) Ano Pedersen
- (New Zealand) Scott Guyton
- (Australia) Christopher Bradford

Japan

- (Japan) Yoshiyuki Abe
- (Japan) Kazuyuki Manabe
- (Japan) Shinichi Fukushima
- (Japan) Kazuya Okazaki
- (Japan) Makoto Iijima
- (Japan) Tomoya Kano
- (Japan) Yasutaka Tashiro

Canada

- (Canada) Roland Green
- (Canada) Eric Wohlberg
- (Canada) Dominique Perras
- (Canada) Charles Dionne
- (Canada) Cory Lange
- (Canada) Peter Wedge
- (Canada) Alexandre Lavallée

Iran

- (Iran) Hassan Maleki
- (Iran) Ahad Kazemi
- (Iran) Ghader Mizbani
- (Iran) Abbas Saeidi Tanha
- (Iran) Mohammad Rajabloo
- (Iran) Amir Zargari
- (Iran) Saeid Chehrzad

China

- (China) Wang Guozhang
- (China) Luo Jianshi
- (China) Zheng Xiaohai
- (China) Li Fuyu
- (China) Zhu Yongbiao
- (China) Shao Xiaojun
- (China) Jiang Xueli

Malaysia

- (Malaysia) Shahrulneeza Razali
- (Malaysia) Mohd Mahadzir Hamad
- (Malaysia) Musairi Musa
- (Malaysia) Mohd Najmee Abd Ghani
- (Malaysia) Mohd Sazlee Ismail
- (Malaysia) Nor Effendy Rosli
- (Malaysia) Mohd Sayuti Mohd Zahit

South Africa

- (South Africa) Jaco Odenaal
- (South Africa) Ian McLeod
- (South Africa) Daryl Impey
- (South Africa) Reinhardt Duplessis
- (South Africa) Nicholas White
- (South Africa) Jeremy Maartens
- (South Africa) Neil McDonald

Republic of Ireland

- (Republic of Ireland) David McCann
- (Republic of Ireland) David O'Loughlin
- (Republic of Ireland) Philip Deignan
- (Republic of Ireland) Denis Lynch
- (Republic of Ireland) Paul Griffin
- (Republic of Ireland) Eugene Moriarty
- (Republic of Ireland) Tim Barry

Pagcor-Casino Filipino

- (Philippines) Victor Espiritu
- (Philippines) Rhyan Tanguilig
- (Philippines) Lloyd Lucien Reynante
- (Philippines) Merculio Ramos
- (Philippines) Alfie Catalan
- (Philippines) Albert Primero
- (Philippines) Ronald Gorantes
