= 2006 Tour de Langkawi =

2005–06 UCI Asia Tour

Race details
- Dates: 3–12 February 2006
- Stages: 10
- Distance: 1,161.4 km (721.7 mi)
- Winning time: 26h 43' 55"

Results
Jersey awarded to the overall winner	Winner	David George (RSA)	(South Africa)
	Second	Francesco Bellotti (ITA)	(Crédit Agricole)
	Third	Gabriele Missaglia (ITA)	(Selle Italia–Diquigiovanni)
Jersey awarded to the points classification winner	Points	Steffen Radochla (GER)	(Wiesenhof Akud)
Jersey awarded to the mountains classification winner	Mountains	David George (RSA)	(South Africa)
	Team	Selle Italia–Diquigiovanni	

The 2006 Tour de Langkawi was the 11th edition of the Tour de Langkawi, a cycling stage race that took place in Malaysia. It started on 3 February in Kuala Lumpur and ended on 12 February in Kuala Lumpur. In fact, this race was rated by the Union Cycliste Internationale (UCI) as a 2.HC (hors category) race on the 2005–06 UCI Asia Tour calendar.

David George of South Africa won the race, followed by Francesco Bellotti of Italy second and Gabriele Missaglia of Italy third. Steffen Radochla of Germany won the points classification category and David George won the mountains classification category. South Africa won the team classification category.

== Stages ==
The cyclists competed in 10 stages, covering a distance of 1,161.4 kilometres. Due to the extreme weather conditions(heavy downpour) experienced during the Stage 10 of the 2006 Tour de Langkawi, the stage result was abandoned according to the decision of the College of Commissaires and the Race Organizer. All classification would be as at the end of Stage 9. However, Ángel Vallejo Domínguez (Relax–GAM) who had a substantial lone lead at the time of the decision abandon was made had been awarded the stage.

Stage	Date	Course	Distance	Stage result		
Stage	Date	Course	Distance	Winner	Second	Third
1	3 February	KL Tower to Rawang	81.1 km (50.4 mi)	Maximiliano Richeze (ARG)	Erki Pütsep (EST)	Takashi Miyazawa (JPN)
2	4 February	Tanjung Malim to Sitiawan	164.7 km (102.3 mi)	Guillermo Bongiorno (ARG)	Maximiliano Richeze (ARG)	Steffen Radochla (GER)
3	5 February	Lumut to Cameron Highlands	150.3 km (93.4 mi)	Saul Raisin (USA)	David George (RSA)	Darren Lill (RSA)
4	6 February	Tapah to Kuala Selangor	144.5 km (89.8 mi)	José Serpa (COL)	Evan Oliphant (GBR)	Christophe Riblon (FRA)
5	7 February	Menara Telekom to Genting Highlands	90 km (55.9 mi)	José Serpa (COL)	José Miguel Elías (ESP)	Massimo Iannetti (ITA)
6	8 February	Shah Alam to Tampin	187.7 km (116.6 mi)	Laurent Mangel (FRA)	Gene Bates (AUS)	Yoann Le Boulanger (FRA)
7	9 February	Muar to Kota Tinggi	188.2 km (116.9 mi)	Elio Aggiano (ITA)	Russell Downing (GBR)	Bernard Van Ulden (USA)
8	10 February	Yong Peng to Segamat	78.7 km (48.9 mi)	Sébastien Hinault (FRA)	Mark Cavendish (GBR)	Samuele Marzoli (ITA)
9	11 February	Malacca Individual time trial	16.2 km (10.1 mi)	Sergiy Matveyev (UKR)	David McCann (IRL)	Stef Clement (NED)
10	12 February	Kuala Lumpur Criterium	60 km (37.3 mi)	Ángel Vallejo Domínguez (ESP)	Not awarded	

== Classification leadership ==
Stage	Stage winner	General classification	Points classification	Mountains classification	Asian rider classification	Team classification	Asian team classification
1	Maximiliano Richeze	Maximiliano Richeze	Steffen Radochla	Francesco Bellotti	Takashi Miyazawa	Relax–GAM	Wismilak
2	Guillermo Bongiorno	Maximiliano Richeze	Steffen Radochla	Francesco Bellotti	Takashi Miyazawa	Relax–GAM	Wismilak
3	Saul Raisin	David George	Steffen Radochla	Darren Lill	Takashi Miyazawa	Crédit Agricole	Japan
4	José Serpa	David George	Steffen Radochla	Darren Lill	Takashi Miyazawa	Selle Italia–Diquigiovanni	Japan
5	José Serpa	David George	Steffen Radochla	David George	Hossein Askari	Selle Italia–Diquigiovanni	Japan
6	Laurent Mangel	David George	Steffen Radochla	David George	Hossein Askari	Selle Italia–Diquigiovanni	Japan
7	Elio Aggiano	David George	Steffen Radochla	David George	Hossein Askari	Selle Italia–Diquigiovanni	Japan
8	Sébastien Hinault	David George	Steffen Radochla	David George	Hossein Askari	Selle Italia–Diquigiovanni	Japan
9	Sergiy Matveyev	David George	Steffen Radochla	David George	Hossein Askari	Selle Italia–Diquigiovanni	Japan
10	Ángel Vallejo Domínguez	David George	Steffen Radochla	David George	Hossein Askari	Selle Italia–Diquigiovanni	Japan
Final		David George	Steffen Radochla	David George	Hossein Askari	Selle Italia–Diquigiovanni	Japan

== Final standings ==
=== General classification ===
	Rider	Team	Time
1	David George (RSA)	South Africa	26h 43' 55"
2	Francesco Bellotti (ITA)	Crédit Agricole	+ 01' 52"
3	Gabriele Missaglia (ITA)	Selle Italia–Diquigiovanni	+ 01' 56"
4	César Grajales (COL)	Navigators Insurance	+ 02' 31"
5	Walter Pedraza (COL)	Selle Italia–Diquigiovanni	+ 03' 11"
6	José Serpa (COL)	Selle Italia–Diquigiovanni	+ 04' 20"
7	José Miguel Elías (ESP)	Relax–GAM	+ 04' 41"
8	Laurent Lefèvre (FRA)	Bouygues Télécom	+ 04' 46"
9	Robin Sharman (GBR)	Recycling.co.uk	+ 04' 57"
10	Benoît Poilvet (FRA)	Crédit Agricole	+ 05' 15"

=== Points classification ===
	Rider	Team	Points
1	Steffen Radochla (GER)	Wiesenhof–Akud	77
2	José Serpa (COL)	Selle Italia–Diquigiovanni	51
3	David McCann (IRL)	Giant Asia Racing Team	46
4	Gabriele Missaglia (ITA)	Selle Italia–Diquigiovanni	46
5	Samuele Marzoli (ITA)	Team LPR	46
6	Mark Cavendish (GBR)	Great Britain	40
7	Francesco Bellotti (ITA)	Crédit Agricole	38
8	Sébastien Hinault (FRA)	Crédit Agricole	37
9	Erki Pütsep (EST)	AG2R Prévoyance	37
10	Elio Aggiano (ITA)	LPR–Piacenza	35

=== Mountains classification ===
	Rider	Team	Points
1	David George (RSA)	South Africa	37
2	Darren Lill (RSA)	South Africa	35
3	José Miguel Elías (ESP)	Relax–GAM	30
4	David McCann (IRL)	Giant Asia Racing Team	28
5	José Serpa (COL)	Selle Italia–Diquigiovanni	25
6	Massimo Iannetti (ITA)	Team LPR	24
7	Saul Raisin (USA)	Crédit Agricole	23
8	Edward Clancy (GBR)	Great Britain	20
9	Francesco Bellotti (ITA)	Crédit Agricole	18
10	Walter Pedraza (COL)	Selle Italia–Diquigiovanni	14
10	Gene Bates (AUS)	Team LPR	14

=== Asian rider classification ===
	Rider	Team	Time
1	Hossein Askari (IRI)	Giant Asia Racing Team	26h 59' 47"
2	Takashi Miyazawa (JPN)	Japan	+ 02' 11"
3	Shinichi Fukushima (JPN)	Japan	+ 02' 39"
4	Ghader Mizbani (IRI)	Giant Asia Racing Team	+ 09' 16"
5	Vyacheslav Dyadichkin (KAZ)	Équipe Asia	+ 09' 48"
6	Suhardi Hassan (MAS)	Malaysia	+ 13' 17"
7	Shahrulneeza Razali (MAS)	Malaysia	+ 18' 00"
8	Wawan Setyobudi (INA)	Wismilak	+ 20' 18"
9	Mohd Fauzan Ahmad Lutfi (MAS)	Malaysia	+ 20' 36"
10	Victor Espiritu (PHI)	Casino Filipino	+ 21' 00"

=== Team classification ===
	Team	Time
1	Selle Italia–Diquigiovanni	80h 21' 01"
2	Crédit Agricole	+ 02' 46"
3	South Africa	+ 12' 32"
4	Recycling.co.uk	+ 33' 01"
5	Bouygues Télécom	+ 37' 06"
6	Relax–GAM	+ 39' 57"
7	Giant Asia Racing Team	+ 40' 02"
8	Ceramica Panaria–Navigare	+ 47' 00"
9	Team LPR	+ 56' 14"
10	Landbouwkrediet–Colnago	+ 01h 04' 39"

=== Asian team classification ===
	Team	Time
1	Japan	81h 25' 50"
2	Giant Asia Racing Team	+ 04' 57"
3	Malaysia	+ 17' 55"
4	Wismilak	+ 25' 37"
5	Équipe Asia	+ 33' 17"
6	Casino Filipino	+ 01h 18' 01"

== List of teams and riders ==
A total of 20 teams were invited to participate in the 2006 Tour de Langkawi. Out of the 119 riders, a total of 102 riders made it to the finish in Kuala Lumpur.

South Africa

- (South Africa) Ryan Cox
- (South Africa) Jacques Fullard
- (South Africa) David George
- (South Africa) Rodney Green
- (South Africa) Darren Lill
- (South Africa) Jeremy Maartens

Selle Italia–Diquigiovanni

- (Colombia) José Serpa
- (Italy) Wladimir Belli
- (Italy) Angelo Furlan
- (Italy) Alberto Loddo
- (Italy) Gabriele Missaglia
- (Colombia) Walter Pedraza

Malaysia

- (Malaysia) Shahrulneeza Razali
- (Malaysia) Ahmad Fallanie Ali
- (Malaysia) Mohd Fauzan Ahmad Lutfi
- (Malaysia) Suhardi Hassan
- (Malaysia) Mohd Jasmin Ruslan
- (Malaysia) Mohd Sayuti Mohd Zahit

Bouygues Télécom

- (Netherlands) Stef Clement
- (France) Andy Flickinger
- (France) Yohann Gène
- (France) Yoann Le Boulanger
- (France) Laurent Lefèvre
- (France) Anthony Ravard

Crédit Agricole

- (Italy) Francesco Bellotti
- (France) Sébastien Hinault
- (France) Christophe Le Mével
- (France) Cyril Lemoine
- (France) Benoît Poilvet
- (United States) Saul Raisin

Ceramica Panaria–Navigare

- (Mexico) Julio Alberto Pérez
- (Italy) Mirko Allegrini
- (Argentina) Guillermo Bongiorno
- (Ukraine) Sergiy Matveyev
- (Argentina) Maximiliano Richeze

Casino Filipino

- (Philippines) Victor Espiritu
- (Philippines) Bernardo Luzon
- (Philippines) Merculio Ramos
- (Philippines) Albert Primero
- (Philippines) Sherwin Carrera
- (Philippines) Sherwin Diamsay

Navigators Insurance

- (United States) Shawn Milne
- (Colombia) César Grajales
- (Russia) Oleg Grishkin
- (United States) Bernard Van Ulden
- (United States) Burke Swindlehurst
- (Canada) Mark Walters

Relax–GAM

- (Spain) Nácor Burgos
- (Spain) José Miguel Elías
- (Spain) Raúl García de Mateos
- (Spain) Daniel Moreno
- (Spain) Xavier Tondo
- (Spain) Ángel Vallejo Domínguez

Recycling.co.uk

- (United Kingdom) Ben Greenwood
- (United Kingdom) Kristian House
- (United Kingdom) Chris Newton
- (United Kingdom) Evan Oliphant
- (United Kingdom) Rob Partridge
- (United Kingdom) Robin Sharman

Yawadoo-Colba-ABM

- (Belgium) Gert Vanderaerden
- (Belgium) Koen Das
- (Belgium) Frederik Penne
- (Belgium) Gianni Riemslagh
- (Netherlands) Frank Van Kuik
- (Belgium) Micheal Vanderaerden

Great Britain

- (United Kingdom) Russell Downing
- (United Kingdom) Matt Brammeier
- (United Kingdom) Mark Cavendish
- (United Kingdom) Edward Clancy
- (United Kingdom) Geraint Thomas
- (United Kingdom) Julian Winn

Team LPR

- (Italy) Elio Aggiano
- (Australia) Gene Bates
- (Switzerland) Roger Beuchat
- (Switzerland) Andreas Dietziker
- (Italy) Massimo Iannetti
- (Italy) Samuele Marzoli

Landbouwkrediet–Colnago

- (Belgium) Grégory Habeaux
- (Belgium) Jean-Claude Lebeau
- (Belgium) Filip Meirhaeghe
- (Belgium) Sven Renders
- (Belgium) David Verheyen
- (Belgium) Johan Verstrepen

Équipe Asia

- (Malaysia) Ng Yong Li
- (Malaysia) Loh Sea Keong
- (Malaysia) Mohd Saiful Anuar Aziz
- (Kazakhstan) Yevgeniy Yakalov
- (Kazakhstan) Vyacheslav Dyadichkin
- (Indonesia) Hari Fitrianto

AG2R Prévoyance

- (France) Renaud Dion
- (France) Julien Loubet
- (France) Laurent Mangel
- (France) Carl Naibo
- (Estonia) Erki Pütsep
- (France) Christophe Riblon

Wismilak

- (Indonesia) Tonton Susanto
- (Indonesia) Wawan Setyobudi
- (Indonesia) Sulisttiyono Sulisttiyono
- (Indonesia) Matnur Matnur
- (Indonesia) Sama'i Sama'i
- (Indonesia) Adi Wibowo

Wiesenhof–Akud

- (Germany) Steffen Radochla
- (Germany) Torsten Schmidt
- (Germany) Robert Retschke
- (Australia) Corey Sweet
- (Czech Republic) Tomáš Konečný
- (Germany) Lars Wackernagel

Giant Asia Racing Team

- (Iran) Hossein Askari
- (Republic of Ireland) Paul Griffin
- (Chinese Taipei) Lau Kuan-hua
- (Republic of Ireland) David McCann
- (Iran) Ghader Mizbani
- (Chinese Taipei) Peng Kuei-hsiang

Japan

- (Japan) Takumi Beppu
- (Japan) Koji Fukushima
- (Japan) Shinichi Fukushima
- (Japan) Takashi Miyazawa
- (Japan) Kazuhiro Mori
- (Japan) Taiji Nishitani
