= 2005 Tour de Langkawi =

2005 UCI Asia Tour

Race details
- Dates: 28 January – 6 February 2005
- Stages: 10
- Distance: 1,284.6 km (798.2 mi)
- Winning time: 30h 18' 18"

Results
Jersey awarded to the overall winner	Winner	Ryan Cox (RSA)	(Barloworld)
	Second	José Rujano (VEN)	(Colombia–Selle Italia)
	Third	Tiaan Kannemeyer (RSA)	(Barloworld)
Jersey awarded to the points classification winner	Points	Graeme Brown (AUS)	(Ceramica Panaria–Navigare)
Jersey awarded to the mountains classification winner	Mountains	Ryan Cox (RSA)	(Barloworld)
	Team	Barloworld	

The 2005 Tour de Langkawi was the 10th edition of the Tour de Langkawi, a cycling stage race that took place in Malaysia. It began on 28 January in Langkawi and ended on 6 February in Kuala Lumpur. The race was rated by the Union Cycliste Internationale (UCI) as a 2.HC (hors category) race on the 2005 UCI Asia Tour calendar.

Ryan Cox of South Africa won the race, followed by José Rujano of Venezuela second and Tiaan Kannemeyer of South Africa third. Graeme Brown won the points classification category and Cox won the mountains classification category. Barloworld won the team classification category.

== Stages ==
The cyclists competed in 10 stages, covering a distance of 1,284.6 kilometres.

Stage	Date	Course	Distance	Stage result		
Stage	Date	Course	Distance	Winner	Second	Third
1	28 January	Langkawi	106.9 km (66.4 mi)	Graeme Brown (AUS)	Guillermo Bongiorno (ARG)	Oleg Grishkin (RUS)
2	29 January	Kangar to Kepala Batas	171.6 km (106.6 mi)	Guillermo Bongiorno (ARG)	Graeme Brown (AUS)	Oleg Grishkin (RUS)
3	30 January	Gerik to Tanah Merah	172.5 km (107.2 mi)	Koji Fukushima (JPN)	Denis Bertolini (ITA)	Graeme Brown (AUS)
4	31 January	Bachok Individual time trial	20.3 km (12.6 mi)	Nathan O'Neill (AUS)	Ryan Cox (RSA)	José Rujano (VEN)
5	1 February	Kota Bharu to Kuala Terengganu	163.9 km (101.8 mi)	Graeme Brown (AUS)	Guillermo Bongiorno (ARG)	Brett Lancaster (AUS)
6	2 February	Kuala Berang to Chukai	152.0 km (94.4 mi)	Guillermo Bongiorno (ARG)	Graeme Brown (AUS)	Antonio Salomone (ITA)
7	3 February	Maran to Raub	167.7 km (104.2 mi)	Graeme Brown (AUS)	Moreno Di Biase (ITA)	Steffen Radochla (GER)
8	4 February	Kuala Kubu Bharu to Genting Highlands	97.9 km (60.8 mi)	Ryan Cox (RSA)	José Rujano (VEN)	Julio Alberto Pérez (MEX)
9	5 February	KL Tower to Putrajaya	164.8 km (102.4 mi)	Graeme Brown (AUS)	Antonio Salomone (ITA)	Brett Lancaster (AUS)
10	6 February	Kuala Lumpur Criterium	67 km (41.6 mi)	Graeme Brown (AUS)	Guillermo Bongiorno (ARG)	Oleg Grishkin (RUS)

== Classification leadership ==
Stage	Stage winner	General classification	Points classification	Mountains classification	Asian rider classification	Team classification	Asian team classification
1	Graeme Brown	Graeme Brown	Graeme Brown	Kristian House	Koji Fukushima	Landbouwkrediet–Colnago	Iran
2	Guillermo Bongiorno	Graeme Brown	Graeme Brown	Kristian House	Takashi Miyazawa	Domina Vacanze	Iran
3	Koji Fukushima	Koji Fukushima	Graeme Brown	Koji Fukushima	Koji Fukushima	Bridgestone Anchor	Bridgestone Anchor
4	Nathan O'Neill	Koji Fukushima	Graeme Brown	Koji Fukushima	Koji Fukushima	Barloworld	Bridgestone Anchor
5	Graeme Brown	Koji Fukushima	Graeme Brown	Koji Fukushima	Koji Fukushima	Barloworld	Bridgestone Anchor
6	Guillermo Bongiorno	Koji Fukushima	Graeme Brown	Kristian House	Koji Fukushima	Barloworld	Bridgestone Anchor
7	Graeme Brown	Koji Fukushima	Graeme Brown	Kristian House	Koji Fukushima	Barloworld	Bridgestone Anchor
8	Ryan Cox	Ryan Cox	Graeme Brown	Kristian House	Koji Fukushima	Barloworld	Iran
9	Graeme Brown	Ryan Cox	Graeme Brown	Ryan Cox	Koji Fukushima	Barloworld	Iran
10	Graeme Brown	Ryan Cox	Graeme Brown	Ryan Cox	Koji Fukushima	Barloworld	Iran
Final		Ryan Cox	Graeme Brown	Ryan Cox	Koji Fukushima	Barloworld	Iran

== Final standings ==
=== General classification ===
	Rider	Team	Time
1	Ryan Cox (RSA)	Barloworld	30h 18' 18"
2	José Rujano (VEN)	Colombia–Selle Italia	+ 18"
3	Tiaan Kannemeyer (RSA)	Barloworld	+ 01' 34"
4	Cesar Grajales (COL)	Navigators Insurance	+ 02' 52"
5	Tom Danielson (USA)	Discovery Channel	+ 03' 01"
6	Jurgen Van de Walle (BEL)	Landbouwkrediet–Colnago	+ 03' 44"
7	Marlon Pérez Arango (COL)	Colombia–Selle Italia	+ 04' 07"
8	Sergio Ghisalberti (ITA)	Domina Vacanze	+ 04' 08"
9	Jesús Hernández (ESP)	Liberty Seguros–Würth	+ 04' 17"
10	Giuseppe Palumbo (ITA)	Acqua & Sapone–Adria Mobil	+ 04' 46"

=== Points classification ===
	Rider	Team	Points
1	Graeme Brown (AUS)	Ceramica Panaria–Navigare	129
2	Oleg Grishkin (RUS)	Navigators Insurance	87
3	Guillermo Bongiorno (ARG)	Ceramica Panaria–Navigare	85
4	Antonio Salomone (ITA)	Barloworld	59
5	Koji Fukushima (JPN)	Bridgestone Anchor	50
5	James Van Landschoot (BEL)	Landbouwkrediet–Colnago	50
7	Geoffroy Lequatre (FRA)	Crédit Agricole	46
8	Brett Lancaster (AUS)	Ceramica Panaria–Navigare	42
8	Moreno Di Biase (ITA)	Colombia–Selle Italia	42
10	Steffen Radochla (GER)	MrBookmaker.com–SportsTech	41

=== Mountains classification ===
	Rider	Team	Points
1	Ryan Cox (RSA)	Barloworld	37
2	Koji Fukushima (JPN)	Bridgestone Anchor	37
3	Kristian House (GBR)	Great Britain	33
4	José Rujano (VEN)	Colombia–Selle Italia	32
5	Adam Wadecki (POL)	Action–Ati	26
6	Marlon Pérez Arango (COL)	Colombia–Selle Italia	25
7	Eric Leblacher (FRA)	Crédit Agricole	19
7	René Jørgensen (DEN)	Barloworld	19
9	David Kopp (GER)	Wiesenhof	18
9	Tiaan Kannemeyer (RSA)	Barloworld	18

=== Asian rider classification ===
	Rider	Team	Time
1	Koji Fukushima (JPN)	Bridgestone Anchor	30h 24' 35"
2	Tonton Susanto (INA)	Wismilak	+ 01"
3	Ahad Kazemi (IRI)	Iran	+ 01' 57"
4	Ghader Mizbani (IRI)	Iran	+ 03' 08"
5	Hossein Askari (IRI)	Iran	+ 03' 41"
6	Shinichi Fukushima (JPN)	Bridgestone Anchor	+ 08' 15"
7	Shahrulneeza Razali (MAS)	Malaysia	+ 08' 28"
8	Mehdi Sohrabi (IRI)	Iran	+ 08' 58"
9	Suhardi Hassan (MAS)	Proton T-Bikes	+ 11' 13"
10	Yasutaka Tashiro (JPN)	Bridgestone Anchor	+ 28' 40"

=== Team classification ===
	Team	Time
1	Barloworld	91h 03' 23"
2	Colombia–Selle Italia	+ 02' 30"
3	Crédit Agricole	+ 06' 27"
4	Navigators Insurance	+ 06' 34"
5	Discovery Channel	+ 06' 49"
6	Liberty Seguros–Würth	+ 08' 33"
7	Domina Vacanze	+ 09' 42"
8	Ceramica Panaria–Navigare	+ 12' 55"
9	Iran	+ 16' 16"
10	MrBookmaker.com–SportsTech	+ 17' 36"

=== Asian team classification ===
	Team	Time
1	Iran	91h 19' 39"
2	Bridgestone Anchor	+ 09' 29"
3	Proton T-Bikes	+ 55' 33"
4	Malaysia	+ 1h 04' 38"

== List of teams and riders ==
A total of 20 teams were invited to participate in the 2005 Tour de Langkawi. Out of the 140 riders, a total of 101 riders made it to the finish in Kuala Lumpur.

Colombia–Selle Italia

- (Colombia) Marlon Pérez Arango
- (Italy) Moreno Di Biase
- (Italy) Raffaele Illiano
- (Venezuela) José Rujano
- (Italy) Leonardo Scarselli
- (Australia) Russel Van Hout
- (Australia) Trent Wilson

Crédit Agricole

- (New Zealand) Julian Dean
- (France) Eric Leblacher
- (France) Christophe Le Mével
- (France) Geoffroy Lequatre
- (United States) Saul Raisin
- (France) Yannick Talabardon
- (France) Nicolas Vogondy

Discovery Channel

- (Canada) Michael Barry
- (Japan) Fumiyuki Beppu
- (United States) Michael Creed
- (United States) Antonio Cruz
- (United States) Tom Danielson
- (United States) Patrick McCarty
- (New Zealand) Hayden Roulston

Domina Vacanze

- (Italy) Ruggero Borghi
- (Italy) Cristian Bonfanti
- (Italy) Sergio Ghisalberti
- (Italy) Enrico Grigoli
- (Kazakhstan) Maxim Iglinsky
- (Slovakia) Matej Jurčo
- (Italy) Luca Solari

Liberty Seguros–Würth

- (Spain) Joseba Beloki
- (Czech Republic) René Andrle
- (Poland) Dariusz Baranowski
- (Netherlands) Koen de Kort
- (Spain) Jesús Hernández
- (Germany) Jörg Jaksche
- (Portugal) Nuno Ribeiro

Acqua & Sapone–Adria Mobil

- (Italy) Claudio Astolfi
- (Italy) Denis Bertolini
- (Italy) Antonio Bucciero
- (Italy) Alessandro D'Andrea
- (Ukraine) Valery Kobzarenko
- (Italy) Giuseppe Palumbo
- (Italy) Leonardo Moser

Action–Ati

- (Ukraine) Bogdan Bondariew
- (Poland) Marcin Osinski
- (Poland) Piotr Chmielewski
- (Germany) Dennis Kraft
- (Poland) Zbigniew Piątek
- (Poland) Kazimierz Stafiej
- (Poland) Adam Wadecki

Barloworld

- (United Kingdom) Tom Southam
- (South Africa) Ryan Cox
- (South Africa) Rodney Green
- (South Africa) Tiaan Kannemeyer
- (Spain) David Plaza
- (Italy) Antonio Salomone
- (Denmark) René Jørgensen

Ceramica Panaria–Navigare

- (Italy) Mirko Allegrini
- (Italy) Fortunato Baliani
- (Argentina) Guillermo Bongiorno
- (Australia) Graeme Brown
- (Australia) Brett Lancaster
- (Ukraine) Sergiy Matveyev
- (Mexico) Julio Alberto Pérez

Landbouwkrediet–Colnago

- (Belgium) Johan Verstrepen
- (Belgium) Geert Verheyen
- (Belgium) Grégory Habeaux
- (Belgium) Sven Renders
- (Belgium) Nico Sijmens
- (Belgium) James Van Landschoot
- (Belgium) Jurgen Van de Walle

MrBookmaker.com–SportsTech

- (Netherlands) Stefan van Dijk
- (France) Frédéric Gabriel
- (Belgium) Sven Renders
- (France) Camille Bouquet
- (Australia) Benjamin Day
- (Belgium) Kurt Van De Wouwer
- (Belgium) Peter Wuyts

Navigators Insurance

- (Russia) Vassili Davidenko
- (Colombia) Cesar Grajales
- (Russia) Oleg Grishkin
- (United States) Jeffry Louder
- (Australia) Nathan O'Neill
- (Canada) Mark Walters

Wiesenhof

- (Germany) Ralf Grabsch
- (Germany) Jens Heppner
- (Germany) David Kopp
- (Germany) Martin Müller
- (Germany) Enrico Poitschke
- (Germany) Steffen Radochla
- (Germany) Lars Wackernagel

Proton T-Bikes

- (Malaysia) Fallanie Ali
- (Malaysia) Suhardi Hassan
- (Malaysia) Wan Mohammad Najmee
- (Malaysia) Ng Yong Li
- (Malaysia) Mohd Fauzan Ahmad Lutfi
- (Malaysia) Razif Jaffar
- (Malaysia) Mohd Jasmin Ruslan

Bridgestone Anchor

- (Japan) Shinichi Fukushima
- (Japan) Koji Fukushima
- (Japan) Takehiro Mizutani
- (Japan) Takashi Miyazawa
- (Japan) Miyataka Shimizu
- (Japan) Yasutaka Tashiro
- (Japan) Shinji Suzuki

Wismilak

- (Indonesia) Tonton Susanto
- (Australia) David McKenzie
- (Indonesia) Wawan Setyobudi
- (Indonesia) Sama'i Sama'i
- (Australia) Christopher Bradford
- (Indonesia) Matnur Matnur
- (Indonesia) Adi Wibowo

Great Britain

- (United Kingdom) Rob Hayles
- (United Kingdom) Kristian House
- (United Kingdom) Chris Newton
- (United Kingdom) Paul Manning
- (United Kingdom) Dean Downing
- (United Kingdom) Thomas White
- (United Kingdom) Julian Winn

Iran

- (Iran) Hassan Maleki
- (Iran) Ahad Kazemi
- (Iran) Ghader Mizbani
- (Iran) Alireza Haghi
- (Iran) Hossein Askari
- (Iran) Moezeddin Seyed-Rezaei
- (Iran) Mehdi Sohrabi

Republic of Ireland

- (Republic of Ireland) David McCann
- (Republic of Ireland) Paul Healion
- (Republic of Ireland) Stephen Gallagher
- (Republic of Ireland) Paidi O'Brien
- (Republic of Ireland) Roger Aitken
- (Republic of Ireland) Paul Griffin
- (Republic of Ireland) Seán Lacey

Malaysia

- (Malaysia) Shahrulneeza Razali
- (Malaysia) Mohd Mahadzir Hamad
- (Malaysia) Mohd Yusof Abd Nasir
- (Malaysia) Musairi Musa
- (Malaysia) Nor Effendy Rosli
- (Malaysia) Mohd Fuad Daud
- (Malaysia) Mohd Rizal Ramle
