= 2009 Tour of Britain =

UCI Europe Tour
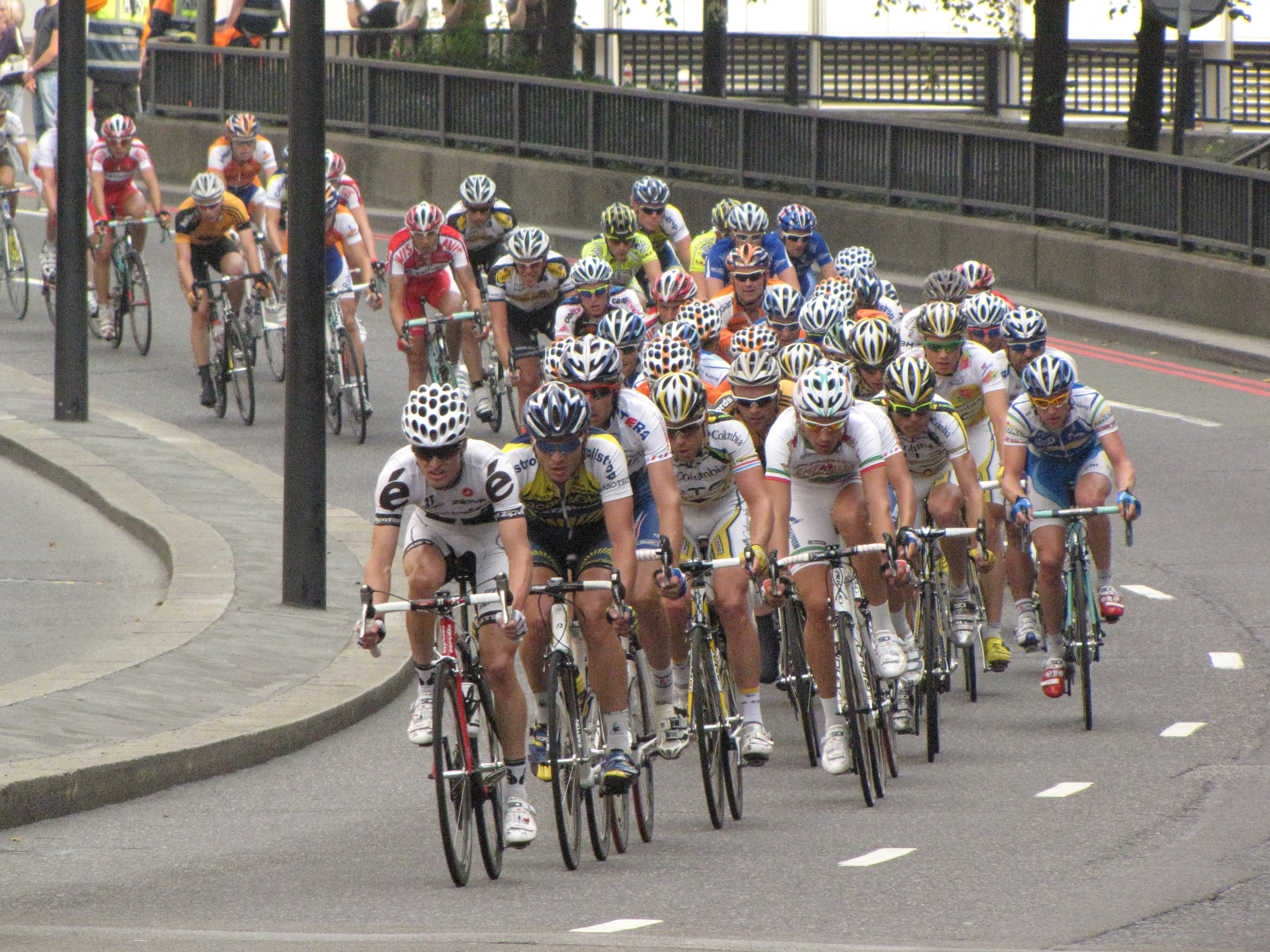
- Stage 8 of the 2009 Tour of Britain in London.

Race details
- Dates: 12–19 September 2009
- Stages: 8
- Distance: 1,201 km (746.3 mi)
- Winning time: 28h 06' 24"

Results
Jersey awarded to the overall winner	Winner	Edvald Boasson Hagen (NOR)	(Team Columbia – HTC)
	Second	Christopher Sutton (AUS)	(Garmin–Slipstream)
	Third	Martin Reimer (GER)	(Cervelo Test Team)
Jersey awarded to the points classification winner	Points	Edvald Boasson Hagen (NOR)	(Team Columbia – HTC)
Jersey awarded to the mountains classification winner	Mountains	Thomas De Gendt (BEL)	(Topsport Vlaanderen)
Jersey awarded to the sprints classification winner	Sprints	Thomas De Gendt (BEL)	(Topsport Vlaanderen)
	Team	Rabobank	

The 2009 Tour of Britain was a UCI 2.1 category race of eight stages from 12 September till 19 September 2009. The race was the sixth edition of the latest version of the Tour of Britain and the seventieth British tour in total. It formed part of the 2008–2009 UCI Europe Tour. The race begun in Scunthorpe and ended with a circuit stage in London.

== Participating teams ==
The 16 teams which participated in the race were:

UCI ProTour Teams

- A2R – Ag2r–La Mondiale
- EUS – Euskaltel–Euskadi
- GRM – Garmin–Slipstream
- KAT – Team Katusha
- RAB – Rabobank
- THR – Team Columbia–HTC

UCI Professional Continental Teams

- BAR – Barloworld
- CTT – Cervélo TestTeam
- CSF – CSF Group–Navigare
- ISD – ISD–NERI
- TSV – Topsport Vlaanderen–Mercator
- VAC – Vacansoleil
- AGR – Agritubel

UCI Continental Teams

- CTV – CandiTV–Marshalls Pasta
- HAF – Team Halfords Bikehut
- RCR – Rapha Condor
- TMB – Joker–Bianchi

== Stages ==
=== Stage 1 ===
12 September 2009 – Scunthorpe to York, 172 km (107 mi)

The first stage win was taken by Christopher Sutton (Garmin–Slipstream) after the peloton caught a long breakaway by Martin Mortensen (Vacansoleil) and Thomas De Gendt (Topsport Vlaanderen).

Stage 1 Result

	Rider	Team	Time
1	Christopher Sutton (AUS)	Garmin–Slipstream	4h 07' 59"
2	Michele Merlo (ITA)	Barloworld	s.t.
3	Ben Swift (GBR)	Team Katusha	s.t.
4	Russell Downing (GBR)	Candi TV-Marshalls Pasta RT	s.t.
5	Pieter Vanspeybrouck (BEL)	Topsport Vlaanderen–Mercator	s.t.
6	Reinier Honig (NED)	Vacansoleil	s.t.
7	Martin Reimer (GER)	Cervélo TestTeam	s.t.
8	Lloyd Mondory (FRA)	Ag2r–La Mondiale	s.t.
9	Ian Wilkinson (GBR)	Team Halfords Bikehut	s.t.
10	Tim Mertens (BEL)	Topsport Vlaanderen–Mercator	s.t.

General Classification after Stage 1

	Rider	Team	Time
1	Christopher Sutton (AUS)	Garmin–Slipstream	4h 07' 49"
2	Michele Merlo (ITA)	Barloworld	+ 4"
3	Martin Mortensen (DEN)	Vacansoleil	s.t.
4	Ben Swift (GBR)	Team Katusha	+ 6"
5	Russell Downing (GBR)	Candi TV-Marshalls Pasta RT	+ 9"
6	Alexander Kristoff (NOR)	Team Joker Bianchi	s.t.
7	Edvald Boasson Hagen (NOR)	Team Columbia–HTC	s.t.
8	Pieter Vanspeybrouck (BEL)	Topsport Vlaanderen–Mercator	+ 10"
9	Reinier Honig (NED)	Vacansoleil	s.t.
10	Martin Reimer (GER)	Cervélo TestTeam	s.t.

=== Stage 2 ===
13 September 2009 – Darlington to Gateshead, 153.3 km (95.3 mi)

Stage 2 Result

	Rider	Team	Time
1	Kai Reus (NED)	Rabobank	3h 38' 32"
2	Alexander Kristoff (NOR)	Team Joker Bianchi	+ 9"
3	Edvald Boasson Hagen (NOR)	Team Columbia–HTC	s.t.
4	Martin Reimer (GER)	Cervélo TestTeam	s.t.
5	Danilo Napolitano (ITA)	Team Katusha	s.t.
6	Michele Merlo (ITA)	Barloworld	s.t.
7	Malcolm Elliott (GBR)	Candi TV-Marshalls Pasta RT	s.t.
8	Pierpaolo De Negri (ITA)	ISD–NERI	s.t.
9	Christopher Sutton (AUS)	Garmin–Slipstream	s.t.
10	Pieter Vanspeybrouck (BEL)	Topsport Vlaanderen–Mercator	s.t.

General Classification after Stage 2

	Rider	Team	Time
1	Kai Reus (NED)	Rabobank	7h 46' 14"
2	Christopher Sutton (AUS)	Garmin–Slipstream	+ 16"
3	Alexander Kristoff (NOR)	Team Joker Bianchi	+ 19"
4	Michele Merlo (ITA)	Barloworld	+ 20"
5	Edvald Boasson Hagen (NOR)	Team Columbia–HTC	+ 21"
6	Russell Downing (GBR)	Candi TV-Marshalls Pasta RT	+ 25"
7	Martin Reimer (GER)	Cervélo TestTeam	+ 26"
8	Pieter Vanspeybrouck (BEL)	Topsport Vlaanderen–Mercator	s.t.
9	Malcolm Elliott (GBR)	Candi TV-Marshalls Pasta RT	s.t.
10	Reinier Honig (NED)	Vacansoleil	s.t.

=== Stage 3 ===
14 September 2009 – Peebles to Gretna Green, 153.8 km (95.6 mi)

Stage 3 Result

	Rider	Team	Time
1	Edvald Boasson Hagen (NOR)	Team Columbia–HTC	3h 38' 01"
2	Michele Merlo (ITA)	Barloworld	s.t.
3	Christopher Sutton (AUS)	Garmin–Slipstream	s.t.
4	Danilo Napolitano (ITA)	Team Katusha	s.t.
5	Davide Appollonio (ITA)	Cervélo TestTeam	s.t.
6	Russell Downing (GBR)	Candi TV-Marshalls Pasta RT	s.t.
7	Alexander Kristoff (NOR)	Team Joker Bianchi	s.t.
8	Pierpaolo De Negri (ITA)	ISD–NERI	s.t.
9	Graeme Brown (AUS)	Rabobank	s.t.
10	Geraint Thomas (GBR)	Barloworld	s.t.

General Classification after Stage 3

	Rider	Team	Time
1	Kai Reus (NED)	Rabobank	11h 24' 15"
2	Edvald Boasson Hagen (NOR)	Team Columbia–HTC	+ 11"
3	Christopher Sutton (AUS)	Garmin–Slipstream	+ 12"
4	Michele Merlo (ITA)	Barloworld	+ 14"
5	Martin Reimer (GER)	Cervélo TestTeam	+ 17"
6	Alexander Kristoff (NOR)	Team Joker Bianchi	+ 19"
7	Rob Ruygh (NED)	Vacansoleil	+ 23"
8	Russell Downing (GBR)	Candi TV-Marshalls Pasta RT	+ 25"
9	Danilo Napolitano (ITA)	Team Katusha	+ 26"
10	Pieter Vanspeybrouck (BEL)	Topsport Vlaanderen–Mercator	s.t.

=== Stage 4 ===
15 September 2009 – Stanley Park, Blackpool to Blackpool, 148 km (92 mi)

Stage 4 Result

	Rider	Team	Time
1	Edvald Boasson Hagen (NOR)	Team Columbia–HTC	3h 32' 04"
2	Christopher Sutton (AUS)	Garmin–Slipstream	s.t.
3	Martin Reimer (GER)	Cervélo TestTeam	s.t.
4	Russell Downing (GBR)	Candi TV-Marshalls Pasta RT	s.t.
5	Koldo Fernández (ESP)	Euskaltel–Euskadi	s.t.
6	Tony Martin (GER)	Team Columbia–HTC	s.t.
7	Renaud Dion (FRA)	Ag2r–La Mondiale	s.t.
8	Mauro Finetto (ITA)	CSF Group–Navigare	s.t.
9	Graham Briggs (GBR)	Candi TV-Marshalls Pasta RT	s.t.
10	Malcolm Elliott (GBR)	Candi TV-Marshalls Pasta RT	s.t.

General Classification after Stage 4

	Rider	Team	Time
1	Kai Reus (NED)	Rabobank	14h 56' 19"
2	Edvald Boasson Hagen (NOR)	Team Columbia–HTC	+ 1"
3	Christopher Sutton (AUS)	Garmin–Slipstream	+ 5"
4	Martin Reimer (GER)	Cervélo TestTeam	+ 11"
5	Michele Merlo (ITA)	Barloworld	+ 14"
6	Alexander Kristoff (NOR)	Team Joker Bianchi	+ 19"
7	Simon Clarke (AUS)	ISD–NERI	+ 21"
8	Reinier Honig (NED)	Vacansoleil	+ 23"
9	Rob Ruygh (NED)	Vacansoleil	s.t.
10	Geoffroy Lequatre (FRA)	Agritubel	s.t.

=== Stage 5 ===
16 September 2009 – Britannia Stadium to Stoke-on-Trent, 134 km (83 mi)

Stage 5 Result

	Rider	Team	Time
1	Edvald Boasson Hagen (NOR)	Team Columbia–HTC	3h 15' 57"
2	Filippo Pozzato (ITA)	Team Katusha	s.t.
3	Russell Downing (GBR)	Candi TV-Marshalls Pasta RT	s.t.
4	Aitor Galdós (ESP)	Euskaltel–Euskadi	s.t.
5	Simon Clarke (AUS)	ISD–NERI	s.t.
6	Reinier Honig (NED)	Vacansoleil	s.t.
7	Pierpaolo De Negri (ITA)	ISD–NERI	s.t.
8	Carlo Scognamiglio (ITA)	Barloworld	s.t.
9	Christopher Sutton (AUS)	Garmin–Slipstream	s.t.
10	Mauro Finetto (ITA)	CSF Group–Navigare	s.t.

General Classification after Stage 5

	Rider	Team	Time
1	Edvald Boasson Hagen (NOR)	Team Columbia–HTC	18h 12' 07"
2	Kai Reus (NED)	Rabobank	+ 9"
3	Christopher Sutton (AUS)	Garmin–Slipstream	+ 14"
4	Martin Reimer (GER)	Cervélo TestTeam	+ 17"
5	Russell Downing (GBR)	Candi TV-Marshalls Pasta RT	+ 29"
6	Simon Clarke (AUS)	ISD–NERI	+ 30"
7	Geoffroy Lequatre (FRA)	Agritubel	s.t.
8	Reinier Honig (NED)	Vacansoleil	+ 32"
9	Rob Ruygh (NED)	Vacansoleil	s.t.
10	Federico Canuti (ITA)	CSF Group–Navigare	+ 34"

=== Stage 6 ===
17 September 2009 – Frome to Bideford, 183.7 km (114.1 mi)

Stage 6 Result

	Rider	Team	Time
1	Edvald Boasson Hagen (NOR)	Team Columbia–HTC	4h 05' 20"
2	Martin Reimer (GER)	Cervélo TestTeam	s.t.
3	Russell Downing (GBR)	Candi TV-Marshalls Pasta RT	s.t.
4	Koldo Fernández (ESP)	Euskaltel–Euskadi	s.t.
5	Pierpaolo De Negri (ITA)	ISD–NERI	s.t.
6	Michele Merlo (ITA)	Barloworld	s.t.
7	Christopher Sutton (AUS)	Garmin–Slipstream	s.t.
8	Reinier Honig (NED)	Vacansoleil	s.t.
9	Alan Marangoni (ITA)	CSF Group–Navigare	s.t.
10	Davide Appollonio (ITA)	Cervélo TestTeam	s.t.

General Classification after Stage 6

	Rider	Team	Time
1	Edvald Boasson Hagen (NOR)	Team Columbia–HTC	22h 17' 17"
2	Kai Reus (NED)	Rabobank	+ 19"
3	Martin Reimer (GER)	Cervélo TestTeam	+ 21"
4	Christopher Sutton (AUS)	Garmin–Slipstream	+ 24"
5	Russell Downing (GBR)	Candi TV-Marshalls Pasta RT	+ 35"
6	Geraint Thomas (GBR)	Barloworld	+ 36"
7	Geoffroy Lequatre (FRA)	Agritubel	+ 40"
8	Simon Clarke (AUS)	ISD–NERI	s.t.
9	Reinier Honig (NED)	Vacansoleil	+ 42"
10	Serge Pauwels (BEL)	Cervélo TestTeam	s.t.

=== Stage 7 ===
18 September 2009 – Hatherleigh to Yeovil, 159.7 km (99.2 mi)

Stage 7 Result

	Rider	Team	Time
1	Ben Swift (GBR)	Team Katusha	3h 52' 19"
2	Filippo Pozzato (ITA)	Team Katusha	s.t.
3	Edvald Boasson Hagen (NOR)	Team Columbia–HTC	s.t.
4	Mauro Finetto (ITA)	CSF Group–Navigare	s.t.
5	Alan Marangoni (ITA)	CSF Group–Navigare	s.t.
6	Geraint Thomas (GBR)	Barloworld	s.t.
7	Kai Reus (NED)	Rabobank	s.t.
8	Christopher Sutton (AUS)	Garmin–Slipstream	s.t.
9	Kristof Vandewalle (BEL)	Topsport Vlaanderen–Mercator	s.t.
10	Huub Duyn (NED)	Garmin–Slipstream	s.t.

General Classification after Stage 7

	Rider	Team	Time
1	Edvald Boasson Hagen (NOR)	Team Columbia–HTC	26h 09' 32"
2	Kai Reus (NED)	Rabobank	+ 23"
3	Martin Reimer (GER)	Cervélo TestTeam	+ 25"
4	Christopher Sutton (AUS)	Garmin–Slipstream	+ 28"
5	Russell Downing (GBR)	Candi TV-Marshalls Pasta RT	+ 37"
6	Geraint Thomas (GBR)	Barloworld	+ 40"
7	Geoffroy Lequatre (FRA)	Agritubel	+ 43"
8	Simon Clarke (AUS)	ISD–NERI	+ 44"
9	Reinier Honig (NED)	Vacansoleil	+ 46"
10	Kristian House (GBR)	Rapha Condor	s.t.

=== Stage 8 ===
19 September 2009 – Whitehall, Westminster to Whitehall, Westminster, 92.5 km (57.5 mi)

Stage 8 Result

	Rider	Team	Time
1	Michele Merlo (ITA)	Barloworld	1h 56' 55"
2	Koldo Fernández (ESP)	Euskaltel–Euskadi	s.t.
3	Christopher Sutton (AUS)	Garmin–Slipstream	s.t.
4	Pierpaolo De Negri (ITA)	ISD–NERI	s.t.
5	Rob Hayles (GBR)	Team Halfords Bikehut	s.t.
6	Russell Downing (GBR)	Candi TV-Marshalls Pasta RT	s.t.
7	Reinier Honig (NED)	Vacansoleil	s.t.
8	Peter Williams (GBR)	Candi TV-Marshalls Pasta RT	s.t.
9	Malcolm Elliott (GBR)	Candi TV-Marshalls Pasta RT	s.t.
10	Danilo Napolitano (ITA)	Team Katusha	s.t.

Final General Classification

	Rider	Team	Time
1	Edvald Boasson Hagen (NOR)	Team Columbia–HTC	28h 06' 24"
2	Christopher Sutton (AUS)	Garmin–Slipstream	+ 23"
3	Martin Reimer (GER)	Cervélo TestTeam	+ 25"
4	Kai Reus (NED)	Rabobank	+ 26"
5	Russell Downing (GBR)	Candi TV-Marshalls Pasta RT	+ 39"
6	Geraint Thomas (GBR)	Barloworld	+ 43"
7	Geoffroy Lequatre (FRA)	Agritubel	s.t.
8	Simon Clarke (AUS)	ISD–NERI	+ 47"
9	Reinier Honig (NED)	Vacansoleil	+ 49"
10	Kristian House (GBR)	Rapha Condor	s.t.

== Jersey progress ==
Stage	Winner	General classification	Sprint Classification	Mountains Classification	Points Classification	Team Classification
1	Christopher Sutton	Christopher Sutton	Thomas De Gendt	Martin Mortensen	Christopher Sutton	Cervélo Test Team
2	Kai Reus	Kai Reus	Thomas De Gendt	Thomas De Gendt	Michele Merlo	Rabobank
3	Edvald Boasson Hagen	Kai Reus	Thomas De Gendt	Thomas De Gendt	Michele Merlo	Rabobank
4	Edvald Boasson Hagen	Kai Reus	Thomas De Gendt	Thomas De Gendt	Christopher Sutton	Rabobank
5	Edvald Boasson Hagen	Edvald Boasson Hagen	Thomas De Gendt	Thomas De Gendt	Edvald Boasson Hagen	Rabobank
6	Edvald Boasson Hagen	Edvald Boasson Hagen	Thomas De Gendt	Thomas De Gendt	Edvald Boasson Hagen	Rabobank
7	Ben Swift	Edvald Boasson Hagen	Thomas De Gendt	Thomas De Gendt	Edvald Boasson Hagen	Rabobank
8	Michele Merlo	Edvald Boasson Hagen	Thomas De Gendt	Thomas De Gendt	Edvald Boasson Hagen	Rabobank
Final		Edvald Boasson Hagen	Thomas De Gendt	Thomas De Gendt	Edvald Boasson Hagen	Rabobank
