= 2005 UCI Africa Tour =

- First edition of the UCI Africa Tour

Details
- Dates: 16 February 2005–2 October 2006
- Location: Africa
- Races: 4

Champions
- Individual champion: Tiaan Kannemeyer (RSA) (Barloworld)
- Teams' champion: Barloworld
- Nations' champion: South Africa

The 2005 UCI Africa Tour was the first season of the UCI Africa Tour. The season began on 16 February 2005 with the Tour d'Egypte and ended on 2 October 2005 with the Tour du Sénégal.

Tiaan Kannemeyer of South Africa was crowned as the 2005 UCI Africa Tour champion.

Throughout the season, points are awarded to the top finishers of stages within stage races and the final general classification standings of each of the stages races and one-day events. The quality and complexity of a race also determines how many points are awarded to the top finishers, the higher the UCI rating of a race, the more points are awarded. The UCI ratings from highest to lowest are as follows:

- Multi-day events: 2.HC, 2.1 and 2.2
- One-day events: 1.HC, 1.1 and 1.2

== Events ==
Date	Race name	Location	UCI Rating	Winner	Team
16–24 February	Tour d'Egypte	Egypt	2.2	Sergey Tretyakov (KAZ)	
26 February–12 March	Tour du Cameroun	Cameroon	2.2	Davide Silvestri (ITA)	
9–13 March	Giro del Capo	South Africa	2.2	Tiaan Kannemeyer (RSA)	
22 March–2 April	Tour du Sénégal	Senegal	2.2	Alexandre Lecocq (FRA)	

== Final standings ==
=== Individual classification ===
Rank	Name	Points
1.	Tiaan Kannemeyer (RSA)	163
2.	Ryan Cox (RSA)	151
3.	Rabaki Jérémie Ouédraogo (BUR)	100
4.	Davide Silvestri (ITA)	90
5.	Jamie Ball (RSA)	72.66
6.	Laurent Zongo (BUR)	72
7.	Christian Eminger (AUT)	58
8.	Sergey Tretyakov (KAZ)	45.66
9.	Sergey Lavrenenko (KAZ)	43.66
10.	Willie van Zyl (RSA)	42

=== Team classification ===
Rank	Team	Points
1.	Barloworld	327
2.	Team Nippo	130
3.	Team Konica Minolta	101
4.	Dukla Trenčín	37
5.	Team Exel	32.32
6.	Team Wiesenhof	28
7.	Team Lamonta	27
8.	Intel–Action	18
9.	Recycling.co.uk	13

=== Nation classification ===
Rank	Nation	Points
1.	South Africa	1049.32
2.	Burkina Faso	329
3.	Namibia	40
4.	Cameroon	22
5.	Tunisia	11.3
6.	Egypt	6
7.	Morocco	5
8.	Zimbabwe	5
9.	Eritrea	4
