= 2005 UCI Asia Tour =

Inaugural season of UCI Asia

- First edition of the UCI Asia Tour

Details
- Dates: 16 January 2005–19 September 2005
- Location: Asia
- Races: 13

Champions
- Individual champion: Andrey Mizurov (KAZ) (Cycling Team Capec)
- Teams' champion: Giant Asia Racing Team
- Nations' champion: Kazakhstan

The 2005 UCI Asia Tour was the first season of the UCI Asia Tour. The season began on 16 January 2005 with the Tour of Siam and ended on 19 September 2005 with the Tour de Hokkaido.

Andrey Mizurov of Kazakhstan was crowned as the 2005 UCI Asia Tour champion.

Throughout the season, points are awarded to the top finishers of stages within stage races and the final general classification standings of each of the stages races and one-day events. The quality and complexity of a race also determines how many points are awarded to the top finishers, the higher the UCI rating of a race, the more points are awarded.

The UCI ratings from highest to lowest are as follows:

- Multi-day events: 2.HC, 2.1 and 2.2
- One-day events: 1.HC, 1.1 and 1.2

== Events ==
Date	Race name	Location	UCI Rating	Winner	Team
16–21 January	Tour of Siam	Thailand	2.2	Shinichi Fukushima (JPN)	Bridgestone Anchor
28 January–6 February	Tour de Langkawi	Malaysia	2.HC	Ryan Cox (RSA)	Barloworld
29 January	International Grand Prix Doha	Qatar	1.1	Robert Hunter (RSA)	Phonak
31 January–4 February	Tour of Qatar	Qatar	2.1	Lars Michaelsen (DEN)	Team CSC
14–19 April	Kerman Tour	Iran	2.2	Hossein Askari (IRI)	Giant Asia Racing Team
7–13 May	Tour de Korea	South Korea	2.2	David McCann (IRL)	Giant Asia Racing Team
15–22 May	Tour of Japan	Japan	2.2	Félix Cárdenas (COL)	Barloworld
22 May–1 June	Azerbaïjan Tour	Iran	2.2	Ghader Mizbani (IRI)	Giant Asia Racing Team
27 June–1 July	Tour de East Java	Indonesia	2.2	Ahad Kazemi (IRI)	Giant Asia Racing Team
16–24 July	Tour of Qinghai Lake	China	2.HC	Martin Mareš (CZE)	eD'system ZVVZ
29–31 July	Tour of China	China	2.2	Andrey Mizurov (KAZ)	Cycling Team Capec
11–21 September	Tour d'Indonesia	Indonesia	2.2	Hossein Askari (IRI)	Giant Asia Racing Team
14–19 September	Tour de Hokkaido	Japan	2.2	Eddy Ratti (ITA)	Team Nippo

== Final standings ==
=== Individual classification ===
Rank	Name	Team	Points
1.	Andrey Mizurov (KAZ)	Cycling Team Capec	213
2.	Ryan Cox (RSA)	Barloworld	190
3.	Martin Mareš (CZE)	eD'system ZVVZ	174
4.	Hossein Askari (IRI)	Giant Asia Racing Team	168.66
5.	David McCann (IRL)	Giant Asia Racing Team	160.66
6.	Graeme Brown (AUS)	Ceramica Panaria–Navigare	156
7.	Mehdi Sohrabi (IRI)	Paykan	155.66
8.	Ghader Mizbani (IRI)	Giant Asia Racing Team	150.66
9.	Ahad Kazemi (IRI)	Giant Asia Racing Team	132.66
10.	Sergey Lagutin (UZB)	Landbouwkrediet–Colnago	120

=== Team classification ===
Rank	Team	Points
1.	Giant Asia Racing Team	796.64
2.	Cycling Team Capec	439
3.	Barloworld	429
4.	Paykan	314.64
5.	Ceramica Panaria–Navigare	271
6.	Bridgestone Anchor	261
7.	Marco Polo	237
8.	Team Nippo	227
9.	Naturino–Sapore di Mare	209
10.	Navigators Insurance	176

=== Nation classification ===
Rank	Nation	Points
1.	Kazakhstan	1005.28
2.	Iran	874.96
3.	Japan	744
4.	Uzbekistan	618
5.	South Korea	143
6.	Mongolia	127
7.	Hong Kong	79
8.	Indonesia	55
9.	Syria	43
10.	China	41
