= Scognamiglio =

Scognamiglio (pronounced [skoɲɲaˈmiʎʎo]) is an Italian surname from Campania, literally translating to 'millet-husker'. Notable people with the surname include:

- Carlo Scognamiglio (born 1944), Italian economist and politician
- Carlo Scognamiglio (cyclist) (born 1983), Italian cyclist
- Francesco Scognamiglio (born 1975), Italian fashion designer
- Gennaro Scognamiglio (born 1987), Italian footballer
- João Scognamiglio Clá Dias (1939–2024), Brazilian Roman Catholic priest and writer
- Vincenzo Scognamiglio (1920–1992), better known as Vincent Gardenia, Italian-American actor
