= Coppa Collecchio =

Bicycle race held in the Collecchio commune of Italy

Coordinates: 44.7576°N 10.2115°E

Race details
- Date: Mid September
- Region: Parma, Italy
- English name: Collecchio Cup
- Local name: Coppa Collecchio (in Italian)
- Discipline: Road
- Type: One-day race
- Organiser: G.S. Virtus Collecchio
- Web site: www.gsvirtuscollecchio.com/1/coppa_collecchio_3978229.html

History
- First edition: 1929
- Editions: 90 (as of 2026)
- First winner: Ettore Morellini (ITA)
- Most wins: Mario Sgrinzato (ITA) 3 wins
- Most recent: Leonardo Meccia (ITA)

The Coppa Collecchio is an annual one-day cycling race held in the Collecchio commune of Province of Parma, Italy. It is organized by G.S. Virtus Collecchio. In 2020 the race was cancelled due to COVID-19 pandemic.

== The route ==
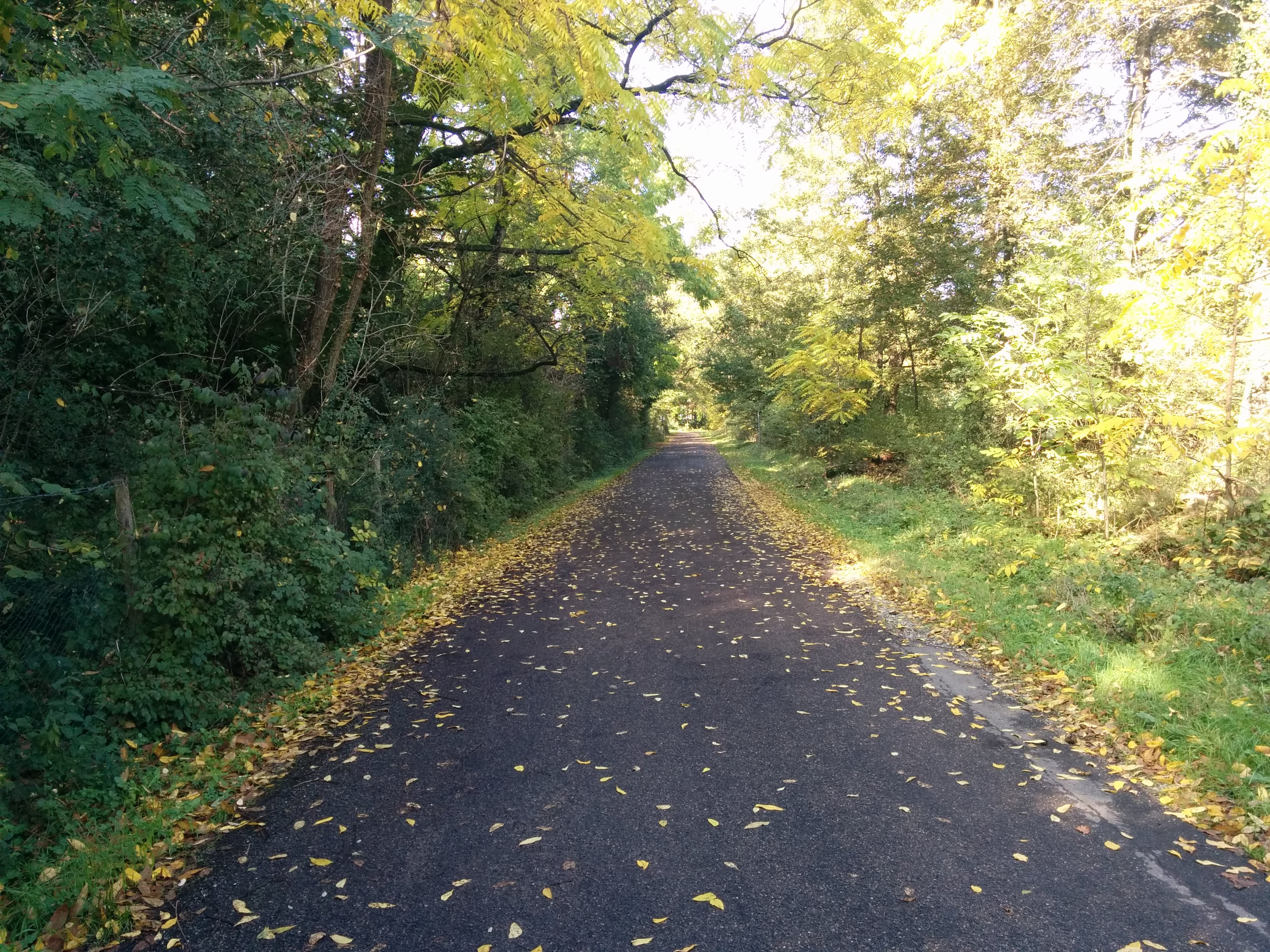
Route segment in Boschi di Carrega

Every year the route is almost the same. It commences in the square in front of Collecchio's historic Town Hall (Municipio). It features a demanding course with eight loops through the Parco naturale regionale dei Boschi di Carrega and three loops through Talignano, including a notable GPM (Gran Premio della Montagna) ascent at Segalara. The race concludes at the starting point.

== Book about Coppa Collecchio ==
In September 2016, a book was launched to commemorate the 80th anniversary of the event. The book "Coppa Collecchio, 80 years on two wheels" (Italian: Coppa Collecchio, 80 anni sulle due ruote) commemorates the rich history of the Coppa Collecchio cycling race, one of Italy's oldest, and includes details on winners and key cyclists. The event, now focused on elite and under-23 categories, has played a pivotal role in the careers of many cyclists. The presentation featured Stefano Risoli, President of G.S. Virtus Collecchio, Paolo Bianchi, Collecchio's Mayor, and Silvia Dondi, Sports Councilor of the Collecchio Municipality.

== Results ==
Year	Winner	Second	Third
1929	(Italy) Ettore Morellini		
1930	(Italy) Vasco Bergamaschi		
1931	(Italy) Mario Borsari		
1932	(Italy) Bruno Negri		
1933	(Italy) Edoardo Molinar		
1934	(Italy) Armando Zucchini		
1935	(Italy) Pietro Rimoldi	(Italy) Rinaldo Gerini	(Italy) Renato Scorticati
1936	(Italy) Aldo Postè		
1937	(Italy) Angelo Fava		
1938	(Italy) Corrado Ardizzoni		
1939	(Italy) Francesco De Rosa		
1940	(Italy) Arnaldo Cristofori		
1941	Not disputed due to World War II		
1942	(Italy) Federico Rozzi		
1943-1944	Not disputed due to World War II		
1945	(Italy) Giovanni Ronco		
1946	(Italy) Nello Spreafichi		
1947	(Italy) Luciano Pezzi		
1948	No race		
1949	(Italy) Gianni Ghidini		
1950	(Italy) Angelo Venturoli		
1951	(Italy) Renzo Cella		
1952	(Italy) Aldo Gandini		
1953	(Italy) Renato Ponzini		
1954	(Italy) Gino Reggiani		
1955	(Italy) Gianni Ferlenghi		
1956	(Italy) Nello Olivetti		
1957	(Italy) Colombo Cassano		
1958	(Italy) Ercole Baldini		
1959	(Italy) Guido Carlesi		
1960	(Italy) Remo Amici		
1961	(Italy) Guido Neri		
1962	(Italy) Lorenzo Lorenzi		
1963	(Italy) Alberto Pellizzaro		
1964	(Italy) Emilio Casalini		
1965	(Italy) Pietro Guerra		
1966	(Italy) Luciano Greci		
1967	(Italy) Ernesto Jotti		
1968	(Italy) Paolo Zini		
1969	(Italy) Giovanni Varini		
1970	No race		
1971	(Italy) Bruno Reggenini		
1972	(Italy) Claudio Guarnieri		
1973	(Italy) Massimo Tremolada		
1974	(Italy) Paolo Simboli		
1975	(Italy) Wainer Reggiani		
1976	(Italy) Emanuele Bombini		
1977	(Italy) Daniele Antinori		
1978	(Italy) Fabrizio Rizzolini		
1979	(Italy) Paolo Maini		
1980	No race		
1981	(Italy) Fabio Benotti		
1982	(Italy) Daniele Simboli		
1983	No race		
1984	(Italy) Roberto Pelliconi		
1985	(Italy) Maurizio Vandelli		
1986	(Italy) Marco Lietti		
1987	(Italy) Gianluca Tonetti		
1988	(Italy) Gianluca Tonetti		
1989	(Italy) Stefano Zanini		
1990	(Italy) Enrico Cecchetto		
1991	(Italy) Alessandro Bertolini		
1992	(Italy) Elio Aggiano		
1993	(Italy) Daniele Sgnaolin		
1994	(Italy) Sergio Previtali		
1995	(Italy) Michele Bedin		
1996	(Italy) Diego Ferrari		
1997	(Moldova) Ruslan Ivanov		
1998	(Italy) Michele Gobbi		
1999	(Italy) Luigi Giambelli		
2000	(Russia) Dmitrij Dement'ev		
2001	(Ukraine) Volodymyr Starchyk		
2002	(Ukraine) Roman Luhovyy	(Italy) Andrea Moletta	(Italy) Davide Silvestri
2003	(Italy) Davide Silvestri	(Italy) Riccardo Riccò	(Italy) Andrea Sanvido
2004	(Italy) Marco Vettoretti	(Italy) Paolo Bailetti	(Italy) Domenico Pozzovivo
2005	(Italy) Alessandro Raisoni	(Italy) Carlo Scognamiglio	(Italy) Maurizio Biondo
2006	(Italy) Federico Masiero	(Italy) Mauro Colombera	(Russia) Sergej Rudaskov
2007	(Italy) Davide Bonuccelli	(Italy) Damiano Margutti	(Italy) Emanuele Moschen
2008	(Italy) Leonardo Pinizzotto	(Italy) Sacha Modolo	(Italy) Daniel Oss
2009	(Italy) Andrea Vaccher	(Italy) Matteo Collodel	(Italy) Giorgio Cecchinel
2010	(Italy) Mario Sgrinzato	(Italy) Andrea Pasqualon	(Brazil) Rafael Andriato
2011	(Italy) Enrico Battaglin	(Italy) Andrea Palini	(Italy) Francesco Lasca
2012	(Italy) Mario Sgrinzato	(Ukraine) Oleksandr Polivoda	(Italy) Ricardo Pichetta
2013	(Italy) Mario Sgrinzato	(Italy) Paolo Colonna	(Romania) Andrei Nechita
2014	(Italy) Damiano Cima	(Italy) Stefano Perego	(Italy) Simone Bettinelli
2015	(Italy) Nicola Toffali	(Italy) Fausto Masnada	(Italy) Marco Bernardinetti
2016	(Belarus) Aleksandr Riabushenko	(Italy) Davide Orrico	(Italy) Andrea Vendrame
2017	(Italy) Federico Sartor	(Italy) Francesco Romano	(Italy) Davide Gabburo
2018	(Italy) Simone Ravanelli	(Italy) Luca Mozzato	(Italy) Ottavio Dotti
2019	(Italy) Edoardo Faresin	(Italy) Alexander Konychev	(Italy) Yuri Colonna
2020	Cancelled due to COVID-19 pandemic		
2021	(Italy) Andrea Piccolo	(Italy) Luca Rastelli	(Italy) Alessio Martinelli
2022	(Italy) Andrea Guerra	(Italy) Alessandro Romele	(Italy) Lorenzo Quartucci
2023	(Russia) Egor Igoshev	(Italy) Michael Belleri	(Italy) Nicolò Garibbo
2024	(Italy) Alessandro Borgo	(Italy) Edoardo Zamperini	(Italy) Filippo Agostinacchio
2025	(Denmark) Dennis Lock	(Denmark) Jaspar Christian Nowak Lonsdale	(Italy) Kevin Pezzo Rosola
2026	(Italy) Leonardo Meccia	(Italy) Lorenzo Magli	(Italy) Marco Martini

== Wins by country ==
Position	Country	Wins
1	Italy	83
2	Russia	2
3	Moldova	1
4	Belarus	1
5	Ukraine	1
5	Denmark	1

== Multiple wins ==
Position	Country	Wins
1	(Italy) Mario Sgrinzato	3
2	(Italy) Gianluca Tonetti	2
