= Gianluca Tonetti =

Italian road cyclist (1967–2023)

Personal information
- Born: 21 April 1967 Erba, Lombardy, Italy
- Died: 6 May 2023 (aged 56)

Cycling career
- Sport: Cycling
- Current team: Retired
- Discipline: Road
- Role: Rider

Amateur teams
- 1986: Zoccorinese–Centro Moda Pelle
- 1987–1988: Mecair–Aria Compressa
- 1994: Sassi Coalca–Katoxyn
- 1995: Canavesi–Equipe '93
- 1996–1998: Brunero Bongioanni Boeris Mapei

Professional teams
- 1989: Gewiss–Bianchi
- 1990: Malvor–Sidi
- 1991: ZG Mobili–Bottecchia
- 1992: Jolly Componibili–Club 88
- 1993: Eldor–Viner
- 1999–2001: Selle Italia
- 2002: Cage Maglierie–Olmo
- 2003–2005: Tenax–Nobili Rubinetterie

Gianluca Tonetti (21 April 1967 – 6 May 2023) was an Italian road cyclist. He most notably won the Trittico Lombardo in 2001. He also rode in four editions of the Giro d'Italia as well as the 1993 Vuelta a España.

Tonetti died on 6 May 2023, at the age of 56.

== Major results ==
1984
1st Giro della Lunigiana
1987
1st Coppa Collecchio
1988
1st Coppa Collecchio
1990
1st Trofeo dello Scalatore
1991
6th Coppa Placci
1992
6th GP Città di Camaiore
1993
3rd Kaistenberg Rundfahrt
7th Gran Piemonte
1998
2nd Piccolo Giro di Lombardia
2nd GP Capodarco
3rd Wartenberg Rundfahrt
1999
3rd GP Industria Artigianato e Commercio Carnaghese
3rd Giro d'Oro
10th Trofeo Melinda
2000
2nd Trofeo dello Scalatore
3rd Giro del Veneto
6th Coppa Agostoni
8th Coppa Placci
10th GP Industria & Commercio di Prato
2001
1st Trittico Lombardo
2nd Trofeo dello Scalatore
3rd Coppa Agostoni
4th GP Industria & Commercio di Prato
5th Overall Brixia Tour
8th Giro dell'Emilia
9th Overall Tour de Langkawi
2003
4th GP Città di Camaiore
4th Giro d'Oro
10th Overall Brixia Tour
2004
10th GP Nobili Rubinetterie
2005
6th GP Nobili Rubinetterie
10th GP Industria Artigianato e Commercio Carnaghese
