= Michele Merlo (cyclist) =

Italian cyclist

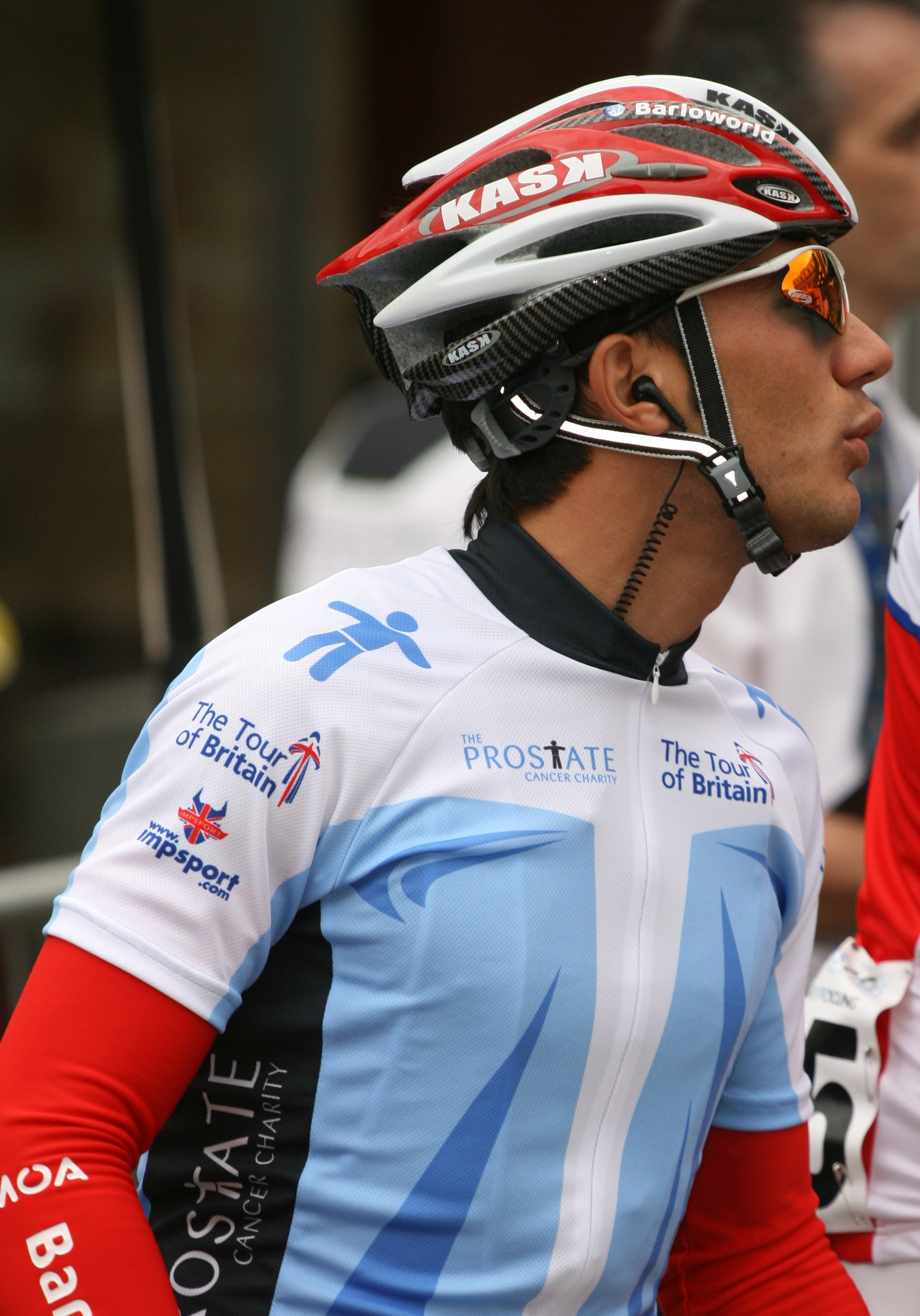
- Merlo at the start of Stage 2 of the 2009 Tour of Britain

Personal information
- Born: 7 August 1984 (age 42) Casaleone, Italy

Cycling career
- Sport: Cycling
- Discipline: Road
- Role: Rider

Professional teams
- 2009: Barloworld
- 2010: Footon–Servetto–Fuji
- 2011: De Rosa–Ceramica Flaminia
- 2012: Team WIT
- 2013: Vini Fantini–Selle Italia

Michele Merlo (born 7 August 1984) is an Italian professional racing cyclist, who last rode for the UCI Professional Continental team Vini Fantini–Selle Italia.

Merlo's first major professional victory was on the final stage of the 2009 Tour of Britain in London. He rode for Saunier Duval–Prodir for the 2010 season after Barloworld quit the sport.

== Palmarès ==
2008
1st Coppa San Geo
2009
1st Stage 8 Tour of Britain
2013
1st Stage 2 Vuelta al Táchira
1st Stage 1 Tour de Kumano
