= Kai Reus =

Dutch cyclist

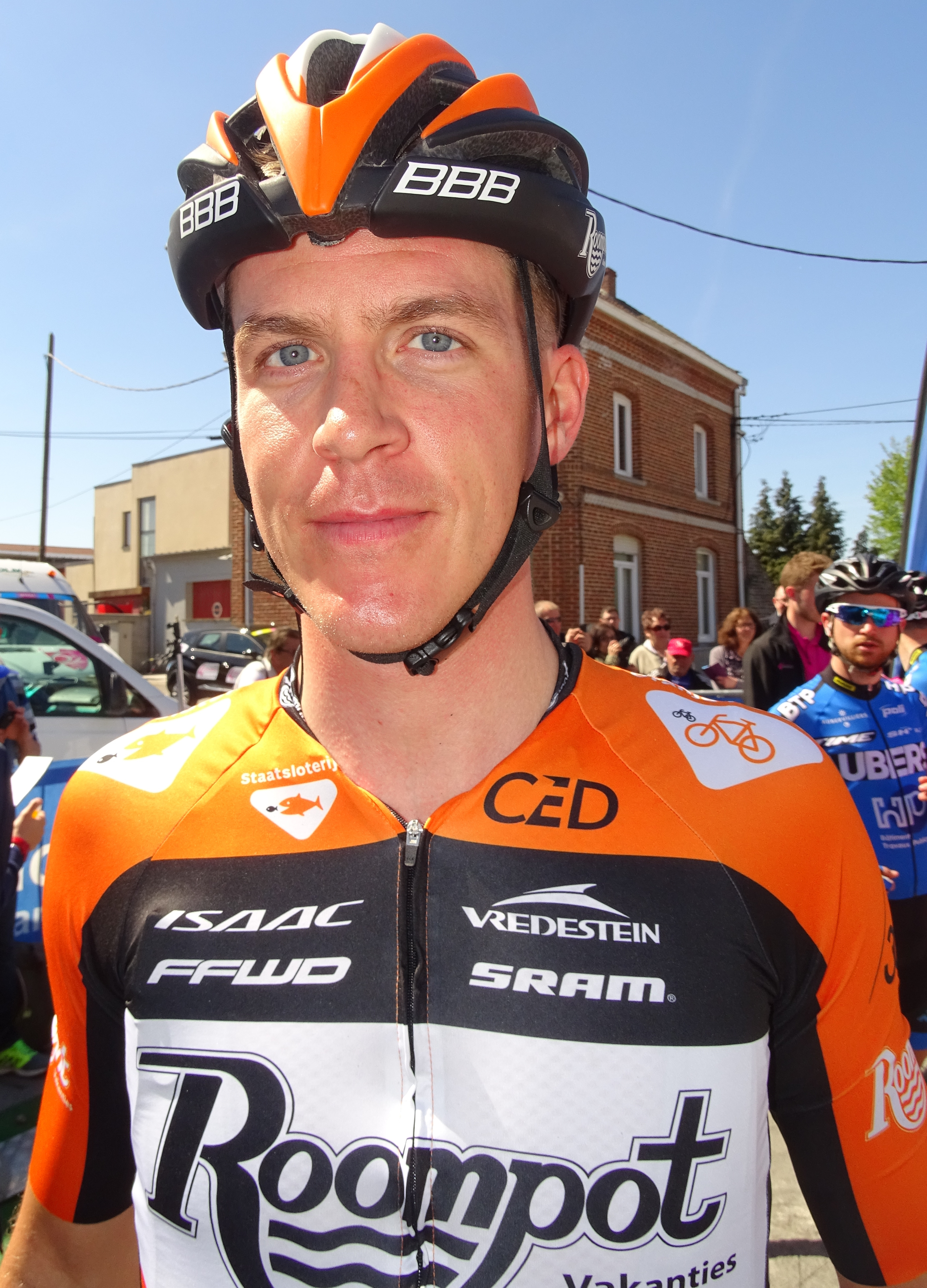
- Reus in 2016

Personal information
- Full name: Kai Reus
- Born: 11 March 1985 (age 41) Niedorp, the Netherlands
- Height: 1.85 m (6 ft 1 in)
- Weight: 70 kg (154 lb)

Cycling career
- Sport: Cycling
- Discipline: Road
- Role: Rider
- Rider type: Breakaway specialist

Amateur teams
- 2019: WV West Frisia
- 2020: A de Jong Groep

Professional teams
- 2004–2005: Rabobank GS3
- 2006–2010: Rabobank
- 2011: Cycling Team De Rijke
- 2012: UnitedHealthcare
- 2013: Cycling Team De Rijke–Shanks
- 2014: Cyclingteam de Rijke
- 2015–2016: Verandas Willems
- 2016: Roompot–Oranje Peloton
Medal record
Representing Netherlands
Men's road bicycle racing
World Championships
Gold medal – first place	2003 Hamilton	Junior road race

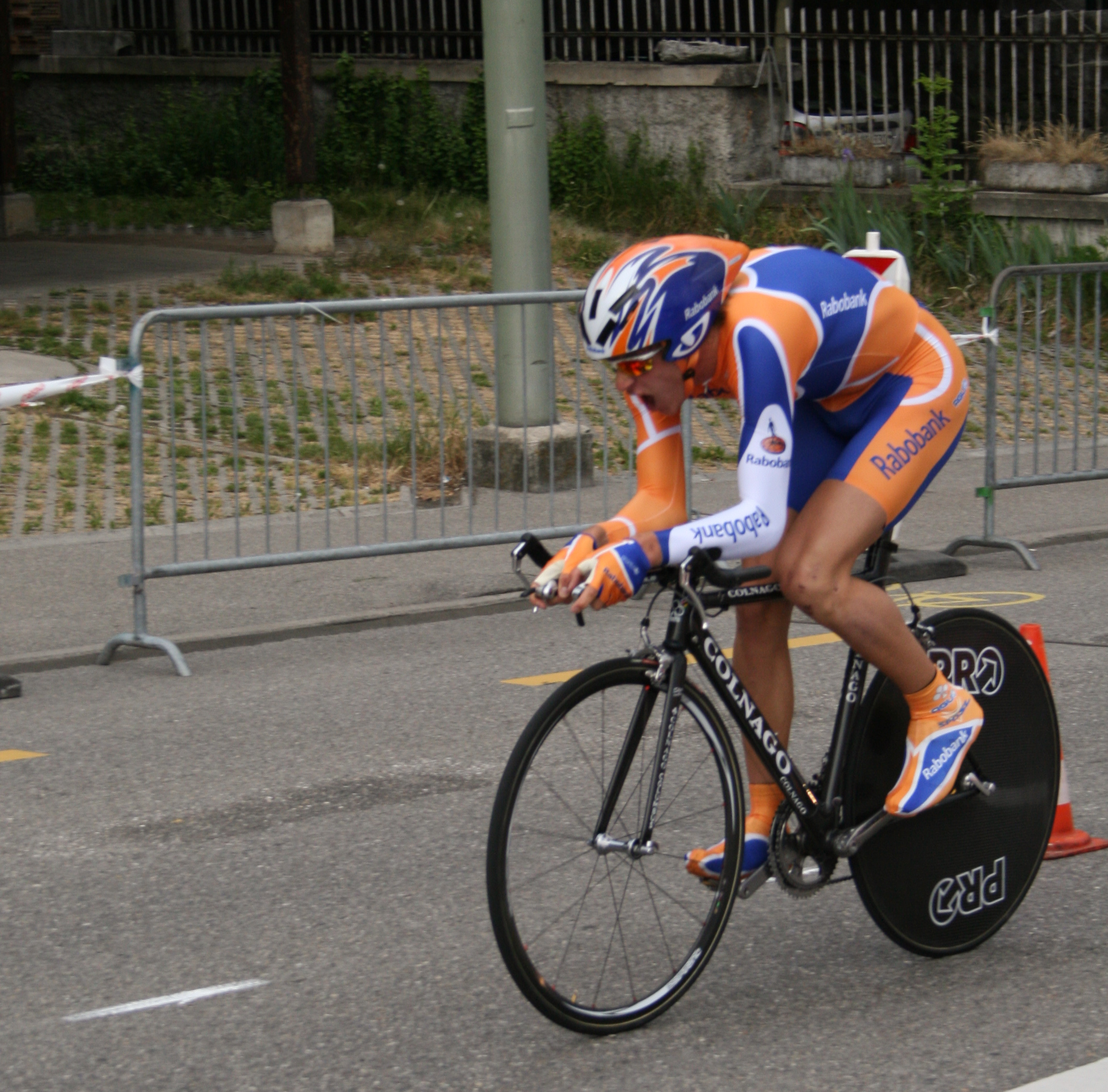
Reus during the 2007 Tour de Romandie

Kai Reus (born 11 March 1985) is a Dutch former professional road bicycle racer who last rode for Roompot–Oranje Peloton.

As a junior, Reus won the Junior men's road race during the 2003 UCI Road World Championships.

After missing out on the 2007 Tour de France Reus was training at the Col de l'Iseran on 12 July 2007. Reus fell from his bike and slipped into a coma. After teammate Michael Rasmussen won the yellow jersey during the Tour he dedicated the jersey to Reus. Eventually Reus would remain in coma until 23 July. Reus returned to racing in the 2008 Tour of Missouri.

Reus took a year off from cycling between 2010 and 2011 after he was diagnosed with mononucleosis and lost form. He competed for Cycling Team De Rijke in 2011 and 2013, with a season at UnitedHealthcare in between.

At the end of the 2016 season, Reus announced his retirement.

== Major results ==
2003
1st Road race, UCI Junior Road World Championships
1st Overall UCI Junior World Cup
1st Time trial, National Junior Road Championships
1st Overall Tour de l'Abitibi
1st Overall Tour du Pays de Vaud

1st Prologue

1st Overall Driedaagse van Axel

1st Mountains classification
1st Stage 4

1st Overall Junior Tour of Ireland

1st Stages 2 & 3

1st Overall Euregio Autolease Heuvelland Tour

1st Stage 2

3rd Omloop Mandel-Leie-Schelde Juniors
4th Overall Tour de Lorraine Juniors

1st Stage 4 (ITT)

2004
1st Overall Triptyque des Barrages
4th Overall Olympia's Tour
4th Chrono des Nations U23
4th Overall Tweedaagse der Gaverstreek
4th Time trial, National Under-23 Road Championships
6th Overall GP Tell

1st Stage 1

8th Ronde van Noord-Holland
2005
1st Overall Tour de Normandie

1st Stage 4

1st Overall Thüringen-Rundfahrt

1st Stage 2

1st Grand Prix Pino Cerami
1st Stages 3 & 5b (ITT) Circuito Montañés
3rd Ronde van Noord-Holland
5th Time trial, National Under-23 Road Championships
6th Overall Course de Solidarność et des Champions Olympiques
2006
National Under-23 Road Championships

1st Road race
1st Time trial

1st Overall Tour de Normandie

1st Prologue & Stage 5

1st Ronde van Noord-Holland
1st Liège–Bastogne–Liège U23
3rd Rund um Köln
6th Overall Volta ao Distrito de Santarém
7th Overall GP CTT Correios de Portugal
2009
4th Overall Tour of Britain

1st Stage 2

2011
1st Stage 1 Mi-Août en Bretagne
2012
1st Stage 7 Volta a Portugal
2015
6th Overall Ronde van Midden-Nederland

1st Stage 1 (TTT)

8th Duo Normand
