= Francesco Bellotti =

Italian cyclist

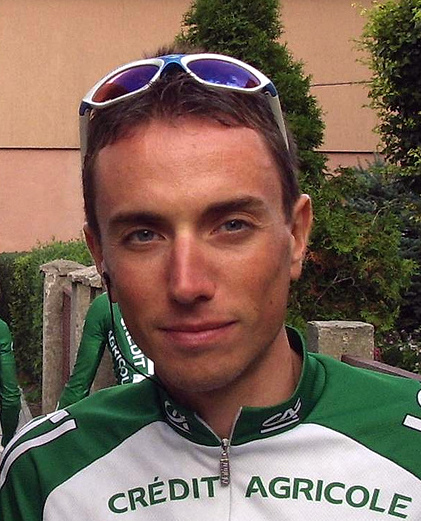

Personal information
- Full name: Francesco Bellotti
- Born: 6 August 1979 (age 47) Bussolengo, Italy
- Height: 1.79 m (5 ft 10 in)
- Weight: 65 kg (143 lb)

Cycling career
- Sport: Cycling
- Discipline: Road
- Role: Rider

Amateur teams
- 2000: Amica Chips–Tacconi Sport (stagiaire)
- 2002: Tacconi Sport (stagiaire)

Professional teams
- 2003: Mercatone Uno–Scanavino
- 2004: Barloworld
- 2005–2007: Crédit Agricole
- 2008–2009: Barloworld
- 2010–2011: Liquigas–Doimo

Francesco Bellotti (born 6 August 1979) is an Italian former professional road bicycle racer, who last rode for UCI ProTour team Liquigas–Cannondale.

== Major results ==
2001
8th GP Palio del Recioto
2003
6th GP Lugano
8th Giro della Provincia di reggio Calabria
2004
2nd Gran Premio Industria e Commercio di Prato
2005
7th Overall Tour de l'Ain
7th Tour du Finistère
2006
2nd Overall Tour de Langkawi
2008
5th Overall Giro del Trentino
10th Overall Volta ao Alentejo
2010
2nd GP Nobili Rubinetterie
7th Gran Premio Industria e Commercio Artigianato Carnaghese

=== Grand Tour general classification results timeline ===
Grand Tour	2005	2006	2007	2008	2009	2010	2011
Giro d'Italia	36	41	DNF	DNF	58	—	—
Tour de France	—	—	—	—	—	122	—
/ Vuelta a España	DNF	—	—	—	—	—	109

Legend
—	Did not compete
DNF	Did not finish
