= Tiaan Kannemeyer =

South African cyclist (born 1978)

Personal information
- Born: 14 December 1978 (age 47) Bellville, South Africa

Cycling career
- Sport: Cycling
- Current team: Retired
- Discipline: Road
- Role: Rider

Amateur team
- 2002: Biomax–Minolta

Professional teams
- 2000–2001: Team Cologne
- 2003–2006: Barloworld
- 2007: Team Konica Minolta
- 2009: Team Neotel
- 2010: House of Paint

Tiaan Kannemeyer (born 14 December 1978) is a South African former professional road cyclist. In 2002 he won the South African National Road Race Championships.

== Major results ==
1999
1st Road race, All-Africa Games
2002
1st Road race, National Road Championships
1st Stage 8 Herald Sun Tour
2003
1st Overall Tour d'Egypte

1st Stage 3

1st Stage 3 Tour of Queensland
9th Overall Tour de la Manche
2004
2nd Overall Giro del Capo

1st Stage 1

2nd Time trial, National Road Championships
2nd Gran Premio Industria e Commercio Artigianato Carnaghese
4th Overall Tour de Langkawi
9th Giro del Friuli
9th GP Industria & Artigianato di Larciano
10th Overall Settimana Ciclista Lombarda
2005
1st Overall UCI Africa Tour
National Road Championships

1st Time trial
2nd Road race

1st Overall Giro del Capo

1st Points classification
1st Stages 2 & 4

3rd Overall Tour de Langkawi
6th Overall Giro del Trentino
2006
5th Overall Giro del Capo
2007
2nd Powerade Dome 2 Dome Cycling Spectacular
