= Laurent Mangel =

French cyclist

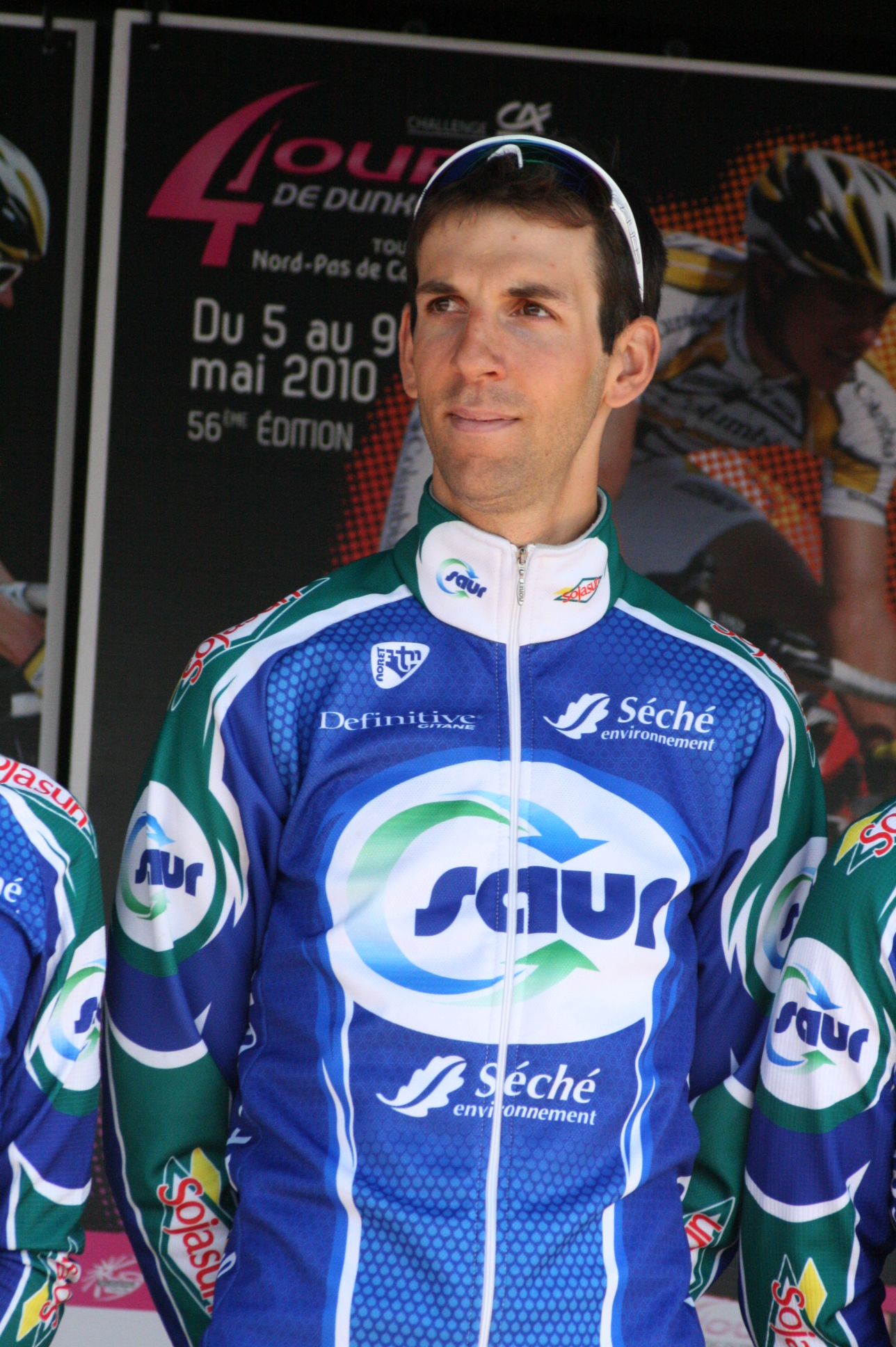
- Mangel at the 2010 Four Days of Dunkirk

Personal information
- Full name: Laurent Mangel
- Born: 22 May 1981 (age 45) Vesoul, France
- Height: 1.95 m (6 ft 5 in)
- Weight: 83 kg (183 lb)

Cycling career
- Sport: Cycling
- Current team: Retired
- Discipline: Road
- Role: Rider
- Rider type: Rouleur

Professional teams
- 2005–2008: AG2R Prévoyance
- 2009–2012: Besson Chaussures–Sojasun
- 2013–2014: FDJ

Laurent Mangel (born 22 May 1981) is a French former professional racing cyclist, who rode professionally between 2005 and 2014 for the Ag2r–La Mondiale, Saur–Sojasun and FDJ.fr teams.

== Major results ==
2004
1st Overall Tour Nord Isère

1st Points classification
1st Stage 2

1st Overall Ruban Granitier Breton

1st Stages 1 & 5

2nd Paris–Troyes
2005
1st Stage 2 Boucles de la Mayenne
2006
1st Stage 6 Tour de Langkawi
6th Overall Circuit Franco-Belge
9th Le Samyn
2009
1st Stage 3 Tour de Bretagne
1st Stage 2 Tour du Gévaudan Languedoc-Roussillon
2010
1st Classic Loire Atlantique
1st Stage 1 Boucles de la Mayenne
3rd Overall Tour de Wallonie

1st Stage 4

3rd Paris–Camembert
5th Tour du Doubs
2011
4th Boucles du Sud Ardèche
6th Overall Circuit de Lorraine
7th Eschborn-Frankfurt City Loop
8th Classic Loire Atlantique
2012
2nd Cholet-Pays de Loire
3rd Grand Prix de la Ville de Lillers
2013
4th Grand Prix de la Somme
