= Reinier Honig =

Dutch cyclist

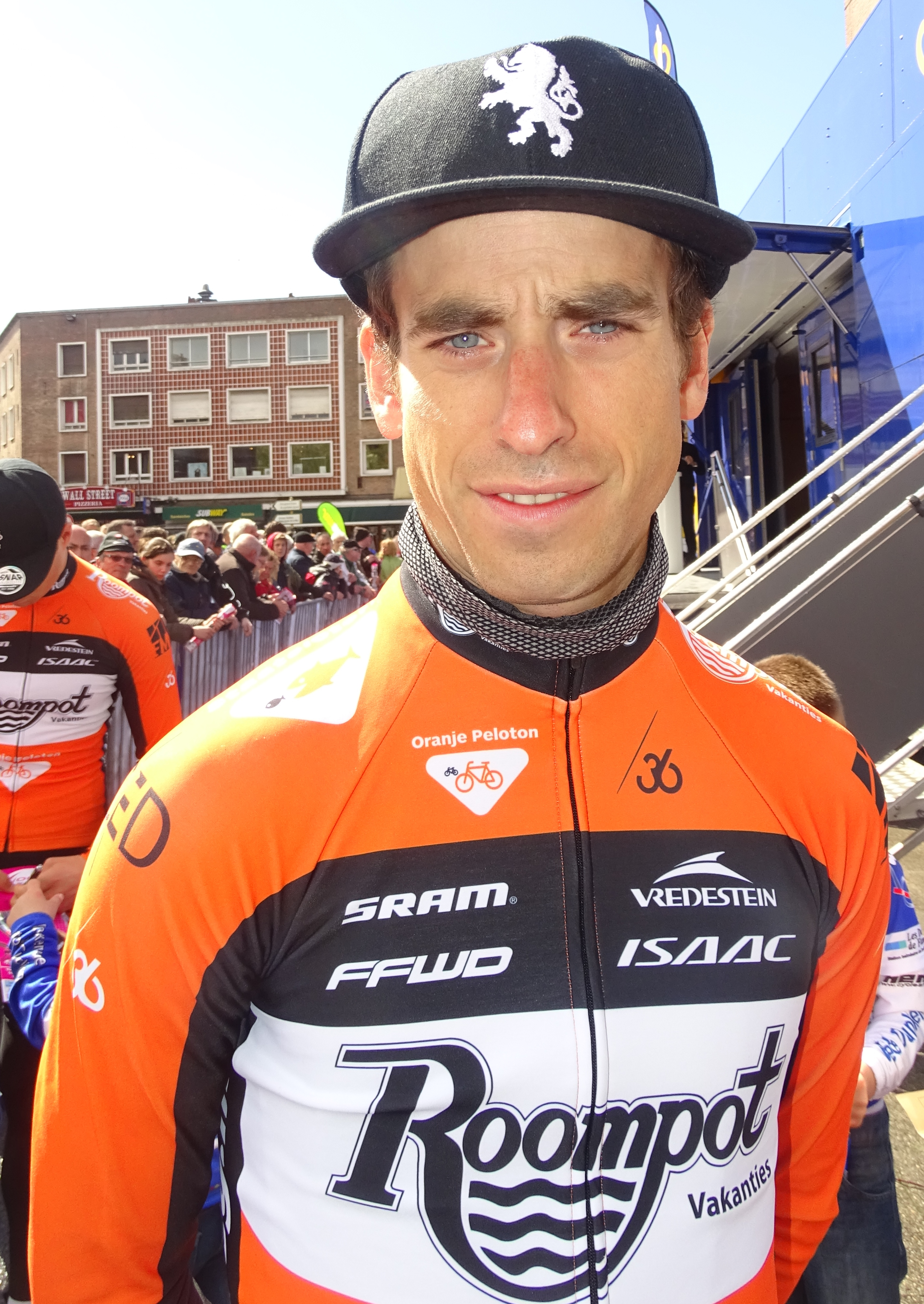
- Honig in 2015

Personal information
- Full name: Reinier Honig
- Born: 28 October 1983 (age 42) Heemskerk, Netherlands
- Height: 1.77 m (5 ft 10 in)
- Weight: 63 kg (139 lb)

Cycling career
- Sport: Cycling
- Current team: China Anta–Mentech Cycling Team
- Discipline: Road
- Role: Rider

Amateur teams
- 2002–2005: Bert Story–Piels
- 2006–2008: P3Transfer–Doorisol
- 2018: WC Eemland–SmartDry
- 2019: Team ProCyclingStats
- 2020: Team SmartDry

Professional teams
- 2009: Vacansoleil
- 2010: Acqua & Sapone
- 2011–2013: Landbouwkrediet
- 2014: Team Vorarlberg
- 2015–2016: Team Roompot
- 2017: Team Vorarlberg
- 2021: Start Cycling Team
- 2022–: China Glory Continental Cycling Team

Reinier Honig (born 28 October 1983) is a Dutch professional racing cyclist, who currently rides for UCI Continental team China Anta–Mentech Cycling Team.

== Major results ==
2000
1st Road race, National Junior Road Championships
2001
1st Road race, National Junior Road Championships
2003
1st Stage 3 Tour de Gironde
2005
2nd Road race, National Under-23 Road Championships
2006
8th Grand Prix Pino Cerami
8th Ronde van Overijssel
2007
1st Dorpenomloop Rucphen
2nd Overall Vuelta a Extremadura
2nd Ronde van Midden-Nederland
2008
1st Circuito de Getxo
4th Druivenkoers Overijse
7th Kampioenschap van Vlaanderen
9th Rund um die Nürnberger Altstadt
9th Antwerpse Havenpijl
2009
5th Gran Piemonte
6th GP du Canton d'Argovie
9th Overall Tour of Britain
2011
3rd Road race, National Road Championships
10th Tour de Vendée
2012
5th Beverbeek Classic
9th Druivenkoers Overijse
2013
3rd World Ports Classic
2014
3rd Race Horizon Park 1
7th Race Horizon Park 3
2019
4th Overall Vuelta Ciclista a Costa Rica

1st Stage 2
