= Andoni Aranaga =

Spanish professional road bicycle racer

Personal information
- Full name: Andoni Aranaga Azkune
- Born: 1 January 1979 (age 47) Azpeitia, Spain
- Height: 1.74 m (5 ft 9 in)
- Weight: 60 kg (130 lb)

Cycling career
- Sport: Cycling
- Current team: Retired
- Discipline: Road
- Role: Rider

Professional teams
- 2004: Chocolade Jacques–Wincor Nixdorf
- 2005: Kaiku
- 2006–2007: Euskaltel–Euskadi

Andoni Aranaga Azkune (born 1 January 1979) is a Spanish former professional road bicycle racer, who rode professionally between 2004 and 2007 for the Chocolade Jacques–Wincor Nixdorf, Kaiku and Euskaltel–Euskadi teams. Aranaga won stages in the Vuelta a Asturias and the Volta a la Comunitat Valenciana in 2005.

== Major results ==
1997
2nd Road race, National Junior Road Championships
2005
1st Stage 2 Vuelta a Asturias
1st Stage 3 Volta a la Comunitat Valenciana
2006
9th Circuito de Getxo
