= Éric Leblacher =

French cyclist

Personal information
- Born: 21 March 1978 (age 48) Meaux, France

Cycling career
- Sport: Cycling
- Current team: Retired
- Discipline: Road
- Role: Rider

Amateur teams
- 2001: Crédit Agricole (stagiaire)
- 2002: Crédit Agricole Espoirs

Professional teams
- 2002–2005: Crédit Agricole
- 2006: Française des Jeux

Éric Leblacher (born 21 March 1978 in Meaux) is a French former cyclist.

== Major results ==
2002
1st Stage 4 Circuit des Ardennes
2003
8th Tour du Doubs
10th Boucles de l'Aulne
2004
4th Overall Tour of Britain
6th Polynormande
8th Tour du Doubs
2006
1st Stage 3 Étoile de Bessèges
4th Paris–Camembert
5th Tour du Doubs

=== Grand Tour general classification results timeline ===
Grand Tour	2005	2006
Giro d'Italia	—	—
Tour de France	—	—
Vuelta a España	DNF	33

Legend
—	Did not compete
DNF	Did not finish
