= Davide Silvestri =

Italian cyclist

Personal information
- Full name: Davide Daniele Silvestri
- Born: 14 March 1980 (age 46) Sarzana, Italy

Cycling career
- Sport: Cycling
- Current team: Retired
- Discipline: Road
- Role: Rider

Amateur team
- 2004: Ceramica Panaria–Margres (stagiaire)

Professional teams
- 2005: Team Nippo
- 2006: Team Endeka

Davide Daniele Silvestri (born 14 March 1980 in Sarzana) is a former Italian cyclist.

== Major results ==
2003
1st Stage 2 Giro del Veneto
1st Stage 4 Girobio
1st Coppa Collecchio
2005
1st Overall Tour du Cameroun

1st Stage 1
