= Ryan Cox =

South African cyclist (1979–2007)

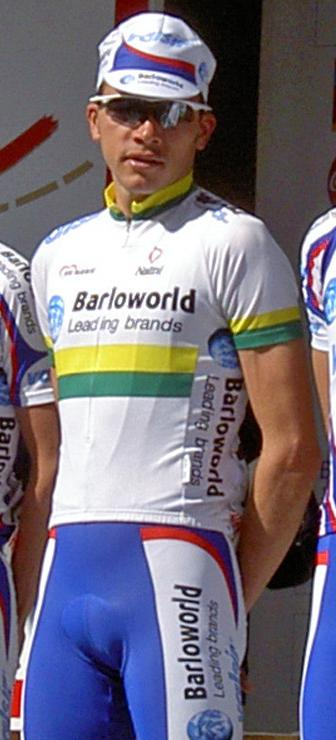
- Ryan Cox in 2005

Personal information
- Full name: Ryan Rodney Cox
- Born: 9 April 1979 South Africa
- Died: 1 August 2007 (aged 28)
- Height: 1.77 m (5 ft 10 in)
- Weight: 62 kg (137 lb)

Cycling career
- Sport: Cycling
- Discipline: Road
- Role: Rider
- Rider type: Climbing specialist

Professional teams
- 2000: Amore & Vita–Giubileo 2000–Beretta
- 2001–2002: Team Cologne
- 2003–2007: Barloworld

Major wins
- Stage races Tour of Qinghai Lake (2004) Tour de Langkawi (2005) One-day races and Classics National Road Race Championships (2004, 2005)

Ryan Rodney Cox (9 April 1979 – 1 August 2007) was a South African professional road racing cyclist. He had been cycling since 1987 and turned professional in 2000. He first joined Amore & Vita–Giubileo 2000–Beretta but changed the following year to Team Cologne which was based in Germany. He had been a member of Team Barloworld since 2003. In 2004 and 2005 he won the South African National Road Race Championships.

Cox died at a Kempton Park hospital when the main artery in his left leg burst, three weeks after a vascular lesion operation in France for a knotted artery.

== Major achievements ==
2000
4th Road race, National Road Championships
2001
2nd Time trial, National Road Championships
2002
National Road Championships

2nd Road race
3rd Time trial

2003
1st Stage 1 Circuit des Mines
5th Tour du Doubs
10th Overall Giro del Friuli Venezia Giulia
10th Tour du Jura
2004
National Road Championships

1st Road race
4th Time trial

1st Overall Tour of Qinghai Lake

1st Stage 1

2nd Overall Tour de Langkawi
9th Overall Giro del Capo

1st Stage 4 (ITT)

2005
National Road Championships

1st Road race
2nd Time trial

1st Overall Tour de Langkawi

1st Mountains classification
1st Stage 8

2nd Overall UCI Africa Tour
2nd Overall UCI Asia Tour
2nd Overall Giro del Capo

1st Mountains classification

6th Subida al Naranco
10th Overall Tour of Qinghai Lake

1st Stage 6

2006
3rd Overall Giro del Capo
2007
5th Overall Giro del Capo
