= Devis Miorin =

Italian cyclist

Personal information
- Born: 24 March 1976 (age 50) San Vito al Tagliamento

Cycling career
- Sport: Cycling
- Current team: Retired
- Discipline: Road
- Role: Rider

Professional teams
- 2000–2001: Mobilvetta Design–Rossin
- 2002–2004: De Nardi–Pasta Montegrappa
- 2005: Liquigas–Bianchi
- 2006: Team Endeka
- 2007: Kio Ene–Tonazzi–DMT
- 2008: Nippo–Endeka

Devis Miorin (born 24 March 1976 in San Vito al Tagliamento) is an Italian former cyclist.

== Major results ==
1997
1st Overall Giro della Valle d'Aosta
1998
1st Trofeo Alcide Degasperi
1999
1st Giro del Medio Brenta
2002
3rd Overall Uniqa Classic

1st Stage 1
