= Ángel Vallejo =

Spanish bicycle racer

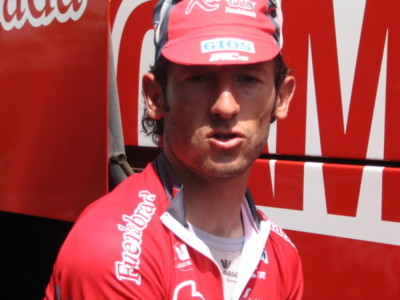
- Vallejo as a Relax–Fuenlabrada rider

Personal information
- Full name: Ángel Vallejo Domínguez
- Born: 1 April 1981 (age 45) Mijares, Spain

Cycling career
- Sport: Cycling
- Current team: Retired
- Discipline: Road
- Role: Rider

Professional teams
- 2005–2007: Relax–Fuenlabrada
- 2008: Centro Ciclismo de Loulé
- 2009: Andorra–Grandvalira

Ángel Vallejo Domínguez (born 1 April 1981 in Mijares) is a Spanish former cyclist, who competed in the Vuelta a España in 2006 and 2007.

== Major results ==
2006
1st Stage 10 Tour de Langkawi
