= Sven Renders =

Belgian cyclist

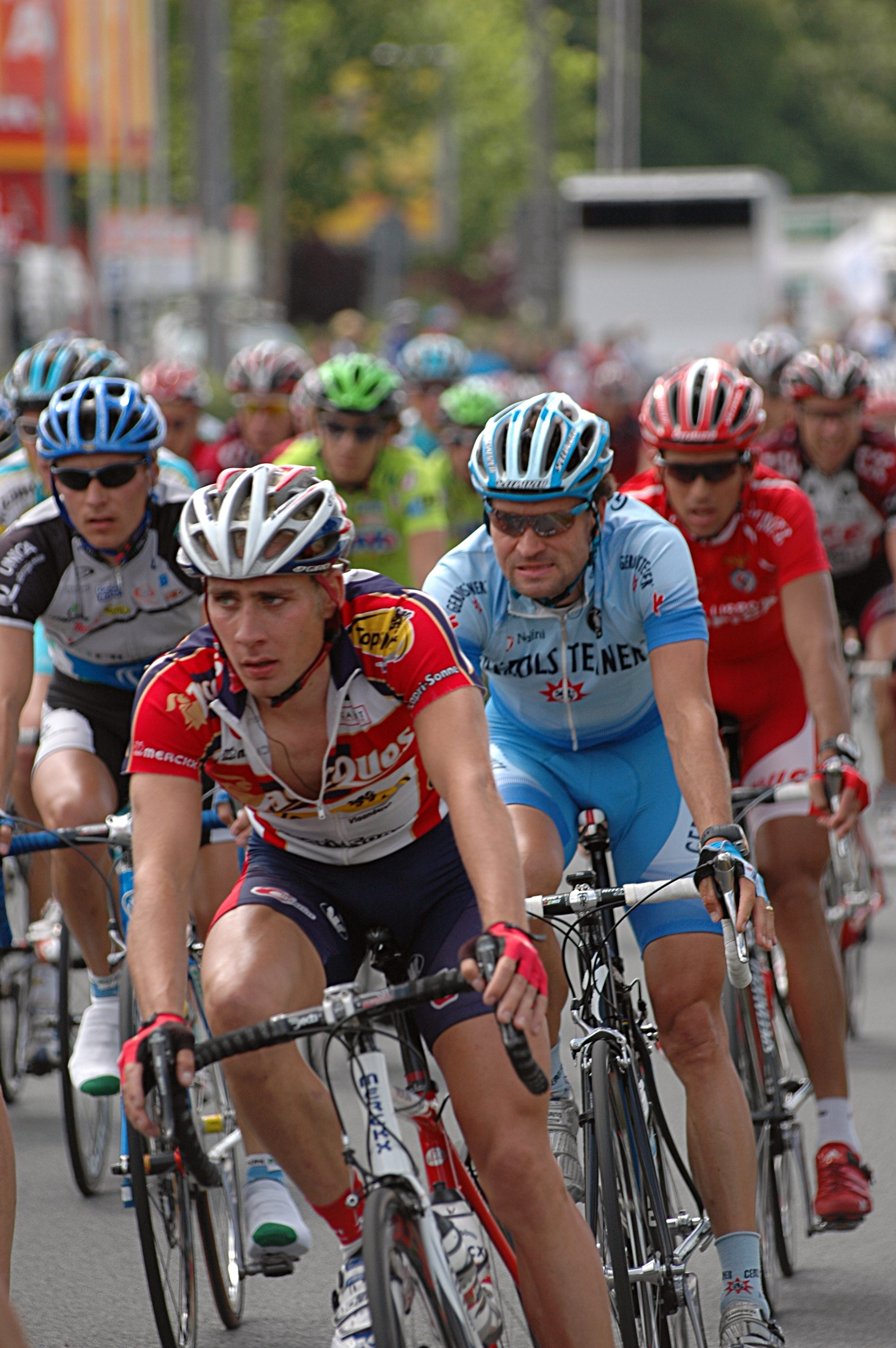

Personal information
- Full name: Sven Renders
- Born: 12 August 1981 (age 45) Wilrijk, Belgium

Cycling career
- Sport: Cycling
- Current team: Willems Verandas
- Discipline: Road
- Role: Rider

Professional teams
- 2005–2006: Landbouwkrediet–Colnago
- 2007–2009: Chocolade Jacques–Topsport Vlaanderen
- 2010–: Willems Verandas

Sven Renders (born 12 August 1981 in Wilrijk) is a Belgian professional road bicycle racer who rides for Willems Verandas.
