= Guillermo Bongiorno =

Argentine cyclist

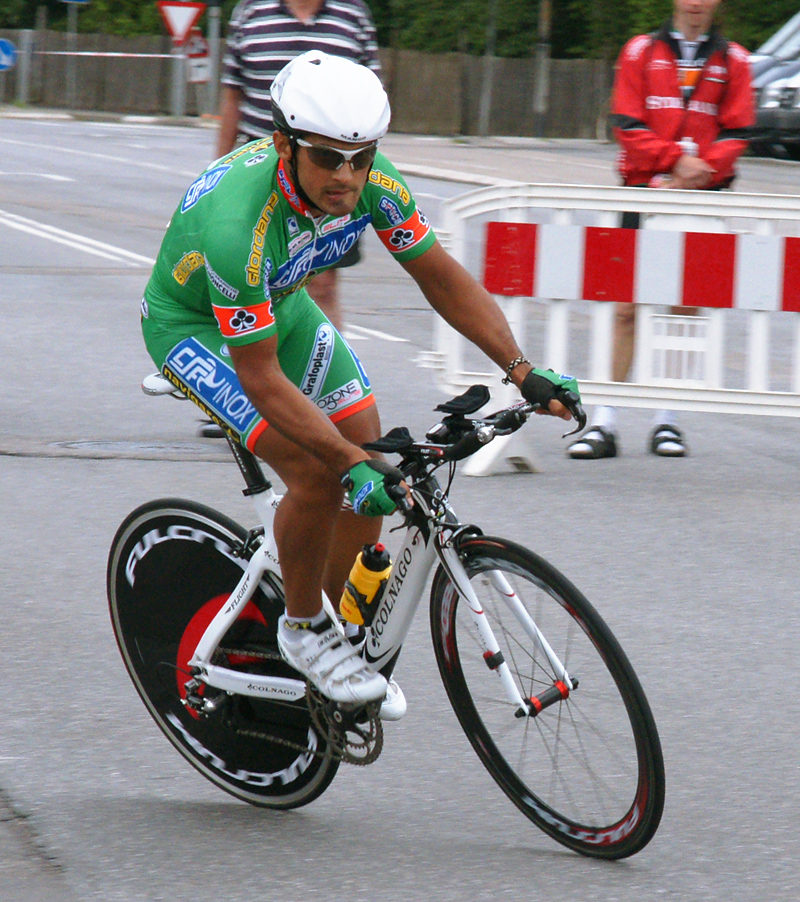
- Bongiorno at the 2009 Danmark Rundt

Personal information
- Full name: Guillermo Rubén Bongiorno
- Born: 29 July 1978 (age 48) Mar del Plata, Argentina

Cycling career
- Sport: Cycling
- Current team: Retired
- Discipline: Road
- Role: Rider
- Rider type: Sprinter

Amateur teams
- 2001–2002: Parolin–Uniconfort
- 2013–2014: Sprint Haupt
- 2014–2016: Buenos Aires Ciudad
- 2017: Expo Ladrillos–Luján

Professional teams
- 2003–2009: Ceramiche Panaria–Fiordo
- 2010: Zheroquadro–Radenska
- 2011: Amore & Vita

Guillermo Rubén Bongiorno (born 29 July 1978 in Mar del Plata) is an Argentine former professional cyclist.

== Major results ==
2003
1st Stage 10 Tour de Langkawi
2004
1st Stage 10 Tour de Langkawi
2005
1st Gran Premio Città di Misano – Adriatico
1st Giro della Provincia di Reggio Calabria
Tour de Langkawi

1st Stages 2 & 6

1st Stage 1a Settimana Internazionale di Coppi e Bartali
1st Stage 1 Settimana Ciclistica Lombarda
1st Stage 2a Brixia Tour
1st Stage 1 Regio-Tour
2006
1st Stage 2 Tour de Langkawi
2008
1st Stage 1 Tour of Turkey
Danmark Rundt

1st Stages 1 & 4
