= Carlo Scognamiglio (cyclist) =

Italian cyclist

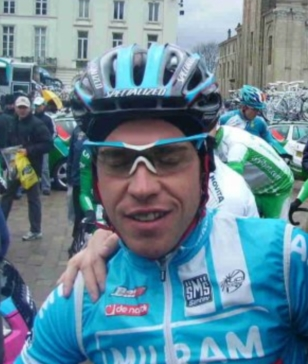

Personal information
- Full name: Carlo Scognamiglio
- Born: 31 May 1983 (age 43) Seriate, Italy

Cycling career
- Sport: Cycling
- Discipline: Road
- Role: Rider

Amateur team
- 2004–2005: De Nardi–Piemme Telekom (stagiaire)

Professional teams
- 2006–2007: Team Milram
- 2008–2009: Barloworld
- 2010: ISD–NERI
- 2011: Team Vorarlberg

Carlo Scognamiglio (born 31 May 1983, in Seriate) is an Italian professional road bicycle racer who rode for UCI Professional Continental team Barloworld until the team's demise. Scognamiglio turned professional with Team Milram for the 2006 season and stayed with the team for two years.

== Palmares ==
- 2nd, National U23 Road Race Championship (2004)
