= Barloworld (cycling team) =

Team information
- UCI code: BAR
- Registered: United Kingdom
- Founded: 2003
- Disbanded: 2009
- Discipline: Road
- Status: Professional Continental

Key personnel
- General manager: Claudio Corti

Barloworld (UCI team code: BAR) was a UCI Professional Continental cycling team that competed between 2003 and 2009. Its sponsor company was South African and the team maintained a South African identity, but it was first registered in Italy and then, from 2007, in Great Britain.

Barloworld rode UCI Continental Circuits races and, when selected, UCI ProTour events. They were managed by Claudio Corti, with Valerio Tebaldi, Christian Andersen and Alberto Volpi as directeurs sportifs. Its prominent riders included South African Robert Hunter and Colombian Mauricio Soler. Chris Froome rode for Barloworld for 2008 and 2009.

The sponsor was Barloworld, an industrial brand management company. The team rode Bianchi frames with Shimano components.

== Tour de France 2007 ==
Barloworld competed in the 2007 Tour de France after a wild card entry. It was the first British-registered team in the Tour since ANC-Halfords in 1987. The team won two stages through Mauricio Soler and Robert Hunter, won the King of the Mountains competition (Soler), and had eight of its nine riders finish the race. Shortly after the Tour, team rider Ryan Cox, not a member of the Tour squad, died when an artery burst in his leg following surgery.

== Tour de France 2008 ==
The team again received a wildcard entry for the 2008 Tour de France, but Soler was injured on Stage 1 and dropped out in stage 5. Three others left with injuries, and only four completed the race, with no top three placings on any stage. Moisés Dueñas had a positive test for EPO following stage four and was withdrawn before stage 11. Barloworld announced their withdrawal from sponsorship after the tour, but on 28 October decided to sponsor for another year.

The team was not invited to the 2009 Tour de France.

== Major wins ==
2003
Overall Tour d'Egypte, Tiaan Kannemeyer

Stages 1 & 2, Hilton Clarke
Stage 3, Tiaan Kannemeyer

Overall Giro del Capo, David George

Stage 5, David George

Stage 3 Circuit des Mines, Ryan Cox
South Africa Road Race Championships, David George
Stage 2 Herald Sun Tour, Hilton Clarke
Stage 2 Tour of Queensland, Sean Sullivan
Stage 3 Tour of Queensland, Tiaan Kannemeyer

2004
Stage 4 Tour de Langkawi, Sean Sullivan
South Africa Time Trial Championships, David George
South Africa Road Race Championships, Ryan Cox
Overall Giro del Capo, David George

Stage 1, Tiaan Kannemeyer
Stage 4, Ryan Cox

Criterium d'Abruzzo, Enrico Degano
Overall Tour of Qinghai Lake, Ryan Cox
Stage 3 Brixia Tour, Enrico Degano
Stage 5 Tour of Britain, Enrico Degano

2005
Overall Tour de Langkawi, Ryan Cox

Stage 8, Ryan Cox

South Africa Time Trial Championships, Tiaan Kannemeyer
South Africa Road Race Championships, Ryan Cox
Stage 4 Vuelta a Murcia, Pedro Arreitunandia
Overall Giro del Capo, Tiaan Kannemeyer

Stages 2 & 5, Tiaan Kannemeyer

Stage 2 Vuelta a Aragón, Vladimir Efimkin
Stage 4 Four Days of Dunkirk, Vladimir Efimkin
Overall Tour of Japan, Félix Cárdenas

Stages 3 & 5, Félix Cárdenas

Stage 3 Euskal Bizikleta, Pedro Arreitunandia
Stages 1 & 5 Ster Elektrotoer, Enrico Degano
Stage 6 Tour of Qinghai Lake, Ryan Cox
Stage 9 Tour of Qinghai Lake, Sean Sullivan
Overall Tour de Wallonie, Luca Celli

Stage 1, Luca Celli

Overall Volta a Portugal, Vladimir Efimkin

Stage 3, Vladimir Efimkin

Stage 2 Vuelta a Burgos, Igor Astarloa

2006
Sategs 2 & 4 GP Costa Azul, Enrico Degano
Milano–Torino, Igor Astarloa
Overall Course de la Paix, Giampaolo Cheula
Stage 2 Volta ao Alentejo, Enrico Degano
Stage 1 G.P. CTT Correios, Enrico Degano
Stage 2 Brixia Tour, Félix Cárdenas
Prueba Villafranca de Ordizia, Félix Cárdenas
Gran Premio Industria e Commercio Artigianato Carnaghese, Félix Cárdenas

2007
Overall Giro del Capo, Alexander Efimkin

Stage 1, Félix Cárdenas
Stage 3, Alexander Efimkin
Stage 5, Robert Hunter

Overall Volta ao Distrito de Santarém, Robert Hunter

Stage 2, Robert Hunter

Overall Settimana Lombarda, Alexander Efimkin

Stage 3, Alexander Efimkin

Stage 2 Clasica Alcobendas, Robert Hunter
Overall Tour de Picardie, Robert Hunter

Stage 1, Robert Hunter

Stage 1 G.P. CTT Correios, Enrico Degano
Mountains classification in the Tour de France, Mauricio Soler
Stage 9 Tour de France, Mauricio Soler
Stage 11 Tour de France, Robert Hunter
Overall Vuelta a Burgos, Mauricio Soler

Stage 2, Mauricio Soler

2008
World's View Challenge 3, Robert Hunter
World's View Challenge 4, Robert Hunter
Stage 2 Giro della Provincia di Reggio Calabria, Steve Cummings
Overall Giro del Capo, Christian Pfannberger

Stage 1, Christian Pfannberger

Stage 1 Driedaagse van De Panne, Enrico Gasparotto
Grand Prix Pino Cerami, Patrick Calcagni
Stage 2 Clasica Alcobendas, Baden Cooke
Stage 4 G.P. CTT Correios, Robert Hunter
Overall Ster Elektrotoer, Enrico Gasparotto

Stage 3, Enrico Gasparotto

Austria Road Race Championships, Christian Pfannberger
Gran Premio Nobili Rubinetterie, Giampaolo Cheula
Coppa Bernocchi, Steve Cummings
Giro della Romagna, Enrico Gasparotto
Stage 3 Herald Sun Tour, Baden Cooke
Stage 6 Herald Sun Tour, Daryl Impey

2009
Stage 4 Tour Méditerranéen, Robert Hunter
Giro del Capo I, Robert Hunter
Giro del Capo II, Chris Froome
Giro del Capo III, Steve Cummings
Overall Presidential Cycling Tour of Turkey, Daryl Impey

Stage 4, Daryl Impey

Stage 3 Giro del Trentino, Robert Hunter
Stage 8 Tour of Britain, Michele Merlo

== National champions ==
2003
South African Road Race Championships, David George
2004
South African Time Trial Championships, David George
South African Road Race Championships, Ryan Cox
2005
South African Time Trial Championships, Tiaan Kannemeyer
South African Road Race Championships, Ryan Cox
2008
Austrian Road Race Championships, Christian Pfannberger

== Team roster ==
On 7 February 2009.

Rider	Date of birth
John-Lee Augustyn (RSA)	10 August 1986 (aged 22)
Francesco Bellotti (ITA)	6 August 1979 (aged 29)
Diego Caccia (ITA)	31 July 1981 (aged 27)
Patrick Calcagni (SUI)	5 July 1977 (aged 31)
Félix Cárdenas (COL)	24 November 1972 (aged 36)
Giampaolo Cheula (ITA)	23 May 1979 (aged 29)
Marco Corti (ITA)	15 June 1985 (aged 23)
Steve Cummings (GBR)	19 March 1981 (aged 27)

Rider	Date of birth
Chris Froome (GBR)	20 May 1985 (aged 23)
Robert Hunter (RSA)	22 April 1977 (aged 31)
Daryl Impey (RSA)	6 December 1984 (aged 24)
Paolo Longo Borghini (ITA)	10 December 1980 (aged 28)
Michele Merlo (ITA)	7 August 1984 (aged 24)
Carlo Scognamiglio (ITA)	31 May 1983 (aged 25)
Mauricio Soler (COL)	14 January 1983 (aged 26)
Geraint Thomas (GBR)	25 May 1986 (aged 22)

== See also ==
- List of teams and cyclists in the 2008 Tour de France
- 2008 Tour de France
- Tour de France
