= 2003 Tour Down Under =

5th edition of the Tour Down Under stage race

Race details
- Dates: 21—26 January 2003
- Stages: 6
- Winning time: 17h 17' 45"

Results
| Jersey awarded to the overall winner | Winner | Mikel Astarloza (ESP) | (AG2R Prévoyance) |
| | Second | Lennie Kristensen (DEN) | (Team CSC) |
| | Third | Stuart O'Grady (AUS) | (Crédit Agricole) |
| Jersey awarded to the points classification winner | Points | Andrea Tafi (ITA) | (Team CSC) |
| Jersey awarded to the mountains classification winner | Mountains | Cadel Evans (AUS) | (Team Telekom) |
| Jersey awarded to the young rider classification winner | Young rider | Gene Bates (AUS) | (Team UniSA) |
| | Team | ONCE-Eroski | |

The 2003 Tour Down Under was the fifth edition of the Tour Down Under stage race. It took place from 21 to 26 January in and around Adelaide, South Australia. This edition was won by Mikel Astarloza, who rode for AG2R Prévoyance.

== Stage 1 ==
21 January 2003 – Adelaide – Adelaide, 50 km

Stage and General Classification after Stage 1

| | Cyclist | Team | Time |
|---|---|---|---|
| 1 | Baden Cooke (AUS) | FDJeux.com | |
| 2 | Robbie McEwen (AUS) | Lotto–Domo | s.t. |
| 3 | Luca Paolini (ITA) | Quick-Step–Davitamon | s.t. |
| 4 | Julian Dean (NZL) | Team CSC | s.t. |
| 5 | Allan Davis (AUS) | ONCE-Eroski | s.t. |
| 6 | Stuart O'Grady (AUS) | Crédit Agricole | s.t. |
| 7 | Dirk Reichl (GER) | Team Telekom | s.t. |
| 8 | Brett Aitken (AUS) | Team UniSA | s.t. |
| 9 | Mark Renshaw (AUS) | United Water | s.t. |
| 10 | Stefano Zanini (ITA) | Saeco | s.t. |

== Stage 2 ==
22 January 2003 – Jacobs Creek – Kapunda, 140 km

Stage 2 result

| | Cyclist | Team | Time |
|---|---|---|---|
| 1 | Fabio Sacchi (ITA) | Saeco | |
| 2 | Robbie McEwen (AUS) | Lotto–Domo | + 14" |
| 3 | Cédric Herve (FRA) | Crédit Agricole | s.t. |
| 4 | Andy Flickinger (FRA) | AG2R Prévoyance | s.t. |
| 5 | Lennie Kristensen (DEN) | Team CSC | s.t. |
| 6 | Mikel Astarloza (ESP) | AG2R Prévoyance | s.t. |
| 7 | Bradley McGee (AUS) | FDJeux.com | + 23" |
| 8 | Gene Bates (AUS) | Team UniSA | s.t. |
| 9 | Daniele Nardello (ITA) | Team Telekom | s.t. |
| 10 | Xavier Florencio (ESP) | ONCE-Eroski | s.t. |

== Stage 3 ==
23 January 2003 – Glenelg – Hahndorf, 164 km

Stage 3 result

| | Cyclist | Team | Time |
|---|---|---|---|
| 1 | Robbie McEwen (AUS) | Lotto–Domo | |
| 2 | Graeme Brown (AUS) | Ceramiche Panaria–Fiordo | s.t. |
| 3 | Stuart O'Grady (AUS) | Crédit Agricole | s.t. |
| 4 | Allan Davis (AUS) | ONCE-Eroski | s.t. |
| 5 | Luca Paolini (ITA) | Quick-Step–Davitamon | s.t. |
| 6 | Tom Boonen (BEL) | Quick-Step–Davitamon | s.t. |
| 7 | Jaan Kirsipuu (EST) | AG2R Prévoyance | s.t. |
| 8 | Dirk Reichl (GER) | Team Telekom | s.t. |
| 9 | Andy Flickinger (FRA) | AG2R Prévoyance | s.t. |
| 10 | Mark Scanlon (IRL) | AG2R Prévoyance | s.t. |

== Stage 4 ==
24 January 2003 – Unley – Goolwa, 144 km

Stage 4 result

| | Cyclist | Team | Time |
|---|---|---|---|
| 1 | Baden Cooke (AUS) | FDJeux.com | |
| 2 | Graeme Brown (AUS) | Ceramiche Panaria–Fiordo | s.t. |
| 3 | Stuart O'Grady (AUS) | Crédit Agricole | s.t. |
| 4 | Robbie McEwen (AUS) | Lotto–Domo | s.t. |
| 5 | Ashley Hutchinson (AUS) | United Water | s.t. |
| 6 | Tom Boonen (BEL) | Quick-Step–Davitamon | s.t. |
| 7 | Luke Roberts (AUS) | Team UniSA | s.t. |
| 8 | Mark Scanlon (IRL) | AG2R Prévoyance | s.t. |
| 9 | Jaan Kirsipuu (EST) | AG2R Prévoyance | s.t. |
| 10 | Allan Davis (AUS) | ONCE-Eroski | s.t. |

== Stage 5 ==
25 January 2003 – Willunga – Willunga, 147 km

Stage 5 result

| | Cyclist | Team | Time |
|---|---|---|---|
| | ~~Giampaolo Caruso (ITA)~~ | ~~ONCE-Eroski~~ | |
| 1 | Steffen Wesemann (SUI) | Team Telekom | s.t. |
| 2 | Paolo Lanfranchi (ITA) | Ceramiche Panaria–Fiordo | s.t. |
| 3 | Stuart O'Grady (AUS) | Crédit Agricole | s.t. |
| 4 | Lennie Kristensen (DEN) | Team CSC | s.t. |
| 5 | Mikel Astarloza (ESP) | AG2R Prévoyance | s.t. |
| 6 | Xavier Florencio (ESP) | ONCE-Eroski | s.t. |
| 7 | David Cañada (ESP) | Quick-Step–Davitamon | s.t. |
| 8 | Patrick Jonker (AUS) | Team UniSA | s.t. |
| 9 | Cadel Evans (AUS) | Team Telekom | + 6" |

== Stage 6 ==
26 January 2003 – Adelaide – Adelaide, 90 km

Stage 6 result

| | Cyclist | Team | Time |
|---|---|---|---|
| 1 | Graeme Brown (AUS) | Ceramiche Panaria–Fiordo | |
| 2 | Baden Cooke (AUS) | FDJeux.com | s.t. |
| 3 | Jaan Kirsipuu (EST) | AG2R Prévoyance | s.t. |
| 4 | Stuart O'Grady (AUS) | Crédit Agricole | s.t. |
| 5 | Tom Boonen (BEL) | Quick-Step–Davitamon | s.t. |
| 6 | Nicola Gavazzi (ITA) | Saeco | s.t. |
| 7 | Stefan Schumacher (GER) | Team Telekom | s.t. |
| 8 | Bernhard Eisel (AUT) | FDJeux.com | s.t. |
| 9 | Julian Dean (NZL) | Team CSC | s.t. |
| 10 | Luke Roberts (AUS) | Team UniSA | s.t. |

== Final standings ==
=== General classification ===
| | Cyclist | Team | Time |
|---|---|---|---|
| 1 | Mikel Astarloza (ESP) | AG2R Prévoyance | 17h 17' 45" |
| 2 | Lennie Kristensen (DEN) | Team CSC | + 0" |
| 3 | Stuart O'Grady (AUS) | Crédit Agricole | + 4" |
| ~~4~~ | ~~Giampaolo Caruso (ITA)~~ | ~~ONCE-Eroski~~ | + 4" |
| 4 | Paolo Lanfranchi (ITA) | Ceramiche Panaria–Fiordo | + 6" |
| 5 | Xavier Florencio (ESP) | ONCE-Eroski | + 7" |
| 6 | Patrick Jonker (AUS) | Team UniSA | + 9" |
| 7 | David Cañada (ESP) | Quick-Step–Davitamon | + 13" |
| 8 | Steffen Wesemann (SUI) | Team Telekom | + 15" |
| 9 | Cadel Evans (AUS) | Team Telekom | + 15" |

=== Points Classification ===
| | Rider | Team | Points |
|---|---|---|---|
| 1 | Andrea Tafi (ITA) | Team CSC | 34 |
| 2 | Baden Cooke (AUS) | FDJeux.com | 22 |
| 3 | Jaan Kirsipuu (EST) | AG2R Prévoyance | 16 |
| ~~4~~ | ~~Giampaolo Caruso (ITA)~~ | ~~ONCE-Eroski~~ | 14 |
| 4 | Fabio Sacchi (ITA) | Saeco | 12 |
| 5 | Graeme Brown (AUS) | Ceramiche Panaria–Fiordo | 12 |
| 6 | Russel Van Hout (AUS) | Team UniSA | 12 |
| 7 | Adrian Laidler (AUS) | Team UniSA | 12 |
| 8 | Matt Wilson (AUS) | FDJeux.com | 12 |
| 9 | Stuart O'Grady (AUS) | Crédit Agricole | 10 |

=== King of the Mountains classification ===
| | Rider | Team | Points |
|---|---|---|---|
| 1 | Cadel Evans (AUS) | Team Telekom | 44 |
| 2 | Lennie Kristensen (DEN) | Team CSC | 44 |
| 3 | Paolo Lanfranchi (ITA) | Ceramiche Panaria–Fiordo | 36 |
| 4 | Igor González de Galdeano (ESP) | ONCE-Eroski | 22 |
| 5 | Russell Van Hout (AUS) | Team UniSA | 16 |
| 6 | Glenn D'Hollander (BEL) | Lotto–Domo | 16 |
| 7 | Andy Flickinger (FRA) | AG2R Prévoyance | 16 |
| ~~8~~ | ~~Giampaolo Caruso (ITA)~~ | ~~ONCE-Eroski~~ | 12 |
| 8 | Íñigo Chaurreau (ESP) | AG2R Prévoyance | 12 |
| 9 | Gert Steegmans (BEL) | Lotto–Domo | 12 |

=== Young Riders' classification ===
| | Rider | Team | Time |
|---|---|---|---|
| 1 | Gene Bates (AUS) | Team UniSA | 17h 18′ 30" |
| 2 | Dirk Reichl (GER) | Team Telekom | + 6′ 56" |
| 3 | Brendan Cato (AUS) | United Water | + 11′ 30" |
| 4 | Bernhard Eisel (AUT) | FDJeux.com | + 11′ 38" |
| 5 | Stefan Schumacher (GER) | Team Telekom | + 16′ 08" |
