= 2005 UCI Oceania Tour =

- First edition of the UCI Oceania Tour

Details
- Dates: 18 January 2005–30 January 2005
- Location: Oceania
- Races: 2

Champions
- Individual champion: Robert McLachlan (AUS) (MG XPower Presented by BigPond)
- Teams' champion: MG XPower Presented by BigPond
- Nations' champion: Australia

The 2005 UCI Oceania Tour was the first season of the UCI Oceania Tour. The season began on 18 January 2005 with the Tour Down Under and ended on 30 January 2005 with the Tour of Wellington.

The points leader, based on the cumulative results of previous races, wears the UCI Oceania Tour cycling jersey. Robert McLachlan of Australia was crowned as the 2005 UCI Oceania Tour champion.

Throughout the season, points are awarded to the top finishers of stages within stage races and the final general classification standings of each of the stages races and one-day events. The quality and complexity of a race also determines how many points are awarded to the top finishers, the higher the UCI rating of a race, the more points are awarded. The UCI ratings from highest to lowest are as follows:

- Multi-day events: 2.HC, 2.1 and 2.2
- One-day events: 1.HC, 1.1 and 1.2

== Events ==
Date	Race Name	Location	UCI Rating	Winner	Team
18–23 January	Tour Down Under	Australia	2.HC	Luis León Sánchez (ESP)	Liberty Seguros
26–30 January	Tour of Wellington	New Zealand	2.2	Matthew Lloyd (AUS)	Australia (national team)

== Final standings ==
=== Individual classification ===
Rank	Name	Points
1.	Robert McLachlan (AUS)	85
2.	William Walker (AUS)	70
3.	Peter Latham (NZL)	62
4.	Matthew Lloyd (AUS)	61
5.	Paride Grillo (ITA)	42
6.	Paul Crake (AUS)	40
7.	Fraser MacMaster (NZL)	37
8.	David McPartland (AUS)	34
9.	Simon Gerrans (AUS)	29
10.	Christopher Sutton (AUS)	25

=== Team classification ===
Rank	Team	Points
1.	MG XPower Presented by BigPond	105
2.	Rabobank Continental Team	70
3.	Ceramica Panaria–Navigare	61
4.	AG2R Prévoyance	50
5.	Graz Corratec	40
6.	Volksbank–Leingrüber Ideal	37
7.	Tenax-Nobili Rubinetterie	34
8.	Ceramica Panaria–Navigare	28
9.	Cofidis	25
10.	Kodakgallery.com-Sierra Nevada	20

=== Nation classification ===
Rank	Nation	Points
1.	Australia	1381
2.	New Zealand	407
