= 2007 Tour Down Under =

9th edition of the Tour Down Under stage race

UCI Oceania Tour

Race details
- Dates: 16—21 January 2007
- Stages: 6
- Winning time: 15h 46' 38"

Results
Jersey awarded to the overall winner	Winner	Martin Elmiger (SUI)	(AG2R Prévoyance)
	Second	Karl Menzies (AUS)	(Team UniSA–Australia)
	Third	Lars Bak (DEN)	(Team CSC)
Jersey awarded to the points classification winner	Points	Laurent Brochard (FRA)	(Bouygues Télécom)
Jersey awarded to the mountains classification winner	Mountains	Serge Pauwels (BEL)	(Chocolade Jacques–Topsport Vlaanderen)
Jersey awarded to the young rider classification winner	Young rider	Simon Clarke (AUS)	(Team AIS)
	Team	Team AIS	

The 2007 Tour Down Under was held from 16 to 21 January 2007 in and around Adelaide, South Australia. The ninth edition of the Tour Down Under, the race was a multiple stage road cycling race that took part over five stages with a total of 667 kilometres and was part of the 2006–07 UCI Oceania Tour. The 2007 Down Under Classic was the official warm-up race for the event.

The race was won by Swiss rider Martin Elmiger of AG2R Prévoyance. A women's event was also held in support of the race, won by Australian rider Jenny MacPherson.

== Men's stage summary ==
Stage	Date	Start	Finish	Distance	Stage Top 3	Leading Top 3	Time
1	17 January	Mawson Lakes	Tanunda	152 km	(Australia) Karl Menzies (Switzerland) Martin Elmiger (Denmark) Lars Bak	(Australia) Karl Menzies (Switzerland) Martin Elmiger (Denmark) Lars Bak	3:50.45 + 0.01 + 0.07
2	18 January	Mannum	Hahndorf	150 km	(Belgium) Steven Caethoven (Belgium) Pieter Ghyllebert (Australia) Stuart O'Grady	(Australia) Karl Menzies (Switzerland) Martin Elmiger (Denmark) Lars Bak	7:44.33 + 0.01 + 0.07
3	19 January	Stirling	Victor Harbor	128 km	(Australia) Baden Cooke (Australia) Chris Jongewaard (Australia) Matthew Goss	(Australia) Karl Menzies (Switzerland) Martin Elmiger (Denmark) Lars Bak	10:36.38 + 0.01 + 0.07
4	20 January	Willunga	Willunga	147 km	(Belgium) Pieter Ghyllebert (Uzbekistan) Sergey Lagutin (Switzerland) Martin Elmiger	(Switzerland) Martin Elmiger (Australia) Karl Menzies (Denmark) Lars Bak	14:02.15 + 0.01 + 0.08
5	21 January	Adelaide	Adelaide	90 km	(Australia) Robbie McEwen (Australia) Mark Renshaw (Australia) Allan Davis	(Switzerland) Martin Elmiger (Australia) Karl Menzies (Denmark) Lars Bak	15:46.38 + 0.03 + 0.11

== Other leading top threes ==
Stage	Mountains	Pts	Sprint	Pts	Under 23	Pts	Teams	Time
1	(Belgium) Serge Pauwels (Sweden) Gustav Larsson (Italy) Paolo Longo Borghini	16; 12; 8	(Australia) Gene Bates (Australia) Luke Roberts (Australia) Karl Menzies	10; 10; 8	(Australia) Simon Clarke (New Zealand) Clinton Avery (Australia) Michael Ford	3:51.49 + 23.37 + 25.17	Team CSC; SouthAustralia.com–AIS; Predictor–Lotto	11:59.36 + 0.55 + 2.13
2	(Belgium) Serge Pauwels (France) Samuel Dumoulin (Sweden) Gustav Larsson	16; 16; 12	(Australia) Luke Roberts (Australia) Gene Bates (Australia) Wesley Sulzberger	10; 10; 10	(Australia) Simon Clarke (Belgium) Pieter Jacobs (Australia) Wesley Sulzberger	7:45.37 + 8.58 + 15.09	SouthAustralia.com–AIS; Chocolade Jacques; Crédit Agricole	23:14.41 + 2.49 + 7.52
3	(France) Samuel Dumoulin (Belgium) Serge Pauwels (Italy) Giampaolo Cheula	28; 16; 16	(Belarus) Viktor Rapinski (Australia) Luke Roberts (Australia) Gene Bates	12; 10; 10	(Australia) Simon Clarke (Belgium) Pieter Jacobs (Australia) Matthew Goss	10:37.42 + 9.14 + 11.22	SouthAustralia.com–AIS; Team CSC; Unibet.com Cycling Team	31:29.02 + 3.35 + 14.46
4	(France) Samuel Dumoulin (Belgium) Serge Pauwels (Italy) Giampaolo Cheula	28; 16; 16	(France) Laurent Brochard (Belgium) Pieter Ghyllebert (Belarus) Viktor Rapinski	20; 14; 12	(Australia) Simon Clarke (Belgium) Pieter Jacobs (Australia) Matthew Goss	14:03.20 + 9.25 + 11.58	SouthAustralia.com–AIS; Team CSC; Unibet.com Cycling Team	41:45.56 + 3.35 + 15.04
5	(Belgium) Serge Pauwels (France) Samuel Dumoulin (Italy) Giampaolo Cheula	32; 28; 24	(France) Laurent Brochard (Switzerland) Martin Elmiger (Belgium) Pieter Ghyllebert	26; 18; 14	(Australia) Simon Clarke (Belgium) Pieter Jacobs (Australia) Matthew Goss	15:48.21 + 9.02 + 12.17	SouthAustralia.com–AIS; Team CSC; Unibet.com Cycling Team	46:59.14 + 3.35 + 15.04

=== Men's top 10 overall ===
Pos	Rider	Time
1	(Switzerland) Martin Elmiger	15:46.38
2	(Australia) Karl Menzies	+ 0.03
3	(Denmark) Lars Bak	+ 0.11
4	(Australia) Matthew Lloyd	+ 0.13
5	(Sweden) Gustav Larsson	+ 0.21
6	(Australia) Luke Roberts	+ 0.50
7	(Australia) Gene Bates	+ 0.50
8	(Italy) Paolo Longo Borghini	+ 0.55
9	(France) Yannick Talabardon	+ 0.55
10	(Australia) Simon Clarke	+ 1.43

== Women's stage summary ==
Stage	Date	Start	Finish	Distance	Stage Top 3	Leading Top 3	Points
1	16 January	East end Adelaide street race		30 mins + 1 lap	(Australia) Jenny MacPherson (Australia) Emma Mackie (Australia) Belinda Goss	(Australia) Jenny MacPherson (Australia) Emma Mackie (Australia) Belinda Goss	40; 38; 36
2	17 January	Tanunda Street Circuit		30 mins + 1 lap	(Australia) Belinda Goss (Australia) Petra Mullens (Australia) Bridgette Evans	(Australia) Belinda Goss (Australia) Jenny MacPherson (Australia) Petra Mullens	76; 74; 70
3	20 January	Snapper Point (Aldinga Beach) Criterium		30 mins + 1 lap	(Australia) Jenny MacPherson (Australia) Belinda Goss (Australia) Petra Mullens	(Australia) Jenny MacPherson (Australia) Belinda Goss (Australia) Petra Mullens	114; 114; 106
