= 2004 Tour Down Under =

6th edition of the Tour Down Under stage race

Race details
- Dates: 20—25 January 2004
- Stages: 6
- Winning time: 16h 32' 19"

Results
Jersey awarded to the overall winner	Winner	Patrick Jonker (AUS)	(Team UniSA)
	Second	Robbie McEwen (AUS)	(Lotto–Domo)
	Third	Baden Cooke (AUS)	(FDJeux.com)
Jersey awarded to the points classification winner	Points	Robbie McEwen (AUS)	(Lotto–Domo)
Jersey awarded to the mountains classification winner	Mountains	Paolo Tiralongo (ITA)	(Ceramica Panaria–Margres)
Jersey awarded to the young rider classification winner	Young rider	Philippe Gilbert (BEL)	(FDJeux.com)
	Team	Team UniSA	

The 2004 Tour Down Under, known as Jacob's Creek Tour Down Under for sponsorship reasons, was the sixth edition of the Tour Down Under stage race. It took place from 20 January to 25 January in and around Adelaide, South Australia and was the first major stage race of the season. The race was won by Patrick Jonker, who rode for Team UniSA.

== Stages ==
=== Stage 1 ===
20 January 2004 – Adelaide - Adelaide, 50 km (31 mi)

Stage and General Classification after Stage 1

	Cyclist	Team	Time
1	Robbie McEwen (AUS)	Lotto–Domo	
2	Rudi Kemna (NED)	BankGiroLoterij	s.t.
3	Mark Renshaw (AUS)	FDJeux.com	s.t.
4	Graeme Brown (AUS)	Ceramica Panaria–Margres	s.t.
5	Nicolas Vogondy (FRA)	FDJeux.com	s.t.
6	Nicolas Portal (FRA)	AG2R Prévoyance	s.t.
7	David McKenzie (AUS)	Navigators Insurance	s.t.
8	Peter Dawson (AUS)	UnitedWater	s.t.
9	Cédric Hervé (FRA)	Crédit Agricole	s.t.
10	Dave McPartland (AUS)	Australia - national team	s.t.

=== Stage 2 ===
21 January 2004 – Norwood to Kapunda, 157 km (98 mi)

Stage 2 Result

	Cyclist	Team	Time
1	Dave McPartland (AUS)	Australia - national team	
2	Alain van Katwijk (NED)	BankGiroLoterij	+ 1"
3	Patrick Jonker (AUS)	Team UniSA	s.t.
4	Baden Cooke (AUS)	FDJeux.com	+ 1' 41"
5	Robbie McEwen (AUS)	Lotto–Domo	s.t.
6	Murilo Fischer (BRA)	Domina Vacanze	s.t.
7	Allan Davis (AUS)	Australia - national team	s.t.
8	Massimiliano Gentili (ITA)	Domina Vacanze	s.t.
9	Jaan Kirsipuu (EST)	AG2R Prévoyance	s.t.
10	Luke Roberts (AUS)	Team UniSA	s.t.

=== Stage 3 ===
22 January 2004 – Goolwa - Victor Harbor, 150 km (93 mi)

Stage 3 Result

	Cyclist	Team	Time
1	Philippe Gilbert (BEL)	FDJeux.com	
2	Gene Bates (AUS)	Team UniSA	s.t.
3	Robbie McEwen (AUS)	Lotto–Domo	s.t.
4	Baden Cooke (AUS)	FDJeux.com	s.t.
5	Giuliano Figueras (ITA)	Ceramica Panaria–Margres	s.t.
6	David McKenzie (AUS)	Navigators Insurance	s.t.
7	Massimo Giunti (ITA)	Domina Vacanze	s.t.
8	Luke Roberts (AUS)	Team UniSA	s.t.
9	Murilo Fischer (BRA)	Domina Vacanze	s.t.
10	Kevin Hulsmans (BEL)	Quick-Step–Davitamon	s.t.

=== Stage 4 ===
23 January 2004 – Unley - Hahndorf, 141 km (88 mi)

Stage 4 Result

	Cyclist	Team	Time
1	Robbie McEwen (AUS)	Lotto–Domo	
2	Aurelien Clerc (SUI)	Quick-Step–Davitamon	s.t.
3	Baden Cooke (AUS)	FDJeux.com	s.t.
4	Allan Davis (AUS)	Australia - national team	s.t.
5	David McKenzie (AUS)	Navigators Insurance	s.t.
6	Erki Pütsep (EST)	AG2R Prévoyance	s.t.
7	Julian Dean (AUS)	Crédit Agricole	s.t.
8	Mark Scanlon (IRL)	AG2R Prévoyance	s.t.
9	Rudi Kemna (NED)	BankGiroLoterij	s.t.
10	Murilo Fischer (BRA)	Domina Vacanze	s.t.

=== Stage 5 ===
24 January 2004 – Willunga - Willunga, 147 km (91 mi)

Stage 5 result

	Cyclist	Team	Time
1	Ben Day (AUS)	Australia - national team	
2	Robbie McEwen (AUS)	Lotto–Domo	+ 4"
3	Baden Cooke (AUS)	FDJeux.com	s.t.
4	Allan Davis (AUS)	Australia - national team	s.t.
5	Murilo Fischer (BRA)	Domina Vacanze	s.t.
6	Giuliano Figueras (ITA)	Ceramica Panaria–Margres	s.t.
7	Luke Roberts (AUS)	Team UniSA	s.t.
8	Massimo Giunti (ITA)	Domina Vacanze	s.t.
9	Philippe Gilbert (BEL)	FDJeux.com	s.t.
10	Nicolas Portal (FRA)	AG2R Prévoyance	s.t.

=== Stage 6 ===
25 January 2004 – Adelaide - Adelaide, 90 km (56 mi)

Stage 6 result

	Cyclist	Team	Time
1	Baden Cooke (AUS)	FDJeux.com	1h 43' 19"
2	Robbie McEwen (AUS)	Lotto–Domo	s.t.
3	Allan Davis (AUS)	Australia - national team	s.t.
4	Mark Renshaw (AUS)	FDJeux.com	s.t.
5	Jaan Kirsipuu (EST)	AG2R Prévoyance	s.t.
6	Rudi Kemna (NED)	BankGiroLoterij	s.t.
7	Graeme Brown (AUS)	Ceramica Panaria–Margres	s.t.
8	Aurelien Clerc (SUI)	Quick-Step–Davitamon	s.t.
9	Murilo Fischer (BRA)	Domina Vacanze	s.t.
10	Giuliano Figueras (ITA)	Ceramica Panaria–Margres	s.t.

== Final standings ==
=== General classification ===
	Cyclist	Team	Time
1	Patrick Jonker (AUS)	Team UniSA	16h 32' 19"
2	Robbie McEwen (AUS)	Lotto–Domo	+ 1' 13"
3	Baden Cooke (AUS)	FDJeux.com	+ 1' 21"
4	Philippe Gilbert (BEL)	FDJeux.com	+ 1' 28"
5	Massimo Giunti (ITA)	Domina Vacanze	+ 1' 28"
6	Murilo Fischer (BRA)	Domina Vacanze	+ 1' 29"
7	Giuliano Figueras (ITA)	Ceramica Panaria–Margres	+ 1' 30"
8	Alexander Bocharov (RUS)	Crédit Agricole	+ 1' 31"
9	Luke Roberts (AUS)	Team UniSA	+ 1' 47"
10	Gene Bates (AUS)	Team UniSA	+ 2' 56"

=== Points Classification ===
	Rider	Team	Points
1	Robbie McEwen (AUS)	Lotto–Domo	36
2	Aurelien Clerc (SUI)	Quick-Step–Davitamon	30
3	David McPartland (AUS)	Australia - national team	18
4	Baden Cooke (AUS)	FDJeux.com	16
5	Patrick Jonker (AUS)	Team UniSA	16
6	Philippe Gilbert (BEL)	FDJeux.com	14
7	Eric Leblacher (FRA)	Crédit Agricole	10
8	Mark Renshaw (AUS)	FDJeux.com	10
9	Alain van Katwijk (NED)	BankGiroLoterij	10
10	Erki Pütsep (EST)	AG2R Prévoyance	8

=== King of the Mountains classification ===
	Rider	Team	Points
1	Paolo Tiralongo (ITA)	Ceramica Panaria–Margres	32
2	Massimiliano Gentili (ITA)	Domina Vacanze	28
3	David McPartland (AUS)	Australia - national team	24
4	Allan Davis (AUS)	Australia - national team	16
5	Alain van Katwijk (NED)	BankGiroLoterij	16
6	Lorenzo Cardellini (ITA)	Domina Vacanze	16
7	Russel van Hout (AUS)	Team UniSA	14
8	Patrick Jonker (AUS)	Team UniSA	12
9	Giuliano Figueras (ITA)	Ceramica Panaria–Margres	12
10	Kevin Hulsmans (BEL)	Quick-Step–Davitamon	12

=== Young Riders' classification ===
	Rider	Team	Time
1	Philippe Gilbert (BEL)	FDJeux.com	16h 33′ 47"
2	Thomas Löfkvist (SWE)	FDJeux.com	+ 36′ 41"
3	Mark Renshaw (AUS)	FDJeux.com	+ 1h 03′ 16"
4	Ashley Humbert (AUS)	United Water	+ 1h 03′ 55"
5	Bernard Sulzberger (AUS)	United Water	+ 1h 10′ 21"
