= Gene Bates =

Australian cyclist (born 1981)

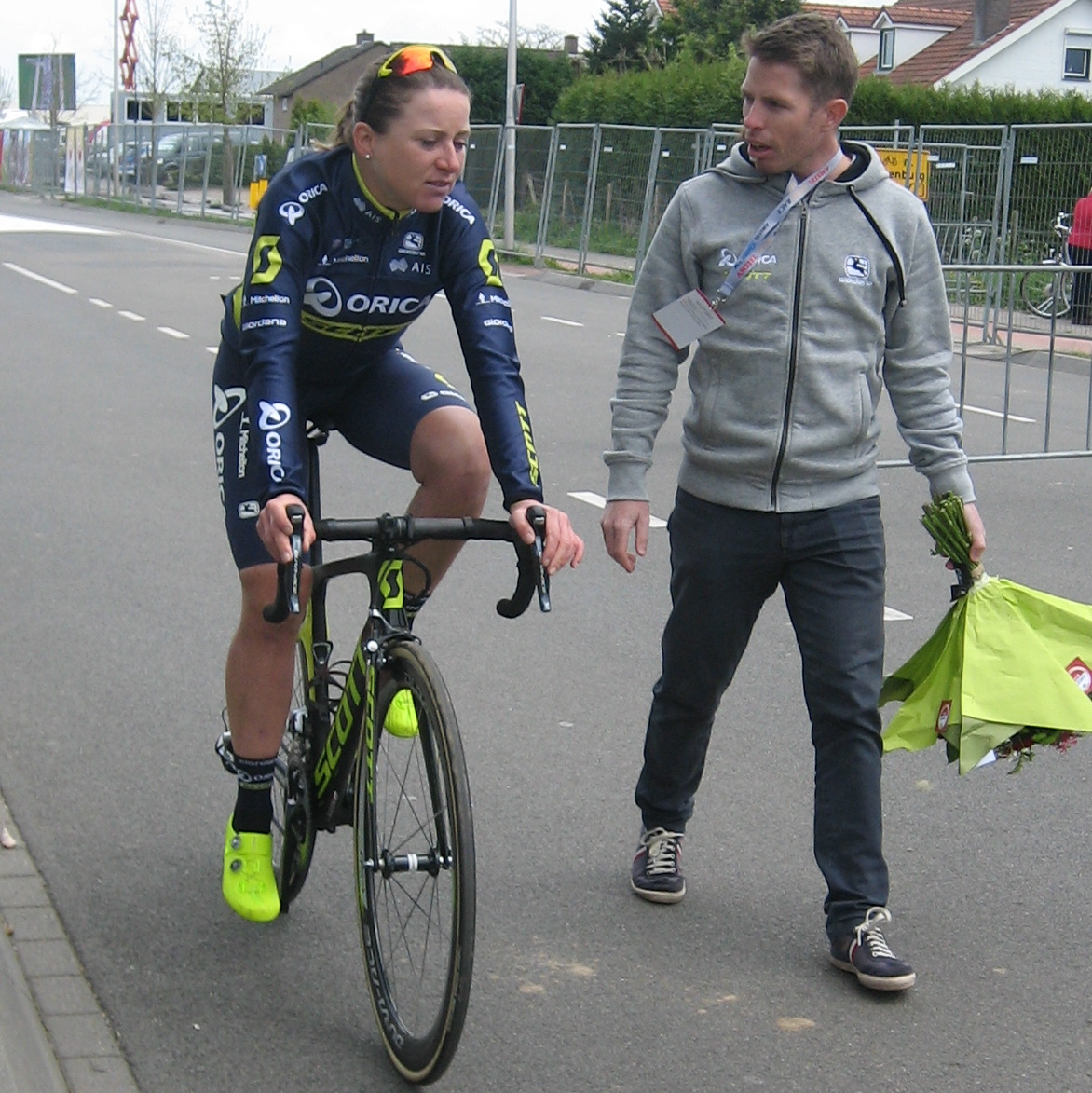
- Gene Bates next to Annemiek van Vleuten

Personal information
- Full name: Gene Michael Bates
- Nickname: Geno
- Born: 4 July 1981 (age 45) Stirling, South Australia, Australia
- Height: 1.69 m (5 ft 7 in)
- Weight: 61 kg (134 lb; 9.6 st)

Cycling career
- Sport: Cycling
- Current team: Liv AlUla Jayco
- Discipline: Road
- Role: Rider (retired); Directeur sportif

Amateur teams
- 2003: Crédit Agricole (stagiaire)
- 2004: Saeco (stagiaire)
- 2005: Zalf Desiree Fior

Professional teams
- 2006: LPR
- 2007: SouthAustralia.com–AIS
- 2008–2009: Drapac Porsche Cycling

Managerial teams
- 2011: Jayco–AIS
- 2014–: Orica–AIS

Gene Bates (born 4 July 1981) is an Australian cyclist, last riding for the Drapac Porsche Cycling. Bates is currently the sporting director for UCI Women's team Liv AlUla Jayco and has been since 2014.

== Career ==
Bates began his professional career in 2006 with the Italian team LPR Brakes. In 2003 Bates won the Australian Under 23 road championship, and he joined Crédit Agricole for a period as a stagiaire. This did not lead to a professional contract so he served a further period as a stagiaire for Saeco the following year. In the 2006 Tour Down Under he finished 5th overall. He also put in a strong showing at the Tour de Langkawi, finishing second in a stage behind Laurent Mangel.

After cycling professionally, worked as assistant team manager for Jayco–AIS in 2011. Bates was appointed as head cycling coach at the end of 2011 until 2013 for the Tasmanian Institute of Sport, and for 2012 and 2013 Bates was endurance coach for Cycling Australia's junior track team. From the start of 2014, Orica–AIS recruited Gene Bates as their DS as the team founding sports director Dave McPartland took up a role with the men's side of Orica–GreenEDGE.

== Major results ==
2001
1st Youth classification Tour Down Under
2003
1st Road race, National Under-23 Road Championships
1st Youth classification Tour Down Under
1st Sprint classification Oberösterreich Rundfahrt

1st Stage 2

1st Giro delle Due Province
7th Coppa della Pace
8th GP Citta di Felino
2004
1st Parma La Spezia
10th Overall Tour Down Under
2005
1st Mountain classification Tour Down Under
1st Piccola Sanremo
2nd Coppa della Pace
2nd Giro del Belvedere
7th Trofeo G. Bianchin
2006
3rd Gran Piemonte
5th Overall Tour Down Under
2007
2nd GP Marmo
7th Overall Tour Down Under
8th Overall Tour of Britain
2009
3rd Halle–Ingooigem
