= Giampaolo Caruso =

Italian road bicycle racer (born 1980)

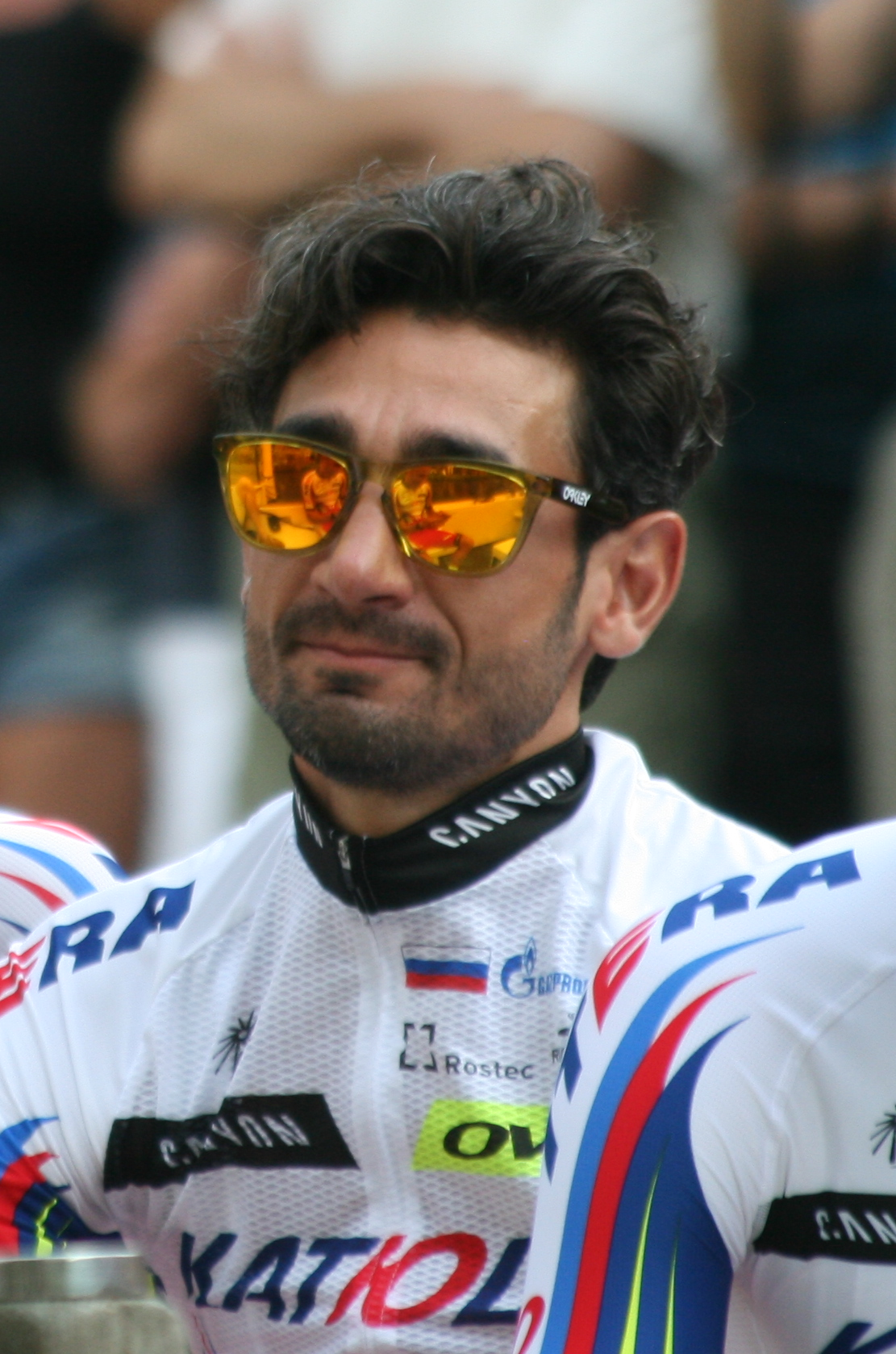
- Caruso at the 2015 Tour de France

Personal information
- Full name: Giampaolo Caruso
- Born: 15 August 1980 (age 46) Avola, Italy
- Height: 1.81 m (5 ft 11 in)
- Weight: 70 kg (154 lb)

Cycling career
- Sport: Cycling
- Current team: Retired
- Discipline: Road
- Role: Rider
- Rider type: Climber

Professional teams
- 2002–2006: ONCE–Eroski
- 2007: Lampre–Fondital
- 2008–2010: Ceramica Flaminia–Bossini Docce
- 2010–2015: Team Katusha

Major wins
- One-day races and Classics Milano–Torino (2014)

Giampaolo Caruso (born 15 August 1980) is an Italian former professional road bicycle racer, who rode professionally between 2002 and 2015 for the Würth, Lampre–Fondital, LPR Brakes–Ballan, Ceramica Flaminia and Team Katusha squads.

During his professional career, Caruso took five victories – all coming in Italy – with three stage wins and the general classification at the 2009 Brixia Tour, and a one-day race success at the 2014 Milano–Torino. He was also twice suspended for doping violations – in 2003, he was given a six-month ban for the use of nandrolone at the 2003 Tour Down Under, and in 2015, he was banned for two years after a positive drugs test for erythropoietin (EPO) recorded three years earlier.

== Career ==
Born in Avola, Caruso spent the first five years of his professional career with the ONCE–Eroski team. In 2003, Caruso initially won a stage of the Tour Down Under, but he tested positive for nandrolone at the race, and was stripped of this result – which was not publicly acknowledged by race organisers until 2012, in the wake of the Lance Armstrong doping case. He was accused in the Operación Puerto doping case, but his case was soon dropped by the Spanish federation. The Italian National Olympic Committee (CONI) wanted him suspended for two years, but he was acquitted of involvement by the Court for Arbitration for Sport (CAS).

=== Ceramica Flaminia–Bossini Docce (2008–2010) ===
After a season with Lampre–Fondital in 2007, Caruso joined Ceramica Flaminia–Bossini Docce in May 2008. He had a contract with the team through 2011, but on 6 April 2010, after the Giro d'Italia organizers had announced that Ceramica Flaminia was not invited to the race, he was allowed to break his contract and to sign with Team Katusha, who assumed the contract through its duration.

=== Team Katusha (2010–2015) ===
Team Katusha signed him mainly in order to be their general classification contender in the Giro d'Italia. In late 2011, he prolonged his contract for another season. During Stage 3 of the 2012 Tour de France many riders were involved in a crash, which led to Caruso having scrapes from another rider's chainring on his chest; he remained in the race, and finished his début Tour de France.

At the 2014 Liège–Bastogne–Liège, Caruso led out of the final corner in Ans, but was overtaken on the run to the finish line by winner Simon Gerrans, Alejandro Valverde and Michał Kwiatkowski, ultimately finishing fourth in the monument. On stage two of the Giro d'Italia Caruso crashed heavily in a feedzone which he went to hospital for in Northern Ireland, but did not pull out of the race until the race returned to Italy, following stage 6. In August 2014, Team Katusha announced they had extended Caruso's contract through to the end of 2016. Caruso's only one-day race win came at October's Milano–Torino where he beat Rinaldo Nocentini to the finish line by three seconds.

In August 2015, it was announced that Caruso had returned a positive test for EPO in March 2012. He was given a two-year ban, and he did not return to the professional peloton.

== Major results ==
2000
1st Giro del Belvedere
3rd Gran Premio di Poggiana
2001
1st Road race, UEC European Under-23 Road Championships
2nd Road race, UCI Under-23 Road World Championships
2nd Trofeo Banca Popolare di Vicenza
3rd Giro del Belvedere
4th Trofeo Alcide Degasperi
5th Gran Premio Palio del Recioto
2002
8th Overall Tour de l'Avenir
9th Overall Paris–Corrèze
2003
~~4th Overall Tour Down Under~~

~~1st Stage 5~~

~~4th Overall Vuelta a Andalucía~~
2004
10th Amstel Gold Race
10th Prueba Villafranca de Ordizia
2005
4th Giro di Lombardia
2006
8th Overall Tour de Suisse
2007
5th Overall Tour of Slovenia
2008
5th Overall Tour of Austria
5th Giro dell'Emilia
6th Overall Euskal Bizikleta
8th Coppa Placci
10th Overall GP CTT Correios de Portugal
10th Giro dell'Appennino
2009
1st Overall Brixia Tour

1st Stages 1b, 2 & 4

3rd Overall Route du Sud
4th Gran Premio Città di Camaiore
5th Trofeo Melinda
7th Overall Tour of Austria
7th Overall Giro del Trentino
7th Giro dell'Appennino
9th Giro della Provincia di Reggio Calabria
10th Overall Settimana Internazionale di Coppi e Bartali
2010
7th Overall Vuelta a Burgos

1st Stage 3 (TTT)

10th Giro di Lombardia
2012
~~3rd Trofeo Melinda~~
2013
4th Overall Vuelta a Burgos
5th GP Miguel Induráin
7th Gran Premio Industria e Commercio di Prato
9th Gran Premio Città di Camaiore
9th Strade Bianche
2014
1st Milano–Torino
4th Liège–Bastogne–Liège
2015
6th Cadel Evans Great Ocean Road Race
10th Strade Bianche

=== Grand Tour general classification results timeline ===
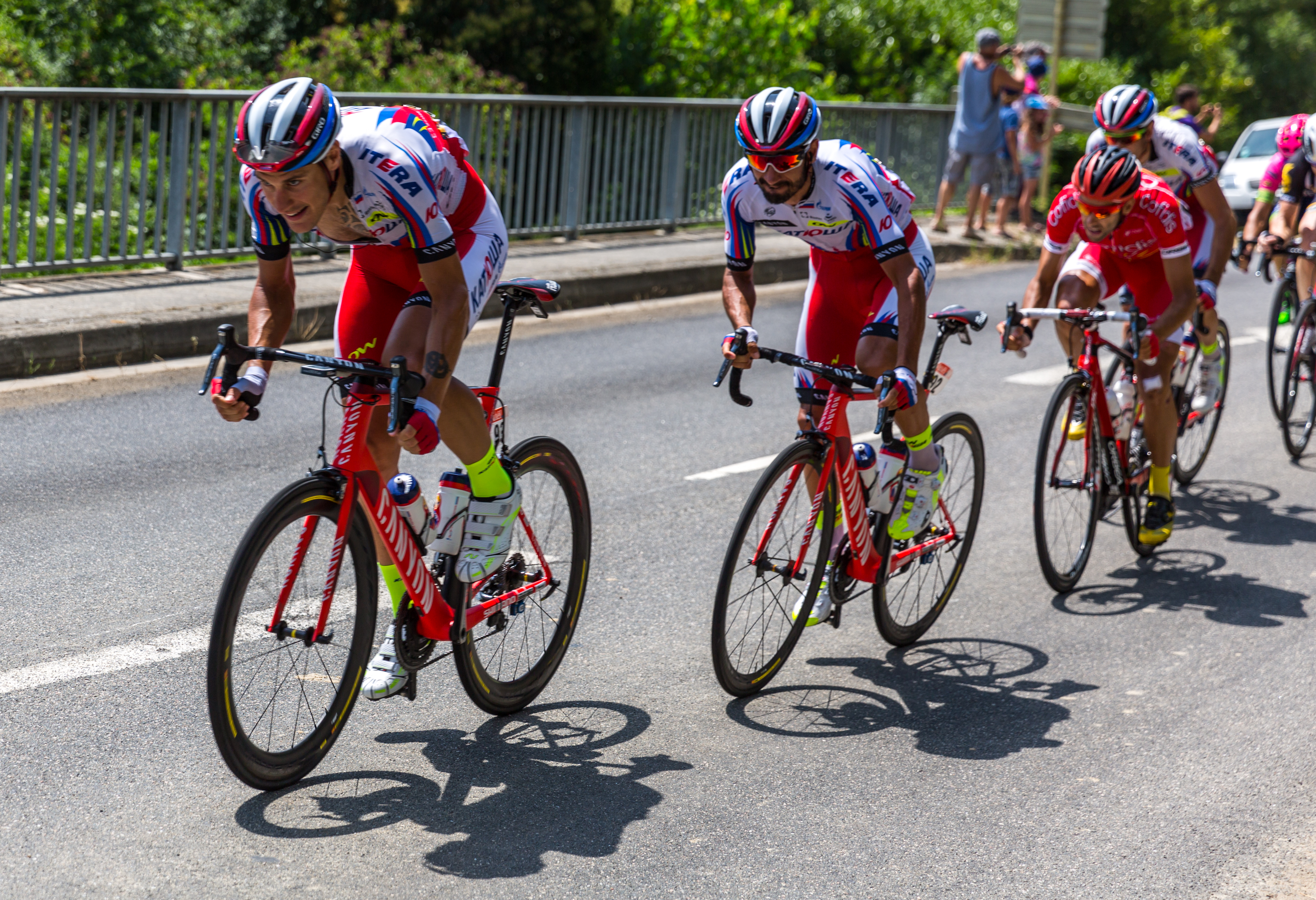
Caruso (second from left) at the 2015 Tour de France, his last appearance at a Grand Tour

Grand Tour	2004	2005	2006	2007	2008	2009	2010	2011	2012	2013	2014	2015
Giro d'Italia	—	19	12	—	—	—	46	42	—	41	DNF	—
Tour de France	—	—	—	—	—	—	—	—	~~37~~	—	—	90
/ Vuelta a España	72	59	—	—	—	—	36	—	—	49	15	—

Legend
—	Did not compete
DNF	Did not finish
~~No.~~	Voided result

== See also ==
- List of doping cases in cycling
