= Andoni Lafuente =

Spanish cyclist

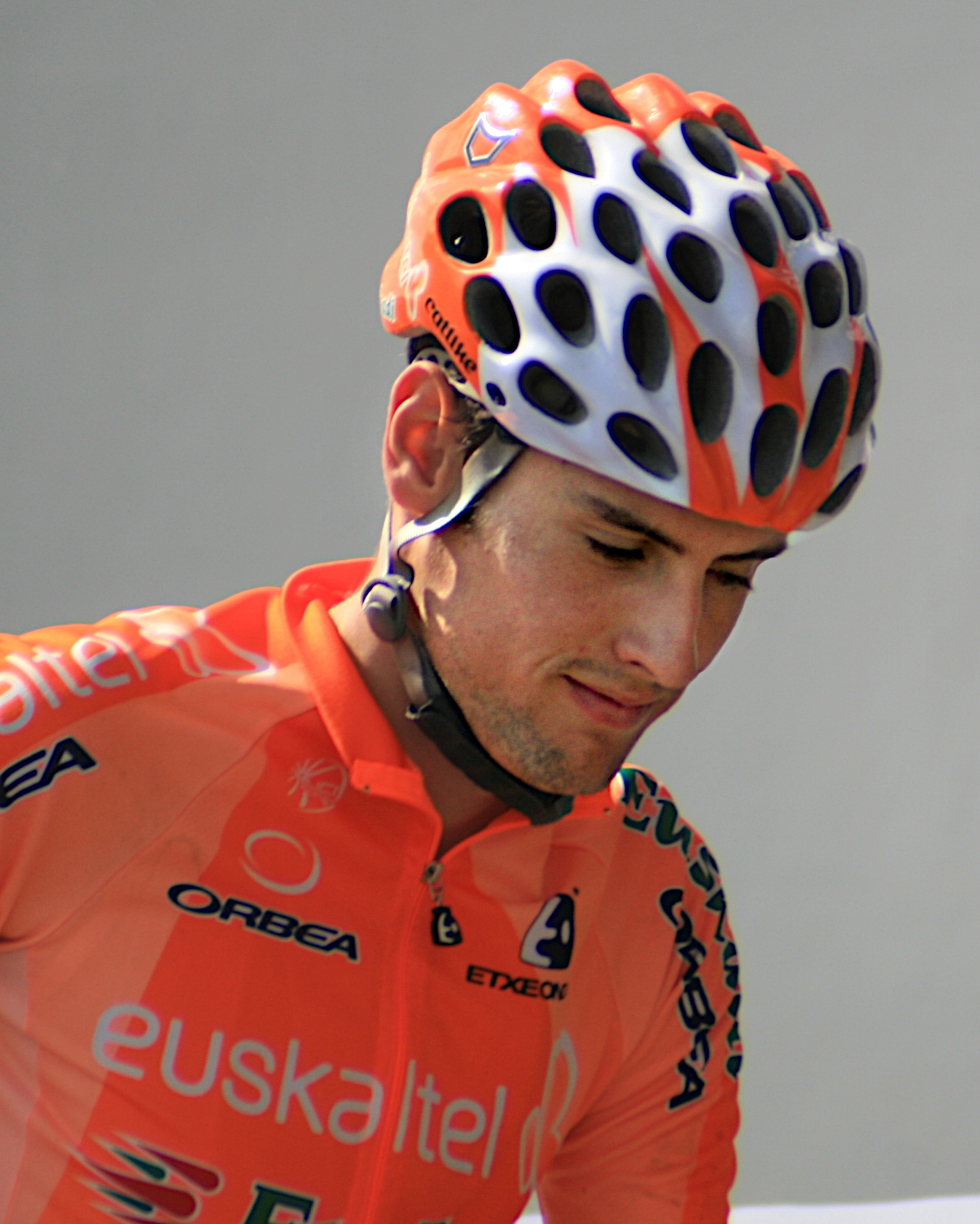

Personal information
- Full name: Andoni Lafuente Olaguibel
- Born: September 6, 1985 (age 41) Guernica, Spain

Cycling career
- Sport: Cycling
- Current team: Unattached
- Disciplines: Road and track
- Role: Rider

Professional team
- 2007–2009: Euskaltel-Euskadi

Andoni Lafuente Olaguibel (born September 6, 1985) is a Spanish professional road and track bicycle racer.

== Palmarès ==
2003
Spain U19 Points Race Champion

- 3rd, Pursuit

2009 Euskaltel - Euskadi

- Winner Mountains Classification 2009 Tour Down Under
