= 2014 Milano–Torino =

95th edition of the Milano–Torino single-day cycling race

2014 UCI Europe Tour

Race details
- Dates: 1 October 2014
- Distance: 193.5 km (120.2 mi)
- Winning time: 4h 30' 12"

Results
	Winner	Giampaolo Caruso (ITA)	(Team Katusha)
	Second	Rinaldo Nocentini (ITA)	(Ag2r–La Mondiale)
	Third	Daniel Moreno (ESP)	(Team Katusha)

The 2014 Milano–Torino was the 95th edition of the Milano–Torino single-day cycling race. It was held on 1 October 2014, over a distance of 193.5 kilometres (120.2 miles), starting near Milan in Settimo Milanese and ending near Turin on the Superga hill (Italian: Colle di Superga). The race was won by Italian cyclist Giampaolo Caruso.

== Notable riders ==
Among the riders, Alberto Contador, winner of the 2012 Milano–Torino, competed. Other notable riders include Alejandro Valverde, Fabio Aru, and Ryder Hesjedal.

== Results ==
Result
Rank	Rider	Team	Time
1	Giampaolo Caruso (ITA)	Team Katusha	4h 30' 12"
2	Rinaldo Nocentini (ITA)	Ag2r–La Mondiale	+ 3"
3	Daniel Moreno (ESP)	Team Katusha	+ 9"
4	Fabio Aru (ITA)	Astana	+ 13"
5	Joaquim Rodríguez (ESP)	Team Katusha	+ 14"
6	Alberto Contador (ESP)	Tinkoff–Saxo	+ 17"
7	Sergey Chernetskiy (RUS)	Team Katusha	+ 19"
8	Davide Rebellin (ITA)	CCC–Polsat–Polkowice	+ 24"
9	Fränk Schleck (LUX)	Trek Factory Racing	+ 40"
10	Mauro Finetto (ITA)	Neri Sottoli	+ 42"
