= Martin Elmiger =

Swiss cyclist (born 1978)

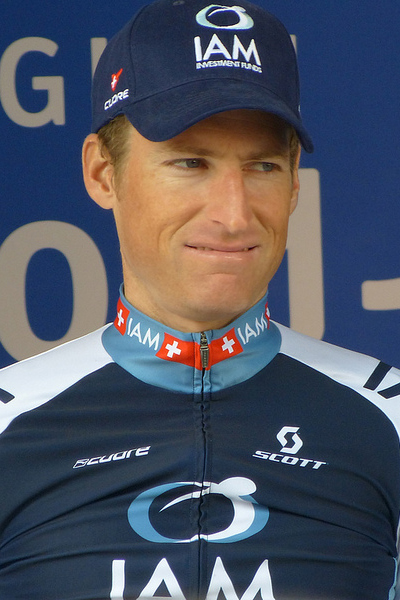
- Elmiger at the 2013 Four Days of Dunkirk.

Personal information
- Full name: Martin Elmiger
- Born: 23 September 1978 (age 48) Hagendorn, Switzerland
- Height: 1.81 m (5 ft 11 in)
- Weight: 72 kg (159 lb)

Cycling career
- Sport: Cycling
- Current team: Retired
- Discipline: Road
- Role: Rider
- Rider type: All-rounder

Amateur teams
- 1992–1996: RMV Cham–Hagendorn
- 1997: Cilo–Ciclolinea–Columbus
- 1998: GS Bianchi–Girostar
- 1999–2000: GS Seat–Kona–Radio Argovia
- 2000: Saeco (stagiaire)

Professional teams
- 2001: Post Swiss Team
- 2002–2006: Phonak
- 2007–2012: AG2R Prévoyance
- 2013–2016: IAM Cycling
- 2017: BMC Racing Team

Major wins
- Stage races Tour Down Under (2007) Four Days of Dunkirk (2010) One-day races and Classics National Road Race Championships (2001, 2005, 2010, 2014)

Martin Elmiger (born 23 September 1978) is a Swiss former road racing cyclist, who rode professionally between 2001 and 2017 for the Post Swiss Team, Phonak, Ag2r–La Mondiale, IAM Cycling and BMC Racing Team squads. During his career, Elmiger was a four-time winner of the Swiss National Road Race Championships.

== Career ==
=== Early career ===
Born in Hagendorn, Elmiger's sporting career began with RMV Cham-Hagendorn.

=== AG2R Prévoyance (2007–12) ===
One of the best moments in Elmiger's career was leading the 2007 Tour Down Under for 2 stages and then winning it by a mere 3 seconds over Australian Karl Menzies. He started the UCI ProTour strongly with a 19th place in E3 Prijs Vlaanderen, 17th in Gent–Wevelgem and 24th in Paris–Roubaix after crashing. On stage 2 of the Tour de Romandie, Elmiger finished 5th behind stage winner Robbie McEwen in the wake of a massive pileup involving several riders at high speed. Elmiger started the Tour de Suisse strongly with a 7th place in the prologue, finishing 10.82 seconds behind Fabian Cancellara and in front of riders like Andreas Klöden and Michael Rogers.

=== IAM Cycling (2013–16) ===
Elmiger left Ag2r–La Mondiale at the end of the 2012 season, and joined the new IAM Cycling team for the 2013 season.

On the fifteenth stage of the 2014 Tour de France, Elmiger broke away with Jack Bauer for 222 kilometres (138 miles), only to be caught by the charging peloton a few metres from the line.

== Major results ==
2000
1st Stausee-Rundfahrt Klingnau
6th Rund um den Henninger Turm U23
2001
1st Road race, National Road Championships
3rd Stausee-Rundfahrt Klingnau
8th Tour du Lac Léman
2002
1st Circuito de Getxo
4th GP Ouest–France
4th Boucles de l'Aulne
4th Stausee-Rundfahrt Klingnau
2003
1st Grand Prix of Aargau Canton
2nd Circuito de Getxo
2nd Gran Premio Bruno Beghelli
2nd Stausee-Rundfahrt Klingnau
7th Coppa Sabatini
8th Giro del Lazio
2004
1st Stage 3 Tour du Languedoc-Roussillon
2nd Grand Prix Pino Cerami
2nd Paris–Bourges
3rd Grand Prix of Aargau Canton
2005
National Road Championships

1st Road race
2nd Time trial

1st Stage 1 (TTT) Volta a Catalunya
6th HEW Cyclassics
7th Tour de Berne
8th Giro di Lombardia
10th Road race, UCI Road World Championships
2006
2nd Trofeo Mallorca
5th Trofeo Magaluf-Palmanova
9th Milan–San Remo
2007
1st Overall Tour Down Under
1st Grand Prix d'Isbergues
3rd Grand Prix de la Somme
8th Gran Premio di Chiasso
9th Giro della Romagna
10th Road race, UCI Road World Championships
2008
2nd Road race, National Road Championships
2nd Grand Prix of Aargau Canton
3rd Overall Tour de Picardie

1st Stage 2

7th Dwars door Vlaanderen
2009
3rd Monte Paschi Strade Bianche
4th Overall Tour Down Under
5th Overall Circuit de Lorraine
8th Tour de Vendée
9th Tour of Flanders
2010
National Road Championships

1st Road race
3rd Time trial

1st Overall Four Days of Dunkirk

1st Stage 4

1st Grand Prix de la Somme
3rd Overall Tour du Poitou-Charentes
2011
5th Overall Tour du Poitou-Charentes
2012
3rd Time trial, National Road Championships
10th Overall Four Days of Dunkirk
10th Overall Tour de Luxembourg
10th Grand Prix of Aargau Canton
2013
1st Overall Tour du Limousin

1st Stage 1

National Road Championships

2nd Road race
2nd Time trial

2nd Overall Tour of Britain

1st Points classification

8th Overall Four Days of Dunkirk
9th Overall Bayern–Rundfahrt
2014
1st Road race, National Road Championships
6th Overall Tour du Poitou-Charentes
7th Overall Arctic Race of Norway
Combativity award Stages 7 & 15 Tour de France
2015
5th Overall Tour of Belgium
5th Paris–Roubaix
10th Tour of Flanders
2016
1st Best Swiss rider classification Tour de Suisse
4th Overall Arctic Race of Norway

=== Grand Tour general classification results timeline ===
Grand Tour	2004	2005	2006	2007	2008	2009	2010	2011	2012	2013	2014	2015	2016
Giro d'Italia	—	—	80	—	—	—	—	—	—	—	—	—	—
Tour de France	108	—	—	74	71	—	75	—	—	—	75	100	64
Vuelta a España	—	86	—	—	—	—	—	—	—	—	—	—	—

Legend
—	Did not compete
DNF	Did not finish
