= Alain van Katwijk =

Dutch cyclist

Personal information
- Born: 28 February 1979 (age 47) Bladel, Netherlands

Cycling career
- Sport: Cycling
- Current team: Retired
- Discipline: Road
- Role: Rider

Professional teams
- 2004: BankGiroLoterij
- 2005: Shimano
- 2006: Procomm - Van Hemert
- 2007: Van Vliet

Alain van Katwijk (born 28 February 1979) is a Dutch former cyclist. His father Jan, as well as his uncles Piet and Fons, were also professional cyclists.

== Palmares ==
2003
1st Ronde van Overijssel
1st Omloop der Kempen
3rd Omloop van het Houtland
2004
1st Mountains classification Tour of Belgium
2nd stage 2 Tour Down Under
3rd stage 4 Ster Elektrotoer
2005
9th Paris–Brussels
5th stage 5 Tour of Belgium
2006
2nd Omloop der Kempen
3rd Beverbeek Classic
2007
7th Overall Olympia's Tour

3rd stage 2
