= CSC Team O'Grady =

CSC Team O'Grady is a junior cycling development team set up by Australian Olympic champion Stuart O'Grady along with his personal coach Leigh Bryan, manager Max Stevens and Martin Winter. Team O'Grady had a number of top results in its first year, with 12 National title medals including a national title with Jack Bobridge and Christos Winter.

Team O'Grady are supported by the following sponsors:

- CSC
- Giant.
- Shimano
- Polar
- Standish Cycles Unley
- Unley Nissan
- Skins
- Rudy Project
- Continental
- Limar
- Malaysia Airlines
- Australian Institute of Sport
- South Australian Sports Institute
- ESP

Team O'Grady main site
