= William Walker (cyclist) =

Australian cyclist

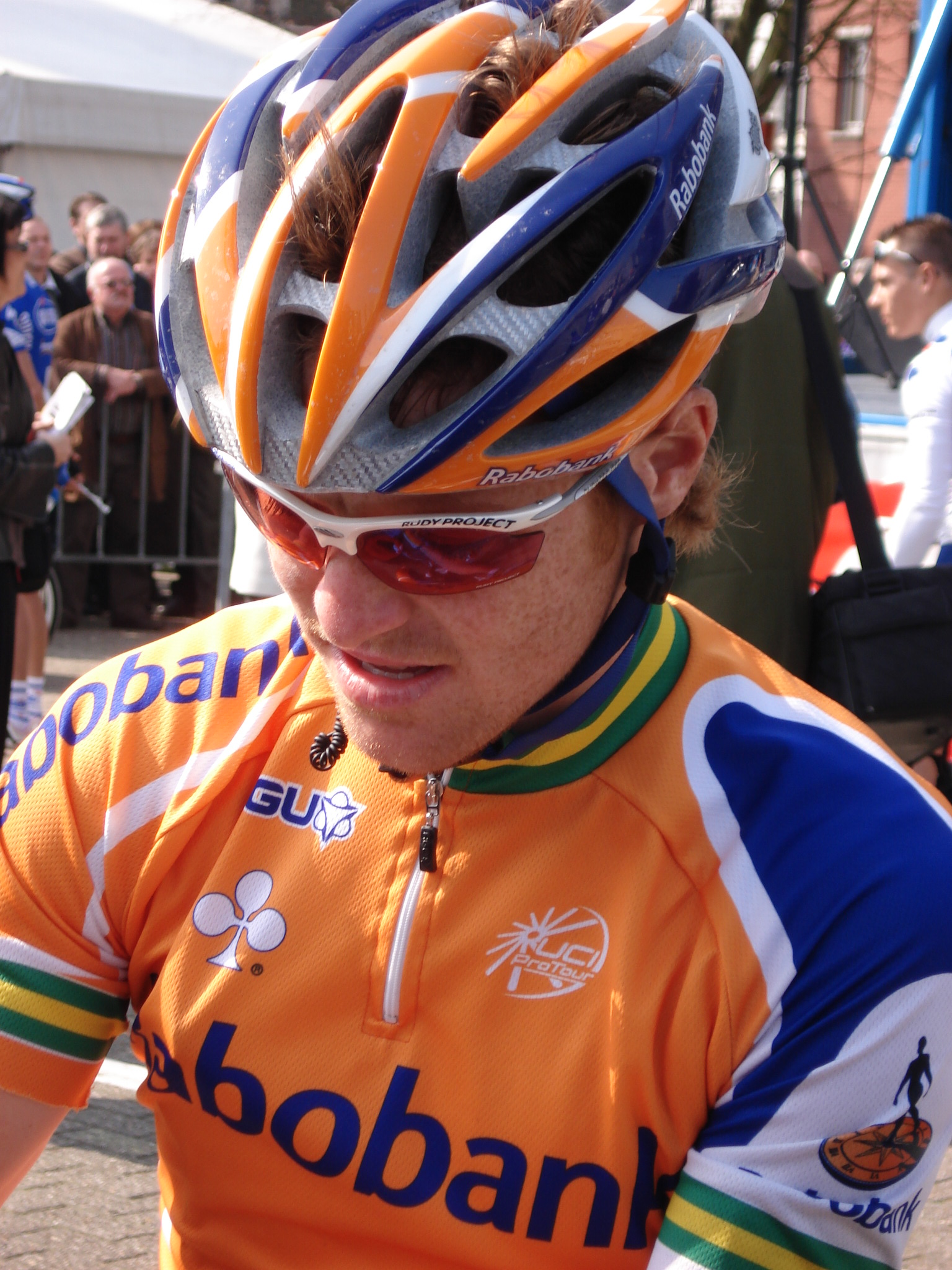

Personal information
- Full name: William Walker
- Born: 31 October 1985 (age 40) Subiaco, Western Australia, Australia
- Height: 1.70 m (5 ft 7 in)
- Weight: 60 kg (130 lb)

Cycling career
- Sport: Cycling
- Discipline: Road
- Role: Rider

Professional teams
- 2005–2008: Rabobank
- 2009: Fuji–Servetto
- 2012–2013: Drapac Cycling
- 2014: Synergy Baku Cycling Project

Major wins
- Elite National Road Race Championships (2006) Under-23 National Road Race Championships (2006)
Medal record
Representing Australia
Men's road bicycle racing
World Championships
Silver medal – second place	2005 Madrid	U-23 Men's Road Race Silver Medal U-23 Men's Road Race 2005 UCI Road World Championships

William Walker (born 31 October 1985 in Subiaco, Western Australia) is a retired Australian professional road racing cyclist and Australian Champion who rode for the Dutch team Rabobank between 2005 and 2008 and Spanish team Fuji–Servetto in 2009. Walker was described as having a motor on par with Lance Armstrong, with a reported recorded VO_{2} max 94. Walker was also heralded as Australia's next Cadel Evans.

Walker finished second to Dmytro Grabovskyy in the Under 23 World Road Championship in Madrid in 2005. In 2006 he famously crossed the line first in the 2006 Australian Road championships and was awarded the gold medal in both the Elite and Under 23 categories, being the first Under 23 rider in history to race in the Australian champion jersey.

Walker represented Australia in the 2003, 2005, 2007 and 2008 World Road Championships as well as the 2006 Commonwealth Games in Melbourne. He also raced for Rabobank in the 2006 Vuelta España and the 2007 Giro d'Italia.

Walker did not ride for Fuji-Servetto in 2010 due to health issues. He returned to racing in 2012, making a successful return winning the 2012 Tour of Gippsland for Drapac Pro Cycling. Walker moved to the Azerbaijan-based Synergy Baku Cycling Project for the 2014 season. Walker was riding in the Australian National Road Race Championships in January 2014 when he suffered from sustained ventricular tachycardia and he retired from the race and from professional cycling.

== Major results ==
2003
1st Stage 4 Bay Classic Series
1st Overall Giro di Basilicata

1st Stage 1

5th Time trial, UCI Junior World Road Championships
2004
1st Overall Tattersalls Cup
1st Road race, Victorian Road Championships
1st Overall Tour of Sunraysia
1st Melbourne–Warrnambool
1st Stage 13 Herald Sun Tour
National Under-23 Road Championships

2nd Road race
3rd Time trial

10th Overall Thüringen Rundfahrt der U23
2005
1st Stage 2 Circuito Montañés
2nd Road race, UCI Under-23 World Road Championships
2nd Road race, National Under-23 Road Championships
2nd Overall UCI Oceania Tour
5th Overall Thüringen Rundfahrt der U23
7th Overall Tour de l'Avenir
2006
1st Road race, National Road Championships
1st Road race, National Under-23 Road Championships
1st Young rider Classification Tour Down Under
2nd Overall Thüringen Rundfahrt der U23
4th Overall Tour Down Under
4th Overall Volta ao Distrito de Santarem
2007
Sachsen Tour

1st Mountains classification
1st Points classification

2008
10th Overall Herald Sun Tour
2009
1st Stage 3 Geelong Bay Classic Series
2012
1st Overall Tour of Gippsland
1st Stage 6 Tour of Tasmania
2013
1st Victorian Road Championship
1st Stage 1 Tour of Toowoomba
2nd Overall Tour of Thailand
3rd Overall New Zealand Cycle Classic
4th Tour de Okinawa
5th Overall Tour of Hainan
