= 2005 Tour Down Under =

Australian cycling race

Race details
- Dates: 18—23 January 2005
- Stages: 6
- Winning time: 16h 45' 44"

Results
Jersey awarded to the overall winner	Winner	Luis León Sánchez (ESP)	(Liberty Seguros–Würth)
	Second	Allan Davis (AUS)	(Liberty Seguros–Würth)
	Third	Stuart O'Grady (AUS)	(Cofidis)
Jersey awarded to the points classification winner	Points	Robbie McEwen (AUS)	(Davitamon–Lotto)
Jersey awarded to the mountains classification winner	Mountains	Gene Bates (AUS)	(UniSA–Australia)
Jersey awarded to the young rider classification winner	Young rider	Luis León Sánchez (ESP)	(Liberty Seguros–Würth)
	Team	Liberty Seguros–Würth	

The 2005 Tour Down Under was the seventh edition of the Tour Down Under stage race. It took place from 18 January to 23 January in and around Adelaide, South Australia. This particular edition was won by Spanish rider Luis León Sánchez, who rode for Liberty Seguros–Würth.

== Stages ==
=== Stage 1 ===
18 January 2005 – Adelaide – Adelaide, 50 km

Stage and General Classification after Stage 1

	Cyclist	Team	Time
1	Robbie McEwen (AUS)	Davitamon–Lotto	1h 00' 45"
2	Allan Davis (AUS)	Liberty Seguros–Würth	s.t.
3	Stuart O'Grady (AUS)	Cofidis	s.t.
4	Baden Cooke (AUS)	Française des Jeux	s.t.
5	Guillermo Ruben Bongiorno (ARG)		s.t.
6	Samuel Dumoulin (FRA)	AG2R Prévoyance	s.t.
7	Aaron Kemps (AUS)	Liberty Seguros–Würth	s.t.
8	Giosuè Bonomi (ITA)	Lampre–Caffita	s.t.
9	Dimitri De Fauw (BEL)	Quick-Step–Innergetic	s.t.
10	Gene Bates (AUS)	Team UniSA–Australia	s.t.

=== Stage 2 ===
19 January 2005 – Salisbury to Tanunda, 150 km

Stage 2 result

	Cyclist	Team	Time
1	Robbie McEwen (AUS)	Davitamon–Lotto	3h 43' 28"
2	Paride Grillo (ITA)	Ceramica Panaria–Navigare	s.t.
3	Allan Davis (AUS)	Liberty Seguros–Würth	s.t.
4	Stuart O'Grady (AUS)	Cofidis	s.t.
5	Erki Pütsep (EST)	AG2R Prévoyance	s.t.
6	Mark Renshaw (AUS)	Française des Jeux	s.t.
7	Samuele Marzoli (ITA)	Lampre–Caffita	s.t.
8	Hilton Clarke (AUS)	UnitedHealthCare	s.t.
9	Giosuè Bonomi (ITA)	Lampre–Caffita	s.t.
10	Matthew Rex (AUS)	Team UniSA–Australia	s.t.

=== Stage 3 ===
20 January 2005 – Glenelg to Victor Harbor, 139 km

Stage 3 result

	Cyclist	Team	Time
1	Luis León Sánchez (ESP)	Liberty Seguros–Würth	3h 19' 39"
2	Johan Vansummeren (BEL)	Davitamon–Lotto	s.t.
3	Gene Bates (AUS)	Team UniSA–Australia	+ 16"
4	Robert McLachlan (AUS)	Team UniSA–Australia	s.t.
5	Javier Ramirez Abeja (ESP)	Liberty Seguros–Würth	s.t.
6	Allan Davis (AUS)	Liberty Seguros–Würth	+ 18"
7	Paride Grillo (ITA)	Ceramica Panaria–Navigare	s.t.
8	Mark Renshaw (AUS)	Française des Jeux	s.t.
9	Stuart O'Grady (AUS)	Cofidis	s.t.
10	Simon Gerrans (AUS)	AG2R Prévoyance	s.t.

=== Stage 4 ===
21 January 2005 – Unley to Hahndorf, 152 km

Stage 4 result

	Cyclist	Team	Time
1	Matthew White (AUS)	Cofidis	3h 35' 00"
2	Robbie McEwen (AUS)	Davitamon–Lotto	s.t.
3	Sébastien Joly (FRA)	Crédit Agricole	+ 2"
4	Frederic Finot (FRA)	Française des Jeux	s.t.
5	Fortunato Baliani (ITA)	Ceramica Panaria–Navigare	+ 6"
6	Nicolas Portal (FRA)	AG2R Prévoyance	+ 10"
7	Mark Renshaw (AUS)	Française des Jeux	+ 3' 42"
8	Jimmy Engoulvent (FRA)	Cofidis	s.t.
9	David Loosli (SUI)	Lampre–Caffita	s.t.
10	Stuart O'Grady (AUS)	Cofidis	s.t.

=== Stage 5 ===
22 January 2005 – Willunga to Willunga, 147 km

Stage 5 result

	Cyclist	Team	Time
1	Alberto Contador (ESP)	Liberty Seguros–Würth	1h 45' 29"
2	Luis León Sánchez (ESP)	Liberty Seguros–Würth	s.t.
3	Allan Davis (AUS)	Liberty Seguros–Würth	+ 22"
4	Stuart O'Grady (AUS)	Cofidis	+ 25"
5	Javier Ramirez Abeja (ESP)	Liberty Seguros–Würth	s.t.
6	Simon Gerrans (AUS)	AG2R Prévoyance	+ 36"
7	Cadel Evans (AUS)	Davitamon–Lotto	+ 42"
8	Johan Vansummeren (BEL)	Davitamon–Lotto	s.t.
9	Mark Renshaw (AUS)	Française des Jeux	+ 50"
10	Mario Aerts (BEL)	Davitamon–Lotto	s.t.

=== Stage 6 ===
23 January 2005 – Adelaide to Adelaide, 81 km

Stage 6 result

	Cyclist	Team	Time
1	Robbie McEwen (AUS)	Liberty Seguros–Würth	3h 17' 51"
2	Paride Grillo (ITA)	Ceramica Panaria–Navigare	s.t.
3	Allan Davis (AUS)	Liberty Seguros–Würth	s.t.
4	Guillermo Bongiorno (ARG)		s.t.
5	Stuart O'Grady (AUS)	Cofidis	s.t.
6	Erki Pütsep (EST)	AG2R Prévoyance	s.t.
7	Baden Cooke (AUS)	Française des Jeux	s.t.
8	Giosuè Bonomi (ITA)	Lampre–Caffita	s.t.
9	Graeme Brown (AUS)	Ceramica Panaria–Navigare	s.t.
10	Sébastien Hinault (FRA)	Crédit Agricole	s.t.

== Final standings ==
=== General classification ===
	Cyclist	Team	Time
1	Luis León Sánchez (ESP)	Liberty Seguros–Würth	16h 45' 44"
2	Allan Davis (AUS)	Liberty Seguros–Würth	+ 33"
3	Stuart O'Grady (AUS)	Cofidis	+ 47"
4	Johan Vansummeren (BEL)	Davitamon–Lotto	+ 48"
5	Javier Ramírez (ESP)	Liberty Seguros–Würth	+ 50"
6	David McPartland (AUS)	Team UniSA–Australia	+ 53"
7	Simon Gerrans (AUS)	AG2R Prévoyance	+ 1' 04"
8	Paride Grillo (ITA)	Ceramica Panaria–Navigare	+ 1' 10"
9	Mark Renshaw (AUS)	Française des Jeux	+ 1' 18"
10	Robert McLachlan (AUS)	Team UniSA–Australia	s.t.

=== Points Classification ===
	Rider	Team	Points
1	Robbie McEwen (AUS)	Davitamon–Lotto	54
2	Paride Grillo (ITA)	Ceramica Panaria–Navigare	32
3	Allan Davis (AUS)	Liberty Seguros–Würth	32
4	Gene Bates (AUS)	Team UniSA–Australia	16
5	Luis León Sánchez (ESP)	Liberty Seguros–Würth	14
6	Matt White (AUS)	Cofidis	12
7	Stuart O'Grady (AUS)	Cofidis	12
8	Mickaël Delage (FRA)	Française des Jeux	10
9	Alberto Contador (ESP)	Liberty Seguros–Würth	8
10	Johan Vansummeren (BEL)	Davitamon–Lotto	6

=== King of the Mountains classification ===
	Rider	Team	Points
1	Gene Bates (AUS)	Team UniSA–Australia	52
2	David O'Loughlin (IRL)	Navigators	40
3	Fortunato Baliani (ITA)	Ceramica Panaria–Navigare	24
4	Alberto Contador (ESP)	Liberty Seguros–Würth	22
5	Mickaël Delage (FRA)	Française des Jeux	20
6	Nicolas Portal (FRA)	AG2R Prévoyance	16
7	Johan Vansummeren (BEL)	Davitamon–Lotto	12
8	Sergio Paulinho (POR)	Liberty Seguros–Würth	12
9	David McKenzie (AUS)	United Water	10
10	László Bodrogi (HUN)	Crédit Agricole	10

=== Young Riders' classification ===
	Rider	Team	Time
1	Luis León Sánchez (ESP)	Liberty Seguros–Würth	14h 45′ 44"
2	Aaron Kemps (AUS)	Liberty Seguros–Würth	+ 2′ 07"
3	Mickaël Delage (FRA)	Française des Jeux	+ 33′ 46"
4	Arnaud Gérard (FRA)	Française des Jeux	+ 34′ 35"
5	Christopher Sutton (AUS)	United Water	+ 38′ 49"
