= Patrick Jonker =

Australian cyclist (born 1969)

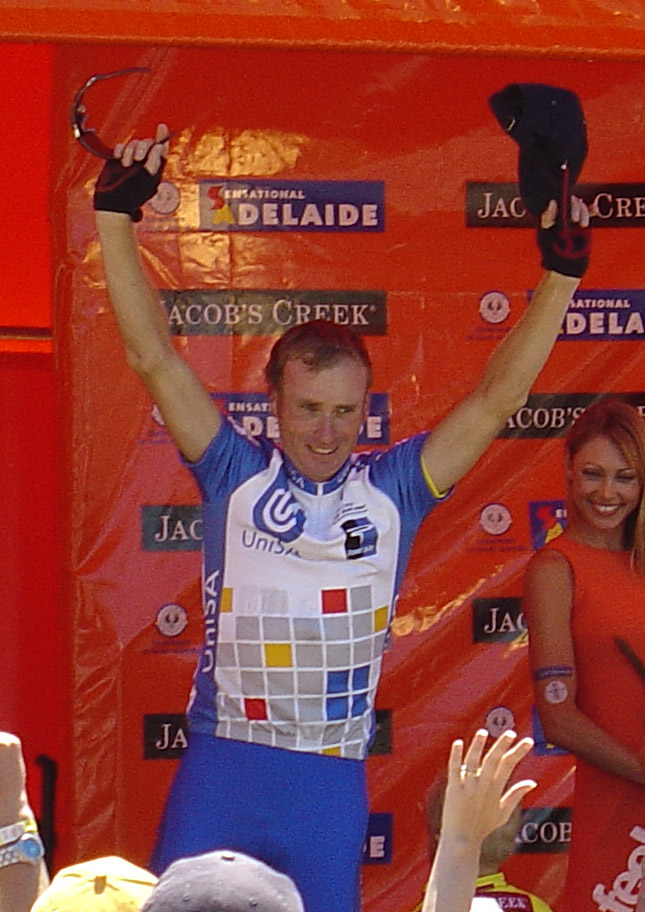
- 2004 Tour Down Under winner Jonker celebrates

Personal information
- Full name: Patrick Jonker
- Born: 25 May 1969 (age 57) Amsterdam, Netherlands
- Height: 1.84 m (6 ft 1/2 in)
- Weight: 69 kg (152 lb; 10 st 12 lb)

Cycling career
- Sport: Cycling
- Current team: Retired
- Discipline: Road
- Role: Rider

Professional teams
- 1992: Varta–Elk–Nö (stagiaire)
- 1993–1994: Novemail–Histor–Laser Computer
- 1995–1996: ONCE
- 1997–1999: Rabobank
- 2000: U.S. Postal Service
- 2001–2002: BigMat–Auber 93
- 2003: Van Hemert Groep Cycling
- 2004: UniSA–Australia

Major wins
- Tour Down Under (2004); Route du Sud (1997)

Patrick Jonker (born 25 May 1969) is an Australian retired road bicycle racer from Dutch and German ancestry. He was a professional rider from 1993 to 2004. Jonker represented Australia twice at the Summer Olympics, in 1992 and 1996. He was an Australian Institute of Sport scholarship holder. The highlights of his career include wins in the 1997 Route du Sud, the 1999 Grand Prix de Wallonie and ending his career with a high profile victory in the 2004 Tour Down Under. In 2012, he denied any involvement in doping practices at U.S. Postal Service during his stint in the team in the 2000 season following the Lance Armstrong doping affair. He stated that the seven titles in the Tour de France that Armstrong won should be voided since the doping tests were unreliable at that time in his opinion.

== Major results ==
1991
3rd Overall GP Tell
1992
Barcelona Olympic Games Road Race
1993
1st Stage 5 Milk Race
3rd Overall Teleflex Tour
8th Overall Tour of Sweden
1994
4th Overall Route du Sud
5th Road race, Dutch National Road Championships
6th Overall Grand Prix du Midi Libre
8th Overall Critérium du Dauphiné Libéré
1995
2nd Overall Circuit de la Sarthe
3rd Dutch Food Valley Classic
1996
2nd Overall Volta a Catalunya

1st Stage 4

5th Classique des Alpes
8th Time trial, Summer Olympics
9th Overall Grand Prix du Midi Libre
1997
1st Overall Route du Sud
2nd Overall Regio-Tour
4th Tour du Haut Var
1998
1st Road race, Dutch National Road Championships
4th Overall Tour Méditerranéen
9th Overall Critérium du Dauphiné Libéré
10th Overall Euskal Bizikleta
1999
1st Grand Prix de Wallonie
2nd Overall Route du Sud
4th Road race, Dutch National Road Championships
6th Overall Tour of Britain
8th Overall Tour Méditerranéen
10th Brabantse Pijl
2001
2nd Overall Tour du Limousin
3rd GP Ouest-France
4th Grand Prix d'Isbergues
5th Overall Tour Méditerranéen
7th Overall Tour Down Under
8th Overall Tour de l'Ain
2002
3rd Overall Tour Down Under
10th GP Villafranca de Ordizia
2003
3rd Road race, Australian National Road Championships
7th Overall Tour Down Under
2004
1st Overall Tour Down Under

=== Grand Tour general classification results timeline ===
Grand Tour	1994	1995	1996	1997	1998	1999
Giro d'Italia	—	44	—	—	—	—
Tour de France	DNF	—	12	62	34	97
Vuelta a España	—	—	—	73	—	—
