= 2009 Tour Down Under =

11th edition of the Tour Down Under cycling stage race

2009 UCI World Ranking, race 1 of 24
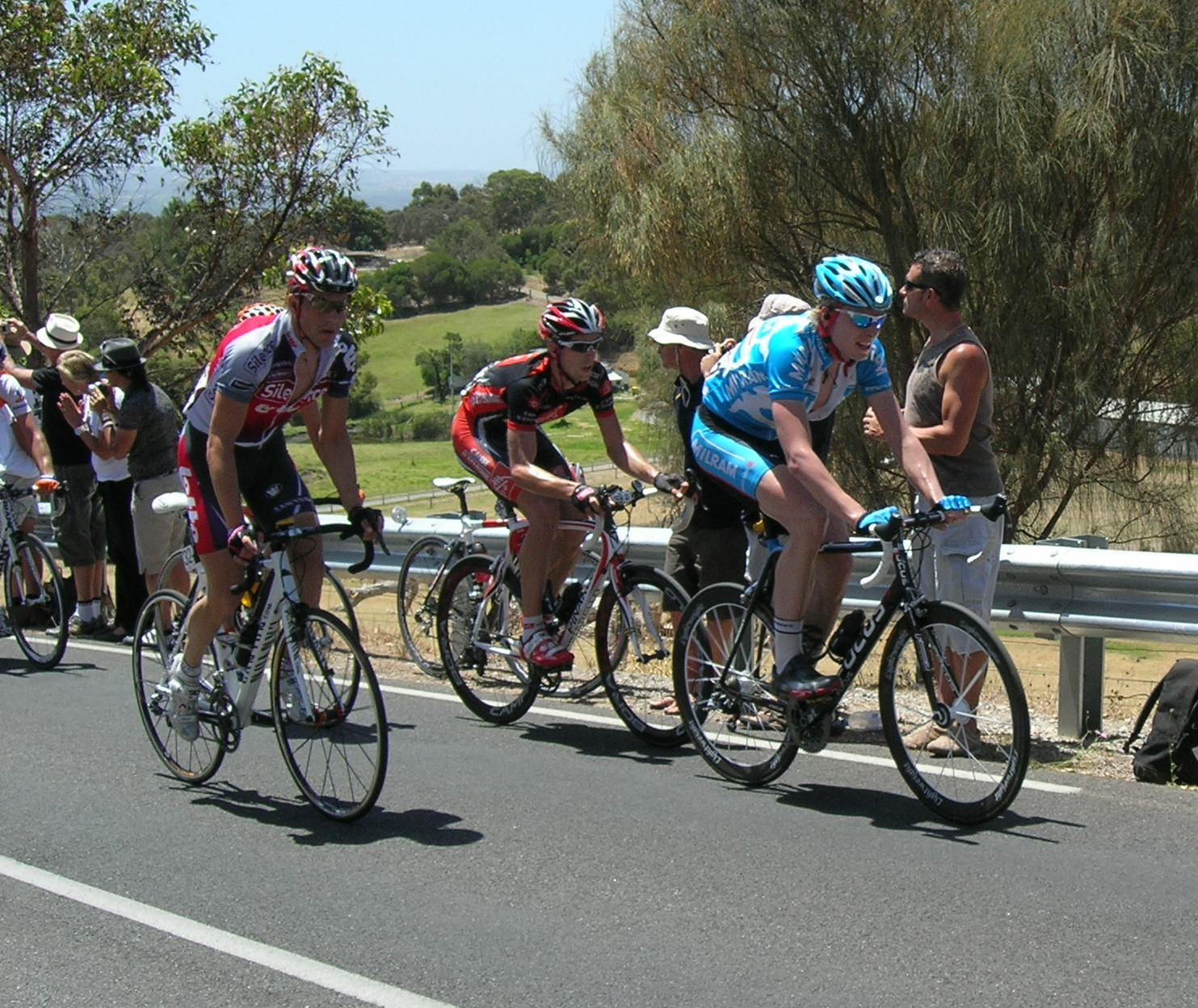
- Glenn D'Hollander, Imanol Erviti and Wim Stroetinga climb Willunga Hill during Stage 5

Race details
- Dates: 20–25 January 2009
- Stages: 6
- Distance: 802 km (498 mi)
- Winning time: 19h 26' 59"

Results
	Winner	Allan Davis (AUS)	(Quick-Step)
	Second	Stuart O'Grady (AUS)	(Team Saxo Bank)
	Third	José Joaquín Rojas (ESP)	(Caisse d'Epargne)
	Points	Allan Davis (AUS)	(Quick-Step)
	Mountains	Andoni Lafuente (ESP)	(Euskaltel–Euskadi)
	Young rider	José Joaquín Rojas (ESP)	(Caisse d'Epargne)
	Team	Française des Jeux	

The 2009 Tour Down Under was the 11th edition of the Tour Down Under cycling stage race, taking place over 20–25 January in and around Adelaide, South Australia. The Tour Down Under was the first race outside Europe to be given ProTour status by the UCI, and this edition was the first race in the inaugural UCI World Ranking calendar.

This was the first race in Lance Armstrong's comeback. The race was preceded by an opening race called Down Under Classic, not part of the UCI ProTour competition.

The race was won by Australian Allan Davis of Quick-Step.

== Stage results ==
=== Stage 1, 20 January, Norwood – Mawson Lakes, 140 km ===
Stage 1 result

	Cyclist	Team	Time
1	André Greipel (GER)	Team Columbia–High Road	3h 45' 27"
2	Baden Cooke (AUS)	UniSA–Australia	s.t.
3	Stuart O'Grady (AUS)	Team Saxo Bank	s.t.

General Classification after Stage 1

	Cyclist	Team	Time
1	André Greipel (GER)	Team Columbia–High Road	3h 45' 16"
2	Baden Cooke (AUS)	UniSA–Australia	+ 5"
3	Olivier Kaisen (BEL)	Silence–Lotto	+ 5"

=== Stage 2, 21 January, Hahndorf – Stirling, 145 km ===
Stage 2 result

	Cyclist	Team	Time
1	Allan Davis (AUS)	Quick-Step	3h 46' 25"
2	Graeme Brown (AUS)	Rabobank	s.t.
3	Martin Elmiger (SUI)	Ag2r–La Mondiale	+ 2"

General Classification after Stage 2

	Cyclist	Team	Time
1	Allan Davis (AUS)	Quick-Step	7h 31' 42"
2	André Greipel (GER)	Team Columbia–High Road	+ 3"
3	Graeme Brown (AUS)	Rabobank	+ 4"

=== Stage 3, 22 January, Unley – Victor Harbor, 136 km ===
Stage 3 result

	Cyclist	Team	Time
1	Graeme Brown (AUS)	Rabobank	3h 15' 35"
2	Allan Davis (AUS)	Quick-Step	s.t.
3	Stuart O'Grady (AUS)	Team Saxo Bank	s.t.

General Classification after Stage 2

	Cyclist	Team	Time
1	Allan Davis (AUS)	Quick-Step	10h 47' 11"
2	Graeme Brown (AUS)	Rabobank	s.t.
3	Stuart O'Grady (AUS)	Team Saxo Bank	+ 5"

=== Stage 4, 23 January, Burnside Village – Angaston, 143 km ===
Stage 4 result

	Cyclist	Team	Time
1	Allan Davis (AUS)	Quick-Step	3h 29' 35"
2	Graeme Brown (AUS)	Rabobank	s.t.
3	José Joaquín Rojas (ESP)	Caisse d'Epargne	s.t.

General Classification after Stage 4

	Cyclist	Team	Time
1	Allan Davis (AUS)	Quick-Step	14h 16' 36"
2	Graeme Brown (AUS)	Rabobank	+ 4"
3	Stuart O'Grady (AUS)	Team Saxo Bank	+ 15"

=== Stage 5, 24 January, Snapper Point – Willunga, 148 km ===
Stage 5 result

	Cyclist	Team	Time
1	Allan Davis (AUS)	Quick-Step	3h 28' 33"
2	José Joaquín Rojas (ESP)	Caisse d'Epargne	s.t.
3	Martin Elmiger (SUI)	Ag2r–La Mondiale	s.t.

General Classification after Stage 5

	Cyclist	Team	Time
1	Allan Davis (AUS)	Quick-Step	19h 26' 59"
2	Stuart O'Grady (AUS)	Team Saxo Bank	+ 25"
3	José Joaquín Rojas (ESP)	Caisse d'Epargne	+ 30"

=== Stage 6, 25 January, Adelaide City Council Circuit, 90 km ===
Stage 6 result

	Cyclist	Team	Time
1	Francesco Chicchi (ITA)	Liquigas	1h 42' 00"
2	Robbie McEwen (AUS)	Team Katusha	s.t.
3	Graeme Brown (AUS)	Rabobank	s.t.

Final General Classification

	Cyclist	Team	Time
1	Allan Davis (AUS)	Quick-Step	19h 26' 59"
2	Stuart O'Grady (AUS)	Team Saxo Bank	+ 25"
3	José Joaquín Rojas (ESP)	Caisse d'Epargne	+ 30"

== Final standing ==
=== General classification ===
	Cyclist	Team	Time
1	Allan Davis (AUS)	Quick-Step	19h 26' 59"
2	Stuart O'Grady (AUS)	Team Saxo Bank	+ 25"
3	José Joaquín Rojas (ESP)	Caisse d'Epargne	+ 30"
4	Martin Elmiger (SUI)	Ag2r–La Mondiale	+ 30"
5	Wesley Sulzberger (AUS)	Française des Jeux	+ 37"
6	Michael Rogers (AUS)	Team Columbia–High Road	+ 38"
7	Matthew Wilson (AUS)	UniSA–Australia	+ 39"
8	Mauro Santambrogio (ITA)	Lampre–NGC	+ 40"
9	Jussi Veikkanen (FIN)	Française des Jeux	+ 40"
10	Mickaël Chérel (FRA)	Française des Jeux	+ 40"

=== Mountains classification ===
	Cyclist	Team	Points
1	Andoni Lafuente (ESP)	Euskaltel–Euskadi	46
2	Markel Irizar (ESP)	Euskaltel–Euskadi	38
3	Olivier Kaisen (BEL)	Silence–Lotto	24

=== Points classification ===
	Cyclist	Team	Points
1	Allan Davis (AUS)	Quick-Step	30
2	Graeme Brown (AUS)	Rabobank	24
3	Andoni Lafuente (ESP)	Euskaltel–Euskadi	20

=== Young classification ===
	Cyclist	Team	Time
1	José Joaquín Rojas (ESP)	Caisse d'Epargne	19h 27' 29"
2	Wesley Sulzberger (AUS)	Française des Jeux	+ 7"
3	Mickaël Chérel (FRA)	Française des Jeux	+ 10"

=== Team classification ===
	Team	Time
1	Française des Jeux	58h 22' 57"
2	Caisse d'Epargne	+ 8"
3	Ag2r–La Mondiale	+ 11"

== Classification leadership ==
Stage (Winner)	General Classification	Mountains Classification	Points Classification	Young Rider Classification	Team Classification	Aggressive Rider
Stage 1 (André Greipel)	André Greipel		Olivier Kaisen	Jacopo Guarnieri	Team Milram	Olivier Kaisen
Stage 2 (Allan Davis)	Allan Davis	Andoni Lafuente	Olivier Kaisen	José Joaquín Rojas	Rabobank	Aaron Kemps
Stage 3 (Graeme Brown)	Allan Davis	Markel Irizar	Stuart O'Grady	José Joaquín Rojas	Team Columbia–High Road	Cameron Meyer
Stage 4 (Allan Davis)	Allan Davis	Andoni Lafuente	Allan Davis	José Joaquín Rojas	Française des Jeux	Vladimir Efimkin
Stage 5 (Allan Davis)	Allan Davis	Andoni Lafuente	Allan Davis	José Joaquín Rojas	Française des Jeux	Jack Bobridge
Stage 6 (Francesco Chicchi)	Allan Davis	Andoni Lafuente	Allan Davis	José Joaquín Rojas	Française des Jeux	Wesley Sulzberger
Final	Allan Davis	Andoni Lafuente	Allan Davis	José Joaquín Rojas	Française des Jeux	

== Individual 2009 UCI World Rankings standings after race ==
Per the first published individual classification.

Rank	Name	Team	Points
1	Allan Davis (AUS)	Quick-Step	122
2	Stuart O'Grady (AUS)	Team Saxo Bank	87
3	José Joaquín Rojas (ESP)	Caisse d'Epargne	77
4	Martin Elmiger (SUI)	Ag2r–La Mondiale	64
5	Wesley Sulzberger (AUS)	Française des Jeux	50
6	Michael Rogers (AUS)	Team Columbia–High Road	40
7	Mauro Santambrogio (ITA)	Lampre–NGC	20
8	Graeme Brown (AUS)	Rabobank	16
9	Jussi Veikkanen (FIN)	Française des Jeux	10
10	Francesco Chicchi (ITA)	Liquigas	6
11	André Greipel (GER)	Team Columbia–High Road	6
12	Robbie McEwen (AUS)	Team Katusha	5
13	Mickaël Chérel (FRA)	Française des Jeux	4
14	George Hincapie (USA)	Team Columbia–High Road	2
15	Luis León Sánchez (ESP)	Caisse d'Epargne	1
16	Jérémy Roy (FRA)	Française des Jeux	1
17	Greg Henderson (NZL)	Team Columbia–High Road	1
18	Jacopo Guarnieri (ITA)	Liquigas	1
19	Mark Renshaw (AUS)	Team Columbia–High Road	1

== Teams ==
Nation	UCI Code	Team Name
	ALM	Ag2r–La Mondiale
	AST	Astana
	BBO	Bbox Bouygues Telecom
	COF	Cofidis
	EUS	Euskaltel–Euskadi
	FDJ	Française des Jeux
	FUJ	Fuji–Servetto
	GCE	Caisse d'Epargne
	GRM	Garmin–Slipstream
	KAT	Team Katusha
	LAM	Lampre–NGC
	LIQ	Liquigas
	MRM	Team Milram
	QST	Quick-Step
	RAB	Rabobank
	SAX	Team Saxo Bank
	SIL	Silence–Lotto
	THR	Team Columbia–High Road

The Australian national team called Team UniSA–Australia was the only non-UCI ProTour team invited to the race.
