= 2006 Tour Down Under =

8th edition of the Tour Down Under stage race

UCI Oceania Tour

Race details
- Dates: 17—22 January 2006
- Stages: 6
- Distance: 685 km (426 mi)
- Winning time: 16h 36' 54"

Results
Jersey awarded to the overall winner	Winner	Simon Gerrans (AUS)	(AG2R Prévoyance)
	Second	Luis León Sánchez (ESP)	(Liberty Seguros–Würth)
	Third	Robbie McEwen (AUS)	(Davitamon–Lotto)
Jersey awarded to the points classification winner	Points	Allan Davis (AUS)	(Liberty Seguros–Würth)
Jersey awarded to the mountains classification winner	Mountains	Cadel Evans (AUS)	(Davitamon–Lotto)
Jersey awarded to the young rider classification winner	Young rider	William Walker (AUS)	(Rabobank)
	Team	UniSA–Australia	

The 2006 Tour Down Under was held from 18 to 22 January 2006 in and around Adelaide, South Australia. The eighth edition of the Tour Down Under was a stage road cycling race that took part over five stages with a total of 685 kilometres (426 mi), and was part of the 2005–06 UCI Oceania Tour. The 2006 Down Under Classic was the official warm-up race for the event.

The race was won by Australian rider Simon Gerrans of AG2R Prévoyance. The event was awarded the Australian Sport Tourism Award of the year at the Australian Sport Awards in February 2006, having attracted 495,000 spectators and more than 11,670 visitors to South Australia.

== Teams ==
- Liberty Seguros-Würth Team
- Credit Agricole
- Ag2r Prevoyance
- Davitamon-Lotto
- Team Milram
- Liquigas-Bianchi
- Bouygues Telecom
- Chocolade Jacques-T Interim
- Navigators Insurance Cycling Team
- South Australia.com-AIS Cycling
- UniSA-Australia
- United Water-Australia U/23

== Stages ==
Stage	Date	Route	Distance	Type	Winner
1	19 January	Mawson Lakes to Angaston	148 km (92 mi)	Hilly stage	Simon Gerrans (AUS)
2	20 January	Stirling to Hahndorf	146 km (91 mi)	Hilly stage	Allan Davis (AUS)
3	21 January	Strathalbyn to Yankalilla	154 km (96 mi)	Hilly stage	Carlos Barredo (ESP)
4	22 January	Willunga to Willunga	147 km (91 mi)	Hilly stage	Russell Van Hout (AUS)
5	23 January	Adelaide	90 km (56 mi)	Flat stage	Allan Davis (AUS)
Total			685 km (426 mi)		

== Men's stage summary ==
Stage	Date	Stage Top 3	Leading Top 3	Time
1	18 January	(Australia) Simon Gerrans (Spain) Luis León Sánchez (Australia) Robbie McEwen	(Australia) Simon Gerrans (Spain) Luis León Sánchez (Australia) Robbie McEwen	3:38.24 + 0.07 + 0.18
2	19 January	(Australia) Allan Davis (Australia) Paul Crake (Spain) Eladio Sanchez Prado	(Australia) Simon Gerrans (Spain) Luis León Sánchez (Australia) Robbie McEwen	7:12.55 + 0.07 + 0.18
3	20 January	(Spain) Carlos Barredo (Germany) Daniel Becke (Australia) Cadel Evans	(Australia) Simon Gerrans (Spain) Luis León Sánchez (Australia) Robbie McEwen	11:11.32 + 0.07 + 0.18
4	21 January	(Australia) Russell Van Hout (Australia) Paul Crake (France) Rony Martias	(Australia) Simon Gerrans (Spain) Luis León Sánchez (Australia) Robbie McEwen	14:47.07 + 0.07 + 0.18
5	22 January	(Australia) Allan Davis (Australia) Robbie McEwen (Italy) Simone Cadamuro	(Australia) Simon Gerrans (Spain) Luis León Sánchez (Australia) Robbie McEwen	16:36.54 + 0.07 + 0.14

== Other leading top threes ==
Stage	Mountains	Pts	Sprint	Pts	Under 23	Pts	Teams	Time
1	(France) Samuel Dumoulin (Australia) Cadel Evans (Australia) Gene Bates	16; 12; 8	(Australia) Simon Gerrans (Australia) Russell Van Hout (Australia) Luis León Sánchez	14; 6; 6	(Australia) William Walker (Australia) Simon Clarke (Italy) Eros Capecchi	3:39.10 + 2.33 + 4.03	UniSA–Australia; Southaustralia.com–AIS; Liberty Seguros-Wurth Team	11:05.08 + 10.37 + 11.54
2	(France) Samuel Dumoulin (Australia) Gene Bates (Australia) Cadel Evans	32; 20; 20	(Australia) Simon Gerrans (Australia) Allan Davis (Australia) Hilton Clarke	14; 12; 12	(Australia) William Walker (Australia) Simon Clarke (Italy) Eros Capecchi	7:13.41 + 2.33 + 4.03	UniSA–Australia; Liberty Seguros-Wurth Team; Southaustralia.com–AIS	21:41.31 + 5.22 + 12.37
3	(Australia) Cadel Evans (France) Samuel Dumoulin (Australia) Gene Bates	36; 32; 20	(Germany) Daniel Becke (Australia) Simon Gerrans (Australia) Allan Davis	18; 14; 12	(Australia) William Walker (Australia) Simon Clarke (Italy) Eros Capecchi	11:12.18 + 2.33 + 4.03	UniSA–Australia; Liberty Seguros-Wurth Team; Southaustralia.com–AIS	33:29.50 + 3.42 + 18.01
4	(Australia) Cadel Evans (France) Samuel Dumoulin (Australia) Russell Van Hout	36; 32; 20	(Australia) Russell Van Hout (Germany) Daniel Becke (Australia) Simon Gerrans	18; 18; 14	(Australia) William Walker (Australia) Simon Clarke (Italy) Eros Capecchi	14:47.53 + 2.33 + 4.03	UniSA–Australia; Liberty Seguros-Wurth Team; Davitamon Lotto	44:11.09 + 7.40 + 23.18
5	(Australia) Cadel Evans (France) Samuel Dumoulin (Italy) Luca Paolini	40; 38; 32	(Australia) Allan Davis (Australia) Russell Van Hout (Germany) Daniel Becke	20; 18; 18	(Australia) William Walker (Australia) Simon Clarke (Italy) Eros Capecchi	16:37.40 + 2.33 + 4.07	UniSA–Australia; Liberty Seguros-Wurth Team; Southaustralia.com–AIS	49:40.44 + 7.26 + 23.27

=== Men's top 10 overall ===
Pos	Rider	Time
1	(Australia) Simon Gerrans	16:36.54
2	(Spain) Luis León Sánchez	+ 0.07
3	(Australia) Robbie McEwen	+ 0.14
4	(Australia) William Walker	+ 0.46
5	(Australia) Gene Bates	+ 1.48
6	(France) Samuel Dumoulin	+ 2.42
7	(Australia) Russell Van Hout	+ 3.00
8	(Australia) Simon Clarke	+ 3.19
9	(Australia) Chris Jongewaard	+ 3.19
10	(Belgium) Glenn d'Hollander	+ 3.31
