= Russell Van Hout =

Australian cyclist

Personal information
- Full name: Russell Van Hout
- Born: 15 June 1976 (age 50) Adelaide, Australia

Cycling career
- Sport: Cycling
- Current team: Retired
- Discipline: Road
- Role: Rider

Professional teams
- 2000–2003: Aguardiente Néctar–Selle Italia
- 2003: Team Maestro–Nella
- 2003: Axa Pro Cycling Team
- 2004–2005: Colombia–Selle Italia
- 2006–2009: Savings & Loans

Russell Van Hout (born 15 June 1976) is an Australian former racing cyclist. He won the Australian national road race title in 2006. He also rode in the 2004 and 2005 Giro d'Italia and won a stage of the 2006 Tour Down Under.

== Major results ==
2001
3rd Time trial, National Road Championships
2002
1st Overall National Road Series
1st Overall Canberra Tour
2nd Overall Tour of Tasmania

1st Stages 1 & 6

2003
1st Prologue Tour of Greece
2004
4th Overall Tour of Queensland
4th Melbourne to Warrnambool Classic
2005
1st Stage 1 (TTT) Herald Sun Tour
3rd Time trial, National Road Championships
2006
National Road Championships

1st Road race
4th Time trial

7th Overall Tour Down Under

1st Stage 4

2010
4th Road race, National Road Championships
