= Allan Davis (cyclist) =

Australian road racing cyclist

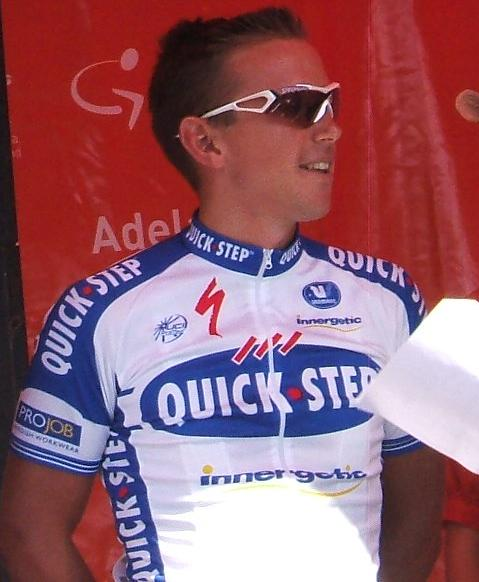
- Davis at the 2009 Tour Down Under

Personal information
- Full name: Allan Davis
- Born: 27 July 1980 (age 46) Ipswich, Queensland, Australia
- Height: 1.72 m (5 ft 8 in)
- Weight: 73 kg (161 lb)

Cycling career
- Sport: Cycling
- Current team: Retired
- Discipline: Road
- Role: Rider
- Rider type: Sprinter

Professional teams
- 2001–2002: Mapei–Quick-Step
- 2003–2006: ONCE–Eroski
- 2007: Discovery Channel
- 2008: Mitsubishi–Jartazi
- 2008–2009: Quick-Step
- 2010–2011: Astana
- 2012–2013: GreenEDGE

Major wins
- Stage races Tour Down Under (2009)
Medal record
Representing Australia
Men's road bicycle racing
Commonwealth Games
Bronze medal – third place	2006 Melbourne	Road Race
Gold medal – first place	2010 New Delhi	Road Race
World Championships
Bronze medal – third place	2010 Melbourne	Elite Men's Road Race

Allan Howard Davis (born 27 July 1980) is an Australian former professional road racing cyclist, who last rode for UCI ProTour team Orica–GreenEDGE. Born in Ipswich, Queensland, Davis resides in Bundaberg, Queensland and in Spain. Known for his sprinting ability, he started competitive cycling at the age of 10, and turned professional in 2002. He is also the brother of fellow cyclist, Scott Davis, and was an Australian Institute of Sport scholarship holder.

== Career ==
In 2004 and 2005 he participated in the Tour de France, coming fifth in the points classification at the 2005 Tour de France behind the winner, Thor Hushovd of Norway, and fellow Australians Stuart O'Grady (2nd) and Robbie McEwen (3rd), and Kazakh champion Alexander Vinokourov (4th).

In 2006, Davis was one of the riders of the Astana–Würth team implicated in the Operación Puerto doping case. However, on 26 July 2006, Davis was cleared by Spanish officials.

He made his debut with Quick Step on 3 September 2008 in the Memorial Rik Van Steenbergen – Aartselaar race after reaching an agreement with Patrick Lefevere for the following two seasons and obtained a definitive free pass from his former team, Mitsubishi–Jartazi.

His 2009 season got off to an excellent start with three stages and the overall of the 2009 Tour Down Under.

Davis moved with brother Scott to Astana for the 2010 season. He remained with the team until the end of 2011, when he moved to the new GreenEDGE team.

Davis won gold in the Road Race in the 2010 Commonwealth Games.

Orica–GreenEDGE opted not to renew Davis' contract for 2014. After attempting to find a new team, Davis announced his retirement from competition in February 2014.

In February 2018 Davis joined Wiggle High5 as the team's lead directeur sportif.

== Major results ==
2000
7th Road race, UCI Road World Under-23 Championships
2001
6th Road race, UCI Road World Under-23 Championships
2002
1st Stage 1 Giro del Capo
2nd GP Istria
3rd Road race, National Under-23 Road Championships
2003
1st Trofeo Manacor
1st Stage 4 Circuit Cycliste de la Sarthe
2nd Road race, National Road Championships
2004
1st Giro del Piemonte
1st Trofeo Alcudia
1st Trofeo Manacor
1st Stage 5 Deutschland Tour
5th Overall Tour de Pologne

1st Stage 3

2005
Vuelta a Murcia

1st Stages 1, 3 & 5

Eneco Tour

1st Points classification
1st Stage 3

Vuelta a Aragón

1st Points classification
1st Stage 5

2nd Overall Tour Down Under
3rd Paris–Tours
3rd HEW Cyclassics
2006
Tour Down Under

1st Stages 2 & 5

3rd Road race, Commonwealth Games
2007
Tour of Qinghai Lake

1st Points classification
1st Stages 1, 3, 5, 6 & 9

1st Stage 3 Volta a Catalunya
2nd Milan–San Remo
2008
2nd Overall Tour Down Under

1st Stage 3

2nd Overall Geelong Bay Classic Series

1st Stage 4

3rd Vattenfall Cyclassics
4th Overall Tour de Pologne

1st Points classification
1st Stage 2

2009
1st Overall Tour Down Under

1st Points classification
1st Stages 2, 4 & 5

2nd Paris–Brussels
2nd Grand Prix de Wallonie
4th Milan–San Remo
4th Vattenfall Cyclassics
2010
1st Road race, Commonwealth Games
1st Points classification Tour de Pologne
3rd Road race, UCI Road World Championships
5th Vattenfall Cyclassics
2011
9th Overall Tour Down Under
10th Cancer Council Helpline Classic
2012
1st Overall Geelong Bay Classic Series
6th Road race, UCI Road World Championships
