= Paul Crake =

Australian cyclist (born 1976)

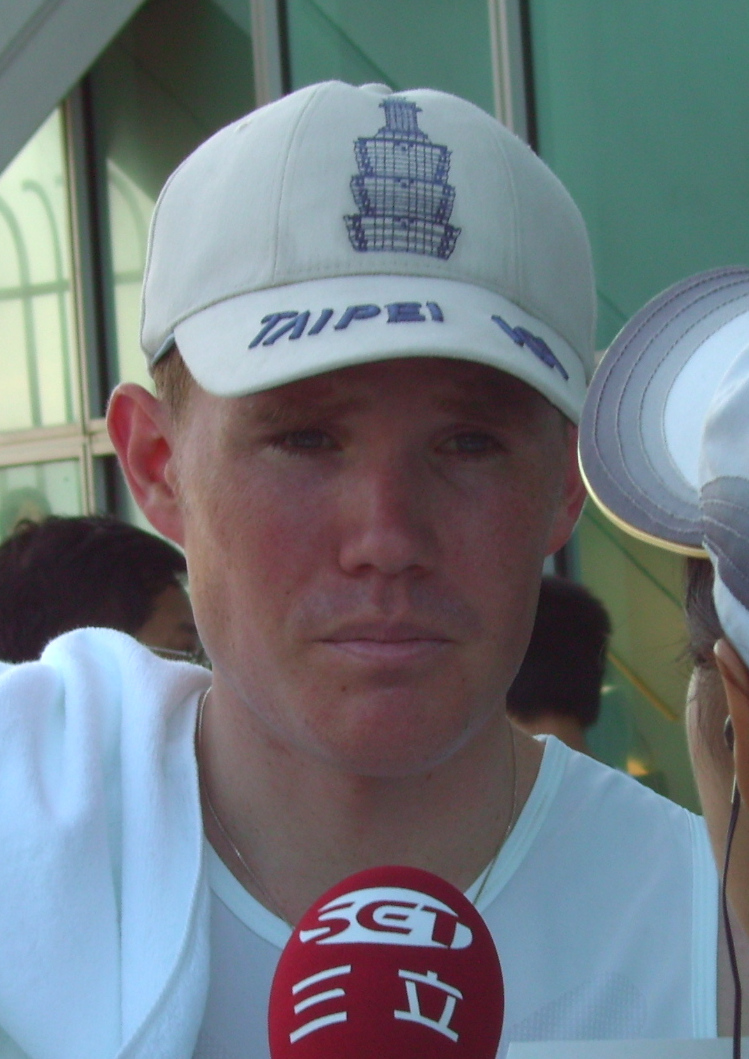
- Paul Crake at 2006 Taipei 101 Run-Up

Personal information
- Full name: Paul Crake
- Born: 6 December 1976 (age 49) Canberra, Australia

Cycling career
- Sport: Cycling
- Discipline: Road
- Role: Rider

Paul Crake (born 6 December 1976 in Canberra) is an Australian professional racing cyclist. Prior to turning to road cycling in 2003, Crake was a successful mountain runner and stairclimbing champion. Crake is a five-time winner of the Empire State Building Run-up, the current record holder in 9 minutes and 33 seconds and the only athlete having run under 10 minutes.

In November 2006, Crake underwent surgery in New Zealand for spinal injuries received in a bicycle crash.

== Major results ==
Running

1998
1st Australian Mountain Running Championships
26th World Mountain Running Championships
1st Sydney Tower Run-up

1999
1st ESB Run-up (10'15")

2000
1st Sydney Tower Run-up
1st ESB Run-up (9'53")

2001
1st Sydney Tower Run-up
1st ESB Run-up (9'37")
17th World Mountain Running Championships

2002
1st Sydney Tower Run-up
1st ESB Run-up (9'40")
1st Australian Mountain Running Championship
16th World Mountain Running Championship

2003
1st ESB Run-up (9'33")
1st Gran Hotel Bali Run up (4´35´´), Europe's tallest hotel.

2005 & 2006
1st Taipei 101 Run up, world's tallest building in 2004-2010, 2nd tallest building in 2010-2012, 3rd tallest building in 2012-2014, 4th tallest building in 2014 & 2015, 5th tallest building in 2015, 6th tallest building in 2015 & 2016, and 7th tallest building in 2016-2020
