= David McPartland =

Australian cyclist

Personal information
- Born: 11 September 1980 (age 46) Albury, Australia

Cycling career
- Sport: Cycling
- Current team: Retired (cyclist); Team Jayco–AlUla (manager)
- Discipline: Road
- Role: Rider

Amateur team
- 2003: Tenax–Garda Calze (stagiaire)

Professional teams
- 2004–2006: Tenax
- 2007: Hadimec

Managerial teams
- 2009–2011: Team Jayco–AIS
- 2012–2013: Orica–AIS
- 2014-: Orica–GreenEDGE

David McPartland (born 11 September 1980) is an Australian former professional road racing cyclist.

== Major results ==
2003
2nd Under-23 National Road Race Championships
2004
1st Stage 2 Tour Down Under
2005
3rd Overall Jayco Bay Classic

1st Stage 3

9th Giro di Romagna
10th GP Industria & Commercio di Prato
2006
6th Overall Tour Down Under
2007
1st Stage 2 Tour Alsace
