= Cédric Hervé =

French cyclist

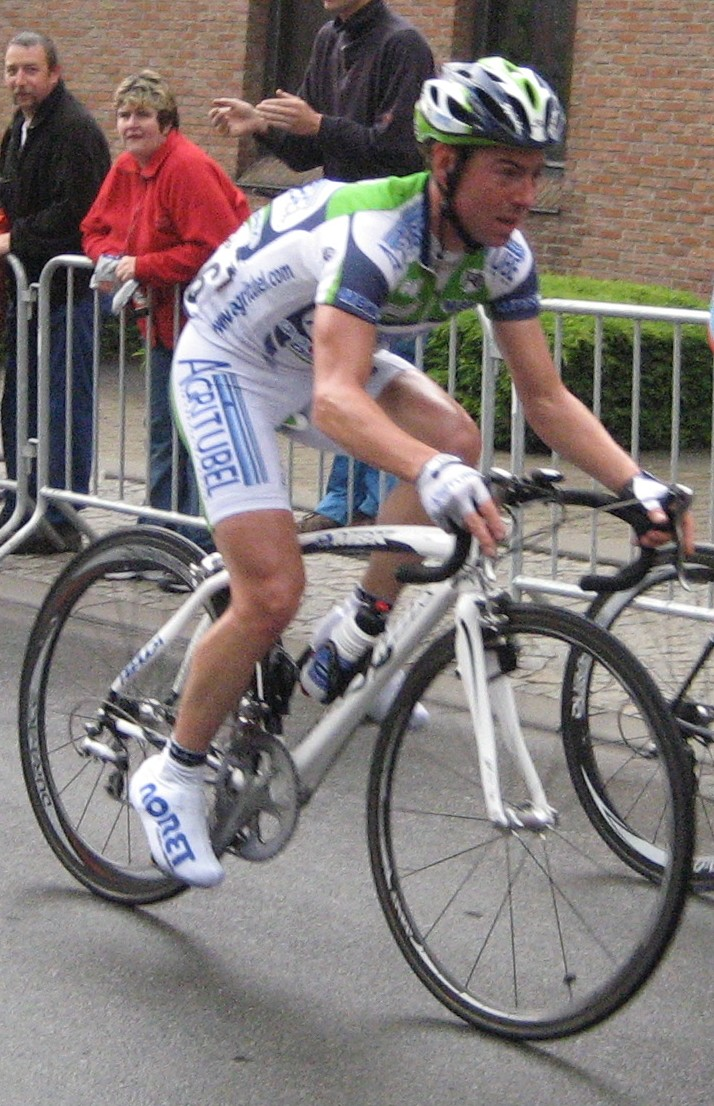

Personal information
- Full name: Cédric Hervé
- Born: 14 November 1979 (age 46) Dinan, France

Cycling career
- Sport: Cycling
- Discipline: Road
- Role: Rider

Amateur teams
- 2000–2001: Jean Floc'h
- 2001: Crédit Agricole (stagiaire)
- 2009: Côtes d'Armor

Professional teams
- 2002–2005: Crédit Agricole
- 2006: Bretagne–Jean Floc'h
- 2007–2008: Agritubel

Cédric Hervé (born 14 November 1979) is a French former road racing cyclist.

Hervé became a professional rider in 2002. His first win came in 2006 when he won the Manche Atlantique. Later that year he would also win the Grand Prix de Plumelec-Morbihan. In 2007 he participated in the Tour de France but withdrew from competition after stage 7.

== Major results ==
2000
1st Overall Kreiz Breizh Elites
2001
1st Stage 5 Ruban Granitier Breton
2004
3rd Châteauroux Classic
2006
1st Val d'Ille Classic
1st Manche-Atlantique
1st Grand Prix de Plumelec-Morbihan
2nd Overall Tour de Picardie
5th Overall Tour du Limousin
7th Boucles de l'Aulne
8th Châteauroux Classic
8th Tour de Vendée
10th Grand Prix d'Isbergues
