= Stuart O'Grady =

Australian cyclist (born 1973)

Stuart O'Grady OAM
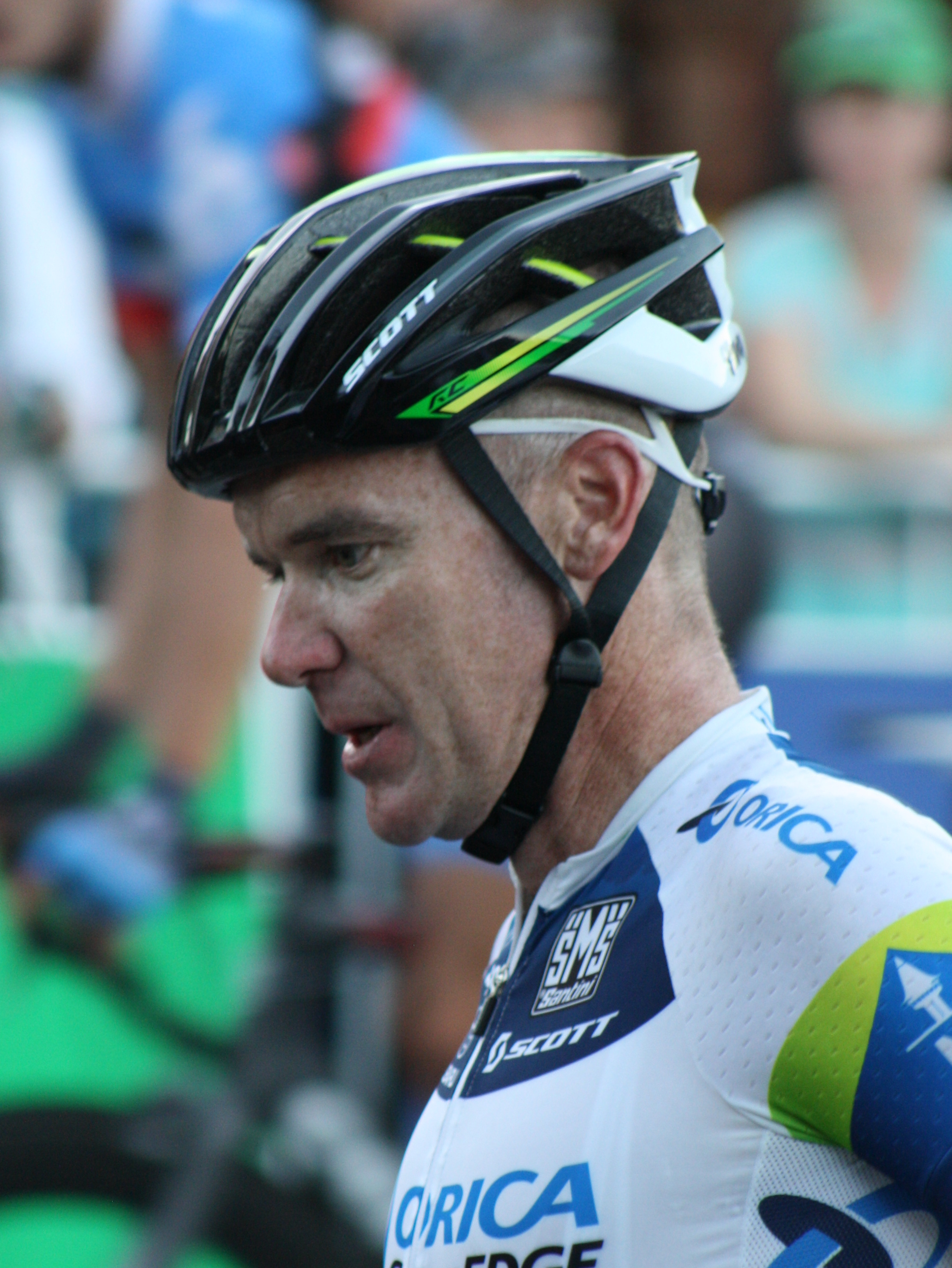
- O'Grady at the 2013 Down Under Classic

Personal information
- Full name: Stuart O'Grady
- Nickname: Stuey
- Born: 6 August 1973 (age 53) Adelaide, Australia
- Height: 1.76 m (5 ft 9 in)
- Weight: 73 kg (161 lb; 11.5 st)

Cycling career
- Sport: Cycling
- Current team: Retired
- Disciplines: Road and track
- Role: Rider
- Rider type: Sprinter/Classics specialist

Professional teams
- 1995–2003: GAN
- 2004–2005: Cofidis
- 2006–2010: Team CSC
- 2011: Leopard Trek
- 2012–2013: GreenEDGE

Major wins
- Grand Tours Tour de France 2 individual stages (1998, 2004) 2 TTT (2001, 2013) Vuelta a España 2 TTT (2006, 2011) Stage races Tour Down Under (1999, 2001) One-day races and Classics National Road Race Championships (2003) HEW Cyclassics (2004) Paris–Roubaix (2007)
Medal record
Representing Australia
Men's track cycling
Olympic Games
Gold medal – first place	2004 Athens	Madison
Silver medal – second place	1992 Barcelona	4000m Team Pursuit
Bronze medal – third place	1996 Atlanta	4000m Team Pursuit
Bronze medal – third place	1996 Atlanta	Points Race
Commonwealth Games
Gold medal – first place	1994 Victoria, BC	Team Pursuit
Gold medal – first place	1994 Victoria, BC	10 Miles Scratch
Gold medal – first place	2002 Manchester	Road Race
Silver medal – second place	1994 Victoria, BC	Points Race
Silver medal – second place	1998 Kuala Lumpur	Individual Time Trial
Bronze medal – third place	1994 Victoria, BC	Individual Pursuit
World Championships
Gold medal – first place	1993 Hamar	Team Pursuit
Gold medal – first place	1995 Bogotá	Team Pursuit
Bronze medal – third place	1991 Stuttgart	Team Pursuit
Bronze medal – third place	1994 Palermo	Team Pursuit
Bronze medal – third place	1995 Bogotá	Individual Pursuit

Stuart Peter O'Grady OAM (born 6 August 1973) is a retired Australian road bicycle racer, who rode as a professional between 1995 and 2013. A former track cyclist, O'Grady and Graeme Brown won a gold medal in the Men's Madison at the 2004 Summer Olympics. O'Grady also won Paris–Roubaix in 2007. O'Grady competed in the Tour de France from 1997 and contended for the points classification in the Tour de France known as the green jersey, finishing second in the 1998, 1999, 2001 and 2005 races. He wore the yellow jersey of general classification leader in 1998 and 2001.

With his participation in the 2013 Tour de France, he tied George Hincapie's record of 17 participations in the Tour de France. However, Hincapie was removed from three of his 17 starts for his part in the Lance Armstrong doping scandal. O'Grady himself admitted having been assisted by illicit erythropoietin (EPO) use at least on the 1998 Tour de France, which was marred by the Festina Affair. O’Grady’s doping at this Tour came to light in 2013 when the French Senate published the results of testing done on samples taken in 1998 using technology that did not exist in the late 90s.(N.B. the Dutchman Joop Zoetemelk holds the absolute records of completed Tours de France, with 16 from 1970 to 1986).

He was awarded the Medal of the Order of Australia (OAM) in the 2005 Australia Day Honours "for service to sport as a Gold Medallist at the Athens 2004 Olympic Games." O'Grady is the current Race Director of the Tour Down Under.

== Early life and amateur career ==
Stuart O'Grady was born in Adelaide and grew up as a part of a cycling family. His father represented South Australia in road and track cycling, and his uncle, Robert Baird, is a former Australian cyclist who competed in the men's team pursuit at the 1964 Summer Olympics.

As a student, he attended St Paul's College. At this time, he started in track cycling and won a silver medal in the 4000m team pursuit at the 1992 Summer Olympics in Barcelona at age 18. In the 1996 Summer Olympics in Atlanta, he won bronze medals in both the points race and team pursuit. He was an Australian Institute of Sport scholarship holder.

== Professional career ==
He joined the GAN professional team, which included English time trial specialist Chris Boardman. This team became known as Crédit Agricole from 1999.

In the 1998 Tour de France, a race for which he confirmed to doping himself with illicit and proscribed erythropoietin, he wore the yellow jersey for three days. He also won his first stage. In 2001 he wore the yellow jersey for six days. He was Australian Cyclist of the Year and Australian Male Road Cyclist of the Year in 1998 and 2001. In 1998 he finished second in the green jersey classification. On 6 July 2000, he pulled out of the Tour de France after breaking his collarbone in three places with 85 kilometres (53 mi) to the finish, he still finished the stage. In 2001, O'Grady had been in contention for the green jersey with Erik Zabel but he was defeated on the final day.

In 2001, he had a narrowing in the iliac artery. Tests showed his right leg produced more power than his left. After surgery in April 2002, he was again in contention in the 2002 Tour de France. In 2003 and 2004 he was overshadowed in the green jersey competition by fellow Australian sprinters Baden Cooke (2003) and Robbie McEwen (2004). O'Grady still managed to win his second Tour de France stage, in 2004.

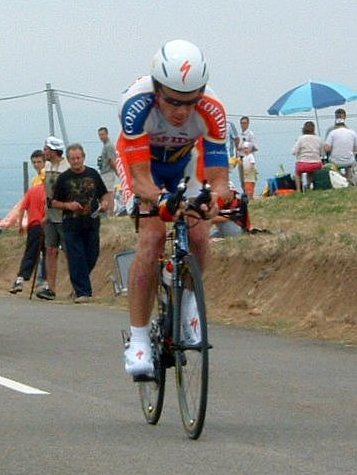
O'Grady at the 2005 Tour de France.

O'Grady moved to Cofidis in 2004 to concentrate on races such as Paris–Roubaix and the Tour of Flanders. After a start fraught with injuries and doping allegations in his team, he won two stages and the points classification in the Critérium du Dauphiné Libéré. He won a stage in the 2004 Tour de France and spent a few days in the green jersey. He won the UCI Road World Cup race, HEW Cyclassics. He topped his victories by winning an Olympic gold medal in the madison cycling with Graeme Brown.

In the 2005 Tour de France, O'Grady came second in the green jersey classification to Thor Hushovd of Norway, followed by Robbie McEwen. Late in 2005, he signed a one-year contract with Bjarne Riis to ride on Team CSC, now known as Saxo Bank, for 2006. He broke several ribs in an early season race in Italy and a vertebra in the Tour de France. O'Grady continued riding the Tour despite the pain, coming third in the final stage.

Early in 2007, O'Grady became the first Australian to win a major classic when he crossed the line first in Paris–Roubaix. He had a puncture midway but recovered to rejoin the field before arriving alone in the Roubaix Velodrome.

On 15 July 2007, O'Grady was forced to abandon on stage 8 of the 2007 Tour de France, from Le-Grand-Bornand to Tignes, after crashing on a descent, fracturing eight ribs, his right shoulder blade, right collar bone and three vertebrae, and puncturing his right lung.

O'Grady crashed 30 kilometres (19 mi) into the 2009 Milan–San Remo when another rider came down in front of him, he punctured his lung and suffered a broken right collar bone once again as well as a broken rib.

On 8 August 2011, O'Grady announced that he had joined the new Australian team GreenEDGE for 2012. He announced his retirement from professional cycling as a competitive rider on 23 July 2013, following the conclusion of the 2013 Tour de France.

=== Doping ===
On 24 July 2013, O'Grady was named in the French Senate report detailing EPO use in the 1998 Tour de France as having returned a sample suspicious for EPO use. He confirmed the same day in an interview with an Australian newspaper that he had taken EPO prior to the 1998 Tour de France, but stated that the arrests around that Tour scared him off doping in the rest of his career.

This announcement has created some controversy amongst cycling fans, as O'Grady had been a vocal critic of the doping culture that existed in the late 1990s and early 2000s. As a result of his doping admission, the Australian Institute of Sport indefinitely suspended O'Grady from its 'Best of the Best'. O'Grady had been inducted in 2006.

== Personal life ==
O'Grady set up and financially supports an Australian junior cycling development team, CSC Team O'Grady, which was established in 2005.

O'Grady is today a member of the 'Champions for Peace' club, a group of 54 famous elite athletes committed to serving peace in the world through sport, created by Peace and Sport, a Monaco-based international organisation.

O'Grady supports the Port Adelaide Power in the Australian Football League.

The Stuart O'Grady Bikeway adjacent to the Northern Expressway in the northern suburbs of Adelaide is named after O'Grady.

O'Grady is the nephew of Robert Baird, who competed in the team pursuit at the 1964 Summer Olympics.

== Major results ==
1992
2nd Team pursuit, Olympic Games
1993
1st Team pursuit, UCI Track World Championships
1994
Commonwealth Games

1st Team pursuit
1st Scratch race
2nd Points race
3rd Individual pursuit

1995
1st Team pursuit, UCI Track World Championships
1996
1st Stage 3 Vuelta a Murcia
Olympic Games

3rd Team pursuit
3rd Points race

1997
Herald Sun Tour

1st Stages 1, 6 & 8

1st Stage 5 Bayern Rundfahrt
1st Points classification Setmana Catalana de Ciclisme
7th Gent–Wevelgem
1998
1st Overall PruTour

1st Stages 2 & 7

Tour de France^{Assisted by illicit erythropoeitin use}

1st Stage 14
Held after Stages 4–6

1st Stage 2 Tour de Luxembourg
1st Stage 5 Tour du Poitou-Charentes
2nd Time trial, Commonwealth Games
2nd GP Haribo
1999
1st Overall Tour Down Under

1st Stages 3 & 5

1st Haribo Classic
1st Stage 5 PruTour
2000
1st Stage 3 GP du Midi-Libre
2001
1st Overall Tour Down Under
1st Gouden Pijl Emmen
Tour de France

1st Stage 5 (TTT)
Held after Stages 3–6 & 8–9

2002
Commonwealth Games

1st Road race

2003
1st Road race, National Road Championships
Tour de Langkawi

1st Stages 6 & 8

1st Centenaire classification Tour de France
3rd Tour of Flanders
3rd Paris–Tours
2004
1st Madison, Olympic Games
Critérium du Dauphiné Libéré

1st Stages 5 & 7

1st HEW Cyclassics
1st Grand Prix de Villers-Cotterêts
1st Stage 5 Tour de France
3rd Overall Danmark Rundt

1st Points classification
1st Stage 1

1st Wiener Radfest
3rd Milan–San Remo
2005
2nd Overall Volta ao Algarve
3rd Overall Tour Down Under
4th Milan–San Remo
6th Rund um Köln
10th Gent–Wevelgem
2006
1st Stage 1 (TTT) Vuelta a España
2nd Overall Tour of Denmark

1st Points classification

2nd Züri-Metzgete
3rd Paris–Tours
2007
1st Paris–Roubaix
3rd Dwars door Vlaanderen
4th Milano–Torino
5th Milan–San Remo
5th Overall Tour of California
5th Omloop Het Volk
9th E3 Prijs Vlaanderen
10th Tour of Flanders
2008
1st Overall Herald Sun Tour

1st Stages 2 & 5

5th Paris–Roubaix
8th Gent–Wevelgem
2009
2nd Overall Tour Down Under
2010
7th Mumbai Cyclothon
10th Overall Tour of Qatar
2011
1st Stage 1 (TTT) Vuelta a España
8th Paris–Tours
9th E3 Prijs Vlaanderen
10th Milan–San Remo
2012
1st Stage 1 (TTT) Tirreno–Adriatico
6th Road race, Olympic Games
2013
1st Stage 4 (TTT) Tour de France

=== Grand Tour general classification results timeline ===
Grand Tour	1997	1998	1999	2000	2001	2002	2003	2004	2005	2006	2007	2008	2009	2010	2011	2012	2013
Giro d'Italia	—	—	—	—	—	—	—	—	DNF	—	—	DNF	—	—	—	—	—
Tour de France	109	54	94	DNF	54	77	90	61	77	89	DNF	106	124	149	78	97	161
// Vuelta a España	—	—	—	—	—	—	—	DNF	—	65	—	—	DNF	DNF	93	—	—

Legend
—	Did not compete
DNF	Did not finish

== See also ==
- List of Australians who have led the Tour de France general classification
- List of athletes with the most appearances at Olympic Games
