= Mexican National Time Trial Championships =

National road cycling championship in Mexico

Mexican National Time Trial Championship decides the national time trial champion of Mexico.

== Multiple winners ==
=== Men ===
| Name | Wins | Years |
|---|---|---|
| Bernardo Colex | 4 | 2011, 2012, 2013, 2014 |
| Eduardo Graciano | 3 | 2000, 2002, 2003 |
| Ignacio Prado | 3 | 2017, 2020, 2021 |
| Camil Siddharta | 2 | 1999, 2001 |
| Juan Pablo Magallanes | 2 | 2007, 2016 |
| Luis Villalobos | 2 | 2018, 2019 |
| Ignacio Sarabia | 2 | 2009, 2022 |

=== Women ===
| Name | Wins | Years |
|---|---|---|
| Giuseppina Grassi | 5 | 1999, 2000, 2006, 2007, 2008 |
| Verónica Leal | 5 | 2009, 2010, 2011, 2014, 2016 |
| Íngrid Drexel | 5 | 2012, 2013, 2015, 2017, 2018 |
| Patricia Palencia | 2 | 2001, 2003 |
| Andrea Ramírez | 2 | 2019, 2020 |

== Men ==
=== Elite ===
| Year | Gold | Silver | Bronze |
| 1999 | Camil Siddharta | Eduardo Uribe | Victor Cruz |
| 2000 | Eduardo Graciano | Camil Siddharta | Florencio Ramos |
| 2001 | Camil Siddharta | Cristian Valenzuela | Domingo González |
| 2002 | Eduardo Graciano | Carlos Hernández | Cristian Valenzuela |
| 2003 | Eduardo Graciano | Jesús Zárate | Domingo González |
| 2004 | | | |
| 2005 | | | |
| 2006 | Fausto Esparza | Cuitlahuac Ayala | Antonio Aldape |
| 2007 | Juan Pablo Magallanes | José Israel García | Cuitlahuac Ayala |
| 2008 | José Manuel García | Juan Pablo Magallanes | Luis Alfredo Gutiérrez |
| 2009 | Ignacio Sarabia | Bernardo Colex | Domingo González |
| 2010 | Raúl Alcalá | Ignacio Sarabia | Carlos López |
| 2011 | Bernardo Colex | Gregorio Ladino | Carlos López |
| 2012 | Bernardo Colex | Juan Enrique Aldapa | Luis Pulido |
| 2013 | Bernardo Colex | Héctor Rangel | Carlos López |
| 2014 | Bernardo Colex | Flavio de Luna | Ignacio Sarabia |
| 2015 | Flavio de Luna | Juan Pablo Magallanes | Héctor Rangel |
| 2016 | Juan Pablo Magallanes | Moises Antonio Aldape | Cristian Valenzuela |
| 2017 | Ignacio Prado | Luis Villalobos | Uri Martins |
| 2018 | Luis Villalobos | Luis Lemus | Ignacio Prado |
| 2019 | Luis Villalobos | Ignacio Prado | Rene Corella |
| 2020 | Ignacio Prado | Ulises Alfredo Castillo | Juan Pablo Magallanes |
| 2021 | Ignacio Prado | Omar Aguilera | Mario Zamora |
| 2022 | Ignacio Sarabia | José Alfredo Santoyo | Ulises Alfredo Castillo |
| 2025 | Isaac Del Toro | Edgar Cadena | Eder Frayre |

=== U23 ===
| Year | Gold | Silver | Bronze |
| 2006 | Omar Cervantes | Abundio Guerrero | Rodolfo Avila |
| 2007 | Omar Cervantes | Rodolfo Avila | Miguel Ángel Hernández |
| 2008 | Rodolfo Avila | Luis Pulido | Luis Zamudio |
| 2009 | Jonathan Islas | Cesar Vaquera | Edgar Morales |
| 2010 | Rodolfo Avila | | |
| 2011 | Uri Martins | Luis Lemus | René Corella |
| 2012 | Juan Enrique Aldapa | Flavio de Luna | Sergio Escutia |
| 2013 | | | |
| 2014 | Ignacio Prado | José Alfredo Santoyo | Efrén Santos |
| 2015 | Ignacio Prado | José Alfredo Santoyo | Fernando Arroyo |
| 2016 | José Alfredo Santoyo | Jhonatan Casillas | Gerardo Medina |
| 2017 | Jhonatan Casillas | Enrique Serrato | Luis Francisco Villa |
| 2018 | | | |
| 2019 | Fernando Islas | Paul González | Gerardo López |
| 2020 | Edgar Cadena | Efrain Xicale | Salvador Lemus |
| 2021 | Jorge Peyrot | Jorge Martínez | Adair Gutiérrez |
| 2022 | Edgar Cadena | Jorge Peyrot | Miguel Arroyo |
| 2025 | José Antonio Prieto | Sebastián Ruiz | Mateo Benjamín Muñoz |

== Women ==
=== Elite ===
| Year | Gold | Silver | Bronze |
| 1999 | Giuseppina Grassi | Sonia Lopez | Emma Sanchez |
| 2000 | Giuseppina Grassi | Gabriela González | Patricia Palencia |
| 2001 | Patricia Palencia | Belem Guerrero | Verónica Leal |
| 2002 | | | |
| 2003 | Patricia Palencia | | |
| 2004 | | | |
| 2005 | | | |
| 2006 | Giuseppina Grassi | Maribel Díaz | Berenice Castro |
| 2007 | Giuseppina Grassi | Rosario Peralta | Maribel Díaz |
| 2008 | Giuseppina Grassi | Verónica Leal | Jessica Jurado |
| 2009 | Verónica Leal | Giuseppina Grassi | Jessica Jurado |
| 2010 | Verónica Leal | Giuseppina Grassi | Sofía Arreola |
| 2011 | Verónica Leal | Giuseppina Grassi | Jenny Rios |
| 2012 | Íngrid Drexel | Ana Teresa Casas | Dulce Pliego |
| 2013 | Íngrid Drexel | Verónica Leal | Ana Teresa Casas |
| 2014 | Verónica Leal | Ana Teresa Casas | Íngrid Drexel |
| 2015 | Íngrid Drexel | Verónica Leal | Ana Teresa Casas |
| 2016 | Verónica Leal | Jesica Bonilla | Ana María Hernández |
| 2017 | Íngrid Drexel | Verónica Leal | Carolina Rodríguez |
| 2018 | Íngrid Drexel | Brenda Santoyo | Ana María Hernández |
| 2019 | Andrea Ramírez | Jesica Bonilla | Ana María Hernández |
| 2020 | Andrea Ramírez | Jesica Bonilla | Daniela Campuzano |
| 2021 | Adriana Barraza | Verónica Leal | Ana María Hernández |
| 2022 | Anet Barrera | Andrea Ramírez | Marcela Prieto |
| 2025 | Sara Roel | Andrea Ramírez | Anet Barrera |
