= 2013 UCI Road World Championships – Men's road race =

Men's road race
2013 UCI Road World Championships
- Rainbow jersey

Race details
- Dates: 29 September 2013
- Stages: 1
- Distance: 272.26 km (169.2 mi)
- Winning time: 7h 25' 44"

Medalists
| | Gold | Rui Costa (Portugal) |
| | Silver | Joaquim Rodríguez (Spain) |
| | Bronze | Alejandro Valverde (Spain) |

The Men's road race of the 2013 UCI Road World Championships was a cycling event that took take place on 29 September 2013 in the region of Tuscany, Italy.

The course of the race was 272.26 km (169.17 mi) from the town of Lucca to the Nelson Mandela Forum in Florence. As in previous years, the race was the final event of the Road World Championships. The race was won by Rui Costa who beat Joaquim Rodríguez in a sprint finish, with a total time of 7h 25min 44s, the second highest time in UCI Road World Championships history.

== Route ==
The race started in Lucca and ended in the Nelson Mandela Forum in Florence. The early part of the route was identified as particularly difficult, with climbs up the Montecatini Alto at 30 km (19 mi) and the San Baronto at 66 km (41 mi). The final run-in of the race around Florence was also hilly, with the ride up to Fiesole and the via Bolognese in Florence being particularly steep. This run-in was similar to that of stage 9 of the 2013 Giro d'Italia.

== National qualification ==
Qualification was based on performances on the UCI run tours during 2013. Results from January to the middle of August would count towards the qualification criteria on both the 2013 UCI World Tour and the UCI Continental Circuits across the world, with the rankings being determined upon the release of the numerous tour rankings on 15 August 2013.

== Schedule ==
| Date | Time | Event |
|---|---|---|
| 29 September 2013 | 10:00–16:45 | Men's road race |
| 29 September 2013 | 17:05 | Victory ceremony |

== Results ==
=== Final classification ===
Of the race's 208 entrants, 61 riders completed the full distance of 272.26 km (169.17 mi).

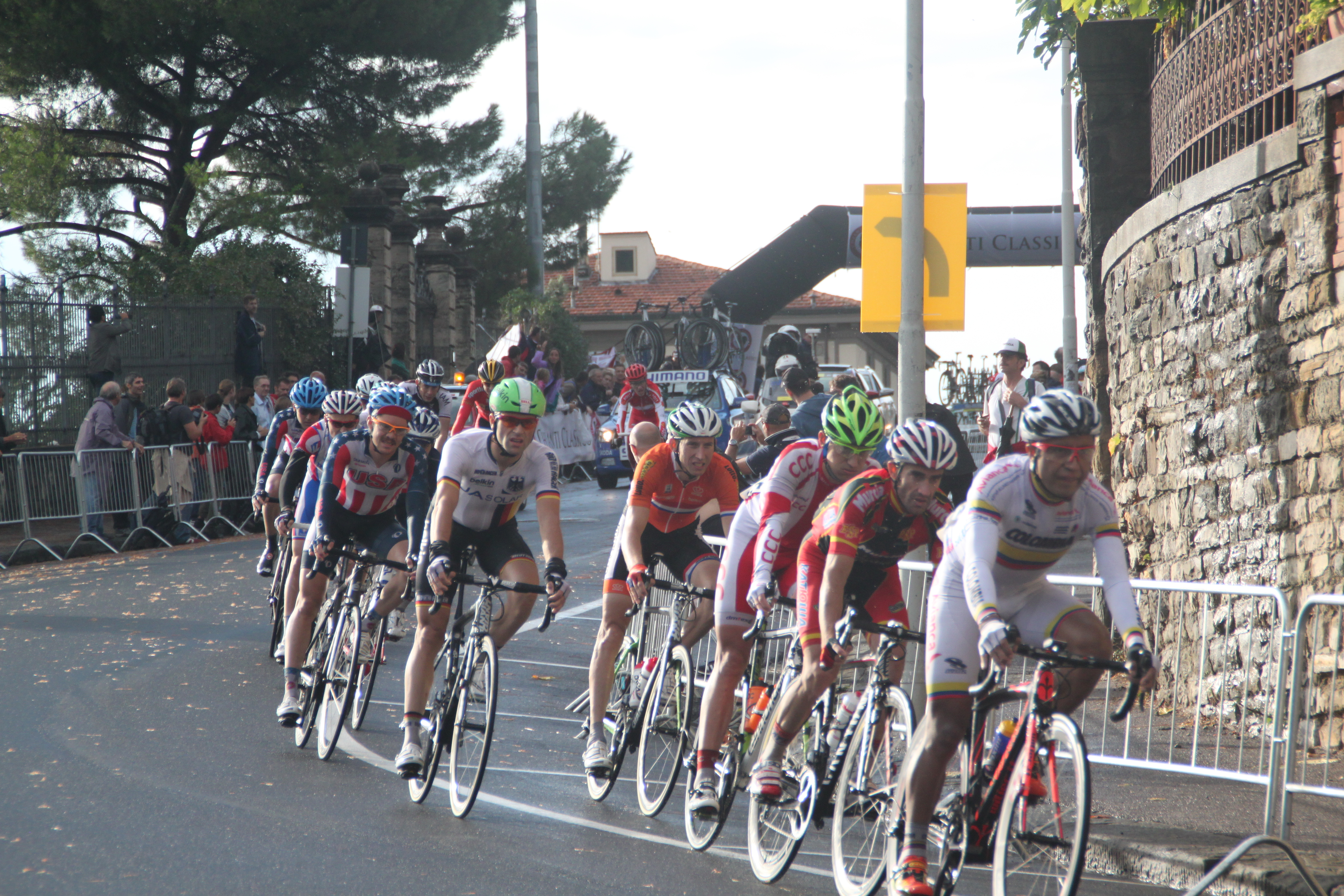
Peloton during the race

| Rank | Rider | Country | Time |
|---|---|---|---|
| Gold medal | Rui Costa | Portugal | 7h 25' 44" |
| Silver medal | Joaquim Rodríguez | Spain | s.t. |
| Bronze medal | Alejandro Valverde | Spain | + 15" |
| 4 | Vincenzo Nibali | Italy | + 15" |
| 5 | Andriy Hryvko | Ukraine | + 31" |
| 6 | Peter Sagan | Slovakia | + 34" |
| 7 | Simon Clarke | Australia | + 34" |
| 8 | Maxim Iglinsky | Kazakhstan | + 34" |
| 9 | Philippe Gilbert | Belgium | + 34" |
| 10 | Fabian Cancellara | Switzerland | + 34" |
| 11 | Bauke Mollema | Netherlands | + 34" |
| 12 | Lars Petter Nordhaug | Norway | + 34" |
| 13 | Daniel Moreno | Spain | + 34" |
| 14 | Simon Geschke | Germany | + 34" |
| 15 | Sergio Henao | Colombia | + 34" |
| 16 | Michele Scarponi | Italy | + 34" |
| 17 | Filippo Pozzato | Italy | + 1' 05" |
| 18 | Arthur Vichot | France | + 1' 05" |
| 19 | Maciej Paterski | Poland | + 1' 05" |
| 20 | Edvald Boasson Hagen | Norway | + 1' 05" |
| 21 | Jakob Fuglsang | Denmark | + 1' 05" |
| 22 | Ignatas Konovalovas | Lithuania | + 1' 26" |
| 23 | Greg Van Avermaet | Belgium | + 1' 26" |
| 24 | Yuri Trofimov | Russia | + 1' 26" |
| 25 | Pieter Weening | Netherlands | + 1' 44" |
| 26 | Zdeněk Štybar | Czech Republic | + 1' 59" |
| 27 | Aleksejs Saramotins | Latvia | + 2' 01" |
| 28 | Romain Bardet | France | + 2' 01" |
| 29 | Serge Pauwels | Belgium | + 2' 01" |
| 30 | Matija Kvasina | Croatia | + 2' 01" |
| 31 | Alex Howes | United States | + 2' 01" |
| 32 | Chris Anker Sørensen | Denmark | + 2' 01" |
| 33 | Michał Gołaś | Poland | + 2' 01" |
| 34 | Darwin Atapuma | Colombia | + 2' 01" |
| 35 | Carlos Betancur | Colombia | + 2' 01" |
| 36 | Tiago Machado | Portugal | + 2' 01" |
| 37 | Peter Stetina | United States | + 2' 01" |
| 38 | Stefan Denifl | Austria | + 2' 05" |
| 39 | Marcus Burghardt | Germany | + 3' 40" |
| 40 | Jan Polanc | Slovenia | + 3' 40" |
| 41 | Rigoberto Urán | Colombia | + 4' 27" |
| 42 | John Degenkolb | Germany | + 4' 53" |
| 43 | Sergey Chernetskiy | Russia | + 4' 55" |
| 44 | Anthony Roux | France | + 4' 55" |
| 45 | Grégory Rast | Switzerland | + 6' 24" |
| 46 | Thomas Löfkvist | Sweden | + 7' 27" |
| 47 | Andrei Nechita | Romania | + 8' 06" |
| 48 | Jonathan Castroviejo | Spain | + 8' 06" |
| 49 | Paul Martens | Germany | + 8' 06" |
| 50 | Thibaut Pinot | France | + 9' 09" |
| 51 | Giovanni Visconti | Italy | + 9' 15" |
| 52 | Bartosz Huzarski | Poland | + 9' 36" |
| 53 | Danilo Wyss | Switzerland | + 11' 20" |
| 54 | Jan Bárta | Czech Republic | + 11' 20" |
| 55 | Fabian Wegmann | Germany | + 11' 20" |
| 56 | Amaël Moinard | France | + 11' 20" |
| 57 | Jan Bakelants | Belgium | + 11' 20" |
| 58 | Rafał Majka | Poland | + 12' 55" |
| 59 | Cyril Gautier | France | + 15' 11" |
| 60 | Wilco Kelderman | Netherlands | + 15' 11" |
| 61 | Thomas Voeckler | France | + 15' 11" |

=== Riders who failed to finish ===
147 riders failed to finish the race.

| Rider | Country |
|---|---|
| Georg Preidler | Austria |
| Egoi Martínez | Spain |
| Maxime Monfort | Belgium |
| Michael Schär | Switzerland |
| Alberto Contador | Spain |
| Luis León Sánchez | Spain |
| Johan Vansummeren | Belgium |
| Robert Gesink | Netherlands |
| Sébastien Reichenbach | Switzerland |
| Tom-Jelte Slagter | Netherlands |
| François Parisien | Canada |
| Luca Paolini | Italy |
| Tobias Ludvigsson | Sweden |
| Yonder Godoy | Venezuela |
| Juan Pablo Magallanes | Mexico |
| Matthias Brändle | Austria |
| Alessandro Vanotti | Italy |
| Andrey Amador | Costa Rica |
| Diego Ulissi | Italy |
| Rinaldo Nocentini | Italy |
| Miguel Ángel Rubiano | Colombia |
| Sebastian Langeveld | Netherlands |
| Borut Božič | Slovenia |
| George Bennett | New Zealand |
| Alexandr Kolobnev | Russia |
| Matej Mugerli | Slovenia |
| Andrey Zeits | Kazakhstan |
| Mathew Hayman | Australia |
| Spas Gyurov | Bulgaria |
| Geraint Thomas | Great Britain |
| Tomasz Marczyński | Poland |
| Matej Jurčo | Slovakia |
| Rafaâ Chtioui | Tunisia |
| Thor Hushovd | Norway |
| Bernhard Eisel | Austria |
| Michael Albasini | Switzerland |
| Rory Sutherland | Australia |
| Cameron Meyer | Australia |
| Tanel Kangert | Estonia |
| Laurens ten Dam | Netherlands |
| Ivan Santaromita | Italy |
| Chris Froome | Great Britain |
| Tom Dumoulin | Netherlands |
| Christophe Riblon | France |
| Johnny Hoogerland | Netherlands |
| Markus Eibegger | Austria |
| Janez Brajkovič | Slovenia |
| Murilo Fischer | Brazil |
| Ian Stannard | Great Britain |

| Rider | Country |
|---|---|
| Ramūnas Navardauskas | Lithuania |
| Przemysław Niemiec | Poland |
| Janier Acevedo | Colombia |
| Cayetano Sarmiento | Colombia |
| Nairo Quintana | Colombia |
| Kristijan Koren | Slovenia |
| Andriy Khripta | Ukraine |
| Dan Martin | Ireland |
| Péter Kusztor | Hungary |
| Mathias Frank | Switzerland |
| Björn Leukemans | Belgium |
| Matthew Busche | United States |
| Jakub Novák | Czech Republic |
| Michael Matthews | Australia |
| Pedro Sequera | Venezuela |
| Rafael Andriato | Brazil |
| Riccardo Zoidl | Austria |
| Andrew Talansky | United States |
| Gert Jõeäär | Estonia |
| Gregory Brenes | Costa Rica |
| José Herrada | Spain |
| Youcef Reguigui | Algeria |
| Kwok Ho Ting | Hong Kong |
| Patrik Tybor | Slovakia |
| Mykhaylo Kononenko | Ukraine |
| Stanislav Kozubek | Czech Republic |
| František Raboň | Czech Republic |
| Fredrik Kessiakoff | Sweden |
| Reinardt Janse van Rensburg | South Africa |
| Steve Cummings | Great Britain |
| Josh Edmondson | Great Britain |
| Ioannis Tamouridis | Greece |
| Sylwester Szmyd | Poland |
| José Ragonessi | Ecuador |
| Jussi Veikkanen | Finland |
| Freddy Vargas | Venezuela |
| Jackson Rodríguez | Venezuela |
| Jonathan Monsalve | Venezuela |
| Daniel Teklehaymanot | Eritrea |
| Daryl Impey | South Africa |
| Luke Rowe | Great Britain |
| Richie Porte | Australia |
| Viesturs Lukševics | Latvia |
| Martin Elmiger | Switzerland |
| Warren Barguil | France |
| David Tanner | Australia |
| Oliver Zaugg | Switzerland |
| Cadel Evans | Australia |
| Samuel Sánchez | Spain |

| Rider | Country |
|---|---|
| Dominik Nerz | Germany |
| Michał Kwiatkowski | Poland |
| Martin Hunal | Czech Republic |
| Héctor Rangel | Mexico |
| Taylor Phinney | United States |
| Tejay van Garderen | United States |
| Bob Jungels | Luxembourg |
| Radoslav Rogina | Croatia |
| Kristijan Đurasek | Croatia |
| Carlos José Ochoa | Venezuela |
| Sergiy Grechyn | Ukraine |
| Rohan Dennis | Australia |
| Matt Brammeier | Ireland |
| Martin Velits | Slovakia |
| Sam Bewley | New Zealand |
| Meron Russom | Eritrea |
| Nicolas Roche | Ireland |
| Matti Breschel | Denmark |
| Vitaliy Buts | Ukraine |
| Alexey Lutsenko | Kazakhstan |
| Winner Anacona | Colombia |
| Enzo Moyano | Argentina |
| Peter Velits | Slovakia |
| Juraj Sagan | Slovakia |
| Cheung King-lok | Hong Kong |
| Serghei Țvetcov | Moldova |
| Loh Sea Keong | Malaysia |
| Bradley Wiggins | Great Britain |
| Mark Cavendish | Great Britain |
| Christian Meier | Canada |
| Uri Martins | Mexico |
| Jack Bauer | New Zealand |
| Chris Horner | United States |
| Andris Smirnovs | Latvia |
| André Cardoso | Portugal |
| Maciej Bodnar | Poland |
| Yaroslav Popovych | Ukraine |
| Sam Bennett | Ireland |
| Gediminas Bagdonas | Lithuania |
| Ivan Stević | Serbia |
| Lahcen Saber | Morocco |
| Adil Jelloul | Morocco |
| Reda Aadel | Morocco |
| Alo Jakin | Estonia |
| Grega Bole | Slovenia |
| Essaïd Abelouache | Morocco |
| Ismail Ayoune | Morocco |
| Jani Tewelde | Eritrea |
| Kanstantsin Sivtsov | Belarus |
