= José Aguirre (cyclist) =

Mexican cyclist (born 1994)

Personal information
- Full name: José Alfredo Aguirre Infante
- Born: 4 January 1994 (age 32) Lagos de Moreno, Mexico

Cycling career
- Sport: Cycling
- Current team: Petrolike
- Disciplines: Track; Road
- Role: Rider
- Rider type: Endurance (track)

Amateur teams
- 2016: Canel's–Specialized
- 2019: Crisa–SEEI Pro Cycling
- 2021: Crisa–SEEI
- 2022–2023: Tenis Stars

Professional teams
- 2017: Canel's–Specialized
- 2018: Inteja Dominican Cycling Team
- 2020: Crisa–SEEI Pro Cycling
- 2024–: Petrolike
Medal record
Representing Mexico
Men's road bicycle racing
Pan American Championships
Silver medal – second place	2017 Santo Domingo	Road race
Men's track cycling
Pan American Championships
Silver medal – second place	2018 Aguascalientes	Madison
Bronze medal – third place	2018 Aguascalientes	Team pursuit

José Alfredo Aguirre Infante (born 4 January 1994) is a Mexican track and road cyclist, who rides for UCI Continental team Petrolike. He competed in the madison and omnium events at the 2014 UCI Track Cycling World Championships.

== Major results ==
=== Road ===
2011
1st Road race, National Junior Championships
4th Overall Grand Prix Rüebliland
2017
1st Stage 3 Valley of the Sun Stage Race
2nd Road race, Pan American Road Championships
3rd Overall Ruta del Centro

1st Stage 1

2018
1st Prologue Tour de la Guadeloupe
2019
5th Road race, National Championships

=== Track ===
2013
Pan American Championships

2nd Omnium
3rd Team pursuit

2018
Central American and Caribbean Games

1st Madison (with Ignacio Sarabia)
1st Team pursuit

Pan American Championships

2nd Madison (with Ignacio Sarabia)
3rd Team pursuit
