= Luis Macias (cyclist) =

Mexican cyclist

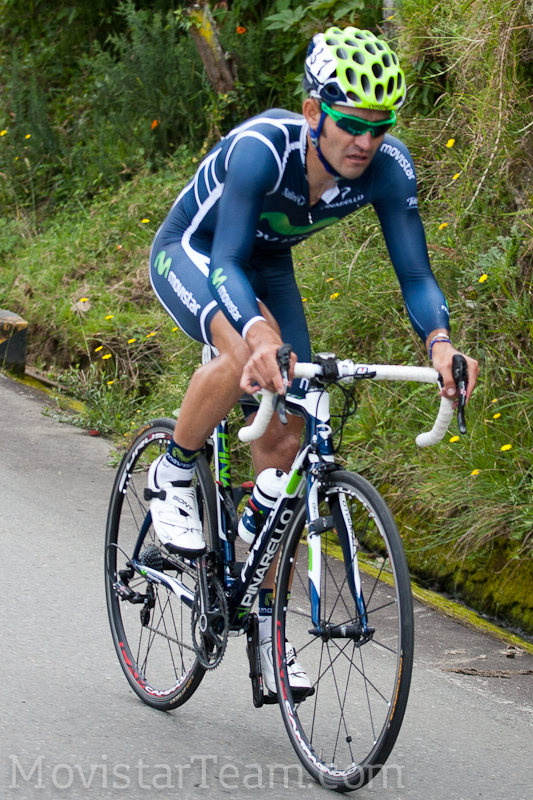

Personal information
- Full name: Luis Fernando Macias Hernandez
- Nickname: Luigi
- Born: 14 May 1982 (age 44) Lagos de Moreno, Jalisco, Mexico
- Height: 1.83 m (6 ft 0 in)
- Weight: 71 kg (157 lb)

Cycling career
- Sport: Cycling
- Current team: Retired
- Disciplines: Road; Track
- Role: Rider

Amateur teams
- 2004–2005: Alfus-Tedes
- 2010: Rock Racing–Murcia
- 2010: Canel's Turbo
- 2013–2014: Depredores Team Chetuma

Professional teams
- 2006: Chivas Cycling Team
- 2007–2009: Tecos Trek UAG
- 2011–2012: Movistar Continental Team

Major wins
- Mexico National Road Race Championships (2008) Vuelta Chihuahua Internacional 1 stage Vuelta Mexico Telmex 1 stage
Medal record
Men's road bicycle racing
Representing Mexico
Pan American Championships
Silver medal – second place	2008 Montevideo	Road race

Luis Fernando Macías Hernández (born 14 May 1982 in Lagos de Moreno, Jalisco) is a Mexican former professional cyclist. He won the Mexican national under-23 time trial championships in 2005. He returned to Mexico in 2006, after racing in Spain in 2004 and 2005, to compete for the Continental team Chivas Cycling Team and a year later Tecos-Trek. In 2008 he was the Mexican road race champion and won the silver medal in the road race at the Pan American Cycling Championships.

After the disbanding of the Tecos-Trek team in late 2009, for the 2010 season he signed with the American team Rock Racing–Murcia. The team had requested a position as a Professional Continental but was refused and was eventually downgraded to amateur. Macías competed for the team at the Vuelta Mexico Telmex and won the fourth stage. At the end of the year, he left the team and joined the Mexican team Canel's Turbo, also amateur, and competed in the Vuelta a Guatemala. For the 2011 season, Macias returned to professional cycling with the Movistar Continental Team.

== Major results ==
=== Road ===
2003
1st Time trial, National Under-23 Road Championships
2004
7th Coppa Citta di Asti
2006
3rd Road race, National Road Championships
2007
1st Stage 11b Vuelta a Cuba
2008
1st Road race, National Road Championships
1st Stage 6 Vuelta a Chihuahua
2nd Road race, Pan American Road Championships
2009
1st Stage 6 Vuelta a Puebla
1st Stage 2 Vuelta a Oaxaca
2010
1st Stage 4 Vuelta Mexico Telmex
3rd Road race, Central American and Caribbean Games
2011
1st Stage 9 Vuelta a Chiriquí
5th Road race, Pan American Road Championships
2012
1st Clasica León-San Luis
2014
1st Stage 3 Ruta del Centro

=== Track ===
2002
1st Madison, Central American and Caribbean Games
2006
1st Six Days of Aguascalientes (with Franco Marvulli)
1st Six Days of Mexico (with Franco Marvulli)
2009
1st Madison, Pan American Track Championships
2010
Central American and Caribbean Games

2nd Madison
3rd Team pursuit

2014
1st Team pursuit, National Track Championships
3rd Points race, Central American and Caribbean Games
