= Mexican National Road Race Championships =

National road cycling championship in Mexico

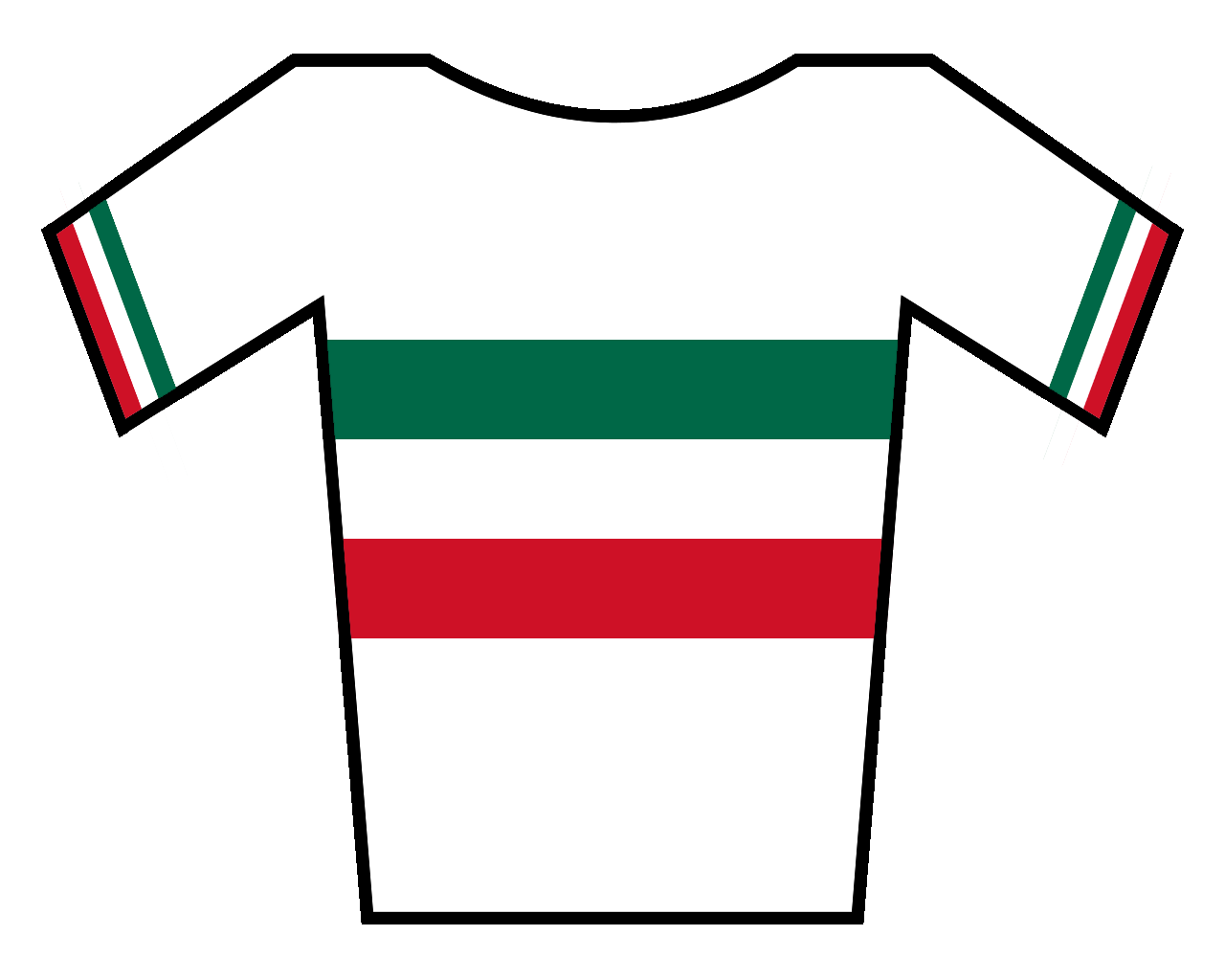
The champion's jersey

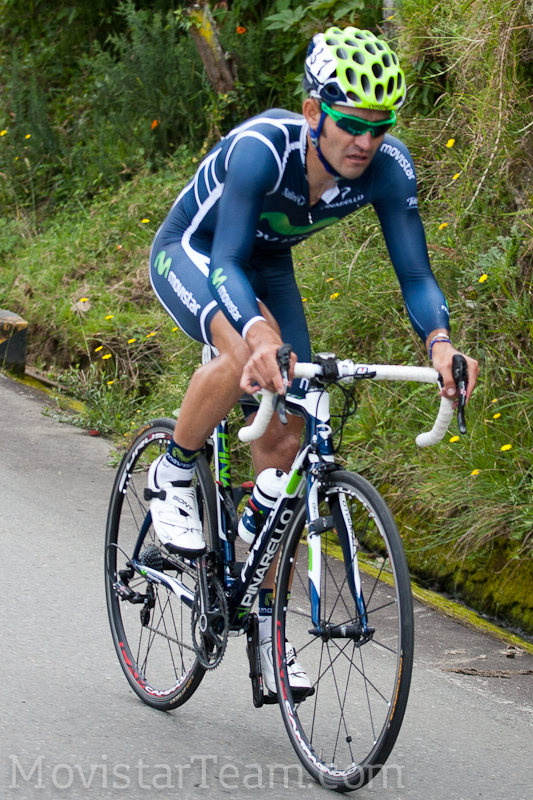
Luis Fernando Macías wearing the champions jersey

The Mexican Road Race Championships are held annually by the Mexican Cycling Federation (Spanish: Federación Mexicana de Ciclismo) to decide the Mexican cycling champions in the road race discipline, across various categories. The event was first held in 1998 and was won by Jesús Zárate.

== Men ==
=== Elite ===
Mexican National Road Race Championships – Men's elite race
Race details
- Region: Mexico
- Discipline: Road bicycle racing
- Type: One-day

History
- First edition: 1998
- First winner: Jesús Zárate
- Most wins: Luis Lemus (3 wins)
- Most recent: Efrén Santos

Year	Gold	Silver	Bronze
1998	Jesús Zárate		
1999	Eduardo Graciano	Carlos Hernández	Omar Martínez
2000	Miguel Arroyo	Alejandro Mendoza	José Luis Jiménez
2001	Juan Luis González	Miguel Arroyo	Andres Contreras
2002	Andres Contreras	Manuel Hernández	Manuel Carbajal
2003	Antonio Aldape		
2004	Not held		
2005	Domingo González	Armando Vigueras	Ricardo Tapia
2006	Juan de la Rosa	Irving Aguilar	Luis Fernando Macías
2007	Juan Pablo Magallanes	Carlos López	Francisco Matamoros
2008	Luis Fernando Macías	Bernardo Colex	David Salomon
2009	Florencio Ramos	Antonio Aldape	Juan Pablo Magallanes
2010	Carlos López	Luis Fernando Macías	Juan Manuel Sandoval
2011	Gregorio Ladino	Francisco Matamoros	Florencio Ramos
2012	Luis Lemus	Héctor Rangel	Luis Pulido
2013	Luis Lemus (2)	Luis Pulido	Luis Alvarez
2014	Ignacio Sarabia	Eder Frayre	Francisco Matamoros
2015	Ignacio Prado	Ignacio Sarabia	Luis Alvarez
2016	Luis Lemus (3)	Luis Alvarez	Eder Frayre
2017	Efrén Santos	Eduardo Corte	Uri Martins
2018	Orlando Garibay	Ulises Alfredo Castillo	Ivan Carbajal
2019	Ignacio Prado (2)	Ulises Alfredo Castillo	Francisco Lara
2020	Ulises Alfredo Castillo	Gerardo Ulloa	Emery Hernandez Vazquez
2021	Eder Frayre	Orlando Garibay	Flavio de Luna
2022	Without official validity		
2023	Without official validity		
2024	Without official validity		
2025	Isaac Del Toro	Eder Frayre	José Gerardo Ulloa

=== U23 ===
Year	Gold	Silver	Bronze
2006	Luis Pulido	Ramón López	Juan Enrique Diaz
2007	Eder Arenas	Uriel Clara	Omar Cervantes
2008	Luis Pulido	Elliott Vazquez	José Carlos Valdez
2009	Armando Aguilar	Josué González	Ivan Carbajal
2010	Cesar Vaquera		
2011	René Corella	Uri Martins	Ángel Portillo
2012	Luis Lemus	Flavio de Luna	José Bravo

== Women ==
=== Elite ===
Mexican National Road Race Championships – Women's elite race
Race details
- Region: Mexico
- Discipline: Road bicycle racing
- Type: One-day

History
- First edition: 1999
- First winner: Giuseppina Grassi
- Most wins: Giuseppina Grassi; Íngrid Drexel; (3 wins)
- Most recent: Mariana Torres

Year	Gold	Silver	Bronze
1999	Giuseppina Grassi	Patricia Palencia Aleman	Sonia López
2000	Patricia Palencia Aleman	Adriana Sanchez	Claudia Verónica Leal Balderas
2001	Belem Guerrero	Patricia Palencia Aleman	Gabriella Gonzalez de Ferrat
2002	Not held		
2003	Belem Guerrero		
2004– 2005	Not held		
2006	Giuseppina Grassi	Rosario Peralta	Maribel Díaz
2007	Maribel Díaz	Rosario Peralta	Giuseppina Grassi
2008	Giuseppina Grassi	Jessica Jurado	Laura Morfin
2009	Verónica Leal	Sofía Arreola	Jessica Jurado
2010	Verónica Leal	Ana Teresa Casas	Sofía Arreola
2011	Dulce Pliego	Ana Teresa Casas	Mayra Rocha
2012	Íngrid Drexel	Giuseppina Grassi	Carolina Rodríguez
2013	Íngrid Drexel	Ana Teresa Casas	Carolina Rodríguez
2014	Ana Teresa Casas	Erika Varela	Jenny Rios Piñal
2015	Erika Varela	Íngrid Drexel	Marcela Prieto
2016	Ana María Hernández	Carolina Rodríguez	Sofía Arreola
2017	Íngrid Drexel	Carolina Rodríguez	Marcela Prieto
2018	Brenda Santoyo	Ariadna Gutiérrez	Cynthia Covarrubias
2019	Anet Barrera	Ariadna Gutiérrez	Andrea Ramírez
2020	Antonieta Gaxiola	Ana Teresa Casas	Brenda Santoyo
2021	Lizbeth Salazar	Antonieta Gaxiola	Katia Martinez
2022	Without official validity		
2023	Without official validity		
2024	Without official validity		
2025	Andrea Ramírez	Romina Hinojosa	Maria Carolina Flores
