= Luis Villalobos (cyclist) =

Mexican cyclist

Personal information
- Full name: Luis Ricardo Villalobos Hernández
- Born: 26 June 1998 (age 28) El Refugio, Jalisco, Mexico
- Height: 1.8 m (5 ft 11 in)
- Weight: 66 kg (146 lb)

Cycling career
- Sport: Cycling
- Current team: Provisionally suspended
- Discipline: Road
- Role: Rider

Professional teams
- 2017–2019: Aevolo
- 2019–2020: EF Education First

Major wins
- One-day races and Classics National Time Trial Championships (2018, 2019)
Medal record
Men's track cycling
Representing Mexico
Pan American Championships
Bronze medal – third place	2018 Aguascalientes	Individual pursuit

Luis Ricardo Villalobos Hernández (born 26 June 1998) is a Mexican cyclist, provisionally suspended from the sport due to an adverse analytical finding (AAF) for GHRP-6 in 2019.

Villalobos joined EF Education First in July 2019, after two-and-a-half seasons with the Aevolo team. He was provisionally suspended by the Union Cycliste Internationale (UCI) and indefinitely suspended by EF Pro Cycling in May 2020 following an Adverse Analytical Finding (AAF), which suggested he had been doping during his time at Aevolo.

== Major results ==
2014
National Novice Road Championships

1st Road race
1st Time trial

2015
1st Road race, Pan American Junior Road Championships
National Junior Road Championships

1st Road race
1st Time trial

5th Overall Tour de l'Abitibi
2016
Pan American Junior Road Championships

1st Time trial
2nd Road race

National Junior Road Championships

1st Road race
1st Time trial

2nd Overall Sint-Martinusprijs Kontich

1st Points classification
1st Stage 2

2nd Overall Niedersachsen Rundfahrt
7th Overall Oberösterreich Juniorenrundfahrt
2017
1st Young rider classification Cascade Cycling Classic
2nd Time trial, National Road Championships
2nd Road race, National Under-23 Road Championships
2018
1st Time trial, National Road Championships
5th Chrono Kristin Armstrong
8th Overall Tour of Utah

1st Young rider classification

2019
1st Time trial, National Road Championships
3rd Winston-Salem Cycling Classic
