= Edgar Cadena =

Mexican cyclist (born 2000)

Personal information
- Full name: Edgar David Cadena Martínez
- Born: 20 August 2000 (age 26) Mexico City, Mexico
- Height: 1.70 m (5 ft 7 in)
- Weight: 62 kg (137 lb)

Cycling career
- Sport: Cycling
- Current team: Petrolike
- Discipline: Road
- Role: Rider

Amateur teams
- 2019: Ciclismo Riojano–Vega Bike
- 2020: Antiga Casa Bellsolà Girona CT
- 2022: Canel's–Zerouno
- 2022–2023: Telcom–On Clima–Osés Const

Professional teams
- 2021: A.R. Monex Pro Cycling Team
- 2023: Green Project–Bardiani–CSF–Faizanè (stagiaire)
- 2024–: Petrolike

Major wins
- One-day races and Classics National Road Race Championships (2023, 2024)
Medal record
Representing Mexico
Men's road cycling
Central American and Caribbean Games
| Silver medal – second place | 2026 Santo Domingo | Time trial |

Edgar David Cadena Martínez (born 20 August 2000) is a Mexican track and road cyclist, who rides for UCI Continental team Petrolike.

== Major results ==
2020
1st Time trial, National Under-23 Road Championships
2022
1st Overall Vuelta a Salamanca

1st Mountains classification
1st Young rider classification
1st Stage 2

1st Stage 7 Vuelta a Colombia
National Road Championships

2nd Road race
4th Time trial

2nd Overall Tour of Galicia

1st Stage 2

2023
National Road Championships

1st Road race
2nd Time trial

1st Overall Vuelta a Salamanca

1st Points classification

2nd Overall Tour of Galicia

1st Stage 3

2nd Trofeo Eusebio Vélez
2024
1st Road race, National Road Championships
7th Overall Vuelta a Colombia
2025
1st Overall Oberösterreich Rundfahrt

1st Points classification
1st Stage 3

2026
2nd Time trial, CAC Games
10th Overall Deutschland Tour
