= Eder Frayre =

Mexican cyclist (born 1991)

Personal information
- Full name: Eder Frayre Moctezuma
- Born: 20 October 1991 (age 34) Ensenada, Baja California, Mexico

Cycling career
- Sport: Cycling
- Current team: Miami Blazers
- Discipline: Road
- Role: Rider

Amateur team
- 2024–: Miami Blazers

Professional teams
- 2015: IRT Racing
- 2017–2018: Elevate–KHS Pro Cycling
- 2019: DCBank Pro Cycling Team
- 2021–2023: L39ION of Los Angeles

Major wins
- One-day races and Classics National Road Race Championships (2021)

Eder Frayre Moctezuma (born 20 October 1991) is an Olympic athlete and professional Mexican cyclist, who currently rides for club team Miami Blazers.

== Major results ==
2013
1st Road race, National Under-23 Road Championships
2014
National Road Championships

2nd Road race
4th Time trial

2016
3rd Road race, National Road Championships
4th Road race, Pan American Road Championships
2018
6th Overall Tour de Taiwan
2019
1st Stage 3 Tour of Southland
3rd Overall Redlands Bicycle Classic
8th Overall Tour of the Gila
2021
1st Road race, National Road Championships
2022
8th Overall Joe Martin Stage Race
2023
1st Overall Tour of Tobago

1st Stages 2 & 4

5th Overall Redlands Bicycle Classic
8th Overall Joe Martin Stage Race
10th Maryland Cycling Classic
2025
1st Overall Redlands Bicycle Classic
2026
8th Philadelphia Cycling Classic
