= Carolina Rodríguez (cyclist) =

Mexican cyclist

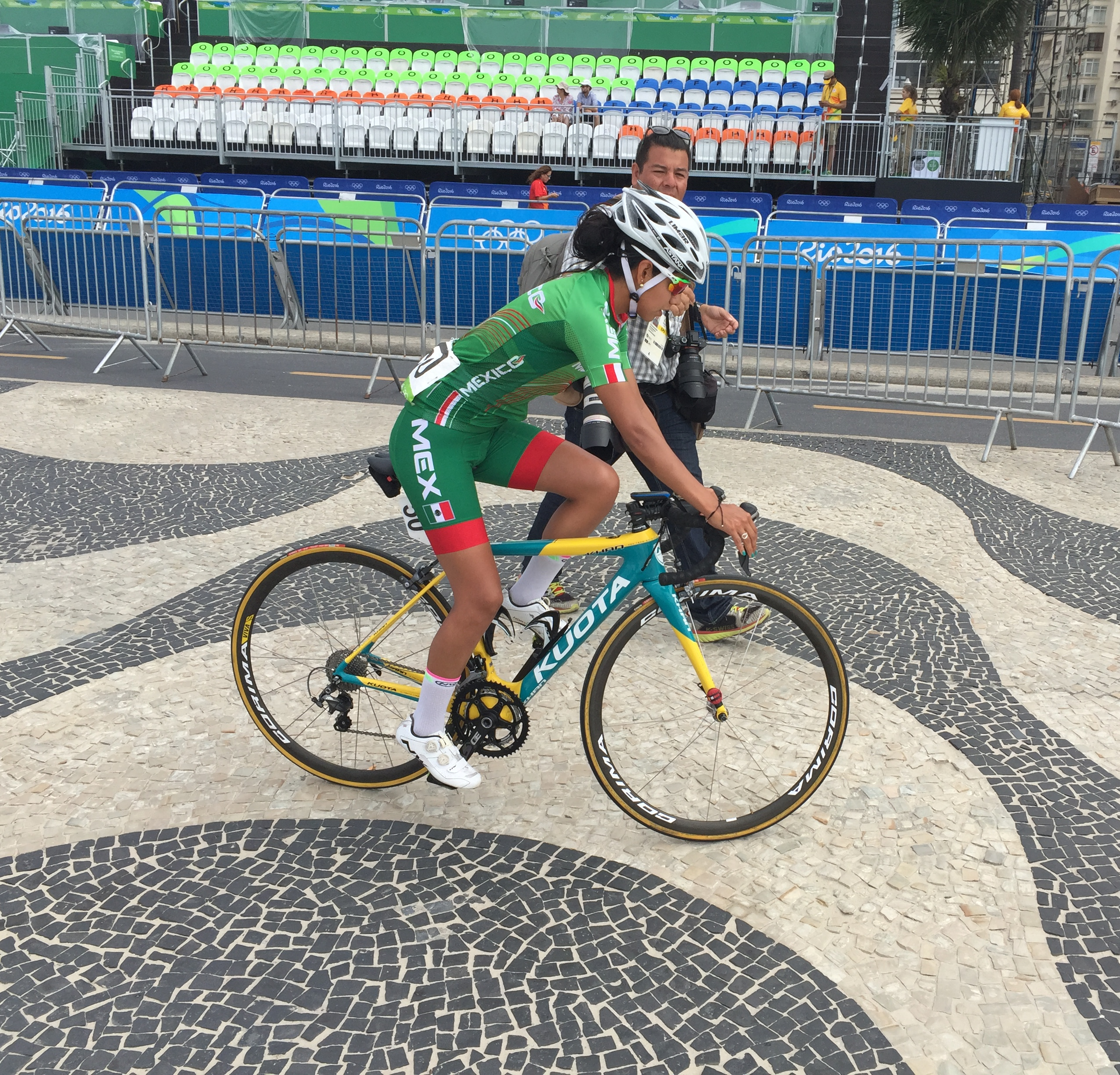
- Rodríguez at the 2016 Summer Olympics

Personal information
- Full name: Carolina Rodríguez Gutiérrez
- Born: 30 September 1993 (age 33) Toluca, Mexico

Cycling career
- Sport: Cycling
- Discipline: Road
- Role: Rider

Professional teams
- 2014: Estado de México–Faren Kuota
- 2015–2019: Astana–Acca Due O

Carolina Rodríguez Gutiérrez (born 30 September 1993) is a Mexican racing cyclist, who last rode for UCI Women's Team Astana. She competed in the 2013 UCI women's road race in Florence.

== Major results ==
2012
3rd Road race, National Road Championships
2013
3rd Road race, National Road Championships
2015
5th Overall Vuelta Internacional Femenina a Costa Rica
2016
2nd Road race, National Road Championships
4th Grand Prix de Venezuela
5th Overall Vuelta Internacional Femenina a Costa Rica
8th Overall Vuelta Femenil Internacional
2017
National Road Championships

2nd Road race
3rd Time trial

2018
6th Overall Tour of California
2019
1st Stage 3 Vuelta Femenina a Guatemala
