= Cycling at the 2018 Central American and Caribbean Games =

- Venue: Various
- Location: (Colombia) Barranquilla
- Dates: 20 – 29 July

The cycling competition at the 2018 Central American and Caribbean Games was held from 20 to 29 July. The BMX events were held at Villa Carolina, the mountain biking events were held at the Pista Pelicanos, the road cycling events were held at Dapa Mall, Palmira and Buga and the track cycling events were held at the Velódromo Alcides Nieto Patiño

== Medal summary ==
=== Road events ===
Event	Gold	Silver	Bronze
Men's road race	Nelson Soto (COL)	Christofer Jurado (PAN)	Carlos Linares (VEN)
Women's road race	Teniel Campbell (TTO)	Yudelmis Domínguez (CUB)	Lizbeth Salazar (MEX)
Men's time trial	Rodrigo Contreras (COL)	Walter Vargas (COL)	Pedro Portuondo (CUB)
Women's time trial	Arlenis Sierra (CUB)	Ana Sanabria (COL)	Sérika Gulumá (COL)

=== Track events ===
Event	Gold	Silver	Bronze
Men's sprint	Nicholas Paul (TTO)	Fabián Puerta (COL)	Kevin Quintero (COL)
Women's sprint	Jessica Salazar (MEX)	Martha Bayona (COL)	Yuli Verdugo (MEX)
Men's team sprint	Trinidad and Tobago (TTO); Nicholas Paul; Kwesi Browne; Njisane Phillip	Venezuela (VEN); Hersony Canelón; César Marcano; Gabriel Quintero	Colombia (COL); Rubén Murillo; Fabián Puerta; Kevin Quintero; Anderson Parra
Men's 1 km time trial	Nicholas Paul (TTO)	Kevin Quintero (COL)	Luis Cordon (GUA)
Women's 500m time trial	Jessica Salazar (MEX)	Daniela Gaxiola (MEX)	Martha Bayona (COL)
Men's keirin	Fabián Puerta (COL)	Hersony Canelón (VEN)	Kwesi Browne (TTO)
Women's keirin	Jessica Salazar (MEX)	Daniela Gaxiola (MEX)	Martha Bayona (COL)
Men's individual pursuit	Ignacio Prado (MEX)	Juan Esteban Arango (COL)	Eduardo Estrada (COL)
Women's individual pursuit	Marlies Mejías (CUB)	Arlenis Sierra (CUB)	Teniel Campbell (TTO)
Men's team pursuit	Mexico (MEX); Edibaldo Maldonado; José Aguirre; Ignacio Sarabia; Ignacio Prado	Venezuela (VEN); Clever Martínez; Ángel Pulgar; Carlos Linares; Leonel Quintero	Colombia (COL); Carlos Tobón; Edwin Ávila; Juan Esteban Arango; Eduardo Estrada; Marvin Angarita
Women's team pursuit	Cuba (CUB); Yudelmis Domínguez; Marlies Mejías; Maylin Sanchez; Arlenis Sierra	Colombia (COL); Sérika Gulumá; Jessica Parra; Milena Salcedo; Tatiana Dueñas; Yeny Colmenares	Mexico (MEX); Jessica Bonilla; Lizbeth Salazar; Sofía Arreola; Mayra Rocha; Ana Casas
Men's scratch race	Ángel Pulgar (VEN)	Leandro Marcos (CUB)	Emiliano Mirafuentes (MEX)
Women's scratch race	Marlies Mejías (CUB)	Lizbeth Salazar (MEX)	Teniel Campbell (TTO)
Men's points race	Ignacio Sarabia (MEX)	Marvin Angarita (COL)	Clever Martínez (VEN)
Women's points race	Lilibeth Chacón (VEN)	Yeny Colmenares (COL)	Arlenis Sierra (CUB)
Men's madison	Mexico (MEX); José Aguirre; Ignacio Sarabia	Colombia (COL); Edwin Ávila; Juan Esteban Arango	Venezuela (VEN); Clever Martínez; Máximo Rojas
Women's madison	Cuba (CUB); Arlenis Sierra; Yudelmis Domínguez	Mexico (MEX); Lizbeth Salazar; Sofía Arreola	Colombia (COL); Jessica Parra; Milena Salcedo
Men's omnium	Edwin Ávila (COL)	Ignacio Prado (MEX)	Akil Campbell (TTO)
Women's omnium	Lizbeth Salazar (MEX)	Yudelmis Domínguez (CUB)	Teniel Campbell (TTO)

=== Mountain events ===
Event	Gold	Silver	Bronze
Men's cross country	Gerardo Ulloa (MEX)	Jhonnatan Botero Villegas (COL)	Fabio Castañeda (COL)
Women's cross country	Daniela Campuzano (MEX)	Laura Abril (COL)	Milagro Mena (CRC)

=== BMX events ===
Event	Gold	Silver	Bronze
Men's BMX	Jefferson Milano (VEN)	Carlos Ramírez (COL)	Carlos Oquendo (COL)
Women's BMX	Gabriela Bolle (COL)	Dayanna Hernández (MEX)	María Isabel Méndez (GUA)

== Medal table ==
* Host nation (Colombia)

Rank	Nation	Gold	Silver	Bronze	Total
1	Mexico (MEX)	10	6	4	20
2	Colombia (COL)*	5	13	10	28
3	Cuba (CUB)	5	4	2	11
4	Trinidad and Tobago (TRI)	4	0	5	9
5	Venezuela (VEN)	3	3	3	9
6	Panama (PAN)	0	1	0	1
7	Guatemala (GUA)	0	0	2	2
8	Costa Rica (CRC)	0	0	1	1
Totals (8 entries)		27	27	27	81
