= Cristian Valenzuela =

Cristian Valenzuela may refer to:

- Cristian Valenzuela Bustos (born 1981), Chilean political adviser under President Kast
- Cristian Valenzuela (sprinter) (Valenzuela Guzmán, born 1983), Chilean Paralympic sprinter
- Cristian Valenzuela, Mexican cyclist, participated in the Mexican National Time Trial Championships
