= El Refugio =

El Refugio ("The Refuge") may refer to:

== Places ==
- El Refugio, Ahuachapán, El Salvador, a municipality
- El Refugio, Baja California, Mexico, a city
- El Refugio, Jalisco, Mexico, a town
- El Refugio, Texas, United States, a census-designated place

== Entertainment ==
- El refugio (film), Spanish title of a 2021 Christmas comedy film
- El refugio (TV series), a Mexican telenovela

== See also ==
- Refugio (disambiguation)
