= 2010 Vuelta Mexico Telmex =

The 2010 edition of the Vuelta Mexico Telmex was won by Óscar Sevilla of Rock Racing Team.

== Jersey Holders ==
Year	Winner	Nationality	Team
Overall Leader	Óscar Sevilla	Spain	Rock Racing
Combativity Leader	Florencio Ramos	Mexico	Chiapas Tequila Afamado
Mountain Leader	Rodolfo Torres	Colombia	Boyacá Orgullo Nacional
Best Mexican	Ignacio Sarabia	Mexico	Rock Racing
u23 leader	Jose Ramon Aguirre	Mexico	Canel's Turbo

== Teams ==
- (Ukraine) Amore & Vita Conad
- (Mexico) Arenas Tlaxcala
- (Colombia) Bocaya Orgullo de América
- (Mexico) Canel's Turbo
- (Armenia) CKT Champion System
- (Mexico) Empacadora San Marcos
- (Mexico) ISD Neri
- (Mexico) Orven
- (Mexico) PRODEG CEDAJ Guanajuato
- (Mexico) Rock Racing
- (Mexico) Selección Chiapas Tequila Afamado
- Selección Cuba
- Selección Guatemala
- Selección Venezuela
- (Canada) Spider Tech by Planet Energy
- (Denmark) Team Concordia Forsikring
- (Germany) Team Kuota Indeland
- (United Kingdom) Team Raleigh
- (United States) Team Type One
- (Mexico) Veracruz

== Results by stage ==
Stage	Date	Course	Distance	Type	Winner
1	April 17				(Slovenia) Aldo Ilesic
2	April 18	Veracruz–Xalapa	108	Medium-mountain stage	(Canada) François Parisien
3	April 19	Xalapa–Orizaba	173		(Mexico) Ignacio Sarabia
4	April 20	Orizaba–Tlaxcala	220		(Spain) Luis F. Macías
5	April 21	Tlaxcala–Cuautla	175		(Mexico) Flavio de Luna
6	April 23	Cuernavaca–Metepec	180	Mountain stage	(Mexico) Ignacio Sarabia
7	April 24	Ajusco	11	Individual time trial	(Colombia) Rodolfo Torres
8	April 25	Reforma Circuit	100	Flat stage	(Denmark) Philip Nielsen

== General Classification ==
Rank	Rider	Team	Time
	Óscar Sevilla (ESP)	Rock Racing	26h 34 18"
2	José Rincón (COL)	Boyacá Orgullo de America	+ 13"
3	Gregorio Ladino (COL)	Boyacá Orgullo de America	+ 18"
4	Víctor Niño (COL)	Orven	+ 45"
5	Ignacio Sarabia (MEX)	Rock Racing	+ 46"
