= Cycling at the 2018 Central American and Caribbean Games – Qualification =

For the cycling competitions at the 2018 Central American and Caribbean Games, the following qualification systems took place.

== Summary ==
Nation	Road				Track																			MTB		BMX		Total	
Nation	Men		Women		Men										Women									M	W	M	W	Q	R
Nation	RR	TT	RR	TT	TS	KE	SP	TP	OM	TT	SR	MA	PR	IP	KE	SP	TP	OM	TT	SR	MA	PR	IP	M	W	M	W	Q	R
Aruba																										1		1	
Barbados	2	2							1		1	X	1					1		1		1						11	
Belize	1	1	2	2																								6	
Bermuda			1																									1	
Colombia	6	2	6	2	X	2	2	X	1	2	1	X	2	2	2	2	X	1	2	1	X	2	2	2	2	2	2	53	
Costa Rica	3	1	4	1														1						2	2	1		15	
Cuba	6	1	5	1	X	2	2	X	1	2	1	X	2	2	2	2	X	1	2	1	X	2	2	2	1			45	
Curaçao	2	1	1	1					1																		1	7	
Dominican Republic	4	1	1		X	2	1	X	1		1	X	2	2										1		1		20	
El Salvador	1																											1	
Guadeloupe	5	2	1	1																								9	
Guatemala	6	2	4	1	X	2	2	X	1	2	1	X	2	1	1	1	X	1	1	1		2	1	2	1		2	41	
Guyana						1					1		1															3	
Honduras	3		2																					1	1			7	
Jamaica									1		1																	2	
Martinique	2																											2	
Mexico	6	1	5	1	X	2	2	X	1	2	1	X	2	2	2	2	X	1	2	1	X	2	2	2	2	1	1	48	
Nicaragua	1	1	1	1																				2	1			7	
Panama	3	2																										5	
Puerto Rico									1		1													2				4	
Sint Maarten	1																											1	
Suriname						1	1																					2	
Trinidad and Tobago			2	2	X	2	2	X	1	2	1	X	2	2				1		1	X	2	2					26	
Saint Vincent and the Grenadines	1																											1	
Venezuela	6	2	6	2	X	2	2	X	1	1	1	X	2	2	1	1	X	1	1	1	X	2	2	1		2	1	45	
Total: NOCs	59	19	41	15	7	16	14	7	11	11	11	8	16	13	8	8	5	8	8	7	5	13	11	17	10	8	7	363	
Ref																													

Legend

- TS – Team Sprint
- KE – Keirin
- SP – Sprint
- TP – Team Pursuit
- OM – Omnium
- RR – Road Race
- TT – Individual Time Trial
- SR – Scratch Race
- MA – Madison
- PR – Points Race
- IR – Individual Pursuit
- Q – Quotas
- R – Riders
