= A.R. Monex Pro Cycling Team =

Sammarinese/Mexican cycling team

Team information
- Registered: San Marino
- Founded: 2021
- Discipline: Road
- Status: UCI Continental (2021–)

Key personnel
- General manager: Luis Rodríguez Acevedo, Alejandro Rodríguez Acevedo
- Team manager: Alejandro Rodríguez Acevedo

Team name history
- 2021–: A.R. Monex Pro Cycling Team

A.R. Monex Pro Cycling Team is a UCI Continental cycling team registered in San Marino. Though the team is registered in San Marino, being the first team to do so since Amica Chips–Knauf in 2009, the team is made up of mostly Mexican riders and staff. The team was founded in 2021 by brothers Luis and Alejandro Rodríguez Acevedo of Mexico City, Mexico, with a focus on fostering under-23 Mexican talent.

== Team roster ==
As of 24 March 2021.

Rider	Date of birth
Miguel Arroyo (MEX)	1 August 2000 (age 26)
Edgar Cadena (MEX)	20 August 2000 (age 26)
Carlos Mier y Terán (MEX)	26 February 1999 (age 27)
José Eduardo Miralrio (MEX)	24 March 2002 (age 24)
Federico Olei (SMR)	3 August 1996 (age 30)

Rider	Date of birth
Jorge Ramírez (MEX)	16 February 1999 (age 27)
Andrés Torres (MEX)	14 June 2002 (age 24)
Jorge Valles (MEX)	27 April 2001 (age 25)
Leonardo Zavala (MEX)	24 October 2001 (age 24)
