= Luis Lemus =

Mexican bicycle racer

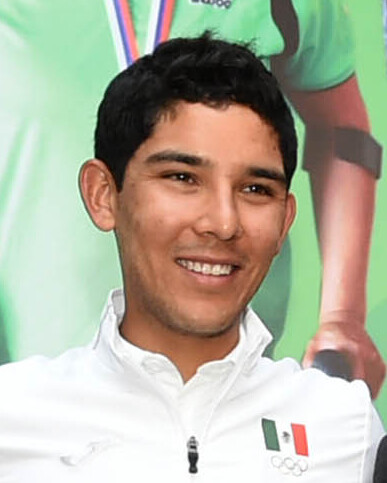
- Lemus in 2016

Personal information
- Full name: Luis Enrique Lemus Dávila
- Born: 21 April 1992 (age 34) Aguascalientes City, Mexico

Cycling career
- Sport: Cycling
- Current team: Retired
- Discipline: Road
- Role: Rider
- Rider type: Climber

Professional teams
- 2012–2014: Jelly Belly Cycling Team
- 2015: Airgas–Safeway
- 2016–2018: Cycling Academy

Luis Enrique Lemus Dávila (born 21 April 1992 in Aguascalientes City) is a Mexican former professional cyclist, who rode professionally between 2012 and 2018 for the Jelly Belly–Maxxis, Airgas–Safeway and Israel Cycling Academy teams.

== Major results ==
2011
2nd Time trial, National Under-23 Road Championships
2012
1st Road race, National Road Championships
2013
1st Road race, National Road Championships
2014
1st Road race, National Road Championships
5th Overall Tour de Hokkaido

1st Stage 2

2016
1st Road race, National Road Championships
9th Overall Sibiu Cycling Tour
2018
2nd Time trial, National Road Championships
