= Erika Varela =

Mexican cyclist

Personal information
- Full name: Erika Haydee Varela Huerta
- Born: 3 April 1994 (age 32)

Cycling career
- Sport: Cycling
- Discipline: Road
- Role: Rider

Amateur teams
- 2017–2018: Conade–Visit México–Specialized
- 2019: Durango–Specialized–IED

Erika Haydee Varela Huerta (born 3 April 1994) is a Mexican racing cyclist. She rode in the women's road race at the 2015 UCI Road World Championships.

== Major results ==
2014
2nd Road race, National Road Championships
2015
1st Road race, National Road Championships
4th Overall Vuelta Internacional Femenina a Costa Rica

1st Points classification
1st Stages 1 & 4

2016
1st Stage 4 Vuelta Internacional Femenina a Costa Rica
6th Clasico FVCiclismo Corre Por la VIDA
8th Copa Federación Venezolana de Ciclismo
