= Refugio =

Refugio ("Refuge") may refer to:

== Places ==
- Refugio County, Texas, United States
  - Refugio, Texas, a town in the county
- Refugio State Beach, near Santa Barbara, California
- Refugio Canyon, a region on the Gaviota Coast, California
- Refugio Creek, a river running along Refugio Valley from the hills of western Contra Costa County, California

== Other uses ==
- Refugio, a 2003 album by Apocalypse
- Refugio (Hendrix), a 2009 sculpture by Jan Hendrix
- Battle of Refugio, fought in 1836 near Refugio, Texas
- Refugio oil spill – 2015 pipeline leak on the coast of California
- Refugio railway station, a Guadalajara light rail station

== See also ==
- El Refugio (disambiguation)
- Rancho Nuestra Señora del Refugio, the Spanish land grant in what is today Santa Barbara County, California
- Mission Nuestra Señora del Refugio near Refugio, Texas
