= Bernardo Colex =

Mexican cyclist (born 1983)

Personal information
- Full name: Bernardo Colex Tepoz
- Born: 3 July 1983 (age 43) Puebla, Mexico

Cycling career
- Sport: Cycling
- Current team: Arenas
- Discipline: Road
- Role: Rider

Amateur teams
- 2013–2014: Depredadores Chetumal
- 2015: Pronto Crédit
- 2015–2019: Arenas Tlax-Mex

Professional teams
- 2006: Chivas Cycling Team
- 2007–2009: Tecos de la Universidad Autónoma de Guadalajara
- 2010–2011: Amore & Vita–Conad
Medal record
Representing Mexico
Men's road cycling
Central American and Caribbean Games
Bronze medal – third place	2014 Veracruz	Time trial

Bernardo Colex Tepoz (born 3 July 1983) is a Mexican former professional road cyclist. He won the Mexican National Time Trial Championships four times between 2011 and 2014.

== Major results ==
2006
1st Stage 2 Vuelta a Chihuahua
4th Road race, National Road Championships
4th Overall Vuelta Sonora
2007
1st Stage 3 Doble Sucre Potosí GP Cemento Fancesa
3rd Overall Vuelta a El Salvador
8th Overall Vuelta a Cuba
8th Univest Grand Prix
2008
2nd Road race, National Road Championships
2nd Overall Tour de Beauce

1st Stage 1

9th Overall Doble Sucre Potosí GP Cemento Fancesa
2009
2nd Time trial, National Road Championships
5th Overall Vuelta Ciclista Chiapas

1st Stage 5

5th Overall Doble Sucre Potosí GP Cemento Fancesa

1st Stage 4

7th Overall Vuelta Mexico Telmex
10th Overall Vuelta a Bolivia
10th Overall Vuelta a Cuba
2011
1st Time trial, National Road Championships
1st Stage 6 (ITT) Vuelta Ciclista Chiapas
2nd Overall Tour de Beauce
10th Road race, Pan American Games
2012
1st Time trial, National Road Championships
2013
1st Time trial, National Road Championships
3rd Overall Ruta del Centro
2014
1st Time trial, National Road Championships
1st Overall Ruta del Centro

1st Stage 4

Central American and Caribbean Games

3rd Time trial
9th Road race

2016
4th Time trial, National Road Championships
