= Orlando Garibay =

Mexican cyclist (1993–2023)

Personal information
- Full name: Orlando Trinidad Garibay Contreras
- Born: 13 October 1993 La Barca, Jalisco, Mexico
- Died: 3 November 2023 (aged 30) Sahuayo, Michoacán, Mexico

Cycling career
- Sport: Cycling
- Discipline: Road
- Role: Rider

Amateur teams
- 2018: Los Angeles BC
- 2018: SoCalCycling.com
- 2018–2019: Tenis Star Guanajuato
- 2022–2023: Tenis Stars

Professional teams
- 2014–2017: InCycle–Predator Components
- 2020–2021: Crisa–SEEI Pro Cycling

Major wins
- One-day races and Classics National Road Race Championships (2018)

Orlando Trinidad Garibay Contreras (13 October 1993 – 3 November 2023) was a Mexican racing cyclist.

In July 2018, Garibay was Mexican National Road Race Champion with the team Tenis Star Guanajuato. He died in a traffic collision in Sahuayo, on 3 November 2023. He was 30.

== Major results ==
2014
1st Stage 6 Tour of America's Dairyland
2018
1st Road race, National Road Championships
2nd Tour de Murrieta
9th Overall Vuelta Michoacán

1st Stages 2 & 4

2020
5th Road race, National Road Championships
2021
2nd Road race, National Road Championships
