= Héctor Rangel =

Mexican cyclist

Personal information
- Full name: Héctor Hugo Rangel Zamarron
- Born: 20 August 1980 (age 46) Saltillo, Coahuila

Cycling career
- Sport: Cycling
- Discipline: Road
- Role: Rider

Amateur teams
- 2010–2012: Depredadores
- 2013–2014: Canels Turbo
- 2015–2016: Rabbits–Nick López
- 2017–2018: Tennis Stars
- 2019–2020: Rabbits Tamp

Professional teams
- 2005–2008: Tecos de la Universidad Autónoma de Guadalajara
- 2009: Canels–Turbo–Mayordomo

Héctor Hugo Rangel Zamarron (born 20 August 1980) is a Mexican road bicycle racer. He competed at the 2012 Summer Olympics in the Men's road race and finished 38th.

Rangel won the 106-mile (171-kilometre) 2016 Tour de Tucson in a time of 4 hours 10 minutes and 47.12 seconds.

== Major results ==
2006
6th Overall Vuelta a El Salvador
2011
Vuelta a Bolivia

1st Stages 1, 3 & 5

2012
1st Stage 1 Vuelta a Guatemala
1st Stage 5 Vuelta Mexico Telmex
3rd Road race, National Road Championships
3rd Overall Ruta del Centro
9th Time trial, Pan American Road Championships
2013
1st Overall Tucson Bicycle Classic

1st Stage 1

2nd Time trial, National Road Championships
5th Overall Ruta del Centro

1st Stages 3, 4 & 5

2015
3rd Time trial, National Road Championships
