= Petrolike =

Mexican cycling team

Team information
- UCI code: PTL
- Registered: Mexico
- Founded: 2022
- Discipline: Road
- Status: Club (2022); UCI Continental (2023–)
- Bicycles: Bici Coppi

Key personnel
- Team manager: David Plaza

Team name history
- 2022–: Petrolike

Petrolike is a Mexican UCI Continental cycling team founded in 2022.

== Team roster ==
As of 9 February 2024.

Rider	Date of birth
Hernán Aguirre (COL)	13 December 1995 (age 30)
José Aguirre (MEX)	4 January 1994 (age 32)
Edgar Cadena (MEX)	20 November 2000 (age 25)
Jonathan Caicedo (ECU)	28 April 1993 (age 33)
Diego Camargo (COL)	3 May 1998 (age 28)
Cesar Macias (MEX)	17 September 2003 (age 22)
Jorge Fabricio Martinez (MEX)	15 November 2002 (age 23)
Omar Mendoza (COL)	25 November 1989 (age 36)

Rider	Date of birth
José Ramon Muñiz (MEX)	19 April 2002 (age 24)
Juan Carlos Orozco (MEX)	31 August 2002 (age 24)
José Antonio Prieto (MEX)	1 January 2004 (age 22)
Jose Juan Prieto (MEX)	1 January 2004 (age 22)
Cristian Rico (COL)	29 June 2001 (age 25)
Nelson Soto (COL)	19 June 1994 (age 32)
Bernardo Suaza (COL)	28 November 1992 (age 33)
Mauricio Zapata (COL)	16 November 2004 (age 21)

== Major results ==
2023
Mexico National Under-23 Time Trial Championships, José Ramón Muñiz
2024
Overall Vuelta al Táchira, Jonathan Caicedo

Stage 1, Nelson Soto
Stage 4, Jonathan Caicedo

Overall Vuelta Bantrab, Jonathan Caicedo

Stages 2 & 4, Jonathan Caicedo

Stage 6 Vuelta a Colombia, Cristian Rico
Stage 3 Sibiu Cycling Tour, Jonathan Caicedo
Mexico National Road Race Championships, Edgar Cadena
Stage 6 Giro della Regione Friuli Venezia Giulia, Cesar Macias
2025
Ecuador National Under-23 Time Trial Championships, Kevin Navas
Stage 3 Giro d'Abruzzo, Edison Alejandro Callejas
Overall Oberösterreich Rundfahrt, Edgar Cadena

Stage 1, Lorenzo Galimberti
Stage 3, Edgar Cadena

Stage 6 Tour of Magnificent Qinghai, Carlos Alfonso García
