= Flavio de Luna =

Mexican cyclist (born 1990)

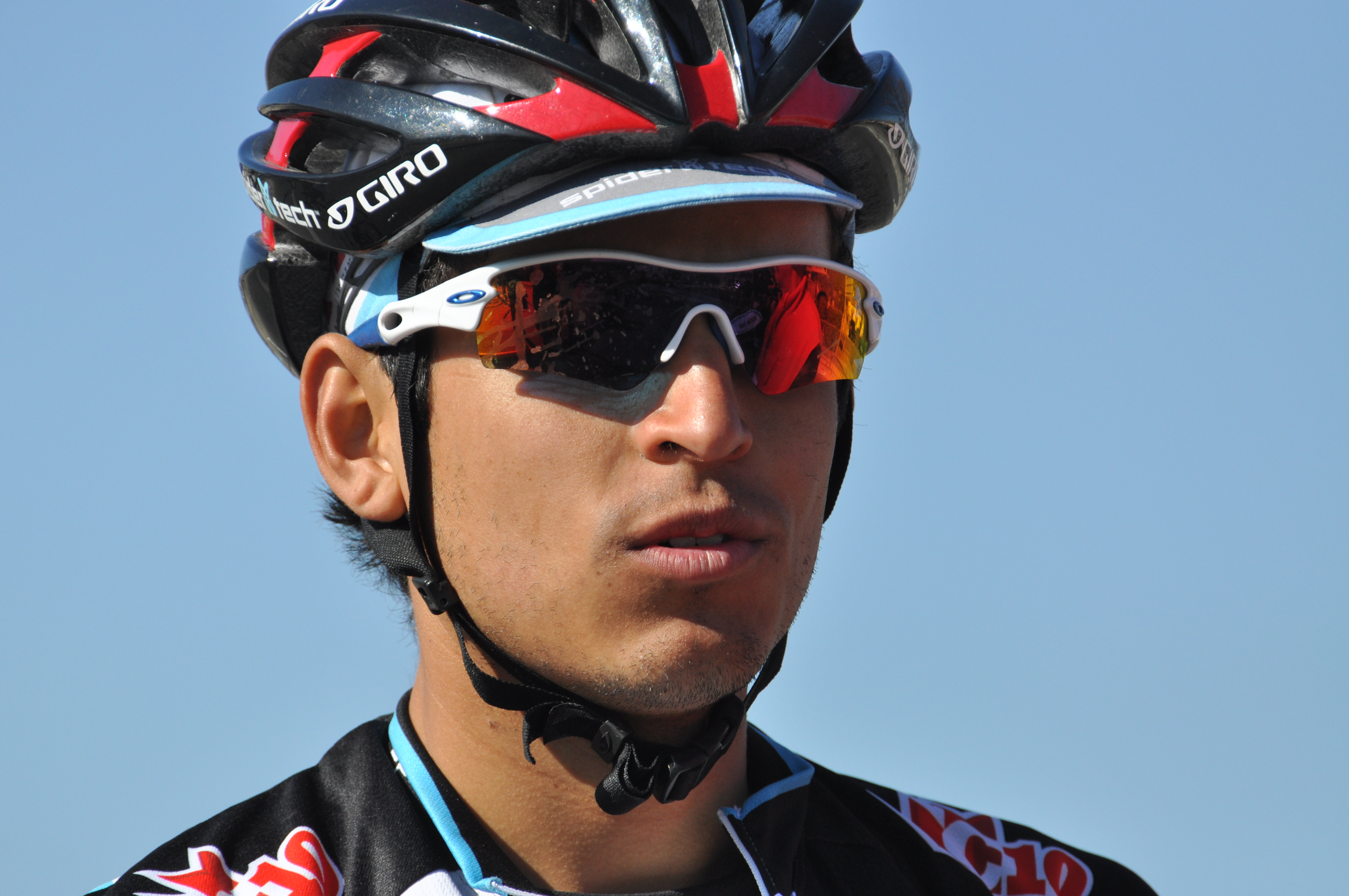
- De Luna at the 2012 Boucles du Sud Ardèche

Personal information
- Full name: Flavio Alejandro de Luna Dávila
- Born: January 26, 1990 (age 36) Aguascalientes City, Mexico

Cycling career
- Sport: Cycling
- Discipline: Road
- Role: Rider
- Rider type: Climber

Amateur teams
- 2017: Stork–CCN
- 2017: Joyerias Meza
- 2019: Rabbits Tamp
- 2021: Aguascalientes

Professional teams
- 2010–2012: SpiderTech–Planet Energy
- 2013–2015: Team Smartstop–Mountain Khakis
- 2016: Team Illuminate
- 2018–2019: 303Project
- 2021: Canel's–Zerouno

Flavio Alejandro de Luna Dávila (born January 26, 1990) is a Mexican cyclist, who last rode for UCI Continental team Canel's–Zerouno.

== Major results ==
2010
1st Stage 5 Vuelta Mexico Telmex
7th Overall Vuelta a la Independencia Nacional
2013
4th Road race, National Road Championships
2014
2nd Time trial, National Road Championships
8th Overall Tour of the Gila
2015
1st Time trial, National Road Championships
2016
4th Road race, National Road Championships
2017
4th Time trial, National Road Championships
2018
4th Time trial, National Road Championships
2021
3rd Road race, National Road Championships
