= Jesús Zárate =

Mexican cyclist (born 1974)

Personal information
- Born: 5 October 1974 (age 52)

Cycling career
- Sport: Cycling
- Current team: Retired
- Discipline: Road
- Role: Rider

Professional teams
- 1999–2000: Mercury Cycling Team
- 2002: Mercury Cycling Team
- 2006–2007: Tecos de la Universidad Autónoma de Guadalajara
- 2009: Tecos de la Universidad Autónoma de Guadalajara
Medal record
Representing Mexico
Pan American Games
Silver medal – second place	1995 Mar del Plata	Road time trial
Central American and Caribbean Games
Silver medal – second place	1993 Ponce	Road time trial team

Jesús Zárate (born 5 October 1974) is a Mexican former professional cyclist. He competed in the men's time trial at the 1996 Summer Olympics.

== Major results ==
1993
2nd Team time trial, Central American and Caribbean Games
1998
1st Road race, National Road Championships
1st Stage 1 Vuelta y Ruta de Mexico
1999
5th First Union Invitational
2001
1st Stage 3 Tour of the Gila
2002
10th San Francisco Grand Prix
2003
2nd Time trial, National Road Championships
2005
1st Stage 8 Vuelta Ciclista a Costa Rica
2006
2nd Overall Vuelta a Chihuahua
2007
1st Stage 8 Vuelta a Cuba
