= Crisa–SEEI Pro Cycling =

Mexican cycling team

Team information
- UCI code: CRS
- Registered: Mexico
- Founded: 2020
- Discipline: Road
- Status: UCI Continental

Key personnel
- Team manager: Luis Fernando Macias Hernandez

Team name history
- 2020–: Crisa–SEEI Pro Cycling

Crisa–SEEI Pro Cycling is a Mexican UCI Continental cycling team founded in 2020.

== Team roster ==
As of 2 December 2020.

| Rider | Date of birth |
|---|---|
| José Aguirre (MEX) | 4 January 1994 (age 32) |
| Miguel Luis Álvarez (MEX) | 30 December 1987 (age 38) |
| Orlando Garibay (MEX) | 13 October 1993 (age 32) |
| Carlos Manuel Hernandez (MEX) | 12 January 1998 (age 28) |
| Edibaldo Maldonado (MEX) | 27 April 1993 (age 33) |

| Rider | Date of birth |
|---|---|
| José Alfredo Santoyo (MEX) | 15 April 1995 (age 31) |
| Gilberto Santoyo (MEX) | 3 February 1997 (age 29) |
| Ignacio Sarabia (MEX) | 15 July 1983 (age 43) |
| Uriel Sarabia (MEX) | 31 January 1995 (age 31) |
| Luis Francisco Villa (MEX) | 15 August 1998 (age 28) |
