= Verónica Leal =

Mexican cyclist (born 1977)

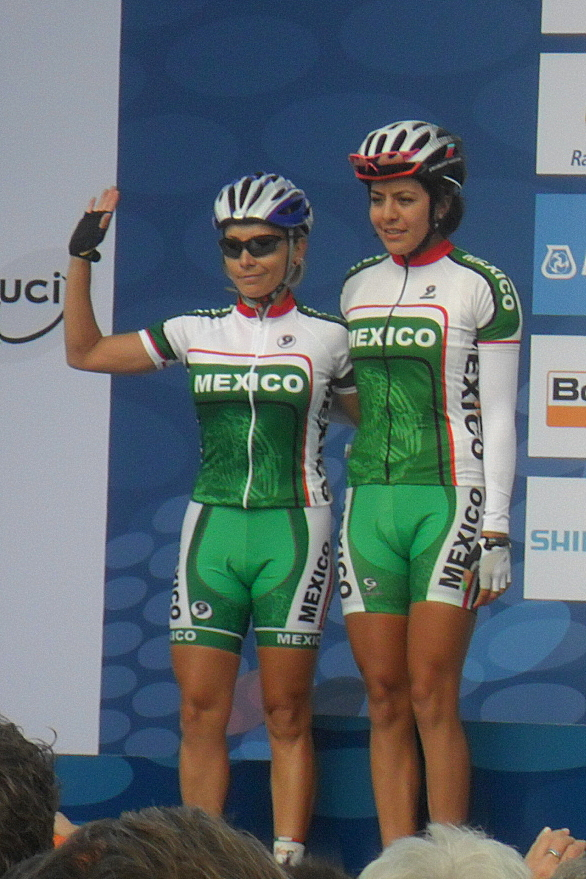
- Leal (left) at the 2012 UCI Road World Championships

Personal information
- Full name: Claudia Verónica Leal Balderas
- Born: 15 October 1977 (age 49) Mexico

Cycling career
- Sport: Cycling
- Discipline: Road
- Role: Rider

Amateur teams
- 2009: Team Type 1
- 2015: BMW p/b Happy Tooth Dental (guest)
- 2017–2018: Conade–Visit México–Specialized
- 2019: Durango–Specialized–IED

Professional teams
- 2006: Saccarelli–Emu–Marsciano
- 2007: A.S. Team FRW
- 2008: Gauss RDZ Ormu
- 2010–2012: SC Michela Fanini Record Rox

Major wins
- One-day races National Time Trial Championships (2009–2011, 2014, 2016) National Road Race Championships (2009–2010)
Medal record
Women's road bicycle racing
Representing Mexico
Pan American Championships
Bronze medal – third place	2009 Hidalgo	Road race

Claudia Verónica Leal Balderas (born 15 October 1977) is a Mexican road cyclist. She participated at the UCI Road World Championships on ten occasions between 2004 and 2014.

== Major results ==
2000
3rd Road race, National Road Championships
2001
3rd Time trial, National Road Championships
2004
4th Time trial, Pan American Road Championships
2007
6th Overall Tour Cycliste Féminin International de l'Ardèche
7th Overall Giro della Toscana Int. Femminile – Memorial Michela Fanini
2008
1st Stage 6 Vuelta a El Salvador
2nd Time trial, National Road Championships
7th Time trial, Pan American Road Championships
2009
National Road Championships

1st Road race
1st Time trial

2010
National Road Championships

1st Road race
1st Time trial

2011
1st Time trial, National Road Championships
Pan American Games

6th Time trial
10th Road race

8th Time trial, Pan American Road Championships
2012
7th Time trial, Pan American Road Championships
10th Grand Prix el Salvador
2013
2nd Time trial, National Road Championships
2014
1st Time trial, National Road Championships
2015
2nd Time trial, National Road Championships
2016
1st Time trial, National Road Championships
2017
2nd Time trial, National Road Championships
2021
2nd Time trial, National Road Championships
