= Juan Pablo Magallanes =

Mexican bicycle racer

Personal information
- Full name: Juan Pablo Magallanes Aranda
- Born: 6 February 1982 (age 44) León, Guanajuato, Mexico

Cycling career
- Sport: Cycling
- Current team: Tenis Stars
- Discipline: Road
- Role: Rider

Amateur teams
- 2010: Rock Racing
- 2012–: Tenis Stars–Code Guanajuato

Professional teams
- 2004: Saeco (stagiaire)
- 2005–2006: Androni Giocattoli–3C Casalinghi
- 2007–2009: Tecos de la Universidad Autónoma de Guadalajara
- 2011: Movistar Continental Team
Medal record
Men's road bicycle racing
Representing Mexico
Pan American Championships
Bronze medal – third place	2015 León	Road race

Juan Pablo Magallanes Aranda (born 6 February 1982) is a Mexican cyclist.

== Major results ==
2003
9th Gran Premio Industrie del Marmo
2004
2nd Gran Premio della Liberazione
2nd Gran Premio Industrie del Marmo
4th Trofeo Banca Popolare di Vicenza
8th Giro del Belvedere
2005
5th Overall Volta ao Alentejo
2006
1st Stage 5 Vuelta a Chihuahua
2007
National Road Championships

1st Road race
1st Time trial

Vuelta a El Salvador

1st Points classification
1st Stage 3

1st Stage 10 Vuelta a Colombia
10th Overall Tour de Beauce
2008
2nd Time trial, National Road Championships
7th Overall Vuelta a Chihuahua
2009
1st Stage 1 Vuelta Mexico Telmex
3rd Road race, National Road Championships
8th Overall Doble Sucre Potosí GP Cemento Fancesa
2012
1st Stage 2 Ruta del Centro
2013
Vuelta a Guatemala

1st Stages 1 & 4

2nd Overall Ruta del Centro

1st Stage 6

5th Road race, Pan American Road Championships
2014
10th Road race, Central American and Caribbean Games
2015
1st Overall Tucson Bicycle Classic
2nd Time trial, National Road Championships
3rd Road race, Pan American Road Championships
2016
1st Time trial, National Road Championships
1st Prologue Ruta del Centro
2020
3rd Time trial, National Road Championships
