= Ariadna Gutiérrez (cyclist) =

Mexican cyclist

Personal information
- Full name: Ariadna Gutiérrez Arzaluz
- Born: 22 August 1991 (age 35) Huixquilucan, Mexico

Cycling career
- Sport: Cycling
- Current team: A.R. Monex
- Discipline: Road
- Role: Rider

Professional teams
- 2018–2020: Swapit–Agolíco
- 2021–: A.R. Monex
Medal record
Women's road bicycle racing
Representing Mexico
Pan American Championships
Gold medal – first place	2019 Ixmiquilpan	Road race

Ariadna Gutiérrez Arzaluz (born 22 August 1991) is a Mexican professional racing cyclist, who currently rides for UCI Women's Continental Team A.R. Monex.

On 3 May 2019 she won the Pan American Road Cycling Championship. On 30 July 2019 she won the Mexican Road Race Championships in the category Elite.

== Major results ==
2018
2nd Road race, National Road Championships
5th Overall Vuelta Internacional Femenina a Costa Rica
8th Overall Vuelta a Colombia Femenina Oro y Paz
2019
1st Road race, Pan American Road Championships
2nd Road race, National Road Championships
2020
10th Overall Women's Herald Sun Tour
