= Mexican Cycling Federation =

National governing body of cycle racing in Mexico

Federación Mexicana de Ciclismo
- Sport: Cycle racing
- Abbreviation: FMC
- Founded: 1976
- Affiliation: UCI
- Regional affiliation: COPACI
- Headquarters: The CONADE are located in Mexico City, Mexico.
- President: Edgardo Hernández Chagoya
- Secretary: Guillermo Armando Gutierrez Molina

Official website
- www.federacionmexicanadeciclismo.com.mx
- (Mexico)

The Mexican Cycling Federation (in Spanish: Federación Mexicana de Ciclismo, FMC) was the national governing body of cycle racing in Mexico until 2025.

It covers the disciplines of road racing, track cycling, cyclo-cross, BMX, mountain biking and cycle speedway.

It is a Member of the UCI, Confederacion Panamericana de Ciclismo, Confederación Deportiva Mexicana (CODEME) and The Mexican Olympic Committee (Spanish: Comité Olímpico Mexicano) (COM).

In 2021, the UCI suspended the FMC for infringements regarding governance and electoral processes. This suspension was confirmed at the 2022 UCI Congress. In 2025, after the FMC had proved unable to implement the demanded reforms, the UCI congress excluded the FMC and admitted a new Mexican federation under the name Unión Ciclista de México.

== See also ==
- Vuelta Mexico Telmex
- Orven (Cycling Team)
