= Ignacio Sarabia =

Mexican bicycle racer

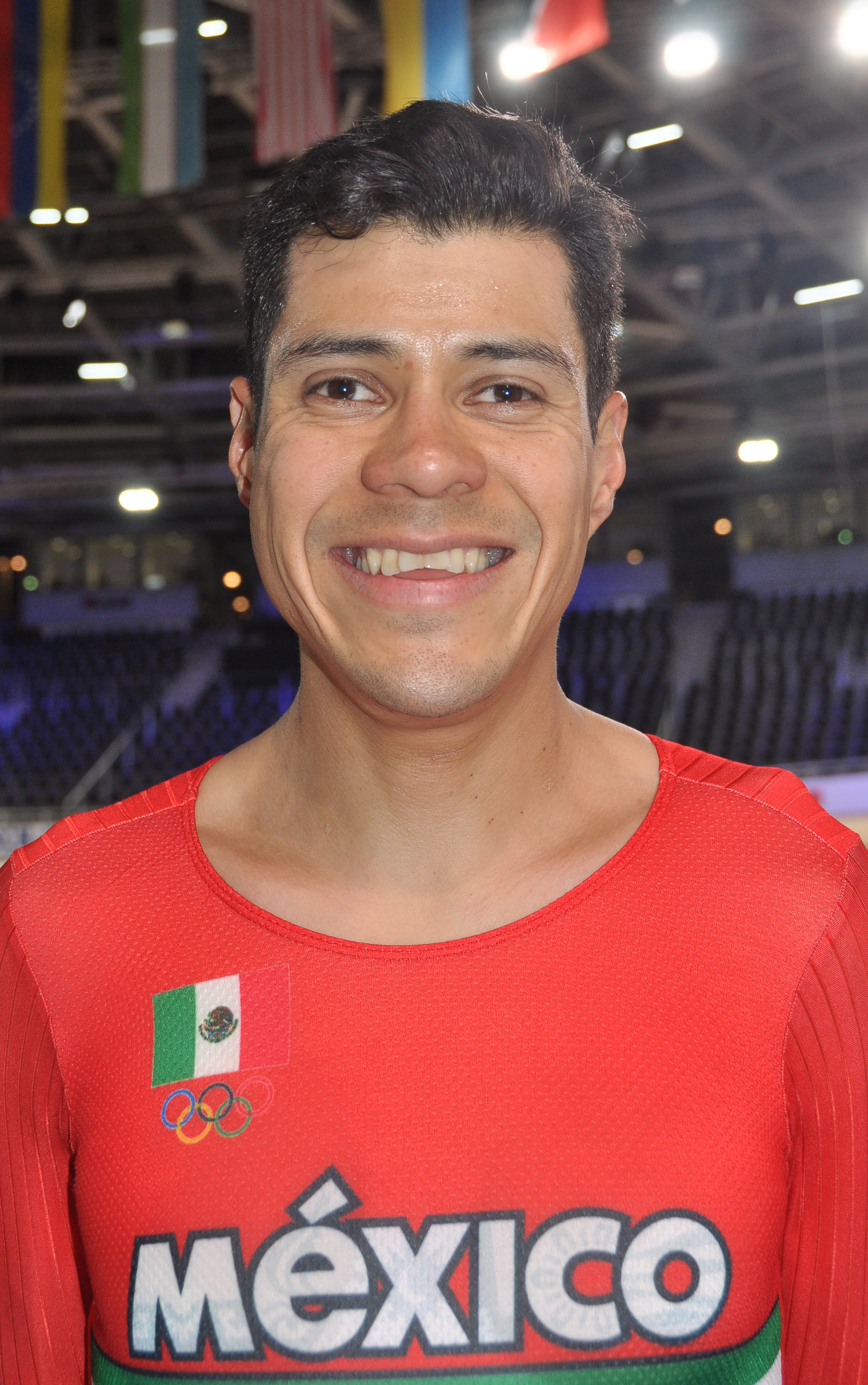
- Sarabia in 2020

Personal information
- Full name: Ignacio Sarabia Díaz
- Born: 15 July 1983 (age 43) Mexico City, Mexico

Cycling career
- Sport: Cycling
- Current team: Jagafa
- Disciplines: Road; Track
- Role: Rider

Amateur teams
- 2010: Rock Racing
- 2013–2015: Depredadores Chetumal
- 2021: Crisa–SEEI
- 2022: Tenis Stars
- 2022–: Mani Zabala–Jagafa

Professional teams
- 2006–2008: Extremadura–Spiuk
- 2009: Tecos Trek UAG
- 2011–2012: Movistar Continental Team
- 2015–2018: Inteja–MMR Dominican Cycling Team
- 2020: Crisa–SEEI Pro Cycling
Medal record
Representing Mexico
Men's Track cycling
Pan American Championships
Gold medal – first place	2019 Cochabamba	Madison
Silver medal – second place	2018 Aguascalientes	Madison
Silver medal – second place	2019 Cochabamba	Points race
Bronze medal – third place	2018 Aguascalientes	Team pursuit
Central American and Caribbean Games
Gold medal – first place	2018 Barranquilla	Madison
Gold medal – first place	2018 Barranquilla	Points race
Gold medal – first place	2018 Barranquilla	Team pursuit
Silver medal – second place	2010 Mayagüez	Madison
Silver medal – second place	2014 Veracruz	Omnium
Silver medal – second place	2014 Veracruz	Team pursuit
Bronze medal – third place	2002 San Salvador	Team pursuit
Bronze medal – third place	2010 Mayagüez	Team pursuit
Men's road bicycle racing
Pan American Championships
Silver medal – second place	2013 Zacatecas	Road race
Silver medal – second place	2013 Zacatecas	Time trial

Ignacio Sarabia Díaz (born 15 July 1983) is a Mexican racing cyclist, who rides for Mexican amateur team Jagafa.

== Major results ==
=== Track ===
2002
3rd Team pursuit, Pan American Track Championships
3rd Team pursuit, Central American and Caribbean Games
2010
Central American and Caribbean Games

2nd Madison
3rd Team pursuit

2014
Central American and Caribbean Games

2nd Omnium
2nd Team pursuit

2018
Central American and Caribbean Games

1st Madison
1st Points race
1st Team pursuit

Pan American Track Championships

2nd Madison
3rd Team pursuit

2019
Pan American Track Championships

1st Madison
2nd Points race

=== Road ===
2007
8th Overall Circuito Montañés
2008
6th Circuito de Getxo
9th Overall Troféu Joaquim Agostinho
9th Overall Vuelta Mexico Telmex
9th Subida a Urkiola
2009
1st Time trial, National Road Championships
4th Overall Vuelta Mexico Telmex
2010
2nd Time trial, National Road Championships
5th Overall Vuelta Mexico Telmex

1st Stages 3 & 6

7th Time trial, Pan American Road Championships
2011
1st Stage 2 Vuelta a Boyacá
2012
Ruta del Centro

1st Stages 5, 6 & 8

2013
1st Points classification, Ruta del Centro
Pan American Road Championships

2nd Road race
2nd Time trial

2014
National Road Championships

1st Road race
3rd Time trial

2015
1st Stage 2 Vuelta Mexico Telmex
2nd Road race, National Road Championships
2018
1st Stage 8a Tour de Guadeloupe
2021
4th Road race, National Road Championships
