= Marcela Prieto =

Mexican cyclist (born 1992)

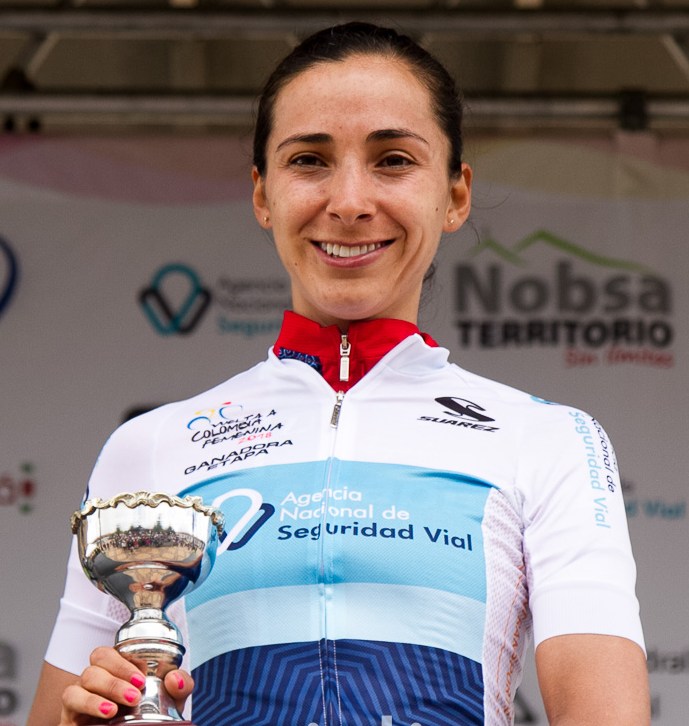
- Prieto in 2018

Personal information
- Full name: Marcela Elizabeth Prieto Castañeda
- Born: 11 March 1992 (age 34) Aguascalientes City, Mexico

Cycling career
- Sport: Cycling
- Current team: PatoBike–BMC
- Discipline: Road
- Role: Rider
- Rider type: Puncheur

Amateur teams
- 2017: Conade–Visit México–Specialized
- 2021–: PatoBike–BMC

Professional teams
- 2014: Estado de México–Faren Kuota
- 2018–2020: Swapit–Agolíco

Marcela Elizabeth Prieto Castañeda (born 11 March 1992) is a Mexican racing cyclist, who most recently rode for Mexican amateur team PatoBike–BMC.

== Major results ==
2015
3rd Road race, National Road Championships
2017
3rd Road race, National Road Championships
2018
1st Overall Vuelta Femenina a Guatemala

1st Stage 2

1st Gran Premio Comite Olimpico Nacional Femenino
2nd Overall Vuelta Internacional Femenina a Costa Rica
3rd Overall Vuelta a Colombia Femenina

1st Stage 4

3rd Gran Premio ICODER
7th Overall Tour of the Gila
10th Overall Tour of California
2019
1st Overall Vuelta Tica Internacional

1st Stage 1 & 2

4th Clásica CRC 506
7th Overall Joe Martin Stage Race
10th Clásica Esencial Costa Rica
2022
7th Overall Tour of the Gila
2023
2nd Overall Tour of the Gila

1st Stage 1

7th Overall Vuelta Femenina a Guatemala
