= Brenda Santoyo =

Mexican cyclist

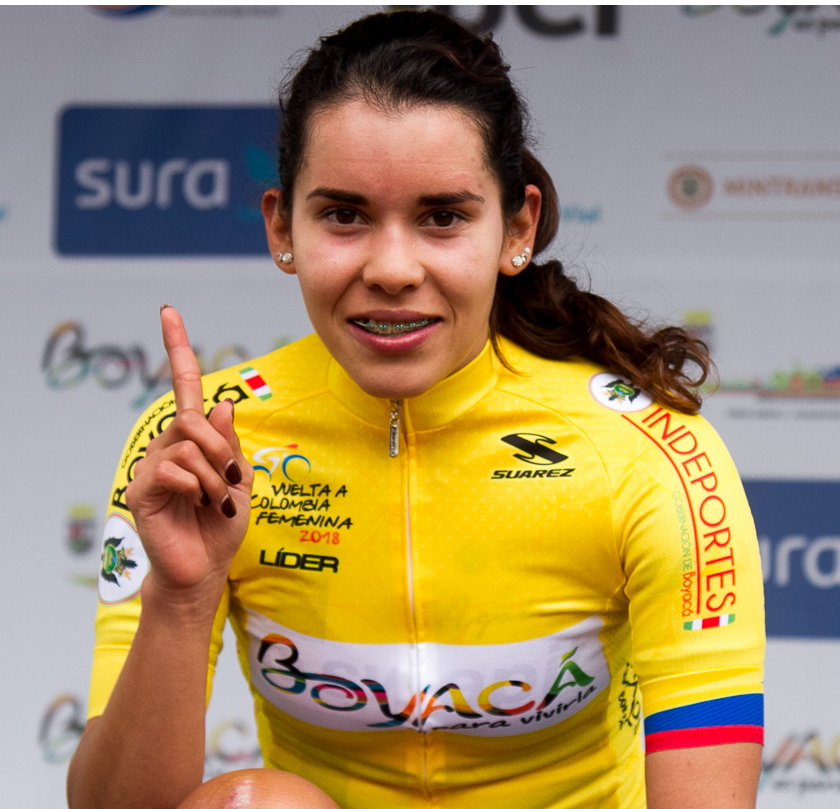
- Santoyo in 2018.

Personal information
- Full name: Brenda Andrea Santoyo Pérez
- Born: 17 August 1996 (age 30) Mexico

Cycling career
- Sport: Cycling
- Discipline: Road
- Role: Rider

Amateur team
- 2017: World Cycling Centre

Professional team
- 2018–2019: Swapit–Agolíco

Major wins
- One day races & Classics National Road Race Championships (2018)
Medal record
Women's track cycling
Representing Mexico
Pan American Championships
Silver medal – second place	2018 Aguascalientes	Team pursuit

Brenda Andrea Santoyo Pérez (born August 17, 1996) is a Mexican road bicycle racer, who last rode for UCI Women's Team Swapit–Agolíco.

== Major results ==
2013
3rd Overall Volta do México Copa Governador

2014
3rd Aguascalientes – Copa Ciclista PRI
4th San Louis – Copa Ciclista PRI

2016
1st Martigny–Mauvoisin
3rd Kriterium Riehen
4th Grand Prix Olten
4th Ceignes
7th Road race, National Road Championships
8th Thun-West (ITT)

2017
1st Prix du Saugeais
3rd L'Enfer du Chablais
4th Berner Rundfahrt
6th Grand Prix Crevoisier–Tour de la Courtine
9th Critérium de Montreux

2018
National Road Championships

1st Road race
2nd Time trial

1st Overall La Vuelta Yucatan–MZ Tour

1st Stages 1, 2 & 3 (ITT)

2nd Overall Tucson Bicycle Classic
3rd Gran Premio Comite Olimpico Nacional Femenino
4th Overall Vuelta Internacional Femenina a Costa Rica

1st Mountains classification
1st Stage 1

5th Overall Vuelta a Colombia Femenina

1st Stage 1

7th Overall Vuelta Femenina a Guatemala

1st Stage 1

8th Copa Federacion de Ruta Aguascalientes
9th Gran Premio ICODER
