= Eduardo Graciano =

Mexican cyclist

Personal information
- Born: 13 March 1967 (age 59)

Cycling career
- Sport: Cycling
- Current team: Retired
- Discipline: Road
- Role: Rider

Eduardo Graciano (born 13 March 1967) is a Mexican cyclist. He competed in the men's individual road race at the 1996 Summer Olympics.

== Major results ==
1991
1st Stages 8 & 11 Vuelta y Ruta de Mexico
1999
1st Road race, National Road Championships
1st Stage 1a Vuelta Mexico Telmex
2000
1st Time trial, National Road Championships
1st Stage 1 Vuelta al Táchira
2002
1st Time trial, National Road Championships
2003
1st Time trial, National Road Championships
