= Cooper Johnson =

American baseball player (born 1998)

Free agent
- Catcher
- Born: April 25, 1998 (age 28); Los Angeles, California, U.S.
- Bats: Right Throws: Right

Cooper Allen Johnson (born April 25, 1998) is an American professional baseball catcher who is a free agent.

== Amateur career ==
Cooper attended Carmel High School in Mundelein, Illinois. Johnson played in the 2015 Under Armour All-America Baseball Game. Johnson played for the United States national under-18 baseball team and won a gold medal with them at the 2015 U-18 Baseball World Cup. He was a top rated draft prospect for the 2016 MLB draft, ranked number 33rd overall by ESPN's Keith Law. Johnson was drafted by the Cincinnati Reds in the 28th round but did not sign and choose to attend the University of Mississippi to play college baseball for the Rebels. Johnson spent the 2017, 2018, and 2019 seasons at Ole Miss. His best season came as a junior in 2019, hitting .271/.371/.449 with eight home runs and 32 RBI. In 2017, he played collegiate summer baseball with the Orleans Firebirds and Yarmouth–Dennis Red Sox of the Cape Cod Baseball League, and returned to the league in 2018 with the Bourne Braves.

== Professional career ==
=== Detroit Tigers ===
Johnson was selected by the Detroit Tigers in the 6th round (172nd overall) of the 2019 Major League Baseball draft and signed with them for a $291,400 signing bonus. He split the 2019 season between the Connecticut Tigers and the West Michigan Whitecaps, hitting a combined .198/.333/.298 with two home runs and 17 RBI. Johnson did not play in a game in 2020 due to the cancellation of the minor league season because of the COVID-19 pandemic.

Johnson split the 2021 season between West Michigan and the Lakeland Flying Tigers, hitting a combined .199/.333/.303 with three home runs and 31 RBI. He split the 2022 season between West Michigan and the Erie SeaWolves, hitting a combined .160/.282/.223 with one home run and 4 RBI. He was released on August 15, 2022.

=== Texas Rangers ===
On February 3, 2023, Johnson signed a minor league contract with the Texas Rangers organization. He split the 2023 season between the Hickory Crawdads of the High-A South Atlantic League and the Frisco RoughRiders of the Double-A Texas League, hitting a combined .206/.331/.328 with three home runs and 13 RBI. Johnson spent the 2024 season with Frisco, hitting .235/.355/.474 with 14 home runs and 46 RBI.

Johnson opened the 2025 campaign split between Frisco and the Round Rock Express of the Triple-A Pacific Coast League. In 100 appearances for the two affiliates, he batted a cumulative .219/.329/.351 with nine home runs, 40 RBI, and four stolen bases. Johnson elected free agency following the season on November 6, 2025.

On November 20, 2025, Johnson re-signed with the Rangers on a minor league contract. On July 2, 2026, Johnson was released by the Rangers organization. However, he re–signed with Texas on a new minor league contract the following day. He elected free agency on November 2.
