= Ana Teresa Casas =

Mexican cyclist (born 1991)

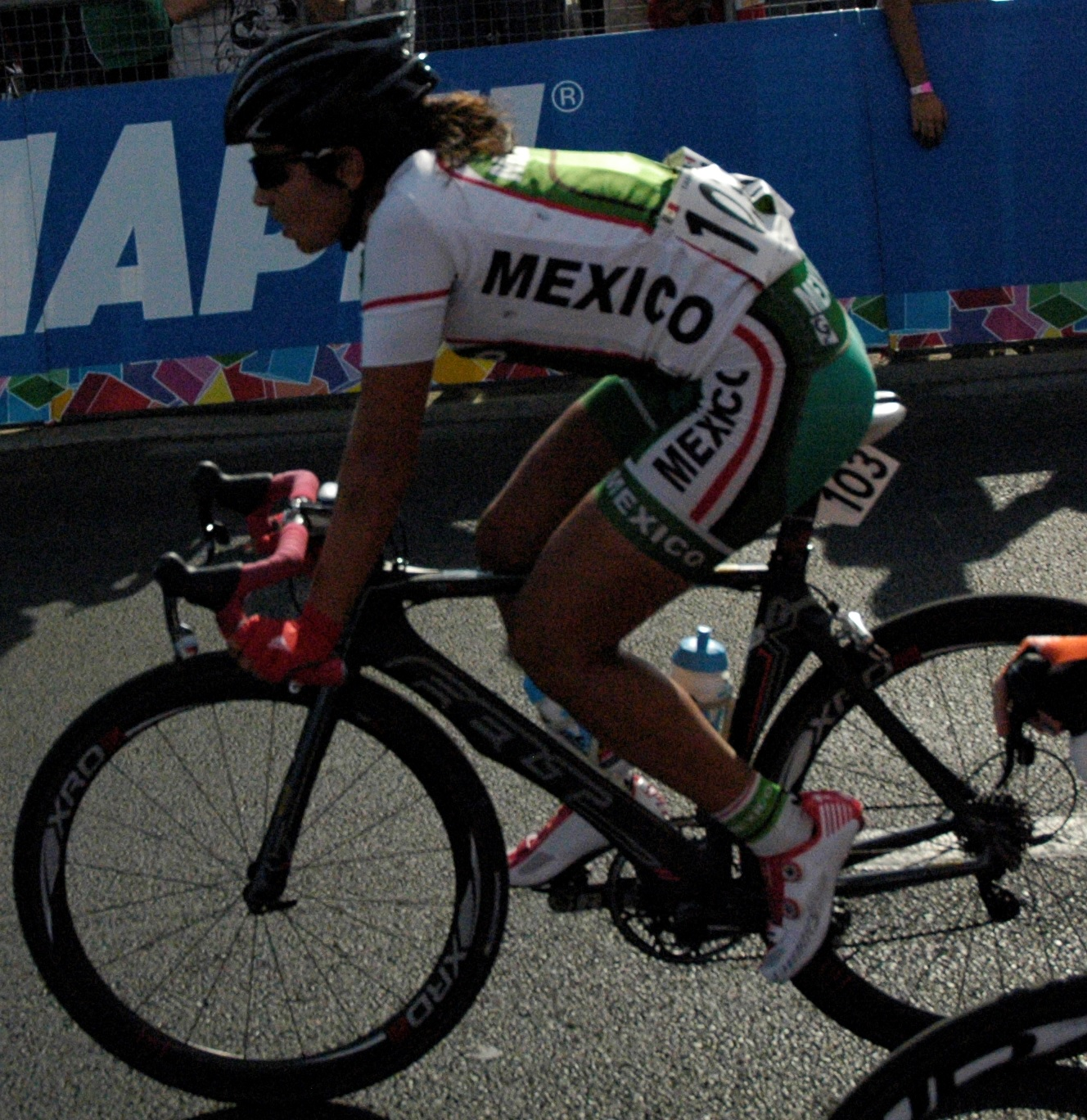
- Casas at the 2013 UCI Road World Championships

Personal information
- Full name: Ana Teresa Casas Bonilla
- Born: 8 November 1991 (age 34) Mexico City, Mexico

Cycling career
- Sport: Cycling
- Current team: CWA Racing p/b Goldman Sachs ETFs
- Disciplines: Road; Track
- Role: Rider

Amateur teams
- 2017: Unidas Por Mexico–Liv
- 2019–: Capital Wealth Advisors p/b Trek

Professional teams
- 2014: Estado de México–Faren Kuota
- 2018: Swapit–Agolíco
Medal record
Women's track cycling
Representing Mexico
Pan American Championships
Silver medal – second place	2018 Aguascalientes	Team pursuit

Ana Teresa Casas Bonilla (born 8 November 1991) is a Mexican racing cyclist, who rides for American amateur team CWA Racing p/b Goldman Sachs ETFs. She competed in the 2013 UCI women's time trial and 2013 UCI women's road race in Florence.

== Personal life ==
Casas is married to fellow cyclist, Ignacio Prado.

== Major results ==
2010
2nd Road race, National Road Championships
2011
2nd Road race, National Road Championships
4th Road race, Pan American Games
2012
2nd Time trial, National Road Championships
Pan American Road Championships

9th Time trial
10th Road race

2013
National Road Championships

2nd Road race
3rd Time trial

6th Road race, Pan American Road Championships
9th Overall Vuelta Internacional Femenina a Costa Rica
2014
National Road Championships

1st Road race
2nd Time trial

8th Time trial, Pan American Road Championships
2015
3rd Time trial, National Road Championships
3rd Overall Vuelta Internacional Femenina a Costa Rica

1st Stage 2

2016
10th Gran Prix San Luis Femenino
2018
2nd Team pursuit, Pan American Track Championships
2020
2nd Road race, National Road Championships
