= Edibaldo Maldonado =

Mexican cyclist (born 1993)

Personal information
- Full name: Edibaldo Maldonado Rayas
- Born: 27 April 1993 (age 33)

Cycling career
- Sport: Cycling
- Current team: Crisa–SEEI
- Disciplines: Track; Road
- Role: Rider
- Rider type: Pursuitist (track)

Professional team
- 2020–: Crisa–SEEI Pro Cycling
Medal record
Men's track cycling
Representing Mexico
Pan American Championships
Silver medal – second place	2021 Lima	Team pursuit
Silver medal – second place	2024 Carson	Madison
Bronze medal – third place	2013 Mexico City	Team pursuit
Bronze medal – third place	2018 Aguascalientes	Team pursuit
Bronze medal – third place	2021 Lima	Individual pursuit
Bronze medal – third place	2022 Lima	Team pursuit

Edibaldo Maldonado Rayas (born 27 April 1993) is a Mexican track and road cyclist, who currently rides for UCI Continental team Crisa–SEEI. He competed in the individual pursuit at the 2014 UCI Track Cycling World Championships.
