= PatoBike–BMC =

Mexican cycling team

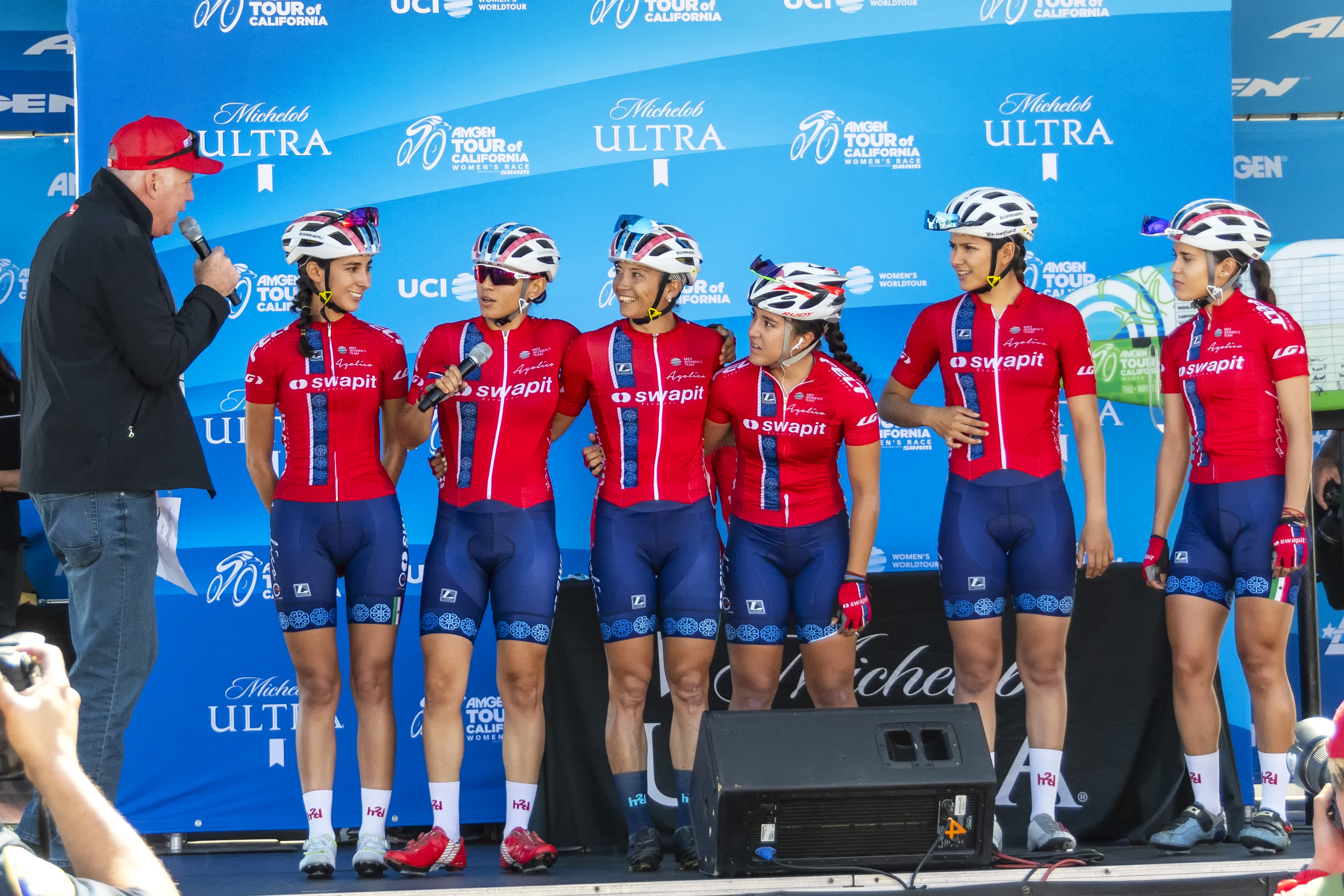

Team information
- UCI code: AGO
- Registered: Mexico
- Founded: 2018
- Discipline: Road
- Status: UCI Women's Team (2018–2020); National (2021–)
- Bicycles: BMC

Team name history
- 2018–2019 2020 2021–: Swapit–Agolico (SWA); Agolico (AGO); PatoBike–BMC

PatoBike–BMC is a women's professional road bicycle racing team which participates in elite women's races.

== Team roster ==
As of 10 June 2020.

Rider	Date of birth
Yareli Acevedo (MEX)	29 July 2001 (age 25)
Denisse Ahumada (CHI)	8 April 1993 (age 33)
Anet Barrera (MEX)	9 September 1998 (age 27)
Maria Gaxiola (MEX)	20 May 1997 (age 29)
Ariadna Gutiérrez (MEX)	22 August 1991 (age 35)

Rider	Date of birth
Julieta Lledias (MEX)	16 April 2001 (age 25)
Jennifer Morales (CRC)	26 August 1997 (age 29)
Marcela Prieto (MEX)	11 March 1992 (age 34)
Andrea Ramírez (MEX)	25 September 1999 (age 26)
María José Vargas (CRC)	15 February 1996 (age 30)

== Major results ==
2018
Copa Federacion de Ruta Aguascalientes, Lizbeth Yareli Salazar
Stage 3 Tucson Bicycle Classic, Paola Muñoz
Overall La Vuelta Yucatán–MZ Tour, Brenda Andrea Santoyo

Prologue, Lizbeth Yareli Salazar
Stages 1, 2 & 3 (ITT), Brenda Andrea Santoyo
Stage 4, Paola Muñoz

Overall Vuelta Femenina a Guatemala, Brenda Andrea Santoyo

Stage 1, Brenda Andrea Santoyo
Stage 2, Marcela Prieto
Stage 4, Paola Muñoz

Points classification Vuelta a Colombia Femenina, Marcela Prieto

Youth classification, Marcela Prieto
Stage 1, Brenda Andrea Santoyo
Stage 4, Marcela Prieto

Gran Premio ICODER, Maria José Vargas
Gran Premio Comite Olimpico Nacional Femenino, Marcela Elizabeth Prieto
Points classification Vuelta Internacional Femenina a Costa Rica, Maria José Vargas

Youth classification, Maria José Vargas
Mountains classification, Brenda Andrea Santoyo
Stage 1, Brenda Andrea Santoyo
Stage 3, Maria José Vargas

2019
Stage 3 Joe Martin Stage Race, Andrea Ramírez
Central American Championship, Road Race, Maria José Vargas Barrientos
Youth classification Vuelta Femenina a Guatemala, Andrea Ramírez
Clásica CRC 506, Andrea Ramírez
Clásica Esencial Costa Rica, Andrea Ramírez
Overall Vuelta Tica Internacional, Marcela Prieto

Stages 1 & 2 (ITT), Marcela Prieto
Stage 3, Brenda Andrea Santoyo

2020
Team classification Women's Herald Sun Tour

== National Championships ==
2018
Costa Rica Time Trial, Maria José Vargas
Costa Rica Road Race, Maria José Vargas
Mexico Road Race, Brenda Andrea Santoyo

2019
Pan American Championships Road Race, Ariadna Gutiérrez
Mexico Time Trial, Andrea Ramírez
Costa Rica Time Trial, Maria José Vargas
Mexico Road Race, category Under 23, Anet Barrera
Mexico Road Race, category Elite, Ariadna Gutiérrez
