= IRT Racing =

Team information
- UCI code: IRT
- Registered: United States
- Founded: 2015
- Disbanded: 2015
- Discipline: Road
- Status: UCI Continental

Team name history
- 2015: IRT Racing

iRT Racing was an American UCI Continental cycling team established in 2015.
