= Gran Premio Comite Olimpico Nacional Femenino =

Annual professional road bicycle race in Costa Rica

Race details
- Date: October
- Region: Costa Rica
- Discipline: Road
- Competition: UCI 1.2 (2018)
- Type: One day race
- Web site: fecoci.net

History
- First edition: 2018
- Editions: 1 (as of 2018)
- First winner: Marcela Prieto (MEX)
- Most wins: No repeat winners
- Most recent: Marcela Prieto (MEX)

The Gran Premio Comite Olimpico Nacional Femenino was an annual professional road bicycle race for women in Costa Rica.

== Winners ==
Year	Country	Rider	Team
2018	Mexico	Marcela Prieto	Swapit–Agolico
