= Uri Martins =

Mexican cyclist

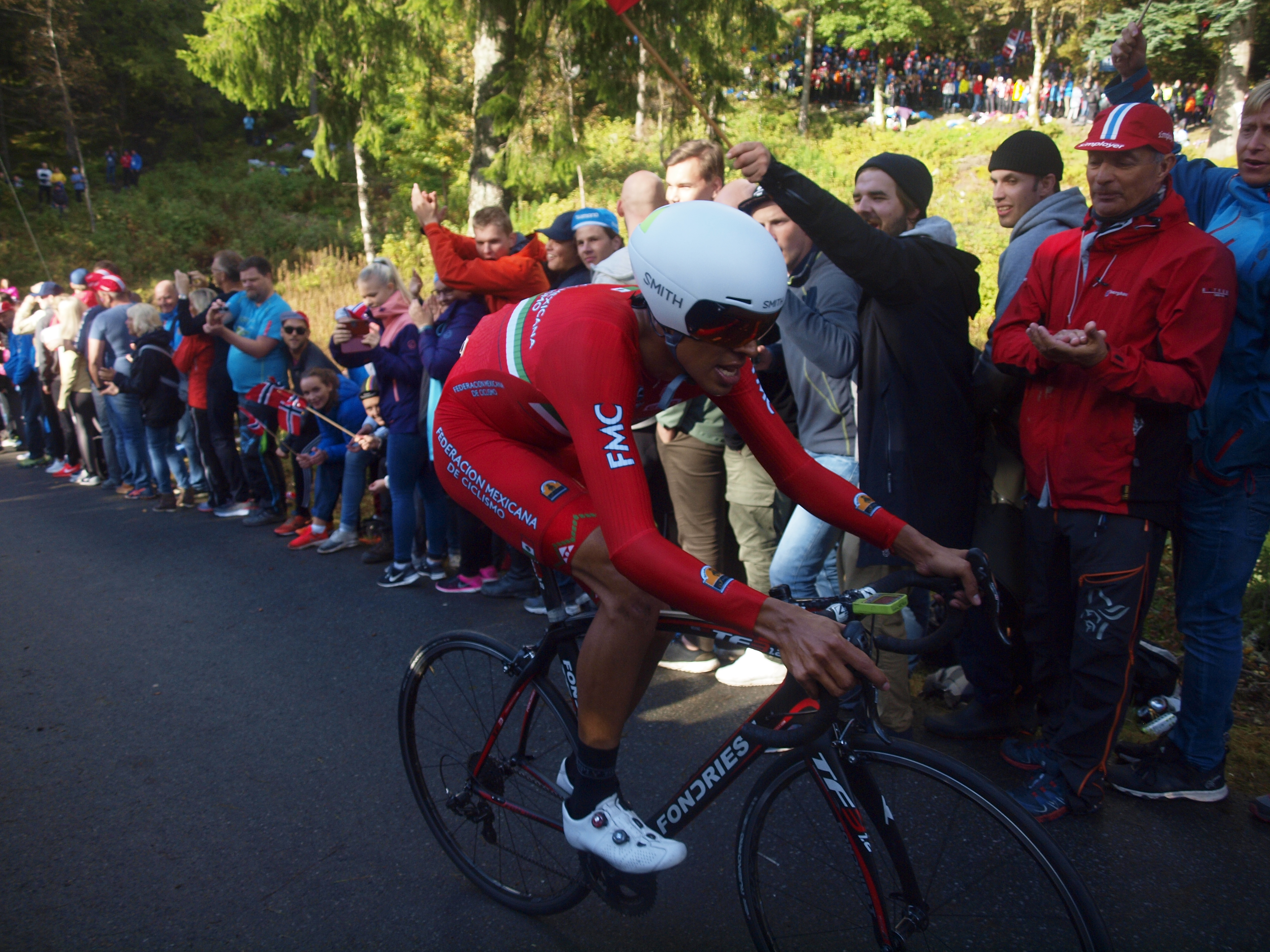
- Martins in 2017

Personal information
- Full name: Uri Martins Sandoval
- Born: August 7, 1990 (age 36) Cuernavaca, Morelos, Mexico
- Height: 1.86 m (6 ft 1 in)
- Weight: 70 kg (154 lb)

Cycling career
- Sport: Cycling
- Current team: Retired
- Discipline: Road
- Role: Rider

Amateur team
- 2011: San Marcos

Professional team
- 2012–2017: Amore & Vita

Uri Martins Sandoval, born on August 7, 1990, in Cuernavaca (State of Morelos), is a former Mexican professional cyclist and the current chief executive officer of Grand Tours Project, a Swiss company recognized as one of the world's leading cycling tour operators. Uri was a member of the Amore & Vita pro cycling team from 2012 to 2017.

== Biography ==
Uri's path to leadership began with a deep passion for cycling. As a young boy in Mexico, he won his first bicycle in a design contest called "Idea your future", igniting a dream that would carry him through 16 years of competitive cycling, including six as a professional cyclist racing in Europe, Asia and the Americas for an Italian pro team.

He became a two-time Mexican National Champion in Road Cycling, competed in three UCI Road World Championships.

Alongside his athletic career, Uri founded Mexico's youth cycling academy in 2014, UFLP Pro Performance team, promoting science-based training, international exchange with Europe, and values-driven development.

After retiring from professional cycling in 2017, Uri transitioned into business, bringing his competitive mindset and operational insight to Grand Tours Project. In 2020, he rose to CEO just before the COVID-19 pandemic and led the company through a successful recovery, boosting annual turnover, increasing customer loyalty, expanding operations to 19 countries across 3 continents, and earning B Corp certification for its commitment to sustainability and social impact.

Uri continues to lead with purpose, driven by a belief in sport and business as powerful tools for positive change.

== Sporting career ==
A member of the cycling team Amore & Vita from 2012 to 2017, Uri Martins represented the Mexican national team from 2007 to 2017, including several Pan American Championships and three UCI Road World Championships in 2007, 2013, and 2017.

In early 2012, the regional press announced that the Morelense had signed with Amore & Vita for at least two seasons. In the two years leading up to his contract, Uri claimed around twenty victories (eleven in 2011), including the national time trial title in his age category. These results were complemented by several top-ten finishes, including a fourth place at the Pan American Championships in Colombia. The manager of Amore & Vita, Cristian Fanini, was full of praise for the rider. He described Uri as a strong climber, comfortable in time trials and small group finishes. Impressed by his talent and determination, Fanini saw him as a future leader despite the disadvantage of having only raced on the American continent. At the time, Fanini was convinced that by welcoming Uri into the team, he was offering him the perfect environment to grow as a rider and eventually join a World Tour team.

Three podium finishes on stage arrivals at the Tour of Mexico, along with a medal at the national championships, led Uri Martins to consider 2015 his best season. Although 2011, raced in Mexico, was exceptional in terms of results, 2015 marked his consolidation in Europe. By December 2015, he was envisioning Olympic participation as the pinnacle of his career.

Over the course of his 16-year cycling career, Uri Martins achieved numerous podiums in international competitions and played a key role in securing the qualification points that allowed Mexico to participate in the Olympic Games. He became a two-time Mexican National Champion and, in his final season, earned two third-place finishes at the 2017 National Championships. His career also includes podiums on stage finishes at the Tour of Qinghai Lake and the Tour of Mexico. Before announcing his retirement, Uri competed in his third UCI Road World Championship, held in Bergen, Norway in 2017.

After sixteen years dedicated to cycling, Uri announced in November 2017 that he was ending his professional career to focus on drawing, design, and business, a passion that had earned him his first bicycle in a contest called "Imagine Your Future" ("Idea tu futuro") back in the year 2000.

== Major results ==
2011
National Under-23 Road Championships

1st Time trial
2nd Road race

2014
7th Overall Vuelta Mexico
2015
4th Road race, National Road Championships
2017
National Road Championships

3rd Road race
3rd Time trial

== See also ==
- List of people from Morelos
