= José Alfredo Santoyo =

Mexican cyclist (born 1995)

Personal information
- Full name: José Alfredo Santoyo González
- Born: 15 April 1995 (age 31) Jalisco, Mexico

Cycling career
- Sport: Cycling
- Current team: Crisa–SEEI
- Disciplines: Road; Track
- Role: Rider

Professional teams
- 2017–2018: Canel's–Specialized
- 2020–: Crisa–SEEI Pro Cycling
Medal record
Men's track cycling
Representing Mexico
Pan American Track Cycling Championships
Gold medal – first place	2016 Aguascalientes	Scratch

José Alfredo Santoyo González (born 15 April 1995) is a Mexican road and track cyclist, who currently rides for UCI Continental team Crisa–SEEI. He won the gold medal at the 2016 Pan American Track Cycling Championships in the scratch.

As a junior he competed at the 2013 UCI Road World Championships in the junior road race.
