= María Dolores Molina =

Guatemalan cyclist

Maria Dolores Molina
Personal information
- Born: 2 August 1966 (age 60) Guatemala

Cycling career
- Sport: Cycling
- Discipline: Road cycling
- Role: Rider
Medal record
Representing Guatemala
Central American and Caribbean Games
Gold medal – first place	2002 San Salvador	Time trial

Maria Dolores Molina (born 2 August 1966) is a road cyclist from Guatemala. She represented her nation at the 2004 Summer Olympics in the women's road race finishing 50th. In 2011, she became national time trial champion.
