= Orven =

Mexican cycling team

Team information
- UCI code: ORV
- Registered: Mexico
- Founded: 2009
- Disciplines: Pro and Elite Amateur Men's Road
- Status: Amateur

Key personnel
- General manager: Carlos Manuel Hernández

Orven is a cycling team based in Mexico. It ranked 6th in the 2012 Vuelta Mexico Telmex.

== History ==
In 1991, Orven came in sixth place in the Mexico Route. In 2006, the team was reformed.

== Team ==
- Orlando Hernández Mexico
- Patricio Portales Valle Mexico
- Andrés Rivera Mexico
- Juan José Nájera Oviedo Mexico
- Enrique Serrato Mexico
- Ronaldo López Mexico
