= El Refugio, Jalisco =

El Refugio
- Location in Mexico
- Coordinates: 20°40′14″N 103°44′16″W
- Country: Mexico
- State: Jalisco
- Municipality: Tizapan El Alto

Area
  - Total: 4.25 sq mi (11.01 km^{2})
- Elevation: 5,788 ft (1,764 m)

Population (2020)
  - Total: 369
- Postal code: 49400

El Refugio ("The Refuge") is a town in the Tizapan El Alto municipality of Jalisco, Mexico. The population was 369 according to the 2020 census. The population was recorded as 372 in the 2010 census.
