= Giuseppina Grassi =

Mexican cyclist (born 1976)

Personal information
- Full name: Alessandra Giuseppina; Grassi Herrera
- Born: 29 August 1976 (age 50) Mexico City, Mexico
- Height: 1.70 m (5 ft 7 in)
- Weight: 56 kg (123 lb)

Cycling career
- Sport: Cycling
- Discipline: Road
- Role: Rider, time-trialist
Medal record
Women's road bicycle racing
Representing Mexico
Pan American Games
Silver medal – second place	2007 Rio de Janeiro	Time trial
Pan American Championships
Gold medal – first place	2009 Hidalgo	Time trial
Silver medal – second place	2007 Valencia	Time trial
Silver medal – second place	2008 Montevideo	Time trial

Alessandra Giuseppina Grassi Herrera (born 29 August 1976) is a Mexican professional road cyclist. She won a silver medal in the women's time trial at the 2007 Pan American Games in Rio de Janeiro, Brazil, and later represented her nation Mexico at the 2008 Summer Olympics.

Grassi qualified for the Mexican squad, as a lone female cyclist, in the women's road race at the 2008 Summer Olympics in Beijing by receiving a single berth from the UCI World Cup. She successfully completed a grueling race with a forty-fifth-place effort in 3:36:35, recording the same time but finishing behind Belgium's Lieselot Decroix by an inch.

== Career highlights ==
2007
2nd Pan American Games, Rio de Janeiro (BRA)
2nd Pan American Championships (ITT)
2008
1st Mexican Championships (Road), Sonora (MEX)
1st Mexican Championships (ITT), Sonora (MEX)
2nd Pan American Championships (ITT)
45th Olympic Games, Beijing (CHN)
2009
1st Pan American Championships (ITT)
5th Pan American Championships (Road)
8th Stage 3, Route de France Féminine, France
2010
6th Pan American Championships (ITT)
10th Pan American Championships (Road)
2011
2nd Mexican Championships (ITT)
2012
2nd Mexican Championships (Road)
