= Andrea Ramírez (cyclist) =

Mexican cyclist

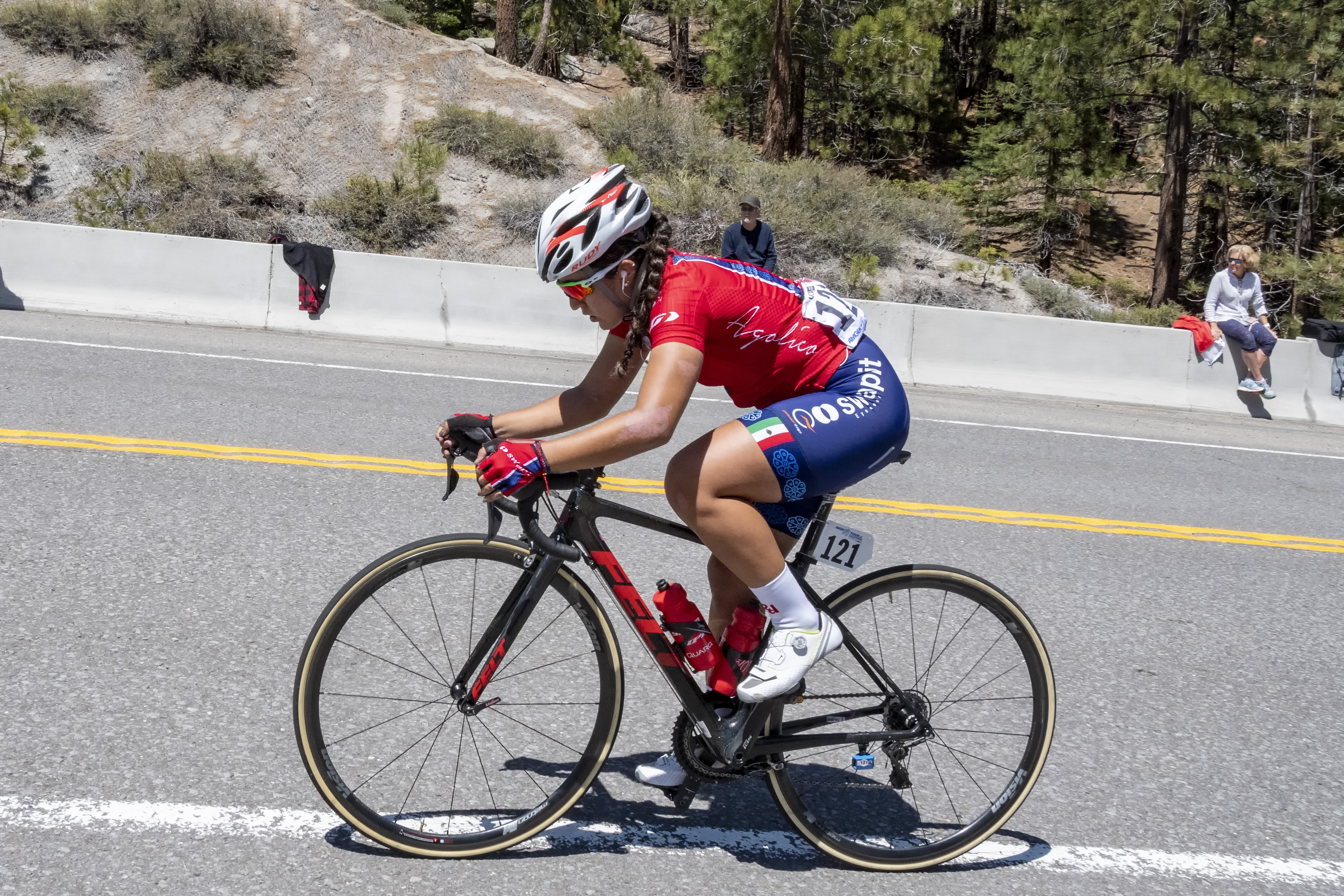
- Ramírez at the 2018 Tour of California

Personal information
- Full name: Andrea Ramírez Fregoso
- Born: 25 September 1999 (age 27) Zapopan, Jalisco

Cycling career
- Sport: Cycling
- Current team: A.R. Monex
- Discipline: Road
- Role: Rider
- Rider type: All-rounder

Professional teams
- 2018–2020: Swapit–Agolíco
- 2021–: A.R. Monex

Andrea Ramírez Fregoso (born 25 September 1999) is a Mexican professional racing cyclist, who currently rides for UCI Women's Continental Team A.R. Monex. On 28 June 2019 she won the Mexican women's time trials, and two days later came second at the national road race championships.

== Major results ==
2020
7th Overall Women's Tour Down Under
