= Vuelta Femenina a Guatemala =

Guatemalan multi-day road cycling race

Race details
- Date: June
- Region: Guatemala
- Discipline: Road
- Competition: National (2007–2017); UCI 2.2 (2018–)
- Type: Stage race
- Web site: fedeciclismogua.org

History
- First edition: 2007
- Editions: 12 (as of 2018)
- First winner: Adriana Rojas (CRC)
- Most wins: Cynthia Eugenia Lee (GUA) (3 wins)
- Most recent: Marcela Elizabeth Prieto (MEX)

The Vuelta Femenina a Guatemala is an annual professional road bicycle race for women in Guatemala.

== Winners ==
Year	Country	Rider	Team
2001	Mexico	Gabriela González	
2002	Mexico	Gabriela González	
2003	El Salvador	Evelyn García	
2004	Guatemala	Sindy Morales	
2005	Guatemala	María Dolores Molina	
2006	Guatemala	María Dolores Molina	
2007	Costa Rica	Adriana Rojas	
2008	Colombia	Luz Adriana Tovar	
2009	El Salvador	Evelyn García	Fenixs
2010	El Salvador	Evelyn García	
2011	Mexico	Claudia Veronica Leal	S.C. Michela Fanini Rox
2012	Guatemala	Cynthia Eugenia Lee	
2013	Guatemala	Cynthia Eugenia Lee	
2014	Guatemala	Emelyn Lourdes Galicia	
2015	Guatemala	Florinda Isabel De Leon	
2016	Guatemala	Cynthia Eugenia Lee	
2017	Guatemala	Jazmin Gabriela Soto	
2018	Mexico	Marcela Elizabeth Prieto	Swapit–Agolico
2019	Colombia	Liliana Moreno	Astana

== Classification jerseys ==
- – leader of the General classification
- – leader of the Mountains classification
- – leader of the Points classification
- – leader of the Guatemalan rider classification
