= Anet Barrera =

Mexican cyclist

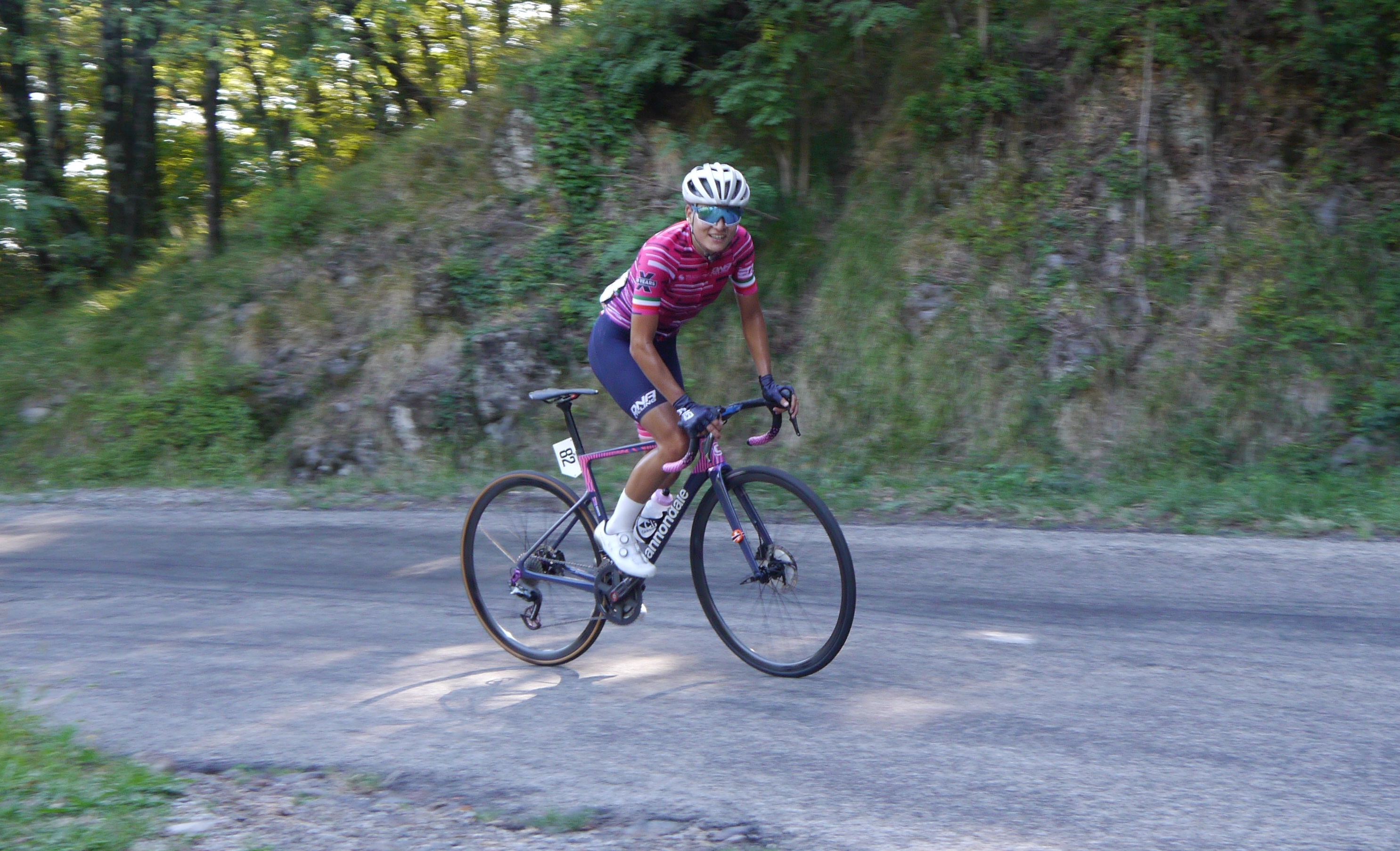
- Anet Barrera Esparza on TCFIA 2022.

Personal information
- Full name: Anet Barrera Esparza
- Born: 9 September 1998 (age 28)

Cycling career
- Sport: Cycling
- Current team: PatoBike–Juquilita
- Discipline: Road
- Role: Rider

Professional team
- 2018–: Swapit–Agolíco

Anet Barrera Esparza (born 9 September 1998) is a Mexican professional racing cyclist, who currently rides for UCI Women's Continental Team PatoBike–Juquilita. On 30 July 2019 she won the Mexican Road Race Championships in the category Under 23.

== Major results ==
2022
5th Overall Tour of the Gila

1st Young rider classification
