= Ruta del Centro =

Sport competition

Race details
- Date: April
- Region: Mexico
- Discipline: Road race
- Competition: UCI America Tour
- Type: Stage race

History
- First edition: 2011
- Editions: 4 (as of 2015)
- First winner: Luis Pulido (MEX)
- Most wins: No repeat winners
- Most recent: Bernardo Colex (MEX)

Ruta del Centro is a professional staged cycling race held annually in Mexico. It has been part of the UCI America Tour in category 2.2 since 2013.

== Winners ==
Year	Country	Rider	Team
2011	Mexico	Luis Pulido	
2012	Spain	Víctor García Estévez	
2013	Spain	Víctor García Estévez	
2014	Mexico	Bernardo Colex	
