= 2017 national road cycling championships =

The 2017 national road cycling championships will be held throughout the year and are organised by the UCI member federations. They began in Australia with the time trial event (both men and women) on 5 January, as is tradition.

== Jerseys ==
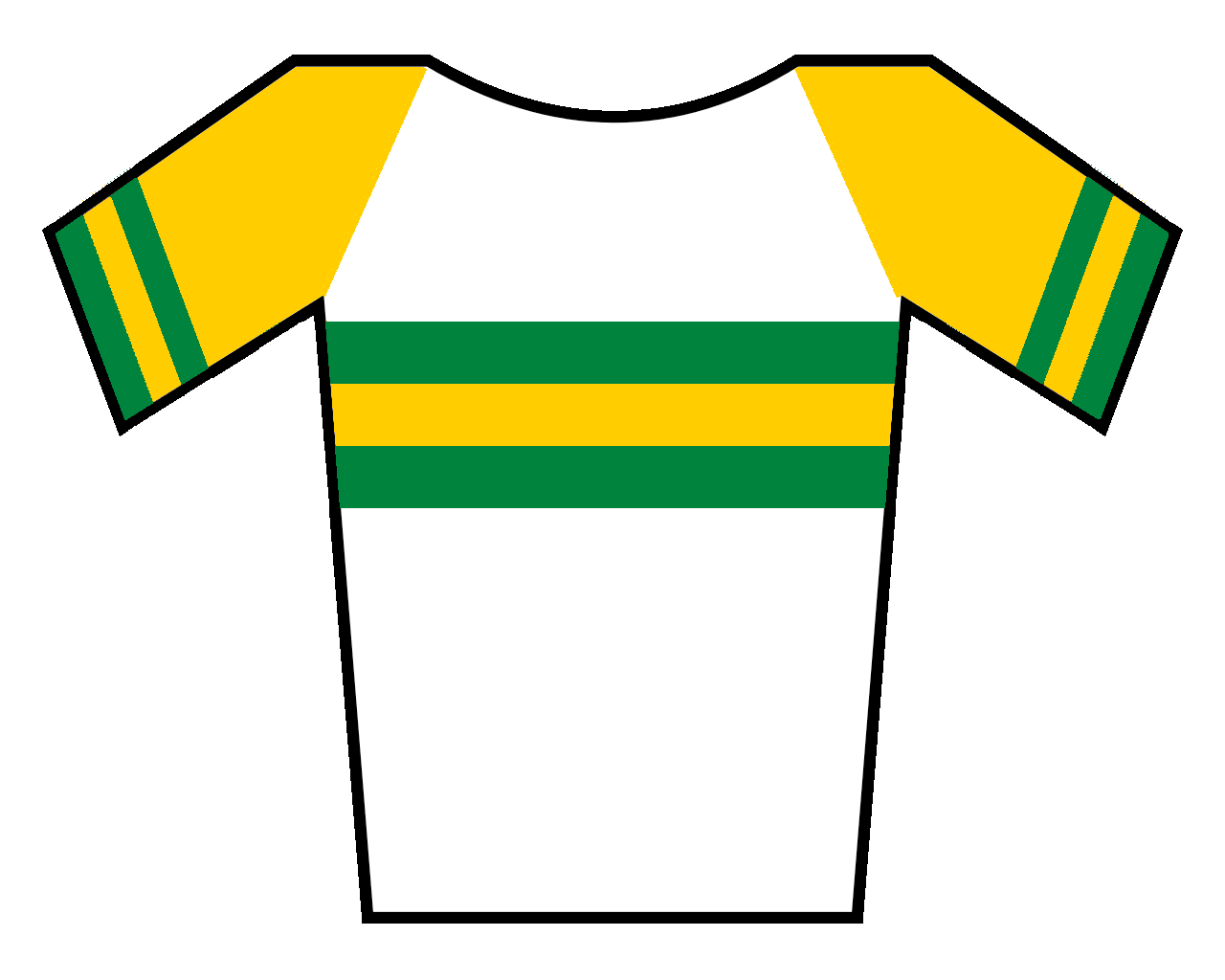
Australian Champion

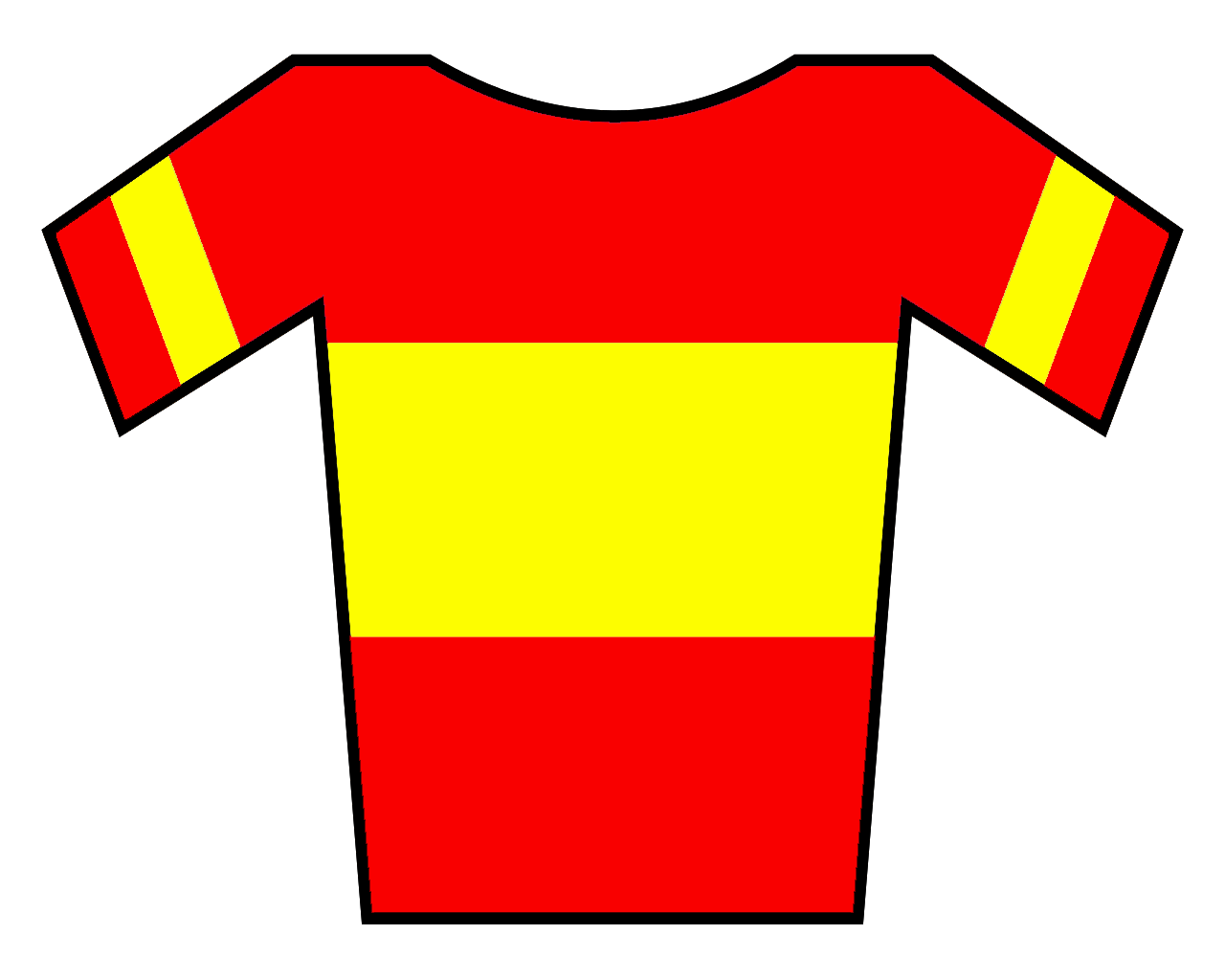
Spanish Champion

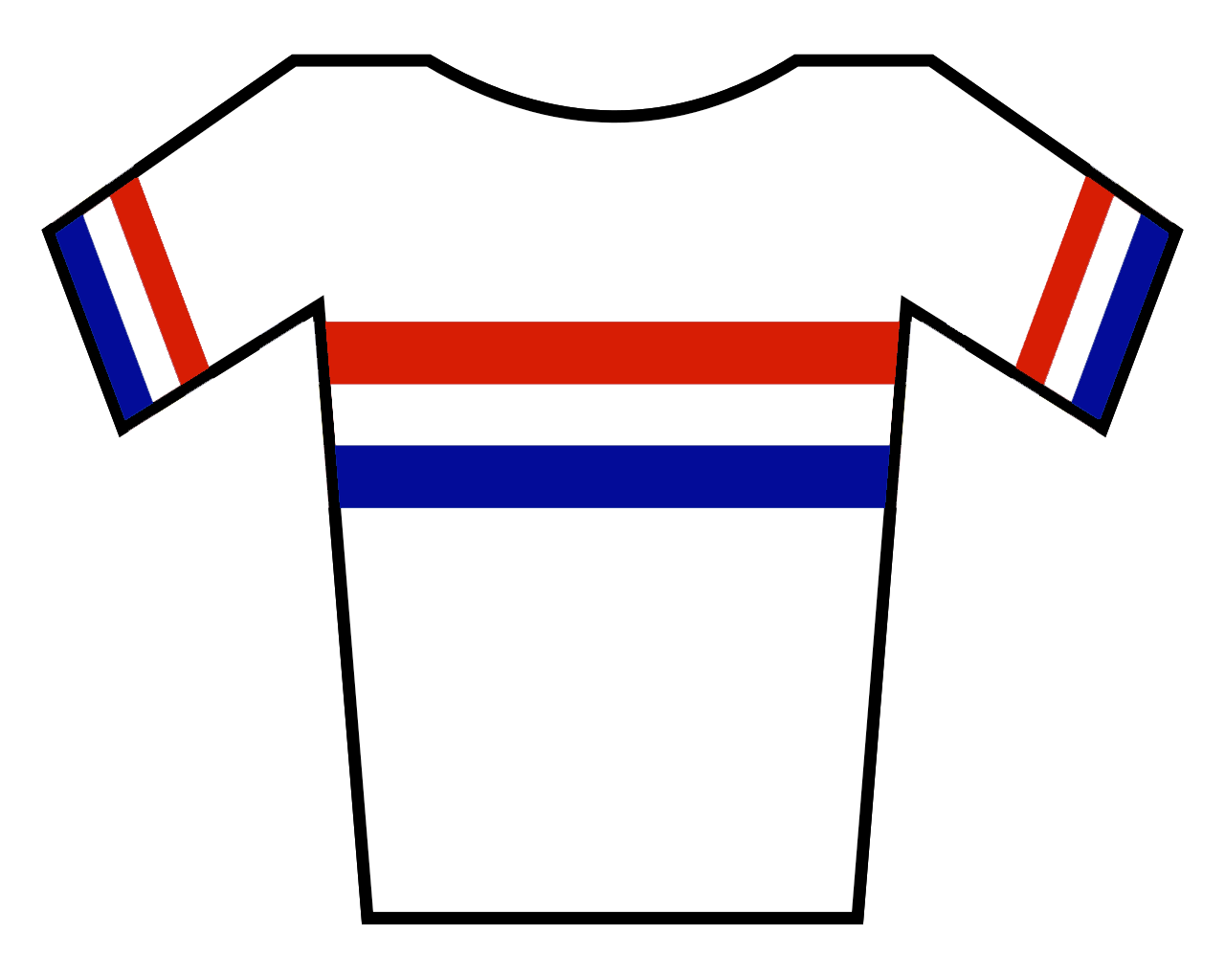
British
Champion

The winner of each national championship wears the national jersey in all their races for the next year in the respective discipline, apart from the World Championships and the Olympics, or unless they are wearing a category leader's jersey in a stage race. Most national champion jerseys tend to represent a country's flag or use the colours from it. Jerseys may also feature traditional sporting colours of a country that are not derived from a national flag, such as the green and gold on the jerseys of Australian national champions.

== 2017 champions ==
=== Men's Elite ===
Country	Men's Elite Road Race Champion	Road Race Champion's Team	Men's Elite Time Trial Champion	Time Trial Champion's Team
Albania	Ylber Sefa		Iltjan Nika	
Algeria	Youcef Reguigui	Team Qhubeka NextHash	Azzedine Lagab	NaturaBlue
Andorra			Julio Alfredo Pintado	Massi–Kuwait Cycling Project
Angola	Bruno Araujo		Dário António	
Antigua and Barbuda	Robert Francis Marsh		Marvin Spencer	
Argentina	Joaquin Gonzalo Najar	Sindicato de Empleados Publicos de San Juan	Mauricio Waldemar Muller	Sindicato de Empleados Publicos de San Juan
Aruba			Jean Carlo Ras	
Australia	Miles Scotson	BMC Racing Team	Rohan Dennis	BMC Racing Team
Austria	Gregor Mühlberger	Bora–Hansgrohe	Georg Preidler	Team Sunweb
Azerbaijan	Elgün Alizada	Synergy Baku	Elchin Asadov	Synergy Baku
Bahamas	Chad Albury		Liam Holowesko	
Barbados			Jesse Kelly	
Belarus	Nikolai Shumov		Stanislau Bazhkou	Minsk Cycling Club
Belgium	Oliver Naesen	AG2R La Mondiale	Yves Lampaert	Quick-Step Floors
Belize	Edgar Nissan Arana		Tarique Flowers	Benny's Megabytes Elite
Benin	Eric Ahouandjinou			
Bermuda	Dominique Mayho		Dominique Mayho	Asfra Racing Team Oudenaarde
Bolivia	Basílio Ramos		Javier Arando	Equipo Bolivia
Bosnia and Herzegovina	Ivan Siric		Vedad Karic	
Botswana	Abeng Malete		Abeng Malete	
Brazil	Roberto Pinheiro SIlva	Soul Brasil Pro Cycling	Magno Prado Nazaret	Soul Brasil Pro Cycling
Bulgaria	Nikolay Mihaylov	CCC–Sprandi–Polkowice	Radoslav Valentinov Konstantinov	
Burkina Faso	Mathias Sorgho			
Canada	Matteo Dal-Cin	Rally Cycling	Svein Tuft	Orica–Scott
Cayman Islands			James Smith	
Chile	José Luis Rodríguez Aguilar		José Luis Rodríguez Aguilar	
China	Jingbiao Zhao	Hengxiang Cycling Team	King Lok Cheung	Orica–Scott
Colombia	Sergio Henao	Team Sky	Jarlinson Pantano	Trek–Segafredo
Costa Rica	Gabriel Marín		Brian Salas	
Croatia	Josip Rumac	Synergy Baku	Matija Kvasina	Felbermayr–Simplon Wels
Cuba	Jan Carlos Arias		Emilio Perez	
Cyprus	Alexandros Agrotis		Andreas Miltiadis	
Czech Republic	Zdeněk Štybar	Quick-Step Floors	Jan Bárta	Bora–Hansgrohe
Denmark	Mads Pedersen	Trek–Segafredo	Martin Toft Madsen	BHS–Almeborg Bornholm
Dominican Republic	Ismael Sánchez	Aero Cycling Team	Augusto Sánchez	Aero Cycling Team
Ecuador	Jhonatan Narváez	Axeon Hagens Berman	Jorge Luis Revelo	
Egypt	Islam Ragaey	VIB Bikes	Islam Ragaey	VIB Bikes
El Salvador	Jose Dagoberto Joya		Jose Dagoberto Joya	
Eritrea	Meron Berhane		Mekseb Debesay	Team Dimension Data
Estonia	Gert Joeäär		Silver Mäoma	
Ethiopia	Hailemelekot Hailu		Tsgabu Grmay	Bahrain–Merida
Finland	Matti Manninen	Team FixIT.no	Sasu Halme	
France	Arnaud Démare	FDJ	Pierre Latour	AG2R La Mondiale
Georgia	Giorgi Nareklishvili		Beka Nareklishvili	
Germany	Marcus Burghardt	Bora–Hansgrohe	Tony Martin	Team Katusha–Alpecin
Ghana			Abdul Razak Mumin	
Great Britain	Steve Cummings	Team Dimension Data	Steve Cummings	Team Dimension Data
Greece	Charalampos Kastrantas	Dare Viator Partizan	Polychronis Tzortzakis	RTS–Monton Racing Team
Guam	Mark Galedo	7 Eleven–Roadbike Philippines		
Guatemala	Walter Escobar		Manuel Oseas Rodas Ochoa	
Guyana	Raynauth Jeffrey		Raynauth Jeffrey	
Honduras	Jorge Antonio Torres			
Hong Kong	Leung Chun Wing	HKSI Pro Cycling Team	Leung Chun Wing	HKSI Pro Cycling Team
Hungary	Krisztián Lovassy	Team Differdange–Losch	János Pelikán	Amplatz–BMC
Iceland	Anton Örn Elfarsson		Hakon Hrafn Sigurdsson	
India	Naveen John		Naveen John	
Iran	Mehdi Sohrabi		Mirsamad Pourseyedi	Tabriz Shahrdary Team
Ireland	Ryan Mullen	Cannondale–Drapac	Ryan Mullen	Cannondale–Drapac
Israel	Roy Goldstein	Israel Cycling Academy	Guy Sagiv	Israel Cycling Academy
Italy	Fabio Aru	Astana	Gianni Moscon	Team Sky
Ivory Coast	Bassirou Konte			
Jamaica	Oshane Williams		Hans Heusinkveld	
Japan	Yusuke Hatanaka	Team UKYO	Ryota Nishizono	Bridgestone–Anchor
Kazakhstan	Artyom Zakharov	Astana	Zhandos Bizhigitov	Astana
Kosovo	Rrahim Mani		Luan Haliti	
Latvia	Krists Neilands	Israel Cycling Academy	Aleksejs Saramotins	Bora–Hansgrohe
Lebanon	Elias Abou Rachid		Abdallah El Err	
Lithuania	Ignatas Konovalovas	FDJ	Ignatas Konovalovas	FDJ
Luxembourg	Bob Jungels	Quick-Step Floors	Jean-Pierre Drucker	BMC Racing Team
Madagascar	Julien Rakotoarivony		Andriamirado Rakotondravao	
Macedonia	Stefan Petrovski		Levent Rifat	
Mali	Yaya Diallo		Yaya Diallo	
Malta	Christian Formosa		Etienne Bonello	
Mauritius	Philippe Colin		Christopher Lagane	
Mexico	Efren Santos		Ignacio Prado	Sindicato de Empleados Publicos de San Juan
Moldova	Nicolae Tanovițchii		Nicolae Tanovițchii	
Mongolia	Altanzul Altansukh	Ningxia Sports Lottery–Livall Cycling Team	Maral-Erdene Batmunkh	Terengganu Cycling Team
Montenegro	Goran Cerovic		Goran Cerovic	
Morocco	Essaïd Abelouache		Mouhssine Lahsaini	
Namibia	Till Drobisch		Till Drobisch	
Netherlands	Ramon Sinkeldam	Team Sunweb	Tom Dumoulin	Team Sunweb
New Zealand	Joseph Cooper	IsoWhey Sports SwissWellness	Jack Bauer	Quick-Step Floors
Nicaragua	Jaime Gabriel Ramirez		Marlon Antonio Samayoa	
Norway	Rasmus Tiller		Edvald Boasson Hagen	Team Dimension Data
Panama	Cristofer Robin Jurado Lopez		Franklin Archibold	
Paraguay	Antero Daniel Velázquez Ramirez		Víctor Manuel Grange González	
Peru	Alonso Miguel Gamero		Alonso Miguel Gamero	
Poland	Adrian Kurek	CCC–Sprandi–Polkowice	Michał Kwiatkowski	Team Sky
Portugal	Ruben Guerreiro	Trek–Segafredo	Domingos Gonçalves	Rádio Popular–Boavista
Puerto Rico	Elvys Noel Reyes		Xavier Santana	
Romania	Marius Petrache		Eduard Grosu	Nippo–Vini Fantini
Russia	Alexander Porsev	Gazprom–RusVelo	Ilnur Zakarin	Team Katusha–Alpecin
Rwanda	Gasore Hategeka		Adrien Niyonshuti	Team Dimension Data
Senegal	Guy Antoine Diandy			
Serbia	Dusan Kalaba	Dare–Viator Partizan	Dusan Rajovic	Adria Mobil
Seychelles	Miguel Mathieu		Dominic Arrisol	
Singapore	Choon Huat Goh	Terengganu Cycling Team		
Slovakia	Juraj Sagan	Bora–Hansgrohe	Marek Čanecký	Amplatz–BMC
Slovenia	Luka Mezgec	Orica–Scott	Jan Polanc	UAE Team Emirates
South Africa	Reinardt Janse van Rensburg	Team Dimension Data	Daryl Impey	Orica–Scott
South Korea	Jang Kyung-gu		Hyeong Min Choe	Geumsan Insam–Cello
Spain	Jesús Herrada	Movistar Team	Jonathan Castroviejo	Movistar Team
Saint Lucia	Andrew Norbert			
Sweden	Kim Magnusson	Team Tre Berg–PostNord	Tobias Ludvigsson	FDJ
Switzerland	Silvan Dillier	BMC Racing Team	Stefan Küng	BMC Racing Team
Taiwan	Chun Kai Feng	Bahrain–Merida	Chun Kai Feng	Bahrain–Merida
Turkey	Onur Balkan		Ahmet Örken	Torku Åžekerspor
Tunisia	Ali Nouisri		Ali Nouisri	
Ukraine	Vitaliy Buts	Kolss Cycling Team	Oleksandr Polivoda	Kolss Cycling Team
United Arab Emirates	Yousif Mirza	UAE Abu Dhabi	Yousif Mirza	UAE Abu Dhabi
Uganda	Mudathili Ali			
United States	Larry Warbasse	Aqua Blue Sport	Joey Rosskopf	BMC Racing Team
Uruguay	Richard Mascarañas		Agustín Moreira	
Uzbekistan	Ruslan Karimov	RTS–Monton Racing Team	Muradjan Halmuratov	Beijing XDS–Innova Cycling Team
Venezuela	Miguel Armando Ubeto		Pedro Gutiérrez	
Vietnam	Minh Trin Tran Nguyen		Duc Tam Trinh	
Zimbabwe	Mpumelelo Dube		Dave Martin	

==== Champions in UCI WorldTeams ====
Team	Road Race Champions	Time Trial Champions
AG2R La Mondiale	Oliver Naesen (BEL)	Pierre Latour (FRA)
Astana	Fabio Aru (ITA); Artyom Zakharov (KAZ)	Zhandos Bizhigitov (KAZ)
Bahrain–Merida	Chun Kai Feng (TWN)	Tsgabu Grmay (ETH); Chun Kai Feng (TWN)
BMC Racing Team	Miles Scotson (AUS); Silvan Dillier (SUI)	Rohan Dennis (AUS); Jean-Pierre Drucker (LUX); Stefan Küng (SUI); Joey Rosskopf (USA)
Bora–Hansgrohe	Gregor Mühlberger (AUT); Marcus Burghardt (GER); Juraj Sagan (SVK)	Jan Bárta (CZE); Aleksejs Saramotins (LAT)
Cannondale–Drapac	Ryan Mullen (IRE)	Ryan Mullen (IRE)
FDJ	Arnaud Démare (FRA); Ignatas Konovalovas (LTU)	Ignatas Konovalovas (LTU); Tobias Ludvigsson (SWE)
Lotto–Soudal		
Movistar Team	Jesús Herrada (ESP)	Jonathan Castroviejo (ESP)
Orica–Scott	Luka Mezgec (SLO)	Svein Tuft (CAN); King Lok Cheung (CHN); Daryl Impey (RSA)
Quick-Step Floors	Zdeněk Štybar (CZE); Bob Jungels (LUX)	Yves Lampaert (BEL); Jack Bauer (NZL)
Team Dimension Data	Youcef Reguigui (ALG); Steve Cummings (GBR); Reinardt Janse van Rensburg (RSA)	Mekseb Debesay (ERI); Steve Cummings (GBR); Edvald Boasson Hagen (NOR); Adrien Niyonshuti (RWA)
Team Katusha–Alpecin		Tony Martin (GER); Ilnur Zakarin (RUS)
LottoNL–Jumbo		
Team Sky	Sergio Henao (COL)	Gianni Moscon (ITA); Michał Kwiatkowski (POL)
Team Sunweb	Ramon Sinkeldam (NED)	Georg Preidler (AUT); Tom Dumoulin (NED)
Trek–Segafredo	Mads Pedersen (DEN); Ruben Guerreiro (POR)	Jarlinson Pantano (COL)
UAE Team Emirates	Yousif Mirza (UAE)	Jan Polanc (SLO); Yousif Mirza (UAE)

=== Women's Elite ===
Country	Women's Elite Road Race Champion	Road Race Champion's Team	Women's Elite Time Trial Champion	Time Trial Champion's Team
Algeria	Aicha Tihar		Aicha Tihar	
Antigua and Barbuda	Vanessa Kelsick		Vanessa Kelsick	
Argentina	Dolores Rodríguez Rey		Valeria Teresita Müller	
Aruba	Benay Statia		Sandra Postma	
Australia	Katrin Garfoot	Orica–Scott	Katrin Garfoot	Orica–Scott
Austria	Martina Ritter	Drops	Martina Ritter	Drops
Azerbaijan	Olena Pavlukhina	Astana	Olena Pavlukhina	Astana
Belgium	Jolien D'Hoore	Wiggle High5	Ann-Sophie Duyck	Drops
Belarus	Tatsiana Sharakova	Minsk Cycling Club	Tatsiana Sharakova	Minsk Cycling Club
Belize			Alicia Thompson	
Bermuda			Ashley Estwanik	
Bolivia	unknown		unknown	
Brazil	Clemilda Fernandes Silva	Servetto Giusta	Ana Paula Polegatch	
Canada	Allison Beveridge	Rally Cycling Women	Karol-Ann Canuel	Boels–Dolmans
Chile			Aranza Valentina Villalon	Weber–Shimano Ladies Power
Colombia	Luisa Naranjo	Pedalea Cycling Team	Ana Sanabria	
Costa Rica	Natalia Navarro		Milagro Mena	SAS–Macogep
Croatia	Mia Radotić	BTC City Ljubljana	Mia Radotić	BTC City Ljubljana
Cuba	Arlenis Sierra	Astana Women's Team	Arlenis Sierra	Astana Women's Team
Cyprus	Antri Christoforou	Servetto Giusta	Marina Theodorou	
Czech Republic	Nikola Nosková	Bepink–Cogeas	Nikola Nosková	Bepink–Cogeas
Denmark	Camilla Møllebro	Team VéloCONCEPT	Cecilie Uttrup Ludwig	Cervélo–Bigla Pro Cycling
Dominican Republic	Cesarina Ballenilla	Team Caribe	Juana Fernández	Inteja DCT
El Salvador	Evelyn García		Evelyn García	
Eritrea			Mossana Debesay	
Estonia	Kelly Kalm	Isorex Ladies Team	Liisi Rist	
Faroe Islands	Birita Poulsen		Birita Poulsen	
Finland	Lotta Lepistö	Cervélo–Bigla Pro Cycling	Lotta Lepistö	Cervélo–Bigla Pro Cycling
France	Charlotte Bravard	FDJ Nouvelle-Aquitaine Futuroscope	Audrey Cordon	Wiggle High5
Germany	Lisa Klein	Cervélo–Bigla Pro Cycling	Trixi Worrack	Canyon//SRAM
Great Britain	Lizzie Deignan	Boels–Dolmans	Claire Rose	Visit Dallas DNA Pro Cycling
Greece	Argiro Milaki		Eleni Tsimpol	
Guatemala	Nicolle Bruderer	Tibco–Silicon Valley Bank	Nicolle Bruderer	Tibco–Silicon Valley Bank
Hong Kong	Qianyu Yang		Yao Pang	
Honduras	Angie De Jesus Gomez			
Hungary	Mónika Király	S.C. Michela Fanini Rox	Mónika Király	S.C. Michela Fanini Rox
Iceland	Erla Sigurlaug Sigurdardottir			
Iran	Parastoo Bastidehkharghani		Somayeh Yazdani	
Israel	Omer Shapira	Giusfredi–Bianchi	Shani Bloch-Davidov	Team VéloCONCEPT
Ireland	Lydia Boylan		Eileen Burns	
Italy	Elisa Longo Borghini	Wiggle High5	Elisa Longo Borghini	Wiggle High5
Ivory Coast	Adahi Orneila Kouassi			
Japan	Eri Yonamine	FDJ Nouvelle-Aquitaine Futuroscope	Eri Yonamine	FDJ Nouvelle-Aquitaine Futuroscope
Kazakhstan	Tatyana Geneleva	Astana	Natalya Sokovnina	Servetto Giusta
South Korea	Ah Reum Na		Ju Mi Lee	
Latvia	Lija Laizāne	Aromitalia Vaiano	Lija Laizāne	Aromitalia Vaiano
Lithuania	Daiva Tušlaitė	Alé–Cipollini	Ernesta Strainyte	
Luxembourg	Christine Majerus	Boels–Dolmans	Christine Majerus	Boels–Dolmans
Mexico	Íngrid Drexel	Tibco–Silicon Valley Bank	Íngrid Drexel	Tibco–Silicon Valley Bank
Mongolia	Jamsran Ulziisolongo		Jamsran Ulziisolongo	
Morocco	Nadia Skoukdi		Nadia Skoukdi	
Netherlands	Chantal Blaak	Boels–Dolmans	Annemiek van Vleuten	Orica–Scott
Norway	Vita Heine	Team Hitec Products	Vita Heine	Team Hitec Products
Namibia	Vera Adrian	Bizkaia–Durango	Vera Adrian	Bizkaia–Durango
New Zealand	Rushlee Buchanan	UnitedHealthcare	Jaime Nielsen	
Paraguay	Araceli Jazmín Galeano Centurión		Araceli Jazmín Galeano Centurión	
Panama	Fernanda Mendez		Anibel Prieto	
Peru	Angie Marielle Paulett Bustamante		Romina Medrano Ilizarbe	
Poland	Karolina Karasiewicz	Torunski Klub Kolarski Pacific–Nestlé Fitness	Katarzyna Pawłowska	Boels–Dolmans
Puerto Rico			Donelys Cariño	
Romania	Ana Covrig	Top Girls Fassa Bortolo	Ana Covrig	Top Girls Fassa Bortolo
Russia	Anastasia Iakovenko		Ksenia Tsymbalyuk	
Rwanda			Beatha Ingabire	
Serbia	Jelena Erić	BTC City Ljubljana	Jelena Erić	BTC City Ljubljana
Singapore	Yi Wei Luo		Yi Wei Luo	
Slovakia	Alžbeta Pavlendová		Janka Števková	
Slovenia	Polona Batagelj	BTC City Ljubljana	Urša Pintar	BTC City Ljubljana
South Africa	Heidi Dalton	Aromitalia Vaiano	Ashleigh Moolman	Cervélo–Bigla Pro Cycling
Spain	Sheyla Gutiérrez	Cylance Pro Cycling	Lourdes Oyarbide	Bizkaia–Durango
Sweden	Sara Penton	Team VéloCONCEPT	Lisa Nordén	
Switzerland	Nicole Hanselmann	Cervélo–Bigla Pro Cycling	Marlen Reusser	
Ukraine	Yevgenia Vysotska	Conceria Zabri–Fanini–Guerciotti	Yevgenia Vysotska	Conceria Zabri–Fanini–Guerciotti
United States	Amber Neben	Team VéloCONCEPT	Amber Neben	Team VéloCONCEPT
Uzbekistan	Olga Jantuganova		Renata Baimetova	
Venezuela	Jennifer Mariana César Salazar		Lilibeth Chacón	
Zimbabwe	Skye Davidson		Helen Mitchell	

==== Champions in UCI Women's World Tour Teams ====
Team (Note: These are the Top-20 teams which are automatically invited to Women's World Tour events.: Key / Invitation; / Top-15 team, invited to all UCI WWT one-day & stage races automatically; / Top-20 team, invited to all UCI WWT one-day races automatically)	Road Race Champions	Time Trial Champions
Alé–Cipollini	Daiva Tušlaitė (LTU)	
Astana	Olena Pavlukhina (AZE); Arlenis Sierra (CUB); Tatyana Geneleva (KAZ)	Olena Pavlukhina (AZE); Arlenis Sierra (CUB)
Bepink–Cogeas	Nikola Nosková (CZE)	Nikola Nosková (CZE)
Boels–Dolmans	Lizzie Deignan (GBR); Chantal Blaak (NED); Christine Majerus (LUX)	Karol-Ann Canuel (CAN); Christine Majerus (LUX); Katarzyna Pawłowska (POL)
BTC City Ljubljana	Mia Radotić (CRO); Jelena Erić (SRB); Polona Batagelj (SLO)	Mia Radotić (CRO); Jelena Erić (SRB); Urša Pintar (SLO)
Canyon//SRAM		Trixi Worrack (GER)
Cervélo–Bigla Pro Cycling	Lotta Lepistö (FIN); Lisa Klein (GER); Nicole Hanselmann (SUI)	Cecilie Uttrup Ludwig (DEN); Lotta Lepistö (FIN); Ashleigh Moolman (RSA)
Cylance Pro Cycling	Sheyla Gutiérrez (ESP)	
FDJ Nouvelle-Aquitaine Futuroscope	Charlotte Bravard (FRA); Eri Yonamine (JPN)	Eri Yonamine (JPN)
Lares–Waowdeals		
Lensworld–Kuota		
Lotto–Soudal Ladies		
Orica–Scott	Katrin Garfoot (AUS)	Katrin Garfoot (AUS); Annemiek van Vleuten (NED)
Servetto Giusta	Clemilda Fernandes Silva (BRA); Antri Christoforou (CYP)	Natalya Sokovnina (KAZ)
Team Hitec Products	Vita Heine (NOR)	Vita Heine (NOR)
Team Sunweb		
Team VéloCONCEPT	Sara Penton (SWE); Camilla Møllebro (DEN); Amber Neben (USA)	Shani Bloch-Davidov (ISR); Amber Neben (USA)
Tibco–Silicon Valley Bank	Nicolle Bruderer (GUA); Íngrid Drexel (MEX)	Íngrid Drexel (MEX); Nicolle Bruderer (GUA)
Wiggle High5	Jolien D'Hoore (BEL); Elisa Longo Borghini (ITA)	Audrey Cordon (FRA); Elisa Longo Borghini (ITA)
WM3 Energie		

== See also ==
- 2017 in men's road cycling
- 2017 in women's road cycling
