= Cycling at the 2006 Central American and Caribbean Games =

- Location: Cartagena
- Dates: 21 and 22 July

This page shows the results of the cycling competition at the 2006 Central American and Caribbean Games, held on July 21 and July 22, 2006, in Cartagena, Colombia.

== Medal summary ==
=== Men's events ===
Event	Gold	Silver	Bronze
1 km Time Trial	Wilson Meneses (COL)	Julio César Herrera (CUB)	Jhonny Hernandez (VEN)
Sprint	Jonathan Marín (COL)	Ahmed López (CUB)	Julio César Herrera (CUB)
Team Sprint	Cuba; Julio César Herrera; Yosvani Poll; Alexis Sotolongo	Colombia; Rodrigo Barros; Jonathan Marín; Hernán Sánchez	Venezuela; Alexander Cornieles; Jhonny Hernandez; César Marcano
4000m Individual Pursuit	Carlos Alzate (COL)	Jairo Pérez (COL)	Tomás Gil (VEN)
4000m Team Pursuit	Colombia; José Serpa; Alexander González; Arles Castro; Jairo Pérez	Venezuela; Tomás Gil; Andris Hernández; Isaac Cañizales; Frederick Segura	Dominican Republic; Jose Coronado; Wendy Cruz; Jorge Pérez; Augusto Sánchez
Points Race	Richard Ochoa (VEN)	Andris Hernández (VEN)	Michel Fernandez (CUB)
Keirin	Jose Sochon (GUA)	Ricardo Lynch (JAM)	César Marcano (VEN)
Scratch	Oneil Samuel (JAM)	Miguel Chacón (VEN)	Vladimir Estevez (DOM)
Madison	Dominican Republic; Jorge Pérez; Augusto Sánchez	Cuba; Michel Fernandez; Yunier Alonso	Mexico; Rodolfo Avila; José Sánchez
Road Race	Fausto Esparza (MEX)	Jhon García (COL)	Artur García (VEN)
Road Time Trial	José Serpa (COL)	Jose Chacon (VEN)	Tomás Gil (VEN)

=== Women's events ===
Event	Gold	Silver	Bronze
500m Time Trial	Diana García (COL)	Nancy Contreras (MEX)	Lisandra Guerra (CUB)
Sprint	Lisandra Guerra (CUB)	Diana García (COL)	Nancy Contreras (MEX)
3000m Individual Pursuit	María Luisa Calle (COL)	Yoanka González (CUB)	Isabella Yumar (VEN)
Points Race	Yoanka González (CUB)	Yumari González (CUB)	Karelia Machado (VEN)
Keirin	Yumari González (CUB)	Diana García (COL)	Nancy Contreras (MEX)
Scratch	Iona Wynter (JAM)	Yumari González (CUB)	Karelia Machado (VEN)
Road Race	Yoanka González (CUB)	Yumari González (CUB)	Danielys García (VEN)
Road Time Trial	María Luisa Calle (COL)	Marie Rosado (PUR)	Yudelmis Domínguez (CUB)

== Medal table ==
* Host nation (Colombia)

Rank	Nation	Gold	Silver	Bronze	Total
1	Colombia*	8	5	0	13
2	Cuba	5	7	4	16
3	Jamaica	2	1	0	3
4	Venezuela	1	4	10	15
5	Mexico	1	1	3	5
6	Dominican Republic	1	0	2	3
7	Guatemala	1	0	0	1
8	Puerto Rico	0	1	0	1
Totals (8 entries)		19	19	19	57

== Results ==
=== Men's competition ===
==== Individual Time Trial (44 km) ====
- Held on 2006-07-21

Rank	Name	Time
Gold medal	José Serpa (COL)	00:53.03
Silver medal	José Chacón Díaz (VEN)	+ 0.56
Bronze medal	Tomás Gil (VEN)	+ 2.09
4	Libardo Niño (COL)	+ 3.37
5	Jhonny Morales (GUA)	+ 4.09
6	Fausto Esparza (MEX)	+ 4.13
7	Manuel Rodas (GUA)	+ 4.53
8	Domingo González (MEX)	+ 5.20
9	Anthony van Lierop (SUR)	+ 8.58
10	Tinga Turner (JAM)	+ 9.00
11	Guy Costa (TRI)	+ 11.13
12	Raydean Lawson (JAM)	+ 12.56
13	Barron Musgrove (BAH)	+ 13.02
14	Ian Smith (BIZ)	+ 13.24
15	Frederick Irving (ARU)	+ 14.05
16	Gregory Lovell (BIZ)	+ 14.06
17	Lucien Disksz (ARU)	+ 14.08
18	Tomas Neil (BVI)	+ 19.33

==== Individual Road Race (142 km) ====
- Held on 2006-07-22

Rank	Name	Time
Gold medal	Fausto Esparza (MEX)	04:00.51
Silver medal	Jhon García (COL)	—
Bronze medal	Artur García (VEN)	—
4	Jackson Rodríguez (VEN)	+ 0.04
5	Jairo Pérez (COL)	+ 0.21
6	Emile Abraham (TRI)	+ 0.46
7	Luis Pulido (MEX)	+ 2.54
8	Manuel Medina (VEN)	—
9	Heberth Gutiérrez (COL)	+ 2.56
10	Ismael Sánchez (DOM)	+ 3.04
11	José Frank Rodríguez (DOM)	+ 10.55
12	Oneil Samuels (JAM)	+ 11.49
13	Domingo González (MEX)	—
14	Arnold Alcolea (CUB)	—
15	José Alirio Contreras (VEN)	—
16	Miguel Ubeto (VEN)	—
17	Andrés Guamuch (GUA)	—
18	José Chacón Díaz (VEN)	—
19	Jans Carlos Arías (CUB)	—
20	Luis Alberto Santizo (GUA)	—
21	Rodolfo Fernández (MEX)	—
22	Marco Ortega (MEX)	—
23	John Parra (COL)	—
24	Guy Costa (TRI)	—
25	Noel Julian Yac Yac (GUA)	—
26	José Serpa (COL)	—
27	Arquimides Lam (MEX)	—
28	Robert Marsh (ANT)	—
29	Raydean Lawson (JAM)	—
30	Jorge Pérez (DOM)	—
31	Wendy Cruz (DOM)	—
32	Pedro Pablo Pérez (CUB)	—
33	Reldys Pérez (CUB)	—
34	José Coronado (DOM)	—
35	Rowan Wilson (TRI)	—
36	Danilo Ketzel (GUA)	+ 30.30
37	Luis Danilo Marroquin (GUA)	—
38	Juan Carlos Hernández (GUA)	—
39	Gregory Lovell (BIZ)	—
40	Marlon Antrobus (VIN)	+ 30.37
41	Mewett Geri (BER)	+ 30.56
42	Anthony van Lierop (SUR)	+ 30.56
43	Ian Smith (BIZ)	+ 31.19

=== Women's competition ===
==== Individual Time Trial (22 km) ====
- Held on 2006-07-21

Rank	Name	Time
Gold medal	María Luisa Calle (COL)	30.20.69
Silver medal	Marie Rosado (PUR)	+0.24.59
Bronze medal	Yudelmis Domínguez (CUB)	+0.42.74
4	Iona Wynter (JAM)	+0.57.03
5	Mónica Méndez (COL)	+0.58.58
6	Giuseppina Grassi (MEX)	+1.03.78
7	Yumari González (CUB)	+1.07.71
8	Danielys García (VEN)	+1.53.01
9	Maríbel Díaz (MEX)	+2.12.67
10	Susan Brown (ISV)	+2.13.60
11	Cindy Morales (GUA)	+2.47.27
12	Eliza Paola Mazariegos (GUA)	+5.13.11
13	Gina Lovell (BIZ)	+7.10.55

==== Individual Road Race (88 km) ====
- Held on 2006-07-22

Rank	Name	Time
Gold medal	Yoanka González (CUB)	02:23.58
Silver medal	Yumari González (CUB)	+ 0.02
Bronze medal	Danielys García (VEN)	+ 0.09
4	María Luisa Calle (COL)	+ 0.12
5	Verónica Leal (MEX)	—
6	Giuseppina Grassi (MEX)	+ 0.15
7	Yudelmis Domínguez (CUB)	+ 0.17
8	Iona Wynter (JAM)	+ 0.21
9	Maria Rosario Peralta (MEX)	—
10	Laura Lorenza Morffi (MEX)	—
11	Yeima Torres (CUB)	—
12	Ana Gómez (DOM)	—
13	Isabela Yumar (VEN)	—
14	Laura Lozano (COL)	+ 0.29
15	Marie Rosado (PUR)	+ 0.33
16	Magdaly Trujillo (COL)	+ 0.37
17	Karelia Machado (VEN)	—
18	Adriana Lovera (VEN)	—
19	Blendys Rojas (VEN)	—
20	Susan Brown (ISV)	—
21	Fransimar Pinto (VEN)	—
22	Moníca Méndez (COL)	—
23	Elizabeth Agudelo (COL)	+ 0.44
24	Dalila Rodríguez (CUB)	—
25	Jennifer Prensa (DOM)	+ 0.52
26	Maríbel Díaz (MEX)	+ 0.55
27	Cindy Morales (GUA)	+ 1.00
28	Margarita Rodríguez (DOM)	+ 1.11
29	Rosaura Carrasco (DOM)	+ 13.38
30	Eliza Mazariegos (GUA)	+ 14.33
31	Gina Lovell (BIZ)	+ 27.45
