= British Virgin Islands National Road Championships =

Race details
- Date: June
- Discipline: Road
- Type: One-day race

The British Virgin Islands National Road Championships are held annually to decide the cycling champions in both the road race and time trial discipline, across various categories.

== Men ==
=== Road Race ===
| Year | Winner | Second | Third |
|---|---|---|---|
| 2007 | Robert Bumann (United States Virgin Islands) | Robert Frances Marsh (Antigua and Barbuda) | Chris Ghiorse (United States Virgin Islands) |
| 2008 | Not Held |
| 2009 | Aurélien Moyon (France) | Wendy Cruz (Dominican Republic) | Jyme Bridges (Antigua and Barbuda) |
| 2010 | Akeem Sasso (United Kingdom) | Robert Frances Marsh (Antigua and Barbuda) | Ricardo Romney (United Kingdom) |
| 2011 | Robert Frances Marsh (Antigua and Barbuda) | Hansel Orano Andrews (Saint Vincent and the Grenadines) | Darel Jr Christopher |
| 2012 | Lynn Byron Murray (Antigua and Barbuda) | Mark Defour (United States Virgin Islands) | Andre Simon (Antigua and Barbuda) |
| 2013 | Mark Defour (United States Virgin Islands) | Philippe Leory | Cumber Greaux (United States Virgin Islands) |
| 2014 | Hansel Orano Andrews (Saint Vincent and the Grenadines) | Antonio Andrews (Saint Vincent and the Grenadines) | Timothy Thomas (Antigua and Barbuda) |
| 2015 | Andre Simon (Antigua and Barbuda) | Statius Talium | Ian Walker (United Kingdom) |
| 2016 | Philippe Leory | Nicholas Alphonso (Guyana) | Hansel Orano Andrews (Saint Vincent and the Grenadines) |
| 2017 | Not Held |
| 2018 | Not Held |
| 2019 | Zambezi Richardson (Anguilla) | Rene Gayral (Antigua and Barbuda) | Philippe Leory |
| 2020 | Philippe Leory | Hansel Orano Andrews (Saint Vincent and the Grenadines) | Andel Rock |

=== Time Trial ===
| Year | Winner | Second | Third |
|---|---|---|---|
| 2007 | Chris Ghiorse | Paul Trivino (United States Virgin Islands) | Juancito Gario (United States Virgin Islands) |
| 2008 | Not Held |
| 2009 | Hansel Orano Andrews (Saint Vincent and the Grenadines) | Mark Smith | Andrew Thompson |
| 2010 | Darel Jr Christopher | Hansel Orano Andrews (Saint Vincent and the Grenadines) | Andrew Thompson |
| 2011 | Hansel Orano Andrews (Saint Vincent and the Grenadines) | Darel Jr Christopher | Andrew Thompson |
| 2012 | Hansel Orano Andrews (Saint Vincent and the Grenadines) | Andre Simon | Philippe Leory |
| 2013 | Philippe Leory | Richard Morgan (Saint Vincent and the Grenadines) | Hansel Orano Andrews (Saint Vincent and the Grenadines) |
| 2014 | Not Held |
| 2015 | Not Held |
| 2016 | Philippe Leory | Hansel Orano Andrews (Saint Vincent and the Grenadines) | Nicholas Alphonso (Guyana) |
| 2017 | Not Held |
| 2018 | Not Held |
| 2019 | Philippe Leory | Rene Gayral (Antigua and Barbuda) | Bram Sanderson (Dominica) |
| 2020 | Philippe Leory | Hansel Orano Andrews (Saint Vincent and the Grenadines) | Tubes |
