= Inteja Dominican Cycling Team =

Team information
- UCI code: DCT
- Registered: Dominican Republic
- Founded: 2015
- Discipline: Road
- Status: UCI Continental

Team name history
- 2015–2016 2017–: Inteja–MMR Dominican Cycling Team; Inteja Dominican Cycling Team

Inteja Dominican Cycling Team is a Dominican UCI Continental cycling team established in 2015.

== Team roster ==
Rider	Date of birth
José Alfredo Aguirre (MEX)	4 January 1994 (age 32)
Juan José Cueto (DOM)	26 May 1992 (age 34)
Mikel Elorza (DOM)	7 January 1991 (age 35)
William Guzmán (DOM)	6 April 1992 (age 34)
Francisco Mancebo (ESP)	9 March 1976 (age 50)
Junior Antonio Marte (DOM)	23 December 1996 (age 29)
Diego Milán (DOM)	10 July 1985 (age 41)
Adrian Núñez (DOM)	1 October 1991 (age 34)
Jesús Alberto Rubio (ESP)	25 January 1992 (age 34)
Ignacio Sarabia (MEX)	15 July 1983 (age 43)
Albert Torres (ESP)	26 April 1990 (age 36)

== Major wins ==
2015
Stage 7 Tour Cycliste International de la Guadeloupe, Diego Milan
Stage 9 Tour Cycliste International de la Guadeloupe, Antonio Pedrero
Tobago Cycling Classic, Adderlyn Cruz

2016
Dominican Republic Time Trial Championships, William Guzman
Dominican Republic Road Race Championships, Juan José Cueto

2017
Stage 2 Vuelta Independencia Nacional Republica Dominicana, Albert Torres
Stage 1 Tour Cycliste International de la Guadeloupe, Julio Alberto Amores

2018
Prologue Tour Cycliste International de la Guadeloupe, Jose Alfredo Aguirre

== National champions ==
2016
Dominican Republic Road Race Championship, Juan José Cueto
Dominican Republic Time Trial Championship, William Guzmán
