= Aero Cycling Team =

Dominican cycling team

Team information
- Registered: Dominican Republic
- Founded: 2014
- Discipline: Road

Key personnel
- Team manager: Vero Antonio Moreno

Team name history
- 2014–: Aero Cycling Team

The Aero Cycling Team is a Dominican cycling team focusing on road bicycle racing.

== History ==
The team won in 2017 the elite national championships of the Dominican Republic, with Nelson Sánchez winning the road race and Augusto Sánchez the time trial.

== Team roster ==
As of 07 April 2015.

Rider	Date of birth
Wellington Canela (DOM)	29 November 1996 (age 29)
Adderlyn Cruz (DOM)	14 November 1991 (age 34)
Charli Hernández (DOM)	3 July 1986 (age 40)
Rafael Merán (DOM)	30 July 1987 (age 39)
Anthony Rodríguez Morel (DOM)	8 October 1992 (age 33)
Augusto Sánchez (DOM)	19 December 1983 (age 42)
Nelson Sánchez (DOM)	24 June 1982 (age 44)
Norlandy Tavera (DOM)	17 November 1989 (age 36)

== Major results ==
2016
Overall Vuelta a la Independencia Nacional, Nelson Sánchez

Stage 1 (TTT)
Stages 3 & 4, Nelson Sánchez
Stage 5, Norlandy Tavera

2017
Overall Vuelta a la Independencia Nacional, Nelson Sánchez

Stage 1 (TTT)
Stage 7, Nelson Sánchez

== National champions ==
2015
Dominican Republic National Time Trial Championships: Rafael Merán
Dominican Republic National Road Race Championships: Norlandy Tavera

2017
Dominican Republic National Time Trial Championships: Augusto Sánchez
Dominican Republic National Road Race Championships: Nelson Sánchez
