= Yaya Diallo (disambiguation) =

Yaya Diallo may refer to:

- Yaya Diallo, a Malian drummer.
- Yaya Diallo (cyclist), Malian cyclist.
- Alpha Yaya Diallo (artist), guitarist and composer now based in Vancouver, Canada
- Alpha Yaya Diallo (politician), current member of the CNDD Military junta in Guinea
