= Diego Milán =

Spanish-born Dominican road bicycle racer

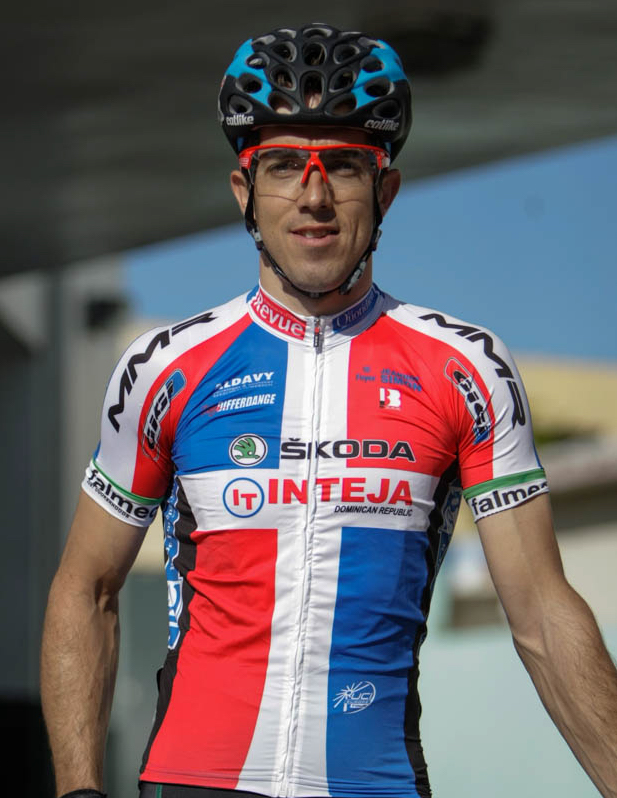
- Milán in 2014

Personal information
- Full name: Diego Milán Jiménez
- Born: 10 July 1985 (age 41) Almansa, Spain
- Height: 1.8 m (5 ft 11 in)
- Weight: 67 kg (148 lb)

Cycling career
- Sport: Cycling
- Current team: Inteja Imca
- Discipline: Road
- Role: Rider

Amateur teams
- 2010: Areperos
- 2012–2013: Aro & Pedal–Inteja
- 2020–2021: Team Inteja
- 2021–2022: C.D. Yourbike–Almansa
- 2022: Inteja Imca DCT
- 2023: Suministros Dama
- 2023–: Inteja Imca DCT

Professional teams
- 2006–2007: Grupo Nicolás Mateos
- 2008–2009: Acqua & Sapone–Caffè Mokambo
- 2011: Caja Rural
- 2013–2014: Differdange–Losch
- 2015–2019: Inteja–MMR Dominican Cycling Team

Major wins
- National Road Race Championships (2013, 2014)

Diego Milán Jiménez (born 10 July 1985) is a Spanish-born Dominican road bicycle racer, who rides for Dominican amateur team Inteja Imca. Milán has also competed for Acqua & Sapone–Caffè Mokambo, Caja Rural and Differdange–Losch.

Since 2012, Milán competes under a licence from the Dominican Republic, having been born in Spain.

== Professional career ==
Born in Almansa, Spain, Milán won the Dominican Republic National Road Race Championships in 2013 and 2014.

Milán was the first Dominican cyclist to ever participate in the Olympic Games when he participated in the individual road race, but did not finish.

Milán was fourth overall during the 2015 Grand Prix Cycliste de Saguenay, riding for the Inteja–MMR Dominican Cycling Team.

== Major results ==
2006
3rd Clásica Memorial Txuma
7th Overall Vuelta a la Comunidad de Madrid

1st Stage 2

2007
5th Liège–Bastogne–Liège U23
5th Circuito de Getxo
7th Clásica Memorial Txuma
2008
1st Stage 2 Vuelta a La Rioja
1st Stage 2 GP Paredes Rota dos Móveis
2009
5th Overall Tour of Turkey
2010
5th Overall Vuelta a la Independencia Nacional
6th Overall Tour do Rio
2011
5th Circuito de Getxo
7th Clásica de Almería
2012
7th Overall Vuelta a la Independencia Nacional

1st Points classification
1st Stages 1, 4 & 5

7th Bucks County Classic
2013
1st Road race, National Road Championships
1st Stage 6 Tour de Beauce
8th Overall Tour de Guadeloupe

1st Stages 4 & 9

2014
1st Road race, National Road Championships
1st Stage 5 Tour de Guadeloupe
2015
2nd Road race, National Road Championships
2nd Overall Tour de Guadeloupe

1st Stage 7

4th Overall Grand Prix Cycliste de Saguenay
5th Overall Vuelta a la Independencia Nacional
10th Road race, Pan American Games
2016
5th Overall Vuelta a la Independencia Nacional
2017
7th Road race, Pan American Road Championships
7th Overall Tour de Guadeloupe

1st Points classification
1st Mountains classification

7th Overall Grand Prix Cycliste de Saguenay
2018
4th Winston-Salem Cycling Classic
8th Overall Tour de Guadeloupe
9th Overall Tour du Maroc
2019
1st Stage 5 Tour de Beauce
3rd Road race, National Road Championships
3rd Overall Grand Prix Cycliste de Saguenay
5th Overall Tour de Guadeloupe
6th Overall Tour du Maroc
6th Winston-Salem Cycling Classic
