= Natasha Méndez =

Dominican cyclist

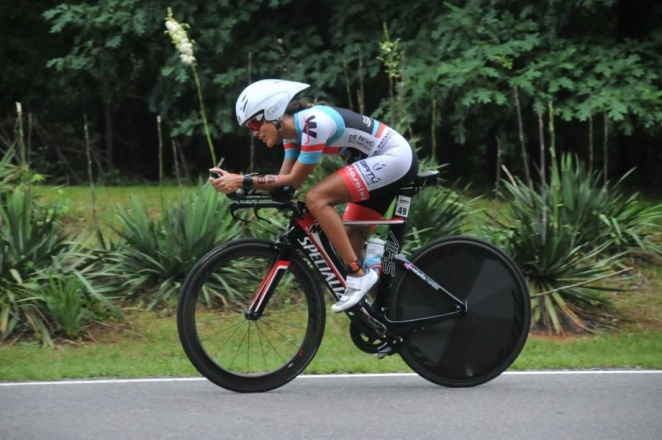
- Méndez competing in an Ironman 70.3 event in 2016

Personal information
- Full name: Natasha Méndez Bonelly
- Born: 29 May 1990 (age 36) Santiago de los Caballeros, Dominican Republic

Sport
- Sport: Triathlon; Athletics; Road cycling

Achievements and titles
- National finals: Dominican Republic National Time Trial Championships (2016)
Medal record
Athletics
Representing Dominican Republic
Dominican Military Games
| Bronze medal – third place | 2016 Dominican Military Games | 5000 metres |
| Bronze medal – third place | 2018 Dominican Military Games | 10,000 metres |
| Bronze medal – third place | 2018 Dominican Military Games | Half marathon |

Natasha Méndez Bonelly (born May 29, 1990) is a professional triathlete, athlete and road cyclist from the Dominican Republic. She won the Dominican Republic National Time Trial Championships in 2016.

== Career ==
Méndez was born in Santiago de los Caballeros.

=== 2014 ===
Méndez won the silver medal at the Dominican Republic National Time Trial Championships with a 35:49 time for the 20-kilometre (12-mile) course, and also won silver in the Dominican Republic National Road Race Championships, being defeated both times by the veteran Juana Fernández.

=== 2015 ===
Méndez competed in March in the World Triathlon Corporation series Ironman 70.3 in Monterrey, Mexico, with a finishing time of 4:49:23. She participated in the ITU event Ibarra CAMTRI Triathlon American Cup having a 29:30 swim before ending her race. Shortly after that, she won the silver medal in the Dominican Republic National Time Trial Championships, in a time of 31:55 and representing la Caya. She won the Olympic distance, local event at the Dominican Republic, the TRI Sports Summer Fest with a time of 2:14:32. By running the 5k category along with children and lending her image for the Casa de Campo Marathon, she supported the Hogar del Niño orphanage sponsored by local resort, located in La Romana, Dominican Republic.

=== 2016 ===
She started the year participating in the Ironman 70.3 in Panama, ranking in the 14th place in 4:35 and winning 80 points climbing to the 181 in the WTC world rankings. Méndez took the bronze medal in the SDQ 10k running competition held in Santo Domingo. In April she received the athlete of year award in Triathlon by the Santiago de los Caballeros Guild of Sport Writers, along with Jorge Manuel Díaz. Later, in May and June, she conquered the 19th place in Chattanooga and 11th place of Female Pros at Raleigh 70.3 both with a 4:51 time. She won the Dominican Republic National Time Trial Championships in June, after winning the 30k Mirador Sur Park course with a time of 30:59. She won the bronze medal in the Dominican Republic National Road Race Championships two days later, riding in Santiago de los Caballeros. In July, she competed the Budapest 70.3 in Hungary, finishing in 8th place in the Female PRO category and obtaining her first Top 10 finish, with a time of 4:34.

== Major results ==
=== Cycling ===
2014
National Road Championships

2nd Time trial
2nd Road race

2015
2nd Time trial, National Road Championships
2016
National Road Championships

1st Time trial
3rd Road race

2019
3rd Time trial, National Road Championships

=== Athletics ===
2016
3rd 5000 metres, Dominican Republic Military Games
2018
Dominican Republic Military Games

3rd 10,000 metres
3rd Half marathon
