= 2007 national road cycling championships =

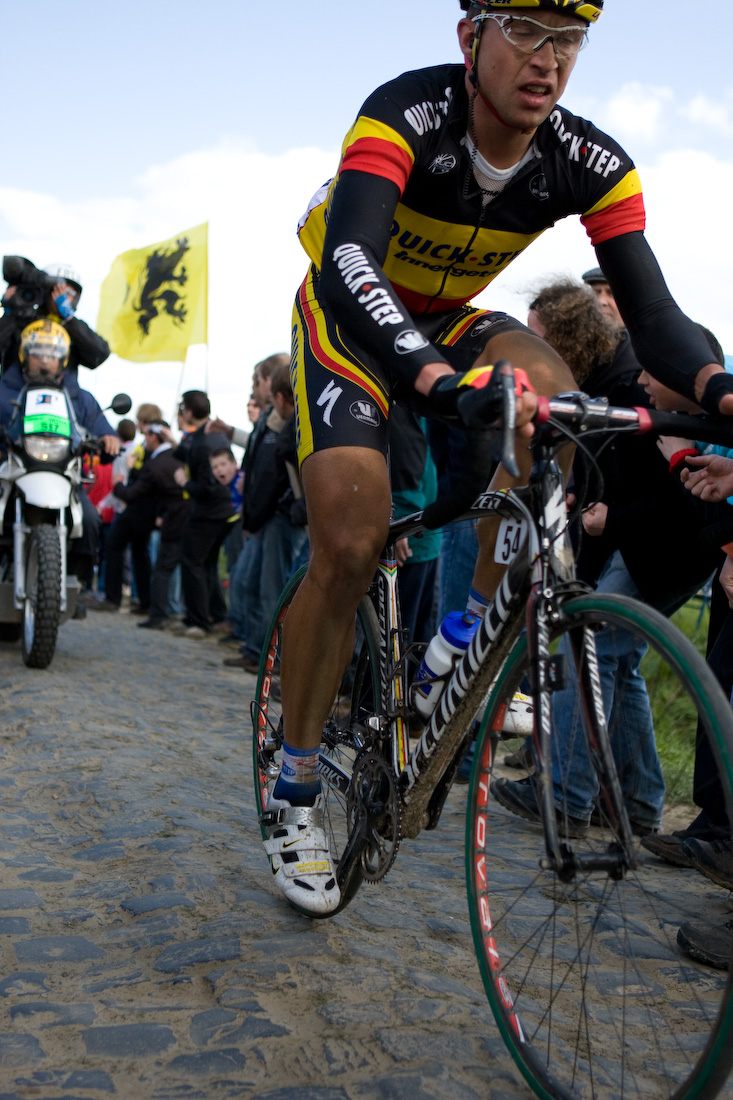
Stijn Devolder won the Belgian National Road Race Championships and wore the Belgian champion jersey the following year

The 2007 national road cycling championships took place throughout the year, with the majority taking place in late June and early July, although there are some exceptions. The National Championships are an annual event and have taken place for many years.

== Jerseys ==
The winner of each national championship wears the national jersey in all their races for the next year in the respective discipline, apart from the World Championships. The jerseys tend to represent the countries' flag or use the colours from it.

== Cancellations ==
The British championships were cancelled following torrential rain in the week leading up to the event, causing flooding nearby where the races were to be held. It was rescheduled after the Tour de France.

The Czech and Slovakian joint Time Trial championships were cancelled when the route became a detour for a major motorway nearby, which had been blocked due to an accident.

== 2007 Champions ==
| Country | Men's Elite | | Women's Elite | | Men's U-23 | |
| Country | Road Race | Time Trial | Road Race | Time Trial | Road Race | Time Trial |
|---|---|---|---|---|---|---|
| Argentina | Raul Turano | Guillermo Bruneta | | Jesica Compiano | Jesica Compiano | Emanuel Saldaño |
| Australia | Darren Lapthorne | Nathan O'Neill | Katie Mactier | Carla Ryan | Wesley Sulzberger | Zakkari Dempster |
| Austria | C. Pfannberger | Rupert Probst | Daniela Pintarelli | Christiane Soeder | | |
| Belarus | Branislau Samoilau | Andrei Kunitski | Tatsiana Sharakova | Tatsiana Sharakova | Sergey Sakovets | Sergey Popok |
| Belgium | Stijn Devolder | Leif Hoste | Ludivine Henrion | An Van Rie | | Francis De Greef |
| Bolivia | Horacio Gallardo | Alberto Maizares | | | | |
| Brazil | Nilceu Santos | Pedro Nicacio | V. Bento Pardial | Janildes F. Silva | | |
| Burkina Faso | Saïdou Sanfo | | | | | |
| Canada | Cameron Evans | Ryder Hesjedal | Gina Grain | Anne Samplonius | Christian Meier | David Veilleux |
| Chile | Gonzalo Garrido | Jose Medina | | | | |
| Costa Rica | Juan Carlos Rojas | Nieves Carrasco | Marcela Rubiano | Alia Cardinales | | |
| Croatia | Tomislav Dančulović | Matija Kvasina | | | Kristijan Đurasek | |
| Cyprus | Christos Kythraiotis | Christos Kythraiotis | Demetra Antoniou | Marina Heodorou | | |
| Czech Republic | Tomáš Bucháček | Stanislav Kozubek | Martina Ružicková | Tereza Huríková | Jakub Novák | Jirí Bareš |
| Denmark | Alex Rasmussen | Lars Bak | Karina Hegelund | Trine Schmidt | Thomas Kristiansen | André Steensen |
| (Dominican Republic) Dominican Rep. | Ismael Sánchez | Augusto Sánchez | Juana Fernández | Juana Fernández | Erizon Peña | Erizon Peña |
| Ecuador | | Juan C. Montenegro | | | | |
| Estonia | Erki Pütsep | Jaan Kirsipuu | Grete Treier | Grete Treier | Tanel Kangert | Gert Jõeäär |
| Finland | Matti Pajari | Matti Helminen | Tiina Nieminen | Tiina Nieminen | | |
| France | Christophe Moreau | Benoît Vaugrenard | Edwige Pitel | Maryline Salvetat | | |
| Germany | Fabian Wegmann | Bert Grabsch | Luise Keller | Hanka Kupfernagel | | Marcel Kittel |
| Hungary | Bálint Szeghalmi | László Bodrogi | | | | |
| Iran | Ghader Mizbani | Hossein Askari | | | | |
| Ireland | David O'Loughlin | Nicolas Roche | Siobhan Dervan | Louise Moriarty | Mark Cassidy | Paul Brady |
| Israel | Gal Tsachor | Gali Ronen | | | | |
| Italy | Giovanni Visconti | Luca Ascani | Eva Lechner | Vera Carrara | | Adriano Malori |
| Japan | Yukiya Arashiro | Kazuya Okazaki | Miho Oki | Miho Oki | Jyumpei Murakami | |
| Kazakhstan | Maxim Iglinsky | A. Dyachenko | Zulfia Zabirova | Zulfia Zabirova | | |
| Latvia | Aleksejs Saramotins | Raivis Belohvoščiks | | | | |
| Lithuania | R. Navardauskas | Gediminas Bagdonas | Rasa Leleivytė | Edita Pučinskaitė | | |
| Luxembourg | Benoît Joachim | Christian Poos | Suzie Godart | Christine Majerus | Ben Gastauer | Kim Michely |
| Moldova | Oleg Berdos | Serghei Țvetcov | | | | |
| Namibia | Erik Hoffman | Erik Hoffman | | | | |
| Netherlands | Koos Moerenhout | Stef Clement | Marlijn Binnendijk | Ellen van Dijk | Tom Leezer | Lars Boom |
| Norway | Alexander Kristoff | Edvald B. Hagen | Kristine Saastad | Anita Valen | Frederik Wilmann | |
| New Zealand | Julian Dean | Glen Chadwick | Alison Shanks | Alison Shanks | Matthew Haydock | Matthew Haydock |
| Paraguay | | | Karen Doljak | Karen Doljak | | |
| Poland | Tomasz Marczyński | Łukasz Bodnar | Maja Włoszczowska | Joanna Ignasiak | | |
| Portugal | Cândido Barbosa | Ricardo Martins | Irina Coelho | Isabel Caetano | | |
| Russia | Vladislav Borisov | Vladimir Gusev | Natalia Boyarskaya | Tatiana Antoshina | | Dmitri Sokolov |
| Serbia | | | Dragana Kovačević | Jovana Krtinic | | |
| Slovakia | Martin Riška | Cancelled | | Cancelled | Ivan Viglaský | Cancelled |
| Slovenia | Tadej Valjavec | Gregor Gazvoda | not organized | Jelka Rakuš | Jernej Senekovič | Kristijan Koren |
| Spain | Joaquim Rodríguez | Iván Gutiérrez | Maribel Moreno | María Isabel MorenoMaribel Moreno | Carlos Delgado | Rafael Serrano |
| South Africa | Malcolm Lange | David George | Ronel Van Wyk | Ronel Van Wyk | | |
| Sweden | Magnus Bäckstedt | Gustav Larsson | Angelica Agerteg | Emma Johansson | | Viktor Holfve |
| Turkey | Uğur Marmara | | | | Recep Ünalan | |
| Switzerland | Beat Zberg | Fabian Cancellara | Sereina Trachsel | Karin Thürig | | Mathias Frank |
| Ukraine | V. Zagorodniy | Volodymyr Dyudya | | | | |
| (United Arab Emirates) UAE | Saeed Ali Ahmed | Alsabbagh Humaid | | | | |
| United Kingdom | David Millar | David Millar | Nicole Cooke | Wendy Houvenaghel | Rob Partridge | Matt Brammeier |
| United States | Levi Leipheimer | Dave Zabriskie | Mara Abbott | Kristin Armstrong | Max Jenkins | Nick Frey |
| Uzbekistan | Ruslan Karimov | Vladimir Tuychiev | | | | |
| Venezuela | Tomás Gil | José Rujano | Daniela García | Karelia Machado | | |
| Zimbabwe | Dave Martin | | | | | |
