= 2014 national road cycling championships =

The 2014 national road cycling championships began in Australia with the time trial event (both men and women) on January 8, as is tradition.

== Jerseys ==
The winner of each national championship wears the national jersey in all their races for the next year in the respective discipline, apart from the World Championships and the Olympics, or unless they are wearing a category leader's jersey in a stage race. Most national champion jerseys tend to represent a country's flag or use the colours from it. Jerseys may also feature traditional sporting colours of a country that are not derived from a national flag, such as the green and gold on the jerseys of Australian national champions.

== 2014 champions ==
=== Men's Elite ===
Country	Men's Elite Road Race Champion	Champion's Team at road	Men's Elite Time Trial Champion	Champion's Team at time
Albania	Kamberaj Xhuliano		Nikaj Iltjan	
Algeria	Abdelbasset Hannachi	Groupement Sportif Pétrolier Algérie	Azzedine Lagab	Groupement Sportif Pétrolier Algérie
Andorra	Jyme Bridges		David Albós	
Angola	Igor Silva		Igor Silva	Banco BIC–Carmim
Antigua and Barbuda			André Simon	
Argentina	Daniel Díaz	San Luis Somos Todos	Laureano Rosas	
Aruba				
Australia	Simon Gerrans	Orica–GreenEDGE	Michael Hepburn	Orica–GreenEDGE
Austria	Riccardo Zoidl	Trek Factory Racing	Matthias Brändle	IAM Cycling
Azerbaijan	Elchin Asadov	Synergy Baku	Elchin Asadov	Synergy Baku
Bahamas				
Barbados	Philip Clarke		Russell Elcock	
Belarus	Yauheni Hutarovich	Ag2r–La Mondiale	Kanstantsin Sivtsov	Team Sky
Belgium	Jens Debusschere	Lotto–Belisol	Kristof Vandewalle	Trek Factory Racing
Belize	Edgar Arana		Edgar Arana	
Benin	Augustin Amoussouvi			
Bermuda	Shannon Lawrence		Shannon Lawrence	
Bolivia	Óscar Soliz	Movistar Team América	Óscar Soliz	Movistar Team América
Bosnia and Herzegovina	Mujo Kurtovic		Nikica Atlagic	
Botswana				
Brazil	Antonio Garnero	Funvic Brasilinvest–São José dos Campos	Pedro Nicacio	Funvic Brasilinvest–São José dos Campos
British Virgin Islands	Shaquil Samuel (Note: Samuel finished fourth; the race was won by Orano Andrews from Saint Vincent and The Grenadines.)			
Brunei				
Bulgaria	Nikolay Mihaylov	CCC–Polsat–Polkowice		
Burkina Faso	Salfo Bikienga			
Cambodia	Kim Yura			
Canada	Svein Tuft	Orica–GreenEDGE	Svein Tuft	Orica–GreenEDGE
Cayman Islands				
Chile	Lino Arriagada		Jonathan Guzman	
China	Zhao Jingbiao	Hengxiang Cycling Team	Wu Nan	Giant-Champion System Pro Cycling
Colombia	Miguel Ángel Rubiano	Colombia	Pedro Herrera	
Democratic Republic of the Congo	Fiston Dukwa Mbumba			
Costa Rica	Juan Carlos Rojas		Josué González	Coopenae-Movistar-Economy
Ivory Coast	Bassirou Konte			
Croatia	Radoslav Rogina	Adria Mobil	Bruno Maltar	Adria Mobil
Cuba	Arnold Alcolea		Yeinier López	
Curaçao	Manuel Seintje			
Cyprus	Armanto Archimandritis		Michael Christodoulos	
Czech Republic	Zdeněk Štybar	Omega Pharma–Quick-Step	Jan Bárta	NetApp–Endura
Denmark	Michael Valgren	Tinkoff–Saxo	Rasmus Quaade	Team TreFor–Blue Water
Djibouti				
Dominican Republic	Diego Milán	Differdange–Losch	Augusto Sánchez	Differdange–Losch
Ecuador	Byron Guamá	Team Ecuador	José Ragonessi	Team Ecuador
El Salvador	Rafael Carías		Rafael Carías	
Eritrea	Awit Gebremedhin		Natnael Berhane	Team Europcar
Estonia	Alo Jakin	BigMat–Auber 93	Gert Jõeäär	Cofidis
Ethiopia	Tsgabu Grmay	MTN–Qhubeka	Tsgabu Grmay	MTN–Qhubeka
Finland	Jussi Veikkanen	FDJ.fr	Samuel Pökälä	
Fiji	Jacob Salcone		Jacob Salcone	
France	Arnaud Démare	FDJ.fr	Sylvain Chavanel	IAM Cycling
Gabon	Geoffroy Ngandamba		Geoffroy Ngandamba	
Georgia	Giorgi Nareklishvili		Besik Gavasheli	
Germany	André Greipel	Lotto–Belisol	Tony Martin	Omega Pharma–Quick-Step
Greece	Georgios Bouglas	SP Tableware	Polychronis Tzortzakis	
Guatemala	Nervin Jiatz	Insta Cofi de Café Quetzal	Manuel Rodas	Cable DX-Decorabaños
Guyana	Geron Williams		Raynauth Jeffrey	
Hong Kong	Cheung King-Lok	HKSI Pro Cycling Team	Cheung King-Lok	HKSI Pro Cycling Team
Hungary	Balázs Rózsa	Utensilnord	Gábor Fejes	
Iceland	Ingvar Omarsson		Hakon Sigurdsson	
India	Shreedhar Savanur		Naveen John	
Indonesia	Endra Wijaya			
Iran	Rahim Ememi	Pishgaman Yazd	Alireza Haghi	Tabriz Petrochemical Team
Ireland	Ryan Mullen	An Post–Chain Reaction	Michael Hutchinson	
Israel	Niv Libner	Amore & Vita–Selle SMP	Yoav Bear	
Italy	Vincenzo Nibali	Astana	Adriano Malori	Movistar Team
Jamaica	Oneil Samuels			
Japan	Junya Sano		Fumiyuki Beppu	Trek Factory Racing
Kazakhstan	Ilya Davidenok	Continental Team Astana	Daniil Fominykh	Astana
Kyrgyzstan				
Latvia	Andris Vosekalns	Rietumu–Delfin	Gatis Smukulis	Team Katusha
Lesotho	Phetetso Monese			
Lebanon	Zaher El Hage		Rachid Elias Abou	
Liechtenstein			Ewald Wolf	
Lithuania	Paulius Šiškevičius		Ramūnas Navardauskas	Garmin–Sharp
Luxembourg	Fränk Schleck	Trek Factory Racing	Laurent Didier	Trek Factory Racing
Macedonia	Stefan Petrovski		Veli Sadiki	
Madagascar	Zouzou Andriafenomananiaina		Stéphane Lacas	
Malawi				
Malaysia				
Mali	Diakaridia Sangare (Note: The Malian championships was based upon a combined ranking of an individual time trial and the road race.)			
Malta	Maurice Formosa		Christian Formosa	
Mauritius	Steward Pharmasse		Mike Chong Chin	
Mongolia				
Moldova	Sergiu Cioban		Sergiu Cioban	
Morocco	Adil Jelloul	Skydive Dubai Pro Cycling	Soufiane Haddi	Skydive Dubai Pro Cycling
Mexico	Ignacio Sarabia		Bernardo Colex	
Namibia	Raul Seibeb		Till Drobisch	
Netherlands	Sebastian Langeveld	Garmin–Sharp	Tom Dumoulin	Giant–Shimano
New Zealand	Hayden Roulston	Trek Factory Racing	Taylor Gunman	Avanti Racing Team
Nicaragua			Walter Gaitán	
Nigeria				
Norway	Tormod Jacobsen	Team Øster Hus–Ridley	Reidar Borgersen	Team Joker
Panama	Fernando Urena		Yelko Gómez	
Pakistan	Nisar Ahmad Kasi		Ali Muhammad Sabir	
Paraguay	Heiko Grobenstieg		Gustavo Miño	Start–Trigon Cycling Team
Peru	Alonso Gamero		Alonso Gamero	
Philippines				
Poland	Bartłomiej Matysiak	CCC–Polsat–Polkowice	Michał Kwiatkowski	Omega Pharma–Quick-Step
Portugal	Nelson Oliveira	Lampre–Merida	Nelson Oliveira	Lampre–Merida
Puerto Rico	Efren Ortega	InCycle-Predator Components		
Romania	Zoltan Sipos		Andrei Nechita	MG Kvis–Trevigiani
Russia	Alexander Porsev	Team Katusha	Anton Vorobyev	Team Katusha
Rwanda	Valens Ndayisenga		Valens Ndayisenga	
Saint Lucia				
Saint Vincent and the Grenadines				
Saint Kitts and Nevis				
San Marino				
Senegal	Abdoulaye Thiam			
Serbia	Miloš Borisavljevic		Gabor Kasa	Kastro Team
Seychelles				
Singapore				
Sierra Leone				
Slovakia	Peter Sagan	Cannondale	Peter Velits	BMC Racing Team
Slovenia	Matej Mugerli	Adria Mobil	Gregor Gazvoda	Gebrüder Weiss–Oberndorfer
Sri Lanka	Buddhika Warnakulasooriya		Buddhika Warnakulasooriya	
South Africa	Louis Meintjes	MTN–Qhubeka	Daryl Impey	Orica–GreenEDGE
South Korea	Seo Joon-Yong	KSPO		
Spain	Jon Izagirre	Movistar Team	Alejandro Valverde	Movistar Team
Suriname	Murwin Arumjo		Ruben Vismale	
Sweden	Michael Olsson	Team Ringeriks–Kraft	Alexander Gingsjö	
Switzerland	Martin Elmiger	IAM Cycling	Fabian Cancellara	Trek Factory Racing
Taiwan	Feng Chun-kai	Team Gusto		
Tanzania				
Thailand	Peerapol Chawchiangkwang		Phuchong Sai-Udomsin	OCBC Singapore Continental Cycling Team
Togo				
Tunisia	Rafaâ Chtioui	Skydive Dubai Pro Cycling	Hassan Ben Nasr	
Turkey	Feritcan Şamlı	Torku Şekerspor	Ahmet Örken	Torku Şekerspor
Trinidad and Tobago	Gevan Samuel			
Uganda	David Matovu			
Ukraine	Vitaliy Buts	Kolss Cycling Team	Andriy Vasylyuk	Kolss Cycling Team
United Kingdom	Peter Kennaugh	Team Sky	Bradley Wiggins	Team Sky
United Arab Emirates	Yousif Banihammad		Yousif Banihammad	
Uruguay	Emanuel Yanes		Néstor Pías	
United States	Eric Marcotte	Team SmartStop	Taylor Phinney	BMC Racing Team
United States Virgin Islands				
Uzbekistan	Ruslan Karimov	RTS–Santic Racing Team	Muradjan Khalmuratov	Terengganu Cycling Team
Venezuela	Xavier Quevedo		Carlos Gálviz	
Vietnam				
Zimbabwe	Dave Martin		Dave Martin	

=== Women's ===
Country	Women's Elite Road Race Champion	Champion's team at time	Women's Elite Time Trial Champion	Champion's team at time
Albania				
Algeria				
Andorra				
Angola				
Antigua and Barbuda	Tamiko Butler	WyndyMilla Reynolds		
Argentina	Valeria Müller		Valeria Müller	
Aruba				
Australia	Gracie Elvin	Orica–AIS	Felicity Wardlaw	
Austria	Jacqueline Hahn	Bigla Cycling Team		
Azerbaijan				
Bahamas				
Barbados				
Belarus	Alena Amialiusik	Astana BePink Women Team		
Belgium	Jolien D'Hoore	Lotto–Belisol Ladies	Ann-Sophie Duyck	
Belize			Kaya Cattouse	
Bermuda	Nicole Mitchell		Nicole Mitchell	
Bolivia				
Bosnia and Herzegovina	Lejla Tanović		Lejla Tanović	
Botswana				
Brazil			Ana Paula Polegatch	
British Virgin Islands				
Brunei				
Bulgaria				
Burkina Faso				
Canada	Leah Kirchmann	Optum–Kelly Benefit Strategies	Leah Kirchmann	Optum–Kelly Benefit Strategies
Cayman Islands				
Chile				
China				
Colombia	Valentina Paniagua		Serika Gulumá	Vaiano Fondriest
Democratic Republic of the Congo				
Costa Rica	Paula Herrera		Edith Guillén	
Ivory Coast				
Croatia	Mia Radotić	BTC City Ljubljana	Mia Radotić	BTC City Ljubljana
Cuba	Arlenis Sierra		Yoanka González	
Curaçao				
Cyprus				
Czech Republic	Martina Sáblíková			
Denmark	Amalie Dideriksen			
Dominican Republic	Juana Fernández	Arco Iris Cycling Team	Juana Fernández	Arco Iris Cycling Team
Ecuador	Jazmin Taborda		Jazmin Taborda	
El Salvador	Xenia Estrada		Xenia Estrada	
Eritrea	Wehazit Kidane		Wehazit Kidane	
Estonia	Liisi Rist	S.C. Michela Fanini Rox		
Finland	Lotta Lepistö	Bigla Cycling Team		
France	Pauline Ferrand-Prévot	Rabobank-Liv Woman Cycling Team		
Gabon				
Georgia				
Germany	Lisa Brennauer	Specialized–lululemon		
Greece	Barvara Fasoh		Athina Chatzistyli	
Guatemala	Cintia Lee		Cintia Lee	
Guyana				
Hong Kong	Zhao Juan Meng		Wong Wan Yiu	China Chongming – Giant Pro Cycling
Hungary	Diana Szuromine		Veronika Anna Kormos	
Iceland				
Iran	Maryam Jalaliyeh		Maryam Jalaliyeh	
Ireland				
Israel	Paz Bash		Paz Bash	
Italy	Elena Cecchini	Estado de México–Faren Kuota	Elisa Longo Borghini	Team Hitec Products
Jamaica				
Japan	Mayuko Hagiwara	Wiggle–Honda		
Kazakhstan				
Kyrgyzstan				
Latvia			Dana Rozlapa	
Lebanon				
Liechtenstein				
Lithuania	Aušrinė Trebaitė			
Luxembourg	Christine Majerus	Boels–Dolmans	Christine Majerus	Boels–Dolmans
Macedonia				
Madagascar				
Malaysia				
Mali				
Malta				
Mauritius				
Mongolia				
Moldova				
Morocco	Fatima El Hiyani			
Mexico	Ana Teresa Casas		Verónica Leal	
Namibia				
Netherlands details (time trial)	Iris Slappendel	Rabobank-Liv Woman Cycling Team	Annemiek van Vleuten	Rabobank-Liv Woman Cycling Team
New Zealand	Rushlee Buchanan		Jaime Nielsen	
Nicaragua				
Norway	Camilla Indset Sorgjerd		Thrude Natholmen	
Panama	Yineth Cubilla		Emma Jorge	
Pakistan				
Paraguay	Agua Marina Espínola			
Peru				
Poland	Paulina Guz		Eugenia Bujak	BTC City Ljubljana
Portugal	Celina Carpinteiro		Katarina Larsson	
Puerto Rico	Donelys Carino			
Romania	Lavinia Rolea			
Russia	Tatiana Antoshina	RusVelo	Tatiana Antoshina	RusVelo
Rwanda	Jeanne Girubuntu			
Saint Lucia				
Saint Vincent and the Grenadines				
Saint Kitts and Nevis				
Serbia	Jelena Eric		Jelena Eric	
Singapore				
Slovakia	Monika Kadlecová			
Slovenia	Polona Batagelj	BTC City Ljubljana	Polona Batagelj	BTC City Ljubljana
South Africa	Ashleigh Moolman	Team Hitec Products	Ashleigh Moolman	Team Hitec Products
South Korea	Reum Ah Na			
Spain	Anna Ramírez Bauxel	Bizkaia–Durango		
Suriname				
Sweden	Emma Johansson	Orica–AIS		
Switzerland	Mirjam Gysling		Linda Indergand	
Taiwan				
Thailand	Supaksorn Nuntana			
Togo				
Tunisia	Nour Dissem		Nour Dissem	
Turkey	Semra Yetiş		Semra Yetiş	
Trinidad and Tobago				
Uganda				
Ukraine	Tetyana Ryabchenko	S.C. Michela Fanini Rox	Tetyana Ryabchenko	S.C. Michela Fanini Rox
United Kingdom	Laura Trott	Wiggle–Honda	Emma Pooley	Lotto–Belisol Ladies
United Arab Emirates				
Uruguay				
United States	Alison Powers	UnitedHealthcare	Alison Powers	UnitedHealthcare
United States Virgin Islands				
Uzbekistan	Olga Drobysheva		Olga Drobysheva	
Venezuela	Danielys García		Danielys García	
Zimbabwe				

== See also ==
- 2014 in men's road cycling
- 2014 in women's road cycling
