= Maryam Jalaliyeh =

Iranian cyclist

Personal information
- Born: Iran

Cycling career
- Sport: Cycling
- Discipline: Road cycling
- Role: Rider

Maryam Jalaliyeh is a road cyclist from Iran. She became Iranian national road race and time trial champion in 2014.
