= Jazmín Taborda =

Ecuadorian cyclist

Personal information
- Born: Ecuador

Cycling career
- Sport: Cycling
- Discipline: Road cycling

Jazmín Taborda is a road cyclist from Ecuador. She became Ecuadorian national road race and time trial champion in 2014.
