= Paulina Guz =

Polish cyclist

Personal information
- Born: 12 July 1991 (age 35) Poland

Cycling career
- Sport: Cycling
- Discipline: Road cycling

Paulina Guz (born 12 July 1991) is a road cyclist from Poland. She became a national road race champion in 2014.
