= Julio César Herrera =

Cuban cyclist (born 1977)

Personal information
- Born: March 11, 1977 (age 49)
Medal record
Men's track cycling
Representing Cuba
Pan American Games
Gold medal – first place	1999 Winnipeg	Time Trial
Gold medal – first place	2007 Rio de Janeiro	Olympic Sprint
Gold medal – first place	2007 Rio de Janeiro	Team Sprint
Silver medal – second place	1999 Winnipeg	Olympic Sprint
Bronze medal – third place	1999 Winnipeg	Match Sprint
Central American and Caribbean Games
Gold medal – first place	2006 Cartagena	Team Sprint
Silver medal – second place	2006 Cartagena	1km Time Trial
Bronze medal – third place	2006 Cartagena	Sprint

Julio César Herrera Cabrera (born March 11, 1977, in Havana) is a retired male track cyclist from Cuba. He competed for his native country in the 2000 and 2004 Summer Olympics. Herrera won three medals at the 1999 Pan American Games in Winnipeg, Manitoba, Canada.

== Career ==
Herrera won the sprint silver medal and the 1 km time trial bronze in the 2002 Pan American Championships held in Quito, Ecuador.
