= Julio Amores =

Spanish cyclist

Personal information
- Full name: Julio Alberto Amores Palacios
- Born: 12 March 1993 (age 33) Novelda, Spain

Cycling career
- Sport: Cycling
- Current team: U.C. Novelda
- Disciplines: Road; Track
- Role: Rider
- Rider type: Endurance (track)

Amateur teams
- 2016: Controlpack–Six2
- 2019: Electro Hiper Europa–Ristrasol–Valence
- 2020–: U.C. Novelda

Professional teams
- 2014: Team Ecuador
- 2017: Inteja Dominican Cycling Team
- 2018: Vitus Pro Cycling Team
- 2019: 303Project

Julio Alberto Amores Palacios (born 12 March 1993) is a Spanish road and track cyclist, who currently rides for Spanish amateur team U.C. Novelda. He competed in the scratch event at the 2014 UCI Track Cycling World Championships.
