= Wendy Cruz =

Dominican Republic cyclist (born 1976)

Personal information
- Full name: Wendy Ramón Cruz Martínez
- Born: 7 March 1976 (age 50) Santiago de los Caballeros, Dominican Republic

Cycling career
- Sport: Cycling
- Current team: Santiago–Asocisa
- Discipline: Road
- Role: Rider

Amateur teams
- 2005: Asosica
- 2009: Edenorte–CDP
- 2010: VCSM–Santiago
- 2011: Ciclón Bike
- 2012: Ochoa Finauto
- 2014–2016: Ochoa Finauto
- 2018: Santiago–Asocisa
- 2021: ECC
- 2023–: Santiago–Asocisa

Professional team
- 2006–2008: Caico Cycling Team
Medal record
Men's cycling
Representing the Dominican Republic
Pan American Games
Gold medal – first place	2007 Rio de Janeiro	Road race
Central American and Caribbean Games
Bronze medal – third place	2006 Cartagena	Team pursuit

Wendy Ramón Cruz Martínez (born 7 March 1976 in Santiago de los Caballeros) is a former professional cyclist from the Dominican Republic. He still competes as an amateur, currently riding for Santiago–Asocisa. Nicknamed El Ciclon he won the gold medal in the men's individual road race at the 2007 Pan American Games.

In 2012, Cruz tested positive for erythropoietin (EPO) and received a two-year doping suspension.

== Major results ==
1999
1st Stages 1 & 3 Vuelta a Chiriquí
2000
1st Stages 1, 2 & 7a Vuelta a la Independencia Nacional
1st Prologue Vuelta a Ciclista a Costa Rica
1st Stage 1 Vuelta a Chiriquí
2003
1st Stage 5a Vuelta a la Independencia Nacional
2005
1st Overall Tour of Puerto Rico

1st Stages 1 & 3

1st Stage 5 Vuelta a la Independencia Nacional
9th Road race, Pan American Road Championships
2006
3rd Team pursuit, Central American and Caribbean Games
2007
1st Road race, Pan American Games
1st Stage 3 Vuelta a la Independencia Nacional
1st Stage 9 Vuelta a Chiriquí
2008
1st Road race, National Road Championships
6th Overall Vuelta a la Independencia Nacional

1st Stage 3

2009
2nd Overall Vuelta a la Independencia Nacional
2010
7th San Antonio de Padua Classic
2012
1st Stage 3 Vuelta a la Independencia Nacional
2015
3rd Road race, National Road Championships
