= Paula Herrera =

Costa Rican cyclist

Personal information
- Born: 11 March 1987 (age 39) Costa Rica

Cycling career
- Sport: Cycling
- Discipline: Road cycling
- Role: Rider

Paula Herrera (born 11 March 1987) is a road cyclist from Costa Rica. She became Costa Rican national road race champion in 2014.
