= Richard Ochoa =

Venezuelan cyclist (1984–2015)

Personal information
- Born: February 14, 1984 Valencia, Carabobo, Venezuela
- Died: July 19, 2015 (aged 31) Caracas, Venezuela

Cycling career
- Sport: Cycling
- Disciplines: Road, track

Amateur teams
- 2006–2007: Gobernación Bolivariano Carabobo
- 2009: Gobernación del Zulia
- 2014: Gobernación de Carabobo

Professional team
- 2008: Diquigiovanni–Androni
Medal record
Men's track cycling
Representing Venezuela
Pan American Games
Bronze medal – third place	2007 Rio de Janeiro	Team pursuit
Bronze medal – third place	2007 Rio de Janeiro	Madison
Central American and Caribbean Games
Gold medal – first place	2010 Mayagüez	Scratch race
Gold medal – first place	2006 Cartagena	Points race
Silver medal – second place	2010 Mayagüez	Points race

Richard N. Ochoa Quintero (February 14, 1984 – July 19, 2015) was a Venezuelan professional track and road racing cyclist.

He was killed after being hit by a motorcycle during a training ride.

== Major results ==
2004
Pan American Track Championships

1st Points race
2nd Team pursuit

2005
1st Overall Vuelta al Estado Portugesa

1st Stage 2b

8th Overall Vuelta a Venezuela
2006
1st Points race, Central American and Caribbean Games
1st Overall Vuelta a la Independencia Nacional

1st Stages 3 & 7a

1st Overall Vuelta a Yacambu-Lara

1st Stage 2a

2nd Clasico Ciudad de Valenci
2007
2nd Team pursuit, Pan American Track Championships
2nd Overall Vuelta a Venezuela
Pan American Games

3rd Madison
3rd Team pursuit

2008
1st Stage 7 Vuelta a Venezuela
4th Overall Vuelta Independencia Nacional
2009
1st Stage 4 Vuelta a Lara
3rd Time trial, National Road Championships
2010
Central American and Caribbean Games

1st Scratch
2nd Points race

2011
National Road Championships

3rd Road race
3rd Time trial

2012
National Track Championships

1st Madison (with Maximo Rojas)
1st Points race
1st Team pursuit (with Manuel Briceño, Randall Figueroa and Isaac Yaguaro)
2nd Scratch

2013
1st Madison, National Track Championships (with Manuel Briceño)
