= Norlandy Taveras =

Dominican Republic cyclist

Personal information
- Full name: Norlandy Taveras Sánchez
- Born: November 17, 1989 (age 36) San Juan de la Maguana, Dominican Republic

Cycling career
- Sport: Cycling
- Discipline: Road
- Role: Rider

Amateur teams
- 2015: Finauto–Campagna–CIC
- 2015–2019: Aero Cycling Team

Norlandy Taveras Sánchez (born 17 November 1989 in San Juan) is a Dominican cyclist, who most recently rode for Dominican amateur team Aero Cycling Team.

== Major results ==
2009
1st Stage 2 Vuelta Ciclista Chiapas
2014
3rd Road race, National Road Championships
2015
1st Road race, National Road Championships
1st Stage 7 Vuelta a la Independencia Nacional
2016
Vuelta a la Independencia Nacional

1st Stages 1 (TTT) & 5

2017
1st Stage 1 (TTT) Vuelta a la Independencia Nacional
