= Ismael Sánchez =

Dominican cyclist (born 1982)

Personal information
- Full name: Nelson Ismael Sánchez Jiménez
- Born: 17 June 1982 (age 44) La Vega, Dominican Republic

Cycling career
- Sport: Cycling
- Current team: La Vega; HG Corratec
- Discipline: Road
- Role: Rider

Amateur teams
- 2005–2014: La Vega
- 2015–2020: Aero Cycling Team
- 2019: JB Ropa Deportiva
- 2021–: La Vega
- 2021–: HG Corratec

Major wins
- National Road Race Championship (2007, 2017) Vuelta a la Independencia Nacional (2012, 2016–2017, 2020, 2022)

Nelson Ismael Sánchez Jiménez (born 17 June 1982) is a Dominican cyclist, who currently rides for amateur teams HG Corratec and La Vega. He was the Dominican National Road Race champion in 2007 and 2017 and is a five-time winner of the Vuelta a la Independencia Nacional.

== Career ==
=== 2007 ===
Sánchez won the National Road Race championship.

=== 2017 ===
Sánchez won for the third time the Vuelta a la Independencia Nacional after winning the mountainous Moca - Constanza stage.

He also won for the second time the National Road Race championships.

== Major results ==
2003
7th Overall Vuelta a la Independencia Nacional
2004
4th Overall Tour de Martinique

1st Mountains classification
1st Young rider classification

2005
1st Stages 1, 3 & 8 Tour de Martinique
3rd Overall Vuelta a la Independencia Nacional

1st Stages 2 and 7b

6th Overall Tour du Sénégal
8th Overall Tour de Guadeloupe

1st Stage 7

2006
1st Stage 6 Tour de Martinique
7th Overall Vuelta a El Salvador
2007
1st Road race, National Road Championships
1st Stage 1 Vuelta a la Independencia Nacional
1st Stage 7 (ITT) Vuelta al Ecuador
2nd Overall Vuelta al Valle del Cibao

1st Stage 4

5th Overall Tour de Guadeloupe
2008
1st Stage 2 Vuelta Ciclista a Costa Rica
3rd Vuelta a la Independencia Nacional

1st Stage 3

3rd Overall Vuelta al Valle del Cibao

1st Stage 3

6th Overall Tour de Guadeloupe
2009
4th Overall Vuelta a la Independencia Nacional
7th Overall Tour de Guadeloupe

1st Stage 7

2010
1st Overall Vuelta al Valle del Cibao

1st Stage 3

1st Stage 5 Vuelta a la Independencia Nacional
2011
2nd Overall Pre-Vuelta Independencia

1st Stage 1

5th Overall Vuelta a la Independencia Nacional
2012
1st Overall Vuelta a la Independencia Nacional
2013
1st Stage 5 Vuelta a la Independencia Nacional
2nd Overall Pre-Vuelta Independencia

1st Stages 2 & 4

2014
1st Overall Pre-Vuelta Independencia

1st Stage 2

2015
1st Overall Vuelta al Valle del Cibao

1st Stage 2

2016
1st Overall Vuelta a la Independencia Nacional

1st Stages 1 (TTT), 3 & 4

9th Tobago Cycling Classic
2017
1st Road race, National Road Championships
1st Overall Vuelta a la Independencia Nacional

1st Mountains classification
1st Stages 1 & 7

1st Stage 2 Vuelta a Hispaniola
2019
5th Overall Vuelta a la Independencia Nacional
2020
1st Overall Vuelta a la Independencia Nacional

1st Stages 1 & 5
