= Dominican Republic National Road Race Championships =

Annual cycling road race event

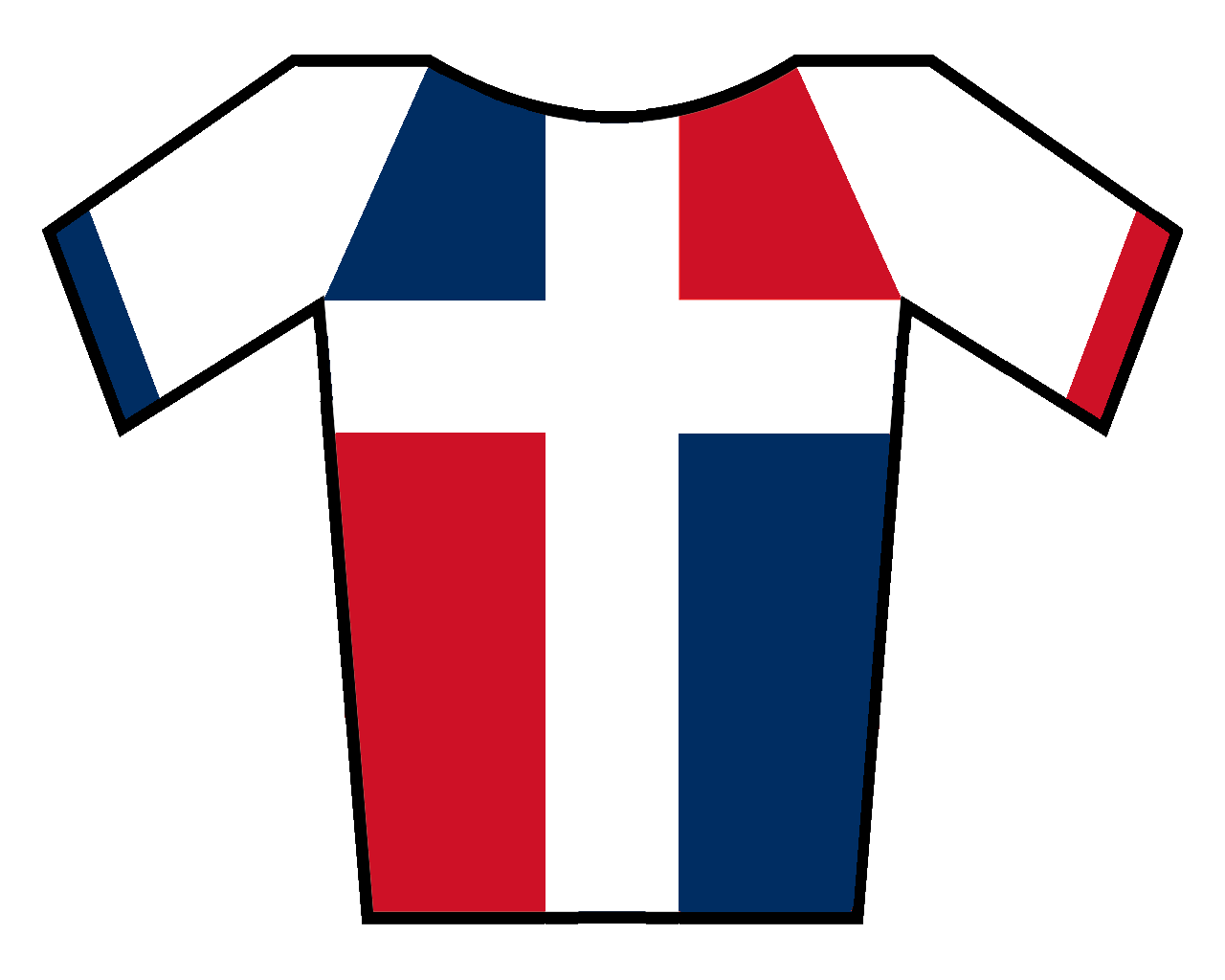
The champions jersey.

The Dominican Republic Road Race Championships are held annually to decide the national cycling champions in the road race discipline, across various categories. This event about the Dominican Republic's Road Cycling Championships is hosted by the Federacion Dominicana de Ciclismo.

== Men ==
=== Elite ===
| Year | Gold | Silver | Bronze | Ref |
| 2006 | Stalin Quiterio | Ramón Merán | Euris Vidal | |
| 2007 | Ismael Sánchez | Jorge Cordero | Euris Vidal | |
| 2008 | Wendy Cruz | Jorge Cordero | Elvis Colón | |
| 2009 | Not held | | | |
| 2010 | Deivy Capellán | Rodny Minier | José Frank Rodríguez | |
| 2011 | Not held | | | |
| 2012 | Braulio García | José Frank Rodríguez | Ismael Sánchez | |
| 2013 | Diego Milán | José Frank Rodríguez | Kelvin Pujols | |
| 2014 | Diego Milán | Adderlyn Cruz | Norlandy Taveras | |
| 2015 | Norlandy Taveras | Diego Milán | Wendy Cruz | |
| 2016 | Juan José Cueto | Anthony Rodríguez Morel | William Guzmán | |
| 2017 | Ismael Sánchez | William Guzmán | Rafael Merán | |
| 2018 | Adrian Núñez | Geovanny García | Stalin Quiterio | |
| 2019 | Geovanny García | Johan Valerio | Diego Milán | |
| 2020 | No race due to the COVID-19 pandemic in the Dominican Republic | | | |
| 2021 | Ramón Adames | Augusto Sánchez | Juan Carlos de Jesús | |
| 2022 | Darnell Lantigua | Jonathan Ogando | Erlin García | |
| 2023 | Pablo Alcides Reyes | Diego Milán | Rudy Germoso | |
| 2024 | Rudy Germoso | Héctor de los Santos | Joel García | |
| 2025 | Jesús Roniel Marte | Steven Polanco | Frankel Rodríguez | |

=== U23 ===
| Year | Gold | Silver | Bronze | Ref |
| 2007 | Erizon Peña | Roger Stantlin | Norlandy Taveras | |
| 2008 | Adderlyn Cruz | William Guzmán | Victor Rojas | |
| 2009 | Not held | | | |
| 2010 | José Payano | Jordalis Hernández | Adderlyn Cruz | |
| 2011 | Not held | | | |
| 2012 | William Guzmán | Carlos Valdez | Ismael Collado | |
| 2013 | Anthony Rodríguez | Ismael Collado | Juan José Cueto | |
| 2014 | Anthony Rodríguez | Juan José Cueto | Josiel Rodríguez | |
| 2015 | Emmanuel Fernández | Leonardo Mazara | Arturo Galiza | |
| 2016 | Emmanuel Nuñez | Welington Canela | Michel Johnson | |
| 2017 | Robinson Paulino | Francisco Muñoz Reyes | Erick Martínez | |
| 2018 | Elías Pérez | Marino Pichardo | Chaunny Ramírez | |
| 2019 | Andy de Jesús | Carlos Manuel Hernández | Steven Polanco | |
| 2020 | No race due to the COVID-19 pandemic in the Dominican Republic | | | |
| 2021 | Frankel Rodriguez | | | |
| 2022 | Jesús Roniel Marte | | | |
| 2023 | Roger Marte | | | |
| 2024 | Nahuel Cruz | Frailyn Bierd | Kennedy Pérez | |
| 2025 | Roger Marte | Ezequiel Bellar | Willy Rosario | |

== Women ==
=== Elite ===
| Year | Gold | Silver | Bronze | Ref |
| 2007 | Juana Fernández | Cesarina Ballenilla | | |
| 2008 | Juana Fernández | Ana Gómez | Anne Guzman | |
| 2014 | Juana Fernández | Natasha Méndez | Ana González | |
| 2015 | Cesarina Ballenilla | Virginia Echavarria | Stephany Contreras | |
| 2016 | Cesarina Ballenilla | Juana Fernández | Natasha Méndez | |
| 2017 | Cesarina Ballenilla | Juana Fernández | Gina Figueroa | |
| 2018 | Cesarina Ballenilla | Juana Fernández | Stephany Contreras | |
| 2019 | Juana Fernández | Kerla de Jesús | Madelin Canela | |
| 2020– 2021 | Not held | | | |
| 2024 | Flor Espiritusanto | Gabriella Tejada | Ana Guzmán | |
| 2025 | Flor Espiritusanto | María Vega | Stephany Contreras | |

=== U23 ===
| Year | Gold | Silver | Bronze | Ref |
| 2024 | Melsey Pérez | Amelia Uribe | Awdrey Martes | |
| 2025 | Melsey Pérez | | | |

== See also ==
- Dominican Republic National Time Trial Championships
