= Liam Holowesko =

American and Bahamian cyclist (born 2000)

Personal information
- Full name: William Thomas Holowesko
- Born: September 1, 2000 (age 26) Nassau, Bahamas

Cycling career
- Sport: Cycling
- Discipline: Road
- Role: Rider

Amateur team
- 2013–2018: Hot Tubes Development

Professional team
- 2019–2022: Hagens Berman Axeon

William Thomas "Liam" Holowesko (born September 1, 2000) is an American-Bahamian professional road cyclist, who most recently rode for UCI Continental team Hagens Berman Axeon.

== Career ==
Born in Nassau, Holowesko won the Bahamas Cycling Federation's junior National Time Trial in the open all-ages category at the age of 13, in 2014, riding on a Cervélo S2. He won the time trials again in 2015, and came in second in the road race. In the Junior Tour of Ireland in 2016, riding for the US based Hot Tubes, Holowesko held the white jersey for two consecutive days.

He is a two-time USA Junior National Time Trial Champion. He also won the Bahamian National Road Race Championships in 2018, and the Bahamas Pro National Championship Time Trials in 2014, 2015 and 2017.

Holowesko signed to ride with Hagens Berman Axeon for the 2019 season at the age of 18, which made him the youngest member of the team. Prior to signing with Hagens Berman Axeon, he rode for Hot Tubes Development Cycling Team.

== Major results ==
2014
Bahamian National Road Championships

1st Time trial
2nd Road race

1st Time trial (Junior 13–14), United States National Amateur Road Championships
2015
Bahamian National Road Championships

1st Time trial
2nd Road race

2016
1st Time trial (Junior 15–16), United States National Amateur Road Championships
2017
1st Time trial, Bahamian National Road Championships
2018
1st Road race, Bahamian National Road Championships
