= Dominican Republic National Time Trial Championships =

National road cycling championship in the Dominican Republic

The Dominican National Time Trial Championship decides the national time trial champion of the Dominican Republic.

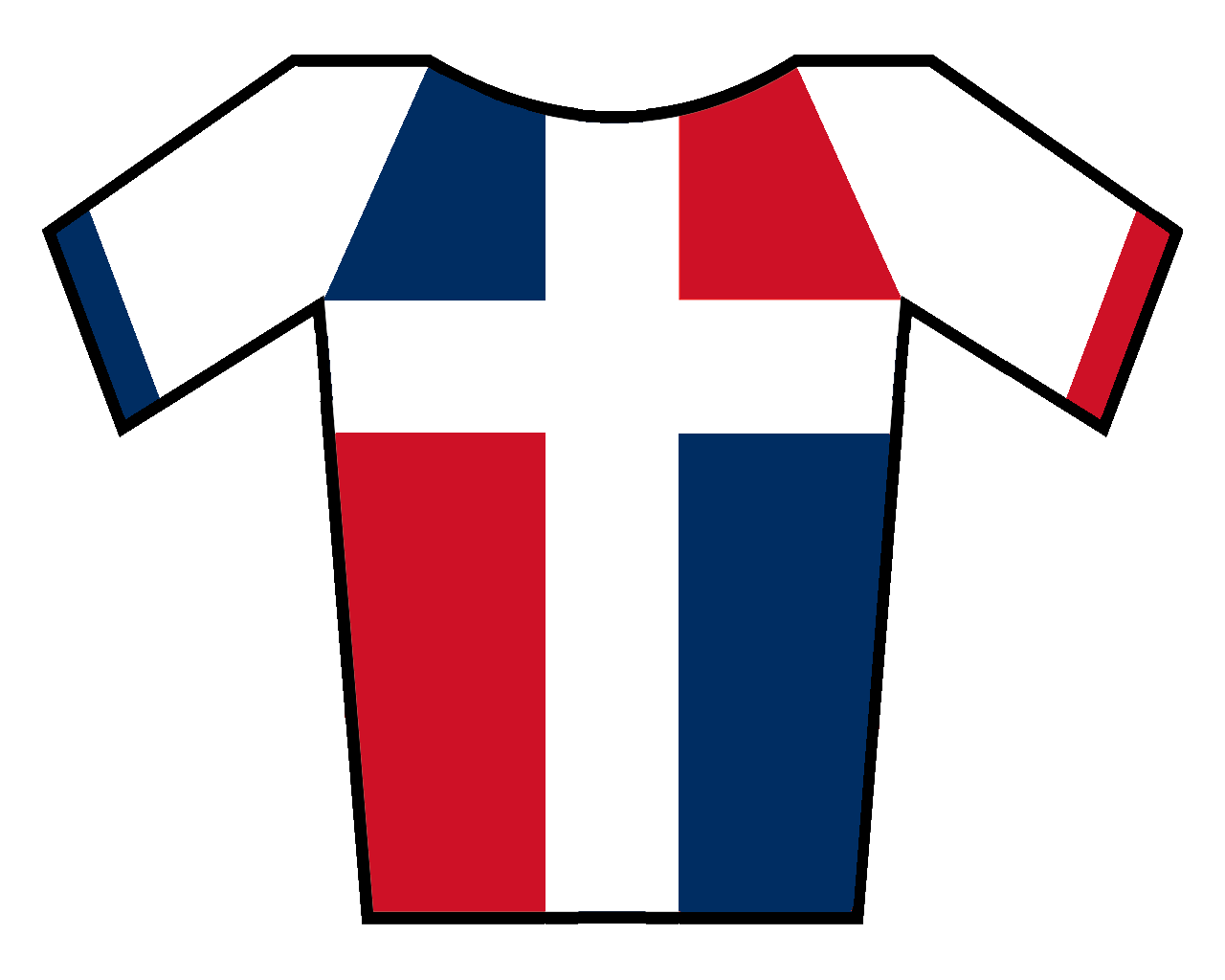

== Men ==
=== Elite ===
Year	Gold	Silver	Bronze	Ref
2007	Augusto Sánchez	Rafael Germán	Jorge Cordero	
2010	Augusto Sánchez	Rafael Germán	Benigno de la Cruz	
2013	Rodny Minier	Julio César Peralta	Heriberto Peña	
2014	Augusto Sánchez	Adderlyn Cruz	Luis Tomás Méndez	
2015	Rafael Merán	William Guzmán	Rodny Minier	
2016	William Guzmán	Ismael Collado	Adderlyn Cruz	
2017	Augusto Sánchez	Rafael Merán	Adderlyn Cruz	
2018	William Guzmán	Geovanny García	Augusto Sánchez	
2019	Rafael Merán	Adderlyn Cruz	Wellington Capellán	
2020– 2021	Not held			
2022	Erlin García	Junior Deribal		
2023	Erlin García	Pablo Alcides Reyes		
2024	Junior Marte	Rudy Germoso	Pablo Alcides Reyes	
2025	Erlin García	Juan Carlos del Rosario	Maikol Brito	

=== U23 ===
Year	Gold	Silver	Bronze	Ref
2007	Erizon Peña	José Ferreras	Brian Zacarías	
2010	Marcos Capellan	Norlandy Taveras	Erizon Peña	
2013	William Guzmán	Adderlyn Cruz	Geovanny García	
2014	William Guzmán	Juan José Cueto	Anthony Rodríguez	
2015	Elvis Reyes	David Astacio	Moisés Selman	
2016	David Astacio	Allen Rodríguez	Dawry Cabrera	
2017	Wellington Canela	Gelyn Saladín	Erick Martínez	
2020– 2021	Not held			
2022	Steven Polanco	Jesús Marte	Frankel Rodríguez	
2025	Frailyn Bierd	Andersen Aracena	Eury Leonardo	

== Women ==
=== Elite ===
Year	Gold	Silver	Bronze	Ref
2007	Juana Fernández	Ana Gómez	Stephany Contreras	
2010	Hilda Castillo	Yaina Beras	Cesarina Ballenilla	
2013	Juana Fernández	Gina Figuereo	Ana González	
2014	Juana Fernández	Natasha Méndez	Mary Fabián	
2015	Juana Fernández	Natasha Méndez	Cesarina Ballenilla	
2016	Natasha Méndez	Juana Fernández	Mónica Rodríguez	
2017	Juana Fernández	Karla de Jesús	Stephany Contreras	
2018	Juana Fernández	Stephany Contreras	Karla de Jesús	
2019	Juana Fernández	Kerla de Jesús	Natasha Méndez	
2020– 2021	Not held			
2022	Juana Fernández	María Vega	—	
2023	Mónica Rodríguez	Juana Fernández	Ana Guzmán	
2024	Flor Espiritusanto	Ana Guzmán	Yanilka Vega	
2025	Flor Espiritusanto	María Vega	Ana Guzmán	

=== U23 ===
Year	Gold	Silver	Bronze	Ref
2022	Flor Espiritusanto	Karen Concepción		
2023	Flor Espiritusanto	Rasselle Ogando	Awdrey Martes	
2024	Melsey Pérez	Awdrey Martes	Amelia Uribe	
2025	Melsey Pérez	Amelia Uribe	Feline Mendoza	

== See also ==
- Dominican Republic National Road Race Championships
