= Juana Fernández =

Dominican Republic cyclist

Personal information
- Full name: Juana Isidra Fernández Veras
- Born: May 15, 1971 (age 55) Dominican Republic

Cycling career
- Sport: Cycling
- Disciplines: Road; Track
- Role: Rider

Major wins
- One-day races National Time Trial Championships (2007, 2013–2015, 2017–2019, 2022) National Road Race Championships (2014, 2019)

Juana Isidra Fernández Veras (born May 15, 1971) is a road and track cyclist from the Dominican Republic. She is an eight-time winner of the Dominican Republic National Time Trial Championships, and a two-time winner of the Dominican Republic National Road Race Championships.

== Major results ==
2003
10th Road race, Pan American Games
2004
5th Road race, Pan American Championships
2007
1st Time trial, National Road Championships
2008
10th Copa Federación Venezolana de Ciclismo
2013
1st Time trial, National Road Championships
4th Road race, Caribbean Road Championships
2014
1st Road race, Caribbean Road Championships
National Road Championships

1st Time trial
1st Road race

2015
1st Time trial, National Road Championships
2016
Puerto Rico Track Cup Conacip

1st Omnium
1st Scratch
2nd Keirin
2nd Sprint

2nd Road race, Caribbean Road Championships
National Road Championships

2nd Time trial
2nd Road race

2017
National Road Championships

1st Time trial
2nd Road race

9th Time trial, Caribbean Road Championships
2018
National Road Championships

1st Time trial
2nd Road race

Caribbean Road Championships

4th Road race
6th Time trial

2019
National Road Championships

1st Time trial
1st Road race

2021
Caribbean Road Championships

2nd Time trial
3rd Road race

2022
1st Time trial, National Road Championships
8th Time trial, Caribbean Road Championships
2023
National Road Championships

2nd Time trial
2nd Road race
