= Yaya Diallo =

Malian musician & author (born 1946)

- Born: 1946 (age 79–80)
- Origin: Republic of Mali
- Occupations: Musician and author

Yaya Diallo is a musician and author from the Republic of Mali.

== Background ==
Yaya Diallo was born in 1946 in the village of Fienso (French Sudan), now Mali, to a nomadic Fula father and a Minianka mother. Yaya was raised in a culture that works, worships, lives and breathes to the beat of the drum. His mother's ties to the Berthe family, including hunters, county chiefs, and musicians, afforded young Yaya the opportunity to hear some of the best musicians of the former canton Zangasso. The musician, healer and sorcerer Nangape Kone was his protector and mentor.

Arriving in Montreal, Canada, in 1967, Yaya graduated from the University of Montreal in Chemistry in 1973. Following a brief career as a chemist, Yaya returned to traditional African music. He was a co-founder of the music and dance groups Djembe-Kan and Cleba, a member of the African Troubadours with the World Music Institute, as well as a faculty member with the Creative Music Studio, Woodstock, NY, and the Omega Institute.

Yaya has taught Applied World Percussion at Bellarmine University in Louisville, KY and offers workshops in traditional African healing, music and dance. He was a seasonal lecturer at Carleton University, teaching Aural Training I & II from 1987 to 1992 and also worked for Multiculturalism at Schools and the Community (MASC) in Ontario and Quebec, Canada, teaching more than 6000 students per year. From 1974 to 1986, he was a staff member of the Intercultural Institute of Montreal, Canada, organizing workshops and lectures about the diverse cultures living in Montreal, covering topics ranging from Alternative Medicine to Aging to Music.

He has performed throughout the US, Canada, Asia (Japan, Singapore), and Europe (France, England, and Belgium).

== Biography ==
Early years

In his book, The Healing Drum, Yaya Diallo wrote about his mother and her famous family of Zangasso, but not about his nomadic heritage. His great-grandfather's name was Yoro Diallo and when Yaya went to Fienso he changed his family name to Sountoura, which is interchangeable with Diallo. In some parts of West Africa, Fula people (Fulani; French: Peul; Fula: Fulɓe) are not welcomed, especially the Diallo family. To be accepted in Fienso, Yaya Diallo's ancestors were sponsored by a Minianka family called Zango-o with the last name Kone, establishing a special relationship between the two families.

Yaya Diallo's family was semi-nomadic. Some stayed in Fienso and others were nomadic in the hostile Miniankala. Minianka farmers hated Fula people because their animals destroyed crops and young plants. To travel, Fula people were initiated into the secret societies. Yaya Diallo's grandfather, Flantio, was powerful and feared by everyone; it was reputed that when he touched you with his magic stick, you got diarrhea. Flantio resumed using the name Diallo. He married Yaya's grandmother, gNire Kone, a midwife from the Kone family of the village Ziena.

A marabout (seer) Fula made a prophecy to Flantio saying that one of his grandsons would be well known in the world using paper and sound. This was similar to the prophecy they made to his mother. At that time, most of Minianka had never seen a piece of paper.

His father

Yaya Diallo's father, Sibo Diallo, was a Nia Messenger and medium from his birthday until 1974 when he became Muslim. During Nia Society rituals, he went into a trance while his brother played Nia Ngoni, an African bass guitar. In a trance, Yaya's father would predict the future of the village, including diseases, bad weather, disasters, death, and the gender of babies in their mother's womb, with surprising accuracy. He knew a lot of medicinal herbs and for each disease, he recommended the herbs to use. He mentored Nia Borotali, the messengers of Nia, and could read and translate the 266 characters of Nia. He died on April 19, 1995. Yaya Diallo's mother died on February 2, 1997.

Nomadic life (1950–1953)

The male children in Diallo's family had to live a nomadic life from age four to 21 years. Female children lived nomadically from age six until marriage at 16 or after.

To survive in nature, Yaya Diallo learned useful things: to be strong, to listen for the sound of hungry lions and hyenas, to observe snakes and scorpions, and to smell deadly smells. He learned the paradox of nature: a plant near a poisonous plant often has an antidote for the poison. Many human diseases have their medications in nature. Yaya Diallo's knowledge included medications found in nature that can cure or stop the symptoms of some illnesses, including diarrhea, flu, headaches, and the bites or stings of scorpions, snakes, bees, and wasps. His family bred cattle and sheep and were always moving, looking for good grass and water for the animals and places where insects would not transmit infectious diseases. They built temporary huts near villages. The women went to the villages to sell or trade dairy products and to buy rice, fish, and flour.

Predators such as hyenas and lions attacked the animals and the shepherds would hunt them away. When an animal was killed, other animals would become stressed, and sometimes the shepherds called musicians to play so the predators went away.

In nature, Diallo had time to observe and learn about animals, including predators, birds, reptiles, herbivores, and insects, and plants. As a result, Diallo was knowledgeable about biology and medical herbs.

Values

In 1953, Diallo went to French school at Zangasso, his mother's native village. During school, Diallo was sedentary. As soon as school stopped he re-joined the nomadic people. When he came to North America, that was the end of his former nomadic life, but as a musician he loves traveling. He said, "The school of traveling is unique. You can not learn in books what you learn when you travel."

Western education

Diallo attended French school from 1953 to 1959, despite French school being considered a curse for villagers. The villagers predicted that Yaya Diallo would not stay in school for two years, saying, "he is not even good enough to be black, how can he succeed in the white man's school?" In 1959, his teacher Arouna Dembele believed Yaya Diallo could succeed in the contest required to go to lycées and colleges, but he failed the contest. From 1959 to 1960, he came back to school and succeeded in the contest and went to the Collège Moderne of Sikasso. He received the D.E.F., Diploma of Fundamental Studies, in 1964. To help his mother, he wanted to study to become a teacher, but his mother refused his request. Instead, he was oriented to biological studies, including mathematics, physics, chemistry, and biology. In 1966, he succeeded in both writing and oral exams and obtained the first part of Baccalauréat Français (Malien). In 1967, the last year of secondary school, he was one of the best students in biology, which meant he could have a scholarship from the World Health Organization to go to medical school in France. Instead, in April 1967, Yaya Diallo accepted a scholarship from Canada to become a sanitary engineer.

He came to Montreal on September 22, 1967, two weeks before the mid-term exams. In 1968–69, he passed all exams except technical drawing. The Canadian government recommended that he go to an intensive drawing class, but he refused the request and lost his scholarship. His girlfriend's father, manager of Stuart Biscuit, gave him a job in the factory, and he later began to study organic chemistry in order to understand the chemical products in herbs and plants. From 1969 to 1970 he was working nights and attending school in the daytime. In October 1970, he stopped his education due to Montreal's October Revolution. Recommencing in 1973, Diallo got his bachelor's diploma in organic chemistry.

Brief career as a chemist — University of Montreal (May–September 1973)

After graduation he was hired by Dr. Robert Marchesseault, head of the Department of Chemistry, to determine how to make waterproof paper from rolls of paper in movement. Diallo had to determine the time required for each stage of treating the paper, and the quantities of the various materials. Yaya said, "I like this project. I studied chemistry to get my hands wet. I like the technical aspect of sciences. I want to make products."

He interrupted his career to apply for the Canadian government waiver for illegal aliens.

Interruption

In August 1973, Diallo learned of a program for illegal aliens and especially for students. He registered as a student at H.E.C. (Hautes Études Commerciales), a business school, and filed the requested papers to stay in Canada. For eight months, the immigration officers gave him a hard time. In March 1974, he received an order to leave Canada or he would be deported in two days. However, he met the right people at the right time and was given permission to stay in Canada. He became an immigrant in 1974 and a Canadian citizen in 1983.

Second short career as a chemist

In 1975, Diallo was ready to go back home to Mali. In the newspaper he saw a contest in which the winner would get a job at the Department of Geology at the Université du Québec in Montreal. He won the contest and was hired to work with a double collector mass spectrograph, which could be a useful project for people living in desert countries. According to the literature, this new technique could be used to estimate the age of water trapped underground. Every six months, a sample was taken and analyzed. If the age was the same, that meant that there was no new source of water to that specific location. People who use wells in the desert could be warned that one day they would lack water. When the differences changed, that meant that there was new water, so people could use the water without worries.

Musical career

Yaya Diallo said, "For my people, with its rich musical context, exposure to music begins in the wombs when pregnant mothers join in the community dance...when infants are then wrapped onto their mother's backs with a cloth and taken into the dancing circle with everyone else." This statement is quoted by Mickey Hart in his book Planet Drum, p. 88. Yaya Diallo's first music and dance lessons included exploring the balafons which were kept in his paternal family. In his native village, Fienso, he learned Peenyi (Dounou), spiritual balafon, morals, proverbs, and philosophy with his mentor Nangape Kone. Sounkalo Kone and Issa Koroma gave him djembe (daykaylaykay) lessons. Yago Kone was his biology and Moukolo teacher. In Zangasso his grandfather taught him hand and stick drum techniques, and after his death, his grandfather continued to teach him music and wisdom in his dreams. Sotigui Kone was his religious tama (talking) drum teacher. When he was six years old, Yaya Diallo had his first drum sculpted by the blacksmith Nianso Koroma. He formed his first music group with the goals and dreams to impress his grandfather.

In order to live with Minianka people, Yaya Diallo had several initiations. He learned the music and the instruments which go with each step of the rituals, always interested in the religious and mystical aspects of the music. In the different secret societies, he played the instrument that sustained the rhythm and/or tempo.

As a shepherd, Yaya Diallo used his body, pieces of wood and stones as musical instruments. During the day he listened to musicians from different villages playing as motivation for groups of collective farmers to work quickly. He listened to birds, insects, and by night, orchestras of frogs.

In Sikasso, the capital of balafons, he listened to the finest players in 1960–61. In Bamako, djembe is the main instrument, and for his six years at the lycée, he heard great djembe players.

Musical career in Montreal, Canada (1976–1978)

Yaya Diallo quit his job and met Alama Kanate from Côte d'Ivoire, and with two Senegalese musicians, Boubacar Gueye and Moustapha Seck, they founded a band called Djeme-kan. The group performed for weddings and cultural events without good results. The Senegalese musicians abandoned the group and were replaced by a Congolese guitarist and singer, and Alain Tagny, a dancer from Cameroun. After two successful nights at the National Bibliothèque de Montreal, Alama Kanate claimed that the group belonged to him, which resulted in Djeme-kan dividing in two parts.

Yaya Diallo and Alain Tagny created Cleba, which means "the sun is shining for everyone", and white people were accepted in the group. Cleba was successful and played the main stage for big events such as the St. John Baptist Celebration. In May 1978, the group did a tour in Saguenay-Lac-Saint-Jean outside of Montreal which was a fiasco. The most important thing was that in the 1970s, French Canadians were not ready to see white men playing African instruments and white women dancing to African music. When Cleba came back to Montreal, they lost the motivation to continue and quit the group.

Hard time in his life

From October 1977 to February 1978, Diallo survived on unemployment funds and then sold Grolier Encyclopedias door to door. Through 1979, he was dating Helen Alemany, his son Teli Diallo's mother, and teaching drum classes at the space they had rented for Cleba. He was also jamming at La Grande Passe on Ontario Street and Chez Dumas on Emery Street. At the Centre Monchanin, later the Intercultural Institute of Montreal, he started to teach African dance to a group of women. In 1980, at the end of the project, Diallo was hired to work at the center. He continued to work part-time and from 1980 to 1987, was a staff member and treasurer of the board.

In 1980, Yaya Diallo recorded his first LP record, produced by Stephen Conroy through his company Onzou Records. The LP release was done at multiple venues in March and April 1981 and the phenomenon of Yaya Diallo was born in Montreal. Karl Parent, a journalist of CBC International, was amazed by what he heard at L'Improvu and offered Yaya Diallo the opportunity to make music for the documentary film Leopold Cedar Senghor, Former President of Senegal. The film was presented at CBC TV on Tuesday, May 1981. (See TV program, Ici Radio-Canada, Vol. 5, no. 22.)

Also in 1980, Diallo met Madame Dominique de Menil from Houston, Texas, who tasked him with a difficult mission. On June 20, 1981, he would play the appropriate rhythm or beats as a reward for ten people or organizations at The Rothko Chapel Rewards in Recognition of Commitment to Truth and Freedom. For example, for Las Madres de La Playa de Mayo, Buenos Aires, Argentina, he played the rhythm for people who had lost men, women, children. For Warren Robbins, son of Jewish immigrants from Ukraine and founder and director of the Museum of African Arts in Washington, D.C., who had accomplished a mission impossible, Yaya Diallo played a special music for brave people. When the journalist Zwelakhe Sisulu's name was announced, Diallo played a beat for courage and motivation.

Warren Robbins had been impressed by Yaya Diallo and, in December 1981, invited him for some events in Washington, D.C. Diallo met leaders of the Black community, especially the group of African Heritage. He and Pascal Milogo performed an evening of balafon music at the Smithsonian Museum in Washington, D.C., on December 27, 1981, sponsored by the National Museum of African Art program. To meet Africans living in Washington, D.C., he did a balafon concert at "The Baobab", a popular Malian restaurant.

He was also invited to speak on La Voix de l'Amérique, a radio show hosted by George Collinet, although he did not speak with George Collinet, who was on vacation. Diallo's message was broadcast to 250 countries: "Young people, build your own country, there is no room for everybody in the USA. American youth should not be your role models."

Creative Music Studio, Woodstock, NY, CMS

During 1981, Diallo conducted drum workshops and performed with his group from Montreal. He performed at CMS Summer Festival '81: World music on Sunday July 12, 1981 as "Yaya Diallo from Mali". People such as John Abercrombie, Karl Berger, Chick Corea, Dave Holland, Jack DeJohnette, Pat Metheny, Charlie Haden, and Dewey Redman had performed at CMS. Diallo remained a faculty member from 1981 to its end.

Introduction to jazz music

Baikida Carrol, a jazz horn player from St. Louis, invited Yaya Diallo to play with one of his groups at Public Theater NY on Friday November 14, 198?. The first team called "Bush Wish" included Nana Vasconcellos, Bresil, Yaya Diallo and others. The second team was composed of Julius Hemphill and Anthony Davis. Randy Weston appeared both nights. Even though Yaya Diallo said that he knew nothing about jazz, he felt at home in jam sessions with Baikida Carrol, Julius Hempell, Anthony Davis, and others.

Cultural exchange and writings

In June 1983, Yaya Diallo participated in a symposium in Namur, Belgium. That symposium was organized for European scholars and experts in intercultural cooperation by University De La Paix and addressed these questions: What are unifying myths of the world? Who has the right to define the criteria of good life for the world?

In July 1983, he returned to Namur, Belgium, to assist in an intercultural colloquium organized by 200 non-profit organizations from all over the world. After a week of work using six languages, Yaya Diallo was tasked with writing a French-language report of the symposium, along with his friend Adama Samassekou who was living in Paris, France. Yaya Diallo returned to Montreal with 10 cassette tapes and completed the work by himself.

In Namur, Yaya Diallo had shared a room with Professor Alpha Oumar Konare, who later became a two-term President of Mali (1992–2002) and was chairperson of the African Union. In addition, his friend Adama Samassekou was Minister of Education in Mali.

In September, Yaya Diallo wrote a controversial and critical article about international cooperation in French, entitled La Cooperation est-elle possible? This article is published in Interculture (October–December 1983, Vol. XVI, No. 4 cahier 81, pp. 9–17).

With a grant from the Ministry of Multiculturalism of Canada, Diallo wrote the Profil Culturel Africain. This document was first published in 1985 by the Intercultural Institute of Montreal. Teachers, researchers, students, and seekers of exoticism, as well as Africans searching for their roots, have referred to it. In spite of that relative success, it is out of print. In October 2001, it was translated in English as At the Threshold of the African Soul in The Fulani-Minianka Way, Intercultural Issue No. 141. This document is the heart of the book, Healing Drum, African Wisdom Teachings. Diallo's international reputation came from his writings, including Healing Drum, as writing books is his destiny. Diallo said, "I don't want to be associated with a record company."

Music and multicultural education

In 1982, as a musician, Diallo played two weeks at CNE (Canadian National Exhibition) in Toronto. In 1986, he played at the International Exhibition in Vancouver, British Columbia, at Folklife, and at the Canada Pavilion. In 1987, he stopped working at the Institute and started to tour to schools with the program made by former Governor General of Canada Jeanne Sauvé. The same year, he started teaching two courses, Aural Training I and II, at Carleton University. Diallo also was one of the first artists of the program made by Jan Andrews and Jennifer Cayley, "A Chance to Give." The organization became MASC, Multiculturalism at Schools and Communities. Diallo worked for MASC from 1988 to 2004.

Diallo did some performances with his band, Kanze, at Festival Culture Canada 88 in Ottawa-Hull, more than five festivals Nuits d'Afrique with Ballattou, Festival 1001 Nuits, Club Soda in 1989 and 1990, and The Spectrum de Montreal.

In 1987, Diallo collaborated with others of so-called French-speaking countries to make the song "Franc Parler" for the Summit of Francophony at Quebec City.

The Healing Drum was published in 1989. The president of Inner Traditions, his wife and his staff came to Montreal to meet the community. He bought food for the people of Balattou, for two nights the kanza played. We had a press conference with The Gazette, La Presse, and Voir. After Montreal the company had planned tours for Yaya Diallo. He went to bookstores and Universities, he signed books and did lectures all over the United States. Mickey Hart, the drummer of the Grateful Dead, wrote two books, in which he quoted Diallo's work and gave his opinion about how good he thought The Healing Drum was. The phenomenon of The Healing Drum was born. For several years Diallo did workshops, lectures and debates. The World Music Institute contacted him, he became a member of the artists they manage. They booked him everywhere they could as a solo artist. In 1993 they created the African Troubadours, and they too booked shows everywhere. Other people like Everyone's Drumming with Dounoukan, Relaxation Company, Dombaa Folee had produced Diallo's music, and organized the promotion of the products.

== Selected performances, workshops, and press coverage ==
Diallo appeared at the Harrison Festival of the Arts in British Columbia in 1988. In 1992, he performed at the University of Kentucky as part of a diversity celebration. He also appeared at the Yukon Storytelling Festival in 1994.

In the mid-1990s, Diallo toured and performed with the World Music Institute's African Troubadours project.

Diallo participated in percussion and music workshops in New York, Connecticut, and elsewhere, including events at Symphony Space, the New York Open Center, Sacred Heart University, and Woodstock, New York.

In 1995, Diallo met Muhammad Ali at Dunbar Community Center in Lexington, Kentucky. In 1996, he participated in One Thunder in Singapore, a drumming event connected to the World Trade Organization meetings.

Press coverage in the 1990s and early 2000s described Diallo's drumming, teaching, and book-related work.

Diallo appeared in workshops, festivals, and educational programs in 1999, including events in Egypt, Louisville, London, Quebec, Massachusetts, and the Bahamas. His participation in the Sivananda Millennium World Peace Pilgrimage was also noted in Sivananda Yogalife.

Diallo worked as an artist-in-residence and workshop leader in schools and conferences in Kentucky and elsewhere during the 2000s.

In 2004, Diallo received a Village Awards community service and arts award in Louisville, Kentucky. In 2011, Centre College included him in its African Voices Festival.

== Books ==
- 1985 At the Threshold of the African Soul: The Fulani-Minianka Way / A Village Voice
- A Journal published by the Intercultural Center of Montreal
- 1989 The Healing Drum: African Wisdom Teachings (Destiny Books)
- 2001 Reprint journal At the Threshold of the African Soul

== Articles and reviews ==
- Introduction to Djembe Drum Music Articles
- Bellarmine Article About Yaya Diallo
- From Africa to the World, Yaya Diallo Unleashes His Music
- The History of African Music
- The Meaning of Music
- Effects of Sound
- The Destruction of African Culture
- Djembe Drum Music
- The Spiritual Significance of Music
- Nangape Reviews
- Dounoukan Reviews
- Live at Club Soda Reviews
- The Healing Drum Book Reviews
- The Healing Drum CD Reviews
- The Truth About The Healing Drum
- La cooperation est-elle possible?
- Killing The Ego (Yoga Life)

== Awards ==
- 1986—Awarded by the Commissioner General of Section for Canada, recognizing his services rendered to the Canada Pavilion during the 1986 World Exposition Vancouver, British Columbia.
- 2005—Entertainer of the Year, awarded by the African People's Intercontinental Awards.
- 2008—Mosaic Award, Louisville, KY.

== Discography ==
- The Healing Drum: African Ceremonial and Ritual Music (1994) CD - Destiny Recordings ISBN 0-89281-505-1, ISBN 978-0-89281-505-0
- Dounoukan (1995) CD - Yaya Diallo
- Dombaa Fole: Medicine Music of Mali (1998) CD & audio Cassette - Relaxation Company ISBN 1-55961-501-X, ISBN 978-1-55961-501-3
- Nangape (2003) CD - Onzou Records
- Live at Club Soda (2003) CD - Onzou Records
