= Robert Marsh (cyclist) =

Antiguan cyclist

Personal information
- Full name: Robert Frances Marsh
- Born: 20 December 1968 (age 57)

Cycling career
- Sport: Cycling
- Discipline: Road
- Role: Rider

Robert Frances Marsh (born 20 December 1968) is an Antiguan cyclist. He competed in the individual road race at the 1992 Summer Olympics. He is a two-time National Road Race Champion and a five-time National Time Trial Champion.

== Major results ==
2006
2nd Road race, National Road Championships
2007
1st Road race, National Road Championships
2009
1st Time trial, National Road Championships
2010
National Road Championships

1st Time trial
2nd Road race

2011
National Road Championships

2nd Time trial
2nd Road race

2012
1st National Time Trial Championships
2013
National Road Championships

2nd Time trial
2nd Road race

2014
National Road Championships

2nd Time trial
3rd Road race

2015
National Road Championships

1st Time trial
3rd Road race

2017
National Road Championships

1st Road race
2nd Time trial

2018
National Road Championships

1st Time trial
2nd Road race

2021
1st Time trial, National Road Championships
2022
2nd Time trial, National Road Championships
2023
1st Time trial, National Road Championships
2024
National Road Championships

1st Time trial
3rd Road race
