= Vuelta a la Independencia Nacional =

Dominican multi-day road cycling race

Vuelta Ciclistica Independencia Nacional
Race details
- Date: February–March
- Region: Dominican Republic
- Discipline: Road
- Competition: UCI America Tour
- Type: Stage race

History
- First edition: 1979
- Editions: 46 (as of 2025)
- First winner: Bernardo Colex (MEX)
- Most wins: Ismael Sánchez (DOM) (5 wins)
- Most recent: Óscar Sevilla (ESP)

Vuelta Ciclistica Independencia Nacional is a stage road bicycle race held annually in the Dominican Republic by the national federation, and it is the most important race in the country. The race has organized as a 2.2 event on the UCI America Tour on and off since 2008.

In 2013, 2017 and since 2020 the race has held as a national event, since it was excluded from the UCI America Tour.

== Winners ==
Year	Country	Rider	Team
1979	Mexico	Bernardo Colex	
1980	Venezuela	Justo Galaviz	
1981	United States	Dale Stetina	
1982	Colombia	José Antonio Agudelo Gómez	
1983	Mexico	Salvador Rios	
1984	Colombia	José Antonio Agudelo Gómez	
1985	Colombia	Gustavo Pardo	
1986	Colombia	Ángel Alayon	
1987	Dominican Republic	Marino Garcia	
1988	Dominican Republic	Marino Garcia	
1989	Venezuela	José Lindarte	
1990	Venezuela	Fernando Correa	
1991	Colombia	José Vicente Ávila	
1992	Colombia	Omar Trompa	
1993	Venezuela	Oscar Mendoza	
1994	No race		
1995	Cuba	Eliecer Valdés	
1996	Germany	Frank Agustin	
1997	Germany	Parlsche Eurico	
1998	Venezuela	Robinson Merchán	
1999	Venezuela	Tommy Alcedo	
2000	Venezuela	Alexis Méndez	
2001	Venezuela	Manuel Guevara	Lotería del Táchira
2002	Kazakhstan	Maxim Iglinsky	Kazakhstan (national team)
2003	Colombia	Gregorio Ladino	Fénix-Baninter
2004	Kazakhstan	Maxim Iglinsky	Kazakhstan (national team)
2005	Kazakhstan	Andrey Mizourov	Cycling Team Capec
2006	Venezuela	Richard Ochoa	Venezuela (national team)
2007	Colombia	Jairo Pérez	Mauricio Báez
2008	Venezuela	Carlos José Ochoa	Venezuela (national team)
2009	Chile	Luis Fernando Sepúlveda	Aro & Pedal-Inteja
2010	Dominican Republic	Augusto Sánchez	Aro & Pedal
2011	Venezuela	Tomás Gil	Venezuela (national team)
2012	Dominican Republic	Ismael Sánchez	La Vega-Com.Nal.Ener
2013	Colombia	Edwin Sánchez	Guadeloupe (national team)
2014	Colombia	Edwin Sánchez	Formesan-Bogotá Humana
2015	Colombia	Robigzon Oyola	EPM–UNE–Área Metropolitana
2016	Dominican Republic	Ismael Sánchez	Aero Cycling Team
2017	Dominican Republic	Ismael Sánchez	Aero Cycling Team
2018	Dominican Republic	Augusto Sánchez	Aero Cycling Team
2019	Colombia	Robinson Chalapud	Medellín
2020	Dominican Republic	Ismael Sánchez	Aero Cycling Team
2021	Venezuela	Yurgen Ramírez	Venezuela Pais Futuro
2022	Dominican Republic	Ismael Sánchez	Corratec Racing America
2023	Venezuela	Luis Mora	Doglocy-Inteja
2024	Venezuela	José Castillo	Venezuela Pais Futuro
2025	Spain	Óscar Sevilla	Team Medellín–EPM
