= Augusto Sánchez =

Dominican Republic cyclist

Personal information
- Full name: Augusto Sánchez Beriguete
- Born: 19 December 1983 (age 42) Santa Cruz de Barahona, Dominican Republic

Cycling career
- Sport: Cycling
- Current team: Aero Cycling Team
- Disciplines: Road, track
- Role: Rider

Amateur teams
- 2009–2012: Aro & Pedal
- 2013: Inteja
- 2015–: Aero Cycling Team

Professional teams
- 2008: Caico
- 2014: Differdange–Losch

Augusto Sánchez Beriguete (born 19 December 1983 in Santa Cruz de Barahona) is a Dominican cyclist.

== Major results ==
2004
1st Stage 8 Tour de la Martinique
2006
1st Stage 10 Vuelta a Cuba
2007
1st National Time Trial Championships
1st Stage 8 Tour de Guadeloupe
2008
2nd Overall Vuelta a la Independencia Nacional
2010
1st National Time Trial Championships
1st Overall Vuelta a la Independencia Nacional

1st Stage 2

2011
1st Stage 1 Vuelta a la Independencia Nacional
2013
1st Stage 2 Vuelta a la Independencia Nacional
2014
1st National Time Trial Championships
2016
1st Stage 1 (TTT) Vuelta a la Independencia Nacional
2017
1st National Time Trial Championships
1st Stage 1 (TTT) Vuelta a la Independencia Nacional
2018
1st Overall Vuelta a la Independencia Nacional

1st Stage 2
