= Manhattan Beach Grand Prix =

American single-day road cycling race

Race details
- Date: July
- Region: Manhattan Beach, California
- Discipline: Road
- Competition: National calendar
- Type: One-day race
- Organiser: South Bay Wheelmen
- Race director: Greg Aden

History
- First edition: 1962
- Editions: 62 (as of 2025)
- First winner: Bob Tetzlaff (USA)
- Most wins: Scott McKinley (USA); Rahsaan Bahati (USA); Cory Williams (USA); Justin Williams (BLZ); (3 wins)
- Most recent: Justin Williams (BLZ)

History (women)
- First winner: Nicole Freedman (USA)
- Most recent: Colleen Gulick (USA)

The Manhattan Beach Grand Prix is a single-day road cycling race held in Manhattan Beach, California. The race takes place annually in July and was first contested in 1962. The race was founded by Ted Ernst and takes place as a criterium on a 1.3-mile course, which it has used for very edition since its inception.

== Winners ==
=== Men ===
Year	Winner	Second	Third
1962	(United States) Bob Tetzlaff		
1963	(United States) Nick Van Male		
1964	(United States) Skip Cutting		
1965	(United States) Jack Disney		
1966	(United States) Mike Penkert		
1967	(United States) Buddy Campbell		
1968	(United States) Tom Garrity		
1969	(United States) Peter Kendal		
1970	(United States) David Mulica		
1971	(Trinidad and Tobago) Vernon Stauble		
1972	(United States) John Timbers		
1973	(Jamaica) Xavier Mirander		
1974	(United States) Ron Skarin		
1975	(United States) Ralph Therrio		
1976	(United States) Bill Keane		
1977	(United States) Kevin Lutz		
1978	(United States) Ron Skarin		
1979	(United States) Scott Hembree		
1980	(Sweden) Jim Berg		
1981	(Canada) Ron Hayman		
1982	(United States) Chris Huber		
1983	(Switzerland) Hans Ledermann		
1984	(France) Thierry Marie		
1985	(Mexico) Manuel Youshimatz		
1986	(United States) Wayne Stetina		
1987	(United States) Scott McKinley		
1988	(United States) Dominic Felde		
1989	(United States) Bruce Reid		
1990	(United States) Steve Speaks		
1991	(United States) Mike Raczuk		
1992	(United States) Scott McKinley		
1993	(United Kingdom) David Mann		
1994	(United States) Scott McKinley		
1995	(United Kingdom) Malcolm Elliott		
1996	(United Kingdom) Malcolm Elliott		
1997	(United States) Jamie Paolinetti		
1998	(United States) John Peters	(United States) Steve Hegg	(New Zealand) Julian Dean
1999	(Mexico) Miguel Ángel Meza	(United States) John Peters	(United States) Jonas Carney
2000	(United States) David McCook	(United States) John Peters	(United States) Rahsaan Bahati
2001	(United States) Jonas Carney	(New Zealand) Graeme Miller	(United States) Rahsaan Bahati
2002	(Canada) Gordon Fraser	(Australia) Brent Dawson	(United States) Alex Candelario
2003	(United States) Jonas Carney	(United States) Rahsaan Bahati	(Canada) Gordon Fraser
2004	(United States) Tyler Farrar	(United States) Jonas Carney	(United States) Robbie Ventura
2005	(New Zealand) Greg Henderson	(United States) Tyler Farrar	(Cuba) Iván Domínguez
2006	(Argentina) Juan José Haedo	(New Zealand) Greg Henderson	(United States) Kyle Gritters
2007	(United States) Rahsaan Bahati	(Cuba) Iván Domínguez	(United States) Kayle Leogrande
2008	(United States) Rahsaan Bahati	(Argentina) Ricardo Escuela	(United States) Brad Huff
2009	(United States) Rahsaan Bahati	(Argentina) Lucas Sebastián Haedo	(United States) Ken Hanson
2010	(Cuba) Yosvany Falcón	(Australia) Bernard Sulzberger	(Mexico) Diego Yépez
2011	(Colombia) Carlos Alzate	(Australia) Jonathan Cantwell	(United States) Jake Keough
2012	(United States) Ken Hanson	(Argentina) Ricardo Escuela	(Australia) Hilton Clarke
2013	(United States) Jesse Anthony	(United States) Blake Anton	(United States) Brandon Gritters
2014	(United States) Ken Hanson	(United States) Luke Keough	(United States) Justin Williams
2015	(Australia) Hilton Clarke	(United States) David Santos	(United States) Garrett Olsen
2016	(United States) Justin Williams	(Mexico) Alfredo Rodríguez	(United States) Eamon Lucas
2017	(United States) Cory Williams	(Mexico) Mario Zamora	(United States) Randall Coxworth
2018	(United States) Justin Williams	(United States) Tyler Locke	(Netherlands) Jasper Verkuijl
2019	(United States) Cory Williams	(United States) Robin Carpenter	(United States) Ryan Jastrab
2020-2021	No race		
2022	(United States) Cory Williams	(Mexico) Eduardo Cruz	(United States) Nigel De Sota
2022	(Belize) Justin Williams	(Mexico) Eduardo Cruz	(United States) Cory Williams

=== Women ===
Year	Winner	Second	Third
1999	(United States) Nicole Freedman	(United States) Pam Schuster	(United States) Suzanne Sonye
2000	(United States) Nicole Reinhart	(United States) Carmen Spore	(United States) Pam Schuster
2001	(United States) Tina Mayolo	(United States) Katrina Berger	(United States) Suzanne Sonye
2002	(United States) Suzanne Sonye	(United States) Becky Quinn	(United States) Jenny Eyerman
2003	(United States) Becky Quinn	(Canada) Gina Grain	(United States) Lara Kroepsch
2004	(United States) Tina Pic	(United States) Nicole Freedman	(United States) Katrina Grove
2005	(Germany) Ina-Yoko Teutenberg	(United States) Nicole Freedman	(United States) Tina Pic
2006	(United States) Nicky Wangsgard	(United States) Shelley Olds	(United States) Taitt Sato
2007	(United States) Laura Van Gilder	(New Zealand) Malindi Maclean	(United States) Shontelle Gauthier
2008	(United States) Brooke Miller	(United States) Laura Van Gilder	(United States) Jennifer McRae
2009	(United States) Coryn Rivera	(New Zealand) Malindi Maclean	(United States) Catherine Fiedler-Cook
2010	(United States) Pam Schuster	(United States) Priscilla Calderon	(United States) Anna Drakulich
2011	(United States) Jennifer Valente	(Spain) Beatriz Rodríguez	(United States) Julia Lafranchise
2012	(United States) Shelby Reynolds	(United States) Julie Cutts	(Australia) Melina Bernecker
2013	(United States) Erica Allar	(United States) Samantha Schneider	(United States) Laura Van Gilder
2014	(United States) Erica Allar	(United States) Tina Pic	(United States) Sarah Fader
2015	(United States) Samantha Schneider	(United States) Erica Allar	(United States) Tina Pic
2016	(United States) Kimberly Lucie	(United States) Joy McCulloch	(United States) Katie Donovan
2017	(Norway) Anita Stenberg	(Canada) Joëlle Numainville	(United States) Laura Van Gilder
2018	(United States) Coryn Rivera	(United States) Katie Mardayat	(United States) Kristabel Doebel-Hickok
2019	(United States) Coryn Rivera	(United States) Emily Georgeson	(United States) Amber Neben
2020-2021	No race		
2022	(United States) Melissa Hailey		
2023	(United States) Colleen Gulick	(United States) Laurel Rathbun	(United States) Mary Joyce Monton
