= USA Cycling Pro Road Tour =

The USA Cycling Pro Road Tour is a professional and amateur road bicycle racing series organized by USA Cycling. It is the top road cycling series in the United States featuring criteriums, road races, stage races and omniums. Most events host races for both men and women and some events host races for men or women only.

== Results ==
Year	Rider Championship Men's	Rider Championship Women's	Team Championship Men's	Team Championship Women's
2018	Gavin Mannion (USA)	Katie Hall (USA)	UnitedHealthcare Pro Cycling	UnitedHealthcare Pro Cycling
2019	James Piccoli (CAN)	Chloé Dygert (USA)	Elevate - Khs Pro Cycling	Sho-Air TWENTY20
2020	James Piccoli (CAN)	Chloé Dygert (USA)	Elevate - Khs Pro Cycling	Sho-Air TWENTY20
2021	Tyler Williams	Skylar Schneider	L39ION of Los Angeles	L39ION of Los Angeles
