= Matt DeCanio =

American cyclist (born 1977)

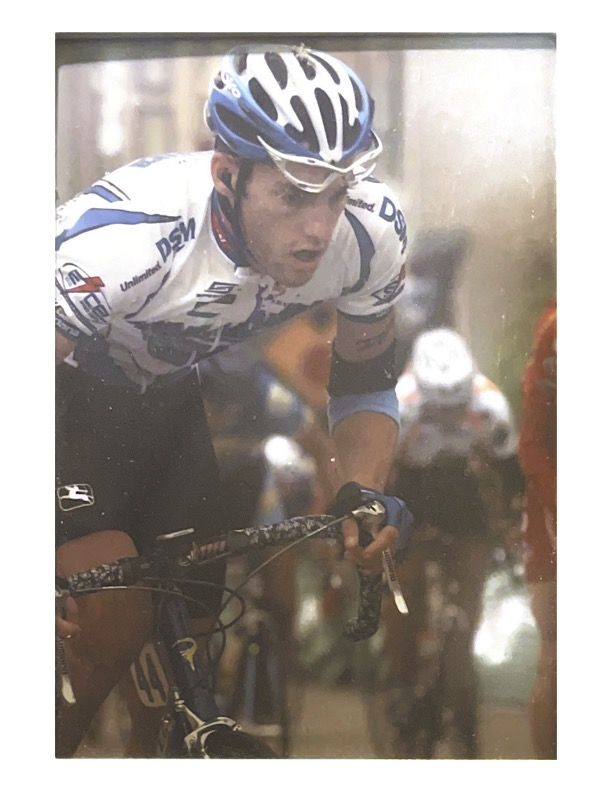

Personal information
- Full name: Matthew DeCanio
- Born: April 5, 1977 (age 49) Charlottesville, Virginia, U.S.
- Height: 5 ft 11 in (1.80 m)
- Weight: 165 lb (75 kg)

Cycling career
- Sport: Cycling
- Discipline: Road
- Role: Rider
- Rider type: All-around

Amateur teams
- 1995-2001: US National Team
- 1995: G.S. Mengoni-Hot Tubes
- 2010: Olympique Cycliste Val d'Oise

Professional teams
- 1997-1998: G.S. Filati Alessandra
- 2000: Linda McCartney Racing Team
- 2001: Saturn Cycling Team
- 2002-2003: Prime Alliance Cycling Team
- 2005: Kodak Sierra Nevada Pro Cycling

Major wins
- Stage races Junior Killington Stage Race 1995 1st in Stage 3 Tour de Toona (USA) 2002 1st in Stage 4 Sea Otter Classic (USA) 2003 One-day races and Classics 17-18 National Time Trial Champion 1995

Matt DeCanio (born April 5, 1977) is an American ex-professional racing cyclist.

DeCanio is an outspoken critic of doping in the sport, and founded the Stolen Underground anti-doping movement after voluntarily confessing to performance-enhancing drug use and serving a two-year ban for doping.

DeCanio was sued in 2008 by convicted doper Kayle Leogrande for defamation, after publishing a recorded telephone call between himself and Suzanne Sonye, although the suit was thrown out by a judge in the Superior Court of California.

In 2010 he was making a comeback to cycling, racing for French amateur team Olympique Cycliste Val d'Oise.

In 2022 DeCanio wrote an autobiography detailing his entire racing career and the fallout of him calling out Lance Armstrong and others for doping, long before Armstrong admitted it. He reveals in his book how he was seen as crazy for bringing to light all the doping in the sport, as well as blacklisted, slandered, and threatened.

== Palmares ==
1995
1st Junior Killington Stage Race
1st 17-18 Junior Time Trial Championships
3rd Stage 4 Tour of the Gila

1996
5th Stage 3 Hessen Rundfahrt

1999
17th ITT, U-23 World Championships

2001
10th Stage 10 (ITT) Tour de Langkawi
3rd Overall Tour of Willamette
3rd Stage 2 Tour of the Gila

2002
2nd Overall Tour de Toona

1st Stage 3

2nd Overall Tour de Beauce

3rd and Stage 4
3rd Stage 7

2003
5th Overall Sea Otter Classic (USA)

10th Stage 2 (ITT)
1st Stage 4

2nd Copa America de Ciclismo, São Paulo (BRA)
3rd Stage 2 Solano Bicycle Classic (USA)
3rd Stage 1 Fitchburg Longsjo Classic, Royal Plaza Fitchburg (USA)
