= Joseph M. Papp =

American road racing cyclist (born 1975)

- Papp in 2006 after the GF Ceriale

Personal information
- Full name: Joseph Michael Papp
- Nickname: "JoePa" / "El Leon de Madruga" / "Mr. 58%" /
- Born: May 25, 1975 (age 51) Parma, Ohio, US
- Height: 5 ft 1 in (1.55 m)
- Weight: 148 lb (67 kg)

Cycling career
- Sport: Cycling
- Current team: Retired
- Discipline: Road
- Role: Rider
- Rider type: Sprinter

Amateur teams
- US National Team
- Partizan-Whistle
- Team Bianchi-Cinghiale
- La Polar
- UPMC-ACT
- Champion Systems

Professional teams
- Montgomery-Bell
- Pittsburgh Power

Joseph Michael "Joe" Papp (born May 25, 1975) is a former professional American road racing cyclist and US National cycling team member, author, and convicted doper and drug distributor. A dual Irish–American citizen, Papp was born in Ohio and raised in Western Pennsylvania, where he attended high school and university. Early in his career, Papp was a member of the Pittsburgh Power, a professional team in the National Cycle League owned by Franco Harris. He also rode as a stagiare with Montgomery-Bell, but finished his career in 2006 riding for the Italian teams Partizan-Whistle and Team Bianchi-Cinghiale, after starting the year with Hong Kong–based Champion System.

Papp was briefly a cycling author, writing about his experiences in the professional peloton, and was a featured diarist for the cycling news website cyclingnews.com. Papp has also written training advice columns, product reviews, and route guides for biking in Pittsburgh. His work has appeared in publications including VeloNews, Winning Bicycle Racing Illustrated, The Ride, Bike Culture and Cycling Times.

Papp earned a BA in History from the University of Pittsburgh, where he was elected to Phi Beta Kappa. He won a Coro Fellowship in Public Affairs and was a graduate student in the Heinz School of Public Policy at Carnegie Mellon University, before he later pursued, and failed to obtain, an MBA at Chatham University. However, Papp's academic work and professional development were interrupted by his extensive involvement in multiple doping scandals in cycling, including those involving Floyd Landis, Kayle Leogrande, Frenchwoman Jeannie Longo, and Lance Armstrong. After cooperating on various cases with the United States Anti-Doping Agency, Papp was sentenced in 2011 on two counts of conspiracy to distribute performance-enhancing drugs.

== Early life ==
Joe Papp was born in 1975 in the Cleveland suburb of Parma, Ohio to Joseph John and Marie Barbara Papp (née Danek). A younger brother, David Anthony, was born in 1979, and the family lived together in Seven Hills, Ohio until October 1983, when they moved to the Pittsburgh suburb of Bethel Park, Pennsylvania. Papp's father, a veteran of the US Army and graduate of the Cleveland State University Nance College of Business, was a systems analyst in the Fisher Body division of General Motors when his position was transferred.

== Cycling career ==
Papp began racing in 1989. In 1994, he joined the United States National Team. He competed internationally, including in Argentina, Australia, Brazil, China, Chile, Cuba, France, Hong Kong, Ireland, Italy, Korea, Macau, Monaco, Panama, Taiwan, Trinidad & Tobago, Turkey, Uruguay, and Venezuela. In 1999, he finished as the first American, and third overall, at the Univest GP. He was the 2002 NYC Championship and Superweek Stage Winner. He finished 3rd overall in the 2002 USCF Criterium Rankings for Elite Men, and first overall in 2003. He was first overall at the 2004 Vuelta a Habana del Este. In 2006, Papp won three stages and briefly led overall at the International 42nd Presidential Cycling Tour of Turkey.

As a result of his doping violation, Papp was disqualified from all results obtained after mid-2001.

== Doping ==
Suspension

Papp served a two-year suspension from competitive cycling in 2006, after the International 42nd Presidential Cycling Tour of Turkey. His urine sample had tested positive for metabolites of testosterone or its precursors (6α-OH-androstenedione 6β-OH-androsterone), at a World Anti-Doping Agency-accredited lab in Ankara, Turkey. He was ineligible to compete in sanctioned cycling events from July 31, 2006 through July 31, 2008. Papp was "disqualified from all competitive results obtained on and subsequent to July 1, 2001," despite testing positive only in 2006, and after having signed an agreement with the United States Anti-Doping Agency (USADA) that negated only results obtained after May 6, 2006. After testifying in the Landis affair, in an interview with Dr. Dawn Richardson in VeloNews, Papp admitted to an extensive doping regime, including anabolic steroids and EPO. He recounted that, in his final race of the season for Team Whistle in Italy, what should have been a routine tumble resulting in bruising and road rash, instead almost cost him his life. The combination of EPO and blood thinners led to hospitalization with internal bleeding, and he admitted to having a hematocrit level of 58.

Landis affair

Papp addresses the media

Rather than contesting his own doping case, Papp met with USADA officer Travis Tygart in early 2007, and agreed to testify in the USADA arbitration hearing examining Floyd Landis' positive result for testosterone at the 2006 Tour de France. He also revealed the identity of two corrupt American doctors who had prescribed him banned drugs. At the Landis hearing, Papp described how synthetic testosterone gel helped him to recover during multi-day stage races. USADA used this testimony to refute earlier claims by Landis' attorneys that testosterone could not help Landis win the 2006 Tour, and that he would be unlikely to use it if he knew the substance was detectable by testing. Papp rebutted both of these claims, saying it was easy to stay below the threshold of a positive test, and that the gel helped him greatly in recovering between stages.

During the hearing, Papp acknowledged systematically doping under the guidance of medical professionals in the United States, Europe and Latin America. He admitted to using EPO, human growth hormone, cortisone, insulin, thyroid hormone, anabolic steroids and amphetamines. The testimony, while not fundamental to the arbitration panel's decision to uphold Landis's conviction, elicited a hostile response. In an interview published in VeloNews, Landis asked interviewer Neal Rogers, "Why did they [USADA] bring in Joe Papp? Who the f--k is that guy?" During the period he was testifying in the Landis case Papp was actively trafficking EPO and HGH.

Leogrande affair

In late 2008, Papp provided physical evidence, including photos and a hand-written note, in USADA's anti-doping case against Kayle Leogrande. Leogrande was given a two-year suspension, after the panel hearing his case found that Papp's corroborative evidence added weight to the testimony of Suzanne Sonye and Frankie Andreu, while contradicting Leogrande.

Longo affair

In September 2011, French sports daily L'Équipe revealed that Patrice Ciprelli, husband and coach of multiple world champion Jeannie Longo, had purchased EPO from China via Papp for his wife. The events dated back to April 2007, with L'Équipe publishing emails exchanges between Papp, a Chinese contact and Ciprelli. Papp himself confirmed the dealings in an interview with L'Équipe and also documented the delivery of EPO to Yolande Ciprelli, a close relative of the couple who lives very near their home in the French Alps. "Ciprelli did not mention her name, but he talked of his wife," Papp told L'Equipe. "I understood that Longo was the beneficiary of the EPO, based on the messages. But he insisted to pay for it himself and that the package should be sent to a third person."

Drug distribution

On February 17, 2010 in United States District Court for the Western District of Pennsylvania, Papp appeared before Gary L. Lancaster, Chief US District Judge, and pleaded guilty to two counts of conspiracy to distribute performance-enhancing drugs, specifically HGH and Erythropoietin (EPO). According to Assistant US Attorney Mary McKeen Houghton, the retail value of the transactions brokered by Papp between Shandong Kexing Bioproducts Corp. and over 180 international clients approached US$80,000 from September 2006 to September 2007 None of the 187 customers, including cyclists, swimmers, runners, triathletes, mixed-martial artists and rowers, were identified in court. Houghton, Papp, and his attorney, William Ward, declined to comment on terms of the plea agreement, which had been sealed by the court – a measure often taken if a defendant is cooperating with the government in ongoing investigations, but neither Ward nor Houghton would say at the time if that was the case. In October 2011, Papp was finally sentenced to serve a six-month period of house arrest, followed by two and half years probation.

== Career after cycling ==
Before his felony criminal convictions for conspiracy to distribute drugs, Papp spoke publicly about the dangers of doping. He has been quoted in Scientific American, the Wall Street Journal, the International Herald Tribune, and the New York Times. He also appeared as a guest on the National Public Radio Talk of the Nation program, and was featured in Outside magazine.

== Other ==
Papp earned a BA in History (summa cum laude) from the University of Pittsburgh, where he was elected to Phi Beta Kappa in 1999. Papp was a Coro Fellow in Public Affairs and graduate student in Carnegie Mellon University’s Heinz College (2000–2001). He considered pursuing a career with the Central Intelligence Agency, and interviewed for a position in the Directorate of Operations in 2000, but returned to professional cycling in 2001. In October 2004, Papp married champion Cuban cyclist Yuliet Rodríguez Jiménez, but they have been separated since December 2006.

Since his suspension for doping, Papp has delivered guest lectures on the topics of supplement use by athletes and gene-doping at Slippery Rock University and at Chatham University, where he is pursuing an MBA and served in the Graduate Student Assembly.

In July 2017, Papp joined a group of Twitter users suing US President Donald Trump for blocking them from his personal @realDonaldTrump account.

He runs several accounts on X.com documenting trans athletes competing in cycling.

== Palmarès ==
2006

- 1st Granfondo Giro di Terra D'Otranto
- 1st Granfondo Pinarello
- 1st KOM competition - Granfondo Max Lelli, Italy
- 1st 2 Stages - International Presidency Tour of Turkey (UCI 2.2)
- 2nd Granfondo Città di Ceriale, Italy
- 2nd Stage 2 - Tour of South China Sea (UCI 2.2)
- 2nd Stage 13 - Vuelta a Cuba (UCI 2.2)
- 2nd Stage 6 - Tour of South China Sea (UCI 2.2)
- 2nd Stage 5 - International Presidency Tour of Turkey (UCI 2.2)
- 2nd Stage 7 - Tour of South China Sea (UCI 2.2)
- 2nd Points Classification - Tour of South China Sea (UCI 2.2)
- 3rd Granfondo Valli Parmensi
- 3rd Medio Fondo Portofino Kulm
- 3rd Stage 10 - Vuelta a Cuba (UCI 2.2)
- 4th Granfondo Selle Italia Prestigio, Italy
- 4th Granfondo Claudio Chiappucci "Giro Valli dell'Alto Verbano"
- 4th Stage 3 - International Presidency Tour of Turkey (UCI 2.2)
- 4th Granfondo Umbria Verde, Italy
- 5th Stage 4 - Tour of South China Sea (UCI 2.2)
- 5th Points Classification - Vuelta a Cuba (UCI 2.2)
- 6th Stage 2 - Volta de Ciclismo Internacional do Estado de São Paulo (UCI 2.2)
- 6th Martin Luther King Classic Criterium
- 7th Granfondo Michele Bartoli
- 7th 5 Stages - Vuelta a Cuba (UCI 2.2)
- 8th Stage 3 - Tour of South China Sea (UCI 2.2)
- 10th Granfondo del Lambrusco Ceci, Italy
- 19th General Classification - Vuelta a Cuba (UCI 2.2)

== See also ==
- List of doping cases in cycling
- List of doping cases in sport
- List of Phi Beta Kappa members by year of admission
