= Kayle Leogrande =

American racing cyclist (born 1977)

Personal information
- Full name: Kayle Leogrande
- Born: March 29, 1977 (age 49) United States
- Height: 1.80 m (5 ft 11 in)
- Weight: 73 kg (161 lb; 11.5 st)

Cycling career
- Sport: Cycling
- Current team: Shockwave
- Discipline: Road
- Role: Rider
- Rider type: Sprinter

Professional teams
- 2005: Jelly Belly–Pool Gel
- 2007–2008: Rock Racing

Major wins
- National Amateur Criterium Championships (2006)

Kayle Leogrande (born March 29, 1977) is an American road racing cyclist. Leogrande was the 2006 winner of the United States National Criterium Championships, and spent two years with the infamous Rock Racing team, having turned professional in 2005 with US domestic squad Jelly Belly–Pool Gel.

Leogrande was embroiled in a doping scandal in 2008, when it was alleged that he confessed his use of performance-enhancing drugs to a team staffer when competing at Superweek on July 26, 2007. Leogrande vigorously contested the charges brought against him by the United States Anti-Doping Agency (USADA), but was suspended for two years after a three-member arbitration panel concluded he had used EPO. Leogrande completed his suspension in late 2010, and returned to racing in 2011. He competed for several masters teams over the next several years, and secured wins in the US Masters Criterium Championships in 2015 and 2016.

In 2017 Leogrande was suspended by USADA for a further 8 years after testing positive for multiple prohibited substances following a win at the Dana Point Grand Prix.

== Cycling career ==
Born in Grand Terrace, California, Leogrande turned professional in 2005 with the Jelly Belly–Pool Gel team, and placed first in the Murrieta Stage Race. He reverted to amateur status in 2006 but won the United States National Criterium Championship in Downers Grove, Illinois. That result and his edgy persona as a muscular professional tattoo-artist with a studio in Upland, California earned Leogrande a return to the professional peloton in 2007, with Michael Ball's new Rock Racing team. There he would race alongside three-time US Olympian Mariano Friedick and seven-time US National Champion Rahsaan Bahati. Under the guidance of then team-manager and confidant Joseph M. Papp, Leogrande promptly won the points classification at the 2007 Redlands Bicycle Classic, where he also finished second in the stage two criterium. He claimed three stages at the International Cycling Classic-Superweek in Wisconsin before finishing second overall. One of Leogrande's most impressive results of the season, however, was his top-10 finish at the CSC International, alongside a field that included European professionals: he took 8th.

Leogrande remained with a completely revamped Rock Racing for the 2008 season, but attracted attention less for his riding than for allegations of doping and lawsuits. He collected a few podium finishes in minor races, but did climb to 6th in the USPRO National Criterium Championship, the professional version of which he'd won two years before.

== Doping ==
Leogrande admitted doping began as early as 2006 via his eventual confession of purchasing EPO from Joseph M. Papp. Leogrande won the USA Cycling amateur criterium championship that year. In 2007, he joined Rock Racing and began doping more regularly, and subsequently won the USA Cycling professional criterium championship. In July 2007, Leogrande was given a surprise drug test and he confided in Rock Racing souigneur Suzanne Sonye his uneasiness about testing positive due to his doping program. Leogrande's test came back negative, but Sonye reported his confession to USADA. Her testimony, and evidence provided by Papp (photographs of Leogrande with EPO and a handwritten note) led to Leogrande's downfall. Travis Tygart, CEO of USADA, claims that without Leogrande's admission to Sonye, the USADA case against Lance Armstrong may have never happened.

In January 2008 Leogrande made headlines when he was revealed to be the anonymous rider filing a lawsuit against USADA, seeking to prevent the testing of his B-sample from a urinalysis taken at Superweek the previous year, which was thought to contain evidence of EPO. The A-sample had tested negative for performance-enhancing drugs but USADA claimed the right to test the B-sample regardless, already suspecting that Leogrande had doped. USADA refrained from testing the backup sample and the suit was dismissed – but the anti-doping agency still charged the rider with a doping violation.,

Later in the year, Leogrande filed a defamation claim against former Rock Racing soigneur Suzanne Sonye. Leogrande also sued former professional cyclist Matt DeCanio for defamation. However, the USADA case against him went forward, and it was alleged that he had confessed his use of performance-enhancing drugs to Sonye when competing at Superweek on July 26, 2007. Though Leogrande denied the charges, he was suspended for two years after a three-member arbitration panel concluded he had in fact used EPO. Leogrande's "non-analytical" positive doping control was of note because it was based not matching A and B urine samples that showed traces of drug metabolites, but rather, sworn testimony from Sonye and Rock Racing team director Frankie Andreu and ancillary evidence such as cellphone records detailing calls between Leogrande and Papp plus their hand-written correspondence.

On August 28, 2017 it was announced that Leogrande had been suspended for a further eight years by the US Anti Doping Agency after testing positive for seven substances (anti-estrogen drug – raloxifene, four Selective Androgen Receptor Modulators: ostarine, RAD140, LGD4033 and andarine, ibutamoren (a growth hormone-like factor), and GW1516 sulfone) at an amateur race earlier that year.

== Other ==
Leogrande began tattooing in 1998, and has owned several tattoo establishments in the southern California region since 2005.

== See also ==
- List of doping cases in cycling
- List of sportspeople sanctioned for doping offences
