= Justin Williams (cyclist) =

American cyclist (born 1989)

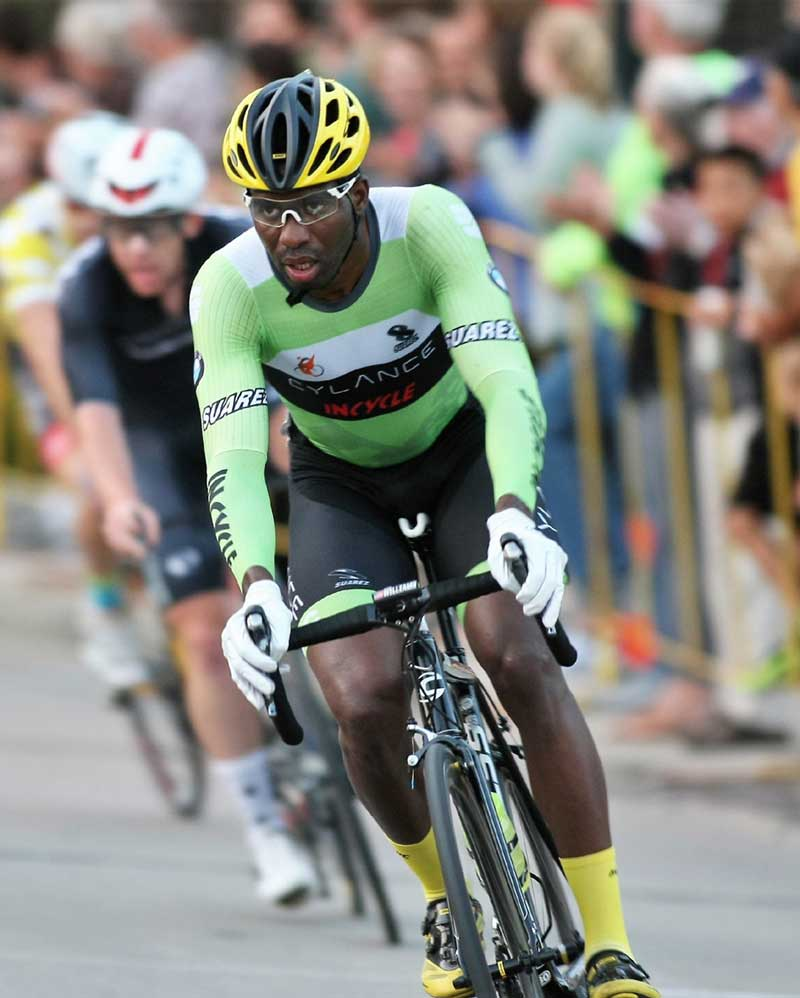

Personal information
- Born: May 26, 1989 (age 37) Los Angeles, California, United States
- Height: 6 ft 1 in
- Weight: 175 lb

Cycling career
- Sport: Cycling
- Current team: L39ION of Los Angeles
- Disciplines: Road; Track
- Role: Rider; Manager
- Rider type: Sprinter

Amateur team
- 2007–2009: Rock Racing

Professional teams
- 2010: Trek–Livestrong
- 2014–2015: Astellas
- 2016–2017: Cylance Pro Cycling
- 2018: Specialized–Rocket Espresso
- 2019–: L39ION of Los Angeles

Managerial team
- 2019–: L39ION of Los Angeles

Major wins
- One-day races and Classics Belizean National Road Race Championships (2021) 11 US National Championships 14 California State Road and Track Champion

Justin Williams (born May 26, 1989) is a Belizean-American cyclist who currently is a rider-manager for UCI Continental team L39ION of Los Angeles. He began racing as a teen and won multiple amateur US National Championships in track, road, and criterium. He focuses on increasing the diversity of the sport and founded and manages a team in order to mentor young African American and Hispanic riders.

== Career ==
Williams grew up in South Central Los Angeles. His parents were immigrants from Belize. Williams played football with his cousins growing up, but his football career was ended by injury and the disapproval of his mother.

Williams's father was an amateur bike racer, and Williams took up riding to try to connect with his father. Williams's first bike ride was planned to be 70 miles along the Pacific Coast Highway but it ended when he cramped up after 50 miles. His father rode away and left Williams on the side of the road where his aunt picked him up. Williams understood the message his father was trying to convey: "Racing bikes is hard and you need to be serious about it." He began racing a few months later. Williams knew there were not a lot of opportunities for black men in South-Central and saw cycling as a means to avoid getting in trouble with the law.

Williams did well in the sport, winning many criteriums in California as a teen. His goal was to join the US National Team, but felt that they ignored him despite his racing results. Williams eventually made the team after winning the 2006 Junior Track National Championship in keirin. The National Team wanted Williams to focus on track cycling but he loved road racing and wanted to continue training for that.

As a teen, Williams's father had introduced him to racer Rahsaan Bahati, and it was from Bahati that Williams realized he could go professional and race in Europe. Williams joined the Rock Racing team in 2007 — the same team his mentor Bahati raced for — while still racing with the national team. Rock Racing folded in 2009 and Williams moved to Axel Merckx’s Trek-Livestrong development team for the 2010 racing season. In 2010, Williams went to Europe where he had success in Kermesse races in Belgium. He was a domestique for Taylor Phinney in the 2010 Paris–Roubaix Espoirs race that Phinney won. Although the national team coaches felt that Williams had a lot of potential, Williams decided not to go back to Europe after flying home to visit his family during the 2010 season.

Williams had developed a reputation for being "hard to deal with", but he contends it was in part due to being a young sprinter who needed guidance and part due to him being stereotyped as an "angry black man". With his professional career seemingly ended when he left the national team, Williams moved back to California and attended Moorpark College. He raced for a few low level teams during this time, but did not have much success.

William's younger brother, Cory Williams, joined Cylance Pro Cycling and convinced them to hire Justin Williams as well. Williams was hesitant to get back into professional racing, but saw it as a good opportunity to support his brother. Despite his initial trepidation, Williams had a breakout season, winning 15 races. Cylance promised Williams they would keep Cory on the team, but they cut him after one year. Williams was contractually obligated to continue racing, and although he debated sandbagging he decided that "I don't win for them, I win for me" and had another stellar season, racking up 14 wins.

In 2018, Williams signed with Specialized-Rocket Espresso fixie criterium racing team at the Red Hook Crit. He felt instantly at home with the other team members, and appreciated the lack of politics and drama that he had tired of on the UCI circuit. The team allowed Williams to compete as an independent rider in road races as well. Williams won both the amateur road race and criterium national championships in 2018. He placed in the top 3 in 30 of the 35 races he rode that year.

In 2019, Williams founded his own team, L39ION of Los Angeles, where he is both the manager and primary sprinter. The team is a mix of professional cyclists and development riders, many from South-Central LA, as well as both of Williams's brothers. The "39" in the name represents 39th Street, where Williams grew up. Williams once again won the amateur criterium national championship.

Williams found racing at the pro level difficult because he was the only minority, and that made him want to make the sport of cycling "great for everyone". This experience led him to work for increased inclusion and innovation in cycling. As part of that effort, he mentors African American and Hispanic riders on his development team, Endo CNCPT.

In June 2021, Williams officially changed his UCI nationality to Belize, and won the Belizean national road race championships later that month.

In August 2022, Williams was suspended from racing for 5 months as a result of his engaging in a fist fight with other racers at the Salt Lake Criterium.

In August 2023, USA Cycling announced an investigation into Williams and Thomas Gibbons regarding a crash and confrontation that happened at the Denver Audi Littleton Criterium. Video footage taken by riders within the field depicted Williams deviating from the racing line, making contact with Gibbons, and pushing Gibbons to the outside curb where both riders ultimately crashed. Gibbons required emergency medical treatment as a result of the crash. In September 2023, USA Cycling announced a 60 day suspension for Williams, beginning April 4, 2024, as a result of his conduct.

== Major results ==
2006
National Junior Track Championships

1st Keirin
1st Match sprint
1st Team pursuit
1st Team sprint

2007
National Junior Track Championships

1st Keirin
1st Team pursuit

2008
1st Keirin, National Amateur Track Championships
1st Criterium, National Under-23 Road Championships
1st Stage 3 Valley of the Sun Stage Race
2nd Keirin, National Track Championships
2009
1st Team pursuit, National Track Championships
2014
1st Stages 4 & 5 Tour of America's Dairyland
2016
1st Stages 1b & 3 North Star Grand Prix
1st San Rafael Sunset Criterium
1st Manhattan Beach Grand Prix
2017
1st Dana Point Grand Prix
1st Stage 2 Tour de Delta
1st Stage 4 North Star Grand Prix
1st Stage 8 Tour of America's Dairyland
1st Stages 1 & 3 Oklahoma City Classic
2018
National Amateur Road Championships

1st Road race
1st Criterium

1st Overall Tour de Murrieta

1st Stage 1

1st Harlem Skyscraper Classic
1st Sequoia Cycling Classic
1st Ladera Ranch Grand Prix
1st Manhattan Beach Grand Prix
1st Stages 1 & 4 Chico Stage Race
2019
1st Road race, National Amateur Road Championships
1st Harlem Skyscraper Classic
1st Salt Lake Criterium
1st Littleton Twilight Criterium
2nd Overall Tulsa Tough

1st Blue Dome Crit
1st Tulsa Arts Crit
2nd Omnium

2021
1st Road race, Belize National Road Championships
2023
1st Stage 3 Valley of the Sun Stage Race
1st Blue Dome Crit Tulsa Tough
