= Sam Boardman =

American cyclist

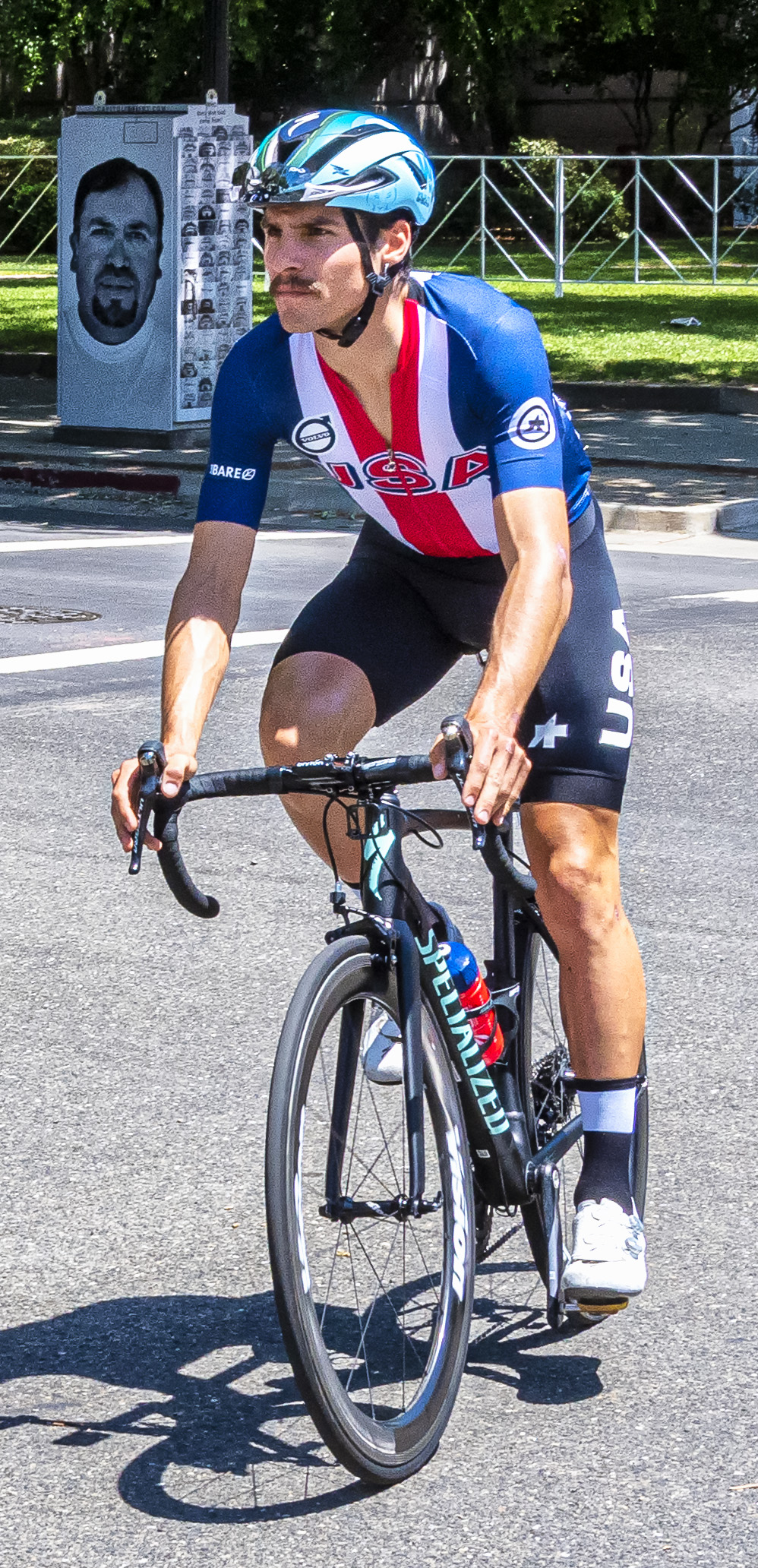
- Boardman at the 2019 Tour of California

Personal information
- Full name: Samuel Boardman
- Born: September 8, 1995 (age 31) Washington, D.C., U.S.

Cycling career
- Sport: Cycling
- Current team: Modern Adventure Pro Cycling
- Discipline: Road
- Role: Rider

Amateur teams
- 2016: Kingsnorth International Wheelers
- 2017: Herbalife p/b Marc Pro–Nature's B
- 2018: Support Clean Sport–Sea Sucker–Gut
- 2018: Marc Pro Cycling

Professional teams
- 2019–2020: Wildlife Generation Pro Cycling p/b Maxxis
- 2021–2023: L39ION of Los Angeles
- 2024–2025: Project Echelon Racing
- 2026–: Modern Adventure Pro Cycling

Samuel Boardman (born September 8, 1995) is an American cyclist, who currently rides for UCI ProTeam Modern Adventure Pro Cycling. He competed as a runner until college when he began cycling, after being unable to make the team at UCLA, where he attended college. He turned professional in 2019 with Wildlife Generation Pro Cycling p/b Maxxis, and competed in the Tour of Utah and Tour of California that year.

== Major results ==
2017
5th Overall Tour of Poyang Lake
2018
2nd Overall Chico Stage Race
5th Overall San Dimas Stage Race
2019
1st Stage 2 Tour of Murrieta
2nd Overall Tour of Poyang Lake

1st Stage 3

3rd Overall San Dimas Stage Race
4th Overall Redlands Bicycle Classic
2022
1st Stage 3 (ITT) Joe Martin Stage Race
2023
3rd Sea Otter Classic Gravel
5th Road race, National Road Championships
