= Winston-Salem Cycling Classic =

American one-day road cycling race

Race details
- Date: June (2013); April (2014); Memorial Day (2015–2019); September (2021)
- Region: United States
- Discipline: Road
- Competition: UCI America Tour
- Type: One day race
- Web site: www.winstonsalemcycling.com

History
- First edition: 2013
- Editions: 8 (as of 2021)
- First winner: Daniel Patten (USA)
- Most wins: No repeat winners
- Most recent: Ama Nsek (USA); Spencer Moavenzadeh (USA)

The Winston-Salem Cycling Classic is a one-day race held annually since 2013 in Winston-Salem, North Carolina in the United States. In 2019, it was rated as a 1.2 race by the Union Cycliste Internationale (UCI), and was part of the UCI America Tour.

== Winners ==
=== Road race ===
| Year | Country | Rider | Team |
|---|---|---|---|
| 2013 | United States | Daniel Patten | Team Smartstop–Mountain Khakis |
| 2014 | United States | Travis McCabe | Team SmartStop |
| 2015 | Latvia | Toms Skujiņš | Hincapie Racing Team |
| 2016 | Canada | Ryan Roth | Silber Pro Cycling Team |
| 2017 | United States | Robin Carpenter | Holowesko Citadel Racing Team |
| 2018 | United States | Sam Bassetti | Elevate–KHS Pro Cycling |
| 2019 | Mexico | Ulises Alfredo Castillo | Elevate–KHS Pro Cycling |
| 2020 | No race due to the COVID-19 pandemic in North Carolina | | |
| 2021 | No race | | |

=== Criterium ===
| Year | Country | Rider | Team |
|---|---|---|---|
| 2013 | Argentina | Ricardo Escuela | Predator Carbon Repair |
| 2014 | Belgium | Brecht Dhaene | Astellas |
| 2015 | United States | Bradley White | UnitedHealthcare |
| 2016 | United States | John Murphy | UnitedHealthcare |
| 2017 | United States | Tyler Magner | Holowesko Citadel Racing Team |
| 2018 | United States | Colin Joyce | Rally Cycling |
| 2019 | United States | Stephen Bassett | First Internet Bank Cycling |
| 2020 | No race due to the COVID-19 pandemic in North Carolina | | |
| 2021 (Day 1) | United States | Ama Nsek | L39ION of Los Angeles |
| 2021 (Day 2) | United States | Spencer Moavenzadeh | ButcherBox Cycling |
