= Cory Williams (cyclist) =

American cyclist (born 1993)

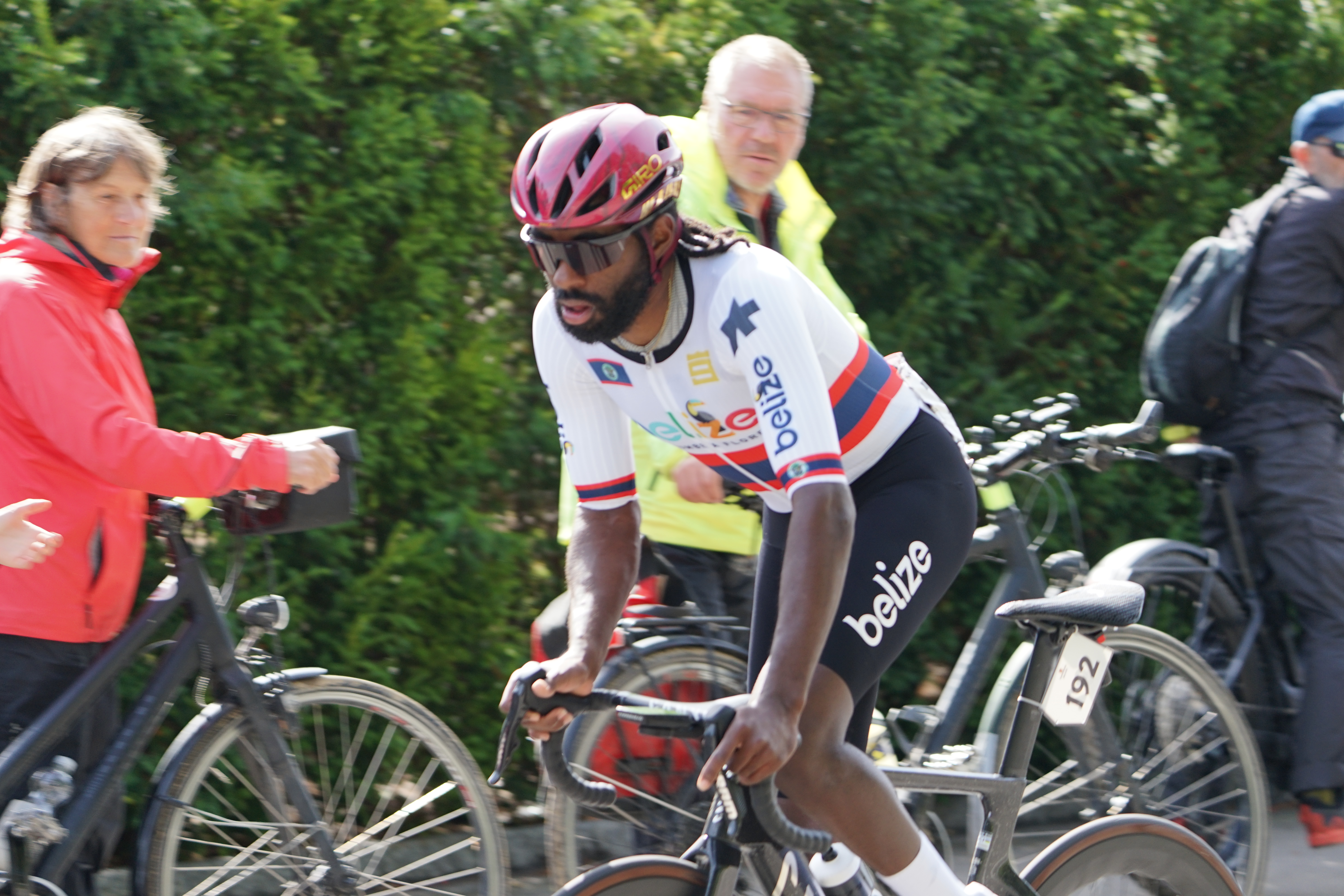
- Williams 2024 at the World Championships

Personal information
- Born: August 9, 1993 (age 33) Los Angeles, California, U.S.

Cycling career
- Sport: Cycling
- Current team: L39ION of Los Angeles
- Discipline: Road
- Role: Rider
- Rider type: Sprinter

Amateur teams
- 2011: Major Motion CC
- 2012: Southern California Velo
- 2013: SC Velo MRI Endurance
- 2014: KHS–Maxxis–Jakroo

Professional teams
- 2015–2016: InCycle–Cannondale
- 2017–2018: Elevate–KHS Pro Cycling
- 2019–: L39ION of Los Angeles

Cory Williams (born August 9, 1993) is a Belizean-American cyclist, who currently rides for UCI Continental team L39ION of Los Angeles. He helped to establish the team in 2019 alongside his brother Justin Williams with the goal of increasing diversity and inclusion in cycling. A sprinter, Williams specializes in one-day and criterium races.

== Major results ==
2014
1st Barrio Logan Grand Prix
1st Torrance Criterium
1st Barry Wolfe Grand Prix
2015
1st Stage 3 San Dimas Stage Race
3rd Overall Tour of Murrieta

1st Stages 2 & 3

2016
1st Roger Millikan Memorial Criterium
2017
1st Manhattan Beach Grand Prix
1st Stage 2 Tour of Murrieta
1st Carlos Soto Memorial Criterium
1st Ontario Mid Season Criterium
2018
1st Crystal Cup
1st Stage 4 Sea Otter Classic
1st Ontario Icebreaker Grand Prix
1st Roger Millikan Memorial Criterium
1st Ontario Season End Criterium
3rd Dana Point Grand Prix
2019
1st Manhattan Beach Grand Prix
1st Brackett Grand Prix
1st Ontario End of Season Criterium
1st Stage 3 Valley of the Sun Stage Race
2nd Overall Tour of Murrieta
2020
1st Overall Tour of Murrieta

1st Stage 1

1st Stage 3 Valley of the Sun Stage Race
1st Santa Barbara County Road Race
2021
1st Overall Tulsa Tough

1st Stage 2
