= Sam Bassetti =

American cyclist (born 1991)

Personal information
- Full name: Samuel Bassetti
- Born: April 2, 1991 (age 35) Santa Rosa, California, United States

Cycling career
- Sport: Cycling
- Current team: Elevate–Webiplex Pro Cycling
- Discipline: Road
- Role: Rider

Amateur teams
- 2009: All Sport–Swift
- 2010: ALA–Lombardi Sport
- 2011: Firefighters–Formigli
- 2012–2013: California Giant–Specialized
- 2016–2017: Herbalife–Marc Pro–Nature's Babery

Professional teams
- 2014: 5-hour Energy
- 2015: IRT Racing
- 2018–: Elevate–KHS Pro Cycling

Samuel Bassetti (born April 2, 1991 in Santa Rosa, California) is an American cyclist, who currently rides for UCI Continental team Elevate–Webiplex Pro Cycling.

== Major results ==
2017
Tour of Poyang Lake

1st Stages 2, 8 & 11

2018
1st Winston Salem Cycling Classic
1st Points classification Joe Martin Stage Race
1st Stage 3 Redlands Bicycle Classic
1st Stage 3 San Dimas Stage Race
1st Stage 1 Tulsa Tough
3rd National Criterium Championships
2019
1st Overall Tulsa Tough

1st Stage 3

1st White Spot / Delta Road Race
