= Clever Martínez =

Venezuelan cyclist

Personal information
- Full name: Clever José Martínez Moros
- Born: 27 November 1990 (age 35)

Cycling career
- Sport: Cycling
- Current team: CRCA–Foundation
- Disciplines: Road; Track
- Role: Rider

Amateur teams
- 2015: JHS Grupo–Andiempaques
- 2016–2017: Fundación Orgullo Andino–9 Grados
- 2017–2019: Gobernación de Carabobo
- 2019: Team Raiders
- 2020: Asodoci–NY Usa
- 2021: Rockland Cycling Velo
- 2022: Miami Blazers
- 2025–: CRCA–Foundation

Professional teams
- 2021: Gios
- 2023–2024: Miami Nights
Medal record
Men's track cycling
Representing Venezuela
Pan American Championships
| Silver medal – second place | 2025 Asunción | Omnium |
| Silver medal – second place | 2026 Santiago | Elimination |
| Bronze medal – third place | 2017 Couva | Scratch |
| Bronze medal – third place | 2025 Asunción | Scratch |
Central American and Caribbean Games
| Silver medal – second place | 2026 Santo Domingo | Madison |
| Bronze medal – third place | 2026 Santo Domingo | Team pursuit |
Bolivarian Games
| Gold medal – first place | 2025 Lima-Ayacucho | Omnium |

Clever José Martínez Moros (born 27 November 1990) is a Venezuelan road and track cyclist.

Martínez currently lives and trains in the United States, where he has taken a number of wins on the national calendar including the Tour of America's Dairyland and the Athens Twilight Criterium. He competed in four events at the 2025 UCI Track Cycling World Championships after having won two medals at the Pan American Championships that spring.

== Major results ==
=== Road ===
2018
3rd Road race, National Championships
4th Road race, Central American and Caribbean Games
9th Overall Vuelta a Venezuela
2019
1st Overall Tour of Tobago

1st Stage 4

1st Stage 8 Vuelta a Venezuela
2020
2nd Overall Vuelta a la Independencia Nacional
2021
1st Overall Tour of America's Dairyland

1st Stages 1 & 2

1st Piedmont Criterium
3rd Tulsa Tough
2022
1st Overall Intelligentsia Cup

1st Stages 3 & 6

2nd Overall Gateway Cup

1st Stage 4

2nd Tour de Murrieta
3rd Harlem Skyscraper Classic
2023
2nd Overall Vuelta a Venezuela
2nd Littleton Criterium
2025
1st Athens Twilight Criterium
3rd Manhattan Beach Grand Prix

=== Track ===
2014
3rd Team pursuit, South American Games
2016
National Championships

2nd Individual pursuit
2nd Scratch

2017
3rd Scratch, Pan American Championships
3rd Team pursuit, Bolivarian Games
2018
Central American and Caribbean Games

2nd Team pursuit
3rd Madison
3rd Points race

South American Games

3rd Madison
3rd Team pursuit

2019
National Championships

1st Individual pursuit
2nd Scratch
2nd Omnium
2nd Madison (with Máximo Rojas)

2023
National Championships

1st Scratch
1st Omnium
1st Madison (with Máximo Rojas)
1st Team pursuit
2nd Individual pursuit
2nd Team sprint
3rd Elimination race

2025
National Championships

1st Elimination race
1st Omnium
1st Madison (with Yoisnerth Rondón)
2nd Individual pursuit

Pan American Championships

2nd Omnium
3rd Scratch

1st Omnium Bolivarian Games
2026
Central American and Caribbean Games

2nd Madison
3rd Team pursuit
