= Ken Hanson (cyclist) =

American cyclist (born 1982)

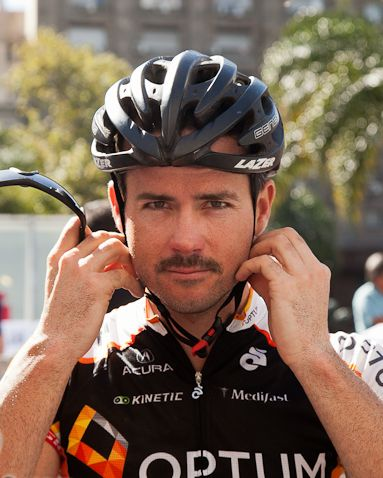
- Hanson in 2012

Personal information
- Full name: Kenneth Hanson
- Born: April 14, 1982 (age 44) Sierra Madre, California
- Height: 1.77 m (5 ft 10 in)
- Weight: 74 kg (163 lb)

Cycling career
- Sport: Cycling
- Current team: Retired
- Discipline: Road
- Role: Rider
- Rider type: Sprinter

Professional teams
- 2007: BMC Racing Team
- 2009–2010: Team Type 1
- 2011: Jelly Belly–Kenda
- 2012–2013: Optum–Kelly Benefit Strategies
- 2014–2015: UnitedHealthcare

Kenneth Hanson (born April 14, 1982, in Sierra Madre, California) is an American former cyclist.

== Major results ==
2007
1st Stage 2b (TTT) Giro del Friuli Venezia Giulia
2008
1st Stage 1 Rás Tailteann
1st Stage 2 Priority Health Grand Cycling Challenge
2009
1st Wells Fargo Twilight Criterium
2nd Clarendon Cup
3rd Manhattan Beach Grand Prix
2010
1st Stage 5 Nature Valley Grand Prix
2011
1st Stage 9 Tour de Korea
2nd Overall Tulsa Tough

1st Stage 2

3rd Glencoe Grand Prix
2012
1st Overall Tulsa Tough

1st Stage 1

1st Manhattan Beach Grand Prix
1st Gastown Grand Prix
1st Herman Miller Grand Cycling Classic
1st Gooikse Pijl
Vuelta del Uruguay

1st Stages 1, 5, 6 & 10

Tour de Korea

1st Stages 7 & 8

Tour of Elk Grove

1st Stages 2 & 3

3rd De Kustpijl Heist
2013
1st GP LabMed
1st Gastown Grand Prix
1st Stage 3 McLane Pacific Classic
1st Stage 3 Volta ao Alentejo
3rd Vuelta a La Rioja
