= Alicia Thompson (cyclist) =

Belizean cyclist

Personal information
- Born: 8 April 1981 (age 45) Belize

Cycling career
- Sport: Cycling
- Disciplines: Road; Mountain biking
- Role: Rider

Alicia Thompson (born 8 April 1981) is a Belizean racing cyclist. She is a six-time national champion, winning four time trial titles and two road race titles.

== Major results ==
2008
2nd Road race, National Road Championships
2009
3rd Road race, National Road Championships
2010
National Road Championships

2nd Road race
2nd Time trial

2014
3rd Time trial, National Road Championships
2015
National Road Championships

1st Time trial
3rd Road race

2016
1st Time trial, National Road Championships
2017
National Road Championships

1st Time trial
3rd Road race

2018
National Road Championships

1st Road race
2nd Time trial

2019
3rd Time trial, National Road Championships
2021
National Road Championships

1st Road race
3rd Time trial

2022
National Road Championships

1st Time trial
2nd Road race
