= L39ION of Los Angeles =

American cycling team

Team information
- UCI code: LLA
- Registered: United States
- Founded: 2019
- Discipline: Road
- Status: Domestic Elite (2019–2020); UCI Continental (2021–)
- Bicycles: Specialized (2019–)

Key personnel
- Team manager: Justin Williams

Team name history
- 2019–: L39ION of Los Angeles

Legion of Los Angeles (stylized as L39ION of Los Angeles) is a UCI Continental cycling team based in the United States. It was founded in 2019 by brothers Justin Williams and Cory Williams with the goal of increasing diversity and inclusion in cycling. The "39" in the name represents 39th Street in Los Angeles, where the Williams brothers grew up.

It was announced in November 2020 that the team would be stepping up to UCI Continental level in 2021, while a women's team would also be formed.

The team has been involved in numerous controversies, with Justin Williams being suspended by USAC twice for fighting with opponents.

== Team rosters ==
=== Men's Continental team ===
As of June 3, 2023.

Rider	Date of birth
Sam Boardman (USA)	September 8, 1995 (age 30)
Robin Carpenter (USA)	June 20, 1992 (age 34)
Alec Cowan (CAN)	November 19, 1996 (age 29)
Eder Frayre (MEX)	October 20, 1991 (age 34)
Lance Haidet (USA)	December 23, 1997 (age 28)
Gavin Hoover (USA)	July 12, 1997 (age 29)

Rider	Date of birth
Tyler Magner (USA)	May 3, 1991 (age 35)
Kyle Murphy (USA)	October 5, 1991 (age 34)
Cory Williams (USA)	August 9, 1993 (age 33)
Justin Williams (BIZ)	May 26, 1989 (age 37)
Tyler Williams (USA)	November 17, 1994 (age 31)

=== Women's team ===
As of November 2, 2020.

Rider	Date of birth
Kendall Ryan (USA)	August 10, 1992 (age 34)
Skylar Schneider (USA)	September 3, 1998 (age 28)

== Major wins ==
=== Men ===
2019
Harlem Skyscraper Classic, Justin Williams
Stage 3 Valley of the Sun Stage Race, Cory Williams
Stages 1 & 2 Tulsa Tough, Justin Williams

2020
Overall Tour of Murrieta, Cory Williams

Stages 1 & 2, Cory Williams

2021
Mexico National Road Race Championships, Eder Frayre
Belize National Road Race Championships, Justin Williams
Boise Criterium, Justin Williams
Overall Prairie State Series, Tyler Magner

Stage 1, Alexander Cowan
Stages 3, 5, 6, 7 & 8, Tyler Magner

Littleton Criterium, Cory Williams
Athens Criterium, Tyler Williams
Overall Joe Martin Stage Race, Tyler Williams

Stage 1, Tyler Williams

Overall Gateway Cup, Cory Williams

Stages 1, 2, 3 & 4, Cory Williams

Overall Tulsa Tough, Cory Williams

Stage 1, Justin Williams
Stage 2, Cory Williams
Stage 3, Tyler Williams

Overall Pro Road Tour, Tyler Williams
Sea Otter Classic

Stage 1, Alexander Cowan
Stage 2, Freddy Ovett

2022
Stage 3 Joe Martin Stage Race, Sam Boardman

=== Women ===
2021
United States National Criterium Championships, Kendall Ryan
Overall Tulsa Tough, Skylar Schneider

Stage 1, Skylar Schneider
Stage 2, Kendall Ryan
Stage 3, Skylar Schneider

Overall Joe Martin Stage Race, Skylar Schneider

Stages 1 & 4, Skylar Schneider

Barbados National Road Race Championships, Amber Joseph
Barbados National Time Trial Championships, Amber Joseph
Caribbean Road Race Championships, Amber Joseph

2022
Stage 1 Joe Martin Stage Race, Skylar Schneider
Barbados National Road Race Championships, Amber Joseph
Barbados National Time Trial Championships, Amber Joseph

== World, Continental & National Championships ==
=== Men ===
2021
Mexico Road Race, Eder Frayre
Belize Road Race, Justin Williams

=== Women ===
2021
United States Criterium, Kendall Ryan
Barbados Road Race, Amber Joseph
Barbados Time Trial, Amber Joseph

2022
Barbados Time Trial, Amber Joseph
Barbados Road Race, Amber Joseph
