= De Rosa (bicycle company) =

Italian bicycle manufacturer

Coordinates: 45.5443029°N 9.1820224°E

- Type: Private
- Industry: Bicycle industry
- Founded: 1953; 73 years ago, Milan
- Founder: Ugo De Rosa
- Headquarters: Milan, Italy
- Area served: Worldwide
- Products: Bicycles and related components
- Website: derosa.it

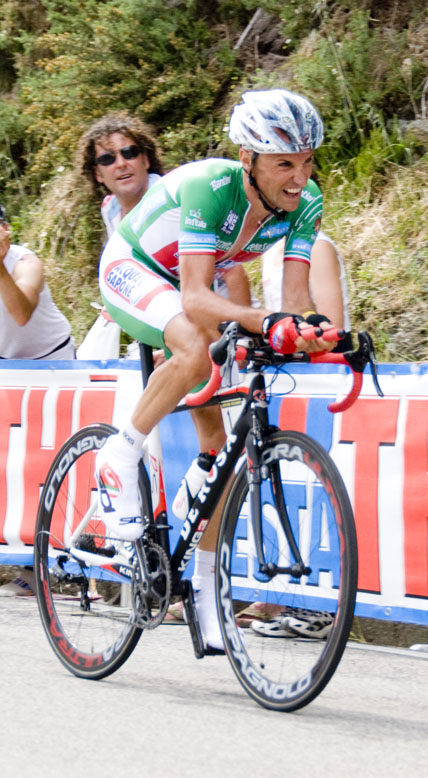
Stefano Garzelli on a De Rosa bicycle during the 2009 Giro d'Italia.

De Rosa Ugo & Figli Srl is an Italian bicycle manufacturer founded in 1953 by Ugo De Rosa in Milan. The company is known for producing high-quality road racing bicycles. It began as a small workshop and gained recognition in the 1950s and 1960s by supplying bicycles to professional cycling teams. In the 1970s, De Rosa collaborated with the Molteni team and rider Eddy Merckx, contributing to several major race victories.

== History ==
Company founder Ugo De Rosa was born on January 27, 1934, in Milan, Italy. Before becoming a noted bicycle frame builder, he was also an amateur racer.

De Rosa's passion for racing led him to study mechanics and engineering at a technical college, and in 1953 he opened his first shop and commenced the manufacture of racing bicycles. In 1958 he was asked by the famous cyclist Raphaël Géminiani to build him a bike for the upcoming Giro d'Italia. Following on from this initial interest, De Rosa bikes became a fixture in the professional peloton of the 1960s. The Faema team was the first team to ride De Rosa frames. Other De Rosa teams of the decade included Tbac (1964) and Max Majer (1967).

In 1969 De Rosa was approached by Gianni Motta, who wanted to engage De Rosa as his frame builder and mechanic. De Rosa accepted and became the bicycle supplier to Motta's team as well. It was during this period that one of the greatest stars of cycling was rising - Eddy Merckx. DeRosa built some frames for Merckx around this time, but it was not until 1973 that their relationship was formalized and De Rosa became the official frame builder and mechanic for the Molteni team which Merckx captained. Merckx and his teammates won nearly all the major European races including the Tour de France, the Giro d'Italia, Milan–San Remo and the World Championship. This partnership with Molteni remained in effect until Merckx's retirement in 1978. In 1981 De Rosa worked as technical consultant to Merckx, who began his own bicycle manufacturing company.

In 1974 Francesco Moser engaged De Rosa for his Filotex team, and went on to win the World Championship. Later, in 1982 De Rosa sponsored the Sammontana team led by Moreno Argentin and Giovanbattista Baronchelli. From 1985 to 1989 De Rosa worked with the Ariostea team - a small start-up team which would later become dominant in European racing.

== Growth ==
Demand for De Rosa bicycles from new markets skyrocketed in the 1980s - including the United States, Russia, Japan, Belgium, and Germany. Subsequently, De Rosa's company outgrew the small workshop adjacent to his home, and moved to a larger space in Cusano Milanino, Milan. Later, his three sons entered the business, with Danilo and Doriano assisting in production management, and Cristiano taking over the commercial side of the business.

== Development ==
In 1990 Ugo De Rosa began research and development in titanium tubing, culminating in a new model, the De Rosa Titanio, used by the Gewiss–Ballan team in 1994. Aluminium and carbon fiber frames were added to the product line in 1996 and 2000 respectively. In 2005 De Rosa launched its Corum frame, a lightweight steel frame built using contemporary frame building techniques.

On December 10, 2007, it was announced that the UCI Continental team, Team LPR would be riding De Rosa bicycles for the upcoming season. UCI Continental team Rock Racing rode De Rosa bicycles up until the end of 2008.

For the 2018 UCI Season, De Rosa returned to professional cycling and sponsors the spanish pro-contintal team Caja Rural-Seguros RGA.

For the 2020 UCI Season, De Rosa became an official supplier of road bikes for Cofidis, a World Tour team. This has led to a stage win in the 2021 Giro d'Italia for Lafay.
