= Tour de Murrieta =

Race details
- Date: March
- Region: Murrieta, California
- Discipline: Road
- Competition: National calendar
- Type: Stage race

History
- First edition: 2005
- Editions: 20 (as of 2024)
- First winner: Curtis Gunn (USA)
- Most wins: Cory Williams (BLZ) (3 wins)
- Most recent: Scott Redding (GBR)

History (women)
- First winner: Dotsie Bausch (USA)
- Most wins: No repeat winners
- Most recent: Rebecca Lang (USA)

The Tour de Murrieta is a multi-day cycling race held annually in March around Murrieta, California.

== Winners ==
=== Men ===
Year	Winner	Second	Third
2005	(United States) Curtis Gunn	(United States) Erik Saunders	(Canada) Jacob Erker
2006	(United States) Jeremiah Wiscovitch	(United States) Daniel Ramsey	(United States) Chris DeMarchi
2007	(United States) Christian Walker	(United States) Arjuna Flenner	(United States) Bryson Perry
2008	(Australia) Jonathan Cantwell	(Canada) Dominique Rollin	(United States) Rahsaan Bahati
2009	(United States) Chad Beyer	(Australia) Jonathan Cantwell	(United States) Rahsaan Bahati
2010	(Australia) Karl Menzies	(Australia) Jonathan Cantwell	(Argentina) Aníbal Borrajo
2011	(United States) Sean Mazich	(United States) Eric Marcotte	(Canada) Nic Hamilton
2012	(United States) David Santos	(Germany) Michael Weicht	(South Africa) Christiaan Kriek
2013	(South Africa) Christiaan Kriek	(United States) Sean Mazich	(Moldova) Serghei Tvetcov
2014	(United States) Kirk Carlsen	(United States) Ian Burnett	(Mexico) Fabrizio Von Nacher
2015	(Mexico) Ulises Castillo	(United States) Chris Barton	(United States) Cory Williams
2016	(Mexico) Ulises Castillo	(United States) Justin Oien	(United States) Ben Wolfe
2017	(New Zealand) Callum Gordon	(United States) Cory Lockwood	(Mexico) René Corella
2018	(United States) Justin Williams	(United States) Orlando Garibay	(United States) Tyler Locke
2019	(United States) Sean McElroy	(United States) Cory Williams	(Mexico) Alfredo Rodríguez
2020	(United States) Cory Williams	(United States) Tyler Williams	(United States) Justin Williams
2021	(United States) Ama Nsek	(United States) Osvaldo Mora	(United States) Ryan Jastrab
2022	(United States) Cory Williams	(Venezuela) Clever Martínez	(United States) Sean McElroy
2023	(Belize) Cory Williams	(United States) Ryan Gorman	(United States) Taylor Warren
2024	(United Kingdom) Scott Redding	(United States) Lucas Bourgoyne	(Mexico) Juan Enrique Aldapa

=== Women ===
Year	Winner	Second	Third
2006	(United States) Dotsie Cowden	(Canada) Laura Yoisten	(United States) Carol Lynn Neal
2014	(Canada) Lex Albrecht	(United States) Julie Cutts	(United States) Jessica Noyola
2015	(United States) Amber Gaffney	(United States) Mary Elizabeth Maroon	(United States) Pamela Schuster
2016	(United States) Gretchen Stumhofer	(Canada) Alison Jackson	(United States) Scotti Lechuga
2017	(United States) Kristabel Doebel-Hickok	(United States) Holly Breck	(United States) Esther Walker
2018	(United States) Shelby Reynolds	(United States) Esther Walker	(Mexico) Lizbeth Ureño
2019	(United States) Holly Breck	(United States) Silvia Fernanda Polanco	(Mexico) Antonieta Gaxiola
2020	(Canada) Claire Cameron	(United States) Kaia Schmid	(United States) Maddy Ward
2021	(United States) Shelby Reynolds	(United States) Hayley Bates	Charity Chia
2022	(United States) Chloe Patrick	(United States) Colleen Gulick	(United States) Cassidy Hickey
2023	(United States) Colleen Gulick	(United States) Holly Breck	(United States) Laurel Rathbun
2024	(United States) Rebecca Lang	(Mexico) Ana Hernández	(United States) Ella Brenneman
