= Belize National Road Championships =

National road cycling championships in Belize

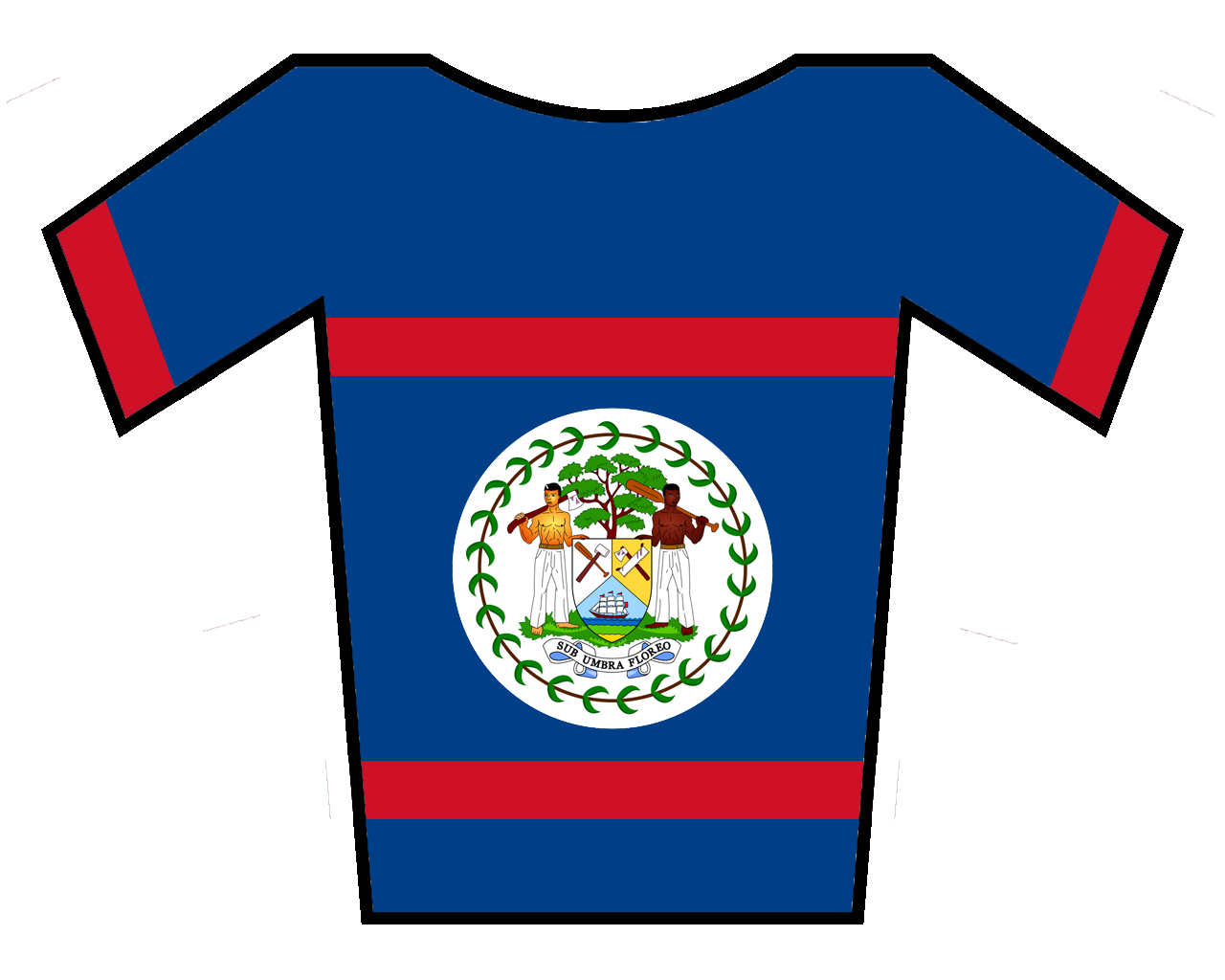

Race details
- Date: June
- Discipline: Road
- Type: One-day race

The Belize National Road Championships are held annually to decide the cycling champions in both the road race and time trial discipline, across various categories.

== Men ==
Year	Road Race	Time Trial
2003	Ariel Rosado	
2007	Michael Lewis	
2008	Gregory Lovell	
2009	Marlon Castillo	Marlon Castillo
2010	Leroy Casasola	Byron Pope
2011	Byron Pope	Byron Pope
2012	Roger Troyer	Byron Pope
2013	Byron Pope	Edgar Nissan Arana
2014	Edgar Nissan Arana	Edgar Nissan Arana
2015	Giovanni Lovell	Giovanni Lovell
2016	Giovanni Lovell	Joel Adan Borland
2017	Edgar Nissan Arana	Tarique Flowers
2018	Joslyn Chavarria	Giovanni Lovell
2019	Ron Vasquez	Oscar Quiroz
2020	Not held due to the COVID-19 pandemic in Belize	
2021	Justin Williams	Oscar Quiroz
2022	Giovanni Lovell	Oscar Quiroz
2023	Cory Williams	Oscar Quiroz

== Women ==
Year	Road Race	Time Trial
2007	Marinette Flowers	
2008	Shalini Zabaneh	
2009	Shalini Zabaneh	Shalini Zabaneh
2010	Shalini Zabaneh	Shalini Zabaneh
2011	Shalini Zabaneh	Shalini Zabaneh
2012	Shalini Zabaneh	Shalini Zabaneh
2013	Shalini Zabaneh	Shalini Zabaneh
2014	Shalini Zabaneh	Kaya Cattouse
2015	Shalini Zabaneh	Alicia Thompson
2016	Kaya Cattouse	Alicia Thompson
2017	Taralee Ordonez	Alicia Thompson
2018	Alicia Thompson	Kaya Cattouse
2019	Kaya Cattouse	Kaya Cattouse
2020	Not held due to the COVID-19 pandemic in Belize	
2021	Alicia Thompson	Nicole Gallego
2022	Kaya Cattouse	Alicia Thompson
