= Kaya Cattouse =

Belizean cyclist

Personal information
- Born: 12 December 1990 (age 35) Belize

Cycling career
- Sport: Cycling
- Current team: LA Sweat
- Discipline: Road
- Role: Rider

Amateur team
- 2022–: LA Sweat

Kaya Cattouse (born 12 December 1990) is a Belizean racing cyclist. She is a six-time national champion, winning three time trial titles and three road race titles.

== Major results ==
2014
1st Time trial, National Road Championships
2015
2nd Road race, National Road Championships
2016
1st Road race, National Road Championships
2017
National Road Championships

2nd Road race
2nd Time trial

2018
National Road Championships

1st Time trial
2nd Road race

2019
National Road Championships

1st Time trial
1st Road race

2021
National Road Championships

2nd Road race
2nd Time trial

2022
1st Road race, National Road Championships
