= Ulises Alfredo Castillo =

Mexican road cyclist

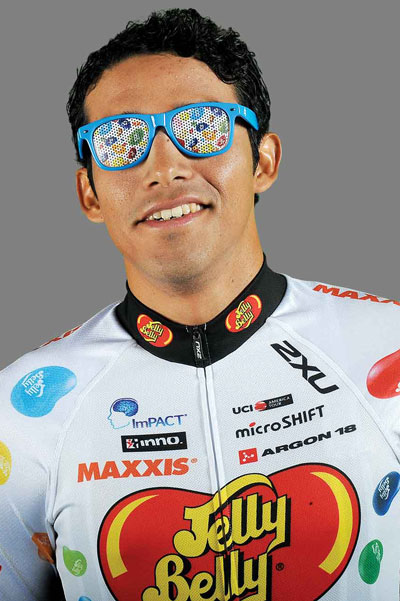

Personal information
- Full name: Ulises Alfredo Castillo Soto
- Nicknames: El Hueso; (English: The Bone)
- Born: 5 March 1992 (age 34) Los Mochis, Sinaloa, Mexico
- Weight: 72 kg (159 lb)

Cycling career
- Sport: Cycling
- Current team: Above & Beyond Cancer Cycling p/b Bike World
- Discipline: Road
- Role: Rider
- Rider type: Sprinter

Amateur team
- 2024–: Above & Beyond Cancer Cycling p/b Bike World

Professional teams
- 2014–2016: Start–Trigon Cycling Team
- 2016–2018: Jelly Belly–Maxxis
- 2019–2020: Elevate–KHS Pro Cycling
- 2021–2022: Wildlife Generation Pro Cycling
- 2023–2024: Denver Disruptors
Medal record
Men's track cycling
Representing Mexico
Central American and Caribbean Games
Silver medal – second place	2026 Santo Domingo	Team pursuit

Ulises Alfredo Castillo Soto (born 5 March 1992) is a Mexican road cyclist, who currently rides for club team Above & Beyond Cancer Cycling p/b Bike World.

== Major results ==
2014
Vuelta a Michoacán

1st Stages 1 & 5

2015
1st Overall Tour de Murrieta

1st Stage 1 (ITT)

2nd Overall Vuelta a Michoacán
2016
1st Overall Tour de Murrieta
Sea Otter Classic

1st Road race
1st Criterium

1st Stage 4 Redlands Bicycle Classic
5th Road race, Pan American Road Championships
5th Road race, National Road Championships
2017
3rd Overall Redlands Bicycle Classic
3rd Overall Grand Prix Cycliste de Saguenay
4th Road race, National Road Championships
6th Overall Tour of Xingtai
2018
2nd Road race, National Road Championships
2nd Overall Tour of Xingtai
2nd Overall San Dimas Stage Race

1st Stage 2

2019
1st Winston-Salem Cycling Classic
2nd Road race, National Road Championships
2020
National Road Championships

1st Road race
2nd Time trial

2021
2nd Overall Tour of Mevlana
5th Grand Prix Gazipaşa
8th Grand Prix Gündoğmuş
9th Grand Prix Alanya
