= Nicole Freedman =

American cyclist

Personal information
- Born: May 21, 1972 (age 54) Wellesley, Massachusetts

Cycling career
- Sport: Cycling
- Role: Rider

Nicole Freedman (born May 21, 1972) is an American Olympic cyclist.

== Early life and career ==
Freedman, who is Jewish, was born in Wellesley, Massachusetts. She attended MIT, and then Stanford University. Among the teams she has competed on are Shaklee (1997–1998), Charles Schwab (1999–2000), Credit Suisse First Boston (2001), RONA (2002), and Basis (2003–).

In 1997, she was a US National Team member. She was a member of the US cycling team at the 2000 Summer Olympics in Sydney, Australia (and competed in the 119.7 km women's road race), and won the 64-mile (103 km) US National Championship Road Race. In 2001, she won the US National Championship Criterium. In 2003, she came in second in the Israel National Championship road race.

In 2001, she was honored by the US Jewish Sports Hall of Fame.

In 2007, Freedman became head of the "Boston Bikes" initiative for the City of Boston under Mayor Thomas Menino.

On April 3, 2012, Freedman announced that she would become the executive director of Maine Huts & Trails, transitioning into the role that April and replacing David Herring as the second full-time Executive Director for the organization.

Nicole returned to the position of Director of the Boston Bikes program in January 2013.

Freedman resigned from Boston Bikes in March 2015 pending a move to Seattle, Washington.

Subsequently, she became the Chief of Active Transportation & Partnerships in the Seattle Department of Transportation per their organizational chart of July 2015 She was located in the Transit and Mobility group and worked on the Puget Sound Bike Share initiative as well as a new Summer Parkways program.

On September 12, 2016, Nicole was appointed to be Director of Transportation for the City of Newton, MA.
