= Michael Ball (fashion) =

American businessman

Michael Ball is an entrepreneur best known for founding the fashion brand, Rock & Republic and his charitable efforts with his Rock the Cure foundation and the Boys and Girls Club.

Ball was inducted to the Council of Fashion Designers of America in 2007 and received the Spirit of Life Award from City of Hope for his charity work with Rock the Cure.
