= Tyler Williams (cyclist) =

American bicycle racer (born 1994)

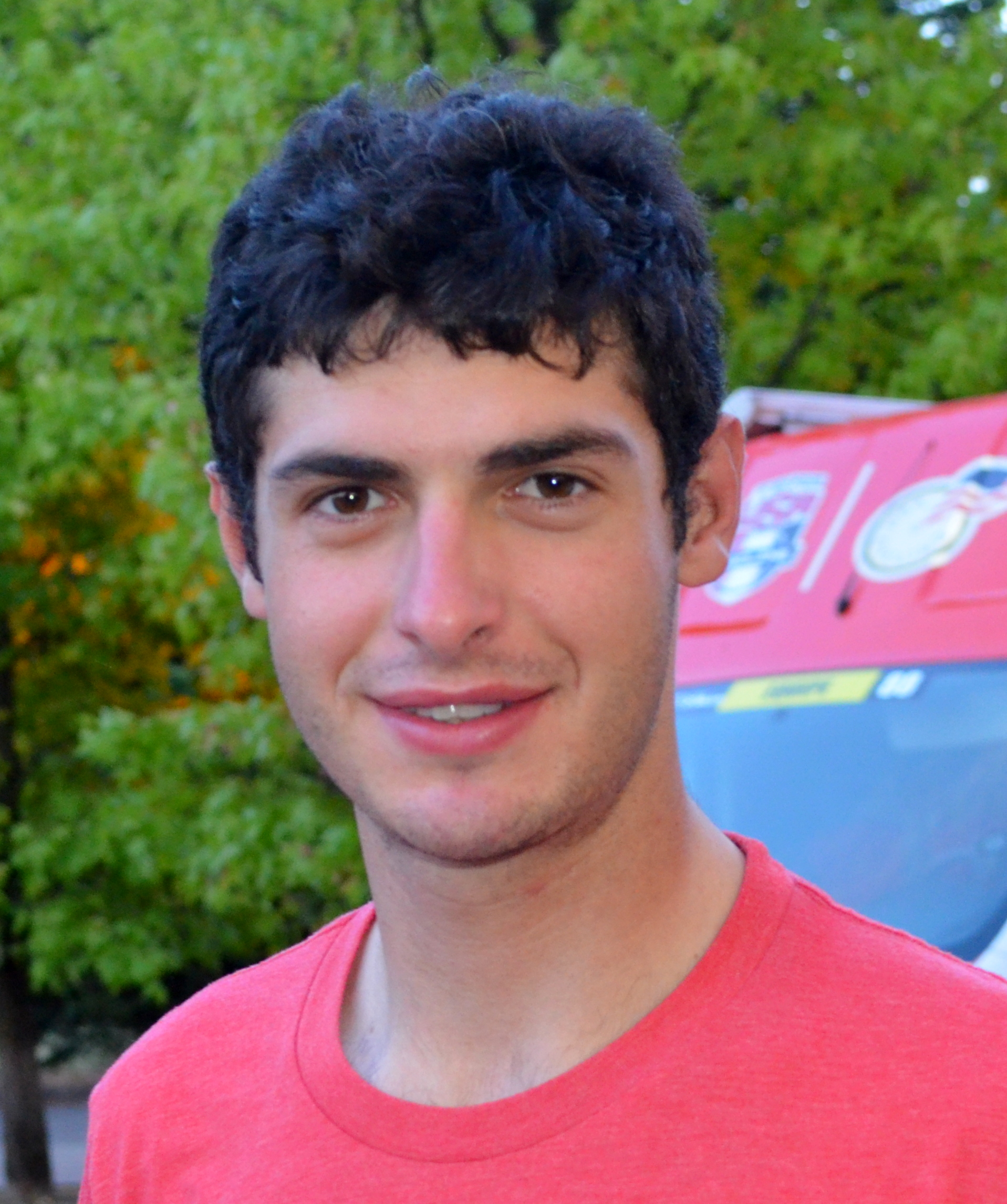
- Williams in 2015.

Personal information
- Full name: Tyler James Williams
- Born: November 17, 1994 (age 31) Bakersfield, California
- Height: 1.80 m (5 ft 11 in)
- Weight: 73 kg (161 lb)

Cycling career
- Sport: Cycling
- Current team: Golden State Blazers
- Discipline: Road
- Role: Rider

Amateur teams
- 2013–2015: BMC Development Team
- 2019–2020: Legion of Los Angeles
- 2024: Miami Nights
- 2025–: Golden State Blazers

Professional teams
- 2016: Axeon–Hagens Berman
- 2017–2018: Israel Cycling Academy
- 2021–2023: L39ION of Los Angeles

Tyler James Williams (born November 17, 1994) is an American cyclist, who currently rides for club team Golden State Blazers.

== Major results ==
2014
2nd Paris–Roubaix Espoirs
2016
1st Winters Road Race
1st Stage 1 (TTT) Olympia's Tour
1st Stage 2 Chico Stage Race
3rd Road race, National Under-23 Road Championships
2019
1st Bariani Road Race
1st Winters Road Race
1st Stage 2 Chico Stage Race
2020
2nd Overall Valley of the Sun Stage Race
2nd Overall Tour de Murrieta
2021
1st Overall Joe Martin Stage Race

1st Stage 1

1st Athens Twilight Criterium
2nd Overall Tulsa Tough

1st Stage 3

2022
1st Overall La Verne Stage Race

1st Stage 1

1st Oakland Grand Prix
1st Stage 4 Redlands Bicycle Classic
1st Grant Park Criterium
1st Chowchilla Criterium
2023
1st Stage 1 Sea Otter Classic
National Road Championships

2nd Road race
3rd Criterium

2024
1st Cherry Pie Criterium
1st Bariani Road Race
1st Santa Cruz Classic Criterium
3rd Bucks County Classic
2025
1st Mundeley GP
