= Rock Racing =

Team information
- UCI code: RRC
- Founded: 2007
- Disbanded: 2009
- Disciplines: Pro and Elite Amateur Men's Road
- Status: Continental
- Bicycles: De Rosa

Key personnel
- General manager: Michael Ball
- Team managers: Rudy Pevenage and Laurenzo LaPage

Team name history
- 2007–2009: Rock Racing

Rock Racing (UCI Code: RR) was a cycling team founded in 2007 by Michael Ball. The team is affiliated with Ball's Rock & Republic clothing line. Rock Racing received media attention for hiring outcasts in the sport, including those tainted by performance-enhancing drug scandals. The team's "bad boy image" was furthered by the design of the team kits, and its motto was "Here to stay" which may have served to incite the anti-doping efforts of the time.

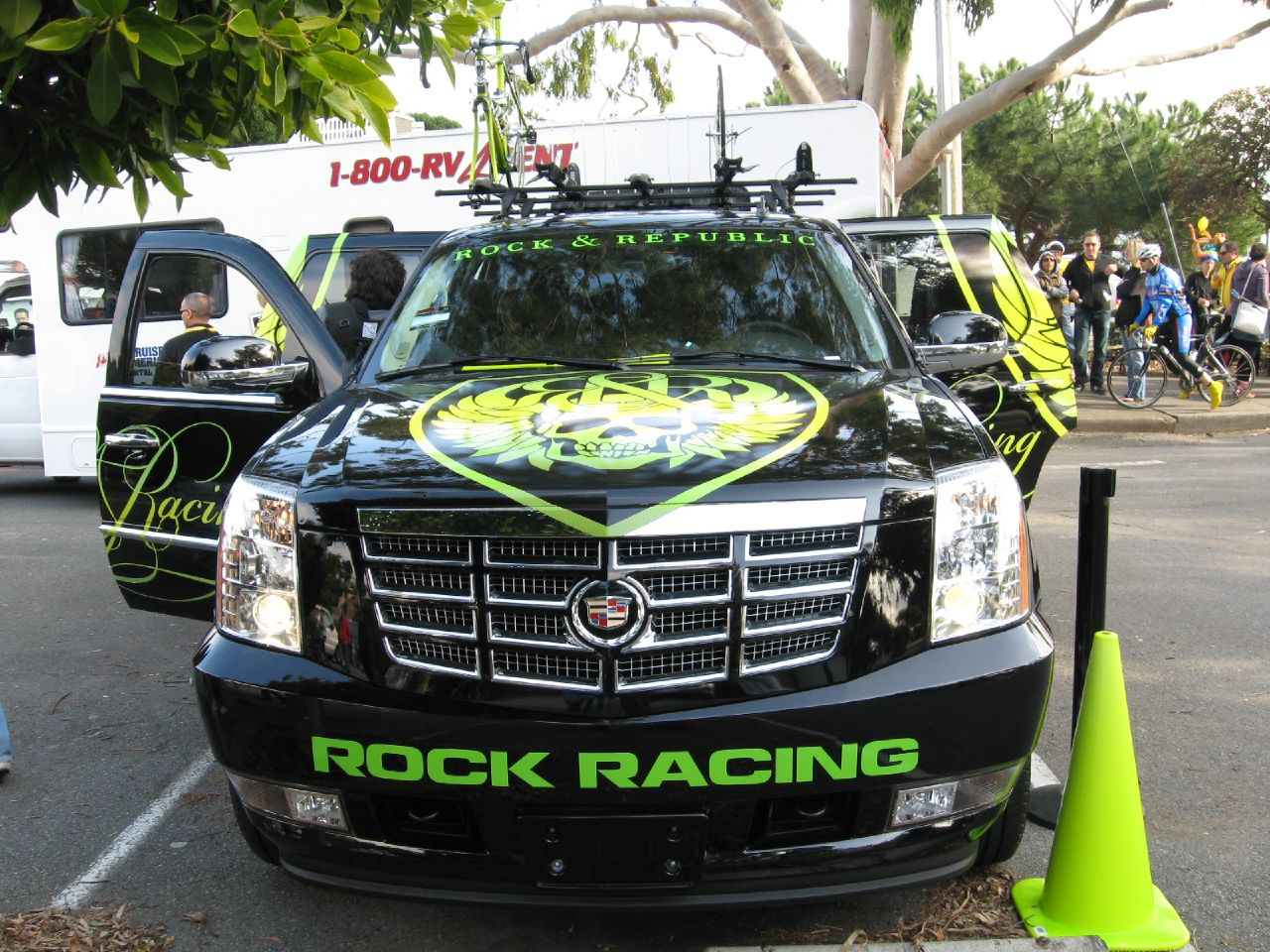

The team rides De Rosa and branded the DeRosa logo across some versions of their 2008 kits. Ball hoped his expertise in brand marketing will sell merchandise linked to the team. Other product sponsorships for 2008 included Stella Azzurra parts, LAS Helmets, and Campagnolo components. The team's support vehicles were black Cadillac SUVs.

After failing to secure a UCI Professional Continental license for 2010, the team brought in the government of the Spanish autonomous community of Murcia (who previously sponsored the now-defunct Contentpolis-Ampo) as a co-title sponsor. Although they planned to seek UCI Continental registration under a Mexican license, and signed Floyd Landis to their roster. On 3 March 2010 it was announced that Rock Racing would not be awarded a professional licence of any form and as a result would race as an amateur team in the 2010 season: Landis had a clause in his contract allowing him to leave the team in the case of their not being granted professional status.

After Floyd Landis was signed by the team he visited Ball's house wired by the FDA. The evidence found led to a search of Ball's residence.

== 2007 season ==
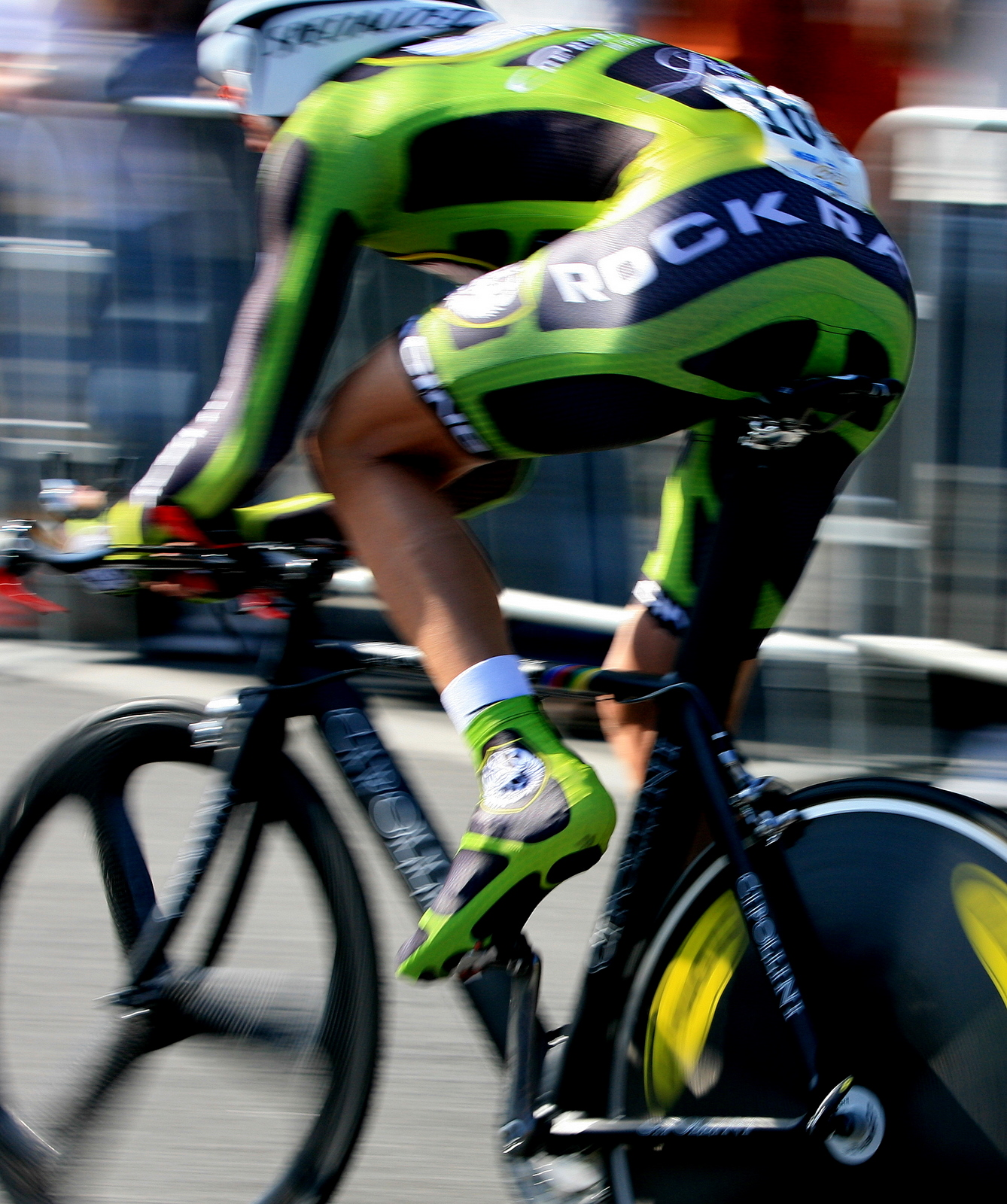
Mario Cipollini at the Tour of California

Directed by Frankie Andreu, with eleven riders with an average age of 28, the team included Rahsaan Bahati, Mariano Friedick, Kayle Leogrande, David Clinger, and Jeremiah Wiscovitch, Rock Racing scored inaugural season victories at The CSC Invitational, The Chevron Manhattan Beach Grand Prix, and Best Sprinter Competition at The Redlands Bicycle Classic. Other results include a stage win at The Valley of the Sun Stage Race, and four stage wins at Wisconsin's Superweek.

== 2008 season ==
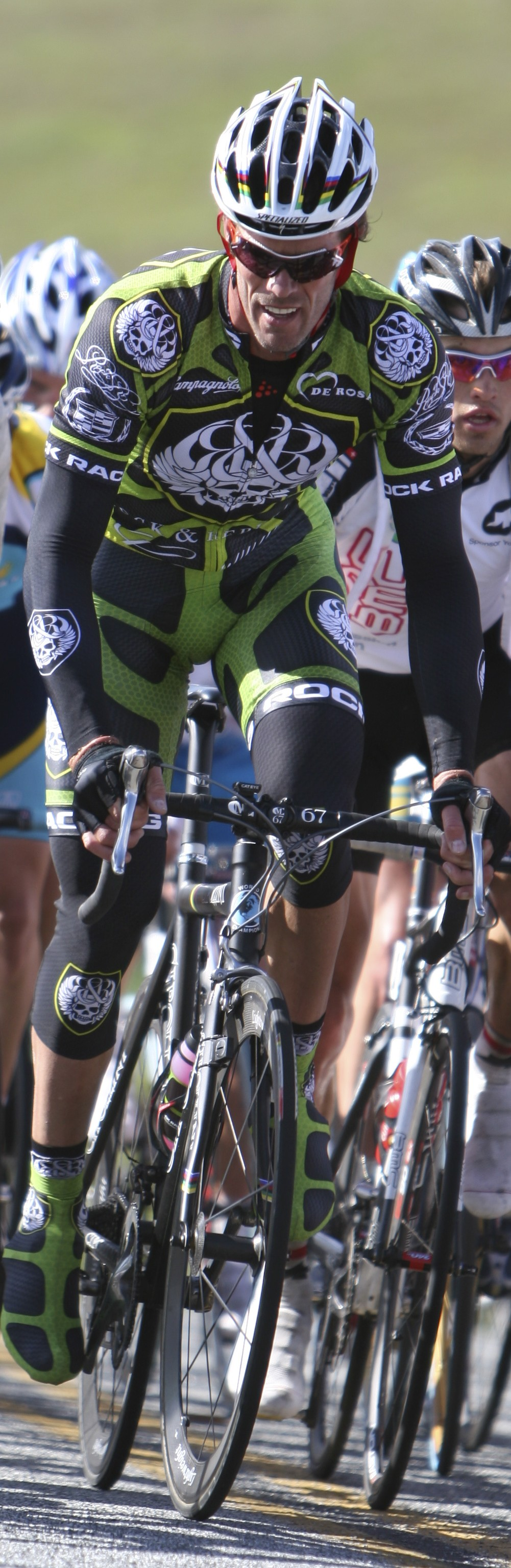
Mario Cipollini al Tour of California 2008

Directed by Mariano Friedick, and comprising 21 riders with an average age of 29, Rock Racing had to "come out of the gate swinging" being the center of a controversy before the 2008 Amgen Tour of California when newly signed racers, Santiago Botero, Tyler Hamilton and Óscar Sevilla were not allowed to start due to the race organizers' policy banning convicted abusers of performance-enhancing drugs. Rock Racing's five remaining riders finished the seven-day race and scored seven top-10 finishes, including Cipollini's third in Sacramento on Stage 2. Ball had hired Mario Cipollini in early 2008 to race and replace Andreu as Director Sportif. On the eve of Milan–San Remo, which he won in 2002 only a few months before his first retirement, he announced he was going back into retirement.

In April 2008, Rock Racing sued the Tour de Georgia regarding a berth in the race. A separate team withdrew, which opened a spot, avoiding legal action. The team scored four top-five finishes and placed Sevilla sixth overall. Also that month, an online poll by Bicycling Magazine showed that an overwhelming majority would be "rooting for" Rock Racing over other teams, some of which being the biggest in the sport.

Major victories for 2008 included a team sweep in the prologue of June's Vuelta a Colombia, on the way to a Stage 7 victory by Víctor Hugo Peña, and Stage 9 victory by Óscar Sevilla, who also won Commerce Bank Reading Classic earlier that month. Of note, Sevilla also became the first non-Colombian in 48 years to win that nation's nine-day RCN Classic in October. Tyler Hamilton won both the Tour of Qinghai Lake in July, and the USPRO Road Race Championship in September. Rahsaan Bahati's USPRO Criterium Championship victory gave the team both the Road Race and Criterium National Champions for the United States. Bahati also won other major events such as Athens Twilight Criterium, Chevron Manhattan Beach Grand Prix, the Millikan Memorial Crit, as well as two stage wins during Wisconsin's Superweek on the way to becoming the second best sprinter in that series. During Santiago Botero's final season abroad he bookended his long career, by winning Stage 1 and placing 1st on the Final GC of Redlands Bicycle Classic. In a season of "firsts" for Botero, he also won the opening day of both Cascade Cycling Classic, and his native Vuelta a Colombia, which he won overall in 2007. Notably, he also finished 7th in the Elite Men's Road Race at the Beijing Summer Olympics. Fred Rodriguez had a 3rd place, podium finish at the Philadelphia International Championship.

For the amateur squad, Sterling Magnell had a breakout year, winning the Dana Point Criterium, Pro-Am 1/2 International Challenge during Downer's Grove weekend, and two stages of Wisconsin's Superweek while on his way to finishing 2nd in the GC. Australian track standout, Pete Dawson won the Sandy Springs Cycling Challenge which is included in the USAcrits Speedweek Series. He also won two stages in Wisconsin's Superweek as well as California's Red Trolley Classic Criterium. Eighteen-year-old Justin Williams finished 1st on Stage 3 of Valley of the Sun Stage Race and won the U-23 National Criterium Championship to give the 2008 team its third National Champion. The young "fast-tracker" also finished 3rd in the Millikan Memorial Crit and 4th in the Red Trolley Crit. Another "fast-tracking" young Rock Racer for 2008 was Jeremiah Wiscovitch who finished 2nd in the Red Trolley Crit.

== 2009 season ==
The 2009 offseason was marked by more significant changes. The team once again redesigned its kit and switched its bike to Kestrel's new RT800, 950 gram carbon frameset. Mr. Ball brought in notorious Director Sportif, Rudy Pevenage along with former Astana Director Laurenzo LaPage. Mr. Ball, in tandem with this move, incorporated Scott Analytics, to manage its anti-doping program. The company's president and founder, Paul Scott, is also the man behind previous anti-doping programs for Garmin–Chipotle, Team Columbia–High Road, and BMC Racing Team. New riders for 2009 included Francisco Mancebo, José Enrique Gutiérrez, Glen Chadwick, Chris Baldwin, David Vitoria, Caleb Manion, and Iván Domínguez. Dominguez later wound up signing elsewhere, only to eventually sign with Rock Racing in June. Conversely, Chris Baldwin signed with Rock Racing, eventually being released mid-season. 2003 Tour de France Points Classification Winner, Baden Cooke, also reported to have reached a verbal commitment, eventually signed with Vacansoleil of the Netherlands for 2009 during a period of uncertainty and scrutiny for Rock Racing. .

In May, Michael Creed, Caesar Grajales and Chris Baldwin were released from the team due to a lack in performance. Grajales would rejoin the team and start Vuelta a Colombia. Creed and Baldwin joined Team Type 1, and OUCH Maxxis, respectively. Earlier in March, rider Tyler Hamilton tested positive for a banned substance. The doping scandal resulted in an eight-year ban and subsequent retirement from professional cycling. In June the team signed renowned Cuban sprinter, Iván Domínguez who had previously been with the UCI Pro Tour squad, Fuji–Servetto. In conjunction with this move, Rahsaan Bahati was promoted back onto the Rock Racing pro squad in order to defend his 2008 US National Criterium Champion title during the US National Criterium Championships, as well as lend support to Dominguez. Bahati was controversially demoted to the amateur squad early in 2009 due to complications in the UCI language regarding roster size. That issue, among others contributed to the teams' rejection by the UCI in its application to become a Professional Continental Team for 2009. In addition to having too many riders on its pro squad, (17), the majority of Rock Racing is age 32, or older. UCI Continental Squads are required to maintain a majority of riders under the age of 28. Even further problems to the organizations professional objectives were the purported monthly salary and logistical financing delays. UCI Professional Continental Teams have a minimum annual gross salary of 27,500 euros (roughly 39,000.00), and 23,000 euros (roughly 34,000.00) for "neo-pro" (new pro) riders in the Professional Continental ranks. Despite the aforementioned roadblocks, the Continental squad as it stands has had numerous top results in 2009. The "Spanish realm" has been the teams stomping ground this season and so it could be viewed that if the team obtains UCI Pro Continental license in 2010 there is the potential for future invitations to races such as the Vuelta a España, one of the sports three Grand Tours.

Results for 2009 include "Paco" Mancebo's stage 1 victory in the Amgen Tour of California as well as his Final Overall GC victory in Spain's Vuelta a Asturias in which he, Sevilla, and Chadwick also each won a stage. David Vitoria scored back-to-back wins in March's Vuelta Mexico Telmex on his way to his third place podium finish in the Final Overall GC. In addition, he also won the Overall Mountains Classification. Vitoria, along with the defending champion Glen Chadwick's fifth place overall, led the team to the Final Overall Team Classification at the Mexican national tour. At June's Vuelta a Colombia, Víctor Hugo Peña and Glen Chadwick each won a stage, while Óscar Sevilla was on his way to taking home the Overall Points Classification for the event. Other top finishes include David Vitoria finishing fifth in the Commerce Bank Philadelphia International Championship, as well as Óscar Sevilla finishing fourth in a bunch sprint among his notable countrymen Ángel Vicioso and David Arroyo at Spain's Vuelta a Rioja.

== Charitable outreach ==
Rock Racing sponsored numerous races in 2008, including the Amgen Tour of California, the Tour de Georgia, United States National Road Race Championships in Greenville, South Carolina, the Commerce Bank Triple Crown of Cycling which includes the Philadelphia International Championship, the 35th annual Skyscraper Harlem Cycling Classic, and the Chevron Manhattan Beach Grand Prix.

The team also supported several charities. At the Tour of California, Rock The Cure donated $10,000 to a pair of after-school programs. At the Tour de Georgia, $250,000 was donated to the beneficiaries of the event, Aflac Cancer Center and Blood Disorders Service of Children's Healthcare of Atlanta and the Georgia Cancer Coalition.

In an unprecedented move, Rock Racing announced on 6/3/2008, the creation of the "Professional Cycling Catastrophic Injury Fund", a charitable entity to raise money for professional and elite amateur cyclists who suffer a catastrophic injury as a result of their participation in the competitive sport of cycling. "Rock Racing will make the initial contribution with a significant donation and will continue the fund's growth through direct monetary contributions as well as a percentage of its own sales. Ten percent of all Rock Racing on-line sales will benefit the fund as will 100 percent of proceeds from special Fund-branded products to be introduced later this year. The goal is to raise $20 million over the next two years."

== 2009 team roster ==
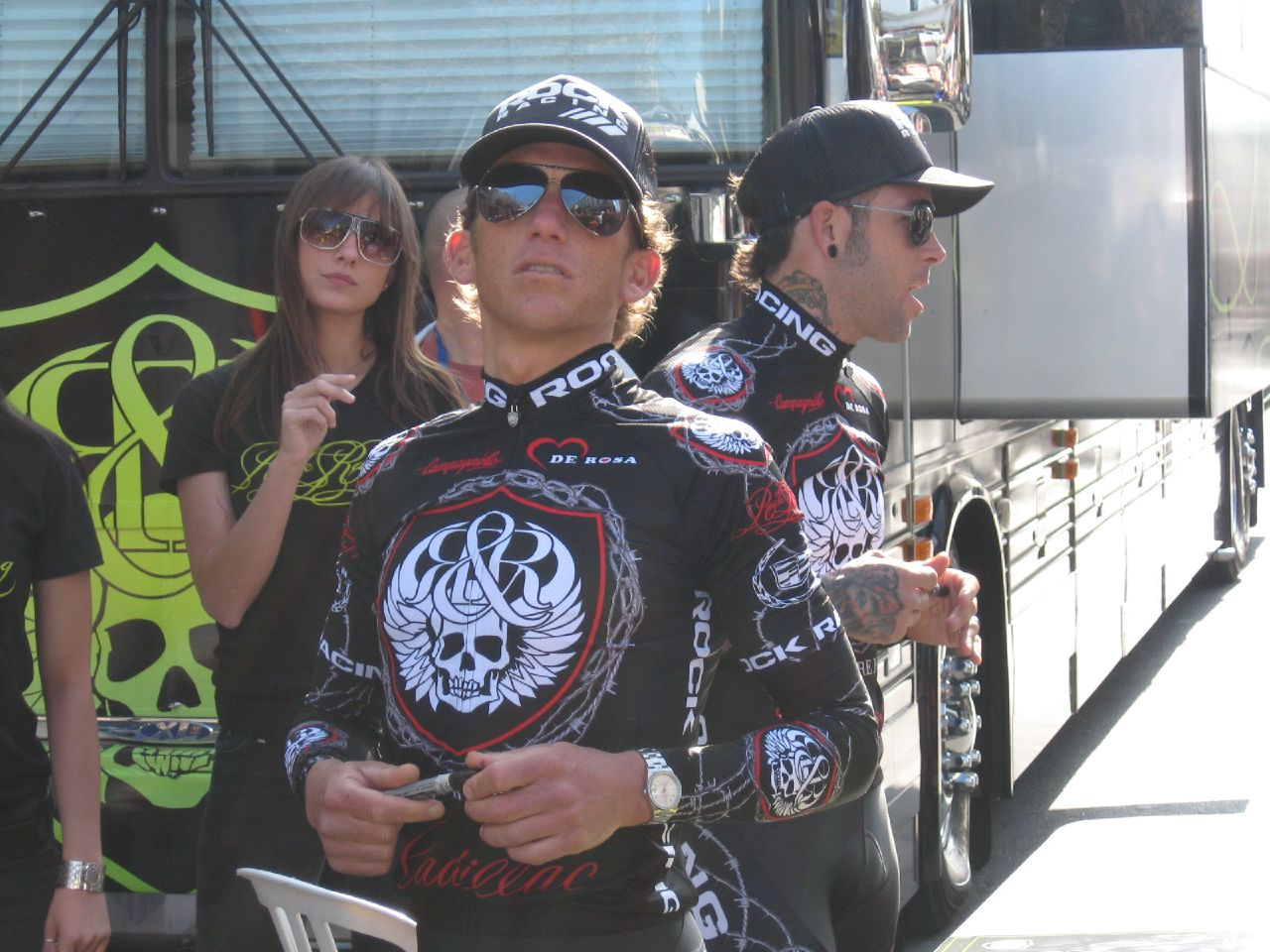
Tyler Hamilton at the Tour of California 2008

Rider	Date of birth
Rahsaan Bahati (USA)	February 13, 1982 (aged 27)
Christopher Baldwin (USA)	October 15, 1975 (aged 34)
Alexander Boyd (USA)	May 21, 1987 (aged 22)
Glen Chadwick (NZL)	October 17, 1976 (aged 33)
Iván Domínguez (USA)	May 28, 1976 (aged 33)
James Driscoll (USA)	June 15, 1987 (aged 22)
José Enrique Gutiérrez (ESP)	June 18, 1974 (aged 35)
Tyler Hamilton (USA)	March 1, 1971 (aged 38)
Sergio Hernandez (USA)	January 8, 1985 (aged 24)
Aaron Kemps (AUS)	September 10, 1983 (aged 26)

Rider	Date of birth
Francisco Mancebo (ESP)	March 9, 1976 (aged 33)
David Martín Velasco (ESP)	November 8, 1983 (aged 26)
Víctor Hugo Peña (COL)	July 10, 1974 (aged 35)
Fred Rodriguez (USA)	September 3, 1973 (aged 36)
Nicholas Sanderson (AUS)	May 27, 1984 (aged 25)
Óscar Sevilla (ESP)	September 29, 1976 (aged 33)
David Tanner (AUS)	September 30, 1984 (aged 25)
David Vitoria (SUI)	October 15, 1984 (aged 25)
Justin Williams (BLZ)	May 26, 1989 (aged 20)
