= San Dimas Stage Race =

American multi-day road cycling race

Race details
- Date: March
- Region: San Gabriel Mountains, California
- Discipline: Road
- Type: Stage race

History
- First edition: 2000
- Editions: 20 (2019)
- First winner: Jamie Paolinetti (USA); Amber Neben (USA)
- Most recent: James Piccoli (CAN); Holly Breck (USA)

The San Dimas Stage Race is a stage cycling race held annually in the San Gabriel Mountains in Southern California. It was called the Pomona Valley Stage Race until 2004.

== Winners ==
=== Men ===
Year	Winner	Second	Third
Pomona Valley Stage Race
2000	(United States) Jamie Paolinetti		
2001	(United States) Chris Walker		
2002	(Australia) Hilton Clarke		
2003	(United States) Tom Danielson	(United States) Christopher Horner	(United States) Jonathan Vaughters
2004	(United States) Christopher Horner	(Canada) Eric Wohlberg	(United States) Chris Wherry
San Dimas Stage Race
2005	(United States) Scott Moninger	(Canada) Gordon Fraser	(Australia) Karl Menzies
2006	(New Zealand) Heath Blackgrove	(United States) Chris Baldwin	(Australia) Trent Wilson
2007	(United States) Scott Moninger	(United States) Philip Zajicek	(United States) Matt Cook
2008	(Canada) Cameron Evans	(Spain) Óscar Sevilla	(Australia) Benjamin Day
2009	(Australia) Benjamin Day	(United States) Phillip Gaimon	(United States) Chris Baldwin
2010	(Australia) Benjamin Day	(Australia) Sid Taberlay	(United States) Paul Mach
2011	(Australia) Benjamin Day	(United States) Matt Cook	(United States) Tyler Wren
2012	(United States) Andy Jacques-Maynes	(United States) Joseph Schmalz	(Canada) Rob Britton
2013	(Colombia) Janier Acevedo	(United States) Matt Cooke	(United States) Carter Jones
2014	(France) Clément Chevrier	(United States) Coulton Hartrich	(United States) Daniel Eaton
2015	(United States) Emerson Oronte	(Costa Rica) Gregory Brenes	(United States) Timothy Rugg
2016	(Colombia) Janier Acevedo	(United States) Brandon McNulty	(United States) Neilson Powless
2017	(United States) Connor Brown	(Canada) Jordan Cheyne	(United States) Robin Carpenter
2018	(United States) Cory Lockwood	(United States) Thomas Revard	(Canada) Jordan Cheyne
2019	(Canada) James Piccoli	(Mexico) Ulises Castillo	(United States) Sam Boardman

=== Women ===
Year	Winner	Second	Third
2000	(United States) Amber Neben		
2001	(United States) Carla Koehler	(United States) Riley McAlpine	(United States) Tamara Williamson
2002	(Canada) Christine Thorburn	(United States) Kristin Armstrong	(United States) Jennifer Stevens
2003	(Canada) Geneviève Jeanson	(United States) Amber Neben	(Canada) Sue Palmer-Komar
2004	(Canada) Lyne Bessette	(Canada) Sue Palmer-Komar	(United States) Kristin Armstrong
2005	(Canada) Erinne Willock	(United States) Kristin Armstrong	(United States) Kimberly Bruckner Baldwin
2006	(United States) Kristin Armstrong	(United States) Kimberly Bruckner Baldwin	(United States) Alisha Lion
2007	(United States) Meredith Miller	(United States) Lauren Tamayo	(United States) Kori Kelley-Seehafer
2008	(United States) Kimberley Anderson	(Australia) Alexis Rhodes	(United States) Mara Abbott
2009	(Germany) Ina-Yoko Teutenberg	(United States) Mara Abbott	(New Zealand) Catherine Cheatley
2010	(Germany) Ina-Yoko Teutenberg	(United States) Mara Abbott	(United States) Evelyn Stevens
2011	(United States) Amber Neben	(United States) Amanda Miller	(Canada) Heather Logan-Sprenger
2012	(United States) Kristin Armstrong	(Canada) Clara Hughes	(Canada) Joëlle Numainville
2013	(United States) Mara Abbott	(United States) Amber Neben	(United States) Brianna Walle
2014	(Canada) Karol-Ann Canuel	(United States) Tayler Wiles	(United States) Amber Neben
2015	(United States) Amber Neben	(United States) Brianna Walle	(United States) Allie Dragoo
2016	(United States) Kristin Armstrong	(United States) Kathryn Donovan	(United States) Jessica Cutler
2017	(United States) Kristabel Doebel-Hickok	(Mexico) Marcela Prieto	(Mexico) Verónica Leal
2018	(Canada) Jasmin Duehring	(Canada) Emily Marcolini	(United States) Kristabel Doebel-Hickok
2019	(United States) Holly Breck	(United Kingdom) Emma Grant	(United States) Emily Georgeson
