= Suzanne Sonye =

American cyclist

Personal information
- Born: December 28, 1968 (age 56)
- Height: 5 ft 2 in (157 cm)
- Weight: 115 lb (52 kg)

Sport
- Country: United States
- Sport: Cycling
- Team: Saturn Cycling Team (2000-2002)
- Updated on 30 May 2017

Suzanne Sonye is an American professional road racing cyclist. She was a member of the Saturn Cycling Team from 2000 to 2002. In 2007, while Sonye was working as a soigneur for Rock Racing, cyclist Kayle Leogrande told her that he was concerned about being caught for doping. She subsequently turned Leogrande in to the United States Anti-Doping Agency, which eventually gave him a two-year suspension.

Sonye was born in Lynwood, California.

== Results ==
Year	Competition	Team	Position
2004	USCF/USPRO Criterium Championships	Helens/Trek/VW	15/77
2005	Masters, Elite SCNCA Road Race Championships	Helens/Trek/VW	2/16
2010	Golden Empire Classic & SCNCA RR Championships	N/A	2/11
2011	GEC/District Road Race Championships	Helens/Cannondale	3/17
