= Holly Breck =

American cyclist

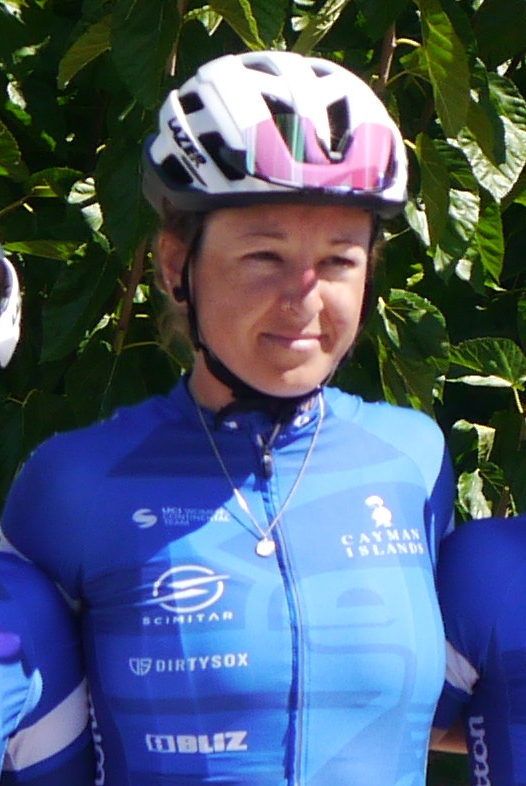
- Holly Breck (2022)

Personal information
- Full name: Holly Marie Breck
- Born: May 27, 1992 (age 34) Santa Barbara, California, U.S.
- Height: 5 ft 7 in (170 cm)
- Weight: 130 lb (59 kg)

Cycling career
- Sport: Cycling
- Current team: Torelli
- Discipline: Road
- Role: Rider

Amateur teams
- 2011: Platinum Performance Cycling Team
- 2012–2013: SC Velo/Empower Coaching
- 2014–2015: Incycle Racing p/b Full Circle
- 2019–2020: Go Fast–Incycle
- 2019: Fearless Femme Racing (guest)
- 2025–: Torelli

Professional teams
- 2016–2017: Twenty16–Ridebiker
- 2018: Cylance Pro Cycling
- 2021: Rally Cycling
- 2022: Torelli–Cayman Islands–Scimitar
- 2023–2024: DNA Pro Cycling

Holly Marie Breck (born May 27, 1992) is an American professional racing cyclist, who currently rides for amateur team Torelli.

== See also ==
- List of 2016 UCI Women's Teams and riders
