= Elevate–Webiplex Pro Cycling =

American cycling team

Team information
- UCI code: ELV
- Registered: United States
- Founded: 2011
- Discipline: Road
- Status: National (2011–2015); UCI Continental (2016–present)
- Bicycles: KHS Team Flight

Key personnel
- General manager: John McAllister
- Team managers: Paul Abrahams; Heath Blackgrove

Team name history
- 2011–2015 2016 2017–2019 2020–: Elevate Cycling; Elevate Pro Cycling; Elevate–KHS Pro Cycling; Elevate–Webiplex Pro Cycling

Elevate–Webiplex Pro Cycling is a professional men's cycling team based in the United States. The team started competing in 2011 as an amateur team, starting competition in elite road bicycle racing events under UCI Continental rules in 2016.

== Team roster ==
As of February 7, 2021.

Rider	Date of birth
Sam Bassetti (USA)	April 2, 1991 (age 35)
Jordan Cheyne (CAN)	October 2, 1991 (age 34)
Tyrel Fuchs (USA)	June 16, 1999 (age 27)
Gavin Hoover (USA)	July 12, 1997 (age 29)
Eddy Huntsman (USA)	May 16, 2002 (age 24)

Rider	Date of birth
Eli Husted (USA)	May 5, 2002 (age 24)
Adam Roberge (CAN)	March 27, 1997 (age 29)
José Alfredo Rodríguez (MEX)	May 19, 1997 (age 29)
Fabrizio Von Nacher (MEX)	July 28, 1993 (age 33)
Eric Young (USA)	February 26, 1989 (age 37)

== Major results ==
2018
Stage 4 Joe Martin Stage Race, José Alfredo Rodríguez
Winston-Salem Cycling Classic, Sam Bassetti
Overall Tour de Beauce, James Piccoli

Stage 4, James Piccoli

2019
Stage 4 Tour de Taiwan, James Piccoli
Overall Tour of the Gila, James Piccoli

Stage 1, James Piccoli
Stage 4, Eric Young

Winston Salem Cycling Classic, Ulises Alfredo Castillo
Stage 2 Tour de Beauce, James Piccoli
White Spot / Delta Road Race, Sam Bassetti
Prologue Tour of Utah, James Piccoli

2020
Stages 1, 4 & 5 Tour de Taiwan, Eric Young

Points classification, Eric Young
