= USA Cycling =

Governing body for bicycle racing in United States

- Sport: Cycle racing
- Founded: 1920
- Affiliation: UCI
- Regional affiliation: COPACI
- Headquarters: Colorado Springs, Colorado, U.S.
- Chairman: Matt Barger

Official website
- www.usacycling.org
- (United States)

USA Cycling or USAC, based in Colorado Springs, Colorado, is the national governing body for bicycle racing in the United States. It covers the disciplines of road, track, mountain bike, cyclo-cross, and BMX across all ages and ability levels. In 2015, USAC had a membership of 61,631 individual members.

USA Cycling is associated with the UCI or, Union Cycliste Internationale, which governs international cycling, and the United States Olympic Committee (USOC). The organization is also a member of the continental body Confederacion Panamericana de Ciclismo (COPACI). USA Cycling also organizes the USA Cycling Pro Road Tour, the top road cycling series for men and women in the United States.

== History ==
The Amateur Bicycle League of America was organized in 1920 and incorporated in New York in 1921. In 1975, the name was changed to the United States Cycling Federation. In 1995, USA Cycling, Inc. was incorporated in Colorado, and in 1995, the two corporations merged, with USA Cycling serving as the umbrella corporation. The National Off Road Bicycle Association, once an independent governing body of mountain bike racing in the US, is now the mountain bike racing division of USA Cycling (USAC).

The office of USA Cycling, Inc. remained on the United States Olympic Training Center campus near downtown Colorado Springs until March 2009. The national governing body was able to secure office space on the city's north side. USA Cycling's headquarters now consists of a 26,000-square-foot building on nearly two acres of land near I-25 on the northwest side of Colorado Springs.

In September 2023, the U.S. Center for SafeSport permanently banned Kevin ‘Scott’ Morris, a former contractor and director for the USA CRITS series, from participation in activities and competitions with USA Cycling for “criminal disposition - involving a minor” and “criminal disposition - sexual misconduct”.

== Organization ==
USA Cycling is the official governing body for all disciplines of competitive cycling in the United States, including road, track, mountain bike, BMX, and cyclo-cross. The organization has a two-part mission: To achieve sustained success in international cycling competition and to grow competitive cycling in America.

The mountain bike racing division of USA Cycling was formerly known as NORBA, the National Off Road Bicycle Association.

As a membership-based organization, USA Cycling comprises 2,700 clubs and teams as of 2013; and nearly 70,000 licensees which include officials, coaches, mechanics, and competitive cyclists of all ages and abilities across all five disciplines of the sport.

=== Local associations ===
In an effort to grow the sport domestically, USA Cycling supports grass-roots initiatives through its 31 local associations (LA). Each year, USA Cycling reinvests much of its membership dollars back into these local programs, having distributed over $3.8 million since 2003.

=== Local and national events ===
Each year, USA Cycling sanctions over 2,900 events across the U.S. Additionally, the organization administers eight national-level calendars and manages 18 national championship events for all ages and skill levels in several disciplines: road, track, mountain bike, cyclo-cross, BMX and para-cycling.

=== A decade of growth ===
USA Cycling has seen steady growth over the last decade as participation in cycling has continued to grow across the nation and within the organization. The organization's 69,771 licensees in 2010 represent a 63% increase from the 42,724 licensees in 2002. In 2013, the number of licenses grew to over 75,000.

USA Cycling maintains development programs for men and women in all disciplines of competitive cycling, providing a structured pathway to the top tier of the sport. In 2010, over a hundred individual riders took part in USA Cycling's National Development Program, gaining valuable race experience through 2,600 fully supported race days.

=== Regional and national development camps ===
Serving as entry points into USA Cycling's National Development Program pathway, the Regional and National Development Camps aim to identify talent and, in some cases, name riders to USA Cycling rosters for major international competitions.

=== International race camps ===
USA Cycling takes dozens of juniors on international racing trips each year. These riders gain race experience at the world's top junior events, including Junior Paris-Roubaix and the Tour de L’Abitibi, where major wins were made in 2013.

=== European resident programs ===
Nearly 200 American cyclists live and train out of USA Cycling's houses in Belgium, Italy, and Germany each season. This allows them to be immersed in European race culture—considered beneficial to reaching the top tier of professional cycling.

=== Racing levels ===
USA Cycling racing levels are called categories, sometimes referred to as "cats". The lowest category for road, track, and cyclocross racing is 5 for men and women. The lowest category for mountain bike racing is 3 for both genders. Decreasing categories represent higher ability levels with category 1 being the immediate step below professional level.

=== Advancement ===
Advancement to higher categories is based on experience, as shown below.

CATEGORY	ADVANCEMENT
Road	Upgrading from category 5 to 4 can be done after finishing ten mass start races. Category 4 to 3 can be requested when a certain number of points are earned in races within a 12-month period or race experience, 25 qualifying races with a minimum of 10 top ten finishes with fields of 30 riders or more. 30 points in a 12-month period is an automatic upgrade to category 3. Upgrades from 3 to 2 and 2 to 1 are based on a number of points in a 12-month period. Category 3 to 2 requires 25 points to be eligible and 40 points for an automatic upgrade.
Cyclo-cross	Upgrading in cyclo-cross follows the same upgrade pattern as road but with different points requirements. In this case it is 10 points in a 12-month period to upgrade from category 3 to 2 and 20 points from category 2 to 1.
Track	Upgrading from track category 5 to 4 is done by taking a velodrome safety course or 4 race days, and as with road, is done by points with the added requirement of 5 race days.
Mountain bike	Riders may upgrade to category 2 as fast as they want. After 5 top-5 finishes as a category 3 rider, a rider must upgrade to category 2. After 2 top-5 category 2 finishes, a rider may upgrade to category 1, and after 5 top-5 finishes a rider must upgrade to category 1.

== See also ==
- National Collegiate Cycling Association
- United States men's national cycling team
- United States records in track cycling
