= Rahsaan Bahati =

Racing cyclist

Personal information
- Full name: Rahsaan Bahati
- Born: February 13, 1982 (age 44) Lynwood, California, United States

Cycling career
- Sport: Cycling
- Current team: Time Factory Team P/B Velo Pasadena
- Discipline: Road
- Role: Rider
- Rider type: Sprint

Professional teams
- 2007–2009: Rock Racing
- 2010: Bahati Foundation
- 2011: SKLZ-Pista Palace

Major wins
- 2008 United States National Criterium Champion

Rahsaan Bahati (born February 13, 1982 in Lynwood, California) is an American racing cyclist who currently rides for his own cycling team, Bahati Foundation Elite Team. He previously raced for the SKLZ-Pista Palace cycling team. Formerly, he rode for and managed the Bahati Foundation Pro Cycling team. He specializes in criterium racing and track cycling. In 2000 he won the amateur USCF National Criterium Championships and in 2008 he won the elite USPRO National Criterium Championships. It was reported that in 2010, Rahsaan will be the subject of a new television series entitled Bahati:Out of Compton that details his mentoring of six champion cyclists that share his inner-city Los Angeles roots.

Bahati attended Indiana University where he majored in computer animation and telecommunications.

== Major results ==
2000
1st Junior National Criterium Championships
1st Junior National Road Championships
1st USCF National Criterium Championships (amateur)

2002
1st Collegiate Points Race National Championships
1st 2002 International Pursuit

2005
1st Barrio Logan GP
2nd Garrett Lemire Memorial Grand Prix
2nd Ontario Mid Season Criterium

2006
1st MLK Criterium
1st Wings Memorial Day Criterium
1st Dominguez Hills 100k Criterium
1st Warner Center Criterium
1st Ontario Criterium, Race 1
1st Barry Wolfe Track Race
1st Stage 4, Tour of the Gila

2007
1st CSC Invitational
1st Chevron Manhattan Beach Grand Prix
1st Stage 3, Valley of the Sun Stage Race
2nd U.S. National 40 Km Madison Championships
2nd Stage 3, Tri-peaks Challenge
2nd Walterboro Cycling Classic

2008
1st United States National Criterium Championships
1st Athens Twilight Criterium
1st Chevron Manhattan Beach Grand Prix
1st Cross Roads Classic Statesville Criterium
1st Stage 2, International Cycling Classic-Superweek
1st Stage 5, International Cycling Classic-Superweek
1st Paramount Criterium
1st Ontario Criterium, Race 1
1st Roger Millikan Memorial Criterium
2nd Best Sprinter Competition International Cycling Classic-Superweek
2nd Ontario Criterium, Race 2
2nd Skyscraper Harlem Cycling Classic
2nd Stage 2, Tour de Murrieta

2009
1st Dana Point GP
1st Chevron Manhattan Beach Grand Prix
1st Davis Criterium
1st San Luis Obispo Criterium

2010
1st Redlands Bicycle Classic Criterium
2nd Downtown Long Beach Criterium
1st Tour of America's Dairyland Criterium, Race 3
1st Tour of America's Dairyland Criterium, Race 6

2011

3rd Sunny King Criterium
1st Red Trolley Criterium
1st Tour de Murrieta Criterium
2nd San Rafael Twilight Criterium

2012

1st Tour of Americas Dairyland Criterium
5th Glencoe Grand Prix Criterium NCC
2nd Barry Wolfe Grand Prix Criterium
3rd Tour de Murrieta | CCR

2013

1st Carlsbad Grand Prix Criterrium
1st THF Realty Gateway Cup Criterium
2nd THF Realty Gateway Cup Criterium
2nd THF Realty Gateway Cup Criterium
1st THF Realty Gateway Cup Criterium
4th USA Cycling Elite Mass Start Track Nationals
5th Alexian Brothers Tour of Elk Grove
4th 2013 USA Cycling Amateur Criterium
4th Tour of Americas Dairyland Criterium
2nd Tour of Americas Dairyland Criterium
5th Tour of Americas Dairyland Criterium Ncc Stage
1st LA Circuit Race Road Race
3rd Old Pueblo Grand Prix Criterium Ncc 2
1st 3rd Annual NOW Energy Bar Criterium
3rd 2013 Roger Millikan Memorial Criterium
