= 2016 Vuelta a Costa Rica =

2017 UCI America Tour

Race details
- Dates: December 13–25, 2016
- Stages: 12
- Winning time: 42h 09' 11"

Results
	Winner	César Rojas (CRC)
	Second	Juan Carlos Rojas Villegas (CRC)
	Third	Román Villalobos (CRC)
	Points	Román Villalobos (CRC)
	Mountains	Román Villalobos (CRC)
	Youth	Leandro Varela (CRC)
	Sprints	José Vega (CRC)
	Team	Frijoles Los Tierniticos–Arroz Halcón

The 2016 Vuelta a Costa Rica, the 52nd edition of the Vuelta a Costa Rica, was held from December 13 to 25 December 25, 2016.

== Route ==
Stage characteristics and winners
Stage	Date	Course	Distance	Type	Stage winner
1	December 13	Alajuela to Nicoya	190 km (120 mi)	Flat stage	Daniel Jara (CRC)
2	December 14	Nicoya to Cañas District	176 km (109 mi)	Flat stage	Efrén Santos (MEX)
3	December 15	Cañas District to Quesada	193 km (120 mi)	Hilly stage	César Rojas (CRC)
4	December 16	Quesada to Guápiles	114.8 km (71.3 mi)	Medium mountain stage	Bryan Salas (CRC)
5	December 17	Guápiles to Tucurrique District	131.2 km (81.5 mi)	Hilly stage	Román Villalobos (CRC)
6	December 18	Orosí to Paraíso	19.6 km (12.2 mi)	Individual time trial	Román Villalobos (CRC)
	December 19	Rest day			
7	December 20	Alajuela to Grecia	176.2 km (109.5 mi)	Medium mountain stage	Juan Carlos Rojas Villegas (CRC)
8	December 21	San José to San Isidro de El General	126.8 km (78.8 mi)	Mountain stage	Elías Vega (CRC)
9	December 22	Dominical to Golfito	145 km (90 mi)	Flat stage	Víctor García (ESP)
10	December 23	San Isidro de El General	175 km (109 mi)	Mountain stage	Carlos Becerra (COL)
11	December 24	Rivas District to Cot District	123 km (76 mi)	Mountain stage	Juan Carlos Rojas Villegas (CRC)
12	December 25	Heredia to Heredia	99.5 km (61.8 mi)	Flat stage	Jonathan Caicedo (ECU)

== Classifications ==
Final general classification

Rank	Rider	Team	Time
1	César Rojas (CRC)	Frijoles Los Tierniticos–Arroz Halcón	42h 09' 11"
2	Juan Carlos Rojas (CRC)	Frijoles Los Tierniticos–Arroz Halcón	+ 37"
3	Román Villalobos (CRC)	Canel's–Specialized	+ 5' 11"
4	Joseph Chavarría (CRC)	Nestlé–Giant	+ 11' 02"
5	Leandro Varela (CRC)	Frijoles Los Tierniticos–Arroz Halcón	+ 15' 49"
6	Vladimir Fernández (CRC)	Scott–TeleUno–BCT	+ 16' 28"
7	Víctor García (ESP)	Canel's–Specialized	+ 20' 19"
8	Bryan Salas (CRC)	Scott–TeleUno–BCT	+ 21' 42"
9	Nicolás Paredes (COL)	Strongman–Campagnolo–Wilier	+ 22' 23"
10	José Varela (CRC)	Canet–Múltiples Corella	+ 25' 49"
