= 2017 UCI America Tour =

- Thirteenth edition of the UCI America Tour

Details
- Dates: October 24, 2016–October 15, 2017
- Location: North America and South America
- Races: 25

The 2017 UCI America Tour was the thirteenth season of the UCI America Tour. The season began on October 24, 2016 with the Vuelta a Guatemala and ended on October 15, 2017.

The points leader, based on the cumulative results of previous races, wears the UCI America Tour cycling jersey. Throughout the season, points are awarded to the top finishers of stages within stage races and the final general classification standings of each of the stages races and one-day events. The quality and complexity of a race also determines how many points are awarded to the top finishers, the higher the UCI rating of a race, the more points are awarded.

The UCI ratings from highest to lowest are as follows:

- Multi-day events: 2.HC, 2.1 and 2.2
- One-day events: 1.HC, 1.1 and 1.2

== Events ==
=== 2016 ===
| Date | Race Name | Location | UCI Rating | Winner | Team | Ref |
|---|---|---|---|---|---|---|
| October 24 – November 1 | Vuelta a Guatemala | Guatemala | 2.2 | Román Villalobos (CRC) | Canels Specialized | |
| December 11 | Gran Premio de San José | Costa Rica | 1.2 | Pablo Alarcón (CHI) | Canels Specialized | |
| Dec 13–25 | Vuelta a Costa Rica | Costa Rica | 2.2 | César Rojas Villegas (CRC) | Frijoles Los Tierniticos Arroz Halcón | |

=== 2017 ===
| Date | Race Name | Location | UCI Rating | Winner | Team | Ref |
|---|---|---|---|---|---|---|
| January 13–22 | Vuelta al Táchira | Venezuela | 2.2 | Yonathan Salinas (VEN) | Kino Táchira-Royal Bike | |
| January 23–29 | Vuelta a San Juan | Argentina | 2.1 | Bauke Mollema (NED) | Trek–Segafredo | |
| February 26 – March 5 | Vuelta a la Independencia Nacional | Dominican Republic | 2.2 | Ismael Sánchez (DOM) | Aero Cycling Team | |
| March 30 – April 2 | Joe Martin Stage Race | United States | 2.2 | Robin Carpenter (USA) | Holowesko Citadel Racing Team | |
| April 7–16 | Vuelta al Uruguay | Uruguay | 2.2 | Magno Nazaret (BRA) | Soul Brasil Pro Cycling | |
| April 19–23 | Tour of the Gila | United States | 2.2 | Evan Huffman (USA) | Rally Cycling | |
| May 4 | Pan American Championships – Time Trial | Dominican Republic | CC | José Rodríguez (CHI) | Gamu-La Pintana | |
| May 7 | Pan American Championships – Road Race | Dominican Republic | CC | Nelson Soto (COL) | Coldeportes–Zenú | |
| May 29 | Winston-Salem Cycling Classic | United States | 1.1 | Robin Carpenter (USA) | Holowesko Citadel Racing Team | |
| June 8–11 | Grand Prix Cycliste de Saguenay | Canada | 2.2 | Steve Fisher (USA) | Hangar 15 Bicycles | |
| June 14–18 | Tour de Beauce | Canada | 2.2 | Andžs Flaksis (LAT) | Holowesko Citadel Racing Team | |
| July 9 | White Spot / Delta Road Race | Canada | 1.2 | John Murphy (USA) | Holowesko Citadel Racing Team | |
| July 19–23 | Cascade Cycling Classic | United States | 2.2 | Robin Carpenter (USA) | Holowesko Citadel Racing Team | |
| July 28 – Aug 6 | Tour de Guadeloupe | Guadeloupe | 2.2 | Sébastien Fournet-Fayard (FRA) | Pro Immo Nicolas Roux | |
| July 31 – August 6 | Tour of Utah | United States | 2.HC | Rob Britton (CAN) | Rally Cycling | |
| August 1–13 | Vuelta a Colombia | Colombia | 2.2 | Aristóbulo Cala (COL) | Bicicletas Strongman | |
| August 10–13 | Colorado Classic | United States | 2.HC | Manuel Senni (ITA) | BMC Racing Team | |
| September 1–4 | Tour of Alberta | Canada | 2.1 | Evan Huffman (USA) | Rally Cycling | |
| October 1 | Tobago Cycling Classic | Trinidad and Tobago | 1.2 | Peter Schulting (NED) | PSL | |
| October 11–15 | Vuelta Ciclista de Chile | Chile | 2.2 | Nicolás Paredes (COL) | Medellín–Inder | |
