= Víctor García (cyclist) =

Spanish cyclist

Personal information
- Full name: Víctor Manuel García Estévez
- Born: 5 April 1981 (age 45) Miranda de Ebro, Spain

Cycling career
- Sport: Cycling
- Current team: Retired
- Discipline: Road
- Role: Rider

Amateur teams
- 2001: Saunier Duval–Mapei
- 2002: Bodegas Castillo de Monjardín
- 2003–2005: Alfus–Tedes
- 2010–2012: Canel's Turbo
- 2013–2015: Depredadores Chetumal

Professional teams
- 2006: Grupo Nicolás Mateos
- 2016–2017: Canel's–Specialized

Víctor Manuel García Estévez (born April 5, 1981) is a Spanish former racing cyclist.

García was born in Miranda de Ebro. After winning the second stage time trial, he won the general classification of the Ruta del Centro in 2017. He also took fourth place in the Vuelta Ciclista de Chile, just behind teammate Efrén Santos, who was the best climber of the event. At the end of this season, he retired from cycling, with his last competition being the Vuelta Ciclista a Costa Rica.

== Major results ==
2004
1st Overall Vuelta Ciclista a León
1st Overall Vuelta a Tenerife

1st Stages 4 & 5 (ITT)

2005
1st Road race, National Amateur Road Championships
1st Overall Vuelta a Tenerife

1st Stage 5 (ITT)

1st Mémorial Valenciaga
2006
8th Clásica a los Puertos de Guadarrama
2012
1st Overall Ruta del Centro
2013
1st Overall Ruta del Centro
2014
3rd Overall Vuelta Mexico Telmex
2015
7th Overall Vuelta Mexico Telmex

1st Stage 4

2016
3rd Overall Vuelta a Guatemala
7th Overall Vuelta a Costa Rica

1st Stage 9

8th Gran Premio de San José
2017
1st Overall Ruta del Centro

1st Stage 2 (ITT)

4th Overall Vuelta Ciclista de Chile
