= Josué González =

Costa Rican cyclist

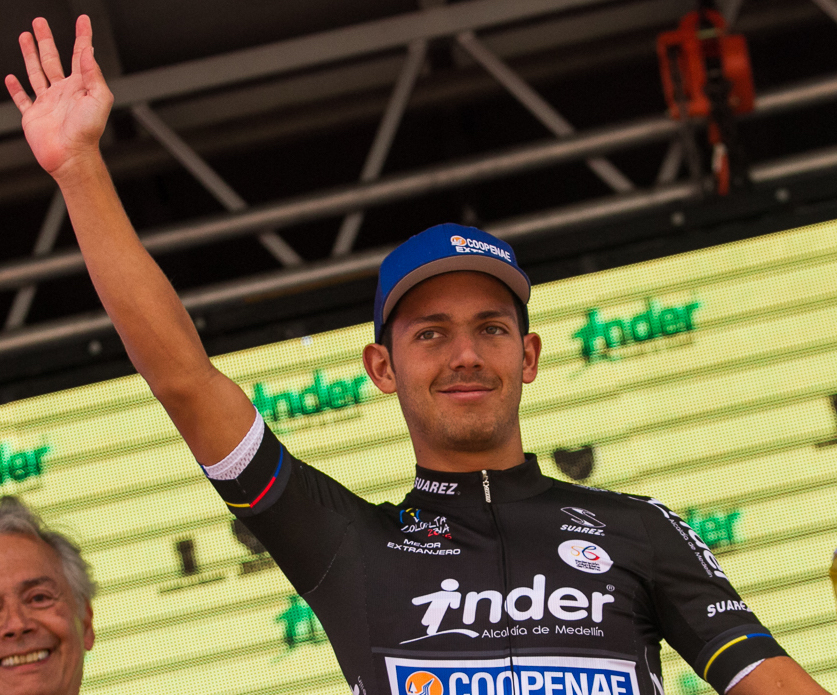
- González at the 2015 Vuelta a Colombia

Personal information
- Full name: Josué González Cortes
- Born: 9 July 1988 (age 38)

Cycling career
- Sport: Cycling
- Current team: Suspended
- Discipline: Road
- Role: Rider

Amateur teams
- 2009: Lizarte
- 2009–2011: Citi Economy Blue
- 2014–2015: Coopenae Movistar Economy

Professional team
- 2016: Coopenae–Extralum
Medal record
Men's road bicycle racing
Representing Costa Rica
Pan American Championships
Silver medal – second place	2015 León	Road race

Josué González Cortes (born 9 July 1988) is a Costa Rican cyclist, who is suspended from the sport, after an adverse analytical finding for ostarine at the 2015 Vuelta Ciclista a Costa Rica.

== Major results ==
~~2011~~
~~8th Overall Vuelta Ciclista a Costa Rica~~
2014
National Road Championships

1st Time trial
3rd Road race

3rd Overall Vuelta Ciclista a Costa Rica
2015
1st Time trial, National Road Championships
Pan American Road Championships

2nd Road race
8th Time trial

~~3rd Overall Vuelta Ciclista a Costa Rica~~
5th Overall Vuelta Mexico Telmex

1st Mountains classification
