= Vuelta a Chiriquí =

Annual cycling road race in Panama

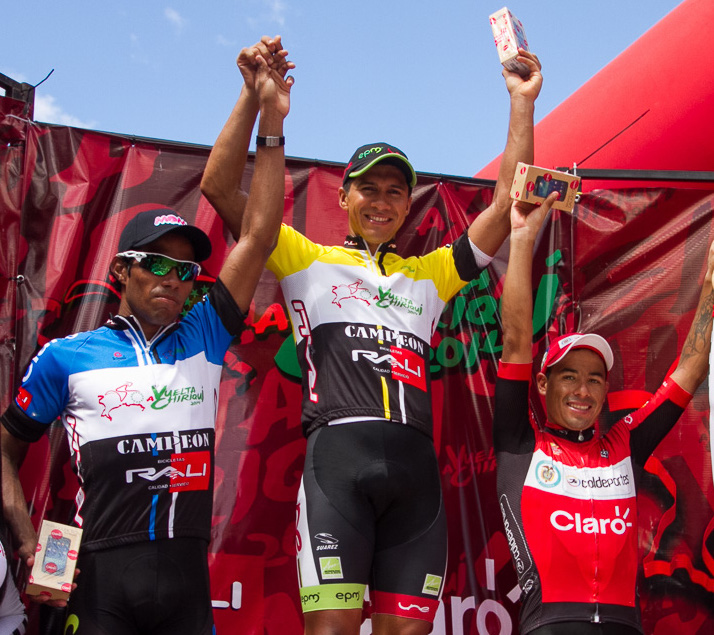
- The podium of the 2014 edition

Race details
- Date: Varies
- Region: Chiriquí Province
- Discipline: Road
- Competition: National calendar
- Type: Stage race
- Organiser: FEPACI
- Web site: vueltainternacionalachiriqui.es.tl

History
- First edition: 1981
- Editions: 42 (as of 2024)
- First winner: Julio César González (PAN)
- Most wins: 6 riders with 2 wins
- Most recent: Bolívar Espinosa (PAN)

The Vuelta a Chiriquí is a road cycling stage race held annually since 1981 in the Chiriquí Province of Panama. It is considered to be one of the main cycling events in Panama alongside the Tour de Panamá.

== Winners ==
Year	Winner	Second	Third
1981	(Panama) Julio César González		
1982	(Colombia) José Manuel Cuevas	(Costa Rica) Rigoberto Zúñiga	(Panama) Alcides Caballero
1983	(Colombia) Alirio Chizabas		
1984	(Colombia) Omar Hernández		
1985	(Costa Rica) Luis Ramírez	(Costa Rica) Olman Ramírez	(Costa Rica) Luis Vargas
1986	(Colombia) Edgar Sánchez	(Costa Rica) Marco Quesada	(Colombia) Orlando Castillo
1987	(Colombia) Edgar Sánchez	(Costa Rica) Carlos Palacios	(Costa Rica) Juan de Dios Castillo
1988	(Colombia) José Vicente Díaz	(Colombia) Pedro Soler	(Colombia) Alfonso Alayón
1989	(Colombia) Óscar Maldonado		
1990	(Costa Rica) Luis Ovidio Vargas		(Colombia) Óscar Maldonado
1991	(Colombia) Óscar Maldonado	(Costa Rica) Alfredo Zamora	(Colombia) Hugo Bolívar
1992	(Panama) Abraham Bethancourt		
1993	(Colombia) Gustavo Wilches		
1994	(Colombia) Carlos Cabrera		
1995	(Costa Rica) Federico Ramírez		
1996	(Austria) Josef Lontscharitsch		
1997	(Colombia) Uberlino Mesa		
1998	(Colombia) Hernán Darío Muñoz		
1999	(Panama) Alexis Caballero	(Panama) César Pinto	(Colombia) Hernán Darío Muñoz
2000	(Colombia) Libardo Niño	(Colombia) Álvaro Lozano	(Colombia) Víctor Becerra
2001	(Colombia) Ubaldo Mesa	(Colombia) Víctor Becerra	(Mexico) José Luis Castel
2002	(Costa Rica) José Adrián Bonilla	(Costa Rica) Deiber Esquivel	(Colombia) Juan Carlos Fonseca
2003	(Costa Rica) Paulo Vargas	(Costa Rica) Federico Ramírez	(Costa Rica) Deiber Esquivel
2004	(Colombia) Héctor Mesa	(Colombia) Argiro Zapata	(Colombia) Alexis Rojas
2005	(Costa Rica) Federico Ramírez	(Costa Rica) Andrey Amador	(Costa Rica) Paulo Vargas
2006	(Costa Rica) Juan Pablo Araya	(Costa Rica) Juan Carlos Rojas	(Costa Rica) Andrey Amador
2007	(Colombia) Diego Calderón	(Colombia) Jhon Freddy García	(Costa Rica) Gregory Brenes
2008	(Costa Rica) José Adrián Bonilla	(Costa Rica) Gregory Brenes	(Costa Rica) José Alberto Montero
2009	(Colombia) Edwar Ortiz	(Colombia) Élder Herrera	(Colombia) Pedro Herrera
2010	(Colombia) Freddy Piamonte	(Colombia) Rafael Infantino	(Colombia) Jaime Castañeda
2011	(Panama) Ramón Carretero	(Colombia) Jorge Humberto Martínez	(Colombia) Álvaro Montoya
2012	(Spain) Óscar Sevilla	(Colombia) Jorge Humberto Martínez	(Colombia) Salvador Moreno
2013	(Costa Rica) Henry Raabe	(Colombia) Julián Rodas	(Costa Rica) José Adrián Bonilla
2014	(Colombia) Róbigzon Oyola	(Panama) Jorge Castelblanco	(Colombia) Luis Alfredo Martínez
2015	(Spain) Óscar Sevilla	(Colombia) Óscar Álvarez	(Colombia) Carlos Ospina
2016	(Colombia) Edwin Carvajal	(Colombia) Nicolás Paredes	(Panama) Jorge Castelblanco
2017	(Panama) Carlos Samudio	(Panama) Jorge Castelblanco	(Spain) Óscar Sevilla
2018	(Colombia) Didier Chaparro	(Costa Rica) Daniel Bonilla	(Costa Rica) Bryan Salas
2019	(Panama) Franklin Archibold	(Panama) Carlos Samudio	(Panama) Jorge Castelblanco
2020	(Panama) Christofer Jurado	(Costa Rica) Gabriel Rojas	(Panama) Franklin Archibold
2021	(Costa Rica) Bryan Salas	(Costa Rica) Rodolfo Villalobos	(Panama) Christofer Jurado
2022	(Colombia) Marco Tulio Suesca	(Costa Rica) Daniel Bonilla	(Panama) Franklin Archibold
2023	(Panama) Franklin Archibold	(Costa Rica) Gabriel Rojas	(Panama) Alex Strah
2024	(Panama) Bolívar Espinosa	(Panama) Michael Caballero	(Costa Rica) Andrés Alpízar
