= Jason Huertas =

Costa Rican cyclist (born 1998)

Personal information
- Full name: Jason Andrey Huertas Araya
- Born: 24 March 1998 (age 28) San Ramón, Costa Rica, Costa Rica

Cycling career
- Sport: Cycling
- Current team: Lasal Cocinas–Craega; Manza Te–La Selva–Scott
- Discipline: Road
- Role: Rider

Amateur teams
- 2016: Auto Partes Mafra–Cartago
- 2017: Lizarte
- 2017: Extralum–Frijoles Los Tierniticos
- 2021–2022: Team Colono–Specialized
- 2022: Ulevel–Safir Fruits
- 2023–: Lasal Cocinas–Louriña
- 2025–: Manza Te–La Selva–Scott

Jason Andrey Huertas Araya (born 24 March 1998) is a Costa Rican road cyclist.

On 31 January 2018, the UCI announced that he had tested positive for EPO on 22 December during the Vuelta Ciclista a Costa Rica, alongside his entire team. He was suspended for three years until 21 December 2020.

He was chosen to compete in the road race at the 2023 UCI Road World Championships, but did not finish.

== Major results ==
2016
Pan American Junior Road Championships

1st Road race
2nd Time trial

National Junior Road Championships

1st Road race
2nd Time trial

2017
1st Gran Premio San Lorenzo
1st San Bartolomé Sari Nagusia
2nd Overall Vuelta a Cantabria
2021
National Road Championships

1st Road race
1st Time trial

1st Stage 1b Vuelta a Chiriquí
2022
National Road Championships

1st Road race
2nd Time trial

1st Gran Premio San Lorenzo
1st Stages 2 & 3 Vuelta Ciclista a Costa Rica
1st Stage 5 Vuelta a Chiriquí
8th Time trial, Central American Road Championships
2023
National Road Championships

1st Road race
1st Time trial

1st Trofeo Caja Rural
1st Gran Premio de la Pobla Llarga
1st Gran Premio Villa de Mojados
2024
1st Time trial, National Road Championships
1st Stage 3 Circuito Montañés
1st Stage 4 Vuelta a Chiriquí
9th Time trial, Pan American Road Championships
2025
1st Gran Premio Villa de Mojados
1st Stage 4 Tour de Panamá
3rd Road race, Pan American Road Championships
3rd Time trial, National Road Championships
