= 2016 Vuelta a Guatemala =

2017 UCI America Tour

Race details
- Dates: October 24 – November 1, 2016
- Stages: 9
- Winning time: 24h 51' 47"

Results
	Winner	Román Villalobos (CRC)
	Second	Manuel Rodas (GUA)
	Third	Víctor García (ESP)
	Mountains	Jefferson Cepeda (ECU)
	Sprints	Dorian Monterroso (GUA)

The 56th edition of the Vuelta a Guatemala was held from 24 October to 1 November 2016.

== Teams ==
Twelve teams entered the race. Each team had a maximum of six riders.

== Route ==
Stage characteristics and winners
Stage	Date	Course	Distance	Type	Stage winner
1	October 24	Guatemala City to El Progreso	130 km (81 mi)	Flat stage	Álder Torres (GUA)
2	October 25	Jutiapa to Chiquimulilla	112.5 km (69.9 mi)	Flat stage	Alfredo Ajpacajá (GUA)
3	October 26	Puerto San José to Retalhuleu	174.5 km (108.4 mi)	Flat stage	Dorian Monterroso (GUA)
4	October 27	Champerico to Retalhuleu	37.8 km (23.5 mi)	Individual time trial	Manuel Rodas (GUA)
5	October 28	San Pedro Sacatepéquez to San Marcos	115 km (71 mi)	Mountain stage	Román Villalobos (CRC)
6	October 29	Quetzaltenango to Quetzaltenango	121 km (75 mi)	Flat stage	Cristian Pita (ECU)
7	October 30	Totonicapán to Sololá	96.7 km (60.1 mi)	Mountain stage	Byron Guamá (ECU)
8	October 31	Chimaltenango to Tecpán Guatemala	109.1 km (67.8 mi)	Mountain stage	Jonathan de León (GUA)
9	November 1	Guatemala City to Guatemala City	105 km (65 mi)	Flat stage	Elías Vega (CRC)

== Result ==
Final general classification

Rank	Rider	Team	Time
1	Román Villalobos (CRC)	Canel's–Specialized	24h 51' 47"
2	Manuel Rodas (GUA)	Cable DX–Decorabaños	+ 1' 24"
3	Víctor García (ESP)	Canel's–Specialized	+ 1' 57"
4	Juan Pablo Rendón (COL)	Aguardiente Antioqueño–Loteria de M	+ 3' 14"
5	Byron Guamá (ECU)	Team Ecuador	+ 3' 16"
6	Elías Vega (CRC)	Nestlé–Giant	+ 4' 20"
7	Jefferson Cepeda (ECU)	Team Ecuador	+ 5' 24"
8	Álder Torres (GUA)	Hino Pizza Hut–RCN	+ 7' 31"
9	Daniel Bonilla (CRC)	Nestlé–Giant	+ 7' 38"
10	Alfredo Ajpacajá (GUA)	Cable DX–Decorabaños	+ 9' 34"
