= María José Vargas (cyclist) =

Costa Rican cyclist

Personal information
- Full name: María José Vargas Barrientos
- Born: 15 February 1996 (age 30)
- Height: 163 cm (5 ft 4 in)

Cycling career
- Sport: Cycling
- Current team: Asfaltos CBZ
- Discipline: Road
- Role: Rider
- Rider type: Climber

Amateur teams
- 2017: El Lagar
- 2022–: Asfaltos CBZ

Professional teams
- 2018–2020: Swapit–Agolíco
- 2021: A.R. Monex

María José Vargas Barrientos (born 15 February 1996) is a Costa Rican racing cyclist, who rides for Costa Rican amateur team Asfaltos CBZ. She competed at the 2020 Summer Olympics.

== Major results ==
2014
1st Time trial, National Junior Road Championships
2015
3rd Time trial, National Road Championships
2016
National Road Championships

2nd Time trial
3rd Road race

2017
National Road Championships

2nd Road race
3rd Time trial

2018
National Road Championships

1st Time trial
1st Road race

3rd Overall Vuelta Internacional Femenina a Costa Rica

1st Points classification
1st Young rider classification
1st Stage 3

5th Gran Premio Comite Olimpico Nacional Femenino
6th Time trial, Central American and Caribbean Games
2019
Central American Road Championships

1st Road race
3rd Time trial

National Road Championships

1st Time trial
2nd Road race

2020
2nd Road race, Central American Road Championships
2021
2nd Road race, Central American Road Championships
National Road Championships

2nd Time trial
3rd Road race
