= Federico Ramírez =

Costa Rican mountain biker

Personal information
- Full name: Federico Ramírez Méndez
- Nickname: Lico
- Born: 4 November 1975 (age 50) Cot District, Costa Rica
- Height: 1.76 m (5 ft 9 in)
- Weight: 71 kg (157 lb)

Cycling career
- Sport: Cycling
- Current team: Retired
- Disciplines: Mountain biking; Road
- Role: Rider

Amateur teams
- 1994–2002: Café de Costa Rica–Pizza Hut
- 2003–2004: Pizza Hut–Bancrédito
- 2004: Cropusa–Burgos
- 2005–2014: BCR–Pizza Hut

Federico Ramírez Méndez (born November 4, 1975) is a Costa Rican former road cyclist and mountain biker. Ramirez represented Costa Rica at the 2008 Summer Olympics in Beijing, where he competed in the men's cross-country race. He did not finish the race, before reaching the 13.4 km lap of the course.

== Major results ==
=== Road ===
1995
1st Overall Vuelta a Chiriquí
1999
1st Stages 2, 3 & 7 Vuelta a Costa Rica
1st Prologue Vuelta a Chiriquí
2000
1st Overall Vuelta a Costa Rica
1st Stages 9 & 11
2001
1st Stage 3 Vuelta a Chiriquí
2nd Time trial, National Championships
2002
1st Stage 2 Vuelta a Costa Rica
2003
1st Stage 13 Vuelta a Costa Rica
2nd Overall Vuelta a Chiriquí

1st Stages 3, 4, 5 & 9

2004
1st Stage 3 Vuelta a Zamora
National Championships

3rd Road race
3rd Time trial

6th Overall Vuelta a Costa Rica

1st Stages 5 (TTT) & 12

6th Overall Vuelta a Guatemala
2005
1st Time trial, National Championships
5th Overall Vuelta a Costa Rica
2006
4th Overall Vuelta a Costa Rica

1st Stage 11

2007
4th Overall Vuelta a Costa Rica
2008
8th Overall Vuelta a Costa Rica
2009
1st Stage 1 (TTT) Vuelta a Costa Rica
2013
4th Road race, National Championships

=== Mountain bike ===
1997
1st Overall Ruta de los Conquistadores
1998
1st Overall Ruta de los Conquistadores
2002
1st Overall Ruta de los Conquistadores
2007
1st Overall Ruta de los Conquistadores
2008
1st Cross-country, National Championships
1st Overall Ruta de los Conquistadores
