= Gregory Brenes =

Costa Rican cyclist (born 1988)

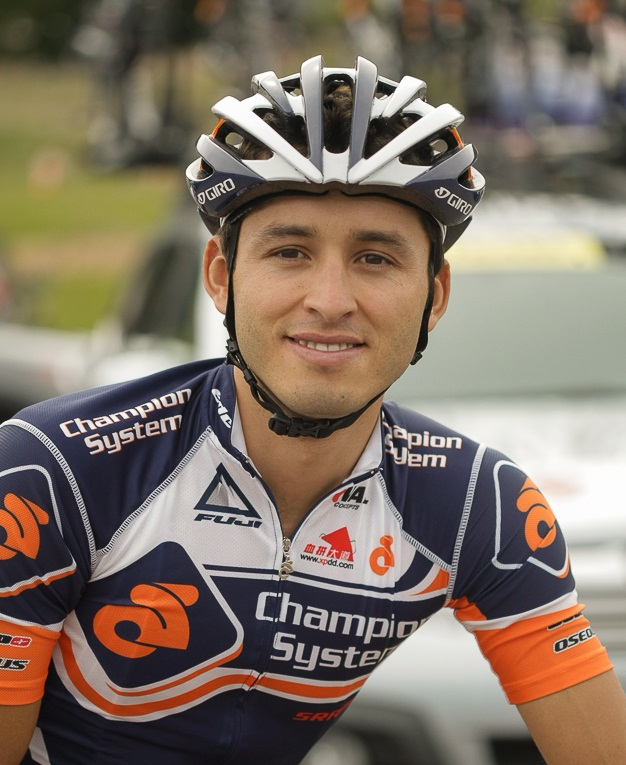
- Brenes in 2013

Personal information
- Full name: Gregory Brenes Obando
- Born: April 21, 1988 (age 38) Costa Rica

Cycling career
- Sport: Cycling
- Current team: Wilier Triestina CR
- Disciplines: Road; Mountain biking
- Role: Rider

Amateur teams
- 2008: BCR–Pizza Hut
- 2013: Coopenae Movistar Economy
- 2018–: 7C Sports

Professional teams
- 2009: Continental Team Differdange
- 2010: Burgos 2016–Castilla y León
- 2011–2012: Movistar Continental Team
- 2013: Champion System (stagiaire)
- 2014–2015: Jamis–Hagens Berman
- 2016: Coopenae–Extralum
- 2017: Inteja Dominican Cycling Team
Medal record
Men's road bicycle racing
Representing Costa Rica
Pan American Championships
Silver medal – second place	2009 Hidalgo	Time trial

Gregory Brenes Obando (born April 21, 1988) is a Costa Rican cyclist.

== Major results ==
2006
National Junior Road Championships

1st Time trial
1st Road race

2007
3rd Overall Vuelta Ciclista a Costa Rica
2008
1st Overall Vuelta Ciclista a Costa Rica

1st Stage 13 (ITT)

2009
Pan American Road and Track Championships

1st Under-23 time trial
2nd Time trial

1st Time trial, National Under-23 Road Championships
2nd Overall Vuelta Ciclista a Costa Rica

1st Stage 1 (TTT)

2010
3rd Overall Grand Prix du Portugal
4th Overall Vuelta Ciclista a Costa Rica
10th Overall Vuelta a Asturias
2011
4th Time trial, Pan American Games
8th Overall Vuelta a Colombia
10th Overall Vuelta Ciclista a Costa Rica

1st Stages 5 (ITT) & 11

2012
5th Overall Vuelta al Mundo Maya

1st Prologue

2013
2nd Time trial, National Road Championships
6th Overall USA Pro Cycling Challenge
2014
1st Overall Tucson Bicycle Classic

1st Stage 1

2nd Overall Tour of the Gila
2015
2nd Overall Joe Martin Stage Race

1st Stage 1 (ITT)

9th Philly Cycling Classic
2016
3rd Time trial, National Road Championships
