= José Vega (cyclist) =

Costa Rican bicycle racer

Personal information
- Full name: José Andrés Vega Solano
- Born: 22 November 1987 (age 38)

Cycling career
- Sport: Cycling
- Current team: Specialized–Sram
- Discipline: Road
- Role: Rider

Amateur teams
- 2007–2008: IBP Pensiones
- 2009–2010: Lizarte
- 2011–2014: JPS–Giant
- 2015–2019: Nestlé–Giant
- 2020–: Specialized–Sram

José Andrés Vega Solano (born 22 November 1987) is a Costa Rican road racing cyclist. His younger brother Elías is also a cyclist.

== Major results ==
2006
National Under-23 Road Championships

3rd Road race
3rd Time trial

2008
2nd Time trial, National Under-23 Road Championships
2011
2nd Time trial, National Road Championships
2012
1st Overall Vuelta a Nicaragua

1st Stages 1, 2 (TTT), 4 & 5

2nd Time trial, National Road Championships
2013
6th Overall Vuelta Ciclista a Costa Rica

1st Stages 2 & 6

2014
1st Stage 6 Vuelta Ciclista a Costa Rica
2017
1st Stage 2 Vuelta Ciclista a Costa Rica
