= Pablo Alarcón =

Pablo Alarcón may refer to:

- Pablo Alarcón (actor) (born 1946), Argentine actor
- Pablo Alarcón (cyclist) (born 1988), Chilean cyclist
