= José Andrés Brenes =

Costa Rican cyclist

Personal information
- Born: 18 December 1964 (age 61) Cartago, Costa Rica
- Height: 1.73 m (5 ft 8 in)
- Weight: 62 kg (137 lb)

Cycling career
- Sport: Cycling
Medal record
Representing Costa Rica
Pan American Games
Silver medal – second place	1995 Mar del Plata	Men's Mountain Bike (MTB)

José Andrés Brenes (born 18 December 1964) is a Costa Rican cyclist. He competed in the men's cross-country mountain biking event at the 1996 Summer Olympics.

== Major results ==
1990
2nd Overall Vuelta Ciclista a Costa Rica
1991
1st Overall Vuelta a Guatemala

1994
1st Overall Vuelta Ciclista a Costa Rica
