= José Adrián Bonilla =

Costa Rican cyclist

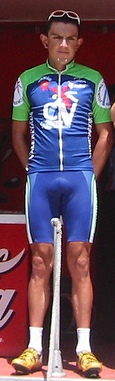
- Bonilla at Euskal Bizikleta 2005

Personal information
- Full name: José Adrián Bonilla Bonilla
- Born: 28 April 1978 (age 48) Paraíso, Costa Rica
- Height: 1.78 m (5 ft 10 in)
- Weight: 73 kg (161 lb)

Cycling career
- Sport: Cycling
- Current team: Retired
- Discipline: Road
- Role: Rider
- Rider type: Time trialist; All-rounder

Amateur teams
- 1999–2002: Café de Costa Rica–Pizza Hut
- 2003: Cropusa–Burgos
- 2003: Pizza Hut–Bancredito
- 2007–2008: BCR–Pizza Hut
- 2009–2011: Citi-Economy-Blue
- 2012–2013: Coopenae–Economy–Gallo Bikes

Professional teams
- 2004–2006: Comunidad Valenciana–Kelme
- 2007: Fuerteventura–Canarias

Major wins
- One-day races and Classics National Time Trial Championships (2001, 2004, 2009, 2010, 2011)

José Adrián Bonilla Bonilla (born April 28, 1978) is a Costa Rican former professional road bicycle racer. He competed at the 2000 Summer Olympics and the 2004 Summer Olympics. He debuted professionally in 2004 with the team Comunidad Valenciana.

In 2006, during the Operación Puerto doping case by the Spanish police, he was identified as the client of a doping traffic network led by Eufemiano Fuentes, under the code name Bonilla Alfredo. Bonilla was not sanctioned by the Spanish government since doping was not a crime at the time. He did not receive any other sanction either since the judge assigned to the case refused to share the case's evidence with the World Anti-Doping Agency or the Union Cycliste Internationale. Spanish court 31 later cleared him and all the other members of Comunidad Valenciana of any involvement in the case. On a document dated 28 July 2006 the court's secretary made clear none of the team members were found guilty of doping.

== Major results ==
1999
1st Stage 7 Vuelta a Chiriquí
2nd Overall Vuelta Ciclista a Costa Rica

1st Stage 11

2001
1st Time trial, National Road Championships
1st Prologue Vuelta a Guatemala
2002
1st Overall Vuelta de Higuito
1st Overall Vuelta a Chiriquí

1st Prologue

1st Stage 10 Vuelta Ciclista a Costa Rica
2003
1st Overall Vuelta Ciclista a Costa Rica

1st Stage 8

1st Overall Vuelta a Zamora

1st Stage 2

1st Overall Vuelta a Galicia
1st Stage 1 Vuelta a Chiriquí
2004
1st Time trial, National Road Championships
3rd Overall Gran Premio Estremadura-RTP

1st Stage 1

2005
6th Overall Trofeu Joaquim Agostinho
2006
6th Overall Vuelta a Andalucía
2007
8th Trofeo Pollença
9th Trofeo Sóller
10th Overall Vuelta a Chihuahua
10th Overall Vuelta Ciclista a Costa Rica
2008
1st Overall Clásica Poás
1st Overall Vuelta a Chiriquí

1st Stages 6, 8 & 9

1st Copa Nacional Protecto
1st Stage 3 Vuelta a San Carlos
2nd Overall Vuelta Ciclista a Costa Rica

1st Stages 10 & 12

2009
1st Time trial, National Road Championships
1st Stage 4 Vuelta a San Carlos
1st Prologue Vuelta a Chiriquí
5th Overall Vuelta Ciclista a Costa Rica

1st Stages 6 & 11

2010
1st Time trial, National Road Championships
Central American Games

1st Time trial
2nd Road race

1st Desafio Powerade
6th Time trial, Pan American Road Championships
8th Overall Vuelta Ciclista a Costa Rica
2011
1st Time trial, National Road Championships
1st Overall Vuelta Ciclista a Costa Rica

1st Stages 7 & 10

1st Stages 5 & 7 Vuelta de Higuito
2013
1st Stage 4 (TTT) Vuelta a Chiriquí
3rd Time trial, National Road Championships
9th Overall Vuelta Ciclista a Costa Rica
