= Carlos Alvarado Reyes =

Costa Rican cyclist

Personal information
- Born: 8 December 1954 Los Angeles, California, United States
- Died: 25 January 1998 (aged 43) Puntarenas, Costa Rica

Cycling career
- Sport: Cycling

Carlos Alvarado Reyes (8 December 1954 – 25 January 1998) was a Costa Rican cyclist. He competed in the individual road race event at the 1976 Summer Olympics. In 1977 he won the Vuelta a Costa Rica.
