= Joseph Chavarría =

Costa Rican cyclist

Personal information
- Full name: Joseph Eladio Chavarría Rodríguez
- Born: October 14, 1992 (age 34) San José, Costa Rica

Cycling career
- Sport: Cycling
- Discipline: Road
- Role: Rider

Amateur teams
- 2011–2014: JPS–Giant
- 2015–2016: Nestlé–Giant
- 2016–2019: Nestlé–Giant
- 2020–2022: 7C–CBZ–Economy–Wilier

Professional team
- 2016: Lupus Racing Team

Joseph Eladio Chavarría Rodríguez (born 14 October 1992) is a Costa Rican cyclist, who last rode for amateur team 7C–Economy–Lacoinex.

== Major results ==
2009
2nd Road race, National Junior Road Championships
2014
National Road Championships

1st Under-23 road race
2nd Road race

5th Overall Vuelta Ciclista a Costa Rica

1st Young rider classification

2015
5th Overall Vuelta Ciclista a Costa Rica

1st Stages 4 & 5 (ITT)

2016
1st Road race, National Road Championships
1st Overall Vuelta al Táchira
4th Overall Vuelta Ciclista a Costa Rica
7th Overall Vuelta a la Independencia Nacional
2017
5th Overall Vuelta Ciclista a Costa Rica
2018
1st Road race, National Road Championships
8th Overall Vuelta Ciclista a Costa Rica
2022
3rd Road race, National Road Championships
6th Overall Vuelta Ciclista a Costa Rica
