= José Belda =

Spanish cyclist (born 1975)

Personal information
- Full name: José Belda Mira
- Born: 6 June 1975 (age 51) Ontinyent, Spain

Cycling career
- Sport: Cycling
- Current team: Retired
- Discipline: Road
- Role: Rider

Amateur teams
- 2009–2011: Asfaltos Guerola
- 2012: Gsport–Valencia Terra i Mar

José Belda Mira (born 6 June 1975) is a Spanish former amateur road racing cyclist.

== Career ==
Hailing from Ontinyent, in the Province of Valencia, Belda started cycling at the age of 26, later than most. He made his competition debut in the highest amateur level in Spain at 30 years old. In 2006, he celebrated his first victory at this level, winning the second stage of the Vuelta a Galicia.

In 2007, Belda was unable to compete in the GP Macario due to having a hematocrit level above 50%. A few months later, he won his first Vuelta a Tenerife. In 2008, Belda celebrated several more victories, including the Quebrantahuesos, one of the most well-known and difficult amateur races in the country.

From 2009 to 2011, Belda was the best amateur cyclist in Spain. Victorious on numerous occasions, he was particularly famous during the 2011 season by winning 30 races, including many of the stage races on the Spanish amateur calendar (Volta ás Comarcas de Lugo, Vuelta a Castellón, Vuelta a Tenerife, Tour of the Province of Valencia, Vuelta a Galicia, Vuelta a Cantabria). These impressive performances, although attracting the attention of Spanish professional teams, such as Geox–TMC and Movistar Team, also caused doubts among other Spanish cyclists.

In 2012, Belda's success continued. In May, he stood out among professionals, when he finished third in the queen stage and fourth overall in the Vuelta a la Comunidad de Madrid, a UCI Europe Tour 2.1 event, while riding with the Spanish national team. After this performance, Eusebio Unzué, the team manager of Movistar Team, planned to offer Belda a professional contract with the team for the following season. However, the UCI announces that they have received two positive anti-doping tests from Belda, for methyltestosterone and ritalinic acid, both in races Belda won. After these tests, Belda served a two-year suspension, ultimately ending his career.

== Major results ==
2006
1st Stage 2 Vuelta a Galicia
2007
1st Overall Vuelta a Tenerife

1st Stage 2

2008
2nd Overall Vuelta a Tenerife

1st Stages 4 & 5a

2009
1st Time trial, National Amateur Road Championships
1st Overall Vuelta a Tenerife

1st Stages 1, 3 & 5a

1st Stage 4 Circuito Montañés
1st Gran Premio Primavera de Ontur
5th Overall Cinturón a Mallorca
2010
1st Overall Vuelta a Tenerife

1st Stages 2, 4 & 5a

1st Stage 1 Vuelta a Cantabria
2nd Time trial, National Amateur Road Championships
10th Overall Cinturó de l'Empordà
2011
1st Time trial, National Amateur Road Championships
1st Gran Premio Primavera de Ontur
1st Trofeo Olías Industrial
1st Prueba Loinaz
1st Ronda al Maestrazgo
1st Overall Vuelta a Tenerife

1st Stages 1, 3, 4 & 5

1st Overall Vuelta a Castellón

1st Stages 1, 2 & 4

1st Overall Volta ás Comarcas de Lugo
1st Overall Tour of the Province of Valencia

1st Stages 1 & 4

1st Overall Vuelta a Galicia

1st Stage 1

1st Overall Vuelta a Cantabria

1st Stage 1

6th Overall Vuelta Ciclista a León
6th Overall Cinturón a Mallorca

1st Stage 1

2012

Voided results

~~1st Overall Vuelta Ciclista a León~~

~~1st Stage 2~~

1st Trofeo Olías Industrial
1st Overall Vuelta a Tenerife

1st Stage 1b

2nd Volta ao Ribeiro
2nd Overall Vuelta a Ávila
3rd Overall Vuelta a Castellón

1st Stage 3

4th Overall Vuelta a la Comunidad de Madrid
