= Adrià Moreno =

Spanish road racing cyclist

Personal information
- Full name: Adrià Moreno Sala
- Born: 19 August 1991 (age 35) Olot, Spain
- Height: 1.76 m (5 ft 9 in)
- Weight: 59 kg (130 lb)

Cycling career
- Sport: Cycling
- Current team: Retired
- Discipline: Road
- Role: Rider
- Rider type: Climber

Amateur teams
- 2010–2011: Ayuntamiento de Tarragona
- 2012: Mopesa
- 2013: Atika–Asmeval
- 2014: ControlPack
- 2015: Velosure Starley Primal
- 2018–2019: AVC Aix-en-Provence
- 2020: VC Villefranche Beaujolais

Professional teams
- 2016–2017: Team Raleigh–GAC
- 2021: Team Vorarlberg
- 2022: Burgos BH

Adrià Moreno Sala (born 19 August 1991) is a Spanish former cyclist, who competed as a professional between 2016 and 2022.

== Major results ==
2014
1st Volta a Lleida
3rd Overall Vuelta a León
2017
10th Beaumont Trophy
2018
1st Mountains classification, Circuit des Ardennes International
2nd Overall Vuelta a Tenerife

1st Stages 2 & 3

7th Overall Tour du Jura Cycliste
10th Tour du Gévaudan Occitanie
2019
1st Overall Vuelta a Tenerife

1st Stages 2a (TTT), 3 & 4

2020
6th Overall Le Tour de Savoie Mont Blanc
2021
6th Mercan'Tour Classic Alpes-Maritimes
6th Overall Oberösterreichrundfahrt
9th Overall Tour Alsace
