= 2010 Vuelta a Asturias =

Race details
- Dates: 28 April–2 May 2010
- Stages: 5
- Distance: 769.4 km (478.1 mi)
- Winning time: ~~19h 52' 51"~~

Results
Jersey awarded to the overall winner	Winner	~~Constantino Zaballa~~ (ESP)	(~~CC Loulé–Louletano–Aquashow~~)
	Second	Fabio Duarte (COL)	(Café de Colombia–Colombia es Pasión)
	Third	Beñat Intxausti (ESP)	(Euskaltel–Euskadi)
Jersey awarded to the points classification winner	Points	Ángel Vicioso (ESP)	(Androni Giocattoli)
Jersey awarded to the mountains classification winner	Mountains	Fabio Duarte (COL)	(Café de Colombia–Colombia es Pasión)
Jersey awarded to the sprints classification winner	Sprints	Gonzalo Rabuñal (ESP)	(Xacobeo–Galicia)

The 2010 Vuelta a Asturias was the 54th edition of the Vuelta a Asturias road cycling stage race, which was held from 28 April to 2 May 2010. The race started and finished in Oviedo. The race was initially won by Constantino Zaballa of the CC Loulé–Louletano–Aquashow team. Zaballa's result was annulled by the Union Cycliste Internationale in 2012, after Zaballa had tested positive for using ephedrine.

== General classification ==
Final general classification

Rank	Rider	Team	Time
~~1~~	~~Constantino Zaballa (ESP)~~	~~CC Loulé–Louletano–Aquashow~~	~~19h 52' 51"~~
2	Fabio Duarte (COL)	Café de Colombia–Colombia es Pasión	+ 58"
3	Beñat Intxausti (ESP)	Euskaltel–Euskadi	+ 1' 17"
4	Ezequiel Mosquera (ESP)	Xacobeo–Galicia	+ 1' 47"
5	Santiago Pérez (ESP)	CC Loulé–Louletano–Aquashow	+ 1' 48"
6	José Herrada (ESP)	Caja Rural	+ 2' 06"
7	Alex Cano (COL)	Café de Colombia–Colombia es Pasión	+ 2' 28"
8	David Blanco (ESP)	Palmeiras–Resort–Prio	+ 2' 57"
9	Ángel Vicioso (ESP)	Andalucía–Cajasur	+ 3' 13"
10	Gregory Brenes (CRI)	Burgos 2016–Castilla y León	+ 3' 15"
