= Julián Rodas =

Colombian bicycle racer

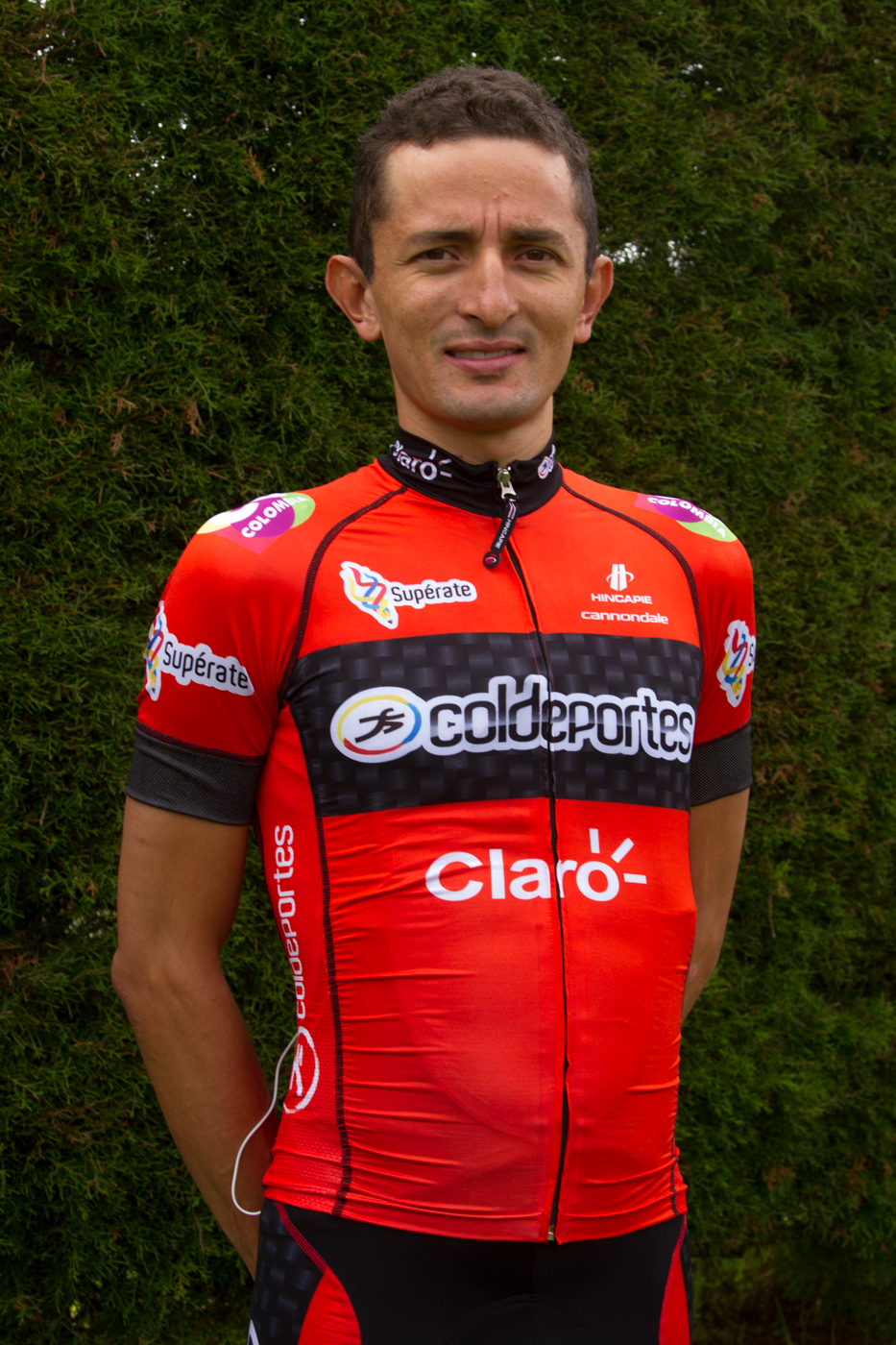
- Rodas in 2013

Personal information
- Full name: Julián Andrés Rodas Ramírez
- Born: 2 January 1982 (age 44) Pereira, Colombia

Cycling career
- Sport: Cycling
- Current team: Retired
- Discipline: Road
- Role: Rider

Professional teams
- 2011–2012: Gobernación de Antioquia–Indeportes Antioquia
- 2013: Colombia–Coldeportes
- 2015: InCycle–Cannondale

Julián Andrés Rodas Ramírez (born 2 January 1982 in Pereira) is a Colombian former professional cyclist.

== Major results ==
2009
3rd Overall Vuelta Ciclista a Costa Rica

1st Stage 7

2012
1st Overall Vuelta Mexico Telmex

1st Stage 2
