= Saturnino Rustrián =

Guatemalan cyclist

Personal information
- Born: 29 November 1942 San José Piñula, Guatemala
- Died: 14 July 2013 (aged 70)

Cycling career
- Sport: Cycling

Saturnino Rustrián Cáceres (29 November 1942 – 14 July 2013) was a Guatemalan road racing cyclist who won the second and fourth editions of the annual Vuelta a Costa Rica in 1966 and 1968 and the 10th edition of the Vuelta a Guatemala in 1966.

Born in San José Pinula, he was the first local cyclist to win the Vuelta a Guatemala while competing against participants from Colombia, who had dominated the event in previous years. He is one of three cyclists to have won the Vuelta a Costa Rica twice, since the competition began in 1965.

Rustrián represented Guatemala at the 1968 Olympic Games cycling competitions, ranking 21st and 22nd in the individual road race and time trial events respectively.

Nicknamed el Chapín de Acero ("Guatemala man of steel"), he was a road cyclist for over four decades, and as of 2005, at over 60 years of age, has remained active, competing in several local and international "master" races.
