= Vuelta a Tenerife =

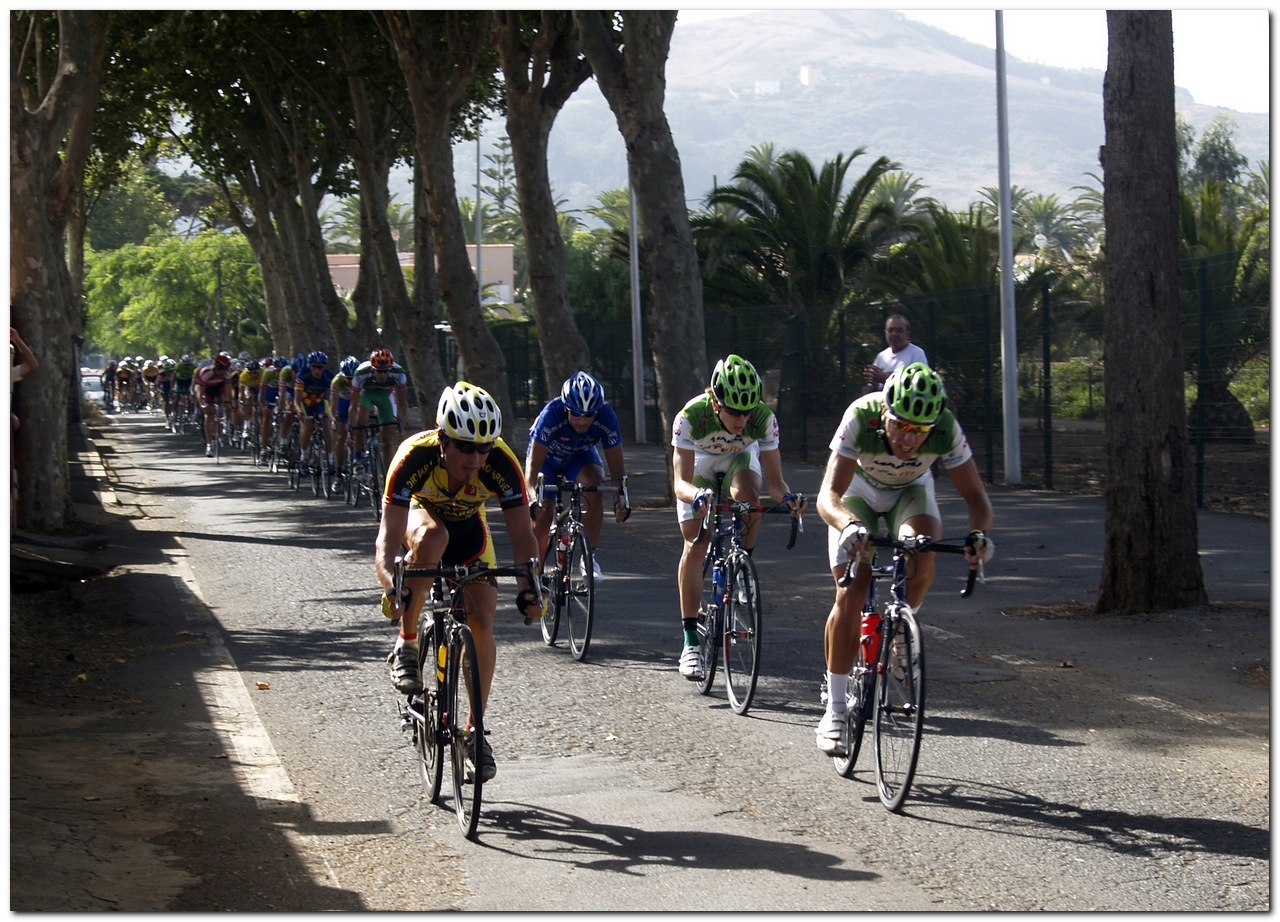
- The race in 2007

Race details
- Date: September
- Region: Tenerife, Spain
- English name: Tour of Tenerife
- Discipline: Road
- Type: Stage race
- Web site: www.vueltaciclistatenerife.com

History
- First edition: 1956
- Editions: 64 (as of 2019)
- First winner: Manuel Brito Marichal (ESP)
- Most wins: José Belda (ESP) (5 wins)
- Most recent: Adrià Moreno (ESP) (2019)

The Vuelta a Tenerife is a multi-day road cycling race held annually on the island of Tenerife in Spain.

== Winners ==
Year	Winner	Second	Third	ref
1956	(Spain) Manuel Brito Marichal	no data		
1957	(Spain) Manuel Brito Marichal	no data		
1958	(Spain) Esteban González Quintero	no data		
1959	(Spain) Esteban González Quintero	no data		
1960	(Spain) José González Delgado	no data		
1961	(Spain) Esteban González Quintero	no data		
1962	(Spain) Toñín Salas	no data		
1963	(Spain) Sebastián Berriel	no data		
1964	(Spain) Sebastián Berriel	no data		
1965–1966	no data			
1967	(Spain) Toñín Salas	no data		
1968	(Spain) Tomás Amador Reyes	no data		
1969	no data			
1970	(Spain) Tomás Amador Reyes	no data		
1971–1978	no data			
1979	(Spain) José Manuel González Espinosa	no data		
1980	(Spain) José Manuel González Espinosa	no data		
1981–1982	no data			
1983	(Spain) Jesús Miguel López Dóriga	no data		
1984–1985	no data			
1986	(Spain) José Ramón Pérez Hernández	no data		
1987–1994	no data			
1995	(Spain) Juan Pedro González	(Spain) Igor Astarloa	no data	
1996–1997	no data			
1998	(Spain) Luis Diego Prior	(Spain) Ezequiel Mosquera	(Spain) Iñaki Isasi	
1999	(Spain) Jorge Sedano	(Spain) Joan Horrach	(Spain) Pedro Luis González	
2000	(Spain) Santiago Pérez	(Spain) Manuel Calvente	(Italy) Cristian Sambi	
2001	(Spain) Pedro Arreitunandia	(Spain) Juan Manuel Fuentes	(Ukraine) Volodymir Savchenko	
2002	(Spain) Joseba Albizu	no data		
2003	(Sweden) John Nilsson	(Spain) Jesús Javier Ramírez	(Spain) Dailos Manuel Díaz	
2004	(Spain) Víctor García	(Spain) Dailos Manuel Díaz	(Spain) Iván Uberuaga	
2005	(Spain) Víctor García	(Spain) José de Jesús	(Spain) José Antonio Arroyo	
2006	(Spain) Ismael Esteban	(Spain) Francisco Torrella	(Spain) Hertor Alexa Cruz	
2007	(Spain) José Belda	(Colombia) Diego Tamayo	(Spain) Francisco Torrella	
2008	(Spain) Antonio Olmo	(Spain) José Belda	(Spain) Francisco Torrella	
2009	(Spain) José Belda	(Spain) Francisco Torrella	(Italy) Angelo Pagani	
2010	(Spain) José Belda	(Spain) Esteban Plaza	(Spain) Israel Pérez	
2011	(Spain) José Belda	(Portugal) César Fonte	(Portugal) Bruno Silva	
2012	(Spain) José Belda	(Ukraine) Oleg Chuzhda	(France) Julien Loubet	
2013	(Spain) Juan Pedro Trujillo	(Austria) Mathias Nothegger	(Spain) Marcos García Ortega	
2014	(Spain) Marcos García Ortega	(Spain) Vicente González	(Austria) Mathias Nothegger	
2015	(Italy) Euprepio Calo	(Austria) Mathias Nothegger	(Spain) Yacomar García	
2016	(Spain) Iván Martínez Jiménez	(Spain) Daniel Domínguez	(Spain) Adrián Trujillo	
2017	(Norway) Erlend Sor	(Italy) Umberto Marengo	(Spain) Adrián Trujillo	
2018	(Spain) Eusebio Pascual	(Spain) Adrià Moreno	(Spain) Jorge Martín Montenegro	
2019	(Spain) Adrià Moreno	(France) Romain Campistrous	(France) Florent Castellarnau	
