= Milagro Mena =

Costa Rican cyclist (born 1993)

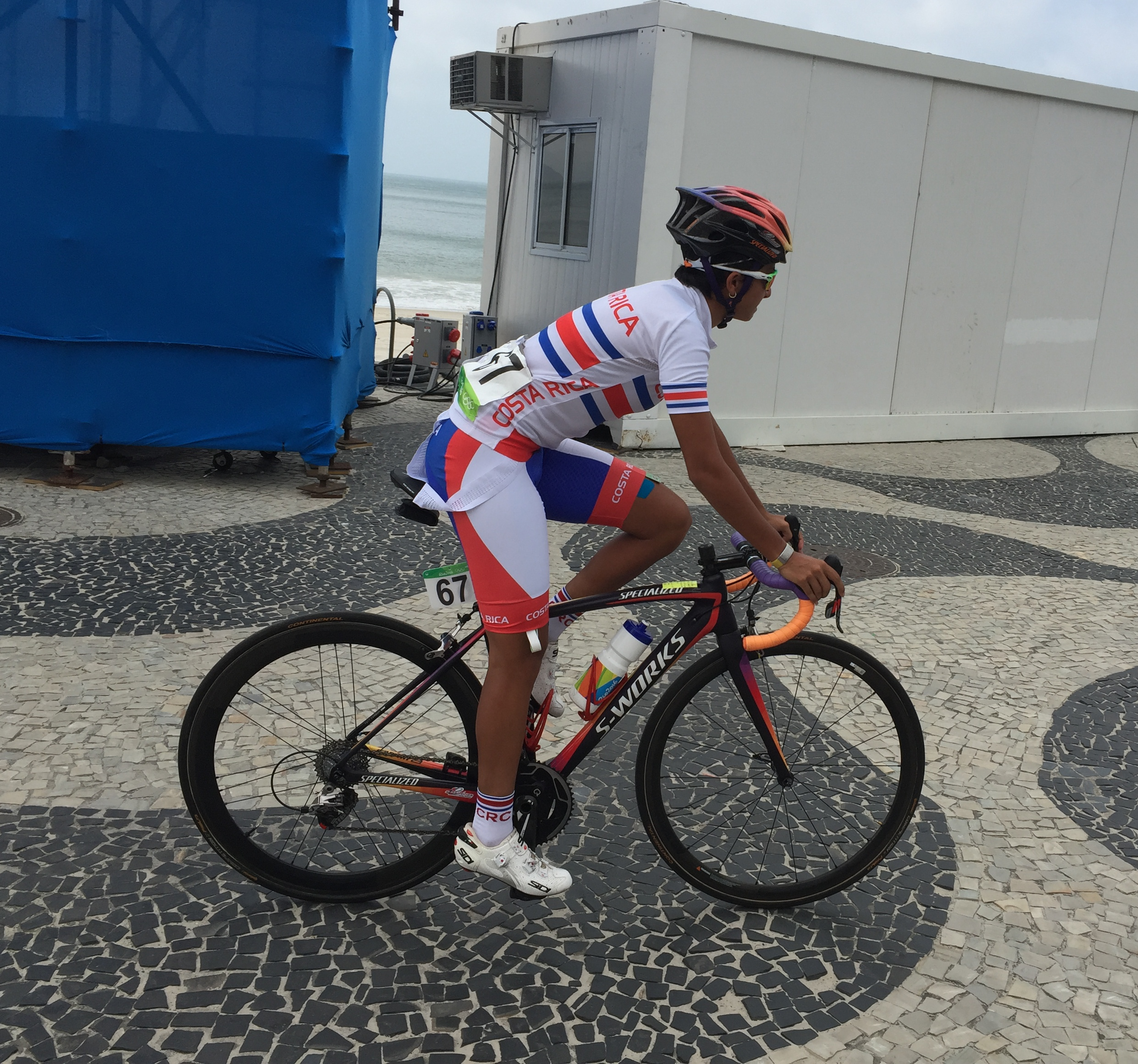
- Mena at the 2016 Summer Olympics

Personal information
- Full name: Milagro Mena Solano
- Born: 30 April 1993 (age 33) Puntarenas, Costa Rica

Cycling career
- Sport: Cycling
- Current team: Soltec Iberoamérica
- Discipline: Road
- Role: Rider

Amateur teams
- 2021: Team Specialized
- 2022: Colono Construcción–Bike Station
- 2023: Colono Bikestation Kölbi

Professional teams
- 2017: SAS–Macogep
- 2020: Servetto–Piumate–Beltrami TSA
- 2022: Servetto–Makhymo–Beltrami TSA
- 2024–: Soltec Iberoamérica

Milagro Mena Solano (born 30 April 1993) is a Costa Rican racing cyclist, who rides for UCI Women's Continental Team Soltec Iberoamérica. She rode in the women's road race at the 2015 UCI Road World Championships. She also represented Costa Rica at the 2024 Summer Olympics in Paris in Women's road race, where she ultimately failed to finish the race.

== Major results ==
2015
1st Overall Vuelta Internacional Femenina a Costa Rica
National Road Championships

2nd Time trial
3rd Road race

2016
National Road Championships

1st Time trial
2nd Road race

4th Copa Federación Venezolana de Ciclismo
5th Grand Prix de Venezuela
7th Overall Vuelta Internacional Femenina a Costa Rica
10th Gran Premio de Venezuela
2017
1st Time trial, National Road Championships
2018
National Road Championships

2nd Time trial
2nd Road race

Central American and Caribbean Games

3rd Cross-country
9th Road race

6th Overall Vuelta Internacional Femenina a Costa Rica
6th Gran Premio Comite Olimpico Nacional Femenino
2019
National Road Championships

1st Road race
4th Time trial

3rd Clásica Esencial Costa Rica
9th Overall Vuelta Tica Internacional
2020
1st Road Central American Championships, Road race
2021
1st Time trial, National Road Championships
Road Central American Championships

1st Road race
2nd Time trial

10th Time trial, Pan American Road Championships
2022
Campeonatos Centroamericanos de Ruta

1st Road race
1st Road race

2023
National Road Championships

1st Time trial
5th Road race

Road Central American Championships

3rd Road race
4th Time trial

10th Road race, Pan American Road Championships

Olympic Games
Preceded by Ian Sancho; Andrea Vargas	Flag bearer for Costa Rica; Paris 2024 with Gerald Drummond	Succeeded by Incumbent
