= Óscar Eduardo Sánchez =

Colombian cyclist

Óscar Sánchez
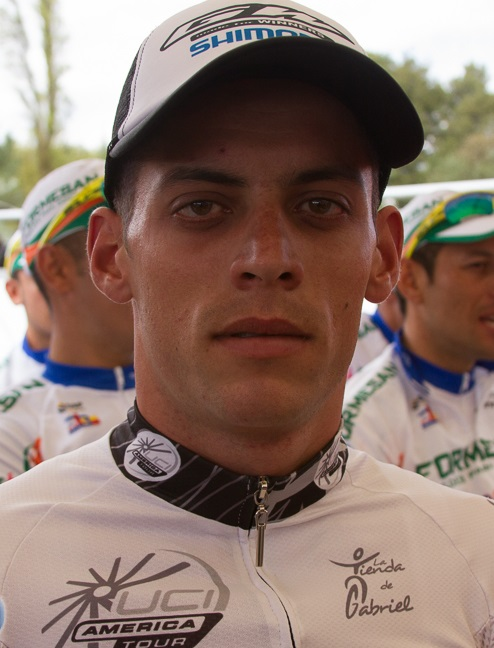
- Sánchez in 2013

Personal information
- Full name: Óscar Eduardo Sánchez Guarín
- Born: 14 May 1985 (age 41) Manizales, Colombia

Cycling career
- Sport: Cycling
- Discipline: Road
- Role: Rider

Amateur teams
- 2011–2013: GW–Shimano
- 2014: Formesan–Bogotá Humana

Professional teams
- 2006–2010: Colombia es Pasión
- 2014: Funvic Brasilinvest–São José dos Campos
- 2015: Orgullo Antioqueño
- 2016–2017: Strongman–Campagnolo–Wilier
- 2018–2019: Canel's–Specialized
- 2020: Equipo Continental Supergiros

Óscar Eduardo Sánchez Guarín (born 14 May 1985) is a Colombian cyclist, who last rode for UCI Continental team Equipo Continental Supergiros.

== Major results ==
2003
National Junior Road Championships

1st Road race
2nd Time trial

2006
1st Stage 1 Vuelta a Guatemala
2007
1st Overall Vuelta a Colombia U23

1st Stages 3 & 4

1st Stage 4 Ronde de l'Isard
2012
1st Overall Vuelta a Costa Rica

1st Points classification
1st Mountains classification
1st Stages 5 & 7

5th Road race, National Road Championships
2013
1st Overall Vuelta a Guatemala

1st Stage 5

1st Stage 6 Vuelta a Colombia
2014
2nd Overall Volta Ciclística Internacional do Rio Grande do Sul

1st Stage 2

2017
10th Overall Tour of Croatia
2018
5th Overall Tour of the Gila

1st Stage 1

2019
1st Mountains classification Tour de Beauce
