= Costa Rican National Time Trial Championships =

National road cycling championship in Costa Rica

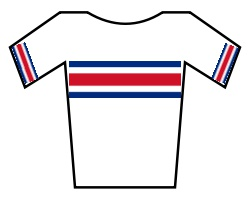
The Champion's Jersey

The Costa Rican National Time Trial Championships are held annually to decide the cycling champions in the time trial, across various categories.

== Men ==
Costa Rican National Time Trial Championships – Men's time trial
Race details
- Date: June
- Discipline: Road
- Type: One-day race

History
- First edition: 2001
- First winner: José Adrián Bonilla
- Most wins: José Adrián Bonilla (5 Wins)
- Most recent: Brian Salas

| Year | Winner | Second | Third |
|---|---|---|---|
| 2001 | José Adrián Bonilla | Federico Ramírez | Ricardo Villalobos |
| 2003 | Nieves Carrasco | Jorge Coto | Juan Pablo Araya |
| 2004 | José Adrián Bonilla | Nieves Carrasco | Federico Ramírez |
| 2005 | Federico Ramírez | Juan Pablo Araya | Nieves Carrasco |
| 2006 | Henry Raabe | Juan Pablo Araya | Nieves Carrasco |
| 2007 | Nieves Carrasco | Juan Pablo Araya | Henry Raabe |
| 2008 | Henry Raabe | José Adrián Bonilla | José Alberto Montero |
| 2009 | José Adrián Bonilla | José Alberto Montero | Nieves Carrasco |
| 2010 | José Adrián Bonilla | Henry Raabe | Juan Pablo Araya |
| 2011 | José Adrián Bonilla | José Vega | Jeison Elías Vega |
| 2012 | Rodolfo Villalobos | José Vega | Nieves Carrasco |
| 2013 | Henry Raabe | Gregory Brenes | José Adrián Bonilla |
| 2014 | Josué González | Brian Salas | César Rojas |
| 2015 | Josué González | Juan Carlos Rojas | Juan Carlos Rojas |
| 2016 | Juan Carlos Rojas | César Rojas | Gregory Brenes |
| 2017 | Brian Salas | Gabriel Marin | Mainor Rojas |
| 2018 | Brian Salas | Román Villalobos | Daniel Jara |
| 2019 | Brian Salas | Daniel Jara | Gabriel Rojas |

== Women ==
Costa Rican National Time Trial Championships – Women's time trial
Race details
- Date: June
- Discipline: Road
- Type: One-day race

History
- First edition: 2001
- First winner: Karen Matamoros
- Most wins: Natalia Navarro (4 Wins)
- Most recent: Maria Jose Vargas

| Year | Winner | Second | Third |
|---|---|---|---|
| 2001 | Karen Matamoros | Jimena Arce | Jazmin Carvajal |
| 2006 | Roxana Alvarado | Adriana Rojas | Alejandra Carvajal |
| 2007 | Alia Cardinale Villalobos | Roxana Alvarado | Jimena Arce |
| 2008 | Roxana Alvarado | Edith Guillén | Rebeca Gonzalez |
| 2009 | Rebeca Gonzalez | Edith Guillén | Marcela Rubiano |
| 2010 | Natalia Navarro | Marcela Rubiano | Cassandra Rodríguez |
| 2011 | Natalia Navarro | Maria Angulo | Edith Guillén |
| 2012 | Natalia Navarro | Edith Guillén | Daniela Martinez |
| 2013 | Natalia Navarro | Katherine Herrera | Edith Guillén |
| 2014 | Edith Guillén | Katherine Herrera | Natalia Navarro |
| 2015 | Katherine Herrera | Milagro Mena | Natalia Navarro |
| 2016 | Milagro Mena | Maria Jose Vargas | Hazel Sancho |
| 2017 | Milagro Mena | Edith Guillén | Maria Jose Vargas |
| 2018 | Maria Jose Vargas | Milagro Mena | Natalia Navarro |
| 2019 | Maria Jose Vargas | Diana Solano | Natalia Navarro |

== See also ==
- Costa Rican National Road Race Championships
