= Rafael Vaca =

Mexican cyclist (born 1934)

Personal information
- Full name: Rafael Vaca Váldez
- Born: 15 January 1934 (age 92)

Cycling career
- Sport: Cycling

Rafael Vaca Váldez (born 15 January 1934) is a Mexican former cyclist. He competed in the individual and team road race events at the 1956 Summer Olympics.
