= Efrén Santos =

Mexican cyclist

Personal information
- Full name: Efrén Santos Moreno
- Born: 9 January 1992 (age 34) San Martín Texmelucan, Mexico

Cycling career
- Sport: Cycling
- Current team: Canel's–Java
- Discipline: Road
- Role: Rider

Amateur teams
- 2013: Arenas–Tlax–Mex
- 2014: Hermanos Correa
- 2015: Dym Jess Tlaxcala
- 2016: Canel's–Specialized

Professional team
- 2017–: Canel's–Specialized

Major wins
- One-day races and Classics National Road Race Championships (2017)

Efrén Santos Moreno (born 9 January 1992) is a Mexican cyclist, who currently rides for UCI Continental team Canel's–Java.

== Major results ==
2014
3rd Time trial, National Under-23 Road Championships
2016
1st Stage 2 Vuelta Ciclista a Costa Rica
2017
1st Road race, National Road Championships
3rd Overall Vuelta Ciclista a Costa Rica

1st Stages 1 & 9

3rd Overall Vuelta Ciclista de Chile
2018
1st Stage 2 Vuelta Ciclista a Costa Rica
10th Gran Premio Comité Olímpico Nacional
2019
1st Stage 1 Grand Prix Cycliste de Saguenay
2nd Overall Vuelta Ciclista a Costa Rica

1st Stage 4

5th Overall Vuelta Ciclista de Chile
7th Road race, Pan American Championships
10th Overall Joe Martin Stage Race
2020
1st Stage 6 Vuelta al Ecuador
