= Henry Raabe =

Costa Rican road cyclist

Personal information
- Full name: Henry Raabe Méndez
- Nickname: El Cañonero del Irazú
- Born: 14 March 1983 (age 43) Cartago, Costa Rica
- Height: 1.77 m (5 ft 9 1/2 in)
- Weight: 71 kg (157 lb)

Cycling career
- Sport: Cycling
- Current team: Ciclo Cafe–Repuestos Mena
- Disciplines: Road; Para-cycling
- Role: Rider

Amateur teams
- 2002–2003: Pizza Hut–Café de Costa Rica
- 2004: Cropusa–Burgos
- 2004: Pizza Hut–Bancredito–Powerade
- 2005–2008: BCR Pizza Hut
- 2009–2011: Citi Economy Blue
- 2012–2019: Coopenae Economy Rent a Car
- 2024–: Ciclo Cafe–Coffee Expert
Medal record
Representing Costa Rica
Central American and Caribbean Games
Bronze medal – third place	2010 Mayagüez	Time trial
Parapan American Games
Silver medal – second place	2019 Lima	Road race C1-3

Henry Raabe Méndez (born March 14, 1983) is a Costa Rican road racing cyclist. He represented Costa Rica at the 2008 Summer Olympics in Beijing, where he competed for the men's road race. Raabe, however, was lapped and disqualified from the run, before reaching the 185.0 km lap of the course.

In August 2020, Raabe was diagnosed with non-Hodgkin lymphoma and began the chemotherapy process.

== Major results ==
2002
Vuelta Ciclista a Costa Rica

1st Stages 8 & 11

2003
Vuelta Ciclista a Costa Rica

1st Stages 3a (TTT) & 9

2004
1st Stage 5 (TTT) Vuelta Ciclista a Costa Rica
2005
National Under-23 Road Championships

1st Road race
1st Time trial

2nd Overall Vuelta Ciclista a Costa Rica

1st Stage 6

2006
National Road Championships

1st Road race
1st Time trial
1st Under-23 time trial

1st Overall Vuelta Ciclista a Costa Rica

1st Prologue, Stages 3 (ITT) & 5

10th Time trial, Pan American Road Championships
2007
1st Overall Vuelta Ciclista a Costa Rica

1st Stages 3 (ITT), 7, 8 & 13

2008
National Road Championships

1st Time trial
2nd Road race

7th Time trial, Pan American Road Championships
9th Overall Vuelta Ciclista a Costa Rica
2009
1st Road race, National Road Championships
2010
National Road Championships

1st Road race
2nd Time trial

2nd Time trial, Central American Games
2nd Overall Vuelta Ciclista a Costa Rica

1st Stage 9

3rd Time trial, Central American and Caribbean Games
8th Time trial, Pan American Road Championships
2011
1st Stage 1 Vuelta Ciclista a Costa Rica
2013
1st Time trial, National Road Championships
2014
3rd Road race, National Road Championships
8th Overall Vuelta Ciclista a Costa Rica

1st Stage 9

2015
3rd Time trial, National Road Championships
