= César Rojas =

Costa Rican cyclist

Personal information
- Full name: César Andrés Rojas Villegas
- Born: 23 March 1988 (age 38)

Cycling career
- Sport: Cycling
- Current team: Suspended
- Discipline: Road
- Role: Rider

Amateur team
- 2013–2017: Frijoles Los Tierniticos

César Andrés Rojas Villegas (born 23 March 1988) is a Costa Rican cyclist, who is currently suspended from the sport following a positive drugs test at the 2017 Vuelta Ciclista a Costa Rica. His brother Juan Carlos Rojas is also a cyclist.

== Major results ==
2008
1st Road race, National Under-23 Road Championships
2010
National Road Championships

1st Time trial
2nd Under-23 road race

2012
Vuelta Ciclista a Costa Rica

1st Stages 4 & 6

2013
10th Overall Vuelta Ciclista a Costa Rica
2014
2nd Overall Vuelta Ciclista a Costa Rica

1st Mountains classification
1st Stage 3

3rd Time trial, National Road Championships
2015
4th Overall Vuelta Ciclista a Costa Rica

1st Mountains classification
1st Stages 9 & 10

2016
1st Overall Vuelta Ciclista a Costa Rica

1st Stage 3

National Road Championships

2nd Time trial
3rd Road race

2017
~~3rd Overall Vuelta Ciclista a Costa Rica~~

~~1st Stage 9~~
