= Pablo Alarcón (cyclist) =

Chilean cyclist (born 1988)

Personal information
- Full name: Pablo Andrés Alarcón Cares
- Born: 15 May 1988 (age 38) Osorno, Chile

Cycling career
- Sport: Cycling
- Current team: Canel's–Java
- Discipline: Road
- Role: Rider

Amateur team
- 2015–2016: Canel's–Specialized

Professional teams
- 2014: PinoRoad
- 2017–: Canel's–Specialized

Pablo Andrés Alarcón Cares (born 15 May 1988) is a Chilean cyclist, who currently rides for UCI Continental team Canel's–Java.

== Major results ==
2012
2nd Road race, National Road Championships
9th Overall Vuelta Ciclista de Chile
2014
2nd Road race, National Road Championships
2016
1st Gran Premio de San José
2018
5th Overall Vuelta a Costa Rica
6th Gran Premio FECOCI
7th Gran Premio Comite Olímpico Nacional
South American Games

8th Road race
10th Time trial

2019
1st Stage 3b Tour de Beauce
2nd Overall Vuelta Ciclista a Chiloé

1st Points classification
1st Stage 3

8th Overall Joe Martin Stage Race
10th Overall Vuelta a Costa Rica

1st Stage 10

2020
3rd Gran Premio de la Patagonia
