= Román Villalobos =

Costa Rican bicycle racer

Personal information
- Full name: Román Villalobos Solís
- Born: 24 June 1990 (age 36) Heredia, Costa Rica

Cycling career
- Sport: Cycling
- Discipline: Road
- Role: Rider

Amateur teams
- 2012: Koplad–Uni2
- 2013: Telco'm–Conor
- 2014: JPS–Giant
- 2015: Nestlé–Giant

Professional teams
- 2016–2017: Canel's–Specialized
- 2017: LA Alumínios / Metalusa Blackjack
- 2018–2019: Canel's–Specialized

Román Villalobos Solís (born 24 June 1990) is a Costa Rican former cyclist.

In 2018 Villalobos was issued with an eight-year ban set to end in 2027 for an anti-doping rule violation after testing positive for metandienone at the 2018 Vuelta Ciclista a Costa Rica. Villalobas had previously served an 18-month ban for testing positive for ostarine in 2013.

== Major results ==
2012
1st Time trial, National Road Championships
2nd Overall Vuelta Ciclista a Costa Rica

1st Young rider classification

3rd Overall Vuelta a Guatemala

1st Young rider classification

2014
4th Overall Vuelta Ciclista a Costa Rica

1st Stage 5

2015
1st Overall Vuelta a Guatemala

1st Stage 3

2nd Overall Vuelta Ciclista a Costa Rica

1st Stage 8

2016
1st Overall Vuelta a Guatemala

1st Stage 5

3rd Overall Vuelta Ciclista a Costa Rica

1st Points classification
1st Mountains classification
1st Stages 5 & 6 (ITT)

3rd Gran Premio de San José
5th Time trial, Pan American Road Championships
9th Overall Tour de San Luis
2017
1st Overall Vuelta Ciclista a Costa Rica

1st Stages 5 (ITT), 7 & 10

3rd Road race, National Road Championships
2018
Vuelta Ciclista a Costa Rica

1st Points classification
1st Mountains classification
1st Stages 6 & 7

1st Stage 2 Tour de San Luis
2nd Time trial, National Road Championships
5th Road race, Central American and Caribbean Games
