= Vuelta Internacional Femenina a Costa Rica =

Costa Rican multi-day road cycling race

Vuelta Femenina a Costa Rica
Race details
- Region: Costa Rica
- English name: Women's Tour of Costa Rica
- Local name: Vuelta a Costa Rica
- Nickname: Giro Tico
- Discipline: Road race
- Competition: UCI Elite Women's Calendar
- Type: Stage race
- Organiser: Federacion Costaricense de Ciclismo
- Web site: fecoci.net/arlenis-sierra-campeona-de-vfcr-banco-popular/

History
- First edition: 1991
- Editions: 19 (as of 2022)
- First winner: Rosaura Méndez (CRC)
- Most wins: Karen Matamoros (CRC) (3 wins)
- Most recent: Carolina Vargas (COL)

The Vuelta Internacional Femenina a Costa Rica is a multi-day bicycle racing stage race held annually in Costa Rica. The race is categorised as 2.2 by the Union Cycliste Internationale (UCI) and has traditionally been run in October, although in 2009 it was held in May. The events are organised by the Federacion Costaricense de Ciclismo.

== Previous winners ==
Year	Country	Rider	Team
1991	Costa Rica	Rosaura Méndez	
1992– 2001	No race		
2002	Costa Rica	Karen Matamoros	Pizza Hut
2003	Costa Rica	Karen Matamoros	Pizza Hut
2004	Colombia	Viviana Maya	Team Matamoros
2005	Costa Rica	Karen Matamoros	Team Matamoros
2006	Costa Rica	Adriana Rojas	Battery
2007	Costa Rica	Adriana Rojas	Battery
2008	Colombia	Gloria Gutiérrez	Futuro Colombia
2009	El Salvador	Evelyn García	Fenixs
2010	El Salvador	Evelyn García	Fenixs
2011	Costa Rica	Edith Guillén	
2012	Costa Rica	Edith Guillén	
2013	Lithuania	Inga Čilvinaitė	Pasta Zara–Cogeas
2014	Russia	Olga Zabelinskaya	RusVelo
2015	Costa Rica	Milagro Mena	
2016	Cuba	Arlenis Sierra	World Cycling Centre
2017	Cuba	Arlenis Sierra	Astana
2018	Colombia	Liliana Moreno	Astana
2019	No race		
2020– 2021	No race due to the COVID-19 pandemic in Costa Rica		
2022	Colombia	Carolina Vargas	Colombia (national team)
