= Vuelta Mexico Telmex =

Mexican multi-day road cycling race

Race details
- Date: Early March
- Region: Mexico, North America
- English name: Tour of Mexico
- Nicknames: "Latin America's Grand Tour"; "Tour of the Americas"
- Discipline: Road cycling
- Competition: UCI America Tour
- Type: Stage race
- Organiser: Telmex, CONADE

History
- First edition: 1948
- Editions: 28
- Final edition: 2015
- First winner: Eduardo Aguilar (MEX)
- Most wins: Ángel Romero (MEX); Rafael Vaca (MEX); Raúl Alcalá (MEX); (3 wins)
- Final winner: Francisco Colorado (COL)

Vuelta Ciclista Mexico Telmex was an annual road cycling race in Mexico that took place over the course of eight days, involving eight stages. The Mexico national tour had a rich history dating back to the 1940s, and the latest incarnation was revived in late 2008 and early 2009 as the condensed evolution of the Vueltas de las Americas, a 21-day stage race, defunct from 2003. This national tour was ranked 2.2, according to UCI race classifications, and was a part of the UCI America Tour. Title sponsorship was provided via CONADE (Comisión Nacional de Cultura Física y Deporte), as well as the Telmex Foundation, a philanthropic entity created by Telmex C.E.O., Carlos Slim. Additional sponsorship was provided previously by BMW, Mercury, Coca-Cola, NovoSportware, and Metalurgica Creativa.

== History ==
=== 2008 Vuelta a Mexico ===

With prizes of 2,000,000 Peso, worth roughly 188,000 (USD), the 2008 Vuelta a Mexico was held between September 13–20, and was centered primarily in the region north of Mexico City, commencing in Aguascalientes and concluded in the outskirts of Distrito Federal. Stage four was neutralized due to bad weather reducing the length of the Vuelta to 1,059 kilometers down from the scheduled 1,139. The final General Classification was won by New Zealand racer, Glen Chadwick riding for team sponsor Team Type 1, which supports persons inflicted with Type 1 diabetes. Chadwick would return in 2009 to defend his title, albeit with rival sponsor Rock Racing.

=== 2009 Vuelta a Mexico ===

In what was for all intents and purposes the "de facto" inaugural event, the revamped 2009 Vuelta Mexico Telmex was given a new date on the UCI America Tour calendar. This made it possible for American teams to join the race; the race was scheduled one week after the conclusion of February's Tour of California, and ended well before March's Redlands Bicycle Classic and April's Tour de Georgia. The Vuelta Mexico Telmex aimed to become the most significant stage race in Latin America, as a standard for Latin American teams, North American teams, and UCI Pro Continental teams seeking results and Grand Tour invite.

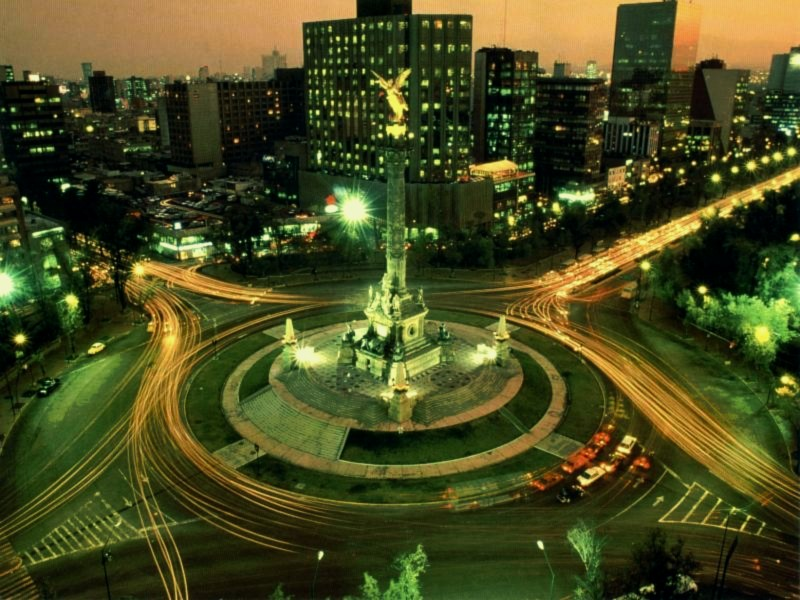
Angel de la Independencia, Paseo de la Reforma, Mexico City

The 2009 Vuelta saw diverse North American presence, with first time participants including Rudy Pevenage directed, Rock Racing; Steve Bauer directed, Planet Energy; U.S. based OUCH–Maxxis featuring Floyd Landis, all alongside the 2008 winning team Team Type 1. In addition, Trek–Livestrong U-23 Developmental Team, featuring Taylor Phinney started the race. The team was directed by Axel Merckx and partially owned by Lance Armstrong, who was on hand to fire the start signal for the 2009 race. During his trip to Vuelta Mexico, Armstrong stated that "a country the size of Mexico, with such diverse landscape needs to have a tour." With the primary devotion of fighting childhood cancer on behalf of his Lance Armstrong Foundation, Armstrong participated in various events with sponsors and the public, including a health care forum with Mexican President Felipe Calderon.

With prizes of 2.5 million Peso, worth roughly 163,000 (USD), the 2009 edition was held March 1–8, and was centered primarily among regional states located in the south-central part of Mexico. The race began in Oaxaca and passed through Puebla, Tlaxcala, Morelos, Edomex, Guanajuato, and Hildago before culminating in the center of Mexico City. The final stage, won by Canada's Andrew Pinfold, ended with a finish similar to that of the Tour de France as the 100+ kilometer circuit race completed twelve laps of the Angel of Independence along a large portion of the 12-kilometre (7.5-mile) Paseo de la Reforma (Reform Promenade). The extra wide boulevard, with its historically elegant design, sharply resembled Paris' Champs-Élysées. It stretched from Chapultepec Park, passing alongside Latin America's tallest building, the Torre Mayor, continuing through the Zona Rosa and then on to the Zócalo (Plaza de la Constitución). Among the largest central squares in the world, El Zócalo is bordered by the Mexico City Metropolitan Cathedral, National Palace, and is adjacent to the ancient Templo Mayor site. Ironically, Paseo de la Reforma, was modeled during the French occupation of the 1860s upon orders from Maximilian I with the dual purpose of linking Chapultepec Castle to the National Palace, while also creating a French legacy in the city centre.

Despite the presence of pre-race favorites Gilberto Simoni, Floyd Landis, Tyler Hamilton, Glen Chadwick, and Arquimedes Lam, the Final Overall General Classification was won by Venezuelan racer Jackson Rodríguez, of Venezuelan team sponsor Diquigiovanni–Androni. The Best Young Rider Classification, awarded to the highest place rider under the age of 23, was won by American Peter Stetina of the U.S. National Team. The combativity classification went to Karl Menzies (OUCH–Maxxis), David Vitoria (Rock Racing) won the mountains classification, and Carlos López (Canels Turbo) won the Mexican rider classification.

=== 2010 Vuelta a Mexico ===

The 2010 Vuelta Mexico Telmex was won by Óscar Sevilla, riding for the Rock Racing–Murcia team.

== Jerseys ==
- Yellow = Overall Leader
- White = Best Mexican
- Red = Mountain Leader
- Green = Combativity Leader
- Blue = u23 Leader

== Winners ==
=== Vuelta Mexico ===
Year	Country	Rider	Team
1948	Mexico	Eduardo Aguilar	
1949	France	Blaise Quaglieri	
1950	Mexico	Ricardo García	
1951	Mexico	Ángel Romero	
1952	Mexico	Ángel Romero	
1953	Mexico	Ángel Romero	
1954	Mexico	Rafael Vaca	
1955	No race		
1956	Mexico	Rafael Vaca	
1957	Mexico	Rafael Vaca	
1958– 1959	No race		
1960	Mexico	Porfirio Remigio	
1961	Mexico	Jacinto Brito	
1962– 1967	No race		
1968	Soviet Union	Vladimir Sokolov	

=== Ruta Mexico ===
Year	Country	Rider	Team
1989	Mexico	Raúl Alcalá	
1990	Mexico	Raúl Alcalá	
1991	Colombia	Julio César Ortegon	Postobón–Manzana–Ryalcao
1992	No race		
1993	France	Laurent Fignon	Gatorade–Mega Drive–Kenwood
1994	Mexico	Raúl Alcalá	Motorola
1995	Colombia	Luis Espinosa	Postobón–Manzana
1996	No race		
1997	Colombia	José Luis Vanegas	Caprecom
1998	Mexico	Miguel Arroyo	Canel's Turbo
1999	Colombia	José Luis Vanegas	Aguardiente Néctar-Selle Italia

=== Vuelta Mexico Telmex ===
Year	Country	Rider	Team
2008	New Zealand	Glen Chadwick	Team Type 1
2009	Venezuela	Jackson Rodríguez	Diquigiovanni–Androni
2010	Spain	Óscar Sevilla	Rock Racing–Murcia
2011	No race		
2012	Colombia	Julián Rodas	Gobernación de Antioquia–Indeportes Antioquia
2013	No race		
2014	Colombia	Juan Pablo Villegas	4-72 Colombia
2015	Colombia	Francisco Colorado	Canel's–Specialized
