= Costa Rican National Road Race Championships =

National road cycling championship in Costa Rica

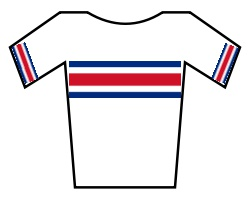
The Champion's Jersey

The Costa Rican National Road Race Championships are held annually to decide the cycling champions in the road race, across various categories.

== Men ==
Costa Rican National Road Race Championships – Men's elite race
Race details
- Date: June
- Discipline: Road
- Type: One-day race

History
- First edition: 2001
- First winner: Luis Roberto Morera
- Most wins: Henry Raabe (3 wins)
- Most recent: Jason Huertas

Year	Winner	Second	Third
2001	Luis Roberto Morera	Danny Villalobos	Marcos Rodriguez Araya
2002	Not held
2003	Marconi Duran	Nieves Carrasco	Estéban Castro
2004	Carlos Salazar	Juan Pablo Araya	Federico Ramírez
2005	Paulo Vargas	Ernesto Hernandez	Deiber Esquivel
2006	Henry Raabe	Juan Carlos Rojas	Estéban Castro
2007	Luis Alexander Garcia (Note: Juan Carlos Rojas initially won the race, but tested positive for the use of Phentermine after the Vuelta a El Salvador. Subsequently he was disqualified from the 2007 national road race and was ruled ineligible for two years.)	Juan Pablo Araya	Marconi Duran
2008	Alexander Sánchez	Henry Raabe	Marconi Duran
2009	Henry Raabe	Marco Vinicio Salas	Luis Alonso Rojas
2010	Henry Raabe	Allan Morales	Juan Carlos Rojas
2011	Juan Mata	Mainer Vargas	Jonathan Segura
2012	Pablo Mudarra	Jeison Elías Vega	Jonathan Carballo
2013	Paul Betancourt	Nieves Carrasco	Alexander Sánchez
2014	Juan Carlos Rojas	Joseph Chavarría	Henry Raabe
2015	Bryan Villalobos	Rodolfo Villalobos	Pablo Mudarra
2016	Joseph Chavarría	Juan Carlos Rojas	César Rojas
2017	Gabriel Marin	Carlos Andres Brenes	Román Villalobos
2018	Joseph Chavarría	Rolando González	Daniel Jara
2019	Felipe Nystrom	Daniel Jara	Mainor Rojas
2020	Not held due to the COVID-19 pandemic in Costa Rica
2021	Jason Huertas	Gabriel Marin	Pablo Mudarra
2022	Jason Huertas	Pablo Mudarra	Joseph Chavarría

== Women ==
Costa Rican National Road Race Championships – Women's elite race
Race details
- Date: June
- Discipline: Road
- Type: One-day race

History
- First edition: 2001
- First winner: Karen Matamoros
- Most wins: Marcela Rubiano (4 wins)
- Most recent: Krissia Araya

Year	Winner	Second	Third
2001	Karen Matamoros	Mayra Quinchilla	Ana Soto
2006	Alejandra Carvajal	Roxana Alvarado	Yoilin Moreira
2007	Marcela Rubiano	Alejandra Carvajal	Daniela Martinez
2008	Marcela Castillo	Alejandra Carvajal	Rebeca Gonzalez
2009	Maira Chinchilla	Edith Guillén	Adriana Rojas
2010	Yessenia Villalta	Cassandra Rodríguez	Daniela Martinez
2011	Adriana Rojas	Edith Guillén	Marcela Rubiano
2012	Marcela Rubiano	Edith Guillén	Natalia Navarro
2013	Edith Guillén	Marcela Rubiano	Daniela Martinez
2014	Paula Herrera	Ingrid Ramirez	Susan Camacho
2015	Marcela Rubiano	Edith Guillén	Milagro Mena
2016	Marcela Rubiano	Milagro Mena	María José Vargas
2017	Natalia Navarro	María José Vargas	Fiorella Boniche
2018	María José Vargas	Milagro Mena	Edith Guillén
2019	Milagro Mena	María José Vargas	Marcela Rubiano
2020	Not held due to the COVID-19 pandemic in Costa Rica
2021	Cristel Espinoza	Estefanie Álvarez	María José Vargas
2022	Krissia Araya	Estefanie Álvarez	Angie Bogantes

== See also ==
- Costa Rican National Time Trial Championships
