= Juan Carlos Rojas (cyclist) =

Costa Rican cyclist

Personal information
- Full name: Juan Carlos Rojas Villegas
- Born: 22 December 1981 (age 44)
- Height: 1.66 m (5 ft 5 1/2 in)
- Weight: 58 kg (128 lb)

Cycling career
- Sport: Cycling
- Current team: Suspended
- Discipline: Road
- Role: Rider

Amateur teams
- 2005–2006: Pasoca–Dos Pinos
- 2009: Lycem–JPS–Orbea
- 2010: Junta de Protección Social–Giant
- 2014–2017: Frijoles Los Tierniticos

Juan Carlos Rojas Villegas (born 22 December 1981) is a Costa Rican cyclist, who is currently suspended from the sport following a positive drugs test at the 2017 Vuelta Ciclista a Costa Rica. He won the 2013–14 UCI America Tour.

== Major results ==
2004
10th Overall Vuelta Ciclista a Costa Rica

1st Stage 7

2005
1st Overall Vuelta Ciclista a Costa Rica

1st Prologue, Stages 4, 5 (ITT) & 13

2006
1st Overall Vuelta a Guatemala

1st Stages 8 & 9

2nd Road race, National Road Championships
3rd Overall Vuelta Ciclista a Costa Rica
2007
1st Road race, National Road Championships
1st Stage 2 (TTT) Tour of Nicaragua
2009
1st Overall Vuelta a Guatemala

1st Stages 3 & 6 (ITT)

4th Overall Vuelta Ciclista a Costa Rica

1st Stage 12

5th Overall Vuelta al Ecuador
2010
1st Overall Vuelta Ciclista a Costa Rica

1st Stages 3, 6, 7 (ITT), 11 (ITT) & 12

3rd Road race, National Road Championships
2011
3rd Overall Vuelta Ciclista a Costa Rica
2013
1st Overall Vuelta Ciclista a Costa Rica

1st Points classification
1st Mountains classification
1st Stages 3, 7 (ITT), 10, 11 (ITT) & 12

2014
1st 2013–14 UCI America Tour
1st Road race, National Road Championships
1st Overall Vuelta Ciclista a Costa Rica

1st Points classification
1st Stages 8 & 10

2015
1st Overall Vuelta Ciclista a Costa Rica
2nd Time trial, National Road Championships
9th Overall Tour do Rio
2016
National Road Championships

1st Time trial
2nd Road race

2nd Overall Vuelta a Costa Rica

1st Stages 7 & 11

2017
~~1st Overall Vuelta Ciclista a Costa Rica~~

~~1st Stages 4, 5 (ITT) & 10~~
