= Coopenae–Extralum =

Costa Rican road cycling team

Team information
- UCI code: CEE
- Registered: Costa Rica
- Founded: 2015
- Discipline: Road
- Status: National (2015); UCI Continental (2016– )

Coopenae–Extralum (UCI team code: CEE) is a Costa Rican road cycling team, founded in 2015 at domestic level. In 2016 the team acquired a UCI Continental licence.
