= Gran Premio de San José =

Race details
- Date: December
- Region: Costa Rica
- Discipline: Road
- Competition: UCI America Tour
- Type: One-day race
- Web site: www.fecoci.net

History
- First edition: 2016
- Editions: 1
- Final edition: 2016
- First winner: Pablo Alarcón (CHI)
- Most wins: No repeat winners
- Final winner: Pablo Alarcón (CHI)

Gran Premio de San José was a one-day road cycling race held only in 2016. It was rated a category 1.2 on the UCI America Tour.

== Winners ==
| Year | Country | Rider | Team |
|---|---|---|---|
| 2016 | Chile | Pablo Alarcón | |
