= Karen Matamoros =

Costa Rican cyclist

Personal information
- Born: 11 September 1982 (age 44) Costa Rica

Cycling career
- Sport: Cycling

Karen Matamoros (born 11 September 1982) is a Costa Rican cyclist. She is known for competing in the women's cross-country mountain biking event at the 2004 Summer Olympics.
