= Vuelta a Guatemala =

Guatemalan multi-day road cycling race

Race details
- Date: October–November
- Region: Guatemala
- English name: Tour of Guatemala
- Discipline: Road race
- Competition: UCI America Tour
- Type: Stage race
- Organiser: Fed. Nacional de Ciclismo de Guatemala

History
- First edition: 1957
- Editions: 64 (as of 2025)
- Final edition: (Colombia) Santiago Garzón
- First winner: (Guatemala) Jorge Surqué
- Most wins: 2 times: (Guatemala) Aureliano Cuque López (Colombia) José Patrocinio Jiménez (Guatemala) Edin Roberto Nova (Guatemala) Manuel Rodas (Costa Rica) Juan Carlos Rojas (Costa Rica) Román Villalobos
- Final winner: Robinson López (COL)

The Vuelta a Guatemala (Spanish for Tour of Guatemala) is a multi-day road bicycle racing stage race held annually and typically during late October and early November in several locations in Guatemala. The competition carries a UCI rating of 2.2 (having also been rated 2.5 from 2002 to 2004) and is part of the UCI America Tour, which is one of six UCI Continental Circuits sponsored by the Union Cycliste Internationale, the sport's international governing body. The race is organized by the Federacion Nacional de Ciclismo de Guatemala.

== History ==
The Vuelta a Guatemala, which has become the largest sporting event in the country in terms of spectator affluence, was first held in 1957. The winner of the first edition was local racer Jorge Surqué, and during the first four years, the competition was dominated by Guatemalan and Colombian participants. As of 2007, Colombia is the nation with the most wins all-time, with 21 general classification individual wins.

From 1992 to 1996, five different Colombian participants took five consecutive titles, before local racer Luis Rodolfo Muj won in 1997, becoming the first Guatemalan to finish first since Edin Roberto Nova had won his second tour in 1988, and ending the longest drought of titles for his country.

The winner of the 2004 edition of the race, Lizandro Ajcú, was disqualified afterwards for doping in what was the biggest doping case of the race's history – nine riders including the first four on the General classification returned positive A samples.

In 2005, the tour was cancelled after Tropical Storm Stan's heavy rainfalls caused floods and mudslides which damaged infrastructure and caused 1500 deaths weeks before the race was due to begin.

The LII edition of the race in 2011 was cancelled by the organizers shortly before the start of the race. Heavy rains during September and October damaged roads and paths, and the Guatemala Government, having concerns for life safety, decreed the cancellation as the infrastructure could not be restored in such a short period and rescheduling of the event was not feasible due to the busy schedules of different participants. The event was then scheduled for May 13–20, 2012.

== Past winners ==
Year	Country	Rider	Team
1957	Guatemala	Jorge Surqué	
1958	Colombia	Hernán Medina	
1959	Guatemala	Aureliano Cuque	
1960	Colombia	Jorge Luque	
1961	Guatemala	Aureliano Cuque	
1962	Spain	Esteban Martín	
1963	Guatemala	Juan José Pontaza	
1964	Colombia	Rubén Darío Gómez	
1965	Spain	José Segu	
1966	Guatemala	Saturnino Rustrián	
1967	Guatemala	Benigno Rustrián	
1968	Spain	Manuel Galera	
1969	Spain	Fulgencio Sánchez	
1970	Spain	José Abelda	
1971	Guatemala	Mario Nufio	
1972	Guatemala	Samuel Herrera	
1973	Colombia	Luis Leonardo Tobar	
1974	No race		
1975	Mexico	Manuel Ceja	
1976	Colombia	José Patrocinio Jiménez	
1977	Colombia	José Patrocinio Jiménez	
1978	No race		
1979	Mexico	Bernardo Cólex	
1980	Colombia	Samuel Cabrera	
1981	Guatemala	Héctor Dubón	
1982	Colombia	Rafael Tolosa	
1983	Guatemala	Victor Castañeda	
1984	Guatemala	Edin Nova	
1985	Colombia	Héctor Patarroyo	
1986	Colombia	Josué López	
1987	Colombia	Orlando Castillo	
1988	Guatemala	Edin Nova	
1989	Chile	Daniel Vargas	
1990	Colombia	Adolfo Rico	
1991	Costa Rica	Andrés Brenes	
1992	Colombia	José Castelblanco	
1993	Colombia	José Robles	
1994	Cuba	Eliecer Valdés	
1995	Colombia	Jairo Hernández	
1996	Colombia	Graciano Fonseca	
1997	Guatemala	Luis Rodolfo Muj	Windsor-Guatemala
1998	Colombia	Ismael Sarmiento	Colombia (national team)
1999	Guatemala	Fernando Escobar	Bancomet
2000	Guatemala	Fermín Méndez	Bancomet
2001	Colombia	Gregorio Ladino	Canel's Turbo-México
2002	Colombia	Víctor Hugo González	Hino-Radio Punto-E.U.A.
2003	Colombia	César Salazar	Lotería del Táchira
2004	Costa Rica	Paulo Vargas	Pizza Hut-Costa Rica
2005	No race		
2006	Costa Rica	Juan Carlos Rojas	Dos Pinos Costa Rica
2007	Mexico	Carlos López Gonzalez	Canel's Turbo-Mayordomo
2008	Venezuela	Manuel Medina	Café Quetzal
2009	Costa Rica	Juan Carlos Rojas	Café Quetzal
2010	Colombia	Giovanny Báez	EPM–UNE
2011	No race		
2012	Colombia	Ramiro Rincón	EPM–UNE
2013	Colombia	Óscar Sánchez	GW–Shimano
2014	Colombia	Alex Cano	Orgullo Antioqueño
2015	Costa Rica	Román Villalobos	Nestlé–Giant
2016	Costa Rica	Román Villalobos	Canel's–Specialized
2017	Guatemala	Manuel Rodas	Decorabaños
2018	Guatemala	Alfredo Ajpacajá	Decorabaños
2019	Guatemala	Manuel Rodas	Decorabaños
2020	Guatemala	Mardoqueo Vásquez	Hino-One-La Red-Tigo-Eurobikes
2021	No race		
2022	Guatemala	Mardoqueo Vásquez	Hino-One-La Red
2023	Guatemala	Gerson Toc	Decoba–ASO Quetzaltenango
2024	Colombia	Robinson López	GW–Shimano
2025	Colombia	Santiago Garzón	GW–Shimano
