= Canel's–Java =

Mexican cycling team

Canel's–Zerouno
Team information
- UCI code: CAZ
- Registered: Mexico
- Founded: 2012
- Discipline: Road
- Status: UCI Continental

Key personnel
- General manager: Juan José Monsivais Garcia
- Team manager: Juan José Monsivais Almendarez

Team name history
- 2012–2014 2015–2019 2020 2021–2022 2023 2024–: Canel's Turbo; Canel's–Specialized; Canel's Pro Cycling; Canel's–Zerouno; Canel's Pro Cycling; Canel's–Java

Canel's–Java is a professional men's cycling team based in Mexico and founded in 2012, which competes in elite road bicycle racing events under UCI Continental rules. The team takes its name from its main sponsors – Mexican confectionery company Canel's and Italian bicycle manufacturer Zerouno.

== Team roster ==
As of 6 February 2024.

Rider	Date of birth
Luis Aguilar (CRC)	15 April 2003 (age 23)
Pablo Alarcón (CHI)	15 May 1988 (age 38)
Emiliano Castro (MEX)	4 January 2005 (age 21)
Eduardo Corte (MEX)	24 November 1992 (age 33)
Kevin Jimenez (MEX)	29 March 2000 (age 26)
Cormac McGeough (IRL)	11 August 1996 (age 30)

Rider	Date of birth
Armando Miralrio (MEX)	24 March 2002 (age 24)
Eduardo Miralrio (MEX)	24 March 2002 (age 24)
Heiner Parra (COL)	9 October 1991 (age 34)
Ignacio Prado (MEX)	21 September 1993 (age 32)
Juan Pablo Rivas (MEX)	31 March 2000 (age 26)
Efrén Santos (MEX)	9 January 1992 (age 34)

== Major results ==
2014
Stage 6 Vuelta a Guatemala, Francisco Colorado
2015
Overall Vuelta Mexico Telmex, Francisco Colorado
2016
Stage 5 Vuelta a Guatemala, Román Villalobos
Stages 5 & 6 (ITT) Vuelta Popular a Costa Rica, Román Villalobos
2017
Mexican National Road Race Championships, Efrén Santos
Stage 1 Vuelta Ciclista Internacional a Costa Rica, Efrén Santos
Stage 8 Vuelta Ciclista Internacional a Costa Rica, Eduardo Corte
2018
Stage 2 Vuelta a San Juan, Román Villalobos
Stage 1 Tour of the Gila, Óscar Eduardo Sánchez
Stage 1 Vuelta Internacional Ciclista Michoacan, Román Villalobos
Stage 5 Vuelta Internacional Ciclista Michoacan, Óscar Eduardo Sánchez
Stage 6 Vuelta Internacional Ciclista Michoacan, Ignacio Prado
2019
Stage 3 Vuelta Ciclista de Chile, Pablo Alarcón
Stage 1 Grand Prix Cycliste de Saguenay, Efrén Santos
Stage 3b Tour de Beauce, Pablo Alarcón
2020
Mexican National Time Trial Championships, Ignacio Prado
2021
Mexican National Time Trial Championships, Ignacio Prado
