= Vuelta Ciclista a Costa Rica =

Bicycle racing stage race

Race details
- Date: December
- Region: Costa Rica
- English name: Tour of Costa Rica
- Local name: Vuelta a Costa Rica
- Nickname: Giro Tico
- Discipline: Road race
- Competition: UCI America Tour
- Type: Stage race
- Organiser: Federacion Costarricense de Ciclismo

History
- First edition: 1965
- Editions: 59 (as of 2025)
- First winner: José Luis Sánchez (CRC)
- Most wins: Juan Carlos Rojas (CRC) (6 wins)
- Most recent: Luis Daniel Oses (CRC)

The Vuelta Ciclista a Costa Rica (English: Tour of Costa Rica) is a bicycle racing stage race held annually, since 1965, in Costa Rica. The men's Vuelta carries a UCI rating of 2.2 and is part of the UCI America Tour, which is one of six UCI Continental Circuits sponsored by the Union Cycliste Internationale, the sport's international governing body. For the women's race see; Vuelta Internacional Femenina a Costa Rica.

== Doping ==
On 31 January 2018 the UCI announced that they had suspended a number of riders who competed in the 2017 edition of the race, after they tested positive for the third generation blood booster – EPO-CERA. Overall winner Juan Carlos Rojas (Frijoles Los Tierniticos), third place César Rojas Villegas, Leandro Varela, Vladimir Fernandez who won stage 4 of the race, Jose Villalobos, Jason Huertas, Jose Irias, Gabriel Marin, Melvin Mora, Kevin Murillo Solano and Jordy Sandoval.

== Past winners ==
Year	Country	Rider	Team
1965	Costa Rica	José Luis Sánchez	Sanyo-Costa Rica
1966	Guatemala	Saturnino Rustrián	Guatemala national team
1967	Costa Rica	José Manuel Soto	Costa Rica national team
1968	Guatemala	Saturnino Rustrián	Guatemala national team
1969	Colombia	Evaristo Fino	Colombia national team
1970	Mexico	Arturo García	Cuarteta Windsor
1971	Costa Rica	José Manuel Soto	Jabón Spreed
1972	Guatemala	Samuel Herrera	Guatemala national team
1973	Colombia	Wilfredo Insuasti	Colombia national team
1974	Mexico	Rodolfo Vitela	Mexico national team
1975	Colombia	Efrain Pulido	Colombia national team
1976	Colombia	Norberto Cáceres	Colombia national team
1977	Costa Rica	Carlos Alvarado	Banco de Costa Rica
1978	Venezuela	Fernando Fontes	Martell
1979	Colombia	Herman Loaiza	MetalCo
1980	United States	Dale Stetina	United States national team
1981	Costa Rica	Alexis Villalobos	MetalCo
1982	Colombia	Samuel Cabrera	Colombia national team
1983	Colombia	José Antonio Agudelo Gómez	Colombia national team
1984	Colombia	Oliviero Cárdenas	Casa Víctor
1985	Colombia	Néstor Barrera	Colombia national team
1986	Costa Rica	Juan de Dios Castillo	Bicicletas Alvarado
1987	Costa Rica	Carlos Bermúdez	Alvarado Ases
1988	Colombia	Efraím Rico	Colombia national team
1989	Costa Rica	Raúl Montero	Electrónica Hidalgo
1990	Costa Rica	Alfredo Zamora	RCA–Electrodomésticos
1991	Colombia	Edgar Sánchez	Pizza Hut
1992	Colombia	Luis Espinosa	Manzana–Postobón
1993	Costa Rica	Adrián Víquez	Jaisa–Philips–El Globo
1994	Costa Rica	José Andrés Brenes	Pizza Hut–Squirt
1995	Colombia	Raúl Gómez	Colombia national team
1996	Costa Rica	Luis Morera	Pizza Hut
1997	Colombia	Gregorio Ladino	El Verdugo–Jaisa–Globo
1998	Colombia	Hernán Darío Muñoz	Globo Casa Víctor
1999	Mexico	Miguel Arroyo	Canel's Turbo
2000	Costa Rica	Federico Ramírez	Café de Costa Rica–Pizza Hut
2001	Colombia	Gregorio Ladino	Café de Costa Rica
2002	Colombia	Julio César Rangel	2x1 Pizza-Tienda el Globo–Jaisa
2003	Costa Rica	José Adrián Bonilla	Pizza Hut–Bancrédito
2004	Colombia	Israel Ochoa	Ferretería el Mar–Video Visión
2005	Costa Rica	Juan Carlos Rojas	Pasoca–Dos Pinos
2006	Costa Rica	Henry Raabe	BCR–Pizza Hut
2007	Costa Rica	Henry Raabe	BCR–Pizza Hut
2008	Costa Rica	Gregory Brenes	BCR–Pizza Hut
2009	Colombia	Janier Acevedo	GreatWall–Indeportes
2010	Costa Rica	Juan Carlos Rojas	JPS–Giant
2011	Costa Rica	José Adrián Bonilla	Citi Economy Blue
2012	Colombia	Óscar Sánchez	GW–Shimano
2013	Costa Rica	Juan Carlos Rojas	JPS–Giant
2014	Costa Rica	Juan Carlos Rojas	Tierniticos–Halcón
2015	Costa Rica	Juan Carlos Rojas	Frijoles Los Tierniticos
2016	Costa Rica	César Rojas	Frijoles Los Tierniticos
2017	Costa Rica	Juan Carlos Rojas	Frijoles Los Tierniticos
2018	Costa Rica	Bryan Salas Sánchez	Nestlé 7C CBZ Giant
2019	Costa Rica	Daniel Bonilla	Scotiabank–Nestlé–Métrica–Giant
2020–21	No race		
2022	Colombia	Marco Tulio Suesca	Movistar–Best PC
2023	Colombia	Juan Diego Alba	Movistar–Best PC
2024	Costa Rica	Luis Daniel Oses	7C Economy Lacoinex
2025	Costa Rica	Luis Daniel Oses	7C Economy Lacoinex

== Trophy ==
In 2023, the Vuelta a Costa Rica introduced an official championship trophy for the first time in its history, after more than five decades of competition.

The trophy was designed by Costa Rican designer Jorge Vargas, winner of a national competition organized by the Costa Rican Cycling Federation (FECOCI).

The design incorporates symbolic elements representing the nature of the race and national identity, including a wooden base, a mountain-shaped structure symbolizing climbing stages, and metallic elements in gold and silver representing victory, effort, and perseverance.
